= List of Magpakailanman episodes (2012–2019) =

Magpakailanman ('Forevermore') is a weekly drama anthology broadcast by GMA Network in the Republic of the Philippines. The show is hosted by 24 Oras anchor and GMA Kapuso Foundation founder Mel Tiangco and features inspiring stories and life experiences from both famous and ordinary people. It airs every Saturday on the network's primetime block.

The following are the lists of Magpakailanman episodes in the 2010s, listed by the year they were aired.

== Series overview ==
- List of Magpakailanman episodes (2002–2007)#Episodes
- List of Magpakailanman episodes (2012–2019)#Episodes
- List of Magpakailanman episodes (2020–present)#Episodes

== Episodes ==
=== 2012 ===
No. in season	Title	Cast	Directed by	Written by	Original release date
1	"The Zendee Rose Tenerefe Story"	Louise delos Reyes	Jun Lana	Michiko Yamamoto	November 17, 2012
Supporting Cast: Rio Locsin, Rita Iringan, Chinggay Riego, Glenda Garcia, Emilio Garcia
2	"Chef with No Hands" (The Maricel Apatan Story)	Maxene Magalona, Barbie Forteza	Dominic Zapata	Senedy Que	November 24, 2012
Supporting Cast: Rita Avila, Gardo Versoza, Mike Tan, Rez Cortez, Antonio Aquitania, Lollie Mara, Byron Ortile
3	"The Power of Love" (The Nathaniel "Mang Tani" Cruz Story)	Ricky Davao	Dominic Zapata	Denoy Punio	December 1, 2012
Before becoming GMA Resident Meteorologist, Nathaniel "Mang Tani" Cruz (Ricky Davao/Mark Herras) worked at PAGASA along with his wife Gloria (Glydel Mercado/Kris Bernal). When Tani migrated to Australia, Gloria followed, but suffered a stroke and was declared brain-dead. However, Gloria regained consciousness because of Tani's unconditional love. Supporting Cast: Glydel Mercado, Mark Herras, Kris Bernal, Ryza Cenon, Kevin Santos, Vaness del Moral, Rox Montealegre, Vivo Ouano, Dexter Doria
4	"The Ryzza Mae Dizon Story"	Ryzza Mae Dizon	Ricky Davao	Senedy Que	December 8, 2012
As a seven-year-old simple kid, Ryzza becomes witness to her family's humble beginnings. When her neighbor invited her to join "Eat Bulaga"'s kiddie pageant "Little Miss Philippines", her fortunes slowly changed the moment she won the contest. Supporting Cast: Manilyn Reynes, Yul Servo, Pen Medina, Nova Villa, Diego Llorico
5	"The Nanay Silveria Story"	Jean Garcia	Gina Alajar	Des Garbes-Severino	December 15, 2012
Supporting Cast: Gary Estrada, Kristofer Martin, Julian Trono, Mymy Davao, Chynna Ortaleza, Daria Ramirez, Denzel Santiago, Justin de Leon
6	"Sa Likod ng Mga Ngiti" (The John Edric Ulang & Jaylord Casino Story)	Jake Vargas, Derrick Monasterio	Ricky Davao	Des Garbes-Severino	December 22, 2012
An episode with two stories, it showed the contrasting relationship of the two popular "Mr. Pogi 2012" winners with their respective families. "Mr. Pogi" grand winner John Edric Ulang's (Jake Vargas) father had dreams of joining show business but put them on hold because he married early. Thus he advised his son to take it slow when it comes to relationships. As fate would have it, John Edric also impregnated his girlfriend but that did not stop him from winning the contest. On the other hand, runner-up Jaylord Casino (Derrick Monasterio) had a father who was very cold to him which explains his extreme closeness to his mother. But the moment he qualified for Mr. Pogi, the whole family (including his father) threw their support to him. Supporting Cast: Bobby Andrews, Andrea del Rosario, Neil Ryan Sese, Sherilyn Reyes, Ynna Asistio, Migui Moreno, Nicole Dulalia, JM Reyes, Jerould Aceron
7	"The Miriam Castillo Story"	Gina Alajar	Ricky Davao	Des Garbes-Severino	December 29, 2012
Supporting Cast: Dante Rivero, Miguel Jimenez, Bodie Cruz, Patricia Ysmael, Miggs Cuaderno, Nicky Castro, Marco Alcaraz

=== 2013 ===
No. in season	Title	Cast	Directed by	Written by	Original release date
1	"Pusong Bato" (The Renee dela Rosa Story)	Michael de Mesa, Ryan Eigenmann	Ricky Davao	Senedy Que	January 5, 2013
When "Pusong Bato" became OPM's biggest hit for 2012, many people wondered who was the songwriter behind the heart-wrenching lyrics of the song. This is the story of Renee, a Nazarene devotee who strives hard to be recognized as a singer-songwriter. When he married his wife Alona, he worked even harder to provide a better life for his family. But Alona was not happy because she felt she was not part of his priority. Enter Boy, Renee's bandmate who provided love and care for Alona at times when his friend could not. And it was too late for Renee to realize what his wife had done until she eventually leaves him. Supporting Cast: Angelika dela Cruz, Gian Magdangal, Michelle Madrigal, Leo Martinez, Anna Marin, Pekto, Alicia Alonzo
2	"The Lucy Aroma Story"	Sunshine Dizon	Andoy Ranay	Senedy Que	January 12, 2013
Lucy was a religious, hard-working, obedient, smart, responsible, and grew up in a conservative family. She was the eldest among her siblings. Lucy's family lives in a simple life. Ever since she and her siblings were kids, Lucy was the one who took care of them because their parents were always out working. Even though they were struggling financially, Lucy managed to finish high school. Lucy sacrificed her dream of becoming a lawyer so she can help her parents and bring her younger siblings to school, but her parents discouraged her to continue college, because they couldn't afford it. She obeyed her parents' wish and found work to financially support the whole Aroma family. Years later, all things changed, including her behavior and outlook in life. Problems and obstacles arose that triggered the change in Lucy's actions and behavior. Gina Aroma and her siblings tried and did everything to help take care of Lucy until one day, they found out in the news and on TV that their sister had committed suicide last August 30, 2012 at the LRT 1 EDSA Station. Supporting Cast: LJ Reyes, Ervic Vijandre, Jace Flores, Jay Gonzaga, Jhoana Marie Tan, Raquel Villavicencio, Archie Adamos, Scarlet
3	"Pakawalang Anghel" (The Michelle Perez Story)	Ehra Madrigal, Joyce Ching, Lenlen Frial	Gina Alajar	Aloy Adlawan	January 19, 2013
Michelle was an adopted child who was nutured with love and affection. One night, when she was young, she was sexually assaulted by an unknown assailant. There, she became rebellious and addicted to drugs. After many years, she become a changed person. Supporting Cast: Jan Marini, Arthur Solinap, Jomari Yllana, Yayo Aguila, Teejay Marquez, Mel Kimura, Ruru Madrid, Krizzie Martinez, Joseph Izon, Sheena Barboza
4	"Ligaw na Diyosa" (The Katrina Halili Story)	Katrina Halili	Gina Alajar	Dode Cruz	January 26, 2013
After joining the artista search "Starstruck" in 2003, Katrina Halili's career was on the rise when she took on villain roles and became a sex symbol. However when she was involved in a video scandal with Dr. Hayden Kho in 2009, her career was already written as finished by some. But with determination and a new-found love, she overcomes adversity. Supporting Cast: Kris Lawrence, Marky Lopez, Allan Paule, Timmy Cruz, Anita Linda, Rocky Salumbides, Maritoni Fernandez, Baby Katrence
5	"Kagat ng Asong Ulol" (The Eduardo Sese Story)	Gabby Eigenmann, Rochelle Pangilinan	Albert Langitan	Des Garbes-Severino	February 2, 2013
Dogs are said to be "Man's Bestfriend", but can be its worst enemy. It happened when Eduardo is tending to his dogs, when one of them bit him. It turned out that one of his dogs is contracted with Rabies. Supporting Cast: Ces Quesada, Irma Adlawan, Maybelyn dela Cruz, Kris Martinez, Yutaka Yamakawa
6	"The Wally Bayola Story"	Wally Bayola	Ricky Davao	Marlon Miguel	February 9, 2013
Supporting Cast: Ara Mina, Irene Celebre, Arnold Reyes, Jessette Prospero, Boboy Garrovillo, Bing Davao, Tetay, Sef Cadayona, Yassi Pressman, Akeem Aldover, Sean Antoine
7	"My Only Love" (The Leonard & Nonyx Buela Love Story)	Carla Abellana, Geoff Eigenmann	Andoy Ranay	Maribel Ilag	February 16, 2013
Supporting Cast: Tetchie Agbayani, Simon Ibarra, Don Umali
8	"Bayaning Yagit" (The Kesz Valdez Story)	Vincent Magbanua	Dondon Santos	Rona Lean Sales	February 23, 2013
Supporting Cast: Benjie Paras, Paolo Contis, Ana Capri, Sheena Halili, Buboy Villar
9	"Gang Rape" (The Elsa de Guzman Story)	Lovi Poe, Jackie Rice	Laurice Guillen	Kit Villanueva-Langit	March 2, 2013
Best friends Elsa and Vivian who are working in a pizza parlor are having a night out and spend some leisure time. While going home, they are invited to ride in a van when they ended up getting raped and impregnated by men who are not acquainted by each other. Supporting Cast: Shamaine Buencamino, Angie Ferro, Shermaine Santiago, Reika Suzuki, Melissa Mendez, Victor Aliwalas
10	"The Alden Richards Story"	Alden Richards	Gina Alajar	Suzette Doctolero & Jason Lim	March 9, 2013
Before becoming one of GMA Network's admired leading man, Richard Faulkerson Jr., a simple young man is pursued by his mother to enter showbiz because of his good looks. Their dreams shattered when Rosario was diagnosed with lung cancer and died. However, he didn't give up until he became known in the entertainment industry as Alden Richards. Supporting Cast: Mark Gil, Jackie Lou Blanco, Lui Manansala, Louise delos Reyes, Yssa Muhlach, Christian Ramirez, DJ Kara
11	"Ang Tatay Kong Beki" (The Ruben Marasigan Story)	Keempee de Leon	Albert Langitan	Senedy Que	March 16, 2013
Supporting Cast: Gladys Reyes, Mon Confiado, Rosemarie Sarita, Marc Justine Alvarez, Jet Alcantara, Bekimon, Rolando Inocencio
12	"Ang Huling Awit ng Puso" (The Susan Fuentes Story)	Glaiza de Castro, Aicelle Santos	Dominic Zapata	Senedy Que	March 23, 2013
Known as the "Queen of Visayan Songs", Susan Fuentes became known for some of her songs such as "Usahay". She had many struggles in life but her friend, Dulce became her shoulder to cry on. Supporting Cast: Emilio Garcia, Joshua Zamora, Faith Daryl da Silva, Renz Valerio
13	"Sex for Sale" (The Norma Diwa Story)	Agot Isidro	Dominic Zapata	Vienuel Ello	April 6, 2013
Supporting Cast: Ramon Christopher, Carlene Aguilar, Bubbles Paraiso, Ozu Ong, John Edric Ulang, Kate Dolino, Carl Acosta
14	"Life After the Death of Flor Contemplacion" (The Russel Contemplacion Story)	Alessandra de Rossi	Gil Tejada Jr.	Vienuel Ello	April 13, 2013
On March 17, 1995, Flor Contemplacion, an Overseas Filipino worker convicted for the murder of fellow OFW Delia Maga, was executed in Singapore. After 16 years, the Contemplacion family would suffer again. Flor's sons Xandrex, and twins Jonjon and Joel were convicted of selling drugs. What's worse is that, her father Efren was arrested for drugs. Supporting Cast: Roy Alvarez, Gerald Madrid, Banjo Romero, Chariz Solomon, Oscar Salva, Kenneth Salva
15	"Transman" (The Nil Nodalo Story)	Andrea Torres, Mike Tan	Dominic Zapata	Obet Villela	April 20, 2013
Supporting Cast: Sharmaine Arnaiz, Dion Ignacio, Ryza Cenon, Sabrina Man, Gabriel Roxas, Daniella Amable, Rhen Escaño, Roence Santos
16	"Bayarang Adonis" (The Kristoffer King Story)	Aljur Abrenica, Max Collins	Maryo J. de los Reyes	Paul Sta. Ana	April 27, 2013
Supporting Cast: Rina Reyes, Joel Saracho, Philip Lazaro, Gerry Lugod, Deborah Sun, Marc Justine Alvarez, Sandy Talag, Paul Guisande, Janna Trias
17	"Nasayang na Jackpot" (The Dionie Reyes Story)	Luis Alandy	Ricky Davao	Jason Lim	May 4, 2013
Dionie, a simple driver is a huge fan of Lotto. His luck changed when he won 14 million pesos in the Lotto. But, he became abusive to money. The result, all of his money was gone into waste in a span of 3 months. Supporting Cast: Jaclyn Jose, Dexter Doria, Karen delos Reyes, Gerard Pizarras, Chinggay Riego, Milkcah Wynne Nacion
18	"Batang Ina" (The Tintin Ng Story)	Krystal Reyes	Dominic Zapata	Senedy Que	May 11, 2013
Supporting Cast: Gardo Versoza, Ryan Eigenmann, Mayton Eugenio, Jamaica Olivera
19	"Child Rape Video Scandal" (The Jessa Aquino Story)	Angelu de Leon	Laurice Guillen	Senedy Que	May 18, 2013
Supporting Cast: Raquel Monteza, Neil Ryan Sese, Tess Bomb, Conrado Peru, Byron Ortile, Kyle Ocampo
20	"The Prolen Bonacua Story"	TJ Trinidad	Topel Lee	Des Garbes-Severino	May 25, 2013
Supporting Cast: Camille Prats, Rez Cortez, Lovely Rivero, JC Tiuseco, Jade Lopez, Kiel Rodriguez, Alvin Aragon, Gino dela Pena
21	"The Louise delos Reyes Story"	Louise delos Reyes	Gil Tejada Jr.	Vienuel Ello	June 1, 2013
Supporting Cast: Jomari Yllana, Jan Marini, Ken Chan, Yassi Pressman, Rox Montealegre, Sasha Baldoza, Alden Richards
22	"Sa Hirap at Ginhawa" (The Susan Maniego Story)	Lorna Tolentino	Laurice Guillen	Rona Lean Sales	June 8, 2013
Supporting Cast: Michael de Mesa, Isabel Oli, Polo Ravales, Arnold Reyes, Sheila Marie Rodriguez, Frencheska Farr, Arny Ross
23	"Flowers of Hope" (The Rolando Niangar Story)	Ogie Alcasid	Dondon Santos	Mary Rose Colindres	June 15, 2013
Supporting Cast: Manilyn Reynes, Spanky Manikan, Eva Darren, Lexi Fernandez, Mona Louise Rey, Jeric Gonzales, Thea Tolentino
24	"The Glaiza de Castro Story"	Glaiza de Castro	Mark A. Reyes	Geng Delgado	June 22, 2013
Supporting Cast: Rio Locsin, Allan Paule, Dominic Roco, Vaness del Moral, Alchris Galura, Manny Castañeda
25	"May AIDS ang Asawa Ko"	Jennylyn Mercado, Mark Herras	Laurice Guillen	Senedy Que	June 29, 2013
Supporting Cast: Gwen Zamora, Cara Eriguel, Kathleen Hermosa, Bing Davao, Miggy Jimenez, Daniella Amable, Christian Ramirez
26	"Lubog sa Putik" (The Quezon Flash Flood Tragedy)	Mark Anthony Fernandez	Adolf Alix Jr.	Vienuel Ello	July 6, 2013
Supporting Cast: Renz Fernandez, Chynna Ortaleza, Rich Asuncion, Nicole Dulalia, Rose Ann Magan, Rain Quite, Banjo Romero
27	"Kabang: Hero Dog"	Ricky Davao	Roderick Lindayag	Glaiza Ramirez	July 13, 2013
Supporting Cast: Snooky Serna, Perla Bautista, Jillian Ward, Akeem Aldover, Shyr Valdez, Marlon Mance
28	"Ang Lola Prosti" (The Baby Tsina Story)	Tessie Tomas	Maryo J. de los Reyes	Senedy Que	July 20, 2013
Supporting Cast: Daria Ramirez, Freddie Webb, Wynwyn Marquez, Ynna Asistio, Orlando Sol, Dan Alvaro, Rodel Villa, Celia Aquino, Richard Arma, Manix Saberon, CJ Papa, Larry Laracas
29	"Kasalanan Ba Ang Umibig?" (The Myrna Rivas Story)	Pauleen Luna	Maryo J. de los Reyes	Mary Rose Colindres	July 27, 2013
Supporting Cast: Yul Servo, Michael Rivero, Melissa Mendez, Menggie Cobarrubias, Lloyd Samartino, Rosamarie Sarita, Diana Alferez, Prince Vinculado
30	"Isang Linggong Pag-ibig" (The Arlene Tolibas Story)	Sunshine Dizon	Gina Alajar	Agnes Gagelonia-Uligan	August 3, 2013
Supporting Cast: Maybelyn dela Cruz, Dexter Doria, Rolando Inocencio, Rita De Guzman, Fabio Ide, Elle Ramirez, Justin de Leon, Rico Barrera, Hideo Muraoka
31	"Coming Out" (The Charice Pempengco Story)	Charice Pempengco	Maryo J. de los Reyes	Gilbeys Sardea	August 10, 2013
In 2008, Charice Pempengco became an international sensation for the video of her performance in a show in South Korea. She became hit for her guesting in The Ellen DeGeneres Show, The Oprah Winfrey Show and in David Foster and Friends, and most especially for her songs such as Pyramid, Louder and many others. In 2012, many were shocked for her new look, far from her image, causing a misunderstanding with her mother Raquel. The following year, she revealed that she is a lesbian and had a relationship with Alyssa Quijano. Supporting Cast: Glydel Mercado, Ryza Cenon, Jan Manual, Miguel Tanfelix, Rose Ann Magan, Papa Dudut, Gorgy Rula, Clarise Mae Balasan, Krissie Rose Martinez
32	"Hinagpis ng Isang Ina" (The Rape of an Autistic Child)	Jean Garcia	Adolf Alix Jr.	Gilbeys Sardea	August 17, 2013
Supporting Cast: Joko Diaz, Barbara Miguel, Alicia Alonzo, Shermaine Santiago, Fonz Deza, JM Reyes, Sue Prado, Yutaka Yamakawa, Jethro Ramirez
33	"The Ryzza Mae Dizon Story"	Ryzza Mae Dizon	Ricky Davao	Senedy Que	August 24, 2013
Note: Replay story on December 8, 2012. Supporting Cast: Manilyn Reynes, Yul Servo, Pen Medina, Nova Villa, Diego Llorico
34	"Ang Unang Lipad ng Super Sireyna" (The Francine Garcia Story)	Francine Garcia	Maryo J. de los Reyes	Senedy Que	August 31, 2013
Supporting Cast: Rita Avila, Boy 2 Quizon, Jordan Herrera, Marc Justine Alvarez, Jerould Aceron, Byron Ortile, Jon Romano, Ozu Ong, Mimi Juareza
35	"Sa Kabila ng Hirap" (The Garrido Family Story)	Enzo Pineda, Janine Gutierrez	Adolf Alix Jr.	Gilbeys Sardea	September 7, 2013
Supporting Cast: Rez Cortez, Chanda Romero, Miggs Cuaderno
36	"Prinsesa ng Mga Pipi" (The Princess Pura Story)	Kylie Padilla	Neal del Rosario	Senedy Que	September 14, 2013
Supporting Cast: Jessa Zaragoza, Arthur Solinap, Pekto, Mona Louise Rey, Bebong Osorio, Luz Valdez
37	"Ang Nag-iisang Kontrabida ng Buhay Ko" (The Rez & Candy Cortez Story)	Mark Herras, Tess Bomb	Neal del Rosario	Denoy Punio	September 21, 2013
Before becoming one of the most hated villains, but well respected thespians in the Philippine entertainment industry, Rez Cortez was first known as a dancer in a variety show. His good looks captivate Candy who would later be his wife. Supporting Cast: Nova Villa, Jim Paredes, Jade Lopez, Marnie Lapuz, Joseph Izon, Jon Romano, Lotlot Bustamante, Oscar Salva, Citadel Mariano
38	"Child for Sale" (The Buboy Liit Story)	Camille Prats	Adolf Alix Jr.	Gilbeys Sardea	September 28, 2013
Supporting Cast: Yul Servo, Pancho Magno, Vaness del Moral, Dex Quindoza, Arnold Reyes, Idda Yaneza, Eunice Lagusad
39	"Sinunog ng Buhay" (The Margarita Trinidad Story)	Sheena Halili	Argel Joseph	Jason Lim	October 5, 2013
Supporting Cast: Raymond Bagatsing, Isabel Oli, Tanya Gomez, Gino dela Pena, Michael de Mesa
40	"Lunod na Pag-ibig" (The Cebu Ship-Collision Tragedy)	Yasmien Kurdi, Michelle Madrigal, JC Tiuseco, Rodjun Cruz	Argel Joseph	Vienuel Ello	October 12, 2013
Supporting Cast: Allan Paule
41	"School Bullying Caught on Cam"	Bianca Umali, Sabrina Man, Nicole Dulalia	Aloy Adlawan	Aloy Adlawan	October 19, 2013
Upon reaching the seventh grade, Abby enrolls at the public high school where she encounters bullies led by Maxine and later she is physically assaulted by these people. Supporting Cast: Shamaine Buencamino, John Arcilla, Rich Asuncion, Shyr Valdez, Vincent Magbanua, Julia Chua, Jerould Aceron, Brix Sanchez, Perla Bautista
42	"The Miriam Castillo Story"	Gina Alajar	Ricky Davao	Des Garbes-Severino	October 26, 2013
Note: Replay story on December 29, 2012. Supporting Cast: Dante Rivero, Miguel Jimenez, Bodie Cruz, Patricia Ysmael, Miggs Cuaderno, Nicky Castro, Marco Alcaraz
43	"Kambal na Sapi"	Barbie Forteza, Krystal Reyes	Topel Lee	Jules Katanyag	November 2, 2013
Supporting Cast: Roi Vinzon, Neil Ryan Sese, Sharmaine Arnaiz, Lou Veloso, Gwen Zamora, Mymy Davao, Ervic Vijandre, Ces Aldaba
44	"My Beautiful Daughter" (The Maxino Family Story)	Brina Maxino, Gardo Versoza, Jaclyn Jose	Dominic Zapata	Jonathan Cruz & Senedy Que	November 9, 2013
For Winston and Alina, their second child Brina, who has downs syndrome, is their source of joy and pride. This despite all the discrimination and ridicule their daughter endures. But Brina's intellect despite her disability was the family's inspiration. Supporting Cast: Louise delos Reyes, Barbara Miguel, Kyle Ocampo, Sheila Marie Rodriguez, Annette Mari Samin
45	"Peligro sa Sariling Bahay" (The Art Evangelista Story)	Gabby Eigenmann	Andoy Ranay	Des Garbes-Severino	November 16, 2013
Art owns a salon with his elder sister Lulu. He became the family's breadwinner. But, Art would face a tragic ordeal when he was attacked by a man he invited. Supporting Cast: Glydel Mercado, Gerard Pizarras, Kevin Santos, Bekimon, Chromewell Cosio, Elle Ramirez, Carl Acosta, Miko Cruz, Geraldine Villamil
46	"Kriminal na Biktima sa Saudi Arabia" (The Dondon Lanuza Story)	Alden Richards	Adolf Alix Jr.	Rona Lean Sales	November 23, 2013
Wilfredo "Dondon" Lanuza had to work in Saudi Arabia to help his family. But, he would be accused of murder and sentenced to death, after killing an Arabian attempting to rape him. Despite everything, he was spared from death and was eventually released. Supporting Cast: Jestoni Alarcon, Lani Mercado, Ryan Eigenmann, Marc Abaya, John Feir
47	"Sa Mata ng Daluyong" (The Typhoon Yolanda Tragedy)	Sunshine Dizon, Paolo Contis	Argel Joseph	Jason Lim	November 30, 2013
The GMA News team composed of Love Añover, Jiggy Manicad and Michaela Papa went to Leyte, the province that would be hit by Typhoon Yolanda. Jiggy would be left in Tacloban while Love went to Palo. There, Love and Jiggy would witness the devastation that brought about by the strongest and deadliest typhoon that hit the country. Love was inside the Palo Cathedral where she witness the total destruction of the Church. Supporting Cast: Bembol Roco, Maey Bautista, Justin de Leon, Rico Barrera, Aicelle Santos, Alicia Alonzo, Eva Darren, Crispin Pineda
48	"Ang Huwad na Sugo" (The Sex Cult Story)	Michael De Mesa	Neal del Rosario	Vienuel Ello	December 7, 2013
Supporting Cast: Jomari Yllana, Ana Capri, Mel Kimura, Marc Acueza, Elle Ramirez, JM Reyes, Kimberly Fulgar, Gigi Locsin, Raul Russo, Richard Manabat
49	"Lola Putol" (The Veronica Martinez Story)	Rita Avila	Andoy Ranay	Senedy Que	December 14, 2013
Supporting Cast: Luis Alandy, Mercedes Cabral, Anita Linda, Jerould Aceron, Aaron Ching
50	"Kislap ng Parol"	Eula Valdez	Michael de Mesa	Michiko Yamamoto	December 21, 2013
Supporting Cast: Emilio Garcia, Jenny Miller, Nova Villa, Diva Montelaba, Ruru Madrid, Alvin Aragon, Dennis Marasigan, Christian Ramirez, Sunyee Maluche
51	"The Nanay Silveria Story"	Jean Garcia	Gina Alajar	Des Garbes-Severino	December 28, 2013
Note: Replay story on December 15, 2012. Supporting Cast: Gary Estrada, Kristofer Martin, Julian Trono, Mymy Davao, Chynna Ortaleza, Daria Ramirez, Denzel Santiago, Justin de Leon

=== 2014 ===
No. in season	Title	Cast	Directed by	Written by	Original release date
1	"Kambal na Lihim"	Glaiza de Castro	Argel Joseph	Vienuel Ello	January 4, 2014
Twins Ayana and Aleli (both played by Glaiza de Castro) would meet a man named Leo, who was Ayana's boss. Leo had a deep feelings for Aleli. But, Aleli was hesitant, forcing Leo to rape and marry Ayana. However, Leo had a deep feelings for Ayana. However, Ayana married and had a child. Leo had other plans, he sexually abused Ayana's daughter. Supporting Cast: Mike Tan, Irma Adlawan, Pen Medina, Dominic Roco, Milkcah Wynne Nacion, Aldrich Darren
2	"Ama, Ina, Anak" (The Marlon de Leon Story)	Rocco Nacino	Maryo J. de los Reyes	Senedy Que	January 11, 2014
Supporting Cast: Katrina Halili, Xyruz Cruz, Nafa Hilario-Cruz, Evelyn Santos
3	"Ang Huling Dasal ng Isang Ina" (The Jacky Pantilgan Story)	Angelu de Leon	Argel Joseph	Jonathan Cruz	January 18, 2014
Supporting Cast: Ryan Eigenmann, Chanda Romero, Rich Asuncion, Lovely Embuscado
4	"Persia: Asong Kanal"	Andrea Torres	Neal del Rosario	Agnes G. Gagelonia-Uligan	January 25, 2014
Supporting Cast: Gladys Reyes, Raymond Bagatsing, Sharmaine Arnaiz, Miggs Cuaderno, Art Acuña, Zandra Summer, Linda Backlund
5	"Sa Kamay ni Misis"	Rodjun Cruz	Argel Joseph	Agnes G. Gagelonia-Uligan	February 1, 2014
Supporting Cast: Kris Bernal, Steven Silva, Lani Mercado, Phillip Salvador
6	"Nakakulong na Puso" (The Andrea de Leon Story)	Bela Padilla	Argel Joseph	Jason Lim	February 8, 2014
Supporting Cast: Dion Ignacio, Pancho Magno, Neil Ryan Sese, Ernie Garcia, Dexter Doria, Lovely Rivero, Frencheska Farr, Joy Velasco
7	"Ang Aking Kakaibang Pag-ibig" (The Jing & Clemen Love Story)	Chynna Ortaleza, Isabelle Daza	Andoy Ranay	Vienuel Ello	February 15, 2014
Supporting Cast: Gloria Romero, John Arcilla, Susan Africa, Luis Alandy, Robert Ortega, Dolly de Leon, Julia Chua
8	"My Love Forever"	Jaclyn Jose	Andoy Ranay	Michiko Yamamoto	February 22, 2014
Supporting Cast: Ruru Madrid, Mike Tan, Ash Ortega, Elijah Alejo, Mikoy Morales, Girlie Sevilla, Dex Quindoza, Arny Ross, Denzel Santiago, Nicole Donesa, Geraldine Villamil, JC Santos
9	"Mga Bagong Mandirigma" (The Eduard Folayang & Mark Sangiao Story)	Dennis Trillo, Tom Rodriguez	Neal del Rosario	Jules Kantayag	March 1, 2014
Eduard Folayang's dream of becoming a mixed martial arts fighter is disapproved by his father. Mark Sangiao, an experienced mixed martial artist tries to balance his time for his family. The two fighters would emerge themselves in Philippine sports industry, that led to the formation of "Team Lakay". Supporting Cast: Sheena Halili, Bembol Roco, Snooky Serna, Andrew Schimmer, Sean Ross
10	"Barangay Cybersex" (The Jenna Espinosa Story)	Lauren Young	Neal del Rosario	Glaiza Ramirez	March 8, 2014
Supporting Cast: Rez Cortez, Glydel Mercado, Leandro Baldemor, Maureen Larrazabal, Ynez Veneracion, Teejay Marquez, Buboy Villar, Mara Lopez, Phytos Ramirez
11	"Gas Mo, Bukas Ko" (The Joel & Jovel Javier Story)	Aljur Abrenica, Alden Richards	Argel Joseph	Rhoda Sulit	March 15, 2014
Supporting Cast: Charee Pineda, Lotlot de Leon, Yayo Aguila, Menggie Cobarrubias, Chinggay Riego, Diva Montelaba, Christian Bautista, Bettina Carlos, Shyr Valdez
12	"My Psychotic Husband"	Lovi Poe, Gabby Eigenmann, Alessandra de Rossi	Maryo J. de los Reyes	Aloy Adlawan	March 22, 2014
Supporting Cast: Marita Zobel, Aicelle Santos, Dan Alvaro, Hershey Garcia, Janna Trias, Prince Vinluan
13	"Pakawalang Anghel" (The Michelle Perez Story)	Ehra Madrigal, Joyce Ching, Lenlen Frial	Gina Alajar	Aloy Adlawan	March 29, 2014
Note: Replay story on January 19, 2013. Supporting Cast: Jan Marini, Arthur Solinap, Jomari Yllana, Yayo Aguila, Teejay Marquez, Mel Kimura, Ruru Madrid, Krizzie Martinez, Joseph Izon, Shenna Barboza
14	"Life After Death" (The Justine Sison Story)	Rhian Ramos	Neal del Rosario	Vienuel Ello	April 5, 2014
Supporting Cast: Paolo Contis, Dante Rivero, Alicia Alonzo, Marc Justine Alvarez, Justine de Leon, Fonz Deza, Chromewell Cosio, Ronalisa Cheng, Ruby Flores
15	"Sinapupunang Paupahan" (The Naneth Villegas Story)	Carla Abellana	Laurice Guillen	Venjie Pallena	April 12, 2014
Supporting Cast: Ryan Eigenmann, Jenine Desiderio, Ina Feleo, Sue Prado, Orlando Sol
16	"Siga Noon, Beki Ngayon" (The Christopher Villegas Story)	Kristofer Martin	Neal del Rosario	Michiko Yamamoto	April 26, 2014
Influenced by his abusive father, Christopher learned to hate gay people especially his older gay brother. But, he would found himself confused and frustrated. He soon realized that he is one of those people whom he hated so much. Christopher, a tough man would found himself as gay. Supporting Cast: Michael de Mesa, Shamaine Buencamino, Maricris Garcia, Jan Manual, Mark Herras, Bryan Benedict, Byron Ortile, Jerould Aceron, Jerald Napoles
17	"One Last Chance" (The Jam & Mich Story)	Jake Vargas, Yassi Pressman	Jun Lana	Dode Cruz	May 3, 2014
Before becoming an online sensation, Jam Sebastian and Mich Liggayu are in a relationship for five years. However, Mich's parents disapproves at first because Jam didn't finish his studies and became addicted in gambling. But, during their popularity, Jam was diagnosed with lung cancer. Supporting Cast: Ces Quesada, Enzo Pineda, Gabbi Garcia, Frances Makil-Ignacio, Froilan Sales, Don Umali
18	"A Mother's Sacrifice" (The Rebecca Advincula Story)	Sheena Halili	Argel Joseph	Agnes G. Gagelonia-Uligan	May 10, 2014
A single mother, Rebecca wants to provide everything for her son Jason. One day, Jason suddenly disappeared. She would found out, that her only son was killed by an unknown assailant. Supporting Cast: Lani Mercado, TJ Trinidad, Allan Paule, Lovely Embuscado, Andres Vasquez, Nicoli Lista, Carlos Aquee Santos
19	"Tatay na si Totoy, Nanay na si Nene" (The Moymoy & Rina Story)	Ruru Madrid, Ashley Ortega	Argel Joseph	Senedy Que	May 17, 2014
Supporting Cast: Melissa de Leon, Ryza Cenon, Raymond Bagatsing, Nicole Dulalia, Raul Russo
20	"Magkasalo sa Pugad" (The George & Francia Ramillo Story)	Luis Alandy, Glaiza de Castro	Gina Alajar	Senedy Que	May 24, 2014
Supporting Cast: Pauleen Luna, Gilleth Sandico, Idda Yaneza, Bebong Osorio, Kenneth Salva
21	"Pabrika ng Bata"	Christopher de Leon, Jean Garcia	Argel Joseph	Agnes G. Gagelonia-Uligan	May 31, 2014
Supporting Cast: Eva Darren, Jennica Garcia, JC Tiuseco, Rainier Castillo, Michelle Madrigal, Rodjun Cruz, Diva Montelaba, Teejay Marquez, Rhen Escaño, Denise Barbacena, JM Reyes, Miggy Jimenez, Vincent Magbanua, Nomer Limatog, Vien Alen King, Denzel Santiago, Ashley Cabrera
22	"Mag-inang Aborsiyonista" (The Azon & Alvin Abad Story)	Lorna Tolentino, Renz Fernandez	Neal del Rosario	Renei Dimla	June 7, 2014
Supporting Cast: John Arcilla, Rox Montealegre, Mariel Pamintuan, AJ Dee, Stephanie Sol, Maritess Joaquin, Cogie Domingo
23	"Retokadang Ina" (The Michelle Villamor Story)	Glydel Mercado	Neal del Rosario	Glaiza Ramirez	June 14, 2014
At an early age, Michelle had to marry a man older than her. However, she suffered not only physical but verbal aubses from her husband causing her to be separated from her children. One day, she visited a cosmetic surgeon and underwent a series of plastic surgeries. But, instead of making her beautiful, it only makes it worst. Supporting Cast: Liza Lorena, Yayo Aguila, Shyr Valdez, Dominic Roco, Krystal Reyes, Joyce Ching, Ken Chan
24	"Kusina Master, The Best Father" (The Pablo Logro Story)	Boy Logro	Argel Joseph	Venjie Pallena	June 21, 2014
Before making a name on Philippine television because of his cooking skills and a sense of humor, Chef Boy started from nothing. He was first a household helper in a restaurant in Manila, he would eventually become an executive chef to various heads of state from around the world including Queen Elizabeth II. He would eventually become the very first Filipino executive chef of a 5-star restaurant. But despite all of the fame he's receiving, is being a father to his children despite hating his own father when he was young. Supporting Cast: Phillip Salvador, Glenda Garcia, Tanya Gomez, LJ Reyes, Betong Sumaya, Marc Acueza, Ozu Ong
25	"Pinutol na Kaligayahan" (The Lito & Lenlyn Bayabados Story)	Sunshine Dizon, Mark Anthony Fernandez	Neal del Rosario	Vienuel Ello	June 28, 2014
Supporting Cast: Vaness del Moral, Rap Fernandez, Kiko Estrada, Hershey Garcia, Ana Castro
26	"Dalawang Kasarian" (The Jonalyn Bulado Story)	Lauren Young	Neal del Rosario	Venjie Pellena	July 5, 2014
Supporting Cast: Rommel Padilla, Lovely Rivero, Tina Paner, Caridad Sanchez, Rico Barrera, Ar Angel Aviles, Juancho Trivino
27	"Kulam ng Paghihiganti" (The Glenda Marasigan Story)	Kris Bernal	Argel Joseph	Vienuel Ello	July 12, 2014
Supporting Cast: Roi Vinzon, Emilio Garcia, Dexter Doria, Luz Fernandez, Ernie Zarate, Elle Ramirez, Jaclyn Jose
28	"Ama Ko, Mahal Ko" (The Kim Fajardo Story)	Louise delos Reyes	Gil Tejada Jr.	Michiko Yamamoto	July 19, 2014
Supporting Cast: Ricky Davao, Gina Alajar, Mel Kimura, Phytos Ramirez, Kyle Ocampo, Bryan Benedict, Resee Tayag, Jon Romano
29	"Isinakdal Ko Ang Aking Anak" (The Julita Relano Story)	Lani Mercado	Gil Tejada Jr.	Evie Macapugay	July 26, 2014
Supporting Cast: Al Tantay, Alden Richards, Bettina Carlos, Melissa Mendez, Arthur Solinap, Justin de Leon, Lian Paz, Vince Velasco
30	"Asawa Mo, Hiniram Ko" (The Noah & Mae Castillo Story)	Bela Padilla	Argel Joseph	Senedy Que	August 2, 2014
Supporting Cast: Jackie Rice, Rafael Rosell, Mike Tan, Joseph Izon, Val Victa
31	"Habang Buhay na Maghihintay" (The Elvira Bolos Story)	Mickey Ferriols, Yasmien Kurdi	Gil Portes	Senedy Que	August 9, 2014
Supporting Cast: Chanda Romero, James Blanco, Lollie Mara, Sef Cadayona, JC Tiuseco, Miggs Cuaderno, Jess Evardone, Shermaine Santiago, Denzel Santiago
32	"My Beautiful Daughter" (The Maxino Family Story)	Brina Maxino, Gardo Versoza, Jaclyn Jose	Dominic Zapata	Jonathan Cruz & Senedy Que	August 16, 2014
Note: Replay story on November 9, 2013. Supporting Cast: Louise delos Reyes, Barbara Miguel, Kyle Ocampo, Sheila Marie Rodriguez, Annette Mari Samin
33	"Ang Ina na Hindi Malilimutan" (The Lauro Tuaño Story)	Martin del Rosario	Neal del Rosario	Senedy Que	August 23, 2014
Supporting Cast: Gina Pareño, Ryza Cenon, Aicelle Santos, Frencheska Farr, Raquel Pareño, Mike Lloren
34	"Girl Boy, Bakla, Tomboy" (The Humawid Family Story)	Shamaine Buencamino, John Arcilla, Rodjun Cruz, Joyce Ching	Joel Lamangan	Vienuel Ello	August 30, 2014
Supporting Cast: Dex Quindoza, Jerould Aceron, Coleen Borgonia, Jim Pebanco, Roence Santos, Kyle Ocampo, Byron Ortile, Ar Angel Aviles, Mega Unciano
35	"Ang Byudang Naka-itim" (The Rebecca Laurente Story)	Rhian Ramos	Gil Tejada Jr.	Venjie Pellena	September 6, 2014
Supporting Cast: Raymond Bagatsing, Mark Herras, Bobby Andrews, Neil Ryan Sese, Ina Feleo, Mariel Pamintuan, David Remo, Milkcah Wynne Nacion, Klariz Magboo, Kristoff Meneses
36	"Ang Babaeng May Dalawang Buhay" (The Monica "Baby Face" Salazar Story")	Gwen Zamora	Argel Joseph	Zita Garganera	September 13, 2014
Supporting Cast: Alfred Vargas, Jenny Miller, Chariz Solomon, Sheila Marie Rodriguez, Victor Basa, Tessie Tomas, Lester Llansang, Menggie Cobarrubias, Tess Bomb, Ronalisa Cheng, Hershey Garcia, Froilan Sales, Nicky Castro, Julia Chua, Ping Medina
37	"Ang Inang Yaya" (The Luningning Predilla Bebit Story)	Manilyn Reynes	Argel Joseph	Vienuel Ello	September 20, 2014
Supporting Cast: Gardo Versoza, Sharmaine Arnaiz, Bing Davao, Mymy Davao, Krystal Reyes, Rhett Romero, Mona Louise Rey, Nova Villa, Max Collins
38	"PNP: Pogi na Pulis" (The PO2 Mariano Flormata Jr. Story)	Neil Perez, Kristofer Martin	Gil Tejada Jr.	Venjie Pellena	September 27, 2014
Supporting Cast: Roi Vinzon, Irma Adlawan, Vaness del Moral, Vincent Magbanua, Kenneth Salva, Miggy Jimenez, Shelly Hipolito
39	"Nagliliyab na Puso" (The Mary Jane Decena Lorbes Story)	Katrina Halili, Paolo Contis	Maryo J. de los Reyes	Senedy Que	October 4, 2014
Supporting Cast: Tommy Abuel, Deborah Sun, Kyle Ocampo, Zarah Mae Deligero, Anikka Camaya, Xyrus Cruz
40	"Ang Paghihiganti ng Masamang Engkanto"	Sunshine Dizon, Jay Manalo	Argel Joseph	Leilani Chavez	October 11, 2014
Supporting Cast: Susan Africa, Spanky Manikan, Lollie Mara, Kiel Rodriguez, Nicole Dulalia, Johnny Regaña, Juancho Trivino, Rhen Escaño, Dante Castro
41	"Krimen sa Ngalan ng Puri" (The Arlene dela Cruz Story)	Lovi Poe, Benjamin Alves	Joel Lamangan	Leilani Chavez	October 18, 2014
Supporting Cast: Joko Diaz, Odette Khan, Jim Pebanco, Bebong Osorio, Chinggay Riego, Ken Alfonso
42	"Cain at Abel: Ang Kalakal Boys" (The Cedric Macdon and Joven Santos Story)	Ruru Madrid, Miguel Tanfelix	Maryo J. de los Reyes	Jason Lim	October 25, 2014
Supporting Cast: Celia Rodriguez, Maybelyn dela Cruz, Patricia Ysmael, Ash Ortega, Catherine Remperas
43	"Ang Nurse na May Ikatlong Mata" (The Jessa Montes Story)	Bela Padilla	Michael de Mesa	Vienel Ello	November 1, 2014
Supporting Cast: Ryan Eigenmann, Andrea del Rosario, Ramon Christopher, Melissa Mendez, Luz Valdez, Lovely Rivero, Arianne Bautista, Makee Dulalia
44	"Ang Pusong 'Di Makalimot" (The Faith Bacon Story)	Eula Valdez	Argel Joseph	Michiko Yamamoto	November 8, 2014
Supporting Cast: Mark Anthony Fernandez, Wynwyn Marquez, Krystal Reyes, Lucho Ayala, Julian Trono, Jak Roberto, Christian Ramirez, Raul Russo
45	"Henyo ng Bangketa" (The Gerald Tamayo Story)	Miggs Cuaderno	Neal del Rosario	Maribel Ilag	November 15, 2014
Supporting Cast: Gina Pareño, Mylene Dizon, Gerald Madrid, Ina Feleo, Rap Fernandez, Nomer Limatog
46	"Ama, Bakit Mo Ako Pinabayaan?" (The Ramil Ramos Story)	Kiko Estrada	Neal del Rosario	Maribel Ilag	November 22, 2014
Supporting Cast: Glydel Mercado, Michael de Mesa, Mel Martinez, Hiro Peralta, Sharmaine Suarez, Joshua Uy, Val Iglesias, Perry Escaño
47	"Ang Babaeng Ama" (The Mark Marzo Story)	Paolo Contis	Bb. Joyce Bernal	Seendy Que	November 29, 2014
A special anniversary presentation shot in Tokyo, Japan. Mark, a transgender work in Japan as an entertainer. However, upon coming home to visit his sick father, his dying wish is to have a grandson. Supporting Cast: Al Tantay, Glaiza de Castro, Gilleth Sandico, Satorou Baba, Chihara Satoshi, Dennis Bentulan, Joyce Akilya
48	"Sa Bangin ng Kamatayan" (The Benguet Jeepney Tragedy)	Joyce Ching, Kim Rodriguez, Jhoana Marie Tan	Ricky Davao	Senedy Que	December 6, 2014
The story about the tragedy that happened on Buguias, Benguet, when a jeepney fell off a ravine. Many died in this tragedy, most of them are students. Supporting Cast: Jaclyn Jose, Glenda Garcia, Susan Africa, Joseph Izon, Renz Valerio, Ashley Ortega, Elle Ramirez, Tricia Raj Cabais, Prince Villanueva, Rolando Inocencio, Paolo Rivero
49	"Ang Ina sa Gitna ng Tsunami" (The Lovely Pineda-Ishi Story)	Sunshine Dizon	Bb. Joyce Bernal	Jason Lim	December 13, 2014
Supporting Cast: Gabby Eigenmann, Aya Medel, Nina Kodaka, Akio Ogitan, Elai Hilario, Troy Justine Alvarez, Shun Ito, Marian Kazaoka, Maha Kazaoka, Angelo Roa
50	"Hari ng Kalsada: Traffic Enforcer, Turon Best-Seller" (The Fernando Gonzales Story)	Ricky Davao	Argel Joseph	Jessie G. Villabrille	December 20, 2014
The story of Fernando Gonzales, a traffic enforcer of the Metropolitan Manila Development Authority, whose picture and video selling rice cakes while off duty went viral. Supporting Cast: Lani Mercado, Alicia Alonzo, Robert Ortega, Sheila Marie Rodriguez, Rosemarie Sarita, Menggie Cobarrubias, Justin de Leon, Lou Sison, Karla Pambid, Banjo Romero, Rhett Romero
51	"Prinsesa ng Mga Pipi" (The Princess Pura Story)	Kylie Padilla	Neal del Rosario	Senedy Que	December 27, 2014
Note: Replay story on September 14, 2013. Supporting Cast: Jessa Zaragoza, Arthur Solinap, Pekto, Mona Louise Rey, Bebong Osorio, Luz Valdez

=== 2015 ===
No. in season	Title	Cast	Directed by	Written by	Original release date
1	"Ama Namin" (The Jesus Boy Parungao Story)	Christopher de Leon	Neal del Rosario	Rhoda Sulit	January 3, 2015
Supporting Cast: Rita Avila, Martin del Rosario, Mike Tan, Diva Montelaba, David Remo, Katrina Halili, Barbara Miguel, Milkcah Wynne Nacion, Gold Azeron, Selena Gonzales
2	"Pasan Ko, Kapatid Ko" (The Carlo Hufana Story)	Ruru Madrid, Miggs Cuaderno	Maryo J. de los Reyes	Michiko Yamamoto	January 10, 2015
Supporting Cast: Angelika dela Cruz, Leandro Baldemor, Shyr Valdez, Lui Manansala, Angeli Bayani, Prince Vinluan, Dennis Coronel
3	"May AIDS ang Asawa Ko"	Jennylyn Mercado, Mark Herras	Laurice Guillen	Senedy Que	January 17, 2015
Note: Replay story on June 29, 2013. Supporting Cast: Gwen Zamora, Cara Eriguel, Kathleen Hermosa, Bing Davao, Miggy Jimenez, Daniella Amable, Christian Ramirez
4	"Sa Mata ng Daluyong" (The Typhoon Yolanda Tragedy)	Sunshine Dizon, Paolo Contis	Argel Joseph	Jason Lim	January 24, 2015
Note: Replay story on November 30, 2013. Supporting Cast: Bembol Roco, Maey Bautista, Justin de Leon, Rico Barrera, Aicelle Santos, Alicia Alonzo, Eva Darren, Crispin Pineda
5	"Sa Ngalan ng Anak" (The Cerbito Family Story)	Mark Anthony Fernandez, Chynna Ortaleza	Joel Lamangan	Senedy Que	January 31, 2015
Supporting Cast: Bodjie Pascua, Jim Pebanco, Chanda Romero, Girlie Sevilla, Barbara Miguel
6	"Apoy ng Pangarap" (The Beverly Grimaldo Story)	Lovi Poe	Argel Joseph	Vienuel Ello	February 7, 2015
Beverly wanted to become a policewoman like her father. However, after graduating from the Philippine National Police Academy, she was assigned to the Bureau of Fire Protection. She would prove that she can be a firefighter, even she is a woman. Supporting Cast: Al Tantay, Snooky Serna, Derick Monasterio, Elle Ramirez, Ozu Ong, Jillian Ward, Kyle Ocampo, Raul Russo
7	"Love After the Storm" (The Joel Aradana & Juvilyn Luaña-Tañega Love Story )	Gardo Versoza, Mylene Dizon	Neal del Rosario	Senedy Que	February 14, 2015
Juvilyn and Joel both lost their families when Typhoon Yolanda hit Central Visayas. But, the storm would prove that love would conquer. Supporting Cast: Roi Vinzon, Don Umali, Gene Padilla, Francine Garcia, Ar Angel Aviles, Jenny Alvarez
8	"Walang Hanggang Paalam" (The Pedro Arnado Story)	Cris Villanueva, Joyce Ching, Kristofer Martin, Mickey Ferriols	Neal del Rosario	Jessie G. Villabrille	February 21, 2015
Supporting Cast: Toby Alejar, Irene Celebre, Jan Marini, Dex Quindoza, Coleen Perez, Arianne Bautista, Gigi Locsin
9	"Ang Lolang Mapagbiro" (The Josefina Arellano Story)	Gina Pareño	Neal del Rosario	Maribel Ilag	February 28, 2015
Widowed without a child, Josefina grew old alone. But, her sense of humor would ease her burden. Supporting Cast: Anita Linda, Perla Bautista, Charee Pineda, Mel Kimura, Tess Bomb, Crispin Pineda, Eva Darren, Menggie Cobarrubias, Robert Ortega
10	"Anak, Kapatid, Ina"	Yasmien Kurdi, Louise delos Reyes	Neal del Rosario	Michiko Yamamoto	March 7, 2015
Supporting Cast: Glydel Mercado, Emilio Garcia, Bryan Benedict, Milkcah Wynne Nacion, Hershey Garcia, Janna Trias, Kristoffer King, Robin Robell
11	"Ang Mamatay ng Dahil Sa'yo" (The PO2 Ephraim "Bok" Mejia Story)	Rhian Ramos, Dennis Trillo, Mike Tan	Albert Langitan	Albert Langitan	March 14, 2015
The story of PO2 Ephraim "Bok" Mejia, one of the 44 officers of the Philippine National Police Special Action Force, who perished during the siege in Mamasapano, Maguindanao. Supporting Cast: Melissa Mendez, Lovely Rivero, Mike Lloren, Vincent Magbanua, Byron Ortile, Elijah Alejo
12	"Masuwerteng Pinay sa Brunei" (The Kathelyn Dela Cruz Dupaya Story)	Sheryl Cruz	Neal del Rosario	Senedy Que	March 21, 2015
After finishing her studies, Kathelyn decided to work in Brunei and had a family. Her luck changed when she won a jackpot prize in the lottery several times. Despite all the riches and the good life she had, there is one thing that she is missing, the love of her mother. Supporting Cast: Tessie Tomas, Gary Estrada, Carmi Martin, Bebong Osorio, Thea Tolentino, Jeric Gonzales, Marlyn Kaye Dupaya, Micole Dupaya, Mikee Dupaya, Mike Dupaya, Maria Kristina Dupaya
13	"Love Me for What I Am" (The Shem & Jennessa Dizon Story)	Max Collins, Rodjun Cruz	Neal del Rosario	Senedy Que	March 28, 2015
Supporting Cast: Allan Paule, Ina Feleo, Lester Llansang, Abel Estanislao, Kyle Ocampo, Marc Justine Alvarez
14	"Boses ng Puso" (The Roland "Bunot" Abante Story)	Mark Bautista, Sheena Halili	Gina Alajar	Venjie Pellena	April 11, 2015
Orphaned at an early age, Ronald grew up with his aunt who treated him as her own son, but not her husband. His dream of becoming a singer is pursued by his mother when he was young. Until his video singing "To Love Somebody" become an instant hit. His singing voice similar to that of Michael Bolton became his ticket to success. Supporting Cast: Frencheska Farr, Bing Davao, Anna Marin, Diego Castro, Jak Roberto, Harvey Almoneda, Ronald 'Bunot' Abante
15	"Alab ng Puso" (The Nicky Nacino Jr. Story)	Rocco Nacino, Kris Bernal	Albert Langitan	Aloy Adlawan	April 18, 2015
A former teacher, Nicky decided to enter the Philippine National Police. He was then assigned to the Special Action Force. His dedication to duty led to his heroic deed, by becoming one of the 44 officers of SAF who died during the encounter in Mamasapano, Maguindanao Supporting Cast: Glenda Garcia, Ken Chan, Mymy Davao, Simon Ibarra, Art Acuña, Arny Ross
16	"Kapatid sa Ina" (The Jason Delgado & Alvin Fontanilla Story)	Kiko Estrada, Jake Vargas	Albert Langitan	Michiko Yamamoto	April 25, 2015
Supporting Cast: Luz Fernandez, Lotlot de Leon, Jhoana Marie Tan, Carl Acosta
17	"Sa Ngalan ng Pagmamahal" (The Alex Bernardo Story)	Martin del Rosario	Neal del Rosario	Michiko Yamamoto	May 2, 2015
Supporting Cast: Princess Punzalan, Vaness del Moral, Rich Asuncion, Rap Fernandez, Chinggay Riego, Elle Ramirez
18	"Inang Yaya" (The Nieves Limpin Story)	Nova Villa	Ricky Davao	Senedy Que	May 9, 2015
Supporting Cast: Ashley Ortega, Mona Louise Rey, Lauren Young, Arthur Solinap, Derick Monasterio, Miggs Cuaderno, Mickey Ferriols, Ken Alfonso, Sheila Marie Rodriguez, Bebong Osorio, Rustica Carpio, Tanya Gomez, Shelly Hipolito, Denzel Santiago
19	"Mga Anak ng Aking Asawa"	Ai-Ai Delas Alas	Gina Alajar	Jason Lim	May 16, 2015
Supporting Cast: Jay Manalo, Ana Capri, Mel Kimura, Sancho Delas Alas, Renz Valerio, Rhen Escano, Coleen Perez, Vince Velasco, Jinky Magan, Resee Tayag, Julia Chua, Makee Dulalia
20	"Rehas ng Pag-ibig"	Jennylyn Mercado, Alden Richards	Irene Villamor	Irene Villamor	May 23, 2015
Supporting Cast: Lui Manansala, Chariz Solomon, Diva Montelaba, Jhayvot Galang
21	"Paano na Ang Ating Anak?" (The Mark Anthony & Susan Bautista Story)	Camille Prats, Rafael Rosell	Bb. Joyce Bernal	Agnes Gagelonia-Uligan	May 30, 2015
Mark Anthony and Susan live a simple and happy life. Things changed when Susan was diagnosed with breast cancer. What's worst is that Mark Anthony also suffered nasopharyngeal cancer. Now that both of them had cancer, the big question is that what will happen to their only daughter if they would both die. Supporting Cast: Gerald Madrid, Ashley Cabrera
22	"Sex Slave: Anak Pinabayaan ng Ina?"	Alma Moreno, Wynwyn Marquez	Argel Joseph	Senedy Que	June 6, 2015
Supporting Cast: TJ Trinidad, Phytos Ramirez, Alfah Moreno, Mimi Juareza
23	"Hakbang Tungo sa Pangarap" (The Felix Emradura Story)	Kristofer Martin, Joyce Ching	Argel Joseph	Senedy Que	June 13, 2015
Poverty and sickness was not a hindrance to Felix in order to pursue his dreams. Abandoned by his father for another woman, he strived harder to study and for his family to live a better life. Supporting Cast: Jaclyn Jose, Phillip Salvador, Rich Asuncion, Mayton Eugenio, Karla Pambid, Nicole Dulalia, Lindsay De Vera, Josh Clement
24	"Tapat na Asawa, Baliw na Ina" (The Ompong & Vangie Pagunsan Story)	Paolo Contis, Ina Feleo	Laurice Guillen	Vienuel Ello	June 20, 2015
Supporting Cast: Ryza Cenon, Bryan Benedict, Carl Acosta, Marnie Lapuz
25	"Ang Bunga ng Nakaraan" (The Nestor Jasm Boller Story)	Aljur Abrenica, Sheena Halili	Albert Langitan	Senedy Que	June 27, 2015
Supporting Cast: Joko Diaz, Sharmaine Arnaiz, Shyr Valdez, Julian Trono, Lorenzo Mara, Julie Lee, Abel Estanislao, Vince Velasco, Jude de Jesus, Marco Antonio Chavez
26	"Brother Na, Sister Pa!" (The Tubato Family Story)	Irma Adlawan, John Arcilla, Mike Tan, Jeric Gonzales	Bb. Joyce Bernal	Michiko Yamamoto	July 4, 2015
Ricardo and Marilou live a unique life. It is because of their 13 children, 2 straight males, 2 straight females, a lesbian and 8 gays. Ricardo thinks that his 8 gay sons bring good luck and happiness, but Marilou thinks that they are a curse. Supporting Cast: Ervic Vijandre, Francine Garcia, Jerould Aceron, Nomer Limatog, Chrome Cosio, Jamil Ejhay Gonzalez, Lemuel Silvestre
27	"Preggy Prosti"	Kim Rodriguez, Derick Monasterio	Neal del Rosario	Rona Lean Sales	July 11, 2015
Supporting Cast: Sharmaine Suarez, Dex Quindoza, Elle Ramirez, Stephanie Sol, Vince Gamad, Aaron Yanga, Christian Ramirez
28	"Ang Huling Laro ng Aking Anak"	Miguel Tanfelix	Rico Gutierrez	Venjie Pellena	July 18, 2015
Supporting Cast: Ricky Davao, Eula Valdez, Pancho Magno, Buboy Villar, Jazz Ocampo, Geraldine Villamil, Vincent Magbanua
29	"Sabit-Sabit, Kabit-Kabit: Mga Pusong Malupit"	Alessandra de Rossi, Geoff Eigenmann	Argel Joseph	Senedy Que	July 25, 2015
Supporting Cast: LJ Reyes, Dominic Roco, Bing Davao, Rosemarie Sarita, Jude de Jesus
30	"Misis, Ipinagpalit sa Beki"	Sid Lucero, Rochelle Pangilinan	Ricky Davao	Senedy Que	August 1, 2015
Supporting Cast: Victor Basa, Susan Africa, Ken Alfonso
31	"My Teacher, My Rapist"	James Blanco, Bianca Umali	Neal del Rosario	Senedy Que	August 8, 2015
Supporting Cast: Al Tantay, Alma Concepcion, Bettina Carlos, Rich Asuncion, Diva Montelaba, Vince Velasco
32	"Ang Huling Yakap sa Nawalang Anak"	Elmo Magalona	Laurice Guillen	Maribel Ilag	August 15, 2015
Supporting Cast: Gina Alajar, Nonie Buencamino, Ash Ortega, Carl Acosta, Barbara Miguel, Elijah Alejo, Zymic Jaranilla, Johnny Regana, Stephanie Yamut, Erlinda Villalobos
33	"Ang Inang Hindi Ko Kadugo"	Phillip Salvador	Mark dela Cruz	Michiko Yamamoto	August 22, 2015
Supporting Cast: Zoren Legaspi, Yasmien Kurdi, Luz Valdez, Renz Valerio, JC Tiuseco, Archie Adamos, Sheila Marie Rodriguez, Chinggay Riego, Marife Necesito
34	"Katawan Ko, Bayaran Mo"	Paolo Contis, Rodjun Cruz	L.A. Madridejos	Michiko Yamamoto	August 29, 2015
Supporting Cast: Louise delos Reyes, Eunice Lagusad, Juancho Trivino, Mikoy Morales
35	"Ina Ko, Bugaw Ko"	Cherie Gil, Gabbi Garcia	Neal del Rosario	Senedy Que	September 5, 2015
A single mother Magda is selling jewelries to earn money for her children. However, when her items is mugged by the riding-in-tandem syndicate that leaves her jobless and got into debts, Magda has no choice but to sell the dignity of her daughter Pia to older men. Supporting Cast: Leo Martinez, Phytos Ramirez, Gilleth Sandico, Lindsay de Vera, Kenneth Paul Cruz, Sean Ross, Citadel Mariano, Mimi Juareza
36	"The Alden Richards Story"	Alden Richards	Gina Alajar	Suzette Doctolero & Jason Lim	September 12, 2015
Before becoming one of GMA Network's admired leading man, Richard Faulkerson Jr., a simple young man is pursued by his mother to enter showbiz because of his good looks. Their dreams shattered when Rosario was diagnosed with lung cancer and died. However, he didn't give up until he became known in the entertainment industry as Alden Richards. Note: Replay story on March 9, 2013. Supporting Cast: Mark Gil, Jackie Lou Blanco, Lui Manansala, Louise delos Reyes, Yssa Muhlach, Christian Ramirez, DJ Kara
37	"Ang Ganda na 'Di Nakikita" (The Paul John Presado Story)	Boobay	Mark dela Cruz	Jessie G. Villabrille	September 19, 2015
Supporting Cast: Michael De Mesa, Enzo Pineda, Shyr Valdez, Arny Ross, Elle Ramirez, Tess Bomb
38	"Husband for Sale"	Carla Abellana, Rafael Rosell, Katrina Halili	L.A. Madridejos	Senedy Que	September 26, 2015
Supporting Cast: Rey PJ Abellana, Rap Fernandez, Karla Pambid, Justin de Leon
39	"Ang Batang Isinilang sa Bilangguan" (The Paul Oliver Pili Story)	Sunshine Dizon	Louie Ignacio	Aloy Adlawan	October 3, 2015
Supporting Cast: TJ Trinidad, Liza Lorena, Miggs Cuaderno, Perla Bautista, Julian Trono, Mel Kimura, Andrew Schimmer, Jak Roberto, George Lim
40	"Anak ni Mister, Kabit ni Misis"	Ina Raymundo	L.A. Madridejos	Senedy Que	October 10, 2015
Supporting Cast: Joko Diaz, Jeric Gonzales, Sharmaine Suarez, Prince Villanueva, Ben Isaac, Bryan Olano
41	"Ang Sakripisyo ng Isang Ina" (The Nancy Cañares Story)	Nora Aunor	Maryo J. de los Reyes	Vienuel Ello	October 17, 2015
Supporting Cast: Ricky Davao, Diva Montelaba, Angeli Bayani, Chlaui Malayao, Rexcy Evert, Mannix Mannix, Cathy Remperas, Enrico Reyes, Roy Sotero
42	"My Mother is a Gambler"	Jean Garcia	Aya Topacio	Senedy Que	October 24, 2015
Supporting Cast: Roi Vinzon, Cris Villanueva, Ken Chan, Glenda Garcia, Che Ramos
43	"Ang Kapangyarihan ng Nuno sa Punso"	Raymart Santiago, Yasmien Kurdi	Michael de Mesa	Venjie Pellena	October 31, 2015
Supporting Cast: Hershey Garcia, Jude De Jesus, Kenneth Salva, Oscar Salva
44	"Don't Chat with Strangers"	Glydel Mercado	LA Madridejos	Jessie G. Villabrille	November 7, 2015
Rica Basco meet the stranger named Edgar Martinez, whom she first met on social media. Their relationship soon develops but when Edgar invites her to his house, he rapes her. The police rescues Rica and Edgar is arrested. Supporting Cast: Neil Ryan Sese, Kier Legaspi, Jazz Ocampo, Lou Sison, Ana Castro
45	"Ang Asawa Kong Aswang"	Andrea Torres, Benjamin Alves	Carlos Siguion-Reyna	Michiko Yamamoto	November 14, 2015
Supporting Cast: Eva Darren, Ana Feleo, Ervic Vijandre, Chinggay Riego, Tonio Quiazon, Raul Russo, Suzanne Izon
46	"Isang Mister, Lima Ang Misis"	Rochelle Pangilinan	Laurice Guillen	Vienuel Ello	November 21, 2015
Joseph marries Elaine but upon discovering that Joseph had already been married to another woman named Madel, Elaine divorces him. Joseph later reveals that he had married three other women. Supporting Cast: Jay Manalo, Ina Feleo, Wynwyn Marquez, Ana Capri, Will Ashley de Leon, Kyle Ocampo, Barbara Miguel, Stephanie Sol
47	"Una Siyang Naging Akin"	Glaiza de Castro, Dominic Roco, Boobay	Argel Joseph	Senedy Que	November 28, 2015
Supporting Cast: Mike Lloren, Zymic Jaranilla, Mimi Juareza, Sasha Baldoza, Banjo Romero, Christian Ramirez
48	"Binihag na Kasambahay"	Kim Rodriguez	L.A. Madridejos	Senedy Que	December 5, 2015
Supporting Cast: Nova Villa, TJ Trinidad, Cai Cortez, Coleen Perez, Richard Quan, Aira Bermudez, Karla Pambid, Andres Vasquez, Milkcah Wynne Nacion, Ar Angel Aviles, Stephanie Yamut
49	"Bingit ng Buhay" (The Skyway Bus Tragedy)	Chanda Romero, Pancho Magno, Jeric Gonzales	Neal del Rosario	Loi Argel Nova	December 12, 2015
The eldest among five children, Ryan (Jeric Gonzales), with his new job faces the dilemma of balancing his time on work, family and his girlfriend. On the other hand, Gilbert (Pancho Magno), a man directing his life to the wrong direction leaves his own family to live with his mistress. While Lita (Chanda Romero), a hardworking wife who's been working on a tailoring company for thirty years continues her daily routine in order to help his ailing husband. The lives of these three strangers change as they survive the nearly fatal 2013 Manila Skyway bus tragedy. Supporting Cast: Bing Davao, LJ Reyes, Joyce Ching, Queenly Rico, Marnie Lapus, Rexcy Evert, Elizabeth Samienta
50	"Paskong Malamig Ang Puso"	Alice Dixson	Joyce Bernal	Agnes Gagelonia-Uligan	December 19, 2015
She's beautiful, she's rich and she has a very successful career, but despite all these assets she has, Grace (Alice Dixson) remains single. Her dream of becoming a mother is shattered when she had myoma, a tumor that completely stripped off her chances of having a baby. Now considered as an old maid, Grace still continues her quest in finding the man destined to be her other half. Supporting Cast: Tessie Tomas, Sheila Marie Rodriguez, Samantha Lopez, Shelly Hipolito, Prince Villanueva, Jay Gonzaga, Ken Alfonso
51	"The Wally Bayola Story"	Wally Bayola	Ricky Davao	Marlon Miguel	December 26, 2015
Note: Replay story on February 9, 2013. Supporting Cast: Ara Mina, Irene Celebre, Arnold Reyes, Jessette Prospero, Boboy Garrovillo, Bing Davao, Tetay, Sef Cadayona, Yassi Pressman, Akeem Aldover, Sean Antoine

=== 2016 ===
No. in season	Title	Cast	Directed by	Written by	Original release date
1	"Tiyahin Ko, Karibal Ko"	Camille Prats, Jackie Rice	Maryo J. de los Reyes	Michiko Yamamoto	January 2, 2016
Milette (Jackie Rice) has always been jealous of her niece, Nina (Camille Prats), who is only two years younger than her. This jealousy intensifies when she realizes that the man she loves, Ricky (Polo Ravales), is attracted to Nina. Ricky then lives with them when Nina bears his child. This move helps Milette to become closer to Ricky, and not long afterward, the two entered a secret relationship. When Nina finds out about the relationship between the father of her child and her aunt, she immediately breaks up with Ricky while Milette returns to their province leaving Ricky alone. Supporting Cast: Polo Ravales, Lui Manansala, Lovely Rivero, Simon Ibarra, Rollie Inocencio, Orlando Sol, Pam Prinster, Pauline Mendoza, Robin Robell, Cristine Ng, Elijah Alejo, Tricia Raj Cabais
2	"Anak, Saan Kami Nagkamali?"	Ai-Ai Delas Alas, Snooky Serna	Joel Lamangan	Agnes G. Gagelonia-Uligan	January 9, 2016
Incapable of looking after her children, Mercy (Ai-Ai Delas Alas) decided to let her child, Shirlyn (Jhoana Marie Tan), be adopted by Lourdes (Snooky Serna) – her sister-in-law who's wanted to have a daughter. Lourdes takes Shirlyn and raises her as a daughter, making her adoption a secret from her. Shirlyn grows up believing that Lourdes is her real mother, so when she finds out the truth that she is an adopted child all along, her behavior changes and she starts to rebel against both of her mothers. Supporting Cast: Emilio Garcia, Allan Paule, Jhoana Marie Tan, Jak Roberto, Jim Pebanco, Bryan Benedict
3	"Kakambal Kong Ahas"	Dennis Trillo, Rhian Ramos	L.A. Madridejos	Aloy Adlawan	January 16, 2016
Michael and Lucas (both played by Dennis Trillo) are twins who grow up with opposite temperaments. While Michael is a virtuous person, his twin brother, Lucas, is known for being a bad boy. Michael finishes his schooling and marries a woman named Melissa (Rhian Ramos) while Lucas is an undergraduate and impregnates a girl in an early age. Living a futile life, Lucas tries to seek refuge with Michael. Wanting to help his twin, he let the man live with them only to find out that his twin brother is secretly using his identity to get to his wife and it's too late before Melissa realizes that she's making love not to Michael but to her husband's twin. Supporting Cast: Shamaine Buencamino, Toby Alejar, Rosemarie Sarita, Joseph Ison, Don Umali, Stanley Calderon, Staniel Calderon
4	"Dalawang Babae, Isang Anak"	Lovi Poe, Louise delos Reyes	Ricky Davao	Michiko Yamamoto	January 23, 2016
A product of a broken family, Jack (Lovi Poe) learns how to stand on her own feet at an early age. She is a butch lesbian who falls in love with Kat (Louise delos Reyes), a girl who is prone to sexual harassment. Jack promises Kat that she will protect her, but what she did not know is that she will experience the frightening role of a rape victim. Jack is sexually abused but she hides it from her lover. This tragic secret is only revealed when Jack's stomach started to swell, realizing that she is pregnant, bearing the child of her rapist. Supporting Cast: Gilleth Sandico, Juliene Mendoza, Paolo Rivero, Mike Magat, Dexter Quindoza, Gina Alajar
5	"Tamang Pag-ibig sa Maling Panahon" (The Maribel Montero Story)	Ruby Rodriguez, Derick Monasterio	Mark dela Cruz	Patrick Louie Ilagan	January 30, 2016
Maribel (Ruby Rodriguez) is a No Boyfriend Since Birth teacher, on the other hand, Nestor (Derick Monasterio) is a charming student. The two start their relationship as close friends, later this friendship turns into a romance. Thinking of what other people might say, due to their age gap and not to mention their student-teacher relationship, Maribel and Nestor hid their affair to the public. But no secret remains hidden forever and once their secret is revealed, their relationship starts to go downhill. Supporting Cast: Rich Asuncion, Divina Valencia, Archie Adamos, Tess Bomb, Geraldine Villamil, Aaron Yanga, Sanya Lopez
6	"Multo ni Ella"	Jeric Gonzales, Kyle Ocampo	Michael De Mesa	Michiko Yamamoto	February 6, 2016
He used to be an obedient son and a vigilant brother, but everything changes when Elmer (Jeric Gonzales) sexually assaults and kills Ella (Kyle Ocampo), his sister's playmate. Elmer believes that his secret will be buried forever along with Ella into her grave but it is not as simple as it seems. Elmer's life is suddenly disturbed by Ella's spirit until he, eventually, admits his crime to the authority. Supporting Cast: Yayo Aguila, Ar Angel Aviles, Mymy Davao, Johnny Regaña, Andrew Schimmer, Vince Gamad, Cholo Dela Cruz, Bryan Olano, James Robert
7	"When Love Becomes Obsession"	Andrea Torres	Conrado Peru	Senedy Que	February 13, 2016
Rhoda (Andrea Torres) and Emil (Mike Tan) are childhood friends, but when the two start a relationship, Rhoda's mother Mabel (Dexter Doria) is vocal that she is against their romance. Emil comes from a poor family and he doesn't have the resources to take care of Rhoda so when Wendel (Rafael Rosell), Rhoda's suitor proposes to her giving her mother the promise to clear all of her debts, Mabel didn't think twice and let her daughter marry Wendel. Rhoda had no choice but to forsake Emil. Emil resents Rhoda for her actions, eight years later he comes back and tries to ruin Rhoda and Wendel's family. Supporting Cast: Rafael Rosell, Mike Tan, Dexter Doria, Caloy Alde, Bebong Osorio, Janna Trias, Sue Prado, Abel Estanislao, Jojo Gallego, Lexter Capili, Zofia Edosma, Kendra Cabrera, Symon Delina, Ron Tomas
8	"I'm Dating a Transgender" (The Trixie Maristela Story)	Trixie Maristela, Martin del Rosario	Mark Dela Cruz	Jessie G. Villabrille	February 20, 2016
Trixie Maristela is known for winning the 2015 Miss International Queen, but her status of being transgender remains a secret from the parents of her boyfriend Art (Martin del Rosario). Trixie and Art immediately fall in love with each other when their paths cross in 2009. Art's parents are also fond of Trixie, who by that time thinks that she is a real woman. All of this changes when Trixie joins Eat Bulaga's Super Sireyna where her real identity is revealed to the whole nation. Art's parents had a hard time accepting Trixie but Art continues to prove the love knows no gender despite the fact that until now, people still can't accept the relationship they have. Supporting Cast: Jackie Lou Blanco, Mike Lloren, Lollie Mara, Frances Makil-Ignacio, Edwin Reyes, Carol Guanlao, Liezel Lopez, Christian Ramirez, Gold Aceron, Loydie Sarmiento, Miggy Onia
9	"The Rape Video Scandal"	Mark Herras, Thea Tolentino	L.A. Madridejos	Senedy Que	February 27, 2016
Ivy (Thea Tolentino) is the only child of Eloisa (Shamaine Buencamino) and Daniel (Gardo Versoza). For that reason, her parents' being overprotective of her is understandable. They have been very strict about Ivy entering in a relationship so when she meets Erik (Mark Herras) through social media, she keeps it a secret from both of her parents. Ivy and Erik share an interest in dancing and the two immediately click. Soon, Erik started to court Ivy but the latter is a bit hesitant. Because Erik is persistent in wooing Ivy, she finally accepts the young man as her boyfriend. Erik suddenly changes when he learns that Ivy is not into premarital sex. With a hidden agenda in mind, Erik tries to reconcile with Ivy. He intoxicates her with alcohol and he starts to rape her as he records the sexual assault. Supporting Cast: Gardo Versoza, Shamaine Buencamino, Mayton Eugenio, Jemwell Ventinilla, Miriam Al-alawi, Joemarie Nielsen, Joseph Reginaldo
10	"Ang Kriminal na Binuhay ng Diyos" (The Ricardo "Boy Bonus" Manlapaz Story)	Dingdong Dantes	Albert Langitan	Ping Medina	March 5, 2016
Boy Bonus (Dingdong Dantes) grows-up being bullied at school for having a prostitute mother. He then becomes a notorious criminal as a grown-up man, being one of the most wanted people in Bulacan. But his life faces a major change when he is shot and encounters a near-death experience. After being given a second chance to live, Boy Bonus leaves his old way of living and continues his life as a reverend, forever thankful for the second life God has given him. Supporting Cast: Joko Diaz, Rez Cortez, Carmi Martin, Bettina Carlos, Rap Fernandez, Carlo Gonzales, Shermaine Santiago, Joshen Bernardo, Justin de Leon
11	"Ina Kong Aswang"	Lotlot De Leon, Janine Gutierrez	Neal del Rosario	Michiko Yamamoto	March 12, 2016
Roda (Janine Gutierrez) is a simple girl with a simple life, but when she discovers that her mother is an aswang who kills innocent people for food, she is now torn between a dilemma of whom to follow – her mind that speaks for moral or her heart wanting to retain her mother. Supporting Cast: Victor Neri, Juancho Trivino, Luis Alandy, Kryshee Grengia, Stephanie Yamut, Ermie Concepcion, Dan Alvaro, Mario Capalad
12	"BFF Kong Dwende"	Jean Garcia	Neal del Rosario	Jason Lim	March 19, 2016
Badet (Chlaui Malayao) is only eight years old when she befriends a white dwarf named Nando (Geoff Eigenmann). The two become close friends. Instead of playing with other kids, Badet chooses to play with Nando, and in return, Nando helps Badet with her school quizzes and the safety of her family. Nando wants Badet to keep their friendship secret from her parents, but when Badet was caught by her father talking with Nando, she had no choice but to tell the truth and to face the consequences of this action. Supporting Cast: Geoff Eigenmann, Neil Ryan Sese, Chlaui Malayao
13	"Bagong Pag-asa ni Lola"	Gloria Romero	Argel Joseph	Loi Argel Nova	April 2, 2016
Living alone in the province of Pangasinan with only her farm animals, Lola Minang (Gloria Romero) had her simple life intact until the day when Duday (Lindsay De Vera), the daughter of her son, came into her life. Even though she's scared that she is maybe too old to take care of a baby, Minang tries everything to raise Duday properly – even enrolling in elementary school just to help her granddaughter with her studies. From being a no-read-no-write guardian, Minang continues her education until high school despite her children being against the idea. Supporting Cast: Tina Paner, Tina Monasterio, Lindsay De Vera, Makee Dulalia, Tonio Quiazon, Paolo Rivero, Geraldine Villamil, Giovanni Baldisseri
14	"Ang Lihim ni Rovie"	LJ Reyes, Benjamin Alves	Neal del Rosario	Vienuel Ello	April 9, 2016
Rovie (LJ Reyes) is one of those people who has a dark past. In order to continue the life that she's been dreaming of, a simple life with the man she loves and children who strengthens her, she puts this past behind. But in the midst of her quiet life, Rovie needs to face a revelation when her husband finds out that she's been a rape victim of three different man, one of them her own father. Supporting Cast: Michael De Mesa, Roi Vinzon, Irma Adlawan, Diva Montelaba, Elijah Alejo, Pauline Mendoza, Chiqui Del Carmen, Vic Romano, Masa Mentuda
15	"My Missing Carrot Man" (The Tyson Destor Story)	Elyson De Dios	Michael de Mesa	Loi Argel Nova	April 16, 2016
It was in December 2014 when Marivic (Angel Aquino) wakes up one morning and realizes that his son, Tyson (Elyson De Dios), is missing. Tyson is a child with a non-verbal autism spectrum disorder who wanders from their home, Angeles to Mabalacat, Pampanga. Marivic finally finds Tyson through the help of social media when his son goes viral on Facebook due to his looks resembling Jeyrick Sigmaton, a social media sensation known as the "Carrot Man". Supporting Cast: Angel Aquino, Lawrence Pineda, Enzo Pineda, Renz Valerio, Nicole Dulalia, Milkcah Wynne Nacion
16	"Zumba Dancing Boy: Balang" (The John Philip Bughaw Story)	John Philip Bughaw	Real Florido	Jessie G. Villabrille	April 23, 2016
It's a blessing for every family to have a child. Especially when it is growing up healthy and lively. Often the fondness of parents for their young healthy children leads them to take photos or videos of them to show off and make them proud. One was the young Balang (John Philip Bughaw), a healthy and cute kid today who once dreamed of being famous and with the help of modern technology called "social media", millions upon millions had watched his videos which open him the road to stardom. He was even invited for road shows abroad and achieved the fame he has today. Supporting Cast: Manilyn Reynes, Ryan Eigenmann, Susan Africa, Klea Pineda, Divine Aucina
17	"Mahal Kita, Mahal Ko Siya"	Kris Bernal	Michael de Mesa	Senedy Que	April 30, 2016
Supporting Cast: Gabby Eigenmann, Dominic Roco, Dexter Doria, Bryan Benedict, Ashley Cabrera
18	"My Little Wife"	Josephine Berry	L.A. Madridejos	Michiko Yamamoto	May 7, 2016
Supporting Cast: Jay Manalo, Hiro Peralta, Shyr Valdez, Debraliz, Marnie Lapus, Elle Ramirez, Nikki Co, Analyn Barro, Prince Clemente, Isabel Teotico
19	"Ang Gayuma Ng Pag-Ibig"	Jennylyn Mercado, Jerald Napoles	Bb. Joyce Bernal	Michiko Yamamoto	May 14, 2016
Supporting Cast: Rafa Siguion-Reyna, Sancho Delas Alas, Lance Serrano, Maritess Joaquin, Claire Vance, Erlinda Villalobos, Rolando Inocencio, Mach Duran, Richard Manabat
20	"Sakripisyo ng Isang Ina"	Gina Alajar, Kiko Estrada	Paul Sta. Ana	Loi Argel Nova	May 21, 2016
As a single parent, Zeny (Gina Alajar) has always been brave in facing the dilemmas of daily life in order to support and take good care of her son's education. On the other hand, Lando (Kiko Estrada) is known to be kind and respectful, he is an obedient son to Zeny despite him being the center of bullying at school for not having a father. When Lando learns her mother's secret about his father, he started to revolt against Zeny. Lando then meets Sky (Paolo Contis) who introduces him into a gang which leads Lando into becoming a juvenile delinquent, a life that is far different to the simple life he used to have. Supporting Cast: Paolo Contis, Gigi Locsin, Jay Arcilla, Kenneth Salva, Gil Wagas Jr.
21	"Crime of Passion"	Max Collins	Maryo J. de los Reyes	Agnes G. Gagelonia-Uligan	May 28, 2016
Malen (Max Collins) is one of those millions of battered women who experience abuse from their partners. She suffers not only physical and mental abuses but also sexual maltreatment from her husband, Eric (Mark Anthony Fernandez), a soldier. Thinking that her husband might change someday, Malen endures this violence but Eric never returned to his old angelic personality instead, his cruel behavior heightens until Malen decided to do right thing and fights for her right as a woman. Supporting Cast: Mark Anthony Fernandez, Mike Lloren, Cheska Iñigo, Cathy Remperas, She Maala, Beatriz Imperial, Roy Sotero, Xyruz Cruz, Nico Cordova, Leanne Bautista, Jude de Jesus
22	"Pikot in Love"	Jeric Gonzales, Klea Pineda	Jorron Lee Monroy	Vienuel Ello	June 4, 2016
Allan (Jeric Gonzales) just attended a festival at his peer club's province when he recognized Malou (Klea Pineda). At first, the two were not sympathetic to each other but afterwards, they had each others' hearts. Until the day came that Allan intended to kiss Malou inside her room. But unfortunately, Malou's father came in with a bolo on his hand. They seemed wonderstruck and did not know what to do. Due to panic, Allan planned to return to Manila but was prevented by Malou's father. He says they need to get married first before Allan returned home to Manila. Because of Allan's unrestrained fear, he has nothing to do but to agree. Allan's parents liked Malou because of its kind and caring side. As known, Allan is a chickboy. She has many girlfriends in their town. Malou displeased with Allan till her womb bled. Malou has immediately rushed to the hospital. Supporting Cast: Bobby Andrews, Mickey Ferriols, Ollie Espino, Miggy Jimenez, Arjan Jimenez, Analyn Barro, Arra San Agustin, Bobby Angeles
23	"Higanti ng Barang"	Yasmien Kurdi, Rafael Rosell	Maryo J. de los Reyes	Michiko Yamamoto	June 11, 2016
Supporting Cast: Bettina Carlos, Maricris Garcia, Prince Vinluan, Angie Ferro, Rouel De Villa
24	"Mag-ama sa Loob ng Bilangguan"	John Arcilla, Kristofer Martin	Neal del Rosario	Senedy Que	June 18, 2016
Supporting Cast: Glenda Garcia, Jess Lapid Jr., Vince Gamad, Kevin Sagra, Christian Ramirez, Bryce Eusebio, Julius Erasga, VMiguel Gonzales
25	"Ang Real Carrot Man" (The Jeyrick Sigmaton Story)	Jake Vargas, Jeyrick Sigmaton	Neal del Rosario	Loi Argel Nova	June 25, 2016
It is the story about Jeyrick who wants to work on a carrot farm with his friend. Despite the struggles, he won't stop, and one day he became an internet sensation and was interviewed. He appeared sometimes like bubble gang and become a product endorser. Supporting Cast: Epy Quizon, Lou Veloso, Tess Antonio, Faith da Silva, Tess Bomb, Lharby Policarpio, Jacob Vargas, Ana Castro, Loydie Sarmiento, Sachi Manahan
26	"Maid for Each Other"	Katrina Halili	Gina Alajar	Senedy Que	July 2, 2016
Supporting Cast: Dion Ignacio, Wynwyn Marquez, Lui Manansala
27	"Gay Organ Donor" (The Genesis Laviana Story)	Roderick Paulate	Joel Lamangan	Michiko Yamamoto	July 9, 2016
Supporting Cast: Ces Quesada, Mel Martinez, Archie Adamos, Renz Fernandez, Shermaine Santiago, Jim Pebanco, Eunice Lagusad, Bryan Olano, Hannah Precillas, Aaron Yanga, Princess Guevarra, Sean Ross
28	"Ang Asawa Kong Aswang"	Andrea Torres, Benjamin Alves	Carlos Siguion-Reyna	Michiko Yamamoto	July 16, 2016
Note: Replay story on November 14, 2015. Supporting Cast: Eva Darren, Ana Feleo, Ervic Vijandre, Chinggay Riego, Tonio Quiazon, Raul Russo, Suzanne Izon
29	"The Abused Boy"	Miggs Cuaderno	Conrado Peru	Senedy Que	July 23, 2016
A young boy, named Makmak ran away from home after his family had an altercation. He soon meets a stranger who seems friendly at first, promising him a better life, but the stranger, revealed to be a pedophile, sexually assaults him when they go to a secluded forest. Makmak tries to escape by first, fleeing after a toilet break but fails when the stranger catches him and he was brought far away from his home. In the house of the stranger, on bedtime, The stranger's son, felt uncomfortable upon looking at his father wrapping himself around Makmak. the next day. Makmak tries to bash the sleeping stranger's head with a concrete block but failed. The boy's family, who have realized their wrongs, have reunited and felt worried about their boy's whereabouts, having been missing for days. On a bus going elsewhere, the stranger fell asleep and Makmak had a chance to escape when he found a group of police. The stranger wakes up and finds out that he is gone, he leaves the bus with his son to try to get Makmak back, only to find him with the police. The policemen then chase and arrest the stranger. It is successful, and Makmak happily reunites with his family afterwards. Supporting Cast: Sunshine Dizon, Gabby Eigenmann, Leandro Baldemor, Julia Joan Chua, Jhiz Deocareza
30	"Nang Mawala Ang Lahat"	Carla Abellana	Bb. Joyce Bernal	Michiko Yamamoto	July 30, 2016
Supporting Cast: Rita Avila, Rey PJ Abellana, TJ Trinidad, Alma Concepcion, Ashley Ortega, Avery Paraiso, Pauline Mendoza, Yasser Marta, Menggie Cobarrubias, Rosanna Iringan, Abby Asistio, Koreen Medina, Franchesca Salcedo, Toby Santillan, Dave Bornea
31	"Pinaghiwalay, Pinagtagpo ng Tadhana"	Kris Bernal	Gina Alajar	Rhoda Sulit-Mariano	August 6, 2016
Supporting Cast: Snooky Serna, Julio Diaz, Kier Legaspi, Sue Prado, Dennis Coronel, Jay Gonzaga, Zofia Quinit, Yutaka Yamakawa, Mimi Juareza, Ate Reg
32	"Sa Kabila ng Lahat, Ikaw Pa Rin"	Sheena Halili	Neal del Rosario	Senedy Que	August 13, 2016
Supporting Cast: Glydel Mercado, Rodjun Cruz, Phytos Ramirez, Bryan Benedict, Arianne Bautista, Mara Alberto, Dan Alvaro, Cathy Remperas
33	"Hula ng Kamatayan"	Chynna Ortaleza	Rechie del Carmen	Vienuel Ello	August 20, 2016
Supporting Cast: Chanda Romero, Dante Rivero, Ken Chan, Shyr Valdez, Paolo Paraiso, Tess Bomb, Lotlot Bustamante, Rosemarie Sarita, Rhen Escano, James Teng
34	"Fight for Love" (The Buboy Villar and Angillyn Gorens Love Story)	Buboy Villar, Angillyn Gorens	Bb. Joyce Bernal	Honey Hidalgo	August 27, 2016
Supporting Cast: Elizabeth Oropesa, Gino Padilla, Cheska Diaz, Jan Manual, Renz Valerio, Annicka Dolonius, Kai Atienza, Kurt Kendrick, Thea Tolentino, Carlo Cannu, Mach Duran
35	"The Rape of Rosie"	Jhoana Marie Tan	Rechie del Carmen	Loi Argel Nova	September 3, 2016
Supporting Cast: Cris Villanueva, Allan Paule, Yayo Aguila, Eva Darren, Sheila Marie Rodriguez, Elle Ramirez, Barbara Miguel, Kim Belles, Dex Quindoza, Suzanne Ison, Tonio Quiazon
36	"Ang Lolo Kong Prosti"	Emilio Garcia	Joel Lamangan	Senedy Que	September 10, 2016
Supporting Cast: Jenine Desiderio, Lucho Ayala, Richard Quan, Mike Magat, Jade Lopez, Lharby Policarpio, Mariam Al-alawi, Vince Gamad, Rob Moya, Afi Africa, Rob Sy, Beauty Veloso, Fonz Desa, Paolo Rivero, Buddy Palad, Miko Cruz
37	"The Wowowin Grand Winner" (The Rexy Soliman and Shayne Jones Story)	Sanya Lopez	Rico Gutierrez	Loi Argel Nova	September 17, 2016
Supporting Cast: Candy Pangilinan, Rich Asuncion, Diva Montelaba, Geraldine Villamil, Joemarie Nielsen, Beatriz Imperial, Michelle Bea Paloma, Travis Kraft
38	"Anak sa Mundo ng Droga"	Barbie Forteza	Albert Langitan	Honey Hidalgo	September 24, 2016
Supporting Cast: Jackie Lou Blanco, Joko Diaz, Martin del Rosario, Tina Paner, Mona Louise Rey, Ar Angel Aviles, Joseph Izon, Ollie Espino
39	"Lost Phone, Love Found"	Kristofer Martin, Joyce Ching	Rechie del Carmen	Agnes G. Gagelonia-Uligan	October 1, 2016
Supporting Cast: Ina Feleo, Juancho Trivino, Maricris Garcia, Pekto
40	"Ang Kapangyarihan ng Nuno sa Punso"	Raymart Santiago, Yasmien Kurdi	Michael de Mesa	Venjie Pellena	October 8, 2016
Note: Replay story on October 31, 2015. Supporting Cast: Hershey Garcia, Jude de Jesus, Kenneth Salva, Oscar Salva
41	"You and Me Against the World"	Kim Rodriguez, Hiro Peralta	Irene Villamor	Senedy Que	October 15, 2016
Supporting Cast: Roi Vinzon, Ryan Eigenmann, Irma Adlawan, Bryan Benedict, Ervic Vijandre, Kenneth Paul Cruz
42	"Trending: Ang Babae sa Bus"	Divine Aucina	LA Madridejos	Loi Argel Nova	October 22, 2016
Supporting Cast: Gardo Versoza, Joshua Dionisio, Sue Prado, Stephanie Sol, Arny Ross, Sancho Delas Alas, Pauline Mendoza
43	"Ang Anak kong Tiyanak"	Mike Tan	Lore Reyes	Vienuel Ello	October 29, 2016
Supporting Cast: Boy 2 Quizon, Lauren Young, Vaness del Moral, Crispin Pineda, Glenda Garcia, Lovely Rivero, Sharmaine Suarez, Gerald Madrid, Kiel Rodriguez
44	"Ang Sundalong Magiting"	Pancho Magno, Max Collins	Ricky Davao	Senedy Que	November 5, 2016
Supporting Cast: Jestoni Alarcon, Nanette Inventor, Mymy Davao, Phytos Ramirez, David Licauco
45	"Finding Earl" (The Doliente Family Story)	Gabby Concepcion, Snooky Serna	Bb. Joyce Bernal	Agnes G. Gagelonia-Uligan	November 12, 2016
Laurie (Snooky Serna) and Ernest Doliente (Gabby Concepcion) lived a happy life. However, things changed when their son Earl, who was only 2 years old disappeared without a trace. After 2 decades, Laurie was diagnosed with lung cancer, and her dying wish is for Earl to be found. Supporting Cast: Kate Valdez, Kyle Ocampo, Leanne Bautista, Prince Villanueva, Jude de Jesus, Carl Cervantes, Euwenn Mikael Aleta
46	"The Happy and Sad Adventures of Tekla" (The Romeo Librada Story)	Jerald Napoles	Bb. Joyce Bernal	Senedy Que	November 19, 2016
Supporting Cast: Chynna Ortaleza, Jong Cuenco, Lou Veloso, Geraldine Villamil, Orlandol Sol, Aaron Yanga, Chinggay Riego, Donita Nose, John Fontanilla, Mimi Juareza, Khulafu, Giggle
47	"Kadugo, Kaaway, Kakampi"	Dion Ignacio, Derrick Monasterio	L.A. Madridejos	Michiko Yamamoto	November 26, 2016
Two brothers Raymond and Randy were always compared to each other when they were young. Their parents frequently reprimand Raymond for his laziness while supporting Randy for being hardworking. As they grow up, however, Raymond becomes rebellious and his jealousy leads him to frequently attack Randy. Supporting Cast: Isay Alvarez, Richard Quan, Mel Kimura, Lindsay de Vera, Jay Arcilla, Brent Valdez, Dentrix Ponce, Julius Erasga
48	"Ang Hinagpis ng Isang Ina" (The Lorelei Go Story)	Glydel Mercado	Gina Alajar	Dang Sulit	December 3, 2016
Lorelei (Glydel Mercado) who has not yet recovered from the death of her eldest son Rowden (RJ Padilla), due to liver cancer, faced another struggle when Hasset (Benjamin Alves), a celebrity chef who is popularly known as the "Sweets Master" was diagnosed with that same illness and died. Now, her youngest and only surviving son Hisham (Jeric Gonzales) was diagnosed with cirrhosis of the liver. Supporting Cast: Benjamin Alves, Jeric Gonzales, RJ Padilla, Catherine Remperas, Shyr Valdez, Dex Quindoza
49	"Davao Bombing: Mga Kwento ng Pag-asa (Part 1)"	Chanda Romero, Victor Neri, Sherilyn Reyes, Joross Gamboa, Diva Montelaba, April Gustilo, Ken Alfonso, Sinon "Rogelia" Loresca Jr., Dea Formilleza	Albert Langitan	Senedy Que	December 10, 2016
A special episode about the 2016 Davao City bombing shot entirely along Roxas Avenue, Davao City, the site of the explosion that occurred on September 2, 2016 that killed 15 people and injured many others. The first part chronicles the lives of those victims before the explosion. Supporting Cast: Cathy Tan, Kerby Nuevo, Gemma Dupaya, Anton Sep Yuteon, Carlo Medel, Irwin Noriega, Aexben Trillo, Eladio Fernando
50	"Davao Bombing: Mga Kwento ng Pag-asa (Part 2)"	Chanda Romero, Victor Neri, Sherilyn Reyes, Joross Gamboa, Diva Montelaba, April Gustilo, Ken Alfonso, Sinon "Rogelia" Loresca Jr., Dea Formilleza	Albert Langitan	Senedy Que	December 17, 2016
A second of the two-part special episode about the 2016 Davao City bombing that features the events during and after the explosion. Supporting Cast: Cathy Tan, Kerby Nuevo, Gemma Dupaya, Anton Sep Yuteon, Carlo Medel, Irwin Noriega, Aexben Trillo, Eladio Fernando
51	"May Forever sa Bahay Pag-Ibig" (The Jessie Tano and Suarez Love Story)	Luz Valdez, Leo Martinez	Neal del Rosario	Renato Custodio Jr.	December 24, 2016
Supporting Cast: Perla Bautista, Bodjie Pascua, Thea Tolentino, Lucho Ayala, Dianne Medina, James Teng

=== 2017 ===
No. in season	Title	Cast	Directed by	Written by	Original release date
1	"Losing Jeffrey, Finding Jayson" (The Jayson Tomas Story)	Jaclyn Jose, Rocco Nacino	Neal del Rosario	Senedy Que	January 7, 2017
Supporting Cast: Ynez Veneracion, Angeli Bayani, Gigi Locsin, Rosemarie Sarita, Ermie Concepcion, Beatriz Imperial, Suzanne Ison, Liezel Lopez
2	"Justice for the Battered Child" (The Linda Cagalitan Story)	Diana Zubiri	Rechie del Carmen	Senedy Que	January 14, 2017
Linda decided to work abroad for her family. She left her 2-year-old son to her cousin. However, the child would suffer cruelty. What's worse is when the boy was scourged with a belt that lead to his death. Supporting Cast: Rich Asuncion, Shermaine Santiago, Renz Valerio, Elijah Alejo, Phytos Ramirez, Kiel Rodriguez, Ana Castro, Vince Gamad, Joseph Ison, Jason Brix, Euwenn Mikael Aleta
3	"Ang Sakripisyo ng Anak" (The Ramon Burce Story)	Christian Bables	Maryo J. de los Reyes	Honey Hidalgo	January 21, 2017
Supporting Cast: Gina Alajar, Allan Paule, Faith Da Silva, Zymic Jaranilla, Catherine Remperas, Kevin Sagra, Roy Sotero, Avid Razul, Mon Marasigan
4	"Pag-ibig sa Likod ng Kababalaghan" (The Chito and Daisy Mercader Story)	Irma Adlawan, John Arcilla	Lore Reyes	Rodney Junio	January 28, 2017
Supporting Cast: Stephanie Sol, Teri Malvar, Lovely Rivero, Aaron Yanga, Kyle Ocampo, Milkcah Wynne Nacion, Jhiz Deocareza, Renerich Ocon
5	"Ang Batang Binihag ng Kulto"	Dante Rivero	Rechie del Carmen	Vienuel Ello	February 4, 2017
Supporting Cast: Pen Medina, Ces Quesada, Dexter Doria, Ervic Vijandre, Miggs Cuaderno, Mara Alberto, Ralph Noriega, Lovely Abella
6	"Sweet Smell of Success" (The Donita Nose Story)	Donita Nose	Mark Dela Cruz	Senedy Que	February 11, 2017
Supporting Cast: Tina Paner, Cris Villanueva, Jeric Gonzales, Marc Justine Alvarez, Sancho Delas Alas, Gilleth Sandico, Kim Chi Tee, Arkel Mendoza, Mega Unciano
7	"Viral Siblings" (The Bilog and Bunak Tiongson Story)	Leanne Bautista, Kenken Nuyad	Rechie del Carmen	Senedy Que	February 18, 2017
Two siblings are share a funny viral video in the internet just to let their dad go back to the family. Supporting Cast: Lotlot de Leon, Gardo Versoza, Barbara Miguel, Karla Pambid, Banjo Romero
8	"Love Knows No Age" (The Mitch Tandingan and Gil Moreno Story)	Ashley Ortega, Kenneth Medrano	Neal del Rosario	Honey Hidalgo	February 25, 2017
Supporting Cast: Sherilyn Reyes, Shyr Valdez, Elyson De Dios, Dea Formilleza
9	"Ang Rampa ng Buhay Ko" (The Sinon Loresca, Jr. Story)	Sinon Loresca	Mark dela Cruz	Senedy Que	March 4, 2017
Sinon suffered cruelty by his parents because of his homosexuality. But, he managed to run away in order for him to earn a living. But, he would be a viral sensation and later be known as "Rogelia". Supporting Cast: Joko Diaz, Sharmaine Arnaiz, Chynna Ortaleza, Mikoy Morales, Klea Pineda, Jemwell Ventinilla, Caprice Cayetano, Rob Sy, Chrome Cosio, Jonathan Wagner, Carlo Cannu
10	"Ang Munting Bayani" (The Little Boy Edmund John Nipay Story)	Boots Anson-Roa	Rechie del Carmen	Loi Argel Nova	March 11, 2017
A three-year-old named Edmund john saved his disabled grandmother from a fire. Supporting Cast: Nick Lizaso, Mickey Ferriols, TJ Trinidad, Euwenn Mikael Aleta
11	"Abot Kamay Ang Pangarap" (The Erwin Dayrit Story)	Erwin Dayrit	Gil Tejada Jr.	Patrick Ilagan	March 18, 2017
Erwin suffered from Osteogenesis imperfectia, a rare bone disease. He found love in the person of Helen, a beautiful young student. However, she didn't give Erwin a chance to prove his feelings for her. So Erwin decided to ease his pain by painting. Supporting Cast: Gary Estrada, Ana Capri, Aicelle Santos, Jazz Ocampo, David Remo, Rob Moya, Liezel Lopez, Sofia Pablo, Lance Serrano
12	"Mag-inang Biktima"	Yasmien Kurdi	Gil Tejada Jr.	Anna Aleta Nadela	March 25, 2017
Supporting Cast: Jackie Lou Blanco, Kier Legaspi, Marco Alcaraz, Arthur Solinap, Lou Veloso, Mel Kimura, Elijah Alejo, Froilan Sales, Nicole Dulalia, Chinggay Riego, Jayzelle Suan
13	"Ang Best Friend Kong Aso" (The Eddieboy Redoloza and Black Jack Story)	John Arcilla, Snooky Serna	Don Michael Perez	Honey Hidalgo	April 1, 2017
Supporting Cast: Will Ashley, Juancho Trivino, Jacob Briz, Eddieboy Redoloza, Blackjack
14	"Love is Complicated" (The Edgar Mendoza Story)	Mark Herras, Wynwyn Marquez, Kris Bernal	Maryo J. de los Reyes	Senedy Que	April 8, 2017
Supporting Cast: Yul Servo, Allan Paule, Lynn Cruz, Bryce Eusebio, Nicole Donesa, Jude De Jesus
15	"Hanggang Sa Iyong Paggising, Daddy" (The Aguilar Family Story)	Rafael Rosell, Jackie Rice, Caprice Cayetano	Maryo J. de los Reyes	Maria Zita S. Garganera	April 22, 2017
James, a dedicated nurse, husband to Joanne and a father to Julia. But, on his birthday, he suffered comatose. His daughter who was only 5 years old wishes for her father to recover. Supporting Cast: Lui Manansala, Crispin Pineda, Raquel Monteza, Angela Evangelista, Marika Sasaki
16	"Drug Mule sa China" (Ang Inang Biktima ng Sindikato)	Diana Zubiri	Gina Alajar	Senedy Que	April 29, 2017
The story of Sally Ordinario-Villanueva (Diana Zubiri), one of the three Filipinos alongside Ramon Credo and Elizabeth Batain, convicted and sentenced to death for drug trafficking and was executed in China on March 30, 2011. When her husband became a victim of illegal recruiter, Sally decided to work abroad. But, she would become a victim of a syndicate of drugs. Supporting Cast: Ryan Eigenmann, Tanya Gomez, Bing Davao, Mymy Davao, Ralph Noriega, Dentrix Ponce, Ar Angel Aviles
17	"Imaginary Friend"	Gabby Eigenmann, Angelika dela Cruz	Gil Tejada Jr.	Loi Argel Nova	May 6, 2017
Supporting Cast: Rolly Inocencio, Rosemarie Sarita, Kiel Rodriguez, Antonette Garcia, Ces Aldaba, Citadel Mariano, Jude De Jesus, Yuan Francisco
18	"Laglag Bata: Ang Ina Kong Abortionista"	Lotlot de Leon, Janine Gutierrez	Gina Alajar	Glaiza Ramirez	May 13, 2017
Supporting Cast: Neil Ryan Sese, Aaron Yanga, Analyn Barro, Alyssa Del Real, Joemarie Nielsen, Tricia Cabais, Dayara Shane
19	"Fat and Furious: The Adventures of Boobsie" (The Mary Jane Arrabis Vallero Story)	Boobsie	Rechie del Carmen	Senedy Que	May 20, 2017
Supporting Cast: Jay Manalo, Elizabeth Oropesa, Jhoana Marie Tan, Cai Cortez, Prince Clemente, Jong Cuenco, Kenken Nuyad, Makee Dulalia, Tonette Gulao
20	"The Healing Touch of Love" (The Noriel Bañes Story)	Martin del Rosario, Ryza Cenon	Neal del Rosario	Vienuel Ello	May 27, 2017
Supporting Cast: Rey PJ Abellana, Renz Fernandez, Kevin Santos, James Teng, Vaness del Moral, Lharby Policarpio, Princess Guevarra
21	"Beauty in Your Eyes" (The Jinky "Madam Kilay" Anderson Story)	Jinky "Madam Kilay" Anderson	Mark dela Cruz	Senedy Que	June 3, 2017
Jinky Anderson suffered many obstacles in her life. She decided to work in South Korea to provide a better life for her children. There she would meet Paul Anderson (Gov Lloyd) who would later be her husband called "Afam". Her luck changed because of her so-called "Kilay Tutorials" in social media, that she would later be called as "Madam Kilay". Supporting Cast: Ces Quesada, Rich Asuncion, Barbara Miguel, Gov Lloyd, Miggy Jimenez, Brent Valdez, Kyle Guevarra
22	"The Happy and Sad Adventures of Tekla" (The Romeo Librada Story)	Jerald Napoles	Bb. Joyce Bernal	Senedy Que	June 10, 2017
Note: Replay story on November 19, 2016. Supporting Cast Chynna Ortaleza, Jong Cuenco, Lou Veloso, Geraldine Villamil, Orlando Sol, Aaron Yanga, Chinggay Riego, Donita Nose, John Fontanilla, Mimi Juareza, Khulafu, Giggle
23	"My Breastfeeding Dad" (The Anton Ramos Story)	Diether Ocampo; Megan Young	Neal Del Rosario	Jules Katanyag	June 17, 2017
Anton Ramos (Diether Ocampo) and his wife Sel (Megan Young) live a normal and peaceful life. After giving birth to their first child, Sel survived breast cancer. During her second pregnancy, she decided to breastfeed her child when she gave birth. However, Sel died after giving birth to their second child. Now, Anton is devastated because his wife's plan to breastfeed will never happen. Supporting Cast: Menggie Cobarrubias, Shermaine Santiago, Rafa Siguion-Reyna, Faith Da Silva, Dentrix Ponce, Dave Bornea, Janna Trias, Marie Kristine De Leon
24	"May Forever" (The Ariel Cruz and Julieta Manuel Story)	Gabby Concepcion, Janice de Belen	Gina Alajar	Agnes G. Gagelonia-Uligan	June 24, 2017
Supporting Cast: Inah De Belen, Jeric Gonzales, Thea Tolentino, Bruno Gabriel, Lovely Rivero, Elle Ramirez, Simon Ibarra, Dea Formilleza
25	"Pinay in the Happiest Place on Earth" (The Lucy Navarrete Valenzuela Story)	Rochelle Pangilinan, Arthur Solinap	Gil Tejada Jr.	Glaiza Ramirez	July 1, 2017
Supporting Cast: Mike Lloren, Glenda Garcia, Mikee Quintos, Kate Valdez, Althea Ablan, Pia Padilla, Nar Cabico, Gui Adorno
26	"Reyna ng Tubig" (The Jay Kummer "Dodoy" Teberio Story)	Super Tekla, Kenneth Medrano	Mark dela Cruz	Jessie G. Villabrille	July 8, 2017
An episode shot entirely in Cebu, Dodoy (Super Tekla) is a happy positive-minded student. Little did he know that he is gay and his family already knew about his true identity. In order to earn for his studies, he sells water along the streets of Cebu. Supporting Cast: Nanette Inventor, Stephanie Sol, Afi Africa, Marlon Hofer, Albert Vestil, Clare Sanchez, Eviane Soriano
27	"Sa Likod ng Sexy Image" (The Kim Domingo Story)	Kim Domingo	Adolf Alix Jr.	Jessie G. Villabrille	July 15, 2017
Supporting Cast: Snooky Serna, Tessie Tomas, Juancho Trivino, Arny Ross, Geleen Eugenio
28	"Our Viral Love" (The Lance Fernandez and Ella Layar Story)	Ken Chan, Ayra Mariano	Albert Langitan	Vienuel Ello	July 22, 2017
Ella (Ayra Mariano) is a person with disability, who rides in a wheelchair whenever she goes to the school everyday. Believing that her condition is a hindrance to find her one true love, this mindset went to a halt when she met Lance (Ken Chan), who would later on fight for his love no matter what challenges hurdle their relationship. Supporting Cast: Sherilyn Reyes, Emilio Garcia, Lollie Mara, Camille Canlas, Yasser Marta, Karlo Duterte, Ayeesha Cervantes
29	"Small and Lovable" (The Juvy, Joel and Angie Macahilig Story)	Jean Garcia, Ricky Davao	Rechie del Carmen	Loi Argel Nova	July 29, 2017
Erlinda's (Jean Garcia) mother (Odette Khan) has always disapproved of her relationship with Mario (Ricky Davao), whom she bears a child with even if they're third-degree cousins. As soon as Erlinda gave birth to them, the children turned out to be little people and suffer from a condition called 'dwarfism.' Until their luck changed when they became winners of Juan For All, All For Juan segment of Eat Bulaga Supporting Cast: Odette Khan, Kevin Santos, Rap Fernandez, Tintin Ng, Martin Apolinar, Mhean Crisostomo
30	"OFW Homeless in Hong Kong" (The Mildred Perez Story)	Janice de Belen	Gil Tejada Jr.	Suzette Doctolero & Jason John S. Lim	August 5, 2017
Hailing from the province of Nueva Vizcaya, Mildred (Janice de Belen) was living a simple life with her husband Ed (Cris Villanueva); together, they farm for their living. Everything turned out just fine for them until Mildred decided to work abroad as an OFW in order to sustain their family's needs, especially for her kids who are starting to grow up. How far can her sacrifices go just to provide a better life for her family, despite experiencing abuse? Supporting Cast: Cris Villanueva, Caprice Cayetano, MJ Jacobo, Rosie Talimongan, Jordan Hong
31	"Ang Makulay na Buhay ni Boobay" (The Norman Balbuena Story)	Donita Nose	Mark Sicat dela Cruz	Senedy Que	August 12, 2017
Norman (Donita Nose) had to hide his true gender especially to his father (Tonton Gutierrez) for many years. His luck changed when he landed on television as a props assistant turned into one of the funniest comedians in Philippine entertainment industry as "Boobay". However, his promising career almost shattered when he suffered a stroke. Supporting Cast: Tonton Gutierrez, Mickey Ferriols, Rodjun Cruz, Liezel Lopez, Pepita Curtis, Kendra
32	"Kambal na Pagmamahal" (The Connie Guarino Story)	Katrina Halili, Dion Ignacio	L.A. Madridejos	Senedy Que	August 19, 2017
Connie and Jack are a young couple who dreamed of a happy family life. However, their happy life ended with the death of Jack. But, during the funeral of Jack, Connie noticed her husband's ghost. It turned out to be Jill, Jack's identical twin brother. Supporting Cast: Gina Alajar, Djanin Cruz, Leanne Bautista, Bryce Eusebio
33	"Anak Kong Hindi Akin" (The Joel and Noelle Marcaida Story)	Max Collins, Pancho Magno	Maryo J. de los Reyes & Conrado Peru	Loi Argel Nova	August 26, 2017
Supporting Cast: Nonie Buencamino, Shamaine Buencamino, Ina Feleo
34	"Trending: Ang Babae sa Bus"	Divine Aucina	LA Madridejos	Loi Argel Nova	September 2, 2017
Note: Replay story on October 22, 2016. Supporting Cast: Gardo Versoza, Joshua Dionisio, Sue Prado, Stephanie Sol, Arny Ross, Sancho Delas Alas, Pauline Mendoza
35	"Mga Sikreto ng Aking Pamilya"	Jak Roberto	Neal del Rosario	Senedy Que	September 9, 2017
Supporting Cast: Glydel Mercado, Joko Diaz, Yul Servo, Isabelle de Leon, Dentrix Ponce, Adrian Pascual
36	"I Will Follow You" (The Popular Love Story of Jon Gutierrez and Jelai Andres)	Julie Anne San Jose, Jake Vargas	Rechie del Carmen	Jessie G. Villabrille	September 16, 2017
Jon, who is living in the United Kingdom met Jelai who is an Overseas Filipino Worker working in Qatar on Facebook. Their long distance relationship blossomed until they became known as "JoLai" for their videos that went viral. Supporting Cast: Rita Avila, Allan Paule, Gillette Sandico, Koreen Medina, Reese Tuazon, Paolo Gumabao, Maricris Garcia
37	"Beki Ka, Tibo Ako, Forever Tayo" (The Genimi Naraga and Myen Oronan Story)	Inah de Belen, Martin del Rosario	Rechie del Carmen	Charlotte Dianco	September 23, 2017
Supporting Cast: Al Tantay, Glenda Garcia, Nina Ricci Alagao, Eva Darren, Mike Magat, Kyle Vergara, Carl Cervantes, Analyn Barro
38	"My Unlawful Husband"	Carla Abellana	Adolf Alix Jr.	Senedy Que	September 30, 2017
Because of her experiences as a young child, Sandy (Carla Abellana) dreamt of becoming a lawyer and help women and children who are victims of physical, sexual and psychological abuse. When they were married, her husband (Neil Ryan Sese) became faithful to her. But, she would find out that he is also a suspect for sexually abusing their adoptive child. Will Sandy defend him for his unlawful behavior, or will she prosecute him? Supporting Cast: Lotlot De Leon, Neil Ryan Sese, Mon Confiado, Elle Ramirez, Catherine Remperas, Jenzel
39	"Ang Pagmamahal ng Isang Amang... Beki" (The Jeremy Sabido Story)	Cris Villanueva, Miguel Tanfelix	Neal del Rosario	Jessie G. Villabrille	October 7, 2017
A StarStruck season 7 avenger Jeremy (Miguel Tanfelix) was adopted by a gay beautician Pepito (Cris Villanueva) after his father abandoned him and his siblings. He grew up with Pepito as his father. Although he is gay, Pepito gave all the love and obligations as a father to Jeremy. Supporting Cast: Leandro Baldemor, Mel Martinez, Jude De Jesus, Kyle Ocampo, Mara Alberto, Nicole Donesa, Prince Villanueva, Joshua Jacobe, Ranty Portento
40	"Ang Nanay sa Kalsada" (The Emilyn Baclao Story)	Ai-Ai Delas Alas	Maryo J. de los Reyes & Conrado Peru	Vienuel Ello	October 14, 2017
Supporting Cast: Gary Estrada, Lou Veloso, Rosemarie Sarita, Faith Da Silva, Zymic Jaranilla, James Teng, Tetay, John Kennedy, Jhiz Deocareza, Xyrus Cruz, Karlo Duterte, Skelly
41	"Ang Puso ng Isang Guro" (The Luzviminda Goto-Ojeda Story)	LJ Reyes	Gina Alajar	Senedy Que	October 21, 2017
Supporting Cast: Ryan Eigenmann, Melissa Mendez, Dominic Roco, Vaness del Moral, Renz Valerio, Jacob Briz, Bryan Benedict, Dexter Doria, Rolly Inocencio
42	"Nika Manika" (The Possessed Doll)	Kiko Estrada, Sophie Albert	Rechie del Carmen	Vienuel Ello	October 28, 2017
Supporting Cast: Gerald Madrid, Lovely Rivero, David Remo, Zachie Rivera, DJ Durano, Angeli Bayani, Jay Arcilla, Dex Quindoza, Lao Rodriguez
43	"BSF: Best Sisters Forever" (The Lagdamat Sisters Story)	Sunshine Dizon, Diana Zubiri, Sheena Halili, Sanya Lopez	Gil Tejada Jr.	Jessie G. Villabrille	November 4, 2017
The story of about the four sisters who face the greatest challenges when one of their sisters is diagnosed with chronic kidney disease. Supporting Cast: Snooky Serna, Rafa Siguion-Reyna, Juancho Trivino
44	"My Heart Belongs to You" (The Bud and Gloria Brown Story)	Ivan Dorschner, Denise Barbacena	Joel Lamangan	Charlotte Dianco	November 11, 2017
Supporting Cast: Patricia Ysmael, Hannah Precillas, Travis Kraft, Rubi Rubi, Jim Pebanco
45	"Anak Mo, Anak Ko, Anak Natin"	Sharmaine Arnaiz, Yasmien Kurdi	Gina Alajar	Honey Hidalgo	November 18, 2017
Supporting Cast: Bing Davao, Richard Quan, Ina Feleo, Dentrix Ponce, Liezel Lopez, Elijah Alejo, Euwenn Mikael Aleta, Maey Bautista, Erlinda Villalobos, Jayzelle Suan
46	"Kuwentong Marawi Sa Mata ng Isang Sundalo" (The Jomille Pavia Story)	Alden Richards	Mark dela Cruz	Loi Nova	November 25, 2017
Supporting Cast: Roi Vinzon, Perla Bautista, Susan Africa, Ervic Vijandre, Phytos Ramirez, Reese Tuazon, Marc Justine Alvarez
47	"God, Save My Daughter"	Gabby Eigenmann, Glydel Mercado	Neal del Rosario	Jessie G. Villabrille	December 2, 2017
Supporting Cast: Ar Angel Aviles, Dave Bornea, Nicole Donesa, Kyle Vergara, Cathy Tan
48	"Batik: Ang Santa Claus ng Tarlac" (The Alberto Sebastian Story)	Super Tekla	Rechie del Carmen	Loi Argel Nova	December 9, 2017
Supporting Cast: Chanda Romero, Gladys Reyes, Odette Khan, Diva Montelaba, Zymic Jaranilla, Arjan Jimenez
49	"My Christmas Lullaby" (The Loida Bauto Story)	Katrina Halili, Rodjun Cruz	Dominic Zapata	Jason John Lim	December 16, 2017
Known in the family as an achiever from elementary to college, Loida (Katrina Halili) grew up always on top of their class, even graduating with high honors and became a licensed interior designer. However, all the hard work she did upon getting employed took the best of her, when she suddenly fainted pitch black. After regaining her consciousness, things were never the same for her when she and her family found out that she has acquired a rare condition—Arteriovenous Malformation. How will Loida face this tough challenge in her life? Supporting Cast: Glenda Garcia, Shermaine Santiago, Arra San Agustin, Don Umali
50	"Ang Rampa ng Buhay Ko" (The Sinon Loresca, Jr. Story)	Sinon Loresca	Mark dela Cruz	Senedy Que	December 23, 2017
Sinon suffered cruelty by his parents because of his homosexuality. But, he managed to run away in order for him to earn a living. But, he would be a viral sensation and later be known as "Rogelia". Note: Replay story on March 4, 2017. Supporting Cast: Joko Diaz, Sharmaine Arnaiz, Chynna Ortaleza, Mikoy Morales, Klea Pineda, Jemwell Ventinilla, Caprice Cayetano, Rob Sy, Chrome Cosio, Jonathan Wagner, Carlo Cannu
51	"Abot Kamay Ang Pangarap" (The Erwin Dayrit Story)	Erwin Dayrit	Gil Tejada Jr.	Patrick Ilagan	December 30, 2017
Erwin suffered from Osteogenesis imperfectia, a rare bone disease. He found love in the person of Helen, a beautiful young student. However, she didn't give Erwin a chance to prove his feelings for her. So Erwin decided to ease his pain by painting. Note: Replay story on March 18, 2017. Supporting Cast: Gary Estrada, Ana Capri, Aicelle Santos, Jazz Ocampo, David Remo, Rob Moya, Liezel Lopez, Sofia Pablo, Lance Serrano

=== 2018 ===
No. in season	Title	Cast	Directed by	Written by	Original release date
1	"Ang Babaeng Tinimbang Ngunit Sobra" (The Melinda Mara Story)	Barbie Forteza, Jak Roberto	Rechie Del Carmen	Charlotte Dianco	January 6, 2018
Melinda proved her love for Adrian despite her huge weight. However, she was deeply hurt by Adrian. She would prove to Adrian that she can be a better woman for her. Supporting Cast: Robert Ortega, Sherilyn Reyes, Lollie Mara, Lucho Ayala, Stephanie Sol, Eunice Lagusad, Althea Ablan, Ayeesha Cervantes, Joemarie Nielsen, Angel Satsumi, Bruce Roeland
2	"Ghost From My Past" (The Jade Martin Story)	Diana Zubiri	Adolf Alix Jr.	Vienuel Ello	January 13, 2018
Supporting Cast: Neil Ryan Sese, Vaness del Moral, Fabio Ide, Kiel Rodriguez, Maey Bautista
3	"Forgive Thy Mother" (The Jessica Bonos Story)	Snooky Serna, Irma Adlawan, Lindsay De Vera	Gina Alajar	Loi Argel Nova	January 20, 2018
Supporting Cast: Rey PJ Abellana, Leandro Baldemor, Lui Manansala, Shyr Valdez, Princess Guevarra, Leanne Bautista, Cecil Paz
4	"My Life As A Poser"	Jeric Gonzales, Kyline Alcantara	Dominic Zapata	Vienuel Ello	January 27, 2018
Supporting Cast: Gina Alajar, Bembol Roco, Faith Da Silva, Lharby Policarpio, Jenzel Go, Reese Tuazon
5	"Remember My Love" (The Gerald Cruz & Noreen Maddatu Story)	Kris Bernal, Jason Abalos	Don Michael Perez	Jessie G. Villabrille	February 3, 2018
Supporting Cast: Tina Paner, Lovely Rivero, Froilan Sales, Bruno Gabriel, Nikki Co, Kevin Sagra
6	"Mula Asawa Hanggang Awa" (A Married Woman's Story)	Manilyn Reynes, Gabby Eigenmann	Dominic Zapata	Vienuel Ello	February 10, 2018
Supporting Cast: Archie Alemania, Lovely Abella, Ashley Rivera, James Teng, Bryce Eusebio
7	"Tatay ng Lansangan" (The Butch Nerja Story)	Renz Valerio, James Blanco, Rochelle Pangilinan	Gil Tejada Jr.	Loi Argel Nova	February 17, 2018
Supporting Cast: Rita Avila, Paolo Gumabao, Irene Celebre, Ces Aldaba
8	"Anak Sa Kasinungalingan"	Tonton Gutierrez	Don Michael Perez	John Roque	February 24, 2018
Supporting Cast: Chynna Ortaleza, LJ Reyes
9	"My Nanay & I" (The Elisa & Bryson Gonzales Story)	Ai-Ai Delas Alas, Sinon Loresca	Rechie del Carmen	Jessie G. Villabrille	March 3, 2018
Supporting Cast: Juan Rodrigo, Phytos Ramirez, Nar Cabico, Kenken Nuyad
10	"Victim of Bullying"	Jaclyn Jose	Don Michael Perez	John Roque	March 10, 2018
Supporting Cast: Shamaine Buencamino, Eva Darren, David Remo, Vincent Magbanua, Edwin Reyes, John Kenneth Giducos
11	"Wife For Hire" (The Alma Bulawan Story)	Thea Tolentino, KC Montero	Dominic Zapata	Vienuel Ello	March 17, 2018
Supporting Cast: Sheree Bautista, Tom Olivar, Tetay Ocampo
12	"Our Miracle Baby" (The Omi and Gina Rullan Story)	Mark Herras, Winwyn Marquez	Gina Alajar	Charlotte Dianco	March 24, 2018
Supporting Cast: Rich Asuncion, Liezel Lopez, Marika Sasaki, Prince Clemente, Mannix Mannix, Lharby Policarpio
13	"My Sister, My Mother"	Sunshine Dizon, Therese Malvar	Gil Tejada Jr.	Vienuel Ello	April 7, 2018
Supporting Cast: Allan Paule, Lui Manansala, Dea Formilleza, Nicole Dulalia, Jenzel Angeles, Kelvin Miranda
14	"When Love Conquers All" (The Wil Dasovich and Alodia Gosiengfiao Story)	Tom Rodriguez, Janine Gutierrez	Marvin Agustin	Glaiza Ramirez	April 14, 2018
Alodia Gosienfiao (Janine Gutierrez), is known as the country's Cosplay Queen, while Wil Dasovich (Tom Rodriguez) is a social media star with his millions of followers. They have a strong relationship despite their careers. Until, Wil was diagnosed with Colon Cancer. But, Alodia's love and support urged him to fight. Supporting Cast: Jenine Desiderio, Miguel Faustmann, Rob Moya, Arianne Bautista, Ameera Johara, Sofia Pablo
15	"Hayaan Mo Sila" (The Ex Battalion Story)	Irma Adlawan, Rez Cortez, Gillete Sandico, Vera	Rechie del Carmen	Loi Argel Nova	April 21, 2018
Before "Hayaan Mo Sila" became a viral hit for 2018, different underground rap groups existed. But with a common love for rap music bonding them, they decided to merge into one as Ex Battalion. But success did not come easy at the start. Supporting Cast: Mark 'Bosx1ne' Maglasang, Archie 'Flow-G' Dela Cruz, Daryl 'Skusta Clee' Ruiz, James 'Brando' Samonte, John Maren 'Emcee Rhen' Mangabang, Jon 'King Badger' Gutierrez, Louie 'Jeckpot' Rivera, Jan Eric 'Jnskie' Quintana, Rodolfo 'Bullet-D' Bulahan
16	"Our Crazy Love"	Jeric Gonzales, Pauline Mendoza	Gil Tejada Jr.	Jessie G. Villabrille	April 28, 2018
Supporting Cast: Samantha Lopez, Jackie Lou Blanco, Gardo Versoza, Kyle Vergara
17	"The Kyline Alcantara Story"	Kyline Alcantara	Rechie del Carmen	Jessie G. Villabrille	May 5, 2018
Before being known as the so-called "La Nueva Kontrabida" a term means "New Villain", Kyline started as a young actress. However, her luck is very rare for her because she always play minor roles in different shows. Until, she was given an opportunity to star in Kambal, Karibal as Cheska de Villa. Supporting Cast: Tina Paner, Jay Manalo, Eliza Pineda, Caprice Cayetano, Bryce Eusebio, Paolo Gumabao, Bruce Roeland, Karlo Duterte, Princess Aguilar, Mega Unciano, Noel Urbano
18	"Pasan ko ang Aking Ina" (The Honeylyn and Melanie Ledesma Story)	Kris Bernal, Barbara Miguel	LA Madridejos	Glaiza Ramirez	May 12, 2018
Supporting Cast: Rodjun Cruz, Kevin Santos, Shyr Valdez, Raquel Monteza, Liezel Lopez
19	"Jackpot ng Buhay" (The Wowowin Winners Story)	Chariz Solomon, Juancho Trivino, Denise Barbacena	Conrado Peru	Honey Hidalgo	May 19, 2018
Supporting Cast: Alicia Alonzo, Maria Isabel Lopez, Glenda Garcia, Ollie Espino, Elle Ramirez, Faith Da Silva, Aaron Yanga, Orlando Sol, James Teng
20	"The Blind Teacher" (The Tina Medina Story)	Janice De Belen	Neal del Rosario	John Roque	May 26, 2018
Supporting Cast: Mika Dela Cruz, Bing Davao, Kevin Sagra, Jhiz Deocareza
21	"Ang Batang Hindi Tumatanda" (The Justin Amar Story)	Justin Amar	Rechie del Carmen	Loi Argel Nova	June 2, 2018
Supporting Cast: Lotlot De Leon, Yul Servo, Kyle Ocampo, Princess Guevarra, Althea Ablan, Mia Pangyarihan, Seth Dela Cruz
22	"Ang Kamao ng Beking Boksingero" (The Yohan Golez Story)	Super Tekla, Pancho Magno	Albert Langitan	Vienuel Ello	June 9, 2018
Supporting Cast: Dexter Doria, Ronnie Lazaro, Lharby Policarpio, Alvin Maghanoy, Jon Romano
23	"Ibalik Mo sa Akin ang Anak Ko"	Gabby Concepcion, Inah de Belen	LA Madridejos	John Roque	June 16, 2018
A father stops at nothing to find his daughter, who is kidnapped by the syndicate and is sold to the prostitution ring. Supporting Cast: Valerie Concepcion, Chinggay Riego, Tom Olivar, Analyn Barro, Raul Russo, Jon Achaval, Kiko Matos
24	"The Kyline Alcantara Story"	Kyline Alcantara	Rechie del Carmen	Jessie G. Villabrille	June 23, 2018
Before being known as the so-called "La Nueva Kontrabida" a term means "New Villain", Kyline started as a young actress. However, her luck is very rare for her because she always play minor roles in different shows. Until, she was given an opportunity to star in Kambal, Karibal as Cheska de Villa. Note: Replay story on May 5, 2018. Supporting Cast: Tina Paner, Jay Manalo, Eliza Pineda, Caprice Cayetano, Bryce Eusebio, Paolo Gumabao, Bruce Roeland, Karlo Duterte, Princess Aguilar, Mega Unciano, Noel Urbano
25	"Anak ng Kabit"	Carla Abellana	Conrado Peru	Vienuel Ello	June 30, 2018
Supporting Cast: Roi Vinzon, Yayo Aguila, Sheila Marie Rodriguez, Rafa Siguion-Reyna, Tanya Gomez, Bruno Gabriel, Angela Evangelista, Gigi Locsin
26	"Ang Batang Biktima ng Sanib"	Jillian Ward	L.A. Madridejos	Vienuel Ello	July 7, 2018
Julia is a kind and loving daughter. However, she has been a victim of demonic possession. Supporting Cast: Mickey Ferriols, Epy Quizon, Leanne Bautista
27	"Sa Kamay ng Sarili Kong Ama"	Wendell Ramos, Pauline Mendoza	Adolf Alix Jr.	Honey Hidalgo	July 14, 2018
Supporting Cast: Sherilyn Reyes, Ralph Noriega, Adrian Pascual, Ayeesha Cervantes, Luz Valdez
28	"Nakawin Natin ang Bawat Sandali"	David Licauco, Shaira Diaz	Conrado Peru	Gina Marissa Tagasa	July 21, 2018
Lisa, a Filipina meet Aron, a son of a Fil-Chinese businessman. Despite different backgrounds, they fought for their love, until Lisa's pregnancy. Supporting Cast: Bernadette Allyson, Eric Quizon, Lovely Rivero, Simon Ibarra, Janice Hung, Hannah Precillas, Ginger Ale
29	"Takbo ng Buhay Ko" (The Renson Embradura Story)	Ruru Madrid	Rechie del Carmen	Loi Argel Nova	July 28, 2018
Supporting Cast: Gardo Versoza, Isay Alvarez, Rob Moya, Arra San Agustin, Kyle Vergara, Jenzel Angeles, Julius Miguel, Rey Talosig
30	"Asawa Ko ang Bayaw Ko"	Katrina Halili, Kim Domingo, Kiko Estrada	Rechie del Carmen	Jessie G. Villabrille	August 4, 2018
Mariel and Liezel are very close. But, when their parents separated, Mariel decided to be with her father. There, she would meet Mark, a seaman, and they were married. While working in Manila, Liezel meet Michael, who is a seaman also. Both sister would soon discover that Michael and Mark are one and the same. Supporting Cast: Raquel Villavicencio, Jong Cuenco
31	"Kulam ng Karibal"	Sophie Albert	Conrado Peru	Vienuel Ello	August 11, 2018
As a young kid, April had a third eye. When she dumped Harold, he had his revenge by performing witchcraft on her. However, her ordeal was far from over. She was raped by an unknown man and became pregnant. Supporting Cast: Matt Evans, Teresa Loyzaga, Dominic Roco, Ricardo Cepeda, Luz Fernandez, Ermie Concepcion, Angelica Ulip
32	"Nakikita Kita" (A Blind Love Story)	Brandon Vera, Devon Seron	Conrado Peru	Charlotte Dianco	August 18, 2018
Supporting Cast: Glenda Garcia, Mike Lloren, Arny Ross, Karlo Duterte, Brent Valdez, Michael Angelo, Lianne Valentin
33	"Mga Batang Hubad" (The Cyberporn Family Story)	Klea Pineda	Adolf Alix Jr.	Vienuel Ello	August 25, 2018
Amid of financial scarcity in their family, the parents put their children in the online porn business to earn money and they are subsequently arrested. Note: The episode does not have the real-life guest person. Supporting Cast: Glydel Mercado, Allan Paule, Rubi Rubi, Gilleth Sandico, Chlaui Malayao, Arjan Jimenez, Bruce Roeland, John Kenneth Giducos
34	"Ang Babae sa Likod ng Blusang Itim" (The Ups and Downs of Snooky Serna)	Snooky Serna	Rechie del Carmen	Jessie G. Villabrille	September 1, 2018
Snooky Serna started her showbiz career as a child. Being the son of Von Serna and Mila Ocampo (Gloria Diaz), she rose to stardom. However, she suffered set backs when she suffered from anorexia and her stardom began to decline. But, she was determined to be what she is today. Supporting Cast: Gloria Diaz, Gary Estrada, Juan Rodrigo, Reese Tuazon, Martin Escudero, Lui Manansala, Kevin Santos, Joaquin Manansala, Kevin Sagra, Dayara Shane
35	"Ina, Dapat Ba Kitang Patawarin?"	Sunshine Dizon, Sheena Halili	Don Michael Perez	John Roque	September 8, 2018
Supporting Cast: Mon Confiado, Angeli Bayani, Rob Moya, Sue Prado, Leanne Bautista, Chanel Latorre, Angela Evangelista, Bryce Eusebio
36	"My Little Wife"	Jo Berry	L.A. Madridejos	Michiko Yamamoto	September 15, 2018
Teddy (Hiro Peralta/Jay Manalo) met Lorna (Jo Berry) in a restaurant where midgets are the employees. Both of them loved each other. Until, Teddy's mother disagrees to their relationship, because of Lorna's physical appearance. But, Teddy remained with Lorna and started a family. Note: Replay story on May 7, 2016. Supporting Cast: Jay Manalo, Shyr Valdez, Hiro Peralta, Nikki Co, Debraliz, Marnie Lapus, Elle Ramirez, Analyn Barro, Prince Clemente, Isabel Teotico
37	"Ang Asawang Naging Kabit"	Lovi Poe	Adolf Alix Jr.	Vienuel Ello	September 22, 2018
Supporting Cast: Rafael Rosell, Valeen Montenegro, Jenine Desiderio, Maria Isabel Lopez, Liezel Lopez, Marika Sasaki, Ollie Espino, Marithez Samson
38	"Kapag Tumibok Ang Puso" (The Rose and Dexter Sabido Love Story)	Tetay, Divine Aucina	Albert Langitan	Charlotte Dianco	September 29, 2018
Supporting Cast: Tetchie Agbayani, Tanya Gomez, Mel Martinez, JJ Ararao, Marlon Mance
39	"Fat and Thin, Ikaw Pa Rin" (The Gilbert and Villa Magana Story)	Jason Francisco, Boobsie	Rechie Del Carmen	Gina Marissa Tagasa	October 6, 2018
Supporting Cast: Maureen Larrazabal, Ryan Yllana, Ina Feleo, Rob Moya, Koreen Medina
40	"Kapag Lumingon Ka, Akin Ka" (The Amado "Madz" Aguilar Story)	Mark Herras, Sef Cadayona	Conrado Peru	Vienuel Ello	October 13, 2018
Madz grew up in a broken family but that did not stop him from having a happy disposition despite hardships in life. After entering Philippine show business as an extra, he rose from the ranks and became one of GMA's dependable production staff. He became an internet sensation after his online video "Kapag Lumingon Ka, Akin Ka" challenge became popular. Supporting Cast: Melissa Mendez, Toby Alejar, Ervic Vijandre, Shermaine Santiago, Kiel Rodriguez, Nikki Co, Jenzel Angeles
41	"Top of The Clash" (The Golden Cañedo Story)	Golden Cañedo	Rechie del Carmen	Loi Argel Nova	October 20, 2018
Like its host Regine Velasquez, Golden dreamed of becoming a singer. A simple girl from Cebu, she tried her luck when she joined GMA's reality singing competition "The Clash". She never knew that she will become the show's first grand winner. Note: Cañedo would eventually sing the show's theme song 5 months after this episode aired. Supporting Cast: Angelu de Leon, Bobby Andrews, Caprice Cayetano, Yanna Asistio, Suzette Ranillo, Ernie Garcia, Josh Adornado, Mirriam Manalo, Jong Madaliday, Gina Villa
42	"The Haunted Wife"	Yasmien Kurdi	Lore Reyes	Jessie G. Villabrille	October 27, 2018
Supporting Cast: Mike Tan, Neil Ryan Sese, Renz Fernandez, Seth dela Cruz, Dentrix Ponce, Zofia Quinit, Ameera Johara, Rosemarie Sarita
43	"May Forever si Lola" (The Renato Payos and Eloisa Gonzales Story)	Gina Pareño, Jay Manalo	Neal del Rosario	Gina Marissa Tagasa	November 3, 2018
Rene (Jay Manalo), a 34-year old vendor and separated from her wife met then 74-year old Eloisa (Gina Pareño), also a vendor and a widow with two daughters. Their relationship started in friendship until Rene confessed his love to Eloisa despite their age gap. Supporting Cast: Mel Kimura, Aira Bermudez, Hannah Precillas, Tonio Quiazon
44	"Yuki" (A JaPinay Story)	Joyce Ching	Albert Langitan	Jessie G. Villabrille	November 10, 2018
Supporting Cast: Gardo Versoza, Diana Zubiri, Jak Roberto, Paul Salas, Denise Barbacena, Jhoana Marie Tan, Leanne Bautista, Kyle Vergara, Angel Satsumi, Raquel Pareño
45	"Impiyerno sa Dagat (Part 1)"	Rayver Cruz, Rodjun Cruz	Don Michael Perez	Loi Argel Nova	November 17, 2018
Supporting Cast: Jazz Ocampo, Jade Lopez, Eva Darren, Aaron Yanga, Orlando Sol, Prince Clemente, Brent Valdez, Angelica Ulip, Yutaka Yamakawa, Ranty Portento
46	"Impiyerno sa Dagat (Part 2)"	Rayver Cruz, Rodjun Cruz	Don Michael Perez	Loi Argel Nova	November 24, 2018
Supporting Cast: Jazz Ocampo, Jade Lopez, Eva Darren, Aaron Yanga, Orlando Sol, Prince Clemente, Brent Valdez, Angelica Ulip, Yutaka Yamakawa, Ranty Portento
47	"Kuya Na, Nanay Pa" (The Alexis Peralta Story)	John Kenneth Giducos	Neal del Rosario	Loi Argel Nova	December 1, 2018
Supporting Cast: Ana Capri, Marco Alcaraz, Ervic Vijandre, Janna Dominguez, Chinggay Riego, Seth dela Cruz, Jude Paolo Diangson, Euwenn Aleta, Khaine dela Cruz, Kyle Kaizer
48	"Pretty Titas of Zumba" (The True Stories of Wilma Tolledana, Helen Sambo and Liezl Corro)	Sandy Andolong, Melanie Marquez, Maria Isabel Lopez	Rechie del Carmen	Vienuel Ello	December 8, 2018
Wilma (Maria Isabel Lopez) had to deal with her warfreak sons and a suicidal husband. There, she met Helen (Sandy Andolong), a former OFW who is a leader of their community zumba club. Like Wilma, Helen is also dealing with her own personal life. Her husband who abused her financially is trying to reconcile with her. Another member Liezl (Melanie Marquez), an OFW also had her own problem. Her husband is using her job to have money. Despite all the problems they are facing, there is one thing that binds them, friendship. Supporting Cast: Edwin Reyes, Simon Ibarra, Mike Lloren, Dave Bornea, Kevin Sagra, Karlo Duterte, Marika Sasaki, Kelvin Miranda
49	"Little People, Big Winners"	Ella Ong, Glenn Anastacio, Jenny Botes	Mark dela Cruz	Honey Hidalgo	December 15, 2018
Due to the popularity of GMA's primetime drama Onanay, Wowowin conducted auditions for little women to participate in the "Willie of Fortune" segment. The three chosen contestants (Ella Ong, Glenn Anastacio and Jenny Botes) had a stroke of luck when they won the Mega Jackpot. Supporting Cast: Candy Pangilinan, Dominic Roco, Renz Valerio, Phytos Ramirez, Gilleth Sandico, Kevin Sagra, Ayeesha Cervantes, Geraldine Villamil, Mega Unciano
50	"Ang Babaeng Tinimbang Ngunit Sobra" (The Melinda Mara Story)	Barbie Forteza, Jak Roberto	Rechie Del Carmen	Charlotte Dianco	December 22, 2018
Melinda proved her love for Adrian despite her huge weight. However, she was deeply hurt by Adrian. She would prove to Adrian that she can be a better woman for her. Note: Replay story on January 6, 2018. Supporting Cast: Robert Ortega, Sherilyn Reyes, Lollie Mara, Lucho Ayala, Stephanie Sol, Eunice Lagusad, Althea Ablan, Ayeesha Cervantes, Joemarie Nielsen, Angel Satsumi, Bruce Roeland
51	"Palimos ng Pag-ibig" (The Benjie and Rosel Pacaldo Story)	Benjamin Alves, Bea Binene	Conrado Peru	Jessie G. Villabrille	December 29, 2018
Supporting Cast: Luz Valdez, Tanya Gomez, Jay Arcilla, Kristine Sablan, Karenina Haniel, Troy Montero

=== 2019 ===
No. in season	Title	Cast	Directed by	Written by	Original release date
1	"Mahal Ko ang Asawa ng Ama Ko"	Katrina Halili	Paul Sta. Ana	John Roque	January 5, 2019
Following his mother's separation, an adolescent Bong becomes attracted with his father's new girlfriend and would-be stepmother named Mikaela and secretly begins his relationship to her behind his father's back. Supporting Cast: Allan Paule, Dion Ignacio, Bruce Roeland, Kelvin Miranda, Marc Justine Alvarez, Gigi Locin, Ana Castro, Jun Palatao
2	"Confessions of a Lesbian Wife" (The Maria Luisa Fonseca Story)	Jennylyn Mercado, Sheena Halili	Conrado Peru	Gina Marissa Tagasa	January 12, 2019
Maloy/Bogs (Jennylyn Mercado) a lesbian met a fellow lesbian Bebeth (Sheena Halili). The two of them developed and had a relationship. However, due to misunderstanding, they separated. But, Bogs met Lando (Pancho Magno). Despite her sexual preference, she fell in love with Lando and they were married. Supporting Cast: Pancho Magno, Lui Manansala, Tess Bomb, Rolando Inocencio
3	"Fathers and Lovers"	Paolo Contis, Kristofer Martin	Adolf Alix Jr.	Vienuel Ello	January 19, 2019
Supporting Cast: Lui Manansala, Gigi Locsin, Lovely Abella, Paolo Paraiso, Yasser Marta, Elle Ramirez, Sue Prado, Ruby Rose Arcilla, Jayla Villaruel, Perry Escaño, Neptune Sison
4	"Arrest My Son's Rapist"	Gelli de Belen, Will Ashley	Neal del Rosario	Vienuel Ello	January 26, 2019
Chris (Will Ashley) grew up having hard feelings to his mother Thelma (Gelli de Belen). Things changed when Chris met his teacher Jacob (Lucho Ayala) who happens to be Thelma's distant relative. He never knew that the so-called third parent of Chris would take advantage of him. Supporting Cast: Lucho Ayala, Don Umali, Sofia Pablo
5	"BUSta't Kasama Kita" (The Aurelio and Menchie Love Story)	Zoren Legaspi, Ashley Ortega	Jorron Lee Monroy	Jessie Villabrille	February 2, 2019
Aurelio and Menchie both met inside a bus had different ups and downs with love. Aurelio left by his love, while Menchie was dumped by her boyfriend. Supporting Cast: Bodjie Pascua, Jenine Desiderio, Archie Adamos, Ameera Johara
6	"Tatlong Henerasyon ng Sipag at Tiyaga" (The Cynthia Villar Story)	Lotlot de Leon, Glydel Mercado, Gardo Versoza	Mark A. Reyes	Gina Marissa Tagasa	February 9, 2019
A special presentation on the life of Senator Cynthia Villar (Chlaui Malayao/Thea Tolentino/Glydel Mercado) and the two women that honed her to what she has been. It all started with her grandmother Celestina (Sanya Lopez/Valerie Concepcion/Marita Zobel). She never had a chance to study, however she persevered for her family especially her son Filemon (Gardo Versoza) who would eventually marry Lydia (Lotlot de Leon), a school teacher. For Cynthia, the hardwork and perseverance of her grandmother and mother became her inspiration in helping people. Supporting Cast: Christian Vasquez, Valerie Concepcion, Chlaui Malayao, Sanya Lopez, Marita Zobel, Thea Tolentino, Benjamin Alves, Juancho Trivino, Faith da Silva, Ervic Vijandre, James Teng, Prince Clemente, Seth dela Cruz
7	"Bata, Bata, Kriminal o Biktima?"	Tonton Gutierrez	Rechie del Carmen	Jason Lim	February 16, 2019
A controversial episode which aired a week after Philippine Congress decided to vote to lower the age of criminal responsibility in the country. Supporting Cast: Lilet, Dentrix Ponce, Euwenn Aleta, Bryce Eusebio, Jacob Briz, Julius Miguel, Princess Aguilar
8	"Mula Zamboanga Hanggang Sementeryo" (The Ethel Nierras Story)	Manilyn Reynes	Don Michael Perez	John Roque	February 23, 2019
Supporting Cast: Eunice Lagusad, Irma Adlawan, Mel Kimura, Marlon Mance, Honey Lou Nierras
9	"Never Give Up" (The Ken Chan and Rita Daniela Story)	Ken Chan, Rita Daniela	Philip Lazaro	Jessie G. Villabrille	March 2, 2019
Before being known for their characters as Boyet and Aubrey in My Special Tatay, Rita Daniela and Ken Chan started their showbiz careers as a young age. Rita came to stardom when she won in the singing search Popstar Kids. Ken, who came from a Filipino-Chinese family rise to stardom as part of Tween Hearts. Supporting Cast: Sharmaine Arnaiz, Shyr Valdez, Jong Cuenco, William Lorenzo, Nicole Donesa
10	"Huwag Ate, Huwag Bayaw"	Kim Rodriguez, Rodjun Cruz, Ervic Vijandre, Faith da Silva	Jorron Lee Monroy	Vienuel Ello	March 9, 2019
Supporting Cast: Lovely Rivero, Mike Lloren, Rissian Rein Adriano, Kim Belles
11	"Anak, Bakit Ka Nagkaganyan?"	Lotlot de Leon, Therese Malvar	Adolfo Alix Jr.	Karen P. Lustica	March 16, 2019
Supporting Cast: Gerald Madrid, Andrew Schimmer, Nikki Co, Angela Evangelista
12	"Viral Macho Dancer" (The Dante Gulapa Story)	Jak Roberto	Conrado Peru	John Roque	March 23, 2019
Because of poverty, Dante decided to earn even if it caused his own humanity. He works as a macho dancer in a gay bar. But, his luck change when his dance video to the tune of the song "Kahit Ayaw Mo Na" became a viral hit on social media. Supporting Cast: Maureen Larrazabal, Rich Asuncion, John Kenneth Giducos, Vangie Labalan, Analyn Barro, Kevin Sagra, Orlando Sol, Dante Gulapa
13	"Drive Me Crazy" (The Matet Craig Story)	Glaiza de Castro	Jorron Lee Monroy	John Roque	March 30, 2019
Supporting Cast: Paolo Paraiso, Geleen Eugenio, Chinggay Riego, Marika Sasaki
14	"Sumpa ng Kalendaryo"	Megan Young, Benjamin Alves	Jorron Lee Monroy	Vienuel Ello	April 6, 2019
Ronnie, a seminarian and Sonia, a novice decided to leave their Religious profession to start a new life and a family. Their luck changed when they brought a calendar with the image of the suffering Jesus Christ. Little did they know that the image that will give blessing to them, will bring bad luck to them. Supporting Cast: Rob Moya, Rosemarie Sarita
15	"Nang Ako'y Iwan Mo"	Mikee Quintos, Yasser Marta	Monti Parungao	Jessie G. Villabrille	April 13, 2019
Yami (Yasser Marta) met Mila (Mikee Quintos) in high school. Mila's pregnancy disappointed her parents, because she promised never to have a relationship until she finished studies. After many years, they decided to marry. However, a motorcycle accident would end the life of Mila, as their wedding draws near. Supporting Cast: Rita Avila, Leandro Baldemor, Lui Manansala, Prince Clemente, Yvette Sanchez
16	"Male Sex Slave sa Saudi"	Jeric Gonzales	Don Michael Perez	Vienuel Ello	April 27, 2019
Supporting Cast: Denise Barbacena, Sue Prado, Juan Rodrigo, Geraldine Villamil, Joaquin Manansala, Raul Russo, Bryan del Rosario, Julius Miguel
17	"From Poser to Forever" (The Marvin and Jane Bedonia Love Story)	Jerald Napoles, Kiray Celis	LA Madridejos	John Roque	May 4, 2019
Supporting Cast: Tanya Gomez, Elle Ramirez, Kiko Matos, Luri Nalus, Danielle Ozarriaga
18	"A Woman's Revenge" (A Mother's Day Presentation)	Angelika dela Cruz	Jorron Lee Monroy	Karen P. Lustica	May 11, 2019
Eva had to deal with her partner Ace, who is a womanizer. Until one day, she castrates Ace while he is drunk. However, love would be the way to forgive one another. Supporting Cast: Krystal Reyes, Emilio Garcia, Jade Lopez, Melbelline Caluag
19	"Beki Basketball Beauties"	Martin Escudero, Phytos Ramirez, Buboy Villar, Donita Nose, Kelvin Miranda	Jorron Lee Monroy	Vienuel Ello	May 18, 2019
Supporting Cast: Ralph Noriega, Tom Olivar, Gigi Locsin, Ollie Espino, Anthony Rosaldo, Arny Ross, JC Tan
20	"1 Milyong Pasasalamat kay Ina"	Ai-Ai Delas Alas, Martin del Rosario	Rechie del Carmen	Loi Argel Nova	May 25, 2019
Beng (Ai-Ai delas Alas) does everything for her children especially her son Rotski (Martin del Rosario). However, Rotski suffered an accident that left him half paralyzed. In order to repay for all the sacrifices of his mother, Rotski decided to surprise her with a game show-like gift. He gave her P 1 million cash that became an instant online hit. Supporting Cast: Rey PJ Abellana, Marc Justine Alvarez, Liezel Lopez, Jenzel Angeles, Jayla Villaruel, Rein Adriano, Princess Aguilar
21	"Yanig ng Buhay" (The Pampanga Earthquake Victims Story)	Bea Binene, Thea Tolentino, Yul Servo, Jay Arcilla	LA Madridejos	Loi Argel Nova	June 1, 2019
A special episode on the 2019 Luzon earthquake. Pampanga was one of the most badly hit provinces when a magnitude 6.1 earthquake struck the epicenter of Zambales. This chaos was evidently seen in a supermarket in Porac, which collapsed and killed at least five individuals. How did this tragedy affect their families? Supporting Cast: Euwenn Aleta, Louise Bolton
22	"Nakawin Natin ang Bawat Sandali"	David Licauco, Shaira Diaz	Conrado Peru	Gina Marissa Tagasa	June 8, 2019
Lisa, a Filipina meet Aron, a son of a Fil-Chinese businessman. Despite different backgrounds, they fought for their love, until Lisa became pregnant. However after many years, she worked as a housemaid to a Chinese couple. It found out, that his employer is Art on. Note: Replay story on July 21, 2018. Supporting Cast: Bernadette Allyson, Eric Quizon, Lovely Rivero, Simon Ibarra, Janice Hung, Hannah Precillas, Ginger Ale
23	"Kailan Naging Ama ang Isang Babae? (Part 1)" (The Roxanne D'Salles Epic Story)	Juancho Trivino, Rodjun Cruz, David Remo	Zig Madamba Dulay	John Roque	June 15, 2019
Roxanne D'Salles, or Ronaldo Aggabao in real life (Juancho Trivino) is a former US Army who never had a chance to see her children. Until, she became one of the first Filipinos to undergo sex reassignment surgery. Supporting Cast: Shyr Valdez, Archie Adamos, Nicole Donesa, Kelley Day, Aaron Concepcion, Klariz Magboo
24	"Kailan Naging Ama ang Isang Babae? (Part 2)" (The Roxanne D'Salles Epic Story)	Allen Dizon	Zig Madamba Dulay	John Roque	June 22, 2019
Supporting Cast: Clint Bondad, Dave Bornea, Analyn Barro, Jenny Miller, Kayana Klaws, April Gustilo
25	"Ang Pagmulat ng Binulag na Kasambahay" (The Bonita Baran Story)	Barbie Forteza	Conrado Peru	Gina Marissa Tagasa	June 29, 2019
Bonita who was only 17 years old when she worked as a housemaid. In her stay, she was to suffer cruelty at the hands of her employers Anna Liza Catahan (Bing Loyzaga) and her partner Reynaldo Marzan (Jong Cuenco). What's worst is that Anna Liza blinded Bonita with a hot iron. Her case became one of the most sensational cases in the Philippines that led to the apprehension of the Marzan couple and paved the way for the passing of Republic Act 10361, known as the "Kasambahay Law" that protects the rights of every housemaids in the country. Note: A disclaimer was aired by Mel Tiangco before the episode where she revealed that Bonita's life story was supposed to be aired 5 years ago, but had to wait for legal impediments to be cleared until the episode was finally given the green light by the GMA management. Supporting Cast: Bing Loyzaga, Jong Cuenco, Don Umali, Raquel Pareño, Angela Evangelista
26	"Lotto Winner, Naging Loser"	Super Tekla	LA Madridejos	Michiko Yamamoto	July 6, 2019
Erwin who lived a simple life nothing wanted but to have a good life for his wife Virgie and their children. His luck changed when he won 79 Million Pesos in the Lottery Draw. Because he is so naive of his winnings, he entrusted his winning ticket to his cousins Manuel (Ian de Leon) and Angel (Tonio Quiazon). However, when he received the money, he only received 3.9 Million Pesos. Little did he know that his cousins whom he entrusted had already taken advantage of the money that he had won to use for their own interests. Supporting Cast: Ian de Leon, Vaness del Moral, Dexter Doria, Tonio Quiazon
27	"Mamili Ka, Ako o Anak Ko?"	Amy Austria	Neal Del Rosario	Vienuel Ello	July 13, 2019
Salve (Amy Austria) and Manuel (Neil Ryan Sese) are a good couple. However, when he met his soon-to-be stepdaughter Lucilla (Pauline Mendoza) things suddenly change. Supporting Cast: Neil Ryan Sese, Pauline Mendoza, Leanne Bautista, Zonia Mejia, Erlinda Villalobos
28	"Patawad, Ama Ko"	Dennis Trillo	Adolf Alix Jr.	John Roque	July 20, 2019
Samuel suffered not only physical but emotional and psychological abuses at the hands of his own father. However, he didn't stop from proving himself. However, the abuses that he had suffered from his father led him to become disoriented until he came into an irreversable decision that he will forever regret. Supporting Cast: Allan Paule, Sheila Marie Rodriguez, Chinggay Riego, Ana De Leon, Bruce Roeland, Seth Dela Cruz, Orlando Sol
29	"Ang Batang Sinagip ng Kapre"	Luz Valdez	Zoren Legaspi	Karen P. Lustica	July 27, 2019
Supporting Cast: Rich Asuncion, Dion Ignacio, Sue Prado, Rein Adriano
30	"My Viral Single Tatay"	Derrick Monasterio	Conrado Peru	Loi Argel Nova	August 3, 2019
Supporting Cast: Tina Paner, Jenine Desiderio, Faith da Silva, John Kenneth Giducos, Rosemarie Sarita
31	"Nagmahal, Nasaktan, Pinagsamantalahan"	Liezel Lopez	Gil Tejada Jr.	Vienuel Ello	August 10, 2019
Supporting Cast: Marco Alcaraz, Gilleth Sandico, Mia Pangyarihan, Mike Lloren, Mela Habijan
32	"Mula Puso Hanggang Buto" (The Blissie Cervantes Story)	Joyce Ching	Rechie Del Carmen	Gina Marissa Tagasa	August 17, 2019
Boy and Elsa had to deal with their children who suffered from Osteogenesis Imperfecta. But their eldest child Blissie proved that behind the disease, she had to go on living for her family. Note: This marked the return to television of Vivian Foz and Ariosto Reyes Jr. Supporting Cast: Vivian Foz, Ariosto Reyes Jr., Lucho Ayala, Ayeesha Cervantes
33	"Kung Hindi Ka Magiging Akin"	Boobay, Dentrix Ponce	Don Michael Perez & Jorron Lee Monroy	Vienuel Ello	August 24, 2019
On July 4, 2019, the whole nation was in shocked when Mark Anthony Miranda, a Grade 7 student was shot dead inside Castor Alviar National High School in Calamba, Laguna. The student was dead on arrival while the suspect Renz Ivan Valderama escaped until he was apprehended. The student claimed that he broke-up with the guard due to molestation that he suffered. Note: Although this is based on actual events, the details of the story as well as the names of the victim and suspect were changed due to sensitivity of the episode. Supporting Cast: Odette Khan, Jemwell Ventenilla, Chanel Latorre, Jun Palattao
34	"The Girl in the Sex Video Scandal"	Jak Roberto, Klea Pineda	Don Michael Perez	Jessie Villabrille	August 31, 2019
Supporting Cast: Tanya Gomez, Jay Arcilla, Kelvin Miranda, Erin Ocampo, Shanicka Arganda, Claire Castro, Ana Castro
35	"Ang Pumatay ng Dahil sa'yo"	Mark Herras, Jeric Gonzales, Yasser Marta	Monti Parungao	Loi Argel Nova	September 7, 2019
Supporting Cast: Andrew Schimmer, David Remo, Will Ashley, Seth Dela Cruz, Prince Clemente
36	"Asawa Ko ang Bayaw Ko"	Katrina Halili, Kim Domingo, Kiko Estrada	Rechie Del Carmen	Jessie G. Villabrille	September 14, 2019
Mariel and Liezel are very close. But, when their parents separated, Mariel decided to live with her father. There, she met Mark, a seaman, and they were married. While working in Manila, Liezel meet Michael, who is also a seaman. Both sister would soon discover that Michael and Mark are one and the same. Note: Replay story on August 4, 2018. Supporting Cast: Raquel Villavicencio, Jong Cuenco
37	"Ang Babaeng Binulag ng Pag-ibig"	Sanya Lopez	Conrado Peru	Vienuel Ello	September 21, 2019
News about a woman who suffered an acid attack that caused her eyesight became the main topic on social media. Glory Cuerda, a mall salelady and John Rey Garay, a guard fell in love with each other. However, Mona, John Ray's former love avenged at Glory by pouring acid on Glory. Note: Although this is based on actual events, the details of the story as well as the names of the victim and suspect were changed due to sensitivity of the episode. Supporting Cast: Jon Lucas, Nar Cabico, Geraldine Villamil, Gino Ilustre, Tenten Mendoza
38	"Magkapatid, Biktima ng Kulto"	Max Collins, Ashley Ortega, Ervic Vijandre	Don Michael Perez	Karen P. Lustica	September 28, 2019
Supporting Cast: Maritess Joaquin, Basil Bolinao
39	"StarStruck Ultimate Survivors"	Kim de Leon, Shayne Sava, Allen Ansay, Lexi Gonzales	Don Michael Perez	Jessie G. Villabrille	October 5, 2019
Kim, Shayne, Allen and Lexi struggled for their families and for their dreams. This happened when they joined the first reality-based talent search StarStruck. Eventually, they would join the ranks of Jennylyn Mercado, Mark Herras, and other artists that were products of the said talent search. Supporting Cast: Geleen Eugenio, Gerald Madrid, Angeli Bayani, Robert Ortega, Mel Kimura, Pamela Prinster, Abdul Raman
40	"Adik Sa'yo" (The Radji Kem Galos Story)	Ruru Madrid	Neal del Rosario	John Roque	October 12, 2019
Supporting Cast: Al Tantay, Irma Adlawan, Shermaine Santiago, Brent Valdez, Jenzel Angeles
41	"Psychic from Dumaguete" (The Rasha Mae Sarne Story)	Mike Tan, Shaira Diaz	Joel Lamangan	Vienuel Ello	October 19, 2019
Rasha is no ordinary woman. She can predict the future and some of her predictions that she posted on social media came true. These include the bombing of a mosque in Zamboanga and the bombings in Jolo, Sulu. Supporting Cast: Sheila Marie Rodriguez, Caprice Cayetano, Gigi Locsin, Jim Pebanco, Raquel Pareño, Don Umali
42	"Pati Ba Pintig ng Puso?"	Lovi Poe	Neal del Rosario	Vienuel Ello	October 26, 2019
Supporting Cast: Jenine Desiderio, Leandro Baldemor, Dominic Roco, Kyle Ocampo, James Teng, Princess Aguilar, JJ Ararao, Anna Vicente
43	"Baklash" (The Viral Prinsesitas' Showdown)	Sander "Lala" Vileganio, Mark Jhay "MJ" Ortega	Jorron Lee Monroy	Jessie G. Villabrille	November 2, 2019
Supporting Cast: Jay Manalo, Epi Quizon, Lovely Rivero, Candy Pangilinan, Orlando Sol, Tess Bomb, Rob Moya, Carlo Cannu, Marinella Alexa Sevidal
44	"Langit Ka, Lupa Ako"	Mark Herras, Nicole Donesa	Zig Madamba Dulay	Vienuel Ello	November 9, 2019
A love story between Mencio, a factory worker who fell in love with Kim, a Filipino-Chinese. However, Kim's parents disapprove their relationship because of their different state in life. But Mencio proved that he loves Kim not because he wanted to gain wealth, but because of the goodness of his heart. Supporting Cast: Teresa Loyzaga, Jong Cuenco, Lao Rodriguez, Kevin Sagra, Alchris Galura, Lowell Conales
45	"Sagip Buhay ng Kaaway" (The Sultan Binjihad Guro and Sgt. Antonio Casilis Story)	John Estrada, Rayver Cruz	Dominic Zapata	Loi Argel Nova	November 16, 2019
Supporting Cast: Karla Pambid, Faith Da Silva, Bryan Benedict, Vincent Magbanua
46	"Sino ang Baliw?"	Glaiza de Castro	Neal del Rosario	Vienuel Ello	November 23, 2019
Supporting Cast: Snooky Serna, Pancho Magno, Mike Lloren, Arny Ross, April Gustilo
47	"Yaya Dubai and I"	Herlene Budol	Jorron Lee Monroy	Tina Samson-Velasco	November 30, 2019
Supporting Cast: Lotlot de Leon, Vaness del Moral, Mike Agassi, Euwenn Aleta, Marlon Mance, Ana De Leon, Joaquin Manansala
48	"OFW Most Wanted (Part 1)"	Dennis Trillo	Zig Madamba Dulay	John Roque	December 7, 2019
Supporting Cast: Lito Pimentel, Richard Quan, Paolo Paraiso, Ina Feleo, Lui Manansala, David Remo, Seth dela Cruz, Angel Guardian, Karl Medina, Ricky Pascua, Ana Castro
49	"OFW Most Wanted (Part 2)"	Dennis Trillo	Zig Madamba Dulay	John Roque	December 14, 2019
Supporting Cast: Lito Pimentel, Richard Quan, Paolo Paraiso, Ina Feleo, Lui Manansala, David Remo, Seth dela Cruz, Angel Guardian, Karl Medina, Ricky Pascua, Ana Castro
50	"Sana Ngayong Pasko"	Amy Austria, Miguel Tanfelix	Don Michael Perez	Jessie G. Villabrille	December 21, 2019
Supporting Cast: Archie Adamos, Raphael Landicho, Jeremy Sabido, Angela Evangelista
51	"Paskong Malamig Ang Puso"	Alice Dixson	Bb. Joyce Bernal	Agnes Gagelonia-Uligan	December 28, 2019
She's beautiful, she's rich and she has a very successful career, but despite all these assets she have, Grace (Alice Dixson) remains single. Her dream of becoming a mother is shattered when she had myoma, a tumor that completely stripped off her chances of having a baby. Now considered as an old maid, Grace still continues her quest in finding the man destined to be her other half. Note: Replay story on December 19, 2015. Supporting Cast: Tessie Tomas, Sheila Marie Rodriguez, Samantha Lopez, Shelly Hipolito, Prince Villanueva, Jay Gonzaga, Ken Alfonso
