= List of Maynila episodes =

Maynila (lit. Manila) is a weekly anthology of inspiring stories. The series aired on GMA Network's every Sunday. The show is hosted by Lito Atienza.

== Episode list ==
=== Unknown ===
No.	Title	Cast	Original release date
TBA	"Bestfriends and a Girl"	Sarah Lahbati: Ina; Rocco Nacino: Bogs	TBA
Supporting Cast: Jan Manual, Cai Cortez; Special participation: Mayor Lito Atienza as Tito Santi
TBA	"Bored to Love"	Ann Li: Jena; Bret Jackson: JM	TBA
Supporting Cast: Patrick Sugui, Fretzie Bercede
TBA	"Broken Vow"	Jackie Rice: Erica; Marky Cielo: Brent	TBA
Supporting Cast: Aiza Marquez, Iwa Moto, Gian Carlos, Renz Valerio, Kim Suarez
TBA	"Go for Love"	Nadine Samonte: Heidi; Tyrone Perez: Kent	TBA
Supporting Cast: Marissa Sanchez, Kokoy Palma, Joma Rivera
TBA	"Ikaw Lang"	Rhian Ramos: Julie; JC Tiuseco: Lawrence	TBA
Supporting Cast: Jade Lopez, Stef Prescott
TBA	"Let it Out"	LJ Reyes: Lea; Paulo Avelino: Owen	TBA
Supporting Cast: Patani Dano, Jan Manual
TBA	"Love Sick"	Sheena Halili: Karen; Rainier Castillo: Andrei	TBA
Supporting Cast: Josef Elizalde, Kristel Moreno
TBA	"Ms. Popular"	Antoinette Taus: Tanya; Marky Lopez: Donald	TBA
Supporting Cast: Maggie Wilson, Russel C. Mon, Safeeya Awadi
TBA	"Pattern of Devotion"	Louise delos Reyes: Fran; Alden Richards: Paul	TBA
Supporting Cast: Joy Viado, Mitoy Yonting; Special participation: Mayor Lito Atienza as John
TBA	"Right Way to Love"	Rhian Ramos: Loren; Dion Ignacio: Carlo	TBA
Supporting Cast: CJ Muere, Charee Pineda, Angel Estrada
TBA	"Star Collision"	Max Collins: Meg; Enrique Gil: Tim	TBA
Supporting Cast: Dexter Doria (Gina), Liza Ranillo; Special participation: Mayor Lito Atienza as Uncle Bobby
TBA	"Tender Loving Care"	Kris Bernal: Julie; Aljur Abrenica: Mike	TBA
Supporting Cast: Jade Lopez, Patani Daño
TBA	"The Right One"	Jackie Rice: Shane; Marky Cielo: Paolo	TBA
Supporting Cast: Maybelyn dela Cruz, Adrian Albert, Nina Medina

=== 2004 ===
No.	Title	Cast	Original release date
TBA	"Forgive... Four-Gives"	Anne Curtis: Cindy; Mico Palanca: Vince	February 7, 2004
Supporting Cast: Denise Laurel as Berna, Oman Ramos as Daddy

=== 2005 ===
No.	Title	Cast	Original release date
TBA	"Sweet Surrender"	Jennylyn Mercado: Annie; Mark Herras: Mike	October 29, 2005
Supporting Cast: John Medina as Ron, Ailyn Luna as Tina, Joy Isidoro as Lea

=== 2006 ===
No.	Title	Cast	Original release date
TBA	"Heart Beat"	Rhian Ramos: Mia; Felix Roco: Carl	September 9, 2006
Supporting Cast: Dominic Roco, Sheena Halili, John Emmanuel Sison
TBA	"Love in Bloom"	Rhian Ramos: Carla; Ahron Villena: Mike	December 9, 2006
Supporting Cast: CJ Muere, Jade Lopez

=== 2007 ===
No.	Title	Cast	Original release date
TBA	"Power of Love"	Rhian Ramos: Ann; Carlo Aquino: Karl	January 20, 2007
Supporting Cast: Rhea Nakpil, Adrian Albert
TBA	"True Face of Love"	Ryza Cenon: Charm; Kirby de Jesus: Sonny	February 24, 2007
Supporting Cast: Isabel Oli, Paolo Paraiso
TBA	"True Love"	Ryza Cenon: Maita; Jay Aquitania: Mike	June 9, 2007
Supporting Cast: CJ Muere, Star Villareal, Paulo Avelino
TBA	"Sweet and Straight"	Ryza Cenon: Loren; Jeremy Marquez: Eric	August 25, 2007
Supporting Cast: Kirby de Jesus, Tess Bomb
TBA	"Heart's Trophy"	Glaiza de Castro: Jaja; Marky Cielo: Zach	September 8, 2007
Supporting Cast: Vaness del Moral, Jelaine Santos, Maria Criselda Amistad
TBA	"Tug of Hearts"	LJ Reyes: Carla; Hero Angeles: Mike	September 22, 2007
Supporting Cast: Jackie Rice, Angel Estrada, Miles Bonoan

=== 2008 ===
No.	Title	Cast	Original release date
TBA	"I Guess, I Love"	Ryza Cenon: Raisa; Mark Herras: Marco	February 9, 2008
Supporting Cast: Stef Prescott, Roman Olivarez
TBA	"Prince Charming"	Rhian Ramos: Sam; Hero Angeles: Alex	April 12, 2008
Supporting Cast: Charee Pineda, Lotlot Bustamante
TBA	"Open Your Heart"	Ryza Cenon: Emma; Mike Tan: James	April 26, 2008
Supporting Cast: Christian Vasquez, Mariz Ricketts, Patricia Liwanag
TBA	"Lean on Me"	Lovi Poe: Sandy; Mark Herras: Carlo	August 9, 2008
Supporting Cast: Alvin Anson, Kalila Aguilos, TJ Valderama
TBA	"Waiting Love"	Ryza Cenon: Rachelle; Rainier Castillo: Ryan	September 20, 2008
Supporting Cast: Joseph Bitangcol, Mhyca Bautista, Joy Viado
TBA	"Second Chances"	Paw Diaz: Kate; Felix Roco: James	November 15, 2008
Supporting Cast: Jade Lopez, Lovely Rivero, Gigette Reyes

=== 2009 ===
No.	Title	Cast	Original release date
TBA	"Fight or Hide"	Sheena Halili: Nikki; Dino Imperial: Ariel	January 10, 2009
Supporting Cast: Tessbomb, Gerald Madrid, Cynthia Yapchingco
TBA	"Sweet Melody"	Erich Gonzales: Sara; Carlo Aquino: Joel	February 7, 2009
Supporting Cast: Louise Bolton, TJ Valderama, Encar Benedicto
TBA	"TBA"	Mark Herras: Ian; Bangs Garcia: Fiona	February 14, 2009
Supporting Cast: TBA
TBA	"Pare Ko!"	Mark Herras: Mark; Rainier Castillo: Alex	September 5, 2009
Supporting Cast: Sam Pinto, Aizets Tanyag
TBA	"Death, Be Not Proud"	Jennica Garcia: Vina; Marvin Raymundo: Alex	October 31, 2009
Supporting Cast: Arci Muñoz, Patani Dano, Miggy Valdez
TBA	"Life's Lesson"	Lauren Young: Marie; Arron Villaflor: Kristoff	TBA
Supporting Cast: TBA

=== 2010 ===
No.	Title	Cast	Original release date
1	"Date Ko 'To"	Diva Montelaba: Sofia; Alex Castro: Glen	January 9, 2010
Supporting Cast: Coleen Garcia, Eduard Duallo; Special participation: Mayor Lito Atienza as Father Mike
TBA	"Victims of Love"	Julie Anne San Jose: Tracy; Elmo Magalona: Joey	January 23, 2010
Supporting Cast: Dang Amistad; Special participation: Mayor Lito Atienza as Uncle Rey
TBA	"Kuya's Girl"	Mark Herras: Drew; Jessy Mendiola: Leah	February 6, 2010
Supporting Cast: BJ Forbes, Sandy Talag, Christa Papa; Special participation: Mayor Lito Atienza as Father Mike
TBA	"Dangerous Charade"	Sarah Lahbati: Tina; Enrique Gil: Mark	July 3, 2010
Supporting Cast: Eva Darren, Dexter Doria, Tess Bomb; Special participation: Mayor Lito Atienza as Father Mat
TBA	"Queen of my Heart"	Kris Bernal: Ria; Dino Imperial: Mon	July 10, 2010
Supporting Cast: Marithez Samson, Monica Eribal; Special participation: Mayor Lito Atienza as Uncle Ben
TBA	"Out to Fit"	Meg Imperial: Max; Joseph Bitangcol: Thor	September 11, 2010
Supporting Cast: Aifha Medina, Vincent de Jesus; Special participation: Mayor Lito Atienza as Father Mat
TBA	"The Truth and Nothing But"	Sarah Lahbati: Belle; Dino Imperial: Hans	October 9, 2010
Supporting Cast: Bong Regala, Marithez Samson, Lui Manansala; Special participation: Mayor Lito Atienza as Manong Fidel
TBA	"Makinig Ka, Puso"	Bela Padilla: Iza; Xian Lim: Marc	October 23, 2010
Supporting Cast: Chariz Solomon, Justin Rosana; Special participation: Mayor Lito Atienza as Mr. Anson
TBA	"Step Yes, Step No"	Barbie Forteza: Carly; Joshua Dionisio: Boks	November 20, 2010
Supporting Cast: Angel Estrada, John Medina; Special participation: Mayor Lito Atienza as Tito Aloy
TBA	"The New Girl"	Lexi Fernandez: Sandy; Sef Cadayona: Sam; Kristofer Martin: Rex	TBA
Supporting Cast: Diva Montelaba, Zeryl Lim

=== 2011 ===
No.	Title	Cast	Original release date
TBA	"The Unfaithful"	Diva Montelaba: Mae; Chris Gutierrez: Ryan	March 26, 2011
Supporting Cast: Yassi Pressman, Erik Martinez; Special participation: Mayor Lito Atienza as Tito Marlo
TBA	"My Sweet Caregiver"	Wynwyn Marquez: Meg; Elmo Magalona: Rain	April 6, 2011
Supporting Cast: Mayton Eugenio, Zyrus Desamparado; Special participation: Mayor Lito Atienza as Uncle Peps
TBA	"Lazy Lily"	Joyce Ching: Lily; Kristofer Martin: Luis	May 7, 2011
Supporting Cast: Joy Viado, Liza Ranillo; Special participation: Mayor Lito Atienza as Uncle Pids
TBA	"Love's Priority"	Bela Padilla: Lea; Neil Coleta: Mark	May 21, 2011
Supporting Cast: John Feir, Kalila Aguilos, Carlo Lacana; Special participation: Mayor Lito Atienza as Ninong Quintin
TBA	"Aishiteru, I Love You"	Meg Imperial: Faye; Aki Torio: Jiro	June 25, 2011
Supporting Cast: Marithez Samson, Rhen Escaño, Darren Lim; Special participation: Mayor Lito Atienza as Ninong Miguel
TBA	"Hanging On"	Diva Montelaba: Miles; Kevin Santos: Joaqui	July 9, 2011
Supporting Cast: Tia Pusit, Zyrus Desamparado, Czarina Suzara; Special participation: Mayor Lito Atienza as Uncle Mac
TBA	"Girl Name...Faith"	Tricia Santos: Faith; Ivan Dorschner: Ace	July 16, 2011
Supporting Cast: Mon Confiado, Nene Tamayo; Special participation: Mayor Lito Atienza as Uncle Mon
TBA	"Kaninong Puso"	Julie Anne San Jose: Jade; John Miguel: Baste	July 23, 2011
Supporting Cast: Lovely Rivero, Lui Manansala
TBA	"Loving Your Own"	Devon Seron: Olga; James Reid: Alvin	July 30, 2011
Supporting Cast: Gene Padilla, Sandy Talag; Special participation: Mayor Lito Atienza as Julio
TBA	"Young Love in Trouble"	Joyce Ching: Joy; Derrick Monasterio: Ron	August 20, 2011
Supporting Cast: Dang Amistad, Danniel Deramayo; Special participation: Mayor Lito Atienza as Uncle Mon
TBA	"Takot sa Puso"	Julie Anne San Jose: Kim; Elmo Magalona: Santi	October 1, 2011
Supporting Cast: Cacai Bautista; Special participation: Mayor Lito Atienza as Ninong Eddie
TBA	"Queen's Secret"	Tricia Santos: Angie; Ivan Dorschner: Mat	October 8, 2011
Supporting Cast: Ann Li, Kyra Custodio; Special participation: Mayor Lito Atienza as Tito Dan
TBA	"Her Perfect Match"	Shy Carlos: Bea; AJ Muhlach: Tim	October 15, 2011
Supporting Cast: Joe Vargas, Czarina Suzara
TBA	"Officially Yours"	Joyce Ching: Kate; Kristofer Martin: Eric	November 26, 2011
Supporting Cast: Zeryl Lim, Yong Gopez; Special participation: Mayor Lito Atienza as Tatay Luis
TBA	"Misa de Gallo"	Coleen Garcia: Jean; Albie Casiño: Mart	December 17, 2011
Supporting Cast: Rhen Escano, Kenneth Paul Salva; Special participation: Mayor Lito Atienza as Uncle Joey

=== 2012 ===
No.	Title	Cast	Original release date
TBA	"Sweethearts for Life"	Meg Imperial: Gladys; Teejay Marquez: Kyle	February 4, 2012
Supporting Cast: Shy Carlos, Mara Alberto; Special participation: Mayor Lito Atienza as Mang Diego
TBA	"First Lady"	Lexi Fernandez: Leah; Ivan Dorschner: Mico	February 18, 2012
Supporting Cast: Jhoana Marie Tan; Special participation: Mayor Lito Atienza as Dan
TBA	"Balik-Puso"	Joyce Ching: Cheska; Kristofer Martin: Carlo	March 3, 2012
Supporting Cast: Joy Viado, Dang Amistad; Special participation: Mayor Lito Atienza as Mang Diego
TBA	"True As Gold"	Barbie Forteza: Mira; Joshua Dionisio: Carlo	March 17, 2012
Supporting Cast: Dianne Medina, Gabbi Garcia; Special participation: Mayor Lito Atienza as Tito Billy
TBA	"Love's Best Policy"	Diva Montelaba: Isabelle; Dino Imperial: Carlo	May 12, 2012
Supporting Cast: Yassi Pressman; Special participation: Mayor Lito Atienza as Mang Rey
TBA	"Biyaheng Puso"	Bea Binene: Cora; Jake Vargas: Ed	May 26, 2012
Supporting Cast: Rhen Escaño, Aifha Medina; Special participation: Mayor Lito Atienza as Mang Luis
TBA	"Time for Love"	Lexi Fernandez: Pia; Kristofer Martin: Troy	June 2, 2012
Supporting Cast: Imee Hart, Josh Padilla; Special participation: Mayor Lito Atienza as Mang Bert
TBA	"Mr. Right"	Akiko Solon: Rissa; Arjo Atayde: Alvin	June 16, 2012
Supporting Cast: Tess Bomb, Czarina Suzara, Eduard Duallo, Yexel Sebastian; Special participation: Mayor Lito Atienza as Mang Elias
TBA	"Pangarap na Puso"	TBA	June 30, 2012
Supporting Cast: Special participation: Mayor Lito Atienza as ?
TBA	"Bet Kita"	Barbie Forteza: Pam; Ivan Dorschner: Alex	July 14, 2012
Supporting Cast: Miggs Cuaderno, Liz Alindogan; Special participation: Mayor Lito Atienza as Mang Fernan
TBA	"Heart at Stake"	Linn Oeymo: Marisa; Jaco Benin: Kevin	August 11, 2012
Supporting Cast: Yexel Sebastian, Eduard Duallo, Katrina Medina; Special participation: Mayor Lito Atienza as Miguel
TBA	"My Heart's Keeper"	Sheena Halili: Janet; Enzo Pineda: Elmer	September 15, 2012
Supporting Cast: Zeryl Lim, Lirah Bermudez, Michael Pangilinan; Special participation: Mayor Lito Atienza as Levy
TBA	"Priorities ng Puso"	Gene Padilla: Ricardo; Sofia Andres: Mariz	September 22, 2012
Supporting Cast: Arvic Rivero, Chienna Filomeno; Special participation: Mayor Lito Atienza as Mr. Delos Santos
TBA	"Oh Boy, She's My Girl"	Sandy Talag: Sabrina; Julian Trono: Julian	November 3, 2012
Supporting Cast: TBA
TBA	"Heart of Mine"	Joyce Ching: Aimee; Kristofer Martin: Matt; Yassi Pressman: Gemma	November 10, 2012
Supporting Cast: Meg Imperial; Special participation: Mayor Lito Atienza as Eddie
TBA	"Too Young to Be in Love"	Nina Jose: Ms. Nimfa; BJ Forbes: Nathan	November 17, 2012
Supporting Cast: Lianne Valentin, Jerould Aceron, Marnie Lapus; Special participation: Mayor Lito Atienza as Uncle Mike
TBA	"Bossing ng Puso"	Louise delos Reyes: TBA; Enzo Pineda: TBA	November 24, 2012
Supporting Cast: TBA
TBA	"Dangerous Charade"	Sarah Lahbati: Tina; Enrique Gil: Mark	December 8, 2012
Supporting Cast: Eva Darren, Dexter Doria, Tessbomb; Special participation: Miguel Aguila
TBA	"Love Express"	Barbie Forteza: TBA; Derrick Monasterio: Ben	December 15, 2012
Supporting Cast: TBA
TBA	"My Christmas Wish..."	Alden Richards: Marky; Imee Hart: Wizzy	December 22, 2012
Supporting Cast: Kim Komatsu, Bong Regala, Shermaine Santiago; Special participation: Mayor Lito Atienza as Father Ferdie
TBA	"Perfect Someone"	Bea Binene: Lily; Mikoy Morales: John	December 29, 2012
Supporting Cast: JaMich

=== 2013 ===
No.	Title	Cast	Original release date
1	"Tunay na Pag-ibig"	Julie Anne San Jose: Paula; Alden Richards: Jason	January 5, 2013
Supporting Cast: Jan Manual, Marnie Lapus; Special participation: Mayor Lito Atienza as Mr. Morales
2	"Sayaw ng Puso"	Jam Sebastian: Mario; Michelle Liggayu: Lena	January 12, 2013
Supporting Cast: Carl Guevara, Eian Rances, Yexel Sebastian
3	"Wait for Love"	Joyce Ching: Melinda; Derrick Monasterio: Paul	January 19, 2013
Supporting Cast: Elle Villanueva
4	"Love in Silent Mode"	Enzo Pineda: Melo; Devon Seron: Gelli	January 26, 2013
Supporting Cast: Bret Jackson II, Josef Elizalde; Special participation: Mayor Lito Atienza as Mr. Reyes
5	"Love in the Rebound"	Yassi Pressman: Kate; Phytos Ramirez: John Rex Santiago	February 2, 2013
Supporting Cast: Rabiya Mateo, Dianne Magbanua
6	"Open Your Heart"	Louise delos Reyes: Amalia; Ken Chan: Boni	February 9, 2013
Supporting Cast: Don Umali
7	"My Tropa, My Tru-Lab"	Francis Magundayao: Elmo; Daniella Amable: Ysabel	February 16, 2013
Supporting Cast: Sofia Pablo, Maey Bautista, Kimberly Faye Fulgar, Hershey Garcia
8	"Love Thy Neighbor"	Sofia Andres: Gillian; Alec Robles: Moymoy	February 23, 2013
Supporting Cast: Carl Acosta
9	"Winner sa Puso"	Krystal Reyes: Beth; Renz Valerio: Kaloy	March 2, 2013
Supporting Cast: Miggy Jimenez, Stella Galura
10	"My Gimik Girl"	Shy Carlos: Lily; Teejay Marquez: Pocholo	March 9, 2013
Supporting Cast: Leandro Baldemor, Alchris Baculfo
11	"Best Bet ng Puso"	Julian Trono: Carlo; Bianca Umali: Sandy	March 16, 2013
Supporting Cast: Kimpoy Feliciano
12	"Trust in Love"	Barbie Forteza: Sally; Derrick Monasterio: Paul	March 23, 2013
Supporting Cast: Elle Villanueva
13	"One Summer Love"	Steven Silva: Kags; Diva Montelaba: Euleen	April 6, 2013
Supporting Cast: Helga Krapf
14	"Txtm8, Luvm8"	Bea Binene: Sheiden; Jake Vargas: Tonix	April 13, 2013
Supporting Cast: Will Ashley, Andre Paras
15	"Second Chances"	Yassi Pressman: Kathy; Ken Chan: Marco	April 20, 2013
Supporting Cast: Mico Aytona
16	"Lifeguard, Loveguard"	Rodjun Cruz: Jason	April 27, 2013
Supporting Cast: Jan Manual, Anthony Rosaldo, Rhea Nakpil, Yexel Sebastian
17	"Faith in Love"	Ruru Madrid: Mark	May 4, 2013
Supporting Cast: Isabelle de Leon, Gil Cuerva, Earl Gatdula
18	"Love and Play"	Mike Tan: Justin; Frencheska Farr: Marco	May 11, 2013
Supporting Cast: Tess Bomb, Gilleth Sandico
19	"My Dream Guy"	Kristofer Martin: Brent; Lexi Fernandez: Yarah	May 18, 2013
Supporting Cast: JV Suzara
20	"Coffee Princess"	Steven Silva: Rigor; Diva Montelaba: Vivian	May 25, 2013
Supporting Cast: Justin Rosana, Jak Roberto
21	"Room For Love"	Alden Richards: Aldo; Barbie Forteza: Geri	June 1, 2013
Supporting Cast: Dang Amistad, Tess Bomb, Bianca Santiago, Lumeng Medrano, Zackael Uy
22	"Love by an Angel"	Barbie Forteza: Moira; Ruru Madrid: Julius	June 8, 2013
Supporting Cast: Milkcah Wynne Nacion, Jerould Aceron
23	"Prinsesa ng Pag-ibig"	Barbie Forteza: Prince/Princess; Jake Vargas: King	June 15, 2013
Supporting Cast: Gene Padilla, Chinggay Riego, Yasser Marta
24	"Tibok at First Sight"	Barbie Forteza: Abby; Aljur Abrenica: Mark	June 22, 2013
Supporting Cast: Christine Joy Velasco, Marnie Lapus, Darlon Castor
25	"Kambal na Pag-ibig"	Kris Bernal: Sonia; Carl Guevara: Marvin	July 6, 2013
Supporting Cast: Angela Alarcon, Analyn Barro, Miggy Tolentino
26	"Ansabe ng Puso"	Kris Bernal: Cristy; Mike Tan: Maximo	July 13, 2013
Supporting Cast: Kelley Day, Rabiya Mateo
27	"Moving on with My Heart"	Kris Bernal: Shaira; Alden Richards: Gian	July 20, 2013
Supporting Cast: Elle Villanueva
28	"Love Eternally"	Kris Bernal: Tori; Aljur Abrenica: Paulo	July 27, 2013
Supporting Cast: Josh Clement Eugenio, Dianne Hernandez
29	"Na-Sight na Heart"	Louise delos Reyes: Lovely; Enzo Pineda: Gino	August 3, 2013
Supporting Cast: Angel Satsumi, Jenzel Angeles
30	"Ekstra Special"	Louise delos Reyes: Desiree; Rocco Nacino: Jordan	August 10, 2013
Supporting Cast: Ana Luna, Leslie Landicho
31	"My Bespren, My Love"	Louise delos Reyes: Dessa; Ken Chan: Beaver	August 17, 2013
Supporting Cast: Aki Torio, Bong Regala, Akeem Aldover
32	"Love Vibes"	Louise delos Reyes: Vanessa; Kristofer Martin: Garreth	August 24, 2013
Supporting Cast: Sandy Budol, Matt Lozano, Sanya Lopez
33	"Hate You, Love You"	Julie Anne San Jose: Danica; Jeric Gonzales: Mauro	September 7, 2013
Supporting Cast: Justin Rosana
34	"Music and Miracles"	Julie Anne San Jose: Sarih; Jake Vargas: Anton	September 14, 2013
Supporting Cast: Lui Manansala, CJ Almazar; Special participation: Mayor Lito Atienza as Mr. Reyes
35	"One Pure Love"	Julie Anne San Jose: Nhinay; Benjamin Alves: Ejay	September 21, 2013
Supporting Cast: Dianne Medina, Cherry Madrigal, Bryan Benedict
36	"Haunted House of Love"	Julie Anne San Jose: Mellah; Mark Herras: Dax	September 28, 2013
Supporting Cast: Lilia Cuntapay, Christine Joy Velasco, Butch Raymundo, Darlon Castor, Marc Rei Paran
37	"Playful Hearts"	Kristofer Martin: Daniel; Lexi Fernandez: Susan	October 5, 2013
Supporting Cast: Gil Cuerva, Arvic Rivero
38	"Pusong Mapagpanggap"	Kristofer Martin: Brick; Kim Rodriguez: Sassy	October 12, 2013
Supporting Cast: Ganiel Krishnan, Jak Roberto
39	"My Brother's Lover"	Kristofer Martin: Allen; Barbie Forteza: Jenny; Hiro Peralta: Ken	October 19, 2013
Supporting Cast: Karen Timbol, Yasser Marta
40	"Magkaibang Mundo"	Kristofer Martin: Melvin; Bea Binene: Eloisa	October 26, 2013
Supporting Cast: JV Suzara, Ana Gonzalez
41	"Language of Love"	Ken Chan: Michael; Krystal Reyes: Shane	November 9, 2013
Supporting Cast: Liza Ranillo, Dale Rossly
42	"Bad Boy, Good Heart"	Ken Chan: Owen; Thea Tolentino: Rejji	November 16, 2013
Supporting Cast: Jan Manual, Arkin del Rosario, Dianne Chulani
43	"Forget Me Not"	Ken Chan: Alden; Kim Rodriguez: Justine	November 23, 2013
Supporting Cast: Marithez Samson, Rhen Escano
44	"Heart of Trust"	Ken Chan: Adrian; Joyce Ching: Mika	November 30, 2013
Supporting Cast: Buboy Villar
45	"Recipe for Love"	Bea Binene: Ayen; Jeric Gonzales: Elmo	December 7, 2013
Supporting Cast: Arny Ross, Kate Lapuz
46	"Kasunduan ng Puso"	Bea Binene: Cresta; Andre Paras: Andrei; Mikoy Morales: Matthew	December 14, 2013
Supporting Cast: Jay Arcilla, Janet Diaz, Rowena Cordona
47	"My White Christmas"	Bea Binene: Miley; Lucho Ayala: Nato	December 21, 2013
Supporting Cast: Lianne Valentino, Arlene Tolibas
48	"Bagong Taon, Bagong Puso"	Bea Binene: Claring; Jake Vargas: Lucky	December 28, 2013
Supporting Cast: Marc Justine Alvarez, Emmanuel Raymundo; Special participation: Mayor Lito Atienza as Mr. Reyes

=== 2014 ===
No.	Title	Cast	Original release date
1	"I Love You, My Family"	Jillian Ward: Diana; Vincent Magbanua: Kenneth; Mona Louise Rey: Alice	January 4, 2014
Supporting Cast: Joaqui Tupas, Joy Viado
2	"Spirit of the Heart"	Barbie Forteza: Carrie; Ruru Madrid: Migz	January 11, 2014
Supporting Cast: Jak Roberto, Marnie Lapus, Liezel Lopez, Rob Gomez
3	"Love Radar"	Julie Anne San Jose: Cozy; Enzo Pineda: Aldo	January 18, 2014
Supporting Cast: Lloyd Abella, Bekimon
4	"R U RDY 4 LUV? (Are You Ready for Love?)"	Louise delos Reyes: Leen; Carl Guevarra: Dave	January 25, 2014
Supporting Cast: Milkcah Wayne Nacion, Tess Bomb
5	"GF for Rent"	Jake Vargas: Kenjie; Kim Rodriguez: Anya	February 1, 2014
Supporting Cast: Yexel Sebastian
6	"Love Pretends"	Jake Vargas: Reggie; Barbie Forteza: Carla	February 8, 2014
Supporting Cast: Len-Len Frial
7	"Lessons in Love"	Jake Vargas: Michael; Kris Bernal: Kelly	February 15, 2014
Supporting Cast: Eian Rances
8	"Scared to Love"	Jake Vargas: Migo; Louise delos Reyes: Fiona	February 22, 2014
Supporting Cast: Carl Acosta, Debraliz Valasote
9	"Biyaheng Puso"	Jake Vargas: Ed; Bea Binene: Cora	March 1, 2014
Supporting Cast: Rhen Escano, Aifha Medina; Special participation: Mayor Lito Atienza as Mang Luis
10	"No Endings"	Derrick Monasterio: Roma	March 8, 2014
Supporting Cast: Lauren Young, Jak Roberto
11	"When Love Take a U-Turn"	Derrick Monasterio: Chris; Thea Tolentino: Jessica	March 15, 2014
Supporting Cast: Mel Martinez, Yasser Marta
12	"One Summer Love"	Derrick Monasterio: Edison	March 22, 2014
Supporting Cast: Stephanie Sol, Carl Guevara
13	"Misyon ng Puso"	Thea Tolentino: Morgan; Phytos Ramirez: Jesse	April 5, 2014
Supporting Cast: Eian Rances
14	"Luv U Still"	Thea Tolentino: Alyssa; Kenneth Paul Cruz: Randy	April 12, 2014
Supporting Cast: Tess Bomb
15	"Love Promises"	Thea Tolentino: Melinda; Mikoy Morales: Jack	April 26, 2014
Supporting Cast: Ramon Christopher Gutierrez, Gil Cuerva
16	"Love in Between"	Barbie Forteza: Rachel; Jeric Gonzales: Red	May 3, 2014
Supporting Cast: Liezel Lopez
17	"Mimay Luv"	Barbie Forteza: Sheryl; Hiro Peralta: Kenny	May 10, 2014
Supporting Cast: Jenny Miller, Jak Roberto, Mikee Agustin
18	"One True Heart"	Barbie Forteza: Janine; Ruru Madrid: Gabby	May 24, 2014
Supporting Cast: Rubi Rubi
19	"Queen Of My Heart"	Barbie Forteza: Lauren; Miguel Tanfelix: Martin	May 31, 2014
Supporting Cast: Zandra Summer, Marnie Lupas
20	"Always In Love"	Joyce Ching: Miranda; Kristofer Martin: Miggy	June 7, 2014
Supporting Cast: Mitch Ligayu, Yasser Marta
21	"Of Love & Second Chances"	Joyce Ching: Jenna	June 14, 2014
Supporting Cast: Phytos Ramirez, Rita De Guzman, Lui Manansala, Eian Rances
22	"Haligi ng Tahanan"	Joyce Ching: Kelly; Derrick Monasterio: Aaron	June 21, 2014
Supporting Cast: Tanya Gomez
23	"Torpedo Kong Puso"	Ruru Madrid: Carlo; Jeric Gonzales: Kenneth	July 5, 2014
Supporting Cast: Lexi Fernandez, Jameson Blake
24	"A Love Like You"	Ruru Madrid: Jason; Kim Rodriguez: Penny	July 12, 2014
Supporting Cast: Rhen Escano, JV Suzara
25	"Spirit of the Heart"	Barbie Forteza: Carrie; Ruru Madrid: Migz	July 19, 2014
Supporting Cast: Jak Roberto, Marnie Lapus, Irene Celebre, Liezel Lopez, Rob Gomez
26	"Y.O.L.O. (You Only Love Once)"	Thea Tolentino: Lyra; Ruru Madrid: Christian	July 26, 2014
Supporting Cast: Sanya Lopez, Lance Serrano, Jay Arcilla, Gil Cuerva
27	"M.U."	Kim Rodriguez: Michelle Go; Kristofer Martin: Rowden Go	August 2, 2014
Supporting Cast: Tess Bomb
28	"When Love Revenge"	Kim Rodriguez: Monica; Enzo Pineda: James	August 9, 2014
Supporting Cast: Dianne Medina, Mikee Agustin, Neo Domingo, Prince Clemente
29	"Live in Love"	Kim Rodriguez: Angelica; Jak Roberto: Jimbo	August 30, 2014
Supporting Cast: Helga Krapf, Patrick Sugui
30	"Papa's Girl"	Krystal Reyes: Erika; Julian Trono: Benjo	September 13, 2014
Supporting Cast: Milkcah Wynne Nacion, John Feir, Shermaine Bautista, Brent Valdez
31	"Two Hearts, One Love"	Max Collins: Jill Ventana; Carl Guevara: Michael Ventana	September 20, 2014
Supporting Cast: Stephanie Sol, Arianne Bautista, RJ Agustin
32	"You're Beautiful"	Charee Pineda: Julia Cruz; Phytos Ramirez: Gerald Reyes	September 27, 2014
Supporting Cast: Len-Len Frial, Miggs Cuaderno
33	"Bet ko si Beki"	Empress Schuck: Alyssa; Kristofer Martin: Jeromie	October 4, 2014
Supporting Cast: Kyra Rivera, Gil Cuerva
34	"He's The One"	Ryza Cenon: Kristine; Steven Silva: Justin	October 11, 2014
Supporting Cast: Lance Serrano, KD Rossly, Yasser Marta
35	"One Proud Love"	Nadine Samonte: Max; Mark Herras: Calvin	October 18, 2014
Supporting Cast: Mikee Agustin, TJ Valderama
36	"Waland Duda, Ikaw Na!"	Rodjun Cruz: Rainier; Gwen Zamora: Clarissa	October 25, 2014
Supporting Cast: Kyle Ocampo, Elle Ramirez, Mikee Quintos
37	"From Here and Beyond"	Louise delos Reyes: Lauren; Derrick Monasterio: Kenny	November 1, 2014
Supporting Cast: Annika Camaya, Bryan Olano, Lharby Policarpio
38	"DIY: Happy Ending"	Gabbi Garcia: Ashley Perry; Ruru Madrid: Mickey Perry	November 8, 2014
Supporting Cast: Tina Paner, Ramon Christopher Gutierrez, Rob Gomez
39	"My Sister's Lover"	Thea Tolentino: Jessica; Kiko Estrada: Rico	November 15, 2014
Supporting Cast: Coleen Perez, Marnie Lapuz, Buboy Villar
40	"Number One Fan"	Sandy Talag: Janine; Renz Valerio: Colin	November 22, 2014
Supporting Cast: Lianne Valentino, Jay Arcilla, Prince Clemente
41	"If I Let You Go"	Bela Padilla: Morgan Balmores; Martin del Rosario: Victor Balmores	November 29, 2014
Supporting Cast: Justin Rosana, Bong Regala
42	"Lovelier the Second Time"	Joyce Ching: Allison; Juancho Trivino: Rico	December 6, 2014
Supporting Cast: Sanya Lopez, KD Rossly, Liezel Lopez
43	"Byuti & the Best"	Jackie Rice: Jenny; Ken Chan: Rowden	December 13, 2014
Supporting Cast: Joy Viado, Rubi-Rubi, Myka Flores
44	"Lonely Hearts Club"	Kim Rodriguez: Catherine; Derrick Monasterio: Jonny	December 20, 2014
Supporting Cast: David Remo, Eva Darren
45	"New Year, New Me"	Charee Pineda: Mika; Jak Roberto: Kevin	December 27, 2014
Supporting Cast: Mikee Agustin, Milkcah Wynne Nacion

=== 2015 ===
No.	Title	Cast	Original release date
1	"Second Princess"	Krystal Reyes: Faith; Julian Trono: Joshua	January 3, 2015
Supporting Cast: Mariel Pamintuan
2	"Finding Mr. Right"	Barbie Forteza: Marivic; Ken Chan: Charles	January 10, 2015
Supporting Cast: Neil Perez, Rhen Escano, Tess Bomb
3	"My Rebel Heart"	Ruru Madrid: Derrick; Thea Tolentino: Trina	January 24, 2015
Supporting Cast: Marc Justine Alvarez, Mikee Quintos
4	"Totoy's True Lab"	Katrina Halili: Leslie	January 31, 2015
Supporting Cast: BJ Forbes, Gil Cuerva
5	"Proxy Love"	Glaiza de Castro: Josilda; Mike Tan: Rommel	February 7, 2015
Supporting Cast: Aifha Medina, Vince Velasco
6	"My Angel, My Valentines"	Andre Paras: Ikot	February 14, 2015
Supporting Cast: Cai Cortez, Jhai Ho, Lance Serrano
7	"Girly Girl"	Kristofer Martin: Caloy; Joyce Ching: Alex	February 21, 2015
Supporting Cast: Dale Rossly
8	"YOLO si LOLA"	Jeric Gonzales: Moymoy; Jhoana Marie Tan: Trixie	February 28, 2015
Supporting Cast: Lou Veloso, Pilita Corrales
9	"Magpakatotoo ka, teh!"	Kylie Padilla: Jenna; Phytos Ramirez: Luigi	March 7, 2015
Supporting Cast: Francine Garcia
10	"Love is Gold"	Benjamin Alves: Blanco; LJ Reyes: Phoebe; Diva Montelaba: Ellen	March 14, 2015
Supporting Cast: Annette Samin
11	"Moments In Time"	Derrick Monasterio: Jimboy; Jazz Ocampo: Eliza; Prince Villanueva: Rico	March 21, 2015
Supporting Cast: Annika Kamaya, Abel Estanislao
12	"Sweet Summer Love"	Kiko Estrada: Kyle; Gabbi Garcia: Mila	March 28, 2015
Supporting Cast: Stephanie Sol, Jak Roberto, Yasser Marta, Rob Gomez
13	"My Imported GF"	Rodjun Cruz: Rainier; Max Collins: Caitlin	April 11, 2015
Supporting Cast: Miggs Cuaderno, Gil Cuerva
14	"Strict ang Tutor Ko"	Bobby Andrews: Dante; Ashley Ortega: Nida	April 18, 2015
Supporting Cast: Shermaine Santiago
15	"Love by Blood"	Jake Vargas: Jeric; Mayton Eugenio: Roxanne	April 25, 2015
Supporting Cast: Epi Quizon
16	"Social Media Lovers"	Louise delos Reyes: Mona; Pancho Magno: Archie	May 2, 2015
Supporting Cast: Karen delos Reyes
17	"Unexpected Love Boarder"	Gwen Zamora: Sheena; Enzo Pineda: Mark; Alden Richards: Ambo	May 9, 2015
Supporting Cast: Gerald Madrid
18	"Happily Ever After"	Aljur Abrenica: Raymond	May 16, 2015
Supporting Cast: Sanya Lopez, Lovely Rivero, Mon Confiado, Lenlen Frial
19	"Nobody's Princess"	Julie Anne San Jose: Cynthia; Ken Chan: Jerry	May 23, 2015
Supporting Cast: Perla Bautista
20	"Hugot Pa More"	Kenneth Paul Cruz: Derek; Thea Tolentino: Nicole; Lucho Ayala: Jomar	May 30, 2015
Supporting Cast: Lance Serrano, Jaclyn Jose, Mikee Quintos
21	"Sisters for Life"	Ryza Cenon: Miranda; Rich Asuncion: Sarah	June 6, 2015
Supporting Cast: Vince Velasco
22	"Signs of Love"	Krystal Reyes: Girlie; Julian Trono: Jason; Prince Villanueva: Patrick	June 13, 2015
Supporting Cast: Juan Rodrigo
23	"Status: It's Complicated"	Barbie Forteza: Janice; James Wright: Gabby	June 20, 2015
Supporting Cast: Dale Rossly, Tina Paner
24	"Edi Wow"	Sef Cadayona: Dave; Ashley Ortega: Britney	June 27, 2015
Supporting Cast: Jazz Ocampo, Juancho Triviño
25	"Type Kita, Type Mo Ay Iba"	Bianca Umali: Cheska; Miguel Tanfelix: Brandon; Miggy Jimenez: Kenneth	July 4, 2015
Supporting Cast: Nicole Dulalia
26	"My Mother, My Yaya"	Kim Rodriguez: Rina; Hiro Peralta: Vince	July 11, 2015
Supporting Cast: Ynez Veneracion, Shiela Rodriguez, Kimberly Fulgar, Marnie Lapus
27	"Copy Cat Love"	Kris Bernal: Helena; Phytos Ramirez: Randy	July 18, 2015
Supporting Cast: Arianne Bautista, Coleen Perez, Gil Cuerva
28	"Twist of Fate"	Sheena Halili: Lea	July 25, 2015
Supporting Cast: Victor Basa, Rhen Escano, Sancho Delas Alas, Joshen Bernardo
29	"Flowers 4 U"	Jeric Gonzales: Alvin	August 1, 2015
Supporting Cast: Isabella de Leon, Eunice Lagusad
30	"Once Upon a Love Story"	Gabbi Garcia: Lian	August 8, 2015
Supporting Cast: Gabriel de Leon
31	"Substitute for Love"	Jackie Rice: Nina	August 15, 2015
Supporting Cast: Ervic Vijandre, Diva Montelaba, Franco Lagusad
32	"Lola Madonna"	Ruru Madrid: Joel	August 22, 2015
Supporting Cast: Jazz Ocampo, Gloria Sevilla, Mikee Quintos, Jhai Ho
33	"Love Vs. Dreams"	Frencheska Farr: Angely; Rodjun Cruz: Dendo	August 29, 2015
Supporting Cast: Yasser Marta, Rob Gomez
34	"Finding Faith"	Kristofer Martin: Rolly	September 5, 2015
Supporting Cast: Jhoana Marie Tan, Annika Kamaya
35	"My Bodyguard"	Janine Gutierrez: Annie; Elmo Magalona: Raul	September 12, 2015
Supporting Cast: Ken Alfonso, Marika Sasaki, KD Rossly
36	"Love Wins"	Bianca Umali: Meg; Miguel Tanfelix: Tim	September 19, 2015
Supporting Cast: Kevin Santos
37	"Dead na Dead Sa'yo"	Kris Bernal: Sam; Aljur Abrenica: Popoy	September 26, 2015
Supporting Cast: Tess Bomb
38	"My Absentee Mom"	Kristofer Martin: Maximo; Joyce Ching: Ayla	October 3, 2015
Supporting Cast: Lander Vera Perez, Andrea del Rosario, Elle Ramirez, Gil Cuerva
39	"Room For Love"	Alden Richards: Aldo; Barbie Forteza: Geri	October 10, 2015
Supporting Cast: Dang Amistad, Tess Bomb, Bianca Santiago, Lumeng Medrano, Zackael Uy
40	"Ganti ng Api"	Thea Tolentino: Ella	October 17, 2015
Supporting Cast: Jak Roberto
41	"Felingera na, Assumera Pa"	Kim Rodriguez: Ericka; Kiko Estrada: Wendel	October 24, 2015
Supporting Cast: Lance Serrano, Karen Atendido, Marika Sasaki, Mikee Quintos, Yna Uy
42	"Once a Princess"	Max Collins: Julie; Sef Cadayona: Nanding	November 7, 2015
Supporting Cast: Stephanie Sol, Miggs Cuaderno, Bong Regala
43	"Sikretong Malupit"	Kylie Padilla: Katrina; Martin del Rosario: Marco; Denise Barbacena: Sandra	November 14, 2015
Supporting Cast: Aaron Yanga, Yasser Marta
44	"No U-Turn"	Rochelle Pangilinan: Jasmine	November 21, 2015
Supporting Cast: Bodie Cruz, Marnie Lapus, Bryan Benedict
45	"Mahal Nga Kasi Kita"	Gabbi Garcia: Janine; Jeric Gonzales: Arlan	November 28, 2015
Supporting Cast: Mariel Pamintuan
46	"Bilanggo ng Kahapon"	Ken Chan: Jerry; Jazz Ocampo: Phoebe	December 5, 2015
Supporting Cast: Kier Legaspi, Tina Paner
47	"Can You Read My Heart"	Bea Binene: Carol; Derrick Monasterio: Emil	December 12, 2015
Supporting Cast: Kenneth Paul Cruz, David Remo, Rob Gomez
48	"Sa Ngalan ng Ina"	Ruru Madrid: Leeno; Ashley Ortega: Shayne	December 19, 2015
Supporting Cast: Annette Samin
49	"Christmas In My Heart"	Kris Bernal: Milda; Hiro Peralta: Chino	December 26, 2015
Supporting Cast: Rhen Escano

=== 2016 ===
No.	Title	Cast	Original release date
1	"Love Your Enemy"	Sanya Lopez: Mira; Phytos Ramirez: Andrew	January 9, 2016
Supporting Cast: KD Rossly
2	"Romeo & Juliet"	Joyce Ching: Juliet; Enzo Pineda: Romeo	January 16, 2016
Supporting Cast: Kyle Ocampo, Eunice Lagusad
3	"Ikaw Pa Rin"	Kristofer Martin: Rowell; Kim Rodriguez: Sophie	January 23, 2016
Supporting Cast: Joshua Uy
4	"Lovely Revenge"	Jeric Gonzales: Luigi; Klea Pineda: Kristel	January 30, 2016
Supporting Cast: Dale Rossly, Abel Estanislao
5	"Love Prevails"	Thea Tolentino: Phoebe; Mikoy Morales: Jason	February 6, 2016
Supporting Cast: Buboy Villar
6	"Don't Give Up On Us"	Bianca Umali: Anna; Miguel Tanfelix: Jared	February 13, 2016
Supporting Cast: Therese Malvar
7	"All About Space"	Gabbi Garcia: Beverly; Migo Adecer: Norson	February 20, 2016
Supporting Cast: Marnie Lapus
8	"Secret Bratinella"	Jazz Ocampo: Frelyn; Prince Villanueva: Marco	February 27, 2016
Supporting Cast: Tess Bomb, Joko Diaz, Liezel Lopez
9	"Unrequited Love"	Jak Roberto: Ryan; Arra San Agustin: Girlie	March 5, 2016
Supporting Cast: Isabel Granada, Analyn Barro, Karen Atendido
10	"My Classmate"	Ayra Mariano: Lea; Elyson De Dios: Lucky	March 12, 2016
Supporting Cast: Pilita Corrales
11	"Beki Moves"	Isabella de Leon: Prima; Phytos Ramirez: Gibo	March 19, 2016
Supporting Cast: Gerard Pizarras
12	"Fan Mode"	Renz Valerio: Billy	April 2, 2016
Supporting Cast: Ryza Cenon, Miggy Jimenez, Bryan Benedict
13	"Lucky I'm In Love"	Louise delos Reyes: Eunice; Lucho Ayala: Jacob	April 9, 2016
Supporting Cast: Denise Barbacena
14	"Wrong Text"	Jake Vargas: Kent; Ashley Ortega: Maya	April 16, 2016
Supporting Cast: Don Umali, Anna Gonzales, Dakota Dufloth
15	"Single Dad"	Thea Tolentino: Erin; Ken Chan: Dale	April 23, 2016
Supporting Cast: Mike Vergel, Shermaine Santiago, Princess Guevarra, Bryce Eusebio
16	"Turning Japanese"	Marika Sasaki: Akira; Rob Moya: Yushin	May 7, 2016
Supporting Cast: Shamaine Buencamino, Arthur Solinap, Isabella de Leon
17	"Back To Basics"	Klea Pineda: Jammy; Jak Roberto: Anton	May 14, 2016
Supporting Cast: Vincent Magbanua, Kervin Rivas, Gil Cuerva
18	"Sabi Ng Lolo Ko..."	Kristofer Martin: Regent	May 28, 2016
Supporting Cast: Lander Vera Perez, Analyn Barro, Bryan Olano, Noel Trinidad
19	"Love Take Two"	Jeric Gonzales: Tres; Mona Louise Rey: Geneva	June 4, 2016
Supporting Cast: Marlann Flores, Arianne Bautista
20	"Liwanag"	Martin del Rosario: Dale; Koreen Medina: Erika	June 18, 2016
Supporting Cast: David Remo, Marithez Samson, Liza Ranillo
21	"Party Pa More"	Krystal Reyes: Lara; Hiro Peralta: Chase	June 25, 2016
Supporting Cast: Diego Castro, Lovely Rivero, Nicole Dulalia
22	"Once Upon a Fairytale"	Louise delos Reyes: Gelay; Juancho Triviño: Dean	July 2, 2016
Supporting Cast: Arrly Enriquez, Crizelda Roberts
23	"A Mother's Son"	Kristofer Martin: Justin; Joyce Ching: Maya; Lloyd Abella: Greg	July 9, 2016
Supporting Cast: Alma Concepcion, Tina Paner, Carlo San Juan
24	"My Sweet Mistake"	Andrea Torres: Coleen; Mike Tan: James	July 23, 2016
Supporting Cast: Lani Mercado
25	"To Love and To Hope"	Bianca Umali: Hope; Miguel Tanfelix: Josh	July 30, 2016
Supporting Cast: Dave Bornea, Joemarie Nielsen, Arjan Jimenez
26	"My Destiny"	Phytos Ramirez: Carlo; Kim Rodriguez: Lucy	August 6, 2016
Supporting Cast: Jak Roberto, Kelvin Miranda, Gil Cuerva
27	"Karugtong ng Kahapon"	Thea Tolentino: Cherry; Avery Paraiso: Alfred	August 20, 2016
Supporting Cast: Rhen Escano, Lara Morena
28	"My Beki Dad"	Ken Chan: Randolf; Arra San Agustin: Lyanna	August 27, 2016
Supporting Cast: Eian Rances, Kyle Vergara, Sancho Delas Alas
29	"Sakripisyo"	Rocco Nacino: Arby; Sanya Lopez: Sanya	September 10, 2016
Supporting Cast: Dianne Medina, Yuan Francisco, Marilyn Villamayor
30	"Set-Up For Love"	Bea Binene: Arra; Derrick Monasterio: Vermont	September 17, 2016
Supporting Cast: Jahren Estorque, Shermaine Santiago, Rob Gomez
31	"A Father's Fear"	LJ Reyes: Alexandra	September 24, 2016
Supporting Cast: Lance Serrano, John Feir
32	"Plano ng Kapalaran"	Kristofer Martin: Raylie; Joyce Ching: Asha	October 1, 2016
Supporting Cast: Brent Valdez, KD Rossly
33 35	"The Proposal; Bahay-Bahayan; Reconciliation"	Kris Bernal: Lemery; Aljur Abrenica: Sam	October 8, 2016; October 15, 2016; October 22, 2016
Supporting Cast: Carla Valderrama, Chesca Diaz Morales, Tina Paner
36	"Kambal na Pag-ibig"	Yayo Aguila: Marga	November 5, 2016
Supporting Cast: MJ Magno, MM Magno, Hazel Hojilla, Heidi Hojilla
37	"Like and Share"	Kate Valdez: Nikki; Migo Adecer: Clyde	November 12, 2016
Supporting Cast: Eian Rances, Carlo San Juan
38	"Daddy's Girl"	Lindt Johnston: Milen; Dave Bornea: RJ	November 19, 2016
Supporting Cast: Karen Timbol, Kier Legaspi
39 40	"Sana"	Kim Rodriguez: Denise; Jeric Gonzales: Macky; Mikoy Morales: Eric	December 10, 2016
Supporting Cast: Joaqui Tupas, Tess Bomb
41	"Hope for a New Life"	Inah de Belen: Via; Jake Vargas: Lyndon	December 31, 2016
Supporting Cast: Allan Paule, Isabel Pablo, Lester Paul Recirdo, Rob Gomez

=== 2017 ===
No.	Title	Cast	Original release date
1	"My Family's Secret"	Juancho Trivino: Mauro; Klea Pineda: Gracie	January 7, 2017
Supporting Cast: Arpee Bautista, Bong Regala, Shermaine Santiago, Liza Ranillo
2	"New Beginnings"	Thea Tolentino: Lana; Phytos Ramirez: Andre	January 28, 2017
Supporting Cast: Leanne Bautista, Sophia Pablo, Marnie Lapus
3	"Sayaw ng Buhay" (The Charlene Liantada Story)	Jillian Ward: Charlene	February 4, 2017
Supporting Cast: Chromewell Cosio, Kate Lapuz, Yayo Aguila
4	"Magandang Ama" (The Willie Garcia Story)	Bembol Roco: Willie	February 11, 2017
Supporting Cast: Helga Krapf, Jhai Ho, Hiro Peralta
5	"Hindi Tayo..." (The Ms. Beng and Cong. Lito Atienza Story)	Kristofer Martin: Cong. Lito "Jun" Atienza; Joyce Ching: Ms. Beng Atienza	February 18, 2017
Supporting Cast: Denise Barbacena, Sheila Marie Rodriguez, Richard Quan
6	"Chaka and the Bae" (The Neneng Franciloso Story)	Ayra Mariano: Ms. Neneng Franciloso	February 25, 2017
Supporting Cast: Patrick Sugui, Rubi-Rubi, Yasser Marta, Dale Rossly, Isabel Pablo
7	"Ang Nanay ng mga Anghel" (The Nora Balderas Story)	Chynna Ortaleza: Nora	March 4, 2017
Supporting Cast: Cedrick Juan, Kyle Vergara, Upeng Fernandez
8	"Kailan Tama ang Pagmamahal?"	Martin del Rosario: Noel	March 11, 2017
Supporting Cast: Ynez Veneracion, Beatriz Imperial, Cleo Decena, Jenina Primero
9	"My Oversized Love" (The Loren Mae Monares Story)	Cai Cortez: Loren	March 18, 2017
Supporting Cast: Fabio Ide, Diva Montelaba
10	"Scent of Love" (The Corazon Saguid Story)	Louise delos Reyes: Cora	March 25, 2017
Supporting Cast: Lucho Ayala, Eva Darren
11	"Batang Ina" (The Rose Ann Medina Story)	Kim Rodriguez: Rose	April 1, 2017
Supporting Cast: James Teng, Marithez Samson, Lander Vera Perez
12	"My Goodbye Girl" (The Elma Garon-Tolentino Story)	Isabelle de Leon: Elma	April 8, 2017
Supporting Cast: Jeric Gonzales, Eunice Lagusad
13	"The Perfect Pair" (The Jon Avila Story)	Andre Paras: Jon	April 22, 2017
Supporting Cast: Koreen Medina, Tess Bomb, Alma Concepcion, Vince Maristela
14	"Suntok Sa Buwan" (The Jonison Fontanos Story)	Kevin Santos: Jonison "Joni" Fontanos	May 6, 2017
Supporting Cast: Stephanie Sol, Liezel Lopez, Joko Diaz
15	"Bangungot ng Kahapon" (The Carmen Raga Story)	Joyce Ching: Carmen	May 13, 2017
Supporting Cast: Mon Confiado, Mark Vergel, Lui Manansala
16	"Criteria Girl" (The Nora Estiva Story)	Sheena Halili: Nora	May 20, 2017
Supporting Cast: Denise Barbacena, Boy2 Quizon
17	"Life Is Beautiful" (The Princess and Bong Villaverde Story)	Dianne Medina: Princess; Rodjun Cruz: Bong	May 27, 2017
Supporting Cast: Pauline Mendoza, Elle Chua
18	"Ganti ng Anak" (The Vilma Samia Story)	Empress Schuck: Vilma	June 10, 2017
Supporting Cast: Lance Serrano, Ralph Noriega, Marika Sasaki, Lovely Rivero
19	"Graduate na si Lola" (The Salvacion Nacario Story)	Rita Daniela: Rosie; Ruby Ruiz as Lola Sally	June 17, 2017
Supporting Cast: Rob Moya
20	"Love is not Blind" (The Josefina Olorocisimo Story)	Thea Tolentino: Josefina	June 24, 2017
Supporting Cast: Jay Arcilla, Rob Gomez, Lharby Policarpio, Gileth Sandico
21	"I'm in Love with my Stalker" (The Aileen Bernardo Story)	Kate Valdez: Aileen; Elyson de Dios: Jeffer	July 8, 2017
Supporting Cast: Ameera Johara, Zach Castañeda
22	"Rebound Girl" (The Lilibeth Malabanan Story)	Klea Pineda: Lilibeth; Migo Adecer: Roiland	July 15, 2017
Supporting Cast: Faith Da Silva, Bong Regala
23	"Prodigal Daughter" (The Anne Dela Cruz-Gonzaga Story)	Jackie Rice: Anne	July 22, 2017
Supporting Cast: Danna Garcel, Debbie Garcia, Jay Garcia, Bryan Benedict, Don Umali
24	"Young Love, Sweet Love" (The Mary Lagasca-Catalma Story)	Arra San Agustin: Mary Lagasca; Jeric Gonzales: June Lagasca	August 5, 2017
Supporting Cast: Prince Villanueva, Julius Miguel, Arny Ross, Vince Maristela
25	"This Girl's In Love With You, Beshie" (The Kristel Malate Story)	Joyce Ching: Kristel; Kristofer Martin: Adam	August 12, 2017
Supporting Cast: Princess Guevarra, Isabel Pablo
26	"Love Hurts" (The Bea Vega Story)	Andrea Torres: Bea	August 19, 2017
Supporting Cast: Ervic Vijandre, Mara Alberto
27	"Opposites Attract" (The Elisa and JM Enriquez Story)	Kim Rodriguez: Elisa Enriquez; Phytos Ramirez: JM Enriquez	September 2, 2017
Supporting Cast: Carl Cervantes, Mike Magat
28	"Accidental Love Story" (The Maricris Mercado Story)	Isabelle de Leon: Crissie; Jak Roberto: Jhay	September 9, 2017
Supporting Cast: Rhen Escaño, Joemarie Nielsen
29	"Boyfriend for Hire" (The Leovie Wang Story)	Ayra Mariano: Leovie; Bruno Gabriel: Billy	September 16, 2017
Supporting Cast: Yasser Marta, Marithez Samson
30	"Love Plus Two" (The Diza Escora-Asejo Story)	Sheena Halili: Diza; Juancho Trivino: Arvin	September 23, 2017
Supporting Cast: Leanne Bautista, Gavin Soriano, Delio Socito, Liza Ranillo
31	"The Wrong Mr. Right" (The Mileth "Lelet" Pagcaliwagan Story)	Jazz Ocampo: Lelet; Hiro Peralta: Nante	September 30, 2017
Supporting Cast: Kelvin Miranda, Chesca Salcedo, Marnie Lapus
32	"Love Square"	Jake Vargas: Raven; Inah de Belen: Roxanne	October 7, 2017
Supporting Cast: Sofia Pablo, Will Ashley De Leon, Rob Gomez
33	"Bilanggo ng Bisyo" (The Allan "Dawn" Gaerlan Story)	Allan Paule: Allan "Dawn" Gaerlan; Addy Raj: Oliver Gaerlan; Mika dela Cruz: Anna Gaerlan	October 21, 2017
Supporting Cast: Arpee Bautista
34	"House Husband" (The Jeric and Marry Ann Silva Story)	Mark Herras: Jeric; Meg Imperial: Marry Ann	October 28, 2017
Supporting Cast: Kate Lapuz
35	"Anak sa Puso"	Kristofer Martin: Carlo	November 11, 2017
Supporting Cast: Tina Paner, Kristine Sablan, Chesca Morales, Jan Urban, Aizel Rivera
36	"My Love from USA"	Bea Binene: Daisy; Ivan Dorschner: Liam	November 18, 2017
Supporting Cast: Tess Bomb, Vince Maristela
37	"Struggle is Real"	Arra San Agustin: Andrea; Jay Arcilla: Richmond	November 25, 2017
Supporting Cast: Ramon Christopher Gutierrez, Sheila Marie Rodriguez, Caprice Cayetano, Loydie Diamante
38	"Love Potion"	Barbie Forteza: Drew; Derrick Monasterio: Barry	December 2, 2017
Supporting Cast: Hannalee Narra, Kean Johnson, Vj Parreno
39	"The Gift"	Kiko Estrada: Hanz	December 9, 2017
Supporting Cast: Alyana Asistio, Denise Barbacena, Karen Timbol
40	"Kuwento Ng Isang Ate"	Gabbi Garcia: Nene	December 16, 2017
Supporting Cast: Ameera Johara, John Bermundo, Katrina Paula, Princess Ortiz, Arpee Bautista
41	"Christmas in My Heart"	Kris Bernal: Christine; Hiro Peralta: Brent	December 23, 2017
Supporting Cast: Rhen Escaño
42	"Hope for a New Life"	Inah de Belen: Via; Jake Vargas: Lyndon	December 30, 2017
Supporting Cast: Allan Paule, Isabel Pablo, Lester Paul Recirdo, Rob Gomez

=== 2018 ===
No.	Title	Cast	Original release date
1	"My Doodled Boyfie"	Joyce Ching: Meryl; Martin del Rosario: Stephen	January 6, 2018
Supporting Cast: Princess Guevarra, Liezel Lopez
2	"Utang sa Puso"	Jason Abalos: Harvey; Faith Da Silva: Charlene	January 13, 2018
Supporting Cast: Gilleth Sandico, Dave Bornea, Rob Gomez, Vince Maristela
3	"Tapsilove"	Gil Cuerva: Tappy; Thea Tolentino: Simang	January 20, 2018
Supporting Cast: Analyn Barro, Isabel Pablo
4	"Ganti ng Anak" (The Vilma Samia Story)	Empress Schuck: Vilma; Lance Serrano: Ricky	January 27, 2018
Supporting Cast: Ralph Noriega, Marika Sasaki, Lovely Rivero
5	"My Lolo's Wish"	Migo Adecer: Gerald; Kate Valdez: Kathleen	February 3, 2018
Supporting Cast: Noel Trinidad, Perla Bautista
6	"Puso ng Ina"	Ynez Veneracion: Melba; Lei Atienza Valdepenas: Carmen	February 10, 2018
Supporting Cast: Ashley Ortega, Miggs Cuaderno
7	"Voice of My Heart"	Kristofer Martin: Kerwin; Jazz Ocampo: Maya	February 17, 2018
Supporting Cast: Sherry Lara, Xyruz Cruz
8	"My Oversized Love" (The Ms. Loren Monares Story)	Cai Cortez: Loren	February 24, 2018
Supporting Cast: Fabio Ide, Diva Montelaba
9	"Pait ng Kahapon"	Inah de Belen: Bella; Yasser Marta: Paul	March 3, 2018
Supporting Cast: Alma Concepcion, Eva Darren, Jay Gonzaga
10	"Bangungot ng Kahapon" (The Carmen "Pards" Raga Story)	Joyce Ching: Carmen	March 10, 2018
Supporting Cast: Mon Confiado, Mark Vergel, Ms. Lui Manansala
11	"Second Chances"	Mark Herras: Nicolai; Liza Ranillo: Connie	March 17, 2018
Supporting Cast: Sofia Pablo, Dan Alvaro, Jelai Espino
12	"The Wedding Coordinator"	Rodjun Cruz: Earl; Joyce Pring: Margaux	March 24, 2018
Supporting Cast: Nicole Kim Donesa, DJ Jhaiho
13	"Love Blends"	Jeric Gonzales: Andy; Kyline Alcantara: Geeree	April 7, 2018
Supporting Cast: Carla Martinez, Buboy Villar
14	"Isang Anak, Dalawang Ina"	LJ Reyes: Seda; Jhoana Marie Tan: Eliza	April 14, 2018
Supporting Cast: Joaquin Manansala
15	"Magandang Ama" (The Willie Garcia Story)	Bembol Roco: Willie	April 21, 2018
Supporting Cast: Helga Krapf, DJ Jhaiho, Hiro Peralta
16	"Broken Hearts Club"	Isabelle de Leon: Betchay; Chase Vega: Topher	April 28, 2018
Supporting Cast: Arianne Bautista, Lharby Policarpio, Adrian Pascual, Vince Maristela
17	"3 Is A Crowd"	Klea Pineda: Shaira; Addy Raj: Ersan; Carl Cervantes: TJ	May 5, 2018
Supporting Cast: Ameera Johara, Joshua Jacobe
18	"My Sister's Secret"	Barbie Forteza: Elvie; Derrick Monasterio: Neri	May 12, 2018
Supporting Cast: Lei Atienza Valdepenas, Juliene Mendoza
19	"One Last Wish"	Migo Adecer: Red; Kelly Day: Bea	May 19, 2018
Supporting Cast: Paolo Gumabao
20	"Hinagpis ng Ina"	Renz Valerio: Jude; Kristina Paner: Eleonor	June 2, 2018
Supporting Cast: Lianne Valentin, Joel Molina, Bianca Casado
21	"Maid for You"	Cai Cortez: Badette; Paolo Contis: Wilfred	June 9, 2018
Supporting Cast: Nicole Donesa, Stanley Abaloc, Marnie Lapuz
22	"Ang Lihim ni Lea"	Devon Seron: Lea	June 16, 2018
Supporting Cast: Yayo Aguila, Reese Tuazon, Prince Clemente
23	"Blood Brothers"	Kristofer Martin: Mico; Jazz Ocampo: Thea	June 23, 2018
Supporting Cast: Andrea del Rosario, Lucho Ayala
24	"My Standby Lover"	Joyce Ching: Gelay; Jeric Gonzales: Zac	July 7, 2018
Supporting Cast: Liezel Lopez, Rob Gomez
25	"The Bes Revenge"	Kim Rodriguez: Isabel	July 14, 2018
Supporting Cast: Alyana Asistio, David Licauco, Mon Marasigan, Edgar Allan Tejeda
26	"My Girlfriend Is A Gangster"	Thea Tolentino: Grace; Juancho Trivino: Rudy	July 21, 2018
Supporting Cast: Chester lee Dacanay, Raffy Tejada, Carlo San Juan, Vince Maristela
27	"Rainbow Love"	Kris Bernal: Jenzen; Martin Escudero: Jaz	August 4, 2018
Supporting Cast: Sky Teotico, Noa Hyun, Marithez Samson, Princess Guevarra
28	"Private Nurse"	Kiko Estrada: Richard; Karen Timbol: Aunor	August 11, 2018
Supporting Cast: Don Umali, Tess Bomb, Althea Ablan, Alyssa De Real
29	"U R My Fortune"	Julie Anne San Jose: Strawberry; Gil Cuerva: Calvin	August 18, 2018
Supporting Cast: Divine, Bryce Eusebio
30	"Twist of Fate"	Mika Dela Cruz: Kara; Phytos Ramirez: Jhemel / Erwin	August 25, 2018
Supporting Cast: Rubi Rubi, Francis Mata
31	"Millennial Lolas"	Perla Bautista: Vicky; Raquel Monteza: Flor	September 8, 2018
Supporting Cast: Menggie Cobarrubias, Pauline Mendoza, Tommy Peñaflor
32	"Bubble Gum Romance"	Gerard Acao: John; Lovely Abella: Emily	September 15, 2018
Supporting Cast: Marnie Lapus, Althea Ablan, Bruce Roeland
33	"Tatlo Kumplikado"	Paul Salas: Sonny; Lianne Valentin: Star	September 29, 2018
Supporting Cast: Lindsay Johnston
34	"The Set Up"	Krystal Reyes: Pearl; Yasser Marta: Jet	October 6, 2018
Supporting Cast: Leandro Baldemor, Lilet Esteban, Rob Gomez, Vince Maristela
35	"Battered BF"	Klea Pineda: Ruby; Jak Roberto: Ambet	October 13, 2018
Supporting Cast: Maricel Morales, Dayara Shane
36	"Anak ng Tadhana"	Kim Rodriguez: Leslie; Paolo Contis: Catler	October 20, 2018
Supporting Cast: Jude Diangson, Angel Estrada
37	"Oh My Ghost"	Kelvin Miranda: Matt; Ameera Johara: Erlie	October 27, 2018
Supporting Cast: Ayeesha Cervantes, Vince Crisostomo, Jude Matthew Servilla, Vangie Labalan
38	"Struggle is Real"	Arra San Agustin: Andrea; Jay Arcilla: Richmond	November 3, 2018
Supporting Cast: Ramon Christopher Gutierrez, Sheila Marie Rodriguez, Caprice Cayetano, Loydie Diamante
39 41	"Magkapatid, Magkaribal"	Ruru Madrid: Red; Ken Chan: Blue	November 10, 2018; November 17, 2018; November 24, 2018
Supporting Cast: John Kenneth Giducos, Dentrix Ponce, Patricia Javier
42	"Love Blends"	Jeric Gonzales: Andy; Kyline Alcantara: Geeree	December 1, 2018
Supporting Cast: Carla Martinez, Buboy Villar
43	"I Love You Not"	Jazz Ocampo: Sandra; Marissa Delgado: Lola Patchie; Phytos Ramirez: Miguel	December 8, 2018
Supporting Cast: Angelika Santiago, Daryl dela Cruz
44	"Sweetest Revenge"	Migo Adecer: Anthony; Ash Ortega: Margareth	December 15, 2018
Supporting Cast: Angel Guardian, JJ Arao
45	"Munting Hiling"	Tanya Garcia: Evelyn; Miggs Cuaderno: Rocco	December 22, 2018
Supporting Cast: Seth dela Cruz, Bryce Eusebio, Francis Matheu
46	"Hope for a New Life"	Inah de Belen: Via; Jake Vargas: Lyndon	December 29, 2018
Supporting Cast: Allan Paule, Isabel Pablo, Lester Paul Recirdo, Rob Gomez

=== 2019 ===
No.	Title	Cast	Original release date
1	"Lend Me Your Love"	Kiray Celis: Mayumi; Addy Raj: Talha	January 5, 2019
Supporting Cast: Tess Bomb, Mike Vergel
2	"Love Begins"	Joko Diaz: Gil; Yasser Marta: Bien	January 12, 2019
Supporting Cast: Sharmaine Santiago, Sophie Albert
3	"Battered BF"	Klea Pineda: Ruby; Jak Roberto: Ambet	January 19, 2019
Supporting Cast: Maricel Morales, Dayara Shane
4	"My Mother's Lover"	Jeric Gonzales: Luis; Jazz Ocampo: Celine	January 26, 2019
Supporting Cast: Alma Concepcion, Tomas Penaflor
5 7	"Undying Love"	Bianca Umali: Clarisse; Miguel Tanfelix: Russell	February 9, 2019; February 16, 2019; February 23, 2019
Supporting Cast: Lianne Valentin, Ermie Concepcion, Dentrix Ponce
8	"My Sister's Secret"	Barbie Forteza: Elvie; Derrick Monasterio: Neri	March 2, 2019
Supporting Cast: Lei Atienza Valdepenas, Juliene Mendoza
9	"My Best Love"	Manolo Pedrosa: Kairon; Kate Valdez: Eloisa	March 9, 2019
Supporting Cast: Tess Bomb
10	"The Saddest Wedding"	Kristofer Martin: Tyron; Devon Seron: Dinky	March 16, 2019
Supporting Cast: JJ Ararao
11	"U R My Fortune"	Julie Anne San Jose: Strawberry; Gil Cuerva: Calvin	March 23, 2019
Supporting Cast: Divine, Bryce Eusebio
12	"The Bachelorette"	Isabelle de Leon: Vera	March 30, 2019
Supporting Cast: Clint Bondad, Liezel Lopez, Ana de Leon
13	"Same Time, Same Place"	Martin del Rosario: Mateo	April 6, 2019
Supporting Cast: Arra San Agustin, Jenzel Angeles, Rob Gomez
14	"Hugot Camp"	Kim Rodriguez: Betchay	April 13, 2019
Supporting Cast: James Teng, Angel Guardian, Kelvin Miranda
15	"Hinagpis ng Ina"	Renz Valerio: Jude	April 27, 2019
Supporting Cast: Tina Paner, Lianne Valentin, Joel Molina, Bianca Casado
16	"Grow Old With You"	Marissa Delgado: Lucia; Juan Rodrigo: Antonio	May 4, 2019
Supporting Cast: Ayra Mariano, Prince Clemente
17	"Bad Mom"	Thea Tolentino: Paula	May 11, 2019
Supporting Cast: Cheska Diaz, Liza Ranillo, Nikki Co, Sean Lucas
18	"Love Remembers"	Ash Ortega: Emily; Edgar Allan Guzman: Michael	May 18, 2019
Supporting Cast: Warren Perez
19	"Rainbow Love"	Kris Bernal: Jenzen; Martin Escudero: Jaz	May 25, 2019
Supporting Cast: Sky Teotico, Noa Hyun, Marithez Samson, Princess Guevarra
20	"Back to One"	Aira Bermudez: Christina; Brent Valdez: Raymond	June 1, 2019
Supporting Cast: Ysabel Ortega, Karlo Duterte, Lander Vera Perez
21	"Feelennial Mamsh"	Rubi Rubi: Scarlet; Kate Valdez: Ivy	June 8, 2019
Supporting Cast: Don Umali, Fifi
22	"Bitter Memory"	Kyline Alcantara: Madel	June 15, 2019
Supporting Cast: Allan Paule, Gwen Garci, Arpee Bautista
23	"Love Scam and Go"	Rita De Guzman: Ligaya; Addy Raj: Brandon	June 22, 2019
Supporting Cast: Jenzel Angeles, Patani
24	"Ang Lihim ni Lea"	Devon Seron: Lea	June 29, 2019
Supporting Cast: Yayo Aguila, Reese Tuazon, Prince Clemente
25	"My Wicked Tita"	Sofia Pablo: Jona; Will Ashley: Rico	July 6, 2019
Supporting Cast: Regine Tolentino, Elijah Alejo
26	"My Unwanted Son"	Joaquin Domagoso: Joms	July 13, 2019
Supporting Cast: Kiel Rodriguez, Ayeesha Cervantes, Julianna Rae, Angelu de Leon
27 29	"Rainbow Home"	Edgar Allan Guzman: Peter; Kristofer Martin: Matthew	July 20, 2019; July 27, 2019; August 3, 2019
Supporting Cast: Sheila Marie Rodriguez, Seth Dela Cruz, Khaine Dela Cruz, Dave Bornea, Ayra Mariano, Leandro Baldemor, Vince Maristela
30	"Anak ng Tadhana"	Kim Rodriguez: Leslie; Paolo Contis: Catler	August 10, 2019
Supporting Cast: Jude Diangson, Angel Estrada, Rob Gomez, Sean Lucas
31 33	"Daddy-Cated"	Rocco Nacino: Deo	August 17, 2019; August 24, 2019; August 31, 2019
Supporting Cast: Nicole Donesa, Angel Ulip, Angela Alarcon
34	"My Mother's Lover"	Jeric Gonzales: Luis; Jazz Ocampo: Celine	September 7, 2019
Supporting Cast: Tomas Penaflor, Alma Concepcion
35	"Beautiful Bossing"	Kiray Celis: Babi; Jak Roberto: Binoy	September 14, 2019
Supporting Cast: Jenzel Angeles, Divine
36	"My Charming Prince"	David Licauco: Prince; Shaira Diaz: Odhesa	September 21, 2019
Supporting Cast: Joaquin Manansala, Jay Garcia
37	"FRIENDS-Ever"	Will Ashley: Mesh; Sofia Pablo: Emmy	September 28, 2019
Supporting Cast: Shermaine Santiago, Liza Ranillo
38	"Bubble Gum Romance"	Gerard Acao: John; Lovely Abella: Emily	October 5, 2019
Supporting Cast: Marnie Lapus, Althea Ablan, Bruce Roeland
39	"Unexpected Blessing"	Thea Tolentino: Camille; Lucho Ayala: Kelvin	October 12, 2019
Supporting Cast: Dianne Medina
40	"Amir vs. America"	Jillian Ward: Sara; Vince Crisostomo: Amir	October 19, 2019
Supporting Cast: Ana de Leon
41	"My Imaginary Friend"	Sanya Lopez: Eva; Kate Valdez: Friend	October 26, 2019
Supporting Cast: Alec Calderon, Bong Regala, Sheila Marie Rodriguez
42	"Oh My Ghost"	Kelvin Miranda: Matt; Ameera Johara: Erlie	November 2, 2019
Supporting Cast: Ayeesha Cervantes, Vince Crisostomo, Jude Matthew Servilla, Vangie Labalan
43	"Heaven Knows"	Kyline Alcantara: Pampam; Migo Adecer: Hero	November 9, 2019
Supporting Cast: Thou Reyes, Vince Maristela
44	"Love or Money"	Rubi Rubi: Cecilia; Gene Padilla: Diego	November 16, 2019
Supporting Cast: Shayne Sava, Jeremy Sabido, Sean Lucas
45	"Bratty Nella"	Ash Ortega: Nella	November 23, 2019
Supporting Cast: Manolo Pedrosa, Gilleth Sandico
46	"Grow Old With You"	Marissa Delgado: Lucia; Juan Rodrigo: Antonio	November 30, 2019
Supporting Cast: Ayra Mariano, Prince Clemente
47	"Untrue Love"	Klea Pineda: Sian; Jeric Gonzales: Poy	December 7, 2019
Supporting Cast: Joel Palencia, Tess Bomb
48	"Miss Fortune"	Arra San Agustin: Bela; Yasser Marta: Kyle	December 14, 2019
Supporting Cast: Diego Llorico
49	"Munting Hiling"	Tanya Garcia: Evelyn; Miggs Cuaderno: Rocco	December 21, 2019
Supporting Cast: Seth dela Cruz, Bryce Eusebio, Francis Matheu
50	"Little Angel"	Kim Rodriguez: Dana; Rodjun Cruz: Apollo	December 28, 2019
Supporting Cast: Caprice Cayetano

=== 2020 ===
No.	Title	Cast	Original release date
1	"My Lolo's Wish"	Migo Adecer: Gerald; Kate Valdez: Kathleen	January 4, 2020
Supporting Cast: Noel Trinidad, Perla Bautista
2	"The Bullied Boys"	Dentrix Ponce: Marc; Bruce Roeland: Khalil; Joel Molina: Randy	January 11, 2020
Supporting Cast: Christopher Roxas, Sean Lucas
3	"Stage Mom-Ager"	Phoemela Baranda: Judy	January 18, 2020
Supporting Cast: Althea Ablan, Kiel Rodriguez
4	"Love, Scam and Go"	Rita Daniela: Ligaya; Addy Raj: Brandon	January 25, 2020
Supporting Cast: Patani, Jenzel Angeles
5	"Back at Home"	Mark Herras: Fidel; Inah De Belen: Marsh	February 1, 2020
Supporting Cast: Raphael Landicho
6	"A Fake Love Story"	Kelvin Miranda: Rambo; Angel Guardian: Che Che	February 8, 2020
Supporting Cast: Dave Bornea, Brent Valdez
7	"Lolo Cupid"	Ayra Mariano: Love; Nikki Co: Blake; Yuan Francisco: Jacob	February 15, 2020
Supporting Cast: Bodjie Pascua
8	"Pamilya Mapalad"	Elijah Alejo: Luisa; Anna Vicente: Joyce	February 22, 2020
Supporting Cast: Arpee Bautista, Sheila Marie Rodriguez, Ynez Veneracion
9	"Feelennial Mamsh"	Kate Valdez: Ivy; Rubi Rubi: Scarlet	February 29, 2020
Supporting Cast: Don Umali, Fifi
10	"Three Little Suitors"	Althea Ablan: Hanah; Julius Miguel: Cedee; Dentrix Ponce: Ace; Bruce Roeland: Bryan	March 7, 2020
Supporting Cast: Anjay Anson, Vince Maristela, Bong Regala
11	"Amir vs. America"	Jillian Ward: Sara; Vince Crisostomo: Amir	March 14, 2020
Supporting Cast: Ana de Leon
12	"Crush Me"	Sofia Pablo: Merry; Allen Ansay: Simon; Miggs Cuaderno: Anthony	March 21, 2020
Supporting Cast: Lot-Lot Bustamante
13	"My Charming Prince"	David Licauco: Prince; Shaira Diaz: Odhesa	March 28, 2020
Supporting Cast: Joaquin Manansala, Jay Garcia
14	"My Unwanted Son"	Joaquin Domagoso: Joms	April 4, 2020
Supporting Cast: Kiel Rodriguez, Ayeesha Cervantes, Julianna Rae, Angelu de Leon
15	"Ayuda Son"	Ruru Madrid: Yuri Lacsamana	June 27, 2020
Supporting Cast: Rere Madrid, Philip Lazaro
16	"Love Is Sweeter the Second Time... On a Lockdown"	Benjamin Alves: Lloyd Sevilla; Sanya Lopez: Anna Sevilla	July 4, 2020
Supporting Cast: Maila Gumila
17	"Love Wins"	Kristofer Martin: SB; Dave Bornea: EJ	July 11, 2020
Supporting Cast: Melissa Mendez, Nicole Donesa, Ana De Leon, Jong Cuenco, April Labana
18	"A Game Called Love"	Kate Valdez: Ellie; Marco Gallo: Chris	July 18, 2020
Supporting Cast: Ella Cristofani, Pekto, Andreo Javier
19	"Who's Your Daddy?"	Andre Paras:	August 1, 2020
Supporting Cast: Minnie Aguilar, Benjie Paras
