= Phytos Ramirez =

Filipino actor and model

- Born: Neofytos Tuddao Kyriacou; July 18, 1995 (age 31); Athens, Greece
- Other name: Phytos Kyriacou
- Occupations: Actor; model; endorser; host; entrepreneur
- Years active: 2001–present
- Agents: Star Magic (2010–2014); Sparkle GMA Artist Center (2014–21)
- Known for: Encantadia
- Height: 6 ft 0 in (183 cm)
- Spouse: Cherry Lou (m. 2024)
- Children: 3

Neofytos Tuddao Kyriacou (Greek: Νεόφυτος Κυριάκου; born July 18, 1995), professionally known by his stage name Phytos Ramirez, is a Filipino actor, model, host, and entrepreneur. He is known for his involvement in the Encantadia franchise, where he appeared in both 2005 and 2016 iterations.

== Personal life and career ==
Ramirez was born in Athens, Greece, to a Greek father and a Filipino mother. He immigrated to the Philippines at a young age and grew up in San Mateo, Rizal. He started for modeling in television advertisements and made his acting debut via the late Eddie Garcia-directed film Abakada... Ina in 2001.

He first appeared on television via ABS-CBN's drama series Hiram in 2004. Ramirez guested on GMA Network's fantasy series Encantadia as the young version of Mark Herras' character Anthony.

Ramirez took a temporary hiatus from showbiz to focus on his studies and later returned on 2010 via Basahang Ginto. The same year, He signed a contract with Star Magic and appeared in some of ABS-CBN's dramas, including the remakes of their classics Mara Clara and Mula sa Puso.

Ramirez marked his comeback on GMA Network in 2014 via Paraiso Ko'y Ikaw.

On December 8, 2016, he opened a food stall business called Zorpas Greek Food, located in Marikina.

After his stint in the original series, Ramirez returned to the Encantadia franchise on February 27, 2017, where he portrayed the grown up Paopao in the 2016 remake.

Ramirez started hosting in Unang Hirit and appeared in more of GMA's programs including Contessa, Madrasta, and GTV's The Lost Recipe, which was previously aired on GMA News TV.

After years of being a Roman Catholic, he converted and became a born-again Christian on November 23, 2017. In September 2020, Ramirez revealed his relationship with singer-actress Cherry Lou Despite Lou's marriage to actor Michael Agassi, Ramirez and Lou welcomed their first child together in 2021. The couple were married in 2024.

== Filmography ==
=== Film ===
Year	Title	Role
2001	Abakada... Ina	
2001	Tatarin	
2004	Masikip sa Dibdib	Boogie (credited as Phytos Kyriacou)
2007	The Promise	young Jason (credited as Phytos Kyriacou)
2008	Ang Tanging Ina N'yong Lahat	Shammy's friend (credited as Phytos Kyriacou)
2009	Limos	
2015	Haunted Mansion	Jack

=== Television ===
Year	Title	Role
2003	Darating ang Umaga	Ken
2004	Hiram	
2005	Encantadia	young Anthony
2006	Gulong ng Palad	young Carding Medel (uncredited; as Phytos Kyriacou)
2010–2011	Mara Clara	Miguel "Migs" Soriano (credited as Phytos Kyriacou)
2011	Mula sa Puso	Neil (credited as Phytos Kyriacou)
2011	Maalaala Mo Kaya: Kuweba	Kadir (credited as Phytos Kyriacou)
2011	Guns and Roses	young King Santana (uncredited)
2012	E-Boy	Pugo (uncredited)
2012	Maalaala Mo Kaya: Komiks	King (credited as Phytos Kyriacou)
2012–2013	Princess and I	Dasho Pelden (credited as Phytos Kyriacou)
2014	Paraiso Ko'y Ikaw	Brix Illustre/Brix Castillo
2014	Magpakailanman: Barangay Cybersex: The Jenna Espinosa Story	Albert
2014	Maynila: Misyon ng Puso	Jesse
2014	Maynila: Of Love & Second Chances	
2014	Magpakailanman: Ama ko, Mahal ko: The Kim Fajardo Story	Addict
2014	Maynila: You're Beautiful	Gerald Reyes
2014	Seasons of Love: BF for Hire, GF for Life	Julian Abela
2015	Maynila: Magpakatotoo ka, teh!	Luigi
2015	Let the Love Begin	Rafael "Uno" Fernandez / Fake DJ 1D
2015	Magpakailanman: Sex Slave: Anak, Pinabayaan ng Ina? - The Belen and Ayen Story	Cliff ouie
2015	Maynila: Copy Cat Love	Randy
2015	Magpakailanman: Ina ko, Bugaw ko	Chris
2015	Wattpad Presents: My Chinito	Jonathan
2015	Wagas: Kulam at Pag-Ibig	Tony
2015	Dangwa	Dante Arrozaga (formerly uncredited)
2016	Maynila: Love Your Enemy	Andrew
2016	Maynila: Beki Moves	Gibo
2016	Once Again	young Lukas Carbonnel
2016	Maynila: My Destiny	Carlo
2016	Magpakailanman: Sa Kabila ng Lahat, Ikaw Pa Rin	Arman
2016	Oh, My Mama!	Justin Gutierrez
2016	Magpakailanman: Ang Sundalong Magiting	PVC Lorenzo
2017	Maynila: New Beginnings	Andre
2017	Magpakailanman: Justice for the Battered Child	Angelo
2017	Wish Ko Lang!: Secret Singer	Willie
2017	Imbestigador: Chop Chop Lady	Alvin Delos Angeles
2017	Encantadia	Paopao
2017	Imbestigador: Monica	Lawrence Simbul
2017	Unang Hirit	Himself / Co-host
2017	Daig Kayo ng Lola Ko: The Toy Soldier and Ballerina Doll Love Story	Bobot
2017	Trops	Diego
2017	Road Trip	Himself / Guest
2017	G.R.I.N.D. Get Ready It's a New Day	Alfred
2017	Alyas Robin Hood	Kevin
2017	Maynila: Opposites Attract	JM Enriquez
2017	Wish Ko Lang: Mag-ina	Lester
2017	Daig Kayo ng Lola Ko: Alamat ni Bernardo Carpio	Biento
2017	Magpakailanman: Kuwentong Marawi sa Mata ng Isang Sundalo - The PFC Jomille Pavia Story	Capt. Dela Cruz
2017	Wagas: Sa Kabila ng Lahat	Topoy
2018	Magpakailanman: My Nanay and I	Oscar
2018	Wagas: Baliw na Puso	Jerry
2018	Contessa	Winston Mallari
2018	Maynila: Twist of Fate	Jhemel / Erwin
2018	Wagas: Pag-Ibig at Lagim	Rey
2018	Tadhana: DH for Sale	Yousef
2018	Dear Uge: Un-Ex-pected Love	Dennis
2018	My Special Tatay	Jeff
2018	Maynila: I Love You Not	Miguel
2018	Magpakailanman: Little People, Big Winners	Raffy
2019	Dear Uge: It's Complicated	Froilan
2019	TODA One I Love	EncanTODA (uncredited)
2019	Stories for the Soul: The Bad Sam	Daniel
2019	Dragon Lady	Lee (uncredited)
2019	Magpakailanman: Beki Basketball Beauties	MC
2019	Tadhana: Sanib	Troy
2019	Daig Kayo ng Lola Ko: My Vampire Love	Luther
2019–2020	Madrasta	David Generoso
2021	Dear Uge: Tom and Journey	Randy
2021	The Lost Recipe	Tom
2021	Stories From The Heart: Never Say Goodbye	Joshua Quinto

== Awards and nominations ==
Year	Award ceremony	Category	Nominee(s)/work(s)	Result	Ref.
2020	RAWR Awards	Beshie Ng Taon	Madrasta	Nominated	

== See also ==
- John Manalo
- Greek settlement in the Philippines
