= Coleen Perez =

Filipina commercial model and actress

- Born: Coleen Nicole Perez Borgonia; April 6, 1994 (age 32); Gapan, Nueva Ecija, Philippines
- Occupations: Actress, teen star, model
- Years active: 2014–present
- Agent: GMA Artist Center

Coleen Perez (born Coleen Nicole Perez Borgonia on April 6, 1994) is a Filipina commercial model and actress, known for her roles such as Molly Rivera in GMA Network's More Than Words.

== Filmography ==
=== Television ===
Year	Title	Role	Type of Role
2014	Seasons of Love: I Do, I Don't	Sinag	Episode guest / Antagonist
2014	Magpakailanman: Girl, Boy, Bakla, Tomboy: The Humawid Family Story	Mary Rose Humawid	Episode guest
2014–2015	More Than Words	Molly Rivera	Supporting role / Antagonist
2015	Magpakailanman: Walang Hanggang Paalam	Alma	Episode guest
2015	Magpakailanman: Mga Anak ng Aking Asawa	Young Leda	Episode guest
2015	InstaDad	Annie	Supporting role / Antagonist
2015	My Mother's Secret	Paula	Supporting role
2015	Maynila: Copy Cat Love	Dessa Barbacena	Episode guest
2015	Magpakailanman: SaveTheMaid	Jenny	Episode guest
2015	My Faithful Husband	Celine Vera-Perez	Extended role
2016	Dangwa	Clarissa	Episode guest
2016	A1 Ko Sa 'Yo	Pamela	Episode guest
2016	Hanggang Makita Kang Muli	Myla	Supporting role / Antagonist / Protagonist
2016	Wagas: Ang Turista at ang Probinsyana		Episode guest / Antagonist
2017	Meant to Be	Grace	Extended role
2017	D' Originals	Sally	Guest appearance / Antagonist
2017	Imbestigador: Mayora	Angela Leyson	Episode guest / Protagonist
2018	Wish Ko Lang: Lubag Syndrome	Cessy	Episode guest / Protagonist
2018	Inday Will Always Love You	Board Director	Episode guest
2022	Wish Ko Lang: Ibinagsak	Trixie	Episode guest / Antagonist
