= Dangwa =

Philippine television drama series

- Title card
- Genre: Drama; Romantic fantasy
- Directed by: Adolfo Alix Jr.
- Starring: Janine Gutierrez
- Opening theme: "Pag-ibig" by Sponge Cola
- Country of origin: Philippines
- Original language: Tagalog
- No. of episodes: 70

Production
- Production locations: Manila, Philippines
- Camera setup: Multiple-camera setup
- Running time: 16–20 minutes
- Production company: GMA News and Public Affairs

Original release
- Network: GMA Network
- Release: October 26, 2015 – January 29, 2016

Dangwa is a Philippine television drama romance fantasy series broadcast by GMA Network. Directed by Adolf Alix Jr., it stars Janine Gutierrez. It premiered on the network's morning line up from October 26, 2015, to January 29, 2016. The series concluded on January 29, 2016, with a total of 70 episodes.

The series is streaming online on YouTube.

== Cast and characters ==
Cast

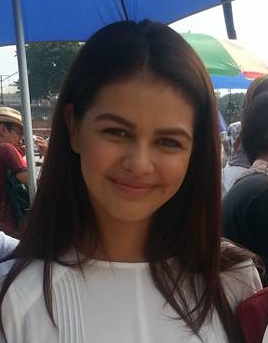
Janine Gutierrez

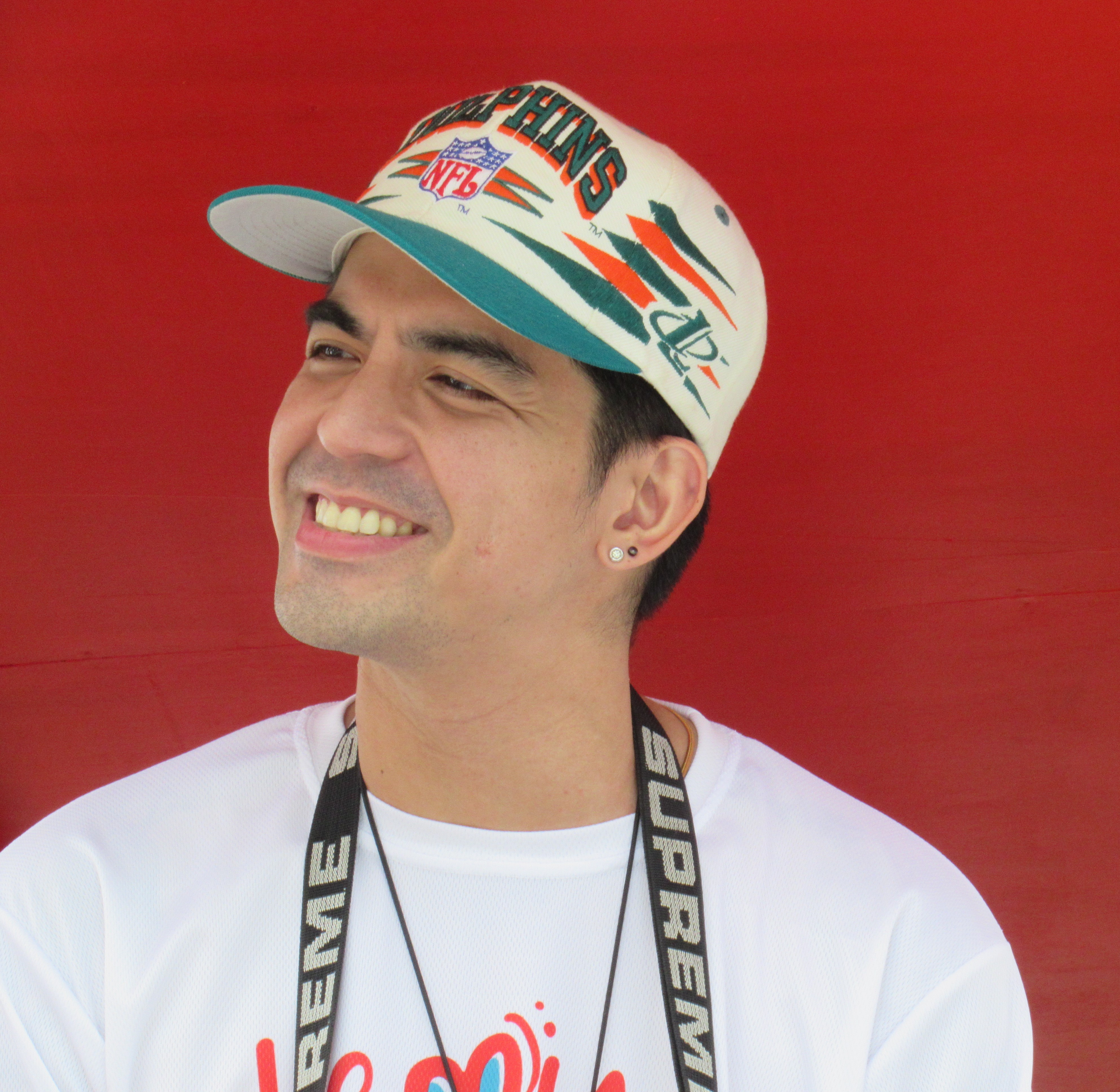
Mark Herras

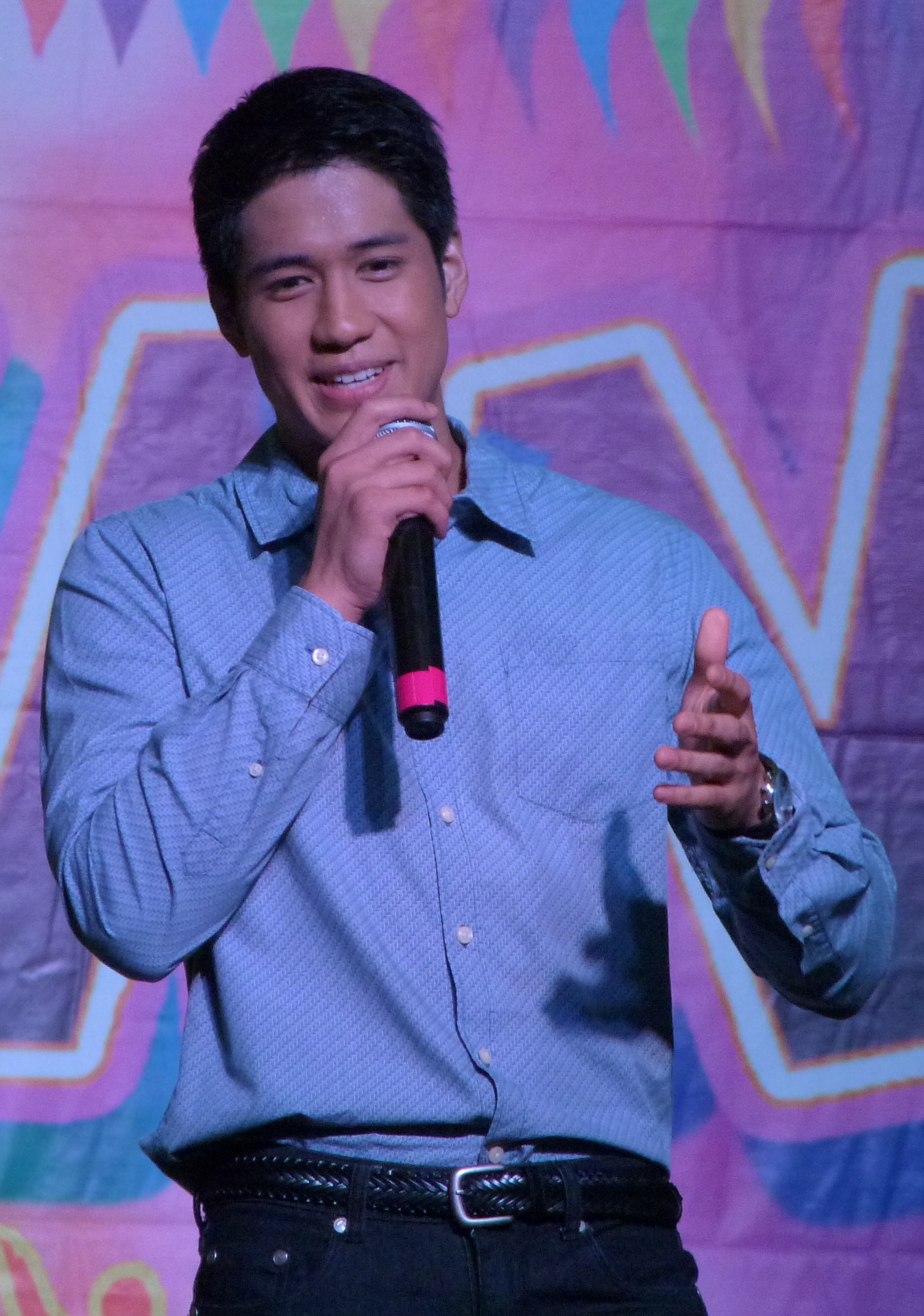
Aljur Abrenica

Lead cast

- Janine Gutierrez as Maria Rosa Capulong

Supporting cast

- Mark Herras as Sebastian "Baste" Espinoza
- Aljur Abrenica as Lorenzo "Renz" Arguente

Recurring cast

- Jackie Lou Blanco as Veronica Arguente
- Rey "PJ" Abellana as Carlos Guinto
- Stephanie Sol as Dianne
- Arianne Bautista as Nana
- Lance Serrano as Jake
- Bryan Benedict as Rene
- Dan Alvaro as Erning
- Antonette Garcia as Miriam Urdaneta
- Mailes Kanapi as Ada
- Gigi Locsin as Fe Manlupe
- James Alfred Cruz as Caloy
- Rolando Inocencio as Father Manalo
- Carmelo Gutierrez as Kapitan
- Cesar Batitis as Wally

Guest cast

- Martin del Rosario as Miguel
- Ash Ortega as Wendy Selene Schmitt
- Ruru Madrid as Carl
- Barbie Forteza as Mary
- Thea Tolentino as Faye
- Andre Paras as Roger
- Rhian Ramos as Sheryl "She" Cruz
- Geoff Eigenmann as Mike
- Betong Sumaya as Donya
- Maey Bautista as Rica
- Megan Young as Jane Imperial
- Mikael Daez as Jericho Santillan
- Arny Ross as Fiona
- Carla Abellana as Julia
- Rafael Rosell as Leo
- Pauleen Luna as Jenny
- Fabio Ide as Brian
- Jerald Napoles as Tonio
- Ervic Vijandre as Christian
- Louise delos Reyes as Toni Katigbak
- Derrick Monasterio as Graham Bell
- Rodjun Cruz as Ethan
- Matet de Leon as Mercy Katigbak
- Bianca Umali as Lia De Guzman
- Miguel Tanfelix as Josh
- Glaiza de Castro as Ella and Emma
- Boy2 Quizon as Joey
- Roxee B as Venus
- Ayra Mariano as Mary Rose Capulong
- Boobay as Jaja

== Ratings ==
Dangwa ratings
No.	Original release date	AGB Nielsen Mega Manila ratings	Timeslot rank
1	October 26, 2015	16.3%	#1
2	October 27, 2015	13.9%	#1
3	October 28, 2015	15.7%	#1
4	October 29, 2015	14.0%	#1
5	October 30, 2015	14.1%	#1
6	November 2, 2015	13.2%	#1
7	November 3, 2015	12.6%	#1
8	November 4, 2015	14.3%	#1
9	November 5, 2015	13.7%	#1
10	November 6, 2015	13.1%	#1
11	November 9, 2015	14.4%	#1
12	November 10, 2015	11.6%	#1
13	November 11, 2015	11.6%	#1
14	November 12, 2015	12.6%	#1
15	November 13, 2015	13.3%	#1
16	November 16, 2015	13.0%	#1
17	November 17, 2015	12.2%	#1
18	November 18, 2015	14.1%	#1
19	November 19, 2015	12.3%	#1
20	November 20, 2015	13.1%	#1
21	November 23, 2015	11.4%	#1
22	November 24, 2015	9.4%	#1
23	November 25, 2015	12.0%	#1
24	November 26, 2015	10.8%	#1
25	November 27, 2015	10.8%	#1
26	November 30, 2015	12.0%	#1
27	December 1, 2015	9.1%	#1
28	December 2, 2015	10.6%	#1
29	December 3, 2015	8.1%	#2
30	December 4, 2015	11.3%	#1
31	December 7, 2015	9.8%	#2
32	December 8, 2015	9.8%	#1
33	December 9, 2015	9.2%	#1
34	December 10, 2015	9.9%	#1
35	December 11, 2015	9.9%	#1
36	December 14, 2015	9.0%	#1
37	December 15, 2015	12.0%	#1
38	December 16, 2015	12.9%	#1
39	December 17, 2015	9.2%	#1
40	December 18, 2015	9.4%	#1
41	December 21, 2015	12.4%	#1
42	December 22, 2015	9.6%	#1
43	December 23, 2015	10.3%	#1
44	December 24, 2015	9.6%	#1
45	December 25, 2015	7.0%	#1
46	December 28, 2015	9.2%	#1
47	December 29, 2015	8.7%	#2
48	December 30, 2015	7.5%	#1
49	December 31, 2015	7.4%	#2
50	January 1, 2016	8.4%	#1
51	January 4, 2016	8.5%	#1
52	January 5, 2016	7.3%	#2
53	January 6, 2016	8.7%	#1
54	January 7, 2016	10.1%	#1
55	January 8, 2016	9.9%	#1
56	January 11, 2016	8.6%	#1
57	January 12, 2016	8.8%	#1
58	January 13, 2016	7.1%	#2
59	January 14, 2016	8.8%	#1
60	January 15, 2016	9.2%	#2
61	January 18, 2016	7.9%	#2
62	January 19, 2016	9.2%	#2
63	January 20, 2016	9.4%	#1
64	January 21, 2016	8.6%	#2
65	January 22, 2016	9.0%	#2
66	January 25, 2016	9.4%	#1
67	January 26, 2016	9.6%	#1
68	January 27, 2016	7.8%	#1
69	January 28, 2016	9.0%	#1
70	January 29, 2016	8.9%	#2
