= More Than Words (TV series) =

Philippine television drama series

- Title card
- Genre: Drama; Romantic comedy
- Created by: Homer Novicio
- Written by: Marlon Miguel; Glaiza Ramirez; Gilbeys Sardea; Homer Novicio
- Directed by: Andoy L. Ranay
- Creative directors: Jun Lana; Roy Iglesias
- Starring: Janine Gutierrez; Elmo Magalona
- Opening theme: "More Than Words" by Janine Gutierrez and Elmo Magalona
- Country of origin: Philippines
- Original language: Tagalog
- No. of episodes: 80 (list of episodes)

Production
- Executive producer: Arlene D. Pilapil
- Production locations: Quezon City, Philippines
- Cinematography: Juan Lorenzo Orendain III; Nor Domingo
- Editors: Meg Roque; Neil Stephen Servantes; Mildred Villegas
- Camera setup: Multiple-camera setup
- Running time: 21–31 minutes
- Production company: GMA Entertainment TV

Original release
- Network: GMA Network
- Release: November 17, 2014 – March 6, 2015

More Than Words is a Philippine television drama romantic comedy series broadcast by GMA Network. Directed by Andoy Ranay, it stars Janine Gutierrez and Elmo Magalona. It premiered on November 17, 2014 on the network's Telebabad line up. The series concluded on March 6, 2015, with a total of 80 episodes.

The series is streaming online on YouTube.

== Premise ==
Ikay, a girl taunted at school her because of her looks and personality and writer of the online fiction, Diary of a Queen Bee in which she created her dream boy, Hiro. One morning, Ikay sees a boy washed ashore which is the guy she pictured in her online blog.

== Cast and characters ==
Cast

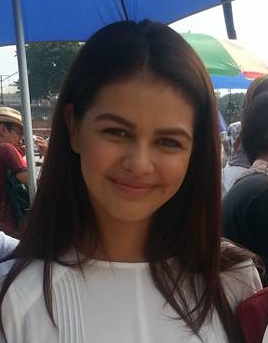
Janine Gutierrez

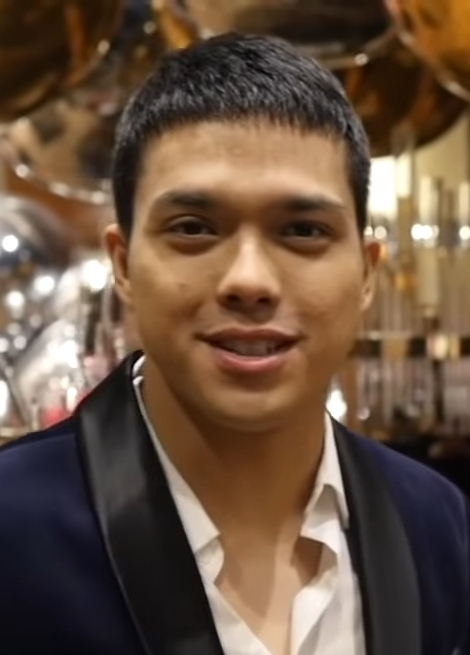
Elmo Magalona

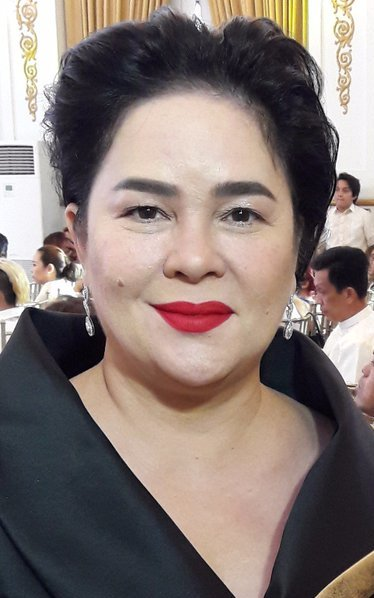
Jaclyn Jose

Lead cast

- Janine Gutierrez as Erika "Ikay" Balmores / Katy Perez
- Elmo Magalona as Hiro / Juan Sebastian "Basty" Santillian III / Junifer Fuentes

Supporting cast

- Jaclyn Jose as Precy Balmores
- Gardo Versoza as Victor Balboa
- Yayo Aguila as Marissa Santillian-Balboa
- Rey "PJ" Abellana as Emil Fuentes
- Leni Santos as Rose Vera-Fuentes
- Enzo Pineda as Nathaniel ”Nate” Alvarez
- Stephanie Sol as Isabelle "Belle" Acosta
- Mayton Eugenio as Chelsea de Silva
- Coleen Perez as Molly Rivera
- Frances Makil-Ignacio as Cristina Acosta
- Joe Baracho as Francis Acosta
- Mikoy Morales as Chester Balboa
- Bryan Benedict as Elvis Emerson

Guest cast

- Nathalie Hart as younger Precy
- Juancho Trivino as younger Victor
- Ernie Zarate
- Kylie Padilla as Roxanne / Katie
- Kiko Estrada as Philip
- Bea Binene as Heidilyn Balboa

== Ratings ==
More Than Words ratings
Episode	Original air date	AGB Nielsen Mega Manila Households Television Homes			Ref.
Episode	Original air date	Rating	Timeslot rank	Primetime rank	Ref.
1	November 17, 2014	21.6%	#1	#1	
2	November 18, 2014	21.8%	#1	#2	
3	November 19, 2014	22.0%	#1	#2	
4	November 20, 2014	21.5%	#2	#5	
5	November 21, 2014	19.3%	#2	#5	
6	November 24, 2014	18.9%	#2	#6	
7	November 25, 2014	20.7%	#2	#4	
8	November 26, 2014	19.5%	#2	#5	
9	November 27, 2014	21.5%	#2	#4	
10	November 28, 2014	20.4%	#2	#6	
11	December 1, 2014	18.9%	#2	#7	
12	December 2, 2014	18.5%	#2	#5	
13	December 3, 2014	18.8%	#2	#6	
14	December 4, 2014	20.4%	#2	#5	
15	December 5, 2014	20.5%	#2	#5	
16	December 8, 2014	22.5%	#2	#5	
17	December 9, 2014	21.9%	#2	#3	
18	December 10, 2014	21.6%	#1	#4	
19	December 11, 2014	21.1%	#2	#5	
20	December 12, 2014	19.4%	#2	#4	
21	December 15, 2014	19.6%	#2	#4	
22	December 16, 2014	17.9%	#2	#6	
23	December 17, 2014	17.5%	#2	#6	
24	December 18, 2014	18.1%	#2	#7	
25	December 19, 2014	16.9%	#2	#6	
26	December 22, 2014	16.9%	#2	#8	
27	December 23, 2014	17.1%	#2	#6	
28	December 24, 2014	16.7%	#2	#4	
29	December 25, 2014	18.0%	#1	#3	
30	December 26, 2014	18.3%	#2	#5	
31	December 29, 2014	19.6%	#1	#4	
32	December 30, 2014	19.1%	#1	#3	
33	December 31, 2014	13.4%	#1	#6	
34	January 1, 2015	18.7%	#2	#4	
35	January 2, 2015	21.6%	#1	#2	
36	January 5, 2015	19.2%	#2	#5	
37	January 6, 2015	19.2%	#2	#5	
38	January 7, 2015	17.5%	#2	#4	
39	January 8, 2015	21.3%	#1	#2	
40	January 9, 2015	19.9%	#1	#3	
41	January 12, 2015	21.2%	#1	#3	
42	January 13, 2015	22.2%	#1	#2	
43	January 14, 2015	20.6%	#1	#2	
44	January 15, 2015	22.4%	#1	#2	
45	January 16, 2015	19.8%	#1	#2	
46	January 19, 2015	20.6%	#1	#2	
47	January 20, 2015	20.2%	#1	#3	
48	January 21, 2015	18.6%	#1	#3	
49	January 22, 2015	19.9%	#1	#5	
50	January 23, 2015	18.6%	#2	#5	
51	January 26, 2015	18.6%	#2	#5	
52	January 27, 2015	18.2%	#2	#4	
53	January 28, 2015	19.1%	#2	#6	
54	January 29, 2015	19.8%	#1	#5	
55	January 30, 2015	16.6%	#2	#7	
56	February 2, 2015	18.1%	#2	#5	
57	February 3, 2015	18.5%	#2	#5	
58	February 4, 2015	20.5%	#2	#3	
59	February 5, 2015	17.1%	#2	#6	
60	February 6, 2015	17.8%	#2	#5	
61	February 9, 2015	18.8%	#2	#5	
62	February 10, 2015	18.9%	#2	#6	
63	February 11, 2015	18.4%	#2	#7	
64	February 12, 2015	20.0%	#2	#5	
65	February 13, 2015	19.3%	#2	#3	
66	February 16, 2015	20.1%	#2	#5	
67	February 17, 2015	19.7%	#2	#4	
68	February 18, 2015	18.4%	#2	#5	
69	February 19, 2015	18.5%	#2	#6	
70	February 20, 2015	19.2%	#2	#4	
71	February 23, 2015	19.4%	#2	#3	
72	February 24, 2015	19.8%	#2	#4	
73	February 25, 2015	18.2%	#2	#5	
74	February 26, 2015	17.5%	#2	#6	
75	February 27, 2015	17.9%	#2	#5	
76	March 2, 2015	18.3%	#2	#5	
77	March 3, 2015	17.0%	#2	#8	
78	March 4, 2015	18.3%	#2	#5	
79	March 5, 2015	18.0%	#2	#7	
80	March 6, 2015	19.1%	#2	#4	
