= Together Forever (TV series) =

2012 Philippine television drama series

- Title card
- Genre: Romance; Comedy drama
- Developed by: Onay Sales
- Written by: Rona Sales; Marlon Miguel; John Borgy Danao; Jason Lim; Liberty Trinidad; Cyril Ramos
- Directed by: Roderick Lindayag
- Creative director: Jun Lana
- Starring: Julie Anne San Jose; Elmo Magalona
- Opening theme: "Together Forever" by Julie Anne San Jose and Elmo Magalona
- Country of origin: Philippines
- Original language: Tagalog
- No. of episodes: 13

Production
- Executive producer: Joseph Aleta
- Production locations: Manila, Philippines
- Cinematography: Patrick José Ferrer
- Camera setup: Multiple-camera setup
- Running time: 30–42 minutes
- Production company: GMA Entertainment TV

Original release
- Network: GMA Network
- Release: June 17 – September 9, 2012

Together Forever is a 2012 Philippine television drama comedy romance series broadcast by GMA Network. The series is a spin-off from Red Mask, a Philippine short film aired on Party Pilipinas. Directed by Roderick Lindayag, it stars Julie Anne San Jose and Elmo Magalona. It premiered on June 17, 2012 on the network's Sunday afternoon line up. The series concluded on September 9, 2012, with a total of 13 episodes.

The series is streaming online on YouTube.

== Cast and characters ==
Cast

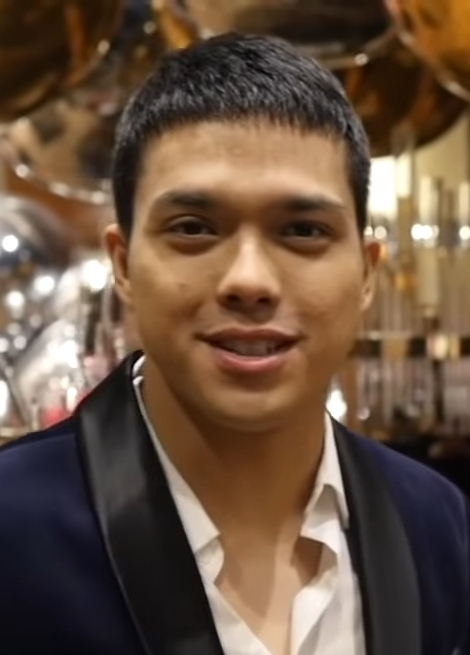
Elmo Magalona

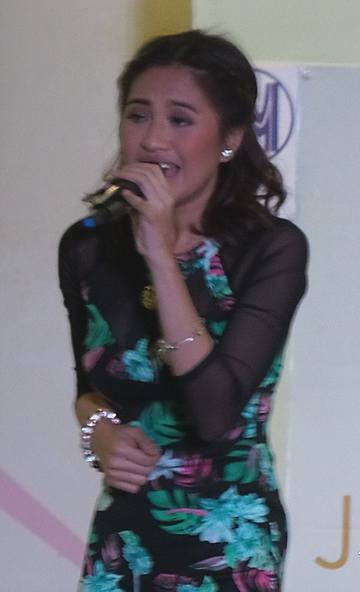
Julie Anne San Jose

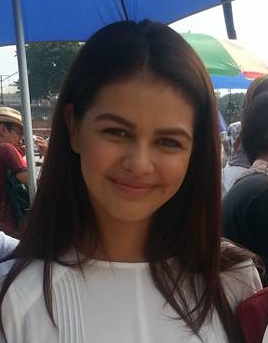
Janine Gutierrez

Lead cast

- Elmo Magalona as Ely Trinidad
- Julie Anne San Jose as Antoinette "Toyang" Escueta

Supporting cast

- Janine Gutierrez as Jasmine "Jas" Trinidad
- Renz Valerio as Rasputin "Raz" Trinidad
- Lexi Fernandez as Shirley Custoya
- Enzo Pineda as Angelo delos Santos
- Steven Silva as Cholo Limuanco
- Benedict Campos as Ben Dizon
- Sef Cadayona as Jefferson "Jepoy" Teodoro
- Patricia Ysmael as Gay
- Jackie Lou Blanco as Evelyn Trinidad

Guest cast

- Aljur Abrenica as Santiago "Yago" Carion
- Sam Pinto as Samantha "Sam"
- Matthew Mendoza as Mark Trinidad
- Lovely Rivero as Andrea Trinidad
- Maricel Morales as Angelo's mother

== Ratings ==
According to AGB Nielsen Philippines' Mega Manila household television ratings, the pilot episode of Together Forever earned a 10.8% rating. The final episode scored a 7.5% rating.

== Accolades ==
Accolades received by Together Forever
Year	Award	Category	Recipient	Result	Ref.
2012	26th PMPC Star Awards for Television	Best New Female TV Personality	Janine Gutierrez	Nominated	
2012	26th PMPC Star Awards for Television	Best Youth Oriented Program	Together Forever	Nominated	
