= Diva Montelaba =

Filipino actress

- Born: Hyacienth Diva Mantalaba; January 14, 1991 (age 35); Cebu City, Philippines
- Education: University of San Jose–Recoletos
- Occupation: Actress
- Years active: 2009–2019
- Height: 5 ft 5.6 in (167 cm)

Hyacienth Diva Mantalaba (born January 14, 1991), better known as Diva Montelaba, is a Filipino actress. She was one of the Final Five in the fifth season of StarStruck, a reality-based talent search show of GMA Network in the Philippines and finished as first runner-up (First Princess).

== Early life ==
She lived in Minglanilla, Cebu before moving to Metro Manila.

== Filmography ==
=== Television ===
Year	Title	Role
2010	Sine Novela: Ina, Kasusuklaman Ba Kita?	Diva
2010	Jillian: Namamasko Po!	Sarah
2011	Time of My Life	Lally
2011	Ikaw Lang ang Mamahalin	Young Lilian Avelino-Fuentebella
2011	Ruben Marcelino's Kokak	Cheenee Macagaling
2012	Faithfully	Osang
2012	Aso ni San Roque	Ruka
2012	Temptation of Wife	Darlene Armada
2013	Pahiram ng Sandali	Nenita "Kimberly" Labastida
2013	Maghihintay Pa Rin	Milan
2014	Adarna	Raya / Fake Ada
2014	Villa Quintana	Yvette Carillo
2014	Ang Dalawang Mrs. Real	Liza Salazar
2015	Marimar	Kendra Dela Paz
2015	Second Chances	Samantha "Sam" Martinez
2015	My Mother's Secret	Lorraine De Leon
2015	Beautiful Strangers	Georgia Lacsamana
2016	That's My Amboy	Rebecca "Becky" Almeda
2016	Poor Señorita	Minerva
2016	Alyas Robin Hood	Amaya
2016–2017	Sa Piling ni Nanay	Rose
2017	Haplos	Gwendolyn "Wendy" Reyes
2017	Daig Kayo ng Lola Ko	Adriana
2017	Kambal, Karibal	Linda
2018	The Cure	Suzy
2019	Prima Donnas	Carla
2019	Beautiful Justice	Melanie

==== Television anthologies ====
Year	Title	Role
2010	Maynila: Circle of Love	Belle
2010	Maynila:	Joy
2010	Love Bug Presents: Exchange of Hearts	Barbie
2010	Maynila: The New Girl	Karen
2012	Maynila: Love Best Policy	Isabelle
2012	Spooky Nights: Korona	
2013	Maynila: Summer of Love	Janine
2013	Maynila: Coffee Princess	Tina
2013	Magpakailanman: Kislap ng Parol	Jackie
2014	Wagas: Jopay & Joshua Love Story	Jopay Paguia-Zamora
2015	Magpakailanman: Rehas ng Pag-ibig	Liza
2015	Magpakailanman: My Teacher, My Rapist	Cindy
2015	Magpakailanman: Ang sakripisyo ng isang ina: The Nancy Cañares Story	Jona
2015	Imbestigador: #DivaOnImbestigador	Marivic
2015	Maynila: Love is Gold	Ellen
2015	Maynila: Substitute for Love	
2015	Karelasyon: Webcam	Gina
2016	Magpakailanman: Ang Lihim ni Rovie	Fatima
2016	Karelasyon: Misyonero	Baning
2016	A1 Ko Sa 'Yo	Pia
2016	Magpakailanman: Sa Malas at Swerte	Ria
2016	Magpakailanman: Davao Bombing: Mga kuwento ng pag-asa	Kyla
2017	Tadhana: Aishiteiru	Jessa
2018	Tadhana: Magkasalo	Lydia
2018	Tadhana: Kumare	Rita

As herself

Year	Title	Role
2010	StarStruck	Herself / First Princess
2010–2013	Party Pilipinas	Herself / Performer
2013	Sunday All Stars	Herself / Performer

=== Film ===
Year	Title	Role
2012	Just One Summer	Jillian
2015	My Bebe Love: #KiligPaMore	Madette
2020	Bully'Kang: The First Adventure	Vika

Awards and achievements
Preceded by Rich Asuncion; Kris Bernal	StarStruck; Runner-up; 2009 (season 5)	Succeeded by Ayra Mariano
