= Just One Summer =

- Theatrical movie poster
- Directed by: Mac C. Alejandre
- Screenplay by: Onay Sales
- Story by: Emman dela Cruz; Bei Fausto
- Produced by: Jose Mari Abacan; Annette Gozon-Abrogar
- Starring: Julie Anne San Jose; Elmo Magalona
- Cinematography: Daniel 'Toto' Uy
- Edited by: Tara Illenberger
- Music by: Von de Guzman
- Production company: GMA Films
- Distributed by: GMA Films
- Release date: August 15, 2012
- Running time: 110 minutes
- Country: Philippines
- Languages: Filipino; English
- Box office: ₱6,155,778.00

Just One Summer is a 2012 Filipino romance-drama film directed by Mac Alejandre. The film stars Julie Anne San Jose and Elmo Magalona.

The film is streaming online on YouTube.

== Plot ==
A rich, rebellious boy spends the summer with his father who he has considered long dead and his mistress while waiting for the annulment of his father and his mother's marriage. During his stay with his father during the summer, he meets a poor girl who is his childhood friend and is a scholar of whom her family is depending on; however, she is holding in a secret with regards to the true state of her scholarship. The two meet and comfort each other amidst their problems and they fall for each other as time goes on and as they get to know each other.

== Cast ==
- Elmo Magalona as Daniel "Niel" Luna Cuaresma, Jr.
- Julie Anne San Jose as Maria Bettina "Beto" Reyes Salazar
- Alice Dixson as Irene Luna-Cuaresma – Nyel's mother
- Joel Torre as Daniel Cuaresma, Sr. – Nyel's father
- Cherry Pie Picache as Juliet
- Buboy Garovillo as Berting Salazar – Beto's father
- Gloria Romero as Lola Meding Reyes
- Sheena Halili as Epang
- Steven Silva as Joseph
- Diva Montelaba as Jillian
- Lexi Fernandez as Shaina
- Jhoana Marie Tan as Samantha
- Ken Chan as Francis
- Sef Cadayona as Jason
- Benedict Campos
- Ana Feleo
- Mon Confiado as Ramon
- Betong Sumaya
- Maey Bautista
- Mega Unciano

== Production ==
In August 2011, it was announced that the JuliElmo tandem will have a movie, after their successful team-up for their first acting project Andres de Saya. The movie was temporarily postponed due to their work in Daldalita. The director has been busy with Amaya and TV5's Nandito Ako as well. On March 8, 2012, shooting resumed. The movie was shot in Bulacan and Laguna. As of June/July 2012, the movie is in post-production and the stars are dubbing their voices and recording the songs to be used for the film.

== Theme song ==
The theme song of the film, entitled Bakit Ba Ganyan sung by Julie Anne San Jose, was originally interpreted by Dina Bonnevie backed by VST & Co. It was also covered by Tito Sotto, Vic Sotto and Joey de Leon in a Chinese version.
