= My Mother's Secret =

2015 Philippine television drama series

- Title card
- Genre: Drama
- Created by: Renei Dimla
- Written by: John Kenneth de Leon; Renei Dimla; Evie Macapujay
- Directed by: Neal Del Rosario
- Creative director: Roy Iglesias
- Starring: Kim Rodriguez; Gwen Zamora
- Theme music composer: Anne Margaret R. Figueroa
- Opening theme: "Sa'Yo Lang ang Aking Puso" by Christian Bautista
- Country of origin: Philippines
- Original language: Tagalog
- No. of episodes: 54

Production
- Executive producer: Michele R. Borja
- Editors: Donard Robles; Jaybe Maquiran; Bot Tana
- Camera setup: Multiple-camera setup
- Running time: 18–24 minutes
- Production company: GMA Entertainment TV

Original release
- Network: GMA Network
- Release: May 25 – August 7, 2015

My Mother's Secret is a 2015 Philippine television drama series broadcast by GMA Network. Directed by Neal del Rosario, it stars Kim Rodriguez and Gwen Zamora in the title role. It premiered on May 25, 2015 on the network's Telebabad line up. The series concluded on August 7, 2015, with a total of 54 episodes.

The series is streaming online on YouTube.

== Premise ==
Neri's dream is a good life with her mother, Cora. Due to unexpected circumstances, she meets the couple, Vivian and Anton, who adopt her and send her to school. This changes her life and she learns that Vivian is her real mother.

== Cast and characters ==
Cast

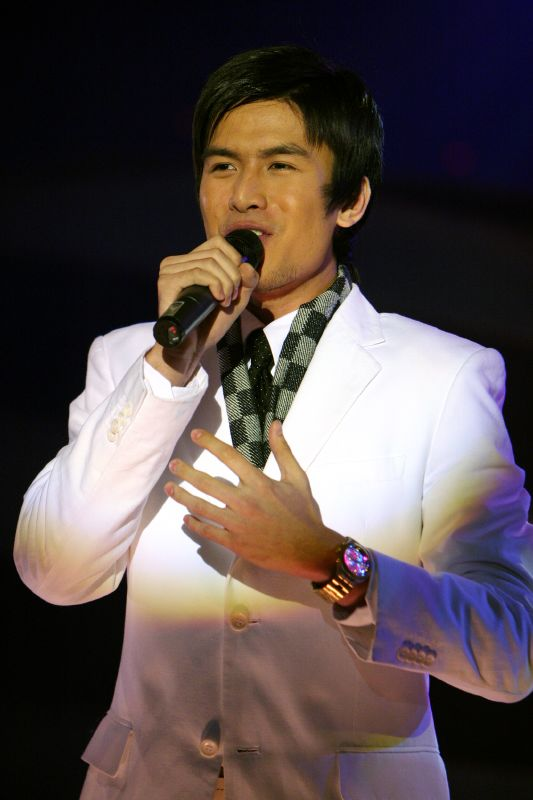
Christian Bautista

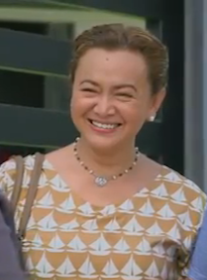
Sharmaine Buencamino

Lead cast

- Kim Rodriguez as Nerissa "Neri" Pastor-Guevarra
- Gwen Zamora as Vivian Pastor-Guevarra

Supporting cast

- Christian Bautista as Anton Guevarra
- Lotlot De Leon as Cora Macapugay
- Kiko Estrada as Craig de Leon
- Shamaine Centenera-Buencamino as Esther Guevarra
- Meryll Soriano as Stella Pastor
- Enzo Pineda as Gavin de Leon
- Diva Montelaba as Lorraine de Leon
- Jhoana Marie Tan as Karen Pastor Lopez
- Frances Makil-Ignacio as Chato de Villa
- Ervic Vijandre as Edwin Lopez
- Tricia Cabais as Heidi P. Guevarra / Heidi P. Lopez

Guest cast

- Mark Herras as Migs San Real
- Sam Pinto as Lucy Arevalo
- Caprice Cayetano as younger Nerisa "Neri" Guevarra
- Richard Quan as Bernard
- Mike Lloren as Luis
- Coleen Perez as Paula
- Miggs Cuaderno as Mac

== Ratings ==
My Mother's Secret ratings
No.	Original air date	AGB Nielsen Mega Manila household ratings
1	May 25, 2015	9.7%
2	May 26, 2015	10.3%
3	May 27, 2015	9.5%
4	May 28, 2015	10.2%
5	May 29, 2015	10.1%
6	June 1, 2015	9.6%
7	June 2, 2015	8.5%
8	June 3, 2015	8.9%
9	June 4, 2015	7.3%
10	June 5, 2015	10.1%
11	June 8, 2015	8.5%
12	June 9, 2015	10.8%
13	June 10, 2015	9.1%
14	June 11, 2015	8.6%
15	June 12, 2015	7.5%
16	June 15, 2015	8.8%
17	June 16, 2015	10.1%
18	June 17, 2015	11.5%
19	June 18, 2015	9.7%
20	June 19, 2015	11.0%
21	June 22, 2015	10.1%
22	June 23, 2015	10.6%
23	June 24, 2015	9.2%
24	June 25, 2015	9.3%
25	June 26, 2015	10.6%
26	June 29, 2015	9.0%
27	June 30, 2015	10.0%
28	July 1, 2015	8.7%
29	July 2, 2015	10.3%
30	July 3, 2015	8.8%
31	July 6, 2015	11.6%
32	July 7, 2015	13.8%
33	July 8, 2015	13.0%
34	July 9, 2015	13.3%
35	July 10, 2015	13.2%
36	July 13, 2015	10.9%
37	July 14, 2015	10.2%
38	July 15, 2015	10.3%
39	July 16, 2015	12.0%
40	July 17, 2015	13.2%
41	July 20, 2015	12.0%
42	July 21, 2015	11.2%
43	July 22, 2015	12.7%
44	July 23, 2015	10.3%
45	July 24, 2015	14.4%
46	July 28, 2015	13.2%
47	July 29, 2015	11.3%
48	July 30, 2015	11.9%
49	July 31, 2015	9.9%
50	August 3, 2015	11.5%
51	August 4, 2015	11.7%
52	August 5, 2015	11.5%
53	August 6, 2015	14.0%
54	August 7, 2015	11.5%
