= G.R.I.N.D. Get Ready It's a New Day =

2017 Philippine television drama series

- Title card
- Genre: Drama
- Directed by: Monti Parungao
- Starring: Bruno Gabriel; Jazz Ocampo; Ayra Mariano; Benedict Campos
- Theme music composer: Morningside
- Opening theme: "Life Will Pass You By"
- Country of origin: Philippines
- Original language: Tagalog
- No. of episodes: 10

Production
- Camera setup: Multiple-camera setup
- Running time: 45 minutes
- Production company: Wizpher Mac Productions

Original release
- Network: GMA Network
- Release: August 19 – October 21, 2017

G.R.I.N.D. Get Ready It's a New Day is a 2017 Philippine television drama series broadcast by GMA Network. Directed by Monti Parungao, it stars Bruno Gabriel, Jazz Ocampo, Ayra Mariano, and Benedict Campos. It premiered on August 19, 2017 on the network's Sabado Star Power sa Gabi line up. The series concluded on October 21, 2017, with a total of 10 episodes.

== Cast and characters ==
Lead cast

- Bruno Gabriel as Carlo Yuson
- Jazz Ocampo as Solangermina Tamara "Solanj" Martinez
- Ayra Mariano as Luisa Carmela "Lui" Gonzales
- Benedict Campos as Reynaldo "RK" Katakutan Jr.

Recurring cast

- Nanette Inventor as Lola Azon
- Joanna Marie Katanyag as Flavy

Guest cast

- Kate Alejandrino as Marty
- Jenny Miller as Loretta "Lorry" Diomendes
- Phoebe Gwenette Yor as Yuki
- Princess Ayisha as Ayisha Gonzales
- Joseph Daniel R. Aliazar as Fabio
- David Licauco as Alco
- Gileth Sandico as Amanda Gonzales
- Maureen Larrazabal as Diana Martinez
- Kim Rodriguez as Catherine "Cathy" Cruz
- Lollie Mara as Greta Yuson
- Lui Manansala as Betchay
- Yayo Aguila as Heidi Katakutan
- Ameera Johara as Valeriano "Valerie" Maligalig
- Phytos Ramirez as Alfred
- Rosemarie Sarita as Mrs. Capistrano
- Yasser Marta as Calvin

== Ratings ==
According to AGB Nielsen Philippines' Nationwide Urban Television Audience Measurement People in television homes, the pilot episode of G.R.I.N.D. Get Ready It's a New Day earned a 2% rating. The final episode scored a 1.8% rating.
