= Benedict Campos =

Filipino actor (born 1991)

Benedict Campos Kaw
- Born: Benedict Campos; January 2, 1991 (age 35); Makati, Philippines
- Other name: Ben
- Occupations: Actor, model, swimmer
- Years active: 2008–present

Benedict Campos Kaw is a Filipino television, film and theater actor, model and swimmer. He was born January 2, 1991, in Makati, Philippines. He is currently working as an exclusive talent of GMA Network.

== Background ==
After graduating with a degree in political science in De La Salle University, Benedict Campos decided he was going to be an actor.

When in college he appeared in a number of television commercials and when he got his diploma, Benedict became an actor. He met Betchay Nakpil, who agreed to become his official manager together with GMA Talent Development and Management Department (formerly GMA Artist Center).

When GMA Network was holding auditions for its primetime series, Grazilda, Campos tried his luck and landed the coveted role of Cinderella's Prince Charming.

Campos, a member of the varsity swim team from high school (Xavier School) to college (De La Salle University), said he would have been happy just to be in the cast. He couldn't believe he actually landed a major role.

Campos admitted that he has no intention of becoming a lawyer, even in the future. His parents seem happy with his decision. Their son finished college and that's enough for mom and dad.

The next year, Campos lay low in television series and become busy in a series of workshops and theatre via stage play Noli Me Tangere where he played the role of Padre Salvi, a deceiving and scheming priest that will do everything to harvest the most forbidden of fruits, which is Maria Clara, the lady protagonist. The same year, 2011, he became part of Cosmopolitan Magazine’s 69 Cosmo Bachelor Bash.

2012, Campos became part of the movie My Kontrabida Girl, which starred Aljur Abrenica and Rhian Ramos and directed by Jade Castro; television series such as the hit primetime teledramas Legacy (cameo role) and Makapiling Kang Muli, which he starred as Carla Abellana’s younger brother; and the hit weekly teen-oriented drama Together Forever where he played the role of Ben Dizon.

== Filmography ==
=== Television ===
Year	Title	Role
2017	G.R.I.N.D. Get Ready It's A New Day	Reynaldo "RK" Catacutan Jr.
2015	Karelasyon: Mama's Boy	Rocky
2014	Magkano Ba ang Pag-ibig?	Bryce Macaraeg Buenaventura
2013	Mundo Mo'y Akin	Aaron Morales
2012	Together Forever	Ben Dizon
2012	Makapiling Kang Muli	Keiffer Angeles †
2012	The Good Daughter	Hans
2012	Legacy	Young Rowell
2010	Grazilda	Prince Charming
2021	Init sa Magdamag	Bryan

=== Film ===
Year	Title	Role
2012	Just One Summer	TBA
2012	My Kontrabida Girl	Henry
2009	Bente	Mervin's cousin
