= Jazz Ocampo =

Filipina actress and commercial model

- Born: Jazzmin Leslie Ocampo McDonald; December 17, 1997 (age 28); Las Piñas City, Metro Manila, Philippines
- Occupations: Actress, commercial model
- Years active: 2010–present
- Employer(s): GMA Network (television); Regal Entertainment (film)
- Agents: Talent5 (2010–2014) Star Magic (2014–2015); GMA Artist Center (2015–2019)
- Website: http://instagram.com/ocampojazz

Jazzmin Leslie Ocampo McDonald (born December 17, 1997, in Las Piñas, Metro Manila, Philippines), known professionally as Jazz Ocampo, is a Filipino actress and commercial model. She was a contract artist of GMA Network.

== Career ==
Ocampo's father is half-American while her mother is half-Spanish, which explains her mestiza looks. She started doing commercials at a very young age before she launched her acting career through TV5's Star Factor. She would later appear in several of TV5's television series while doing commercials for several companies like KFC, Master Oil Control with Zero Oil with James Reid, Pond's and Samsung.

In spite of her acting commitments, Ocampo still attends regular school and even brings her school assignments to work and reads in between tapings.

== Filmography ==
=== Film ===
Year	Title	Role	Director
2018	Santet: Black Magic	Aaliyah	Helfi C.H. Kardit

=== Television ===
Year	Title	Role
2010	Star Factor	Herself
2011	Star Confessions	Grace
2011	Bangis	Tweety
2012–2013	Enchanted Garden	Amapola
2013	Istorific Pidol's Kwentong Fantastik	Prinsesa Aurora
2014	Wansapanataym: My App Boyfie	Steffi
2015	Maynila: Moments In Time	Eliza
2015	InstaDad	Maaya / Aya
2015	Maynila: Edi Wow	Leslie
2015	Magpakailanman: Ang Huling Laro ng Aking Anak	Kristine
2015	My Faithful Husband	Carla Dela Paz
2015	Maynila: Lola Madonna	Geleen
2015	Maynila: Bilango ng Kahapon	Poblarde
2015	Magpakailanman: Don't Chat With Strangers	Rica
2016	That's My Amboy	Trina Dominguez
2016	Maynila: Secret Bratinella	Frelyn
2016	Sinungaling Mong Puso	Hanna Arellano
2017	Daig Kayo ng Lola Ko	Georgina
2017	G.R.I.N.D. Get Ready It's a New Day	Solangermina Tamara "Solanj" Martinez
2017	Mulawin vs. Ravena	Marga
2018	Super Ma'am	Mamba
2018	My Guitar Princess	Katy Garcia
2018	My Special Tatay	Erika
