= Bryan Benedict =

Filipino actor and model

- Born: Bryan Benedict M. Anastacio; September 27, 1993 (age 32); San Juan, Philippines
- Education: Far Eastern University
- Occupations: Actor, model
- Years active: 2012–present
- Agent: Freelance
- Height: 5 ft 9 in (1.75 m)

Bryan Benedict M. Anastacio (born September 27, 1993), known professionally as Bryan Benedict, is a Filipino actor and model. He was a contestant in Protégé: The Battle For The Big Artista Break, a reality TV series. He is a Magna cum laude graduate of BSC Tourism Management in the Far Eastern University and currently working as a freelance actor and a part-time college professor.

== Early life and education ==
Benedict was raised in San Juan. His father is deaf-mute while his mother is deaf. He communicates to his parents via sign language. During his high school, Bryan was a drop-out. He later transferred to a Claro M. Recto High School where he graduated as first honor. He studied Information Technology at Pamantasan ng Lungsod ng Maynila as a scholar. He then took up Tourism at the Far Eastern University and graduated as magna cum laude.

== Modeling and acting career ==
Benedict started print and ramp modeling on 2008. Benedict was one of Cosmopolitan Philippine's bachelors on 2008 and 2010.

On 2012, Benedict joined GMA Network's Protégé: The Battle For The Big Artista Break, a reality based artista search as one of the finalists from Visayas. Bryan was originally a protégé of Jolina Magdangal but due to a twist of the show, Ricky Davao became his new mentor. Benedict was eliminated from the competition on the ninth gala night, becoming the TV show’s eighth placer.

After Protégé, Benedict starred in various programs of the network.

On 2014, Benedict returned as one of the bachelors on Cosmo Bachelor Bash.

Benedict portrayed Juan Luna, a Filipino painter, sculptor and a political activist of the Philippine Revolution during the late 19th century, in the 2014 docudrama Ilustrado.

== Personal life and other careers ==
Benedict currently resides in San Juan, Metro Manila.

Before joining Protégé: The Battle For The Big Artista Break, Benedict worked as a dealer in a casino in Cebu.

Benedict is currently a part-time Tourism and HRM instructor at University of the East-Manila.

== Filmography ==
=== Television ===
==== Drama ====
| Year | Title | Role |
|---|---|---|
| 2013 | With a Smile | Elvis |
| 2014 | Carmela | Leo |
| 2014-2016 | Magpakailanman | Various roles |
| 2014 | Ilustrado | Juan Luna |
| 2014 | More Than Words | Emerson |
| 2015 | Yagit | Andoy |
| 2015 | The Rich Man's Daughter | Gerald |
| 2015-2017 | Imbestigador | Various roles |
| 2015-2017 | Maynila | Various roles |
| 2015 | Destiny Rose | Stephen |
| 2015 | Dangwa | Rene |
| 2015-2017 | Wish Ko Lang | Various roles |
| 2016 | That's My Amboy | Itoy (uncredited) |
| 2016 | Karelasyon | Various roles |
| 2016 | Poor Señorita | Gino Dizon (uncredited) |
| 2016 | A1 Ko Sa 'Yo | Joey |
| 2016-2017 | Dear Uge | Various roles |
| 2016 | Calle Siete | Caleb |
| 2016 | Usapang Real Love: Relationship Goals | Will |
| 2017 | Ika-6 na Utos | Nato |
| 2017 | My Love from the Star | Potenciano Infante |
| 2017 | Mulawin vs. Ravena | Ningas |
| 2018 | Ang Forever Ko'y Ikaw | Geraldo Roque |
| 2019 | Beautiful Justice | Drug Pusher |
| 2019-2020 | Madrasta | Elvis |
| 2021 | Nagbabagang Luha | Lander |
| 2023 | Black Rider | Rival Syndicate Group Member |

==== Reality, variety and talk shows ====
| Year | Title | Notes |
|---|---|---|
| 2009 | Eat Bulaga! | Mr. and Ms. EB University winner |
| 2012 | Protégé: The Battle For The Big Artista Break | Himself/Contestant |
| 2012 | Nay-1-1 | Himself/Guest |
| 2012-2017 | MARS | Himself/Guest |
| 2013-2016 | Taste Buddies | Himself/Guest |
| 2016 | Sunday PinaSaya | Himself/Guest |
| 2017 | Full House Tonight | Himself/Guest |

== See also ==
- Mikoy Morales
- Ruru Madrid
