= Lance Serrano =

Filipino actor, commercial model and nurse

- Born: Lance Mendoza Serrano; May 22, 1992 (age 33); Mandaluyong, Philippines
- Other names: Lance, Kap Lanz
- Occupations: Actor, model, basketball player, commercial model
- Years active: 2008–present
- Agents: Star Magic (2009—2012; 2018–present) GMA Artist Center (2013–2018); APT Entertainment
- Known for: Randy in Because of You; Memfes in Encantadia (2016) PBA D-League

Lance Mendoza Serrano (born May 22, 1992) is a Filipino actor, commercial model and basketball player, Serrano has multiple TV shows on GMA Network.

== Career ==
After graduating and receiving his professional license as a nurse in the Philippines, Lance Serrano became part of ABS-CBN before he appeared on its rival network GMA. Serrano was on contract at Star Magic (2009) then transferred to GMA Artist Center in 2013. He's known for his role as Steve in Galema: Anak ni Zuma. He's a commercial model, appearing in Emperador Light, Judge, Smart, Globe, Yamaha Jollibee and countless other TV and Digital commercials. He was also part of Demigod for hunk modeling, BENCH uncut, BENCH Universe, COSMO BACHELORS, Philippine Fashion Week. His first guesting at a talk show was in The Ryzza Mae Show appearing alongside best child host for 2013 Ryzza Mae Dizon. He was also included in the Telefantasya series, Encantadia alongside on-screen partner "Gabbi Garcia", wherein he played the Adamyan Memfes who was the loveteam of Alena. He also played for 2 years in the PBA D League in teams such as AMA Online Education Titans where he scored 13 points in the 4th quarter and Hazchem Green for 2 years and 3 seasons.

== Television ==
Year	Title	Role
2013	The Ryzza Mae Show	Himself/Guest
2013–2014	Galema: Anak ni Zuma	Steve
2015	Pepito Manaloto	Himself/Guest
2015	Maynila: Hugot Pa More	
2015	The Rich Man's Daughter	Leo
2015	My Faithful Husband	Benjo
2015	Maynila: My Angels, My Valentines	
2015	Maynila: Feelingera Na, Assumera Pa	
2015	Love Hotline	With Arianne Bautista
2015–2016	Because of You	Randy
2016	Naku, Boss Ko!	Andrei
2017	Encantadia	Memfes (Adamya's Kingdom)
2017	#Magpakailanman: ErwinDayrit	Roy
2018	Maynila: Ganti ng Anak	Ricky
2018–2019	FPJ's Ang Probinsyano	PS/Insp. Cruz
2022	Tadhana: Taylong Dalawa	Orlando

== TV Commercials / basketball career ==
- Emperador Light
- Judge (Chewing Gum)
- Jollibee
- Uratex Monoblock
- AMA TITANS
- HAZCHEM
