= Stephanie Sol =

Filipino actress

- Born: Stephanie Sol; January 22, 1990 (age 36); Cagayan de Oro, Philippines
- Occupations: Actress, model, TV host
- Years active: 2012–present
- Agents: Talent5 (2012); GMA Artist Center (2012-present)
- Known for: Sinungaling Mong Puso; Meant to Be

Stephanie Sol (born January 22, 1990) is a Filipina actress. She is known for her roles as Abby Reyes-Luna in The Rich Man's Daughter and Belle Acosta in More Than Words. She is currently under contract with GMA Artist Center of GMA.

== Life and career ==
Stephanie Sol was born in 1990 in Cagayan de Oro, Philippines, and studied at the University of Asia and the Pacific.

She began her career as a television commercial model, and has since been cast in a number of GMA Network TV series, including Meant To Be, the TV series that made her rise to fame, The Rich Man's Daughter, Alyas Robin Hood, and notably in Sinungaling Mong Puso.

== Filmography ==
=== Television / Digital Series ===
| Year | Title | Role | Notes |
|---|---|---|---|
| 2012 | Kapitan Awesome | Lana Hiya | |
| 2012 | Cielo de Angelina | Perlita Zulueta | |
| 2013–2015 | Sunday All Stars | Herself | TV / Co-Host |
| 2014 | Carmela | Mithi Balaguer | |
| 2014 | Niño | Magda | |
| 2014 | Magpakailanman | Mary Anne | Episode Guest: "Mag-Inang Aborsiyonista" |
| 2014 | Sa Puso ni Dok | Carla | |
| 2014 | More Than Words | Isabelle "Belle" Acosta | |
| 2015 | The Rich Man's Daughter | Abby Reyes-Luna | |
| 2015 | Juan Tamad | Anicka Gandahan | |
| 2015 | Karelasyon | Mira | Episode Guest: "Kasambahay" |
| 2015 | Imbestigador | Jasmine | Episode Guest: "Ang Kwento ni Jasmine" |
| 2015 | Karelasyon | Sofia | Episode Guest: "Laro" |
| 2015 | Magpakailanman | Marie | Episode Guest: "Isang Mister, Limang Asawa" |
| 2015–2016 | Little Nanay | Antonietta "Teacher Tony" Ramirez-Batongbuhay | |
| 2016 | Karelasyon | Kris | Episode Guest: "Rigodon" |
| 2016 | The Millionaire's Wife | Georgia Samson | |
| 2016 | Karelasyon | Angel | Episode Guest: "Live In" |
| 2016 | Sinungaling Mong Puso | Camilla Ganzon | |
| 2016 | Karelasyon | Vanni | Episode Guest: "Ambisiyosa" |
| 2016 | Imbestigador | Ella | |
| 2016 | Usapang Real Love | Angel | Episode Guest: "Relationship Goals: (Parts 1 / 4) |
| 2017 | Meant to Be | Carmina "Cacai" Bahaghari | |
| 2017 | Karelasyon | Lovely | Episode Guest: "Perfect Woman" |
| 2017 | Magpakailanman | Nina Teberio | Episode Guest: "Reyna ng Tubig" |
| 2017 | Alyas Robin Hood | Rhodora | |
| 2018 | Contessa | Lara | |
| 2024 | Black Rider | Charlie | |
