= Maynila (TV program) =

Philippine television drama series

- Title card from 2017 to 2020
- Also known as: Maynila: Larawan ng Bansa; Maynila: Ito ang Kwento Mo; Maynila: Kwento. Buhay. Tagumpay.
- Genre: Romantic drama
- Written by: Sara San Luis; Rouel Alciraz; Theresa Guevarra
- Directed by: G. Phil M. Noble
- Presented by: Lito Atienza
- Opening theme: "Mahal Kong Maynila" by Kakai Bautista and Vince De Jesus; "Maynila" by Noel Cabangon
- Country of origin: Philippines
- Original language: Tagalog
- No. of episodes: (list of episodes)

Production
- Executive producers: Alessandra A. Beltran; Lani Atienza
- Production locations: Manila, Philippines
- Camera setup: Multiple-camera setup
- Running time: 30–60 minutes
- Production company: Maynilad Platinum Productions Inc.

Original release
- Network: GMA Network
- Release: December 13, 1999 – August 1, 2020

Maynila (transl. Manila) is a Philippine television drama romance anthology series broadcast by GMA Network. Hosted by Lito Atienza, it premiered on December 13, 1999 on network's weekday afternoon line up. The series concluded on August 1, 2020.

The series is streaming online on YouTube.

== Premise ==
Presented as an anthology, Maynila is a series of inspiring stories of people with everyday challenges that affect the resident of Manila.

== Hosts ==
- Lito Atienza
- Ali Atienza
- Chi Atienza-Valdepenas (2004; 2016–20)

== Production ==
Principal photography was halted in March 2020 due to the enhanced community quarantine in Luzon caused by the COVID-19 pandemic. The show resumed its programming on July 11, 2020.

== Accolades ==
Accolades received by Maynila
Year	Award	Category	Recipient	Result	Ref.
2000	Catholic Mass Media Awards	Best Drama Series	Maynila	Nominated	
2000	14th PMPC Star Awards for Television	Best Drama Anthology	Maynila	Nominated	
2001	Catholic Mass Media Awards	Best Drama Series	Maynila	Nominated	
2001	15th PMPC Star Awards for Television	Best Drama Anthology	Maynila	Nominated	
2002	Catholic Mass Media Awards	Best Drama Series	Maynila	Nominated	
2002	16th PMPC Star Awards for Television	Best Drama Anthology	Maynila	Nominated	
2003	Catholic Mass Media Awards	Best Drama Series	Maynila	Nominated	
2004	Catholic Mass Media Awards	Best Drama Series	Maynila	Nominated	
2005	Catholic Mass Media Awards	Best Drama Series	Maynila	Nominated	
2006	Anak TV Seal Awards		Maynila	Won	
2006	Catholic Mass Media Awards	Best Drama Series	Maynila	Nominated	
2006	20th PMPC Star Awards for Television	Best Drama Anthology	Maynila	Nominated	
2007	Catholic Mass Media Awards	Best Drama Series	Maynila	Nominated	
2007	21st PMPC Star Awards for Television	Best Drama Anthology	Maynila	Nominated	
2008	Catholic Mass Media Awards	Best Drama Series	Maynila	Nominated	
2008	22nd PMPC Star Awards for Television	Best Drama Anthology	Maynila	Nominated	
2009	Catholic Mass Media Awards	Best Drama Series	Maynila	Nominated	
2009	23rd PMPC Star Awards for Television	Best Drama Anthology	Maynila	Nominated	
2010	Catholic Mass Media Awards	Best Drama Series	Maynila	Nominated	
2010	24th PMPC Star Awards for Television	Best Drama Anthology	Maynila	Nominated	
2011	Catholic Mass Media Awards	Best Drama Series	Maynila	Nominated	
2011	25th PMPC Star Awards for Television	Best Drama Anthology	Maynila	Nominated	
2012	26th PMPC Star Awards for Television	Best Drama Anthology	Maynila	Nominated	
2012	The First Stars Night Out by Artist Handlers Group	Certificate of Recognition	Maynila	Won	
2013	Catholic Mass Media Awards	Best Drama Series	Maynila	Nominated	
2013	27th PMPC Star Awards for Television	Best Drama Anthology	Maynila	Nominated	
2013	27th PMPC Star Awards for Television	Best New Male TV Personality	Ruru Madrid ("Faith in Love")	Won	
2014	Catholic Mass Media Awards	Best Drama Series	Maynila	Nominated	
2014	28th PMPC Star Awards for Television	Best Drama Anthology	Maynila	Nominated	
2015	Catholic Mass Media Awards	Best Drama Series	Maynila	Nominated	
2015	29th PMPC Star Awards for Television	Best Drama Anthology	Maynila	Nominated	
2016	Catholic Mass Media Awards	Best Drama Series	Maynila	Nominated	
2016	30th PMPC Star Awards for Television	Best Drama Anthology	Maynila	Nominated	
2017	Catholic Mass Media Awards	Best Drama Series	Maynila	Nominated	
2017	31st PMPC Star Awards for Television	Best Drama Anthology	Maynila	Nominated	
2017	31st PMPC Star Awards for Television	Longest Running Drama Anthology	Maynila	Won	
2018	32nd PMPC Star Awards for Television	Best Drama Anthology	Maynila	Nominated	
2021	34th PMPC Star Awards for Television	Best Drama Anthology	Maynila	Nominated	
