= List of Alyas Robin Hood characters =

Alyas Robin Hood (lit. 'Alias Robin Hood' / English title: Bow of Justice) is a Philippine drama-action series broadcast by GMA Network starring Dingdong Dantes, Megan Young, Andrea Torres, Solenn Heussaff and Ruru Madrid. It premiered on September 19, 2016 on GMA Telebabad primetime block and also aired worldwide on GMA Pinoy TV. The first season ended its 23-week run on February 24, 2017, with a total of 115 episodes, and was replaced by Destined to be Yours. A second and final season premiered on August 14, 2017 replacing My Love from the Star, and ended its 15-week run on November 24, 2017, with a total of 75 episodes, and was replaced by Kambal, Karibal.

== Cast and Characters (Season 1) ==
=== Main cast ===
- Dingdong Dantes as Jose Paulo "Pepe" de Jesus Jr./Alyas Robin Hood/Christopher "Chris" Bonifacio
- Megan Young as Sarri Acosta
- Andrea Torres as Venus Torralba/Clara Bonifacio

=== Supporting cast ===
- Sid Lucero as Dean Balbuena
- Jaclyn Jose as Judy de Jesus
- Cherie Gil as Margarita "Maggie" Balbuena
- Lindsay De Vera as Lizzy de Jesus
- Dave Bornea as Julian Balbuena
- Gary Estrada as Carlos "Caloy" de Jesus
- Dennis Padilla as Wilson Chan
- Gio Alvarez as Jericho "Jekjek" Sumilang
- Paolo Contis as S/Insp. Daniel Acosta

=== Recurring cast ===
- Rey "PJ" Abellana as Leandro Torralba
- Ces Quesada as Mayor Anita "Cha" Escano
- Antonette Garcia as Frida
- Luri Vincent Nalus as Junior "Junjun" Aguilar
- Prince Villanueva as Rex
- Erlinda Villalobos as Julia "Huling" Sumilang
- Caprice Cayetano as Erica "Ecai" Sumilang
- Rob Moya as SPO4 Alex Cruz
- Michael Flores as
  - Llama Pineda
  - Jorrel Pineda
- Anthony Falcon as Chino
- Jade Lopez as Chef Pop/Ariana Grenade
- Pauline Mendoza as Betchay
- John Feir as Armando Estanislao

=== Guest cast ===
- Christopher de Leon as Jose Paolo de Jesus Sr.
- Julius Escarga as young Pepe
- Arjan Jimenez as young Caloy
- Will Ashley de Leon as young Jekjek
- Charles Jacob Briz as young Jojo
- Vic Trio as Tomas Mayuga
- Jay Arcilla as Louie Mayuga
- Tanya Gomez as Chairman Adelita Mayuga
- Sue Prado as Cynthia De Jesus
- Joko Diaz as Mayor Ramon Arguelles
- James Teng as Miggy Arguelles
- Ryza Cenon as Nancy Benitez
- Marnie Lapuz as Maria Benitez
- Dina Bonnevie as Mama Daisy
- Liezel Lopez as Miaka
- Marlann Flores as Honey
- Lucho Ayala as Councilor Paras
- Leanne Bautista as Angela
- Catherine Remperas as Rose
- Diva Montelaba as Amaya
- Joross Gamboa as Jojo
- Tammy Brown as Ariana
- Jenny Catchong as Beyonce
- Crissy Marie Rendon as Rihanna
- Aaron Yanga as Ipe

== Cast and Characters (Season 2) ==
=== Main cast ===
- Dingdong Dantes as Atty. Jose Paulo "Pepe" de Jesus Jr./Atty. Jose Paulo Albano/Alyas Robin Hood
- Andrea Torres as Venus Torralba/Marla Mendoza/Aphrodite Marcelo
- Ruru Madrid as Andres Silang/Yoyo Boy
- Solenn Heussaff as Iris Rebecca Lizeralde

=== Supporting cast ===
- Jaclyn Jose as Kapitana Judy de Jesus/Lola SadAko/Victorina Deogracia y Villadolid
- Edu Manzano as Governor Emilio Albano
- Rey "PJ" Abellana as Leandro Torralba
- Gio Alvarez as Jericho "Jekjek" Sumilang
- Paolo Contis as Senior Inspector Daniel Acosta
- Lindsay de Vera as Lizzy de Jesus
- Dave Bornea as Julian Balbuena
- Gary Estrada as Carlos "Caloy" de Jesus
- Rob Moya as SPO2 Alex Cruz
- Antonette Garcia as Frida
- Luri Vincent Nalus as Junjun
- Jay Manalo as Pablo Rodrigo
- KC Montero as SPO2 Rigor Morales

=== Recurring cast ===
- Super Tekla as Yvonne Lady
- Kiel Rodriguez as SPO4 Brix Sandoval
- Rodjun Cruz as SPO2 Chua
- Valerie Concepcion as Helga Montemayor
- Geleen Eugenio as Yaya Chona
- Kenken Nuyad as Totoy Bingo
- Rochelle Pangilinan as Diana dela Vega
- Prince Villanueva as Rex

=== Flashback Appearances ===
- Sid Lucero as Dean Balbuena
- Cherie Gil as Margarita "Maggie" Balbuena
- Christopher de Leon as Jose Paulo de Jesus, Sr.
- Megan Young as Dr. Sarri Acosta
- Tanya Gomez as Kapitana Adelita Mayuga

=== Guest stars ===
- Empress Schuck as young Judy de Jesus
- Gab de Leon as young Jose Paulo de Jesus Sr.
- Arkin del Rosario as young Governor Emilio Albano
- Hiro Peralta as Miguel Rodrigo
- Ina Feleo as Rosetta Rodrigo
- Elle Ramirez as Reporter Susan Meneses
- Stephanie Sol as Rhodora
- Tess Bomb Maranon as Eloisa
- Jason Francisco as Matias
- Lharby Policarpio as Gerald
- Ces Aldaba as Judge
- Crispin Pineda as Priest
- Joshua Zamora as Benjo
- Norman King as Abog
- Lou Veloso as Tanglaw
- Denise Barbacena as Prisoner 1
- Arny Ross as Prisoner 2
- Mara Alberto as Prisoner 3
- Sheena Halili as Lily
- Phytos Ramirez as Kevin
- Kevin Sagra as Patrick Morales
- Karlo Duterte as Jason
- Gabby Eigenmann as Doc Gabriel
- Lotlot de Leon as Sionnie
- Anette Samin as Missing child
- Kiko Estrada as Iking
- Mikee Quintos as Marya
- Joe Gruta as Lolo Marcelino
- Banjo Romero as Gusting
- Dindo Arroyo as Boss Pacquito Domingo
