= Liezel Lopez =

Filipino actress

- Born: Liezel Marie Arintoc Lopez; October 2, 1997 (age 28); Olongapo, Philippines
- Occupation: Actress
- Years active: 2014–present
- Agent: Sparkle GMA Artist Center (2015–present)

Liezel Marie Arintoc Lopez (born October 2, 1997) is a Filipino actress. She was a finalist at the sixth season of reality talent competition, Starstruck in 2015, and has been signed to GMA Artist Center. She joined the cast of Bubble Gang alongside fellow contestants Analyn Barro and Arra San Agustin. She is currently notable for playing various villainous roles in GMA Network.

== Life and career ==
Prior to joining StarStruck, Lopez was a theater actress and model in her hometown, Olongapo City. Due to financial hardships and her dream to become an actress, Lopez joined Starstruck, where her prowess in acting earned her a spot in the Final 14. After being eliminated alongside Avery Paraiso, she signed an exclusive contract with GMA Artist Center.

== Filmography ==
=== Television series ===
| Year | Title | Role |
|---|---|---|
| 2016 | Magkaibang Mundo | Analyn Perez |
| 2016 | A1 Ko Sa 'Yo | Elevator Girl |
| 2016 | Tsuperhero | Isa |
| 2016 | Alyas Robin Hood | Miaka |
| 2017 | My Love from the Star | Juana Jimenez |
| 2017 | Meant to Be | Bar Swimmer |
| 2017 | Haplos | young Mercedes Bermudez |
| 2017 | My Korean Jagiya | Nadine |
| 2017–2018 | Super Ma'am | Teacher Sonia |
| 2018 | The Stepdaughters | Marigold |
| 2018–2019 | Onanay | Wendy |
| 2019 | Kara Mia | Ellie Garcia |
| 2019 | One Hugot Away: Let Go Na | Karla |
| 2021 | Babawiin Ko ang Lahat | Katrina "Trina" Espejo Salvador |
| 2022 | Return to Paradise | Sabina "Sab" |
| 2022 | TOLS | Ivory |
| 2023 | Voltes V: Legacy | Zandra |
| 2024–2025 | Asawa ng Asawa Ko | Shaira Lozano-Manansala / Audrey |
| 2024–2025 | Walang Matigas na Pulis sa Matinik na Misis | Jacqueline "Jacq" Dela Torre |
| 2024 | Lilet Matias: Attorney-at-Law | young Lorena Sanchez |
| 2025 | Sanggang-Dikit FR | Selena Madrigal |

=== Television anthologies ===
| Year | Title | Role |
|---|---|---|
| 2014 | Maynila: Love in Between | Sally |
| 2014 | Maynila: Spirit of the Heart | Jenny |
| 2014 | Maynila: Lovelier the Second Time | Leslie |
| 2016 | Magpakailanman: I'm Dating a Transgender (The Trixie Maristela Story) | Art's sister |
| 2016 | Maynila: Secret Bratinella | Joana |
| 2016 | Dear Uge: No Way, I'm Gay?! | Jane |
| 2017 | Magpakailanman: Losing Jeffrey, Finding Jayson (The Jayson Tomas Story) | Jennifer |
| 2017 | Magpakailanman: Abot-Kamay ang Pangarap (The Erwin Dayrit Story) | Mindy |
| 2017 | Maynila: Suntok sa Buwan (The Jonison "Joni" Fontanos Story) | Michelle |
| 2017 | Magpakailanman: Ang Makulay na Buhay ni Boobay (The Norman Balbuena Story) | Diana |
| 2017 | Daig Kayo ng Lola Ko: Mariel (Ang Lakwatserang Sirena) | Sirena |
| 2017 | Magpakailanman: Anak Mo, Anak Ko, Anak Natin | Ula |
| 2018 | Maynila: My Doodled Boyfie | Michelle |
| 2018 | Dear Uge: You Drive Me Crazy | Ada's classmate |
| 2018 | Daig Kayo ng Lola Ko: Oh My Genie! | Diane |
| 2018 | Magpakailanman: Our Miracle Baby (The Omi and Gina Rullan Story) | Officemate |
| 2018 | Magpakailanman: Pasan Ko ang aking Ina (The Honelyn and Melanie Ledesma Story) | Tessa |
| 2018 | Maynila: My Standby Lover | Lally |
| 2018 | Dear Uge: Who's Your Daddy? | Angelica |
| 2018 | Magpakailanman: Ang Asawang Naging Kabit | Lani |
| 2019 | Daig Kayo ng Lola Ko: The Amazing Adventures of Super Ging and Harvey | Chickbalang |
| 2019 | Maynila: The Bachelorette | Joy |
| 2019 | Tadhana: Boso | Trixie |
| 2019 | Dear Uge: Mama Madrama | Michelle |
| 2019 | Magpakailanman: Isang Milyong Pasasalamat kay Ina | Clarisse |
| 2019 | Imbestigador: Fidex Therese Maranan Rape-Slay Case | Fidex Therese Maranan |
| 2019 | Dear Uge: Yaya-Manin | Mina |
| 2019 | Maynila: Rainbow Home | Ana |
| 2019 | Magpakailanman: Nagmahal, Nasaktan, Pinagsamantalahan | Grace |
| 2019 | Daig Kayo ng Lola Ko: When the Clock Strikes 12 | Gigi |
| 2020 | Tadhana: Bilanggo ni Madam | Paola |
