= My Fantastic Pag-ibig =

Philippine television drama series

- Title card
- Genre: Drama; Romantic comedy
- Country of origin: Philippines
- Original language: Tagalog

Production
- Camera setup: Multiple-camera setup
- Running time: 50–60 minutes
- Production company: GMA Public Affairs

Original release
- Network: GMA News TV (2021); GTV (2021)
- Release: January 30 – October 30, 2021

My Fantastic Pag-ibig (transl. my fantastic love) is a 2021 Philippine television drama romance anthology series broadcast by GMA News TV and GTV. It premiered on January 30, 2021 on GMA News TV's Saturday evening line up. In February 2021, GMA News TV was rebranded as GTV, with the show being carried over. The show concluded on October 30, 2021.

== Cast and characters ==
Love Wars

- Kim de Leon as Milos / Pido
- Lexi Gonzales as Lovelyn Donato
- Rodjun Cruz as Amadeus / Amado
- Divine Aucina as Freya Cruz
- Maey Bautista as Cher Santos
- Mike Liwag as Jed Reyes

Exchange of Hearts

- Migo Adecer as Popoy
- Kate Valdez as Celine
- Maureen Larrazabal as Chinchin
- Jordan Herrera as Boyet
- Kevin Sagra as Justin
- Karenina Haniel as Grace

Ghosted

- Royce Cabrera as Gio Medina
- Ella Cristofani as Sunshine “Shine” Ilagan
- Philip Lazaro as Dawn
- Long Mejia as Mr. T
- Sue Prado as Helen Medina
- Benedix Ramos as Daniel

Fairy Tale Romance

- Yasser Marta as Nep
- Alex Diaz as Lantis
- Jo Berry as Kabibabe
- Cecil Paz as Bebot
- Skelly Clarkson as Toktok

Trophy Girl

- Arra San Agustin as Mariquit
- Jak Roberto as Baste
- Ashley Ortega as Cassie

Dear Ghostwriter

- Juancho Trivino as Joshua
- Jelai Andres as Purple
- Angeli Nicole Sanoy as Weng
- Terry Gian as Reporter
- Abet Raz as Betchay

Hu Luvs Me Not

- Martin del Rosario as Zach Florencio
- Ayra Mariano as Pink Who / Black Who
- Mikoy Morales as JV Amadeus
- Ara Altamira as Roxy Florencio

Fallen

- Althea Ablan as Bituin
- Prince Clemente as Yloon / Kunzumi
- Giselle Sanchez as Eva
- Dayara Shane as Venus
- Rob Sy as Joe

Ganda Problems

- Ayeesha Cervantes as Barang / Barbara
- Paul Salas as Hector
- Crystal Paras as Fantasia
- Lovely Rivero as Mama Grace

Invisiboi

- Dave Duque as Buboi
- Elle Villanueva as Thea
- James Teng as Diego
- Lou Veloso as Z
- Gene Padilla as Buboi's father
- Dang Cruz as Damon

The Lucky One

- Therese Malvar as Wendy
- Elijah Canlas as Dwayne
- Mel Kimura as Emily

Beast Next Door

- Gil Cuerva as Wanggo
- Sophie Albert as Ashley
- Brent Valdez as Jordan
- Yesh Burce as Elisa

The Sacrifice

- Dave Bornea as Nathan
- Anna Vicente as Gabby
- Glenda Garcia as Rebecca
- Raffy Tejada as Anton
- Israel Faustino as Damian
- Kim delas Alas as Terrence
- Marco Marcelo as David
- Jacel Chiu as Josie
- Brando Porbile as Gusting

Sakalam

- Manolo Pedrosa as Tim
- Pauline Mendoza as Sophie
- Faith da Silva as Malihim
- Angela Alarcon as Maganda
- Tina Paner as Beth
- Joshua Bulot as Malakas
- Justine Torralba as Mayumi
- Jericho Rizabal as Masunurin
- Marco Marcelo as Maginhawa
- Almira Cauntungan as Manabat
- Patrick Sison as Makisig

== Accolades ==
Accolades received by My Fantastic Pag-ibig
Year	Award	Category	Recipient	Result	Ref.
2023	35th PMPC Star Awards for Television	Best Horror/Fantasy Program	My Fantastic Pag-ibig	Nominated	
2023	35th PMPC Star Awards for Television	Best New Male TV Personality	Benedict Ramos ("Ghosted")	Nominated	
2023	35th PMPC Star Awards for Television	Best New Male TV Personality	Dave Duque ("Invisiboi")	Nominated	
2023	35th PMPC Star Awards for Television	Best New Male TV Personality	Kaloy Tingcungco ("The Lucky One")	Nominated	
2023	35th PMPC Star Awards for Television	Best New Female TV Personality	Ella Cristofani ("Invisiboi")	Nominated	
2023	35th PMPC Star Awards for Television	Best New Female TV Personality	Elle Villanueva ("Ghosted")	Nominated	
