= StarStruck season 6 =

Season of a Philippine television reality show

StarStruck
- Season 6
- Title card 2015
- No. of episodes: 76

Release
- Original network: GMA Network
- Original release: September 7 – December 19, 2015

Season chronology
- ← Previous; Season 5 Next → Season 7

The sixth season of StarStruck, is a 2015 Philippine television reality talent competition show, was broadcast on GMA Network. Hosted by Dingdong Dantes and Megan Young, it premiered on September 7, 2015. The segment hosts are StarStruck graduates Mark Herras, Miguel Tanfelix, Kris Bernal, and Rocco Nacino, and they serve as journey hosts, who are tasked to join the hopefuls as they go through every phase of the competition. The council was composed of Joey de Leon, Regine Velasquez-Alcasid, Jennylyn Mercado and Dantes is also part of the council. The season ended with 76 episodes on December 19, 2015, having Migo Adecer and Klea Pineda as the Ultimate Survivors.

The series is streaming online on YouTube.

== Overview ==
=== Auditions ===
Key cities for the auditions.

In the last quarter of 2014, GMA Network announced that the distribution of the application form will be on September 6 and 7 and would be distributed nationwide through various malls. For this season, the age limit is set from 15 to 20 years old. There was a live coverage of the said event during Startalk on September 6 and at Sunday All Stars on September 7. The said event was called as The StarStruck Weekend. The first 500 registrants in Metro Manila were accommodated on September 7 for the auditions kick off and was shown the previews in Sunday All Stars. Much of the auditions were held at the GMA Network Center and at SM Supermalls throughout the Philippines.

The following dates and key cities for the auditions are as follows:

Casting Dates (2014)	Key Cities
September 8–12	Metro Manila
September 15–19	Metro Manila
September 22–26	Metro Manila
September 29–30	Metro Manila
October 3	Metro Manila
October 6–11^{1}	Metro Manila
September 13–14	Dagupan and Batangas
September 20–21	Cebu and Bacolod
September 21–22	Naga
September 27–29	Pampanga
October 11–12	Iloilo
October 18–19	Davao

This season was directed by Rico Gutierrez. Like the first two seasons, StarStruck is shown only weekdays having Mondays to Thursdays will be tests and Fridays would be the elimination night. The show held its the Final Judgment on December 19, 2015 at the GMA Network Studio Annex (Studio 7 and Studio 8).

== Selection process ==
In the sixth year of the reality-talent search, Out of numerous who auditioned nationwide, the initial cut of the Top 35 hopefuls were reduced to The Door (the Destinator), after the eliminations of the seven hopefuls the Top 28 hopefuls was created into by the two groups the first group they call the 14 Dreamers and the second group they call the 14 Believers. The Top 28 finalists were reduced to Top 22 finalists, and the last reduced to Top 18 finalists, until they formed the new final fourteen titled, the ultimate final fourteen finalists,

The Ultimate Final 14 underwent various workshops and trainings in order to develop their personalities, talents, and charisma. But, the twist is that every week, one or two from the ultimate final fourteen may have to say goodbye until only four remain. Those who were eliminated were dubbed as StarStruck Avengers.

The Ultimate Final 4 vied for the coveted the Ultimate Survivors titles, the Ultimate Male Survivor and Ultimate Female Survivor, both of them received P1,000,000 pesos each plus and five year an exclusive management contract from GMA Network a house and lot from Camella Homes worth P2,000,000 pesos each.

The First Prince and First Princess, both of them received P250,000 pesos each plus and an exclusive management contract from the network. The StarStruck Avengers (the losing contestants) also received an exclusive contract from the network.

It also featured new team titles in StarStruck History, the Dream 14 and the Believe 14, and the final fourteen coveted to Ultimate Final 14 in the second week.

== Hopefuls ==
=== Bootcamp ===
After the nationwide auditions, the Top 35 hopefuls were selected to advance to the next round of the competition. Their names were revealed during the August 20, 2015 episode of Eat Bulaga!.

In this phase, they faced different stages in order to determine if they will move on and be part of the next round of the competition.

The first stage was the Talent Showcase round wherein they presented to the judges the talents they are most comfortable at. The next stage is the Workshops wherein they were tested and criticized by different coaches. Resident acting coach Gina Alajar once again led the acting workshop for the semi-finalists. Christian Bautista and Prof. Jai Sabas-Aracama sit as the singing mentors, while another resident mentor, Douglas Nierras, trained the semi-finalists in dancing. After workshop stage is the Screen test. The final stage for the semi-final round is the Director's Night wherein the Top 35 hopefuls, semi-finalists faced different well-known directors of the industry to give their opinions and critiques and deliberate who would advance to the next round.

One of the new twists added in this season, is the introduction of The Door. Upon crossing the door, the hopefuls would determine whether or not they will still continue on with their StarStruck Journey. When a contestant touches a hand-shaped portal, s/he will hear one of three things:

- "Congratulations" if she/he makes it to the next round;
- "Thank You" if not; or
- "Result will be announced on the first live broadcast. Until then, good luck!".

As an exciting twist to the show, Dingdong Dantes announced during the first live episode last September 11, 2015 that for the sixth season, instead of having just the traditional Final 14, there will be two sets of fourteen hopefuls who will compete in various challenges. The hopefuls who will standout and survive these challenges will be part of the ultimate final fourteen.

The first twelve finalists whose names were announced during the first four episodes and the two finalists who were announced during the first live episode compose the first group which is dubbed as the Dream 14. The second set of fourteen hopefuls, who were initially expected to be eliminated, composes the group called Believe 14.

When the Ultimate Final 14 were chosen, they are assigned to different challenges every week that will hone their acting, singing, and dancing abilities. Every Friday, one is meant to leave the competition until there were just six others who are left. From ultimate final six, there will be two of them who will be eliminated and after the elimination the two; the ultimate final four will be revealed.

The Ultimate Final 4 will be battling with each other on the Final Judgment. People will choose who they want to win the competition by text voting. 40% of the result will come from the text votes and the remaining 60% is from the council.

Color key:

Male contestant
Female contestant
Semi-finalist
Finalist
Runner-up
Winner

Place	Contestant	Age	Hometown	Exit	Result
1	Migo Adecer	15	Mandaluyong	December 19, 2015	Ultimate Male Survivor
2	Klea Pineda	16	Caloocan	December 19, 2015	Ultimate Female Survivor
3	Elyson De Dios	16	Liloan, Cebu	December 19, 2015	First Prince
4	Ayra Mariano	17	Paombong, Bulacan	December 19, 2015	First Princess
5	Jay Arcilla	19	San Pablo, Laguna	December 11, 2015	Avenger
6	Arra San Agustin	20	Bacoor, Cavite	December 11, 2015	Avenger
7	Liezel Lopez	18	Olongapo, Zambales	November 27, 2015	Avenger
8	Avery Paraiso	21	Antipolo, Rizal	November 27, 2015	Avenger
9	Analyn Barro	19	Bacolod, Negros Occidental	November 20, 2015	Avenger
10	Kevin Sagra	20	South Cotabato	November 13, 2015	Avenger
11	James Teng	17	Marilao, Bulacan	November 6, 2015	Avenger
12	Koreen Medina	20	Santa Rosa, Laguna	October 30, 2015	Avenger
13	Joemarie Nielsen	21	Tarlac, Tarlac	October 23, 2015	Avenger
14	Princess Guevarra	16	Dasmariñas, Cavite	October 16, 2015	Avenger
15	Chat Bornea	20	Talisay, Cebu	October 2, 2015	Top 18
16	Nikki Co	19	Metro Manila	October 2, 2015	Top 18
17	Beatriz Imperial	16	Binangonan, Rizal	October 2, 2015	Top 18
18	Camille Torres	20	Dumaguete, Negros Oriental	October 2, 2015	Top 18
19	Mariam Al-Alawi	18	Metro Manila	September 25, 2015	Top 22
20	Carl Cervantes	18	Antipolo, Rizal	September 25, 2015	Top 22
21	Faith da Silva	15	Calamba, Laguna	September 25, 2015	Top 22
22	Kyle Vergara	18	Las Piñas	September 25, 2015	Top 22
23	Marion Garcia	18	Angeles, Pampanga	September 18, 2015	Top 28
24	April Scott	20	Taguig	September 18, 2015	Top 28
25	Arjan Jimenez	19	Quezon City	September 18, 2015	Top 28
26	Allysa de Real	19	Las Piñas	September 18, 2015	Top 28
27	Claire Vande	16	Cebu City	September 18, 2015	Top 28
28	Prince Clemente	18	Dasmariñas, Cavite	September 18, 2015	Top 28
29	Rachel Dimaculangan	17	Lipa, Batangas	September 10, 2015	Top 35
30	Alicia Lacap	15	Quezon City	September 10, 2015	Top 35
31	Kyle Manalo	20	Quezon City	September 10, 2015	Top 35
32	Karessa Toring	20	Cebu City	September 10, 2015	Top 35
33	Rojean delos Reyes	19	Malolos, Bulacan	September 9, 2015	Top 35
34	Frederick Fructuoso	16	Parañaque	September 8, 2015	Top 35
35	Jefferlyn Serrano	20	Marikina	September 7, 2015	Top 35

== Profiles ==
- Migo Adecer of Sydney, Australia - Migo was born in Lamitan but grew up in Agusan del Sur but where he became part of Hillsong United and Glee Club Australia Agusan del Sur chapter, and who represented of Mandaluyong.
- Klea Pineda of Caloocan - Klea knows how to play ukulele and an adventurous girl. Her hobbies include trekking and surfing.
- Elyson De Dios of Liloan, Cebu - Elyson is an athletic teen who plays football and volleyball. He wants to follow in the footsteps of Paulino Alcantara.
- Ayra Mariano of Paombong, Bulacan - Ayra was born in Northern Marianas. At 7, she started doing commercial stints and became popular recently because of her appearance in a facial cleanser brand commercial, Eskinol. She also played the role of Patricia Sandoval in the webisodes of the miniseries in Wattpad made by the said facial cleanser brand.
- Jay Arcilla of San Pablo, Laguna, He studies in San Pablo, Laguna and into dancing, volleyball and basketball. He joined Eat Bulaga's "That's My Bae" segment in 2015. He's the nephew of Heneral Luna's lead actor, John Arcilla.
- Arra San Agustin of Bacoor, Cavite - but born in Calapan, Oriental Mindoro, Arra is a Psychology major student at De La Salle University in Manila. She is a ballerina who knows figure skating. She was the girlfriend of the DLSU Green Archers Basketball Player, Thomas Torres.
- Liezel Lopez of Olongapo, Zambales - Liezel was a choir member in high school and a former member of a community theater group. For some Critic, Liezel has the potential to become a great actress and expected to be part of Films for international audiences. Unlike other actress, she does her acting not just based on her experience as an actress but also with her own experience in Life. That is why she gains support from some Local Film Enthusiasts who support the Local Film Industry. Despite the challenges that came to her life, she still managed to improve her talent as an actress.
- Avery Paraiso of Antipolo, Rizal - Avery is a half Filipino - half Irish commercial model who has a twin sister. In 2014, Avery also appeared in the film Once a Princess, in which Erich Gonzales plays the lead role. Avery has a featured minor role as a bully. He also appeared in the commercials of RC Cola and Oishi.
- Analyn Barro of Bacolod, Negros Occidental - Analyn is a Marketing Management major student. Despite working as a model, she also dreams of becoming a newscaster someday.
- Kevin Sagra of South Cotabato - Kevin is a martial arts enthusiast. He also knows how to play beatbox, drums and piano.
- James Teng of Marilao, Bulacan - James just graduated high school before joining StarStruck. He already works as a model. His list of hobbies includes volleyball, basketball and chess. He is the nephew of the Basketball Legend Alvin Teng and the cousin of Jeric Teng and Jeron Teng. He is also the boyfriend of the model Janica Nam Floresca.
- Koreen Medina of Santa Rosa, Laguna - Before joining the show, Koreen was first identified as the Mutya ng Pilipinas Asia Pacific International that paved a way for her to be the country's representative at Miss Intercontinental 2013 wherein she finished as third runner-up. She is a Marketing Management student at La Consolacion College-Biñan.
- Joemarie Nielsen of Tarlac, Tarlac - Joemarie is half Filipino - half Thai. His idol in music is Sam Smith. Joemarie also knows how to play guitar and cooks well.
- Princess Guevarra of Dasmariñas, Cavite - Princess is already a commercial model. Aside from being a commercial model, Princess already owns a catering business. She also hopes to be a host of her own show.

== Weekly Artista Tests ==
Color key:

Contestant with the Challenge Winner
Contestant was saved by the Public Vote and Council Vote
Contestant was in the group of Dream 14
Contestant was in the group of Believe 14
Contestant was in the Ultimate Final 14 and Ultimate Final 4
Contestant was in the Bottom Group
Contestant was advanced to the competition and saved by the Council
Contestant was Eliminated
Contestant was the Runner-up
Contestant was the Winner

Week 1: The Door (the Destinator) The Top 35 hopefuls were reduced to the Top 28 hopefuls.

  - Challenge Winner Contestant: Not Awarded
  - Saved Contestant: None

Contestant	Result
Alicia Lacap	Eliminated
Allysa de Real	Safe
Analyn Barro	Safe
April Scott	Safe
Arra San Agustin	Safe
Ayra Mariano	Safe
Beatriz Imperial	Safe
Camille Torres	Safe
Claire Vande	Safe
Faith da Silva	Safe
Jefferlyn Serrano	Eliminated
Karessa Toring	Eliminated
Klea Pineda	Safe
Koreen Medina	Safe
Liezel Lopez	Safe
Mariam Al-Alawi	Safe
Princess Guevarra	Safe
Rachel Dimaculangan	Eliminated
Rojean delos Reyes	Eliminated

Contestant	Result
Arjan Jimenez	Safe
Avery Paraiso	Safe
Carl Cervantes	Safe
Chat Bornea	Safe
Elyson De Dios	Safe
Frederick Fructuoso	Eliminated
James Teng	Safe
Jay Arcilla	Safe
Joemarie Nielsen	Safe
Kevin Sagra	Safe
Kyle Manalo	Eliminated
Kyle Vergara	Safe
Marion Garcia	Safe
Migo Adecer	Safe
Nikki Co	Safe
Prince Clemente	Safe

Week 2: This season twists was announced by the host Dingdong Dantes for the two groups, team 14 Dreamers versus team 14 Believers hopefuls for the acting test.

  - Challenge Winner Contestant: Not Awarded
  - Saved Contestant: None
  - Eliminated Contestant: None

Contestant	Result
Allysa de Real	Believe 14
Analyn Barro	Dream 14
April Scott	Dream 14
Arra San Agustin	Believe 14
Ayra Mariano	Dream 14
Beatriz Imperial	Believe 14
Camille Torres	Believe 14
Claire Vande	Believe 14
Faith da Silva	Believe 14
Klea Pineda	Dream 14
Koreen Medina	Dream 14
Liezel Lopez	Dream 14
Mariam Al-Alawi	Dream 14
Princess Guevarra	Believe 14

Contestant	Result
Arjan Jimenez	Believe 14
Avery Paraiso	Dream 14
Carl Cervantes	Dream 14
Chat Bornea	Believe 14
Elyson De Dios	Dream 14
James Teng	Believe 14
Jay Arcilla	Believe 14
Joemarie Nielsen	Dream 14
Kevin Sagra	Dream 14
Kyle Vergara	Dream 14
Marion Garcia	Dream 14
Migo Adecer	Believe 14
Nikki Co	Believe 14
Prince Clemente	Believe 14

Week 3: The Top 28 hopefuls, were reduced to the Top 22 hopefuls.

  - Saved Contestant: None

Contestant	Result
Allysa de Real	Eliminated
Analyn Barro	Safe
April Scott	Eliminated
Arra San Agustin	Safe
Ayra Mariano	Safe
Beatriz Imperial	Safe
Camille Torres	Safe
Claire Vande	Eliminated
Faith da Silva	Challenge Winner
Klea Pineda	Challenge Winner
Koreen Medina	Safe
Liezel Lopez	Safe
Mariam Al-Alawi	Safe
Princess Guevarra	Safe

Contestant	Result
Arjan Jimenez	Eliminated
Avery Paraiso	Safe
Carl Cervantes	Safe
Chat Bornea	Safe
Elyson De Dios	Safe
James Teng	Safe
Jay Arcilla	Safe
Joemarie Nielsen	Challenge Winner
Kevin Sagra	Safe
Kyle Vergara	Safe
Marion Garcia	Eliminated
Migo Adecer	Challenge Winner
Nikki Co	Safe
Prince Clemente	Eliminated

Week 4: The Top 22 hopefuls, were reduced to the Top 18 hopefuls.

  - Challenge Winner Contestant: Not Awarded
  - Saved Contestant: None

Contestant	Result
Analyn Barro	Safe
Arra San Agustin	Safe
Ayra Mariano	Safe
Beatriz Imperial	Bottom 8
Camille Torres	Safe
Faith da Silva	Eliminated
Klea Pineda	Safe
Koreen Medina	Bottom 8
Liezel Lopez	Safe
Mariam Al-Alawi	Eliminated
Princess Guevarra	Safe

Contestant	Result
Avery Paraiso	Safe
Carl Cervantes	Eliminated
Chat Bornea	Bottom 8
Elyson De Dios	Bottom 8
James Teng	Safe
Jay Arcilla	Safe
Joemarie Nielsen	Safe
Kevin Sagra	Safe
Kyle Vergara	Eliminated
Migo Adecer	Safe
Nikki Co	Safe

Week 5: The Top 18 hopefuls, and they formed the Ultimate Final 14 hopefuls.

  - Challenge Winner Contestant: Not Awarded

Contestant	Result
Analyn Barro	Ultimate Final 14
Arra San Agustin	Ultimate Final 14
Ayra Mariano	Fast-Tracked
Beatriz Imperial	Eliminated
Camille Torres	Eliminated
Klea Pineda	Fast-Tracked
Koreen Medina	Ultimate Final 14
Liezel Lopez	Ultimate Final 14
Princess Guevarra	Ultimate Final 14

Contestant	Result
Avery Paraiso	Fast-Tracked
Chat Bornea	Eliminated
Elyson De Dios	Ultimate Final 14
James Teng	Ultimate Final 14
Jay Arcilla	Ultimate Final 14
Joemarie Nielsen	Ultimate Final 14
Kevin Sagra	Ultimate Final 14
Migo Adecer	Fast-Tracked
Nikki Co	Eliminated

Week 6: Kilig Serye

Guest directors, Mark A. Reyes and Louie Ignacio challenges The Final 14, grouped by couples (one boy and one girl), to act in a short romance-drama with guest comedians and actors from Bubble Gang. The assigned couples are also challenged to perform in a romantic music video.

  - Saved Contestant: None
  - Eliminated Contestant: None (The scores for Week 1 tests including the councils' scores and public votes will be carried over for Week 2 results.)

Contestant	Result
Analyn Barro	Safe
Arra San Agustin	Safe
Ayra Mariano	Challenge Winner
Klea Pineda	Safe
Koreen Medina	Challenge Winner
Liezel Lopez^{2}	Bottom 4
Princess Guevarra	Bottom 4

Contestant	Result
Avery Paraiso	Challenge Winner
Elyson De Dios	Challenge Winner
James Teng	Safe
Jay Arcilla	Bottom 4
Joemarie Nielsen	Bottom 4
Kevin Sagra	Safe
Migo Adecer	Safe

Week 7: Sampal Serye and Direct Action

Director Mark Dela Cruz and veteran actress, Jaclyn Jose of MariMar, were tasked to test the versatility of the StarStruck survivors in a dramatic short film. The assigned couples had the same script and scenario but all with a different ending. In the end, Dela Cruz chose Liezel Lopez and Joemarie Nielsen as his Best Performers, while he named Analyn Barro and Migo Adecer as the Best Pair. Jaclyn Jose, on the other hand chose Migo Adecer and Liezel Lopez as her Best Performers, while Arra San Agustin and Jay Arcilla got the praises of the veteran actress, and named them as the Best Pair as well. Jaclyn Jose is amazed at those men's bodies especially Jay Arcilla's Topless body. Veteran director, Joel Lamangan tested their acting skills. The finalists were first asked to introduce themselves in a creative manner and was then instructed to act according to his direct action. In the end, at the show's elimination night, it was revealed that Liezel Lopez was jointly chosen by the council, acting mentors and directors as the best performing survivor for this week.

  - Saved Contestant: None

Contestant	Result
Analyn Barro	Safe
Arra San Agustin	Safe
Ayra Mariano	Safe
Klea Pineda	Bottom 4
Koreen Medina	Safe
Liezel Lopez	Challenge Winner
Princess Guevarra^{3}	Eliminated

Contestant	Result
Avery Paraiso	Safe
Elyson De Dios	Safe
James Teng	Bottom 4
Jay Arcilla	Safe
Joemarie Nielsen	Bottom 4
Kevin Sagra	Safe
Migo Adecer	Safe

Week 8: Survivors and Graduates' Face-Off

For this week's challenge, the remaining survivors will face another acting test with StarStruck graduates from past seasons. Directed by film and television director, Neal Del Rosario. The first group was composed of Liezel Lopez, Arra San Agustin, and Jay Arcilla with LJ Reyes, Katrina Halili, and Mike Tan. Their group was assigned to do a short provocative drama play. The second group was composed of Ayra Mariano, Kevin Sagra, and Migo Adecer with Ryza Cenon, Kevin Santos, and Diva Montelaba. Their group was assigned to do a short comedy play. The next group which composed of Klea Pineda, Avery Paraiso, Analyn Barro, and Joemarie Nielsen with Nadine Samonte and Jade Lopez were assigned to do a short heavy-family drama play. And the last group composed of Elyson De Dios, James Teng, and Koreen Medina with Enzo Pineda, Jackie Rice, and Jade Lopez for the second time were assigned to do a short comedy-horror play. At the end of each episodes, it was announced that the guest director and former StarStruck graduates will have a special power to automatically make one survivor part of this week's bottom group. As a result, they chose Jay Arcilla, Kevin Sagra, Joemarie Nielsen, and Elyson De Dios. However, Kevin Sagra was automatically saved in the results show and it went to James Teng instead.

  - Challenge Winner Contestant: Not Awarded
  - Saved Contestant: None

Contestant	Result
Analyn Barro	Safe
Arra San Agustin	Safe
Ayra Mariano	Safe
Klea Pineda	Safe
Koreen Medina	Safe
Liezel Lopez	Safe

Contestant	Result
Avery Paraiso	Safe
Elyson De Dios^{4}	Bottom 4
James Teng	Bottom 4
Jay Arcilla	Bottom 4
Joemarie Nielsen	Eliminated
Kevin Sagra	Safe
Migo Adecer	Safe

Week 9: Immersion Test

The finalists were tasked to know the responsibilities and difficulties as an actor or actress by assigning them to appear as minor roles in GMA-7's television shows. The first three finalists to perform are Migo, Klea, and Avery. Migo Adecer and Klea Pineda were tasked to guest in the top-rating afternoon soap, The Half Sisters while Avery Paraiso was tasked to guest in Bubble Gang. The next three were Ayra, Kevin, and Jay. Ayra Mariano was assigned to guest in the sitcom, Pepito Manaloto. Like Ayra, Kevin Sagra was also assigned in a sitcom. But unlike her, Sagra guest in Ismol Family. Jay Arcilla had a special appearance in the afternoon soap, Buena Familia where he played the role of Marco, Edwin's friend. In day three, Liezel Lopez and James Teng guest in Destiny Rose as they were both assigned in the said show. Elyson De Dios also guest in Pepito Manaloto like his partner, Ayra Mariano but not the same set. In its Thursday episode (a day before the live eliminations), Arra San Agustin had a special appearance in a primetime series which is My Faithful Husband where she played the role of Ana. Analyn Barro and Koreen Medina guest as hosts in iBilib with Chris Tiu, Moymoy Palaboy, and Solenn Heussaff. They were also challenged by their fellow finalists through a new segment, StarStruck Time Out. In "Isang Tanong, Isang Tanong", One of the 14 finalists were free to ask different questions from their companions. In "Hugot", One of the finalists were free to say what they want to say with their fellow finalists. In "Push Mo 'to ah!", The survivors should do something they hate to overcome their fears. And last, The "May alam ako sa 'yo", They should let their close friend reveal something about them the audience didn't know.

  - Challenge Winner Contestant: Not Awarded
  - Saved Contestant: None

Contestant	Result
Analyn Barro	Safe
Arra San Agustin	Safe
Ayra Mariano	Safe
Klea Pineda	Safe
Koreen Medina	Eliminated
Liezel Lopez^{5}	Bottom 4

Contestant	Result
Avery Paraiso	Safe
Elyson De Dios	Safe
James Teng	Bottom 4
Jay Arcilla	Bottom 4
Kevin Sagra	Safe
Migo Adecer	Safe

Week 10: Kilabot Serye

Guest Director, Maryo J. de los Reyes challenges The Last 11 finalists to act in a short horror play. In its Thursday episode (a day before the elimination night), Vaness del Moral had a guest appearance as Joyce, The antagonist for the last two finalists. In this week, they also introduce another StarStruck Time Out segment, "Lagot". In this new segment, each finalist would search for a negative or positive comment of the watchers and read it with their reactions.

  - Challenge Winner Contestant: Not Awarded
  - Saved Contestant: None

Contestant	Result
Analyn Barro	Safe
Arra San Agustin	Safe
Ayra Mariano	Safe
Klea Pineda	Bottom 4
Liezel Lopez^{6}	Bottom 4

Contestant	Result
Avery Paraiso	Safe
Elyson De Dios	Safe
James Teng	Eliminated
Jay Arcilla	Safe
Kevin Sagra	Bottom 4
Migo Adecer	Safe

Week 11: Kiss flicks

Guest Director, Gina Alajar challenges the top 10 finalists to perform a short play of a kissing scene with StarStruck Ultimate Survivor Aljur Abrenica for the girls and Kylie Padilla for the boys. The next one, also directed by Gina Alajar was "Kiss flicks presents: True Love Stories". Kapuso online send their true love stories through StarStruck's official Twitter, Instagram, and Facebook pages. The contestants were tasked to perform it with Tita Emotera as the host. Those stories include "Love Radar" (with AySon), "Mr. And Ms. Doughnut" (with KevLyn), "Mr. Yoso" (with MigLea), "Cutie P.I" (with JayRa), and "The Kiss Bet" (with AveZel). They also introduce here a new set of Loveteams, KevLyn (Kevin Sagra and Analyn Barro), MigLea (Migo Adecer and Klea Pineda), and AveZel (Avery Paraiso and Liezel Lopez).

  - Challenge Winner Contestant: Not Awarded

Contestant	Result
Analyn Barro	Safe
Arra San Agustin	Safe
Ayra Mariano	Saved
Klea Pineda	Safe
Liezel Lopez^{7}	Bottom 5

Contestant	Result
Avery Paraiso	Safe
Elyson De Dios	Safe
Jay Arcilla	Bottom 5
Kevin Sagra^{8}	Eliminated
Migo Adecer^{7}	Bottom 5

Week 12: Comedy Challenge

The nine finalists were challenged to perform a comedy short film with guest actors and comedians Manilyn Reynes and Pekto. They are grouped in groups of 3. Elyson De Dios, Arra San Agustin, and Liezel Lopez on the first day, Migo Adecer, Klea Pineda, and Jay Arcilla on the second, and Ayra Mariano, Avery Paraiso, and Analyn Barro on the third. On Thursday, they were also challenged to perform a short skit in Bubble Gang mentored by Michael V. and director Uro dela Cruz. After the performance, Uro dela Cruz chose Liezel Lopez, Klea Pineda, and Ayra Mariano as his choice of winners.

  - Challenge Winner Contestant: Not awarded
  - Saved Contestant: None

Contestant	Result
Analyn Barro	Eliminated
Arra San Agustin	Safe
Ayra Mariano	Bottom 4
Klea Pineda	Safe
Liezel Lopez	Safe

Contestant	Result
Avery Paraiso	Bottom 4
Elyson De Dios^{9}	Bottom 4
Jay Arcilla	Safe
Migo Adecer	Safe

Week 13: Market and Dumpsite Immersion

The remaining 8 survivors were tasked to have an immersion inside the market and the dumpsite. Arra San Agustin, Jay Arcilla, Ayra Mariano, and Elyson De Dios act in the market with the title, "Taguan ng Feelings" with Veteran actress, Jean Garcia. The second group consists of Klea Pineda, Migo Adecer, Liezel Lopez, and Avery Paraiso act in the dump site titled, "Scavengers" with actor Gabby Eigenmann. In this week's StarStruck Time Out, Coach Cynthia (played by Wally Bayola) from Sunday PinaSaya had a guest appearance. Coach Cynthia taught the finalists about her over acting skills.

  - Challenge Winner Contestant: Not Awarded
  - Saved Contestant: None

Contestant	Result
Arra San Agustin	Safe
Ayra Mariano	Bottom 4
Klea Pineda	Safe
Liezel Lopez	Eliminated

Contestant	Result
Avery Paraiso	Eliminated
Elyson De Dios	Safe
Jay Arcilla	Safe
Migo Adecer	Bottom 4

Week 14: The Avengers Strikes Back

Guest Director Real Florido, were assigned to Direct The Final 6 survivors composed of Migo Adecer, Jay Arcilla, Elyson De Dios, Ayra Mariano, Klea Pineda, and Arra San Agustin were assigned to work with the StarStruck avengers in a drama-romantic-comedy anthology where the viewers are free to choose what ending they want to be played via Twitter and Facebook. This serves as the fourteen hopefuls' longest series wherein they are all complete. The loveteam AySon star in "Love Begins", MigLea in "Love Ends", and JayRa in "Love Again" with veteran actress, Snooky Serna. In this point, the avengers come back to vote their Ultimate Final 4 via The Destinator. Each survivors got 4 points, but according to the host, it was just an opinion by the avengers who cannot affect their votes. It was also revealed this week that the avengers will not return in the competition as wildcards.

  - Challenge Winner Contestant: Not Awarded
  - Eliminated Contestant: None (The scores for Week 9 tests including the councils' scores and public votes will be carried over for Week 10 results.)

Contestant	Result
Arra San Agustin	Safe
Ayra Mariano	Safe
Klea Pineda	Safe

Contestant	Result
Elyson De Dios	Safe
Jay Arcilla	Safe
Migo Adecer	Safe

Week 15: Family Drama

Guest Director, Bb. Joyce Bernal challenges the remaining survivors with the theme, Family drama. This mini series is entitled "TAHANAN" which stars the final 6 with the two veteran actors, Glydel Mercado and Christopher de Leon as their parents. In this week, the final 6 come back to The Door by which it will determine to whom the final 4 title will be given. The mechanics in this stage is the same as what the top 35 experienced.

Contestant	Result
Arra San Agustin	Eliminated
Ayra Mariano	Ultimate Final 4
Klea Pineda	Ultimate Final 4

Contestant	Result
Elyson De Dios	Ultimate Final 4
Jay Arcilla	Eliminated
Migo Adecer	Ultimate Final 4

Week 16: The Final Judgment

In this week, there will be StarStruck Saturday, And it was revealed that the Saturday episode would be The Final Judgment. In its Weekday episodes, the Ultimate Final 4 survivors would have a homecoming. And after that, the council will ask some of the hardest questions to them. An "Ultimate Male Survivor" and "Ultimate Female Survivor" each of them will received P1,000,000 pesos each plus and five year an exclusive management contract from GMA Network a house and lot from Camella Homes worth P2,000,000 pesos each. And will join the cast of the upcoming telefantasya, Encantadia. (Note: As seen on this show, aired on October 15, 2015.) While "First Prince" and "First Princess" received P200,000 pesos.

Contestant	Result
Ayra Mariano	First Princess
Klea Pineda	Ultimate Female Survivor

Contestant	Result
Elyson De Dios	First Prince
Migo Adecer	Ultimate Male Survivor

=== Notes ===
1. Liezel Lopez was automatically included in the bottom group for having the majority of the votes (to eliminate) from her co-StarStruck finalists via The Destinator.
2. Princess Guevarra was automatically included in the bottom group for having the majority of the votes (to eliminate) from her co-StarStruck finalists via The Destinator.
3. Jay Arcilla, Kevin Sagra, Joemarie Nielsen, and Elyson De Dios were jointly chosen by the guest director and StarStruck graduates to be automatically part of this week's bottom group. However, Sagra was automatically saved in the results show and it went to James Teng instead. Additionally, De Dios garnered the majority of the votes (to eliminate) from her co-StarStruck finalists via The Destinator.
4. Liezel Lopez and Arra San Agustin have the most votes (to eliminate) from their co-StarStruck finalists via The Destinator. But in the results show, only Lopez was included in the bottom group.
5. Liezel Lopez was automatically included in the bottom group for having the majority of the votes (to eliminate) from her co-StarStruck finalists via The Destinator.
6. Liezel Lopez and Migo Adecer have the most votes (to eliminate) from their co-StarStruck finalists via The Destinator.
7. Kevin Sagra was automatically eliminated after the StarStruck council chose to save Ayra Mariano.
8. Elyson De Dios and Arra San Agustin have the most votes (to eliminate) from their co-StarStruck finalists via The Destinator but when the last vote is on Liezel Lopez, she gave it to Elyson De Dios.

== Final Judgment ==
The winner was announced on a two-hour TV special dubbed as StarStruck: The Final Judgment was held live on December 19, 2015 at the GMA Network Studio Annex (Studio 7 and Studio 8) on the same event.

Hosted by Dingdong Dantes, But Megan Young, she was not attending as a co-host, because she serves as a presenter co-host from Miss World 2015 pageant on the same date. The segment co-hosted are graduates with Mark Herras, Miguel Tanfelix, Kris Bernal and Rocco Nacino. The council was formed with Regine Velasquez and Jennylyn Mercado while Maryo J. de los Reyes took over the place of Joey de Leon in this event.

An opening dance number consist of graduates including Mark Herras, Jennylyn Mercado, Yasmien Kurdi, Mike Tan, Ryza Cenon, LJ Reyes, Aljur Abrenica, Kris Bernal, Steven Silva, Enzo Pineda, Diva Montelaba, Rocco Nacino and Sef Cadayona from previous seasons. The junior graduates, Miguel Tanfelix, Ella Guevara and Sandy Talag perform a dance number. They were joined by the ultimate final fourteen and the avengers’ performances were next to performing re-enacting their elimination week by week by singing and dancing.

The avenger, Analyn Barro received P100,000 pesos awarded by Palmolive after earning the highest number of votes from the viewers.

The ultimate final four then perform their solo performances. Ayra Mariano sang Katy Perry’s Part of Me, Klea Pineda sang Ariana Grande’s Break Free, Elyson De Dios performs a dance number and Migo Adecer sang and dances by Jason Derulo’s Want to Want Me.

The special guest, Alden Richards sang Bryan White’s God Gave Me You, followed by a dance number with the avengers. Before the final results, the council members and Regine Velasquez-Alcasid sang Miley Cyrus’s The Climb.

Elyson De Dios and Ayra Mariano received P250,000 pesos each awarded by brand Manager of Lewis & Pearl, Ms. Valerie Tan as the sensational couple of this said product.

Klea Pineda of Caloocan is the Ultimate Female Survivor and Migo Adecer of Mandaluyong is the Ultimate Male Survivor were proclaimed as the Ultimate Survivors, each of them will receive P1,000,000 pesos each plus and a five-year exclusive management contract from GMA Network a house and lot from Camella Homes worth P2,000,000 pesos each. And will join the cast of the upcoming telefantasya, Encantadia.

While, Ayra Mariano of Paombong, Bulacan is the First Princess and Elyson De Dios of Liloan, Cebu is the First Prince were proclaimed as the Runners-up, each of them received P200,000 pesos, each plus and an exclusive management contract from the network. The StarStruck Avengers (the losing contestants) also received an exclusive contract from the network.

== TV Assignment ==
For their first TV Assignment, the ultimate survivors Migo Adecer and Klea Pineda with the avengers Arra San Agustin, Avery Paraiso and James Teng were join the upcoming cast of the telefantasya, Encantadia.

== Signature dances ==
There are signature dances and songs made in each batch. With this batch, their signature dances and songs are:

- Dessert
- Don’t Be Pabebe
- Fantastic Baby

== Elimination chart ==
Color key:

Male contestant
Female contestant
Semi-finalist
Dream 14
Believe 14
Ultimate Final 14 and Ultimate Final 4
Challenge winner
Safe
Bottom group
Eliminated
Fast-tracked and Judges saved
Finalist
Runner-up
Winner

Results per public and council votes
Place	Contestant	Top 35 (Week 1)	Top 28 (Week 2-3)		Top 22 (Week 4)	Top 18 (Week 5)	Top 14 (Week 6-7)		Top 13 (Week 8)	Top 12 (Week 9)	Top 11 (Week 10)	Top 10 (Week 11)	Top 9 (Week 12)	Top 8 (Week 13)	Top 6 (Week 14-15)		Top 4 (Week 16)
Place	Contestant	9/7-10/15^{1}	9/11/15^{2}	9/18/15^{3}	9/25/15^{4}	10/2/15^{5}	10/9/15^{6}	10/16/15	10/23/15	10/30/15	11/6/15	11/13/15^{7}	11/20/15	11/27/15	12/4/15^{8}	12/11/15^{9}	12/19/15^{10}
1–4	Migo Adecer	Top 28	Believe 14	Challenge Winner	Safe	Fast-Tracked	Safe	Safe	Safe	Safe	Safe	Bottom 5	Safe	Bottom 4	Safe	Ultimate Final 4	Ultimate Male Survivor
1–4	Klea Pineda	Top 28	Dream 14	Challenge Winner	Safe	Fast-Tracked	Safe	Bottom 4	Safe	Safe	Bottom 4	Safe	Safe	Safe	Safe	Ultimate Final 4	Ultimate Female Survivor
1–4	Elyson De Dios	Top 28	Dream 14	Safe	Bottom 8	Ultimate Final 14	Challenge Winner	Safe	Bottom 4	Safe	Safe	Safe	Bottom 4	Safe	Safe	Ultimate Final 4	First Prince
1–4	Ayra Mariano	Top 28	Dream 14	Safe	Safe	Fast-Tracked	Challenge Winner	Safe	Safe	Safe	Safe	Judges Saved	Bottom 2	Bottom 4	Safe	Ultimate Final 4	First Princess
5–6	Jay Arcilla	Top 28	Believe 14	Safe	Safe	Ultimate Final 14	Bottom 4	Safe	Bottom 2	Bottom 4	Safe	Bottom 5	Safe	Safe	Safe	Eliminated	Avenger
5–6	Arra San Agustin	Top 28	Believe 14	Safe	Safe	Ultimate Final 14	Safe	Safe	Safe	Safe	Safe	Safe	Safe	Safe	Safe	Eliminated	Avenger
7–8	Liezel Lopez	Top 28	Dream 14	Safe	Safe	Ultimate Final 14	Bottom 4	Challenge Winner	Safe	Bottom 4	Bottom 4	Bottom 5	Safe	Eliminated			Avenger
7–8	Avery Paraiso	Top 28	Dream 14	Safe	Safe	Fast-Tracked	Challenge Winner	Safe	Safe	Safe	Safe	Safe	Bottom 4	Eliminated			Avenger
9	Analyn Barro	Top 28	Dream 14	Safe	Safe	Ultimate Final 14	Safe	Safe	Safe	Safe	Safe	Safe	Eliminated				Avenger
10	Kevin Sagra	Top 28	Dream 14	Safe	Safe	Ultimate Final 14	Safe	Safe	Safe	Safe	Bottom 2	Eliminated					Avenger
11	James Teng	Top 28	Believe 14	Safe	Safe	Ultimate Final 14	Safe	Bottom 2	Bottom 4	Bottom 2	Eliminated						Avenger
12	Koreen Medina	Top 28	Dream 14	Safe	Bottom 8	Ultimate Final 14	Challenge Winner	Safe	Safe	Eliminated							Avenger
13	Joemarie Nielsen	Top 28	Dream 14	Challenge Winner	Safe	Ultimate Final 14	Bottom 2	Bottom 4	Eliminated								Avenger
14	Princess Guevarra	Top 28	Believe 14	Safe	Safe	Ultimate Final 14	Bottom 2	Eliminated									Avenger
15–18	Chat Bornea	Top 28	Believe 14	Safe	Bottom 8	Eliminated											Top 18
15–18	Nikki Co	Top 28	Believe 14	Safe	Safe	Eliminated											Top 18
15–18	Beatriz Imperial	Top 28	Believe 14	Safe	Bottom 8	Eliminated											Top 18
15–18	Camille Torres	Top 28	Believe 14	Safe	Safe	Eliminated											Top 18
19–22	Mariam Al-Alawi	Top 28	Dream 14	Safe	Eliminated												Top 22
19–22	Carl Cervantes	Top 28	Dream 14	Safe	Eliminated												Top 22
19–22	Faith da Silva	Top 28	Believe 14	Challenge Winner	Eliminated												Top 22
19–22	Kyle Vergara	Top 28	Dream 14	Safe	Eliminated												Top 22
23–28	Marion Garcia	Top 28	Dream 14	Eliminated													Top 28
23–28	April Scott	Top 28	Dream 14	Eliminated													Top 28
23–28	Arjan Jimenez	Top 28	Believe 14	Eliminated													Top 28
23–28	Allysa de Real	Top 28	Believe 14	Eliminated													Top 28
23–28	Claire Vande	Top 28	Believe 14	Eliminated													Top 28
23–28	Prince Clemente	Top 28	Believe 14	Eliminated													Top 28
29–32	Rachel Dimaculangan	Eliminated															Top 35
29–32	Alicia Lacap	Eliminated															Top 35
29–32	Kyle Manalo	Eliminated															Top 35
29–32	Karessa Toring	Eliminated															Top 35
33	Rojean delos Reyes	Eliminated															Top 35
34	Frederick Fructuoso	Eliminated															Top 35
35	Jefferlyn Serrano	Eliminated															Top 35

=== Notes ===
1. The seven survivors were eliminated from the first week on the Destinator. They are Jefferlyn Serrano, Frederick Fructuoso, Rojean delos Reyes, Rachel Dimaculangan, Alicia Lacap, Kyle Manalo and Karessa Toring.
2. The first twelve finalists whose names were announced during the first four episodes and the two finalists who were announced during the first live episode compose the first group which is dubbed as the Dream 14. The second set of fourteen hopefuls, who were initially expected to be eliminated, composes the group called Believe 14.
3. Migo Adecer on the award for best in singing; Klea Pineda for best in acting in girls category; Joemarie Nielsen for best in acting in boys category; Faith da Silva got the award for best in dancing. These winner were chosen by the mentor from the survivors set of challenges. The six survivors were eliminated from the second week. They are Prince Clemente, Claire Vande, Allysa de Real, Arjan Jimenez, April Scott, and Marion Garcia.
4. The four survivors were eliminated from the third week. They are Mariam Al-Alawi, Carl Cervantes, Faith da Silva and Kyle Vergara.
5. One of the council's powers is to choose a contestant to advance directly to the Ultimate Final 14. The council chose four contestants each to be in their consideration. Dingdong Dantes chose Klea Pineda; Jennylyn Mercado chose Avery Paraiso; Joey de Leon chose Ayra Mariano; Regine Velasquez-Alcasid chose Migo Adecer. The four survivors were eliminated from the fourth week to complete the Ultimate Final 14. They are Chat Bornea, Nikki Co, Beatriz Imperial, and Camille Torres.
6. It was a non-elimination week. The bottom group are Jay Arcilla, Liezel Lopez, Joemarie Nielsen, and Princess Guevarra was safe for the elimination on October 9, 2015.
7. The council's powers are to choose a contestant to save from the elimination. The last bottom group are Kevin Sagra and Ayra Mariano. Kevin Sagra was automatically eliminated after the StarStruck council choose to save Ayra Mariano.
8. It was a non-elimination week. No bottom group was announced, however, Jay Arcilla and Arra San Agustin were the last to be called safe. Scores for this week will be carried over until next week.
9. The Ultimate Final 4 was chosen on December 11, 2015. And the last avengers are Arra San Agustin and Jay Arcilla. The first called to eliminated is Arra San Agustin and the second called is Jay Arcilla.
10. In the final judgment night, Migo Adecer and Klea Pineda were proclaimed as the Ultimate Survivors.
