= Jay Arcilla =

Filipino actor and internet celebrity

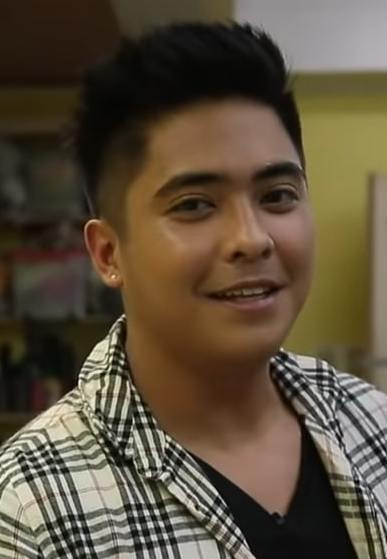
- Arcilla in 2019
- Born: Ruel Julian Peter Arcilla; May 21, 1996 (age 30); San Pablo, Laguna, Philippines
- Other names: Jay, Jayjay, Mister Jayjay
- Occupations: YouTube sensation; Actor; model; dancer
- Years active: 2013–present
- Agent: Sparkle GMA Artist Center (2013–present)
- Known for: That's My Bae; StarStruck; Member of One Up
- Height: 1.73 m (5 ft 8 in)

Ruel Julian Peter Arcilla (born May 21, 1996), simply known as Jay Arcilla, is a YouTube sensation, actor, model and dancer. He is best known for his viral Dubsmash video Twerk It Like Miley by Brandon Beal, and bagged his role as Reggie in the Primetime series broadcast by GMA Network, Little Nanay.

== Biography ==
In 2015, he joined Eat Bulaga!'s segment, That's My Bae: "Twerk It" Dance Contest. The same year, he also joined the comeback StarStruck with its 6th season.

He is the nephew of the lead actor of Heneral Luna, John Arcilla.

== Career ==
=== That's My Bae ===
In 2015, he auditioned in an Eat Bulaga! segment, That's My Bae: "Twerk It" Dance Contest. He is one of the first Baes to enter the Eat Bulaga! stage together with Miggy Tolentino and Tommy Peñaflor. Arcilla did not pass through the Semi-finals because of joining the reality show slated to air in an early September day, StarStruck.

=== StarStruck ===
He also auditioned in the comeback of the hit reality show, StarStruck on its 6th season. He has finished his journey as the last contestant eliminated together with Arra San Agustin.

== Filmography ==
=== Television ===
Year	Title	Role
2013	Maynila: Kasunduan ng Puso	Roland
2014	Maynila: Y.O.L.O. (You Only Love Once)	Damien
2014	Maynila: Number One Fan	Makoy
2015	Eat Bulaga!	That's My Bae (Jayjay) / Himself
2015	StarStruck VI	Himself / Contestant / First Avenger
2016	Buena Familia	Marco (StarStruck VI: Immersion Role)
2016	Little Nanay	Reggie Cubrador
2016	Dear Uge: No Way, I'm Gay?!	Miguel
2016	Naku, Boss Ko!	Emil
2016	Magpakailanman: Gang War Victim	Jay
2016	Magpakailanman: Kadugo, Kaaway, Kakampi	Kokoy
2016	Alyas Robin Hood	Louie Mayuga
2016	Wagas	Rommel
2016	Karelasyon: Yaya	James
2016	Dear Uge: May–December Love Affairs	Julio
2016	Usapang Real Love: Perfect Fit	Kristoff
2017	Meant to Be	Albert
2017	Taste Buddies	Himself / Guest
2017-2018	Celebrity Bluff	Himself / Performer
2017	Dear Uge	Pocholo
2017	Impostora	Nurse Alvin
2017	Magpakailanman: Nika Manika	Neil
2018	Contessa	Jonas Zamora
2018	Wagas: Mahal Ko, Kakambal ng Engkanto	Joseph
2018	Magpakailanman: Palimos ng Pag-ibig	Erwin
2019	Magpakailanman: Yanig ng Buhay - The Pampanga Earthquake Victims Story	Adan Hernandez
2019	The Better Woman	Michael San Luis
2019	Magpakailanman: The Girl in the Sex Video Scandal	Carlo Tolentino
2020	Magpakailanman: Tanging Ina ng Lahat	Ronaldo
2020	Anak ni Waray vs. Anak ni Biday	Luis
2020	Imbestigador: Pares Vendor Murder Case	Alexander Ogdamina
2021	Legal Wives	Vince Alvarez
2022	Wish Ko Lang: Battered Wife	Omar
2022	Magpakailanman: Ampon Man sa Iyong Paningin	Onin
2022	Imbestigador: Cebu Robbery and Frustrated Murder Case	Alexander Rematado
2022	Magpakailanman: Ang Driver na Mr. Pogi	Shawn
2022	Start-Up PH	Angelo Joseph "Anjo" Perez
2022	Imbestigador: Calbayog City Double Murder Case	Harold
2023	Mga Lihim ni Urduja	Garcia
2023	Magpakailanman: Inang Walang Pamilya	Harry
2023	Magpakailanman: A Song for Daddy	Andy Antonio
2023	Black Rider	Hilario
2024	Makiling	Ventanilla
2024	Magpakailanman: The Blind Pianist	Ricky "Ric" Manicad
2024	Pulang Araw	Dado
2026	House of Lies	Young Greg
