= Faith da Silva =

Filipina actress, singer, model and host (born 2001)

- Born: Faith Daryl da Silva; April 29, 2001 (age 25); Quezon City, Philippines
- Occupations: Actress; singer; model; host
- Years active: 2015–present
- Agent: Sparkle (2015–present)
- Height: 167 cm (5 ft 6 in)
- Musical career
- Years active: 2022–present
- Label: GMA Music

Faith Daryl da Silva (born April 29, 2001) is a Filipino actress, singer, model and host. She stars as Sang'gre Flamarra in the drama fantasy series Encantadia Chronicles: Sang'gre (2025).

== Career ==
She started her television appearances in the anthology series Magpakailanman before participating in the sixth season of the reality show StarStruck. In 2016, she played Carol del Mundo in the romantic drama Once Again. In 2017, she played Natasha Andrada in the fantasy romance My Love from the Star and Maila in the drama horror Kambal, Karibal. In 2018, she played Chee in the romantic comedy The One That Got Away and Denise in the drama crime Ika-5 Utos. In 2019, she played Fareeda Buenavista in the drama fantasy Sahaya. In 2020, she played Agatha Escoto in the drama Anak ni Waray vs. Anak ni Biday. In 2021, she played Scarlet Manansala in the drama Las Hermanas. In 2022, she played Carnation Marasigan in the sci-fi drama Unica Hija. In 2023, she played Khatun Khublun in the drama fantasy Mga Lihim ni Urduja and Bettina "Betty" Ramirez in the drama action romance Maging Sino Ka Man. In 2025, she starred as Sang’gre Flamarra in the drama fantasy Encantadia Chronicles: Sang’gre.

=== Music career ===
da Silva is also a singer under GMA Music. In 2022, she released the single "Sana Sabihin Mo Na Lang".

== Personal life ==
She is the daughter of Annabelle C. and former actor Dennis da Silva.

== Filmography ==
=== Television ===
Year	Title	Role	Note(s)
2013–2022	Magpakailanman	Various	Episode roles
2015	StarStruck	Herself	Contestant
2016	Once Again	Carol del Mundo	Minor role
2017	Karelasyon	young Norma	Episode: "Tukso"
2017	My Love from the Star	Natasha Andrada	Minor role
2017	Kambal, Karibal	Maila	Minor role
2017–2021	Dear Uge	Various	Episode roles
2018	The One That Got Away	Chee	Minor role
2018–2019	Ika-5 Utos	Denise	Recurring role
2019	Sahaya	Fareeda Buenavista	Minor Role / antagonist
2019	The Gift	young Charito	Guest role
2019	Pepito Manaloto	Andrea	Episode: "Room 4 Rent"
2019–2024	Bubble Gang	Herself	Various roles
2019–2022	Tadhana	Various	Episode roles
2020–2021	Anak ni Waray vs. Anak ni Biday	Agatha Escoto Ñedo	Support role / antagonist
2021	My Fantastic Pag-ibig	Malihim	Episode: "Sakalam" (Parts 1 to 3)
2021–2022	Las Hermanas	Scarlet Manansala / Carla Illustre	Main role / Anti-hero
2022–present	All-Out Sundays	Herself	Performer, co-host, various roles
2022–2023	Unica Hija	Carnation Marasigan	Main role / Anti-hero
2022–2023	Happy Together	Jenny	Guest role
2022	Pepito Manaloto: Ang Unang Kwento	Liza	Episode: "Fake BF"
2022–2024	Regal Studio Presents	Various	Episode roles
2023–present	TiktoClock	Herself	Host
2023	Mga Lihim ni Urduja	Khatun Khublun	Main role / antagonist
2023	Maging Sino Ka Man	Bettina "Betty" Ramirez	Main role / Anti-hero
2023	Daig Kayo ng Lola Ko	Empress Joy Frio	Episode: "Joy To The World" (Parts 1 & 2)
2024	Walang Matigas na Pulis sa Matinik na Misis	Jinky	Support role
2025-2026	Encantadia Chronicles: Sang'gre	Sang’gre Flamarra	Main role / protagonist
2025	Stars on the Floor	Herself	Contestant
