= Lilet Matias: Attorney-at-Law =

Philippine television drama series

- Title card
- Genre: Legal drama
- Created by: J-mee Katanyag
- Written by: J-mee Katanyag; Marlon Miguel; Benson Logronio; Jai Shane Cañete; Liberty Trinidad
- Directed by: Adolfo Alix Jr.
- Creative director: Aloy Adlawan
- Starring: Jo Berry
- Theme music composer: Ann Margaret Figueroa
- Opening theme: "May Nagmamahal Sa'yo" by Hannah Precillas
- Country of origin: Philippines
- Original language: Tagalog
- No. of episodes: 258 (list of episodes)

Production
- Executive producer: Arlene Del Rosario-Pilapil
- Camera setup: Multiple-camera setup
- Running time: 23–31 minutes
- Production company: GMA Entertainment Group

Original release
- Network: GMA Network
- Release: March 4, 2024 – February 8, 2025

Lilet Matias: Attorney-at-Law is a Philippine television legal drama series broadcast by GMA Network. Directed by Adolfo Alix Jr., it stars Jo Berry in the title role. It premiered on March 4, 2024 on the network's Afternoon Prime line up. The series concluded on February 8, 2025, with a total of 258 episodes.

The series is originally titled as Atty. Mataas. It is streaming online on YouTube.

== Premise ==
Attorney Lilet Matias sets to deliver justice to the people who are belittled by the public. As she helps defending people from discrimination, abuse and poor living conditions — she will encounter a legal case that will lead to the reopening of her scars from her past.

== Cast and characters ==
Cast

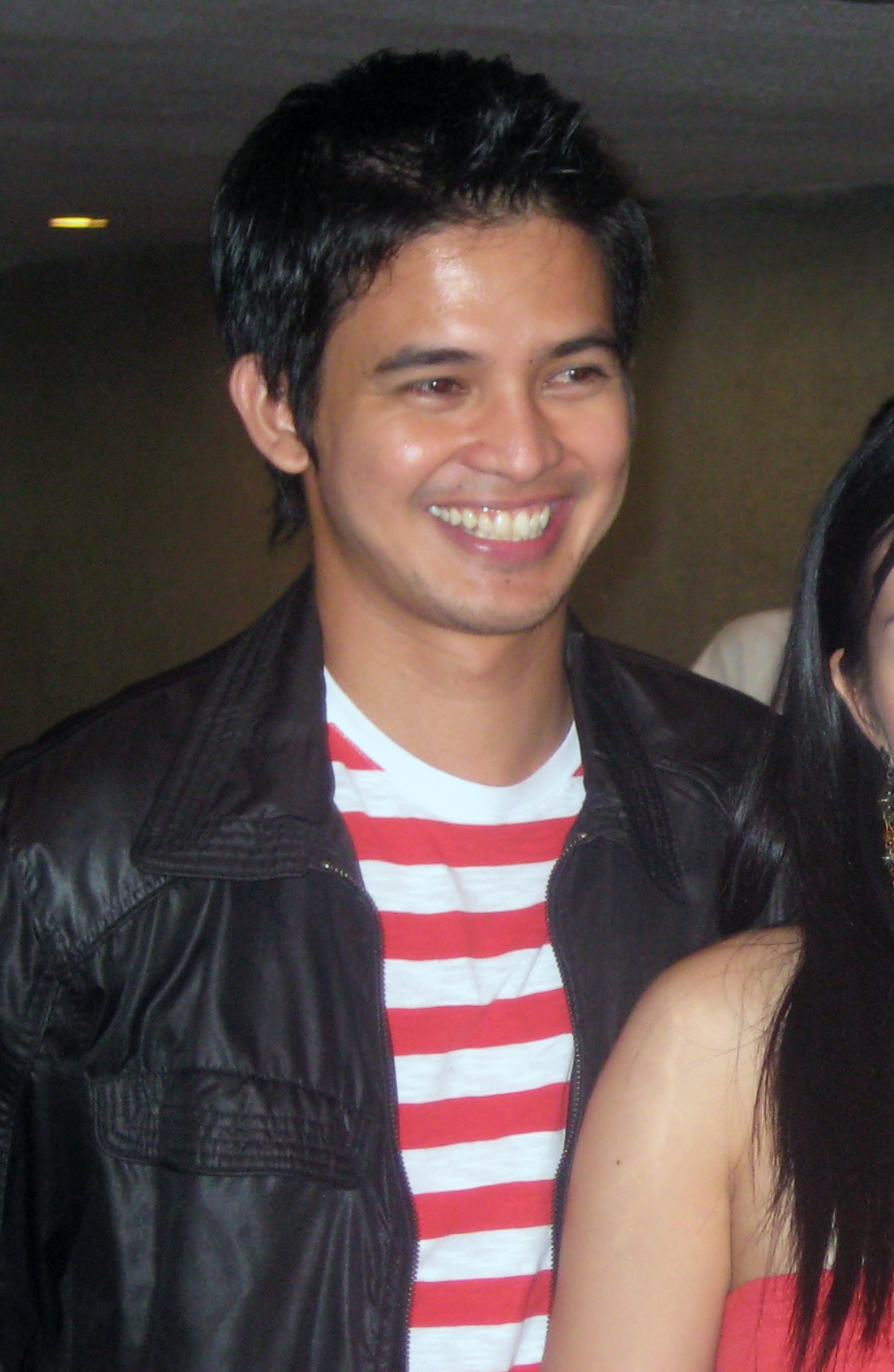
Jason Abalos

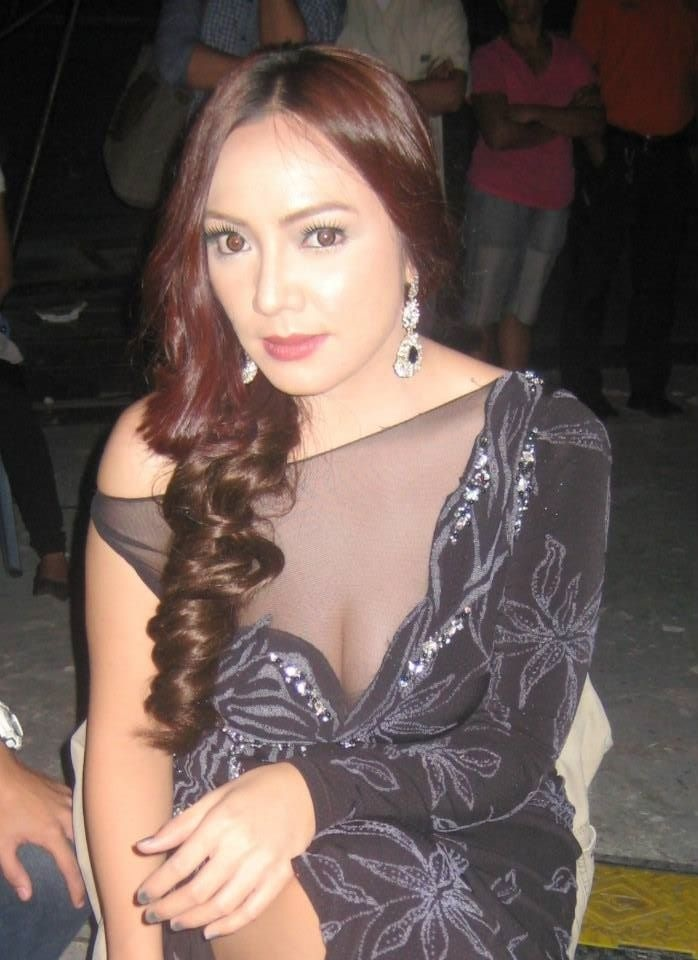
Shermaine Santiago

Lead cast

- Jo Berry as Lilet Mercado-Matias / Lily Magbanua-Engano

Supporting cast

- Sheryl Cruz as Patricia Valdez-Engano
- Bobby Andrews as Ramiro "Ramir" Engano
- Jason Abalos as Bonifacio "Boni" Linao
- Rita Avila as Lorena Sanchez-de Leon
- Maricel Laxa as Meredith "Mer" Magbanua-Simmons
- Analyn Barro as Aera Simmons
- Shermaine Santiago as Leilani "Lani" Baldivino-Matias
- Lloyd Samartino as Constantino de Leon
- Troy Montero as Spanky Macaraig
- Glenda Garcia as Cecilia "Ces / Tinang" Matias
- Jenzel Angeles as Melissa Mariano
- EA Guzman as Kurt Ignacio
- Ariel Villasanta as Raymundo "Emong" Matias
- Joaquin Domagoso as Innocencio "Inno" de Leon
- Zonia Mejia as Trixie Engano
- Hannah Arguelles as Melanie "Melay" Matias

Guest cast

- Martin del Rosario as younger Ramir
- Yvette Sanchez as younger Patricia
- Joyce Ching as younger Ces
- Gina Alajar as Liberty Villaroman
- Nora Aunor as Charito "Chato" Mercado
- Prince Villanueva as Ernest Pascual
- Charee Pineda as Vicky
- Max Collins as Katarina Almodal
- Boboy Garrovillo as Zopronio Azala
- Odette Khan as Serafina Agustin
- Johnny Revilla as Rico Mariano
- Gilleth Sandico as Sally Veloso
- Camille Prats as Monica Umni
- Maybelline dela Cruz as Nymia Ozdemir
- Geraldine Villamil as Edna Montinola
- Ella Cristofani as Melissa's Friend
- Isabel Oli as younger Mer
- Caitlyn Stave as Yurie
- Liezel Lopez as younger Lorena
- Lucho Ayala as younger Constantino
- Bodjie Pascua as Isko
- Mikee Quintos as Lovely "Langgay" Mercado-Veloso
- Royce Cabrera as Ricardo "Karding" Veloso
- Gigi Locsin as Lydia
- Brianna Advincula as younger Langgay
- Juharra Asayo as Hope Umni
- Rocco Nacino as Samson Guerrero
- Winwyn Marquez as Feliz Guerrero
- Lianne Valentin as Aila Ocampo
- Kristoffer Martin as Genesis Ocampo
- Lui Manansala as Luisa Sarabia
- Arra San Agustin as Estar Valencia
- Jon Lucas as Kenneth Briones
- Tom Rodriguez as Renan Alon
- Shyr Valdez as Evelyn Magas
- Benhur Abalos as himself
- Allen Dizon as Tomas
- Rhian Ramos as Mia
- Rita Daniela as Rebecca Palacios
- Jean Garcia as Aurora Palacios
- Maxine Medina as Sabrina
- Rafael Rosell as Alex Romantico
- Janice de Belen as Clarisse Zamora
- Dingdong Dantes
- Kylie Padilla as Marilou Sabanal

== Casting ==
In December 2024, actresses Jean Garcia and Rita Daniela both made an appearance in the series, portraying the same character they played in the Philippine television crime drama series Widows' War.

== Production ==
Principal photography commenced on June 3, 2023.

== Ratings ==
According to AGB Nielsen Philippines' Nationwide Urban Television Audience Measurement People in television homes, the pilot episode of Lilet Matias: Attorney at Law earned an 8.4% rating. The final episode scored an 8% rating.

== Accolades ==
Accolades received by Lilet Matias: Attorney-at-Law
Year	Award	Category	Recipient	Result	Ref.
2024	People's Legacy Awards	Most Outstanding Drama on Disability Rights and Inclusion	Lilet Matias: Attorney-at-Law	Won	
2025	36th PMPC Star Awards for Television	Best Drama Supporting Actress	Glenda Garcia	Pending	
2025	36th PMPC Star Awards for Television	Best Daytime Drama Series	Lilet Matias: Attorney-at-Law	Pending	

== Legacy ==
Actress Jo Berry reprised her role from Lilet Matias: Attorney-at-Law in three television drama series – Widows' War, Mga Batang Riles and Akusada.
