= Mga Lihim ni Urduja =

2023 Philippine television drama series

- Title card
- Genre: Fantasy drama
- Created by: Jojo Nones
- Written by: John Roque; Patrick Ilagan; Renei Dimla
- Directed by: Jorron Lee Monroy
- Creative director: Aloy Adlawan
- Starring: Sanya Lopez; Kylie Padilla; Gabbi Garcia
- Theme music composer: Ann Margaret Figueroa
- Opening theme: "Hiyas" by Jeniffer Maravilla
- Country of origin: Philippines
- Original language: Tagalog
- No. of episodes: 48

Production
- Executive producer: Mona Coles-Mayuga
- Cinematography: Miguel Cruz
- Camera setup: Multiple-camera setup
- Running time: 19–33 minutes
- Production company: GMA Entertainment Group

Original release
- Network: GMA Network
- Release: February 27 – May 5, 2023

Mga Lihim ni Urduja (transl. secrets of Urduja) is a 2023 Philippine television drama fantasy series broadcast by GMA Network. Directed by Jorron Lee Monroy, it stars Sanya Lopez in the title role, Kylie Padilla and Gabbi Garcia. It premiered on February 27, 2023 on the network's Telebabad line up. The series concluded on May 5, 2023, with a total of 48 episodes.

The series is streaming online on YouTube.

== Cast and characters ==
Cast

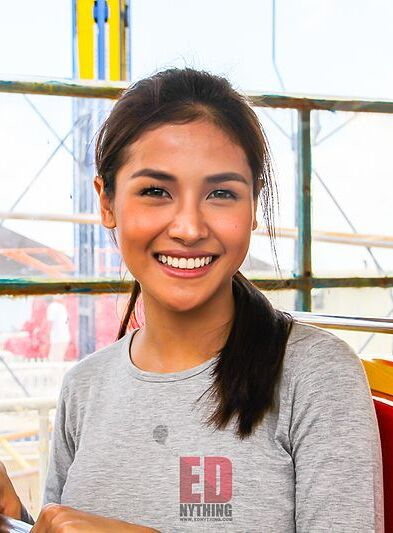
Sanya Lopez

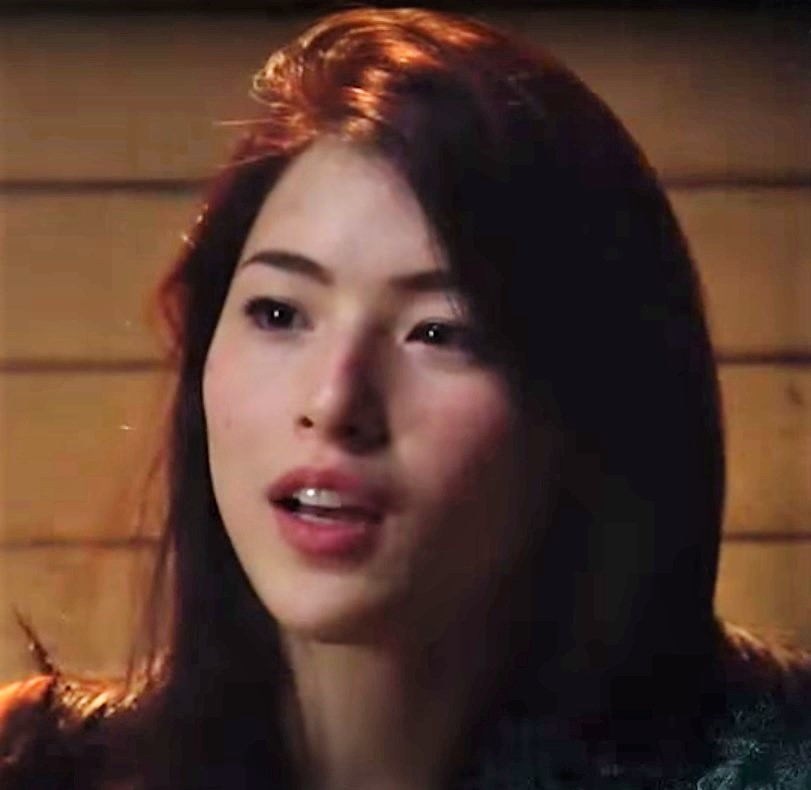
Kylie Padilla

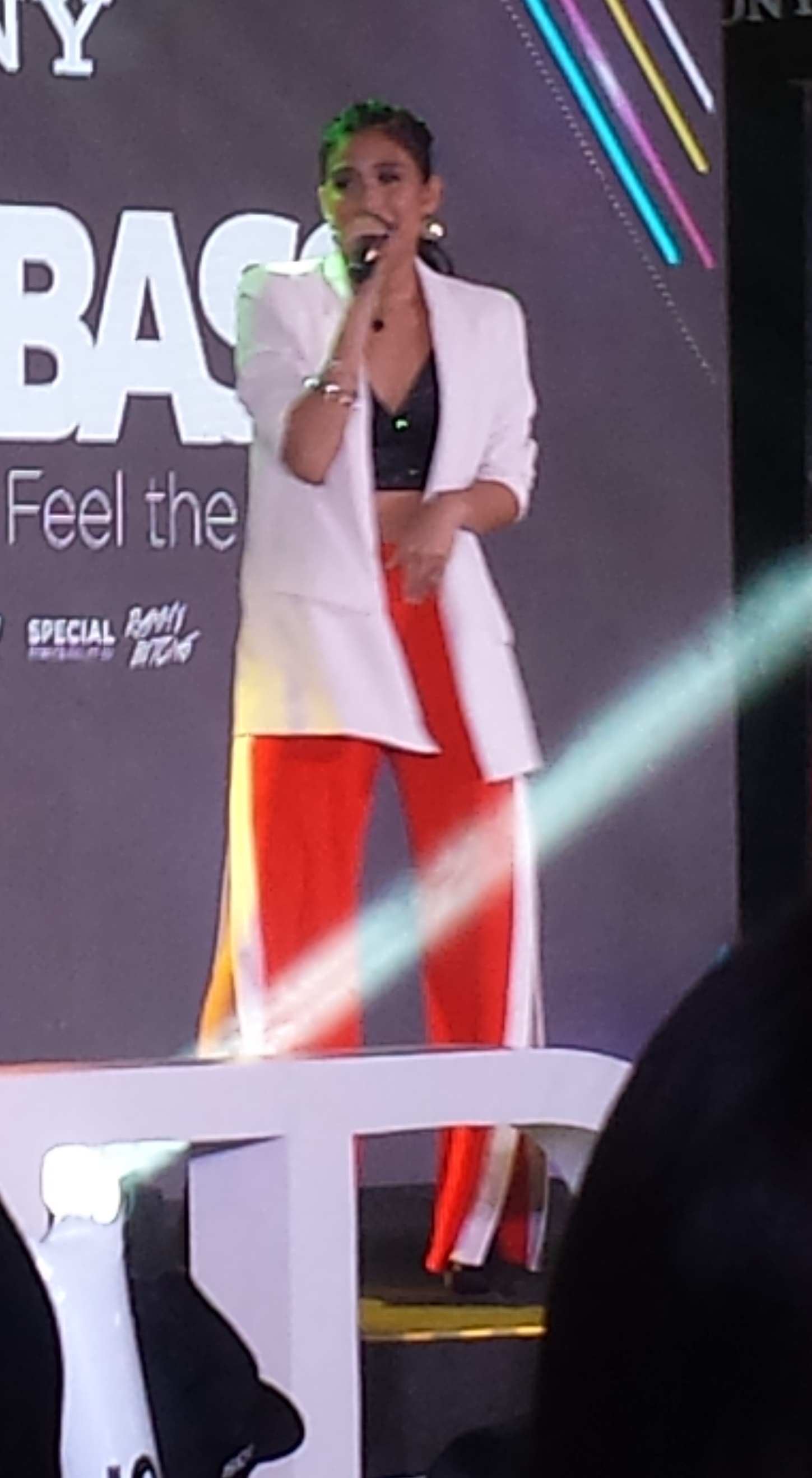
Gabbi Garcia

Lead cast

- Sanya Lopez as Urduja
- Kylie Padilla as Gemma Lynne Davino / Rose Dayanghirang Posadas
- Gabbi Garcia as Crystal Dayanghirang Posadas

Supporting cast

- Zoren Legaspi as Marius "Maestro" Tan / Marcel "Chairman" Batibuttan / Ibn Battuta
- Jeric Gonzales as Greg Sandoval
- Rochelle Pangilinan as Dayang Salaknib
- Arra San Agustin as Valencia Nadales
- Vin Abrenica as Onyx Dayanghirang-Salazar
- Michelle Dee as Freya Dayanghirang-Salazar
- Kristoffer Martin as Ryker Gustillo
- Pancho Magno as Kenzo Diaz
- Ricardo Cepeda as Ernesto "Erning" Davino
- Marina Benipayo as Juliana Davino
- Gina Pareño as Merly Posadas
- Sherilyn Reyes-Tan as Angkat
- Jayson Gainza as Jose / Magat
- Dave Bornea as Enrique Sanchez
- Manolo Pedrosa as Arlo
- Jay Arcilla as Garcia
- Melbelline Caluag as Nanette
- Thou Reyes as Steven "Arki" Padilla
- Billie Hakenson as Astrid Del Valle
- Via Antonio as Christine "Tin" Santiago
- Mosang as Mimang
- Janice Hung as Astra / Bulan
- Ian Ignacio as Moxi
- Luke Conde as Dallego
- Michael Roy Jornales as Villaroman
- JC Tan as Nova
- Rolando Innocencio as Benjamin "Dok" Hipolito

Guest cast

- Sunshine Dizon as Iris Dayanghirang
- Rodjun Cruz as Min Feng
- Faith Da Silva as Khatun Khublun
- Yasser Marta as younger Ibn Battuta
- Tuesday Vargas as Ebony Ventura
- Gee Canlas as Ivory Ventura
- Lawrence dela Cruz as Archie
- Angelo Teves as Bolinao
- Don Rishmond Cerbito
- Claire Castro as Pepper Perez
- Winwyn Marquez as Dayang Iloguin
- Ynez Veneracion as Ina Imperawat

== Production ==
Mga Lihim ni Urduja was first conceptualized as a graphic novel by director Jorron Lee Monroy. According to Monroy, the series used filming technologies used from the United States.

Principal photography commenced in January 2023. According to the series' virtual production director Cedric Hornedo, the usage of real-time virtual production technology was implemented for the extension of the set.

== Ratings ==
According to AGB Nielsen Philippines' Nationwide Urban Television Audience Measurement People in television homes, the pilot episode of Mga Lihim ni Urduja earned a 9.6% rating. The final episode scored a 10% rating.

== Accolades ==
Accolades received by Mga Lihim ni Urduja
Year	Award	Category	Recipient	Result	Ref.
2024	5th VP Choice Awards	TV Actress of the Year (Primetime)	Sanya Lopez	Nominated	
2025	37th PMPC Star Awards for Television	Best Supporting Drama Actor	Kristoffer Martin	Nominated	
