= Migo Adecer =

Filipino-Australian actor (born 1999)

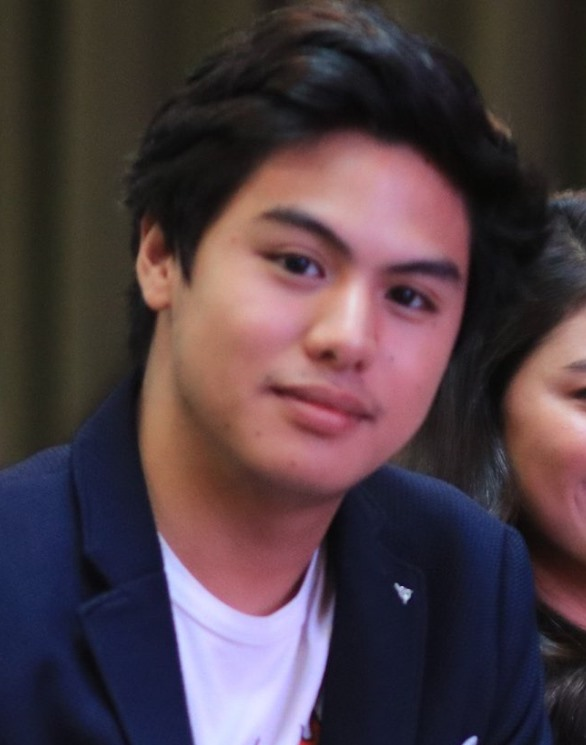
- Adecer in 2020
- Born: Douglas Errol Dreyfus Adecer; December 20, 1999 (age 26); Bacolod, Philippines
- Citizenship: Filipino-Australian
- Occupations: Actor, dancer, model
- Years active: 2015–2021
- Agent: Sparkle GMA Artist Center (2015–2021)
- Height: 6 ft 2 in (188 cm)
- Spouse: Katrina Mercado (m. 2021)
- Parents: Dennis Adecer (father); Kaye Dreyfus (mother)
- Relatives: Chuckie Dreyfus (cousin)

Douglas Errol "Migo" Dreyfus Adecer (born December 20, 1999) is a Filipino-Australian actor, singer and host. He was the "Ultimate Male Survivor" (male winner) of the sixth season (2015) of the talent competition show StarStruck. He has since appeared on several of GMA's teleseryes.

== Early life ==
Douglas Errol Dreyfus Adecer was born on December 20, 1999, in Bacolod, Philippines, and was raised in Sydney, Australia. He has three siblings and his parents are administration customer associates for an insurance company in Australia. His mother is from Mansilingan, Bacolod City while his father originally hailed from Cagayan de Oro.

== Career ==
=== Acting career ===
In 2012, Adecer became a part of Glee CLUB Australia. Adecer was discovered and currently being managed by Kuh Ledesma who encouraged him to audition for StarStruck.

In 2015, Adecer joined the sixth season of the reality show StarStruck. Adecer was named the "Ultimate Male Survivor" and was proclaimed the "Ultimate Survivors" with Klea Pineda. They both received ₱ 1,000,000 cash prize, a house and lot from Camella Homes and a 5-year contract. Adecer and Pineda were also announced to join the cast of the 2016 retelling-sequel of Encantadia.

In 2016, Adecer portrayed Anthony in Encantadia. Adecer portrayed Yuan in the Philippine adaptation of My Love from the Star.

=== Music career ===
In 2016, Adecer signed an album contract with GMA Records (now GMA Music).

== Personal life ==
When he was in Australia, Adecer was a working student and dreamed of becoming a dentist or pilot. He is a fan of singer Sarah Geronimo and actor Aga Muhlach.

In April 2021, he left showbiz and returned to Australia to finish his studies and spend time with his family. On December 30, 2021, he married to Katrina Mercado.

=== Controversies ===
On March 26, 2019, Adecer was arrested by police in Makati after hitting two Metro Manila Development Authority (MMDA) employees while driving and then hitting a police car during his attempt to flee. Police reported that the actor was drunk, unruly, and refused to surrender his driver's license. He was charged for reckless imprudence resulting in physical injuries and damage to properties and disobedience to a person in authority. He later apologized and offered to shoulder the victims' medical expenses. The two victims eventually forgave him.

== Filmography ==
=== Television ===
==== Drama ====
Year	Title	Role
2016	Maynila: All About Space	Norson
2016	Dear Uge: Barangayan	Benjie
2016	Dear Uge: Two 'Nay	Xian
2016	Maynila: Like and Share	Clide
2016	Encantadia	Anthony Monteclaro
2017	My Love from the Star	Yuan Federico Chavez
2018	The One That Got Away	Samuel "Sam" Isaac
2018–2019	Ika-5 Utos	Francis Buenaventura
2018	Barangay 143	Bren Park / Dubbed Voice
2019	Sahaya	Jordan Alvarez
2020–2021	Anak ni Waray vs. Anak ni Biday	Cocoy Tolentino
2020	Project Destination	Andre
2021	My Fantastic Pag-ibig: Exchange of Hearts	Popoy
2021	Heartful Café	Charles / Max

==== Reality, variety and talk shows ====
Year	Title	Notes
2015	StarStruck	Contestant, "Ultimate Male Survivor"
2018–2019	Studio 7	Himself / Performer
2020–2021	All-Out Sundays	Himself

== Accolades ==
Year	Association	Category	Nominated work	Result
2017	31st PMPC Star Awards for Television	Best New Male TV Personality	Encantadia	Nominated

Awards and achievements
Preceded by Steven Silva	StarStruck Ultimate Male Survivor; 2015 (season 6)	Succeeded by Kim de Leon
