= URL: Usapang Real Love =

2016 Philippine television drama series

- Title card
- Genre: Drama; Romantic comedy
- Creative director: Rommel Gacho
- Country of origin: Philippines
- Original language: Tagalog
- No. of episodes: 14

Production
- Executive producer: Maria Luisa Cadag
- Production locations: Quezon City, Philippines
- Camera setup: Multiple-camera setup
- Running time: 29–36 minutes
- Production company: GMA Entertainment TV

Original release
- Network: GMA Network
- Release: September 25 – December 18, 2016

URL: Usapang Real Love (transl. URL: discussing real love) is a 2016 Philippine television drama romantic comedy anthology series broadcast by GMA Network. It premiered on September 25, 2016. The series concluded on December 18, 2016, with a total of 14 episodes.

The series is streaming online on YouTube.

== Chapters ==
=== "Dream Date" ===
- Original air date: September 25, 2016 - October 16, 2016
- Director: Real Florido
- Cast and characters:

Miguel Tanfelix as Diego Cablao
Bianca Umali as Grace Anne Manalo
Jak Roberto as Juan Miguel Samaniego
Ces Quesada as Mercidita Delgado
Jade Lopez as Lily Anne Manalo
Yayo Aguila as Gina Cablao
Lloyd Samartino as Fabian Samaniego
Gene Padilla as Mario Cablao
Caprice Cayetano as Diana Daenarys Cablao
Jonathan Sebastian Trinidad as Biboy

=== "Perfect Fit" ===
- Original air date: October 23, 2016 - November 20, 2016
- Director: Jorron Lee Monroy
- Cast and characters:

Andre Paras as Eugene
Mikee Quintos as Cindy and Ella
Jay Arcilla as Kristoff
Arra San Agustin as Meg
Mickey Ferriols as Amanda Lace
William Lorenzo as Fred
Bekimon as Chicklet
Vince Gamad as Jose
Dayara Shane as Athena
Bryce Eusebio as younger Eugene

=== "Relationship Goals" ===
- Original air date: November 27, 2016 - December 18, 2016
- Director: Lemuel Lorca
- Cast and characters:

Aljur Abrenica as Kiso
Janine Gutierrez as Yapi
Stephanie Sol as Angel
Sherilyn Reyes as Queen
Dennis Padilla as Ricky
Maricel Morales as Veronique
Mikoy Morales as Alon
Lovely Abella as Aimee
Kyle Vergara as Roni
Allysa De Real as Buttercup
Jenny Catchong as Bubbles
Bryan Benedict as Will
Kai Atienza as Ali
Sarah Pagcaliwagan as Diane

== Ratings ==
According to AGB Nielsen Philippines' Urban Luzon household television ratings, the pilot episode of URL: Usapang Real Love earned a 12.8% rating. The final episode scored a 10.2% rating in Nationwide Urban Television Audience Measurement People in television homes.
