= Analyn Barro =

Filipina actress (born 1996)

- Born: Analyn Barro Tabucanon; August 15, 1996 (age 30); Bacolod, Negros Occidental, Philippines
- Other names: Anabanana, Anastasia
- Occupation: Actress
- Years active: 2015–present
- Known for: 6th season of StarStruck; Mina in My Love from the Star; Bubble Gang

Analyn Barro Tabucanon (born August 15, 1996) is a Filipino actress who became known after joining the sixth season of GMA Network's reality-based talent competition, StarStruck. Once labelled as "Crush ng Bayan", she is currently a mainstay of the sketch comedy program Bubble Gang.

== Career ==
When Barro was 18 years old, she and her friends were at SM City Bacolod when they saw that auditions for the sixth season of the reality show StarStruck were being held there. On a whim, they decided to audition for fun. However, when she passed the auditions, she decided to quit school temporarily and left Bacolod to join the show. On StarStruck, she was among the final eight to be eliminated, as she failed a comedy skit challenge.

After her StarStruck journey, she landed her first regular show on the primetime series Once Again, and also had guest appearances on the shows A1 Ko Sa 'Yo and Maynila. She became an antagonist as Miley, accomplice best friend of Ariana (played by Ashley Ortega) in the afternoon series Oh, My Mama!. In 2016, she played a third wheel to the DerBea loveteam in the weekend primetime fantasy series Tsuperhero, In 2017, she joined the sketch comedy program Bubble Gang, where she would become a mainstay known for playing comedic sexy characters. She also starred as Mina, the friend of Jennylyn Mercado's character, Steffi, in the hit Philippine television remake, My Love from the Star. She portrayed Tina, best friend of Rachel (played by Kris Bernal) in the 2018 afternoon series Asawa Ko, Karibal Ko.

Barro then portrayed Gemrose Reyes, an antagonist in the 2021 primetime series First Yaya and its sequel First Lady. In 2022, she and several of her castmates from First Lady won on an episode of Family Feud. She portrayed the anti-heroic lawyer Aera Simmons in the 2024 afternoon series Lilet Matias: Attorney-at-Law, a role she was able to draw from her family background of lawyers. She also won a Breakthrough Star of the Year award from the VP Choice Awards for that role. In 2025, Barro and Starstruck batchmate Arra San Agustin starred together in a music video for the band Mayonnaise.

== Personal life ==
Barro is from Ormoc City. She is Visayan and Ilongo. As a Visayan, she has experienced discrimination for her accent.

In 2019, Barro graduated with a Bachelor of Science degree in Business Administration, Major in Marketing Management from Trinity University of Asia.

== Filmography ==
=== Film ===
Year	Title	Role	Ref.
2021	Izla	Lani	
2026	He's Dating a Bold Star	Kit Santana	

=== Television series ===
Year	Title	Role
2016	Once Again	Diana "Daday" Gonzalvo
2016	A1 Ko Sa 'Yo	Elevator Girl
2016	Oh, My Mama!	Miley
2016—2017	Tsuperhero	Anna
2017	My Love from the Star	Mina
2017—present	Bubble Gang	Herself (mainstay)
2018	Sherlock Jr.	Liz
2018	Pepito Manaloto	Multo
2018—2019	Asawa Ko, Karibal Ko	Tina Santos-Santiago
2019	Hanggang sa Dulo ng Buhay Ko	Tyra Espiritu
2021	First Yaya	Gemrose Reyes
2022	First Lady	Gemrose Reyes-Agcaoili
2022—2023	Nakarehas na Puso	Charlotte Cruz-Galang
2023	The Write One	Megan
2023	Black Rider	Victim
2024–2025	Lilet Matias: Attorney-at-Law	Aera Simmons
2024	My Guardian Alien	Aera Simmons
2026	Never Say Die	Golda Briones

=== Television anthologies ===
Year	Title	Role
2019	Dear Uge: Boom-taran-tan-trans	Rosalinda
2019	Tadhana: Serial Killer	Hannah
2019	Dear Uge: Chubby yutiful	Mila
2019	Magpakailanman: Kailan Naging Ama ang isang Babae (The Roxanne D' Salles Epic Story)	Mae
2019	Magpakailanman: Viral Macho Dancer (The Dante Gulapa Story)	Edna
2021	Regal Studio Presents: Ikaw si Ako, Ako si Ikaw	Wendy
2025	Tadhana: Family Affairs	Marnie

=== Music videos ===
Year	Song	Artist	Ref.
2025	"Hanggang Sa Magunaw Ang Mundo"	Mayonnaise	

== Accolades ==
Awards and nominations received by Analyn Barros
Award	Year	Category	Nominated work	Result	Ref.
VIP Choice Awards	2025	Breakthrough Star of the Year	Lilet Matias: Attorney-at-Law	Won	
