= James Teng =

Filipino teen actor and model

- Born: James Matthew Teng; February 3, 1998 (age 28); Marilao, Bulacan, Philippines
- Other name: James
- Education: St. Michael Academy
- Occupations: Actor, Student, Model
- Years active: 2015–2021
- Agent: GMA Artist Center

James Matthew Teng (born on February 3, 1998, in Marilao, Bulacan, Philippines) is a Filipino teen actor and model who rose to fame in the sixth season of StarStruck. He is currently seen and has a semi-exclusive contract on GMA Network.

== Career and personal life ==
Teng just graduated high school before joining StarStruck. He already works as a model. His list of hobbies includes guitar and basketball. He is the nephew of the Basketball Legend Alvin Teng and the cousin of Jeric Teng and Jeron Teng. He was eliminated on November 6, 2015, and came in eleventh place as the fourth avenger.

== Filmography ==
Year	Title	Role
2015	StarStruck	Himself
2016	Ismol Family	Nathan
2016	That's My Amboy	Josh
2016	A1 Ko Sa 'Yo	Samuel
2016	Maynila	Ricky
2016	Magpakailanman	Boyet
2016	Encantadia	Pakô
2016	Alyas Robin Hood	Miggy "Calot" Arguellas
2017	Destined to be Yours	James
2017	Wattpad Presents: Just The Strings	Parker
2017	Daig Kayo ng Lola Ko	Andrew
2019	Love You Two	Louie
2019	One of the Baes	Amador "Amay" Amador
