= Prince Villanueva =

Filipino actor

- Born: Prince Allan Ray Eugenio Villanueva; August 21, 1998 (age 27); Manila, Philippines
- Occupations: Actor; performer
- Years active: 2014–present
- Known for: Walang Tulugan with the Master Showman
- Awards: Nominated, Best New Male TV Personality, PMPC Star Awards for Television

Prince Allan Ray Eugenio Villanueva (born August 21, 1998) is a Filipino actor. He used to be co-managed by German Moreno and GMA Artist Center until the time of the former's demise, which made him one of the last talent discoveries by Moreno.

== Early life ==
Prince Villanueva is a Filipino actor, born in Manila, Philippines on August 21, 1998. He is the only son of Allan Villanueva and Lizelle Eugenio Villanueva, Mrs. Philippines International 2009. He has an older sister, Precious and younger sister, Princess. He finished grade school and high school at Adamson University. At present, he is in second year college taking up B.S. Business Administration major in Marketing Management in the same university.

== Career ==
Prince started very young in front of the camera, having won the title SM Star Baby 1998 when he was only six months old. The contest was a segment in Brunch, a morning show hosted by Bing Loyzaga and Michelle van Eimeren, aired on GMA Network. Growing up, he has been continuously getting the nods of many whenever he competes for a title in school pageants like being Star of the Night in his JS Prom, Mr. Intramurals, among others. His natural inclination for entertainment is a product of genetic endowment because both of his parents were models and actors in the past. Prince went to many casting calls for commercials and television shows, until he found his niche in GMA Network when he auditioned for Walang Tulugan with the Master Showman in August 2014.

Having only three months of television exposure in 2014, Prince was already nominated Best New Male TV Personality 2014 in the 28th PMPC Star Awards for Television, held at Solaire Resort and Casino, and was aired by ABS-CBN. Presently, Prince is an exclusive contract artist of GMA Network and is managed by GMA Artist Center. He was first seen on TV show Walang Tulugan with the Master Showman, where he displayed his singing, hosting, and dancing prowess, from 2014 until the show closes in 2016. The TV series InstaDad in 2014 introduced Prince as Ikot, his first character role as a GMA artist. After that, he was seen again on GMA's afternoon prime Wish I May as Dave. As of this writing, Prince is a mainstay of the top rating, primetime show Alyas Robin Hood as Rex.

He has also engaged into theater acting, as he is playing lead role in a stage play entitled Aquarium na Walang Tubig, under the direction of veteran actress and acting coach Anne Villegas of the Sining Pinagpala Theater Foundation.

== Filmography ==
=== Television ===
Year	Title	Role
2024	Shining Inheritance	Lawrence Sulit-Almerio
2024	Lilet Matias: Attorney-at-Law	Ernest Pascual
2018	Sherlock Jr.	Ron
2018	#MichaelAngelo	Jake Pord
2017	Imbestigador	Harvey
2017	Magpakailanman: Ang Pagmamahal ng Isang Amang Beki	Harvey
2017	Alyas Robin Hood	Rex
2017	Pepito Manaloto	Tonyo
2017	Imbestigador: Chop Chop sa San Mateo	Alvin
2017	Karelasyon: Biglang Yaman	Mario
2017	Yu-Gi-Oh! 5D's	Leo (Voice Only)
2016	Magpakailanman: Finding Earl	Carlos
2016	Alyas Robin Hood	Rex
2016	Imbestigador: UPLB Rape Case	Rod
2016	A1 Ko Sa 'Yo	Thor
2016	Maynila: Secret Bratinella	Marco
2016	Wish I May	Dave
2015	Magpakailanman: Paskong Malamig Ang Puso	Raul
2015	Magpakailanman: Asawa ni Mister, Kabit ni Misis	Arlan
2015	Maynila: Signs of Love	Patrick
2015	InstaDad	Ikot Perez
2015	Maynila: Moments In Time	Rico
2014	Magpakailanman: Sa Bangin ng Kamatayan	George
2014	The Half Sisters	Dexter
2014	Walang Tulugan with the Master Showman	Himself / Performer / Co-Host

=== Theatre ===
Year	Title	Role
2016	Aquarium Na Walang Tubig	Dennis

=== Film ===
Year	Title	Role
2025	Ang Aking Mga Anak	

== Awards and nominations ==
Prince Villanueva
Year	Award	Category	Result
2014	28th PMPC Star Awards for Television	Best New Male TV Personality for Walang Tulugan with the Master Showman	Nominated

=== Endorsements ===
- Unisilver Time (HEA)
- Apple Peel Facial Care and Spa
- RMES Salon
