= Avery Paraiso =

Filipino-American commercial model

- Born: September 22, 1994 (age 31); Honolulu, Hawaii, U.S.
- Occupations: Actor model
- Years active: 2014–present
- Agents: Star Magic (2014); GMA Artist Center (2015–2017)
- Known for: Role as Chandler in Because of You; Role as Kahlil in Encantadia

Avery Philips Paraiso (Note: Avery Paraiso was born in the United States. Thus, she does not possess her mother's maiden name.) (born September 22, 1994) is a Filipino-American commercial model and actor who is best known as one of the Top 14 finalists of the sixth season of StarStruck.

Before joining the reality show, Paraiso already appeared in several commercial shoots as a model. He considers his hair an advantage because aside from the fact that it is "low maintenance", it has won him roles in commercials before.

== Early life and career beginnings ==
Paraiso was born in Honolulu, Hawaii, U.S. to an Irish mother and a Filipino father and but was raised in the Philippines since age three. Even at a young age, says Avery, he would always watch television and wonder what it would be like to be in front of the camera and be a household name.

He graduated from the Montessori Integrated School of Antipolo and is studying Mass Communication in La Salle Antipolo, has been working since he was 14. When he was 16, he got into commercials, and began acting at 17. He also won the Circle of 10 model search in 2009.

In 2013, Paraiso also appeared regularly in a variety show in PAGCOR, called Not Your Ordinary Variety Show. It is staged in different PAGCOR casinos around the country and features the Not Your Ordinary Boys and Girls members in specially-mounted production numbers where they get to show off their dancing and hosting skills. They also do some ramp modeling. His group, the Not Your Ordinary Boys and Girls is composed of six boys and two girls, including StarStruck season 5's Ian Batherson, took up various workshops under Direk Laurice Guillen, Mr. Pen Medina, Ms. Annie Quintos of The Company, G-Force and Mr. Boy Abunda. The group is managed by Backroom Incorporated. As defined in its official website, Backroom Inc. is "...one of the country’s most successful companies in artist booking and career management, public relations, promotions, multi-media publicity, and concert production."

In 2014, Paraiso also appeared in the film Once a Princess, in which Erich Gonzales plays the lead role. Paraiso has a featured minor role as a bully.

=== 2015–present: StarStruck VI ===
Paraiso joins in Eew Stories on Carefree Pantiliners, After more than a five-year-long hiatus, GMA Network re-launched StarStruck for its sixth season. Upon learning that the age limit is set from 15 years old to 20 years old, Avery decided to join the reality show and said that no one pressured him to join. He vocally expresses his interest in joining StarStruck since then.

At the show's pilot episode, Avery was declared as part of the official line of semifinalists, emerging from Top 35 to top 28 contestants. He was joined by Koreen Medina and Klea Pineda in the episode.

In 2016, he joined the cast of the hit telefantasya, Encantadia as Kahlil, originally played by Jake Cuenca in Encantadia (2005).

== Filmography ==
=== Television ===
Year	Title	Role	Note
2015	StarStruck VI	Himself/Contestant	7th/8th Avenger
2015	Because of You	Chandler	First daily role
2016	Hanggang Makita Kang Muli	Marlon Santos	Supporting role
2016	Dear Uge	Miggy	Episode Role
2016	Sinungaling Mong Puso	Nick	Guest Cast
2016-2017	Encantadia	Kahlil	Supporting Role

=== Movies ===
Year	Title	Role	Note
2014	Once a Princess	Neil	

== See also ==
- StarStruck (Philippine TV series)
- StarStruck (season 6)
