= Once a Princess =

- Film poster
- Directed by: Laurice Guillen
- Screenplay by: Anna Karenina Ramos; Enrico C. Santos
- Story by: Angel Bautista
- Based on: Once a Princess by Angel Bautista
- Produced by: Charo Santos-Concio; Malou N. Santos; Lily Y. Monteverde; Roselle Y. Monteverde-Teo; Enrico C. Santos
- Starring: Enchong Dee; Erich Gonzales; JC de Vera
- Cinematography: Monino S. Duque
- Edited by: Efren "Lodging" Jarlego
- Music by: Jessie Lasaten
- Production companies: ABS-CBN Film Productions; Regal Films; Skylight Films
- Distributed by: Star Cinema
- Release date: August 6, 2014
- Running time: 115 minutes
- Country: Philippines
- Language: Filipino

Once a Princess is a 2014 Filipino romantic drama film directed by Laurice Guillen from a screenplay written by Anna Karenina Ramos and Enrico C. Santos, based on Angel Bautista's novel with the same name. It stars Enchong Dee, Erich Gonzales, and JC de Vera, with the supporting cast include Ian Veneracion, Bing Pimentel, Angel Aquino, Matt Evans, and Nikki Valdez.

Produced by ABS-CBN Film Productions, Regal Films and Skylight Films, with Star Cinema as a distributor, the film was theatrically released on August 6, 2014.

== Plot ==
Erin Almeda comes from a rich family and is always known as "Princess". She breaks up with her geeky high school classmate Leonard Jamieson by pretending that she was only using him after a family crisis that required the help of the influential family of his high school rival Damian. Leonard is driven to attempt suicide, tormenting Erin with guilt. When Leonard wakes up, Erin is thrown out of his hospital room.

Seven years later, Leonard, now a wealthy executive, employs Erin, now a financially struggling housewife who is married to a now disreputable Damian. After Leonard initially orders her to do excessive tasks, they slowly rekindle their relationship before Erin explains why she left him. Learning of this and realizing how miserable her life has been since then, Leonard urges Erin to resume their love, which Erin is reluctant to do. Damian later discovers Leonard and Erin's renewed relationship and tries to kill Erin in an act of rage, only to be stopped by Leonard. Erin and Damian mutually break up peacefully afterward, and Erin becomes together with Leonard once again.

== Cast ==
=== Main cast ===
- Erich Gonzales as Erin Almeda
- Enchong Dee as Leonard Jamieson
- JC de Vera as Damian Albert

=== Supporting cast ===
- Ian Veneracion as Anton
- Bing Pimentel as Rosalie
- Angel Aquino as Maritess
- Matt Evans as Ricky
- Tippy Dos Santos as Nina
- Nikki Valdez as Myrna
- Bryan Santos as Teddy
- Eda Nolan as Kristine

=== Guest cast ===
- Myrtle Sarrosa as Helen
- Akiko Solon as Jackie
- Annika Dolonius as Mischa
- Avery Paraiso as Neil
- John Uy as Morris
- Marx Topacio as Rommel
- Althea Guanzon as Sofia
