= My Love from the Star (Philippine TV series) =

2017 Philippine television series

- Title card
- Genre: Romantic fantasy; Comedy drama
- Based on: My Love from the Star (2013) by Park Ji-eun
- Written by: Des Garbes-Severino; Onay Sales; Kutz Enriquez
- Directed by: Joyce E. Bernal
- Creative director: Roy Iglesias
- Starring: Jennylyn Mercado; Gil Cuerva
- Theme music composer: Jin Myoung Yong
- Opening theme: "My Destiny" by Maricris Garcia
- Country of origin: Philippines
- Original language: Tagalog
- No. of episodes: 55

Production
- Executive producer: Joy Lumboy-Pili
- Editors: Robert Ryan Reyes; Benedict Lavastida
- Camera setup: Multiple-camera setup
- Running time: 25–40 minutes
- Production company: GMA Entertainment TV

Original release
- Network: GMA Network
- Release: May 29 – August 11, 2017

My Love from the Star is a 2017 Philippine television drama comedy romantic fantasy series broadcast by GMA Network. The series is based on a 2013 South Korean television series of the same title. Directed by Joyce E. Bernal, it stars Jennylyn Mercado and Gil Cuerva. It premiered on May 29, 2017 on the network's Telebabad line up. The series concluded on August 11, 2017, with a total of 55 episodes.

The series is streaming online on YouTube.

== Premise ==
400 years ago, Matteo's spaceship crash-landed on Earth. Since then, he lives on Earth while eagerly waiting for beings from his planet to take him back home. Three months before his expected departure from Earth, he encounters Steffi. At first, they don't get along, but will eventually have feelings for one another and fall in love.

== Cast and characters ==
Cast

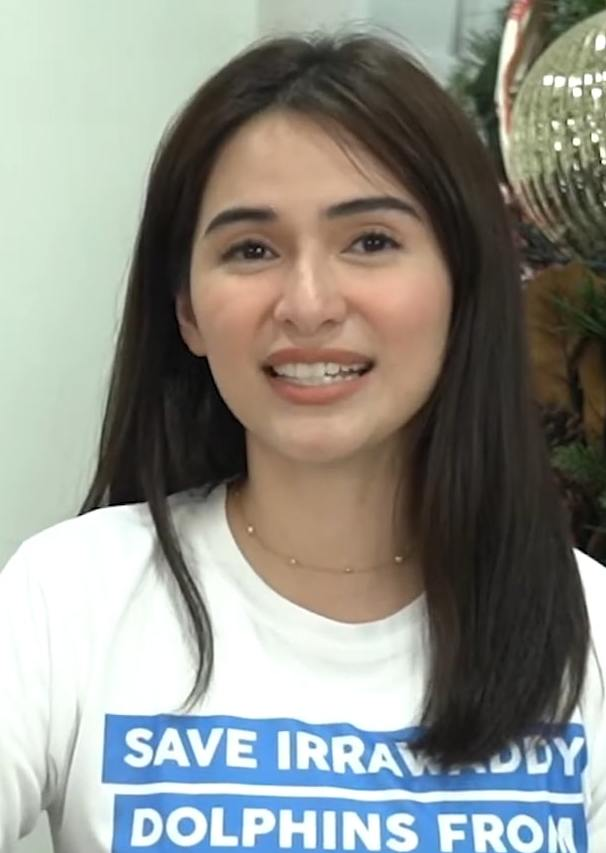
Jennylyn Mercado

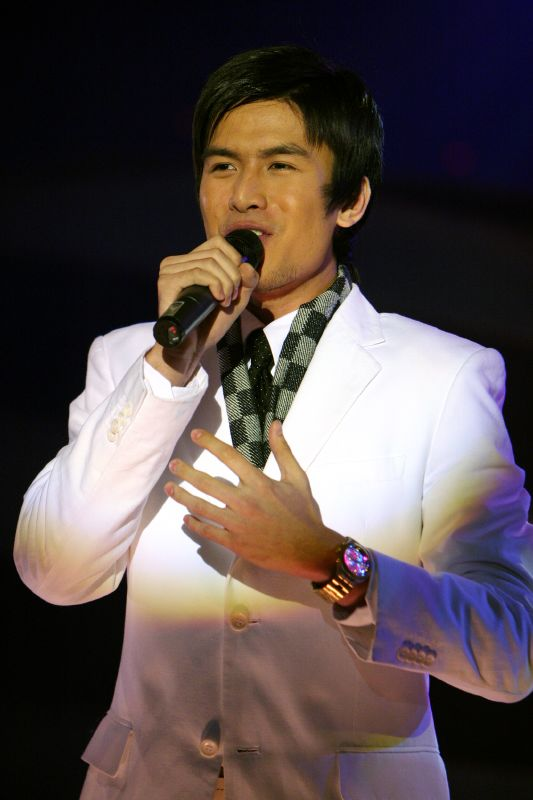
Christian Bautista

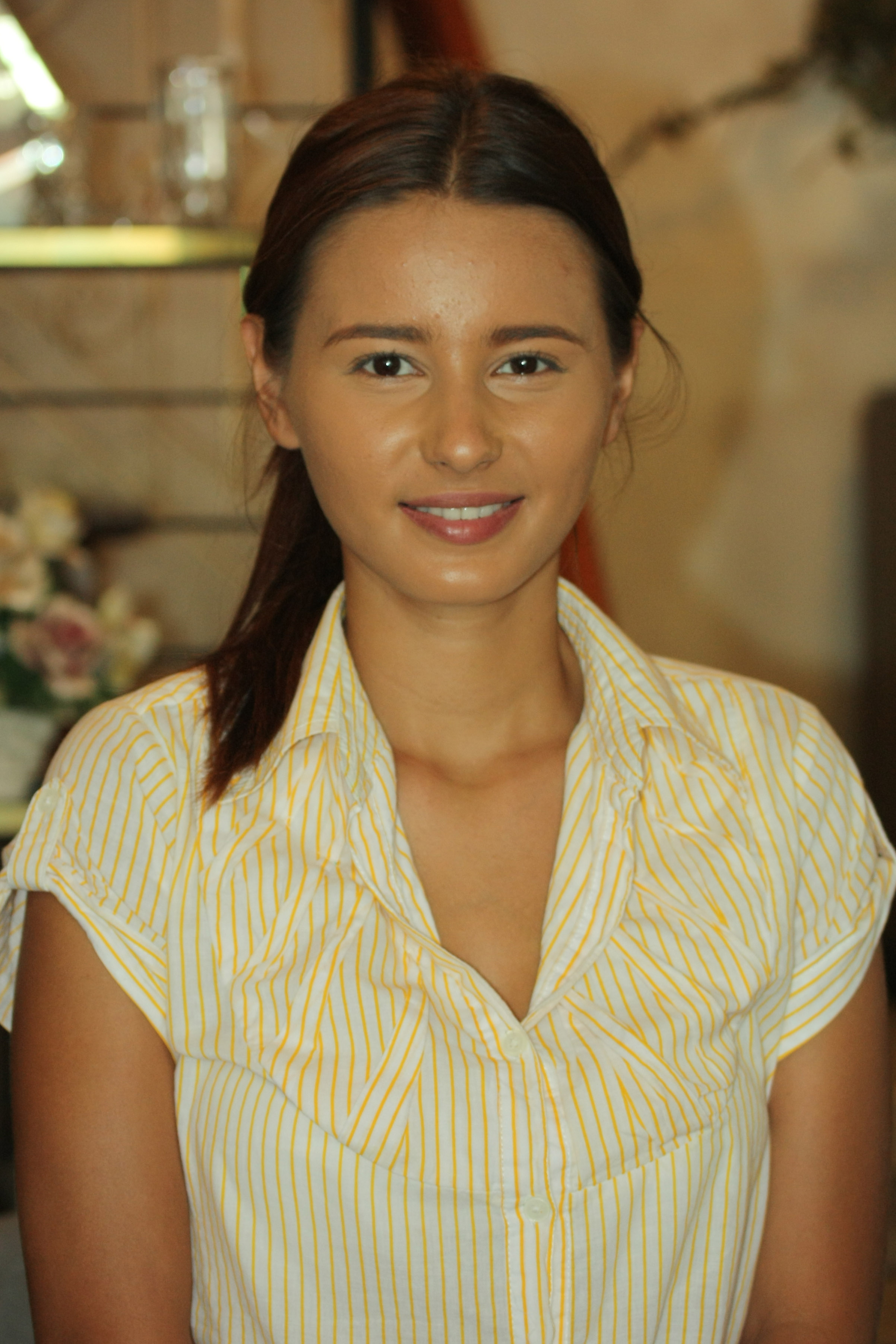
Jackie Rice

Lead cast

- Jennylyn Mercado as Steffanie Elaine "Steffi" Chavez
- Gil Cuerva as Matteo Domingo

Supporting cast

- Gabby Eigenmann as Jackson Libredo
- Christian Bautista as Winston Libredo
- Jackie Rice as Lucy Yuzon
- Rhian Ramos as Rachel Andrada
- Glydel Mercado as Elena "Lynelle" Chavez
- Melissa Mendez as Doris Yuzon
- Spanky Manikan and Crispin Pineda as Juan "Jang" Avanado
- Renz Fernandez as Peter Yuzon
- Migo Adecer as Yuan Federico Chavez
- Nar Cabico as Jun
- Analyn Barro as Mina
- Valentin as Ricardo Park
- Moi Bien as Kathy

Guest cast

- Pauline Mendoza as Marcella Infante / younger Steffi
- Arrel Mendoza as Dominic Antonio
- Lope Juban as Ronaldo Libredo
- Lynn Ynchausti-Cruz as Loreta Libredo
- Ken Alfonso as Lester Hernandez
- Alvin Ronquillo as Pato
- Ashley Mendoza as Jeto
- Martin Buen as Evan
- Princess Guevarra as Jennifer Abuzo
- Lao Rodriguez as Rey
- Renz Verano as Marlon "Minggo" Chavez
- Dianne Medina as Kristine "K" Libredo
- Adrian Pascual as younger Winston
- Lindsay de Vera as younger Lucy
- Simon Ibarra as Arnaldo Infante
- Frances Makil-Ignacio as Leonora Infante
- Rolly Innocencio as Onat
- Maricris Garcia as Shanel Luz-Meneses
- Will Devaughn as Yugo Meneses
- Liezel Lopez as Juana Jimenez
- Ermie Concepcion as Maria Jimenez
- Dante Ponce as Ramon Perez
- Ces Aldaba as Cipriano
- Bryan Benedict as Pontenciano Infante
- Faith da Silva as Natasha Andrada
- Manuel Chua as Nick
- Joemarie Nielsen as younger Jang
- Phytos Ramirez as Fidel Perez
- David Uy as a doctor
- Barbie Forteza as a guest at the awards show
- Ken Chan as a guest at the awards' night
- Jak Roberto as a guest at the awards show
- Ivan Dorschner as a guest at the awards show

== Ratings ==
My Love from the Star ratings
No.	AGB Nielsen NUTAM People	Original air date
1	11.0%	May 29, 2017
2	10.9%	May 30, 2017
3	10.0%	May 31, 2017
4	11.1%	June 1, 2017
5	10.3%	June 2, 2017
6	8.8%	June 5, 2017
7	8.8%	June 6, 2017
8	8.6%	June 7, 2017
9	8.6%	June 8, 2017
10	9.4%	June 9, 2017
11	9.2%	June 12, 2017
12	8.4%	June 13, 2017
13	7.8%	June 14, 2017
14	8.3%	June 15, 2017
15	8.4%	June 16, 2017
16	8.7%	June 19, 2017
17	8.9%	June 20, 2017
18	8.9%	June 21, 2017
19	9.5%	June 22, 2017
20	9.3%	June 23, 2017
21	8.7%	June 26, 2017
22	8.6%	June 27, 2017
23	7.9%	June 28, 2017
24	8.9%	June 29, 2017
25	7.8%	June 30, 2017
26	8.1%	July 3, 2017
27	8.4%	July 4, 2017
28	9.2%	July 5, 2017
29	8.2%	July 6, 2017
30	8.5%	July 7, 2017
31	8%	July 10, 2017
32	7.8%	July 11, 2017
33	8.2%	July 12, 2017
34	8.2%	July 13, 2017
35	7.7%	July 14, 2017
36	8.6%	July 17, 2017
37	8.5%	July 18, 2017
38	8.4%	July 19, 2017
39	8.5%	July 20, 2017
40	8.4%	July 21, 2017
41	8.7%	July 24, 2017
42	9.4%	July 25, 2017
43	9.4%	July 26, 2017
44	9.7%	July 27, 2017
45	9.9%	July 28, 2017
46	9.2%	July 31, 2017
47	9.3%	August 1, 2017
48	9.0%	August 2, 2017
49	9.2%	August 3, 2017
50	9.1%	August 4, 2017
51	8.9%	August 7, 2017
52	9.4%	August 8, 2017
53	8.8%	August 9, 2017
54	8.0%	August 10, 2017
55	8.8%	August 11, 2017

== Development ==
My Love from the Star is a South Korean television drama series broadcast by Seoul Broadcasting System. Written by Park Ji-eun and directed by Jang Tae-yoo, the series starred Kim Soo-hyun and Jun Ji-hyun. The television series was broadcast in the Philippines through GMA Network.

On March 24, 2016, GMA Network announced that they have acquired the rights to remake the South Korean television series. On April 19, 2016, Joyce E. Bernal said she would direct the television series. Principal photography commenced on December 12, 2016.

=== Casting ===
On April 19, 2016, Alden Richards would play the role of Matteo, originally played by actor Kim Soo-hyun. On July 4, 2016, Jennylyn Mercado was hired to play the role of Steffi, originally played by Jun Ji-hyun. Richards was later announced not to appear in the series. On December 9, 2016, after conducting multiple auditions for the role of Matteo, Gil Cuerva was hired. The role of Doris was first offered to Alice Dixson which she turned down for personal reasons. On July 6, 2017, Spanky Manikan was replaced by Crispin Pineda for health reasons.

== Accolades ==
Accolades received by My Love from the Star
Year	Award	Category	Recipient	Result	Ref.
2017	31st PMPC Star Awards for Television	Best New Male TV Personality	Gil Cuerva	Nominated	
