= Pauline Mendoza =

Filipino actress

- Born: Pauline Bianca Cruz Esquieres; October 5, 1999 (age 27); Lucban, Quezon, Philippines
- Other names: Pauline; Pau
- Occupation: Actress
- Years active: 2014–present

Pauline Bianca Cruz Esquieres (born October 5, 1999), known professionally as Pauline Mendoza (Tagalog: [paʊˈlin mɛnˈdɔsɐ]), is a Filipino actress. She is also known for her various roles in Little Nanay (2015), That's My Amboy (2016), My Love from the Star (2017), and Kambal, Karibal (2017–2018) as Crisel, her biggest break to date. She was seen in Babawiin Ko ang Lahat (2021) as her first leading role in television.

== Early life and education ==
Pauline Mendoza was born as Pauline Bianca Cruz Esquieres on October 5, 1999. She is currently taking up Bachelor of Science Major in Interior Design at De La Salle–College of Saint Benilde.

== Career ==
=== 2014–2016: Career beginnings and breakthrough ===
She began her career in 2015 where she appeared as 'Macy in Little Nanay. She has then appeared in That's My Amboy and Juan Happy Love Story in 2016, and Alyas Robin Hood.

=== 2017–present: Breakthrough ===
In 2017, she got her role as Marcela in My Love from the Star. After that, she had been appearing as guest casts and given minor roles. She got her biggest break in the hit primetime series Kambal, Karibal, where in she was cast as Criselda "Crisel" Magpantay, the bitter-sweet twin sister of Crisanta "Crisan" Magpantay, portrayed by her co-star Bianca Umali in the titular roles. She had received various positive recognitions because of her portrayal of the character along with then newly signed Kapuso artist Kyline Alcantara, who was also part of the main cast in the series. Since then, she has appeared in various anthologies such as Magpakailanman and Dear Uge, and on the prime time series Cain at Abel as Patricia "Pat" Tolentino and Love You Two (2019) as Zora. She then played leading roles in Babawiin Ko Ang Lahat (2021) as Iris Allegre-Salvador and Widow's Web (2022) as Elaine Innocencio-Querubin.

== Personal life ==
From 2020 to 2023, Mendoza was in a relationship with Alaminos mayor Bryan Celeste.

== Filmography ==
=== Television ===
Year	Title	Role
2015	Little Nanay	Macy
2016	That's My Amboy	Maria Carmela "Maricar" Carreon-Tapang
2016	Juan Happy Love Story	Teen Happy Villanueva
2016–2017	Alyas Robin Hood	Betchay
2017	My Love from the Star	Marcella Infante / Teen Steffi
2017–2018	Kambal, Karibal	Criselda "Crisel" Enriquez Magpantay
2018–2019	Cain at Abel	Patricia "Pat" Tolentino
2019	Love You Two	Zora
2019	One of the Baes	Kimmy Santisimo
2021	Babawiin Ko ang Lahat	Iris Salvador
2022	Widows' Web	Elaine Innocencio
2023	Maria Clara at Ibarra	Juliana "Juli" de Dios
2023	Abot-Kamay na Pangarap	Katelyn Salazar
2024	Makiling	Bianca Mallari
2025	Prinsesa ng City Jail	Mimi Sanchez

=== Drama anthologies ===
Year	Title	Role
2016	Magpakailanman: Tiyahin Ko, Karibal Ko	Teen Nina
2016	Magpakailanman: Ang Lihim Ni Rovie	Teen Rovie
2016	Magpakailanman: Nang Mawala Ang Lahat	Young Queenie
2016	Magpakailanman: Ang Babae Sa Bus	Young Maricris
2016	Karelasyon: Bilin	Leni
2017	Dear Uge: Aso't Pusa	Cherry
2017	Dear Uge: Saklolo, Saklola	Christina
2018	Wagas: Ang Pilat Ni Galea	Galea
2018	Magpakailanman: Our Crazy Love	Issa
2018	Tadhana: Hinog Sa Pilit	Michelle
2018	Magpakailanman: Sa Kamay Ng Sarili Kong Ama	Yukie
2019	Tadhana: Bangkay	Missy
2019	Dear Uge: Saklolo, Saklola	Pipay
2019	Magpakailanman: Mamili Ka, Ako O Anak Ko?	Lucila
2019	Daig Kayo Ng Lola Ko: Love From Beyond	Marge
2019	Dear Uge: Finding Ninong/Money Po Ninang!	Shiela Mae
2020	Magpakailanman: The Abandoned Sisters	Madel
2021	Dear Uge: What's My Name	Pinakbet Cruz
2021	My Fantastic Pag-ibig: Sakalam	Sophie
2023	Tadhana: Pagtatapos	Helen Regalado
2024	Tadhana: Pamilya	Celine Javier

== Awards and nominations ==
Awards and nominations received by Pauline Mendoza
Award	Year (Note: Indicates the year of ceremony)	Category	Nominated work	Result	Ref.
PMPC Star Awards for Television	2018	Best Drama Supporting Actress	Kambal, Karibal	Nominated	
