= Dave Bornea =

Philippine actor (born 1995)

- Born: Justin Merck de Jesus; February 23, 1995 (age 31); Talisay, Cebu, Philippines
- Other names: Dave, Chat
- Occupations: Actor; model; dancer
- Years active: 2015–present
- Agent: Sparkle GMA Artist Center (2015–present)
- Height: 1.73 m (5 ft 8 in)

Justin Merck de Jesus (born February 23, 1995), known professionally as Dave Bornea, is a Filipino YouTube personality, actor, model and dancer best known for his viral video Dubsmash "Twerk It Like Miley".

== Biography ==
He was born in Visayas and raised on February 23, 1995, in Talisay City, Cebu and studied at University of Cebu, later the video "Twerk It Like Miley" was viral the video in social media.

He also auditioned in GMA's hit reality show StarStruck on 6th season. Dave was one of the Top 18 Survivors, along with Nikki Co, Beatriz Imperial and Camille Torres.

After joining StarStruck, he bagged supporting roles in various shows in the network, notably as Julian "Jek Jek" Balbuena in Alyas Robin Hood. He is also part of boy band One Up.

== Filmography ==
=== Television ===
Year	Title	Role	Source
2025	Mga Batang Riles	Angelo "Ssob" Manalo	
2024	Shining Inheritance	Archie	
2024	Black Rider	Pato	
2023	Mga Lihim ni Urduja	Sanchez	
2023	Wish Ko Lang: Marites	Buboy	
2022	Apoy sa Langit	Anthony "Tony" Zulueta	
2022	Widows' Web	Dwight de Guzman	
2021	Babawiin Ko ang Lahat	Randall Madrigal	
2019	Imbestigador: Marilog Massacre	Jerum Ponce	
2019	Sahaya	Inda	
2018	Daig Kayo ng Lola Ko: Nonoy, Ang Santang Pinoy	Paul	
2018	Victor Magtanggol	Iking	
2018	Kambal, Karibal	Claudio Calderon	
2018	Inday Will Always Love You	Eulogist	
2018	Wagas: Mahal Ko, Kakambal ng Engkanto	Bryan Navela	
2018	The One That Got Away	Andrew	
2018	Tadhana: Nanay Knows Best	Jojo	
2018-2019	Dear Uge	Diego	
2017	Dear Uge: Manang and Me	Miggy	
2017	Magpakailanman: Go, Save My Daughter	young Rommel	
2017	Dear Uge: Anak ni Ex	Sherwin Kinayod	
2017	Magpakailanman: My Breastfeeding Dad (The Anton Ramos Story)	Jayjay	
2017	Meant to Be	Andrew Zapata	
2016-2017	Alyas Robin Hood	Julian Balbuena	
2016	Magpakailanman: Nang Mawala ang Lahat	Dennis	
2016	That's My Amboy	Red Team Star Player	
