= That's My Amboy =

2016 Philippine television drama series

- Title card
- Also known as: My Superstar
- Genre: Drama; Romantic comedy
- Created by: Rodney Junio; Rhoda Mariño
- Written by: Denoy Navarro-Punio; Rhoda Mariño; Renei Patricia Dimla; Anna Levita Macapugay
- Directed by: Dominic Zapata; Joyce Bernal; Irene Emma Villamor
- Creative director: Roy Iglesias
- Starring: Barbie Forteza; Andre Paras
- Opening theme: "Umaasa Pa Rin Ako" by The Mike Bon Gang
- Ending theme: "Perfect Together" by Julie Anne San Jose
- Country of origin: Philippines
- Original language: Tagalog
- No. of episodes: 68 (list of episodes)

Production
- Executive producer: Lani Feliciano-Sandoval
- Production locations: Quezon City, Philippines
- Cinematography: Joe Tutanes
- Editors: Robert Ryan Reyes; Noel S. Mauricio II
- Camera setup: Multiple-camera setup
- Running time: 25–45 minutes
- Production company: GMA Entertainment TV

Original release
- Network: GMA Network
- Release: January 25 – April 29, 2016

That's My Amboy (international title: My Superstar) is a 2016 Philippine television drama romance comedy series broadcast by GMA Network. Directed by Dominic Zapata and Joyce E. Bernal, it stars Barbie Forteza and Andre Paras in the title role. It premiered on January 25, 2016 on the network's Telebabad line up. The series concluded on April 29, 2016, with a total of 68 episodes.

The series is streaming online on YouTube.

== Premise ==
Bryan, an actor is the reason why Maru's stepfather got into an accident. To pay for the damages, Bryan's manager hires Maru to be Bryan's personal assistant. The two don't get along at first but eventually they will become friends and fall for each other.

== Cast and characters ==
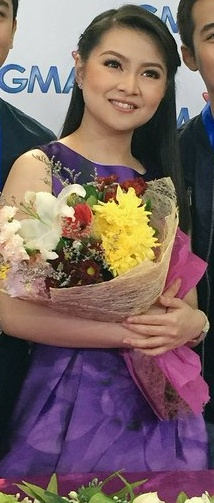
Barbie Forteza portrays Maru Carreon Tapang.

Lead cast

- Barbie Forteza as Maria Rosario "Maru" Carreon Tapang / Romero
- Andre Paras as Bryan Ford

Supporting cast

- Tonton Gutierrez as Albert Romero
- John Arcilla as Joselito "Lito" Tapang
- Donita Rose as Cecille Carreon-Tapang
- Kiko Estrada as Patrick "Kitoy" Almeda
- Jazz Ocampo as Trina Dominguez
- Matet de Leon as Yaya Yolly
- Meryll Soriano as Divine "Ms. D"
- Maritoni Fernandez as Alicia Ford
- Pauline Mendoza as Maria Carmela "Maricar" Carreon Tapang
- Kryshee Grengia as Maria Theresa "Mayte" Carreon Tapang
- Pam Prinster as Miley Vergara
- Philip Lazaro as PR

Guest cast

- Jaclyn Jose as Mrs. Ventura
- Alden Richards as himself
- Rhian Ramos as herself
- Gina Alajar as herself
- Tina Paner as Kelly
- Thea Tolentino as Lynette
- Regine Tolentino as a host
- Lovely Rivero as herself
- Debraliz as Linda
- Carmen Soriano as Stella
- Princess Guevarra as Celine
- Mega Unciano as Diego
- Janna Dominguez as Christine
- Orosa Jacinto as Julianna "Jill" Ford
- Diva Montelaba as Rebecca "Becky" Almeda
- Rez Cortez as Jun
- Renz Valerio as Marky
- Cheska Diaz as Lolita Carreon
- Mayton Eugenio as Melissa "Isa" Carreon
- Carmi Martin as Maria Gregoria "Marissa" Tapang-Santos
- Manny Castañeda as Direk

== Ratings ==
That's My Amboy ratings
Episode	Original air date	AGB Nielsen Mega Manila Households Television Homes			Ref.
Episode	Original air date	Rating	Timeslot rank	Primetime rank	Ref.
1	January 25, 2016	21.5%	#2	#5	
2	January 26, 2016	22.2%	#2	#4	
3	January 27, 2016	17.9%	#2	#4	
4	January 28, 2016	21.7%	#2	#5	
5	January 29, 2016	17.3%	#2	#7	
6	February 1, 2016	21.2%	#2	#4	
7	February 2, 2016	21.9%	#2	#5	
8	February 3, 2016	16.9%	#2	#5	
9	February 4, 2016	20.4%	#2	#5	
10	February 5, 2016	21.5%	#2	#4	
11	February 8, 2016	19.7%	#2	#5	
12	February 9, 2016	20.5%	#2	#6	
13	February 10, 2016	17.7%	#2	#5	
14	February 11, 2016	19.9%	#2	#5	
15	February 12, 2016	18.3%	#2	#6	
16	February 15, 2016	19.6%	#2	#5	
17	February 16, 2016	20.7%	#2	#5	
18	February 17, 2016	20.0%	#1	#4	
19	February 18, 2016	21.8%	#2	#4	
20	February 19, 2016	21.2%	#1	#4	
21	February 22, 2016	19.4%	#2	#4	
22	February 23, 2016	18.9%	#2	#5	
23	February 24, 2016	20.2%	#2	#5	
24	February 25, 2016	19.5%	#2	#5	
25	February 26, 2016	19.0%	#2	#4	
26	February 29, 2016	20.9%	#2	#5	
27	March 1, 2016	19.1%	#2	#5	
28	March 2, 2016	19.2%	#2	#5	
29	March 3, 2016	20.9%	#2	#5	
30	March 4, 2016	21.0%	#1	#4	
31	March 7, 2016	20.2%	#2	#5	
32	March 8, 2016	21.2%	#2	#5	
33	March 9, 2016	19.5%	#2	#6	
34	March 10, 2016	21.9%	#1	#4	
35	March 11, 2016	20.1%	#2	#5	
36	March 14, 2016	23.1%	#1	#4	
37	March 15, 2016	23.1%	#1	#4	
38	March 16, 2016	20.7%	#2	#5	
39	March 17, 2016	22.7%	#1	#4	
40	March 18, 2016	21.6%	#1	#3	
41	March 21, 2016	20.7%	#2	#5	
42	March 22, 2016	22.5%	#1	#3	
43	March 23, 2016	22.8%	#1	#3	
44	March 28, 2016	19.0%	#1	#4	
45	March 29, 2016	18.6%	#2	#5	
46	March 30, 2016	18.0%	#1	#4	
47	March 31, 2016	19.6%	#1	#4	
48	April 1, 2016	18.6%	#1	#5	
49	April 4, 2016	19.9%	#1	#4	
50	April 5, 2016	19.2%	#2	#4	
51	April 6, 2016	20.4%	#2	#5	
52	April 7, 2016	20.6%	#1	#4	
53	April 8, 2016	19.3%	#1	#4	
54	April 11, 2016	18.5%	#2	#5	
55	April 12, 2016	20.0%	#2	#5	
56	April 13, 2016	19.0%	#1	#4	
57	April 14, 2016	21.1%	#1	#4	
58	April 15, 2016	17.7%	#2	#6	
59	April 18, 2016	17.6%	#1	#4	
60	April 19, 2016	17.9%	#1	#4	
61	April 20, 2016	17.0%	#1	#4	
62	April 21, 2016	18.1%	#1	#4	
63	April 22, 2016	18.6%	#1	#4	
64	April 25, 2016	17.6%	#2	#5	
65	April 26, 2016	17.7%	#1	#4	
66	April 27, 2016	18.7%	#1	#4	
67	April 28, 2016	19.7%	#1	#3	
68	April 29, 2016	20.5%	#1	#2	

== Production ==
Principal photography commenced on January 11, 2016.
