= Arra San Agustin =

Filipina actress (born 1995)

- Born: Arra Krisette San Agustin; April 25, 1995 (age 31); Calapan, Oriental Mindoro, Philippines
- Occupations: Actress; host; model; singer
- Years active: 2004, 2015–present
- Agent: Sparkle GMA Artist Center (2015–present)
- Known for: Carol, Audrey, Bella, and Joan
- Height: 1.63 m (5 ft 4 in)
- Parent: Yssa San Agustin (mother)

Arra Krisette San Agustin (born April 25, 1995) is a Filipino actress, host, model, and singer.

She was one of the top 6 finalists of the sixth season of StarStruck, a reality-based talent search show of GMA Network. She was a mainstay of the longest-running sketch comedy program on Philippine television, Bubble Gang, until May 2022. She was tagged as "the newest gem of drama" in 2019.

== Biography ==
=== 2015–2017: Stint in Starstruck VI, Career Beginnings and Encantadia ===
During her StarStruck stint in 2015, San Agustin was studying psychology at De La Salle University and graduated a year later.

Thereafter, she landed roles in several shows such as Maynila, Magpakailanman, Karelasyon, Dear Uge, and Usapang Real Love Presents: Perfect Fit. She joined the cast of GMA's longest running gag show, Bubble Gang in 2016.

After a short appearance as Mia in Meant to Be, San Agustin was given the role of Ariana, the "sarkosi" or reincarnation of Amihan in the 2016 fantasy series, Encantadia.

=== 2018: Supporting roles and hosting stint ===
In 2018, she played Anna Lazaro in the sci-fi action series, The Cure opposite Ken Chan and after the show ended, she was once again paired with Ken in the drama, My Special Tatay as his childhood best friend and love interest, Carol Flores.

Starting 2019, San Agustin hosted Taste MNL, a GMA online show where she visits restaurants in the metro.

=== 2019–present: Transition to lead roles ===
In 2019, San Agustin got her first lead role as Audrey Segundo in the drama Madrasta together with Juancho Trivino.

In 2022, San Agustin got another lead role as Bella Melendez in the adventure series Lolong together with Ruru Madrid.

In late 2023, San Agustin starred as Joan Uy in the action thriller series Black Rider together with Matteo Guidicelli.

In 2024, San Agustin starred as Esther Valencia in Lilet Matias: Attorney-at-Law.

== Personal life ==
She was born in Oriental Mindoro, and raised in Cavite. She has always been into singing and music. San Agustin was quoted, "I am a Christ believer and I'm very proud of it." She first entered into a relationship with basketball player, Thomas Torres. After her relationship with Torres, she then became involved in a relationship with another basketball player, Juami Tiongson.

== Discography ==
=== Singles ===
Year	Title	Album	Label
2019	Hayaan Mo	Madrasta Soundtrack	GMA Music
2021	Walang Makakapigil	The Lost Recipe OST	GMA Music
2022	Hanggang Dito Na Lang	Newest Debut Single	GMA Playlist
2025	Balang Araw	Newest Debut Single	GMA Playlist

== Filmography ==
=== Television / Digital series ===
Year	Title	Role
2016	A1 Ko Sa 'Yo	Patty
2017	Meant to Be	Emilia "Mia" Lardizabal
2017	Encantadia	Ariana (Sarkosi ni Amihan)
2017	Kambal, Karibal	Young Geraldine
2018	The Cure	Anna Mercado-Lazaro
2018–2019	My Special Tatay	Carolina "Carol" Flores
2019–2020	Madrasta	Audrey Segundo-Ledesma / Rachel Cruz
2021	The Lost Recipe	Dulce
2021	I Can See You: On My Way to You	Samantha "Tammy" Razon
2022	Lolong	Isabella "Bella" Melendez
2022–2023	Happy Together	Shelly
2023	Mga Lihim ni Urduja	Valencia Nadales
2023	Abot-Kamay na Pangarap	Emily
2023–2024	Black Rider	Joan Uy
2024	Lilet Matias: Attorney-at-Law	Estar Valencia
2025	My Ilonggo Girl	Sugar Hermoso
2025	Beauty Empire	Grace Biglangawa

=== Television programs ===
Year	Title	Role
2004	Jr. News	Herself / Junior Anchor
2015	StarStruck VI	Herself/Contestant
2016–2022	Bubble Gang	Herself / Regular cast member
2016	Pepito Manaloto: Ang Tunay na Kwento	Jackie
2016	Karelasyon: Poser	Dana / Bianca
2016	Magpakailanman: Pikot in Love	Daisy
2016	Maynila: Unrequited Love	Girlie
2016	Laff, Camera, Action!	Trophy Girl
2016	Dear Uge: Si Badong at Si Bading	Esang
2016	Usapang Real Love Presents: Perfect Fit	Meg
2016	Maynila: My Beki Dad	Lyanna
2016	Dear Uge: Till Death Do Us Part	Kristen
2017	Karelasyon: Suitor	Kleng
2017	Maynila: Struggle is Real	Andrea
2017	All Star Videoke	Herself / Contestant
2017	Road Trip: Burias Island	Herself / Guest
2017	Daig Kayo ng Lola Ko: Ang Pulubi at Ang Prinsipe	Sandra
2017	Wish Ko Lang: Padyak	Alice
2017	Maynila: Young Love, Sweet Love	Mary Lagasca
2017	Magpakailanman: Christmas Lullaby	Eleonor
2018	Daig Kayo ng Lola Ko: Oh My Genie	Z
2018	Wish Ko Lang: Balat	Michelle
2018	Dear Uge: Si Throwback o Si Future	Frida
2018	Studio 7	Herself / Guest
2018	Magpakailanman: Takbo ng Buhay Ko	Trisha
2018–2021	Taste Buddies	Herself / Segment host
2021	My Fantastic Pag-Ibig: Trophy Girl	Mariquit / Marikit
2022	Tadhana: Babawiin Ko ang Langit	Emilia/Amber Venganza
2022	Family Feud	Herself / Guest
2022	Imbestigador: The Jovelyn Galleno Murder Case	Jovelyn Galleno
2023–2024	Eat Bulaga!	Herself / Host
2024	Tahanang Pinakamasaya!	Herself / Host
