= Jan Manual =

Filipino actor and comedian (born 1986)

- Born: Janhilly Manual; January 13, 1986 (age 40); Manila, Philippines
- Other name: Pacboy
- Occupations: Actor; host; comedian
- Years active: 2006–2018
- Agent: GMA Artist Center (until 2018)
- Known for: Starstruck; Bubble Gang
- Spouse: Jamey Santiago (m. 2018)
- Children: 2

Janhilly "Jan" Manual (born January 13, 1986) is a Filipino actor and comedian. He made his first showbiz appearance on the fourth season of the Philippine reality show StarStruck where he finished as an avenger. He was a contract artist of GMA Artist Center. He is also the nephew of Survivor Philippines Season 1 Castaway Rob Sy.

Manual is known for being a mainstay in longest-running gag show Bubble Gang.

== Biography ==
=== 2006—2007: StarStruck ===
On September 3, 2006, GMA Network formally announced the return of their reality-based talent show now titled StarStruck: The Next Level (aka StarStruck 4), a new and improved edition of the popular show. Hosted by the same hosts and headed by The Council members' Lorna Tolentino, Louie Ignacio and Douglas Quijano, the show had its pilot episode on December 4, 2006.

In the 4th year of the reality-talent search, the age bracket for star wannabes was adjusted from 15 to 18 in previous batches to 16–21, a milestone in StarStruck History.

Unlike the previous batches which launched 14, this batch were trimmed down to twenty, dubbed as the "Top 20". Also, four winners were picked in this season — Ultimate Sweetheart, Ultimate Hunk, and Ultimate Loveteam.

Just like in previous seasons, voting is via the internet and mobile phones and this constitutes 50% of the total scores of the survivors.

Jan made it through to the Top 14 but was eliminated. At the Final Judgment, he received an award for Dats Entertaining Award along with Dex Quindoza for Male with the Most Dramatic Exit, Stef Prescott for Female With the Most Dramatic Exit, and Jesi Corcuera for the Best Taktak Award.

=== 2007—2018: Post—StarStruck ===
He is presently making his own mark and signature in the Philippine show business through his role as Pacboy, the comic imitation of Manny Pacquiao in his segment in Startalk. He is joined with his fellow StarStruck alumni Chariz Solomon with StarStruck V's graduates Nina Kodaka and Princess Snell. Jan also voiced the character Chad from Bleach anime.

Jan had some offerings which were sexy roles but he refused because he thought that he was too sexy to be in it, "sexy of fats".

While celebrating the KapusOlympics Watermania 2008 in Golden Sunset Resort, the torch accidentally fell onto Jan's face and to some part of his body. He stayed in hospital for three weeks and couldn't do anything but to rest while fighting for his life thinking that it was his end. After three weeks of medication, Jan back to work and there were no marks that made by the accident. That experience for him is considered as a miracle.

Jan was included in I Laugh Sabado. that served as his biggest break as he was one of the main hosts. According to him in an interview, he said he could be free from the shadows of his character in Startalk who is "Pacboy". He joined the casts of Wally Bayola, Paolo Paraiso, Janna Dominguez, Gee Canlas, Alfred Marquez and Archie Alemania. I Laugh Sabado was directed by Bibeth Orteza. In the said show, he also said that he was able to show his other abilities as a comedian.

Aside from his stint in I Laugh Sabado, he was seen more often in some shows of GMA as an extended cast such as The Last Prince and in Panday Kids. Jan appeared in Take Me Out, a TV dating game show hosted by Jay-R. Being a comedian, Jan also served as guest in Bubble Gang where he admitted he wanted to be part of the country's best gag show.

In 2011, Jan was cast in the country's first epic-serye and the most expensive project GMA has done yet before Indio — Amaya starred by Marian Rivera and Sid Lucero.

In 2012, Jan was part of the early prime time show, My Daddy Dearest as Jing.

In 2013, Jan was expected to be part of a new series to be led by his StarStruck batch-mates, Aljur Abrenica and Kris Bernal. The title of the series was Prinsesa ng Buhay Ko. Aside from his then upcoming prime time series, in July 2013, Bubble Gang revealed that Manual is part of the show's search for a new batch of comedians. Their search is called "Bagong Gang The Search for New Recruits". However, Manual shared that he might eliminate himself in Bubble Gang because of the possible schedule conflict with his Prinsesa ng Buhay Ko role, although he said that nothing was definite yet as of that moment. In the end, Jan was able to finish his soap and at the same time, winning the competition in the gag show.

In mid-2013, Jan appeared in Wagas, a romance drama anthology aired in GMA News TV with Frank Magalona and Kylie Padilla, and in Pepito Manaloto as Lawrence. Jan also portrayed the role of Charice Pempengco's manager in Charice's life story in Magpakailanman.

In early 2014, Jan had his first movie project via Basement. He portrayed the character of Migs, the nurse of Pilita Corrales' character. The said film was released on February 12, 2013, making it as the Valentine movie offering of GMA Films. By the end the first quarter of 2014, Jan had his first starring role via the Lenten season offering of The 700 Club Asia's Tanikala, My Sister, My Lover. He starred opposite Sheena Halili, another StarStruck alumna. Jan played the character of Art Duyan, a gay before who got married and eventually getting a family. Art is now a pastor. Jan is a no stranger to gay roles as he played several gay roles before. According to him, his role in My Sister, My Lover is special to him because the show has a different purpose which is not just to entertain. He also said that he accepted the role because he knows that that show would do something good and there would be a lot of viewers who would be able to relate to the story. According to CBN Asia's website, Tanikala (Shackles) is their annual TV drama special that airs nationwide in the Philippines every Holy Week. It "features true-to-life stories of Filipinos who fought their way out of the darkness of their lives, and found the light of the truth in Jesus". After months of not having an acting project aside from his Bubble Gang stint, Jan becomes part of the weekly drama anthology, Seasons of Love, where he is in the second installment entitled "I Do, I Don't" which starred by Louise delos Reyes, Geoff Eigenmann and Mike Tan. His character's name is Badoy, the best friend of Mike Tan's character, Gary.

== Personal life ==
Jan has stated that he wants to concentrate on comedy. He said that Michael V. and Jim Carrey are his idols when it comes to make people laugh. He has plans in relocating to the United States if his showbiz career does not work out. Though Jan is most interested in comedy roles, he still hopes to do drama series as well.

He enjoys working out through Taekwondo and boxing.

Jan married Jamey Santiago in June 2018. They met due to attending the same church. Santiago is one of the hosts of Christian TV show 700 Club Asia.

== Filmography ==
=== Film ===
Year	Title	Role
2014	Basement	Migs

=== Television ===
Year	Title	Role
2020	Eat Bulaga!	Himself/Guest
2018	Kapag Nahati ang Puso	Miggy
2017	Road Trip	Himself/Guest
2016	That's My Amboy	Simon
2015	Sabado Badoo	Himself/Guest(s) Footage
2015	Kailan Ba Tama ang Mali?	Earl
2014	Seasons of Love: I Do, I Don't	Badoy
2014	Tanikala: My Sister, My Lover	Art Duyan
2013–2018	Bubble Gang	Various roles
2007–2015	Startalk	Himself/Segment Host
2013	Prinsesa ng Buhay Ko	Phil
2013	Pepito Manaloto: Ang Tunay na Kuwento	Lawrence
2013	Magpakailanman: The Charice Pempengco Story	Glenn
2013	Wagas: Ang Siga at ang Promdi	Buboy
2012	My Daddy Dearest	Jing
2011	Spooky Nights: Snow White Lady and the 7 Ghosts	Sleepy Ghost
2011	Amaya	Usbog
2011	Maynila: Best friend and a Girl	JP
2011	Alakdana	Vic
2010	I Laugh Sabado	Various roles
2010	The Last Prince	Harold
2010	Panday Kids	Hamogo
2009	StarStruck: The Strike back	Himself
2009	SRO Cinemaserye: The Eva Castillo Story	Danny
2008	Gagambino	Eldon
2008	Bleach: Season 2	Yasutora Sado
2007	Boys Nxt Door	Raffy
2007	Daisy Siete Season 16: Tabachingching	Winston
2007	Mga Kuwento ni Lola Basyang: Ang Plautin ni Periking	
2007	Mga Kuwento ni Lola Basyang: Ang Palasyo ng mga Duwende	Antok
2007	Pati Ba Pintig ng Puso	young Don Griego
2006	StarStruck: The Next Level	Himself/Finalist

== See also ==
- Sheena Halili
- Kevin Santos (actor)
- Arci Muñoz
- Kim Domingo
- Sef Cadayona
