= Maey Bautista =

Filipino journalist, actress and comedian

- Born: Maylin Bautista; May 5, 1973 (age 53); Philippines
- Other name: Maey B.
- Occupations: Journalist; host; actress; comedian
- Years active: 2008–present
- Agent: Sparkle GMA Artist Center (2008–present)
- Known for: Day Off; May Tamang Balita, AHA!; Survivor Philippines; Good News

Maylin "Maey" Bautista (born May 5, 1973, also known as Maey B, is a Filipino journalist, host, actress, and comedian. She is known for her tandem with Betong Sumaya since they participated in Survivor Philippines: Celebrity Doubles Showdown.

Bautista is also known for hosting several GMA Public Affairs programs including Day Off, May Tamang Balita, AHA!, and Good News.

== Filmography ==
=== Television ===
Year	Title	Role
2026	Kapamilya Deal or No Deal	Herself
2026	Born to Shine	Belen
2025	Prinsesa ng City Jail	Yang
2023	Walang Matigas na Pulis sa Matinik na Misis	Brgy. Kapitana Candida Magtulis
2023	Unbreak My Heart	Elsie
2023	Underage	Remicia "Remi"
2022	Love You Stranger	Apple Escalante
2020	I Can See You: The Promise	Rowena Marquez
2020–2021	Love of My Life	Charmaine "Cha-Mae" Facundo
2019	Hiram na Anak	Jinky "Engke" Magpugay
2018	My Guitar Princess	Dolly
2017	Haplos	Manang Fely
2017	Tadhana	Bess
2017	I Heart Davao	Judith
2017	Destined to be Yours	DJ Mema
2015–2017	Karelasyon	Taxi Passenger / Various roles
2016	Sinungaling Mong Puso	Lady Prisoner
2016	A1 Ko Sa 'Yo	Ms. Sanchez
2016	Wagas: Bulag Ba Ang Pag-Ibig?	Charite
2016	Naku, Boss Ko!	Eya Binabalita
2016	Little Nanay	Rubia
2016	Because of You	Honey
2016–2022	Dear Uge	Emily / Various roles
2015–2016	Juan Tamad	Cindy
2015	Dangwa	Rica
2015	Alamat	Juan's Mother
2014	Sa Puso ni Dok	Miriam
2013	Magpakailanman	Suzette

- plus more shows / guestings in GMA News TV
- the selected list above is incomplete

=== Films ===
Year	Title	Role
2013	Big Sister	Teacher
2012	Slumber Party	
2012	Just One Summer	
2012	Boy Pick-Up	Mayumi
2026	2 Valid IDs	Edna

== See also ==
- Betong Sumaya
- Boobay
- Pekto
