= Naku, Boss Ko! =

2016 Philippine television drama series

- Title card
- Genre: Satire; Political drama
- Created by: Patty Mayor Gutierrez
- Written by: Rodolfo C. Vera; Zig Dulay; Eljay Deldoc
- Directed by: Marlon N. Rivera
- Starring: Ruru Madrid
- Opening theme: "Hay Nako, Boss Ko!" by Betong Sumaya
- Ending theme: "Sa 'Yo Lang ang Puso Ko" by Gabbi Garcia and Ruru Madrid
- Country of origin: Philippines
- Original language: Tagalog
- No. of episodes: 8

Production
- Executive producer: Joseph Conrad P. Rubio
- Production locations: Quezon City, Philippines
- Cinematography: Lee Briones-Meily
- Editors: Genice Panuncio; Jaybe Maquiran; Kris Campanilla; Thea Daguman; Gavian Llave; Tricia Adriano; Erdy Tibayan; Piah Luna; Noli Enero; Vince Peñas
- Camera setup: Multiple-camera setup
- Running time: 26–32 minutes
- Production company: GMA News and Public Affairs

Original release
- Network: GMA Network
- Release: April 25 – May 5, 2016

Naku, Boss Ko! (transl. oh, my boss!) is a 2016 Philippine television drama political series broadcast by GMA Network. Directed by Marlon N. Rivera, it stars Ruru Madrid. It premiered on April 25, 2016 on the network's Telebabad line up. The series concluded on May 5, 2016, with a total of eight episodes.

The series is streaming online on YouTube.

== Premise ==
Jon G, a young and inexperienced mayoral candidate was made to run by his politician father. The drama satirizes and parodies traditional Philippine politics and exposes the absurdity and hypocrisy of some of the campaign strategies used by most politicians today to win voters. It aired for two weeks right before the presidential election on May 9.

== Cast and characters ==
Cast

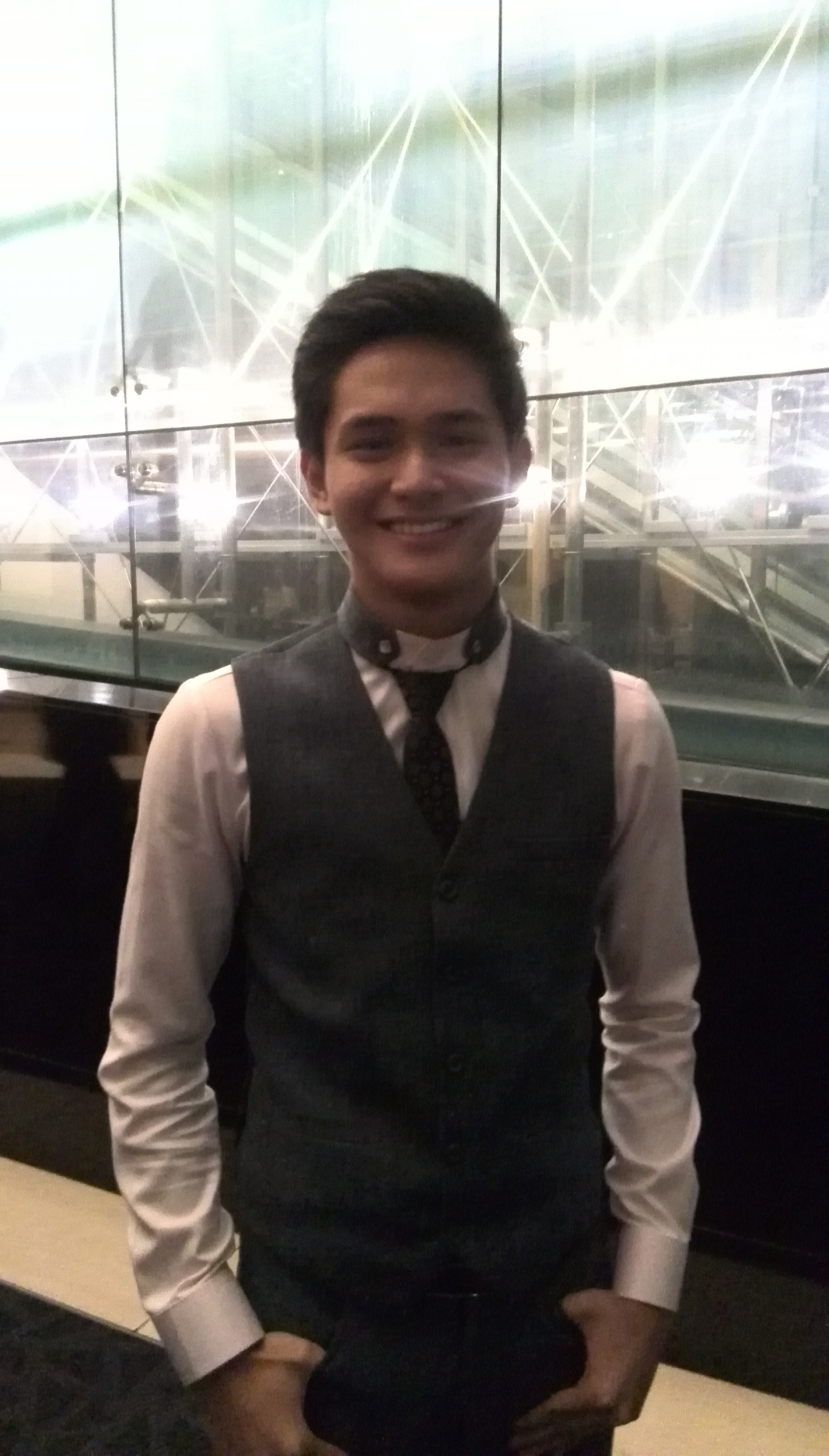
Ruru Madrid

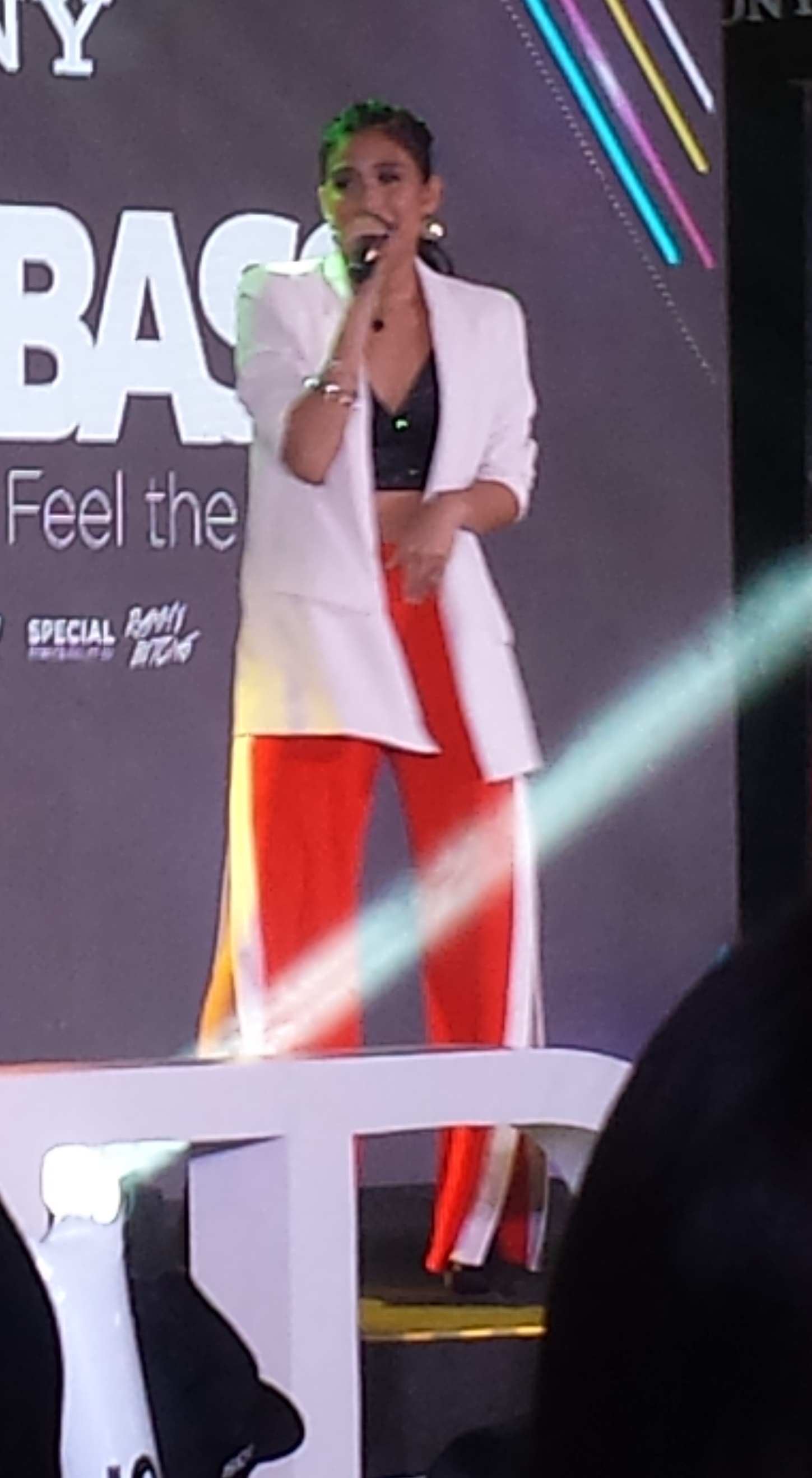
Gabbi Garcia

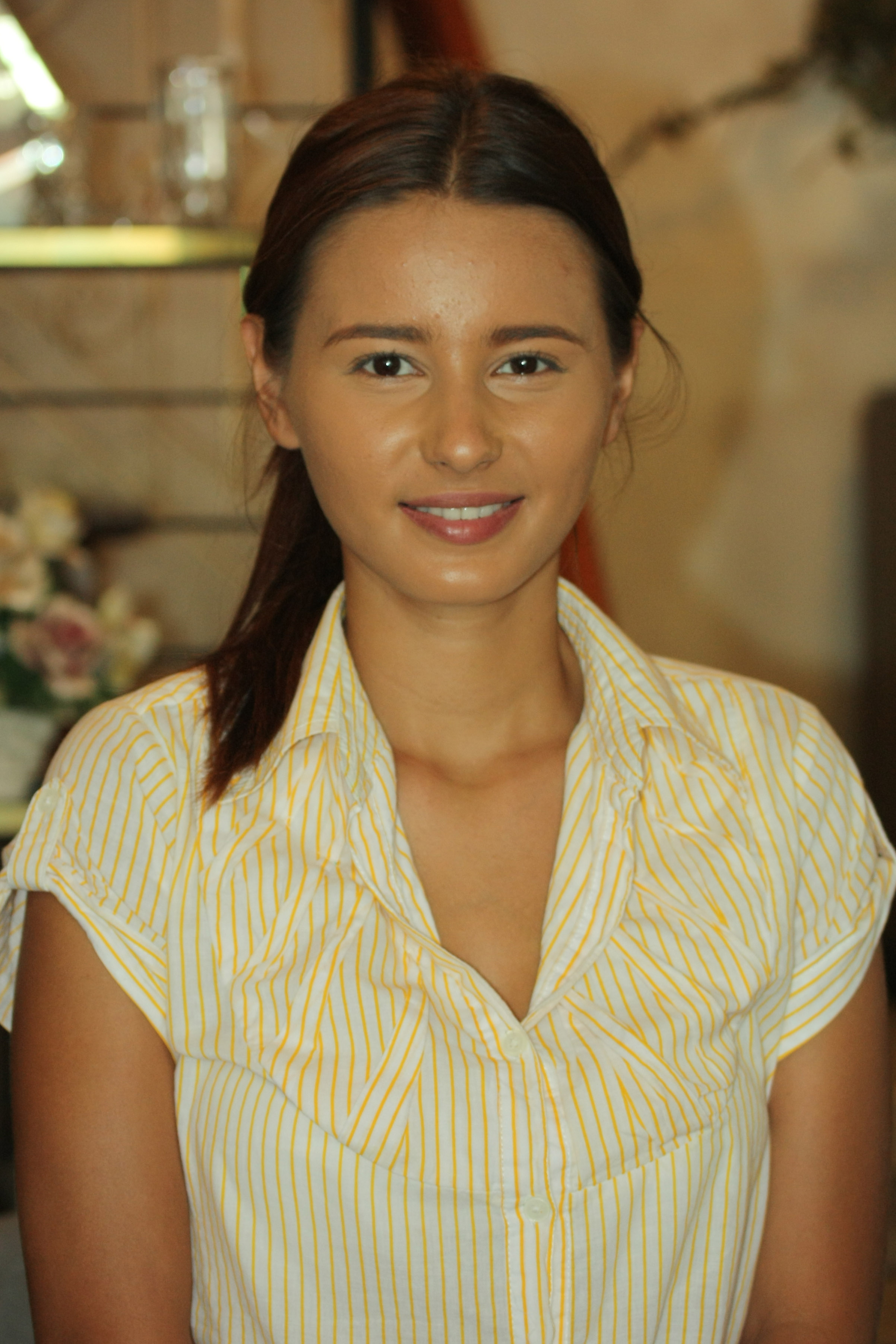
Jackie Rice

Lead cast

- Ruru Madrid as Joven Jon Philip Ganid / Jon G.

Supporting cast

- Tessie Tomas as F
- Leo Martinez as Onofre Mesa Ganid / O.M.G.
- Gabbi Garcia as Cheverlyn "Che" Dimasupil
- Arianne Bautista as Angela Mae "Gelai" Inocente
- Jackie Rice as Margeaux
- Archie Adamos as Achil
- Jao Mapa as Pepe
- Glenda Garcia as Martha Dimasupil
- Love Añover-Lianko as Cora Kamkam
- Vince de Jesus as M
- Patani Daño as Dora Mae
- Pekto as C
- Jay Arcilla as Emil
- Maey Bautista as Eya Binabalita
- Lance Serrano as Rob
- Dang Cruz as a reporter
- Gene Padilla as a reporter

Guest cast

- Divine Aucina as Osang
- Mel Martinez as Hanash
- Martin del Rosario as Carlos Manalastas
- Benjamin Alves as Kenji "Ken G." Ganid
- Jen Rosendahl as Madonna

== Ratings ==
According to AGB Nielsen Philippines' Mega Manila television ratings, the pilot episode of Naku, Boss Ko! earned a 10.9% rating. The final episode scored a 12.9% rating.
