= Sunnyville =

2010 Philippine television infotainment show

- Title card
- Genre: Infotainment
- Directed by: Dante Nico Garcia
- Presented by: Love Añover; Patricia Gayod; Jermaine Ulgasan
- Country of origin: Philippines
- Original language: Tagalog
- No. of episodes: 32

Production
- Executive producer: Sharon Rose Masula
- Camera setup: Multiple-camera setup
- Running time: 30 minutes
- Production company: GMA News and Public Affairs

Original release
- Network: GMA Network
- Release: April 10 – November 13, 2010

Sunnyville is a 2010 Philippine television infotainment children's show broadcast by GMA Network. Hosted by Love Añover, Patricia Gayod and Jermaine Ulgasan, it premiered on April 10, 2010. The show concluded on November 13, 2010, with a total of 32 episodes.

== Hosts ==
- Love Añover as Belle
- Patricia Gayod as Anna
- Jermaine Ulgasan as Buboy
- Joy Viado as Auring

Recurring cast

- Maey Bautista
- Betong Sumaya

== Ratings ==
According to AGB Nielsen Philippines' Mega Manila People/Individual television ratings, the final episode of Sunnyville scored a 1.5% rating.
