= Sef Cadayona =

Filipino actor, comedian, dancer and television host

- Born: John Paul Joseph Cadayona; Las Piñas, Philippines
- Occupations: Actor; dancer; comedian
- Years active: 2009–present
- Agent: GMA Artist Center (2009–present)

John Paul Joseph "Sef" Cadayona is a Filipino actor, comedian and dancer. He gained recognition from an ice cream commercial in the early 2000s and later joined the fifth season of StarStruck (2009), where he reached the Final Fourteen and showcased his dance skills. He went on to appear in several GMA Network programs, including Bubble Gang, Sabado Badoo (2015), and Laff Camera Action (2016), and starred in Pepito Manaloto: Ang Unang Kuwento (2021).

== Life and career ==
John Paul Joseph Cadayona was raised in Las Piñas City. He completed his secondary education at Divine Light Academy and earned a degree in Media Arts, majoring in Broadcasting, from San Beda College Alabang.

=== 2000s: Early television appearances ===
Cadayona made his television debut notable in a commercial for an ice cream brand known for its quirky scenarios involving how to spend a 20-peso bill. Although the advertisement is no longer airing, it gained recognition during its run. In 2009, Cadayona joined the fifth season of the television reality show StarStruck and advanced to the Final Fourteen in November of that year, alongside Steven Silva and Sarah Lahbati, who were ultimately named the Male and Female Ultimate Survivors, respectively.

=== 2010–present: Post StarStruck ===
In 2010, Cadayona appeared in the comedy-musical television series Diva as Marlon Legaspi, the rival of Joey "Pepe Smith" Fernandez, played by Mark Herras, in a dance competition. It was followed by the drama fantasy Ilumina as Renato. In 2011, he appeared in the drama dance Time of My Life as Harry. In the same year, Cadayona guested as a performer in the variety show Party Pilipinas. In 2012, he appeared in the drama fantasy comedy series Alice Bungisngis and Her Wonder Walis as Tomas, followed by the drama comedy romance Together Forever as Jefferson "Jepoy" Teodoro, the drama romance comedy Coffee Prince as Baldo, and the sketch comedy show Bubble Gang as a regular cast member until 2023. In the same year, Cadayona appeared in the film My Kontrabida Girl as Dex, followed by Just One Summer as Jason, Slumber Party as Jonel, Gayak in an unspecified role, and Boy Pick-Up: The Movie as Fish Vendor; for his performance in Gayak, Cadayona received the Breakthrough Performance by an Actor award from the Golden Screen Awards for Movies.

In 2013, Cadayona appeared in the television sitcom series Vampire ang Daddy Ko as Stefano Bulaga / Stefani Ventura, followed by the drama Mundo Mo’y Akin and the science fiction drama Genesis. In 2015, Cadayona hosted the comedy anthology show Sabado Badoo and appeared in the sitcom series Juan Tamad as the title character. In 2016, he hosted the comedy game show Laff, Camera, Action!, followed in 2017 by his appearance in the romantic comedy drama Meant to Be as Bats Mendiola. In 2021, Cadayona starred in the prequel sitcom Pepito Manaloto: Ang Unang Kuwento as the lead and title character Pepito Manaloto.

== Filmography ==
=== Television ===
Year	Title	Role	Notes
2009–2010	StarStruck V	Himself (finalist)	
2010	Diva	Marlon Legaspi	
2010; 2015	Maynila	Sunny	
2010; 2015	Maynila	Nanding	Episode: "Once Princess"
2010; 2015	Maynila	Dave	Episode: "Edi Wow"
2010	I Laugh Sabado	Himself (various roles)	
2010	Ilumina	Renato	
2011	Spooky Nights	Vanessa	Episode: "The Ringtone"
2011	Time of My Life	Harry	
2011–2013	Party Pilipinas	Himself (performer)	
2012	Alice Bungisngis and her Wonder Walis	Tomas / Tom	
2012	Together Forever	Jefferson "Jepoy" Teodoro	
2012	Coffee Prince	Baldo	
2012	Celebrity Bluff	Himself	
2012–2023	Bubble Gang	Himself	
2013–2014	Magpakailanman	teen Wally	Episode: "The Wally Bayola Story"
2013–2014	Magpakailanman	Rolly	Episode: "Habang Buhay Na Maghihintay"
2013–2016	Vampire ang Daddy Ko	Stefano Bulaga / Stefani Ventura	
2013	Mundo Mo'y Akin	Nonoy Pambide	
2013	Genesis	Randy	
2013–2015	Sunday All Stars	Himself (performer)	
2014	Dading	Pato	
2015	Eat Bulaga Lenten Special: Sukli ng Pagmamahal	Budong	
2015	Sabado Badoo	Himself (host)	
2015	My Faithful Husband	Jerome Dela Paz	
2015	Juan Tamad	Juan	
2015	Wagas	Danny	Episode: "Danny & Fredes Love Story"
2016	Dear Uge	Kevin	Episode role
2016	A1 Ko Sa 'Yo	Enzo	
2016	Laff, Camera, Action!	Himself (judge)	
2016–2018	Pepito Manaloto: Ang Tunay na Kuwento	Zsa Zsa	
2017	Meant to Be	Bats Bendiola	
2017	Wish Ko Lang	Leevan	Episode: "Leevan"
2018	Sirkus	Al	
2018	The Stepdaughters	Bryce Morales	
2019	Hiram na Anak	Vince Urbanez	
2021	Game of the Gens	Himself (host)	
2021; 2022–2023	All-Out Sundays	Himself (performer)	
2021–2022	Pepito Manaloto: Ang Unang Kuwento	Pepito Manaloto	
2022	Running Man Philippines	Himself (guest)	
2023	Love Before Sunrise	Bong Pagdilao	
2024	Pulang Araw	Luis	
2024	Forever Young	Kapitan Gerry Peralta	
2025	Pepito Manaloto: Tuloy na Kuwento	Young Pepito Manaloto	

=== Films ===
Year	Title	Role
2010	You to Me Are Everything	Sef
2012	My Kontrabida Girl	Dex
2012	Just One Summer	Jason
2012	Slumber Party	Jonel
2012	Gayak	
2012	Boy Pick-Up: The Movie	Fish Vendor
2013	My Lady Boss	Nonoy
2013	Kaleidoscope World	
2014	My Big Bossing's Adventures	Warda / Wardo

== Awards and nominations ==
Year	Award	Category	Nomination	Result
2013	1st Sunday All Stars Awards	Stand Out Season Performer	None	Nominated
2013	10th Golden Screen Awards for Movies	Breakthrough Performance by an Actor	Gayak	Won
2014	5th Golden Screen Awards for TV	Outstanding Supporting Actor in a Gag or Comedy Show	Bubble Gang	Won
2014	28th Star Awards for TV	Best Comedy Actor	Bubble Gang	Won
2014	40th Metro Manila Film festival	Festival Best Supporting Actor	My Big Bossing's Adventure: Prinsesa	Nominated
2015	6th Golden Screen Television Awards	Outstanding Supporting Actor in a Gag / Comedy Program	Bubble Gang	Won
2015	29th PMPC Star Awards for Television	Best Comedy Actor	Bubble Gang	Nominated
