= May Tamang Balita =

Philippine television news satire show

- Title card
- Genre: News satire
- Written by: Allan Ebora; Rommel Lalata; Marcelo Landicho; Nikki Rivera; Jason Bernard Santos
- Directed by: Jeffrey Mejia
- Presented by: Ramon Bautista; Maey Bautista; Boobay
- Opening theme: "May Tamang Balita" by Tanya Markova
- Country of origin: Philippines
- Original language: Tagalog
- No. of episodes: 100

Production
- Executive producer: Lui Alfaro-Balingit
- Production locations: Studio 2, GMA Network Center, Quezon City, Philippines
- Camera setup: Multiple-camera setup
- Running time: 30–60 minutes
- Production company: GMA News and Public Affairs

Original release
- Network: GMA News TV
- Release: March 4, 2011 – February 7, 2013

May Tamang Balita (transl. there's true news) formally May Tamang Balita atbp. is a Philippine television news satire show broadcast by GMA News TV. Originally hosted by Janna Dominguez, Maey Bautista, Ramon Bautista and Sheena Halili, it premiered on March 4, 2011. The show concluded on February 7, 2013, with a total of 100 episodes.

== Anchors ==
- Ramon Bautista
- Sheena Halili (2011–12)
- Janna Dominguez (2011)
- Jinri Park
- Maey Bautista
- Boobay Balbuena

Recurring anchors

- Tanya Markova
- Albert "Betong" Sumaya as Madame Belle Dama
- Fadir Clahey
- Lloyd Cadena
- Aira Bermudez

Guest anchors

- Ynna Asistio
- Isabel Oli
- Jackie Rice
- Chariz Solomon
- Petra Mahalimuyak
- Ethel Booba
- Frencheska Farr
- Daiana Menezes
