= Seasons of Love (TV program) =

2014 Philippine television drama series

- Title card
- Genre: Romantic drama
- Creative director: Jun Lana
- Opening theme: "Seasons of Love" by Christian Bautista
- Country of origin: Philippines
- Original language: Tagalog
- No. of episodes: 16

Production
- Production locations: Manila, Philippines
- Camera setup: Multiple-camera setup
- Running time: 19–24 minutes
- Production company: GMA Entertainment TV

Original release
- Network: GMA Network
- Release: October 6 – October 30, 2014

Seasons of Love is a 2014 Philippine television drama romance anthology series broadcast by GMA Network. It premiered on October 6, 2014, on the network's Telebabad line up. The series concluded on October 30, 2014, with a total of 16 episodes.

The series is streaming online on YouTube.

== Chapters ==
=== "My Soulmate, My Soulhate" ===
Original air date	October 6 – 9, 2014
Soulmate, Soulhate revolves around two teenagers who switch personalities when a meteor shower occurs. After spending so much time together, the two become fond of each other and eventually fall in love.
Director	Gina Alajar
Cast and characters	Ruru Madrid as Rustico "Rusty" Bayani; Gabbi Garcia as Graciela "Gracia" Jimenez; Elle Ramirez as Emily; Bettina Carlos as Rochelle Jimenez; Eunice Lagusad as Nolyn; Teejay Marquez as Ian

=== "I Do, I Don't" ===
Original air date	October 13 – 16, 2014
Director	Gil Tejada Jr.
Cast and characters	Louise delos Reyes as Melissa; Geoff Eigenmann as Aaron; Mike Tan as Gabby; Shamaine Buencamino as Victoria; Melissa Mendez as Edna; Jan Manual as Badoy; Mayton Eugenio as Kirsten; Coleen Perez as Sinag; Virginia Joshen as Selena; Ronaldo Valdez as Timothy

=== "First Dance, First Love" ===
Original air date	October 20 – 23, 2014
Director	Eric Quizon
Cast and characters	Miguel Tanfelix as Basti Angeles; Bianca Umali as Jasmine Natividad; Gary Estrada as Eduardo Natividad; Chuckie Dreyfus as Nestor Angeles; Sherilyn Reyes as Gloria Natividad; Buboy Villar as Bok; Frances Makil-Ignacio as Mabel; Mel Kimura as teacher Joyce

=== "BF for Hire, GF for Life" ===
Original air date	October 27 – 30, 2014
Location	Albay, Bicol
Cast and characters	Sarah Lahbati as Samantha "Sam" Villareal; Rodjun Cruz as Nono; Ehra Madrigal as Eden; Phytos Ramirez as Julian Abela; Amy Viray as Sara Gomez; Lloyd Samartino as Lulu Villareal; Rommel Quiazon as Loleng Villareal; Aya Medel as Rowena; Lirah Bermudez as Jane; Zandra Summer as Erica

== Ratings ==
According to AGB Nielsen Philippines' Mega Manila household television ratings, the pilot episode of Seasons of Love earned a 16.7% rating. The final episode scored a 14.7% rating.
