= Survivor Philippines: Celebrity Doubles Showdown =

Season of a Philippine television reality show

- Title card
- Presented by: Richard Gutierrez
- No. of days: 36
- No. of castaways: 20 (10 pairs of 2)
- Winner: Albert "Betong" Sumaya, Jr.
- Runners-up: Mara Yokohama; Stef Prescott
- Location: San Vicente, Palawan, Philippines
- No. of episodes: 65 + 1 Reunion Special

Release
- Original release: November 14, 2011 – February 19, 2012

Additional information
- Filming dates: September 21 – October 26, 2011

Season chronology
- ← Previous; Celebrity Showdown

Survivor Philippines: Celebrity Doubles Showdown is the fourth and final season of the Philippine version of the reality television series Survivor.

Richard Gutierrez reprised his hosting stint for the second time after Survivor Philippines: Celebrity Showdown. This installment would feature celebrities contestants grouped as couples with preexisting relationships. Teasers of castaways' identities were partially revealed in the third week of October 2011. A week after the teasers were revealed, the identities of the celebrity castaways were then fully identified.

The show was entirely shot in San Vicente, Palawan, the first time the Philippine franchise has filmed in their home country. The show premiered on GMA Network on November 14, 2011.

Initial tribe names were Bulan ("moon" in Cuyonon and Visayan languages) and Tala (archaic Tagalog term for "star"), termed in-show to be names of goddesses of the moon and stars respectively. In the eventual merge, the new tribe was named Apolaki, after the Tagalog god of the sun and also the god of the warriors. Though the game is a doubles format, it was revealed in the first episode that only one will remain as the Celebrity Sole Survivor who will win ₱3,000,000.

This season is noted to be the one with the most number of quitters, as five separate contestants left the game voluntary during the first six days of the game due to mostly moral reasons. It also has a gender imbalance because there were nine males and eleven females.

The season was won by Albert "Betong" Sumaya Jr. with the vote of 4–2–1, defeating Mara Yokohama and Stef Prescott.

== Twists and changes ==
Aside from its biggest twist, which is the "doubles" concept, this season also featured old and new twists and changes into the game.

- Temptation Reward: The winning tribe in a Reward Challenge would choose one or two of their own to partake in the Temptation Reward. After being shown the reward, the chosen one/s were then also presented with the consequence that comes upon accepting the Temptation Reward. Declining from the Temptation Reward is also an option, if those chosen would deem accepting it be too harmful for their life in the game.
- Tribal Shuffle: Occurring on Cycle 4, this ended the "doubles" format, as the pairs were broken down, with one going to Bulan and the other to Tala.
- Second Reward Challenge in a Cycle: Also used in season 2, this occurred on Cycle 11 when the castaways fought for a car.

== Contestants ==
Contestant	Original tribe	Temptation Switch (Note: Maribel and Mara accepted the Temptation reward, resulting of the two being split up between the two tribes. Mara stayed in Bulan, while Maribel switched to Tala.)	Shuffled tribe (Note: Due to the tribal shuffle, the pairs were broken down, one going to Bulan and the other to Tala, now playing individually as opposed to doubles format.)	Merged tribe	Finish
Geneva Cruz (Note: Geneva and KC initially started as partners. But when Geneva decided to quit the game, the producers of the show gave KC the chance to stay as a solo contestant.); KC's ex-wife/Singer/Actress	Bulan				Quit; Day 2
Alyssa Alano; Aifha's best friend/TV host	Bulan				1st voted out Day 4
Aifha Medina; Alyssa's best friend/Sexbomb Girls member	Bulan				2nd voted out Day 4
Jackie Forster; Angelicopter's friend/Actress	Tala	Tala			Quit; Day 6
Angelika "Angelicopter" Schmeing-Cruz; Jackie's friend/Radio DJ	Tala	Tala			Quit; Day 6
Filo Cucueco; Ellen's husband/Businessman	Tala	Tala			Quit; Day 6
Ellen Adarna; Filo's wife/Actress	Tala	Tala			Quit; Day 6
Maria Isabel "Maribel" Lopez; Mara's mother/Beauty queen/Actress	Bulan	Tala			3rd voted out Day 8
Isabel Granada†; Chuckie's love teammate/Actress/Singer	Tala	Tala	Bulan		4th voted out Day 12
Carlo Gonzales; Arthur's cousin/Commercial model/Actor	Tala	Tala	Tala		5th voted out Day 15
Chuckie Dreyfus; Isabel's love teammate/Actor/Musical composer	Tala	Tala	Tala	Apolaki	6th voted out 1st jury member Day 18
Arthur Solinap; Carlo's cousin/Actor	Tala	Tala	Bulan	Apolaki	7th voted out 2nd jury member Day 21
John Odulio; Arnold's teammate/Member of the Philippine Volcanoes	Bulan	Bulan	Bulan	Apolaki	8th voted out 3rd jury member Day 23
Gino Dela Peña; Stef's boyfriend/TV host/Commercial model	Bulan	Bulan	Bulan	Apolaki	9th voted out 4th jury member Day 26
Arnold Aninion; John's teammate/Member of the Philippine Volcanoes	Bulan	Bulan	Tala	Apolaki	10th voted out 5th jury member Day 28
Mary "Maey" Bautista; Betong's comedic partner/Comedienne/TV host	Tala	Tala	Tala	Apolaki	11th voted out 6th jury member Day 32
Casey "KC Montero" Miller; Geneva's ex-husband/TV host/Actor/Former MTV Philippines VJ	Bulan	Bulan	Bulan	Apolaki	12th voted out 7th jury member Day 34
Stef Prescott; Gino's girlfriend/StarStruck Avenger/Actress	Bulan	Bulan	Tala	Apolaki	Second Runner-up
Mara Yokohama; Maribel's daughter/Professional surfer	Bulan	Bulan	Tala	Apolaki	First Runner-up
Albert "Betong" Sumaya Jr. Maey's comedic partner/Comedian/TV host	Tala	Tala	Bulan	Apolaki	Sole Survivor

The Total Votes is the number of votes a castaway has received during Tribal Councils (either solo or as part of a pair) where the castaway is eligible to be voted out of the game. It does not include the votes received during the final Tribal Council.

== The game ==
Cycles in this article refer to the three-day periods in the game (unless indicated), composed of at least the Immunity Challenge and the subsequent Tribal Council. Except on the first cycle, every cycle begins at the end of the previous Tribal Council. So any events that occurred after a Tribal Council will be chronicled in the next cycle.

Cycle no.	Air dates	Challenge winner(s)		Temptation reward		Eliminated	Finish
Cycle no.	Air dates	Reward	Immunity	Exiled	Result	Eliminated	Finish
01	November 14 to 18 and November 21 to 22, 2011	John and Arnold		Jackie; Angelicopter	Declined	Geneva (Note: Geneva decided to quit the game; however, the producers gave KC a chance to play the game as a solo contestant.)	Quit; Day 2
01	November 14 to 18 and November 21 to 22, 2011	Isabel and Chuckie (Note: Two pairs who first completed the challenge won immunity. Note that the first Reward Challenge occurred before the castaways were grouped into tribes.)		Jackie; Angelicopter	Declined	Geneva	Quit; Day 2
01	November 14 to 18 and November 21 to 22, 2011	Tala		Jackie; Angelicopter	Declined	Alyssa; Aifha	1st voted out 2nd voted out Day 4
02	November 23 to 25 and November 28 to 29, 2011	Bulan	Bulan	Maribel; Mara	Accepted	Jackie; Angelicopter	Quit; Day 6
03	November 29 to December 2, 2011	Bulan	Bulan (Note: An additional reward was given to another tribe.)	John; Arnold	Declined	Filo; Ellen	Quit; Day 6
03	November 29 to December 2, 2011	Bulan	Bulan	John; Arnold	Declined	Maribel	3rd voted out Day 8
04	December 5 to 9, 2011	Tala	Tala	Carlo	Accepted	Isabel	4th voted out Day 12
05	December 9 and December 12 to 15, 2011	Tala	Bulan	Arnold	Declined	Carlo	5th voted out Day 15
06	December 16 and December 19 to 23, 2011	None (Note: There was no reward challenge due to the merge, but a fake reward challenge happened that led them into the merge.)	KC	None (Note: Temptation reward was retired at the merge.)		Chuckie	6th voted out 1st jury member Day 18
07	December 23, December 26 to 30, 2011 and January 2, 2012	KC	Betong, KC, Stef (Note: KC, Betong and Stef obtained their immunity from a bribe during the Immunity Challenge.)	None		Arthur	7th voted out 2nd jury member Day 21
07	December 23, December 26 to 30, 2011 and January 2, 2012	KC	Arnold	None		Arthur	7th voted out 2nd jury member Day 21
08	January 3 to 6 and January 9, 2012	John [Arnold, Betong]	Arnold	None		John	8th voted out 3rd jury member Day 23
09	January 10 to 13 and January 16 to 17, 2012	KC [Betong, Gino]	Stef	None		Gino	9th voted out 4th jury member Day 26
10	January 18 to 20 and January 23 to 24, 2012	Arnold	~~Maey~~ (Betong) (Note: Maey won immunity, but gave it to Betong before the vote.)	None		Arnold	10th voted out 5th jury member Day 28
11	January 25 to 27 and January 30 to February 2, 2012	KC [Stef]	KC	None		Maey	11th voted out 6th jury member Day 32
11	January 25 to 27 and January 30 to February 2, 2012	KC [Maey]	KC	None		Maey	11th voted out 6th jury member Day 32
12	February 3 and 6, 2012	None	Mara	None		KC	12th voted out 7th jury member Day 34
Finale	February 7 to 10, 2012					Jury vote	
Finale	February 7 to 10, 2012					Stef	Second Runner-up
Finale	February 7 to 10, 2012					Mara	First Runner-up
Finale	February 7 to 10, 2012					Betong	Sole Survivor

In the case of multiple tribes or people who win reward or immunity, they are listed in order of finish, or alphabetically where it was a team effort; where one player won and invited others, the invitees are in brackets.

== Episodes ==
=== Cycle 1: Days 1-4 ===
- Pair Reward Challenge: Castaways must free themselves from a water cage, and swim to the shore. Along the way are mystery sacks that may contain items that are useful in any way during their stay in the island which they could retrieve at their discretion. Upon reaching the shore, the castaways must first bind themselves with their respective partners. After that, they must hit the containers hung onto a tree using a long bamboo stick. Inside two of those containers each contain two immunity bracelets. When a pair finds the immunity bracelets, they must run to the flag to finish the game. The first two pairs to have the immunity bracelets wins the Reward Challenge.
  - Reward: Immunity bracelet
- Tribal Reward/Immunity Challenge: Six climbers must climb several A frames, bringing with them three abaca ropes. Before climbing to the next A frame, all the members of the tribe must be completed and should station themselves on a designated mat. They would repeat this sequence until the tribe had reached the last mat. After the climbers had completed the A frame obstacle, they needed to carry a crate to a starting point (in a form of another mat) for the next part of the challenge. When the tribe had reached the starting point, they need to tie the crate using the rope that they brought along with them. After that, they would put the crate in a long sliding platform, and pull it until it reached the other three members of the tribe who are assigned to solve a puzzle located inside the crate. The first tribe to finish the puzzle and reading aloud its contents wins reward and immunity.
  - Reward: Shelter materials, flint, and a hammock
  - Temptation Reward: Immunity bracelet for each member of the pair.
  - Temptation Consequence: One member must transfer to the opposing tribe. If one member would be voted out in a Tribal Council, the partner would have to be eliminated as well.

Day 1: After undergoing a mud ritual, the castaways were put on a water cage, of which was meters away from the shore. Host Richard Guttierez arrived via seaplane and introduced them to the game and to their first challenge. In the challenge, many of the castaways prioritized looking for the necklaces rather than gathering supplies. The Philippine Volcanoes pair of Arnold & John and former love team Isabel & Chuckie were first to retrieve the necklaces. The castaways then inspected the supplies they gathered during the challenge. Through a schoolyard pick, the two tribes were formed. The Volcanoes duo, the first two members of Bulan, were joined by dating partners Gino & Stef, ex-couple KC & Geneva, mother and daughter Maribel & Mara, and friends Alyssa & Aifha. On the other hand, Isabel & Chuckie's tribe Tala had cousins Carlo & Arthur, couple Ellen & Filo, friends Jackie & Angelicopter, and comedic duo Betong & Maey as its members. The tribes were then directed to their camps, where they started to gather food and build shelter. At Bulan, as the rest of the tribe worked, Gino saw the Volcanoes making alliances with KC. KC was also able to make fire using only bamboo, something the entire Tala tribe were not able to achieve after several tries. Although still early, tribal life had already started to take its emotional toll on Geneva and Aifha, with Geneva already airing her intention to quit. In the evening, a remark by Aifha caused an argument between her and Alyssa.

Day 2: As tribal life went on in Bulan, Geneva was still stressed and was crying. After KC answered to the producer that he wanted to continue the game alone, Geneva decided to quit after having an argument with KC and with the resident psychologist about the ethics of the game. However, the producers decided to give KC the chance to stay in the game as a solo contestant. Difficulties faced by Bulan en route to the challenge area due to the weather and emerging swells forced the producers to postpone the challenge to the next day.

Day 3: In the Reward/Immunity Challenge, Bulan initially led up to the puzzle part, where Tala caught up. Maribel already had the answer to the puzzle, Tagumpay ng isa ay tagumpay ng lahat ("The success of one is the success of all"), while her tribe's puzzle was still unfinished. This enabled Tala to overtake Bulan and complete their puzzle, winning the challenge. After Bulan left, Tala was told of the Temptation Reward. After much deliberation, the tribe chose Angelicopter and Jackie, who stayed behind to see the temptation reward. After weighing their options and their tribe's welfare, the two decided not to accept the temptation and returned to camp, where they discussed about the temptation reward and why they did not accept it. At Bulan, upon noticing a large beehive near camp and the size of the bees that inhabited it, the tribe decided to move their camp to a safer location. At Tala, after several tries using their flint, the tribe finally had a small flame which petered out moments later, forcing the tribe to spend their third straight night without fire. Back at Bulan, after the tribe had a brief mock fire dance to amuse themselves, Maribel apologized to her tribemates about what happened during the Reward/Immunity Challenge. She also expressed wanting to come back to her comfort zone, being the oldest in the tribe.

Day 4: At Tala, after several failed attempts by her tribemates, Jackie finally made a large sustainable flame for her tribe. At Bulan, Maribel and Mara were already presumed that they were already next due to Maribel's desires to go home. Maribel even wanted to tell her tribe to vote her out. Later, while everybody frolicked at the beach, Arnold lost his immunity bracelet in the wave, making him concerned on his life in the game. But he was assured by his alliance, particularly KC, that the loss of the bracelet was already minor compared to the strength of the alliance itself. At Tribal Council, Richard regarded the game as one not for the weak and Geneva's resignation from the game as a "waste" of a spot for the show. Talk then turned to the strengths and weaknesses of the tribe. It was then announced that, instead of a single person, a pair would be voted out instead. In the end, rather than follow Maribel's wish, the Volcanoes, KC, Gino, and Stef decided to keep Maribel and Mara and instead send Alyssa and Aifha home, 7–2.

=== Cycle 2: Days 5-6 ===
- Reward Challenge: One member would play as a goalkeeper floating on their own raft, while the rest would ride with connected rafts. Using paddles with two holes, they would scoop a ball and either pass it to a teammate or fling it to the opposing tribe's goal. Participants should not use their hands to pick up or throw their ball; they could only use their hands to maneuver their rafts. A participant who falls off their raft would temporarily be out of the game until they lift themselves back to their raft. First tribe to score three points would win the reward.
  - Reward: Fishing materials, snorkeling gear, condiments, and two large lapu-lapu.
  - Temptation Reward: Immunity bracelet for each member of the pair.
  - Temptation Consequence: If accepted, one member must transfer to the opposing tribe. But this time, if one member would be voted out in a Tribal Council, it wouldn't affect their partner as long as they still have their own immunity bracelet.
- Immunity Challenge: In a series of matches, each team had to push a large ball across a mud field into their opponents' goal, while preventing their opponents from doing the same. One ball per tribe would be deployed in each match. Opponents could only hold each other on the waist and riding on the ball and pinning or hitting the opponent were not allowed. First tribe to score three points would win immunity.

Day 5: The two tribes faced off in a heated Reward Challenge where, along with the removal of goalkeepers and one pair per tribe, Tala scored the first two points. With several members of Bulan deciding to paddle with their hands, they eventually tied with Tala, then stole another goal for the win, 3–2. Bulan chose Mara and her mother Maribel to stay for the Temptation Reward. After much mother-daughter talk and taking in the pros and cons, especially on Maribel's and the Bulan tribe's welfare and the possibility of a tribal shuffle, Mara and Maribel accepted the bracelets with the latter deciding to be part of Tala, wanting to weaken it further. Naturally, Bulan was surprised to see Mara alone upon return to camp. Mara then divulged to Gino her mother's transfer to Tala, which she eventually told to the rest of the tribe except Stef. Meanwhile, at Tala, the tribe was also shocked and horrified to see Maribel becoming one of their own, with Maribel acting like she was forced to switch tribes, to the point that several members, notably Jackie, Angelicopter, and Ellen, were already intimidated by her. Maribel made further fabrications about a tribal shuffle, making Isabel and Chuckie think about giving up their immunity bracelets to whoever would be transferred to Bulan. Later that night, Chuckie and Ellen talked about stealing Maribel's immunity bracelet, not immediately believing Maribel's story of how she produced hers.

Day 6: At Tala, the women took advantage of Maribel's absence to look for her immunity bracelet among her belongings while she was talking to Carlo. They were not successful, not knowing she had already hid the bracelet in her underwear even before she arrived at camp. The two tribes met again in the Immunity Challenge, where, despite some roughhousing from both tribes, Bulan swept Tala 3–0. As Bulan celebrated, Jackie noted Maribel gesturing and talking to Mara in Japanese, a language both mother and daughter understood. To Jackie, it was a sign that Maribel already wanted out the game. After a brief stay at camp, Tala proceeded to Tribal Council, where talk initially focused on the roughhousing that went on in the Immunity Challenge, particularly the shouting match that ensued between the Volcanoes duo and several Tala members after Arnold rolled the ball over Carlo. The discussion then turned to the most averse reception Maribel had upon her arrival to Tala. Finally, Richard revealed that in the relatively short history of the Philippine Survivor franchise, Tala was already regarded as the whiniest tribe due to complaints its members had, most importantly on personal safety, to which Richard reminded that anyone who competes in Survivor must endure the rawest nature could offer; those who could not stand the elements and fierceness of the game must quit if they so desire. Just as the tribe was about to vote, Angelicopter and Jackie expressed their decision to leave the game as to them, the current dynamic was already going against their morals, particularly Jackie's. So the host pulled the pair's nametags from their torches and tossed them into the fire, signifying the pair's exit.

=== Cycle 3: Days 7-8 ===
- Reward Challenge: Using materials provided to them, the tribe must devise a five-minute performance number to be presented in front of a panel of judges. The tribe that was adjudged to have the better performance would win the reward.
  - Reward: A breakfast buffet and three egg-laying chickens.
  - Temptation Reward: Hotdog sandwiches and ₱100,000.
  - Temptation Consequence: The reward the tribe earned would be transferred to the other tribe.
- Immunity Challenge: Standing on a platform, each contestant would hold onto a net filled with a kilogram of seafood on each hand at shoulder level. A belt marker would be worn at each contestant's waist; if either net would go lower than the marker, the contestant would be eliminated. Contestants who are eliminated would then have 10 seconds to choose a tribemate, who would then take their load. Last person standing would win immunity for their tribe.
  - Additional reward: Six kilograms of seafood.

Night of Day 6: Soon after Tribal Council ended, Filo and Ellen also decided to quit as well, citing their safety and the game's intensity. Meanwhile, the Tala tribe was instructed to head to the production area instead of their camp due to inclement weather to be brought by Typhoon Pedring; Bulan already evacuated to the production area while Tala was heading to Tribal Council.

Day 7: As the rains from Typhoon Pedring poured and the tribes amused themselves to pass the time, Stef was treated for the sunburns she obtained the day before, while Chuckie, Isabel, Betong, and Maey plotted on how to use Chuckie and Isabel's immunity bracelets and/or to steal Maribel's. Later, Richard visited the tribes as they have brought his sister Ruffa Gutierrez and his mother Annabelle Rama, who brought to the tribes materials and instructions for the upcoming Reward Challenge. After much practice, the two tribes faced off in the Reward Challenge, to be overseen by Ruffa and Annabelle as well as a small audience of local children. Although Tala had more members with acting experience, both tribes gave performances that amused Ruffa, Annabelle, and the children. As a result, there was no consensus on which tribe won; instead, Bulan was declared the winner by points of 83.5% while Tala received 66%. After Tala left, Bulan chose the Volcanoes duo to take a peek at the Temptation Reward, which the pair decidedly refused.

Day 8: Bulan enjoyed their newfound breakfast reward, while Tala returned to their daily routine, seeing that their camp had withstood the bad weather. Isabel and Maey discussed that they would continue to target Maribel unless they see her immunity bracelet. At Bulan, although camp was also spared, the tribe again relocated it to somewhere drier. The tribes then competed in the Immunity Challenge, the first endurance challenge of the season. Maey accidentally dropped part of her new load, leaving Chuckie to battle against the Volcanoes duo alone. Unable to bear a total of 12 kilos on his hands any longer, Chuckie eventually gave Tala its fourth consecutive loss. While an exchange of hugs ensued between opposing tribe members, Maey saw Gino covertly transfer an immunity bracelet to Maribel's shirt. As Tala was returning to camp, everyone was beginning to be irked by Maribel's continued presence to the point that Carlo had an argument with Isabel and Maribel. Meanwhile, Betong and Maey prepared themselves on their potential department should voting go against them. In this Tribal Council, the host threw Ellen and Filo's nametags at the firepit to signify their quitting just after the recent tribal council. Maribel tried to explain her actions, even denying that she blew the previous two challenges. After the ensuing vote, Maribel as well as Chuckie & Isabel used their immunity bracelets. But with all votes going to either Maribel or the former loveteam, the tribe was forced to vote again which resulted to Maribel being voted out 6–1.

=== Cycle 4: Days 9-12 ===
- Reward Challenge: One member from each tribe would compete in a round. In a round, the two competitors would spin a wheel each. The first wheel contains the names of vegetables and fruits while the second one have different portions from an animal. The both chosen fruit/vegetable and the animal part would be mixed in a blender with bee larvae, worms and water, and be made as a drink. Whoever finishes first would win the round; first tribe to win five rounds would also win the reward.
  - Reward: A barbecue party by a waterfall.
  - Temptation Reward: Two anting-antings; a black and a gold one. The black anting-anting would add one vote while the gold one would subtract a vote in tribal council. The castaway who received it should not use it to himself/herself and only to be used to his/her tribemates.
  - Temptation Consequence: The castaway who received it would not join the barbecue party.
- Immunity Challenge: In a three-level platform, each tribe would assign a member in each level; whoever was on the highest level would pour water and be drained to the bamboos that would be used as the gutters. The members on the lower levels would support and connect the bamboos so the water will continuously drain in a large barrel. Once the barrel is full of water, it would release the puzzle pieces to be solved by a member. Whoever finishes the puzzle first win the immunity.

Day 9: Unaired

Day 10: Meeting up for the Reward Challenge, Bulan was shocked that Maribel was voted out, not as they predicted to happen. Richard instructed Mara to give her immunity bracelet back because it works as the twin of Maribel's bracelet as Maribel used hers already. If she don't give it back, she would be also eliminated the same as her mother. At the Reward Challenge, the first round was won by Arthur against John. Seven rounds happened on the challenge with the last round won again by Arthur against KC. With Tala winning the challenge, Carlo volunteered to receive the Temptation Reward without consulting the tribe while Arthur also wanted to get it because he thought he deserved to get it due to him winning the last round. Carlo accepted the temptation, preventing himself from experiencing the reward, as he deemed that the tribe would need it in the merge. Carlo told them about the anting-antings and later on, they leave him for the reward. Being lonely in the camp, Carlo made yellow bracelets for his tribemates and moved their firepit away from their tent. At Bulan, the tribe decided to barbecue one of their three chickens. While sleeping, Stef was bitten possibly by a Philippine cobra and was sent to a hospital in Manila to be treated. At this time, there was still no confirmation if whether or not Stef would still play Survivor.

Day 11: The tribes met and thought an immunity challenge would happen but instead, a tribal shuffle was held. Each pair was asked to pick two baskets face-to-face on a table that would contain their new buffs, which determine what tribe they would be. Mara and KC became a pair while any basket Gino picked, the other basket in front of it would be Stef's. When the baskets were opened, it was revealed that the pairs would be broken down with one going to Bulan and the other in Tala. Back at the camps, each tribe welcomed the new members warmly. At Bulan, talks on behind their backs were already circulating with the original Tala members, Arthur and Betong and the original Bulan members, KC, John and Gino in strategies to get rid of the original Bulan or Tala members respectively. At Tala, Arnold and Mara felt the warmth being there at their new tribe.

Day 12: At the Immunity Challenge, Bulan chose Gino as the drainer and John as the puzzle solver while Tala chose Chuckie to be the former one and Carlo as the latter one. There was a close race between the tribes as Tala's puzzles were released seconds after Bulan's. Carlo finished the puzzle first but it was put in opposite side so John had time to finish his first, yet Carlo turned his puzzle pieces quickly, winning the immunity for Tala. After winning the challenge, Maey and Chuckie were worried that either Betong or Isabel would be voted out. While in Bulan, talks about their voting started surfacing. The original Bulan members tried to bring Isabel to their side that she mentioned to Betong and Arthur that they would vote out the latter. After the original Bulan tribe's plan was ruined, John tried to talk to Arthur about bringing him to their side. At Tribal Council, the loss of the tribe at the Immunity Challenge and trust was discussed. Richard announced the end of doubles format as only one member would be voted out on every tribal council starting this day. A tie between Gino and Isabel was announced after the votes were revealed, with the members sticking with their old tribemates. A revote was instructed, still resulting to a tie. Gino and Isabel were then instructed to play the fire-making challenge to break the tie. Being the only one to build fire, Gino won the tiebreaker challenge, sending Isabel home.

=== Cycle 5: Days 13-15 ===
- Reward Challenge: The challenge was composed of 3 legs. At the first leg, from the shore, castaways would run to a mudpit, where they would find their own paddle, corresponding their tribe color. Then, they would go to the second leg. There, they would tie a basket at their waist level at their back. Using their paddle and hands, they would find three rope rings in their designated sandpile corresponding their tribe color. Once they found one, they would shoot it at their basket using the paddle. One member from each tribe who finds the three rope rings first would advance to the last leg. At the last leg, from their tribe mat, they would shoot each rope ring to a pole with hoops for each ring. Whoever shot all the rope rings first wins reward for their tribe.
  - Reward: Shower and coffee; immunity bracelet for the person who won it for the tribe; and the opportunity to pick first between Jon Hall and Akihiro Sato, Season 3 contestants, that would help them for the next immunity challenge.
  - Temptation Reward: ₱100,000
  - Temptation Consequence: The tribe would not get the shower.
- Immunity Challenge: A member from each tribe would play in a round. Both of them would slide on a large tarpaulin and would get a numbered ball that was assigned by the host. Once they got the right ball, they would shoot it in their basket attached on a wall. Whoever shoots first wins a point for that round; first tribe to get five points wins immunity.

Night of Day 12: Gino comforted Betong and Arthur after the elimination of Isabel. The original Bulan alliance, KC, Gino and John, had planned to lose the immunity challenge so they can vote out Arthur.

Day 13: Stef finally came back after she was cured of the cobra's bite. Bulan practiced their throwing after they read the treemail that said throwing would be part of the reward challenge. At the Reward Challenge, Arnold was the first to find a rope ring and it progressed as he found all the three rope rings, that made Tala's third consecutive win. It led him to get an immunity bracelet. Then, Richard called Jon Hall and Akihiro Sato and asked Tala who they want to be part of their tribe. Tala chose Jon Hall as he was considered the biggest threat of the previous season while Akihiro Sato, last season's Celebrity Sole Survivor, went to Bulan. For the Temptation Reward, Arnold volunteered to go and declined the money to strengthen the tribe's trust to him. As a reward, Tala enjoyed their fresh shower and hot coffees. Back to their camps, Akihiro and Jon taught their tribemates how to improve their shelters and gave some advice about playing the game.

Day 14: In the Immunity Challenge, at the first round, Akihiro and Jon competed with each other. Jon led first but Akihiro ended up winning the round. Bulan led by winning the first two rounds, but Tala caught up thereafter. After a tight race, Gino ended up winning the last round accidentally, although their goal was not to win. After the challenge, Akihiro and Jon bade their goodbyes. At Tala, instead of worrying for the next day's Tribal Council, they bond together at playing at the sand. At Bulan, Gino reached Betong to join their alliance because they were thinking Arnold and Mara is now in alliance with the original Tala members, especially Carlo. Betong would see if he would join their alliance. Back to Tala, talks about voting out Stef had been going on. Stef had thought she was the next one to be voted out because she was always the one left out when her tribemates were having a group talk.

Day 15: The next day, Stef made friendship bracelets so her tribemates wouldn't think of her to vote out. At the Tribal Council, after the voting, Arnold gave his immunity bracelet to Stef, which shocked the original Tala members. Stef used the immunity bracelet and when the votes were revealed, Tala's perceived leader Carlo was blindsided and was sent home without even using or passing his anting-antings, 3–0.

=== Cycle 6: Days 16-18 ===
- Immunity Challenge: Contestants must first traverse over a bamboo wall, then cross a bamboo bridge maze. When one falls off the bamboo maze, they had to restart from the beginning. Next, they would cross through an elastic wall and run through a burlap maze to search for three bags containing three-dimensional puzzle pieces. Once the bags were retrieved, they would run to a table and assemble the puzzle, a replica of the Manunggul Jar. First to finish the puzzle would win immunity.

Night of Day 15: After the Tribal Council, Arnold explained his unexpected actions to Maey and Chuckie. They were still horrified of what happened. Stef started crying due to Arnold's deceptive actions in the Tribal Council and her not being informed of the plan to give to her the immunity bracelet.

Day 16: The tribes met for a reward challenge, that they didn't know was fake. Richard instructed them to dig a wooden cylinder on the sandpile and go back to their tribe mat for their further instructions. Maey was the first to find a cylinder while John was the last one. They were then instructed to open them and it contained their new merged tribe buffs. Richard later revealed that their tribe would be called Apolaki and also revealed their tribe flag. They were then instructed to go to their merge feast. They ate lechon and their respective favorite foods. They were entertained by the renowned Rachel Lobangco and Puerto Princesa performers. While eating lechon, Mara found an immunity bracelet hidden in the lechon's belly, which was almost nabbed by Stef. Chuckie and Maey talked about what happened at the last Tribal Council to their original Tala alliance while Arnold did the same to his original Bulan alliance. The new tribe used Bulan's camp as their new camp. The original Tala alliance was targeting Stef to be their new alliance member as she was seen as an outcast when she's with her original tribemates.

Day 17: They decided to build another camp to accommodate themselves, instead of expanding the old one. They received their first treemail consisting of drawings instead of words, which was later adapted on the next treemails. A sketch of their flag and paints were engraved, citing that they need to decorate their tribe, which was done by Maey and Stef. The Bulan boys started thinking about the closeness of Stef to the Tala alliance, which would definitely bring a tie if she went with them. The castaways competed in the first Individual Immunity Challenge where KC, Stef, and Mara forged ahead while everybody else was stuck at the bamboo maze. KC was the first to finish his puzzle and win immunity. Back at camp, they found that the chicken they were about eat suddenly disappeared. Betong noted Mara's lack of remorse for the missing chicken as she was the one who tied it. Betong felt he had received the full burden when it was lost although he just helped Mara bring it back to the cage.

Day 18: Betong saw a fish floating on the waters, in which he and Stef decided to cook. Betong, Maey and Stef cited Mara's lack of consideration as she took the cooked fish first, not letting the others eat it first. The tribe noted Chuckie sleeping and not feeling well (Chuckie himself later attributed this to lifelong intermittent bouts of vertigo). With rain continuously pouring at camp, the nearby stream started to widen into a river, eroding its sandy banks. This forced the tribe to be evacuated to a safer place. Later, the castaways were interviewed by Celebrity Showdown contestant Aubrey Miles about tribal life and their fellow tribemates. At Apolaki's first Tribal Council, Aubrey revealed the results of her survey, surprising the castaways, especially Stef, which received most of the votes when it comes to questions involving deceit. Aubrey also noted Gino's sarcasm when she interviewed him. Talk then turned to how the game had changed the individual dynamics of three of the whole pairs still in the game, Stef and Gino, Betong and Maey and the Volcanoes duo. Despite the negative situation in which Stef was slowly finding herself in, concerns over Chuckie's wellness and perceived weakness prevailed as the tribe made him the first member of the jury, 9–1.

=== Cycle 7: Days 19-21 ===
- Reward Challenge: Contestants were each tied to a rope that was wrapped around a rail. They would need to maneuver themselves around the rail to lengthen the rope to which they can run to platters of varying distance containing coins. Assigned with pouches, they would fill it with coins and run back to their main table to unload their coins. There would be five coin platters for each contestant. The challenge will end when at least one contestant would gather coins from their fifth and farthest platter and return to their main table. If no one would reach their fifth platter within five minutes, an additional two minutes would be allotted for the challenge to end. The one with the highest amount of coins gathered would win the reward.
  - Reward: Steak and mashed potatoes and the power to choose what food would his tribemates receive (between, in descending order, spaghetti, chocolate cake, peanut butter and jelly sandwich, monay (type of bread), tuyo (dried, salted fish), two tofu cubes, a candy and a glass of water).
- Immunity Challenge: The castaways would hang onto a pole as long as they can. The last person left wins immunity.

Night of Day 18: Upon camp, Stef was starting to doubt about her standing in the game, knowing her Bulan tribemates are gradually abandoning her. Meanwhile, the remaining Tala members planned on how to align with Stef, even though it would still put them on a disadvantage by numbers.

Day 19: In the morning, Betong divulged with Maey his worries about their future in the game, to which Maey assured to him about sticking with each as long as they could. The castaways then competed in the first individual reward challenge. No one had reached the fifth platter after five minutes so an additional two minutes were added. KC led up to the fifth platter with Arnold catching up, with KC finishing up the challenge. With him enabling to finish the challenge, he obtained the highest amount of money with ₱7,422.25 while Maey received the lowest with ₱1,189.00. KC received his food and as part of the reward, he chose one-by-one to who gets what. After KC's hard selection, Richard announced that letters from their loved ones would be given but only to KC and the first four who KC selected to receive the first four foods: Maey (spaghetti), Gino (chocolate cake), Arnold (peanut butter and jelly sandwich) and John (monay). Only excerpts from their letters was given to the last four: Stef (tuyo), Mara (tofu cubes), Arthur (candy) and Betong (glass of water). KC was further given an opportunity to pick from the last four who would get a whole letter. He chose Arthur as they have a secret alliance. Back to the camp, each castaway shared their letters to the whole tribe. Stef and Arthur talked about voting out Arnold with KC and the other original Tala members. Arnold and Mara discussed their strong alliance of two till the end. That night, Betong talked about his life to Arnold when he used to be a bagger in a supermarket, which Arnold related to as he used to be a gasoline boy in New Zealand.

Day 20: Betong talked with Gino about what he and Arnold had in their conversation last night. Further on, they talked about the closeness between Mara and Arnold. This situation gave way to Gino assuring Betong that he and Maey would replace Mara and Arnold in their alliance and that they would bring the comedic duo to top 5 or 6. They also brought up the topic of voting out Arnold. Gino revealed to Betong that KC was the one who planned to vote out Arnold. Later on, Betong and Maey talked about Stef and how they need to be wary of her as she might be playing them around. Gino told John what he and Betong talked about and planned to bring him and Maey to top 4. They also planned to flirt with Mara to gain her trust, as what Arnold did. In the Immunity Challenge, a series of bribes were given by Richard to determine the winner faster. The first bribe was whoever gets a Survivor logo tattoo would get an immunity in the next tribal council; this was taken by KC, Betong and Stef. After a number of other bribes, the challenge was left between Maey, Mara and Arnold. After 3 hours and 26 minutes, Maey went down. Mara fell down from the pole after 4 hours and 14 minutes and Arnold came to aid her. Not desired by majority of the tribe as they plan to vote him out, Arnold won the immunity challenge.

Day 21: That morning, Maey prepared rice with taros, which Betong harvested. Maey brought up the topic that Betong doesn't have a girlfriend, but the latter told that he dated Patricia Javier, a sexy actress, for one week, while KC avoided the conversation. Gino warned Betong and Maey to be wary of Stef and insisted that she's with Arnold and Mara for final three. Maey told Betong and Arthur that Stef heard the conversation of John, Arnold and Mara: that the latter three would vote out three of them one-by-one. Stef and Arthur strategized about how they'll vote out Arnold, Mara and Gino, with KC as their leader. Betong went back in his daily job, which is picking firewood. The Bulan boys caught some crabs and decided to build a trap to catch other crabs. At Tribal Council, talks about the tribemates that they trust the most and least were discussed. The original Bulan members, even Stef, stuck to their first plan: to vote out Tala members one-by-one; and Arthur was sent to the jury, 6–3.

=== Cycle 8: Days 22-23 ===
- Reward Challenge: Standing almost 140 feet away from a giant sling/catapult, the castaways would try to catch balls released from the sling/catapult using their baskets. First castaway to catch three balls would win the reward.
  - Reward: All afternoon in a spa with two chosen companions.
- Immunity Challenge: The castaways would use two metal handles to hold a metal bar in tension above a tile. The last castaway to keep tension on the bar and keep it from breaking the tile would win immunity.

Day 22: Early in the morning, the castaways discovered that the crab trap they made the day before worked. On the other hand, Maey and Betong tried not to think that they might be next voted out, being the remaining original Tala members. At the Reward Challenge, after a series of jostles, John won the reward, who took Arnold and Betong with him. While at the spa, the trio sealed an alliance. Back at camp, Stef and Mara confronted one another about their feelings with each other. That night, John, Arnold and Betong came back, with their tribemates becoming jealous in how they smelled fresh and sweet.

Day 23: A psychic visited them and went to determine their aura. She gave some advice in terms of what would happen in the future, not answering them straightforwardly. Mara thought that Stef was the one who suggested to the original Tala members to vote her out in the last tribal council. In line with this, Arnold interrogated Stef, which directed into a dispute. Gino went to stop it with him calming Stef down. At the Immunity Challenge, after a couple of drops, it was left between KC, Arnold and Gino. KC discovered a trick to lift his metal bar higher. Gino tried to do the same, but failed, resulting to his metal bar sliding furthermore with only half of his handles now supporting it. After 15 minutes, KC tried to do the trick again but it slid down completely, eliminating him out of the challenge. After 21 minutes and 45 seconds, Gino's bar finally slid down, concluding the challenge with Arnold winning immunity back-to-back. Back at camp, John let KC know that he might be voted out, as the plan to vote Arnold out was cancelled. John made up a new plan to save KC, with Mara as the target, provided that the latter does not use her immunity bracelet. On the other hand, Betong and Maey, as original Tala members, felt that they were not in the midst of being voted out. At Tribal Council, Richard questioned the status of the original Bulan alliance. This alliance was indeed tarnished when one of its members, John, despite using his intuition as what the psychic told him, was blindsided and became the third member of the jury, 4-2-1-1.

=== Cycle 9: Days 24-26 ===
- Reward Challenge: Each team, composing of a contestant and their loved one, would collect mud from a mud pit using their bodies and deposit the mud to a bucket in five minutes. The team with the most mud as determined by weight would win the reward.
  - Reward: An overnight stay at a resort with their loved one, along with two other castaway-loved one pair.
- Immunity Challenge: The challenge consists of two stations. At the first station, the loved ones would dig in the sand to find a round peg. Then, they would use it to decipher a table maze. Once finished, they would break a tile, signalling the takeover of their paired castaway on the challenge. From that point, the castaways would climb to a giant wall using climbing pegs. Upon reaching the top, they then must solve a word puzzle. First castaway to finish the puzzle wins immunity.

Night of Day 23: The castaways talked about John's unexpected ouster, which led to discussions on their dealings with John and a common conclusion that he double-crossed everyone, including Arnold.

Day 24: Before competing in the reward challenge, the castaways were reunited with red buff-wearing loved ones: Gino's sister, Maey's sister, Betong's sister, Stef's mother, and Mara's father (who brought his newly finished surfboard), as well as KC's brother Troy (in the latter's second appearance in the franchise as a loved one) and Arnold's Volcanoes teammate Chris Hitch. By default, the castaways were told that their loved ones, regardless of the result, would stay with them at camp and would help them in challenges before the next Tribal Council. In the Reward Challenge, KC and Troy almost filled their bucket with mud, clearly winning the challenge. KC chose Gino, Betong and the latter two's respective sisters to join him and Troy in the reward. KC was then given another choice of having a loved one among the others who would not accompany their castaway partner at camp, visiting instead the next day for the immunity challenge. Knowing every other loved one present is related to their partner, KC selected Chris since he was the odd man out. The other castaways then went back at camp with their loved ones. The loved ones, upon arriving at camp, became surprised on the current living conditions of the castaways. They were then given instructions on how to live at camp. KC, Troy and their invitees headed to the resort where they ate dinner and had a sleep.

Day 25: Before KC, Troy and their invitees went back to camp, different activities were prepared for them, which were ziplining (where Betong's sister sprained her arm), tomcar riding and horseback riding. At the same time in the camp, the castaways and their loved ones (except Arnold's teammate) surfed using the surfboard brought by Mara's father. Instead of heading back to camp after the reward, KC, Troy, and their invitees immediately were brought in the Challenge area. In the Immunity Challenge, KC and Arnold had strong leads over the other castaways. However, they struggled in solving the Filipino word puzzle, resulting to Stef (being the fifth one to reach the top) winning the challenge by solving the word ALYANSA. After the challenge, the castaways said their goodbyes to their loved ones. Back at camp, Mara noticed the disappearance of the surfboard, which went along with his dad. Stef, Maey and Betong enjoyed Stef's newfound accessory, the immunity necklace, with Arnold noting that this is an act of showiness. The castaways noticed how Arnold became so nice and hardworking at camp, knowing that the latter is no longer immune. The castaways then spent their night stargazing.

Day 26: When Maey was hanging blankets on the clothesline, Arnold and Mara came and offered her Mara's immunity bracelet. After that, Betong, Maey, Arnold and Mara bonded around by the sea and talked about the latter's offer to give the immunity bracelet. KC noticed how the four were having a private talk away from the camp, so he interrupted. But talks about it continued later, with Mara and Arnold assuring them the two spots in the final three, with either him or Mara getting the last spot or be the last jury member. Before Tribal Council, Mara purposely gave her immunity bracelet to Maey, with the latter objecting it. However, Betong told his partner to get it, and so she agreed. At Tribal Council, talks were about their reasons in joining the game. Due to the late change of alliance by Betong and Maey, Gino was blindsided and became the fourth jury member, 4–2–1.

=== Cycle 10: Days 27-28 ===
- Reward Challenge: From the starting point, the castaways would roll their six crates one-by-one until they reach their designated final platform. Once they placed all of their crates, they would assemble a three-step stair puzzle. After the puzzle was checked, the castaway would then drag a rope to reveal their flag. Whoever finishes first, wins the reward.
  - Reward: ₱ 250,000 to their chosen beneficiary.
- Immunity Challenge: The castaways would balance a small wooden statue on top of a pole. At regular intervals, the player would add an additional section to the bottom of the pole, making the pole longer and harder to balance. The last castaway still holding the wooden statue up would win.

Night of Day 26: Mara and Arnold were enthusiastic about what happened at the previous Tribal Council, calling it their best plan currently in the game, while Stef, KC, Maey and Betong just slept, overhearing their remarks.

Day 27: The tribe made a meal of crabs with coconut milk, which they considered as a gourmet meal. Betong and Maey found out that the latter was the second option to be voted out if Arnold uses Mara's immunity bracelet, which would result of her and Mara fighting in the tiebreaker challenge. The duo explained to KC why they voted off Gino instead of Arnold, not telling him about the immunity bracelet they received. Without a strong alliance, KC and Stef thought about aligning themselves with Betong and Maey. In the Reward Challenge, videos from their beneficiaries were revealed. The beneficiaries were: KC's maid, Mara's maid, Maey's spiritual adviser, Stef's aunt, Arnold's aunt and Betong's friend. KC and Arnold led the challenge. Afterwards, Stef and Mara started cheering for Betong as his beneficiary has colon cancer, and they felt he needed the money the most. Despite all the support Betong is receiving, Arnold ultimately won the reward, himself feeling some guilt that Betong didn't win. On the other side, he felt that his aunt also needed the money as she also has a disorder. Back at camp, Betong was still depressed about losing the challenge for his friend, to which KC and Arnold offered help after the game. It was later revealed that his friend died on October 28, 2011.

Day 28: While preparing their meal, Stef got irritated by Arnold. Stef, Maey and Betong talked about voting Arnold out with Stef not knowing Maey has Mara's immunity bracelet. Maey, Betong, Stef and KC talked about the relationship between Mara and Arnold and also teased about the names of their future children. At the Immunity Challenge, Mara was the first one out. Next was KC and Stef who went at the same time. Then, Betong came next, leaving Arnold and Maey. When Arnold was about to reach the next section of the pole, his statue fell off, giving Maey her dream of beating Arnold in a challenge, and immunity as well. When Mara hugged Maey, she whispered if she can have her immunity bracelet back to her. On the other side, Mara also came to hug Stef, whispering that the latter is the one that the former chose to vote off in the upcoming Tribal Council. After the Immunity Challenge, Mara and Maey decided to climb a coconut tree, to experience it before the game ends. KC and Stef talked about the votes that the latter thought of happening: 4 votes to Arnold and 2 votes against her, with KC advising her to make sure of this with Maey and Betong. Stef went to Maey and Betong and told them what Mara had said to her after the immunity challenge. KC notified Maey that her and Betong's votes would be the deciding point on who would be the next jury member between Arnold and Stef. The castaways then goofed around, having a fashion show between the boys. Maey and Betong went on a disagreement on whom to vote out, then told KC of them having Mara's immunity bracelet. Later on, Mara and Arnold tried to steal the immunity bracelet from Maey's and Betong's bags, but stopped soon after as they felt that they can't do it. Mara and Arnold then decided to ask Betong to give it back but was left disappointed of Betong not answering them. At Tribal Council, they had a chat about Gino's ouster, to which Betong concluded as a great plan, as Maey might be voted off if it didn't happen. The conversation continued about who are the threats and what does the word "deserving" mean to them. When they are about to vote, Maey decided to transfer her immunity necklace to Betong. After an intense voting, Richard announced that the use of an immunity bracelet would be valid only until the next tribal council. The votes were then read, with Betong and Maey siding with Stef and KC in voting off Arnold, 4–2.

=== Cycle 11: Days 29-32 ===
- First Reward Challenge: Each castaway is provided a one-arm balance with a small disk at the far end. During the challenge, the host will call out specific dishware that the castaway must take and stack on the far end of the balance. Should any part of a castaway's stack fall, he/she is out of the challenge. Last castaway remaining wins immunity.
  - Reward: Helicopter tour of Palawan, an overnight stay in Flower Island and a visit to a pearl farm in a nearby island.
- Second Reward Challenge: From the starting point, the blindfolded castaways would go under, over and under three hitching rails to be guided by a rope. At the end, a puzzle table awaits them, which has nine symbols they need to memorize using their sense of touch. After which they would obtain three bags of puzzle pieces and go back to the starting point doing the same routine on the hitching rails. There, another puzzle table awaits, less the symbol pieces, which they must fill using the pieces in their bags. The castaways can repeatedly return to the puzzle guide doing the same routine if it deems necessary. First castaway to finish the puzzle wins reward.
  - Reward: A brand new car and the power to give another car to a fellow castaway.
- Immunity Challenge: Each castaway would stand on a slanted platform, attached to a large post near a mud pit, holding a rope attached to the post. The rope has four knots in it. Every three minutes, the castaways would transfer their hands a knot farther from the post, leaning back with their feet still in the platform. Last castaway standing wins immunity.

Night of Day 28: Mara was crying as they went back to camp after Arnold was ousted. She asked Maey to bring the bracelet back as the former said that it was the only item that will let her survive further in the game. Due to sympathy, Maey decided to bring it back to her. Mara then revealed to Stef that she had her immunity bracelet back. After the handing over of the bracelet, Betong argued to Maey about giving the bracelet back, and about why she didn't use it in the previous Tribal Council as what they had planned.

Day 29: Maey and Betong were now okay after talking with each other about their conflict last night. At the Reward Challenge, KC won and took Stef with him in the reward. While enjoying their reward, KC and Stef discussed about taking out Maey, then Betong, the two being the most liked by the jury. Later on, at the pearl farm, they received pearl necklaces as souvenirs. At camp, Mara started to make a letter to Arnold by sewing it to an old treemail. Betong told Maey that he's willing to be voted out if the immunity bracelet is not obtained. Betong and Maey noticed that Mara didn't do any chores and kept sewing all day. At night, while sewing, Mara was disrupted by a centipede and two rats.

Day 30: Maey talked to Mara peacefully about the immunity bracelet and if she could get it back, with Mara refusing. Still in the reward, KC and Stef planned to make Mara think about Stef's pearl necklace as having immunity, to make her curious and scared. The two also did snorkeling and kayaking, and received massages. Back at camp, Maey found that the things in her bag were messy and suspected Arnold and Mara as having messed it up hours before the last Tribal Council. Maey and Betong then read the finished letter of Mara to Arnold. They received a treemail, which was a task to find two eggs. Initially thinking that the eggs contain immunity bracelets, they found out that it was actually two ostrich eggs that they can eat. KC and Stef then returned to camp. Maey admitted to everyone that it was her own fault that the immunity bracelet is now with Mara. She even suggested to Mara to throw it out so that everyone would have a fair chance in the top 4. Mara then became curious about Stef's pearl necklace as having immunity. Solenn Heussaff, a finalist from the last season, went to their camp as a celebrity guest. They had a bonfire where she gave tips in playing the game, now that the end is near. She also revealed that she would have an overnight stay on their camp, as well as a one-on-one talk with each castaway.

Day 31: Solenn and the castaways left the camp for an activity, which was mangrove planting. After the activity, Solenn bade her goodbyes to the castaways. Back at camp, Betong and Maey noticed how Stef was becoming close to Mara since she and KC got back from the reward. The castaways then headed to the challenge area, which they thought to be an Immunity Challenge. It was actually another Reward Challenge, where KC won a car and gave another one to Maey. The plan of KC, Stef and Mara to vote out Maey became stronger now that the latter has a new car.

Day 32: At the Immunity Challenge, on their second knot, Maey fell first. Then, Richard called out to transfer to the third knot that led to Stef's removal from the challenge. All the while, Richard kept telling Mara to lean back and transfer to the designated knot. Betong was eliminated next that left Mara and KC on to the game. Eventually, KC fell, with Mara getting immunity. However, with Mara's continued violations, the producers reviewed the tapes and unanimously gave the immunity necklace to KC. They then went back to camp. While walking, KC stepped on a sharp rock that made his foot bleeding. The show's doctors quickly treated his foot to avoid infection. Betong and Maey now accepted the fact that KC, Stef and Mara have a strong alliance, so they told KC that if ever they were sent to the jury, they would vote for him to become the winner. Before Tribal Council, the castaways used the leftover paints from a previous activity to paint some words and pictures on their arms. At Tribal Council, talks turned to KC being a threat, now winning 6 out of 12 challenges since the merge. Voting then commenced, which led to Maey becoming the sixth jury member, and with Betong, becoming the last pair to be broken up, 3–2.

=== Cycle 12: Days 33-34 ===
- Immunity Challenge: On the sea, the castaways would balance themselves on a post composed of 4 planks. Over time, a plank would be removed one-by-one until what's left is the post. Whoever stays atop the longest would win immunity.

Night of Day 32: KC noticed Stef and Mara weren't giving some respect to Betong, who was still on emotions after his partner, Maey, was voted off.

Day 33: That morning, Betong made himself busy, not to think about Maey. They later headed to the challenge area early that morning. At the final Immunity Challenge, KC fell off first due to his large feet. Then, Stef came next, which left Mara and Betong still standing. They were also among the final four who have never won an individual challenge before. Then, Betong started to shake and fell off, which led to Mara winning the last challenge of the season, after 2 hours and 11 minutes. That night, KC, Mara and Stef decided to have a dare of running on the beach naked and dancing at Tribal Council if the three of them is announced to be on the top 3.

Day 34: KC, Mara and Stef practiced their dancing for the Tribal Council. Betong then talked to KC about voting off Stef with him; this would constitute to a tie and he can have a good fight against Stef in the tiebreaker fire-making challenge, to which KC responded in uncertainty. At Tribal Council, some jury members muttered to and signalled Stef and Mara to vote KC out, to which Mara also signaled Betong on who to vote. Richard noticed this with Gino, who demanded to stop it as it is unfair to the game. When the votes came, KC was blindsided and became the last member of the jury, 3–1. See Controversy.

=== Finale: Days 35-36 ===
Day 35: Even though KC wasn't part of the final three, the trio still decided to run on the beach naked, which KC had planned. Following Survivor tradition, the final 3 paid tribute to past and voted out castaways. They went on about how each fallen competitor has contributed to their journey towards the end. That night, a "Final 3" feast was prepared for them.

Day 36: Richard went to camp for the first and last time, telling the Final 3 that they will now leave the camp area for good, burning all that will be left in it. At the final Tribal Council, the final 3 were targeted by the mostly averse jury: Stef for mainly being a follower, Mara for being only a sidekick to Arnold, and Betong for incorporating pity into the game. After voting took place, following Survivor tradition, Richard picked up the voting urn and left the Tribal Council area.

Months later, in front of a live audience in Manila, Betong was proclaimed the Celebrity Sole Survivor by the jury, with a vote of 4-2-1 over Mara and Stef respectively. He was awarded a check worth three million pesos and this season's immunity necklace to symbolize the title.

== Voting history ==
Tribal Council (TC) numbers are almost the same as Cycle numbers as a Tribal Council occurs at the end of each cycle; eliminations that happen outside a Tribal Council do not bear a Tribal Council number, but count towards a cycle. Episode numbers denote the episode(s) when the voting and subsequent revelation of votes and elimination during a Tribal Council took place. They can also denote the episode wherein a contestant officially left the game for any reason.

	Original tribes		Swapped tribes				Shuffled tribes				Merged tribe						
Episode #	3	7	11	12	15		20			25	30	36	41	47	52	59	61
Day	2	4	6		8		12			15	18	21	23	26	28	32	34
Eliminated	Geneva	Alyssa & Aifha	Jackie & Angelicopter	Ellen & Filo	None (Note: Maribel, Chuckie and Isabel played their respective Immunity Bracelets, therefore all votes against them were not counted. As there were no counted ballots, all the castaways then forced to re-vote.)	Maribel	Tie (Note: The vote resulted in a tie. Per the rules, a second vote was held where the castaways involved in the tie would not vote and the remaining castaways could only vote for those who tied.)	Tie (Note: After two rounds of voting between Gino and Isabel, tribal council remained tied. As the two tied castaways would compete in a fire making challenge to resolve the tie.)	Isabel	Carlo	Chuckie	Arthur	John	Gino	Arnold	Maey	KC
Votes	Quit (Note: No vote; Geneva chose to quit the game. Her partner KC was given a chance by the production team to stay as a solo contestant.)	7–2	Quit (Note: No vote; Jackie and Angelicopter decided to quit the game.)	Quit (Note: No vote; Ellen and Filo decided to quit the game.)	0–0	6–1	3–3	2–2	Challenge (Note: Isabel lost to Gino on a fire making tiebreaker challenge.)	3–0 (Note: Arnold played an immunity bracelet on Stef, therefore three votes against her were not counted.)	9–1	6–3	4–2–1–1	4–2–1	4–2	3–2	3–1
Voter	Vote																
Betong					~~Maribel~~	Maribel	Gino	Gino			Chuckie	Mara	John	Gino	Arnold	Stef	KC
Mara		Alyssa & Aifha								Carlo	Chuckie	Arthur	KC	Gino	Stef	Maey	KC
Stef		Alyssa & Aifha								Carlo	Chuckie	Arthur	John	Arnold	Arnold	Maey	KC
KC		Alyssa & Aifha					Isabel	Isabel			Chuckie	Arthur	Mara	Mara	Arnold	Maey	Betong
Maey					~~Chuckie & Isabel~~	Maribel				~~Stef~~	Chuckie	Mara	John	Gino	Arnold	Stef	
Arnold		Alyssa & Aifha								Carlo	Chuckie	Arthur	KC	Gino	Stef		
Gino		Alyssa & Aifha					Isabel	None (Note: Gino and Isabel were not eligible to vote in the second round of voting.)	Win		Chuckie	Arthur	John	Mara			
John		Alyssa & Aifha					Isabel	Isabel			Chuckie	Arthur	Stef				
Arthur					~~Chuckie & Isabel~~	Maribel	Gino	Gino			Chuckie	Mara					
Chuckie					~~Maribel~~	Maribel				~~Stef~~	John						
Carlo					~~Chuckie & Isabel~~	Maribel				~~Stef~~							
Isabel					~~Maribel~~	Maribel	Gino	None	Lose								
Maribel		Alyssa & Aifha			~~Chuckie & Isabel~~	Arthur & Carlo											
Filo																	
Ellen																	
Angelicopter																	
Jackie																	
Aifha		Maribel & Mara															
Alyssa		Maribel & Mara															
Geneva																	

Jury vote
Episode #	64–65		
Day	36		
Finalist	Stef	Mara	Betong
Votes	4–2–1		
Juror	Vote		
KC			Betong
Maey			Betong
Arnold		Mara	
Gino	Stef		
John		Mara	
Arthur			Betong
Chuckie			Betong

== Controversy ==
=== "Cheating" incident ===
On the February 6 episode, a controversial Tribal Council had occurred. Maey and Gino, both jury members, signaled Mara, Stef and Betong to vote out KC. Later, KC Montero in Twitter revealed that it weren't only Maey and Gino who signaled, it was almost all of the jury members, but due to little time, only Maey and Gino were shown. According to the rules of Survivor, jury members are not allowed to speak or interact with the remaining castaways during a Tribal Council except on the Final Tribal Council. After the said episode, many viewers became dismayed about the incident and began posting their reactions in different social networking sites, such as Facebook and Twitter. Celebrities who did the same included KC's brother, Troy Montero, former castaways Marlon Carmen, Aubrey Miles, Solenn Heussaff and Michelle Madrigal, and Rhian Ramos, Maxene Magalona and Denise Laurel. Based on the previous episodes, Betong was intended to be voted out and the jury had influenced Mara, Stef and Betong to change their votes. Both Mara and Stef intended to vote out Betong, while the latter would vote out Stef. After the live finale, where the supposedly eliminated Betong ultimately won, Rappler interviewed a GMA Network representative about the incident and answered that they consulted with the representatives of the "international Survivor franchise", which was probably the Castaway Television Productions, and they were advised to just continue the game. This decision was also revealed on the reunion special of this season on February 19, 2012.
