= Laff Camera Action =

2016 Philippine television game show

- Title card
- Genre: Game show; Comedy
- Presented by: Betong Sumaya; Sheena Halili
- Judges: Sef Cadayona; Gladys Guevarra; Caesar Cosme
- Country of origin: Philippines
- Original language: Tagalog
- No. of episodes: 14

Production
- Production locations: GMA Network Center, Quezon City, Philippines
- Camera setup: Multiple-camera setup
- Running time: 30–45 minutes
- Production company: GMA Entertainment TV

Original release
- Network: GMA Network
- Release: May 28 – August 27, 2016

Laff Camera Action is a 2016 Philippine television comedy game show broadcast by GMA Network. Hosted by Betong Sumaya and Sheena Halili, it premiered on May 28, 2016 on the network's Sabado Star Power sa Hapon line up. Sef Cadayona, Gladys Guevarra and Caesar Cosme served as the members of "MapanghusGang". The show concluded on August 27, 2016, with a total of 14 episodes.

The show is streaming online on YouTube.

== Overview ==
A 60-minute improvisational comedy game show where performances are unscripted, unrehearsed, and spontaneous. Two groups of three celebrities or comedians will compete in three rounds as they tackle various improvisational scenarios. A guest is also invited to perform with the competing groups.

== Gameplay ==
In the game proper, two sets of groups with three contestants will compete. They will play an unscripted, unrehearsed, and spontaneous comedic role play with different scenes given by various ComeDirectors each week. At the end of the show, the MapanghusGang will give comments regarding to their performance and will decide who will be the winner of the week.

In round one, the contestants do a roleplay with a scene given to them by the selected "ComeDirector" of the week. The two groups have a different set of scenes and props that will help them make their roleplay more pretentious.

In round two, the contestants should give most of their efforts to make their performance even more pretentious. They can still differ about the scene. They won't have props and there's a guest performer known as the "ContraDiva" or "ContraBibo".

In round three, the last and most difficult. Firstly, they will use same scenes and props. The other group would be in the isolation room so that they couldn't spy the other group's performance.

The best performer will get 10,000 Philippine pesos. The Grand Winner will get 75,000 Philippine pesos in cash and a "L.C.A. trophy". For a defending champion, when their team won for three consecutive times, they would get a star that would be placed in the "Wall of Fame".

== Hosts ==
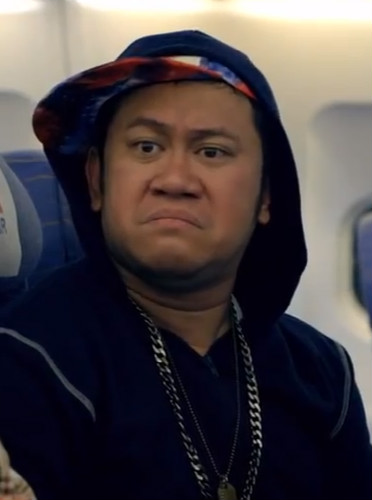
Betong Sumaya served as a host.

- Betong Sumaya
- Sheena Halili
- Arianne Bautista

MapanghusGang

- Sef Cadayona
- Gladys Guevarra
- Caesar Cosme

== Ratings ==
According to AGB Nielsen Philippines' Mega Manila household television ratings, the pilot episode of Laff, Camera, Action! earned a 12.3% rating. The final episode scored an 11.5 rating in Urban Luzon television ratings.

== Accolades ==
Accolades received by Laff Camera Action
Year	Award	Category	Recipient	Result	Ref.
2016	30th PMPC Star Awards for Television	Best Game Show	Laff Camera Action	Nominated	
2016	30th PMPC Star Awards for Television	Best Game Show Host	Betong Sumaya Sheena Halili	Nominated	
