= Janna Dominguez =

Filipino actress

- Born: Jamie Ann Quisumbing Angeles; March 11, 1990 (age 36); Malabon, Philippines
- Occupations: Actress; host; comedian
- Years active: 2007–present
- Agents: Star Magic (2007–2010); GMA Network (2010–present)
- Known for: Maria in Pepito Manaloto
- Partner: Mickey Ablan
- Children: 4

Jamie Ann Quisumbing Angeles (born March 11, 1990) professionally known as Janna Dominguez, is a Filipino actress. She is best known for portraying the role of Maria in Pepito Manaloto (2010–present).

== Career ==
Dominguez began her career in the entertainment industry as one of the co-hosts of Wowowee (2005). She later joined the reality television show Pinoy Fear Factor (2008), as a contestant.

Dominguez was previously a member of ABS-CBN's talent management arm, Star Magic. She later chose not to renew her contract, opting instead to pursue projects with GMA Network. She initially pursued a career as a freelance actress but later signed an exclusive contract with GMA Network in 2010. That same year, she became a regular host and performer on I Laugh Sabado, which aired on the network's sister channel, Q. Dominguez also served as the guest co-host of Take Me Out. The same year, she joined the ensemble cast of Pepito Manaloto as Maria, one of the Manaloto family's resident housemaids. She quickly became recognizable, owing to her exposure in the sitcom.

Dominguez also joined the cast of Endless Love. She supposed to star in a Sine Novela installment Bakit Kay Tagal ng Sandali?, but it was shelved.

== Personal life ==
Janna Dominguez has four children with her partner martial arts fighter, Mickey Ablan: Yzabel, Micael, Juliann Gabriel, and Michael Zab Leon. Their eldest child, Yzabel, died aged 20 on October 7, 2023, due to heart failure and lung infection, the same day their fourth child Leon was born.

== Filmography ==
=== Film ===
Year	Title	Role	Ref.
2009	And I Love You So	Teresa "Esha"	
2009	I Love You, Goodbye	Connie	
2015	All You Need Is Pag-Ibig	Cristy	
2015	Turo Turo		

=== Television ===
Year	Title	Role	Note(s)	Ref.
2007	Wowowee	Herself (guest)		
2009	Pinoy Fear Factor	Herself (contestant)	Runner-up	
2009	Eva Fonda	Paris		
2009	Parekoy	Ligaya		
2009	Banana Split	Herself (guest)		
2009	Precious Hearts Romances Presents	Artemis "Tammy" Macapugay	Episode: "Bud Brothers"	
2010	I Laugh Sabado	Herself (guest)		
2010	SRO Cinemaserye	Myrna	Episode: "Hot Mama"	
2010	Party Pilipinas	Herself (performer)		
2010	Take Me Out	Herself (co-host)		
2010	First Time	Elizabeth		
2010	Endless Love	Mylene		
2010	Bantatay	Cat girl #2		
2010–present	Pepito Manaloto	Maria		
2011	Beauty Queen	Amor		
2011	May Tamang Balita	Herself (Mock Weather Anchor)		
2011	Nita Negrita	Unknown (guest appearance)		
2015	Karelasyon	Herself (various roles)	Episode role	
2015	Dangwa	Herself (various roles)	Episode role	
2015	Sabado Badoo	Herself (guest)		
2016	Dear Uge	Herself	Episode role	
2016	That's My Amboy	Christine		
2016	Hahamakin ang Lahat	Lilybeth		
2017	Pinulot Ka Lang sa Lupa	Chona		
2017	Haplos	Estonia		
2018	Maynila	Herself (various roles)	Episode role	
2019	Daig Kayo ng Lola Ko	Herself (various roles)	Episode role	
2019	Daddy's Gurl			
2020	Tadhana	Herself (various roles)	Episode role	
2022	Regal Studio Presents	Herself (various roles)	Episode role	
2026	Rainbow Rumble	Herself (contestant)		
