= List of A1 Ko Sa 'Yo episodes =

Episodes of 2016 Philippine sitcom series broadcast by GMA Network

A1 Ko Sa 'Yo is a 2016 Philippine situational comedy series broadcast by GMA Network. The series premiered on the network's Telebabad evening block and worldwide on GMA Pinoy TV every Thursday from June 2, 2016 to November 24, 2016, replacing the Thursday slot of Love Me, Heal Me.

== Series overview ==
Season	Episodes	Originally released	
Season	Episodes	First released	Last released
1	26	June 2, 2016	November 24, 2016

== Episodes ==
No. overall	No. in season	Title	Original air date	Social media hashtag	AGB Nielsen Mega Manila		Prod. Code	Ref.
No. overall	No. in season	Title	Original air date	Social media hashtag	Audience share	Timeslot rank	Prod. Code	Ref.
1	1	"Pilot"	June 2, 2016	#A1KoSayo	15.7%	#1	101 - A	
2	2	"Nawawalang Bikini"	June 9, 2016	#A1NawawalangBikini	15.7%	#1	102 - B	
3	3	"He or She"	June 16, 2016	#A1HeOrShe	12.9%	#1	105 - E	
4	4	"Digna's Birthday"	June 23, 2016	#A1KoSayo	12.4%	#1	103 - C	
5	5	"Biggest Fear"	June 30, 2016	#A1BiggestFear	12.5%	#1	104 - D	
					AGB Nielsen NUTAM		Prod. Code	Ref.
6	6	"True to Yourself"	July 7, 2016	#A1TrueToYourself	10.8%	#1	106 - F	
7	7	"Not All We Need Is Love"	July 14, 2016	#A1NotAllWeNeedIsLove	10.4%	#1	107 - G	
8	8	"DOM"	July 21, 2016	#A1DOM	10.7%	#1	108 - H	
9	9	"Video Scandal"	July 28, 2016	#A1VideoScandal	9.8%	#1	110 - J	
10	10	"I Misjudged You"	August 4, 2016	#A1IMisjudgedYou	9.5%	#2	111 - K	
11	11	"May Tatlong Baby"	August 11, 2016	#A1MayTatlongBaby	10.2%	#1	109 - I	
12	12	"TV Shopping"	August 18, 2016	#A1TVShopping	11.6%	#1	112 - L	
13	13	"Popularity and Acceptance"	August 25, 2016	#A1PopularityAndAcceptance	10.0%	#2	114 - N	
14	14	"Wet and Wild"	September 1, 2016	#A1WetAndWild	10.0%	#2	113 - M	
15	15	"Online"	September 8, 2016	#A1Online	8.9%	#2	120 - T	
16	16	"House Party"	September 15, 2016	#A1HouseParty	9.1%	#2	116 - P	
17	17	"Kapaan"	September 22, 2016	#A1Kapaan	9.2%	#2	117 - Q	
18	18	"Challenge Accepted"	September 29, 2016	#A1ChallengeAccepted	9.4%	#2	118 - R	
19	19	"Big Reveal"	October 6, 2016	#A1BigReveal	9.5%	#2	115 - O	
20	20	"Ex Factor"	October 13, 2016	#A1ExFactor	10.3%	#2	119 - S	
21	21	"BiGuel"	October 20, 2016	#A1BiGuel	11.2%	#1	122 - V	
22	22	"Katakot"	October 27, 2016	#A1Katakot	11.1%	#2	121 - U	
23	23	"Playhouse"	November 3, 2016	#A1Playhouse	10.7%	#1	123 - W	
24	24	"LQ"	November 10, 2016	#A1LQ	10.6%	#1	125 - Y	
25	25	"Emo"	November 17, 2016	#A1Emo	10.2%	#1	124 - X	
26	26	"Thank You"	November 24, 2016	#A1ThankYou	8.5%	#2	126 - Z	
