= Betong Sumaya =

Filipino comedian and actor (born 1975)

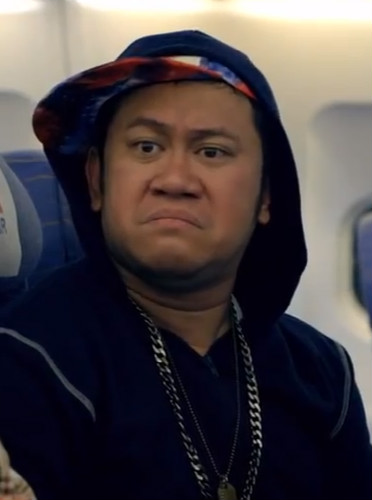
- Sumaya in Shake, Rattle & Roll XV
- Born: Alberto Sermonia Sumaya Jr. November 21, 1975 (age 50); Antipolo, Rizal, Philippines

Comedy career
- Years active: 1996–present
- Medium: Television
- Genre: Observational comedy

Alberto "Betong" Sermonia Sumaya Jr. (born November 21, 1975) is a Filipino comedian, actor, and former production assistant for GMA Network, where he is also a part of the network's talent agency. Sumaya participated in the GMA reality show Survivor Philippines: Celebrity Doubles Showdown (2011), and became the eventual victor. He appears in GMA's longtime-running gag show Bubble Gang. Sumaya became one of the presenters of the longest running noontime show in the Philippines, Eat Bulaga! (later Tahanang Pinakamasaya!) in 2023.

== Career ==
Born and raised in Antipolo; he graduated with a Bachelor of Arts degree in Filipino and a minor in mass communication from the Polytechnic University of the Philippines. He joined the Probe Team as a production assistant and rose to ranks as an executive producer for several GMA News and Public Affairs programs. Sumaya reprised his role as Antonietta in various GMA TV shows such as CelebriTV, Celebrity Bluff and Wowowin; with Boobay and Donita Nose.

=== Survivor Philippines: Celebrity Doubles Showdown ===
Sumaya was named as the second Celebrity Sole Survivor in the season, Survivor Philippines: Celebrity Doubles Showdown. The live announcement was held at the GMA Network Studio hosted by Richard Gutierrez on February 10. Betong made it to the Top 3 along with fellow castaways, Mara Yokohama and Stef Prescott.

=== Eat Bulaga! ===
In 2023, after Tito Sotto, Vic Sotto, and Joey De Leon (also known as TVJ) along with their co-hosts resigned due to a dispute with TAPE Inc. on May 31, Sumaya was tapped as one of the new hosts of the newly recreated Eat Bulaga! when the show returned live on June 5.

== Filmography ==
=== Film ===
Year	Title	Role
2012	Just One Summer	Beto's Barkada
2012	Boy Pick-Up: The Movie	Bogart
2012	Of All the Things	
2013	My Lady Boss	Sponky
2013	Ang Huling Henya	Zombie
2014	Basement	Bernard
2014	Shake, Rattle & Roll XV	Macky
2016	I Love You to Death	Jerry
2017	Haunted Forest	
2019	Taran Tanods	
2025	Samahan ng mga Makasalanan	Mayor Damonyo/Tonyong Scammer

=== Television ===
Year	Title	Role
1996–2003	The Probe Team	Himself / Supervising Producer
2003–2004	Kay Susan Tayo!	Himself / Segment Host
2004–2005	Lakas Magsasaka	Himself / Host
2005	Lovely Day	Himself
2009	Survivor Philippines: Palau – Reunion Special; Surbayboy Philippines: Palau	Tara
2009–2010	The Beat	Himself / Segment Host
2009–2010	Full Time Moms	Himself
2010	Happy Land	Himself
2010	Maynila	Various
2010	Day Off	Himself
2010	Eateria	Himself / Segment Host
2010	Sunnyville	Himself / Host
2011	AHA!	Himself / Segment Host
2011	Unang Hirit	Himself / Segment Host
2011	Ang Pinaka	Himself / Host
2011–2012	Survivor Philippines: Celebrity Doubles Showdown	Himself / Castaway / Sole Survivor
2012	Eat Bulaga	Himself / Performer
2012	May Tamang Balita	Himself / Host
2012	Party Pilipinas	Himself / Performer
2012	Survivor Philippines: Celebrity Doubles Showdown; Reunion Special	Himself
2012	Tunay na Buhay	Himself
2012	Spooky Valentine: Manikurista	Curie Manikurista
2012	Bubble Gang	Himself / Mainstay
2012	Wish Ko Lang	Himself
2012	Manny Many Prizes	Himself / Co-Host
2012	Chef Boy Logro: Kusina Master	Himself / Special Guest
2012	Travel More Fun in the Philippines	Himself / Host
2012	Spooky Nights Presents: Korona	
2012	Tweets for My Sweet	Justin B.
2012	Celebrity Bluff	Himself / Celebrity Contestant
2012–2017	Pepito Manaloto: Ang Tunay na Kwento	Benny De Guzman
2012–2013	Go Negosyo	Himself / Guest Host
2013	Bayan Ko	Various
2013	Genesis	Lito 'Tolits' Dimagiba
2013	Vampire ang Daddy Ko	Julio
2014	Magpakailanman: The Boy Logro Story	Young Pablo "Boy" Logro
2014	Don't Lose The Money	Himself / Contestant
2015	Once Upon a Kiss	Sebastian Poblador
2015	Sabado Badoo	Himself / Host
2015	Kris TV	Himself / Cameo
2015	Alamat: Ang Langgam at ang Tipaklong	Tony Tipaklong
2015	The Ryzza Mae Show	Himself / Guest
2015	ASOP: A Song of Praise Season 4	Himself / Finalist
2015–2016	Because of You	Albert
2015	Dangwa	Antonietta
2016	Celebrity Bluff	Bluffer (as Antonietta)
2016	Juan Tamad	Tatang Albularyo
2016	Dear Uge	Antonietta
2016	Lip Sync Battle Philippines	Himself / Celebrity Contestant Performer
2016	Laff, Camera, Action!	Himself / Host
2016	Conan, My Beautician	Mimi
2016	Tsuperhero	Julius
2017	I Heart Davao	Patrick "Tasoy" Alcancez
2017	Road Trip	Himself / Guest
2017	All-Star Videoke	Himself / Host
2018	Haplos	Julius
2018	Inday Will Always Love You	Madam Britney
2018	Studio 7	Himself / Guest Performer
2018	Daig Kayo ng Lola Ko	Mokong
2019	Sunday PinaSaya	Himself / Guest Performer
2019–2020	The Gift	Asi
2020–2023	All-Out Sundays	Himself / Co-host / Various roles
2020–2021	Centerstage	Himself / co-host
2021	Mars Pa More	Himself / Guest
2021	Tadhana	Various
2022	Agimat ng Agila	Art de Mesa
2022	TOLS	Tuks Bayagbag
2022	TiktoClock	Himself / Celebrity Judge / Substitute host for Kim Atienza
2023	Abot-Kamay na Pangarap	Obet Villarin
2023–2024	Eat Bulaga!	Himself / Host
2024	Tahanang Pinakamasaya!	Himself / Host
2025	Prinsesa ng City Jail	Policarpio "Pusoy" Vivero

=== TV specials ===
Year	Title	Role
2010	GMA @ 60: The Heart Of Television	Himself
2010	Bubble Gang 15th Anniversary Special	Himself
2011	Party Pilipinas Anniversary Special	Himself
2012	Survivor Philippines Celebrity Challenge	Himself / Winner
2012	34th Catholic Mass Media Awards	Himself / Presenter
2013	27th PMPC Star Awards for TV	Himself / Cameo
2013	35th Catholic Mass Media Awards	Himself / Presenter
2014	28th PMPC Star Awards for TV	Himself / Cameo
2015	Countdown To 2015: The GMA New Year Countdown Special	Himself / co-host / Performer
2015	Thank You Kapuso: GMA Fans Day 2015: The GMA 65th Anniversary TV Special	Himself / co-host / Performer
2015	ASOP Season 4 Grand Finals Night	Himself / Guest / Performer
2015	IMBG: Bubble Gang 20th Anniversary Documentary Special	Himself
2016	Countdown to 2016: The GMA New Year Special	Himself
2016	Master Showman's Final Bow	Himself
2016	21 Gang Salute: Bubble Gang 21st Anniversary Special	Himself
2016	Magic of Christmas: The 2016 GMA Christmas Special	Himself
2017	Lipad Sa 2017: The 2017 GMA New Year Countdown Special	Host / Himself
2017	Bubble Gang Parokya Bente Dos: Bubble Gang 22nd Anniversary Musical Stage Play Special	Himself / Performer
2018	Countdown To 2018: The Kapuso New Year Countdown	Host / Himself
2018	Bente Tres Oras: Bubble Gang 23nd Anniversary Telemovie Special	Himself / Performer
2019	Countdown To 2019: The Kapuso New Year Countdown	Himself / Host
2019	Shopee 11.11 Big Christmas TV Special	Himself / Performer
2019	The Scavengers: Bubble Gang 24th Anniversary Telemovie Special	Hulkluban (a parody of The Incredible Hulk and a play on the word hukluban which means a senile or weak person)
2020	Countdown To 2020: The Kapuso New Year Countdown	Himself / Host
2021	Himself/Host	Himself / Host
2025	Himself / Host	
2025	Himself / Co Host	

== Awards and recognitions ==
Year	Organization	Award	Result
2012	Survivor Philippines: Celebrity Doubles Showdown	Celebrity Sole Survivor	Won
2012	Celebrity Bluff	500,000 Pesos	Won
