= I Laugh Sabado =

Philippine television variety show

- Title card
- Genre: Variety show
- Directed by: Bibeth Orteza
- Presented by: Wally Bayola
- Opening theme: "I Love You Sabado" by The Bloomfields
- Country of origin: Philippines
- Original language: Tagalog

Production
- Camera setup: Multiple-camera setup
- Running time: 60 minutes

Original release
- Network: Q
- Release: April 24, 2010 – February 19, 2011

I Laugh Sabado (transl. I laugh Saturday) is a Philippine television variety show broadcast by Q. Directed by Bibeth Orteza, it premiered on April 24, 2010. The show concluded on February 19, 2011.

== Overview ==
I Laugh Sabado was a comedy variety show of Q, which featured sketches and musical numbers. It was hosted by an ensemble of Filipino comedians and character actors, Wally Bayola, Paolo Paraiso, Gee Canlas, Jana Dominguez, Jan Manual, Alfred Marquez, and Archie Alemania. It was directed by Bibeth Orteza.

The show, admits Paolo, is patterned after the long-running US show, Saturday Night Live. I Laugh Sabado will have gags, sketches, skits and a knock-knock portion. We have a celebrity guest every week who will serve as the show's host. There will also be a band and dancers."

== Cast ==
- Wally Bayola
- Paolo Paraiso
- Janna Dominguez
- Gee Canlas
- Jan Manual
- Archie Alemania
- XLR8
