= Alamat (TV program) =

Philippine television drama series

- Title card
- Genre: Fantasy drama
- Created by: Jeffrey John Imutan
- Directed by: Jeffrey John Imutan
- Composers: Ann Margaret Figueroa; Joshua Gapasin; Lev Calvo; Neil Marvin Chua; Andrew Florentino; Roxxane Fabian; Adriane Louies M. Macalipay
- Country of origin: Philippines
- Original language: Tagalog
- No. of seasons: 2
- No. of episodes: 12

Production
- Executive producers: Majorie Mosura Dumont; Julius Ian Pacheco
- Production locations: Quezon City, Philippines
- Camera setup: Multiple-camera setup
- Running time: 15–20 minutes
- Production companies: GMA News and Public Affairs; GMA Post Production; Red Door Animation, Inc.; Magic Tree Multimedia

Original release
- Network: GMA Network
- Release: July 12, 2015 – June 19, 2016

Alamat (transl. folklore) is a Philippine television drama fantasy anthology series broadcast by GMA Network. It premiered on July 12, 2015. The series concluded on June 19, 2016, with a total of two seasons and 12 episodes.

The series is streaming online on YouTube.

== Overview ==
The first season was directed by Jeffrey John Imutan and features the voices of Pen Medina, Mike Tan, Louise delos Reyes, Tonipet Gaba, Betong Sumaya, Kylie Padilla, Pekto, John Feir, Glaiza de Castro, Gabby Eigenmann, Jeric Gonzales, Bea Binene and Roi Vinzon.

In February 2016, it was announced that it would return for a second season. Jeffrey John Imutan returned as director. Season two's voice actors included Leo Martinez, RJ Padilla, Bianca Umali, Love Añover, Miggs Cuaderno, John Feir, LJ Reyes, Benjamin Alves, Frencheska Farr, Rafa Siguion-Reyna, Tonipet Gaba, and Zymic Jaranilla. It premiered on May 15, 2016.

== Ratings ==
According to AGB Nielsen Philippines' Mega Manila household television ratings, the pilot episode of Alamat earned a 16.2% rating. The final episode scored a 15.4% rating.

== Accolades ==
Accolades received by Alamat
Year	Award	Category	Recipient	Result	Ref.
2015	Anak TV Seal Awards		Alamat	Won	
2016	US International Film and Video Festival	Best of Festival Award	Alamat	Won	
2016	US International Film and Video Festival	Gold Camera Award in the Entertainment: Children category	"Alamat ng Bayabas (transl. The Legend of the Guava)"	Won	
