= A1 Ko Sa'yo =

2016 Philippine television sitcom series

- Title card
- Also known as: You're My A1
- Genre: Sitcom
- Written by: Chito Francisco; Mcoy Fundales; Manny Pavia; Mark Sakay
- Directed by: Randy Santiago
- Creative director: Caesar Cosme
- Starring: Jaclyn Jose; Solenn Heussaff; Gardo Versoza
- Theme music composer: Mcoy Fundales
- Opening theme: "Ewan Ko sa 'Yo" by Denise Barbacena and Mcoy Fundales
- Country of origin: Philippines
- Original language: Tagalog
- No. of episodes: 26 (list of episodes)

Production
- Executive producer: Mayee Fabregas
- Production locations: Quezon City, Philippines
- Editors: Edwin Thaddeus Borja; Mark Anthony Valderrama
- Camera setup: Multiple-camera setup
- Running time: 33–41 minutes
- Production company: GMA Entertainment TV

Original release
- Network: GMA Network
- Release: June 2 – November 24, 2016

A1 Ko Sa'yo (transl. I don't know about you / international title: You're My A1) is a 2016 Philippine television sitcom series broadcast by GMA Network. Directed by Randy Santiago, it stars Jaclyn Jose, Gardo Versoza and Solenn Heussaff. It premiered on June 2, 2016, on the network's Telebabad line up. The series concluded on November 24, 2016, with a total of 26 episodes.

The series is streaming online on YouTube.

== Premise ==
Digna, a beauty pageant aspirant is in search of her perfect beauty queen as she manages A1 Talent Agency. She is married to Rolly, a marriage counselor, who always fails to give her romance which in turn makes her uptight and short tempered when facing her talents.

== Cast and characters ==
Cast

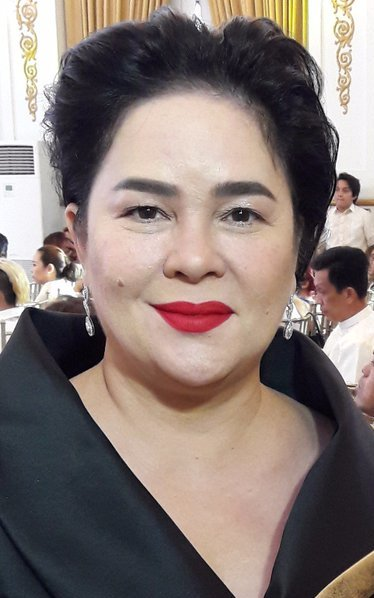
Jaclyn Jose

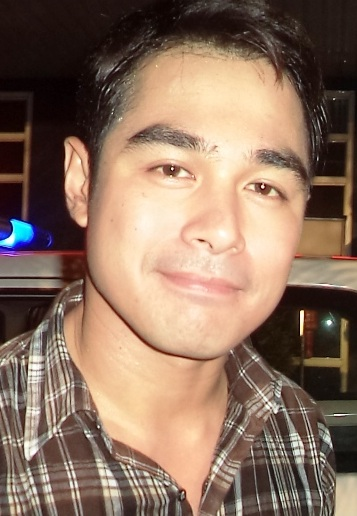
Benjamin Alves

Lead cast

- Jaclyn Jose as Digna Molina
- Solenn Heussaff as Miley
- Gardo Versoza as Rolando "Rolly" Molina

Supporting cast

- Sef Cadayona as Enzo
- Benjamin Alves as Jay
- Roi Vinzon as Primo
- Ervic Vijandre as Erroll
- Denise Barbacena as Kaycee Molina
- Gee Canlas as Tintin
- Mara Alberto as Kath

== Ratings ==
According to AGB Nielsen Philippines' Mega Manila household television ratings, the pilot episode of A1 Ko Sa'yo earned a 15.7% rating. The final episode scored an 8.5% rating in Urban Luzon.

== Accolades ==
Accolades received by A1 Ko Sa'yo
Year	Award	Category	Recipient	Result	Ref.
2016	30th PMPC Star Awards for Television	Best Comedy Program	A1 Ko Sa'yo	Nominated	
