= Pepito Manaloto: Tuloy ang Kuwento =

Philippine television sitcom series

- Title card since 2022
- Also known as: Pepito Manaloto; Pepito Manaloto: Ang Tunay na Kuwento; Pepito Manaloto: Kuwento Kuwento; Pepito Manaloto: Ang Unang Kuwento
- Genre: Sitcom
- Created by: Michael V.
- Directed by: Bert De Leon; Michael V.
- Creative director: Michael V.
- Starring: Michael V.; Sef Cadayona
- Theme music composer: Albert Tamayo
- Ending theme: "Pepito Manaloto" by Michael V.; "Unang Kuwento" by Michael V.
- Composer: Michael V.
- Country of origin: Philippines
- Original language: Tagalog

Production
- Executive producer: Cathy Soriano
- Camera setup: Multiple-camera setup
- Running time: 35–43 minutes
- Production company: GMA Entertainment Group

Original release
- Network: GMA Network
- Release: March 28, 2010 – present

Pepito Manaloto: Tuloy ang Kuwento (transl. Pepito Manaloto: the story continues) formerly known as Pepito Manaloto, Pepito Manaloto: Ang Tunay na Kuwento (transl. Pepito Manaloto: The Real Story), Pepito Manoloto: Kuwento Kuwento (transl. Pepito Manaloto: Stories) and Pepito Manaloto: Ang Unang Kuwento (transl. Pepito Manaloto: The First Story), is a Philippine television sitcom series broadcast by GMA Network. Directed by Michael V., it stars Michael V. and Sef Cadayona both in the title role. It premiered on March 28, 2010, as Pepito Manaloto on the network's Sunday night line up.

It was relaunched on September 16, 2012, as Pepito Manoloto: Ang Tunay na Kuwento. On October 17, 2020, it was relaunched as Pepito Manaloto: Kuwento Kuwento, and concluded on May 29, 2021. A prequel series, Pepito Manaloto: Ang Unang Kuwento premiered on July 17, 2021, and concluded on June 4, 2022. Pepito Manaloto: Tuloy ang Kuwento, started airing on June 11, 2022. It featured the return of the original cast. It is the longest running sitcom series of GMA Network.

The series was released on DVD by GMA Home Video. It is streaming online on YouTube.

== Premise ==
The show follows the life of Pepito Manoloto, who was blessed and won the lottery. Along with him are his wife Elsa; their son and daughter, Chito and Clarissa; Pepito's best friend Patrick; their employees, Maria, Robert and Baby; and their neighbors, Tommy, Deedee and Mimi.

== Cast and characters ==
Cast

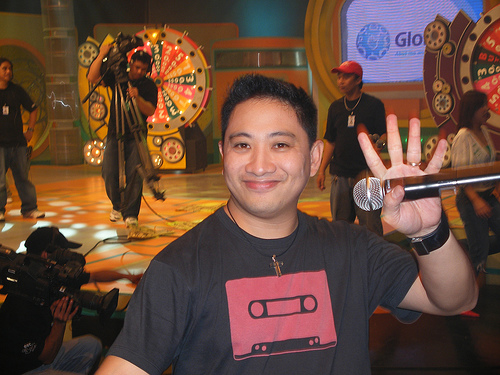
Michael V.

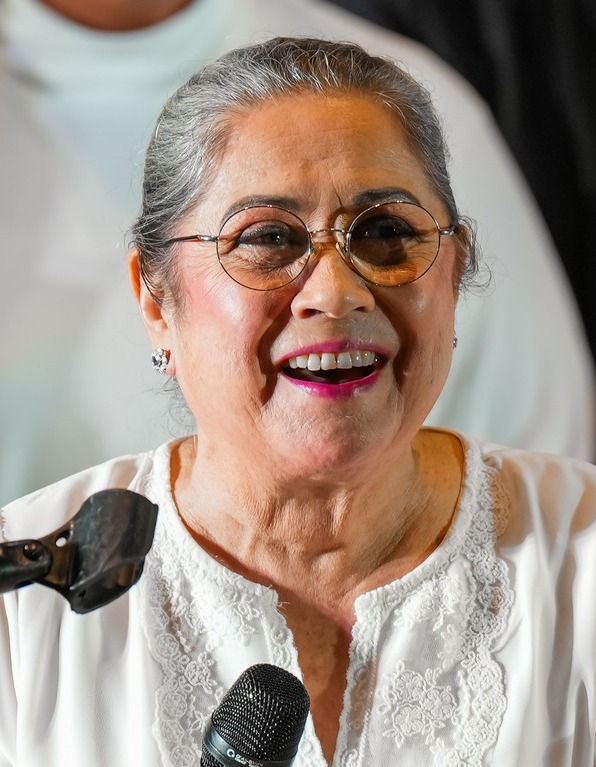
Nova Villa

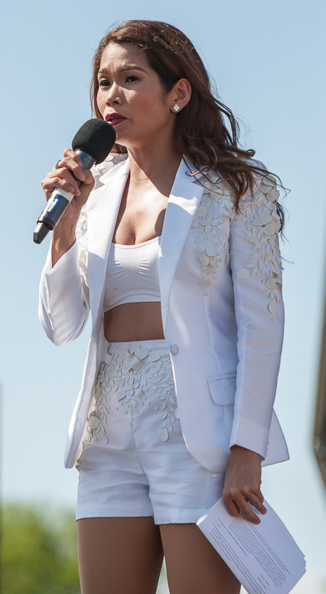
Pokwang

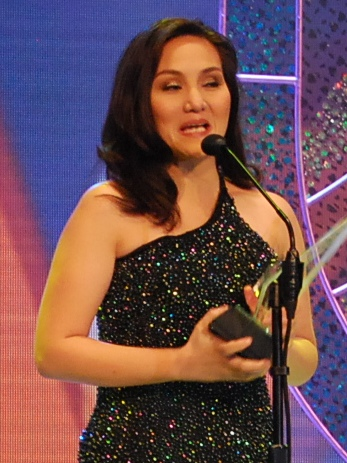
Gladys Reyes

Lead cast

- Michael V. as Pepito "Pitoy" Manaloto

Supporting cast

- Manilyn Reynes as Elsa dela Cruz-Manaloto
- Jake Vargas as Luisito "Chito" dela Cruz Manaloto / Michael "Jordan" Castillo
- Angel Satsumi as Clarissa dela Cruz Manaloto
- John Feir as Patricio "Patrick" Generoso
- Ronnie Henares as Tomas "Tommy" Diones
- Arthur Solinap as Robert "Bert / Junior" Maceda
- Mosang as Bettina "Baby" Reyes-Lopez
- Janna Dominguez as Maria Bagtikan-Cruz
- Nova Villa as Mimi Kho
- Jen Rosendahl as Roberta "Berta" Santos
- Chariz Solomon as Janice San Diego-Generoso
- Maureen Larrazabal as Mariano "Mara" Quijanos
- Toni Lopena as Vincent Bautista
- Cherry Malvar as Theresa "Tere" Dalisay
- Sophia Senoron as Cara
- Mikoy Morales as Rosauro "Roxy" Ocampo
- Jak Roberto as Erik
- Robb Ginto as Vanessa

Former cast

- Carmina Villarroel as Maricar Del Valle
- Jessa Zaragoza as Deedee Kho
- Julie Anne San Jose as Nicollete "Nikki" Villamil
- Barbie Forteza as Katkat
- Joshua Pineda as younger Chito Manaloto (season 1)
- Joshua Dionisio as Richard Reyes (season 1)
- Freddie Webb as Freddie Del Valle (season 1) and Roger Palmo (season 2)
- Bayani Agbayani as Brando (season 1)
- Lexi Fernandez and Bea Binene as Stephanie / Erika (season 1–2)
- Sef Cadayona as Pepito "Pitoy" Manaloto (2021–22)
- Mikee Quintos as Elsa dela Cruz-Manaloto (2021–22)
- Pokwang as Tarsing Batumbakal (2021–22)
- Kokoy de Santos as Patricio "Patrick" Generoso (2021–22)
- Gladys Reyes as Rosa Generoso (2021–22)
- Archie Alemania as Benito "Benny" Manaloto (2021–22)
- Edgar Allan Guzman as Fernando "Nando" Generoso (2021–22)
- Kristoffer Martin as Wendell (2021–22)
- Jay Arcilla as Eric (2021–22)
- Denise Barbacena as Elma (2021–22)
- Angel Guardian as Beth (2021–22)
- Gabby Eigenmann as Tomas "Tommy" Diones (2021–22)

== Production ==
Principal photography was halted in March 2020 due to the enhanced community quarantine in Luzon caused by the COVID-19 pandemic. The show resumed its programming on September 5, 2020. Principal photography for Pepito Manaloto: Ang Unang Kuwento commenced in June 2021.

== Ratings ==
According to AGB Nielsen Philippines' Mega Manila household television ratings, the pilot episode of Pepito Manaloto earned a 28.2% rating. The first episode of the show as Pepito Manaloto: Ang Tunay na Kuwento scored a 26.6% rating. The pilot episode of Pepito Manaloto: Ang Unang Kuwento a 14.7% rating from Nationwide Urban Television Audience Measurement.

== Accolades ==
Accolades received by Pepito Manaloto
Year	Award	Category	Recipient	Result	Ref.
2010	FMTM Awards	Best Weekend Series	Pepito Manaloto	Won	
2010	FMTM Awards	Best Comedy / Musical Series	Pepito Manaloto	Won	
2010	FMTM Awards	Best Musical / Comedy Lead Actress	Manilyn Reynes	Won	
2010	24th PMPC Star Awards for Television	Best Comedy Program	Pepito Manaloto	Nominated	
2011	33rd Catholic Mass Media Awards	Best Comedy Show	Pepito Manaloto	Won	
2011	Golden Screen TV Awards	Outstanding Comedy Program	Pepito Manaloto	Won	
2011	Golden Screen TV Awards	Outstanding Supporting Actor in a Gag or Comedy Program	John Feir	Nominated	
2011	Golden Screen TV Awards	Outstanding Supporting Actress in a Gag or Comedy Show	Mosang	Nominated	
2011	Golden Screen TV Awards	Outstanding Performance by an Actress in a Gag or Comedy Program	Manilyn Reynes	Nominated	
2011	FMTM Awards	Top TV Series Senior Artists	Michael V.	Top 9	
2011	PIRA Awards	Special Award for Insurance Education	Pepito Manaloto	Won	
2011	25th PMPC Star Awards for Television	Best Comedy Program	Pepito Manaloto	Won	
2012	17th Asian Television Awards	Best Comedy Performance by an Actor / Actress	Michael V.	Nominated	
2012	FMTM Awards	Best Supporting Actor in a Comedy / Sitcom / Gag Program	John Feir	Won	
2012	FMTM Awards	Best Supporting Actress in a Comedy / Sitcom / Gag Program	Nova Villa	Won	
2012	26th PMPC Star Awards for Television	Best Comedy Program	Pepito Manaloto	Nominated	
2012	26th PMPC Star Awards for Television	Best Comedy Actor	Michael V.	Nominated	
2012	26th PMPC Star Awards for Television	Best Comedy Actress	Manilyn Reynes	Nominated	
2012	USTv Awards	Best Situational Comedy	Pepito Manaloto	Won	

Accolades received by Pepito Manaloto: Ang Tunay na Kuwento
Year	Award	Category	Recipient	Result	Ref.
2013	35th Catholic Mass Media Awards	Best Comedy Program	Pepito Manaloto: Ang Tunay na Kuwento	Won	
2013	Golden Screen TV Awards	Outstanding Comedy Program	Pepito Manaloto: Ang Tunay na Kuwento	Won	
2013	Golden Screen TV Awards	Outstanding Supporting Actor in a Gag or Comedy Program	John Feir	Won	
2013	Golden Screen TV Awards	Outstanding Supporting Actress in a Gag or Comedy Show	Mosang	Nominated	
2013	27th PMPC Star Awards for Television	Best Comedy Program	Pepito Manaloto: Ang Tunay na Kuwento	Won	
2013	27th PMPC Star Awards for Television	Best Comedy Actor	Michael V.	Won	
2013	27th PMPC Star Awards for Television	Best Comedy Actress	Manilyn Reynes	Nominated	
2013	USTv Awards	Best Situational Comedy	Pepito Manaloto: Ang Tunay na Kuwento	Won	
2014	36th Catholic Mass Media Awards	Best Comedy Program	Pepito Manaloto: Ang Tunay na Kuwento	Won	
2014	Golden Screen TV Awards	Outstanding Comedy Program	Pepito Manaloto: Ang Tunay na Kuwento	Won	
2014	Golden Screen TV Awards	Outstanding Performance by an Actor in a Gag or Comedy Program	Michael V.	Won	
2014	Golden Screen TV Awards	Outstanding Performance by an Actress in a Gag or Comedy Program	Manilyn Reynes	Nominated	
2014	Golden Screen TV Awards	Outstanding Supporting Actor in a Gag or Comedy Show	John Feir	Nominated	
2014	Golden Screen TV Awards	Outstanding Supporting Actress in a Gag or Comedy Show	Nova Villa	Won	
2014	Golden Screen TV Awards	Outstanding Supporting Actress in a Gag or Comedy Show	Janna Dominguez Jessa Zaragosa Mosang	Nominated	
2014	Gawad Duyan Awards	Tanglaw ng Tahanan Award Natatanging Dulang Komediya Award	Pepito Manaloto: Ang Tunay na Kuwento	Won	
2014	1st Paragala Central Luzon Media Awards	Best Sitcom	Pepito Manaloto: Ang Tunay na Kuwento	Won	
2014	28th PMPC Star Awards for Television	Best Comedy Program	Pepito Manaloto: Ang Tunay na Kuwento	Nominated	
2014	28th PMPC Star Awards for Television	Best Comedy Actor	Michael V.	Nominated	
2014	28th PMPC Star Awards for Television	Best Comedy Actress	Manilyn Reynes	Nominated	
2014	28th PMPC Star Awards for Television	Best Comedy Actress	Nova Villa	Nominated	
2015	37th Catholic Mass Media Awards	Best Comedy Acting	Pepito Manaloto: Ang Tunay na Kuwento	Won	
2015	2nd Paragala Central Luzon Media Awards	Best Sitcom	Pepito Manaloto: Ang Tunay na Kuwento	Won	
2015	29th PMPC Star Awards for Television	Best Comedy Program	Pepito Manaloto: Ang Tunay na Kuwento	Won	
2015	29th PMPC Star Awards for Television	Best Comedy Actor	Michael V.	Nominated	
2015	29th PMPC Star Awards for Television	Best Comedy Actress	Manilyn Reynes	Nominated	
2015	USTv Awards	Students’ Choice of Comedy Program	Pepito Manaloto: Ang Tunay na Kuwento	Won	
2016	2nd Alta Media Icon Awards	Best Comedy Program	Pepito Manaloto: Ang Tunay na Kuwento	Won	
2016	BPSU Pinakamagiting na Programang Pantelebisyon	Pinakamagiting na Programang Pang-Komedya	Pepito Manaloto: Ang Tunay na Kuwento	Won	
2016	BPSU Pinakamagiting na Programang Pantelebisyon	Pinakamagiting na Personalidad sa Programang Pang-Komedya	Michael V.	Won	
2016	Catholic Mass Media Awards	Best Comedy Program	Pepito Manaloto: Ang Tunay na Kuwento	Won	
2016	30th PMPC Star Awards for Television	Best Comedy Program	Pepito Manaloto: Ang Tunay na Kuwento	Won	
2016	30th PMPC Star Awards for Television	Best Comedy Actor	Michael V.	Nominated	
2016	30th PMPC Star Awards for Television	Best Comedy Actress	Manilyn Reynes	Won	
2016	30th PMPC Star Awards for Television	Best Comedy Actress	Nova Villa	Nominated	
2016	Silverscreen Entertainment Award	Best Performance by an Actor in a Leading Role (TV Gag / Comedy)	Michael V.	Won	
2016	Silverscreen Entertainment Award	Best Performance by an Actress in a Supporting Role (TV Gag / Comedy)	Nova Villa	Won	
2016	US International Film and Video Festival	Certificate for Creative Excellence (Comedy category)	Pepito Manaloto: Ang Tunay na Kuwento	Won	
2017	31st PMPC Star Awards for Television	Best Comedy Program	Pepito Manaloto: Ang Tunay na Kuwento	Nominated	
2017	31st PMPC Star Awards for Television	Best Comedy Actor	Michael V.	Nominated	
2017	31st PMPC Star Awards for Television	Best Comedy Actress	Manilyn Reynes	Nominated	
2017	31st PMPC Star Awards for Television	Best Comedy Actress	Nova Villa	Nominated	
2017	Silverscreen Entertainment Award	Best Comedy Program	Pepito Manaloto: Ang Tunay na Kuwento	Nominated	
2017	8th Northwest Samar State University Students' Choice Awards for Radio and Television (NSCART) Awards	Best Comedy Program	Pepito Manaloto: Ang Tunay na Kuwento	Won	
2018	32nd PMPC Star Awards for Television	Best Comedy Program	Pepito Manaloto: Ang Tunay na Kuwento	Nominated	
2018	32nd PMPC Star Awards for Television	Best Comedy Actor	Michael V.	Nominated	
2018	32nd PMPC Star Awards for Television	Best Comedy Actress	Manilyn Reynes	Nominated	
2018	32nd PMPC Star Awards for Television	Best Comedy Actress	Nova Villa	Nominated	
2019	Anak TV Seal Awards	Anak TV Seal of Approval	Pepito Manaloto: Ang Tunay na Kuwento	Won	
2019	Anak TV Seal Awards	Household Favorite Award	Pepito Manaloto: Ang Tunay na Kuwento	Won	
2019	33rd PMPC Star Awards for Television	Best Comedy Show	Pepito Manaloto: Ang Tunay na Kuwento	Nominated	
2019	33rd PMPC Star Awards for Television	Best Comedy Actor	Michael V.	Nominated	
2019	33rd PMPC Star Awards for Television	Best Comedy Actress	Manilyn Reynes	Nominated	
2019	33rd PMPC Star Awards for Television	Best Comedy Actress	Nova Villa	Nominated	
2021	34th PMPC Star Awards for Television	Best Comedy Show	Pepito Manaloto: Ang Tunay na Kuwento	Won	
2021	34th PMPC Star Awards for Television	Best Comedy Actor	Michael V.	Nominated	
2021	34th PMPC Star Awards for Television	Best Comedy Actress	Manilyn Reynes	Won	
2021	34th PMPC Star Awards for Television	Best Comedy Actress	Nova Villa	Nominated	

Accolades received by Pepito Manaloto: Tuloy ang Kuwento
Year	Award	Category	Recipient	Result	Ref.
2023	35th PMPC Star Awards for Television	Best Comedy Show	Pepito Manaloto: Tuloy ang Kuwento	Won	
2023	35th PMPC Star Awards for Television	Best Comedy Actor	Michael V.	Nominated	
2023	35th PMPC Star Awards for Television	Best Comedy Actress	Manilyn Reynes	Won	
2023	35th PMPC Star Awards for Television	Best Comedy Actress	Nova Villa	Nominated	
2024	6th Gawad Lasallianeta	Most Outstanding Comedy Show	Pepito Manaloto: Tuloy ang Kuwento	Won	
2024	Asian Academy Creative Awards	Best Actor in a Comedy Role	Michael V.	Won	
2024	Asian Academy Creative Awards	Best Comedy Programme	Pepito Manaloto: Tuloy ang Kuwento	Won	
2025	37th PMPC Star Awards for Television	Best Comedy Actor	Michael V.	Nominated	
2025	37th PMPC Star Awards for Television	Best Comedy Actress	Manilyn Reynes	Nominated	
2025	37th PMPC Star Awards for Television	Best Comedy Show	Pepito Manaloto: Ang Tunay na Kuwento	Won	
2025	37th PMPC Star Awards for Television	Best New Male TV Personality	John Clifford	Nominated	
2025	38th PMPC Star Awards for Television	Best Comedy Actress	Manilyn Reynes	Nominated	
2025	38th PMPC Star Awards for Television	Best Comedy Actress	Nova Villa	Nominated	
2025	38th PMPC Star Awards for Television	Best Comedy Show	Pepito Manaloto: Tuloy ang Kuwento	Won	
