= Sabado Badoo =

2015 Philippine television comedy show

- Title card
- Genre: Comedy
- Written by: Wilson Abaya; Wystan Dimalanta; Henry Maceda, Jr.; Roel Raval; Mon Roco
- Directed by: Tata Betita
- Presented by: Betong Sumaya; Sef Cadayona
- Country of origin: Philippines
- Original language: Tagalog
- No. of episodes: 20

Production
- Executive producer: Sherril Sazon-Arevalo
- Production locations: Quezon City, Philippines
- Camera setup: Multiple-camera setup
- Running time: 30–45 minutes
- Production company: GMA Entertainment TV

Original release
- Network: GMA Network
- Release: March 14 – July 25, 2015

Sabado Badoo (transl. Saturday badoo) is a 2015 Philippine television comedy anthology show broadcast by GMA Network. Hosted by Betong Sumaya and Sef Cadayona, it premiered on March 14, 2015. The show concluded on July 25, 2015, with a total of 20 episodes.

== Ratings ==
According to AGB Nielsen Philippines' Mega Manila household television ratings, the pilot episode of Sabado Badoo earned a 13.1% rating. The final episode scored a 17.4% rating.
