= Encantadia =

Filipino television franchise

- Created by: Suzette Doctolero
- Original work: Encantadia (2005)

Films and television
- Film(s): Mulawin: The Movie (2005; crossover with Mulawin)
- Television series: Encantadia (2005); Etheria: Ang Ikalimang Kaharian ng Encantadia (2005–2006); Encantadia: Pag-ibig Hanggang Wakas (2006); Encantadia (2016–2017); Encantadia Chronicles: Sang'gre (2025–2026)

Games
- Video game(s): Encantadia Blast (2016)

Audio
- Soundtrack(s): "Tadhana" by Bayang Barrios (2005; 2016–2017; 2025–2026); "Hade" by Bayang Barrios (2005–2006); "Mahiwagang Puso" by Karylle and Jerome John Hughes (2006); "Bagong Tadhana" by Julie Anne San Jose (2025–2026)

Encantadia is a Filipino fantasy franchise produced and published by GMA Network. It consists of five television series, which have aired from 2005 to 2026, and a single film. The first series of the same name premiered in 2005 and concluded in the same year with total of 160 episodes. The second installment, Etheria: Ang Ikalimang Kaharian ng Encantadia, premiered in the same year and ended in 2006 with 50 episodes. Due to its significant success, a third series titled Encantadia: Pag-ibig Hanggang Wakas premiered in 2006 consisting of 48 episodes.

The series also had a crossover film with Mulawin in 2005 titled Mulawin: The Movie, which was produced by GMA Pictures as an entry to the 2005 Metro Manila Film Festival. In 2016, eleven years after the original run, a reboot of the series premiered on GMA Network featuring a new cast and ended in 2017 with a total of 218 episodes. A spinoff titled Encantadia Chronicles: Sang'gre premiered on the same network in 2025 featuring a new set of cast and characters and concluded in 2026 with a total of 233 episodes.

== Production ==
=== Development ===
Encantadia is a term coined from the Filipino words "enkanto", "enkanta", "enkantada", or "enkantado", which was in turn derived from the Spanish term encant(ad)o/a, which means enchanted beings endowed with supernatural powers. The series was created by GMA Network, the same network that produced the fantasy-themed series Mulawin and Darna. It was directed by Mark Reyes and Gil Tejada Jr., and written by Suzette Doctolero. Originally, the series was intended as GMA Films' entry to the 2004 Metro Manila Film Festival but they later decided to make Encantadia a daily fantasy soap opera due to its huge production and budget. Encantadia was Doctolero's first head writing project with the network in 2005, and also served as her training for writing a fantasy story for the first time. According to her, it was inspired by the story of Maria Makiling, a diwata (fairy) in Philippine folklore, in four different persona. It was also inspired by different stories around the world combined into one. The first three installment were consecutively shown from 2005 to 2006. In 2010, a second saga or fourth installment was scheduled to be produced by GMA Network, but it was not push through until Atty. Felipe L. Gozon, CEO of GMA Network pushed it back for 2012, but was scrapped. In 2015, the director, producer and the writer were given a go signal by the network to make the new Encantadia. In January 2016, it was announced that the fourth installment will be a reboot (often called as requel or retelling-sequel) of the old series. On December 31, 2021, the television series Encantadia Chronicles: Sang'gre was announced for a 2022 release for GMA Network, acting as a spin-off to the reboot series. On December 29, 2023, the series was delayed to 2024. The spin-off series is written by Doctolero. R.J. Nuevas serves as the creative director. Screenwriters Ricky Lee, Anna Aleta Nadela, Jake Somera, Ays de Guzman and program manager Ali Nokom-Dedicatoria are also a part of the production team. Initially Reyes was hired as the director and later left the series in November 2024. Rico Gutierrez and Enzo Williams served as his replacement.

=== Setting ===
According to Mark Reyes, the sets of Encantadia in 2005 are located in various places in the Philippines. The Kingdom of Adamya is located at Calatagan, Batangas. The cave set of Hathorian Kingdom is located at the Kalinawan Cave in Tanay, Rizal. Lireo's forest is located at Daranak Falls and Batlag Falls in Rizal. A 1,900 square meter warehouse in Pasig served as an indoor set with an improvised pond. The said warehouse was also a setting change for Lireo, Sapiro, Hera Andal, Hera Sensa and others. The Kingdom of Sapiro set is located inside the historic walled city of Intramuros (Old Manila) in the heart of Manila. In its second and third installment, the series used the same locations.

In 2016, a 3000 square meter warehouse in Makati was converted to a set for the Lireo Kingdom and its forest. The fallen Sapiro Kingdom and the Island of Cassiopeia were shot in Fortune Island in Batangas. Another warehouse set was converted as the Kingdom of Hathoria, while the mortal world were shot in various locations around Manila. The forest of Encantadia were shot in Tanay, Rizal, Pundaquit in Zambales as well as Batlag Falls and Daranak Falls.

=== Musical scoring ===
The main theme of the series is its own soundtrack entitled "Tadhana" (destiny) described as a chant/hymn, composed and sung by Filipino folk singer Bayang Barrios. According to Barrios, when she arrived in the recording studio, the hymn structure was already done by Allan Feliciano. The chant's theme is inspired by a drought and deforestation. One of the factors that contributed to the success of the 2005 series is its musical scoring, it was highly commended in the 2005 Asian Television Awards for "Best Original Music Score". In the sequel, Etheria, aside from "Tadhana", Feliciano also arranged a soundtrack titled as "Hade!!" (to attack) which refer as the Etherian war song; sung also by Barrios. Unlike "Tadhana", it is a lyrical song formed in Enchanta. Based on the lyrics, the song is about the creation of Encantadia, the five kingdoms including Etheria, and warfare. In the end, the composer appears to question the unending violence in the land including the lack of love and peace. Sub-tracks were also included in the series such as "Asshenti", an Etherian love song sung by Barrios and the Lirean Hymn, "Ivo" (life) arranged by Ariel Hugo, which was sung by Karylle. In the 2016 series, it uses the main soundtrack "Tadhana", which was modernized and beat has been altered to a rock-twist to fit the new generation. Moreover, "Ivo" was also used as recorded by Gabbi Garcia.

"Ang Mahiwagang Puso" (Enchanted Heart) written by Tats Faustino, sung by Karylle and Jerome John Hughes was used as a soundtrack to the original version of the series. Karylle also recorded "Hiling" (Wish) but was rarely used in the series. "Pangarap ni Lira" (Lira's wish), composed by Suzette Doctolero, arranged by Eric Torralba and sung by Jennylyn Mercado was also part of the soundtrack. Other soundtracks include "Isang Bagong Mundo" (A whole new world) performed by Mercado, arranged by Eric Torralba and written by Doctolero; "Sa Pakpak ng Paru-paro" (Fairy's Wings) composed by Mark A. Reyes and arranged by Eric Torralba.

"Maghihintay Ako" (I'll Be Waiting), sung by Gabbi Garcia and Christian Bautista and "Sa Pangarap Lang" (Through a Dream) sung by Mikee Quintos are being used in the 2016 series. Quintos also recorded "Ang Awit ni Lira" (Lira's Hymn) for the requel.

== Overview ==
Encantadia is an enchanted realm inhabited by a race of magical Elf-like beings called Encantados. It was created thousand years ago by five deities Haliya, Arde, Emre, Keros and Ether, who were referred to as bathala (Gods) in present times. The world they created was settled by a primitive race of humans called "barbaro". The Bathala then created a caste system to distinguish each race: the diwata's (fairies) of the Kingdom of Lireo; mystical creatures of the Adamyan territory; the warriors and healers called Sapiryans of the Kingdom of Sapiro; and the blacksmiths of the Kingdom of Hathoria. The four kingdoms were thus formed and they worshipped Emre, the greatest of the Bathala. Emre's dominion over Encantadia prompted a jealous Arde and Ether to assassinate him. Emre discovered their plan and cursed both of them: Arde became a dragon and was sent to guard valaak (hell) while Ether was turned into a giant snake as a reminder of her treachery. Emre's punishment of the two Bathala divided Encantadia's inhabitants into several factions based on the gods they worship. Most encantados followed Ether and established the Kingdom of Etheria, which came to dominate Encantadia with an iron fist until its Queen Avria was deposed by the four resurgent kingdoms to restore peace and stability.

=== The Gods ===
- Cassiopeia - The Bathaluman of Love and Protection. Former queen of the fairies and first keeper of the whole Mother Gem. She endured many trials.
- Emre – One of the Supreme Bathalas of Encantadia. He resides in Devas, the home of the blessed dead. He was originally the Bathala of Spirituality and of Time and Space. He created the Mother Gem to protect Encantados from Etheria and the magic of Ether.
- Keros – The Bathala of Destruction. Without him, nothing will be destroyed and that will outbalance the World of Encantadia. Everything he touches gets destroyed. He formerly resided in Binyaan, a dead island away from the continent of Encantadia. He was killed by Arde, and his soul will go back to the realm of high heavens.
- Haliya – The Bathaluman of the Two Moons. She is one of the five Bathalas and Bathalumans who created the world of Encantadia. She has a powerful Trident called De'jar, it means Cursed. She was originally the Bathala of Wisdom and the Mind.
- Ether – Originally the Bathaluman of Creation, Physicality and Being. She is one of the Bathalas who planned to kill Emre because of her envy of the encantados worshipping Emre. She was cursed and turned into a giant snake, which reminds every encantado about her treachery. She created the Empire of Etheria, led by Avria and planned to take over ancient Encantadia. Ether resurrected her ancient fallen empire in the present to create a divine coup and take Emre's throne in Devas.
- Arde – The Bathala of Bala'ak (Hell). Originally he was the Bathala of Emotions, Energy, and Transformation. One of the Bathalas who planned to kill Emre. He was a cohort and lover of Ether. He was cursed and turned into a dragon, and sent into Bala'ak, Encantadia's hell and underworld.
- Gargan - The Bathala of Chaos, Darkness, and Destruction. He is the keeper of the Black Gem and sworn enemy of Encantadia. Unlike Bathalang Emre, who shaped the Encantadia with light and order, Gargan exists to destroy those creations. His power feeds on despair and imbalance, and his ultimate goal is to bring ruin to everything Emre built, claiming dominion over all Encantados lives.

=== The Kingdoms ===
Encantadia map labeled per Kingdom and territories.

- Sapiro – A kingdom in the northern valley of Encantadia; protector of the gemstone of earth. Their kingdom has the most fertile land in the whole of Encantadia
- Hathoria – A kingdom in the west of Encantadia; protector of the gemstone of fire. Originally a fertile land but became a barren wasteland because of the heavy industrialization of Hathoria. It is surrounded by volcanoes that give their kingdom an abundance of minerals underground that they use for their war machinery.
- Lireo – A kingdom in the east of Encantadia and is home to the royal blood diwatas; protector of the gemstone of air. It is located on top of the Eastern Mountains of Encantadia. A futuristic looking matriarchal queendom that is powered by windmills. It is the home of the temple of Emre.
- Adamya – A former Kingdom in the south of Encantadia; protector of the gemstone of water. It is an archipelago surrounded by the Southern Adamyan Ocean. It is the only unfortified territory in Encantadia. It has lush forests and many seashores.
- Etheria – The fallen empire of Encantadia; It is composed of four Heras or royal houses namely Hera Andal- the seat of Etherian power and home of Ether's temple, Hera Volo- the royal house of Etheria's military, Hera Sensa- the royal house of mind benders and Hera Ae-ga- the royal house of emotion bending Amazons.
- Mine-a-ve – In the 2025 series, a new Kingdom was introduced called Mine-a-ve, the Land of Darkness (Lupain ng Karimlan), an ice kingdom ruled by Mitena, sister of Bathaluman Cassiopea. It is located on a large island located east of the continent of Encantadia, north of Encantadia proper (the known kingdoms of Lireo, Sapiro, and Hathoria). Its northern light skies (or aurora borealis) surround the kingdom and its waters have green light.

=== Territories ===
- Askano – A territory in the northernmost part of Sapiro; home of the barbaros.
- Adjantao -A territory between Lireo and Sapiro; home of individuals called mandirigma (scavengers/warriors) who do not recognize the Queen of Lireo.
- Avila/Avalon – A territory between Hathoria and Sapiro; home of the winged creatures called Mulawin.
- Carcero – A sub-territory in the northernmost part of Lireo and Sapiro, bounded by Adjantao and Askano in the west. It serves as prison to lock-up Lireans who committed crimes. It's guarded around by bakunawas (sea serpents).
- Ayleb – A sub-territory within the north of Lireo introduced in the 2016 series, which served as a refugee camp and hide-out to the escaped prisoners of Carcero including Adhara and Lilasari.
- Nymfas – A territory introduced in the 2016 series where Deshna, daughter of Hagorn was brought for safe keeping. They are home to tree-men who can climb and reach the highest trees.
- Gunikars - The territory is located in the most mysterious land of Adamya. It is the Adamyan tribe who masters in assassination and parkour. They are the ninjas of Encantadia.
- Hera Sensa – A sub-territory in the Kingdom of Etheria. Home of the ruthless Etherians, ghoul hunters, two to five-eyed psychics, priestesses, scholars, mind readers and controllers, witches, predicters, transmogrifiers, and clairvoyants.
- Hera Andal – Center of monarch in the Kingdom of Etheria, houses the throne of greedy villain Queen Avria and Etherian nobles, witches, and sorcerers. Known for their dark sorcery, soul manipulation, spells, potions, poisons, mystic dark chants, and healing abilities.
- Hera Aega – A sub-territory in the Kingdom of Etheria. Home of the ruthless Etherian warriors, scribes, hunters, and amazons who wield magical bow and arrows which can manipulate emotions. They are the most mysterious tribe in Encantadia.
- Hera Volo – A sub-territory in the Kingdom of Etheria. Home of the ruthless and diabolical Etherian warriors, allurers, flyers, and Etherian militaries that can manipulate time and speed. They possess unique and rare culture along with Andal. They perform mystic dance and chants to their evil Bathaluman.
- Punjabwes - A renegade tribe found in a remote territory of Sapiro. They possess unique capabilities that make them a formidable enemy. They are the pirates of Encantadia. They are burglars among with Mandirigmas that masters mechanical technology that is more advanced than Hathorians. They can entertain anyone through their dances, songs, and colorful performances. Males are the leaders and warriors while women are the servants and babaylans. It houses the scheming and vicious Prince Manik, the sole warrior Azulan, and Ariana, the sarkosi of Hara Amihan II.

=== The Gems ===
The world of Encantadia is powered and guarded by a powerful gem called Inang Brilyante (mother gem) gifted by Emre (God of Light), the first Queen of Lireo. The gem has powerful characteristics and abilities, and is considered as the most powerful relic in Encantadia. Many encantados covet the gemstone in an attempt to rule the realm, driving Cassiopeia to break it into four elemental gems that hold balance to the realm: fire, air, water and earth. She then handed them to the four kingdoms of Encantadia for safekeeping. However, King Arvak of Hathoria, consumed by greed, desired to acquire all the gems, so he used the fire gemstone he protected as a weapon in his war to conquer Encantadia. In the ensuing war, Arvak was killed and Prince Raquim of Sapiro was able to recover the fire and water gem from King Arvak, and decided to bring the two gems, along with Sapiro's earth gem, to Lireo for safekeeping. Since then, the four powerful gems are guarded by Queen Minea of Lireo who then hands them to her four daughters: Pirena, the keeper of the fire gem; Amihan, the air gem; Alena, the water gem; and Danaya, the earth gem. In the reboot a fifth gem is introduced as a small shard of the mother gem. When the mother gem is destroyed, the fifth gem is thrown to the sea shore where a lost mortal becomes its keeper.

- Fire Gem (Brilyante ng Apoy) – The gem grants its owner the power to control fire, warmth and light. In this sense, the beholder can intensify sunlight and conjure fire. This gem has the ability of shapeshifting into another person. It can also create volcanic eruptions.
- Air Gem (Brilyante ng Hangin) – The gem grants its owner the power to control the air, wind and coldness. In this sense, the beholder can change air currents, conjure oxygen in areas without it and transform into the air itself. It also grants the holder the ability to fly and shapeshift into wind. The gem can also be employed in detecting the presence of nearby beings by tracing the sound of their breaths.
- Water Gem (Brilyante ng Tubig) – The gem grants its keeper the power to control water. It enhances its keeper's strength and enables the person to control biosonar, liquids and sea creatures. It also enables its keeper to summon rain and portray an image through water.
- Earth Gem (Brilyante ng Lupa) – The gem grants its owner earth-based powers, enabling the person to control the earth, vegetation and nature. In this sense, the beholder can conjure earthquakes, communicate with plants and animals, shapeshift into any flora and fauna and heal herself. Without the presence of the gem of earth, plants would wilt, animals would die, and beings in Encantadia would weaken.
- Spirit Gem (Brilyante ng Diwa) - In the 2016 series, a fifth gem, also called Brilyante ng Diwa (Gem of Spirit) was introduced as a result of a fragment from Cassiopeia's intense breakage of the Mother gem. Its powers and abilities are all the abilities of the four gemstone and has power to give life and control spirits and the spirit realm.
- Purple Gem (Brilyanteng Lila) - Also in the 2016 series, a sixth gem Brilyanteng Lila (Purple Gem) was also introduced, a cube-shaped amethyst used by Emre to tempt Lira with power, along with riches. He said that the sixth gem has equal power to the first five gems. It has the power of balance of nature. The first five gems are to create and maintain, the final gem is for destruction and rebirth. Its powers is to balance all the works (antimatter) of all the other gems. Lira declined the gem and was kept until now by Emre. This gem is not part of the Inang Brilyante (Mother Gem).
- Black Gem (Itim na Brilyante) - In the 2025 series, a new gem that introduced was called as The Itim na Brilyante (Black Gem), is the gem owned by Bathalang Gargan, the god of destruction. The Itim na Brilyante appears initially as a massive black stone that can be summoned hovering between the wielder's two hands from their person at will. Once active, the stone splits open into fragments floating together, revealing a perpetually flaming core with its characteristic crest in stone in its very center. This Gem is not a force of life like the Inang Brilyante and its fragments but is instead a weapon of destruction and darkness.

=== Enchanta ===
Encantadia uses a fictional language called Enchanta. It was created and conceptualized by Suzette Doctolero to make the viewers feel that the world of Encantados be somehow realistic and genuine. Doctolero created its vocabulary from many Indo-European languages with some influences of Philippine languages especially Tagalog. It can be traced from words like "corre", to love (from the root "cor" meaning heart) and "avoya", to travel (voyage). The language is also notable for its phonology, which is reminiscent of that of Romance languages. Most characters from the Encantadia saga know how to speak Enchanta, but it was Cassiopeia that had spoken the language most in the whole series, from the fact that she is the first diwata (fairy) of Lireo and ancestor of all the royal-blooded diwatas.

=== Mine-a-ve ===
The Mine-a-ve language (Mine-a-ve) is a constructed language revealed for Mine-a-ve, the kingdom of Mitena, used in the TV show Encantadia Chronicles: Sang'gre, a sequel to the 2016 series. Every Mine-a-vean word falls on the penultimate syllable by default; if not, an acute accent (´) is used. In addition to the Latin alphabet, the letters č, ň, ř, š, and ž are used for palatalization, resulting in a total of 31 letters. The letter c is pronounced /ts/, similar to the Esperanto language, but not between hard vowels (a, o, and u), where it is pronounced /k/. The letter k is used to pronounce /k/ in between soft vowels (e and i), or among one of them (e.g., between a hard vowel and a soft vowel, and vice versa). The letters “th” (pronounced θ) and “dh” (pronounced ð), which both come from the Albanian language, are some of the only digraphs in the Mine-a-ve language. The Mine-a-ve language is a polysynthetic VSO (verb-subject-object) language that becomes SVO (subject-verb-object) when the words ňe-ha (meaning not) or eš(k) (meaning is) are used, similar to Enchanta and Hathorkha. Similar to the latter two, the Mine-a-ve language is pro-drop because the conjugations tell who the subject is. It has four grammatical cases: nominative, accusative, genitive, and dative. It also has four genders, namely masculine, feminine, common, and neuter. Despite its rich vocabulary, due to the death of the Mine-a-ves, the Mine-a-vean language is extinct. Unlike the Enchan and Hathorkha scripts, Mine-a-ve uses an alphabet instead of syllables or abugida. The level of intelligibility between the Enchan and Mine-a-ve languages is relatively low (~30%) due to their unique vocabulary and/or false friends.

=== Wars in Encantadia ===
Throughout its history, Encantadia is plagued by four major conflicts that threatened the peace of the realm.

	Wars of Encantadia			
	Great Encantadian War	Lirean war	War of the four Gems	War Between Good and Evil
Belligerents	Kingdom of Lireo; Kingdom of Sapiro; Kingdom of Adamya; Kingdom of Hathoria	Kingdoms of Lireo; Kingdom of Sapiro; Territory of Adamya		Kingdom of Lireo; Kingdom of Sapiro; Kingdom of Hathoria; Territory of Adamya (Tanggulan)
Commanders and Leaders	Queen Cassiopeia(Lireo); King Meno(Sapiro); Elder Aegen(Adamya); King Bartimus(Hathoria)	Queen Minea (Lireo); King Armeo (Sapiro); Prince Raquim (Sapiro); Prince Asval (Sapiro); Elder Imaw (Adamya)	Queen Amihan; Sangg're Alena; Sangg're Danaya; Sangg're Pirena (Lireo's liberation) (Lireo); Prince Ybrahim (Sapiro); Elder Imaw (Adamya); General Aquil (Lireo); General Kidlat (Lireo); General Alira Naswen (Sapiro); Commander Muros (Lireo); Commander Hamaro (Lireo); Commander Hitano (Lireo); LilaSari (Adhara's Army)	Emre; Cassiopea; Haliya (Support); Queen Danaya (Lireo); Queen Pirena (Hathoria); Sang'gre Alena(Lireo); King Ybrahim (Sapiro); Prince Markus (Sapiro); Elder Imaw (Adamya); Sangg're Lira (Lireo); Sangg're Mira (Hathoria); General Muros(Lireo); General Hamaro (Lireo); General Mayca (Sapiro); Commander Hitano (Lireo); Commander Kaizan (Sapiro); Commander Aquil (Lireo/Adamya); Commander Amarro (Lireo/Adamya); Princess LilaSari (Sapiro) (after Queen Avria's death)
	-versus-			
Belligerents	Empire of Etheria	Kingdom of Hathoria		Kingdom of Etheria; Hagorn's army
Commanders and Leaders	Queen Avria; Hera Juvila; Hera Andora; Hera Odessa	King Arvak; Prince Hagorn; General Agane; Commander Rexad	King Hagorn; Prince Asval; General Agane; Commander Rexad; Sangg're Pirena; Queen LilaSari (until Lireo's Liberation)	Ether; Arde; Keros (Support); Queen Avria; King Hagorn; Hera Andora; Hera Juvila; Hera Odessa; General Asval; General Amarro (until Avria's death); General LilaSari (until Avria's death)
Outcome	The Empire of Etheria has been defeated by the combined forces of the other four kingdoms of Encantadia and resulted in the death of Etherian Queen Avria. Encantadia was then divided into the four kingdoms of Lireo, Adamya, Sapiro and Hathoria. Mine-a assumed the throne of Lireo.	The King of Hathoria, Arvak was killed toward the end of the war while leading his troops trying to stem a full retreat of his armies after the successful onslaught of the allied Encantadian armies that broke the back of his invasion forces. The Water and Fire gems were recovered and brought to Lireo for safe keeping.	King Hagorn was killed by his own daughter Pirena, and eventually reclaimed the fire gem. All of Hathoria retreated, and Lireo gained its victory. The four gems was then merged back into one. Lira is supposed to succeed Amihan, but refused, leading the throne of Lireo to Danaya. In the 2016 series of Encantadia, Amihan gave up her life to fight Hagorn's army of spirits. King Hagorn was then killed by Pirena leading to Hathoria's fall. Emre also defeated Arde and Ether. Danaya ascended the throne of Lireo, while Ybrahim finally crowned as King of Sapiro. The five gems was then merged back as one.	Appears only in the 2016 version of Encantadia. The war has brought the death of Ariana and Muyak, King Hagorn was killed by Raquim while Ether has been punished by Emre. Peace was restored to all the Kingdoms. Alena ascended the throne of Lireo, while Cassiopeia became a Bathaluman (Goddess).

== Main series ==
=== Encantadia (2005) ===
Queen Minea is the ruler of Lireo and she lives with her daughters Amihan, Alena, Danaya, and Pirena, who are collectively called the Sang'gres who are tasked with protecting the four elemental gemstones that bring harmony and peace to the realm of Encantadia. Everything changed when Pirena, Minea's eldest daughter, consumed by greed and jealousy, revolts against her half sister Amihan who has been chosen by their mother as the new Queen of Lireo instead of her. This provokes Pirena to give away the fiery gemstone she protected to her biological father Hagorn, ruler of the fiery Kingdom of Hathoria. With the fire gemstone in Hagorn's hands, he and Pirena wage war against the kingdoms of Encantadia to conquer the realm. Amidst the raging War of the Four Gems, Lira, the lost daughter of Amihan, returns to Encantadia to try to mend the broken relationships of the strong-willed Sang'gres and restore peace to the realm.

=== Etheria: Ang Ikalimang Kaharian ng Encantadia (2005–06) ===
In ancient times, there existed a great empire called Etheria, ruled by Reyna Avria, who ruled the small petty kingdoms of Lireo, Sapiro, Adamya and Hathoria with an iron fist. The four kingdoms soon banded together and defeated Etheria in the Great Encantadian War. When Etheria fell, Avria swore that Etheria would return to power once the last Sang'gre is born. The prophecy is eventually fulfilled with the birth of Cassandra. Etheria rose again from the ashes and in order to save the present, the four Sang'gres of Lireo travelled to the past, in ancient Encantadia, to find the lost Sang'gre and destroy the Ginintuang Orasan (Etheria's powerful weapon) to stop Avria's centuries-old plan to dominate the realm.

=== Encantadia: Pag-ibig Hanggang Wakas (2006) ===
After stopping the return of Etheria in the previous season, Pirena, Amihan, Alena (now Queen of Sapiro) and Danaya (now Queen of Lireo), along with King Ybrahim of Sapiro, confront the vengeful Four Herans of the Etherian Kingdom.

=== Encantadia (2016–17) ===
A reboot of the original TV series but with new storylines and elements from the second series.

=== Spin-offs ===
==== Mulawin: The Movie (2005) ====
Pirena uses the "gintong binhi" (golden seed) to bring Ravenum back to life. Ravenum summons the dragon Buwarka and raises an army of Ravenas to wreak havoc on Avila territory. With the power of Mulawin's "Tree of Life" dwindling down and the Mulawin race in peril, the Diwatas of Encantadia and the Tres Aves (a legendary trio of heroes with special abilities) rushed to aid the Mulawin. The Mulawins and the Lireo soldiers led by Ybarro/Ybrahim faces the Ravenas until they defeated them. They return to Avila after a victory and a deadly battle. Aguiluz is seen lying in a royal bed in Lireo with Queen Amihan putting the "gintong binhi" to his mouth that can get his life back.

==== Encantadia Chronicles: Sang'gre (2025–26) ====
Encantadia Chronicles: Sang’gre is about a girl named Terra who manifests magical superpowers without knowing that she is the only daughter of Danaya, the youngest among the four Sang’gre sisters and the keeper of the earth gem.

== Episodes ==
Book	Episodes	Originally aired		Total Episodes
Book	Episodes	First aired	Last aired	Total Episodes
Encantadia (2005 TV series)	160	May 2, 2005	December 9, 2005	709
Etheria: Ang Ikalimang Kaharian ng Encantadia	50	December 12, 2005	February 17, 2006	709
Encantadia: Pag-Ibig Hanggang Wakas	48	February 20, 2006	April 28, 2006	709
Encantadia (2016 TV series)	218	July 18, 2016	May 19, 2017	709
Encantadia Chronicles: Sang'gre	233	June 16, 2025	May 8, 2026	709

=== Broadcast ===
Encantadia series are broadcast by GMA Network in the Philippines and through its international subsidiaries like GMA Pinoy TV in other countries. The 2005 series' broadcasts in Malaysia began in 2012 through Astro Bella and was subbed in English language. In 2014, the first two series were made available in ASEAN countries such as Philippines, Malaysia, Brunei, Vietnam, Myanmar, Laos, Thailand, Singapore and Indonesia through Fox Filipino, a subsidiary of Fox Broadcasting Company. All of the first three series including the spin-off film are made available as video on demand on iflix and HOOQ in 2015. The 2016 series is also made available exclusively on iflix as 1080p video on demand wherein new episodes are uploaded a day after its airing in GMA Network. According to iflix manager Sherwin Dela Cruz, "we are hugely proud to support the Philippines’ exceptionally talented local entertainment industry. Encantadia has an incredible legacy, which we are honored to be a part of..." The said series can be streamed online through iflix in the Philippines, Malaysia, Thailand, Indonesia, and Sri Lanka.

== Cast and characters ==
Here are the list of recurring characters in the Encantadia franchise from 2005 to present, limited to major and minor roles as described. This table does not include cameos.

Characters	GMA Network series				
Characters	Encantadia (2005)	Etheria: Ang Ika-limang Kaharian ng Encantadia (2005–2006)	Encantadia: Pag-Ibig Hanggang Wakas (2006)	Encantadia (2016–2017)	Encantadia Chronicles: Sang'gre (2025)
Hara Mine-a	Dawn Zulueta	Nadine Samonte	Dawn Zulueta	Marian Rivera	
Sang'gre Amihan I				Max Collins	
Sang'gre Pirena	Sunshine Dizon Nicola Sermonia (young Pirena)	Sunshine Dizon	Sunshine Dizon	Glaiza de Castro Dimple Magnaye (Little Pirena) Barbara Miguel (young Pirena)	Glaiza de Castro
Sang'gre Amihan	Iza Calzado Kristine Mangle (young Amihan)	Iza Calzado	Iza Calzado	Kylie Padilla Dayara Shane (young Amihan)	Kylie Padilla
Sang'gre Alena	Karylle Abigael Arazo (young Alena)	Karylle	Karylle	Gabbi Garcia Althea Ablan (young Alena)	Gabbi Garcia
Sang'gre Danaya	Diana Zubiri Julianne Gomez (young Danaya)	Diana Zubiri	Diana Zubiri	Sanya Lopez JC Movido (young Danaya)	Sanya Lopez
Ybarro/Rama Ybrahim	Dingdong Dantes	Dingdong Dantes	Dingdong Dantes	Ruru Madrid	Ruru Madrid
Sang'gre Lira/Milagros	Jennylyn Mercado		Jennylyn Mercado	Mikee Quintos Chlaui Malayao (young Lira/Mila)	Mikee Quintos
Sang'gre Mira	Yasmien Kurdi			Kate Valdez Kariz Espinosa (young Mira)	Kate Valdez
Sang'gre Kahlil	Jake Cuenca	Jake Cuenca		Avery Paraiso	
Cassandra		Ella Guevara	Precious Lara Quigaman Ella Guevara (young Cassandra)	Not specified	Michelle Dee
Hagorn	Pen Medina	Pen Medina Ping Medina (young Hagorn)	Pen Medina	John Arcilla	John Arcilla
Agane	Leila Kuzma			Rochelle Pangilinan	Rochelle Pangilinan
Anthony	Mark Herras Phytos Ramirez (young Anthony)			Migo Adecer Andy Smith (adult Anthony)	
Rosing	Vangie Labalan			Carmen del Rosario	
Apek	Michael Roy Jornales	Michael Roy Jornales	Michael Roy Jornales		
Mashna Aquil	Alfred Vargas	Alfred Vargas BJ Forbes (young Aquil)	Alfred Vargas	Rocco Nacino	Rocco Nacino
Hitano	Polo Ravales			Pancho Magno	
Mashna Muros	Arthur Solinap	Arthur Solinap	Arthur Solinap	Carlo Gonzales	Carlo Gonzales
Wantuk	Marky Lopez	Marky Lopez	Marky Lopez	Buboy Villar	Buboy Villar
Bathalumang Cassiopeia	Cindy Kurleto	Cindy Kurleto Empress Schuck (young Cassiopeia)	Cindy Kurleto	Solenn Heussaff	Solenn Heussaff
Hera Ornia		Glydel Mercado	Glydel Mercado		Maxine Medina
Heran Memen		Tonton Gutierrez	Tonton Gutierrez		Wendell Ramos
Evades	Chinggoy Alonzo	Chinggoy Alonzo	Chinggoy Alonzo	Ces Aldaba	
Raquim	Richard Gomez	Dennis Trillo (young Raquim)	Richard Gomez	Dingdong Dantes	
Gurna	Girlie Sevilla	Aiza Marquez		Vaness del Moral	Dianne dela Fuente
Ades				Ana Feleo	
Asval	Bobby Andrews	Sid Lucero (young Asval)		Neil Ryan Sese	
Muyak	Nancy Castiglione			Klea Pineda	
Wahid	Benjie Paras	Benjie Paras	Benjie Paras	Andre Paras	
Apitong	John Regala Dominic Gacad (young Apitong)			Christian Bautista	
Asnara				Jaycee Parker	
Amanda	Irma Adlawan			Angelu de Leon	
Dado	Allan Paule			Leandro Baldemor	
Bathalumang Ether		Angel Aquino	Angel Aquino	Janice Hung (Bathaluman form)	Janice Hung (Bathaluman form)
Bathalang Emre		Raymond Bagatsing	Raymond Bagatsing	Zoren Legaspi	Not specified
Bathalang Arde	Bart Guingona	Simon Ibarra			Not specified
Bathalang Keros				Ian De Leon	Kiel Rodriguez
Bathalumang Haliya				Valeen Montenegro	Ahtisa Manalo
Galatea			Cheska Iñigo		
Hara Avria		Francine Prieto	Francine Prieto	Eula Valdez Solenn Heussaff (young Avria)	
Hera Andora		Alessandra De Rossi	Alessandra De Rossi	Rochelle Pangilinan	
Hera Odessa		Pauleen Luna	Pauleen Luna	Sheree Bautista	
Hera Juvila		Jopay Paguia	Jopay Paguia	Jinri Park	
As'Nan		Rachel Lobangco			
Barkus		Tirso Cruz III	Tirso Cruz III		
Cilatus		Daniel Fernando	Daniel Fernando		
Viktu		Neil Ryan Sese	Not specified	Not specified	
Marvus	Ryan Eigenmann	Ryan Eigenmann	Ryan Eigenmann		
Arkrey		Justin Cuyugan	Justin Cuyugan		
Heran Animus		Paolo Paraiso	Paolo Paraiso		
Bartimus	Daniel Fernando	Nonie Buencamino	Nonie Buencamino		
Meno		Gary Estrada	Gary Estrada		
Banak		Pekto	Pekto	Not specified	Not specified
Nakba		Rainier Castillo	Rainier Castillo	Not specified	Not specified
Imaw	Noel Urbano	Noel Urbano	Noel Urbano	Noel Urbano	Noel Urbano
Awoo	Animatronic Puppet Only (a fictional species in the form of a camel-dog)				
Arvak	Al Tantay	Michael Flores		Roi Vinzon	
Hera Ora		Maricel Morales	Maricel Morales		
Xenos	Frank Garcia	Frank Garcia			
Armeo	Ian Veneracion		Ian Veneracion	Jestoni Alarcon	
Alira Naswen				Julienne Lee	
Gamil				Ken Alfonso	
Dagtum	Gerard Pizzaras			Edwin Reyes	
Axilom	Brad Turvey				
Lavanea	Juliana Palermo				Ina Feleo
Mayne	Diane Sison				
Dakila	Eddie Gutierrez				
Bagwis	Zoren Legaspi				
Cleu	Jey Gumiran				
Mashna Mayca				Cheska Iñigo	Cheska Iñigo
Kaizan				Mara Alberto	
Enuo		Andrei Felix		Rafa Siguion-Reyna	Red Dilla
Rael				Betong Sumaya	
Pako				James Teng	
Icarus				Ervic Vijandre	
Pao-Pao				Phytos Ramirez Yuan Francisco (young Paopao) Rodjun Cruz (Soul Gem's Twin Spirit)	Ryan Yllana
Vish'ka				Conan Stevens	
Sang'gre Adhara				Sunshine Dizon	
Pagaspas				Miguel Tanfelix	
Lakan				Alden Richards	
Lilasari				Diana Zubiri	
Hafte Lanzu				Maureen Larrazabal	
Orthana				Ge Villamil	
Rexad				Mike Lloren	
Aera	Maggie Wilson	Maggie Wilson			
Aure	Cheska Garcia				
Avilan	Romnick Sarmenta				Radson Flores
Alipato	Antonio Aquitania				Jay Ortega
Agua	Sunshine Garcia			Janine Gutierrez	Elle Villanueva
Sari-a			Geneva Cruz		Lexi Gonzales
Deshna/Luna				Inah de Belen	
Amarro		Alfred Vargas		Alfred Vargas	
Gilas				Jake Vargas	
Helgad				Winwyn Marquez	
Azulan			Jay R	Marx Topacio	Marx Topacio
Luntian			Jaja Gonzales		
Violeta			Boomboom Gonzales		
Kahel			Raul Dillo		
Rehav Manik				Joross Gamboa	
Ariana				Arra San Agustin	
Rosas			Marnie Lapuz	Via Antonio	
Memfes				Lance Serrano	
Jamir				Paolo Gumabao	
Sang'gre Armea			Jackie Rice		Ysabel Ortega
Arman			Marky Cielo JM Reyes (young Arman)		
Abog	Lloyd Baredo			Daniel Dasalla Bato	Daniel Dasalla Bato
Bono	CJ Ramos				
Sang'gre Terra					Bianca Umali Juharra Asayo (young Terra)
Sang'gre Flamarra				Not specified	Faith da Silva Cheska Maranan (young Flamarra)
Sang'gre Deia					Angel Guardian Keith Silagan (young Deia)
Sang'gre Adamus				Not specified	Kelvin Miranda Angelo Teves (young Adamus)
Kera Mitena				Solenn Heussaff	Rhian Ramos Sienna Stevens (young Mitena)
Olgana					Bianca Manalo
Zaur					Gabby Eigenmann
Kapre					Benjie Paras
Daron					Jon Lucas
Veshdita					Shuvee Etrata Precious Sta. Maria (young Veshdita)
Ednu					Jamie Wilson
Soldarius					Luis Hontiveros
Kosshava					Billie Hakenson
Vitha					Haley Dizon
Mantuk					Vito Gueco
Tukman					Kiel Gueco
Anaca					Mika Salamanca Barbara Miguel
Puddy					Matt Lozano
Tambi					Moi Bien
Mamadu					Lotlot Bustamante
Almiro					Derrick Monasterio
Rikit					Skye Chua
Hedrik					Larkin Castor
Mayumi					Brianna Bunagan
Gaeia				Not specified	Cassandra Lavarias
Ec'naad					Justin de Dios
Harahen					Diana Zubiri
Celebes					Gazini Ganados
Erenea					Patricia Tumulak
Bathalang Gargan					Tom Rodriguez

== In other media ==
=== Video games ===
Encantadia Blast
- Encantadia Blast logo
- Developers: GMA New Media; Digify (company)
- Platforms: Android, IOS
- Genre: Puzzle

A free mobile application game available in IOS and Android entitled Encantadia Blast was released in 2016. It was presented by GMA Network's subsidiaries, GMA New Media and Digify as part of the Encantadia franchise, the first mobile game in the Philippines inspired by a series. As of September 2016, the mobile app has been downloaded 100,000 times in Android phones with generally positive reviews. It features 80 levels, divided in four kingdoms with exclusive trivias flashing every after game. It is inspired by Candy Crush Saga with the use of the series' powerful gems.

Earlier in 2006, a non-free mobile game called Encantadia was released exclusively for Symbian/Java-capable devices, published by GetJar.

=== Home media ===
On March 4, 2008, GMA records released the episodes of the 2005 series of Encantadia on DVD with 160 episodes divided into 12 volumes of DVD. Jason John Lim, former head of GMA records in 2005 stated in an interview that the DVD was released due to public demands specially for viewers overseas.

=== Merchandise ===
On December 24, 2016, series of photos of different Encantadia collectible items has been uploaded on Instagram by the director and casts including jackets, mugs, stickers, notebooks and caps during their Christmas party held at Riverside Studios, Manila. On December 25, it was announced that official merchandise for the series became available in January 2017.

=== In popular culture ===
An Encantadia parody has also been featured in a comedy show, Bubble Gang under GMA Network in 2005 entitled as "Pinkantadia". The parody was inspired by the 2005 series including the sequel, Etheria. The said spoof featured comedy actors, Michael V., Wendell Ramos, Antonio Aquitania and Ara Mina. Ramos played Memen in the spin-off series. In 2016–2017, another spoof from Bubble Gang arose and known as "Engkantodo" which depicts hunger. The said spoof featured comedy actors Michael V, Sef Cadayona, Aquitania, Paolo Contis, Betong Sumaya, Boy2 Quizon, Max Collins, Jackie Rice, and Valeen Montenegro. Aquitania played Alipato and Rice was the former Sang'gre Armea both in the original series while Sumaya played the mortal named Rael, Collins played Sang'gre Amihan I and Montenegro played Bathalumang Haliya all in the reboot series. In 2025, the program of the same title, featured another spoof entitled as "Ang'gre" which is inspired by the 2025 series and depicts anger issues featuring comedy actors Chariz Solomon, Analyn Barro, Kokoy de Santos, and Buboy Villar. Villar played the role of Wantuk in both Reboot and spin-off series.
