= Encantadia (disambiguation) =

Encantadia is a Filipino media franchise. Encantadia may also refer to:

- Encantadia (2005 TV series), a 2005 fantasy series produced by GMA Network
- Encantadia (2016 TV series), a 2016 reboot/sequel series of the same title
