= Encantadia: Pag-ibig Hanggang Wakas =

2006 Philippine television drama series

- Title card
- Also known as: Avisala Encantadia: Love Until the End
- Genre: Fantasy drama
- Created by: Suzette Doctolero
- Written by: Suzette Doctolero; Joseph Balboa; Anna Aleta Nadela; Vienuel Lavina Ello
- Directed by: Gil Tejada Jr.
- Starring: Sunshine Dizon; Iza Calzado; Karylle; Diana Zubiri; Dingdong Dantes
- Theme music composer: Allan Feliciano
- Opening theme: "Mahiwagang Puso" by Karylle and Jerome John Hughes
- Composer: Tata Betita
- Country of origin: Philippines
- Original language: Tagalog
- No. of episodes: 48

Production
- Executive producers: Winnie Hollis Reyes; Mona C. Mayuga
- Camera setup: Multiple-camera setup
- Running time: 24–34 minutes
- Production company: GMA Entertainment TV

Original release
- Network: GMA Network
- Release: February 20 – April 28, 2006

Related
- Encantadia (2005); Etheria: Ang Ikalimang Kaharian ng Encantadia; Encantadia (2016); Encantadia Chronicles: Sang'gre

Encantadia: Pag-ibig Hanggang Wakas (transl. Encantadia: love until the end / international title: Avisala Encantadia: Love Until the End) is a 2006 Philippine television drama fantasy series broadcast by GMA Network. The series is the third instalment of the Encantadia franchise, and serves as a sequel to the television series Etheria: Ang Ikalimang Kaharian ng Encantadia. Directed by Gil Tejada Jr., it stars Sunshine Dizon, Iza Calzado, Karylle, Diana Zubiri and Dingdong Dantes. It premiered on February 20, 2006 on the network's Telebabad line up. The series concluded on April 28, 2006, with a total of 48 episodes.

The series is streaming online on YouTube.

== Premise ==
The sang'gres of Encantadia - Amihan, Pirena, Alena, and Danaya return from the past after they successfully destroyed the kingdom of Etheria. In the midst of their celebration in Sapiro, Mine-a arrives and warns the Sang’gres about an impending danger that only they can solve.

== Cast and characters ==
Cast

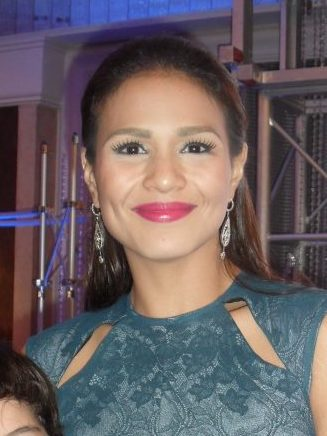
Iza Calzado

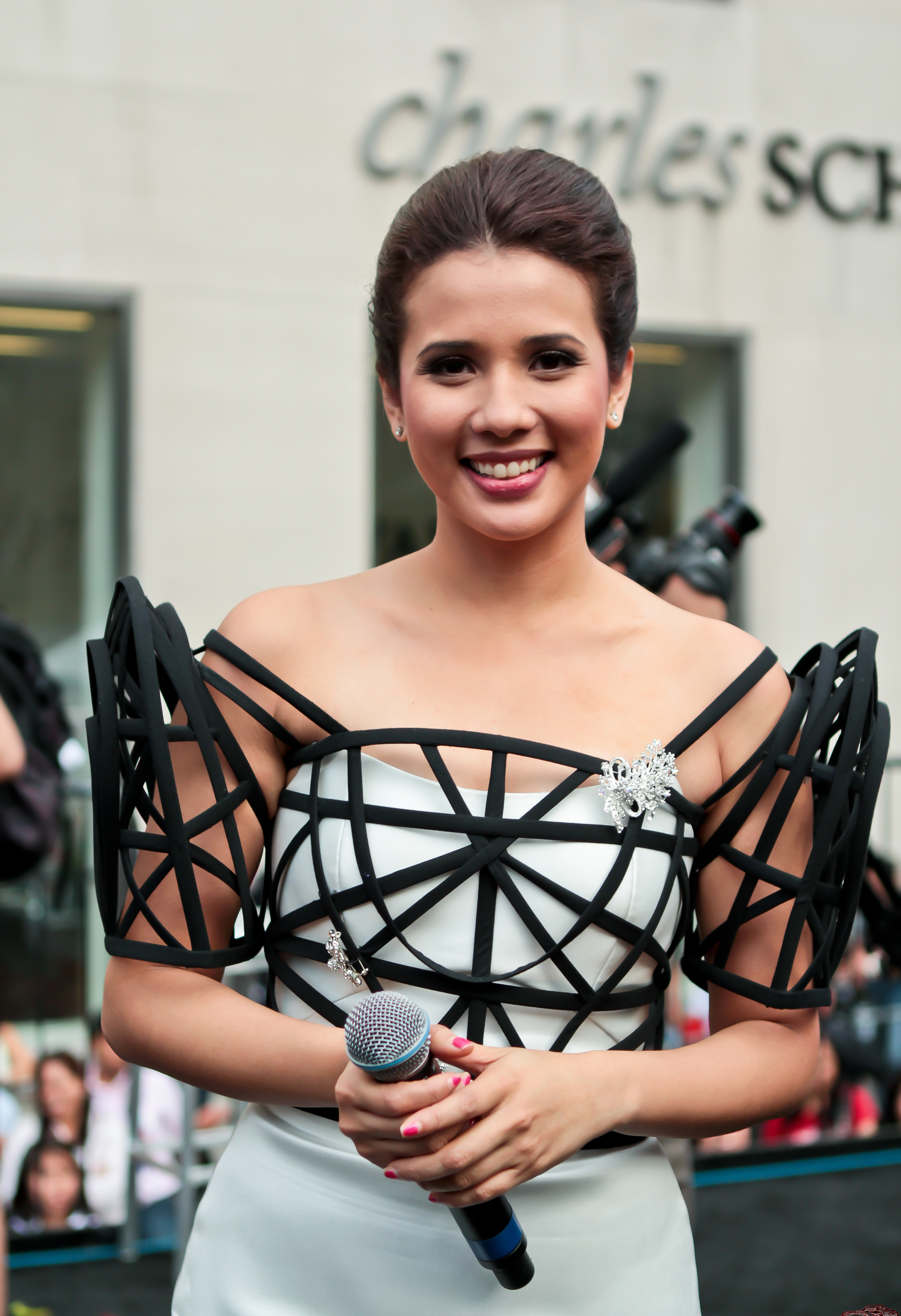
Karylle

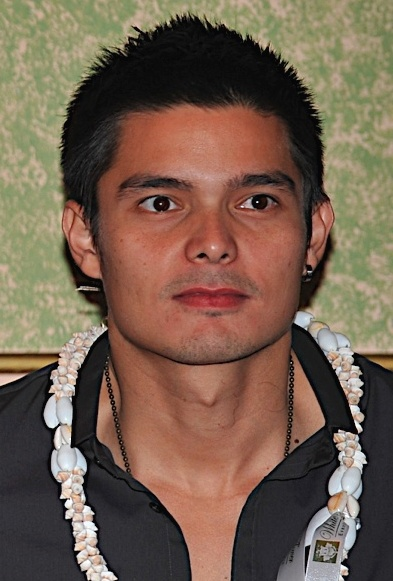
Dingdong Dantes

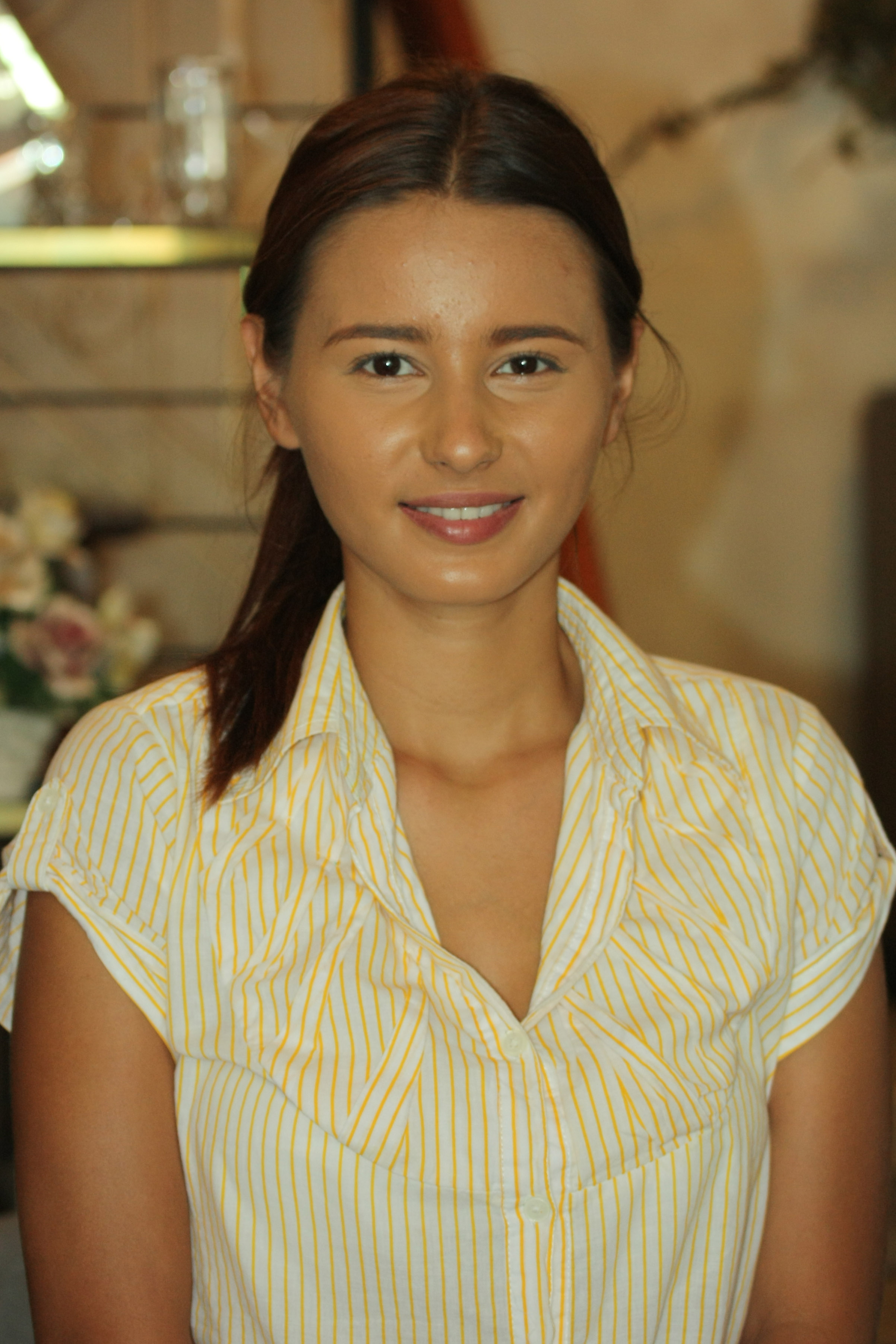
Jackie Rice

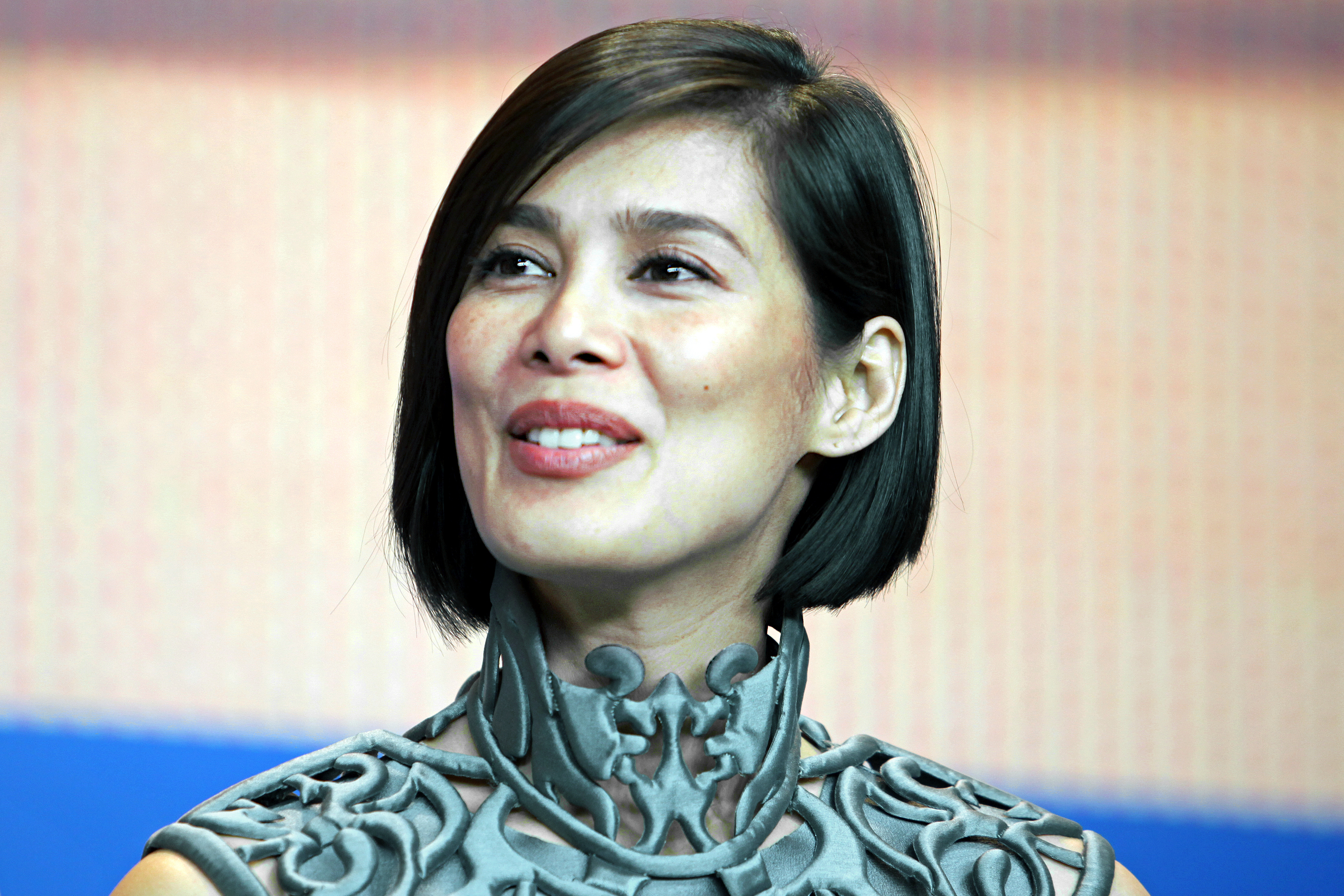
Angel Aquino

Lead cast

- Sunshine Dizon as Pirena
- Iza Calzado as Amihan
- Diana Zubiri as Danaya
- Karylle as Alena
- Dingdong Dantes as Ybrahim

Supporting cast

- Alessandra De Rossi as Andora
- Francine Prieto as Avria
- Jopay Paguia as Juvila
- Pauleen Luna as Odessa
- Jackie Rice as Armea
- Marky Cielo as Arman
- Pen Medina as Hagorn
- Angel Aquino as Ether
- Benjie Paras as Wahid
- Alfred Vargas as Aquil
- Jay R as Azulan
- Marky Lopez as Wantuk
- Justin Cuyugan as Arkrey
- Michael Roy Jornales as Apek
- Ella Guevara as Cassandra
- Kristine Gonzales as Violeta
- Katrina Gonzales as Luntian
- Marnie Lapuz as Rosas
- Arthur Solinap as Muros
- Raul Dillo as Kahel
- Noel Urbano as the voice of Imaw, Aegen and Dilawan

Guest cast

- Dawn Zulueta as Minea
- Cindy Kurleto as Cassiopea
- Jennylyn Mercado as Lira / Milagros
- Chinggoy Alonzo as Evades
- Raymond Bagatsing as Emre
- Cheska Iñigo as Galatea
- Geneva Cruz as Sari-a
- JM Reyes as younger Arman
- Richard Gomez as Raquim
- Precious Lara Quigaman as older Cassandra
