= Encantadia (2005 TV series) =

2005 Philippine television drama series

- Title card
- Genre: Fantasy drama
- Created by: Suzette Doctolero
- Written by: Suzette Doctolero; Joseph Balboa; Anna Aleta Nadela
- Directed by: Mark A. Reyes V
- Starring: Sunshine Dizon; Iza Calzado; Karylle; Diana Zubiri; Dingdong Dantes; Jennylyn Mercado
- Theme music composer: Tata Betita
- Country of origin: Philippines
- Original language: Tagalog
- No. of episodes: 160

Production
- Executive producers: Redgynn Alba; Mona C. Mayuga
- Camera setup: Multiple-camera setup
- Running time: 22–39 minutes
- Production company: GMA Entertainment TV

Original release
- Network: GMA Network
- Release: May 2 – December 9, 2005

Related
- Mulawin; Etheria: Ang Ikalimang Kaharian ng Encantadia; Mulawin: The Movie; Encantadia: Pag-ibig Hanggang Wakas; Encantadia (2016); Encantadia Chronicles: Sang'gre

Encantadia is a 2005 Philippine television drama fantasy series broadcast by GMA Network. The series is the first installment of the Encantadia franchise. Directed by Mark A. Reyes V, it stars Sunshine Dizon, Iza Calzado, Karylle, Diana Zubiri, Dingdong Dantes and Jennylyn Mercado. It premiered on May 2, 2005 on the network's Telebabad line up. The series concluded on December 9, 2005, with a total of 160 episodes.

The series is streaming online on YouTube. The sequel, Etheria: Ang Ikalimang Kaharian ng Encantadia aired in 2005.

== Premise ==
In the land of Encantadia, the Sang'gre sisters Alena, Danaya, Amihan and Pirena are designated guardians of four kingdoms within Encantadia. Trusted by the four gems that will keel the peace in the entire land. The ambition of Pirena will destroy this peace. It is one against three, it is sister against sisters.

== Cast and characters ==
Cast

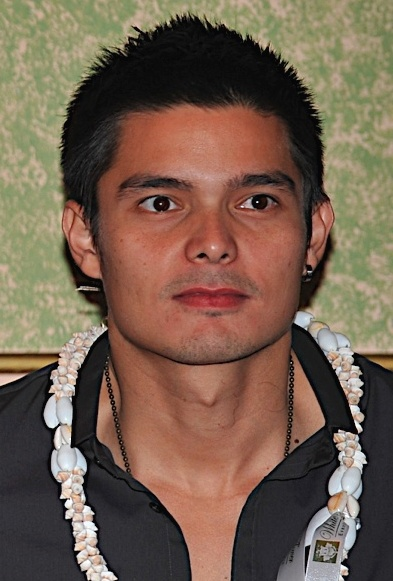
Dingdong Dantes

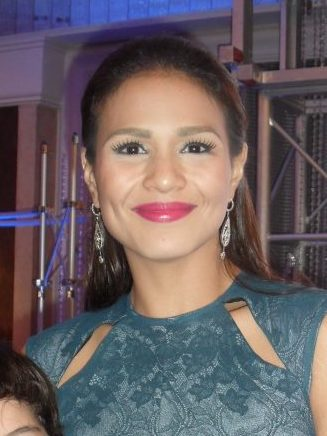
Iza Calzado

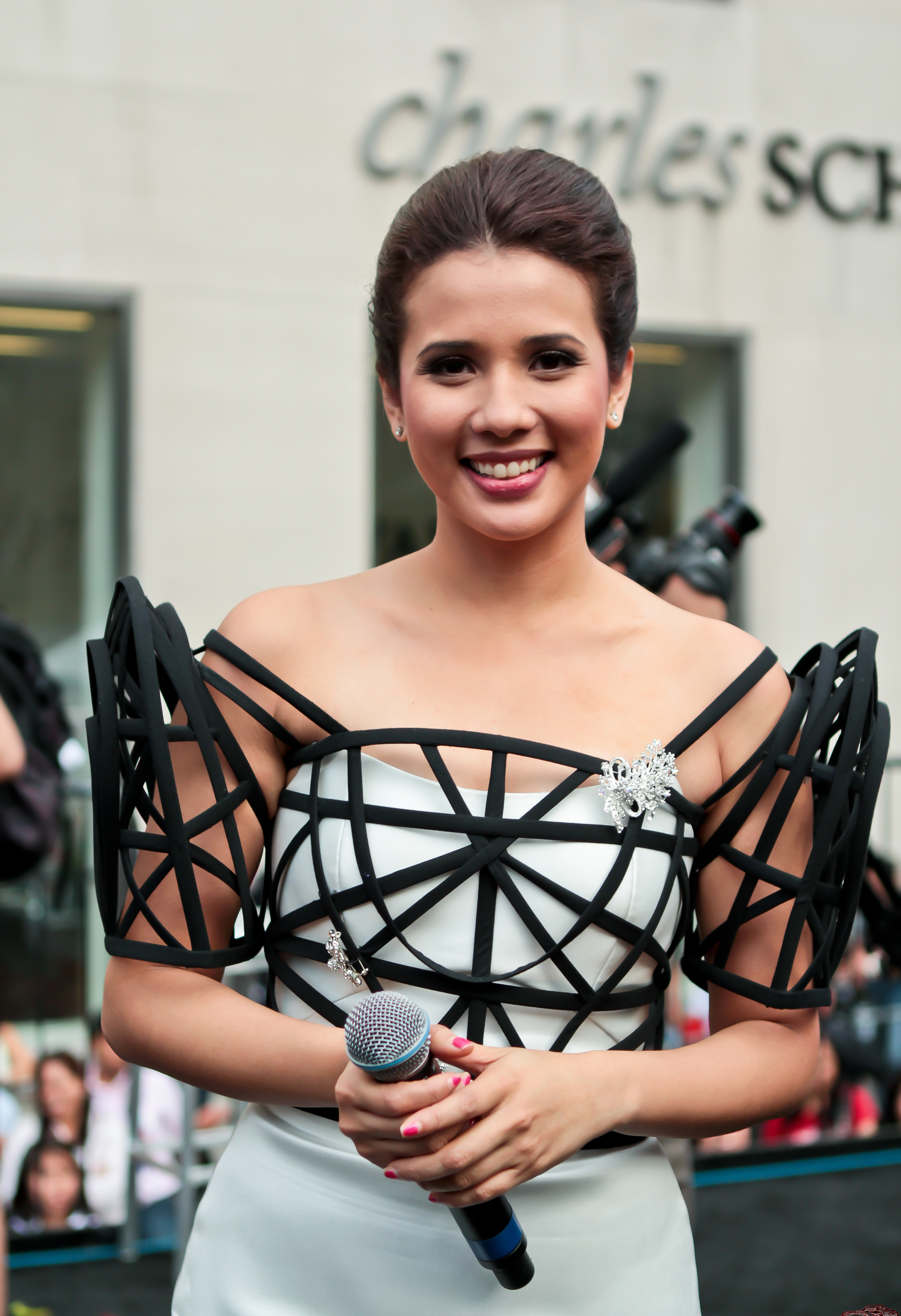
Karylle

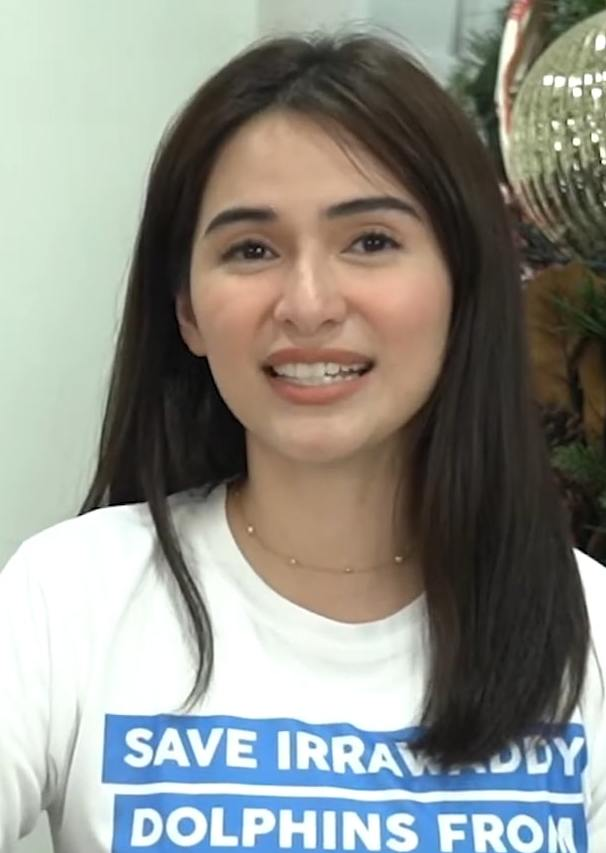
Jennylyn Mercado

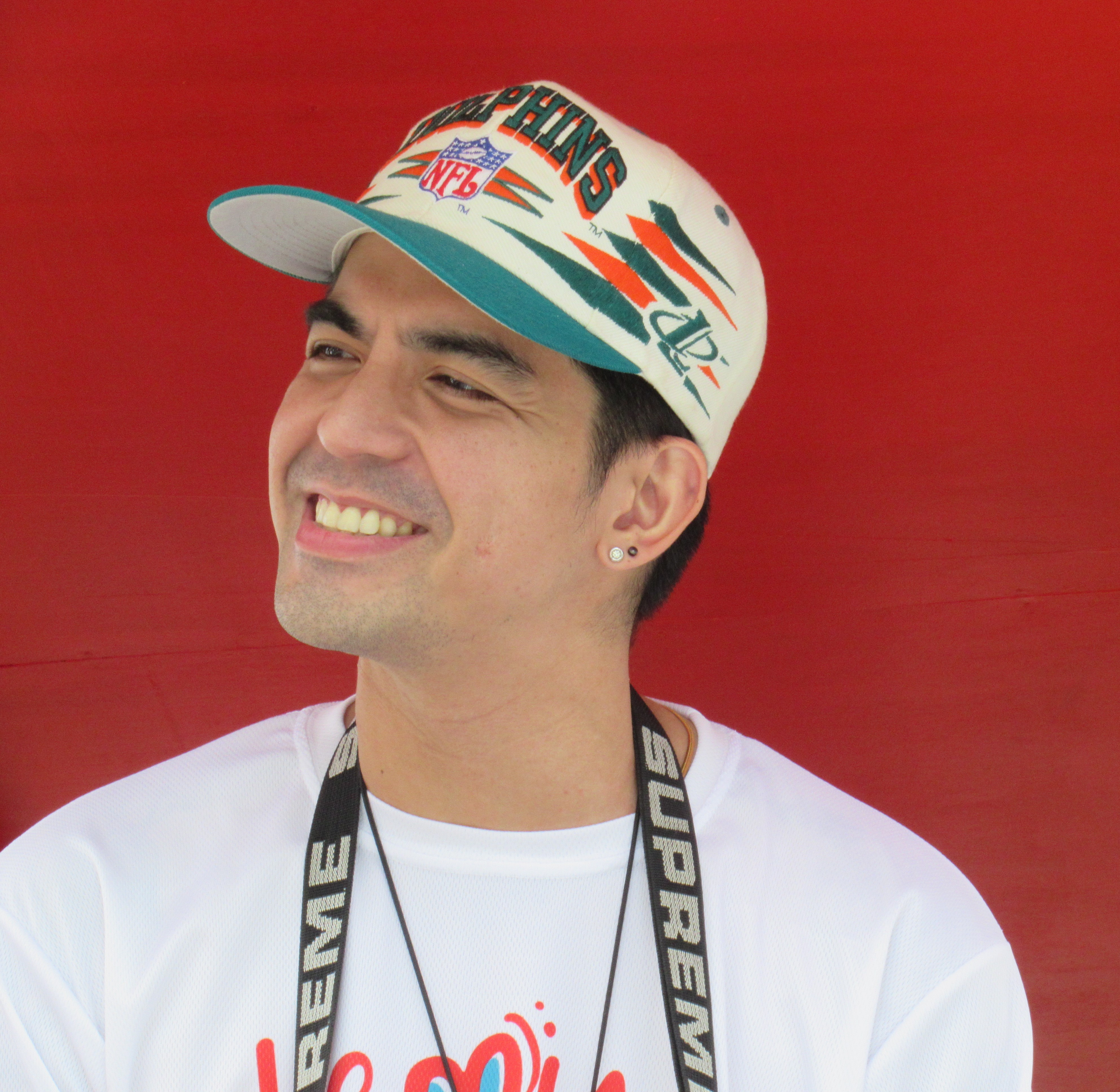
Mark Herras

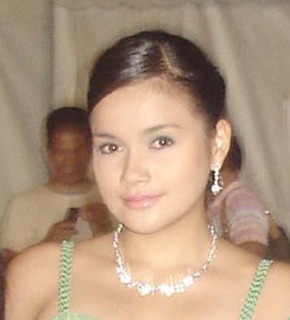
Yasmien Kurdi

Lead cast

- Dingdong Dantes as Ybarro / Ybrahim
- Sunshine Dizon as Pirena
- Iza Calzado as Amihan
- Karylle as Alena
- Diana Zubiri as Danaya
- Jennylyn Mercado as Lira / Milagros

Supporting cast

- Mark Herras as Anthony
- Yasmien Kurdi as Mira
- John Regala as Apitong
- Pinky Amador as Carmen
- Polo Ravales as Hitano
- Nancy Castiglione as Muyak
- Marky Lopez as Wantuk
- Alfred Vargas as Aquil
- Pen Medina as Hagorn
- Leila Kuzma as Agane
- Girlie Sevilla as Gurna
- Michael Roy Jornales as Apek
- Gayle Valencia as Dina
- Denise Laurel as Marge
- Ehra Madrigal as Gigi

Recurring cast

- Cindy Kurleto as Cassiopea
- Bobby Andrews as Asval
- Arthur Solinap as Muros
- Benjie Paras as Wahid

Guest cast

- Dawn Zulueta as Minea
- Richard Gomez as Raquim
- Al Tantay as Arvak
- Ian Veneracion as Armeo
- Allan Paule as Dado
- Miguel Faustman as Bathala
- Nicola Sermonia as younger Pirena
- Kristine Mangle as younger Amihan
- Abigael Arazo as younger Alena
- Julianne Gomez as younger Danaya
- Dominic Gacad as younger Apitong
- Phytos Ramirez as younger Anthony
- Irma Adlawan as Amanda
- Jay Aquitania as Banjo
- Brad Turvey as Axilom
- Gerard Pizzaras as Bandok
- Juliana Palermo as Lavanea
- Diane Sison as Mayne
- Romnick Sarmenta as Avilan
- Jake Cuenca as Kahlil
- Eddie Gutierrez as Dakila
- Zoren Legaspi as Bagwis
- Jey Gumiran as Cleu
- Antonio Aquitania as Alipato
- Sunshine Garcia as Agua
- Margaret Wilson as Aera
- Cheska Garcia as Aure
- Lloyd Barredo as Abog
- Vangie Labalan as Rosing
- Dino Guevarra as Carlos
- Juan Carlo Dizon as Chao
- CJ Ramos as Bono

== Accolades ==
Accolades received by Encantadia
Year	Award	Category	Recipient	Result	Ref.
2005	Asian Television Awards	Best Original Music Score: Highly Commended	Encantadia	Won	
2005	Golden Screen TV Awards	Outstanding Drama Series	Encantadia	Won	
2005	Golden Screen TV Awards	Outstanding Lead Actress	Sunshine Dizon	Won	
2005	Golden Screen TV Awards	Outstanding Supporting Actress in a Drama Series	Dawn Zulueta	Won	
2005	Golden Screen TV Awards	Outstanding Supporting Actor in a Drama Series	Pen Medina	Won	
2005	Golden Screen TV Awards	Outstanding Supporting Actor in a Drama Series	Alfred Vargas	Won	
2005	Golden Screen TV Awards	Outstanding Director for a Drama Series	Mark A. Reyes V Gil Tejada	Won	
2005	Gawad America Awards	Best TV Series/Soap Opera	Encantadia	Won	
2005	Gawad America Awards	Best Actress	Sunshine Dizon	Won	
2005	Gawad America Awards	Best Director	Mark A. Reyes V	Won	
2005	USTv Student's Choice Awards - University of Santo Tomas	Student's Choice of Drama Series	Encantadia	Won	
2005	USTv Student's Choice Awards - University of Santo Tomas	Student's Choice of Best Actress	Iza Calzado	Won	
2005	Guillermo Mendoza Memorial Scholarship Foundation Box-Office Entertainment Awards	Most Popular Television Program	Encantadia	Won	
2005	Guillermo Mendoza Memorial Scholarship Foundation Box-Office Entertainment Awards	Most Popular Television Director	Mark A. Reyes V Gil Tejada	Won	
2005	K-Zone Magazine	Most Favorite TV Show	Encantadia	Won	
2006	New York Festivals for Television Programming and Promotions	Best Lighting Category (finalist)	Encantadia	Won	
2006	iFM 93.9 Music Awards	Best Duet Performance	Karylle Jerome John Hughes	Won	
2006	20th PMPC Star Awards for Television	Best Primetime Drama Series	Encantadia	Nominated	
2006	20th PMPC Star Awards for Television	Best Drama Actress	Sunshine Dizon	Nominated	
2006	20th PMPC Star Awards for Television	Best New Male TV Personality	Marky Cielo	Nominated	

== Home media release ==
On March 4, 2008, GMA Records released the series on DVD. The series are divided into twelve volumes of DVDs.

== Reboot ==
In 2016, a reboot of the same title premiered in GMA Network. The lead roles were portrayed by Kylie Padilla, Gabbi Garcia, Sanya Lopez and Glaiza de Castro.
