= Francine Prieto =

Filipina actress and model (born 1982)

- Born: Anna Marie Falcon
- Occupations: Actress; model; host
- Years active: 1987–present
- Height: 1.85 m (6 ft 1 in)
- Spouse: Frank Shotkoski (m. 2016)

Anna Marie Falcon, known professionally as Francine Prieto, is a Filipino actress, fashion model, and radio DJ. She is of Chinese Filipino and Norwegian descent. She has been dubbed the "Sensuality Queen" by Philippine media due to early appearances in daring roles for Seiko Films.

== Education ==
Prieto studied B.S. Psychology at Adamson University, but was unable to finish her degree when she joined show business.

== Career ==
Prieto began her career in the entertainment industry at an early age when she entered Eat Bulaga!'s Little Miss Philippines in 1988, before becoming a member of That's Entertainment.

=== Modeling and pageantry ===
In her teen years, she showed the makings of a high-profile model and ventured into the modeling industry. At 13, she was fielded in the Elite Model Look Search Philippines 1994 (formerly Look of the Year) and emerged as one of the finalists, where top model Linda Evangelista flew to Manila to judge the search. Prieto, then known as Anna Marie Falcon, did ramp modeling and photoshoots with her stunning Eurasian features towering at 5 feet 10 inches (1.78 m).

A professional model at 14, she joined Bodyshots Philippines and finished as the runner-up. Joining the competition opened more opportunities for her in the modeling world for years. Prieto represented the Philippines at Miss South East Asia Peninsula International where she finished 2nd runner-up. In 2003, she entered Binibining Pilipinas, but managed to only crack the Top 12 despite doing well in the competition. Prieto then screened as a candidate for Mutya ng Pilipinas 2003, but eventually dropped her plans of entering after being offered a contract by then-giant production outfit, Seiko Films.

Prieto was the cover girl for FHM on three occasions in November 2003, October 2006, and volume 3 of its annual edition The Girls of FHM, and was constantly featured on their 100 Sexiest Women list.

In 2010, Prieto became the model and face of Ever Bilena Cosmetics.

=== Acting ===
Being a former cast member of That's Entertainment, Prieto appeared in her first TV project entitled Criselda on ABC (now TV5). Prieto did several daring roles for Seiko Films together with Diana Zubiri. Her biggest break came when she played Queen Avria in Etheria, the second book of Encantadia. She has also done comic roles in Bubble Gang, where she became one of the mainstays. Around the same time, she played Queen Kuran, a villainess in Kamandag, and a supporting role in Codename: Asero as Aureana. In early 2009, she played Sheila, one of the villains in Ang Babaeng Hinugot sa Aking Tadyang. In the same year, she continued playing villainous roles in Mars Ravelo's Darna as Lucifera, ang Babaeng Tuod, alongside Marian Rivera in the titular role.

After being with GMA-7 for several years, she terminated her contract in 2010, and switched to rival network ABS-CBN although was non-exclusive. Her first role was Mrs. Smith in Kung Tayo'y Magkakalayo. She then played vampire co-revolutionary leader Imelda Fontanilla in the supernatural thriller series Imortal. She played one of the main roles in Precious Hearts Romances Presents: Alyna as Aida Natividad/Mira Fuentes, returning later on in the series.

In 2016, Prieto returned to GMA Network and had a part in the teleserye Oh, My Mama!

=== Radio ventures ===
Aside from being an actress, she was a radio presenter at the DZMM TeleRadyo program Ka-Date together with Bobby Yan, which also aired on DZMM 630 simultaneously.

== Personal life ==
On March 26, 2010, Prieto's mother Amelia Falcon died at age 54 from ovarian cancer. Prieto has a paternal younger half-sister who lives in Norway, as well as a maternal older half-brother, and three more younger half-siblings from her stepfather.

In 2015, Prieto became engaged to American molecular biologist Frank Shotkoski. The couple married a year later.

== Filmography ==
=== Television / Digital Series ===
Year	Title	Role	Notes	Source			
1988	Little Miss Philippines on Eat Bulaga!	Herself / Contestant					
1992	Criselda	Criselda					
1993–1996	That's Entertainment	Herself / Performer					
2001–2002	Wow						
2003–2004	All Together Now	–					
2005	Love to Love	Various Roles					
2005–2010	Bubble Gang	Herself					
2005–2006	Etheria: Ang Ikalimang Kaharian ng Encantadia	Reyna Avria					
2006	Encantadia: Pag-ibig Hanggang Wakas	Reyna Avria					
2006	Fantastikids	Armana					
2006	Magpakailanman	Various Roles					
2006–2007	Bongga Ka Star	Herself / Host					
2007	Bahay Mo Ba 'To?	Jingle					
2007–2008	Carlo J. Caparas' Kamandag	Reyna Kuran†					
2008	E.S.P.	Ivy					
2008	Codename: Asero	Aureana					
2009	Ang Babaeng Hinugot sa Aking Tadyang	Sheila					
2009	Mars Ravelo's Darna	Lucifera / Babaeng Tuod					
2009	Sana Ngayong Pasko	Aisha Dionisio					
2010	Kung Tayo'y Magkakalayo	Olivia Smith					
2010	Precious Hearts Romances Presents: Alyna	Aida Natividad / Mira Fuentes					
2010	Imortal	Imelda Fontanilla					
2012–2013	Ina, Kapatid, Anak	Martina Lagdameo			2013	Show Up!	Herself / Host
2014	Trenderas	Viveka					
2015	2½ Daddies	Mrs. Kurosawa					
2015	Flordeliza	Grace Magtanggol					
2016	Carlo J. Caparas' Ang Panday	Rosanna F. Yambao					
2016	Dolce Amore	Claudia Buenaventura					
2016	Oh, My Mama!	Loresca Ganzon					
2016	Till I Met You	Catherine					
2017	Ipaglaban Mo!	Lanie	Episode Guest Title: "Laro"; Credited as Francine Prieto				
2017–2018	Haplos	Mercedes "Cedes" Bermudez-Alonzo					
2018	Daig Kayo ng Lola Ko	Mahal na Reyna	Episode title: "Si Princess Frances, at ang Gisantes"; Credited as Francine Prieto				
2018	Daig Kayo ng Lola Ko	Mama	Episode title: "Ex-B Academy"; Credited as Francine Prieto				
2018	Daig Kayo ng Lola Ko	Mama	Episode title: "Nonoy, ang Santang Pinoy"; Credited as Francine Prieto				
2019	Hanggang sa Dulo ng Buhay Ko	Mercedes "Mercy" De Jesus-Calderon					
2022	First Lady	Former First Lady Soledad Cortez					
2025	FPJ’s Batang Quiapo	Harrietta Zialcita-Valderama					

=== Film ===
Year	Title	Role	Note
1990	Hindi Laruan ang Puso	–	Credited as Anna Marie Falcon
1991	Darna	Young Narda	Credited as Anna Marie Falcon
1993	Ligaw- ligawan, Kasal-kasalan, Bahay-bahayan	Beautiful Adelaide	Credited as Anna Marie Falcon
1993	Divine Mercy: Sa Buhay ni Sister Faustina	Wanda	Credited as Anna Marie Falcon
1994	Sobra Talaga... Overr!!!	–	Credited as Anna Marie Falcon
1996	Patikim ng Pinya	–	Credited as Anna Marie Falcon
1996	Tukso Layuan Mo Ako 2	–	Credited as Anna Marie Falcon
1997	Thalia	–	Credited as Anna Marie Falcon
1997	Imbestigasyon Kay Lolita Macarena	–	Credited as Anna Marie Falcon
1997	Abuso: Case #6433	–	Credited as Anna Marie Falcon
2003	Liberated	Trixie	
2004	Liberated 2	Janelle	
2005	Bikini Open	Lara Lopez	
2006	Bridal Shower	Sonia	
2007	Silip	Celia	
2007	Enteng Kabisote 4: Okay Ka, Fairy Ko... The Beginning of the Legend	Beng / Dragon Lady	
2008	Iskul Bukol 20 Years After: The Ungasis and Escaleras Adventure	Brenda	
2009	Oh, My Girl! A Laugh Story...		Cameo
2011	My House Husband: Ikaw Na!	Tessie	
2014	Feng Shui 2	–	
2018	Ang Pambansang Third Wheel	Mary	

=== Radio ===
Year	Title
2010–2011	About Me & You
2011	Ka-Date
2012–2013	Xtra Xervice
