= Encantadia Chronicles: Sang'gre =

Philippine television drama series

- Title card
- Genre: Fantasy drama
- Based on: Encantadia by Suzette Doctolero
- Written by: Suzette Doctolero; Anna Aleta Nadela; Jake Somera; Ays de Guzman
- Directed by: Rico Gutierrez; Enzo Williams
- Creative directors: Aloy Adlawan; R.J. Nuevas; Ricky Lee
- Starring: Bianca Umali
- Opening theme: "Bagong Tadhana" by Julie Anne San Jose
- Country of origin: Philippines
- Original language: Tagalog
- No. of episodes: 233

Production
- Production locations: Botolan, Zambales
- Camera setup: Multiple-camera setup
- Running time: 22–35 minutes
- Production company: GMA Entertainment Group

Original release
- Network: GMA Network
- Release: June 16, 2025 – May 8, 2026

Related
- Encantadia (2005); Etheria: Ang Ikalimang Kaharian ng Encantadia; Encantadia: Pag-ibig Hanggang Wakas; Encantadia (2016)

Encantadia Chronicles: Sang'gre is a Philippine television drama fantasy series broadcast by GMA Network. The series serves as a spin-off to the Philippine television drama series Encantadia (2016). Directed by Rico Gutierrez and Enzo Williams, it stars Bianca Umali in the title role. It premiered on June 16, 2025, on the network's Prime line up. The series concluded on May 8, 2026, with a total of 233 episodes.

The series is streaming online on YouTube.

== Premise ==
A young girl grows up in the world of the mortals, unknowingly she is the lost offspring of Sang'gre Danaya – the queen of Encantadia.

== Cast and characters ==
Cast

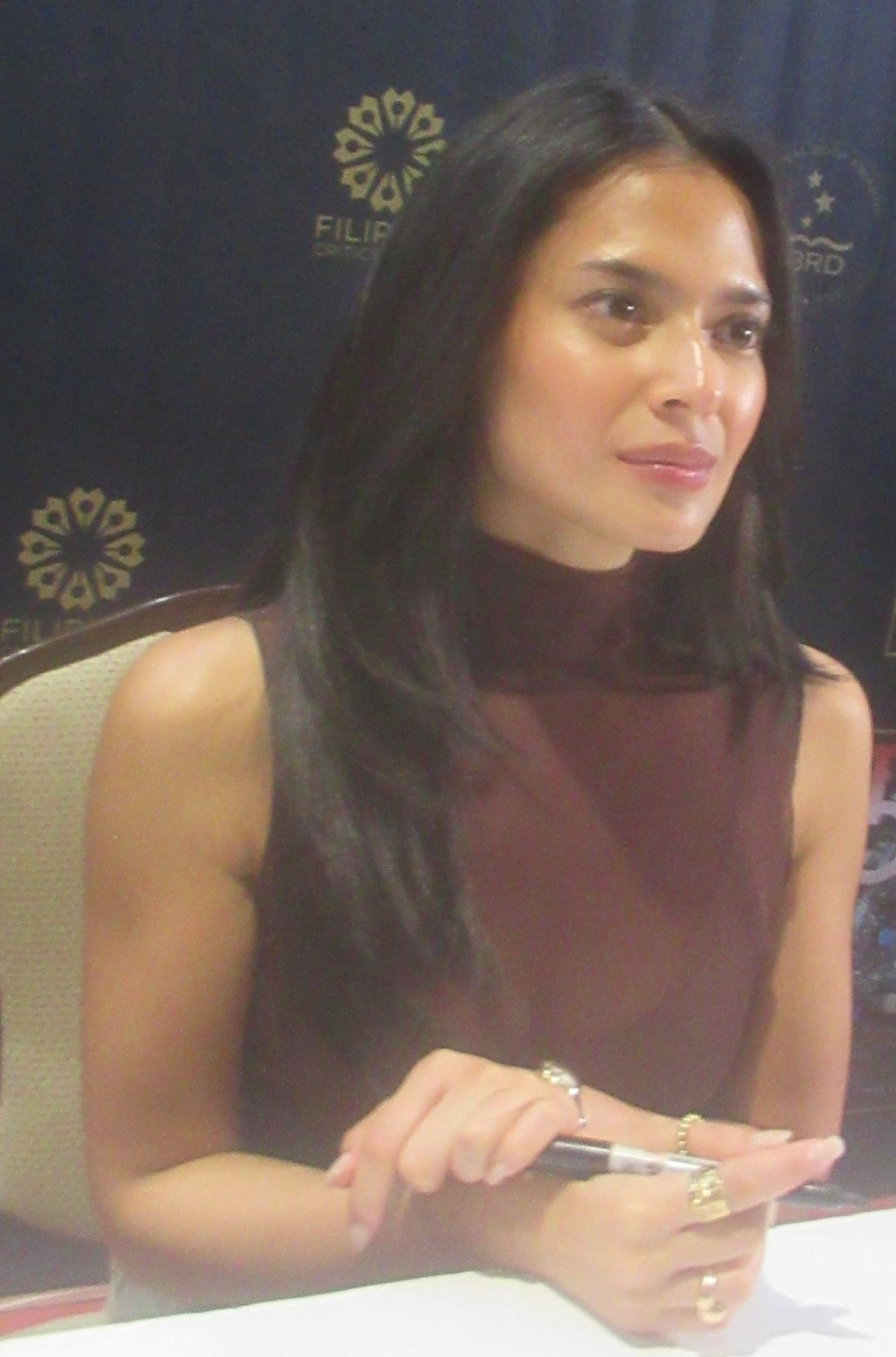
Bianca Umali

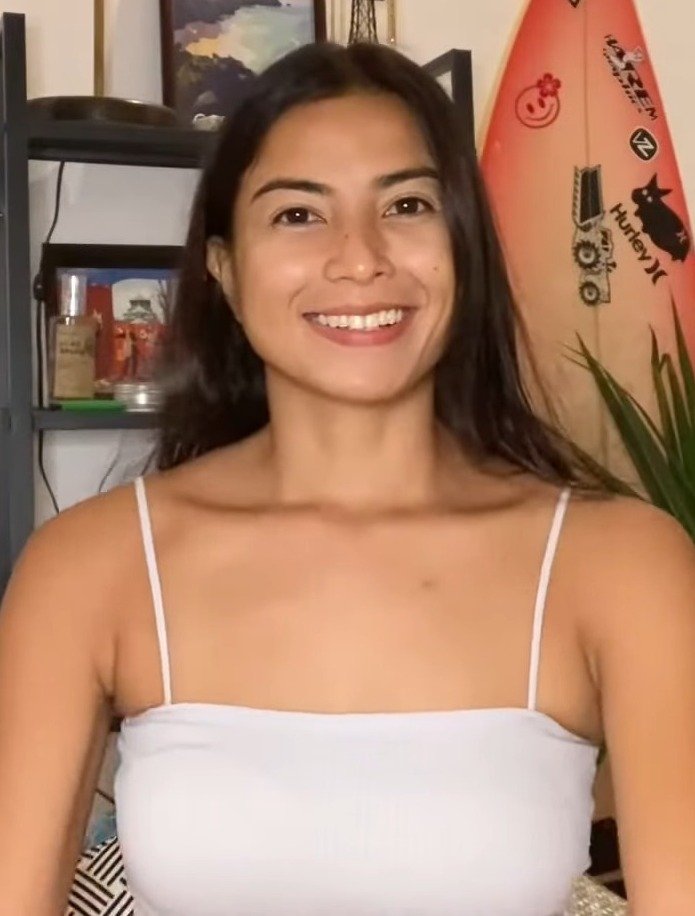
Glaiza de Castro

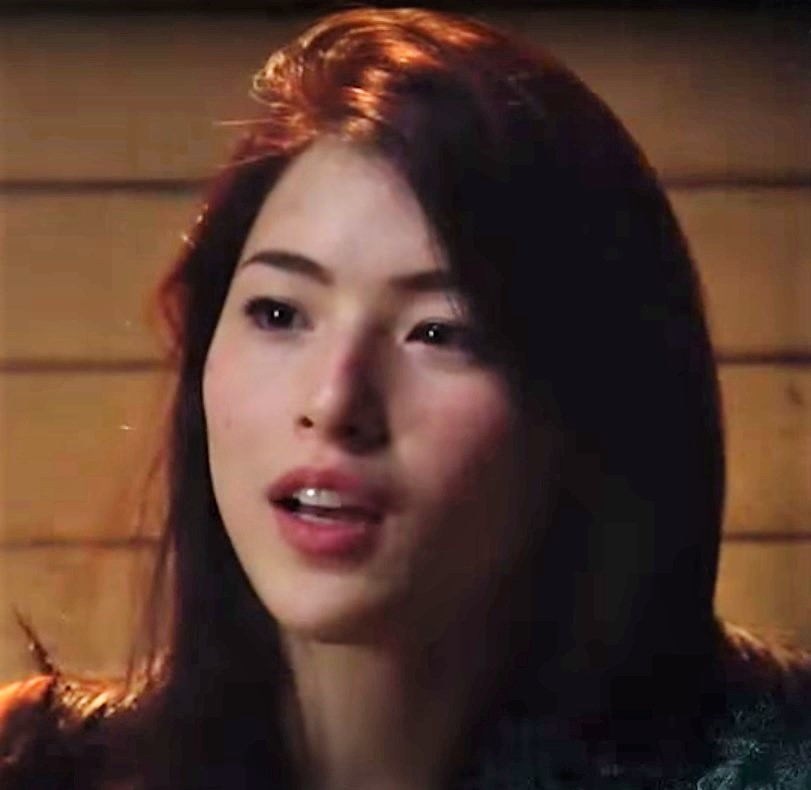
Kylie Padilla

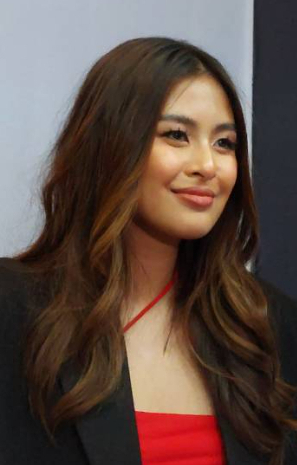
Gabbi Garcia

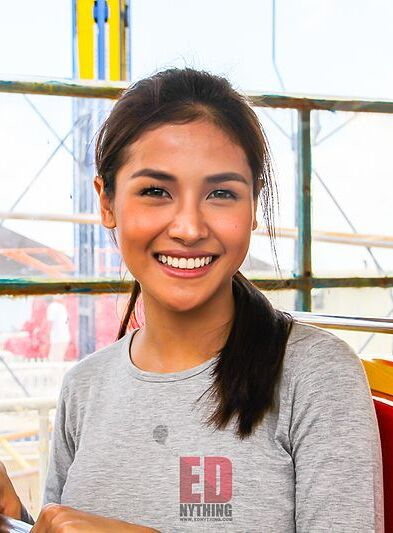
Sanya Lopez

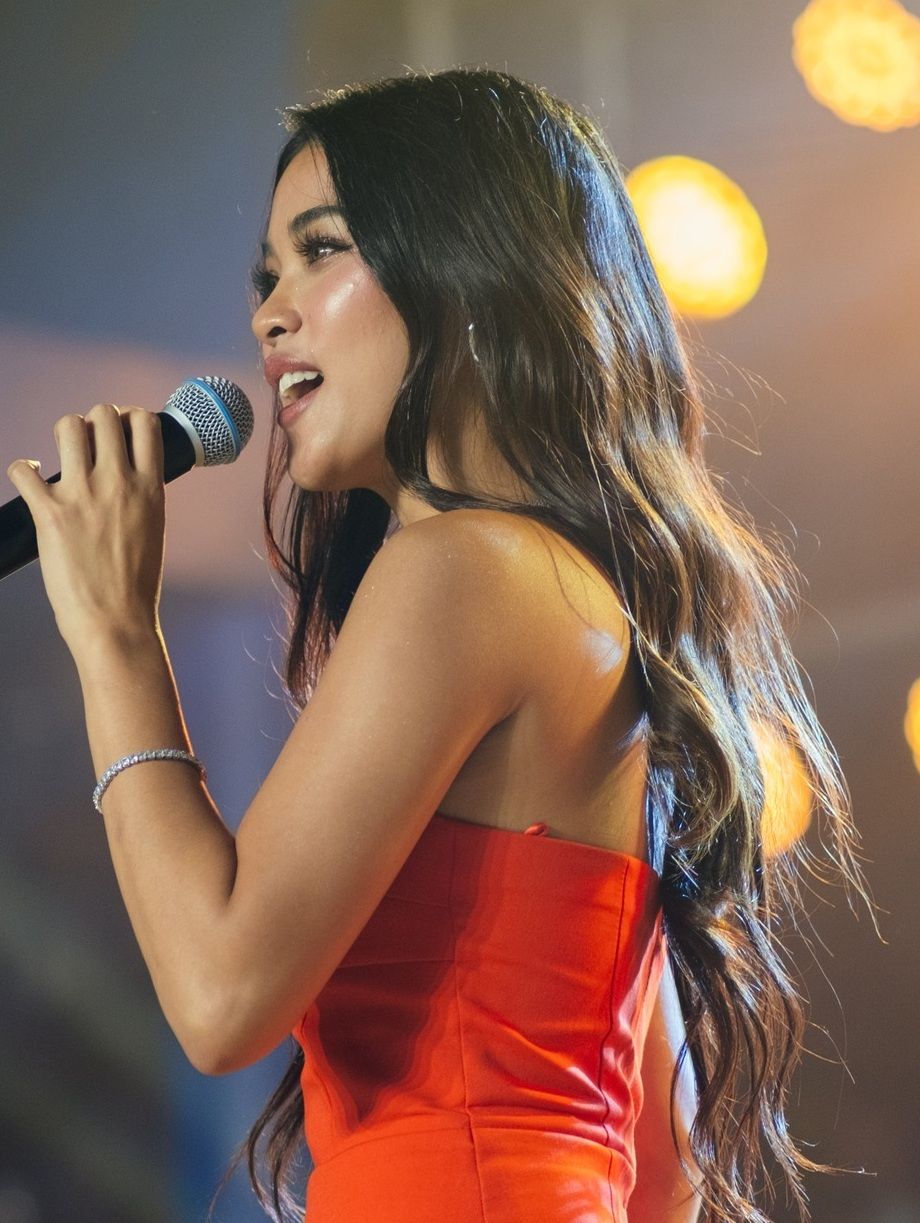
Shuvee Etrata

Lead cast

- Bianca Umali as Terra

Supporting cast

- Faith da Silva as Flamarra
- Angel Guardian as Deia
- Kelvin Miranda as Adamus
- Rhian Ramos as Mitena
- Bianca Manalo as Olgana
- Sherilyn Reyes-Tan as Katrina Salvador
- Manilyn Reynes as Mona Reyes
- Gabby Eigenmann as Zaur
- Boboy Garovillo as Javier Reyes
- Benjie Paras as Kapre
- Jamie Wilson as Ednu
- Therese Malvar as Dina Villaroman
- Vince Maristela as Akiro Nuñez
- Jon Lucas as Daron
- Shuvee Etrata as Veshdita
- Pam Prinster and Rere Madrid as Camille "Cami" Salvador
- Luis Hontiveros as Soldarius
- Cheska Inigo as Mayca
- Billie Hakenson as Kosshava
- Hailey Dizon
- Vito Gueco as Mantuk
- Kiel Gueco as Tukman
- Ricky Davao as Emilio "Emil" Salvador
- Mika Salamanca as Anaca
- Matt Lozano
- Paolo Paraiso
- Shiela Marie Rodriguez
- Moi Bien
- Lotlot Bustamante
- Heath Jornales as Caleb Salvador

Guest cast

- Sienna Stevens as younger Mitena
- Sanya Lopez as Danaya
- Glaiza de Castro as Pirena
- Kylie Padilla as Amihan
- Gabbi Garcia as Alena
- Ruru Madrid as Ybrahim
- Rocco Nacino as Aquil
- Solenn Heussaff as Cassiopea
- Noel Urbano as Imaw's voice
- Nesthy Petecio
- Mikee Quintos as Lira
- Kate Valdez as Mira
- Martin del Rosario
- Michelle Dee as Cassandra
- Derrick Monasterio as Almiro
- Elle Villanueva as Agua
- Ysabel Ortega as Armea
- Lexi Gonzales as Sari-a
- Buboy Villar as Wantuk
- Radson Flores as Avilan
- Wendell Ramos as Memen
- Ashley Rivera
- Maxine Medina as Ornia
- Carlo Gonzales as Muros
- Marx Topacio as Azulan
- Jay Ortega as Alipato
- Skye Chua
- Larkin Castor
- Brianna Bunagan
- Cassandra Lavarias as Gaiea
- Justin De Dios as Ec'naad
- Diana Zubiri as Harahen
- Gazini Ganados as Celebes
- Patricia Tumulak as Erenea
- Ina Feleo as Lavanea
- Ryan Yllana as Paopao
- John Arcilla as Hagorn
- Rochelle Pangilinan as Agane
- Tom Rodriguez as Gargan
- Janice Hung as Ether
- Elias J TV as Elias
- Ahtisa Manalo as Haliya

== Development ==
Encantadia is a 2005 Philippine television series broadcast by GMA Network. Created by Suzette Doctolero, it starred Sunshine Dizon, Iza Calzado, Karylle, Diana Zubiri, Dingdong Dantes and Jennylyn Mercado. The series led to two television series, Etheria: Ang Ikalimang Kaharian ng Encantadia (2005–06) and Encantadia: Pag-ibig Hanggang Wakas (2006) which both served as sequels. In 2016, a reboot television series premiered, under the same title. It starred Glaiza de Castro, Kylie Padilla, Gabbi Garcia and Sanya Lopez. On December 31, 2021, the television series Encantadia Chronicles: Sang'gre was announced for a 2022 release for GMA Network, acting as a spin-off to the reboot series. On December 29, 2023, the series was delayed to 2024.

=== Pre-production ===
The series is written by Doctolero. R.J. Nuevas serves as the creative director. Screenwriters Ricky Lee, Anna Aleta Nadela, Jake Somera, Ays de Guzman and program manager Ali Nokom-Dedicatoria are also a part of the production team. Initially Mark A. Reyes was hired as the director and later left the series in November 2024. Rico Gutierrez and Enzo Williams served as his replacement.

== Casting ==
In October 2023, Filipino actress Bianca Umali's photo from the series was released at San Diego Comic-Con. Filipino actor Kelvin Miranda and Filipino actresses Faith da Silva and Angel Guardian were announced in the same month. In November, Filipino actress Rhian Ramos was cast as the series' villainess, Mitena.

== Production ==
Principal photography commenced in October 2023. Filming concluded on April 14, 2026 in Botolan, Zambales.

== Ratings ==
According to AGB Nielsen Philippines' Nationwide Urban Television Audience Measurement People in television homes, the pilot episode of Encantadia Chronicles: Sang'gre earned a 13.7% rating. The final episode scored an 11.5% rating.
