= Chinggoy Alonzo =

Filipino actor (born 1950)

- Born: Ramón Alonzo; July 22, 1950; Philippines
- Died: October 15, 2017 (aged 67); Manila, Philippines
- Other names: Chingoy, Chinggoy Gil
- Occupation: Actor
- Years active: 1979–2017

Ramón "Chinggoy" Alonzo (Tagalog: [tʃɪnˈgoɪ ɐˈlɔnsɔ]; July 22, 1950 – October 15, 2017) was a Filipino actor in theater, movies, and television. He was nominated for FAMAS Award Best Supporting Actor in Ikaw Naman ang Iiyak (1996).

== Career ==
Alonzo was active in the theater industry since the 1960s as an actor and stage director, including work with repertory group The Company of Players.

He appeared in several films such as Dito Sa Pitong Gatang (1992), Sana Pag-ibig Na (1998), and Linlang (1999).

He played Don Ramón, the father of Dingdong Dantes' character in the drama series Sana ay Ikaw na Nga (2002), and the father of Iza Calzado's character in the 2006 film Moments of Love. He was known for portraying the character Evades in the fantasy series Encantadia. Recently, he also appeared in the historical epic series Indio (2013).

His last television appearance was in the revenge drama series Wildflower (2017), where he played the role of Senator Pablo Alcantara, the father of Roxanne Barcelo's character Natalie.

== Personal life ==
His son Ralion Alonzo is also a Filipino actor now working in Hong Kong Disneyland playing multiple roles in Disney Revue and as a lead actor in Mulan, while his other son Shark Alonzo is a stage actor who played as Troy Bolton in High School Musical (2006) at the Ateneo de Manila University's Gonzaga Hall Fine Arts Theater.

== Death ==
Alonzo died on October 15, 2017, from colon cancer. He was 67.

== Filmography ==
=== Film ===
| Year | Title | Role |
|---|---|---|
| 1979 | Buhay Artista Ngayon | |
| 1996 | Ikaw Naman ang Iiyak | Leandro Salvacion |
| 1996 | Where 'D' Girls 'R' | |
| 2001 | Tusong Twosome | Don Segundo |
| 2003 | Ngayong Nandito Ka | Teddy Cervantes |
| 2004 | Mano Po 2: My Home | Sol's father |
| 2004 | Kuya | Ted's father |
| 2004 | Santa Santita | Fr. Pascual |
| 2006 | Moments of Love | Senyor Andres Miguel Buenacer |
| 2007 | Resiklo | Mayor |
| 2008 | Sisa | Don Rafael Ibarra |
| 2008 | One True Love | Atty. Julian Mijares |
| 2009 | I Love You, Goodbye | Dr. Eduardo Vicencio |
| 2010 | You to Me Are Everything | Frank Benitez Jr. |
| 2010 | Rosario | Tenant |
| 2011 | My Valentine Girls | Grandpa Teryo |
| 2012 | The Healing | Dodi |
| 2015 | Etiquette for Mistresses | Ramon |

=== Television ===
| Year | Title | Role | Notes |
|---|---|---|---|
| 1996 | Anna Karenina | Don Xernan Monteclaro | Supporting role |
| 2000 | Pangako Sa 'Yo | General | Guest |
| 2002 | Sana ay Ikaw na Nga | Don Ramon Altamonte | Supporting role |
| 2003 | Sana'y Wala Nang Wakas | Don Marcelo Madrigal | Guest |
| 2005 | Ang Mahiwagang Baul | Don Selmo | Episode: "Ang Lihim ng Bolang Apoy" |
| 2005 | Encantadia | Evades | Supporting role |
| 2005 | Etheria: Ang Ikalimang Kaharian ng Encantadia | Evades | Supporting role |
| 2005 | Now and Forever: Mukha | Miguel / Manuel | Supporting role |
| 2006 | Encantadia: Pag-ibig Hanggang Wakas | Evades | Special participation |
| 2006 | I Luv NY | Johnny | Supporting role |
| 2006 | Carlo J. Caparas' Bakekang | Rod | Guest |
| 2006 | Bituing Walang Ningning | Lauro Calma | Supporting role |
| 2006 | Love Spell | Ericka's father | Episode: "Charm & Crystal" |
| 2006 | Sa Piling Mo | Congressman Chuatoco | Supporting role |
| 2008 | Codename: Asero | Chairman Walden | Supporting role |
| 2008 | Ako si Kim Samsoon | Mr. Sandoval | Guest |
| 2008 | Mars Ravelo's Dyesebel | Don Ernesto Montemayor | Supporting role |
| 2008 | Iisa Pa Lamang | Don Amadeo Castillejos | Guest |
| 2008 | Lobo | Mr. Blancaflor | Guest |
| 2009 | Precious Hearts Romances Presents: The Bud Brothers Series | Mr. Yulo | Guest |
| 2009 | The Wedding | Orson Garcintorena | Supporting role |
| 2009 | Dahil May Isang Ikaw | Don Fernando Aragon | Supporting role |
| 2009 | May Bukas Pa | Manolo Sandoval | Guest |
| 2010 | Claudine | Cara's father | Episode: "Doble Cara" |
| 2010 | Your Song | Fernando | Episode: "Love Me, Love You" |
| 2010 | Diva | Martin's father | Guest |
| 2010 | Precious Hearts Romances Presents: Kristine | Don Cesar Zaragoza | Guest |
| 2010 | Jillian: Namamasko Po | Don Victor | Guest |
| 2011 | 100 Days to Heaven | Mr. Villanueva | Guest |
| 2011 | Sabel | Father John | Supporting role |
| 2011 | I Heart You, Pare! | Carlos Romualdez | Supporting role |
| 2011 | Guns and Roses | Don Soliven | Guest |
| 2011 | Wansapanataym | Mr. Peralta | Episode: "My Mumu" |
| 2011 | Wansapanataym | Neo | Episode: "Happy Neo Year" |
| 2012 | E-Boy | Jaime Mariano | Supporting role |
| 2012 | The Good Daughter | Don Manuel Noche | Guest |
| 2013 | Indio | Don Hernando Pelaez | Supporting role |
| 2013 | My Little Juan | Manolo Domingo | Guest |
| 2013 | Got to Believe | Ronaldo San Juan | Supporting role |
| 2014 | Strawberry Lane | Don Don | Guest |
| 2014 | Ang Lihim ni Annasandra | Don Wilfredo Armada | Guest |
| 2014 | Moon of Desire | Robert Herrera | Supporting role |
| 2014 | Sana Bukas pa ang Kahapon | Henry Buenavista | Special participation |
| 2015 | Princess in the Palace | Sen. Carlos Jacinto | Guest |
| 2015 | You're My Home | Ferdinand Vasquez | Guest |
| 2016 | Hahamakin ang Lahat | Don Ericson Tan | Supporting role |
| 2017 | Wildflower | Sen. Pablo Alcantara (Last TV appearance) | Supporting role |
