= Suzette Doctolero =

Filipina screenwriter (born 1968)

- Born: Suzette Doctolero y Sévero; December 15, 1968 (age 57); Calabanga, Camarines Sur Province, Philippines
- Education: Polytechnic University of the Philippines
- Occupation: Screenwriter
- Years active: 1987–present
- Employer: GMA Network
- Television: Encantadia; Amaya; Indio

Suzette Sévero Doctolero (born December 15, 1968) is a Filipina screenwriter for film and television. She is best known for being the creator of Encantadia in 2005 and the succeeding related television series including the Encantadia 2016 reboot. She is mostly credited as screenwriter, series creator and creative consultant for GMA Network. Her other works include Amaya, Indio and My Husband's Lover. She also wrote the story for the film Let the Love Begin and became the creative consultant for the television series Alyas Robin Hood and Destined to be Yours.

== Biography ==
Suzette Severo Doctolero was raised in Calabanga, Camarines Sur Province and she is the granddaughter of Buenviges Narvadez, a Filipino comedienne and actress in the 1930s. She studied high school at José Rizal College (which later became José Rizal University) and went to college at the Polytechnic University of the Philippines (PUP) on different courses. She first took an accounting course, then clinical psychology and lastly bachelor of arts in Filipino. When she was in PUP, she joined theater groups Dulaang Kalayaan and Dulaang Bonificacio where she portrayed Gregoria de Jesus in one of the plays.

Aged 18 in 1987, Doctolero's adviser, Angie Ferro, hired her as production assistant for Balintataw TV. After her stint at Balintataw TV, she tried to write romantic novels and with the help of Lualhati Bautista, her work entitled Ako si Alex, Babae (I'm Alex, a Woman) was published by Anvil Publishing. In the 1990s, Doctolero ventured in selling her works to different publishers, head writers, editors and producers. She also contributed to the story writing of Viva Television shows.

In the later part of her career, Doctolero became a screenwriter for television series of GMA Network. She is one of the writers of Kirara, Ano Ang Kulay ng Pag-ibig? and Sana Ay Ikaw Na Nga. Encantadia is her very first project as head writer and her first work in the telefantasya genre, which she created for GMA Network. Her other credited works for GMA Network include Amaya, Indio and My Husband's Lover. She also wrote the script for some of the episodes of Daisy Siete, which was produced by Focus Entertainment and shown also in GMA Network. She also wrote scripts for the television adaptation of Lupin, Joaquin Bordado, Totoy Bato, Gagambino and Panday Kids but most of these series did not get high ratings, thus, she no longer wrote adaptations. For her film credits, she wrote the screenplay for Let the Love Begin and Bahay Kubo: A Pinoy Mano Po!.

In 2016, Doctolero became the creative consultant for GMA Network's Alyas Robin Hood, which tells the story about Jose Paulo "Pepe" de Jesus who is a lawyer being accused of killing her father and then he faked his death to become the vigilante with a bow and arrow. Many netizens pointed out that Alyas Robin Hood has some similarities with Arrow by The CW. Stephen Amell who portrays the title character Oliver Queen/Green Arrow in Arrow also commented about Alyas Robin Hood through a Facebook post. Doctolero defended the show and she said that Alyas Robin Hood is based on the legend of Robin Hood, an English folklore, and not based on Arrow. She also further explained that the story of Robin Hood is already under public domain and it has been used as master plot by many writers. She also mentioned that there was a similar case in 2007 when she wrote the television adaptation of Lupin. Writers of the earlier adaptations of Lupin in Japan sent a demand letter to GMA Network but the writers did not win because Lupin is based on a French character created by Maurice Leblanc, which is already in public domain.

Doctolero was also the creative consultant of Destined to be Yours in 2017, headlined by Alden Richards and Maine Mendoza (collectively known as AlDub), which was their first prime time series. In April 2017, Doctolero commented on Twitter about the series saying that the first weeks of Destined to be Yours were flop or did not rate well but it later had good ratings after changing the direction of the story. AlDub fans and other netizens had mixed reactions on her social media posts. This prompted GMA Network's Senior Vice President for Entertainment TV Lilybeth G. Rasonable to release an official statement regarding the show. According to Rasonable, Destined to be Yours received higher ratings against the competition since the pilot episode until the posting of her official statement and Doctolero tweets are her own personal opinions and do not reflect the stand of GMA Network.

== Filmography ==
=== Television ===
- 1996: Tierra Sangre (as writer)
- 1999: Rio del Mar (as writer)
- 2000: May Bukas Pa (as writer)
- 2000: Te Amo, Maging Sino Ka Man (as writer)
- 2004: Forever in My Heart (as writer)
- 2005: Encantadia (as creator, head writer)
- 2005: Etheria (as creator, head writer)
- 2005: Sugo (as creative director)
- 2006: Encantadia: Pag-ibig Hanggang Wakas (as creator, head writer)
- 2006: Majika (as writer)
- 2006: Bakekang (as writer)
- 2006: Daisy Siete (as head writer)
- 2007: Lupin (as head writer)
- 2007: Impostora (as writer)
- 2007: Pasan Ko ang Daigdig (as writer)
- 2007: La Vendetta (as writer)
- 2007: Kamandag (as writer)
- 2008: Joaquin Bordado (as head writer)
- 2008: Gagambino (as head writer)
- 2008: Codename: Asero (as writer)
- 2009: Totoy Bato (as head writer)
- 2009: Ikaw Sana (as head writer)
- 2009: Stairway to Heaven (as writer)
- 2010: Panday Kids (as developer)
- 2011: My Lover, My Wife (as head writer)
- 2011: Amaya (as creator, head writer)
- 2012: Legacy (as creative director)
- 2012: Hiram na Puso (as creator, head writer)
- 2012: One True Love (as creator, head writer)
- 2012: Sana ay Ikaw na Nga (as co-brainstormer)
- 2012: Pahiram ng Sandali (as creator, creative consultant)
- 2013: Indio (as creator, head writer)
- 2013: Mundo Mo'y Akin (as creative consultant)
- 2013: My Husband's Lover (as creator, head writer)
- 2013: Akin Pa Rin ang Bukas (as creative consultant)
- 2013: Kahit Nasaan Ka Man (as creator, head writer)
- 2014: Carmela (as creator, head writer)
- 2014: Ang Dalawang Mrs. Real (as creative consultant)
- 2015: The Rich Man's Daughter (as creator, head writer)
- 2015: Healing Hearts (as creative head)
- 2015: My Faithful Husband (as head writer)
- 2016: Poor Señorita (as creative head)
- 2016: Encantadia (remake) (as head writer)
- 2016: Alyas Robin Hood (as creative consultant)
- 2017: Destined to be Yours (as creative consultant)
- 2017: Kambal, Karibal (as creative consultant)
- 2018: Hindi Ko Kayang Iwan Ka (as head writer)
- 2018: Ika-5 Utos (as creator)
- 2018: Cain at Abel (as creator)
- 2019: Bihag (as creator)
- 2019: Sahaya (as head writer)
- 2021: Legal Wives (as head writer, creator)
- 2022: Maria Clara at Ibarra (as head writer)
- 2023: Voltes V: Legacy (as head writer)
- 2024: My Guardian Alien (as creator)
- 2024: Pulang Araw (as creator, head writer)
- 2025: Encantadia Chronicles: Sang'gre (as head writer)

=== Film ===
- 1999: Hubad Sa Ilalim ng Buwan (story)
- 2005: Let the Love Begin (screenplay)
- 2005: Lovestruck (screenplay)
- 2006: I Will Always Love You (story and screenplay)
- 2007: Bahay Kubo (as screenplay)
- 2008: My Bestfriend's Girlfriend (screenplay)
- 2023: When I Met You in Tokyo (screenplay)
- 2023: Voltes V: Legacy – The Cinematic Experience (story and screenplay)
