= Etheria: Ang Ikalimang Kaharian ng Encantadia =

Philippine television drama series

- Title card
- Also known as: Etheria: The Fifth Kingdom of Encantadia
- Genre: Fantasy drama
- Created by: Suzette Doctolero
- Written by: Suzette Doctolero; Joseph Balboa; Anna Aleta Nadela
- Directed by: Mark A. Reyes V; Gil Tejada Jr.
- Starring: Sunshine Dizon; Iza Calzado; Karylle; Diana Zubiri; Dingdong Dantes
- Theme music composer: Allan Feliciano; Tata Betita
- Opening theme: "Hade" by Bayang Barrios
- Country of origin: Philippines
- Original language: Tagalog
- No. of episodes: 50

Production
- Executive producers: Winnie Hollis Reyes; Mona C. Mayuga
- Camera setup: Multiple-camera setup
- Running time: 24–35 minutes
- Production company: GMA Entertainment TV

Original release
- Network: GMA Network
- Release: December 12, 2005 – February 17, 2006

Related
- Encantadia (2005); Encantadia: Pag-ibig Hanggang Wakas; Encantadia (2016); Encantadia Chronicles: Sang'gre

Etheria: Ang Ikalimang Kaharian ng Encantadia (trans. / international title: Etheria: The Fifth Kingdom of Encantadia) is a Philippine television drama fantasy series broadcast by GMA Network. The series is the second installment of the Encantadia franchise. Directed by Mark A. Reyes V and Gil Tejada Jr., it stars Sunshine Dizon, Iza Calzado, Karylle, Diana Zubiri and Dingdong Dantes. It premiered on December 12, 2005 on the network's Telebabad line up. The series concluded on February 17, 2006, with a total of 50 episodes.

The series is streaming online on YouTube. A sequel, Encantadia: Pag-ibig Hanggang Wakas aired in 2006.

== Premise ==
After peace was restored in Encantadia, the past sneaks up on the sisters. With the lives of their loved ones at stake, they must go back in time to stop a tribe in their plan to destroy the present. In their journey, questions would be answered and the sisters must destroy the past to save the present.

== Cast and characters ==
Cast

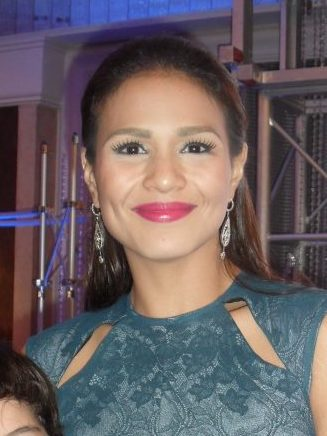
Iza Calzado

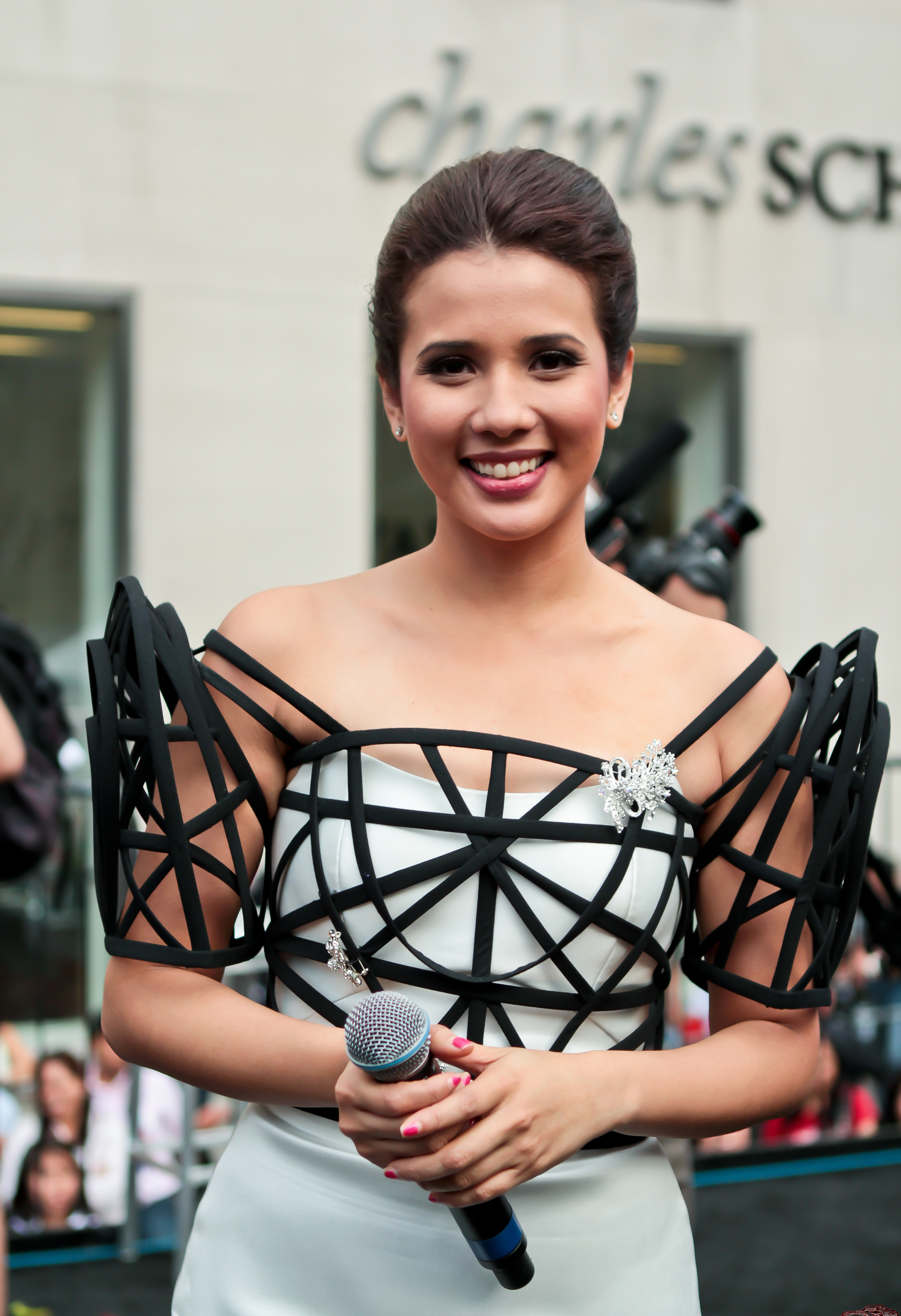
Karylle

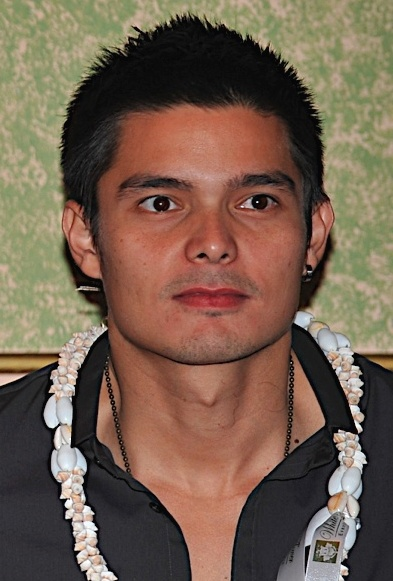
Dingdong Dantes

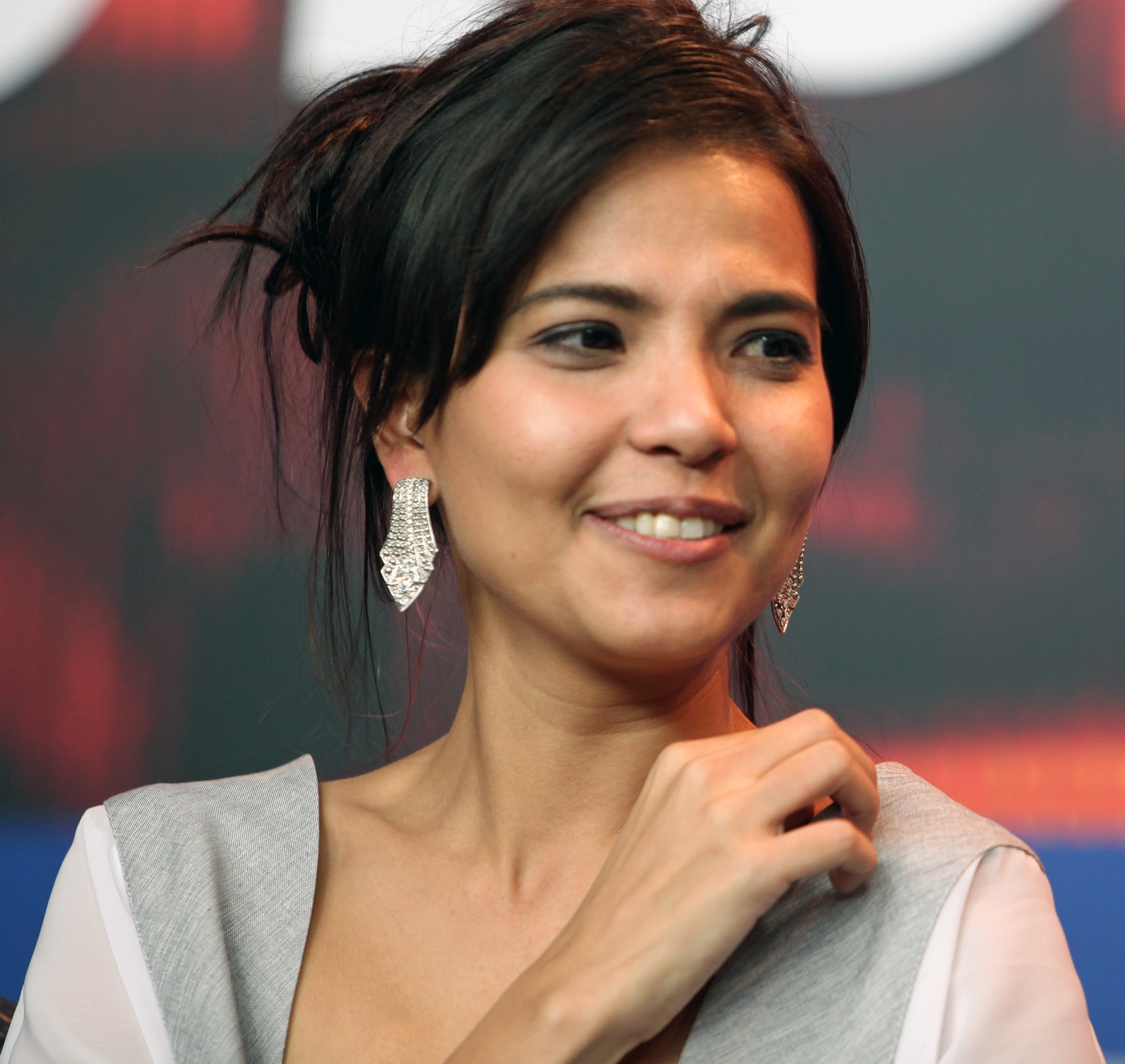
Alessandra De Rossi

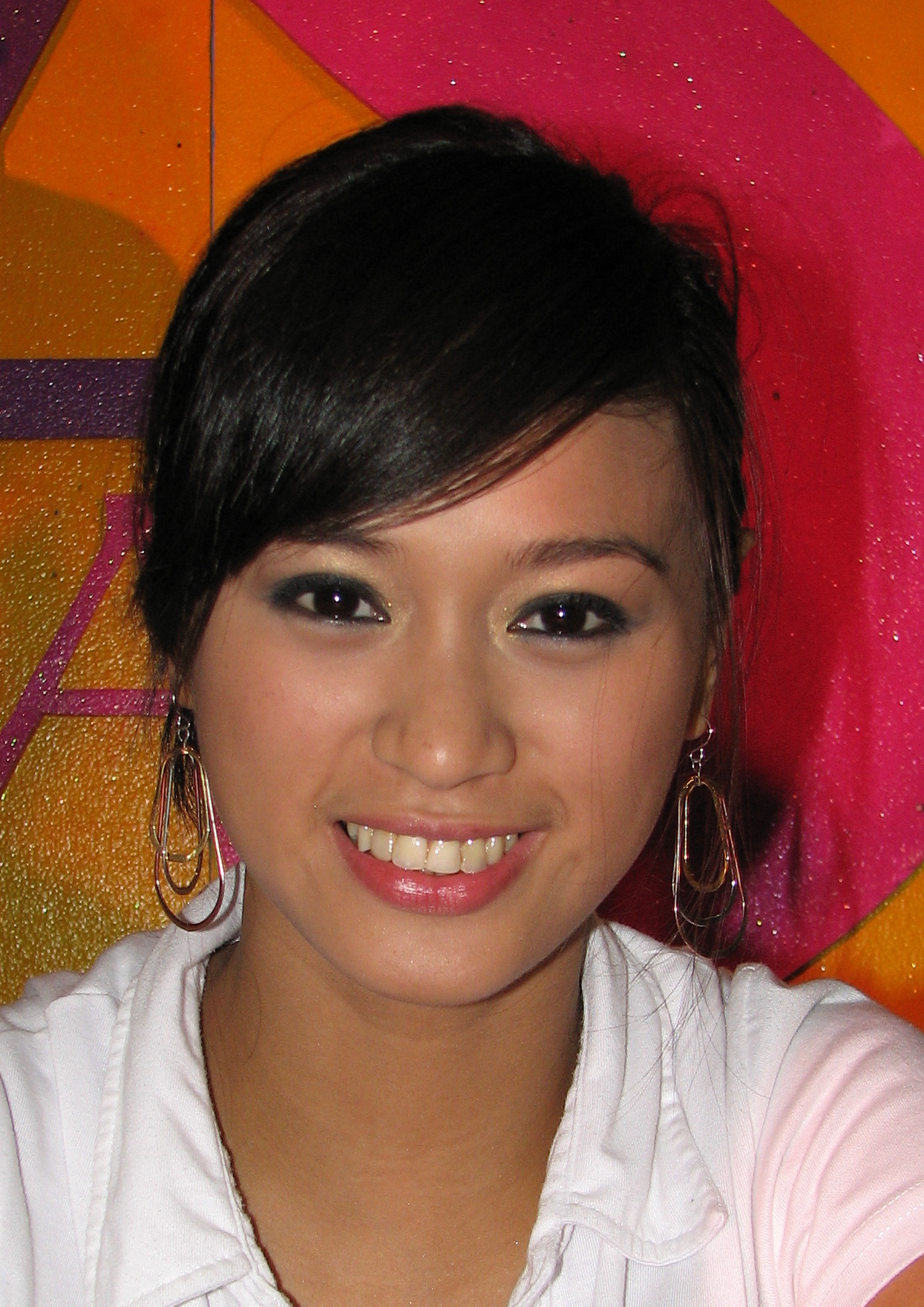
Jopay Paguia

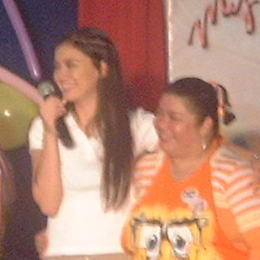
Nadine Samonte (left)

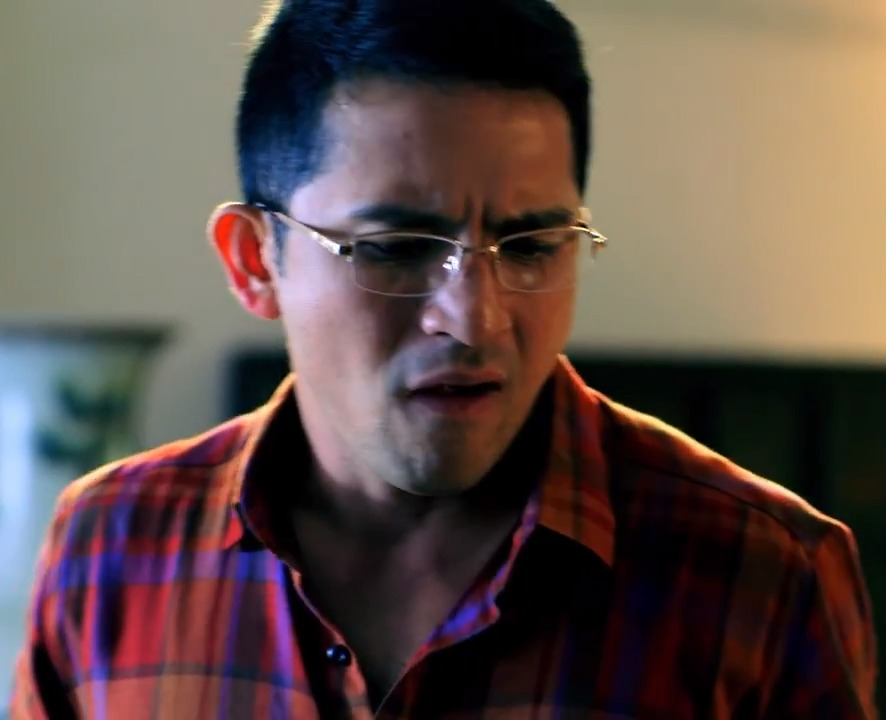
Dennis Trillo

Lead cast

- Sunshine Dizon as Pirena
- Iza Calzado as Amihan
- Karylle as Alena
- Diana Zubiri as Danaya
- Dingdong Dantes as Ybrahim / Ybarro / Alexus

Supporting cast

- Alessandra De Rossi as Andora
- Francine Prieto as Avria
- Jopay as Juvila
- Nadine Samonte as younger Mine-a
- Pauleen Luna as Odessa
- Dennis Trillo as younger Raquim
- Benjie Paras as Wahid
- Alfred Vargas as Amarro / Aquil
- Cindy Kurleto as Cassiopeia
- Margaret Wilson as Aera
- Ryan Eigenmann as Marvus
- Sid Lucero as younger Asval
- Aiza Marquez as younger Gurna
- Justin Cuyugan as Arkrey
- Paolo Paraiso as Animus
- Michael Roy Jornales as Apek
- Rainier Castillo as Nakba
- Mike "Pekto" Nacua as Banak
- Empress Schuck as younger Cassiopea
- Ella Guevara as Cassandra
- BJ Forbes as younger Aquil
- Arthur Solinap as Muros
- Ping Medina as younger Hagorn
- Tirso Cruz III as Barkus
- Tonton Gutierrez as Memen
- Raymond Bagatsing as Emre
- Gary Estrada as Meno
- Glydel Mercado as Ornia
- Angel Aquino as Ether
- Daniel Fernando as Cilatus
- Chinggoy Alonzo as Evades
- Nonie Buencamino as Bartimus
- Rachel Lobangco as As'nan
- Michael Flores as Arvark
- Maricel Morales as Ora
- Simon Ibarra as Arde
- Jason Zamora as angel of light
- Rich Vergara as angel of dark
- Noel Urbano as the voice of Imaw / Aegen
- Andrei Felix as Enuo
- Frank Garcia as Xenos
- KC Montero as Eldrin
- Neil Ryan Sese as Viktu
