= Daranak Falls =

Waterfalls in Tanay, Rizal

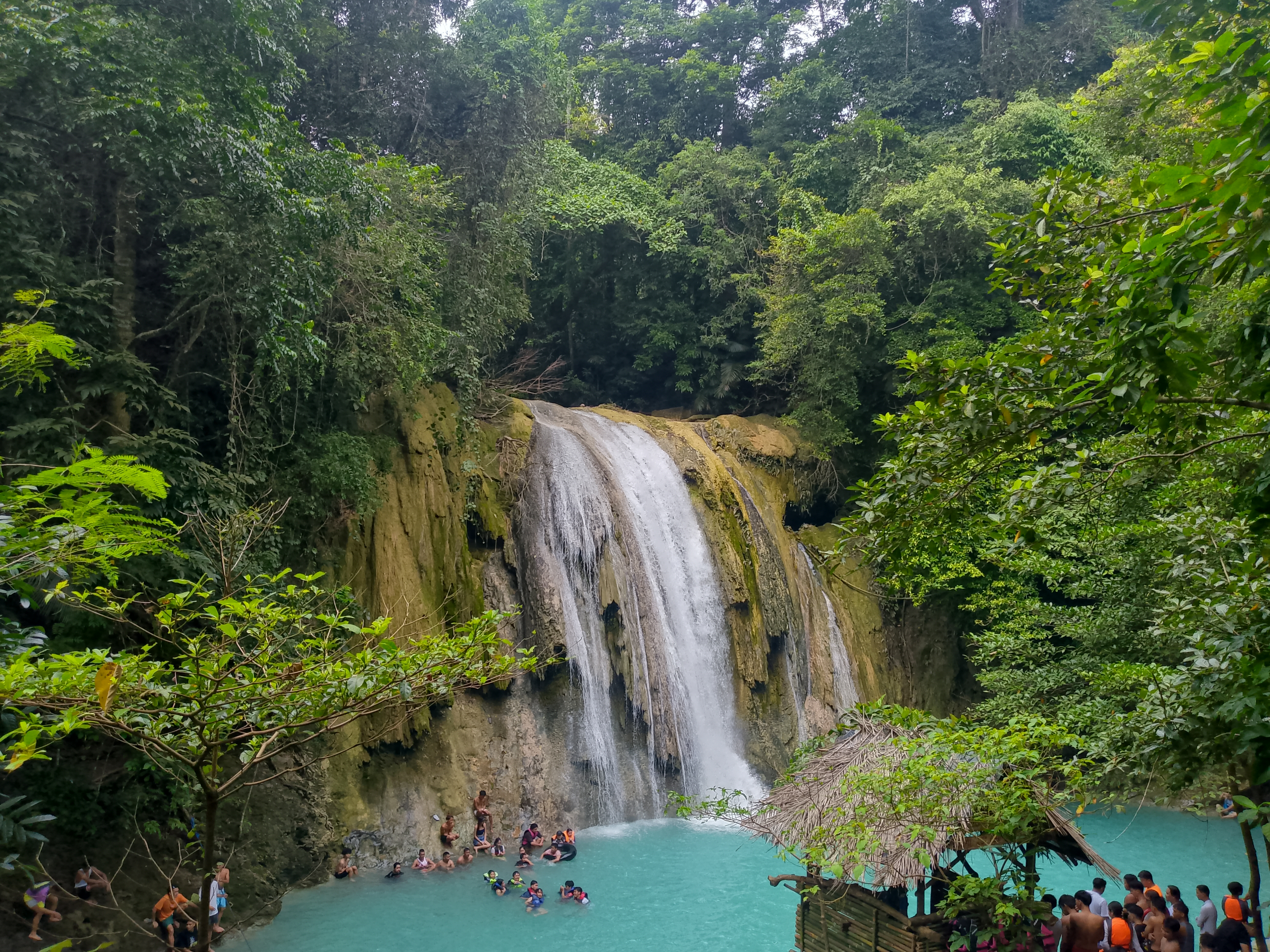
- Daranak Falls in 2024

- Location within Philippines
- Location: Brgy. Sampaloc, Tanay, Rizal, Philippines
- Coordinates: 14°54′N 121°31′E
- Type: Plunge
- Total height: 14 m (46 ft)

Daranak Falls is a waterfall located in the municipality of Tanay. It is one of the most popular tourist attractions in the province of Rizal, Philippines.

== Etymology ==
Daranak Falls came from the Tagalog word "Dadanak"which means "to flow", shortened form of "Dumaranak". The latter word was used to describe the flowing water of the falls. Another origin says that it may also came from the word phrase "Dadanak ang dugo" its directly translated "the spilling of blood".

== See also ==
- Tanay, Rizal
- Hinulugang Taktak
