= CJ Ramos =

Filipino actor

- Born: Cromell John Ocampo Ramos; March 30, 1987 (age 39)
- Occupation: Actor
- Years active: 1991–present

CJ Ramos (born March 30, 1987) is a Filipino actor. He first rose to prominence as a child actor in the 1990s where he notably appeared in a number of movies which include Ang TV Movie: The Adarna Adventure and Biyudo Si Daddy Biyuda Si Mommy.

== Personal life ==
Ramos is the younger half-brother of former GMA Network actor and dancer Sherwin Ordoñez. On July 31, 2018, Ramos was arrested in a drug buy-bust operation in Quezon City. Shortly after he was released, he was given a chance in his acting comeback via FPJ's Ang Probinsyano.

== Filmography ==
=== Television ===
Year	Title	Role	Notes	Source
1992	Ang TV	Himself		
1994	Maalaala Mo Kaya		Episode: "Cassette Tape"	
1994	Maalaala Mo Kaya	Louie	Episode: "Pakpak ng Angelito"	
1995	Maalaala Mo Kaya		Episode: "Durian"	
1995	Maalaala Mo Kaya		Episode: "Nitso"	
1996–1997	Okay Ka, Fairy Ko!	Benok Kabisote		
1997	Wansapanataym	Jake	Episode: "Twinkle"	
1997	Wansapanataym		Episode: "Imaginary Friend"	
1997	Esperanza	Carlo		
1997	Maalaala Mo Kaya		Episode: "Salbabida"	
1997	Maalaala Mo Kaya		Episode: "Paper Doll"	
1998	Maalaala Mo Kaya		Episode: "Pampang"	
1998	Maalaala Mo Kaya		Episode: "Munggo"	
1998	Maalaala Mo Kaya		Episode: "Family Tree"	
1999	Maalaala Mo Kaya		Episode: "Sinehan"	
1999	Sa Sandaling Kailangan Mo Ako	Angelito		
1999–2002	Ang Munting Paraiso	Diego Dionisio		
2000	Maalaala Mo Kaya		Episode: "Kalesa"	
2001	Maalaala Mo Kaya		Episode: "Baras"	
2002	Maalaala Mo Kaya		Episode: "Volleyball"	
2002	Maalaala Mo Kaya		Episode: "Regalo"	
2003	Maalaala Mo Kaya		Episode: "Cassette Tape"	
2004	Maalaala Mo Kaya		Episode: "Barya"	
2005	Maalaala Mo Kaya		Episode: "Family Album"	
2005	Encantadia	Bono		
2008	Maalaala Mo Kaya	Ruben's Colleague	Episode: "Botelya"	
2009	The Singing Bee	Himself / Guest		
2010	Maalaala Mo Kaya	Belinda's Son	Episode: "School Building"	
2011	Maalaala Mo Kaya	Jordan	Episode: "Ice Cream"	
2011	Maalaala Mo Kaya	Darwin's Friend	Episode: "Traysikel"	
2017	Tadhana	Edward	Episode: "Chef Tisoy"	
2018–2022	FPJ's Ang Probinsyano	Pat. Patrick Espinosa		
2023–2025	Family Feud	Himself / Player		

=== Film ===
Year	Title	Role	Notes	Source
1993	Because I Loved You	Dolzura's Kid		
1993	Tumbasan mo ng Buhay	Jimbo		
1994	Maestro Toribio: Sentensyador	Maestro's Grandchild		
1994	Abrakadabra	Arnold		
1994	Paano na Sa mundo ni Janet?	Botchoy		
1995	Araw-araw, Gabi-gabi			
1995	Costales	Junjun Costales		
1995	Rollerboys	Sputnik		
1995	Hanggang sa Huling Bala	Butchoy		
1995	Pulis Patola 2	Botbot		
1996	Itataya ka ang Buhay Ko	Junjun		
1996	Ang TV Movie: The Adarna Adventure	Budoy		
1996	Maginoong Barumbado	Mark		
1997	I Do, I Die, Dyos Ko Day!	CJ		
1997	Biyudo si Daddy, Biyuda si Mommy	CJ		
1997	Askal	young Askal		
1997	Wanted: Perfect Murder	Popoy		
1999	Tik Tak Tok: My Kolokotoys	Robin		
1999	Wansapanataym	Caloy		
2000	Tanging Yaman	John-John		
2004	Kilig... Pintig... Yanig...			
2005	Awaken	Brian		
2010	Rekrut	Ghani Ahmad		
2011	Cuchera	Lobo		
2012	Shackled	Kamlon		
2012	Palitan	Butchoy		
2013	Rematado	Hubert		

== Awards and nominations ==
Year	Award	Category	Work	Result	Source
1994	FAMAS Awards	FAMAS Award for Best Child Performer	Tumbasan mo ng Buhay	Nominated	
1996	FAMAS Awards	FAMAS Award for Best Child Actor	Araw-araw, Gabi-gabi	Nominated	
2000	Young Critics Circle Award	Best Performance by Male or Female, Adult or Child, Individual or Ensemble in Leading or Supporting Role	Tanging Yaman	Won	
2001	FAMAS Awards	FAMAS Award for Best Child Actor	Tanging Yaman	Nominated	
