= Michael Roy Jornales =

Filipino actor

- Born: Michael Roy Rigets Jornales; March 16, 1984 (age 42); Quezon City, Metro Manila, Philippines
- Occupation: Actor
- Years active: 1992–present
- Height: 5 ft 7 in (170 cm)
- Children: Heath Jornales

Michael Roy Jornales is a Filipino actor.

== Career ==
=== Acting ===
Jornales started out as a child actor and was one of the original child cast of Ang TV.

Jornales played P/Cpt. Francisco "Chikoy" Rivera in FPJ's Ang Probinsyano from 2015 to 2019.

In 2021, Jornales appeared as Danilo Garcia in First Yaya where he is also the stunt and routine director.

=== Music ===
Jornales formed the band SAGIPBATA in 1996 where he was vocalist and lead guitarist. He is also the lead vocalist of the band Brainwash.

== Personal life ==
Jornales has three children with partner Jem including child actor Heath Jornales and Star Hunt: The Grand Audition Show aspirant Heather Jornales.

== Filmography ==
=== Television ===
| Year | Title | Role | Notes | Source |
|---|---|---|---|---|
| 1992 | Ang TV | Himself / various roles | | |
| 1996 | Maalaala Mo Kaya | | Episode: "Dugo" | |
| 1997 | Wansapanataym | | Episode: "Twinkle" | |
| 1997 | Wansapanataym | | Episode: "Melchora Meets Cedie" | |
| 2005 | Encantadia | Apek | | |
| 2005–2006 | Etheria: Ang Ikalimang Kaharian ng Encantadia | Apek | | |
| 2006 | Encantadia: Pag-ibig Hanggang Wakas | Apek | | |
| 2007 | Pinoy Mano Mano: Celebrity Boxing Challenge | Himself – grand winner | | |
| 2011 | Minsan Lang Kita Iibigin | Butch | | |
| 2012 | Maalaala Mo Kaya | Lito | Episode: "Kamao" | |
| 2015–2019 | FPJ's Ang Probinsyano | P/Cpt. Francisco "Chikoy" Rivera | | |
| 2019-2020 | Beautiful Justice | Dudut | | |
| 2020 | Maalaala Mo Kaya | Coach | Episode: "Medal" | |
| 2020 | Almost Paradise | Big Bones | Episode: "Reef Eel Soup for the Soul" | |
| 2021 | Maalaala Mo Kaya | Dennis | Episode: "Sobre" | |
| 2021 | First Yaya | Danilo Garcia | | |
| 2023 | Mga Lihim ni Urduja | Villaroman | | |
| 2023 | Walang Matigas na Pulis sa Matinik na Misis | Mata | | |
| 2024 | Pulang Araw | Jorge | | |
| 2024 | Black Rider | Chito | | |
| 2025 | Lolong | Leo | | |
| 2025 | Sanggang Dikit FR | Markus | | |
| 2026 | The Master Cutter | Mongki | | |

=== Film ===
| Year | Title | Role | Notes | Source |
|---|---|---|---|---|
| 1996 | Ang TV Movie: The Adarna Adventure | Chop Chop | | |
| 1997 | Ang Pulubi at ang Prinsesa | Rico | | |
| 1997 | Mariano Mison... NBI | | | |
| 1999 | Wansapanataym: The Movie | Butchok's friend | | |
| 2001 | Tabi-tabi Po! | Male Vampire II | Segment: "Vampira 2000" | |
