= Skye Chua =

Filipina figure skater and actress (born 2003)

- Born: Charmaine Skye Chua; June 18, 2003 (age 23); San Juan, Metro Manila, Philippines
- Occupations: Actress, figure skater
- Years active: 2023–present (acting)
- Agent: Sparkle GMA Artist Center
- Figure skating career
- Height: 175 cm (5 ft 9 in)
- Country: Philippines
- Coach: Abraham Domdom; Chrisha Gossard
- Began skating: 2010

Charmaine Skye Chua (born June 18, 2003) is a Filipina figure skater and actress.

== Early life and education ==
Charmaine Skye Chua was born in San Juan, Metro Manila on June 18, 2003, to Smith and Cherrie Chua. She took up figure skating at age seven at the SM Mall of Asia skating rink in Pasay. She continued to skate while attending St. Jude Catholic School. In college, Chua entered the University of the Philippines Diliman (UPD) pursuing a degree in sports science while managing her careers in figure skating and acting.

== Career ==
=== Figure skating ===
Chua joined her first competition at age 10. She joined International Skating Institute (ISI) sanctioned tournaments, with her first being Skate Manila where she took several gold medals.

She debuted at the Philippine Figure Skating Championships in 2017 and won a gold in the advanced novice category.

Chua took part at the 2025 Winter World University Games in Turin, Italy. She finished with 26.69 points in the short program placing 32nd place. She failed to advance to the free program.

She skated at the 2025 Asian Open Figure Skating Trophy.

=== Acting ===
Shortly after enrolling in college, Chua also became an actress and became affiliated with the GMA Network through the Sparkle GMA Artist Center. She debuted in Hearts on Ice, a 2023 television series about figure skating and played the role of Sonja Limjoco. She also appeared in Black Rider and Pulang Araw.

== Personal life ==
Chua was a muse for NorthPort Batang Pier at the 2024–25 season of the Philippine Basketball Association.

== Programs ==
Season	Short program	Free skating
2025–2026	Conga x Rhythm Is Gonna Get You by Gloria Estefan & Lawrence Dermer	Tomorrow Never Dies by Sheryl Crow; James Bond Theme by the Imperial Orchestra; No Time to Die by Billie Eilish

== Competitive highlights ==
- CS – Event of the ISU Challenger Series
- TBD – Assigned
- WD – Withdrew from competition

Competition placements at senior level
Season	2024–25	2025–26
World University Games	32nd	
Philippine Championships	5th	
SEA Open Trophy	3rd	

== Filmography ==
=== Television ===
Year	Title	Role	Ref.
2023	Hearts on Ice	Sonja Limjoco	
2023-2025	Family Feud	Herself/Guest Player	
2023-2026	TiktoClock	Herself/Guest	
2024	Black Rider	Valencia Chen	
2024	Pulang Araw	Yuki	
2025-2026	Encantadia Chronicles: Sang'gre	Rikit	
2025-2026	Hating Kapatid	Addison	
