= Cindy Kurleto =

Model, actress, and a former MTV VJ in the Philippines

- Born: Cynthia Kristina Kurleto; April 21, 1979 (age 47); Vienna, Austria
- Years active: 2003–2007; 2019–2020
- Agents: Star Magic (2003-2004) GMA Artist Center (2004-2007); APT Entertainment
- Spouse: Daniel Joseph Navalia
- Children: 2
- Modeling information
- Height: 5 ft 7 in (1.70 m)
- Hair color: Brown
- Eye color: Brown

Cynthia Kristina Kurleto (born April 21, 1979) is an Austrian former model, actress, and an MTV VJ in the Philippines. She is known for being a commercial model and an FHM model in the Philippines and also for playing the role of Cassiopea in the hit series Encantadia and its prequel/sequel Etheria: Ang Ikalimang Kaharian ng Encantadia. She was born to an Austrian father and Filipino mother.

== Biography ==
The daughter of Faustina Verdillo and Friedrich Kurleto, following her parents' divorce, she was raised by her mother in Austria where she grew up. Cindy finished her education from elementary to college and took a Hotel and Restaurant Management course. She later became a waitress. In 2001, she left her job and decided to take a vacation in her other home country, the Philippines. She sold her car and apartment, quit her job, bought a ticket, packed one suitcase and left for the Philippines. Long after arriving, she decided to settle in Legazpi City, Albay for good. It was during her hosting stint at a local ABS-CBN show in Legazpi that she was spotted by a talent scout and offered to do modelling jobs in Manila.

She shot into stardom as one of the Palmolive girls. Her first crack at showbiz was when she became a co-host to ABS-CBN's Masayang Tanghali Bayan for more than a year. When it went off the air, she was taken in as MTV video jockey.

Her first movie was Jerry Lopez Sineneng's Ngayong Nandito Ka (2003) with Kristine Hermosa, Jericho Rosales and Onemig Bondoc.

Kurleto was declared FHM's "Sexiest Woman of the World" in 2004 after she appeared on the cover of FHM Philippines in April 2004.

She became a co-host in the longest noontime variety show Eat Bulaga! and mainstay in Sundays' comedy show Daddy Di Do Du. She left Eat Bulaga! in November 2007. Her co-hosts at Eat Bulaga! supported her decision.

She returned to Eat Bulaga! on March 9, 2019, as a guest player in Boom!.

=== Personal life ===
Kurleto is now married to Barbadian British businessman, Daniel Joseph Navalia.

== Filmography ==
=== Film ===
Year	Title	Role
2003	Ngayong Nandito Ka	Angela
2005	Ispiritista: Itay, May Moomoo	Lalaine

=== Television ===
Year	Title	Role
2003–2004	Masayang Tanghali Bayan	Co-host
2004–2006	ASAP	Co-host / Herself / Performer
2004	Daddy Di Do Du	Greta
2004	Forever In My Heart	Elaine
2005	Encantadia	Cassiopea
2005	Etheria: Ang Ikalimang Kaharian ng Encantadia	Cassiopea
2005–2007	Eat Bulaga!	Co-host
2006	Encantadia: Pag-ibig Hanggang Wakas	Cassiopea
2019	Eat Bulaga!	Guest Player in Boom! (Comeback)
2020	Make It with You	Raquel Villarica

== Awards ==
- Ranked # 3 - FHM Philippines' 100 Sexiest Women in the World 2003
- Ranked # 2 (# 1 Philippines' Finest) - FHM Philippines' 100 Sexiest Women in the World 2004
- Ranked # 5 - FHM Philippines' 100 Sexiest Women in the World 2005
- Ranked # 7 - FHM Philippines' 100 Sexiest Women in the World 2006
