= List of Encantadia (2016 TV series) episodes =

Encantadia is a Philippine television drama fantasy series, the series was a reboot (often called as requel or retelling-sequel) in 2005 fantasy series with the same name. The series premiered on GMA Network's GMA Telebabad evening block and also aired worldwide through GMA Pinoy TV on July 18, 2016, replacing Poor Señorita. and has catch-up episodes via iflix.

The cast including those who portrayed the sang'gres or keepers of the four gems were revealed on April 4, 2016. Kylie Padilla played the role of Amihan, Alena by Gabbi Garcia, Danaya by Sanya Lopez and Pirena by Glaiza de Castro.

Urban Luzon and NUTAM (Nationwide Urban Television Audience Measurement) ratings are provided by AGB Nielsen Philippines while Kantar Media Philippines provide Nationwide ratings (Urban + Rural).

The series ended its 44-week run on May 19, 2017, with a total of 218 episodes. It was replaced by Mulawin vs. Ravena. It reprised another season entitled Encantadia Chronicles: Sang'gre with different ambience and aired on June 16, 2025.

== Series overview ==
Season	Episodes	Originally released	
Season	Episodes	First released	Last released
1	218	July 18, 2016	May 19, 2017

== Episodes ==
The episode titles are taken from the official hashtag of the day, for one episode may have multiple chapters or a continuation of a particular chapter.

The 45th episode marked the end of the retelling of the original story in 2005 wherein Queen Amihan was dethroned by Pirena who headed a coup de etat against the Lireo Kingdom. The 46th episode embarked the beginning of the sequel in which new story line debut.

=== Season 1 (2016–17) ===
==== July 2016 ====
Episode		Chapter(s)	Original air date	Social media hashtag	Enchan of the day	AGB Nielsen Urban Luzon		Kantar Media Nationwide		Prod. Code	Ref.
Episode		Chapter(s)	Original air date	Social media hashtag	Enchan of the day	Rating	Rank	Rating	Rank	Prod. Code	Ref.
1	"Pilot"	(1) The Two Most Powerful Diwatas (2) The Greediness of the Fourth Kingdom (3) Cassiopea's Anger (4) The War of Sapiro and Hathoria	July 18, 2016	#Encantadia	—N/a	26.1%	#1	21.0%	#4	101 - A	
2	"Propesiya" (Prophecy)	(5) The Curse on Adhara (6)The New Sang'gre of Lireo	July 19, 2016	#EncantadiaPropesiya	Ei correa diu ("I Love You")	23.5%	#2	19.6%	#4	102 - B	
3	"Sumpa ni Minea" (Curse of Minea)	(7) The Threat to Sang'gre Amihan	July 20, 2016	#EncantadiaSumpaNiMinea	Ivo livé ("Mabuhay")	23.3%	#2	20.1%	#5	103 - C	
4	"Babala" (Warning)	(8) When Hathoria was Cursed	July 21, 2016	#EncantadiaBabala	Pashnea! ("Pagpapahayag ng galit")	21.6%	#3	18.9%	#5	104 - D	
5	"Mortal" (Mortal)	(8) When Hathoria was Cursed	July 22, 2016	#EncantadiaMortal	Na esuedria ade ("Mag-ingat ka")	23.5%	#2	19.8%	#5	105 - E	
6	"Pag-amin" (Confession)	(9) The Re-confrontation	July 25, 2016	#EncantadiaPagAmin	Estasectu ("Maghanda na")	23.8%	#2	19.0%	#5	106 - F	
7	"Pagtutuos" (Showdown)	(10) The Return of the Sang'gre	July 26, 2016	#EncantadiaPagtutuos	Hasne ivo livé ("Maligayang Kaarawan")	23.0%	#2	18.8%	#5	107 - G	
8	"Avisala mga Sang'gre" (Hello Sang'gres)	(11) The True Identity of Pirena	July 27, 2016	#AvisalaMgaSanggre	Es je ivtu kaesic ("Kaya natin 'to")	23.9%	#2	20.5%	#4	108 - H	
9	"Pagsubok" (Test)	(11) The True Identity of Pirena	July 28, 2016	#EncantadiaPagsubok	Agape avi ("Paumanhin Po")	24.3%	#2	19.7%	#4	110 - J	
10	"Tagisan" (Competition)	(12) The Contest of the Four Siblings	July 29, 2016	#EncantadiaTagisan	Ssheda ("Hinto/Tigil")	23.9%	#2	21.1%	#4	111 - K	
Average						23.7%		19.9%			

==== August 2016 ====
Episode		Chapter(s)	Original air date	Social media hashtag	Enchan of the day	AGB Nielsen Urban Luzon		Kantar Media Nationwide		Prod. Code	Ref.
Episode		Chapter(s)	Original air date	Social media hashtag	Enchan of the day	Rating	Rank	Rating	Rank	Prod. Code	Ref.
11	"Galit ni Pirena" (Wrath of Pirena)	(13) The Call of Power (14) The New Guardians	August 1, 2016	#EncantadiaGalitNiPirena	Ssheda musti maste ("Hindi natin sila bibigyan ng kapayapaan!")	24.9%	#3	20.6%	#8	112 - L	
12	"Paghaharap" (Confrontation)	(15) The Rebellion of Pirena (16) The War of the Sang'gres	August 2, 2016	#EncantadiaPaghaharap	Ebi meshne ("Pagsisisihan mo 'to")	24.3%	#2	20.4%	#4	109 - I	
13	"Damdamin" (Feeling)	(17) Appropriate for the Queen	August 3, 2016	#EncantadiaDamdamin	Isne bin voyanazar ("Parating na siya")	24.1%	#2	21.6%	#5	113 - M	
14	"Ang Itinakda" (The Appointed)	(18) The New Heir	August 4, 2016	#EncantadiaAngItinakda	Ne sshuda ("Mali ang sinasabi mo")	23.0%	#2	19.4%	#5	115 - O	
15	"Katotohanan" (Truth)	(19) The Bad Vision of Minea	August 5, 2016	#EncantadiaKatotohanan	Ilantre ivi e correi? ("Nasaan ang pag-ibig?")	22.5%	#2	19.2%	#4	114 - N	
16	"Avisala Lira at Mira" (Hello to Lira and Mira)	(19) The Bad Vision of Minea	August 8, 2016	#AvisalaLiraAtMira	Ivi duo ("Alam ko")	22.4%	#3	19.4%	#9	116 - P	
17	"Pagbabalik" (Return)	(20) The Traitor of Lireo	August 9, 2016	#EncantadiaPagbabalik	Geshnu ("Layuan mo ako")	24.0%	#3	20.7%	#7	117 - Q	
18	"Panganib" (Danger)	(20) The Traitor of Lireo	August 10, 2016	#EncantadiaPanganib	Ena-i ("Bilisan mo")	24.5%	#3	20.9%	#5	119 - S	
19	"Misyon" (Mission)	(21) Milagros	August 11, 2016	#EncantadiaMisyon	Avisala meiste ("Paalam")	24.8%	#2	20.3%	#5	118 - R	
20	"Kutob" (Hunch)	(22) Milagros' Destiny	August 12, 2016	#EncantadiaKutob	Edepunte-runte ("Hanapin mo siya")	26.1%	#2	21.2%	#6	121 - U	
21	"Pinagmulan" (Origin)	(22) Milagros' Destiny	August 15, 2016	#EncantadiaPinagmulan	Avira voya uste ("Hayaan mo akong makadaan")	25.5%	#3	20.7%	#6	120 - T	
22	"Lihim" (Secret)	(22) Milagros' Destiny	August 16, 2016	#EncantadiaLihim	Eteka aneya ivi? ("Nakalimutan mo na ba?")	23.8%	#3	20.3%	#6	122 - V	
23	"Pagaspas"	(22) Milagros' Destiny	August 17, 2016	#EncantadiaPagaspas	Ssheda musni verom ("Hindi ko ibibigay ang nais mo")	26.3%	#1	20.5%	#5	123 - W	
24	"Pagtutuos" (Showdown)	(22) Milagros' Destiny	August 18, 2016	#EncantadiaPagtutuos	Hasne! ("Umalis ka sa harapan ko")	23.3%	#3	20.4%	#5	126 - Z	
25	"Pagkikita" (Reunion)	(22) Milagros' Destiny	August 19, 2016	#EncantadiaPagkikita	Gushna ivdea ("Tanggapin mo ang aking basbas")	23.5%	#2	21.5%	#4	125 - Y	
26	"Kapalaran" (Destiny)	(22) Milagros' Destiny	August 22, 2016	#EncantadiaKapalaran	Inveshé ("Panaginip")	24.1%	#3	21.3%	#5	124 - X	
27	"Tadhana" (Fate)	(22) Milagros' Destiny	August 23, 2016	#EncantadiaTadhana	Luntaie ("Tagapagligtas")	25.5%	#1	22.3%	#4	201 - AA	
28	"Hinala" (Suspicion)	(22) Milagros' Destiny	August 24, 2016	#EncantadiaHinala	Amarteya ("Kalayaan")	25.2%	#1	22.7%	#5	203 - CC	
29	"Maghihintay" (Waiting)	(22) Milagros' Destiny	August 25, 2016	#EncantadiaMaghihintay	Avoya ("Paglalakbay")	25.5%	#1	23.0%	#4	202 - BB	
30	"Avisala Vish'ka" (Enter Vish'ka)	(22) Milagros' Destiny	August 26, 2016	#AvisalaVishka	Paneya ("Tinapay")	26.1%	#1	21.7%	#4	204 - DD	
31	"Panlilinlang" (Dishonesty)	(22) Milagros' Destiny	August 29, 2016	#EncantadiaPanlilinlang	Adoyaneva ("Hinaharap")	23.1%	#3	21.0%	#5	205 - EE	
32	"Pagsugod" (Dash)	(22) Milagros' Destiny	August 30, 2016	#EncantadiaPagsugod	Corra ("Puso")	24.6%	—N/a	22.1%	#4	208 - HH	
33	"Galit" (Wrath)	(22) Milagros' Destiny	August 31, 2016	#EncantadiaGalit	Menantre ("Guro")	23.6%	#3	21.3%	#5	206 - FF	
Average						24.4%		21.0%			

==== September 2016 ====
Episode		Chapter(s)	Original air date	Social media hashtag	Enchan of the day	AGB Nielsen Urban Luzon		Kantar Media Nationwide		Prod. Code	Ref.
Episode		Chapter(s)	Original air date	Social media hashtag	Enchan of the day	Rating	Rank	Rating	Rank	Prod. Code	Ref.
34	"Kalaban" (Adversary)	(22) Milagros' Destiny	September 1, 2016	#EncantadiaKalaban	Neshda ("Bulong")	23.7%	#2	20.2%	#5	207 - GG	
35	"Pagsasaliksik" (Search)	(22) Milagros' Destiny	September 2, 2016	#EncantadiaPagsasaliksik	Sancretireya ("Pamamaalam")	23.9%	#1	20.8%	#6	209 - II	
36	"Paratang" (Accusation)	(22) Milagros' Destiny	September 5, 2016	#EncantadiaParatang	Adarde ("Lumapit ka sa akin")	25.8%	#1	20.9%	#5	210 - JJ	
37	"Hatol" (Judgment)	(22) Milagros' Destiny	September 6, 2016	#EncantadiaHatol	Esna musna gebata ("Mayroon ka ring kapangyarihan")	24.3%	#2	20.6%	#5	211 - KK	
38	"Laban" (Fighting)	(22) Milagros' Destiny	September 7, 2016	#EncantadiaLaban	Gusna dune sang'gre ("Paalala sa mga Sang'gre")	24.0%	#2	21.4%	#5	212 - MM	
39	"Banta" (Threat)	(22) Milagros' Destiny	September 8, 2016	#EncantadiaBanta	Hasne duvin? ("Ano'ng nangyari sa'yo?")	24.3%	#2	19.7%	#8	211 - LL	
40	"Pangungulila" (Mourning)	(22) Milagros' Destiny	September 9, 2016	#EncantadiaPangungulila	Geshnu ivré ("Iwan mo akong mag-isa")	23.7%	#1	21.1%	#5	217 - QQ	
41	"Panaginip" (Dream)	(22) Milagros' Destiny	September 12, 2016	#EncantadiaPanaginip	Geshnu invé! ("Iwan mo kami!")	23.4%	#3	22.5%	#4	214 - NN	
42	"Sabwatan" (Conspiracy)	(22) Milagros' Destiny	September 13, 2016	#EncantadiaSabwatan	Acrimeya ("Kaligtasan")	23.8%	#3	23.3%	#5	216 - PP	
43	"Hudyat" (Signal)	(22) Milagros' Destiny	September 14, 2016	#EncantadiaHudyat	Lireo ("Tahanan")	25.5%	#2	22.8%	#5	215 - OO	
44	"Himagsikan" (Rebellion)	(22) Milagros' Destiny	September 15, 2016	#EncantadiaHimagsikan	Adnes nesa aduwa iva? ("Ano'ng ibig sabihin nito?")	26.6%	#1	24.8%	#4	218 - RR	
45	"Para Sa Lireo" (For Lireo)	(22) Milagros' Destiny	September 16, 2016	#ParaSaLireo	Ivi kuntirunte ("Inuutusan kita")	27.0%	#1	23.6%	#4	219 - SS	
46	"Ika-limang Brilyante" (The Fifth Gem)	(23) The Land of Lireo Under the Control of the Hathor	September 17, 2016	#IkalimangBrilyante	Edi sanctre ("Kamatayan")	25.7%	#2	22.2%	#6	221 - UU	
47	"Pagbabanta" (Threaten)	(24) The People of Encantadia at the World of Mortals	September 20, 2016	#EncantadiaPagbabanta	Ivi eshvia ("Pagbabayaran mo 'to")	26.6%	#1	25.4%	#4	220 - TT	
48	"Avisala Lakan" (Hello Lakan)	(24) The People of Encantadia at the World of Mortals	September 21, 2016	#AvisalaLakan	Detrumvia ("Sinungaling")	27.8%	#1	25.4%	#4	222 - VV	
49	"Paglipad" (Flight)	(24) The People of Encantadia at the World of Mortals	September 22, 2016	#EncantadiaPaglipad	Asshenti ("Makinig")	28.3%	#1	25.7%	#4	223 - WW	
50	"Kaanib" (Ally)	(24) The People of Encantadia at the World of Mortals	September 23, 2016	#EncantadiaKaanib	Neda-veda ("Wala siya rito")	27.1%	#1	24.7%		225 - YY	
51	"Kakayahan" (Ability)	(24) The People of Encantadia at the World of Mortals	September 26, 2016	#EncantadiaKakayahan	Ado ("Ama")	25.8%	#1	24.4%	#4	224 - XX	
52	"Bagong Pagsubok" (The New Test)	(24) The People of Encantadia at the World of Mortals (25) The Revolt Took Place in Carcero	September 27, 2016	#EncantadiaBagongPagsubok	Ybarro ("Matapang")	27.1%	#1	24.4%	#4	226 - ZZ	
53	"Bagsik ni Lakan" (Fury of Lakan)	(26) A Fight Between Two Diwata Prisoners	September 28, 2016	#BagsikNiLakan	Edepunte runte! ("Hanapin mo siya!")	25.9%	#2	22.5%	#5	301 - AAA	
54	"Tagapagligtas" (Savior)	(26) A Fight Between Two Diwata Prisoners	September 29, 2016	#EncantadiaTagapagligtas	Ivi este ("Hindi ko alam")	26.9%	#1	25.1%	#3	302 - BBB	
55	"Alaala" (Memory)	(27) The Welcoming Return of the Mulawin (28) The Journey of the Two Sang'gre	September 30, 2016	#EncantadiaAlaala	Ssheda lasta! ("Hindi maaaring mangyari ang sinasabi mo!")	25.6%	#1	23.0%	#4	303 - CCC	
Average						25.6%		22.9%			

==== October 2016 ====
Episode		Chapter(s)	Original air date	Social media hashtag	Enchan of the day	AGB Nielsen Urban Luzon		Kantar Media Nationwide		Prod. Code	Ref.
Episode		Chapter(s)	Original air date	Social media hashtag	Enchan of the day	Rating	Rank	Rating	Rank	Prod. Code	Ref.
56	"Tapatan" (Face off)	(28) The Journey of the Two Sang'gre (29) The Contest Between the Giant and the Diwata	October 3, 2016	#EncantadiaTapatan	Celestia ("Anghel")	26.0%	#1	24.0%	#3	305 - EEE	
57	"Pagtatagpo" (Meeting)	(29) The Contest Between the Giant and the Diwata	October 4, 2016	#EncantadiaPagtatagpo	Nedanus muste ("Nakakabighani ang iyong ganda")	26.0%	#2	24.6%	#3	304 - DDD	
58	"Paraan" (Way)	(29) The Contest Between the Giant and the Diwata (30) The Resolve of Vish'ka	October 5, 2016	#EncantadiaParaan	Masne ("Kapayapaan")	26.8%	#1	25.4%	#4	306 - FFF	
59	"Pagligtas" (Save)	(30) The Resolve of Vish'ka	October 6, 2016	#EncantadiaPagligtas	Este ivi? ("Totoo ba ito?")	29.2%	#1	23.4%	#3	311 - KKK	
60	"Katanungan" (Question)	(30) The Resolve of Vish'ka	October 7, 2016	#EncantadiaKatanungan	Ssheda dini luna! ("Kailangan mong mamatay!")	25.8%	#2	22.5%	#4	309 - III	
61	"Pakikipaglaban" (Fighting)	(30) The Resolve of Vish'ka	October 10, 2016	#EncantadiaPakikipaglaban	A-jun ("Awit")	25.6%	#2	23.6%	#4	307 - GGG	
62	"Muling Pagkikita" (Reunion)	(30) The Resolve of Vish'ka (31) New Threats for the Diwata	October 11, 2016	#EncantadiaMulingPagkikita	Yanarteya ("Nakaraan")	27.2%	#2	24.5%	#4	308 - HHH	
63	"Tapang" (Courage)	(31) New Threats for the Diwata	October 12, 2016	#EncantadiaTapang	Ganto ("Kabayo")	25.7%	#2	22.1%	#6	310 - JJJ	
64	"Harapan" (Face off)	(31) New Threats for the Diwata	October 13, 2016	#EncantadiaHarapan	Ivi sanctre ("Siya'y yumao na")	27.3%	#1	24.7%	#4	312 - LLL	
65	"Mag-ina" (Mother to daughter)	(31) New Threats for the Diwata	October 14, 2016	#EncantadiaMagIna	Ada ("Ina")	25.6%	#1	24.4%	#3	313 - MMM	
66	"Para Sa Anak" (For the child)	(31) New Threats for the Diwata	October 17, 2016	#EncantadiaParaSaAnak	Agodo ("Palaka")	27.2%	#2	24.0%	#5	316 - PPP	
67	"Mukha Ni Lilasari" (Lilasari's Face)	(31) New Threats for the Diwata	October 18, 2016	#MukhaNiLilasari	Aldo ("Tiyuhin")	27.8%	#1	24.7%	#3	314 - NNN	
68	"Hamon" (Challenge)	(31) New Threats for the Diwata	October 19, 2016	#EncantadiaHamon	Musti ("Kailangan")	26.4%	#2	23.0%	—N/a	315 - OOO	
69	"Tangka" (Intention)	(31) New Threats for the Diwata	October 20, 2016	#EncantadiaTangka	Sshedi ("Maghiganti")	29.9%	#1	23.9%	—N/a	317 - QQQ	
70	"Pagkakamali" (Mistake)	(31) New Threats for the Diwata	October 21, 2016	#EncantadiaPagkakamali	Ade ("Ikaw Nga")	28.7%	#1	24.3%	#3	318 - RRR	
71	"Basbas" (Blessing)	(31) New Threats for the Diwata	October 24, 2016	#EncantadiaBasbas	Ilo ("Lolo")	27.1%	#1	23.7%	#4	319 - SSS	
72	"Kasunduan" (Accord)	(31) New Threats for the Diwata	October 25, 2016	#EncantadiaKasunduan	Luntae ("Kalayaan")	27.5%	#1	23.9%	#4	320 - TTT	
73	"Kapanalig" (Friend)	(31) New Threats for the Diwata	October 26, 2016	#EncantadiaKapanalig	Ivi esna adelan e ("Ito ang pinangakong lupa")	27.2%	#1	23.6%	#4	321 - UUU	
74	"Plano" (Plan)	(31) New Threats for the Diwata	October 27, 2016	#EncantadiaPlano	Ivi lévi ("Masama siyang Nilalang")	27.8%	#1	25.1%	—N/a	323 - WWW	
75	"Sorpresa" (Surprise)	(31) New Threats for the Diwata	October 28, 2016	#EncantadiaSorpresa	Gushna ivdea ("Binabasbasan kita.")	26.3%	#1	23.8%	#3	322 - VVV	
76	"Paghimok" (Persuasion)	(31) New Threats for the Diwata	October 31, 2016	#EncantadiaPaghimok	Kantao ("Pulseras")	26.7%	#1	23.8%	#3	325 - YYY	
Average						27.0%		24.0%			

==== November 2016 ====
Episode		Chapter(s)	Original air date	Social media hashtag	Enchan of the day	AGB Nielsen Urban Luzon		Kantar Media Nationwide		Prod. Code	Ref.
Episode		Chapter(s)	Original air date	Social media hashtag	Enchan of the day	Rating	Rank	Rating	Rank	Prod. Code	Ref.
77	"Engkwentro" (Encounter)	(31) New Threats for the Diwata	November 1, 2016	#EncantadiaEngkwentro	Sanctre ("Kamatayan")	25.9%	#1	23.2%	#3	324 - XXX	
78	"Kapalit" (Replacement)	(31) New Threats for the Diwata	November 2, 2016	#EncantadiaKapalit	Ssheda luna ashte livé lireo! ("Pabagsakin ang Lireo!")	27.6%	#1	22.8%	#3	326 - ZZZ	
79	"Hiram" (Barrow)	(31) New Threats for the Diwata	November 3, 2016	#EncantadiaHiram	Hartu sanctu ("Nawa'y pagpalain ka")	28.6%	#1	24.8%	#3	401 - a	
80	"Pagtulong" (Support)	(31) New Threats for the Diwata	November 4, 2016	#EncantadiaPagtulong	Ila ("Lola")	26.3%	#1	23.6%	#3	402 - b	
81	"Pag-iisa" (Isolation)	(31) New Threats for the Diwata	November 7, 2016	#EncantadiaPagiisa	A-junte ("Umawit")	26.0%	#2	25.1%	#3	404 - d	
82	"Lakas" (Strength)	(31) New Threats for the Diwata	November 8, 2016	#EncantadiaLakas	Mo-ré ("Nilalang")	27.4%	#1	26.2	#3	403 - c	
83	"Pakiusap" (Request)	(31) New Threats for the Diwata	November 9, 2016	#EncantadiaPakiusap	Intevte ashelente? ("Sa palasyo ba sila naninirahan?")	27.3%	#1	24.2%	#3	405 - e	
84	"Pagbalik" (Return)	(31) New Threats for the Diwata (32) The Return of Sang'gre Alena	November 10, 2016	#EncantadiaPagbalik	Ivo ron, esra ("Alam ko, pero...")	30.1%	#1	25.9%	#3	406 - f	
85	"Proteksyon" (Protection)	(32) The Return of Sang'gre Alena	November 11, 2016	#EncantadiaProteksyon	Emre, eshne ashte emin? ("Emre, bakit mo pinabayaan ang aking kapatid?")	29.8%	#1	26.0%	#3	407 - g	
86	"I Love You"	(32) The Return of Sang'gre Alena	November 14, 2016	#EncantadiaILoveYou	Enamuya ("Nakaraan")	27.2%	#1	25.3%	—N/a	409 - i	
87	"Nagbabadya" (Impending)	(32) The Return of Sang'gre Alena	November 15, 2016	#EncantadiaNagbabadya	Ilantre ("Saan")	25.7%	#1	—N/a	—N/a	412 - l	
88	"Sagupaan" (Battle)	(32) The Return of Sang'gre Alena	November 16, 2016	#EncantadiaSagupaan	Lira ("Brilyante")	27.6%	#1	27.5%	#3	408 - h	
89	"Peligro" (Danger)	(32) The Return of Sang'gre Alena	November 17, 2016	#EncantadiaPeligro	Isder ivi agyoi ("Natatanaw ko ang bundok.")	27.6%	#1	27.6%	#3	410 - j	
90	"Poot" (Hatred)	(32) The Return of Sang'gre Alena	November 18, 2016	#EncantadiaPoot	Emre, eshne ashte emin? ("Emre, bakit mo pinabayaan ang aking kapatid?")	27.4%	#1	26.4%	—N/a	413 - m	
91	"Bagsik" (Fury)	(32) The Return of Sang'gre Alena	November 21, 2016	#EncantadiaBagsik	Dayo ("Dayuhan")	27.8%	#1	26.1%	#3	411 - k	
92	"Hidwaan" (Discord)	(32) The Return of Sang'gre Alena	November 22, 2016	#EncantadiaHidwaan	Rehav ("Prinsesa ng Sapiro")	26.7%	#1	26.1%	—N/a	414 - n	
93	"Pagpili" (Selection)	(32) The Return of Sang'gre Alena	November 23, 2016	#EncantadiaPagpili	Ashti ("Tiyahin")	25.8%	#1	25.1%	#4	417 - q	
94	"Akala" (Thought)	(33) The Hard Battle for Power in Encantadia	November 24, 2016	#EncantadiaAkala	Asnamon Voyanazar ("Ako'y isang manlalakbay, Asnamon.")	26.5%	#1	24.1%	#4	416 - p	
95	"Walang Sukuan" (No Surrender)	(33) The Hard Battle for Power in Encantadia	November 25, 2016	#EncantadiaWalangSukuan	E corre masne e livé ("Magmahalan kayo hanggang sa dulo ng walang hanggan.")	27.4%	#1	23.8%	#3	415 - o	
Average						27.3%		25.3%			
						AGB Nielsen NUTAM		Kantar Media Nationwide			
96	"Pagkukunwari" (Pretending)	(33) The Hard Battle for Power in Encantadia	November 28, 2016	#EncantadiaPagkukunwari	Hade! ("Laban!")	23.6%	#1	26.1%	#4	418 - r	
97	"Taksil" (Traitor)	(33) The Hard Battle for Power in Encantadia	November 29, 2016	#EncantadiaTaksil	Ivi musti paneya. ("Bigyan mo ako ng tinapay.")	23.7%	#3	25.9%	#4	419 - s	
98	"Patibong" (Trap)	(33) The Hard Battle for Power in Encantadia	November 30, 2016	#EncantadiaPatibong	Musti maste Lireo! ("Kapayapaan para sa Lireo!")	23.5%	#2	25.5%	#4	420 - t	

==== December 2016 ====
Episode		Chapter(s)	Original air date	Social media hashtag	Enchan of the day	AGB Nielsen NUTAM		Kantar Media Nationwide		Prod. Code	Ref.
Episode		Chapter(s)	Original air date	Social media hashtag	Enchan of the day	Rating	Rank	Rating	Rank	Prod. Code	Ref.
99	"Tunay na Kulay" (True Colours)	(33) The Hard Battle for Power in Encantadia	December 1, 2016	#EncantadiaTunayNaKulay	Sshedi ("Ipagtanggol")	25.0%	#1	26.3%	—N/a	424 - x	
100	"Kasabwat" (Accomplice)	(33) The Hard Battle for Power in Encantadia	December 2, 2016	#EncantadiaKasabwat	Avento ("Isang daan")	24.3%	#1	26.1%	#3	423 - w	
101	"Bihag" (Captive)	(33) The Hard Battle for Power in Encantadia	December 5, 2016	#EncantadiaBihag	Ashte mashte lesnum Lireo. ("Nawa'y mapanatili ang kapayapaan sa Lireo.")	25.4%	#1	27.3%	#3	422 - v	
102	"Kalayaan" (Freedom)	(33) The Hard Battle for Power in Encantadia	December 6, 2016	#EncantadiaKalayaan	Cassiopea ("Diwatang nagbibigay liwanag sa dilim.")	25.0%	#1	25.5%	#4	426 - z	
103	"Kapangyarihan" (Power)	(33) The Hard Battle for Power in Encantadia (34) The New Beginning	December 7, 2016	#EncantadiaKapangyarihan	Encantado/Encantada ("Mamamayan ng Encantadia")	25.7%	#2	25.4%	#4	425 - y	
104	"Tagapagmana" (Heir)	(34) The New Beginning	December 8, 2016	#EncantadiaTagapagmana	Ena-i! ("Bilisan n'yo ang pagkilos!")	23.7%	#2	26.1%	#4	501 - aa	
105	"Sundo" (Fetch)	(34) The New Beginning	December 9, 2016	#EncantadiaSundo	Avisala meiste ("Paalam")	23.4%	#2	24.8%	#3	502 - bb	
106	"Pagdating" (Arrival)	(34) The New Beginning	December 12, 2016	#EncantadiaPagdating	Ade senhino ivo Minea. ("Ikaw ay anak ni Minea.")	24.1%	#1	24.9%	#4	504 - dd	
107	"Suspetsa" (Suspicion)	(34) The New Beginning	December 13, 2016	#EncantadiaSuspetsa	Ashte mashte lesnum Lireo. ("Nawa'y mapanatili ang kapayapaan sa Lireo.")	24.4%	#2	24.9%	#3	503 - cc	
108	"Plano ni Hagorn" (Hagorn's Plan)	(34) The New Beginning	December 14, 2016	#EncantadiaPlanoNiHagorn	Warka ("Bruha")	24.4%	#1	23.7%	#3	505 - ee	
109	"Danaya-Sari"	(34) The New Beginning	December 15, 2016	#EncantadiaDanayaSari	Ena-i! ("Bilisan n'yo ang pagkilos!")	23.5%	#1	24.9%	#2	507 - gg	
110	"Saklolo" (Help)	(34) The New Beginning	December 16, 2016	#EncantadiaSaklolo	Hasna verom gashne vo ("Ibigay mo sa akin 'yan kung ayaw mong mapaslang")	22.6%	#2	23.9%	#3	506 - ff	
111	"Paglusob" (Attack)	(34) The New Beginning	December 19, 2016	#EncantadiaPaglusob	Mine-a ("Niyebe")	23.6%	#1	25.5%	#4	508 - hh	
112	"Paglalakbay" (Journey)	(34) The New Beginning	December 20, 2016	#EncantadiaPaglalakbay	Mira ("Brilyante")	24.1%	#1	25.2%	#3	509 - ii	
113	"Pakay" (Purpose)	(34) The New Beginning	December 21, 2016	#EncantadiaPakay	Ergarte ivi duarte ("Ang sanggol ay may marka ng isang sang'gre")	23.0%	#1	24.2%	—N/a	512 - ll	
114	"Bitag" (Trap)	(34) The New Beginning	December 22, 2016	#EncantadiaBitag	Prosunteo ("Kahina-hinala ang kanyang kilos")	23.9%	#1	23.4%	#4	511 - kk	
115	"Balakid" (Obstacle)	(34) The New Beginning	December 23, 2016	#EncantadiaBalakid	Voya pring Devas ("Maging mapayapa nawa ang inyong paglalayag sa Devas")	23.6%	#1	24.6%	#3	510 - jj	
116	"Pagsalakay" (Assault)	(34) The New Beginning	December 26, 2016	#EncantadiaPagsalakay	—N/a	22.0%	#2	23.0%	#3	516 - pp	
117	"Salubong" (Welcome)	(34) The New Beginning	December 27, 2016	#EncantadiaSalubong	—N/a	21.8%	#1	23.8%	#3	513 - mm	
118	"Pananakot" (Threat)	(34) The New Beginning	December 28, 2016	#EncantadiaPananakot	—N/a	22.5%	#1	22.8%	#3	514 - nn	
119	"Pagdiriwang" (Celebration)	(34) The New Beginning	December 29, 2016	#EncantadiaPagdiriwang	—N/a	22.1%	#1	21.9%	#3	519 - ss	
120	"Hiling" (Wish)	(34) The New Beginning	December 30, 2016	#EncantadiaHiling	—N/a	22.7%	#1	22.7%	#3	518 - rr	
Average						23.7%		24.6%			

==== January 2017 ====
Episode		Chapter(s)	Original air date	Social media hashtag	AGB Nielsen NUTAM		Kantar Media Nationwide		Prod. Code	Ref.
Episode		Chapter(s)	Original air date	Social media hashtag	Rating	Rank	Rating	Rank	Prod. Code	Ref.
121	"Pagmamahalan" (The Bond of Love)	(34) The New Beginning	January 2, 2017	#EncantadiaPagmamahalan	23.5%	#1	22.2%	#3	EKT-601	
122	"Nais" (Desire)	(34) The New Beginning	January 3, 2017	#EncantadiaNais	23.5%	#1	21.8%	#4	EKT-602	
123	"Labanan" (Fight)	(34) The New Beginning	January 4, 2017	#EncantadiaLabanan	23.5%	#2	22.2%	#4	EKT-604	
124	"Pagkanulo" (Betray)	(34) The New Beginning	January 5, 2017	#EncantadiaPagkanulo	23.3%	#1	23.2%	#4	EKT-605	
125	"Parusa" (Punishment)	(34) The New Beginning	January 6, 2017	#EncantadiaParusa	22.6%	#2	22.4%	#4	EKT-603	
126	"Ganti" (Revenge)	(34) The New Beginning	January 9, 2017	#EncantadiaGanti	24.0%	#2	23.0%	#4	EKT-607	
127	"Pagtatanggol" (Defense)	(34) The New Beginning	January 10, 2017	#EncantadiaPagtatanggol	24.2%	#3	23.7%	#4	EKT-609	
128	"Selos" (Jealousy)	(34) The New Beginning	January 11, 2017	#EncantadiaSelos	23.7%	#2	21.8%	#4	EKT-612	
129	"Pagtugis" (Pursuit)	(34) The New Beginning	January 12, 2017	#EncantadiaPagtugis	24.0%	#1	23.5%	#4	EKT-611	
130	"Linlang" (Deceit)	(34) The New Beginning	January 13, 2017	#EncantadiaLinlang	23.3%	#2	23.5%	#4	EKT-610	
131	"Tulong" (Help)	(34) The New Beginning	January 16, 2017	#EncantadiaTulong	23.2%	#2	23.0%	#3	EKT-615	
132	"Pagbangon" (Rising)	(34) The New Beginning	January 17, 2017	#EncantadiaPagbangon	23.2%	#2	22.9%	#4	EKT-616	
133	"Siklab" (Spark)	(34) The New Beginning	January 18, 2017	#EncantadiaSiklab	24.2%	#1	23.9%	#4	EKT-618	
134	"Katapangan" (Valor)	(34) The New Beginning	January 19, 2017	#EncantadiaKatapangan	23.9%	#1	23.8%	#4	EKT-619	
135	"Pagkakaisa" (Solidarity)	(34) The New Beginning	January 20, 2017	#EncantadiaPagkakaisa	23.1%	#1	25.4%	#4	EKT-621	
136	"Apat na Sang'gre" (The Four Sang'gres)	(34) The New Beginning	January 23, 2017	#ApatNaSanggre	26.6%	#1	25.6%	—N/a	EKT-625	
137	"Desisyon" (Decision)	(34) The New Beginning	January 24, 2017	#EncantadiaDesisyon	—N/a	—N/a	24.9%	#4	EKT-622	
138	"Sakripisyo" (Sacrifice)	(34) The New Beginning	January 25, 2017	#EncantadiaSakripisyo	24.6%	#1	25.2%	—N/a	EKT-620	
139	"Para sa Encantadia" (For Encantadia)	(34) The New Beginning	January 26, 2017	#ParaSaEncantadia	24.4%	#1	25.6%	—N/a	EKT-628	
140	"Pagluluksa" (Mourning)	(34) The New Beginning	January 27, 2017	#EncantadiaPagluluksa	24.8%	#1	25.7%	#4	EKT-627	
141	"Layunin" (Goal)	(34) The New Beginning	January 30, 2017	#EncantadiaLayunin	26.0%	#2	28.0%	#3	EKT-629	
142	"Pag-asa" (Hope)	(34) The New Beginning	January 31, 2017	#EncantadiaPagAsa	25.6%	#1	26.9%	—N/a	EKT-631	
Average					24.1%		24.0%			

==== February 2017 ====
Episode		Chapter(s)	Original air date	Social media hashtag	AGB Nielsen NUTAM		Kantar Media Nationwide		Prod. Code	Ref.
Episode		Chapter(s)	Original air date	Social media hashtag	Rating	Rank	Rating	Rank	Prod. Code	Ref.
143	"Pain" (Bait)	(34) The New Beginning	February 1, 2017	#EncantadiaPain	24.6%	#1	25.6%	—N/a	EKT-702	
144	"Para kay Mira" (For Mira)	(34) The New Beginning	February 2, 2017	#ParaKayMira	26.0%	#1	26.7%	—N/a	EKT-701	
145	"Hikayat" (Persuade)	(34) The New Beginning	February 3, 2017	#EncantadiaHikayat	24.5%	#1	24.3%	#4	EKT-703	
146	"Tungkulin" (Duty)	(34) The New Beginning	February 6, 2017	#EncantadiaTungkulin	24.7%	#1	26.1%	—N/a	EKT-704	
147	"Pagpupugay" (Salutation)	(34) The New Beginning	February 7, 2017	#EncantadiaPagpupugay	23.1%	#1	25.1%	—N/a	EKT-708	
148	"Pasya" (Decision)	(34) The New Beginning	February 8, 2017	#EncantadiaPasya	24.0%	#1	25.3%	—N/a	EKT-707	
149	"Bangon" (Rise Up)	(35) The Pilgrimation of Cassiopeia (36) The Diwatas, Advocates of Peace in the New Era (37) The Rise of Avria, Queen of Etheria	February 9, 2017	#EncantadiaBangon	22.7%	#2	24.6%	—N/a	EKT-710	
150	"Avisala Luna" (Hello, Luna)	(38) The Fate of the Third Diwani	February 10, 2017	#AvisalaLuna	24.7%	#1	25.1%	#4	EKT-709	
151	"Pagkakataon" (Chance)	(38) The Fate of the Third Diwani	February 13, 2017	#EncantadiaPagkakataon	22.4%	#2	24.5%	—N/a	EKT-705	
152	"Tanong" (Question)	(38) The Fate of the Third Diwani	February 14, 2017	#EncantadiaTanong	23.0%	#1	24.2%	—N/a	EKT-712	
153	"Pagtatagpo" (Coming Together)	(38) The Fate of the Third Diwani	February 15, 2017	#EncantadiaPagtatagpo	21.6%	#2	23.8%	#4	EKT-716	
154	"Tuos" (Reckon)	(38) The Fate of the Third Diwani	February 16, 2017	#EncantadiaTuos	22.8%	#2	26.0%	—N/a	EKT-718	
155	"Dakip" (Arrest)	(38) The Fate of the Third Diwani	February 17, 2017	#EncantadiaDakip	22.6%	#1	23.7%	#4	EKT-721	
156	"Sikreto" (Secret)	(38) The Fate of the Third Diwani	February 20, 2017	#EncantadiaSikreto	23.5%	#2	25.2%	#4	EKT-720	
157	"Tiwala" (Trust)	(38) The Fate of the Third Diwani	February 21, 2017	#EncantadiaTiwala	22.0%	#1	23.6%	#4	EKT-723	
158	"Paghahanap" (Search)	(38) The Fate of the Third Diwani	February 22, 2017	#EncantadiaPaghahanap	25.1%	#1	26.3%	#4	EKT-724	
159	"Avisala Reyna Avria" (Return of Queen Avria)	(38) The Fate of the Third Diwani	February 23, 2017	#AvisalaReynaAvria	25.1%	#2	26.5%	—N/a	EKT-726	
160	"Pagbabago" (Change)	(38) The Fate of the Third Diwani	February 24, 2017	#EncantadiaPagbabago	23.0%	#1	25.0%	#4	EKT-725	
161	"Kapahamakan" (Catastrophe)	(38) The Fate of the Third Diwani	February 27, 2017	#EncantadiaKapahamakan	25.8%	#2	25.3%	#4	EKT-728	
162	"Balik Encantadia" (Return to Encantadia)	(38) The Fate of the Third Diwani	February 28, 2017	#BalikEncantadia	24.6%	#2	24.5%	#4	EKT-730	
Average					23.8%		25.1%			

==== March 2017 ====
Episode		Chapter(s)	Original air date	Social media hashtag	AGB Nielsen NUTAM		Kantar Media Nationwide		Prod. Code	Ref.
Episode		Chapter(s)	Original air date	Social media hashtag	Rating	Rank	Rating	Rank	Prod. Code	Ref.
163	"Nakatakda" (Given)	(38) The Fate of the Third Diwani	March 1, 2017	#EncantadiaNakatakda	22.8%	#2	24.5%	#4	EKT-801	
164	"Balak" (Intention)	(38) The Fate of the Third Diwani	March 2, 2017	#EncantadiaBalak	25.3%	#2	25.8%	#4	EKT-802	
165	"Pakiramdam" (Feeling)	(38) The Fate of the Third Diwani	March 3, 2017	#EncantadiaPakiramdam	23.2%	#2	25.2%	#4	EKT-803	
166	"Paghamon" (Challenge)	(38) The Fate of the Third Diwani	March 6, 2017	#EncantadiaPaghamon	26.0%	#2	26.6%	#4	EKT-804	
167	"Kagustuhan" (Will)	(38) The Fate of the Third Diwani	March 7, 2017	#EncantadiaKagustuhan	24.9%	#2	25.2%	#4	EKT-807	
168	"Alinlangan" (Doubt)	(38) The Fate of the Third Diwani	March 8, 2017	#EncantadiaAlinlangan	24.8%	#2	25.6%	#4	EKT-805	
169	"Pangangalaga" (Protection)	(38) The Fate of the Third Diwani	March 9, 2017	#EncantadiaPangangalaga	25.5%	#2	25.9%	#4	EKT-806	
170	"Utos" (Commandment)	(38) The Fate of the Third Diwani	March 10, 2017	#EncantadiaUtos	24.1%	#2	25.1%	#4	EKT-808	
171	"Hakbang" (Plan)	(38) The Fate of the Third Diwani	March 13, 2017	#EncantadiaHakbang	—N/a		24.6%	#4	EKT-809	
172	"Ganap" (Completely)	(38) The Fate of the Third Diwani	March 14, 2017	#EncantadiaGanap	—N/a		24.6%	#4	EKT-810	
173	"Piging" (Feast)	(38) The Fate of the Third Diwani	March 15, 2017	#EncantadiaPiging	—N/a		25.8%	#4	EKT-812	
174	"Pagtatalo" (Contention)	(38) The Fate of the Third Diwani	March 16, 2017	#EncantadiaPagtatalo	—N/a		25.3%	#4	EKT-811	
175	"Suliranin" (Problem)	(38) The Fate of the Third Diwani	March 17, 2017	#EncantadiaSuliranin	—N/a		23.4%	#4	EKT-815	
176	"Huwad" (False)	(38) The Fate of the Third Diwani	March 20, 2017	#EncantadiaHuwad	—N/a		25.7%	#4	EKT-814	
177	"Alitan" (Dispute)	(38) The Fate of the Third Diwani	March 21, 2017	#EncantadiaAlitan	—N/a		24.9%	#4	EKT-816	
178	"Duda" (Skeptic)	(38) The Fate of the Third Diwani	March 22, 2017	#EncantadiaDuda	—N/a		23.7%	#4	EKT-821	
179	"Gimbal" (Disturbance)	(38) The Fate of the Third Diwani	March 23, 2017	#EncantadiaGimbal	—N/a		26.7%	—N/a	—N/a	EKT-820
180	"Trahedya" (Tragedy)	(38) The Fate of the Third Diwani	March 24, 2017	#EncantadiaTrahedya	—N/a		25.1%	#4	EKT-822	
					AGB Nielsen NUTAM People		Kantar Media Nationwide			
181	"Dalamhati" (Grief)	(38) The Fate of the Third Diwani	March 27, 2017	#EncantadiaDalamhati	12.7%	#1	24.8%	#4	EKT-823	
182	"Panaghoy" (Lament)	(38) The Fate of the Third Diwani	March 28, 2017	#EncantadiaPanaghoy	13.4%	#1	26.1%	#4	EKT-825	
183	"Palaisipan" (Puzzle)	(38) The Fate of the Third Diwani	March 29, 2017	#EncantadiaPalaisipan	12.5%	#2	25.0%	#4	EKT-828	
184	"Pagpapasya" (Decisions)	(38) The Fate of the Third Diwani	March 30, 2017	#EncantadiaPagpapasya	13.1%	#1	25.6%	#4	EKT-827	
185	"Hangarin" (Dreams)	(38) The Fate of the Third Diwani	March 31, 2017	#EncantadiaHangarin	12.5%	#2	24.8%	#4	EKT-829	
Average					25.0%		25.2%			

==== April 2017 ====
Episode		Chapter(s)	Original air date	Social media hashtag	AGB Nielsen NUTAM People		Kantar Media Nationwide		Prod. Code	Ref.
Episode		Chapter(s)	Original air date	Social media hashtag	Rating	Rank	Rating	Rank	Prod. Code	Ref.
186	"Bathala" (Deity)	(38) The Fate of the Third Diwani	April 3, 2017	#EncantadiaBathala	12.6%	#2	23.9%	#4	EKT-901	
187	"Layon" (Aim)	(38) The Fate of the Third Diwani	April 4, 2017	#EncantadiaLayon	12.1%	#2	23.7%	#4	EKT-902	
188	"Liwanag" (Light)	(38) The Fate of the Third Diwani	April 5, 2017	#EncantadiaLiwanag	13.1%	#1	23.1%	#4	EKT-904	
189	"Pwersa" (Force)	(38) The Fate of the Third Diwani	April 6, 2017	#EncantadiaPwersa	13.6%	#1	24.1%	#4	EKT-903	
190	"Paniningil" (Debt)	(38) The Fate of the Third Diwani	April 7, 2017	#EncantadiaPaniningil	13.2%	#1	22.4%	#4	EKT-905	
191	"Panalangin" (Prayer)	(38) The Fate of the Third Diwani	April 10, 2017	#EncantadiaPanalangin	13.7%	#1	23.2%	#4	EKT-907	
192	"Hara" (Queen)	(38) The Fate of the Third Diwani	April 11, 2017	#EncantadiaHara	12.8%	#1	25.5%	#4	EKT-909	
193	"Paghingi" (Earn)	(38) The Fate of the Third Diwani	April 12, 2017	#EncantadiaPaghingi	12.4%	#1	23.2%	#4	EKT-911	
194	"Pagsunod" (Following)	(38) The Fate of the Third Diwani	April 17, 2017	#EncantadiaPagsunod	11.9%	#1	24.7%	#4	EKT-914	
195	"Alab" (Blaze)	(38) The Fate of the Third Diwani	April 18, 2017	#EncantadiaAlab	12.8%	#1	24.2%	#4	EKT-915	
196	"Tunggalian" (Conflict)	(38) The Fate of the Third Diwani	April 19, 2017	#EncantadiaTunggalian	11.6%	#2	24.3%	#4	EKT-917	
197	"Tulungan" (Assist)	(38) The Fate of the Third Diwani	April 20, 2017	#EncantadiaTulungan	13.5%	#1	25.0%	#4	EKT-920	
198	"Paghahangad" (Yearning)	(38) The Fate of the Third Diwani	April 21, 2017	#EncantadiaPaghahangad	11.1%	#1	23.2%	#4	EKT-924	
199	"Halik" (Kiss)	(38) The Fate of the Third Diwani	April 24, 2017	#EncantadiaHalik	11.8%	#1	22.6%	#4	EKT-925	
200	"Taktika" (Tactics)	(38) The Fate of the Third Diwani	April 25, 2017	#EncantadiaTaktika	12.3%	#2	23.4%	#4	EKT-926	
201	"Bangis" (Ferocity)	(38) The Fate of the Third Diwani	April 26, 2017	#EncantadiaBangis	11.5%	#2	23.3%	#4	EKT-928	
202	"Kakampi" (Allies)	(38) The Fate of the Third Diwani	April 27, 2017	#EncantadiaKakampi	12.3%	#1	24.1%	#4	EKT-930	
203	"Gulat" (Shock)	(38) The Fate of the Third Diwani	April 28, 2017	#EncantadiaGulat	11.2%	#2	23.0%	#4	EKT-929	
Average					12.4%		23.7%			

==== May 2017 ====
Episode		Chapter(s)	Original air date	Social media hashtag	AGB Nielsen NUTAM People		Kantar Media Nationwide		Prod. Code	Ref.
Episode		Chapter(s)	Original air date	Social media hashtag	Rating	Rank	Rating	Rank	Prod. Code	Ref.
204	"Hadlang" (Barrier)	(38) The Fate of the Third Diwani	May 1, 2017	#EncantadiaHadlang	11.8%	#1	24.4%	#4	EKT-1001	
205	"Hagkan" (Hug)	(38) The Fate of the Third Diwani	May 2, 2017	#EncantadiaHagkan	11.5%	#1	23.3%	#4	EKT-1002	
206	"Sugod" (Dash)	(38) The Fate of the Third Diwani	May 3, 2017	#EncantadiaSugod	12.9%	#1	24.9%	#3	EKT-1003	
207	"Dahas" (Violence)	(38) The Fate of the Third Diwani	May 4, 2017	#EncantadiaDahas	12.2%	#1	23.4%	#3	EKT-1004	
208	"Buhay" (Life)	(38) The Fate of the Third Diwani	May 5, 2017	#EncantadiaBuhay	12.1%	#1	23.4%	#4	EKT-1005	
209	"Devas" (Heaven)	(38) The Fate of the Third Diwani	May 8, 2017	#EncantadiaDevas	11.3%	#2	23.8%	#4	EKT-1006	
210	"Pagbawi" (Recovery)	(38) The Fate of the Third Diwani	May 9, 2017	#EncantadiaPagbawi	12.5%	#1	25.1%	#4	EKT-1007	
211	"Pagpapakumbaba" (Humility)	(38) The Fate of the Third Diwani	May 10, 2017	#EncantadiaPagpapakumbaba	11.1%	#2	22.3%	#4	EKT-1009	
212	"Udyok" (Impulse)	(38) The Fate of the Third Diwani	May 11, 2017	#EncantadiaUdyok	11.3%	#2	22.9%	#4	EKT-1008	
213	"Estasectu Encantadia" (Be Ready Encantadia)	(38) The Fate of the Third Diwani	May 12, 2017	#EstasectuEncantadia	11.2%	#2	21.9%	#4	EKT-1010	
214	"Pamamaalam" (Farewell)	(38) The Fate of the Third Diwani	May 15, 2017	#EncantadiaPamamaalam	11.6%	#1	22.0%	#4	EKT-1013	
215	"Handa" (Ready)	(38) The Fate of the Third Diwani	May 16, 2017	#EncantadiaHanda	10.7%	#2	21.7%	#5	EKT-1012	
216	"Alas" (Ace)	(38) The Fate of the Third Diwani	May 17, 2017	#EncantadiaAlas	11.5%	#2	22.0%	—N/a	EKT-1011	
217	"Digmaan" (War)	(38) The Fate of the Third Diwani	May 18, 2017	#EncantadiaDigmaan	12.0%	#1	23.8%	—N/a	EKT-1014	
218	"Ivo Livé, Encantadia" (Long Live, Encantadia)	(38) The Fate of the Third Diwani	May 19, 2017	#IvoLiveEncantadia	13.8%	#1	27.0%	#3	EKT-1016	
Average					12.8%		25.7%			
