= List of Mulawin vs. Ravena episodes =

Mulawin vs. Ravena is a Filipino fantasy television series created and produced by GMA Network starring Dennis Trillo together with an ensemble cast. It is a sequel to the fantasy series Mulawin televised in 2004 and the 2005 film, Mulawin: The Movie. It premiered on May 22, 2017 on GMA Telebabad block and also aired worldwide through GMA Pinoy TV.

NUTAM (Nationwide Urban Television Audience Measurement) ratings are provided by AGB Nielsen Philippines while Kantar Media Philippines provide Nationwide ratings (Urban + Rural).

The series ended its 17-week run on September 15, 2017, with a total of 85 episodes. It was replaced by Super Ma'am on Alyas Robin Hood's timeslot.

== Series overview ==
Month	Episodes	Monthly averages	
Month	Episodes	NUTAM	Nationwide
May 2017	8	11.3%	21.4%
June 2017	22	9.8%	19.1%
July 2017	21	10.0%	18.4%
August 2017	23	9.2%	16.4%
September 2017	11	8.4%	15.2%
Total	85	9.7%	18.1%

== Episodes ==
=== May 2017 ===
Episode		Origin4al air date	Social media hashtag	Word of the day	AGB Nielsen NUTAM People		Kantar Media Nationwide		Ref.
Episode		Origin4al air date	Social media hashtag	Word of the day	Rating	Rank	Rating	Rank	Ref.
1	"Pilot"	May 22, 2017	#MulawinVsRavena	Hunyango – chameleon	12.2%	#2	22.5%	#5	
2	"Pinuno" (Leader)	May 23, 2017	#MVRPinuno	Balasik – rigor	10.7%	#2	20.6%	#6	
3	"Pasya" (Decision)	May 24, 2017	#MVRPasya	Ugatpak – root feather	11.0%	#2	21.1%	#5	
4	"Kaibigan" (Friend)	May 25, 2017	#MVRKaibigan	—N/a	11.9%	#2	20.7%	#6	
5	"Opinyon" (Opinion)	May 26, 2017	#MVROpinyon	Tabon – half human and half Mulawin	11.6%	#2	21.2%	#5	
6	"Parusa" (Punishment)	May 29, 2017	#MVRParusa	—N/a	11.1%	#2	21.7%	#5	
7	"Lusob" (Attack)	May 30, 2017	#MVRLusob	—N/a	11.5%	#1	22.4%	#5	
8	"Pagkakataon" (Chance)	May 31, 2017	#MVRPagkakataon	—N/a	10.7%	#1	21.0%	#5	

=== June 2017 ===
Episode		Original air date	Social media hashtag	Word of the day	AGB Nielsen NUTAM People		Kantar Media Nationwide		Ref.
Episode		Original air date	Social media hashtag	Word of the day	Rating	Rank	Rating	Rank	Ref.
9	"Tulong" (Help)	June 1, 2017	#MVRTulong	—N/a	11.6%	#2	22.0%	—N/a	
10	"Tanong" (Question)	June 2, 2017	#MVRTanong	Ugatpak – root feather	10.0%	#3	19.8%	#6	
11	"Desisyon" (Decision)	June 5, 2017	#MVRDesisyon	Ravena – rival of Mulawin	10.2%	#3	19.7%	#6	
12	"Paghahanap" (Search)	June 6, 2017	#MVRPaghahanap	Tres Aves – 3 Avian warriors Selerio – a wind instrument to call Goddess Sandawa; Avila – territory of the Mulawins	9.3%	#2	19.3%	#5	
13	"Paghahanda" (Preparation)	June 7, 2017	#MVRPaghahanda	Taguba – a female group of Amazon warriors	9.8%	#3	21.1%	—N/a	
14	"Pagkakaibigan" (Friendship)	June 8, 2017	#MVRPagkakaibigan	Mulawin – winged humanoid Ugatpak – root feather Sipakbul – a football-like game of the Mulawins	9.9%	#1	18.8%	—N/a	
15	"Pagbabalik" (Return)	June 9, 2017	#MVRPagbabalik	Hunyango – chameleon Balasik – rigor	11.0%	#2	20.5%	#6	
16	"Takdang Panahon" (Right Time)	June 12, 2017	#MVRTakdangPanahon	Venado – a lake that is located at the heart of Mt. Apo	10.1%	#3	19.0%	#7	
17	"Hatol" (Judgment)	June 13, 2017	#MVRHatol	Tabon – half human and half Mulawin; Berdeng Binhi – green seed used to heal or recover from minor to extreme sick and injury by swallowing except cursed by deity.	9.6%	#2	17.8%	#7	
18	"Laban" (Fight)	June 14, 2017	#MVRLaban	Perico – a race of winged humanoids who refuses to engage in the wars between Mulawins and Ravenas	9.7%	#2	19.5%	#6	
19	"Pagtitinginan" (Esteem)	June 15, 2017	#MVRPagtitinginan	Ed-Hen – Goddess Sandawa's garden	9.5%	#4	19.3%	—N/a	
20	"Nais" (Desire)	June 16, 2017	#MVRNais	Sipakbul – a football-like game of the Mulawins	9.9%	#3	19.8%	#7	
21	"Pagtatapat" (Confession)	June 19, 2017	#MVRPagtatapat	Mulawin – winged humanoid	9.9%	#4	18.5%	#6	
22	"Pagkikita" (Meeting)	June 20, 2017	#MVRPagkikita	Sanduguan – blood compact	9.6%	#3	18.5%	#7	
23	"Paghanga" (Admiration)	June 21, 2017	#MVRPaghanga	Montenegro – family name of Savanna, Rafael and Gabriel	9.3%	#3	17.4%	#6	
24	"Katarungan" (Justice)	June 22, 2017	#MVRKatarungan	Pamamaalam – farewell Sandawa – Goddess of nature	9.6%	#3	19.7%	#6	
25	"Tapang" (Courage)	June 23, 2017	#MVRTapang	Pakdaw – A Mulawin general and the new friend of Almiro. He is the game official of Sipakbul. He is a traitor.	9.0%	#5	18.6%	#7	
26	"Paniniwala" (Belief)	June 26, 2017	#MVRPaniniwala	Hunyango – Chameleon	10.1%	#3	17.8%	#8	
27	"Plano" (Plan)	June 27, 2017	#MVRPlano	Pakbul – a ball made from feathers	10.1%	#3	18.9%	#6	
28	"Takas" (Escape)	June 28, 2017	#MVRTakas	Taguba – a female group of Amazon warriors	9.3%	#3	18.2%	#6	
29	"Damdamin" (Feeling)	June 29, 2017	#MVRDamdamin	Tuka – a former Ravena to become Mulawin. She detained Lawiswis.	9.7%	#3	19.6%	#6	
30	"Ang Paglulugon" (Avian Metamorphosis)	June 30, 2017	#MVRAngPaglulugon	Paglulugon – Avian Metamorphosis, process to change the appearance and color of feathers by feather fall.	8.2%	#5	17.5%	#6	

=== July 2017 ===
Episode		Original air date	Social media hashtag	Word of the day	AGB Nielsen NUTAM People		Kantar Media Nationwide		Ref.
Episode		Original air date	Social media hashtag	Word of the day	Rating	Rank	Rating	Rank	Ref.
31	"Pag-ibig" (Love)	July 3, 2017	#MVRPagibig	Ugatpak – root feather	9.9%	#4	19.2%	#6	
32	"Sumpa" (Swear)	July 4, 2017	#MVRSumpa	Purong-Dugo – pure-blooded	9.5%	#2	19.2%	#6	
33	"Pagligtas" (Saving)	July 5, 2017	#MVRPagligtas	Avila – territory of the Mulawins	10.7%	#2	19.4%	#6	
34	"Sagip" (Rescue)	July 6, 2017	#MVRSagip	Sandawa – Goddess of nature	9.3%	#3	17.9%	—N/a	
35	"Hiling" (Wish)	July 7, 2017	#MVRHiling	Mandarangan – Supreme deity of Mulawins	9.3%	#4	17.6%	#6	
36	"Paglaban" (Resist)	July 10, 2017	#MVRPaglaban	Pangkat Libero – a team consisting of Pagaspas, Malik and Anya in Sipakbul.	9.5%	#3	17.4%	#8	
37	"Kapalit" (In Return)	July 11, 2017	#MVRKapalit	Tierra Fuego – a place near Mt. Apo where Hacienda Montenegro is located.	9.6%	#4	16.9%	#10	
38	"Tibok ng Puso" (Heartbeat)	July 12, 2017	#MVRTibokNgPuso	Sumpit – peashooter or windpipe weapon from which poison-tipped or barbed darts are loaded.	9.3%	#3	17.0%	#8	
39	"Misyon" (Mission)	July 13, 2017	#MVRMisyon	Pulang Binhi – red seed used to convert from Mulawin into Ravena by swallowing.	9.4%	#4	16.8%	#9	
40	"Patibong" (Trap)	July 14, 2017	#MVRPatibong	Ravenum – former king of Ravena killed by Aguilus, Alwina and the alliance of Lireans and Sapirians.	8.5%	#4	16.3%	#8	
41	"Katotohanan" (Truth)	July 17, 2017	#MVRKatotohanan	Musang – Lemur tribe of the opponent of Taguba including Maningning.	9.9%	#3	17.8%	#8	
42	"Tulungan" (Cooperating)	July 18, 2017	#MVRTulungan	Propesiya ng Librong Balasik – prophecy of book of rigor	9.7%	#3	18.8%	#7	
43	"Pag-asa" (Hope)	July 19, 2017	#MVRPagAsa	Selerio – a wind instrument to call Goddess Sandawa	10.1%	#3	19.8%	#6	
44	"Pagtulong" (Support)	July 20, 2017	#MVRPagtulong	—N/a	10.3%	#3	20.3%	#6	
45	"Pagsagip" (Rescue)	July 21, 2017	#MVRPagsagip	—N/a	9.5%	#3	19.5%	#6	
46	"Sorpresa" (Surprise)	July 24, 2017	#MVRSorpresa	—N/a	10.1%	#3	17.4%	#7	
47	"Magkasama" (Together)	July 25, 2017	#MVRMagkasama	—N/a	10.4%	#3	20.6%	#6	
48	"Layunin" (Goal)	July 26, 2017	#MVRLayunin	—N/a	11.4%	#3	18.9%	#7	
49	"Sang'gre sa MVR" (Sang'gres on MVR)	July 27, 2017	#SanggreSaMVR	—N/a	10.8%	#3	18.0%	#9	
50	"Avisala MVR" (Hello MVR)	July 28, 2017	#AvisalaMVR	—N/a	11.6%	#2	18.9%	#8	
51	"Lakbay" (Travel)	July 31, 2017	#MVRLakbay	Minokawa – phoenix	10.6%	#3	19.4%	#7	

=== August 2017 ===
Episode		Original air date	Social media hashtag	Word of the day	AGB Nielsen NUTAM People		Kantar Media Nationwide		Ref.
Episode		Original air date	Social media hashtag	Word of the day	Rating	Rank	Rating	Rank	Ref.
52	"Bitag" (Trap)	August 1, 2017	#MVRBitag	Bundok Latukan – mountain occupied by Tres Aves	10.5%	#3	19.0%	—N/a	
53	"Tibay" (Durability)	August 2, 2017	#MVRTibay	Mahiwagang Hiyas – a magical gem that has the other half part of Ruwido	10.6%	#3	19.9%	#6	
54	"Sagupaan" (Encounter)	August 3, 2017	#MVRSagupaan	Mahiwagang Tirador – a magical slingshot powered by gem of Ruwido	11.0%	#3	19.4%	#7	
55	"Pasasalamat" (Thanks)	August 4, 2017	#MVRPasasalamat	Balasik – rigor	10.0%	#3	17.9%	#9	
56	"Pagsunod" (Following)	August 7, 2017	#MVRPagsunod	Ugatpak – root feather	10.1%	#3	18.1%	#8	
57	"Pag-amin" (Confession)	August 8, 2017	#MVRPagAmin	—N/a	10.0%	#3	18.7%	#6	
58	"Tensyon" (Tension)	August 9, 2017	#MVRTensyon	—N/a	8.7%	#5	16.8%	#8	
59	"Kapalaran" (Fate)	August 10, 2017	#MVRKapalaran	—N/a	8.5%	#4	17.6%	#8	
60	"Duwelo" (Duel)	August 11, 2017	#MVRDuwelo	Musang – Lemur tribe of the opponent of Taguba including Maningning.	9.2%	#3	18.1%	#7	
61	"Sanib Pwersa" (Joined Forces)	August 14, 2017	#MVRSanibPwersa	—N/a	8.4%	#5	14.7%	#14	
62	"Alas" (Ace)	August 15, 2017	#MVRAlas	—N/a	8.8%	#6	13.5%	#14	
63	"Para sa Pag-ibig" (For the Love)	August 16, 2017	#MVRParaSaPagIbig	—N/a	8.6%	#5	16.2%	#11	
64	"Kapangyarihan" (Power)	August 17, 2017	#MVRKapangyarihan	—N/a	9.7%	#3	16.0%	#9	
65	"Pagkakaisa" (Unity)	August 18, 2017	#MVRPagkakaisa	—N/a	8.4%	#6	14.6%	#12	
66	"Pagsakop" (Invasion)	August 21, 2017	#MVRPagsakop	—N/a	8.9%	#7	14.8%	#15	
67	"Kakampi" (Ally)	August 22, 2017	#MVRKakampi	—N/a	8.8%	#7	14.2%	#17	
68	"Galit" (Wrath)	August 23, 2017	#MVRGalit	Balasik – rigor	8.2%	#7	14.6%	#16	
69	"Hamon" (Challenge)	August 24, 2017	#MVRHamon	Itim na Salamangka – black magic	—N/a		14.7%	#13	
70	"Pagsubok" (Test)	August 25, 2017	#MVRPagsubok	Alampay ni Alwina – Alwina's shawl	8.7%	#4	14.3%	#15	
71	"Pagbalik" (Return)	August 28, 2017	#MVRPagbalik	—N/a	8.4%	#7	14.7%	#13	
72	"Babala" (Warning)	August 29, 2017	#MVRBabala	Magindara – Goddess Sandawa's daughter	8.8%	#6	16.2%	#11	
73	"Tapatan" (Competition)	August 30, 2017	#MVRTapatan	Puno ng Mulawin – tree of life for Mulawin, Tabon and Ravena	8.3%	#6	16.0%	#11	
74	"Pagtingin" (Esteem)	August 31, 2017	#MVRPagtingin	Halimaw nina Magindara at Siklab – monster of Magindara & Siklab	9.1%	#5	16.5%	#10	

=== September 2017 ===
Episode		Original air date	Social media hashtag	Word of the day	AGB Nielsen NUTAM People		Kantar Media Nationwide		Ref.
Episode		Original air date	Social media hashtag	Word of the day	Rating	Rank	Rating	Rank	Ref.
75	"Ang Katotohanan" (The Truth)	September 1, 2017	#MVRAngKatotohanan	Gintong Balahibo – the material that can able to control the monster son of Magindara and Siklab.	8.7%	#7	15.8%	#13	
76	"Lagim" (Gloom)	September 4, 2017	#MVRLagim	Pamamaalam – farewell tradition of the birdmen to another birdman who died.	7.7%	#6	14.7%	#14	
77	"Pakiusap" (Please)	September 5, 2017	#MVRPakiusap	—N/a	8.6%	#6	16.0%	#14	
78	"Paraan" (Way)	September 6, 2017	#MVRParaan	—N/a	7.9%	#7	15.6%	#13	
79	"Katapangan" (Courage)	September 7, 2017	#MVRKatapangan	—N/a	8.1%	#6	15.3%	#11	
80	"Lakas" (Strength)	September 8, 2017	#MVRLakas	—N/a	8.3%	#4	14.6%	#14	
81	"Pagmamahal" (Love)	September 11, 2017	#MVRPagmamahal	—N/a	8.7%	#7	13.4%	#16	
82	"Kasalan" (Wedding)	September 12, 2017	#MVRKasalan	Tak – Daughter of Alwina and Gabriel. Mulawin-Ravena-human killed monster inside the body.	8.2%	#9	14.4%	#17	
83	"Bagong Lakas" (New Strength)	September 13, 2017	#MVRBagongLakas	Gintong Balahibo – the material that can able to control the monster son of Magindara and Siklab.	8.3%	#7	15.4%	#16	
84	"Kabayaran" (Compensation)	September 14, 2017	#MVRKabayaran	Halconia – Cave occupied by Ravena as a kingdom founded by Ravenum	8.8%	#6	15.3%	#14	
85	"Pagwawakas" (Finale)	September 15, 2017	#MVRPagwawakas	—N/a	8.9%	#5	16.4%	#10	
