= Yuan Francisco =

Filipino actor and model (born 2010)

- Born: February 11, 2010 (age 16); Manila, Philippines
- Occupations: Child actor, Commercial model
- Years active: 2016-present
- Agent: GMA Artist Center (2016-present)

Yuan Francisco (born February 11, 2010) is a Filipino teenaged male actor and commercial model.

== Acting career ==
Yuan aka Pao-Pao started in print and TV commercials. He became a household name after he appeared in a series of commercials by a fabric softener and since guested in various TV shows. One of his most significant roles on TV was Encantadia 2016, where he played Pao-Pao, the bearer of the 5th gem.

== Filmography ==
Year	Title	Role	Note
2021	Agimat ng Agila	Wacky Labrador	Special Participation
2019	The Better Woman	Kawaii Castro	Supporting cast
2018	Victor Magtanggol	Carmelo "Meloy" Domingo	Supporting cast
2018	Daig Kayo ng Lola Ko	Duwen-Ding	"The Adventures of Laura Patola and Duwen-Ding"
2017-18	Impostora	Junic Saavedra	
2017	Magpakailanman	Juanlo	Episode "Golok: My Son's Imaginary Friend"
2016-17	Encantadia	Young Pao-Pao	Extended cast
2016	Karelasyon	Niko	Episode "Asset"

== Accolades ==
Year	Association	Category	Nominated work	Result
2017	31st PMPC Star Awards for Television	Best Child Performer	Encantadia	Nominated
