= Encantadia (2016 TV series) =

Philippine television drama series

- Title card
- Genre: Fantasy drama
- Based on: Encantadia (2005) by Suzette Doctolero
- Written by: Suzette Doctolero; Jason Lim
- Directed by: Mark A. Reyes V
- Creative director: Roy Iglesias
- Starring: Glaiza de Castro; Kylie Padilla; Gabbi Garcia; Sanya Lopez
- Opening theme: "Tadhana" by Bayang Barrios
- Country of origin: Philippines
- Original language: Tagalog
- No. of episodes: 218 (list of episodes)

Production
- Executive producer: Winnie Hollis-Reyes
- Production locations: Fortune Island, Philippines; Manila, Philippines
- Camera setup: Multiple-camera setup
- Running time: 25–36 minutes
- Production company: GMA Entertainment TV

Original release
- Network: GMA Network
- Release: July 18, 2016 – May 19, 2017

Related
- Etheria: Ang Ikalimang Kaharian ng Encantadia; Encantadia: Pag-ibig Hanggang Wakas; Mulawin vs. Ravena; Encantadia Chronicles: Sang'gre

Encantadia is a Philippine television drama fantasy series broadcast by GMA Network. The series is based on a 2005 Philippine television series of the same title. It served as a reboot and the fourth television series in the Encantadia franchise. Directed by Mark A. Reyes V, it stars Glaiza de Castro, Kylie Padilla, Gabbi Garcia and Sanya Lopez. It premiered on July 18, 2016, on the network's Telebabad line up. The series concluded on May 19, 2017, with a total of 218 episodes.

The series including a director's cut of the finale is streaming online on YouTube. The continuation of the series, Encantadia Chronicles: Sang'gre aired on June 16, 2025.

== Premise ==
Four sisters – Pirena, Amihan, Alena and Danaya — guard the gems that hold the power to maintain peace and harmony in the world of Encantadia. Their bond is broken when Pirena discovers that their mother, is afraid of her desire to become the queen of Encantadia.

== Cast and characters ==
Cast

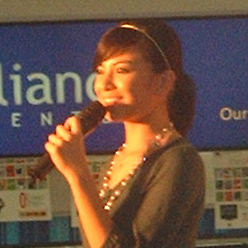
Glaiza de Castro

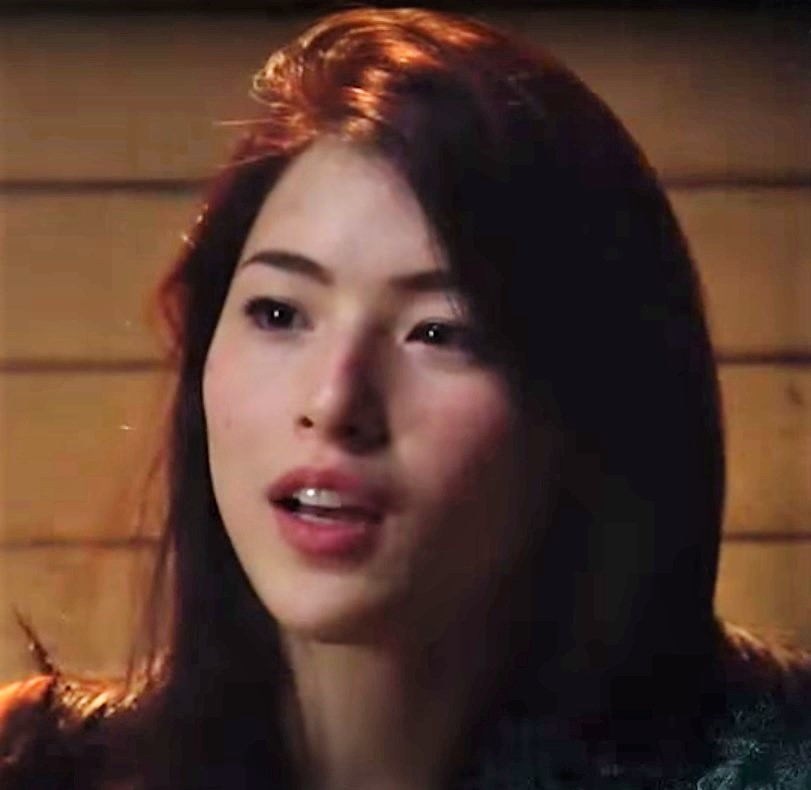
Kylie Padilla

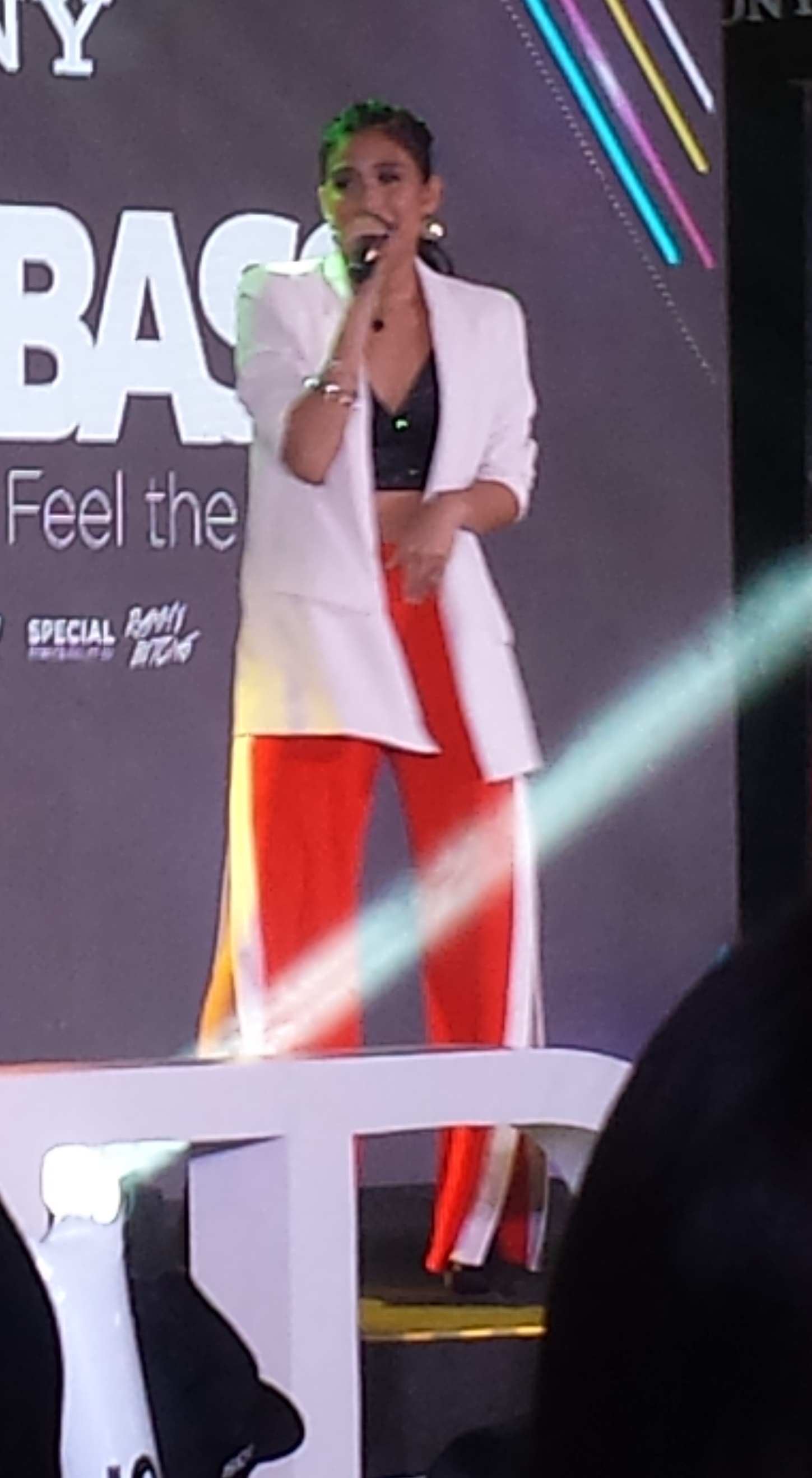
Gabbi Garcia

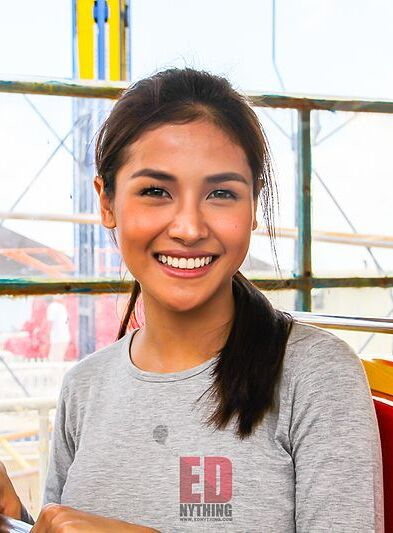
Sanya Lopez

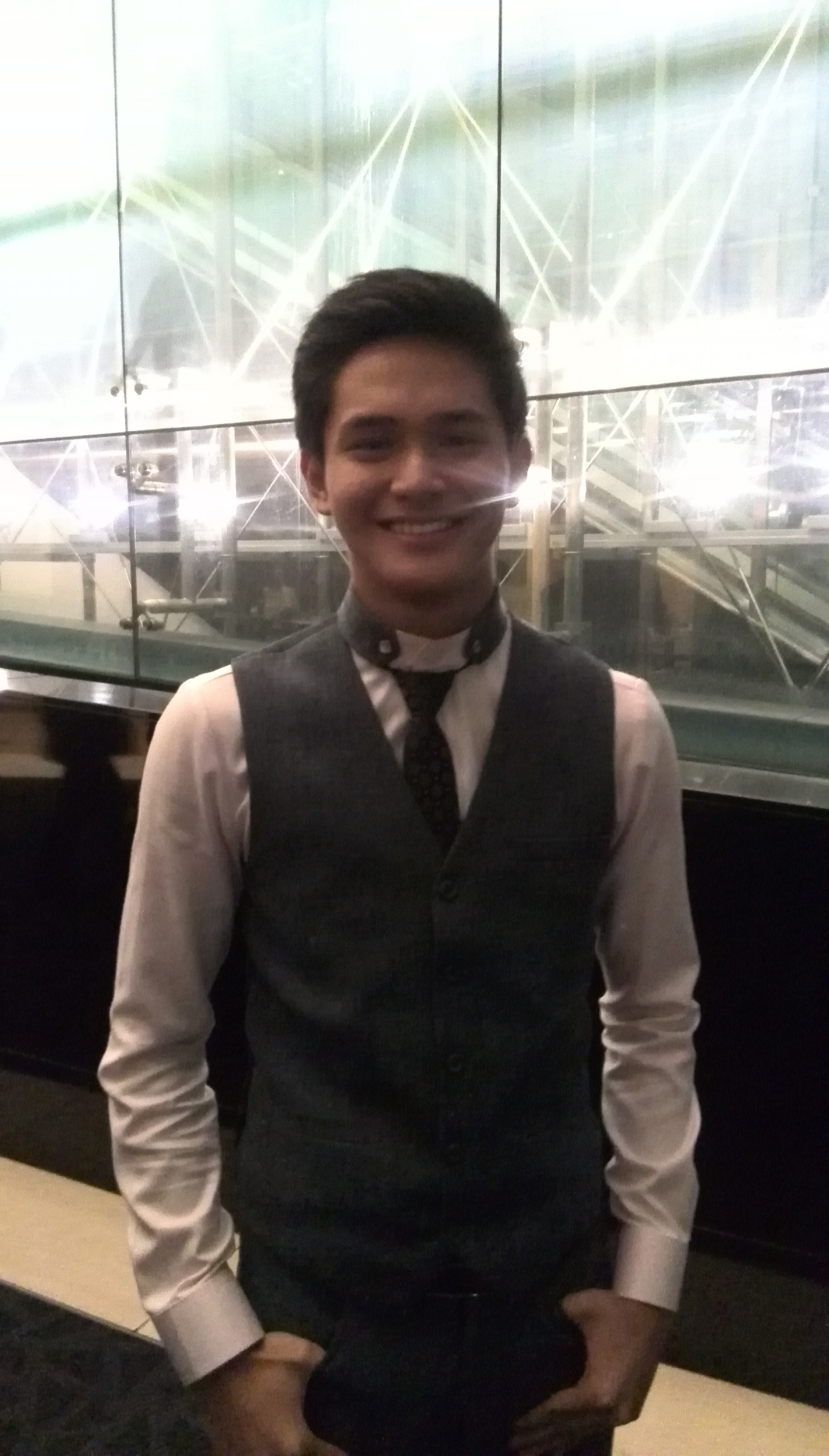
Ruru Madrid

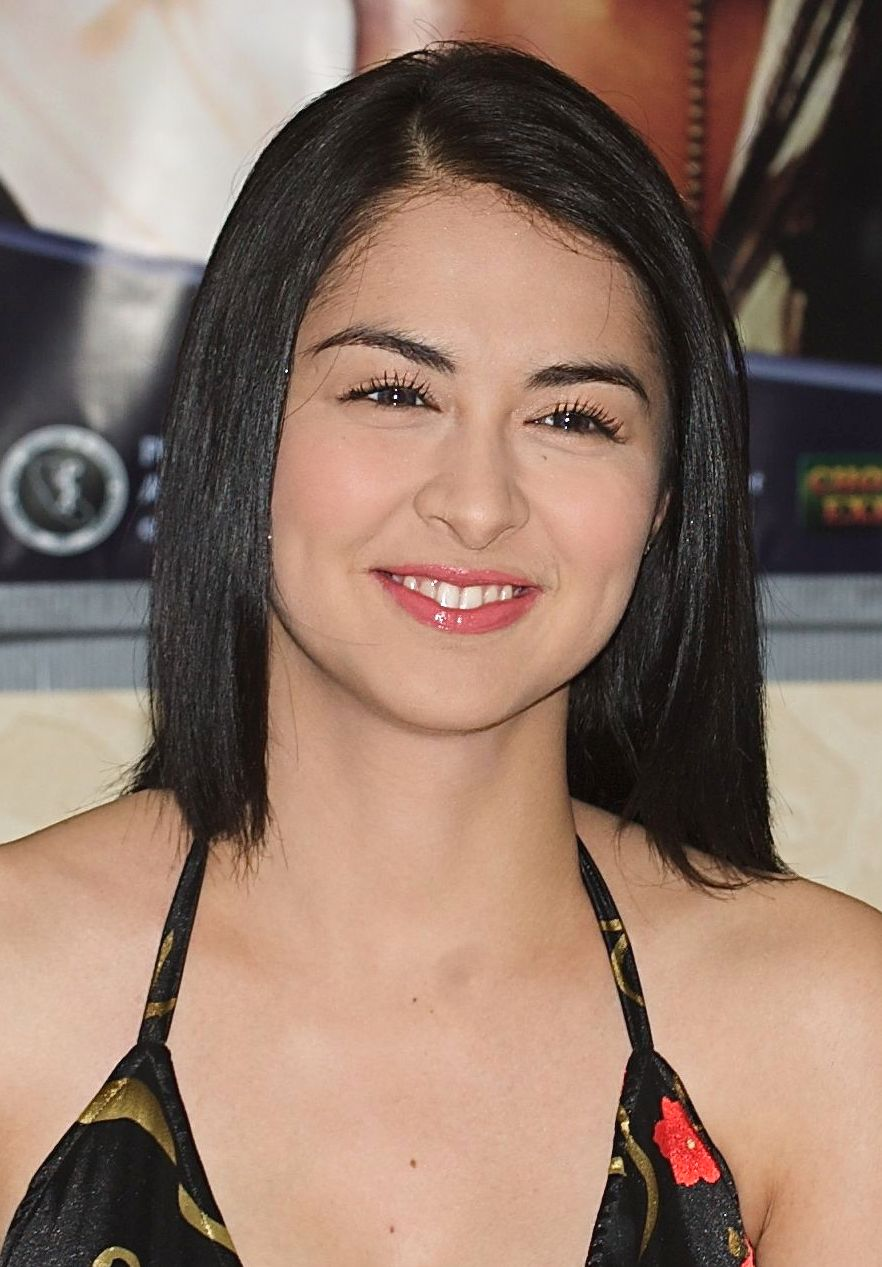
Marian Rivera

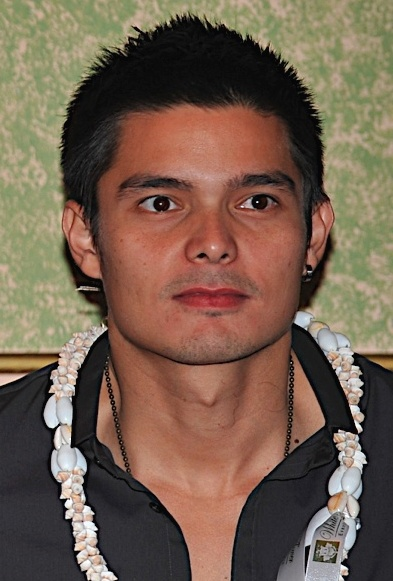
Dingdong Dantes

Lead cast

- Glaiza de Castro as Pirena
- Kylie Padilla as Amihan
- Gabbi Garcia as Alena
- Sanya Lopez as Danaya

Supporting cast

- Mikee Quintos as Lira / Milagros "Mila" Quizon
- Kate Valdez as Mira
- Rocco Nacino as Aquil
- Ruru Madrid as Ybrahim / Ybarro
- Janice Hung as Ether
- Solenn Heussaff as Cassiopeia / Avria
- Diana Zubiri as Lilasari
- Alfred Vargas as Amarro
- John Arcilla as Hagorn
- Rochelle Pangilinan as Agane / Andora
- Neil Ryan Sese as Asval
- Carlo Gonzales as Muros
- Pancho Magno as Hitano / Berdano
- Klea Pineda as Muyak
- Buboy Villar as Wantuk
- Noel Urbano as Imaw's voice
- Daniel Dasalla Bato as Abog

Recurring cast

- Inah de Belen as Deshna / Luna
- Phytos Ramirez as Paolo Carlos "Paopao" Aguirre
- Arra San Agustin as Ariana / Amihan
- Marx Topacio as Azulan
- Rey Talosig Jr. as Emre's voice
- Zoren Legaspi as Emre
- Karl Avalon as Pirena's mashna

Guest cast

- Marian Rivera as Minea
- Dingdong Dantes as Raquim
- Max Collins as Amihan
- Dayara Shane as younger Amihan / Cassandra
- Barbara Miguel as younger Pirena
- JC Movido as younger Danaya
- Althea Ablan as younger Alena
- Chlaui Malayao as younger Lira / Milagros
- Kariz Espiñosa as younger Mira
- Jestoni Alarcon as Armeo
- Roi Vinzon as Arvak
- Angelu de Leon as Amanda Reyes-Quizon
- Ryan Eigenmann as Berto Reyes
- Sunshine Dizon as Adhara
- Miguel Tanfelix as Pagaspas
- Alden Richards as Lakan
- Janine Gutierrez as Agua
- Julianne Lee as Alira Naswen
- Ken Alfonso as Gamil
- Ana Feleo as Ades
- Christian Bautista as Apitong
- Jaycee Parker as Asnara
- John Feir as Jigs
- Joanna Marie Katanyag as Choleng
- Rafa Siguion-Reyna as Enuo
- Betong Sumaya as Rael
- Leandro Baldemor as Dado Quizon
- Lindsay de Vera as Dina
- Carmen del Rosario as Rosing
- Kyle Manalo as Louie
- Arny Ross as Silvia Montecarlo
- Nar Cabico as Banjo
- Avery Paraiso as Kahlil
- Maureen Larrazabal as Lanzu
- Ge Villamil as Orthana
- Ermie Concepcion as Vita
- Ervic Vijandre as Icarus
- James Teng as Pakô
- Conan Stevens as Vish'ka
- Yuan Francisco as younger Paopao / Paolo
- Vaness del Moral as Gurna
- Wynwyn Marquez as Helgad
- Edwin Reyes as Dagtum
- Rodjun Cruz as soul gem's spirit twin
- Migo Adecer as Anthony Montecarlo
- Eula Valdez as Avria
- Andy Smith as older Anthony
- Tanya Gomez as Salome Aguirre
- Jake Vargas as Gilas
- Andre Paras as Wahid
- Joross Gamboa as Manik
- Ces Aldaba as Evades
- Mara Alberto as Kaizan
- Sheree Bautista as Odessa
- Jinri Park as Juvila
- Paolo Gumabao as Jamir
- Valeen Montenegro as Haliya
- Ian de Leon as Keros
- Lance Serrano as Memfes

== Development ==
On November 5, 2015, Felipe Gozon, the chairman and CEO of GMA Network announced that the remake of the 2005 Philippine television series Encantadia is part of the network's program line-up for 2016. On January 6, 2016, director Mark A. Reyes V said that he would return as the director of the series. Suzette Doctolero, who created Encantadia remained as concept creator and head writer for the series. It was Doctolero's first head writing project with the network in 2005, and also served as her training for writing a fantasy story.

The series was announced during Marian Rivera's renewal of contract with GMA Network on February 16, 2016, in which she was announced for the role of Mine-a. The following day, it was announced by director Mark Reyes in that the series was on pre-production. The first teaser of Encantadia premiered on February 14, 2016, featuring a snippet of the gems and the theme song. The first trailer was released June 11, 2016.

On September 15, 2016, the director stated that the retelling concluded after 43 episodes, and the 45th will be the start of the 2005's sequel. He further added that it was not about 2005 version anymore, and new storyline will emerge on the series.

=== Casting ===
Marian Rivera plays the role of Mine-a. Dingdong Dantes who played Ybarro in the 2005 Encantadia series, plays the role of Raquim. Klea Pineda and Migo Adecer also joined the cast as part of their prize after winning StarStruck.

On April 4, 2016, it was announced Kylie Padilla, Gabbi Garcia, Sanya Lopez and Glaiza de Castro were hired for the lead roles. According to Doctolero, de Castro is the only choice for the role she auditioned for. According to her, she watched and studied trainings from famous martial arts artists to get ready for the role. Other cast members including their roles also appeared after the announcement.

Sunshine Dizon, who played Pirena in the 2005 series, revealed on May 6, 2016, that she is part of the series in a supporting role, as Adhara. Dizon stated that her character was originally planned to be the archenemy of the series; however, it was cut short due to her being already cast in a leading role as Emma for a then-upcoming television series, Ika-6 na Utos. Later in the series, Diana Zubiri who played Danaya in 2005 series was cast in a supporting role making her, alongside Alfred Vargas, the cast members from the original series to appear regularly throughout the reboot series.

A week before the show, Australian actor Conan Stevens, best known for his role on the American fantasy television series Game of Thrones, confirmed that he would join the cast in an unspecified role, which later on revealed as Vish'ka.

In July 2016, Miguel Tanfelix joined the series as Pagaspas, a Mulawin with a mission to help the fairies of Lireo. Tanfelix reprised his role from the Philippine television fantasy drama series, Mulawin. In August 2016, Alden Richards was cast as a Mulawin. Richards said "I watched the show with my family and I was so mesmerized with all the special effects. [...]When I learned that GMA was doing a 'requel' of Encantadia, I was really wishing to be a part of the show. That's why when they told me that I have a role in the series, I was so happy."

== Production ==
Principal photography commenced on April 20, 2016.

=== Costumes ===
"The process is the same as when we make our signature gowns for clients here and abroad. Since the designs I've made still include my signature details, it was not that hard for me and my team to create the costumes. The only difference is that we had to consider how these gowns would appear against chroma optical filters used in television as Encantadia is a telefantasia which requires chroma."

— Libiran, on how Encantadia costumes were made.

The series' costume designer is Francis Libiran, a world-renowned and critically acclaimed designer in the Philippines who did an extensive research to come up with the designs. According to Libiran, his team brainstormed together with Encantadia's production team and watched old clips of Encantadia in YouTube to conceptualized the character's fashion sense. The gowns of the sang'gres and Ynang Reyna is more edgy and fashionable compared to the ruggedness/cocky-themed costumes in 2005. Each gown depicts the powers and personalities of each sang'gre while showing one thing that they have in common- Royal. The colors of their gowns match the colors of the gems that the Sang’gres are guarding. Just like in the original series, they wore elegant gowns when they were not in a battle. He further stated, "A normal gown usually takes us two months to create but since we had to consider the time, we assigned a dedicated team of craftsmen to produce the outfits in just 15 days." According to the cast, they went on a strict diet and fitness trainings to secure their shape suited for their exquisite gowns. The cast first appeared in costumes during "ToyCon 2016 Poplife Fan Xperience" at the SMX Convention Center, Pasay on June 10, 2016.

== Reception ==
=== Ratings ===
According to AGB Nielsen Philippines' Mega Manila household television ratings, the pilot episode of Encantadia earned a 26.1% rating. The final episode scored a 13.8% rating in Nationwide Urban Television Audience Measurement people in television homes.

=== Critical response ===
According to a review by CNN Philippines, Encantadia lived up to its long-gestating hype. The introduction and the narration was a big step-up for the show compared to the first one. It further stated that the new iteration looks better than the original and paces itself well in terms of narrative and plot. CNN was also impressed with the fight scenes giving impressions that are being done on a grander scale. They also stated that the scenes have depth and CG backgrounds are rendered beautifully and looks a lot slicker and a whole lot darker, looking like something from the PC version of The Elder Scrolls V: Skyrim which they expressed as a huge improvement after over a decade. Anthea Reyes of WheninManila.com was also impressed of the series stating: "...all of our childish fantasies have returned to primetime television and it’s come back bigger, better, and infinitely more awesome..." She also stated that "the writing team is using this opportunity to the fullest to solidify the myth, the plot holes, and the motivations of everything. The writers of the show were able to place meaning in an aesthetic choice made from way before and further enrich the story." She also noted that the details of characters costume, to the clarified presence of the nomadic soldiers post Sapiro-Hathoria war, up until the background music used per every shot were all world class. FHM Philippines made a review of the series and stated that the creators of the show made an effort to make a living and breathing world and they succeeded. They also imposed that even though it was heavily inspired by Hollywood fantasy movies, it has the Filipino flavor adding its own twist. They also pointed out that one of the shows strengths is that it has its own unique story. FHM further stated that: "...Like the original that came 11 years before it, Encantadia gives audiences something new to watch when it comes to primetime programming. Finally, something to cleanse our palate from all the drama and romantic programs that we've grown accustomed to."

James Patrick Anarcon of PEP stated that the series' director of photography and cameramen were impressive for utilizing different creative camera angles and techniques as it contributed to the intensity and excitement in the scene. They also gave positive feedback to its musical scoring stating that "...One of the factors that contributed to Encantadia 2005’s success is its musical scoring, in fact, it was even commended in the Asian Television Awards for Best Original Music Score. This requel did not disappoint when it comes to this aspect. The musical scorer seemed to compose different pieces suited to each kingdom since each had its own theme[...]the modernized, upbeat version of "Tadhana" also intensified the fight scenes."

== Accolades ==
Accolades received by Encantadia
Year	Award	Category	Recipient	Result	Ref.
2016	Gawad Filipino Media People's Choice Awards	Best Fantaserye of the Year	Encantadia	Won	
2016	Gawad Filipino Media People's Choice Awards	Pinaka Mahusay na Actor sa Television	John Arcilla	Won	
2016	Gawad Filipino Media People's Choice Awards	Pinaka Mahusay na Actress sa Television	Glaiza de Castro	Won	
2016	Anak TV Seal Awards	Favorite TV Program	Encantadia	Won	
2017	31st PMPC Star Awards for Television	Best Drama Actor	Ruru Madrid	Won	
2017	31st PMPC Star Awards for Television	Best Drama Actress	Sanya Lopez	Nominated	
2017	31st PMPC Star Awards for Television	Best New Male TV Personality	Migo Adecer	Nominated	
2017	31st PMPC Star Awards for Television	Best New Female TV Personality	Mikee Quintos Klea Pineda	Won	
2017	31st PMPC Star Awards for Television	Best New Female TV Personality	Mikee Quintos Klea Pineda	Nominated	
2017	31st PMPC Star Awards for Television	Best Child Performer	Yuan Francisco	Nominated	
2017	Apollo Awards	Best Visual Effects - Long-term Category	Encantadia	Won	
2017	UmalohokJuan Awards	TV Drama Program of the Year	Encantadia	Won	

== Legacy ==
In July 2017, actresses Glaiza de Castro and Mikee Quintos both appeared in the 2017 Philippine television fantasy drama series Mulawin vs. Ravena in a guest role, portraying the same character they played in Encantadia (2016).

== Sequel ==
A spin-off television series, Encantadia Chronicles: Sang'gre was announced on December 31, 2021, for a 2022 release. The series premiered on June 16, 2025 on GMA Network.
