= Mulawin vs. Ravena =

2017 Philippine television drama series

- Title card
- Genre: Fantasy drama
- Created by: Don Michael Perez
- Written by: Don Michael Perez; Des Garbes-Severino; Luningning Ribay
- Directed by: Dominic Zapata; Don Michael Perez
- Creative director: Roy C. Iglesias
- Starring: Dennis Trillo
- Theme music composer: Jay Durias
- Opening theme: "Ikaw Nga" by Regine Velasquez / Top One Project
- Composer: South Border (rearranged by Raul Mitra)
- Country of origin: Philippines
- Original language: Tagalog
- No. of episodes: 85 (list of episodes)

Production
- Executive producer: Darling Pulido-Torres
- Production locations: Makati, Philippines
- Camera setup: Multiple-camera setup
- Running time: 26–48 minutes
- Production company: GMA Entertainment TV

Original release
- Network: GMA Network
- Release: May 22 – September 15, 2017

Related
- Mulawin; Mulawin: The Movie; Encantadia

Mulawin vs. Ravena is a 2017 Philippine television drama fantasy series broadcast by GMA Network. The series served as a sequel to the 2004 Philippine television series Mulawin and the 2005 Philippine film Mulawin: The Movie. Directed by Dominic Zapata and Don Michael Perez, it stars Dennis Trillo. It premiered on May 22, 2017, on the network's Telebabad line up. The series concluded on September 15, 2017, with a total of 85 episodes.

The series is streaming online on YouTube.

== Premise ==
Ever since Ravena's breakaway from Avian, Mulawin and Ravena have been at war, fighting against each other over humans. Both have had histories of love affairs with humans, which resulted to half-blood offspring. The dilution of their race has made Mulawins and Ravenas mortal like humans. The desire for immortality leads to the next chapter of the Mulawin-Ravena war.

== Cast and characters ==
Cast

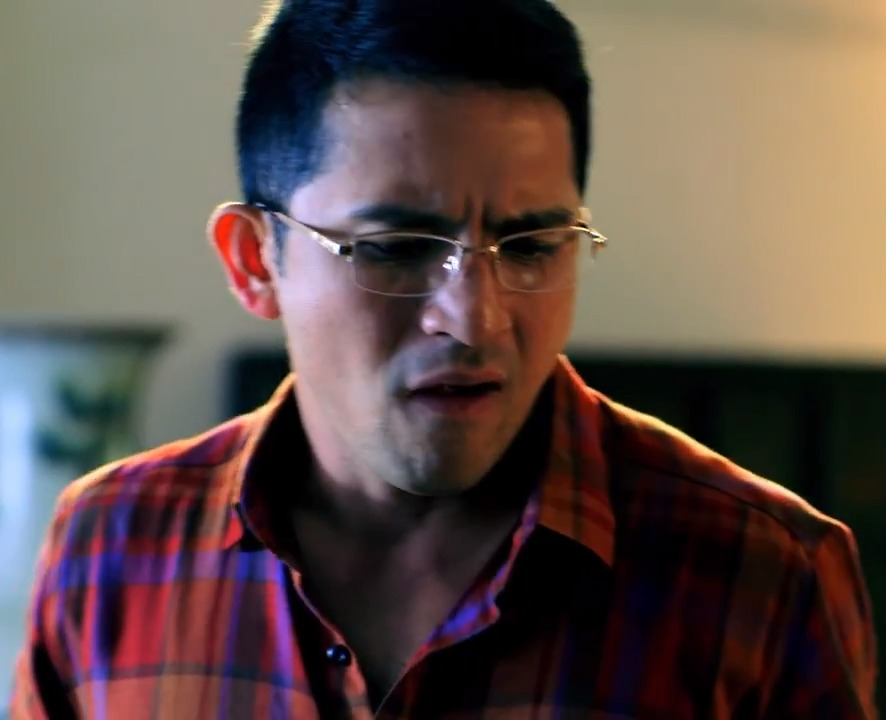
Dennis Trillo

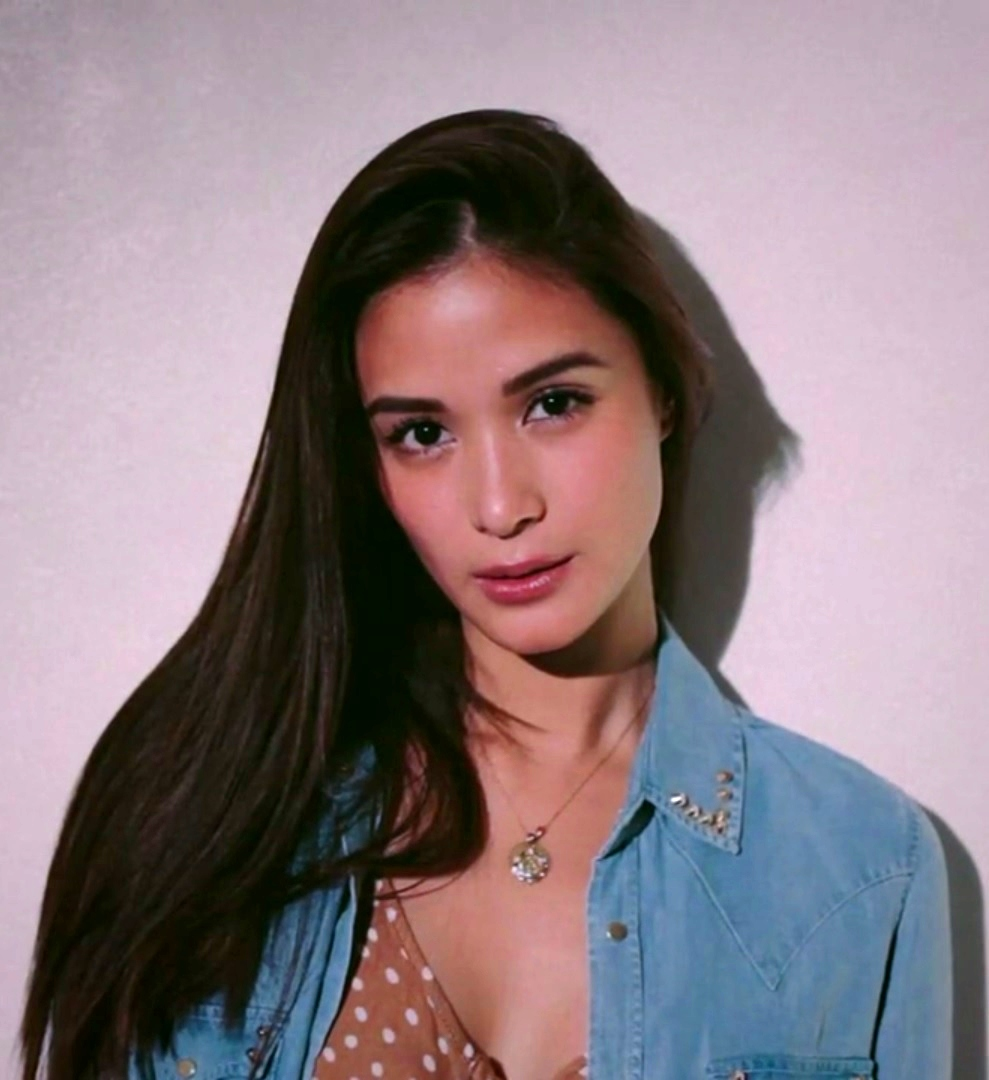
Heart Evangelista

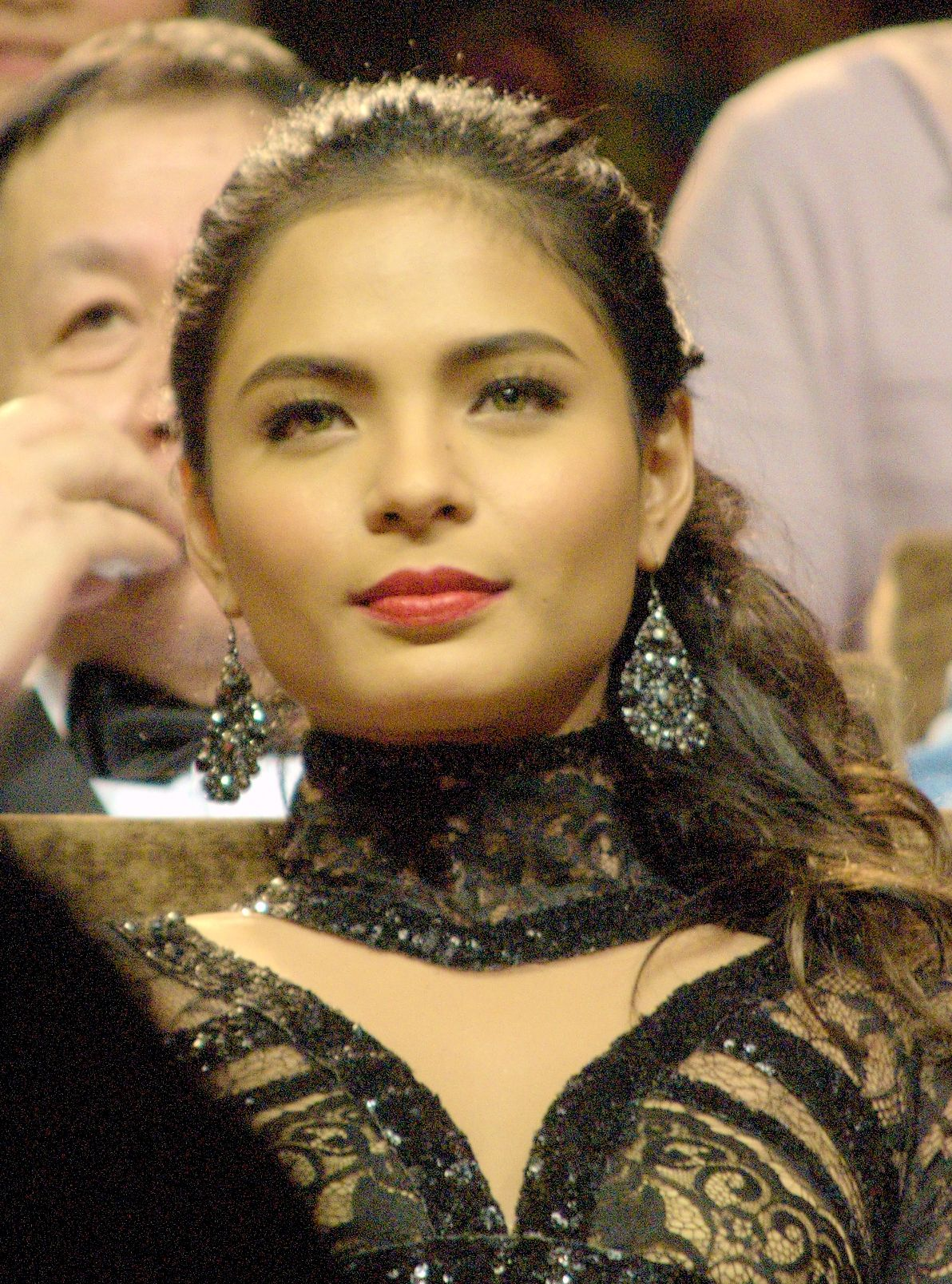
Lovi Poe

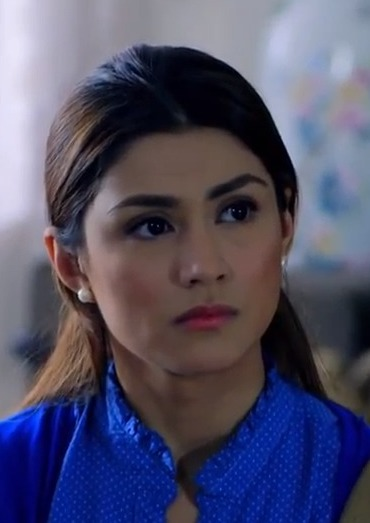
Carla Abellana

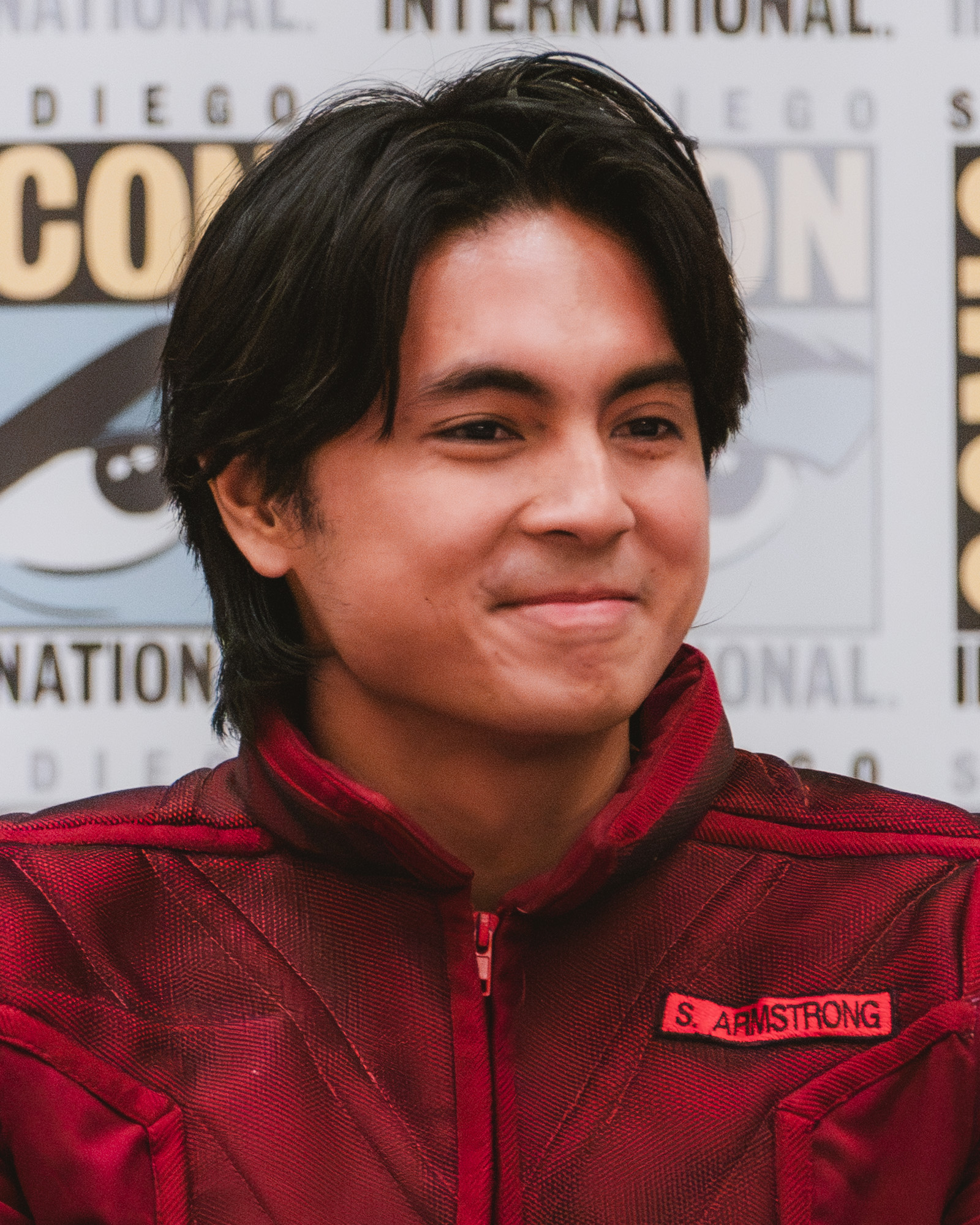
Miguel Tanfelix

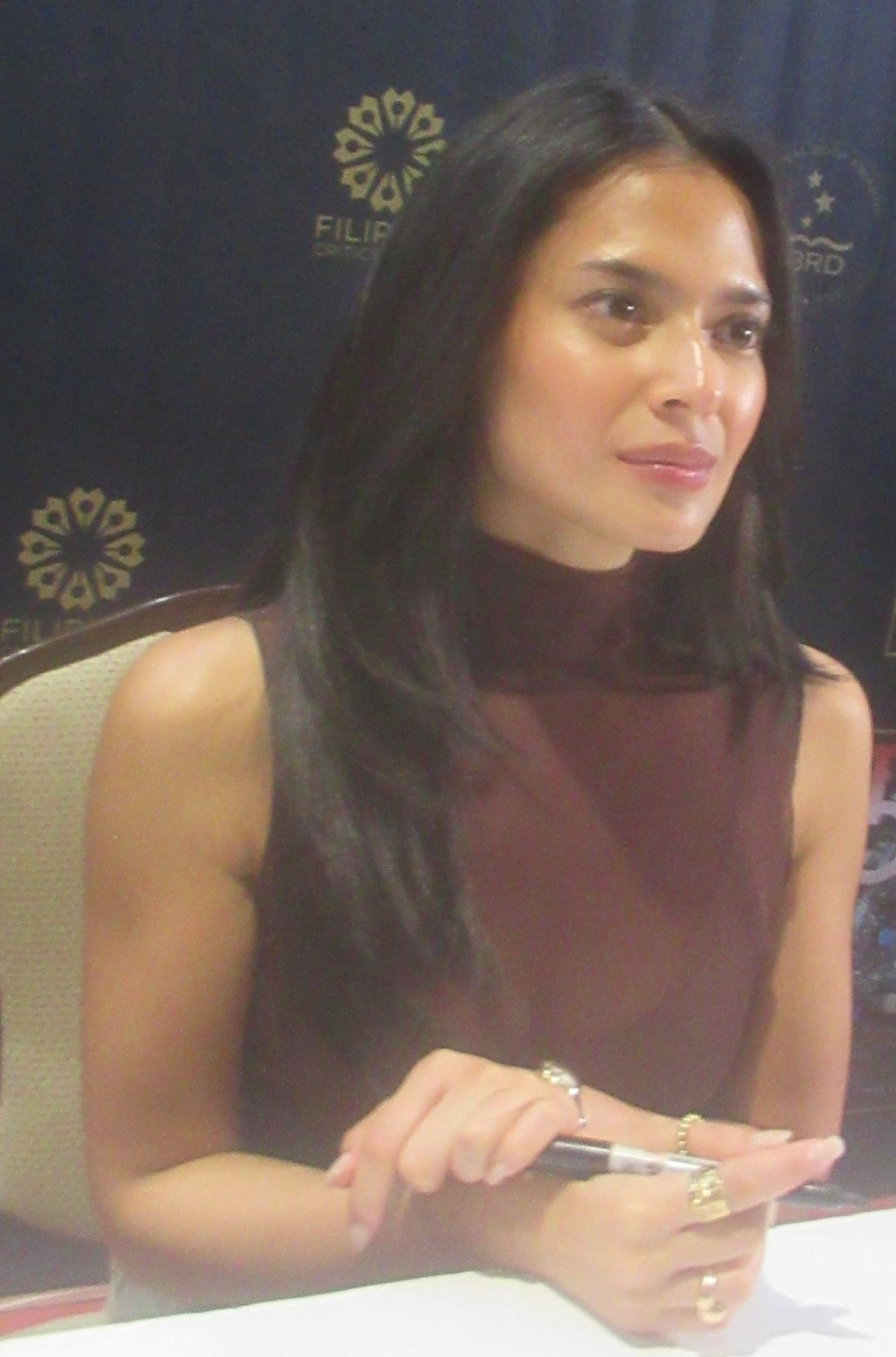
Bianca Umali

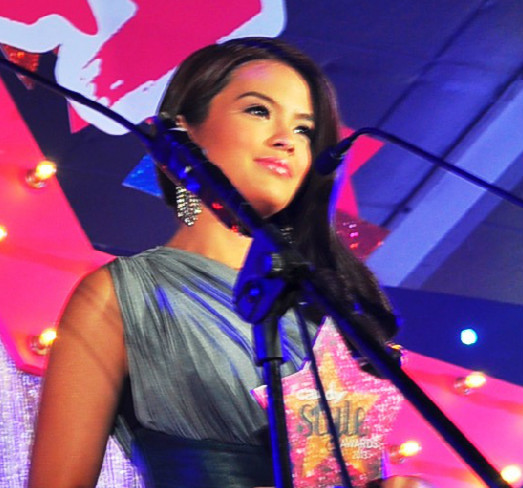
Bea Binene

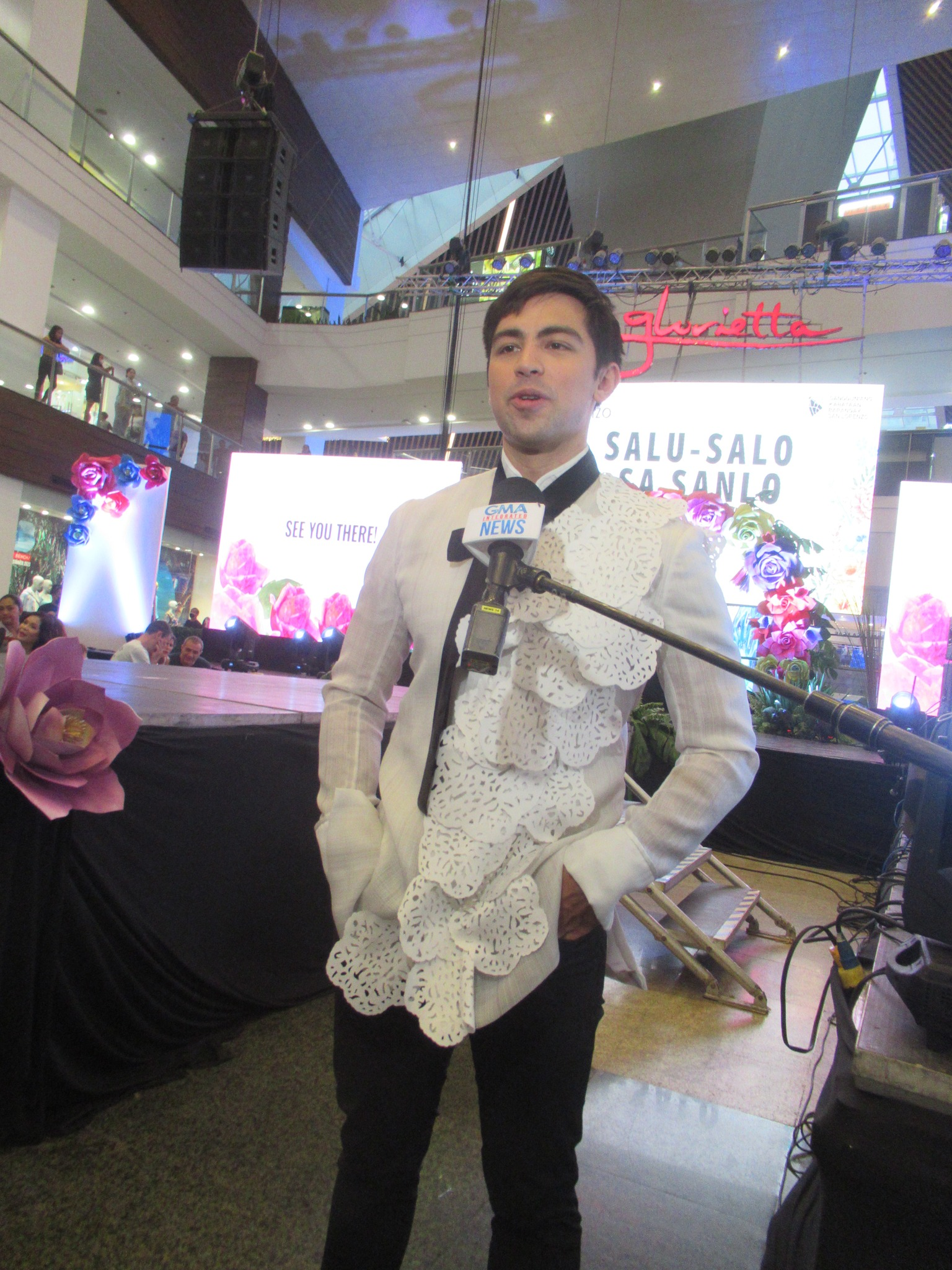
Derrick Monasterio

Cast

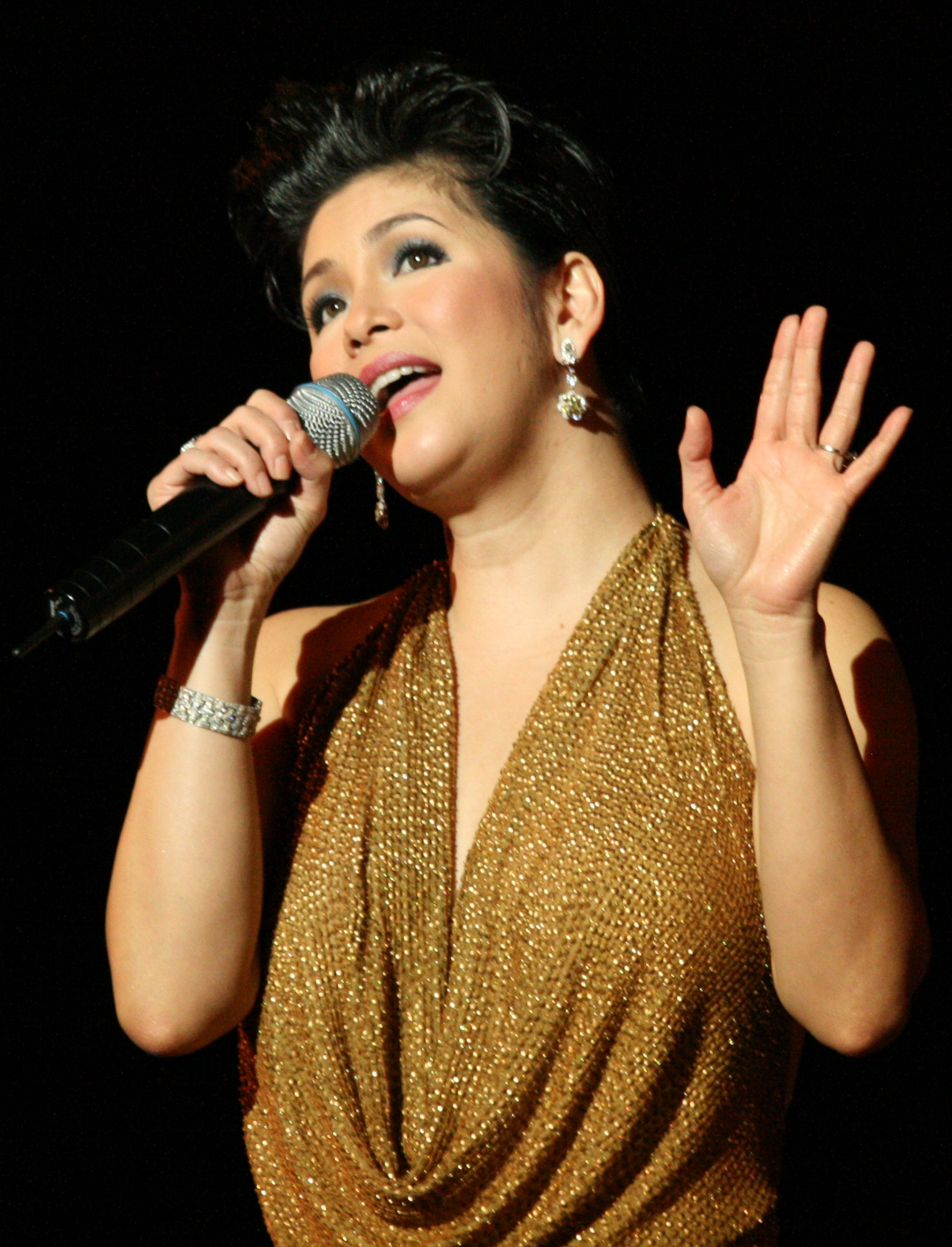
Regine Velasquez

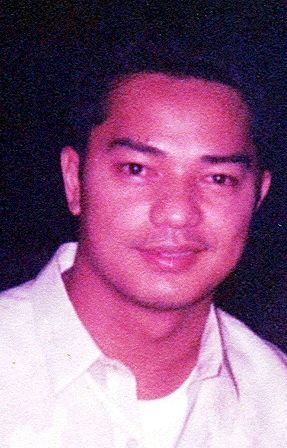
Ariel Rivera

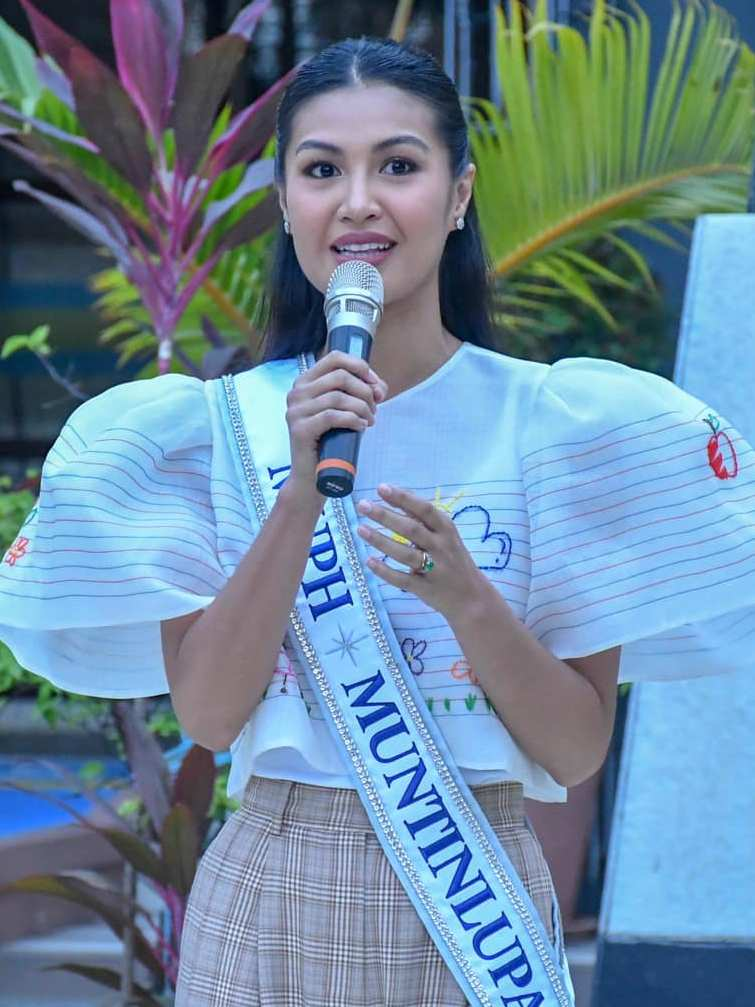
Winwyn Marquez

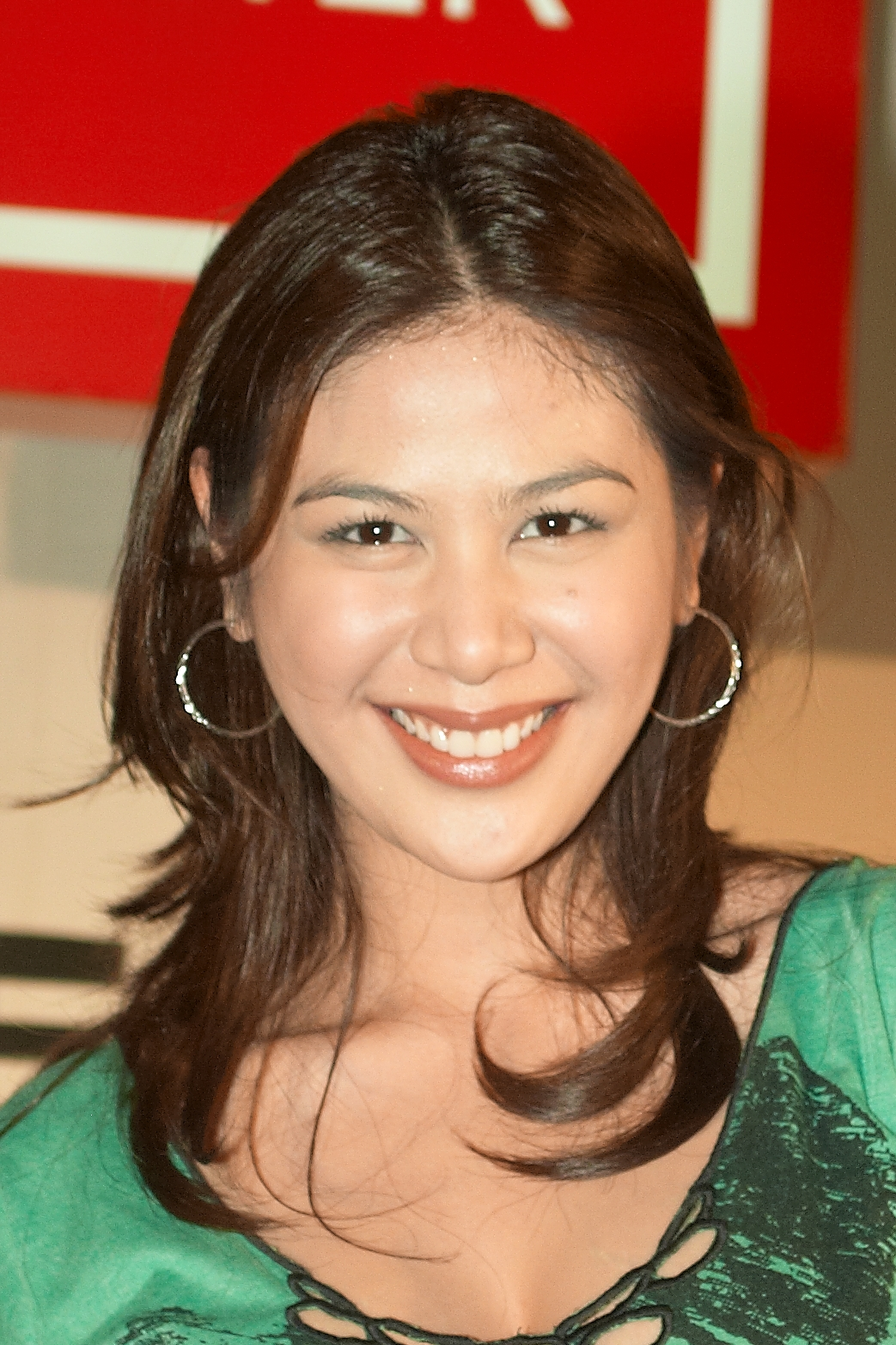
Valerie Concepcion

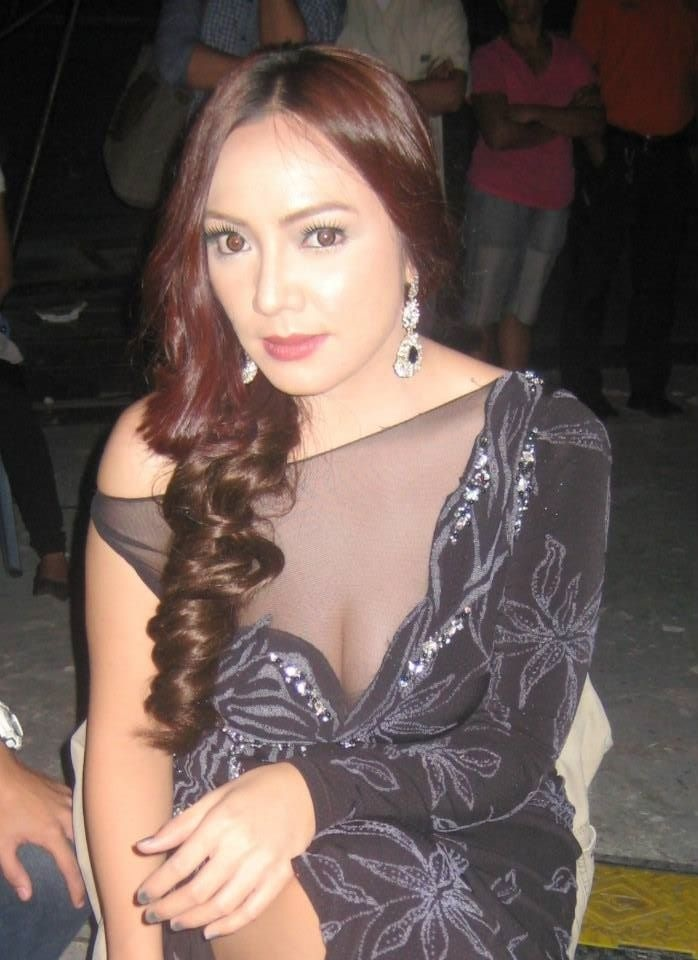
Shermaine Santiago

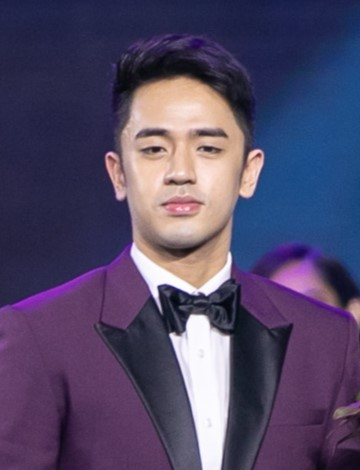
David Licauco

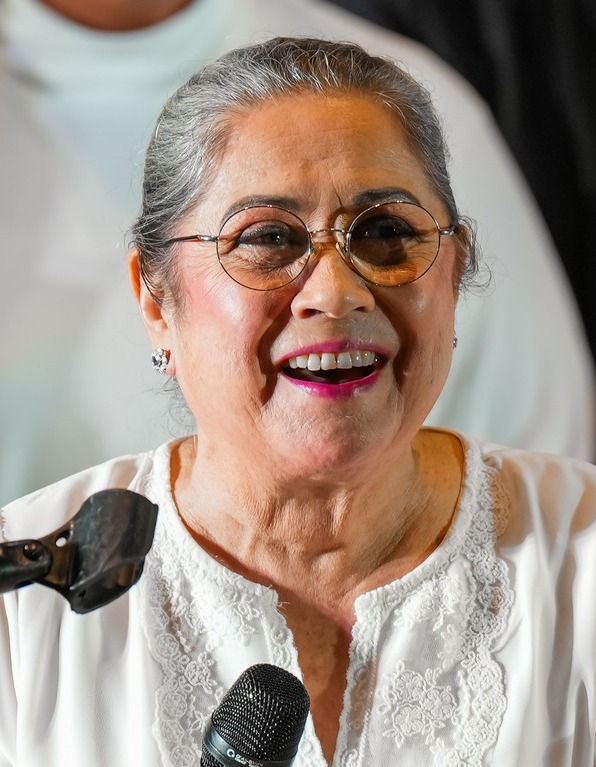
Nova Villa

=== Lead cast ===
- Dennis Trillo as Gabriel Montenegro - son of Ravenum and Alwina's childhood friend.
- Heart Evangelista as Alwina - Gabriel's childhood friend and the mother of Almiro and Tak.
- Lovi Poe as Magindara - daughter of Sandawa and Mandarangan.
- Carla Abellana as Aviona - Rodrigo's wife and Anya's mother.
- Miguel Tanfelix as Pagaspas / Gas / Paggy / Bogart - Lawiswis' childhood friend and Lourdes' adoptive son.
- Bianca Umali as Lawiswis / Wis / Emily - Tuka's adoptive daughter and Pagaspas' childhood friend.
- Kiko Estrada as Rafael Montenegro - Savanna's son.
- Bea Binene as Anya Manalastas - daughter of Aviona and Rodrigo.
- Derrick Monasterio as Almiro / Rodrigo Manalastas - son of Alwina and Aguiluz.

=== Supporting cast ===
- Regine Velasquez as Sandawa - Mandarangan's wife and the mother of Magindara, Lumad and Dakila. The guardian of Eden and the Balasik.
- Roi Vinzon as Daragit - a Mulawin and member of the Council of Elders.
- Ariel Rivera as Panabon - half Mulawin.
- Chynna Ortaleza as Rashana - Gabriel's wife, Wak's mother and Tak's stepmother.
- TJ Trinidad as Greco - Gabriel's right-hand man.
- Martin del Rosario as Aramis - Lourdes' son.
- Dion Ignacio as Siklab / Tayag - son of Vultra and Daragit.
- Wynwyn Marquez as Ribay - Rashana's right-hand woman.
- Valerie Concepcion as Tuka - Lawiswis' adoptive mother.
- JC Tiuseco as Tangos - Daragit's henchman.
- Juan Rodrigo as tandang Lumbas - eldest of the Mulawins.
- Shermaine Santiago as Maningning - leader of the Tagubas.
- Joey Paras as Dakdak - leader of the Periko tribe.
- David Licauco as Malik - Anya, Lawiswis, Pagaspas, and Almiro's childhood friend.
- Angelu De Leon as Lourdes - Pagaspas and Alwina's adoptive human mother and Aramis' mother.
- Bobby Andrews as Dionisio - member of the Lumad group.
- Joko Diaz as Antonio - Savanna's accomplice.
- Charee Pineda as Savannah Montenegro - Rafael's mother.
- Dexter Doria as Rosing - a human member of the Council of Elders.
- Nova Villa as Consuelo "Elo" Manalastas - Almiro's adoptive human mother and Rodrigo's mother.

=== Recurring cast ===
- Seth dela Cruz as Uwak-ak "Wak" - Rashana and Gabriel's son.
- Caprice Cayetano as Tagaktak "Tak" - Alwina and Gabriel's daughter.

=== Guest cast ===
- Tom Rodriguez as Rodrigo - Aviona's husband
- Leanne Bautista as younger Anya
- Dentrix Ponce as younger Almiro
- Marc Justin Alvarez as younger Pagaspas
- Althea Ablan as younger Lawiswis
- Josh Clement Eugenio as younger Rafael
- Geson Grenado as younger Malik
- John Feir as Banoy - leader of the Très Avés.
- Jeff Carpio as Laab - leader of the Musang tribe.
- Bryan Benedict as Ningas - Siklab's friend.
- Kirst Viray as Ronnie - Savanna's servant.
- Jordan Hong as Sandro
- Elle Ramirez as Uyak - Tangos' wife.
- Ashley Cabrera as Tisay
- Carlon Matobato as Balatkayo
- Froilan Sales as Bagyo
- Victoria Quinn as Silayan
- Mike Lloren as Diosdado - Dionisio's father.
- Ollie Espino as Amang - Malik's father.
- Kristoffer Martin as Libero - Lagrimas' son.
- Lharby Policarpio as Pakdaw - soldier in Avila and captain of Sipakbul fest.
- Sherilyn Reyes-Tan as Lagrimas, mother of Libero.
- Mega Unciano as Periko - Dakdak's friend.
- Paolo Gumabao as Ryan - Rafael's rival for Marga.
- Jazz Ocampo as Marga - Rafael's crush.
- B Delgado as Patty - a Tabon.
- Angela Evangelista as Riya - friend of Patty.
- Krisha Kae Francisco as Oyayi - member of the Taguba tribe.
- Ayra Mariano as Selda - Lumbas' daughter.
- Ameera Johara as Langay - member of Tres Aves.
- Yasser Marta as Palong - member of Tres Aves.
- Vince Gamad as Kalaw - member of Tres Aves.
- Kenken Nuyad as Lazcano - leader of the Scout group.
- Jacob Briz as a scout member - member of the Scout group.
- Glaiza de Castro as Pirena - a fairy from Encantadia.
- Mikee Quintos as Lira - niece of Pirena.
- Pekto as Simeon - Bogart's adoptive father.
- Joanna Marie Katanyag as Adora - Bogart's adoptive mother.
- Lianne Valentin as Shiela
- Maureen Larrazabal as Belinda - Shiela's mother.
- Will Ashley de Leon as older Wak
- Ayeesha Martinez as older Tak

The cast of Mulawin (2004) and Mulawin: The Movie (2005) including Richard Gutierrez, Angel Locsin, Michael de Mesa, Gary Estrada, Romnick Sarmienta, Bianca King, Sam Bumatay, Miguel Tanfelix, Amy Austria, Eddie Gutierrez, Zoren Legaspi, Karen delos Reyes, Nicole Anderson, Paolo Contis and Boy2 Quizon appeared in archived footage.

== Development ==
The first appearance of the Mulawin in 12 years occurred in Encantadia (2016) starring Miguel Tanfelix as Pagaspas, the same actor who portrayed the same character in 2004. It was followed by a guest appearance of Alden Richards in the same series as Lakan. In Encantadia (2005), the Mulawins also made several appearances including Avilan, the leader of the Mulawins serving as a spirit guide to Amihan. The series was announced during GMA Network's New Year Countdown, with the official title as Mulawin vs. Ravena as part of the network's line-up in 2017.

=== Casting ===
In November 2016, Popoy Caritativo, manager of actor Dennis Trillo posted an Instagram photo regarding his meeting with GMA Network executives including Cheryl Ching-Sy, AVP for Drama regarding the sequel of the hit 2004 series, Mulawin. Trillo was also present in the said meeting which was later revealed to topbill the upcoming series, in a yet to be determined role. In December 2016, Alden Richards and Miguel Tanfelix who both appeared in Encantadia (2016) as Lakan and Pagaspas respectively were also announced to be part of show. On January 16, 2017, more cast members were announced which included Regine Velasquez. Dennis Trillo and Miguel Tanfelix reprised their roles from the 2004 television series and 2005 film as Gabriel and Pagaspas respectively.

In July 2017, actresses Glaiza de Castro and Mikee Quintos made an appearance as Pirena and Lira respectively, who both originated from the Philippine television fantasy drama series Encantadia (2016).

== Production ==
Principal photography commenced on March 16, 2017.

== Ratings ==
According to AGB Nielsen Philippines' Nationwide Urban Television Audience Measurement People in television homes, the pilot episode of Mulawin vs. Ravena earned a 12.2% rating. The final episode scored an 8.9% rating.

== Accolades ==
Accolades received by Mulawin vs. Ravena
Year	Award	Category	Recipient	Result	Ref.
2017	31st PMPC Star Awards for Television	Best Primetime Drama Series	Mulawin vs. Ravena	Nominated	
