= 26th Luna Awards =

2009 Philippine film awards ceremony

- Date: February 8, 2009
- Site: Mandarin Oriental Suites, Gateway Mall, Araneta Center, Quezon City
- Hosted by: Gina Alajar; Robert Arevalo; Tirso Cruz III; Lorna Tolentino

Highlights
- Best Picture: A Love Story
- Most awards: A Love Story (5)
- Most nominations: A Love Story (9)

The 26th Luna Awards were held on February 8, 2009, at the Mandarin Oriental Suites and they honored the best Filipino films of the year 2007. It was delayed from September 2008 to February 2009 because the producer, Manio Events, encountered problems with sponsor solicitation. The Academy and the Film Development Council of the Philippines ended up producing the awards night.

The nominees were announced by Jason Abalos, Leo Martinez and Candy Pangilinan on August 29, 2008, at SM Megamall Cinema. A Love Story received the most nominations with nine. Sakal, Sakali, Saklolo followed with eight.

The winners were announced beforehand on December 18, 2008. A Love Story received most of the awards with five awards, including Best Picture.

== Winners and nominees ==
Best Picture	Best Direction
A Love Story; Banal; Faces of Love; One More Chance; Sakal, Sakali, Saklolo	Maryo J. de los Reyes – A Love Story; Cesar Apolinario – Banal; Joel Lamangan – Silip; Jose Javier Reyes – Sakal, Sakali, Saklolo; Eddie Romero – Faces of Love
Best Actor	Best Actress
Paolo Contis – Banal; John Lloyd Cruz – One More Chance; Aga Muhlach – A Love Story; Piolo Pascual – Paano Kita Iibigin; Joel Torre – Ataul for Rent	Maricel Soriano – Bahay Kubo: A Pinoy Mano Po!; Bea Alonzo – One More Chance; Judy Ann Santos – Sakal, Sakali, Saklolo; Maricel Soriano – A Love Story; Regine Velasquez – Paano Kita Iibigin
Best Supporting Actor	Best Supporting Actress
Dante Rivero – A Love Story; Alchris Galura – Batad: Sa Paang Palay; Ronnie Lazaro – Ataul for Rent; Pen Medina – Banal; Wendell Ramos – Happy Hearts	Angelica Panganiban – A Love Story; Irma Adlawan – Ataul for Rent; Eugene Domingo – Bahay Kubo: A Pinoy Mano Po!; Eugene Domingo – Paano Kita Iibigin; Gina Pareño – Sakal, Sakali, Saklolo
Best Screenplay	Best Cinematography
Vanessa Valdez – A Love Story; Vic Acedillo, Jr. – Batad: Sa Paang Palay; Carmi Raymundo & Vanessa Valdez – One More Chance; Murphy Redd & Bong Ramos – Haw-Ang (Before Harvest); Eddie Romero & Rica Arevalo – Faces of Love	Renato de Vera – Ataul for Rent; Rodolfo Aves, Jr. – Sakal, Sakali, Saklolo; Marissa Floirendo – The Promise; Ramoncito Redoble – Batanes; Manuel Teehankee – One More Chance
Best Production Design	Best Editing
Rodell Cruz – Resiklo; Blanca Dadivas & Felisberto Besina – Haw-Ang (Before Harvest); Cyrus Khan – Batanes; Mitoy Sta. Ana – Enteng Kabisote 4: Okay Ka Fairy Ko... The Beginning of the Legend; Ma. Asuncion Torres & Anna Carmela Manda – Ang Lalake sa Parola	Jess Navarro – Silip; Vito Cajili – Sakal, Sakali, Saklolo; Marya Ignacio – Ouija; Marya Ignacio – You Got Me!; Tara Illenberger – A Love Story
Best Musical Score	Best Sound
Carmina Cuya – Ouija; John Ballesteros – Faces of Love; Von de Guzman – Bahay Kubo: A Pinoy Mano Po!; Allan Feliciano & Arnold Buena – Resiklo; Jesse Lucas – Sakal, Sakali, Saklolo	Ditoy Aguila – Ouija; Ditoy Aguila & Junel Valencia – Resiklo; Ditoy Aguila & Junel Valencia – The Promise; Albert Michael Idioma – A Love Story; Albert Michael Idioma – Sakal, Sakali, Saklolo; Addiss Tabong – Katas ng Saudi

=== Special awards ===
Golden Reel Award	Fernando Poe, Jr. Lifetime Achievement Award
Joseph Estrada	Boots Anson-Roa
Manuel de Leon Award for Exemplary Achievements	Lamberto Avellana Memorial Award
Cirio Santiago	Juanito Clemente

== Multiple nominations and awards ==
Nominations	Film
9	A Love Story
8	Sakal, Sakali, Saklolo
5	One More Chance
4	Ataul for Rent
4	Banal
4	Faces of Love
3	Bahay Kubo: A Pinoy Mano Po!
3	Ouija
3	Paano Kita Iibigin
3	Resiklo
2	Batad: Sa Paang Palay
2	Batanes
2	Haw-Ang (Before Harvest)
2	Silip
2	The Promise

Awards	Film
5	A Love Story
2	Ouija
