= Bumatay =

Bumatay is a surname. Notable people with the surname include:

- Patrick J. Bumatay (born 1978), American attorney
- Sam Bumatay (born 1999), Filipino actress
