= Mulawin: The Movie =

- Theatrical release poster
- Directed by: Dominic Zapata
- Written by: Don Michael Perez
- Produced by: Jose Mari Abacan; Roselle Monteverde-Teo; Annette Gozon-Abrogar; Lily Y. Monteverde
- Starring: Richard Gutierrez; Angel Locsin
- Cinematography: Richard Padernal
- Edited by: Manet A. Dayrit
- Music by: Lutgardo Labad
- Production companies: Regal Films; GMA Films
- Distributed by: GMA Films
- Release date: December 25, 2005
- Running time: 113 minutes
- Country: Philippines
- Language: Filipino
- Box office: ₱60−62 million

Mulawin: The Movie is a 2005 Filipino fantasy adventure film directed by Dominic Zapata. A sequel to the television fantasy series Mulawin, the film stars Richard Gutierrez and Angel Locsin, reprising their respective roles. It was one of the entries in the 31st Metro Manila Film Festival.

== Synopsis ==
Aguiluz and Alwina's plan for a peaceful life as mortals unravels when their boat to Tierra Fuego (the realm of man) is caught in a violent storm. They wash up on separate shores, a young man and woman living without memories and living separate lives. Aguiluz is adopted by a humble farmer and Alwina becomes the surrogate daughter of a wealthy family and is engaged to be married to Gabriel.

But a new period in the Mulawin saga unfolds as "Keeper of the Jewel of Fire", Sang'gre Pirena uses the gintong binhi to bring Ravenum back to life. Ravenum summons the dragon Buwarka and raises an army of Ravenas to wreak havoc on Avila, which barely survives the initial attack. With the power of Mulawin’s Tree of Life dwindling down and the Mulawin race in peril, the Diwatas and the Tres Aves (a legendary trio of heroes with special abilities) rush to aid the Mulawin. But ultimately, the fate of Avila and the Mulawin race now hinges on the valor of two of its two greatest champions, Aguiluz and Alwina. The Tres Aves faces the dragon "Buwarka", The Mulawins and the Encantadia's Lireo soldiers led by Ybbarro/Ybrahim faces the Ravenas and Aguiluz and Alwina faces Ravenum. The fight continues as Aguiluz and Alwina goes inside Halconia. There they find Dakila and continues their journey. They continue a violent fight with the Ravenas and as they reach Ravenum, Aguiluz's mother (transformed from death) shows up with her husband, Ravenum. Ravenum then forces Aguiluz to transform into a Ravena and complete the family or else he will kill Alwina. Aguiluz agreed, to save the life of Alwina and their child. The Ravenas took away Alwina and Dakila, planning on beheading them. Aguiluz's body was too holy for the darkness because he was blessed and once again turns into a Mulawin. Dakila dies in the hands of the Ravenas and Alwina graciously cries. She returns to Aguiluz but their ugatpak's powers only works for nights. Aguiluz is stabbed by a sword behind. They make a way out of the hideout and at the end, killing Ravenum and comes also the death of Aguiluz. They return to Avila after a victory and a deadly battle. Aguiluz is seen lying in a royal bed in the kingdom of Lireo in Encantadia with Queen Amihan of Lireo putting the gintong binhi to his mouth that can get his life back. Alwina is then seen putting Dakila's ugatpak in the Mulawin's Tree of Life. The last part is Alwina and her son, Almiro flying together with Aguiluz behind them.

== Cast and characters ==
- Richard Gutierrez as Aguiluz / Daniel
- Angel Locsin as Alwina
- Dennis Trillo as Gabriel
- Michael de Mesa as Haring Ravenum
- Eddie Gutierrez as Pinunong Dakila
- Carmina Villarroel as Salimbay
- Zoren Legaspi as Bagwis
- Bianca King as Aviona
- Miguel Tanfelix as Young Pagaspas
- Sam Bumatay as Young Lawiswis
- Jay Aquitania as Mulagat
- Sunshine Dizon as Sang'gre Pirena of Hathoria
- Iza Calzado as Hara Amihan of Lireo
- Karylle as Sang'gre Alena of Lireo
- Valerie Concepcion as Sang'gre Danaya of Lireo
- Dingdong Dantes as Rehav Ybrahim of Sapiro
- Amy Austria as Lourdes
- Nicole Andersson as Langay
- Paolo Contis as Banoy
- Boy2 Quizon as Palong
- Arthur Solinap as Mashna Muros
- Dion Ignacio as Tayog

Since the movie is a sequel, major characters such as Veronica (played by Ara Mina) and Rasmus (played by Gary Estrada) who died in the TV series were not included in the movie version. New characters not in the TV series were also introduced in the movie. Regarding the Encantadia cast, it is said that Robbie Tan of Seiko Films did not allow his contract stars Diana Zubiri (Encantadia's Danaya) and Alfred Vargas (Encantadia's Aquil) to appear in the movie and because of this, Valerie Concepcion played the role of Danaya in the film while Aquil's character was not included.

== Production ==
GMA Films hired international action choreographer Wong Wai Fai and other Hong Kong martial arts experts to make the stunts more realistic, the same team hired for the 2005's fantasy-action TV series Sugo. Wong choreographed stunts in the highly successful foreign films such as Crouching Tiger, Hidden Dragon, Kung Fu Hustle, Rush Hour 2 and Bulletproof Monk.

== Critical reception ==
The Cinema Evaluation Board of the Philippines gave the movie the high A Rating, making it the only entry of the MMFF to receive such rating.

Mulawin the Movie is one of three fantasy films entered into the Metro Manila Film Festival (MMFF).

Mulawin: The Movie despite being a graded A film did not win any award in the concluded Metro Manila Film Festival 2005 Awards Night.

== See also ==
- Mulawin
- Encantadia
- Etheria
- Mulawin vs. Ravena
