= AJ Perez =

Filipino actor (1993–2011)

- Born: Antonello Joseph Sarte Perez; February 17, 1993; Manila, Philippines
- Died: April 17, 2011 (aged 18); Moncada, Tarlac, Philippines
- Resting place: Manila Memorial Park – Sucat
- Occupation: Actor
- Years active: 2005–2011

Antonello Joseph Sarte Perez (Tagalog pronunciation: [ˈpɛrɛs]; February 17, 1993 – April 17, 2011) was a Filipino actor. He was a member of ABS-CBN's Star Magic in Batch 13. He portrayed one of the lead characters in the 2009 miniseries Your Song Presents: Underage. In 2010, he played his first main role on primetime in the television series, Sabel.

Perez died at aged 18 in a car accident in Moncada, Tarlac, on midnight of April 17, 2011.

== Early life ==
Antonello Joseph Sarte Perez was born on February 17, 1993, to a Bacolodnon father, Gerardo "Gerry" Perez, and Bicolana mother, Maria Victoria "Marivic" (née Sarte). He had a younger brother named Angello Michael "Gello" (born May 16, 1998). He was a nephew of Albay politician Cong. Elfren Sarte. He attended high school at La Salle Greenhills in Mandaluyong, and graduated on March 20, 2011. He planned to take up Marketing at the De La Salle University because he wanted to help run the family business and he played a former college basketball team of De La Salle University.

== Career ==
=== Early career and acting ===
Perez was discovered by ABS-CBN in a TV commercial for Milo. He attended self-enhancement workshops with ABS-CBN Talent Center and was one of the new talents launched by Star Magic on its 13th anniversary in 2006.

The same year, Perez, along with the rest of Star Magic Batch 13, made a cameo appearance in the Komiks special episode Bampy. He then appeared in Star Magic Presents: All About A Girl along with Piolo Pascual and Lauren Young—his first team up with Young—they would then subsequently appear in several TV shows opposite each other. He was later cast as Josh Smith, his first regular TV appearance, in the youth-oriented TV series Star Magic Presents: Abt Ur Luv. In December 2006, he made his film debut in the award-winning Star Cinema film Kasal, Kasali, Kasalo, where he played the younger brother of Judy Ann Santos.

In 2007, Perez's Josh Smith was promoted to a lead character in Star Magic Presents: Abt Ur Luv and subsequently crossed over to Abt Ur Luv Ur Lyf 2, after the show was revamped. In the latter part of the year, he reprised his role as Otap in Sakal, Sakali, Saklolo—the sequel of Kasal, Kasali, Kasalo.

In December 2007, Perez appeared in Bahay Kubo: A Pinoy Mano Po!, an entry to the 33rd Metro Manila Film Festival. When Abt Ur Luv Lyf 2 ended its two-year run, Perez went to appear in two seasons of Star Magic Presents: Astigs—namely: Astigs in Haay...School Lyf and Astigs in Luvin Lyf. He was later cast as Bayani Mendoza in the supernatural drama Lobo. Perez made a guest appearance in the "Bato" episode of the romantic fantasy TV series Love Spell and in the Imposible episode of the musical anthology Your Song. He also joined ASAP '08 as one of the Dynamite Dance Crew and appeared in the film Magkaibigan and the direct-to-video film Kelly! Kelly! (Ang Hit na Musical).

In 2008, Robi Domingo joined Perez and the remaining members of ASAP's Dynamite Dance Crew, Chris Gutierrez, Dino Imperial, Sam Concepcion, Arron Villaflor and Enchong Dee to form ASAP's Gigger Boys. The group was later cast in the TV adaptation of the 1981 film Boystown -- Your Song Presents: Boystown. Earlier, Perez appeared in another TV adaptation -- Your Song Presents: Underage—where he played Gary, opposite of Lauren Young. He then went to appear in two Star Cinema films; BFF: Best Friends Forever and Ang Tanging Pamilya: A Marry Go Round.

Perez appeared in the romantic comedy film Babe, I Love You and, alongside Robi Domingo and Sam Concepcion, in the multi-narrative horror film Cinco in 2010. His last film appearance was in the comedy film Mamarazzi. He appeared as Jeffrey in the "Kakambal ko'y Manika" episode of Wansapanataym. In December 2010, Perez was cast in Sabel, where he played his first leading role in a teleserye with Jessy Mendiola and Joseph Marco.

His last TV appearance was in the "Tsinelas" episode of the drama anthology Maalaala Mo Kaya, which he finished filming before his death. He played Edgar, the older of the two orphaned boys who walked from Quezon City to Samar to search for their relatives. The episode also starred Bugoy Cariño. It aired posthumously on April 30, 2011 and earned Perez a posthumous nomination in the 2011 Golden Screen TV Awards for an Outstanding Performance by an Actor in a Single Drama/Telemovie Program.

Perez had earlier appeared as a guest judge in Showtime. Before the accident, Perez was in talks to appear in the Philippine remake of María la del Barrio and was also set to play a lead role in Way Back Home, the film debut of Kathryn Bernardo and Julia Montes.

== Death and funeral ==
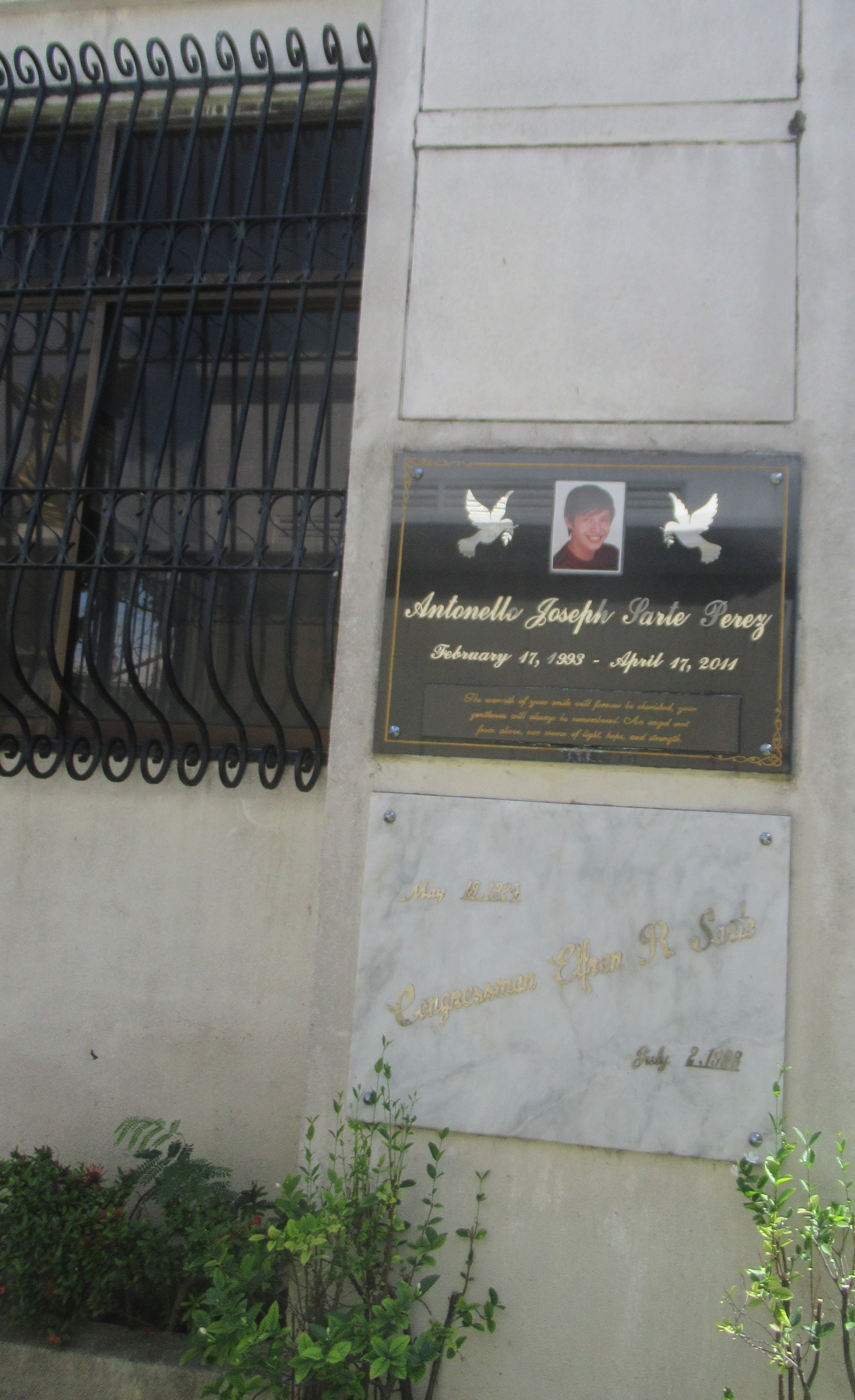
Perez's tomb at the Sarte-Perez Mausoleum, Manila Memorial Park – Sucat, Parañaque

On April 17, 2011, Perez had just finished a show in Dagupan, Pangasinan, and was riding an ABS-CBN service van on his way home with his father Gerardo, and four others. The driver of the van tried to overtake a trailer truck but collided with a Partas provincial passenger bus along MacArthur Highway in Barangay San Julian, Moncada, Tarlac. He was declared dead on arrival at the Rayos-Valentin Hospital in Paniqui, Tarlac at 12:10 a.m. Initial reports said that the cause of his death was "multiple head injuries". An autopsy concluded that Perez died after his broken ribs pierced his heart and lungs.

Perez's funeral was held at the Chapel of the Divine Child at La Salle Green Hills on April 17–18 before he was transferred in the Christ the King Parish Greenmeadows in Quezon City on April 19–26, 2011. President Benigno Aquino III paid his respects on the final night of Perez's wake.

Perez was buried at the Manila Memorial Park in Parañaque on April 26, 2011. His favorite blanket, a pair of rubber shoes, and a watch he gave his younger brother were reportedly placed inside the casket.

ABS-CBN filed a case of reckless imprudence on the driver of the van that carried Perez and four others. The driver was an employee of Southbend Express Services, Inc., a service contractor of ABS-CBN.

Perez's family wanted to donate his corneas to blind singer Fatima Soriano after his mother saw her interview with Boy Abunda on The Bottomline with Boy Abunda. However, Soriano's doctor explained this was not possible because Soriano's problem was her retinas, and only corneas can be transplanted. Perez's corneas were eventually donated to a 28-year-old man and an 8-year-old boy.

In August 2011, the Eye Bank Foundation of the Philippines posthumously honored Perez as the foundation's poster boy. The event was attended by the Perez family and the recipients of the actor's corneas.

== Filmography ==
=== Film ===
Year	Title	Role	Notes	Source
2006	Kasal, Kasali, Kasalo	Otap		
2007	Sakal, Sakali, Saklolo	Otap		
2007	Bahay Kubo: A Pinoy Mano Po!	Daniel		
2008	Magkaibigan	Joni		
2009	BFF (Best Friends Forever)	Miguel		
2009	Ang Tanging Pamilya: A Marry Go Round	Ernie		
2010	Babe, I Love You	Gian		
2010	Cinco	Andrew	Episode: "Braso"	
2010	Mamarazzi	Dingdong	Last film appearance	

=== Television ===
Year	Title	Role	Notes	Source
2006	Komiks Presents: Bampy	Boyet Olayta	Episode: "Bampy 1&2"	
2006	Star Magic Presents: All About A Girl	Egay		
2006–07	Star Magic Presents: Abt Ur Luv	Josh Smith		
2007–08	Star Magic Presents: Abt Ur Luv, Ur Lyf 2	Josh Smith		
2007–11	ASAP	Himself / Host / Performer	Segments: "Gigger Boys", "Dynamite Dance Crew"	
2008	Star Magic Presents: Astigs in Haay...School Lyf	Tyler		
2008	Star Magic Presents: Astigs in Luvin' Lyf	Wave		
2008	Kelly! Kelly! (Ang Hit na Musical)	Wesley	TV movie	
2008	Maalaala Mo Kaya	Harold	Episode: "Dalandan"	
2008	Lobo	Bayani "Yani" Mendoza		
2008	Love Spell Presents: Bato	Rico	Episode: "Bato"	
2008	Iisa Pa Lamang	Young Rafael Torralba		
2008	Your Song Presents: Impossible	Vince		
2009	Your Song Presents: Underage	Gary		
2009	Your Song Presents: Boystown	Ricky		
2009	Maynila	Billy	Episode: "Picture Perfect"	
2009	Maynila	Andy	Episode: "Chances at Love"	
2009	Midnight DJ	Baste	Episode: "Lingkis ng Taong Ahas"	
2010	Wansapanataym	Jeffrey	Episode: "Kakambal Ko'y Manika"	
2010–11	Sabel	Candido "Dido" De Dios		
2011	Showtime	Himself / Guest Judge	Special Guest Judge	
2011	Maalaala Mo Kaya	Edgar	Episode: "Tsinelas" Last TV appearance	

== Awards and nominations ==
Year	Work	Award	Category	Result	Source
2011	Maalaala Mo Kaya: "Tsinelas"	Golden Screen TV Awards	Outstanding Performance by an Actor in a Single Drama/Telemovie Program	Nominated	
