= StarStruck Kids =

Season of a Philippine television reality show

- Title card 2004
- Country of origin: Philippines
- No. of episodes: 72

Original release
- Network: GMA Network
- Release: March 20 – June 26, 2004

StarStruck Kids is the junior season of StarStruck, is a 2004 Philippine television reality talent competition show, was broadcast on GMA Network. Hosted by Jolina Magdangal, the segment hosts are the 14 finalists of StarStruck season 1: Mark Herras, Jennylyn Mercado, Rainier Castillo, Yasmien Kurdi, Nadine Samonte, Dion Ignacio, Christian Esteban, Katrina Halili, Tyron Perez, Sheena Halili, Jade Lopez, Anton dela Paz, Cristine Reyes and Alvin Aragon, all of whom serve as the junior hopefuls as they go through every phase of the competition. It premiered on March 20, 2004, replacing Search for a Star. The council was composed of Christopher de Leon, Janice de Belen and Aiza Seguerra. The season ended with 72 episodes on June 26, 2004, having Kurt Perez and Sam Bumatay as the junior Ultimate Survivors.

== Overview ==
The junior spin-off season of StarStruck was first announced by the hosts Dingdong Dantes and Nancy Castiglione after the season finale. This was an offshoot of the successful senior season, also announced on GMA Network program SOP, where the hosts invited kids from 5 to 7 years old to audition for the upcoming season. Most of the auditions were held at the GMA Network's headquarters and at SM Supermalls throughout the Philippines.

The pilot episode was aired on March 20, 2004. Like the senior version, the same rules were applied in selecting the Ultimate Survivors. This junior version of StarStruck is shown only on weekdays; Mondays to Thursdays would be tests and Fridays would be the elimination night. It became an emotional journey for the kids who had to leave the show. Nonetheless, they thoroughly enjoyed the workshops. The show held its the Final Judgment on June 26, 2004, at the Aliw Theater.

== Selection process ==
In the spin-off year of the reality-talent search, out of hundreds who auditioned nationwide, only the top 100 were chosen for the first cut. From the top 100, it was trimmed down to the top 60, then to the top 30, and at last to the final 14 finalists.

The Final 14K underwent various workshops and training in order to develop their personalities, talents, and charisma. Every week, one or two hopefuls from the junior final 14 may have to say goodbye until only four remain. Those who were eliminated were dubbed as the juniors StarStruck Avengers.

The Final 4K will vie for the coveted the junior Ultimate Survivors titles, the juniors Ultimate Male Survivor and Ultimate Female Survivor, both of them would receive P1,000,000 pesos each plus an exclusive management contract from GMA Network.

The juniors Runners-up, both of them would receive P100,000 pesos each plus an exclusive management contract from the network. The juniors StarStruck Avengers (the losing contestants) also received an exclusive contract from the network.

== Hopefuls ==
When the juniors Final 14K was chosen, they are assigned to different challenges every week that will show their acting, singing, and dancing abilities. Every Friday, one is meant to leave the competition until there were just six others who are left. From juniors’ survivor six, there will be two of them who will be eliminated and after the elimination of the two; the juniors final four will be revealed.

The juniors Final 4K will be battling with each other on the Final Judgment. People will choose who they want to win the competition by online voting and text voting. 30% of the result will come from the online and text votes and the remaining 70% is from the council.

Color key:

Male contestant
Female contestant
Finalist
Runner-up
Winner

Place	Contestant	Age	Hometown	Exit	Result
1	Kurt Perez	6	Cabanatuan, Nueva Ecija	June 26, 2004	Ultimate Male Survivor
2	Sam Bumatay	5	Metro Manila	June 26, 2004	Ultimate Female Survivor
3	Miguel Tanfelix	5	Dasmariñas, Cavite	June 26, 2004	First Prince
4	Ella Guevara	5	Quezon City	June 26, 2004	First Princess
5	JM Reyes	5	Valenzuela	June 4, 2004	Avenger
6	Bea Binene	6	Quezon City	June 4, 2004	Avenger
7	Gabriel Roxas	6	Quezon City	May 21, 2004	Avenger
8	Sandy Talag	6	Baguio, Benguet	May 14, 2004	Avenger
9	Shamel Leask	6	Antipolo, Rizal	May 7, 2004	Avenger
10	Paul Salas	5	Quezon City	April 30, 2004	Avenger
11	Uno Guerta	6	Metro Manila	April 23, 2004	Avenger
12	Serge Septimo	7	Dasmariñas, Cavite	April 16, 2004	Avenger
13	Renz Juan	6	Quezon City	April 9, 2004	Avenger
14	Madi Yu	5	Metro Manila	April 2, 2004	Avenger

== Weekly Artista Tests ==
Color key:

Contestant with the Challenge Winner
Contestant was saved by the Public Vote and Council Vote
Contestant was in the Bottom Group
Contestant was Eliminated
Contestant was in the Final 4K
Contestant was advanced to the Grand Finals
Contestant was the Runner-up
Contestant was the Winner

Week 1: The official Final 14K hopefuls have been chosen.

  - Challenge Winner Contestant: (Searching the Information)
  - Bottom Group Contestant: (Searching the Information)

Contestant	Result
Uno Guerta	Safe
Kurt Perez	Safe
JM Reyes	Safe
Gabriel Roxas	Safe
Paul Salas	Safe
Serge Septimo	Safe
Miguel Tanfelix	Safe

Contestant	Result
Bea Binene	Safe
Sam Bumatay	Safe
Ella Guevara	Safe
Renz Juan	Safe
Shamel Leask	Safe
Sandy Talag	Safe
Madi Yu	Eliminated

Week 2: The Final 13K hopefuls.

  - Challenge Winner Contestant: (Searching the Information)
  - Bottom Group Contestant: (Searching the Information)

Contestant	Result
Uno Guerta	Safe
Kurt Perez	Safe
JM Reyes	Safe
Gabriel Roxas	Safe
Paul Salas	Safe
Serge Septimo	Safe
Miguel Tanfelix	Safe

Contestant	Result
Bea Binene	Safe
Sam Bumatay	Safe
Ella Guevara	Safe
Renz Juan	Eliminated
Shamel Leask	Safe
Sandy Talag	Safe

Week 3: The Final 12K hopefuls.

  - Challenge Winner Contestant: (Searching the Information)
  - Bottom Group Contestant: (Searching the Information)

Contestant	Result
Uno Guerta	Safe
Kurt Perez	Safe
JM Reyes	Safe
Gabriel Roxas	Safe
Paul Salas	Safe
Serge Septimo	Eliminated
Miguel Tanfelix	Safe

Contestant	Result
Bea Binene	Safe
Sam Bumatay	Safe
Ella Guevara	Safe
Shamel Leask	Safe
Sandy Talag	Safe

Week 4: The Final 11K hopefuls.

  - Challenge Winner Contestant: (Searching the Information)
  - Bottom Group Contestant: (Searching the Information)

Contestant	Result
Uno Guerta	Eliminated
Kurt Perez	Safe
JM Reyes	Safe
Gabriel Roxas	Safe
Paul Salas	Safe
Miguel Tanfelix	Safe

Contestant	Result
Bea Binene	Safe
Sam Bumatay	Safe
Ella Guevara	Safe
Shamel Leask	Safe
Sandy Talag	Safe

Week 5: The Final 10K hopefuls.

  - Challenge Winner Contestant: (Searching the Information)
  - Bottom Group Contestant: (Searching the Information)

Contestant	Result
Kurt Perez	Safe
JM Reyes	Safe
Gabriel Roxas	Safe
Paul Salas	Eliminated
Miguel Tanfelix	Safe

Contestant	Result
Bea Binene	Safe
Sam Bumatay	Safe
Ella Guevara	Safe
Shamel Leask	Safe

Week 6: The Final 9K hopefuls.

  - Challenge Winner Contestant: (Searching the Information)
  - Bottom Group Contestant: (Searching the Information)

Contestant	Result
Kurt Perez	Safe
JM Reyes	Safe
Gabriel Roxas	Safe
Miguel Tanfelix	Safe

Contestant	Result
Bea Binene	Safe
Sam Bumatay	Safe
Ella Guevara	Safe
Shamel Leask	Safe
Sandy Talag	Eliminated

Week 7: The Final 8K hopefuls.

  - Challenge Winner Contestant: (Searching the Information)
  - Bottom Group Contestant: (Searching the Information)

Contestant	Result
Kurt Perez	Safe
JM Reyes	Safe
Gabriel Roxas	Safe
Miguel Tanfelix	Safe

Contestant	Result
Bea Binene	Safe
Sam Bumatay	Safe
Ella Guevara	Safe
Shamel Leask	Eliminated

Week 8: The Final 7K hopefuls.

  - Challenge Winner Contestant: (Searching the Information)
  - Bottom Group Contestant: (Searching the Information)

Contestant	Result
Kurt Perez	Safe
JM Reyes	Safe
Gabriel Roxas	Eliminated
Miguel Tanfelix	Safe

Contestant	Result
Bea Binene	Safe
Sam Bumatay	Safe
Ella Guevara	Safe

Week 9: The Final 6K hopefuls.

  - Challenge Winner Contestant: (Searching the Information)
  - Bottom Group Contestant: (Searching the Information)
  - Eliminated Contestant: None

Contestant	Result
Kurt Perez	Bottom 6
JM Reyes	Bottom 6
Miguel Tanfelix	Bottom 6

Contestant	Result
Bea Binene	Bottom 6
Sam Bumatay	Bottom 6
Ella Guevara	Bottom 6

Week 10: The Survivor 6K hopefuls, The official Final 4K hopefuls have been chosen.

  - Challenge Winner Contestant: (Searching the Information)
  - Bottom Group Contestant: (Searching the Information)

Contestant	Result
Kurt Perez	Final 4K
JM Reyes	Eliminated
Miguel Tanfelix	Final 4K

Contestant	Result
Bea Binene	Eliminated
Sam Bumatay	Final 4K
Ella Guevara	Final 4K

Week 11-12: The Final 4K Homecoming

Contestant	Result
Kurt Perez	Advanced
Miguel Tanfelix	Advanced

Contestant	Result
Sam Bumatay	Advanced
Ella Guevara	Advanced

Week 13: The Final Judgment, the junior Ultimate Survivors have been proclaimed.

Contestant	Result
Kurt Perez	Ultimate Male Survivor
Miguel Tanfelix	First Prince

Contestant	Result
Sam Bumatay	Ultimate Female Survivor
Ella Guevara	First Princess

== Final Judgment ==
The winner was announced on a two-hour TV special dubbed as StarStruck Kids: The Final Judgment was held live on June 26, 2004, at the Aliw Theatre.

The opening dance number, together with this season's juniors avengers, were joined by this junior season's final four and those of the senior season's.

Announcement came, Sam Bumatay of Metro Manila was the junior Ultimate Female Survivor and Kurt Perez of Cabanatuan, Nueva Ecija was the junior Ultimate Male Survivor. The two were proclaimed as junior Ultimate Survivors and each of them received P1,000,000 pesos each plus and an exclusive management contract from GMA Network.

While, Ella Guevara of Quezon City and Miguel Tanfelix of Dasmariñas, Cavite were proclaimed as the juniors Runners-up, each of them received P100,000 pesos each plus and an exclusive management contract from the network. The juniors StarStruck Avengers (the losing contestants) also received an exclusive contract from the network.

The Final Judgment gained 35.2% in ratings. Plans for a second junior season were cancelled probably because of too much psychological pressure on children during their talent tests.

== TV Assignment ==
For their first TV Assignment, the junior final four Kurt Perez, Sam Bumatay, Miguel Tanfelix and Ella Guevara with the junior avengers Paul Salas and Shamel Leask joined the recurring cast of the telefantasya, Mulawin.

== Signature dances ==
There are signature dances and songs made in each batch. With this batch, their signature dances and songs are:

- Baby Superstar

== Elimination chart ==
Color key:

Male contestant
Female contestant
Challenge Winner
Safe
Bottom Group
Eliminated
Final 4K
Advanced
Finalist
Runner-up
Winner

Results per public and council votesChallenge Winner Contestant (searching the real information)Bottom Group Contestant (searching the real information)
Place	Contestant	Top 14 (Week 1)	Top 13 (Week 2)	Top 12 (Week 3)	Top 11 (Week 4)	Top 10 (Week 5)	Top 9 (Week 6)	Top 8 (Week 7)	Top 7 (Week 8)	Top 6 (Week 9–10)		Top 4 (Week 11–13)		
Place	Contestant	4/2/04	4/9/04	4/16/04	4/23/04	4/30/04	5/7/04	5/14/04	5/21/04	5/28/04 ^{1}	6/4/04 ^{2}	6/11/04	6/18/04	6/26/04 ^{3}
1–4	Kurt Perez	Safe	Safe	Safe	Safe	Safe	Safe	Safe	Safe	Bottom 6	Final 4K	Advanced	Advanced	Ultimate Male Survivor
1–4	Sam Bumatay	Safe	Safe	Safe	Safe	Safe	Safe	Safe	Safe	Bottom 6	Final 4K	Advanced	Advanced	Ultimate Female Survivor
1–4	Miguel Tanfelix	Safe	Safe	Safe	Safe	Safe	Safe	Safe	Safe	Bottom 6	Final 4K	Advanced	Advanced	First Prince
1–4	Ella Guevara	Safe	Safe	Safe	Safe	Safe	Safe	Safe	Safe	Bottom 6	Final 4K	Advanced	Advanced	First Princess
5–6	JM Reyes	Safe	Safe	Safe	Safe	Safe	Safe	Safe	Safe	Bottom 6	Eliminated			Avenger
5–6	Bea Binene	Safe	Safe	Safe	Safe	Safe	Safe	Safe	Safe	Bottom 6	Eliminated			Avenger
7	Gabriel Roxas	Safe	Safe	Safe	Safe	Safe	Safe	Safe	Eliminated					Avenger
8	Shamel Leask	Safe	Safe	Safe	Safe	Safe	Safe	Eliminated						Avenger
9	Sandy Talag	Safe	Safe	Safe	Safe	Safe	Eliminated							Avenger
10	Paul Salas	Safe	Safe	Safe	Safe	Eliminated								Avenger
11	Uno Guerta	Safe	Safe	Safe	Eliminated									Avenger
12	Serge Septimo	Safe	Safe	Eliminated										Avenger
13	Renz Juan	Safe	Eliminated											Avenger
14	Madi Yu	Eliminated												Avenger

Notes

1. It was a non-elimination week. The following week the two contestants were eliminated.
2. The first one to be eliminated was Bea Binene and the second was JM Reyes.
3. In the final judgment night, Kurt Perez and Sam Bumatay were proclaimed as the junior Ultimate Survivors.
