= Banal (2008 film) =

- Directed by: Cesar Apolinario
- Screenplay by: Cris Lim
- Produced by: Ina Alegre
- Production company: Comguild Production
- Release date: January 1, 2008
- Country: Philippines
- Language: Filipino

Banal (transl. Holy) is a 2008 Philippine action thriller film directed by Cesar Apolinario.

== Plot ==
Cris and Jason are two cadet policemen who have opposing views politically and life in general. However, this did not stop them from forming a bond during their training supervised by Major Miguel Sagala. Soon after, their brotherhood is put to the test when one of them engages in a terrorist plot.

== Cast ==
- Christopher De Leon as Major Miguel Sagala
- Paolo Contis as Cristobal "Cris" Marcelo
- Alfred Vargas as Jason Marcelo
- Paolo Paraiso as Renate "Bade" Badenas Jr.
- Cassandra Ponti as Melody Marcelo
- Ina Alegre as Madre
- Pen Medina as Manalo
- Pepe Smith as Oplan

== Production ==
Banal is a work under Comguild Production Co. with Cesar Apolinario as its director and Ina Alegre as its producer. Banal was produced as a digital film. This film marks the directorial debut for Apolinario who is better known for being a news reporter for GMA News and Public Affairs.

The film's script was made by Cris Lim deriving from an original story by Mac Cruz. Banal was inspired from the Bojinka plot of 1995, specifically the plan to assassinate Pope John Paul II. In the film, the friendship of the two police protagonists were put to the test during the papal visit. The film was originally meant to be produced as an independent film.

Filming for Banal took 12 days. The production team worked with members of the Special Weapons And Tactics (SWAT) of the Philippine National Police with the cast members undergoing training the actual police unit undergoes.

== Release ==
Banal is among the official entries of the 2007 Metro Manila Film Festival which began on December 25, 2007. However, Banal itself premiered in cinemas in the Philippines on January 1, 2008. It was only entry to be a digital film.

The Movie and Television Review and Classification Board initially gave Banal an X-rating, which effectively banned it from public screening over its perceived "anti-Church" themes. On second review, the film would be given an R-13 rating by a committee which include Catholic priest Nico Cruz who concluded that the film did not have such kind of theme.
