= Kurt Perez =

Filipino actor

- Born: Kurt Isaiah Marcelo Perez; December 1, 1997 (age 28); Cabanatuan, Nueva Ecija, Philippines
- Other names: Kurt Perez
- Years active: 2003–2006
- Agent: GMA Artist Center (2004–2006)

Kurt Isaiah Perez (born 1 December 1997) is a Filipino former child actor. He became famous for being the Ultimate Male Survivor of StarStruck Kids, the reality-based talent search show of GMA in the Philippines.

== Personal life ==
Kurt Isaiah Perez was born on 1 December 1997, in Cabanatuan, Nueva Ecija, Philippines. He is the youngest of the three children of Arlene Marcelo and Erwin Perez. He studied in Angelicum College.

Perez together with his family migrated to Brisbane, Australia and studied accounting and currently finishing his master's degree in data science.

== Career ==
In 2003, Perez did commercials with Sharon Cuneta for Colgate toothpaste and Ai-Ai delas Alas for Swift Sweet n' Juicy Hotdog. He joined the contest in StarStruck Kids (2004) with 14 finalists. He won as the Ultimate Male Survivor while Sam Bumatay won as Ultimate Female Survivor.

He played as the young Aguiluz in Mulawin TV series, older Aguiluz played by Richard Gutierrez, also stars Angel Locsin and Dennis Trillo, among others. In 2006, Perez was nominated as FAMAS Best Child Actor for the movie La Visa Loca starring Robin Padilla and Rufa Mae Quinto.

== Filmography ==
Year	Title	Role
2004	StarStruck Kids	Himself/Contestant
2004	Mulawin	Young Aguiluz
2004	Eat Bulaga!	Himself/Performer
2006	Noel	Carl
2006	Maynila	Young Nathan
2006	Maynila	Young Adrian
