= Paul Salas =

Filipino actor and model (born 1998)

- Born: Paul Andre Solinap Salas; April 16, 1998 (age 28); Quezon City, Philippines
- Education: Starland International School
- Occupations: Actor; model; vlogger
- Years active: 2004–present
- Agents: Sparkle (2004–2007; 2018–present); Star Magic (2008–2018); PPL Entertainment (2018–present)
- Height: 1.79 m (5 ft 10 in)
- Partner: Mikee Quintos (2021-2025)
- Relatives: Enrique Gil (cousin); Dingdong Dantes (uncle); Arthur Solinap (uncle); Michelle Solinap (mother)

Paul Andre Solinap Salas (born April 16, 1998), popularly known by his stage name Paul Salas and also known as Paul Swaggy, is a Filipino actor, model, vlogger and recording artist.

== Early life ==
He is the eldest son of Michelle Solinap and Universal Motion dancer Jim Salas. He graduated from Starland International School in 2015.

== Career ==
He also appeared in stage plays Lilo & Stitch and Sesame Street.

He started his career in 2004 through GMA Network's talent search StarStruck Kids, alongside Miguel Tanfelix, Sandy Talag, Bea Binene and among others. He starred in some GMA shows such as Mulawin.

In 2008, he transferred to ABS-CBN and cast to play Uragon in a live action fantasy series Kung Fu Kids. Following this, he appeared in as a young version of the main casts of various television series.

After almost 9 years of staying ABS-CBN, Salas returned to GMA Network in March 2018. He then signed a contract with GMA Artist Center on May 17, 2018.

In July 2025, Salas released his first single under the stage name, Paul Swaggy.

== Filmography ==
=== Film ===
| Year | Title | Role |
|---|---|---|
| 2004 | Forever My Love | Ricky |
| 2005 | Shake, Rattle & Roll 2k5 | Paul |
| 2006 | Enteng Kabisote 3: Okay Ka, Fairy Ko: The Legend Goes On and On and On | Himself |
| 2006 | Matakot Ka Sa Karma | Jake |
| 2007 | My Kuya's Wedding | Young Jeff |
| 2007 | Pasukob | Gaspar Jr. |
| 2011 | In the Name of Love | Migo |
| 2011 | Wedding Tayo, Wedding Hindi | Jay-Z Bautista |
| 2013 | Must Be... Love | Jake |
| 2015 | Everyday I Love You | teenage Tristan |
| 2017 | Dear Other Self | Pepe Macadaeg |
| 2023 | Shake, Rattle & Roll Extreme | Robin |

=== Television ===
| Year | Title | Role | Ref. |
|---|---|---|---|
| 2004 | Starstruck Kids | Himself | |
| 2005 | Mulawin | Young Gabriel | |
| 2005 | Encantadia | Young Kahlil | |
| 2006 | Eat Bulaga's Lenten Special: Ganyan Kita Kamahal | Young Lito | |
| 2006 | Majika | Cocoy | |
| 2006 | Atlantika | Young Piranus | |
| 2007 | Mga Kuwento ni Lola Basyang | Efren | |
| 2007 | Asian Treasures | Young Hector | |
| 2008 | Kung Fu Kids | Leonardo "Uragon" De Vela/Kid Leader | |
| 2008 | Dyosa | Young Kulas | |
| 2008 | Komiks Presents: Varga | Brian | |
| 2008 | Carlo J. Caparas' Pieta | Young Rigor | |
| 2009 | Tayong Dalawa | Young Ramon | |
| 2009 | Jim Fernandez's Kambal Sa Uma | Young Dino | |
| 2009 | Dahil May Isang Ikaw | Young Miguel | |
| 2009 | Precious Hearts Romances Presents: My Cheating Heart | Young Mio | |
| 2009 | Moomoo & Me | Pogs | |
| 2010 | Kung Tayo'y Magkakalayo | Young Frank | |
| 2010 | Habang May Buhay | Young Nathan | |
| 2010 | Maalaala Mo Kaya: Camera | Maco | |
| 2010 | Shout Out! | Himself | |
| 2011 | Mula sa Puso | Warren Maglayon | |
| 2011 | Maalaala Mo Kaya: Tungkod | Juvil | |
| 2011 | Wansapanataym: Mac Ulit-Ulit | Janel | |
| 2011–2018 | ASAP | Himself Performer | |
| 2011–2013 | Toda Max | Jonas | |
| 2012 | Oka2kat | Andrew | |
| 2012 | Maalaala Mo Kaya: Panyo | Nico | |
| 2012 | Kung Ako'y Iiwan Mo | Young Paul | |
| 2012 | Aryana | Marlon Salvador | |
| 2013 | Maalaala Mo Kaya: Alitaptap | Raymond | |
| 2014 | Maalaala Mo Kaya: Santan | Alvin | |
| 2014 | Wansapanataym: Si Lulu At Si Lily Liit | Dondi | |
| 2014 | Maalaala Mo Kaya: Sanggol | Leo | |
| 2014 | Luv U | Thirdy Villarama | |
| 2014 | Maalaala Mo Kaya: Selfie | Kenneth | |
| 2015 | Maalaala Mo Kaya: Barko | Mark Anthony Capulong | |
| 2015 | You're My Home | Vince Fontanilla / Kennedy "Ken" Cabanero | |
| 2016 | We Will Survive | Young Arnold | |
| 2017 | Wattpad Presents: Accidentally in Love with a Gangster | Kurt | |
| 2017 | The Source | Himself / Guest | |
| 2017 | Maalaala Mo Kaya: Jumper | Koykoy | |
| 2017 | The Good Son | Dmitri "Trey" Gamboa | |
| 2018 | Sunday PinaSaya | Himself / Guest | |
| 2018 | Mars | Himself / Guest | |
| 2018 | Maynila: Tatlo Kumplikado | Sonny | |
| 2018 | Magpakailanman: Yuki: A Japinay Story | Derick | |
| 2018 | Stories for the Soul: Ang Proyekto | Japeth | |
| 2018 | Tadhana: Pag-uwi | Jeffrey | |
| 2018 | Wish Ko Lang!: Alang-alang sa Pamilya | Guest | |
| 2018–2019 | Studio 7 | Himself / co-host / Performer ? Guest | |
| 2019 | Kara Mia | Chino Burgos | |
| 2019 | Eat Bulaga: BEBOT | Lisa Mauban | |
| 2020–present | All-Out Sundays | Himself / Performer | |
| 2020 | Descendants of the Sun | Marty Tañedo | |
| 2021 | Dear Uge Presents: Jing, ang Bato | PJ Abril | |
| 2021 | The Lost Recipe | Frank Vergara | |
| 2022 | Lolong | Martin Banson | |
| 2022 | Mano Po Legacy: The Flower Sisters | Leopoldo Chua (young) | |
| 2023 | The Write One | Hans Arevalo | |
| 2024–2025 | Shining Inheritance | Francis Abrigo | |
| 2024–present | It's Showtime | Himself / Guest | |
| 2026 | Stars on the Floor | Himself / Contestant | |

== Discography ==
=== Studio albums ===
| Release date | Title | Record Company | Sales | Certification | Ref |

== Awards ==
| Year | Award-Giving Body | Category | Work | Result |
|---|---|---|---|---|
| 2006 | Metro Manila Film Festival | Best Child Performer | Shake, Rattle and Roll 2k5 | Won |
