= Alwina =

Alwina is a given name. Notable people with the given name include:

== People ==
- Alwina Gossauer (1841–1926), Swiss women professional photographer and businesswoman from Rapperswil
- Alwina Valleria (1848–1925), American-born soprano

== Fiction ==
- Alwina, a lead character in the Mulawin series played by Angel Locsin.
