= Mamarazzi =

- Directed by: Joel C. Lamangan
- Screenplay by: Ricky Lee; Chris Violago
- Story by: Joel C. Lamangan; Ricky Lee
- Produced by: Lily Y. Monteverde
- Starring: Eugene Domingo; John Lapus; Diether Ocampo; AJ Perez; Carla Abellana; Andi Eigenmann
- Cinematography: Mo Zee
- Edited by: Tara Illenberger
- Music by: Diwa de Leon
- Production companies: Regal Films; Regal Multimedia Inc.
- Distributed by: Regal Films
- Release date: August 25, 2010
- Running time: 105 minutes
- Country: Philippines
- Language: Filipino
- Box office: ₱21,725,740.00 (US$517,280.00)

Mamarazzi is a 2010 Filipino comedy film starring Eugene Domingo. It is Regal Films' first offering for its 50th anniversary.

This is also the last film appearance of actor AJ Perez, who died in a vehicular accident in Moncada, Tarlac on April 17, 2011, aged 18.

== Plot ==
Mamarazzi is the story of a mother who constantly pries into the lives of her three children, often resulting in riotous and hilarious situations.

Fifteen years ago, Violy Langit (Domingo), a small funeral parlor owner, learned she needed a hysterectomy. Having always wanted children, she decided to have one before the procedure. Without a man in her life, she turned to her best friend, Mandy (Lapus), who out of pity and love, offered his boyfriend Carlo (Ocampo) as a sperm donor.

With Mandy's blessing, Violy and Carlo share a night of romance, passion, and mystery. However, Carlo disappears from Violy and Mandy's lives afterward. It is later revealed that Carlo tried to steal Violy's money.

Violy fulfills her wish and is blessed with two girls, Peachy and Strawberry (Eigenmann), and a boy, Dingdong (Perez). She raises them as a single mother.

As Violy's children grow older, she does everything she can to ensure their happiness, even helping her son pursue Mimi (Abellana), whom he likes. Her controlling and nosy behavior makes her kids question her intentions, unaware that she only wants to make them happy. They also press her to reveal their father's identity, eventually learning he was a bartender Violy met while drunk. The money he failed to steal from Violy funded his move to Dubai, where he worked in a café and met an Arab woman (Domingo), an executive vice president who resembled Violy. They married, but she died during their honeymoon, leaving him her inheritance.

As tensions run high and emotions soar, the story unfolds with a series of shocking, funny, and quirky revelations. Violy and Carlo eventually marry, bringing a second dad into their children's lives and forever changing everyone's fate. Their commitment is symbolized by the vow: "Till death do us part."

== Cast ==
=== Main cast ===
- Eugene Domingo as Violet "Violy"/Wilhelmina/Violet's Mom/Arab Woman
- John Lapus as Mandy Gonzales
- Diether Ocampo as Carlo
- AJ Perez† as Dingdong
- Carla Abellana as Mimi Gonzales
- Andi Eigenmann as Strawberry/Peachy

=== Supporting cast ===
- Xian Lim as Oscar
- Arron Villaflor as Glen Santos-Gonzales
- Carl Guevarra as Louie
- JC Tiuseco as Ray
- Lucho Ayala as Lloyd

=== Guest cast ===
- Sam Bumatay as Young Violet
- Masaki Reyes as Young Dingdong
- Alyanna Escasa as Young Strawberry
- Alyssa Escasa as Young Peachy
- Violy Villalon as Betsay
- Ignacio Espinosa as Turing

=== Double ===
- Avigail Dreje as Strawberry/Peachy's Double
- Jovelle Salcines as Strawberry's Skater-Double
- Cristina Gomera as Violy's Double
- Jelica Trasporte as Violy's Skater-Double
- Aljohn Gonzano as Dingdong's Double
- Rex Regidor as Dingdong's Stunt-Double
