= Kamandag =

Philippine television drama series

- Title card
- Also known as: Venom
- Genre: Fantasy drama
- Based on: Kamandag by Carlo J. Caparas
- Written by: R.J. Nuevas; Suzette Doctolero; Jules Katanyag; Tina Velasco
- Directed by: Mark A. Reyes V; Topel Lee
- Starring: Richard Gutierrez
- Theme music composer: Eric Torralba
- Opening theme: "Kamandag" by First Circle
- Country of origin: Philippines
- Original language: Tagalog
- No. of episodes: 113 + 1 special

Production
- Executive producers: Carol Reyes; Angie Castrence
- Camera setup: Multiple-camera setup
- Running time: 30–45 minutes
- Production company: GMA Entertainment TV

Original release
- Network: GMA Network
- Release: November 19, 2007 – April 25, 2008

Kamandag (trans. / international title: Venom) is a Philippine television drama fantasy series broadcast by GMA Network. The series is based from the graphic novel of Carlo J. Caparas. Directed by Mark A. Reyes V and Topel Lee, it stars Richard Gutierrez in the title role. It premiered on November 19, 2007 on the network's Telebabad line up. The series concluded on April 25, 2008, with a total of 113 episodes.

== Cast and characters ==
Cast

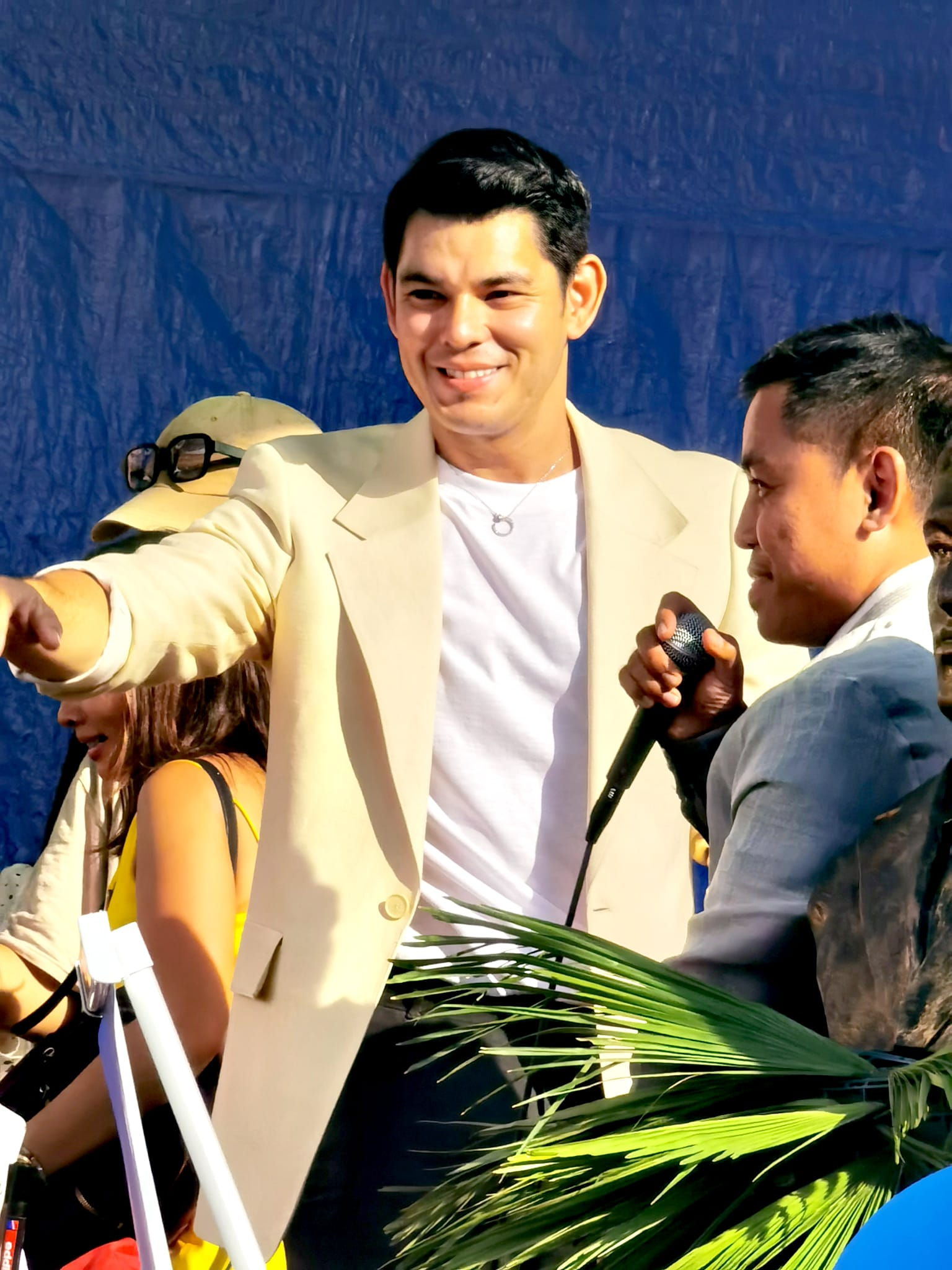
Richard Gutierrez

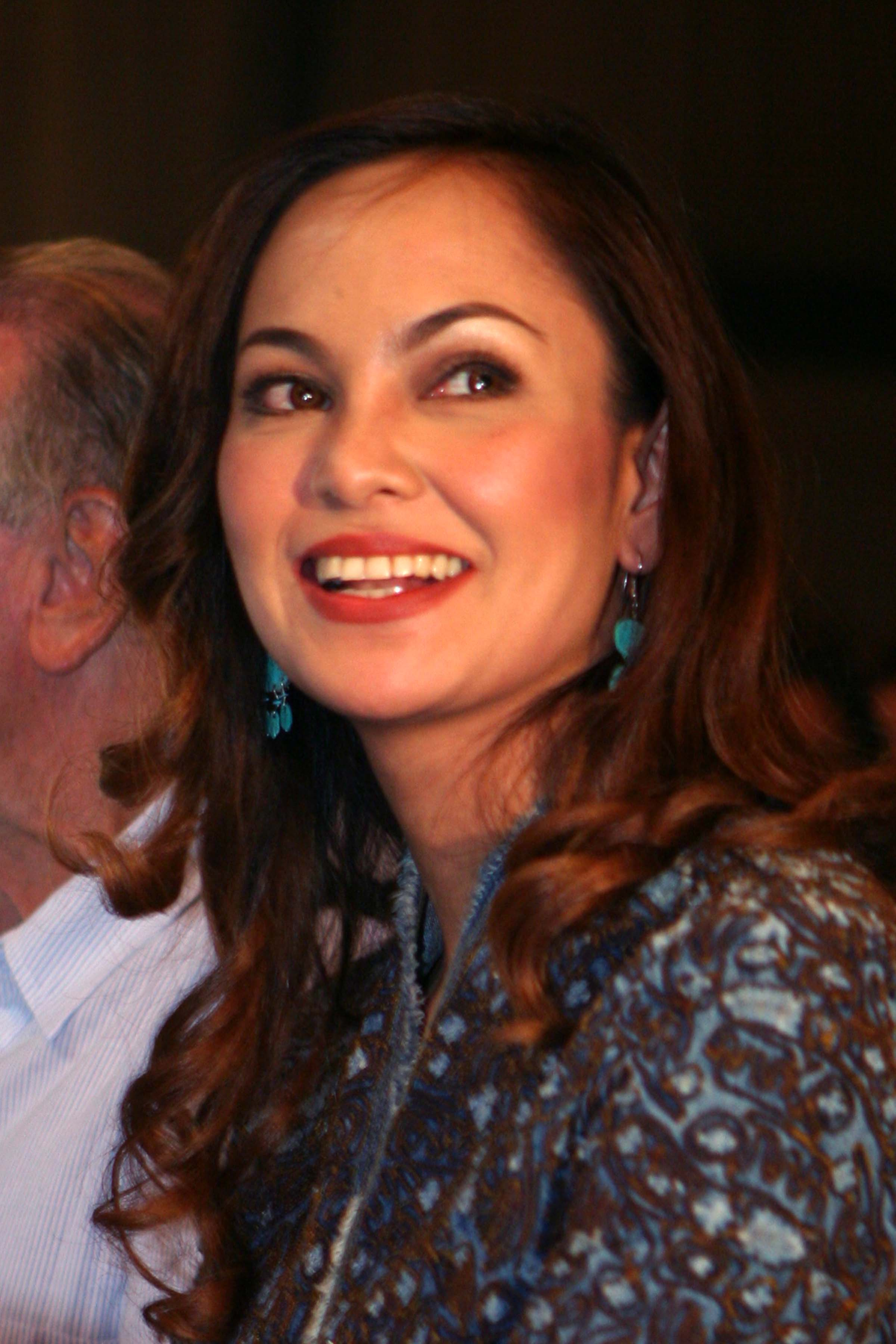
Eula Valdez

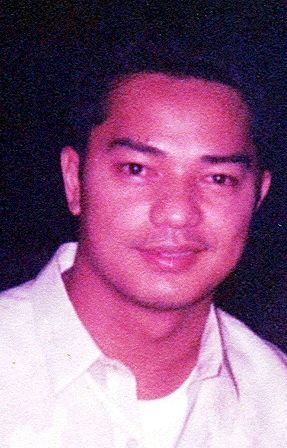
Ariel Rivera

Lead cast

- Richard Gutierrez as Vergel / Kamandag

Supporting cast

- Mark Anthony Fernandez as Lucero Serrano / Talim
- Jewel Mische as Jenny
- Maxene Magalona as Lily
- Ehra Madrigal / Anne Chennette T. Rodriguez as Ditas / Denise / Lady Kamandag
- Eula Valdez and Glaiza de Castro as Alicia
- Johnny Delgado as Budol
- Zoren Legaspi as Gulag
- Ariel Rivera as Abdon Serrano
- Ronaldo Valdez and Ramon Christopher Gutierrez (young) as Pepe
- Francine Prieto as Kuran
- Rainier Castillo as Ikoy
- Francis Magundayao as Boyong / Dagok
- Melissa Mendez as Elena
- Benjie Paras as Dinggol
- Elvis Gutierrez as Agol
- Pekto as Doro
- Gardo Versoza as Saban
- Emilio Garcia as Domeng
- Sunshine Dizon as Ragona

Guest cast

- Afi Africa as Afie
- Rhea Nakpil as Bea
- Renz Valerio as younger Vergel
- Alessandra De Rossi as Eleanor
- Glydel Mercado as Vivian
- Michelle Madrigal as Eliza
- Bryan Revilla as Adlak
- Ram Revilla as Harn
- Maureen Larrazabal as Cathy
- Michael Flores as Sahir
- Dominic Roco as Pigo
- Karylle as Spectra
- Alyssa Alano as Baba
- Ynez Veneracion as Jaimee
- Saab Magalona as Eleanor's friend
- Kevin Santos as Randy
- Anne Chennette T. Rodriguez as younger Ditas
- Sam Bumatay as younger Baya

== Production ==
Principal photography commenced in September 2007.

== Ratings ==
According to AGB Nielsen Philippines' Mega Manila household television ratings, the pilot episode of Kamandag earned a 42.7% rating. The final episode scored a 38.1% rating.
