= Sabel (TV series) =

- Title card
- Genre: Drama, Romance
- Created by: ABS-CBN Studios; Rondel P. Lindayag
- Based on: Bata Pa si Sabel (1981) by Joey Gosiengfiao
- Developed by: ABS-CBN Studios; Roldeo Endrinal; Julie Anne R. Benitez
- Directed by: Don M. Cuaresma; Francis E. Pasion
- Starring: Jessy Mendiola; AJ Perez; Joseph Marco
- Opening theme: "Hagkan" by Nina
- Country of origin: Philippines
- Original language: Filipino
- No. of episodes: 70

Production
- Executive producers: Roldeo T. Endrinal; Eileen Angela T. Garcia
- Running time: 30-45 minutes
- Production company: Dreamscape Entertainment Television

Original release
- Network: ABS-CBN
- Release: December 6, 2010 – March 11, 2011

Sabel is a Philippine television drama romance series broadcast by ABS-CBN. The series is based on the 1981 Philippine film Bata Pa si Sabel by Joey Gosiengfiao. Directed by Don M. Cuaresma and Francis E. Pasion, it stars Jessy Mendiola, AJ Perez, and Joseph Marco. It aired on the network's Primetime Bida line up and worldwide on TFC from December 6, 2010 to March 11, 2011, replacing Kokey at Ako.

== Plot ==
When Choleng falls in love with the town priest Julio, the townspeople turn on her when they find out the pair will elope, fearing Julio will abandon his priestly duties to pray for and heal the people. Little did a heavily pregnant Choleng know on the night of their escape that a storm will thwart their plan: Julio gets into an accident and dies as Sabel is born. With Julio's death, the townsfolk think Choleng's daughter is a curse as more bad things occur. She decides not to argue, and ignores the problems around her. To give Sabel a better future, she flees the village with her mother Amparo to start anew. When the three find help from dearest friends, they begin a new life in a kinder community. The sickly baby Sabel grows up, determined to fight for her family. Fearing she will know her true parentage and look for her father, Choleng does everything in her power to prevent Sabel from doing so. Choleng falls for Jimmy, who is also loved by Margaret. Choleng refuses Jimmy's sincere love and even offers marriage, accepting her past. But, Choleng and Sabel's love for Jimmy and accepting him as a father will only mean to Choleng that she does not want to lose him as for Sabel as she grows up. And even for love, there is a solace she finds this into Dido and Raymond. But time comes again when she will face the same situation as her mother and this. Is love a sin when one's feelings are true as she shows the townspeople and people around her that she is not cursed with this life and that life has no meaning without love?

== Cast and characters ==
=== Main cast ===
Artist	Character	Notes
Jessy Mendiola	as Isabel "Sabel" Asuncion-Zaragosa†	Daughter of Choleng and Julio. Margaret, Candido's mom, convinces people that she's cursed and brings forth bad luck. She is unaware of her father's true identity. She is Candido's love interest but their relationship always stir up trouble for his and her family so she ended the relationship. A few years later, she meets Eric, her new love interest and married him. She fainted in the hospital where Eric appeared in Sabel's dream before he died to tell her that she is pregnant and his last request is for Dido to protect her from harm. She has inherited all the properties and money savings that Eric saved up because she is the widow of Eric but she didn't want what she inherited. She gave all of it to his mother, Bettina. She went to prison because Margaret made it look like she was the one who stabbed Margaret with a knife. Sabel wanted to show the people of her town that she is not the type of person they think she is. Therefore, she created a foundation to help the people in need in her town. Anton and Margaret kidnapped her daughter but she got caught in the cross fire, where Anton shot her in the back because she protected Dido from being shot. Her last request is for him to go back to the church to become a priest which he did. Margaret placed Erica on the ground and ran off where Dido picked up Erica to put her beside Sabel. Sabel kissed her daughter one last time and finally told Dido she loved him, then she died.
AJ Perez†	as Candido "Dido" De Dios	a good, lovable and adopted son to Margaret. He was made to enter the seminary upon his mother's request. He was having second thoughts about becoming a priest but in the back of his mind, he thought of what might have been with Sabel. He is Sabel's good friend after he saved Sabel by almost getting drowned in the river, then became Sabel's love interest after he asked her on their prom. Few years later, he saw Sabel at the Dessert Festival, where she baked buko pie, then he saw Sabel kissing Eric, then felt heartbroken. He still have feelings for Sabel but she is now engaged and married to Eric. He has continued his quest in becoming a priest and protecting Sabel from harm - a request from Eric before he died, but he discontinued his quest in becoming a priest because he want to spend his life with Sabel, but Sabel won't accept it. After the kidnapping of Sabel's daughter, Erica, Sabel's last request was for him to go back to the church to become a priest after she got shot from Antonio. In the end, he became a full priest 6 years later was Erica is already 6 years old.
Joseph Marco	as Raymond Sandoval†	Dido's brother. His mother, Margaret, believes that he is a bad influence to Dido. He tried to avoid Kimberly and was shocked that Kimberly was pregnant with his child. His daughter and Kimberly lives with him. He has found a way to get Sabel to trust him and wants to help Sabel with the accusations against her but that has all changed in court for Sabel's court hearing. He died when he got shot by a gun from Margaret to save Sabel from being shot, his own mother and she blamed Sabel once again for shooting Raymond.

=== Supporting cast ===
Artist	Character	Notes
Rita Avila	as Margarette De Dios-Sandoval	Julio's younger sister and a lover of Jimmy Sandoval. She had an adopted son named Dido, who falls in love with Sabel. She is an authoritative parent because she pushed Dido to enter priesthood which caused Dido's loneliness. She blames Sabel for everything and persuading everyone into thinking that Sabel and her family are bad people. In her case, she is the one who is doing the evil deeds and blaming Sabel for all she's doing. She accidentally shoots Raymund with a gun, when she was about to shoot Sabel, and all of the people in Santa Elena blames her for shooting Raymund and being a true, "salot". Margaret told Antonio that she wanted to kill Sabel. In the end, she told the whole people from Santa Elena that Choleng and her family are not a pest. But then, she was sent to jail for her idea for killing Sabel.
Glydel Mercado	as Choleng Asuncion	Sabel's mother. In the past, she had affair with a priest. She had 3 relationships: with Julio, a priest, Jimmy, a lover for the longest time and Anton, a colleague. She and her daughter are despised by Margaret.

=== Recurring cast ===
Artist	Character	Notes
Diether Ocampo	as Frederico "Eric" I. Zaragosa†	He moves on with his life after Cassandra died and Sabel reminds him of her after many encounters with Sabel, he was having romantic feelings for Sabel. He was willing to wait until Sabel accepted him as her boyfriend and she agreed to become her husband. Eric was taken to the hospital because he was having a severe headache after confronting Margaret about Sabel. His mother was concerned and his condition with a brain tumor got worse which caused him to die. He appeared in Sabel's dream before he died to tell her that she is pregnant and his last request is for Dido to protect Sabel from harm.
Raymond Bagatsing	as Jimmy Sandoval	Edgardo's old personnel. Margaret secretly loved him. When Margaret knew that he loved somebody else, she pushed Jimmy to marry her. He is also the father of Raymund.
Jaclyn Jose†	as Bettina Imperial-Zaragosa	Dermatologist and helps people in need who can't afford medical treatment especially what had happened to Sabel's neck. Her friend, Margaret, has persuaded her into thinking that Sabel and her family are a pest. She started to hate Sabel after the fire and not knowingly that Margaret hired Antonio as the arsonist to set fire to her home. She had spoken to Dido and Jimmy and she is aware of what type of person Sabel is which is she isn't a greedy person when Sabel gave all her inheritance to Bettina. Dido and Jimmy got her to understand that led her to believe that Sabel is not a bad person and she will help free Sabel from imprisonment.
Ron Morales	as Antonio Amorado	Sabel's stepfather and Choleng's new husband. He tried to rape Sabel and forced Margaret for money. Because Margaret pays plenty of money to Antonio, that is why he became very bad. Margaret killed him by setting his house on fire when she confronted him about taking her father's gun from her house. Antonio apparently survived and Margaret was shocked that he was still alive. Margaret told Antonio to kill Sabel however of course not to kill Sabel because he need a money then he plan to kidnap the daughter of Sabel for ransom then he told and reiterates that Margaret should kidnap the daughter of Sabel. He wants to kill Dido however Sabel protected Dido from being shot. Margaret tell him about why did he to kill Dido however he do not want interfere because he want to be dictated than Margaret, then he died when he got shot by a gun from Dido.
Tommy Abuel	as Edgardo de Dios†	Margaret's father and Sabel's grandfather, Dido and Raymond's grandfather. He had followed anything Margaret wanted. He also blackmailed Jimmy to marry Margaret because of the latter's supposed sickness. He died after Anton beat him up, and hit his head to a hard rock.
Daria Ramirez	as Amparo Asuncion	Choleng's mother and Sabel's grandmother. She had taken care of Sabel when Choleng worked abroad.

=== Extended cast ===
- Spanky Manikan† as Tino
- Bryan Homecillo as Jefferson
- Shey Bustamante as Kimberly
- Natasha Cabrera as Twinkle
- Eagle Riggs as Donna
- Aldred Gatchalian as Alvin
- DJ Durano as Father Manny
- Chinggoy Alonzo† as Father John

=== Special participation ===
- Tonton Gutierrez as Julio de Dios
- Precious Lara Quigaman as Cassandra Zaragosa
- Mutya Orquia as Young Sabel Asuncion 4 years old
- Abby Bautista as Young Sabel Asuncion 8 years old
- Diamond Delani as Young Candido "Dido" De Dios
- Rusianne Jandrisa Ilao as Young Raymond Sandoval
- Kimberly Fulgar as Young Twinkle

== Development ==
After five years in showbiz, Jessy Mendiola is now in the line of one Kapamilya Drama Princesses who are now all full-fledged drama heroines. After Mendiola's participation in the hit teleserye Kung Tayo'y Magkakalayo, she was given the primetime soap Sabel, based on the 1981 classic movie Bata Pa Si Sabel—which starred award-winning film and television icons Snooky Serna and Albert Martinez, under Regal Films—and like many classic films under Regal Entertainment that were classics such as Underage, which was used as a Your Song Sunday presentation. Sabel was the first and only teleserye of AJ Perez as a lead star before his death on April 17, 2011.

== See also ==
- List of programs broadcast by ABS-CBN
- List of ABS-CBN Studios original drama series
