= 2007 Metro Manila Film Festival =

Film festival edition

- Date: December 25, 2007 to January 7, 2008
- Site: Manila

Highlights
- Best Picture: Resiklo
- Most awards: Resiklo (9)

Television coverage
- Network: RPN 9

The 33rd Metro Manila Film Festival ran from December 25, 2007 to January 7, 2008.

Maricel Soriano, Jinggoy Estrada and the movie, Resiklo topped the 2007 Metro Manila Film Festival. Soriano and Estrada took home the Best Actress and Best Actor awards for their performances in the films Bahay Kubo: A Pinoy Mano Po! and Katas ng Saudi respectively. Ramon "Bong" Revilla, Jr.'s Resiklo won eight awards including the Best Picture and Best Supporting Actor for Roi Vinzon among others. Second-consecutive winners Nash Aguas and Jose Javier Reyes received the Best Child Performer and Best Screenplay respectively.

Other awardees include Best Director for Cesar Apolinario, Metro Manila Film Festival Award for Best Supporting Actress for Bahay Kubo: A Pinoy Mano Po!'s Eugene Domingo, and Gatpuno Antonio J. Villegas Cultural Awards for both Bahay Kubo: A Pinoy Mano Po! and Katas ng Saudi.

== Entries ==
There are two batches of films in competition, the first batch was shown from December 25, while the second batch was shown on January 1, 2008.

Title	Starring	Studio	Director	Genre
First batch
Bahay Kubo: A Pinoy Mano Po!	Maricel Soriano, Eric Quizon, Marian Rivera, Shaina Magdayao, Yasmien Kurdi, Eugene Domingo, Mark Herras, Rayver Cruz, Jiro Manio, Bearwin Meily, Gloria Romero	Regal Films	Joel Lamangan	Comedy, Drama
Enteng Kabisote 4: Okay Ka, Fairy Ko... The Beginning of the Legend	Vic Sotto, Kristine Hermosa, Ian Veneracion, Francine Prieto, Carlos Agassi, Michael de Mesa, Oyo Boy Sotto, G. Toengi, Jose Manalo, Aiza Seguerra, Ruby Rodriguez, Peque Gallaga	Octoarts Films and M-Zet Productions	Tony Y. Reyes	Action, Adventure, Comedy
Katas ng Saudi	Jinggoy Estrada, Lorna Tolentino, Bayani Agbayani, Eugene Domingo, Arron Villaflor, Julian Estrada, Shaina Magdayao, Rayver Cruz	Maverick Films	Jose Javier Reyes	Comedy, Drama
Resiklo	Ramon 'Bong' Revilla, Jr., Dingdong Dantes, Jennylyn Mercado, Bobby Andrews, Jairus Aquino, Paolo Contis, Ella Cruz, Mylene Dizon, King Gutierrez, Michelle Madrigal, Bryan Revilla, Jolo Revilla, Ramjen Revilla, TJ Trinidad, Benjie Paras, Roi Vinzon	Imus Productions and Media Asia Films	Mark Reyes	Action, Fantasy, Sci-Fi
Sakal, Sakali, Saklolo	Judy Ann Santos, Ryan Agoncillo, Ms. Gloria Diaz, Ms. Gina Pareno, Ariel Ureta, Dominic Ochoa, Juliana Palermo, Derek Ramsay	Star Cinema	Jose Javier Reyes	Comedy, Romance
Shake, Rattle and Roll 9	Episode 1: "Christmas Tree" - Nash Aguas, Gina Alajar, Sophia Baars, Tonton Gutierrez, John Lapus, Lovi Poe, John Prats, Boots Anson-Roa; Episode 2: "Bangungot" - Jason Gainza, Roxanne Guinoo, Jaymee Joaquin, Pauleen Luna, Andrea Torres; Episode 3: "Engkanto" - Jojo Alejar, Sam Concepcion, Mart Escudero, Matt Evans, Katrina Halili, Hector Macaso, Jewel Mische, Melissa Ricks, Felix Roco	Regal Films	Paul Daza, Topel Lee and Mike Tuviera	Horror
Second batch
Anak ng Kumander	Manny Pacquiao, Ara Mina, Valerie Concepcion, Lara Morena, Roi Vinzon, Dante Rivero, Perla Bautista, Efren Reyes Jr.	MP Promotions	Jose "Kaka" Balagtas	Action
Banal	Christopher de Leon, Paolo Contis, Alfred Vargas, Paolo Paraiso, Cassandra Ponti, Ina Alegre, Joey 'Pepe' Smith, Pen Medina	ComGuild Productions	Cesar Apolinario	Action, Drama
Desperadas	Ruffa Gutierrez, Rufa Mae Quinto, Iza Calzado, Marian Rivera, Wendell Ramos, Jay-R, TJ Trinidad	Regal Films	Joel Lamangan	Comedy, Romance

== Winners and nominees ==
Winners are listed first and highlighted in boldface.

=== Festival awards ===
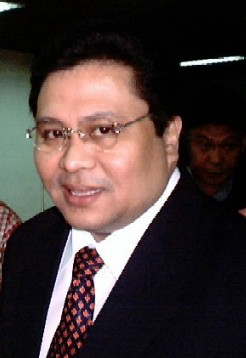
Jinggoy Estrada, Best Actor winner

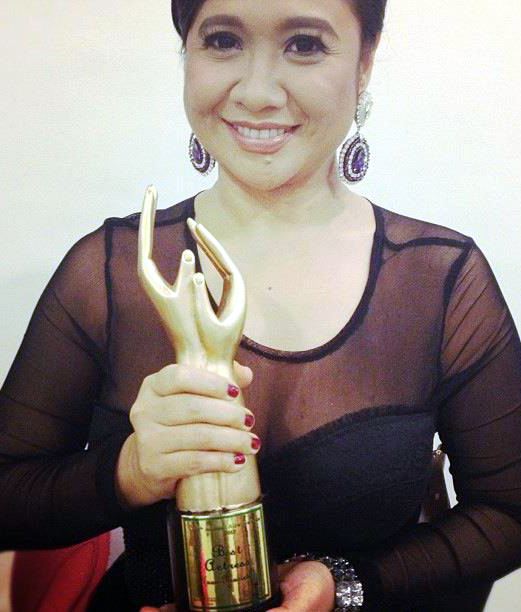
Eugene Domingo, Best Supporting Actress winner

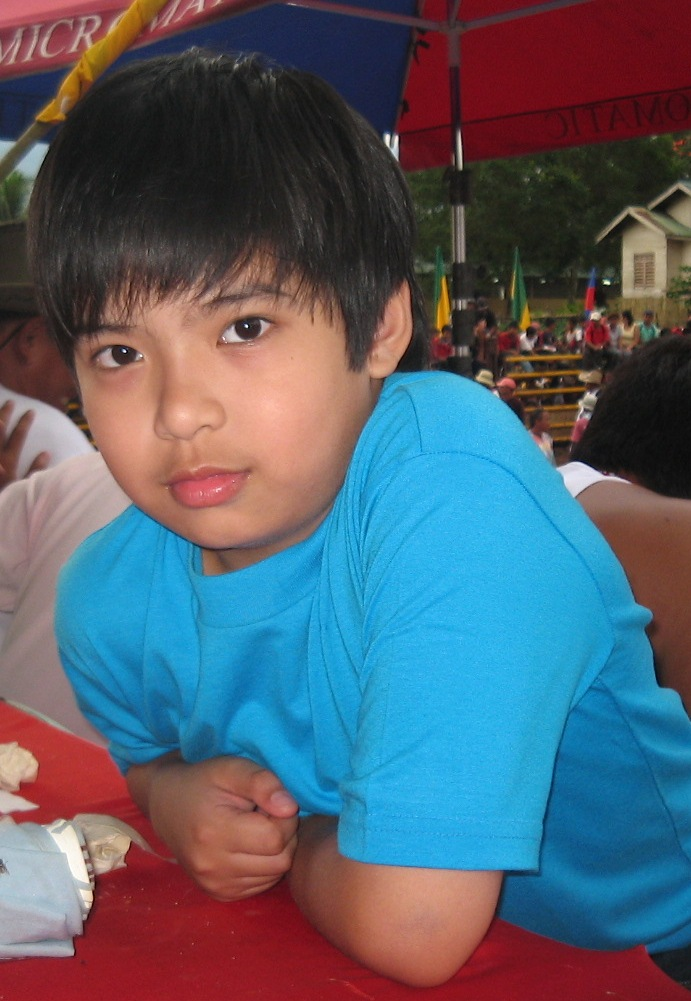
Nash Aguas, Best Child Performer winner

Best Picture	Best Director
**Resiklo - Imus Productions and Media Asia Films**; Sakal, Sakali, Saklolo - Star Cinema (2nd Best Picture); Enteng Kabisote 4: Okay Ka, Fairy Ko: The Beginning of the Legend - Octoarts Films and M-Zet Productions (3rd Best Picture)	**Cesar Apolinario - Banal**
Best Actor	Best Actress
**Jinggoy Estrada - Katas ng Saudi**	**Maricel Soriano - Bahay Kubo: A Pinoy Mano Po!**
Best Supporting Actor	Best Supporting Actress
**Roi Vinzon - Resiklo**	**Eugene Domingo - Bahay Kubo: A Pinoy Mano Po!**
Best Cinematography	Best Production Design
**Jay Linao - Resiklo**	**Rodel Cruz - Resiklo**
Best Child Performer	Best Editing
**Nash Aguas - Shake, Rattle and Roll 9**	**Jay Halili - Resiklo**
Best Original Story	Best Screenplay
**Mac Cruz and Cesar Apolinario - Banal**	**José Javier Reyes - Katas ng Saudi**
Best Original Theme Song	Best Musical Score
**Rusty Fernandez ("Wala Na Bang Pag-Asa?") - Anak ng Kumander**	**Von De Guzman - Bahay Kubo: A Pinoy Mano Po!**
Best Visual Effects	Best Make-up Artist
**Ignite Media - Resiklo**	**Rosalinda Lopez - Desperadas**
Best Sound Recording	Best Float
**Ditoy Aguila - Resiklo**	**Resiklo - Imus Productions and Media Asia Films**
Most Gender-Sensitive Film	Gatpuno Antonio J. Villegas Cultural Awards
**Desperadas - Regal Films**	**Bahay Kubo: A Pinoy Mano Po! - Regal Films** and; **Katas ng Saudi - Maverick Films**

== Multiple awards ==
Awards	Film
9	Resiklo
4	Bahay Kubo: A Pinoy Mano Po!
4	Shake, Rattle & Roll 9
3	Katas ng Saudi
2	Sakal, Sakali, Saklolo
2	Desperadas
2	Banal

== Ceremony Information ==
The awards night ended in less than an hour after festival organizers decided to just announce the winners without even mentioning the nominees for each category. The organizers explained that it had to be rushed and had to end at exactly 9pm because a concert, featuring singer Lani Misalucha, was scheduled right after the awards ceremonies.

== Box office gross ==
Entry	Gross Ticket Sales				
Entry	December 25	December 26	December 30	January 3	January 7
Sakal, Sakali, Saklolo	₱ 17,000,000	₱ 29,000,000	₱ 68,300,000*	₱ 97,000,000*	₱ 122,893,166*
Enteng Kabisote 4: Okay Ka, Fairy Ko: The Beginning of the Legend	₱ 19,500,000*	₱ 32,000,000*	₱ 66,600,000	₱ 91,000,000	₱ 104,632,792
Shake, Rattle and Roll 9	₱ 12,700,000	₱ 20,000,000	₱ 41,600,000	₱ 57,000,000	₱ 68,021,363
Desparadas	–	–	–	₱ 17,000,000	₱ 35,501,113
Resiklo	₱ 6,100,000	₱ 9,000,000	₱ 15,600,000	₱ 20,000,000	₱ 21,668,242
Bahay Kubo: A Pinoy Mano Po!	₱ 3,800,000	₱ 6,000,000	₱ 12,600,000	₱ 16,000,000	₱ 19,439,119
Katas ng Saudi	₱ 843,000	₱ 1,400,000	₱ 2,800,000	₱ 3,100,000	₱ 3,280,522
Anak ng Kumander	–	–	–	₱ 1,500,000	₱ 2,457,113
Banal	–	–	–	₱ 1,400,000	₱ 2,347,852
				TOTAL	₱ 380,241,282

Preceded by 2006 Metro Manila Film Festival	Metro Manila Film Festival; 2007	Succeeded by 2008 Metro Manila Film Festival
