= Sakal, Sakali, Saklolo =

2007 film by José Javier Reyes

- Sakal, Sakali, Saklolo movie poster
- Directed by: Jose Javier Reyes
- Written by: Jose Javier Reyes
- Produced by: Charo Santos-Concio; Malou N. Santos
- Starring: Judy Ann Santos; Ryan Agoncillo
- Cinematography: Jun Aves
- Edited by: Vito Cajili
- Music by: Jesse Lucas
- Production company: Star Cinema
- Release date: December 25, 2007
- Running time: 109 minutes
- Country: Philippines
- Language: Filipino
- Box office: ₱150 million (as of January 12, 2008)

Sakal, Sakali, Saklolo (Choked, Maybe, Help Me) is a 2007 Filipino romantic comedy film written and directed by Jose Javier Reyes. It is sequel to the 2006 film Kasal, Kasali, Kasalo with Judy Ann Santos and Ryan Agoncillo reprising their roles (both from Ysabella until it ended on January 18, 2008).

The film was released through Star Cinema on December 25, 2007, as part of the 33rd Metro Manila Film Festival.

== Plot ==
=== Prologue ===
Angie and Jed were jolted awake by the sound of their son Rafa crying. As Jed prepared to get up and attend to him, he stumbled and fell off the bed, landing with a thud.

=== Sakal ===
As first-time parents, Jed and Angie struggle to balance work and caring for their son, Rafa. They rarely visit their families, avoiding Belita, who is focused on her campaign for councilor of Cabanatuan, Nueva Ecija. Rommel, frustrated by Belita’s political ambitions, is especially irritated when she orders neighbors to paint their houses yellow, her favorite color. Meanwhile, Charito is heartbroken that Jed never visits her and Carlos.

Tensions rise when Angie is promoted to executive producer of a public affairs show. Jed is furious, fearing it will mean even less time for their family, but Angie insists they need financial stability. Their relationship is further strained when Angie discovers a photo of Jed with Mariel. She confronts him, but he reassures her that they are just friends and that Mariel is engaged.

Everything shifts when Rafa falls ill. Realizing her priorities, Angie decides to adjust her work schedule to be there for her son.

=== Sakali ===
Jed and Angie joyfully celebrated Rafa’s fourth birthday, surrounded by family. Carlos and Charito noticed Rafa conversing with his nanny in Visayan, while Belita observed that he wasn’t allowed to eat sweets like ice cream and chocolates. Meanwhile, Carlos discovered that Rafa’s toy collection excluded toy guns and swords, sparking curiosity about their parenting choices. Their careful and somewhat strict approach became a topic of discussion among Charito, Carlos, and Belita.

Seeking time together, Jed proposed a trip to Barcelona, Spain, but the challenge was finding someone to care for Rafa in their absence. Angie's friend Kaye offered to step in, but Belita, Charito, and Carlos insisted on taking charge of their grandson.

Upon arriving in Barcelona, the couple’s excitement was dampened when Jed discovered his luggage had gone missing. They were soon joined by Jed’s former classmate, Mark, who helped them settle in.

Back in the Philippines, Charito delighted in spoiling Rafa with an assortment of cakes, only for him to suffer stomach aches, worrying Angie from afar. Tensions escalated when Belita, Charito, and Carlos found Rafa in tears, claiming Dennis had hurt him. Furious, Belita confronted Dennis and lashed out, provoking Dennis’s father, Alex, who retaliated by pressing charges against her.

When news of the incident reached Jed and Angie, they immediately decided to return to Manila, realizing that family matters required their presence more than ever..

=== Saklolo ===
Angie received a visit from her two brothers, who informed her that Belita is now in a relationship with Douglas, a Filipino-American widower from Chicago and cousin of the Vice Mayor. Meanwhile, Jed learned that his mother, Charito, has a breast tumor. Although the biopsy revealed it to be benign, Charito insisted on further tests.

Later, Angie encountered her brother Otap, whom she scolded for running away. He confessed that he couldn't stand Douglas, who frequently stayed at their house. Angie confronted their mother about allowing Douglas to sleep over, but Belita insisted she would make her own choices without her children's permission. Angie also discovered from Rommel that Belita is filing for annulment to marry Douglas legally.

During a family gathering, Belita announced her engagement to Douglas. Angie confronted her, questioning the motivation behind the marriage. Belita claimed she wanted to be happy, but Angie reminded her that she and her brothers were there to support her. Jed comforted Angie, assuring her that she didn't mean what she said to their mother.

When Jed and Angie visited Belita, they found her depressed after separating from Douglas, who wanted her to move to the United States. Belita planned to take Otap with her to pursue a college degree, but Douglas disagreed, leading her to choose Otap over him.

Amidst these family challenges, Jed, Angie, and Rafa celebrated Christmas with loved ones. Rommel discovered Angie's unusual craving for pickles, which led to the joyful revelation that she is pregnant again, prompting a celebration among the entire family.

== Cast and characters ==
=== Main cast ===
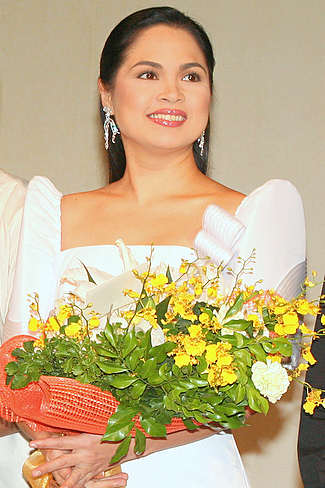
Judy Ann Santos portrays Angelita "Angie" Mariano-Valeriano.

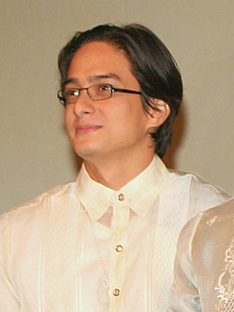
Ryan Agoncillo portrays Jerome "Jed" Valeriano

- Judy Ann Santos as Angelita "Angie" Mariano-Valeriano
- Ryan Agoncillo as Jerome "Jed" Valeriano

=== Supporting cast ===
- Gina Pareño as Belita
- Gloria Diaz as Charito
- Ariel Ureta as Carlos
- Soliman Cruz as Rommell
- Derek Ramsay as Ronnie
- Juliana Palermo as Mariel
- AJ Perez as Otap
- Timothy Chan as Rafa
- Dominic Ochoa as Kenneth
- Lui Villaruz as Erwin
- Kat Alano as Sandra
- Tuesday Vargas as Catalina
- Cheena Crab as Cora
- Byron Ortile as Kevin
- Ricky Davao as Alex
- Ketchup Eusebio as Dodi
- Steven Fermo as Bokbok
- Miles Ocampo as Jane
- Dagul as Bobot
- Jorge Harris Concordia as Bebot
- Carlo Balmaceda as Bronson

== Reception ==
=== Box office ===
The movie debuted number 2 at the box office grossing ₱17 million, on its opening day. On its 4th day of release, Sakal, Sakali, Saklolo jump to #1, overtaking Enteng Kabisote 4 at the box office, bringing the total of PHP68.3 Million. As of January 12, the film had grossed ₱122.9 million. As per announcement made by ABS-CBN's Saturday edition talk show (Entertainment Live) last January 26, 2008, the movie grossed for a total of over 150 million making it the highest-grossing movie of 2007.

=== Accolades ===
Year	Award-Giving Body	Category	Recipient	Result
2007	Metro Manila Film Festival	Best Picture	Sakal, Sakali, Saklolo	2nd
2007	Metro Manila Film Festival	Best Float	Sakal, Sakali, Saklolo	2nd
2008	6th Gawad Tanglaw	Best Film	Sakal, Sakali, Saklolo	Won
2008	6th Gawad Tanglaw	Best Director	Jose Javier Reyes	Won

=== Reception ===
Philippine Senator Aquilino Pimentel, Jr. criticized the film, particularly the scene which smacks of an ethnic slur to non-Tagalog speaking Filipinos when the character of portrayed by Gloria Diaz exclaimed to her grandchild's nannies: "Bakit pinapalaki ninyong Bisaya ang apo ko?" (Why are you rearing my grandchild as a Visayan?) The senator, who hailed from Mindanao, demanded an apology from producer Star Cinema, claiming that it makes non-Tagalog speaking Filipinos "as if they are less Filipino than the Tagalog people". Iligan City-based Call for Justice, Inc., referred to this dialog as "a typical Imperial Manila mentality".
