= Resiklo =

- Theatrical release poster

Japanese name
- Kanji: トランスバトラー
- Literal meaning: Transbattler
Transcriptions
- Revised Hepburn: Toransubatoraa
- Directed by: Mark A. Reyes
- Written by: Mark A. Reyes
- Produced by: Andrea M. Bautista
- Starring: Ramon "Bong" Revilla Jr.
- Cinematography: Jay Linao
- Edited by: Aleks Castañeda; Jay Halili
- Music by: Allan Feliciano; Arnold Buena
- Production companies: Imus Productions; Ignite Media
- Distributed by: Imus Productions
- Release dates: December 22, 2007 (SM Megamall premiere): December 25, 2007
- Running time: 110 minutes
- Country: Philippines
- Language: Filipino
- Box office: ₱21.66 million (MMFF 2007 run)

Resiklo (lit. 'Recycle') is a 2007 Filipino post-apocalyptic science fiction film written and directed by Mark A. Reyes and starring Ramon "Bong" Revilla Jr., Dingdong Dantes, and Jennylyn Mercado. It is the entry of Revilla's outfit, Imus Productions, to the 2007 Metro Manila Film Festival.

== Premise ==
Set in December 2021, Resiklo is the story of Crisval Sarmiento, an ex-military Colonel who leads a rag-tag group of survivors in the Philippines against the insect-like alien invaders known as the Balangs (locusts). "Because of the enormous expenditures in resources during the invasion (hinted in the movie's opening credits), the humans are forced to scavenge the destroyed landscape for anything that could be recycled and put to use at their secret sanctuary, called Paraiso (Paradise).

They are in a race against time, as in addition to the resource gathering, the survivors are fighting to eliminate the Balangs and their human collaborators, the Mutanos (mutated humans), while keeping Paraiso's location secret and along the way, uncovering the truth behind the invasion as well.

== Cast ==
Main cast

- Bong Revilla as Colonel Crisval Sarmiento
- Jennylyn Mercado as Bianca
- Dingdong Dantes as Angelo

Supporting cast

- Jolo Revilla as Ice
- Paolo Contis as Dens
- Michelle Madrigal as Dr. Miles
- Empress Schuck as Gila
- Ella Cruz as Kiara
- Jairus Aquino as Arkin
- Bobby Andrews as Dos
- Mylene Dizon as Alura
- Roi Vinzon as Hades
- Benjie Paras as Deecon
- TJ Trinidad as Jerson

== Production ==
The majority of the visual effects were handled by Riot, Ignite Media, and Digital Dodge, with Erick Torrente supervising the special effects.

== International releases ==
In Japan, Resiklo was retitled to Transbattler (トランスバトラー), with a film poster emphasizing the presence of giant robots in the story and playing on the popularity of the Transformers franchise.

In the United States, Resiklo was re-released as Transmutators in 2023, with a film poster also seemingly mocking the likes of the Transformers franchise.

== Critical reception ==
The CBCP's CINEMA (Catholic Initiative for Enlightened Movie Appreciation) gave the film a score of three out of five stars, stating it as a straight and simple sci-fi movie with an "ensemble cast that acts out the story."

The mecha action scenes were dismissed as copycats of the battle scenes from Transformers. Director Mark Reyes insisted that such was not the case, stating that the concept for the movie was made before the Hollywood film was in development.

== Accolades ==
Year	Award-giving body	Category	Recipient	Result
2007	Metro Manila Film Festival	Best Picture	Resiklo	Won
2007	Metro Manila Film Festival	Best Supporting Actor	Roi Vinzon	Won
2007	Metro Manila Film Festival	Best Cinematography	Jay Linao	Won
2007	Metro Manila Film Festival	Best Production Design	Rodel Cruz	Won
2007	Metro Manila Film Festival	Best Visual Effects	Ignite Media	Won
2007	Metro Manila Film Festival	Best Sound Recording	Ditoy Aguila	Won
2007	Metro Manila Film Festival	Best Editing	Jay Halili	Won
2007	Metro Manila Film Festival	Best Float	Resiklo	Won
2007	Metro Manila Film Festival	People's Choice for Best Float	Resiklo (1st Runner-up)	Won

Awards and achievements
Preceded by Enteng Kabisote 3: Okay Ka, Fairy Ko: The Legend Goes On and On and On	Metro Manila Film Festival Award for Best Picture; 2007	Succeeded by Baler
