= Bahay Kubo: A Pinoy Mano Po! =

- Official movie poster
- Directed by: Joel Lamangan
- Screenplay by: RJ Nuevas; Suzette Doctolero
- Story by: Lily Y. Monteverde; RJ Nuevas; Suzette Doctolero
- Produced by: Lily Y. Monteverde; Roselle Monteverde-Teo
- Starring: Maricel Soriano; Eric Quizon; Gloria Romero; Marian Rivera; Shaina Magdayao; Yasmien Kurdi
- Cinematography: Charlie Peralta
- Edited by: Marya Ignacio
- Music by: Von De Guzman
- Production company: Regal Entertainment
- Distributed by: GMA Pictures
- Release date: December 25, 2007
- Running time: 128 minutes
- Country: Philippines
- Language: Filipino

Bahay Kubo: A Pinoy Mano Po! is a 2007 Filipino comedy-drama film starring Maricel Soriano and Eric Quizon. It was one of the official entries of the Metro Manila Film Festival. The story setting is patterned after the films of the Mano Po series with Mestizo/Austronesian Filipino characters instead of Chinese Filipino characters.

== Plot ==
Eden lives in a bahay kubo in the middle of a farm near a river, with Lola Ida and her friend Marang. One day, after her regular routine of selling her produce in the market, she finds Lily. She decides to adopt Lily, then finds and adopted Dahlia. Soon after, the number of children increases, earning jealous eyes and DSWD officials trying to intervene, but it is foiled when Eden's friends help by claiming some of the children as theirs.

Marang, who has a racket by posing as a bit player in films shot in their town, puts her in a date with Perry who is blind. Later, they marry and live in the hut. Perry later leaves for Manila, after creating the Garden of Eden, her flower stall. He later returns sharing good news that they could migrate to Manila. They then live a rich life, hiring Jake as a gardener, and having the children enter prestigious schools.

Their problems begin when her husband is indicted for fraud and forced to hide. This causes their house to be foreclosed and they drive to their old home, returning to selling plants, flowers and other homegrown items. However, the worst is to come. The adopted child's parents claim them back. JR is trying to find his parents. Dahlia desperately tries to be an actress. Rose and Lily argue for their mother's affection, the former leaves home after her mother sides with the latter. Ida dies of old age, leaving Lily, JR and Marang to be Eden's counsellors. One day, Marang and Habagat decide to marry and Lily reveals that she competed against Rose for Eden's affection.

Rose later receives a letter from her father during a shift in a fast food restaurant, apologizing what he has done to his family.

Many days later, Eden is disturbed by Marang that Dahlia had become an actress, which slumps Eden even further. Overnight, while she is sleeping, she hears caroling and decides to go out. The carolers are her own her children and her husband begged for forgiveness, which she then accepts.

== Cast ==
- Maricel Soriano as Eden : The wife of Perry, the adopted mother of Lily, Dahlia, JR, Jasmine, Violet, and Daisy, and the biological mother of Rose.
- Eric Quizon as Perry : The husband of Eden, the adopted father of Lily, Dahlia, JR, Jasmine, Violet, and Daisy, and the biological father of Rose.
- Eugene Domingo as Marang : The best friend of Eden and the wife of Habagat.
- Gloria Romero † as Lola Ida : The mother of Eden, the adopted grandmother of Lily, Dahlia, JR, Jasmine, Violet, and Daisy, and the biological grandmother of Rose.
- Shaina Magdayao as Rose : The only biological daughter of Eden and Perry, the biological granddaughter of Ida, and the step-sibling of Lily, Dahlia, JR, Jasmine, Violet, and Daisy. She always has a rivalry on her step-sibling, Lily. She also hates Cholo so much because he kept on annoying her.
- Marian Rivera as Lily : The first daughter Eden adopted. She always has a rivalry on her step-sibling, Rose.
- Yasmien Kurdi as Dahlia : The second daughter Eden adopted whose ambition was to become a famous actress.
- Jiro Manio as JR : The third person and only son Eden adopted.
- Isabella de Leon as Jasmine : Along with her biological sister Violet, she is the fourth person and third daughter Eden adopted.
- Rita Daniela as Violet : Along with her biological sister Jasmine, she is the fourth person and third daughter Eden adopted.
- Sam Bumatay as Daisy : The fifth and last person Eden adopted and is also the youngest among her seven siblings.
- Rayver Cruz as Cholo : A classmate of Rose who kept annoying her.
- Mark Herras as Jake : A classmate of Lily who kept stalking her.
- Bearwin Meily as Habagat : The husband of Marang.
- AJ Perez † as Daniel : Cholo's best friend.
- Bela Padilla as Janet : Rose's best friend and a classmate of Cholo and Daniel.
- Anita Linda † as Amelia : The wife of houses.
- Malou Crisologo as Aling Tiny : Another friend of Eden and Marang.
- Karla Estrada as Loida : The biological mother of Jasmine and Violet
- Mara Schnittka as Young Lily : A classmate of Jake who kept stalking her.
- Jane Oineza as Young Rose : A classmate of Cholo who kept annoying her.
- Bea Binene as Young Dahlia

== Awards ==
| Year | Award-Giving Body | Category | Recipient | Result |
|---|---|---|---|---|
| 2007 | Metro Manila Film Festival | Best Actress | Maricel Soriano | Won |
| 2007 | Metro Manila Film Festival | Best Supporting Actress | Eugene Domingo | Won |
| 2007 | Metro Manila Film Festival | Gatpuno Antonio J. Villegas Cultural Awards | Bahay Kubo: A Pinoy Mano Po! (tied with Katas ng Saudi) | Won |
| 2007 | Metro Manila Film Festival | Best Musical Score | Von De Guzman | Won |
