= Sam Bumatay =

Filipino actress

- Born: Samantha Nicole Ubaldo Bumatay; February 12, 1999 (age 27); Manila, Philippines
- Education: University of Santo Tomas
- Years active: 2004–2010

Sam Bumatay (born February 12, 1999) is a Filipino former actress. She was the Ultimate Female Survivor winner in Starstruck Kids, a reality-based talent search show in the Philippines, aired by GMA network.

== Career ==
Bumatay was product of GMA Network's StarStruck Kids talent contest. Bumatay won the Ultimate Female Survivor along with Kurt Perez as the Ultimate Male Survivor in 2004. She played as Lawiswis in Mulawin (2004), starring Angel Locsin, Richard Gutierrez and Dennis Trillo, among others. Bumatay played as the young robot in QTV 11 sitcom Ay, Robot! (2005) with Ogie Alcasid, Tanya Garcia, Ryza Cenon, C.J. Muere and Eunice Lagusad, directed by Al Tantay. In 2006, she was nominated as Best Child Actress in Mulawin: The Movie for FAMAS Awards and Star Awards For Movies.

== Filmography ==
=== Film ===
Year	Title	Role	Notes
2005	Mulawin: The Movie	Wis	
2007	Paraiso: Tatlong Kwento Ng Pag-Asa	Jane (segment "Umiyak Man ang Langit")	
2007	Bahay Kubo: A Pinoy Mano Po!	Daisy	
2009	Shake, Rattle & Roll XI	Girl patient (segment "Diablo")	
2010	Mamarazzi	Young Violet	

=== Television ===
Year	Title	Role
2003	StarStruck Kids	Herself/Contestant
2004	Magpakailanman	Young Mel Tiangco
2004	Eat Bulaga!	Herself/Performer
2004	Mulawin	Lawiswis
2005	Extra Challenge	Herself
2005	Ay, Robot!	Sam
2006	Magpakailanman	Young Aiza Seguerra
2007	Princess Charming	Andrea
2007	Muli	Young Cheryl
2007	Kamandag	Young Jenny
2007	Impostora	Kokay
