= Mulawin =

Philippine television drama series

- Title card
- Genre: Fantasy drama
- Created by: Don Michael Perez; Dode Cruz
- Written by: Don Michael Perez; Abi Lam; Andrew Paredes
- Directed by: Dominic Zapata; Lore Reyes
- Starring: Richard Gutierrez; Angel Locsin; Dennis Trillo
- Theme music composer: Jay Durias
- Opening theme: "The Flight" by Richard Gonzales
- Ending theme: "Ikaw Nga" by South Border
- Country of origin: Philippines
- Original language: Tagalog
- No. of episodes: 166

Production
- Executive producers: Edlyn P. Tallada; Helen Rose S. Sese
- Editor: Eddie Esmedia
- Camera setup: Multiple-camera setup
- Running time: 19–41 minutes
- Production company: GMA Entertainment TV

Original release
- Network: GMA Network
- Release: August 2, 2004 – March 18, 2005

Related
- Mulawin: The Movie; Encantadia; Iglot; Mulawin vs. Ravena

Mulawin is a Philippine television drama fantasy series broadcast by GMA Network. Directed by Don Michael Perez and Dode Cruz, it stars Richard Gutierrez, Angel Locsin and Dennis Trillo. It premiered on August 2, 2004 on the network's Telebabad line up. The series concluded on March 18, 2005, with a total of 166 episodes.

The series is streaming online on YouTube. The success of the series led to television spin-offs: Encantadia in 2005 and Iglot in 2011. Continuations of the series, the film Mulawin: The Movie was released in 2005, and the television series Mulawin vs. Ravena aired in 2017.

== Premise ==
The story centers around the species called "Mulawin" who once helped the humans save mother nature, then withdrew themselves and hid in the mountains due to humanity's greed. In the meantime, a rebel band of Mulawins called "Ravena" sought revenge against the humans. The peace between the humans and Mulawins depends on Aguiluz, the protector and Alwina, the envoy.

== Cast and characters ==
Cast

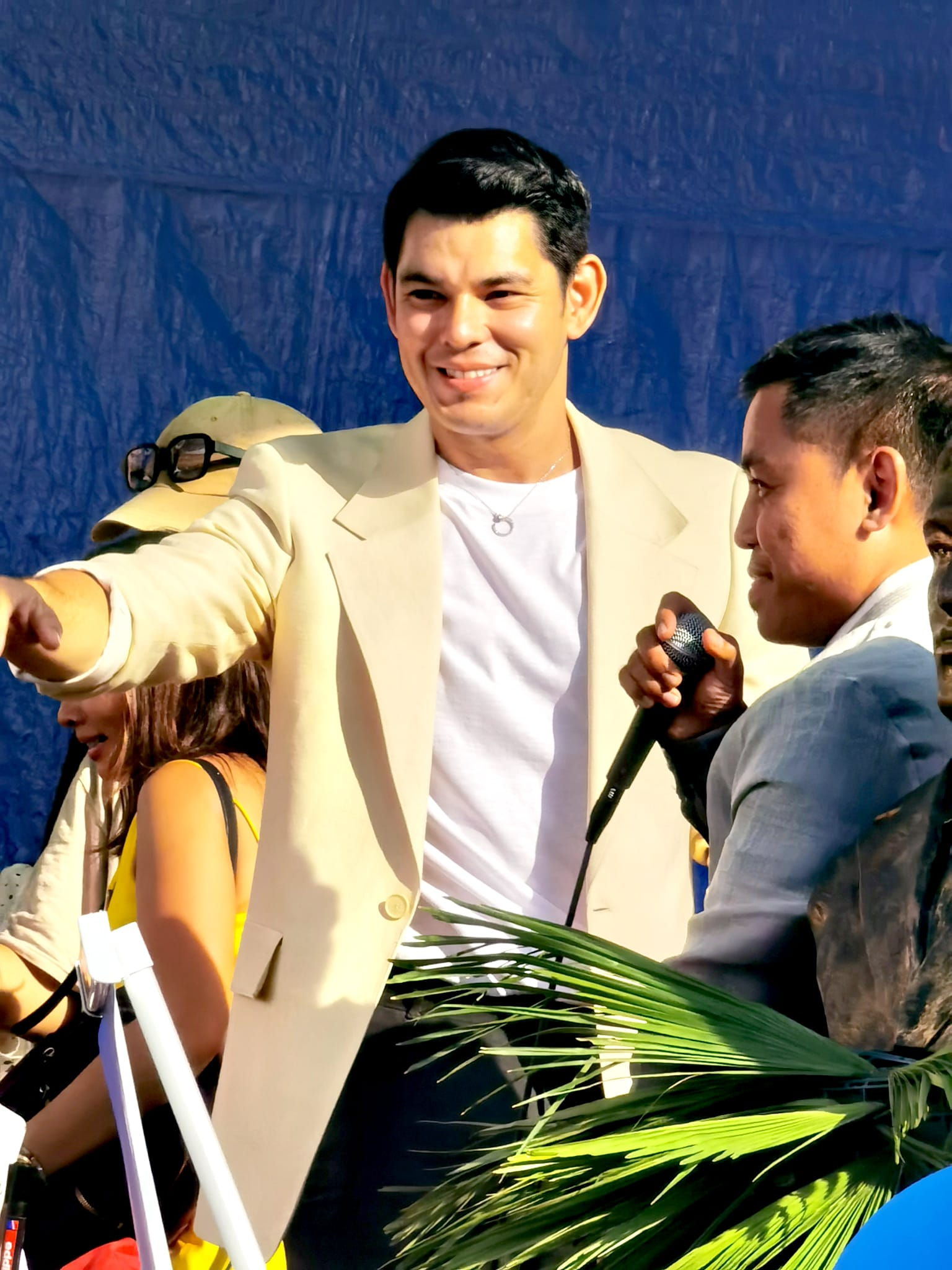
Richard Gutierrez

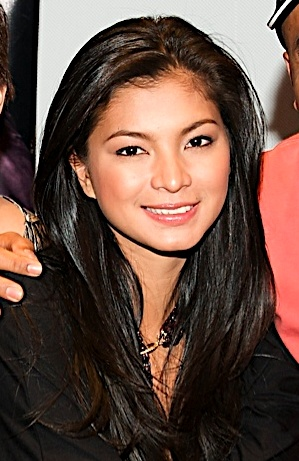
Angel Locsin

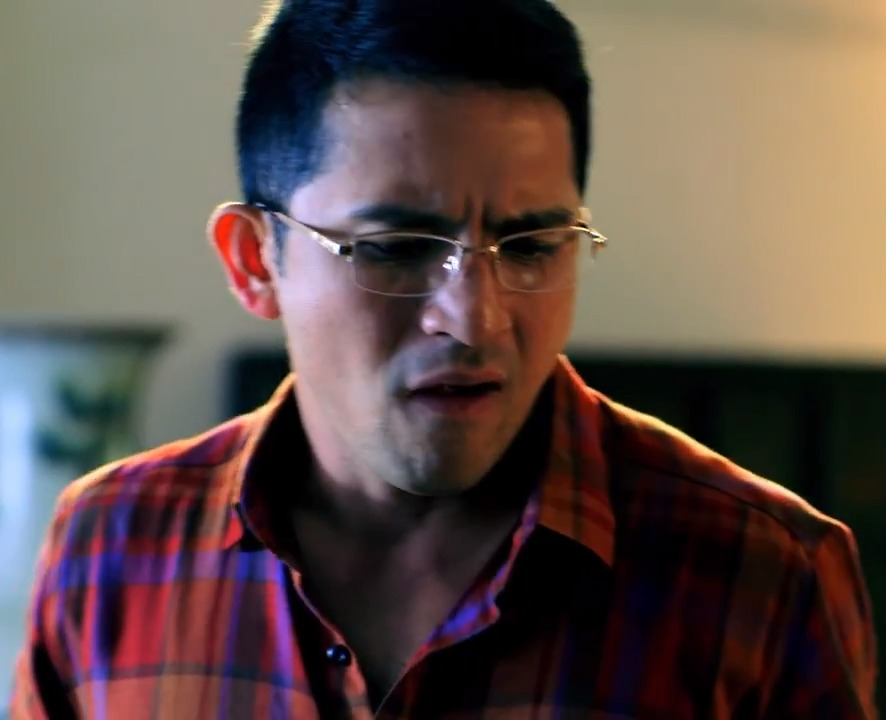
Dennis Trillo

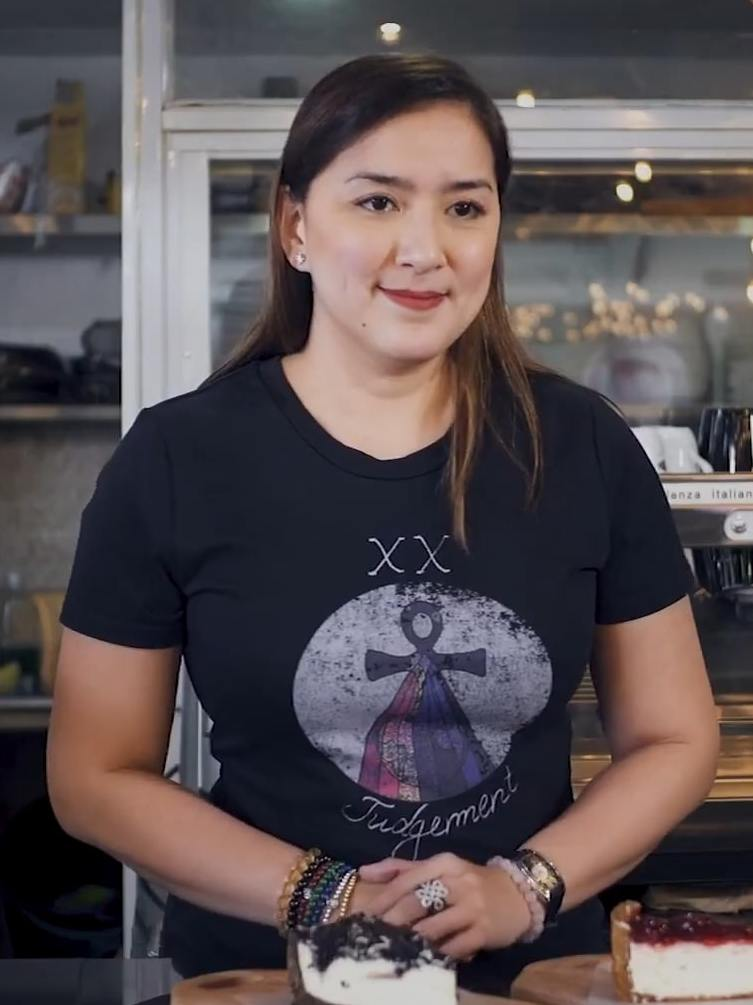
Ara Mina

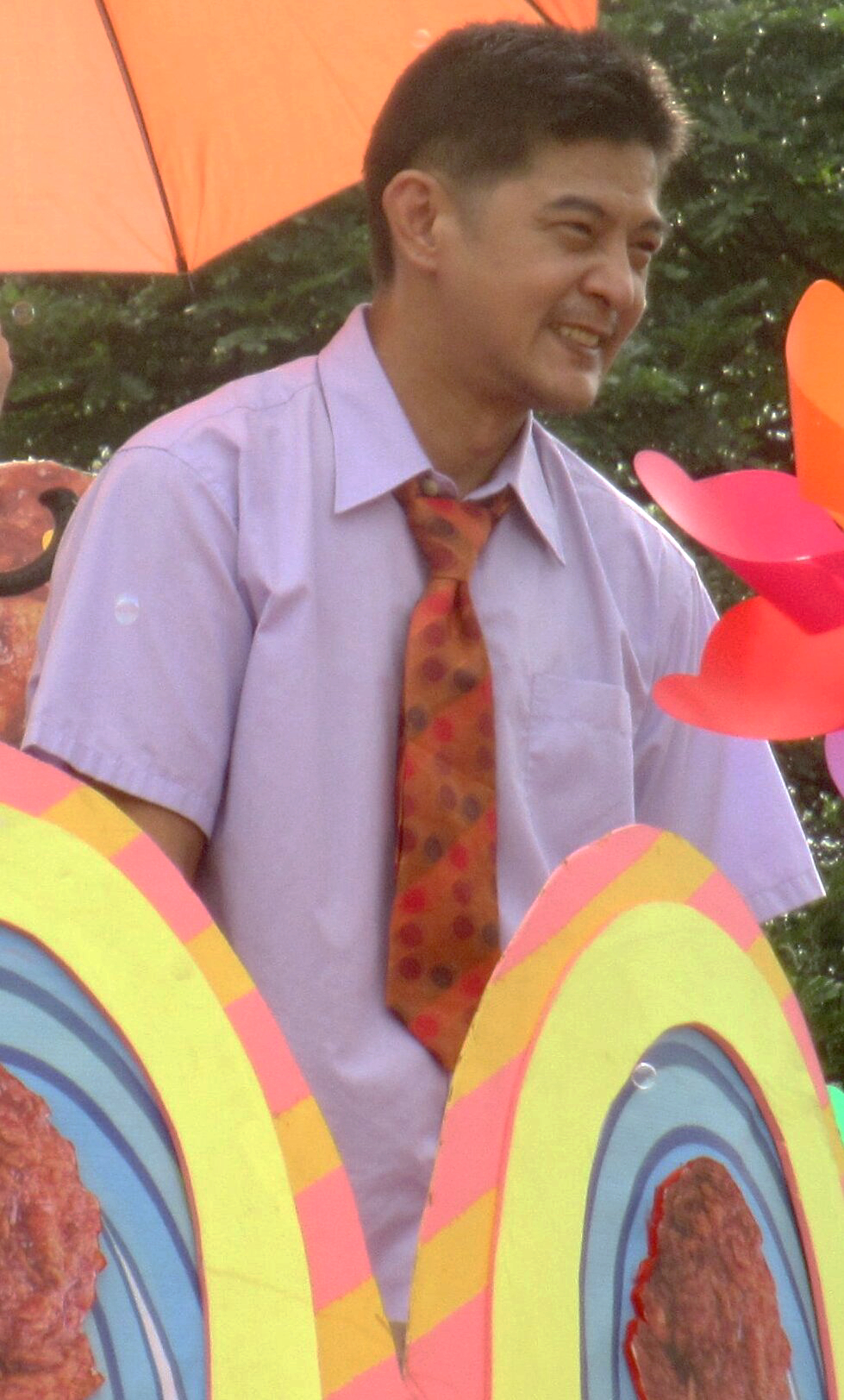
Romnick Sarmenta

Lead cast

- Richard Gutierrez as Aguiluz / Aguilar
- Angel Locsin as Alwina
- Dennis Trillo as Gabriel

Supporting cast

- Ara Mina as Vultra / Violeta / Veronica
- Gary Estrada as Rasmus
- Amy Austria as Lourdes
- Zoren Legaspi as Bagwis
- Romnick Sarmenta as Habagat
- Lloyd Samartino as Lucio Montenegro
- Karen delos Reyes as Savannah Montenegro
- Bearwin Meily as Kuwak / Makisig
- Bryan Revilla as Lino
- Pia Pilapil as Lucila Montenegro
- Marissa Sanchez as Tuka
- Alicia Alonzo as Rosing
- Kiel Rodriguez as Terong
- Bianca King as Aviona
- Jaja Bolivar as Biba
- Happy Lynn Sy as Yolly
- Eddie Gutierrez as Dakila

Recurring cast

- Miguel Tanfelix as Pagaspas / Gas
- Sam Bumatay as Lawiswis / Wis
- Tricia Roman as Pamela
- Michael de Mesa as Ravenum

Guest cast

- Kurt Perez as younger Aguiluz
- Kristel Fulgar as younger Alwina
- Paul Salas as younger Gabriel
- Shamel Leask as younger Aviona
- Eunice Lagusad as younger Biba
- Carmina Villarroel as Ina / Salimbay
- Tanya Garcia as Paloma
- Isabella de Leon as Mayi
- Rainier Castillo as older Pagaspas
- Denise Laurel as older Lawiswis
- Eagle Riggs as Dak-dak
- Bidz dela Cruz as Ngas-ngas
- Sasi Casas as Gad-gad
- Ang-ang - Portrayed by
- Michael Roy Jornales as Kuskos
- Musmos - Portrayed by
- Sakmal - Portrayed by
- Jeff Carpio as Laab
- Hampas - Portrayed by
- Procopio - Portrayed by
- Bianca- Portrayed by
- Princess Punzalan as Maningning
- Cristine Reyes as Estrea
- Shermaine Santiago as Oyayi
- Ehra Madrigal as Dalaginding
- Giselle Toengi as Ynang Reyna
- Sheryl Cruz as Linang
- Nancy Castiglione as Muyak
- James Blanco as Aramis
- Ian Veneracion as Panabon
- Bettina Carlos as Florona
- Katarina Perez as Banayad
- Mayumi - Portrayed by
- Daluyong - Portrayed by
- Jay Aquitania as Mulagat
- Edwin Zarate as Lumbas
- Roi Vinzon as Daragit
- Balasik - Portrayed by
- Geneva Cruz as Haraya
- Botchok - Portrayed by
- Ching ching - Portrayed by
- Caloy / Laki / Hidalgo

== Casting ==
Actress Maxene Magalona was approached to play the role of Alwina, which she declined. The role was later given to Angel Locsin.

== Music ==
In October 2004, GMA Records released an album entitled Songs Inspired By Mulawin which serves as the series' original soundtrack. The album was made in response to several requests to play the show's theme song in various Philippine radio stations. The album includes the series' theme song "Ikaw Nga" by South Border.

== Accolades ==
Accolades received by Mulawin
Year	Award	Category	Recipient	Result	Ref.
2005	Golden Screen TV Awards	Outstanding Drama Series	Mulawin	Nominated	
2005	Golden Screen TV Awards	Outstanding Director for a Drama Series	Dominic Zapata Lorenzo Reyes	Nominated	
2005	Golden Screen TV Awards	Outstanding Lead Actor in a Drama Series	Richard Gutierrez	Nominated	
2005	Golden Screen TV Awards	Outstanding Lead Actress in a Drama Series	Angel Locsin	Nominated	
2005	Golden Screen TV Awards	Outstanding Supporting Actor in a Drama Series	Dennis Trillo	Nominated	
2005	Golden Screen TV Awards	Outstanding Supporting Actress in a Drama Series	Amy Austria	Nominated	

== Sequels ==
A direct sequel to the series, the film Mulawin: The Movie was produced by Regal Entertainment and GMA Films. It was released in theaters on December 25, 2005, as an entry to the 2005 Metro Manila Film Festival. A continuation of the film, the television series Mulawin vs. Ravena premiered on GMA Network on May 22, 2017.
