= List of Indio characters =

The following is a list of major, recurring, notable and minor characters appeared in Indio, a Filipino historical drama-epic fantasy series created and developed by Suzette Doctolero and produced by GMA Network. It executive produced by Meann P. Regala and directed by Dondon Santos. The series premiered on January 14, 2013, on GMA Telebabad block, and January 15, 2013, worldwide via GMA Pinoy TV. It concluded its twenty weeks run on May 31, 2013, with the total of ninety-seven episodes.

== Major characters ==
The series features eleven main characters throughout its run.

=== Malaya / Simeon / Indio ===
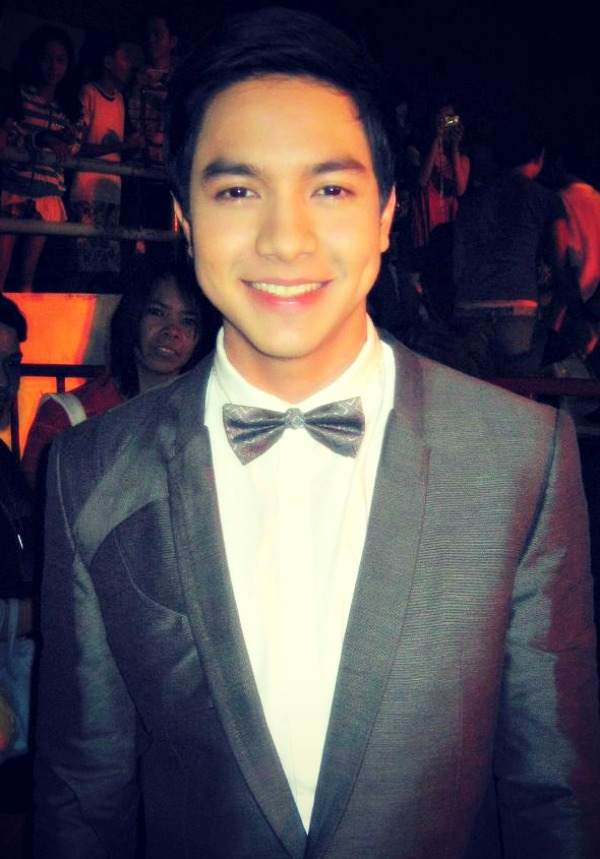
Alden Richards portrays Young Adult Malaya / Simeon / Indio

Portrayed by Bong Revilla, he is the show's main protagonist and also, the demigod son of Ynaguiguinid, a goddess of war, and Hangaway, a native warrior. As a demigod, he possesses godly powers and immense superhuman strength that truly makes him the destined savior of both his fellow Filipinos and diwatas from the Spanish colonists. The character is also portrayed by Vincent Magbanua and Alden Richards in the first part of the show. GMA Network's vice president for Entertainment TV, Lilybeth G. Rasonable said that "Indio was really made for him [Revilla]." Revilla finds his very first television series "exciting but very challenging" and went through rigorous acting trainings under director Laurice Guillen and Pen Medina for his preparation for the role. He also did some readings and research regarding Philippine history because "even though it is a fictional show, it has some historical undertones that should at least have some sense of accuracy."

=== Esperanza Sanreal ===
Portrayed by Jennylyn Mercado, she is a Mestiza and the estranged illegitimate daughter of Juancho Sanreal with Maria, a native Filipina he raped. She eventually falls in love with Simeon/Malaya, her father's slave and later, formidable nemesis.

=== Señor Juancho Sanreal ===
Portrayed by Michael de Mesa, he is the show's main antagonist. Juancho is the son of Antonio Sanreal, a lieutenant under conquistador Miguel Lopez de Legazpi. He is the domineering husband of Victoria and the estranged father of Esperanza. Juancho was trained by his father to be a despotic encomendero like him to put the subjugated natives under control. Juancho rules the encomienda with an iron fist, determined to take down anyone who dares to get in his way. Juancho adopted and raised Simeon/Malaya to use his incredible powers and abilities for his own personal gain. The character was also played by Lucho Ayala in the first part of the series.

=== Dian Magayon ===
Portrayed by Rhian Ramos, the goddess of wind and all flying creatures. Magayon serves as the protector and mentor of Malaya/Simeon throughout his journey to fulfill destiny. The character also serves as the narrator (in voice-over) of the show

=== Señora Victoria Hidalgo de Sanreal ===
Portrayed by Jackie Lou Blanco, she is a peninsulares and the sterile wife of Juancho Sanreal. Her bitter nature turns her into an intolerable shrew. She deeply loathes Esperanza for being her husband's daughter from another woman. The character was initially played by Nathalie Hart as the young version of the character.

=== Hernando Pelaez ===
Portrayed by Chinggoy Alonzo, he is a peninsular who serves as the right-hand man of Juancho Sanreal. Hernando is a tough-looking man with noble virtues, but he is constantly torn between his conscience and his unfathomable loyalty to Juancho. Bobby Andrews portrayed the younger version of the character in the first part of the series.

=== Tarong and Linang ===
Portrayed by Dante Rivero and Daria Ramirez respectively, they are a childless native couple who adopted and raised young Malaya/Simeon as their child. Eventually, they are blessed with another child named Mayang. The characters were first portrayed by Jomari Yllana and Agot Isidro, respectively, in the early part of the series.

=== Cosme de los Santos ===
Portrayed by Robert Arevalo, he is the loving and protective father of Rosa. He works as both a fisherman and a sacristan of Jacobe, an Augustinian friar. In secret, he is a member of a rebel organization which aims to free their land from the colonists. Cosme is strongly against Rosa's relationship with Simeon because of his affiliation with Juancho Sanreal, seeing him as the biggest obstacle for the group's objective of freeing their land from the Spaniards.

=== Mayang ===
Portrated by Sheena Halili, she is the care-free and tomboyish daughter of Tarong and Linang. However, her adventurous nature eventually leads her to fall into the hands of bandits called mangangayaw and then the Spaniards. Her journey eventually brought her to her adoptive brother, Simeon/Malaya.

=== Elena Decena ===
Portrayed by Vaness del Moral, she is the daughter of Alicia, Rosa's cousin. In order to pay for her parents' debt, she works as a maidservant to Sanreal's household during which she becomes close friends with Esperanza Sanreal. She eventually becomes a hapless victim of Juancho's lustful advances.

=== Tuhay / Cesario ===
Portrayed by Dominic Roco, he is a native warrior who hates Simeon and love-interest of Mayang. When his village was attacked by the Spaniards, he becomes an auxiliary soldier in their service and eventually, he becomes a Babaylan when the natives revolted. Actor Rocco Nacino was originally cast as Tuhay but later replaced by Roco for the said role.

== Other characters ==
=== Native Filipinos ===
- Waray Lupig (Ronnie Lazaro), the chieftain of the tribe in which Tarong, Linang and Mayang belong.
- Hangaway (Luis Alandy), a native warrior who was Ynaguiguinid's husband and Malaya/Simeon's biological father. He was killed when the conquistadors first arrived in the Philippines. The character appeared only in the pilot episode.
- Uray Tale and Melinda (Aura Mijares and Glenda Garcia, respectively). Uray Tale is a babaylan who helped Simeon/Malaya unravel the truth behind Rosa's death. Both Uray Tale and her apprentice Melinda are killed by Juancho Sanreal after they refused to help him get Simeon's powers. Both characters appeared several times in the series.
- Labug (Leandro Baldemor), a native chieftain, he was Tuhay's father who was killed by Hernando.
- Upeng (Eunice Lagusad), Mayang's friend from Ilaya.
- Liway (Donna Claire Galvez), she is the adopted sister of Bagandi and playmate to António.
- Aswagi (King Gutierrez), a native bandit leader who plot to kidnap Esperanza and kill Simeon'/Malaya, only to die in his hands.
- Humawig (Gerald Ejercito), one of Aswagi's who is killed by Simeon/Malaya.
- Dalusaw (June Hidalgo), one of Aswagi's henchman who is also killed by Simeon/Malaya.
- Bagandi (Aljur Abrenica), a native warrior who joins a group of rebels after being dispossessed by the ruthless Spaniards under Juancho Sanreal. The character first appeared in the penultimate episode of the first part and eventually, he becomes one of the main characters in the second part of the show.

=== Christianized Filipinos ===
- Rosa delos Santos (Maxene Magalona), she is Cosme's daughter and Simeon/Malaya's childhood friend and first love interest. Because of her involvement with Simeon, she is eventually killed by Juancho Sanreal in secret in order to keep Simeon free from any attachments as it will weaken him. The character was also played by Jillian Ward and Bea Binene in the first part of the series. The said role had previously been offered to Sunshine Cruz but the actress turned down the offer.
- Datu (Mon Confiado), there is father of Burigadang Pada Sinaklang Bulawan
- María (Wynwyn Marquez), the native woman who was raped by Juancho Sanreal, becoming the biological mother of Esperanza in the process. She was eventually killed by Juancho during her failed attempt to kill him for ruining her life. The character appeared several times in the first part of the series (episodes 6, 7 and 8).
- António (Marc Justin Alvarez), named after his maternal great grandfather, António is the son of Simeon/Malaya and Esperanza. Like his father, António is also a demigod. The character appears in the show's second part. In the finale episode, the character was eventually played by Rafael Rosell as an adult.
- Juaning and Pedro (Mike Nacua and John Feir, respectively), Simeon/Malaya's friends who provide comic relief throughout the show.
- Pancho and Alicia Decena (Dan Alvaro and Melissa Mendez, respectively), the loving parents of Elena. They witnessed the harsh fate of Maria in the hands of Juancho Sanreal, without any idea that it is the same fate that their daughter would have. Pancho was killed by Juancho.
- Diego de Dios (Ping Medina), Elena Decena's childhood friend who bears an unrequited love for her.
- Kardo (Neil Ryan Sese), a Filipino rebel who dies in a battle against the Spaniards. The character appeared only on the second episode of the show.
- Tamblot (Ervic Vijandre), a babaylan from Bohol who led an uprising against the spread of the Catholic faith.
- Francisco Dagohoy (Gian Magdangal), a native from Bohol who led the longest known rebellion in Philippine history. The character appeared in the last episode of the series.
- Diego Silang and Gabriela Silang (JC Tiuseco and Kris Bernal, respectively), a rebel couple from Ilocos who both conspired with the British forces to overthrow the Spaniards during their short occupation of Manila in the Seven Years' War.
- Andrés Bonifacio (Jolo Revilla), the founder and Supremo ("supreme leader") of the Katipunan, a rebel organization formed to liberate the Philippines from Spanish colonial rule. The character appears in the show's finale.

=== Diwata and Deities ===
- Magwayen (Isabelle Daza), the goddess who guides the dead to Sulad (land of the dead). The character appeared in episodes 37 and 38 during Simeon/Malaya's journey to Sulad.
- Makaptan (Roi Vinzon), the god of hunger and poverty, and also, the supreme god who dwells in the sky. In the story, Malaya/Simeon confronts him in a violent showdown. The character appeared in episodes 39 and 40.
- Burigadang Pada Sinaklang Bulawan (Katrina Halili), the goddess of greed and vengeance. When her only brother was killed by Simeon, she becomes a staunch ally of the Spaniards in an attempt to get her revenge on him. This served as Halili's comeback project after a year of hiatus from showbiz.
- Sidapa (Ryan Eigenmann), the god of death and Burigadang Pada Sinaklang Bulawan's closest ally who first appeared in the show's 64th episode. In an interview, Eigenmann said that his character is "a little bit tricky since he is not totally evil. In fact, even if he is the god of death, he wants to be fair to everyone. However, a twist in the story, which will be revealed in the coming weeks, will change all that."
- Uray (Anita Linda), the old blind woman whom Malaya/Simeon met and helped during his journey on the way to Makaptan's realm. In the 40th episode, it is revealed that she is actually Makaptan's trusted servant.
- Paiburong (Mike Gayoso), the god of the middle world and Burigadang Pada Sinaklang Bulawan's brother who is accidentally killed by Simeon/Malaya.
- Pandaki (Gwen Zamora), the goddess of life and guardian of Sulad.
- Makabosog (Alfred Marquez), the god of gluttony. He is one of Burigadang Pada Sinaklang Bulawan's allies.
- 'Alunsina' (Joyce Ching), the goddess of the eastern skies who owns a magical flute that can bring anyone to deep sleep, paralyze, or even death. The flute she owns is coveted by Bagandi who needs to take it from her to win Magayon's love. The character appeared in episodes 84, 85 and 86.
- Ynaguiguinid (Sarah Lahbati), she is the goddess of war, Hangaway's wife, and Malaya/Simeon's biological mother. She sacrificed her own life to save her son by passing down her powers to him. The character appeared only in the pilot episode.
- Libulan (Rachelle Ann Go), the goddess of the moon.
- Lisuga (Diana Zubiri), She is the Goddess of the stars and Constellations. She serves as Simeon's guide to a safe path for day and night. She disguises herself as a meteor whenever she meets with Simeon.
- Dalikmata (Ellen Adarna), the goddess of visions and prophecies.
- Liadlaw (Paolo Paraiso), the god of the sun.
- Ribung Linti (Steven Silva), the god of thunder.
- Barangaw (Will Devaughn), the god of rainbows.
- Santonilyo (Kyle Jimenez), the child-like god of blessings and good fortune.
- Lihangin (Ehra Madrigal), the goddess of air.
- Lidagat (Sam Pinto), the goddess of the seas.
- Magayon (Rhian Ramos), the goddess of all flying animals and simeon's guide.

=== Spaniards ===
- Gobernador-General (Joko Diaz), the primary representative of the Spanish monarch tasked with ruling the Philippines for Spain. In the show's finale, he leads an expedition to reconquer the regions liberated by Filipino rebels under Malaya/Simeon.
- Mariano Alfonso (Carlos Morales). Mariano is a Spanish noble man and soldier from Manila who falls in love with Esperanza Sanreal after Juancho arranged their marriage to save her reputation.
- Frayle Jacobe, Frayle Lazaro, Frayle Gustavo (Jon Achaval), they are the kind-hearted Augustinians friars and the parish curates (kura paroko) of the encomienda's local church.
- Isabel Alfonso (Ryza Cenon), an insulares, she is the supportive younger sister of Mariano Alfonso who strongly opposes her brother's engagement to Esperanza. Isabel meets and eventually falls in love with Fernando without even knowing that she is actually Mayang in disguise.
- Javier Crisanto (Marco Alcaraz), a Spanish militia commander and a trusted ally of Juancho Sanreal.
- António Sanreal (Ramon Christopher), a ruthless encomendero and the equally despotic father of Juancho Sanreal. The character appeared only in the first week.
- Miguel López de Legazpi (Mark Gil), a conquistador who established one of the first Spanish settlements in the East Indies in 1565. He was also the first Governor-General of the Philippines. The character appeared only in the pilot.
