= List of Ang Dalawang Mrs. Real episodes =

Ang Dalawang Mrs. Real is a 2014 Philippine television drama romantic series broadcast by GMA Network. It premiered on the network's Telebabad line up from June 2, 2014 to September 19, 2014, replacing Rhodora X.

Mega Manila ratings are provided by AGB Nielsen Philippines.

== Series overview ==
| Month | Episodes | Monthly Averages |
| Month | Episodes | Mega Manila |
|---|---|---|
| June 2014 | 21 | 17.1% |
| July 2014 | 23 | 20.6% |
| August 2014 | 21 | 23.6% |
| September 2014 | 15 | 24.4% |
| Total | 80 | 21.4% |

== Episodes ==
=== June 2014 ===
| Episode | | Original air date | Social Media Hashtag | AGB Nielsen Mega Manila Households in Television Homes | | | Ref. |
| Episode | | Original air date | Social Media Hashtag | Rating | Timeslot Rank | Primetime Rank | Ref. |
|---|---|---|---|---|---|---|---|
| 1 | Pilot | June 2, 2014 | #AngDalawangMrsReal | 18.5% | #2 | #8 | |
| 2 | The Misunderstanding | June 3, 2014 | #MrsRealTheMisunderstanding | 16.7% | #2 | #10 | |
| 3 | The Real Serendipity | June 4, 2014 | #TheRealSerendipity | 16.1% | #2 | #11 | |
| 4 | Anthony Real: Fight or Flight? | June 5, 2014 | #AnthonyRealFightOrFlight | 15.8% | #2 | #11 | |
| 5 | Kung ako si Anthony Real | June 6, 2014 | #KungAkoSiAnthonyReal | 15.3% | #2 | #11 | |
| 6 | Anthony Real Status: Taken | June 9, 2014 | #AnthonyRealStatusTaken | 15.1% | #2 | #9 | |
| 7 | In the Name of Real Love | June 10, 2014 | #InTheNameOfRealLove | 16.7% | #2 | #10 | |
| 8 | The Real Conflict | June 11, 2014 | #TheRealConflict | 16.4% | #2 | #10 | |
| 9 | The Real Problem | June 12, 2014 | #TheRealProblem | 16.3% | #2 | #11 | |
| 10 | Lagot ang Dalawang Real | June 13, 2014 | #LagotAngDalawangReal | 15.8% | #2 | #10 | |
| 11 | The Real Deal | June 16, 2014 | #TheRealDeal | 18.5% | #2 | #9 | |
| 12 | Ang Galit ni Papang | June 17, 2014 | #AngGalitNiPapang | 16.8% | #2 | #10 | |
| 13 | Ang Desisyon ni Anthony Real | June 18, 2014 | #AngDesisyonNiAnthonyReal | 15.3% | #2 | #10 | |
| 14 | Marry me, Anthony Real | June 19, 2014 | #MarryMeAnthonyReal | 17.3% | #2 | #9 | |
| 15 | Truth Hurts, Anthony Real | June 20, 2014 | #TruthHurtsAnthonyReal | 18.8% | #2 | #8 | |
| 16 | Ang Tunay na Mrs. Real sa Cebu | June 23, 2014 | #AngTunayNaMrsRealSaCebu | 18.1% | #2 | #8 | |
| 17 | Sheila Meets Millet | June 24, 2014 | #SheilaMeetsMillet | 19.2% | #1 | #7 | |
| 18 | Huli ka, Anthony Real! | June 25, 2014 | #HuliKaAnthony | 17.6% | #2 | #9 | |
| 19 | One Ring, Two Weddings | June 26, 2014 | #OneRingTwoWeddings | 18.2% | #2 | #9 | |
| 20 | Kasal Sakal | June 27, 2014 | #KasalSakal | 17.7% | #2 | #7 | |
| 21 | The Real Proof | June 30, 2014 | #TheRealProof | 19.9% | #1 | #5 | |

=== July 2014 ===
| Episode | | Original air date | Social Media Hashtag | AGB Nielsen Mega Manila Households in Television Homes | | | Ref. |
| Episode | | Original air date | Social Media Hashtag | Rating | Timeslot Rank | Primetime Rank | Ref. |
|---|---|---|---|---|---|---|---|
| 22 | Real friend ka ba, Sandy? | July 1, 2014 | #RealFriendKaBaSandy | 18.6% | #1 | #7 | |
| 23 | Iwas Tukso | July 2, 2014 | #IwasTukso | 20.2% | #2 | #7 | |
| 24 | Sampal ni Millet | July 3, 2014 | #SampalNiMillet | 18.3% | #1 | #5 | |
| 25 | The Real Doubt | July 4, 2014 | #TheRealDoubt | 21.0% | #1 | #6 | |
| 26 | Suspetsa ni Shiela | July 7, 2014 | #SuspetsaNiShiela | 18.1% | #1 | #7 | |
| 27 | Alam na ni Shiela | July 8, 2014 | #AlamNaNiShiela | 21.9% | #1 | #4 | |
| 28 | The Real Truth | July 9, 2014 | #TheRealTruth | 18.5% | #1 | #6 | |
| 29 | 2nd Real Meeting | July 10, 2014 | #2ndRealMeeting | 22.8% | #1 | #3 | |
| 30 | Sampal kay Mr. Real | July 11, 2014 | #SampalKayMrReal | 20.3% | #1 | #5 | |
| 31 | The Real Guilt | July 14, 2014 | #TheRealGuilt | 21.5% | #1 | #5 | |
| 32 | 2nd Real Son | July 15, 2014 | #2ndRealSon | 20.1% | #1 | #7 | |
| 33 | Ang Bagong Real | July 16, 2014 | #AngBagongReal | 10.0% | #1 | #4 | |
| 34 | Pagsisisi ng Ama | July 17, 2014 | #PagsisisiNgAma | 13.5% | #1 | #5 | |
| 35 | Torn Between 2 Sons | July 18, 2014 | #TornBetween2Sons | 18.0% | #1 | #3 | |
| 36 | Real Family Album | July 21, 2014 | #RealFamilyAlbum | 19.5% | #1 | #4 | |
| 37 | Alam na ni Millet | July 22, 2014 | #AlamNaNiMillet | 17.7% | #1 | #6 | |
| 38 | Huli ka, Anthony! | July 23, 2014 | #HuliKaAnthony | 21.1% | #1 | #4 | |
| 39 | Sugod, Millet! | July 24, 2014 | #SugodMillet | 24.6% | #1 | #3 | |
| 40 | Room 211 | July 25, 2014 | #Room211 | 25.9% | #1 | #1 | |
| 41 | Bagyong Millet | July 28, 2014 | #BagyongMillet | 24.3% | #1 | #2 | |
| 42 | Face Off 2 Mrs. Real | July 29, 2014 | #FaceOff2MrsReal | 26.4% | #1 | #1 | |
| 43 | Real Sakit at Pait | July 30, 2014 | #RealSakitAtPait | 24.2% | #1 | #2 | |
| 44 | Ang Tunay o Pangalawa | July 31, 2014 | #AngTunayOPangalawa | 26.2% | #1 | #3 | |

=== August 2014 ===
| Episode | | Original air date | Social Media Hashtag | AGB Nielsen Mega Manila Households in Television Homes | | | Ref. |
| Episode | | Original air date | Social Media Hashtag | Rating | Timeslot Rank | Primetime Rank | Ref. |
|---|---|---|---|---|---|---|---|
| 45 | Ibalik kay Mrs. Real | August 1, 2014 | #IbalikKayMrsReal | 26.6% | #1 | #1 | |
| 46 | The Real Regret | August 4, 2014 | #TheRealRegret | 22.3% | #1 | #4 | |
| 47 | The Real Separation | August 5, 2014 | #TheRealSeparation | 22.3% | #1 | #4 | |
| 48 | Resbak ni Papang | August 6, 2014 | #ResbakNiPapang | 22.5% | #1 | #3 | |
| 49 | Patawad, Millet | August 7, 2014 | #PatawadMillet | 24.9% | #1 | #2 | |
| 50 | Layas, Sheila! | August 8, 2014 | #LayasSheila | 23.7% | #1 | #3 | |
| 51 | Bagong Millet | August 11, 2014 | #BagongMillet | 23.2% | #1 | #4 | |
| 52 | The Real Ring | August 12, 2014 | #TheRealRing | 22.4% | #1 | #4 | |
| 53 | Lamat sa Tiwala | August 13, 2014 | #LamatSaTiwala | 21.9% | #1 | #4 | |
| 54 | Real Mother's Love | August 14, 2014 | #RealMothersLove | 23.6% | #1 | #3 | |
| 55 | Kapakanan ng Anak | August 15, 2014 | #KapakananNgAnak | 24.5% | #1 | #3 | |
| 56 | Ang Muling Paghaharap | August 18, 2014 | #AngMulingPaghaharap | 23.6% | #1 | #1 | |
| 57 | Round 4: Millet vs. Shiela | August 19, 2014 | #Round4MilletVsShiela | 24.3% | #1 | #2 | |
| 58 | The Real Conflict | August 20, 2014 | #TheRealConflict | 23.4% | #1 | #3 | |
| 59 | Sumbat ni Millet | August 21, 2014 | #SumbatNiMillet | 24.3% | #1 | #3 | |
| 60 | Sakit ng Katotohanan | August 22, 2014 | #SakitNgKatotohanan | 24.0% | #1 | #3 | |
| 61 | Biyenan Wars | August 25, 2014 | #BiyenanWars | 22.0% | #1 | #4 | |
| 62 | Suspetsa ni Henry | August 26, 2014 | #SuspetsaNiHenry | 23.6% | #1 | #4 | |
| 63 | Higanti ni Henry | August 27, 2014 | #HigantiNiHenry | 26.0% | #1 | #1 | |
| 64 | The Real Revenge | August 28, 2014 | #TheRealRevenge | 24.5% | #1 | #4 | |
| 65 | Real Second Chance | August 29, 2014 | #RealSecondChance | 21.9% | #1 | #6 | |

=== September 2014 ===
| Episode | | Original air date | Social Media Hashtag | AGB Nielsen Mega Manila Households in Television Homes | | | Ref. |
| Episode | | Original air date | Social Media Hashtag | Rating | Timeslot Rank | Primetime Rank | Ref. |
|---|---|---|---|---|---|---|---|
| 66 | Kasong Bigamy | September 1, 2014 | #KasongBigamy | 23.8% | #1 | #4 | |
| 67 | Maawa ka, Henry | September 2, 2014 | #MaawaKaHenry | 25.0% | #1 | #3 | |
| 68 | Away Biyenan | September 3, 2014 | #AwayBiyenan | 25.8% | #1 | #1 | |
| 69 | The Real Threat | September 4, 2014 | #TheRealThreat | 21.0% | #1 | #4 | |
| 70 | Nawawala si Tonton | September 5, 2014 | #NawawalaSiTonton | 25.5% | #1 | #3 | |
| 71 | Finding Tonton | September 8, 2014 | #FindingTonton | 23.4% | #1 | #4 | |
| 72 | Real Broken Family | September 9, 2014 | #RealBrokenFamily | 23.8% | #1 | #4 | |
| 73 | Tuloy ang Kaso | September 10, 2014 | #TuloyAngKaso | 23.6% | #1 | #4 | |
| 74 | The Real Consequence | September 11, 2014 | #TheRealConsequence | 22.2% | #1 | #4 | |
| 75 | Sa Hirap at Ginhawa | September 12, 2014 | #SaHirapAtGinhawa | 25.8% | #1 | #3 | |
| 76 | Ikulong si Anthony | September 15, 2014 | #IkulongSiAnthony | 23.9% | #1 | #3 | |
| 77 | Rambol sa Cebu | September 16, 2014 | #RambolSaCebu | 24.2% | #1 | #3 | |
| 78 | Masakit na Paalam | September 17, 2014 | #MasakitNaPaalam | 26.4% | #1 | #2 | |
| 79 | The Real Punishment | September 18, 2014 | #TheRealPunishment | 24.8% | #1 | #3 | |
| 80 | The Real Ending | September 19, 2014 | #TheRealEnding | 26.8% | #1 | #2 | |
