= Pinulot Ka Lang sa Lupa =

2017 Philippine television drama series

- Title card
- Also known as: Envy
- Genre: Drama
- Based on: Pinulot Ka Lang sa Lupa (1987) by Ishmael Bernal
- Developed by: Gilda Olvidado-Marcelino
- Written by: Marlon G. Miguel; John Kenneth de Leon; Honey Hidalgo
- Directed by: Gina Alajar
- Creative director: Roy Iglesias
- Starring: Julie Anne San Jose; Benjamin Alves
- Theme music composer: Arlene Calvo
- Opening theme: "Pag-ibig 'Di Lumisan" by Julie Anne San Jose
- Country of origin: Philippines
- Original language: Tagalog
- No. of episodes: 53

Production
- Executive producer: Jocelyn del Rosario-Ariño
- Production locations: Quezon City, Philippines
- Editors: Jen Sablaya; Nikka Olayvar-Unson; Debbie Robete; Arthuro Damaso; Julius Castillo
- Camera setup: Multiple-camera setup
- Running time: 22–30 minutes
- Production company: GMA Entertainment TV

Original release
- Network: GMA Network
- Release: January 30 – April 12, 2017

Pinulot Ka Lang sa Lupa (transl. you were just picked up from the ground / international title: Envy) is a 2017 Philippine television drama series broadcast by GMA Network. The series is based on a Philippine graphic novel and a 1987 Philippine film of the same title. Directed by Gina Alajar, it stars Julie Anne San Jose and Benjamin Alves. It premiered on January 30, 2017 on the network's Afternoon Prime line up. The series concluded on April 12, 2017, with a total of 53 episodes.

The series is streaming online on YouTube.

== Premise ==
Santina is forced to work after the death of her aunt. She will work for Diony who eventually sends Santina to school and treats her like a daughter. Diony will later adopt Angeli leading Santina and Angeli to vie for Diony's son, Ephraim's love.

== Cast and characters ==
Cast

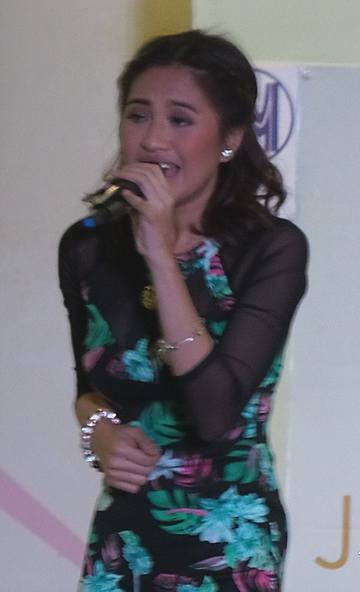
Julie Anne San Jose

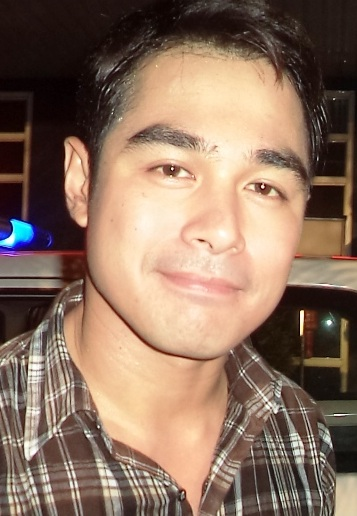
Benjamin Alves

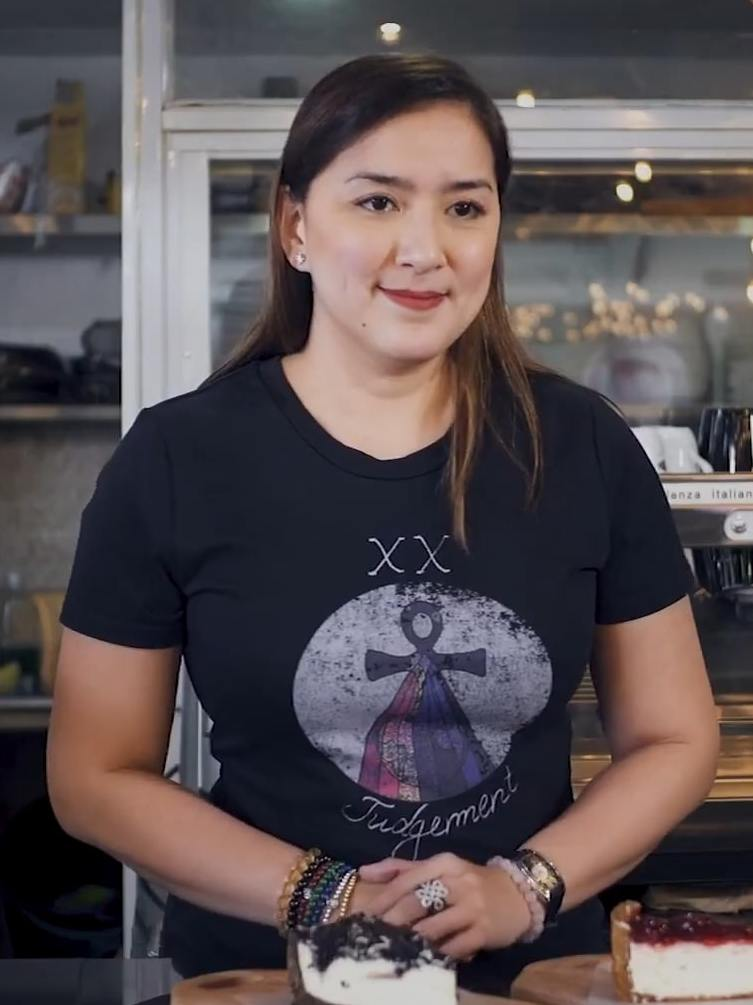
Ara Mina

Lead cast

- Julie Anne San Jose as Santina "Tina" Marquez-Esquivel
- Benjamin Alves as Ephraim Sta. Maria Esquivel

Supporting cast

- Martin del Rosario as Francisco "Francis / Kiko" Garela
- LJ Reyes as Angeli "Geli" Martinez / Esquivel
- Ara Mina as Mariz Alejo-Zimmerman
- Jean Garcia as Diony Sta. Maria-Esquivel
- Victor Neri as Cesar Esquivel
- Allan Paule as Hector Marquez
- Geleen Eugenio as Yoleng Sta. Maria
- Janna Dominguez as Chona Garela
- Lharby Policarpio as Boggs
- Koreen Medina as Laureen

Guest cast

- Kyle Ocampo as younger Geli
- Marc Justin Alvarez as younger Ephraim
- Ar Angel Aviles as younger Tina
- Candy Pangilinan as Liza Marquez
- Leanne Bautista as Glenda Esquivel
- Elle Ramirez as Macy Montenegro
- Kiko Matos as Manny Sotto
- Eunice Lagusad as Elma
- Carmen Del Rosario as Lydia
- Leandro Baldemor as Conrad Alejo
- Sheree as Arlene Garela-Alejo
- Afi Africa as Britney
- Gee Canlas as Siony
- Prince Clemente as Ephraim's friend
- Joemarie Nielsen as Ephraim's friend
- Eian Rances as Ephraim's friend
- Kim Rodriguez as Julie
- David Licauco as Aiden
- Ge Villamil as Maring

== Ratings ==
Pinulot Ka Lang sa Lupa ratings
No.	Original air date	AGB Nielsen NUTAM
1	January 30, 2017	11.4%
2	January 31, 2017	9.8%
3	February 1, 2017	10.6%
4	February 2, 2017	11.3%
5	February 3, 2017	11.5%
6	February 6, 2017	12.1%
7	February 7, 2017	11.0%
8	February 8, 2017	10.4%
9	February 9, 2017	10.5%
10	February 10, 2017	11.0%
11	February 13, 2017	9.4%
12	February 14, 2017	10.1%
13	February 15, 2017	10.5%
14	February 16, 2017	11.4%
15	February 17, 2017	10.4%
16	February 20, 2017	10.4%
17	February 21, 2017	11.7%
18	February 22, 2017	11.0%
19	February 23, 2017	9.5%
20	February 24, 2017	10.7%
21	February 27, 2017	10.6%
22	February 28, 2017	11.0%
23	March 1, 2017	10.8%
24	March 2, 2017	11.6%
25	March 3, 2017	10.9%
26	March 6, 2017	10.8%
27	March 7, 2017	10.4%
28	March 8, 2017	10.7%
29	March 9, 2017	10.3%
30	March 10, 2017	10.3%
31	March 13, 2017	
32	March 14, 2017	
33	March 15, 2017	
34	March 16, 2017	
35	March 17, 2017	
36	March 20, 2017	
37	March 21, 2017	
38	March 22, 2017	
39	March 23, 2017	
40	March 24, 2017	
AGB Nielsen NUTAM People
41	March 27, 2017	5.0%
42	March 28, 2017	5.3%
43	March 29, 2017	5.0%
44	March 30, 2017	4.9%
45	March 31, 2017	5.5%
46	April 3, 2017	5.4%
47	April 4, 2017	5.1%
48	April 5, 2017	5.9%
49	April 6, 2017	5.9%
50	April 7, 2017	5.8%
51	April 10, 2017	5.4%
52	April 11, 2017	5.6%
53	April 12, 2017	5.4%

== Production ==
Principal photography commenced on September 30, 2016. Filming concluded on April 6, 2017.

== Accolades ==
Accolades received by Pinulot Ka Lang sa Lupa
Year	Award	Category	Recipient	Result	Ref.
2017	31st PMPC Star Awards for Television	Best Child Performer	Marc Justine Alvarez	Nominated	
