= One Day Isang Araw =

2013 Philippine television drama series

- Title card
- Genre: Fantasy drama
- Created by: Senedy Que
- Starring: Jillian Ward; Milkcah Wynne Nacion; Marc Justine Alvarez; Joshua Uy
- Country of origin: Philippines
- Original language: Tagalog
- No. of episodes: 23

Production
- Executive producer: Helen Santiago-Benito
- Camera setup: Multiple-camera setup
- Running time: 23–36 minutes
- Production company: GMA Entertainment TV

Original release
- Network: GMA Network
- Release: June 15 – November 16, 2013

One Day Isang Araw (transl. one day one day) is a 2013 Philippine television drama fantasy anthology series broadcast by GMA Network. Created and developed by Senedy Que, it stars Jillian Ward, Milkcah Wynne Nacion, Joshua Uy and Marc Justine Alvarez. It premiered on June 15, 2013 on the network's Sabado Star Power sa Gabi line up. The series concluded on November 16, 2013, with a total of 23 episodes.

The series is streaming online on YouTube.

== Premise ==
Daisy, Uno, Isang and Sunny are friends. A tree house is their hangout where they meet up every week for storytelling sessions. They share stories of situations and characters they interact with.

== Cast and characters ==
=== Lead cast ===
- Jillian Ward as Daisy

A former city girl who moved into the province to be with her grandmother. She is an intelligent eight-year-old girl who is also a fashion enthusiast and trendy. Daisy loves the idea of storytelling and wants to become a princess.

- Joshua Uy as Juan or Uno

A seven-year-old boy who loves creating /designing toys using recycled materials. He gets along well with Daisy, but at times they clash due to his "hostile" nature.

- Milkcah Wynne Nacion as Isang

Comes from a lower-class family. She is an eight-year-old girl who is fond of watching TV, particularly teledramas, wherein she finds inspiration while clinging to her belief that these programs mirror her own life.

- Marc Justine Alvarez as Sunny

An eight-year-old boy who comes from a well-off family. Sunny loves toys and gadgets. He practically owns the "tree house" which eventually becomes the favorite hangout place of the group for their storytelling sessions.

=== Recurring cast ===
- Camille Prats as Arlene, Daisy's mother
- Gloria Romero as Gracia, Daisy's grandmother
- Bobby Andrews as Jun, Sunny's father
- Miggy Jimenez and Nomer Limatog as Isang's older brothers

== Notable episodes ==
No.	Title	Directed by	Written by	Original release date	AGB Nielsen rating
1	"Blueford Santos the Great"	Blueford Santos	Blueford Santos	June 15, 2013	13.35%
The first story tells of a little rich girl named Katkat (Jillian Ward) who is known for her arrogance and mean-spited nature. She gets a dose of her own medicine when a dwarf curses and transforms her into a beggar. The episode also starred Gloria Romero and Camille Prats.
2	"Jason and His Toys"	Mark Reyes	Venj Pellena	June 22, 2013	15.5%
The story revolves around Jason (Marc Justine Alvarez), a boy who always wants the newest and latest toys. One day, his parents unknowingly left him inside a toy store. Unknown to Jason every toys in that toy store come alive at night. The episode also starred Aljur Abrenica, Carlene Aguilar and Neil Ryan Sese.
3	"Boots' Cat"	Roderick Lindayag	Augie Rivera	June 29, 2013	16.7%
The story centers on a little boy named Boots. Boots hates cats and if he finds them in the yard, he yells and throws them away. Until one day, he encountered a magical cat who cursed him and turned him into a cat. The episode also starred Angelu de Leon, Antonio Aquitania and John Feir.
4	"Lola Labs"	Ricky Davao	Cel Santiago	July 6, 2013	14.4%
A story about a little girl named Belle (Milkcah Nacion) and her Grandma Labs (Luz Fernandez). Belle is a grandma’s girl and she loves her granny very dearly. But fate makes a drastic turn when Grandma Labs starts to show signs of dementia. The episode also starred Gabby Eigenmann, Isabel Oli and Arthur Solinap.
5	"Gamer Girl"	Lore Reyes	Jules Katanyag	July 13, 2013	13.4%
The story revolves around Daisy's aunt (Valerie Concepcion), and cousin (Bianca Umali) who are always busy on the computer. Daisy's cousin, who is a video game addict, thrives to be one of the best gamers in the world, but her plans are crushed when her mother grounds her over a conflict of power and computer usage in the house. Daisy wants the three of them to spend less time on the computer and more time together. Supporting cast: Bianca Umali, Jhoana Marie Tan, Mikoy Morales, TJ Trinidad, Carmi Martin, John Arcilla, and Valerie Concepcion.
6	"Plants and Zombies"	Rico Gutierrez	Venj Pellena	July 20, 2013	15.7%
Chuck (Joshua Uy) learns how to appreciate and respect mother nature after he was being chased by zombies. The episode also starred Candy Pangilinan and Paolo Contis.
7	"Billy, the Bully"	Dondon Santos	Agnes Gagelonia-Uligan	July 27, 2013	16.9%
The episode centers on a young boy named Monching, who loves dancing but is being forced to learn Taekwondo. Adding pressure to Monching is Billy and his bully friends who keep taunting him for being different. They even call him names and tease him as being "gay". At the end of the story, Monching not only learns to fight back, but he also learns why kids like Billy become bullies. It turns out that Billy is being bullied by his abusive father. The episode also starred LJ Reyes, Mike Tan and Carl Acosta as Billy, the bully.

== Ratings ==
According to AGB Nielsen Philippines' Mega Manila household television ratings, the pilot episode of One Day Isang Araw earned a 13.1% rating. The final episode scored a 17.4% rating.

== Accolades ==
Accolades received by One Day Isang Araw
Year	Award	Category	Recipient	Result	Ref.
2013	27th PMPC Star Awards for Television	Best Horror-Fantasy Program	One Day Isang Araw	Nominated	
