= List of Indio episodes =

The following is a list of episodes for Indio, a Filipino historical drama-epic fantasy television series, created and developed by Suzette Doctolero and produced by GMA Network. It premiered on January 14, 2013 on GMA Telebabad block. It concluded its twenty weeks run on May 31, 2013 with the total of ninety-seven episodes. The series features Ramon "Bong" Revilla, Jr. playing the title role, with Jennylyn Mercado, Michael de Mesa, Maxene Magalona and Rhian Ramos. It executive produced by Meann P. Regala and directed by Dondon Santos.

The series chronicles the life of Malaya/Simeon/Indio who rises from a lowly slave to a demigod on his quest for freedom from the Spanish Crown. With its high production value and powerhouse cast, the series is regards as a "telemovie" or a movie made for television and dubbed as the most expensive series of the network for 2013. The series is considered as a "ratings success" from its premiere telecast and have also received positive reviews both from viewers and critics.

== Plot ==
In order to save her newborn son from certain doom, Ynaguiginid—the goddess of war—is forced to sacrifice her own immortality. Safe and alone in the forest under the watchful eyes of Magayon, the deity of flying creatures, Ynaguiginid's child is rescued by a native couple who name him Malaya. As Malaya grows up he manifests god-like powers which were inherited from his mother. His powers are witnessed by the villagers and Malaya is eventually looked upon as their savior.

However, as Spanish conquerors descend upon the land, Malaya is captured and enslaved. Years gone by and Malaya—now called Simeon—will have witnessed how terribly the Spaniards mistreat his countrymen. No longer able to bear the suffering and pain of his people, he is roused by Magayon of his true purpose. Simeon must fulfil his destiny to fight off the Spanish invaders and liberate his country.

== Main cast ==
- Sen. Ramon "Bong" Revilla, Jr. as Malaya/Simeon/Indio
- Jennylyn Mercado as Esperanza Sanreal
- Rhian Ramos as Dian Magayon
- Michael de Mesa as Señor Juancho Sanreal

== Series overview ==
Season	Episodes	Originally released	
Season	Episodes	First released	Last released
1	50	January 14, 2013	March 22, 2013
2	47	March 25, 2013	May 31, 2013

== List of episodes ==
=== Book 1 ===
No.	Title	Original release date
1	"The Beginning"	January 14, 2013
2	"The Beginning"	January 15, 2013
3	"The Beginning"	January 16, 2013
4	"The Beginning"	January 17, 2013
5	"The Beginning"	January 18, 2013
The pilot episode shows followed by the death of Amaya and Bagani, and show how the natives and the gods and goddesses live together in peace and harmony until Spanish conquistadors came and slew the people of the tribes they captured believing that the land is rich in gold minerals. Goddess of war, Ynaguiguinid (Sarah Lahbati), who have fallen in love and chosen to marry a warrior tribesman lives with their newborn child, a demigod. The warrior was killed during a battle with the Spaniards. In return, the soldiers met a violent backlash from Ynaguiginid. Despite Ynaguiguinid's power, she was overcome by her opponents and injured from battle. She was later saved when Diwata Magayon distracted the remaining Spaniards. In an effort to save her child, Ynaguiginid transferred all her supernatural powers to the child resulting to her own death. The child was later found and raised by a native couple, Tarong and Linang (Jomari Yllana and Agot Isidro, respectively), who named the child Malaya.
6	"The Separation"	January 21, 2013
7	"The Separation"	January 22, 2013
8	"The Separation"	January 23, 2013
9	"The Separation"	January 24, 2013
10	"The Separation"	January 25, 2013
As a demigod, Malaya's supernatural abilities, incredible strength and invulnerability increased steadily as he grew up. By the help of Magayon, the goddess of all flying creatures, Malaya found out who he really was, his roots and the ultimate task he must fulfill – which is to save and protect the commoners from the abuses of the Spanish colonial government. An unfortunate turn of events had led to the separation of Malaya from his adoptive parents. He finds himself under the custody of Juancho Sanreal, a despotic encomendero. Upon discovering the child's extraordinary abilities and seeing him as a great asset in fulfilling his dream of becoming a Governor-General, Juancho adopts Malaya, gives him a new name – Simeon.
11	"Torn between Love and Obligation"	January 28, 2013
12	"Torn between Love and Obligation"	January 29, 2013
13	"Torn between Love and Obligation"	January 30, 2013
14	"Torn between Love and Obligation"	January 31, 2013
15	"Torn between Love and Obligation"	February 1, 2013
Many years have passed. Simeon maintains a strong relationship and unrelenting devotion for Juancho. But this is also the reason why Rosa (Maxene Magalona), Simeon's childhood sweetheart and girlfriend, turned down Simeon's marriage proposal, as she wants to have a simple and peaceful family life – which, for her, is impossible to happen as long as Simeon is under the despotic encomendero's power. Meanwhile, Esperanza, Juancho's illegitimate daughter, returns to encomienda to finally be with her estranged father.
16	"Rosa's Death"	February 4, 2013
17	"Rosa's Death"	February 5, 2013
18	"Rosa's Death"	February 6, 2013
19	"Rosa's Death"	February 7, 2013
20	"Rosa's Death"	February 8, 2013
Rosa will die in the hands of Juancho Sanreal. Esperanza sees it but chooses to keep quiet about it. Simeon/Malaya wants to avenge the death of his beloved but Magayon warns him that he will commit a mistake. Victoria, the wicked stepmother of Esperanza, tries to poison the mind of Juancho about Simeon. Goddesses Lalahon (Solenn Heussaff) and Lihangin (Ehra Madrigal) interfere in a fight in Ilaya that annoys Simeon. The diwatas explain to him he should return to where he comes from to learn the truth.
21	"The Truth"	February 11, 2013
22	"The Truth"	February 12, 2013
23	"The Truth"	February 13, 2013
24	"The Truth"	February 14, 2013
25	"The Truth"	February 15, 2013
Both emotional and guilt-ridden, Simeon and Esperanza find solace in each other and share a romantic night together. Day after... with the help of Uray Tale (Aura Mijares), a babaylan (priestess), Simeon unraveled the truth behind Rosa's death and who is the responsible for her death.
26	"Sufferings"	February 18, 2013
27	"Sufferings"	February 19, 2013
28	"Sufferings"	February 20, 2013
29	"Sufferings"	February 21, 2013
30	"Sufferings"	February 22, 2013
Simeon was captured and tortured by the suldados (Spanish soldiers). Juancho then asked Simeon to give him all his powers. Simeon later sentenced to death (dragged by horses).
31	"Simeon's Death"	February 25, 2013
32	"Simeon's Death"	February 26, 2013
33	"Simeon's Death"	February 27, 2013
34	"Simeon's Death"	February 28, 2013
35	"Simeon's Death"	March 1, 2013
Juancho Sanreal succeeded in killing Simeon/Malaya after he was dragged by horses. But with the help of the Diwatas, he leaves with Esperanza their child in her womb. Lidagat, gets Simeon's body and asks the help of the other Diwatas to revive him. But his soul has to travel first to Sulad (heaven), land of the dead, where he's fetched by Lihangin who then takes him to Sulad where he sees his dead sweetheart, Rosa.
36	"Soul's Journey"	March 4, 2013
37	"Soul's Journey"	March 5, 2013
38	"Soul's Journey"	March 6, 2013
39	"Soul's Journey"	March 7, 2013
40	"Soul's Journey"	March 8, 2013
It's not easy for Simeon to live again as he has first to defeat the fierce Makaptan (Roi Vinzon), the supreme god. Meantime, Esperanza's pregnancy becomes noticeable and the priest says it's the product of the devil.
41	"Malaya's Resurrection"	March 11, 2013
42	"Malaya's Resurrection"	March 12, 2013
43	"Malaya's Resurrection"	March 13, 2013
44	"Malaya's Resurrection"	March 14, 2013
45	"Malaya's Resurrection"	March 15, 2013
In his resurrection, Malaya finally embraces his mission [which is to save and protect his fellow Indios from the abuses of the Spanish colonial government] and vows that he will stop at nothing until he restores peace and freedom to his beloved land. He also reunites with his long-lost parents, Tarong and Linang. Meanwhile, Juancho forces his daughter, Esperanza to marry Mariano Sebastian (Carlos Morales). After the wedding ceremony, Esperanza gives birth to a beautiful baby boy.
46	"The Return"	March 18, 2013
47	"The Return"	March 19, 2013
48	"The Return"	March 20, 2013
49	"The Return"	March 21, 2013
50	"The Return"	March 22, 2013
Esperanza was shocked with the fast growth of her beloved son Antonio—from infant to an eight-year-old boy. But all her worries and doubts are gone when Santonillo (Kyle Jimenez), the god of blessings, appears and explain what is happening to her son Meanwhile, to avoid intrigues and to protect their reputation, Juancho makes it appear that Antonio is his adopted son. On the other hand, Malaya/Simeon returns to Ilawod (lowland) to start his mission. He joins and later, hailed as the new head of the insurrectos (a group of rebel Indios).

=== Book 2 ===
No.	Title	Original release date
51	"New Found Ally"	March 25, 2013
52	"New Found Ally"	March 26, 2013
53	"New Found Ally"	March 27, 2013
Malaya/Simeon and the insurrectos have found a new ally—Bagandi, a native warrior—in their fight against the Spanish colonial government.
54	"A Gift or A Curse?"	April 1, 2013
55	"A Gift or A Curse?"	April 2, 2013
56	"A Gift or A Curse?"	April 3, 2013
57	"A Gift or A Curse?"	April 4, 2013
58	"A Gift or A Curse?"	April 5, 2013
Malaya/Simeon was devastated upon learning that Esperanza is already married and realizes his true feelings for the young lady. On the other hand, the insurrectos started to set their plan into action. Meanwhile, Césario/Tuhay (Dominic Roco) finally embraces his fate as a male babaylan, and now possesses not only the healing ability, but also to see things that were going to happen.
59	"Unmasked"	April 8, 2013
60	"Unmasked"	April 9, 2013
61	"Unmasked"	April 10, 2013
62	"Unmasked"	April 11, 2013
63	"Unmasked"	April 12, 2013
After the bloody fight between Simeon/Malaya and Juancho Sanreal, the former realized how impossible for him to defeat his formidable nemesis without a single power. Meanwhile, upon learning that Simeon is still alive, Mariano Alfonso volunteers himself to help to capture Simeon and the rest of insurrectos.
64	"The Quest for Power"	April 15, 2013
65	"The Quest for Power"	April 16, 2013
66	"The Quest for Power"	April 17, 2013
67	"The Quest for Power"	April 18, 2013
68	"The Quest for Power"	April 19, 2013
For him to be able to gain powers, Malaya/Simeon must battle and defeat Paiburong (Mike Gayoso), the lord of the middle world, and get his fang [which will serve as his anting-anting or amulet]. And he did! Meanwhile, Burigadang Pada Sinaklang Bulawan (Katrina Halili)—the goddess of greed and vengeance; and the sister of Paiburong—enters and vows to avenge her brother's death.
69	"One Tragic Night"	April 22, 2013
70	"One Tragic Night"	April 23, 2013
71	"One Tragic Night"	April 24, 2013
72	"One Tragic Night"	April 25, 2013
73	"One Tragic Night"	April 26, 2013
Simeon/Malaya finally meets his son, Antonio (Marc Justin Alvarez). Meanwhile, Burigadang Pada Sinaklang Bulawan bents on a new revenge plot and joins forces with Juancho Sanreal. This alliance eventually result a tragic end for the insurrectos.
74	"Coming Home"	April 29, 2013
75	"Coming Home"	April 30, 2013
76	"Coming Home"	May 1, 2013
77	"Coming Home"	May 2, 2013
78	"Coming Home"	May 3, 2013
After the tragic end of his group, Simeon/Malaya, together with Esperanza—who chose to stay with him—and son Antonio, return to Ilaya (highland). Tarong gladly welcomed them. On the other hand, Elena is back to Pueblo and begins to put her plan of revenge into action. A platoon of Spanish soldiers led by Juancho attacked the hideout of the native rebels. Armed with only their spears and shields, the natives, led by Simeon/Malaya, defeated the Spaniards despite the latter's heavy artillery. Esperanza came out of their hut to find out what had just happened. But as soon as she stepped out, Juancho cornered her and her son Antonio. Simeon later learned that his wife and son are in grave danger. He figured that it was Juancho who abducted his family and he's determined to take them back. Simeon thought that the only way to find out where Juancho hid his family is to threatening the commandant's wife Victoria. Simeon broke into Victoria's home and forced the First Lady to speak up. Unfortunately, latter doesn't know either. Simeon sought the help of the diwatas, but despite their supernatural powers, they were unable to determine the location of the hostages. Magayon proposed that they wait for the abductors to state their demands and act accordingly only thereafter. However, Simeon, worrying about his wife and son, refused to wait and give in to the demands of the captors. He insisted on searching for his family despite the risk.
79	"Juancho's Demands"	May 6, 2013
80	"Juancho's Demands"	May 7, 2013
81	"Juancho's Demands"	May 8, 2013
82	"Juancho's Demands"	May 9, 2013
83	"Juancho's Demands"	May 10, 2013
Simeon came face to face with the evil god Sipada (Ryan Eigenmann) who was with Simeon's Spanish arch-enemy Juancho Sanreal. Simeon told Juancho that he was willing to do everything to take back his family. Juancho gave Simeon a condition—he wants Simeon to go against and kill all the diwatas who are on his side. Simeon refused to yield to Juancho's demands. Magayon appeared to Simeon and asked him what Juancho's demands were. Simeon did not tell her about Juancho's demands. Simeon gathered his fellow native soldiers and planned another attack against the Spaniards in the pueblo, particularly against Juancho. Simeon's plan is to make Juancho pay for his misdeeds. One night, Simeon gave the go-signal to commence the attack against the Spanish soldiers guarding the pueblo.
84	"In the Name of Love"	May 14, 2013
85	"In the Name of Love"	May 15, 2013
86	"In the Name of Love"	May 16, 2013
87	"In the Name of Love"	May 17, 2013
For her to be able to control Malaya/Simeon [who is under the spell of Burigadang Pada Sinaklang Bulawan], Magayon curses him—a curse that eventually breaks Esperanza's heart. Meanwhile, Bagandi dares to do anything and everything just to prove his love for Magayon.
88	"Juancho's Unsuccessful Attempt"	May 20, 2013
89	"Juancho's Unsuccessful Attempt"	May 21, 2013
90	"Juancho's Unsuccessful Attempt"	May 22, 2013
91	"Juancho's Unsuccessful Attempt"	May 23, 2013
92	"Juancho's Unsuccessful Attempt"	May 24, 2013
Juancho, together with Mariano, once again attempt to destroy Malaya/Simeon, but their efforts are sabotaged by the diwatas. Meanwhile, Esperanza finally discovered [through Elena] the real story about the tragic fate of her mother in the hands of Juancho. She confronts her father but the latter denies everything and asks Esperanza to trust him.
93	"The Fulfillment of Fate"	May 27, 2013
94	"The Fulfillment of Fate"	May 28, 2013
95	"The Fulfillment of Fate"	May 29, 2013
96	"The Fulfillment of Fate"	May 30, 2013
97	"The Fulfillment of Fate"	May 31, 2013
Even if Malaya/Simeon has finally ended Juancho's life, it doesn't seem to be the end of his troubles, as the battalions of Spanish soldiers led by the Governor-General (Joko Diaz) arrived to conquer the land again. Armed with heavy artilleries, the Spaniards rout the native warriors and capture Malaya. The Governor-General forces Malaya to surrender his powers, but instead, Malaya chooses to give them away to the Diwatas — which caught the ire of the Governor-General and slays him. The battle for peace and freedom continues years, decades and centuries after Malaya's death, with the new breed of brave Indios. The finale episode ends with Magayon (in her eagle form) flying freely across the sky.
