= Ang Dalawang Mrs. Real =

2014 Philippine television drama series

- Title card
- Also known as: The Other Mrs. Reals
- Genre: Romantic drama
- Created by: Geng Delgado
- Written by: Lei Chavez; Paul Sta. Ana; Jason Lim
- Directed by: Andoy Ranay
- Creative director: Jun Lana
- Starring: Dingdong Dantes; Lovi Poe; Maricel Soriano
- Theme music composer: Rebel Magdagasang; Janno Gibbs
- Opening theme: "Ikaw, Ako at Siya" by Janno Gibbs, Jaya and Julie Anne San Jose
- Country of origin: Philippines
- Original languages: Tagalog; Cebuano
- No. of episodes: 80 (list of episodes)

Production
- Executive producer: Nieva Sabit
- Production locations: Quezon City, Philippines; Cebu City, Philippines
- Camera setup: Multiple-camera setup
- Running time: 21–42 minutes
- Production company: GMA Entertainment TV

Original release
- Network: GMA Network
- Release: June 2 – September 19, 2014

Ang Dalawang Mrs. Real (transl. the two Mrs. Reals / international title: The Other Mrs. Reals) is a 2014 Philippine television drama romance series broadcast by GMA Network. Directed by Andoy Ranay, it stars Dingdong Dantes, Lovi Poe and Maricel Soriano. It premiered on June 2, 2014, on the network's Telebabad line up. The series concluded on September 19, 2014, with a total of 80 episodes.

The series is streaming online on YouTube.

== Premise ==
Anthony Real, the husband of Millet meets Shiela who he will eventually marry. Caught in a bigamous relationship, Anthony's wives will eventually find out the truth that they aren't Anthony's only wife which will lead to repercussions into their lives.

== Cast and characters ==
Cast

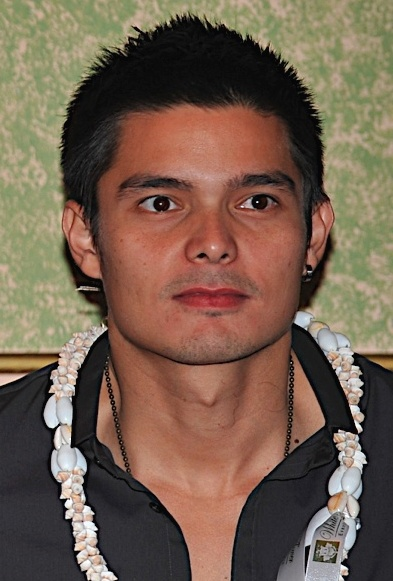
Dingdong Dantes

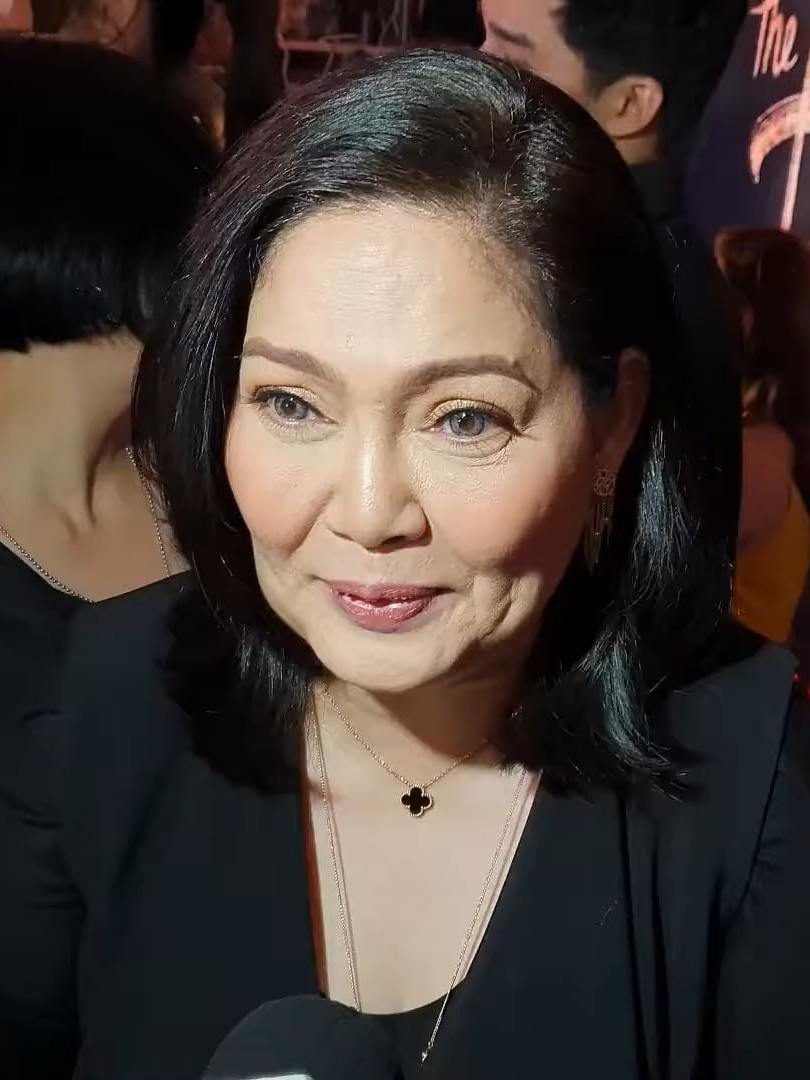
Maricel Soriano

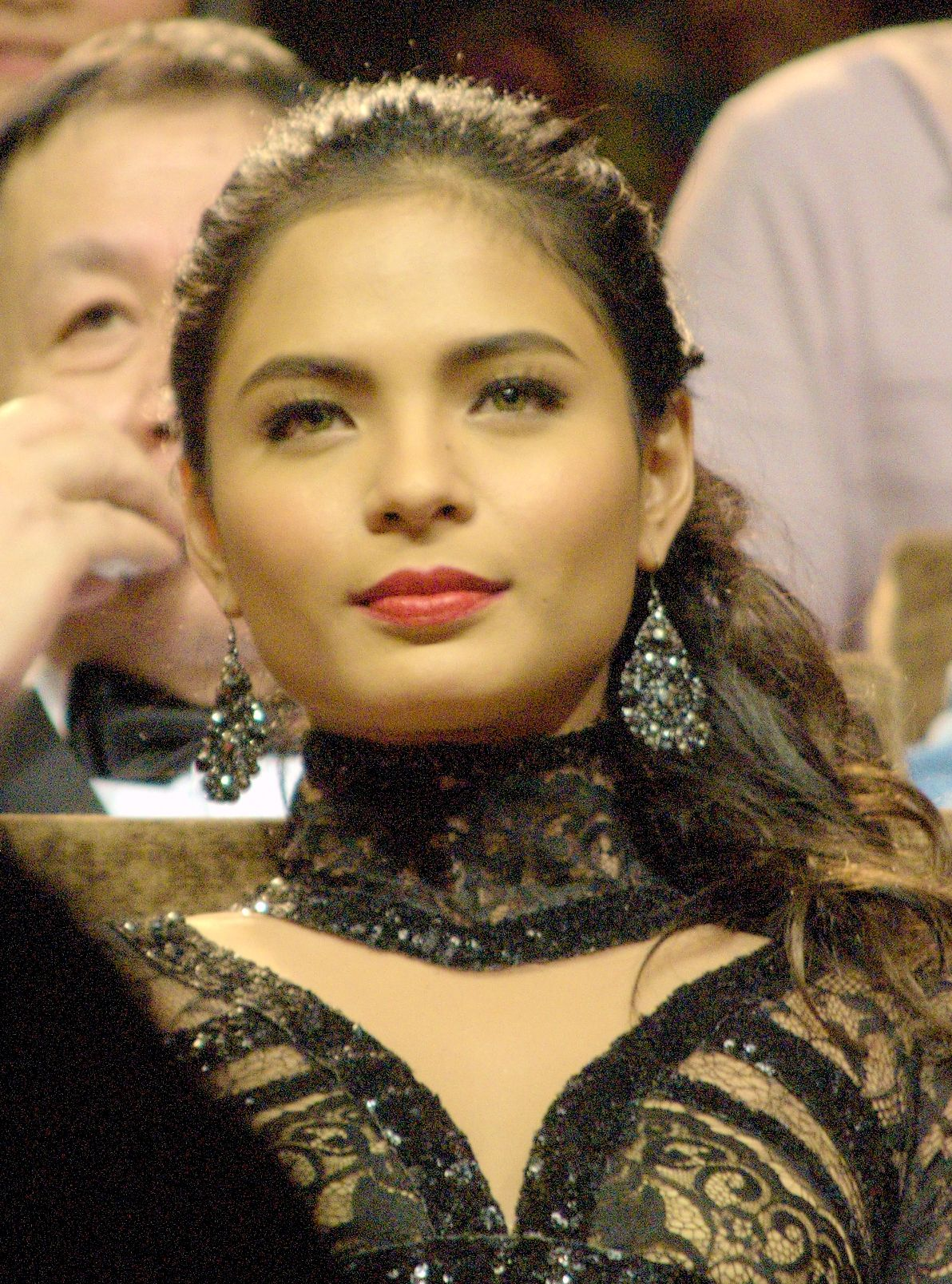
Lovi Poe

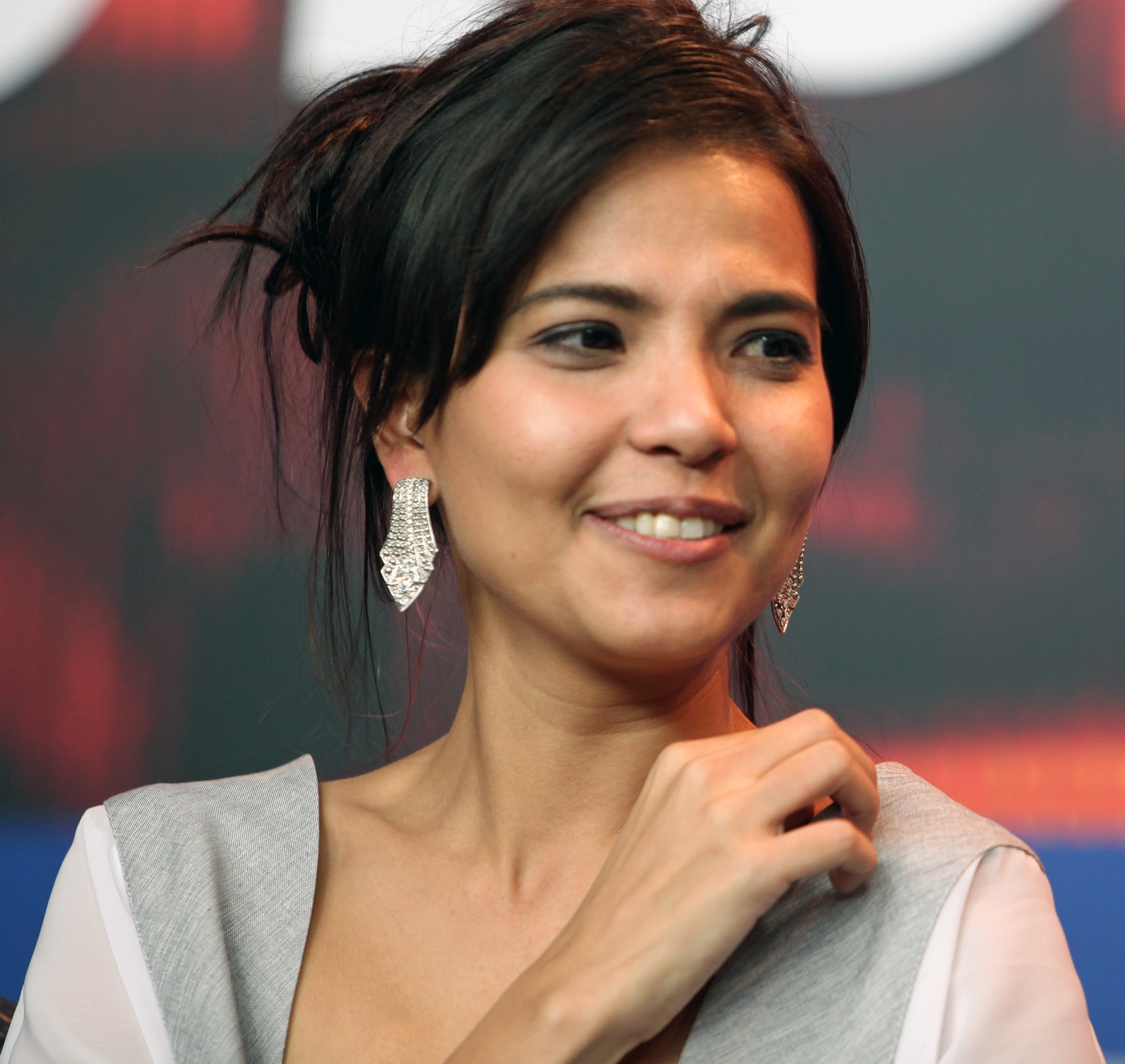
Alessandra De Rossi

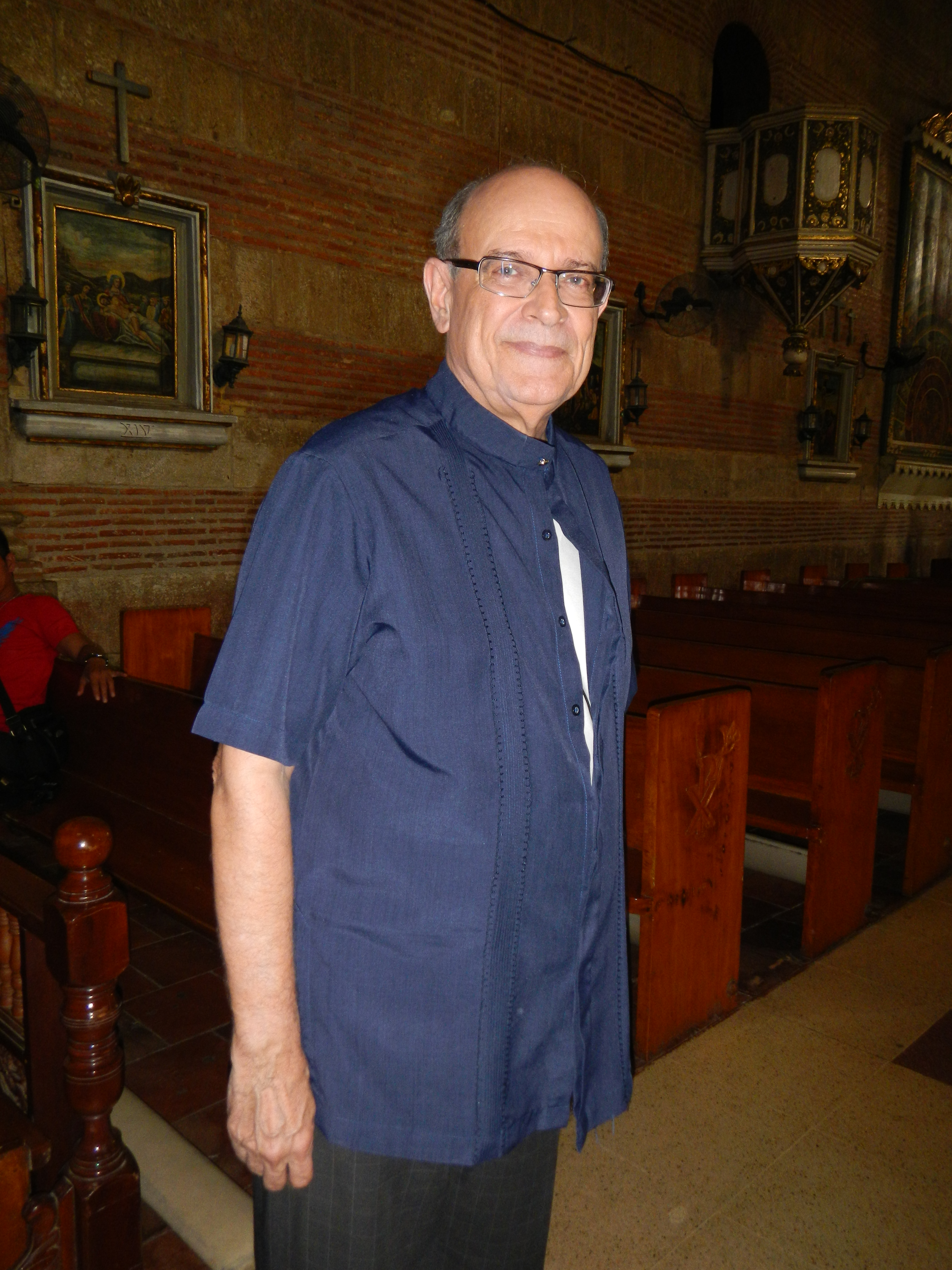
Jaime Fabregas

Lead cast

- Dingdong Dantes as Juan Antonio "Anthony" V. Real III
- Lovi Poe as Sheila Salazar-Real
- Maricel Soriano as Carmelita "Millet" Gonzales-Real

Supporting cast

- Robert Arevalo as Henry Gonzales
- Celeste Legaspi as Aurora Gonzales
- Tommy Abuel as Justino "Tino" Salazar, Sheila's father
- Alessandra De Rossi as Sandy A. Dumlao
- Jaime Fabregas as Juan Antonio "Jun" Real II
- Susan Africa as Salome "Umeng" Salazar
- Dominic Roco as Daniel "Dado" Salazar
- Rodjun Cruz as Allan V. Real
- Marc Abaya as Vincent Dumlao
- Marc Justine Alvarez as Juan Antonio "Tonton" G. Real IV
- Coney Reyes as Sonia Villanueva-Real

Recurring cast

- Diva Montelaba as Liza P. Salazar
- Ashley Cabrera as Abby Delos Reyes
- Marco Alcaraz as Edgar Cruz
- Aicelle Santos as Mae

Guest cast

- Frances Makil-Ignacio as Marife D. Salazar
- Ina Feleo as Lydia San Jose
- Dolly de Leon as Felisa San Jose
- Fonz Deza as Gusting Salazar
- Angie Ferro as Rosa Salazar
- Menggie Cobarrubias as Isabelo Delos Reyes
- Robert Seña as Jimmy

== Production ==
Principal photography commenced in April 2014.

== Ratings ==
According to AGB Nielsen Philippines' Mega Manila household television ratings, the pilot episode of Ang Dalawang Mrs. Real earned an 18.5% rating. The final episode scored a 26.8% rating, which is the series' highest rating.

== Accolades ==
Accolades received by Ang Dalawang Mrs. Real
Year	Award	Category	Recipient	Result	Ref.
2014	28th PMPC Star Awards for Television	Best Primetime Drama Series	Ang Dalawang Mrs. Real	Nominated	
2014	28th PMPC Star Awards for Television	Best Drama Actor	Dingdong Dantes	Nominated	
2014	28th PMPC Star Awards for Television	Best Drama Actress	Maricel Soriano Lovi Poe	Nominated	
2014	28th PMPC Star Awards for Television	Best Child Performer	Marc Justin Alvarez	Nominated	
2015	Golden Screen TV Awards	Outstanding Original Drama Program	Ang Dalawang Mrs. Real	Won	
2015	Golden Screen TV Awards	Outstanding Performance by an Actor in a Drama Program	Dingdong Dantes	Won	
2015	Golden Screen TV Awards	Outstanding Performance by an Actress in a Drama Program	Maricel Soriano Lovi Poe	Won	
2015	Golden Screen TV Awards	Outstanding Performance by an Actress in a Drama Program	Maricel Soriano Lovi Poe	Nominated	
2015	Golden Screen TV Awards	Outstanding Supporting Actress in a Drama Program	Alessandra de Rossi	Won	
2015	Golden Screen TV Awards	Outstanding Supporting Actor in a Drama	Tommy Abuel	Nominated	
2015	US Intl Film and Video Festival 2015	Silver Screen Award - Broadcast/Cable/Satellite/Online: Telenovelas	Ang Dalawang Mrs. Real	Won	
