= Indio (TV series) =

2013 Philippine television drama series

- Title card
- Genre: Historical drama; Epic fantasy
- Created by: Suzette Doctolero
- Written by: Suzette Doctolero; Geng Delgado; Jason Lim; Marlon Miguel
- Directed by: Dondon Santos
- Creative director: Jun Lana
- Starring: Bong Revilla
- Theme music composer: Von de Guzman; Vim Nadera
- Opening theme: "Lupang Payapa" by Gian Magdangal
- Ending theme: "Indio theme"
- Country of origin: Philippines
- Original language: Tagalog
- No. of episodes: 97 (list of episodes)

Production
- Executive producer: Meann P. Regala
- Production locations: Pagsanjan, Laguna; Subic, Zambales; Bolinao, Pangasinan; Tanay, Rizal
- Cinematography: David Siat
- Editors: Eddie Esmedia; Robert Ryan Reyes; Noel Mauricio II
- Camera setup: Multiple-camera setup
- Running time: 19–52 minutes
- Production company: GMA Entertainment TV

Original release
- Network: GMA Network
- Release: January 14 – May 31, 2013

Indio is the 2013 Philippine television drama epic fantasy series broadcast by GMA Network. Directed by Dondon Santos, it stars Bong Revilla in the title role. It premiered on January 14, 2013 on the network's Telebabad line up. The series concluded on May 31, 2013, with a total of 97 episodes.

The series is streaming online on YouTube.

== Cast and characters ==
Cast

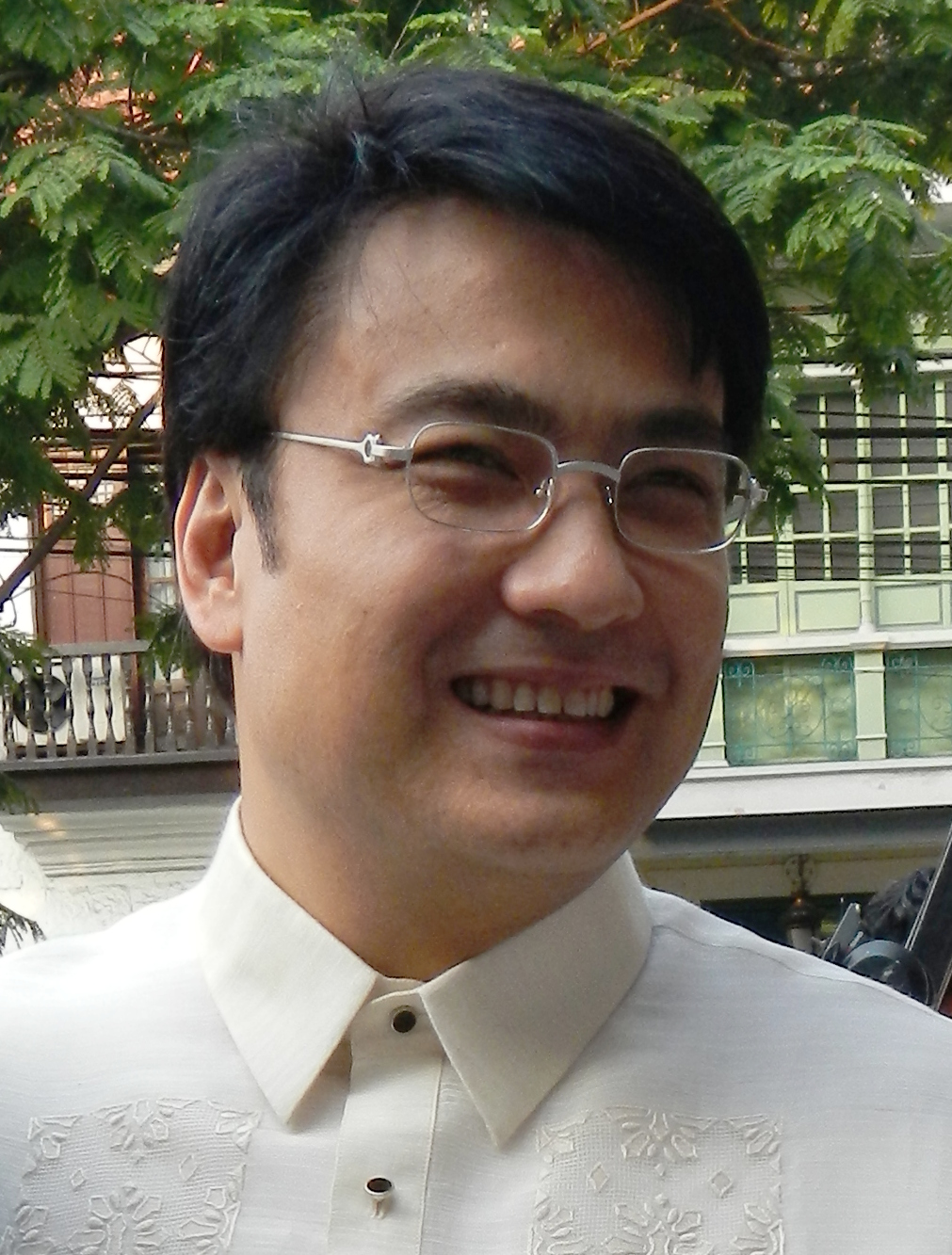
Bong Revilla, Jr.

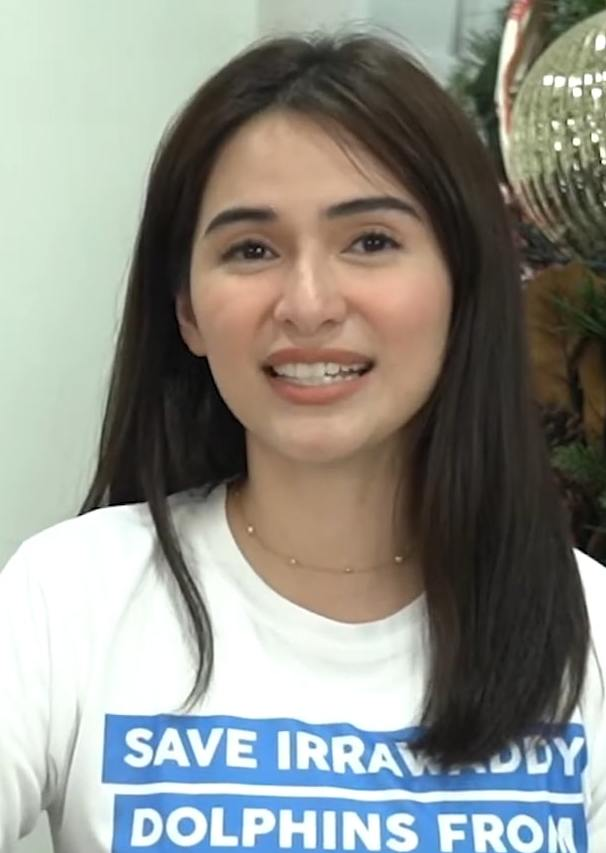
Jennylyn Mercado

Lead cast

- Bong Revilla as Malaya / Simeon / Indio

Supporting cast

- Jennylyn Mercado as Esperanza Sanreal
- Michael de Mesa as Juancho Sanreal
- Rhian Ramos as Dian Magayon
- Jackie Lou Blanco as Victoria Hidalgo de Sanreal
- Chinggoy Alonzo as Hernando Pelaez
- Dante Rivero as Tarong
- Daria Ramirez as Linang
- Robert Arevalo as Cosme de los Santos
- Sheena Halili as Mayang / Fernando
- Vaness del Moral as Elena Decena
- Dominic Roco as Tuhay / Cesario
- Sam Pinto as Lidagat
- Solenn Heussaff as Lalahon
- Ehra Madrigal as Lihangin
- Rachelle Ann Go as Libulan
- Kyle Jimenez as Santonilyo
- Will Devaughn as Barangaw
- Paolo Paraiso as Liadlaw
- Steven Silva as Ribung Linti

Recurring cast

- Pekto as Juaning
- John Feir as Pedro
- Marco Alcaraz as Javier Crisanto
- Gwen Zamora as Pandaki
- Ellen Adarna as Dalikmata
- Isabelle Daza as Magwayen
- Carlos Morales as Mariano Alfonso
- Ryza Cenon as Isabel Alfonso
- Aljur Abrenica as Bagandi
- Marc Justine Alvarez as Antonio
- Katrina Halili as Burigadang Pada Sinaklang Bulawan

Guest cast

- Sarah Lahbati as Ynaguiguinid
- Vincent Magbanua as younger Indio
- Jomari Yllana as younger Tarong
- Agot Isidro as younger Linang
- Lucho Ayala as younger Juancho Sanreal
- Ramon Christopher as Antonio Sanreal
- Mark Gil as Miguel López de Legazpi
- Bobby Andrews as younger Hernando Pelaez
- Nathalie Hart as younger Hidalgo de Sanreal
- Alden Richards as teenage Indio
- Jillian Ward as younger Rosa delos Santos
- Maxene Magalona as older Rosa
- Winwyn Marquez as Maria
- Roi Vinzon as Makaptan
- Anita Linda as Uray
- Mike Gayoso as Paiburong
- Ryan Eigenmann as Sidapa
- Alfred Marquez as Makabosog
- Diana Zubiri as Lisuga
- Joyce Ching as Alunsina
- Joko Diaz as a governor general
- Rafael Rosell as older Antonio
- Jolo Revilla as Andrés Bonifacio

== Development ==
"It is the first word that comes into our minds when we talk about Spanish colonization here [in the Philippines]. It mirrors every Filipino. With this series, I want to turn this label into something dignified and a source of pride.""
— Series' creator, Suzette Doctolero on the title Indio

The series was developed in early 2012 by screenwriter, Suzette Doctolero (the writer behind such epic series as Encantadia, Etheria: Ang Ikalimang Kaharian ng Encantadia and Amaya) and under the supervisions of historians: Dr. Vic Villan of the University of the Philippines Diliman (who was also the consultant for Amaya) and Dr. Rolando Borrinaga; and GMA Entertainment TV creative heads, Jake Tordesillas and Jun Lana. The idea for series was conceived during the time Doctolero did her research on Amaya. According to her, the series is a combination of Philippine history and Filipino mythology. The show's staged in pre-colonial to Spanish colonial period setting (1565–1663). Regarding the title "Indio" –which was a label intended to be a badge of imposed by the Spanish on the natives— Doctolero stated that "It is the first word that comes into our minds when we talk about Spanish colonization here [in the Philippines]. It mirrors every Filipino. With this series, I want to turn this label into something dignified and a source of pride." GMA Network assigned Dondon Santos to helm the series. The series is his first project for the network. Historians Vic Villan and Rolando Borrinaga were hired to ensure the accuracy of the series.

=== Casting ===
Headed the series' cast is Bong Revilla who plays the titular character. GMA Network's vice president for Entertainment TV, Lilybeth G. Rasonable said that "Indio was really made for him." Revilla finds his very first television series "exciting but very challenging" and described it as "a movie but done for TV". The actor-politician went through rigorous acting trainings under director Laurice Guillen for his preparation for the role. He also gets Phillip Salvador to be his acting coach. He also did some readings and research regarding Philippine history because "even though it is a fictional show, it has some historical undertones that should at least have some sense of accuracy." Actor Alden Richards signed on to play the teenage version of the title character while Vincent Magbanua auditioned and successfully cast as the younger Malaya. In March 2012, actresses Jennylyn Mercado and Rhian Ramos were announced to be Revilla's two of three love interests. In August 2012, Maxene Magalona was added to the cast, wherein her role had previously been offered to Sunshine Cruz. Sheena Halili was chosen to play a role in the series. Rocco Nacino was originally cast as Tuhay but later replaced by Dominic Roco. Michael de Mesa and Jackie Lou Blanco were signed on to portray the antagonist roles of Juancho and Victoria Sanreal. Other casts were all announced during the series' story conference, held in GMA Network Center, the same month of 2012.

The cast of characters grew over the course of the series. Some of the notable actors, that appeared and portrayed important characters, were Mark Gil, Ramon Christopher, Aljur Abrenica, Katrina Halili and Ryan Eigenmann. Gil played Miguel López de Legazpi, the very first governor-general of the Philippines, while Ramon Christopher played António Sanreal, father of the main antagonist, Juancho Sanreal. Both characters appeared only on the pilot week. Abrenica acted as Bagandi, the brave native warrior who became an ally to Simeon/Malaya. First appeared on the penultimate episode of the first chapter, Abrenica became one of the prominent casts in the second chapter of the show. Katrina Halili played the antagonist Burigadang Pada Sinaklang Bulawan, the goddess of greed and vengeance, while Eigenmann played Sidapa, the god of death. In an interview, Eigenmann described his character as "a little bit tricky since he is not totally evil. In fact, even if he is the god of death, he wants to be fair to everyone. However, a twist in the story, which will be revealed in the coming episodes, will change all that." The character first appeared on the 64th episode of the series.

== Production ==
Principal photography commenced in September 2012, The production used different filming locations. The series was shot primarily in the towns of Pagsanjan and Cavinti in the province of Laguna. The entire Spanish-era village was built along the banks of the Pagsanjan River in Pagsanjan especially for the series. It is where most of the "Pueblo" scenes are shot. The setup includes a church facade, the Spanish quarters (including the mansion of Juancho and Victoria Sanreal), and the village of the locals. Other locations include: Intramuros Manila, Inao-Awan, Lumot Lake in Cavinti, Laguna, Morong Park and Subic Bay Port in Subic, Zambales, Bolinao, Pangasinan and Tanay, Rizal. Filming locations were chosen by production designers, Rodell Cruz and Jerran Ordinario. Theater and independent film director Dennis Marasigan was hired as movement and crowd director. The production budget was 50 million Philippine pesos, making the series as one of the most expensive drama series in Philippine television. The series was slated to air for twenty weeks consisting of 98 episodes.

== Music ==
Von de Guzman created the underscore for the series. De Guzman— composed the opening credits theme or the "heroic" music playing during the opening credits. De Guzman also worked in tandem with writer Vim Nadera in creating other themes like: "May Laya" (transl. There is Freedom), a war song or the song usually playing during the battle scenes; the closing credits theme "Lupang Payapa" (transl. Peaceful Land) which was also used various times as a "love theme" for Malaya/Simeon and Rosa's scenes; and "Aking Anak" (transl. My Child), a "melodic" or somewhat a lullaby used during scenes involving Malaya and his adoptive mother Linang.

== Reception ==
=== Ratings ===
According to AGB Nielsen Philippines' Mega Manila household television ratings, the pilot episode of Indio earned a 29.3% rating. The final episode scored a 26.6% rating.

=== Critical response ===
Alwin M. Ignacio of The Daily Tribune said: "Grand is the best adjective to describe Indio. The camera shots are panoramic. The grandeur is seen and felt during the fight scenes and exodus sequences. You grasp the opulence and magic when you first catch sight of the diwatas in meeting." The Philippine Star's entertainment columnist, Ricky Lo felt that the series "It's almost as big as a movie. No. Indio is even bigger than and presumably better than a movie." Bibsy M. Carballo of The Philippine Star said that "If there were to be a historical drama-fantasy series that would reach epic proportions, it would have to be Indio!" Entertainment columnist and Startalk host, Lolit Solis complimented the ensemble's acting performances, including Vince Magbanua who played younger Malaya/Simeon. Isah V. Red of Manila Standard and Nestor Cuartero of Tempo complimented Revilla's acting performance. Red said that "He isn't too far behind in scenes that have actors like Michael de Mesa, Chinggoy Alonso, Ronnie Lazaro, and Jackie Lou Blanco. Viewers can easily discern each of the characters they are watching due to the clear portrayal by the actors who fittingly tint their roles with the proper tones, and Revilla, though not formally schooled in acting, displays keen understanding of characterization." Cuartero said "He proves beyond doubt that aside from being an "action star", he is also very competent in drama, investing the part with his heroic presence." Writer-director Ronald Carballo impressed with the performances of Revilla, De Mesa, Jennylyn Mercado, Sheena Halili and Vaness del Moral, said that "with the great flow of the story, wonderful performances and excellent cinematography, I am hooked now on the show, as in every night." Noel Asiñas of The Journal praised the show's action stunts, said that "Indio's stunts are well-choreographed. It's my first time to watch that kind of stunts in local television."

The series was also positively received by other writers. Blogger, Ely Valendez of Ely's Planet reviews: "What's more interesting in Indio 'though is the story itself that's strongly related to the Philippine history." Valendez also dubbed "Indio as the new Encantadia." Jason Lim of the blog Taking A Break praises the series' special effects, said that "Indio really benefited from an early pre-production date as most of the effects are seamless. The scene with the Baconaua and the opening scene that tied down the timeline/era were exceptionally done." Blogger Neil Celeste Rara described the show as "thrilling and visually captivating", stating "While the ratings war remains to be tough and the battle is fought day by day, the people behind this wonderful series have a reason to sleep soundly at night, for they not only have done their jobs well, they have also created a piece of art that viewers will always remember." Dinno Erece of the blog Show and Tell, said "we were so impressed by the special effects of the Indio to think it's only a television series. We're daring to say this but Indio has a better special effects than that of Si Agimat, si Enteng Kabisote at si Ako and Shake, Rattle & Roll 14. [And] it's not just the special effects, even the production design and the costume and the history, they're fully researched."

== Accolades ==
Accolades received by Indio
Year	Award	Category	Recipient	Result	Ref.
2013	27th PMPC Star Awards for Television	Best Drama Actor	Bong Revilla, Jr.	Nominated	
2013	27th PMPC Star Awards for Television	Best Primetime Drama Series	Indio	Nominated	
2014	Golden Screen TV Awards	Outstanding Original Drama Program	Indio	Nominated	
2014	Golden Screen TV Awards	Outstanding Supporting Actress in a Drama Program	Sheena Halili	Nominated	
