= Marc Justine Alvarez =

Filipino actor (born 2005)

- Born: Marc Justine Alvarez; March 18, 2005 (age 21); Manila, Philippines
- Occupation: Actor
- Years active: 2012–present
- Agent: GMA Artist Center

Marc Justine Alvarez (born March 18, 2005) is a Filipino actor.

== Personal life and acting career ==
Marc Justine graduated elementary in April 2017 from Laong Laan Elementary School.

== Filmography ==
Year	Title	Role
2017	Kambal, Karibal	Young Makoy
2017	Mulawin vs Ravena	Young Pagaspas
2017	Kaibigan	Young Jeff
2017	Pinulot ka lang sa Lupa	Young Ephraim
2016	Lope (Short)	
2016	Conan, My Beautician	Young Prince
2015	Once Upon a Kiss	Young Mickey Abueva
2015-2017	Karelasyon	Harry's Classmate / Tom-Tom / Gio
2014	Ang Dalawang Mrs. Real	Antonio Real IV
2014	So It's You	Nonoy
2014	Ilaw ng Kahapon	Pocholo
2014	Carmela	Bambam Mener
2013	Transit	Joshua
2013	One Day Isang Araw	Sunny
2013	Indio	Antonio
2012	Alice Bungisngis and Her Wonder Walis	Wally D' Wonder Walis
