= Adhara (disambiguation) =

Adhara is the traditional name of the binary star system Epsilon Canis Majoris.

It may also refer to:

- Adhara Encantadia , a character in the television drama series Encantadia
- Adhara, Bangladesh, a village in eastern Bangladesh
- Adhara (yoga), a type of mudra in yoga
- Apostolepis adhara, the São Salvador burrow-snake
- USS Adhara, a naval cargo ship

== See also ==
- Adara
