= Adara =

Adara may refer to:

- Adara people, an ethnic group in Nigeria
- Adara language, a language of Nigeria
- Adhara or Adara, the traditional name of the star Epsilon Canis Majoris
- Adara (East Timor), a town on Atauro Island, East Timor
- Adara (deity), the Qemant name for the Deity
- Adara Group, international development NGO
- ADARA Networks, American software company
- Adara, the fictional embodiment of hope, the emotion that powers the Blue Lantern Corps in the DC Comics universe

== See also ==
- Adhara (disambiguation)
