= List of Encantadia (2016 TV series) characters =

Encantadia is a Philippine television drama series directed by Mark Reyes and written by Suzette Doctolero, which premiered on GMA Network and worldwide through GMA Pinoy TV on July 18, 2016. The story is a reboot (often called as requel or retelling-sequel) to the original 2005 fantasy-action series of the same name. The following is a list of characters from the Encantadia 2016 television series.

== Premise ==
Encantadia is a vast continent, a realm away from the mortals. Encantadia is about an exciting and thrilling tale about the adventures and journey of the Diwanis to Sang'gres and now as Haras. Their purpose in their world, their fate and one's destiny, and their defeats and champions against the endless and inevitable dark forces.

== Fairies of Encantadia ==
Former Queens of Lireo

- Cassiopea

Portrayed by Solenn Heussaff-Bolzico, originally played by Cindy Kurleto.
The first ruling queen or the Hara Duryé of Lireo. She was a powerful fairy sorceress. Also known as Ang Mata (the Eye) of Encantadia. Cassiopea is regarded as the bunggaitan or the most powerful engkantado in Encantadia, being a master in both the mystical and martial arts. She was entrusted the life-long responsibility of safekeeping the Mother Gem after it was created by Bathalang Emre to protect all life on their realm. However, after Sang'gre Adhara launched a full-blown attack on her secluded island to steal the Mother Gem, the former queen chose to cleave the powerful weapon, splitting it into five smaller gems. As punishment for playing god, Cassiopea was cursed with an immortal life, unable to set foot in the kingdom she once ruled. During her exile, she used her power of precognition to help the citizens of Encantadia find the answers they seek in exchange for gold pieces. She directly opposed Bathalumang Ether, one of the creators of Encantadia who became intent on causing disorder and destruction in their realm, and played a vital role in Sang'gre Lira's mission to unite the five gems and bring reconciliation to the four feuding daughters of the former Hara Mine-a. She eventually aspired to become a deity herself, which was granted by Emre after she died trying to save Encantadia and for successfully restoring him into power. During her reign as the Queen of Lireo, she adopted an infant Sapirian named LilaSari, and the two shared a complicated mother-daughter relationship. She is the owner of the Kabilan, a twin-bladed wand which could turn into a sword, spar, staff, scepter, dagger, and boomerang. She dons a purple armor during combat. She speaks only Enchanta, but speaks Tagalog using telepathy.

- Ursula

Hara Ursula of Lireo is the second Queen of Lireo. Not much is known about her personal reign and why she was designated as Cassiopea's successor. It was said that she died due to a grave sickness.

- Demetria

Hara Demetria of Lireo is the third Queen of Lireo, the successor of Ursula. Not much is known about her reign, or her relationship with her predecessors, Cassiopea and Ursula. She had a daughter named Esmeralda. She died due to grave sickness just like Hara Ursula. After her death, she was succeeded by Esmeralda's daughter, Mine-a.

- Ynang Reyna Mine-a / Hara Mine-a

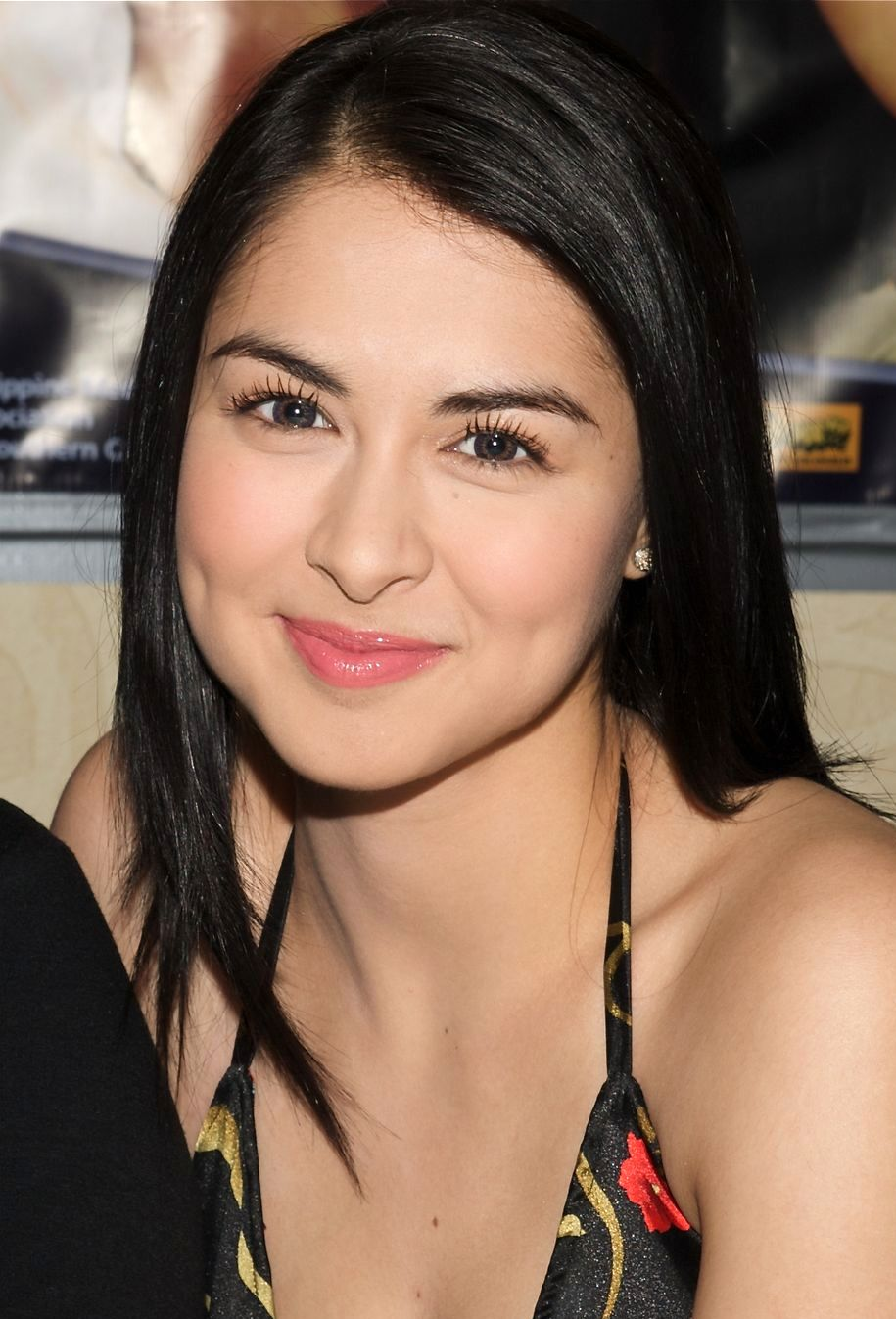
Marian Rivera portrays Ynang Reyna Minea, originally played by Dawn Zulueta.

Portrayed by Marian Rivera-Dantes, Janice Hung (Mine-a in disguise),
Former Queen of Lireo and the Sorcerer/ess Supreme of Encantadia. Mine-a was once the keeper of all four elemental gems. Mine-a passed the throne to her second daughter, Amihan. She is the daughter of Esmeralda, who was known as the most powerful Diwata of her time, and sister to Amihan I. Mine-a is the mother of Sang'gres Pirena, Amihan II, Alena and Danaya, and grandmother of Sang'gres Lira, Mira, Flamarra, Kahlil, Armea, Adamus, Gaeia and Terra. She killed with a poisoned arrow by Prinsipe Asval of Sapiro. She owns Laya (sword) and the queen's scepter as her main weapon. She was resurrected by Keros to evilness to forfeit her daughters. After her motherly sacrifice, she became an orb seed, which is now planted in the gardens of Lireo, as a memory of love. She once owned the four gems. Her armor is gold and blue with a red cape but was upgraded into a darker armor. Her remains and Lira's hair was used to create another Sang'gre and Lira's sister by Cassiopea.

=== Old Sang'gres of Lireo ===
- Esmeralda

originally played by Sheila Marie Rodriguez.
Sang'gre Esmeralda of Lireo is the daughter of Demetria, Queen of Lireo. At some point she left the royal court, and had two daughters, Minea and Amihan I. According to Imaw, she had been slain by the greedy Etherians. Since she predeceased her mother, she never became Queen of Lireo, but her daughter Mine-a became queen. He is known to be the most powerful diwata who ever lived followed by Cassiopea as the new Bunggaitan (most powerful).

- Amihan I

Portrayed by Max Collins-Magno
The sister of Ynang Reyna Mine-a. Sang'gre Amihan I accidentally died on the hands of her own sister, after Adhara used her as a cover during her battle with Mine-a. Minea's second daughter was given the same name after her death. She was a Lirean champion during the Etherian empire.

- Adhara

Portrayed by Sunshine Dizon
Next-in-line to the throne of Lireo, after the death of her ashti Hara Demetria, who was the queen that time. Cassiopea, however, chose the young Sang'gre Mine-a as the new Queen, much to Adhara's dismay. Sang'gre Adhara was defeated by Mine-a. In her death, she arrived in Balaak, the hell of Encantadia, but was granted by Bathalang Arde the opportunity to come back to life through the sacrifice of the lives of the good. By her return in Lireo, Adhara was sent to Carcero by Vish'ka upon the latter's orders; there, she started a revolution with other imprisoned diwatas to bring the Lireo Kingdom down. Later on, Adhara was killed off by Hara Amihan in the latter's quest to find her daughter Lira who was kept in a mystic crystal orb. She was the original and former owner of Lupig (mystic and powerful staff) who is now in Alena's ownership. The Lupig was supposed to be Danaya's but Alena was the chosen one as shown when she used it to battle the Hadezars. She wears a gold armor and later wears a Carcero armor after her escape with LilaSari and Carcero prisoners.

- Mitena

Portrayed by Rhian Ramos
She is the daughter of Memen, and Ornia, and the evil twin sister of Cassiopea. She was born as an ivtre. Her name, Mitena, means sumpa (curse).

=== Sang'gres of Lireo ===
- Pirena

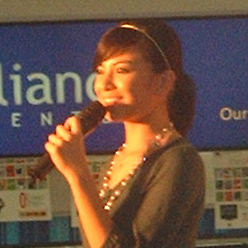
Glaiza de Castro portrays Sang'gre Pirena, originally played by Sunshine Dizon.

Portrayed by Glaiza de Castro, Barbara Miguel (Teen Diwani Pirena), Dimple Magnaye (Child Diwani Pirena).
The villain turned hero daughter of Mine-a to then Prinsipe Hagorn of Hathoria, Pirena is the eldest of the four Sang'gre sisters, ashti of Sang'gres Lira, Kahlil, Armea, Adamus, Gaeia and Terra, and the mother of Sang'gres Mira and Flamarra. She is the keeper of the Brilyante ng Apoy (Gemstone of Fire). With the help of her gemstone, Pirena has the ability to control fire (including any related to the fiery element) and can shapeshift into anyone. She is currently ruling as the Hara (queen) of the newly rebuilt kingdom of Hathoria. She carries two swords named Baga and Siklab which can fuse into one sword. She formerly gained the ability to melt and burn things with her hands due to Bathaluman Ether's curse; she even died temporarily due to the curse. She is the love interest of a fiery Punjabwe named Azulan. After the last war at Encantadia, she and Azulan were married and had a child named Flamarra. She wears her red armor and was upgraded into an Etherian armor by Ether but she no longer wears the armor when she died by Ether's curse.

- Amihan II

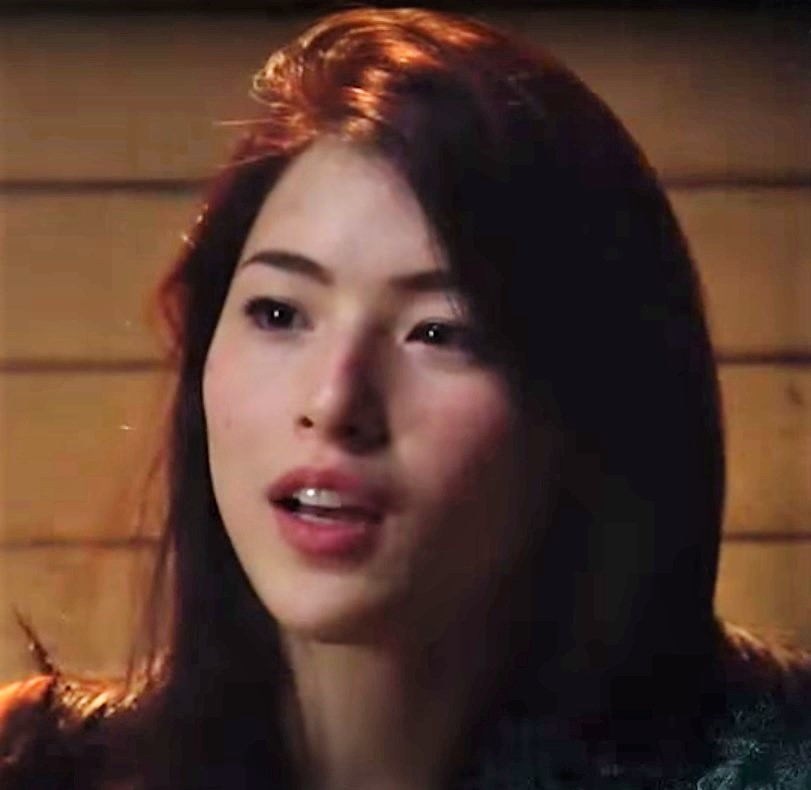
Kylie Padilla portrays Sang'gre Amihan II (Hara Amihan), originally played by Iza Calzado.

Portrayed by Kylie Padilla, Dayara Shane (Diwani Amihan).
Named after Mine-a's deceased sister, Amihan is the love-child daughter of Ynang Reyna Mine-a to Prinsipe Raquim of Sapiro, the second of the four Sang'gre sisters, the mother of Sang'gre Lira, and the aunt of Sang'gres Mira, Flamarra, Khalil, Armea, Adamus, Gaeia and Terra. She is the guardian of the Brilyante ng Hangin (Gemstone of Air). With the power grand to her by her gemstone, Amihan has the ability to manipulate air and forecast the weather, as well as flying. Amihan eventually sacrificed her life being killed by Rama Hagorn of Hathoria, and later returned (along with her nephew Kahlil) from Devas as an Ivtre (soul) to battle the undead Hadezar soldiers. Reincarnated as Ariana due to her death wish that she hopes to return to her family and kingdom. She owns the Arkrey (sword) by her late father Prinsipe Raquim of Sapiro. She is the love interest of Rama Ybrahim. She became an Ivtre again after Ariana died in the war. She wears her blue armor which was upgraded over black robes and when she became an ivtre she donned her similar white armor modified with gold and black.

- Alena

Portrayed by Gabbi Garcia, Althea Ablan (Diwani Alena), originally played by Karylle.
The daughter of Mine-a to the Sapirian hunter, Enuo. Alena is the third of the four Sang'gre sisters, as well as the mother of Sang'gres Kahlil, and Armea, her children with Rama Ybrahim of Sapiro and Sang'gre Adamus, her another son to a Gunikar named Memfes. She is also the aunt of Sang'gres Mira, Flamarra, Gaeia and Terra. She is the keeper of the Brilyante ng Tubig (Gemstone of Water). Alena has the ability and power to do anything with water and to use her voice that can daze people and lose their control or even kill themselves. She is currently the consort Queen of Adamya and the new guardian of Adhara's Lupig. Her main weapon is Agos (javelin/pilum). She was the mentor of her niece Sang'gre Lira on how to use her vocal power as a Sang'gre. She became Memfes' love interest and became the last queen of Lireo. She wears her green armor when in combat and could create shields to protect herself. She could also speak to animals and life forms as a half-Sapiryan.

- Danaya

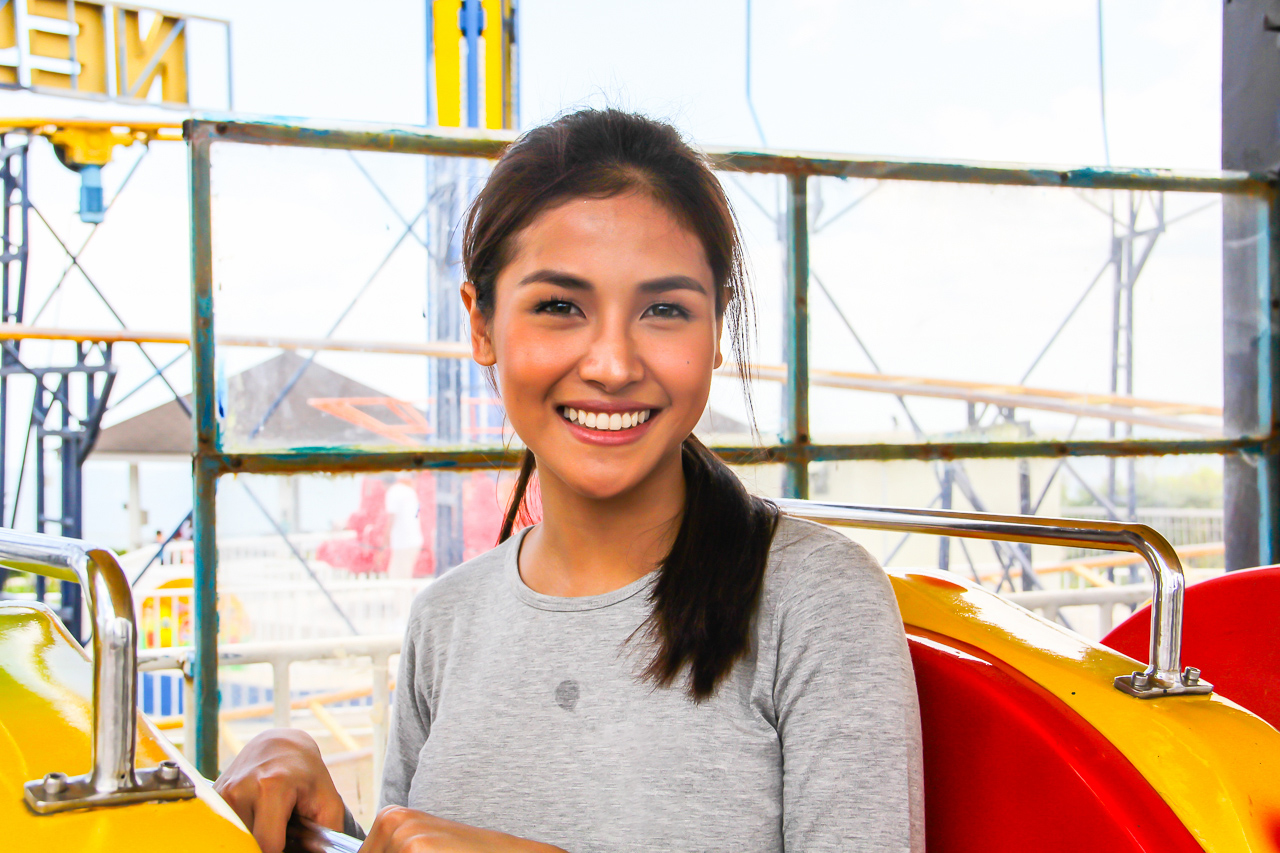
Sanya Lopez portrays Sang'gre Danaya, originally played by Diana Zubiri.

Portrayed by Sanya Lopez, JC Movido (Diwani Danaya).
Danaya is the fourth and youngest of the four Sang'gre daughters of Mine-a. She is the second daughter of Ynang Reyna Mine-a to the Sapirian hunter Enuo, making Sang'gres Alena and Danaya the only full-blooded sisters among the four. She is also the aunt of Sang'gres Mira, Flamarra, Lira, Kahlil, Armea, and Adamus. She is the keeper of the Brilyante ng Lupa (Gemstone of Earth). By the help of her gemstone, Danaya has the ability to control the nature and environment, can heal herself and anyone, and can transform into any animal she wishes. After Amihan's queenly sacrifice, Danaya became the new Hara (queen) of Lireo as was assigned to her by her sister. She is Mashna Duryé Aquil's love interest. She is equipped with arnis sticks called Balangis which can be combined into a bo staff. She donned her blue armor and formerly owned the Gemstone of Air, which is now a master to Ariana. Danaya married Aquil after the war and they had a child named Gaiea who tragically lost her life alongside her father. The exact circumstances surrounding their deaths remain shrouded in mystery and have yet to be revealed. She wears her brown armor and could speak to animals and life forms as her in-born ability. In the spin-off series Encantadia Chronicles: Sang'gre, Danaya bore her second child in the human realm and named her Terra, who will be the next generation of Sang'gres and the next appointed keeper of the "Brilyante ng Lupa" (Gemstone of Earth). It has been prophesied that Terra will be the savior who will defeat the new threat and enemy to Encantadia, Mitena.

- Lira

Portrayed by Mikee Quintos, Chlaui Malayao (Diwani Lira), originally played by Jennylyn Mercado.
The daughter of Amihan and Ybrahim, paternal older half-sister and cousin of Sang'gres Kahlil and Armea, best friend cousin of Sang'gre Mira. She is also the cousin of Sang'gres Flamarra, Adamus, Gaeia and Terra. Born when her grandmother Mine-a was assassinated by Asval, Sang'gre Lira was banished by her Ashti (aunt) Pirena to the human world when she was still an infant and even try to kill her, but she was given a protection by her Ashti Danaya against anyone who wished to do something against her especially Pirena. She was granted a blessing with a beautiful voice by her Ashti Alena. The rightful heiress to the throne of Lireo, Sang'gre Lira has the ability of unique speed. A third-generation Sang'gre, and she was chosen as the new guardian of the Brilyante ng Lupa. In their training in Cassiopea's Island, however, Lira was brutally killed by Asval with a real gun from the human world, under the orders of Ether and Avria. She owns the golden forged sword called the Avatar, a gift by Vish'ka and blessed by the ivtre of the nunong Diwata, Ades; but she refuses to use this after her mother's death, and now she uses her knowledge of magic, illusions, and spells as her weapon. After her untimely and tragic death, the Avatar is now wielded by Ybrahim. She remained as a fresh corpse in Lireo with Mira, Wahid, and Gilas after Arde, Ether, and Keros took over Devas. However, she and Mira was resurrected by Bathalang Arde in order to be used as a blackmail to the Sang'gres. They were in a mystic sleep suffering with grave illness and pain until she was cured by new Bathalumang Cassiopea. Her name means shining jewel. In her stay in the human world, she gathered their millennial language, for befriended Anthony, and also acquiring her adoptive name, Mila or short for Milagros which means miracle who unexpectedly came behind the wilderness. Sang'gre Lira is eventually resides with her father at Sapiro and then Cassiopea gave Cassandra to Lira as her own daughter which Cassandra will be the future queen of Sapiro. She donned her gown and sang'gre dress even her armor which was later upgraded into blue and silver cape.

- Mira

Portrayed by Kate Valdez, Kariz Edren Espinosa (Diwani Mira), originally played by Yasmien Kurdi.
The daughter of Pirena to Gamil, a Lirean soldier, half-sister of Sang'gre Flamarra, best-friend cousin of Sang'gre Lira, cousin of Sang'gres Khalil, Armea, Adamus, Gaeia and Terra and aunt of Cassandra. Pirena gave birth to Mira as part of her mother's plot to take over the throne of Lireo. Like Lira, she was born when their grandmother Mine-a was assassinated by Asval. She is a diwani of Hathoria and Lireo. During her stay in the human world, Mira had a relationship with Anthony, Lira's friend. A third-generation Sang'gre, she was chosen as the new guardian of the Brilyante ng Tubig due to the opposite attitude she manifests unlike from her mother. She carries the sword called the Kamao of Emre which gave her the ability of shockwave. She was killed by Asval, slaining her neck during their training in Cassiopea's island. She remained as a fresh corpse with Lira, Gilas, and Wahid in Lireo after Arde, Ether, and Keros took over Devas. However, she and Lira was resurrected by Bathalang Arde in order to be used as a blackmail to the Sang'gres. They were in a mystic sleep suffering with grave illness and pain until she was cured by an antidote given by Hara Pirena who negotiated to her Grandfather Hagorn exchanging his Mashna, Andora. She was joined and survived to the last war and she currently resides in her mother's side and Lireo. Her name formerly means myrrh but it actually means a significant gem. She donned her armor similar to her mother's and gown during the final days of the Etherian War. She wears her red armor similar to her mother's.

- Kahlil

Portrayed by Avery Paraiso, originally played by Jake Cuenca.
The first known male Sang'gre, Kahlil is the first child of Alena and Ybrahim, the older brother of Sang'gre Armea and half-brother of Sang'gre Adamus, the cousin of Sang'gres Mira, Flamarra, Gaeia and Terra and the uncle of Cassandra. He is destined to kill his cousin and half-sister, Sang'gre Lira. When Kahlil meets the Cassiopea, she attempted to manipulate him to prevent the foreseen future from happening; while Bathalumang Ether ordered Haring Hagorn to take Kahlil into his care. He was later mistakenly killed by his Ashti Danaya. Later on, Kahlil, along with his ashti, the late Amihan, returns from Devas as an Ivtre to battle the undead Hadezar soldiers by Hagorn. He remains as a Devas ivtre as he, Alira Naswen, Gamil, and others helped Emre fight the evil deities.

- Cassandra

Portrayed by Michelle Dee, originally played by Ella Guevara.
She was created by Cassiopea by her blood, Lira's hair and Amihan's ashes. Lira's daughter, she was given to Rama Ybrahim and Lira as the next ruler of Sapiro. In the spin-off series Encantadia Chronicles: Sang'gre, Cassandra was the Hara (queen) of Lireo, and the keeper of the Brilyante ng Hangin (Gemstone of Air).

- Adamus

Portrayed by Kelvin Miranda, Angelo Teves (Diwan Adamus).
Alena's second child and 1st son to Memfes. He is the half-brother of Sang'gres Kahlil, and Armea. He is also the nephew of the Sang'gres Pirena, Amihan and Danaya. Sang'gres Mira, Flamarra, Lira, Gaiea and Terra are his cousins. Sang'gre Lira's Daughter, Cassandra is also his niece.

- Flamarra

Portrayed by Faith da Silva, Cheska Maranan (Diwani Flamarra).
Pirena's second child and 1st daughter to Azulan. She is the youngest half-sister of Sang'gre Mira, niece of the Sang'gres Amihan, Alena and Danaya. Ariana is also her aunt to Azulan and Deshna to her mother Pirena. Sang'gres Lira, Kahlil, Armea, Adamus, Gaiea, and Terra are her cousins. Lira's daughter, Cassandra is her niece.

- Terra

Portrayed by Bianca Umali, Juharra Asayo (Diwani Terra).
Danaya's second daughter from a human named Theo. She's the half-sister of Gaiea. She is also the niece of Sang'gres Pirena, Amihan and Alena, The cousin of Sang'gres Lira, Mira, Kahlil, Adamus, Armea, and Flamarra and the aunt of Cassandra, Lira's daughter.

- Deia

Portrayed by Angel Guardian, Keith Silagan (Verana Deia).
Olgana's Daughter.

- Gaiea

Portrayed by Cassandra Lavarias.
She was the love child of Danaya, and Mashna Duryé Aquil. She is the half-sister of Sang'gre Terra, The cousin of Sang'gres Lira, Mira, Kahlil, Armea, Flamarra and Adamus, and the aunt of Cassandra, Lira's Daughter.

=== Lirean Army ===
- Aquil

Portrayed by Rocco Nacino, originally played by Alfred Vargas.
The Mashna Duri-e (former general) of the Lirean army, Aquil is a loyal friend and soldier to the Ynang Reyna during her reign. He trained the queen's four daughters to reach their full potentials in fighting with dignity. Aquil then started a relationship with Sang'gre Danaya, but later breaks up with her due to a series of unfortunate events including Danaya's reign as Lirean Queen, in which it is strictly prohibited by the laws that Queen cannot marry or have any relationship. He equipped the Hirada a sword from his father. Aquil is the husband of Danaya and the father of Danaya's child, Gaiea.

- Muros

Portrayed by Carlo Gonzales, originally played by Arthur Solinap.
A trusted Lirean soldier and second-in command to Aquil. Later on, after Aquil abandoned Lireo, Muros then became the Mashna (general/first-in-command) of Lirean soldiers.

- Hitano

Portrayed by Pancho Magno, originally played by Polo Ravales.
A Lirean soldier who is obsessively attracted to Sang'gre Alena. Hitano accepted Sang'gre Pirena's offer to live with the memory-removed Alena in the mortal world. He then came back to Lireo to find Alena (who escaped him), only to be captured by Adhara. Later on, Hitano started a relationship with LilaSari, only to be eventually killed by Hagorn in the human world. He returns as an Ivtre, allied with Lireo. As an ivtre, he has a meticulous and powerful sense. He was late purified as a Devas Ivtre .

- Icarus

Portrayed by Ervic Vijandre.
The Lirean soldier who assisted Pirena in her rebellion with other Diwatas, which ended in the fall of Hara Amihan. Upon Sang'gre Pirena's claiming of the throne, he became the Mashna (Head Soldier) of the royal army. He was later killed by Asval due to Hagorn's orders.

- Gamil

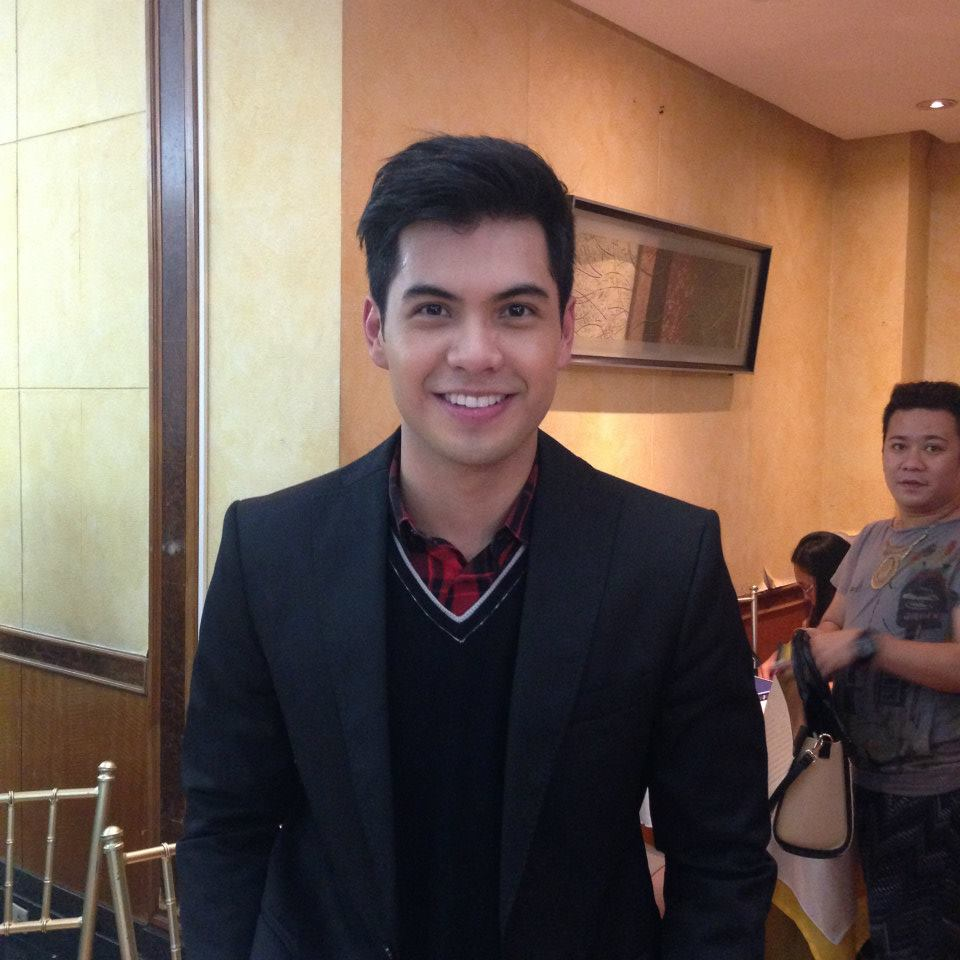
Ken Alfonso portrays Gamil.

Portrayed by Ken Alfonso.
Pirena approached a sleeping diwata soldier in the forest. He was probably picked because he was isolated from his fellow soldiers. When he woke up, Pirena used a fiery enchantment on him. Pirena seduced and used him to have a child before she killed him. He is the father of Sang'gre Mira. He was a brave ivtre who used to escape for the good sake; but now, he became a traitor after he was manipulated by the evil goddess Ether.

- Abog

Portrayed by Daniel Dasalla Bato, originally played by Lloyd Baredo.
The high-ranking soldier of the Lirean army. He was promoted as a Hafte in Lirean Army during Danaya's reign. He is married to a Diwata Dama of Lireo and had a child. He died after the final war of Lireo, Sapiro and Hathoria between Hagorn and Etherian forces.

=== Lambana ===
- Muyak

Portrayed by Klea Pineda, originally played by Nancy Castiglione.
A lambana (pixie) friend of Sang'gre Alena. Muyak is Sang'gre Lira's guide and teacher in the human world. She was chosen by Bathalang Emre as the new successor of Sagisag ng Lireo, she is now one of the new guardians of the Brilyante ng Hangin. She also became a retre of Devas. Surviving new keeper of the Brilyante ng Hangin with Ariana. She knows Lireo, Capade, and other locations in Encantadia very well. She was slashed to death by an Etherian soldier during the Etherian-Hadezar War. She is now an ivtre and resides in Devas along with Deshna.

- Butil

Butil was one of the lambanas who underwent banyuhay. Alena asked her where Muyak was, but she tells Alena that Muyak never came to the banyuhay.

- Linggit

Linggit is a lambana leader. Amihan tells her to order the other lambanas to help in the search for Mira.

- Nuno

Nuno is the queen of the lambanas who witnessed the transformation of Muyak into a fully-grown sized Diwata, which is due from being the Lambana savior after the Agodo attacks.

=== Other Diwatas ===
- Ades

Portrayed by Ana Feleo.
Head Dama (maiden princess) during Queen Minea and Queen Amihan's reign. Killed by Hagorn and became a spirit-messenger (Gabay-Diwa) of Devas. She sacrificed her life as an ivtre in order for the other ivtres to escape.

- Gurna

Portrayed by Vaness del Moral-Kier, originally played by Girlie Sevilla.
Half Diwata and half Hathor who is a spy for Hathoria and undercover dama of Lireo. She brainwashed Pirena into thinking that Amihan is her mom's favorite. She is exceptionally skilled in combat, uses karate style moves, uses Hathorian knives and daggers as her main weapons, and sleeping powder. She became a head dama of Pirena's reign. She was killed by Pirena after not giving her Minea's letter about how she loves her. Amihan, Alena and Danaya discover Gruna's brainwashed to their sister Pirena's that caused their sister against them, and never forgave her for what she has done to her for using her to against them. Her ivtre vanished and went to Balaak. She wears a modified version of the female Hathorian armor with hathor markings on her face.

- Rael

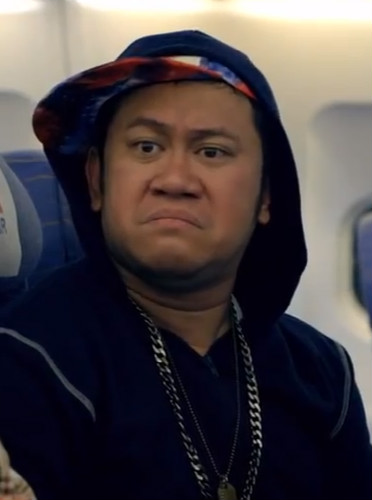
Betong Sumaya portrays Rael.

Portrayed by Betong Sumaya.
A loyal friend and companion of Enuo, Rael joined the Enuo's journey to the mortal world, where they now reside for good.

- Amarro

Portrayed by Alfred Vargas.
The late father of Aquil, who debuted in Episode 134. Amarro was known to be close to the Hathors, so close that he became a spy for them. His betrayal led his soul be sent to the Balaak. He was revived by Arde and Ether. Amarro is currently allied with the revived kingdom of Etheria, but he and LilaSari are seen to have a conscience. He is the new lover of LilaSari after Hitano.

- Babaylans

The healing practitioners who nurse an injured Encantado/Encantada back to health. There are a lot of them in Lireo. They are most commonly seen in the Hall of Faith and the Throne Room.

=== Carcero ===
- Hafte Lanzu

Portrayed by Maureen Larrazabal.
The Chief of Carcero, the prison of criminal diwatas. Hafte Lanzu take orders from the Queen of Lireo. She started an illegal match where in she forced the prisoners to fight each other. After an uprising in Carcero, headed by prisoner Sang'gre Adhara, which led into a massive prisoner break out, Hafte Lanzu was killed by Reyna Pirena as a punishment.

- Orthana

Portrayed by Geraldine Villamil.
Hafte Lanzu's right-hand woman and head guard of Carcero. She was killed by LilaSari during the prisoners' uprising and breakout.

=== Transformed Diwata ===
- Paopao / Paolo Aguirre

Portrayed by Yuan Francisco (young), Phytos Ramirez (adult), Rodjun Cruz (Soul Guardian).
Paopao is a young boy from the human world who had been abducted by the bandidos of Encantadia. He is revealed to be the first keeper of the Soul Gem, which was a shard of the Mother Gem.

After many years, the Soul Gem once again chose Paopao as its master. Paopao was one of the three keepers to survive the Last War against Hagorn, and the only one never to have died.

== Adamya ==
=== Adamyan ===
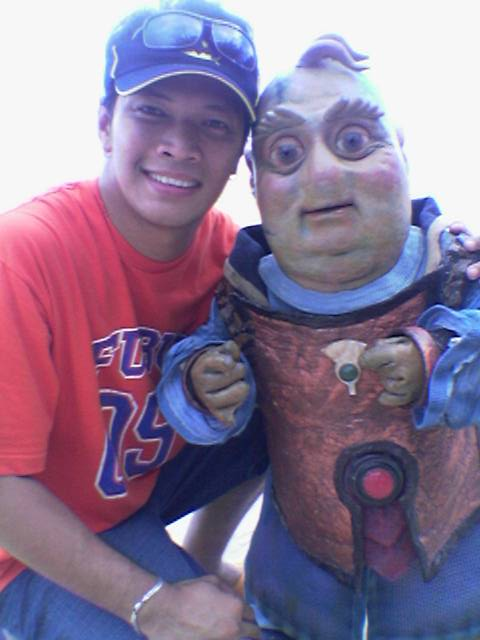
Imaw is voiced by Noel Urbano (left)

- Imaw

Voiced by Noel Urbano.
Imaw is the leader of the Adamyans and the second keeper of Brilyante ng Tubig (Jewel of Water). After the fall of Adamya to the hands of Haring Arvak of Hathoria, Imaw and the rest of surviving Adamyans resided in Lireo. Imaw offers his extensive knowledge of clairvoyance and time precognition through his magical balintataw (Adamyan staff) that helps the Diwatas.

- Imok

Voiced by Noel Urbano.
Imok was Imaw's brother who is cursed by Bathalumang Haliya to live for a short period of time due to his greediness. Imok can release greenish-black smoke that can change anyone's loyalty and emotion.

- Dilawan

Voiced by Noel Urbano.
Dilawan was hailed from Adamya; he was Imaw's cousin who can foresee the future and anyone's purity of heart. After the fall of Adamya due to Hathoria, he resided with the Picarros and Yudo-o tribe near Mt. Ajak for their safety who welcomed him skeptically. Dilawan decided to separate ways with Imaw and other Adamyans due to his wish of independence as he maintains his relationship with his fellow Adamyans.

- Aegen

Voiced by Noel Urbano.
Aegen was Imaw's descendant and the founder of Adamya along with the Sirenas who usually usurps in the Batis ng Katotohanan. He was slain by the greedy Etherians during the Great Encantadian War. He has the same abilities as Imaw, Imok, and Dilawan.

- Banak and Nakba

A pair of playful Adamyans always seen hanging around the gardens and forest of Lireo. Once Etherians who thrived on trickery, until Ether cursed them.

- Awoo

A large, brownish-orange mammal-like quadruped, with facial features resembling a dog. He is covered with shaggy fur, has large eyes, a long beard and huge ears. His forelegs are considerably longer than his hind legs. He came from Adamya. He holds the distinction of being the only named pet in the series.

=== Gunikar ===
- Memfes

portrayed by Lance Serrano.
Leader of Gunikar tribe in Adamya. He falls in love with Sang'gre Alena and asks her to marry him after he tried to abduct her. He, along with other Gunikars, saved the Sang'gres from Andora's mind control. Gunikars are immune from any mind-control. Memfes is a half-Pashnea half-Adamyan. He owns an enchanted flute that can let anyone stagger into a deep sleep just like Sang'gre Alena of Adamya. He is the father of Adamus, the son of Sang'gre Alena. He died in the war by saving Sang'gre Alena from Andora. Memfes was slain by Andora.

=== Nymfas ===
- Helgad

Portrayed by Wynwyn Marquez.
The adoptive Nymfa-Barbaro mother of baby Deshna/Luna, who was killed by LilaSari — under Ether's enchantment.

- Quina

Portrayed by Princess de Luna.
Quina is the young daughter of Helgad. Quina witnessed the murder of her mother Helgad by LilaSari, in which made Luna swearing revenge against LilaSari. She is the adoptive younger sister of Luna.

- Gilas

Portrayed by Jake Vargas.
Sera's son and Deshna's childhood friend while growing up together under the care of the nymfas. In the training of the new keepers at Cassiope-a's Island, Gilas is killed by Hera Andora (in Agane's body). He remains as a fresh corpse with Lira, Mira, and Wahid after Arde, Ether, and Keros took over Devas. He uses a jungle-spear and the fruit of Kawati to be temporarily invisible.

- Sera

Sera is the mother of Gilas. She cries out when one of her livestock was taken by an Argona. She asked Helgad to summon Luna to recover it. Sera was one of the nymfas abducted by the new Etherians and later hypnotized by Avria. Sera battles Alena but she is knocked down before Avria intervenes to fight Alena and her group. She is freed from Avria's control some other time. However, she mourns for her son's death after Gilas has slain by the Etherians particularly Hera Andora of Sensa. It is presumed that Sera is the new leader of the nymphas after Helgad's death.

- Balda

A nymfa. She was one of the three nymfas who first found Deshna, after a dragon took her away on Agane's orders.

- Kugol

A nymfa. He was one of the three nymfas who first found Deshna, after a dragon took her away on Agane's orders.

== Sapiro ==
=== Royal Sapiryans ===
- Jamir

Portrayed by Paolo Gumabao.
Jamir is LilaSari's father. The Bathalumang Haliya loved him dearly and granted his every desire, she even entrusted to him the De-jar and the riches of the moon that was used for his founding kingdom. He however betrayed the Bathaluman. He took riches from Haliya's home to build a palace for his true love, Felicia and their daughter who is named by Cassiopea as LilaSari. One night, Jamir returned to the Moon and took a few diamonds and gold from Haliya, with her consent, unknown to the Bathaluman that he will use it to build the palace of Sapiro for the Diwata he truly loves and their daughter. This angered Haliya causing her to pour her anger on Jamir's daughter, bestowing her a curse to have a beautiful but deadly face that who ever looks at it even her own parents will perish. He is the grandfather of Deshna.

- Raquim

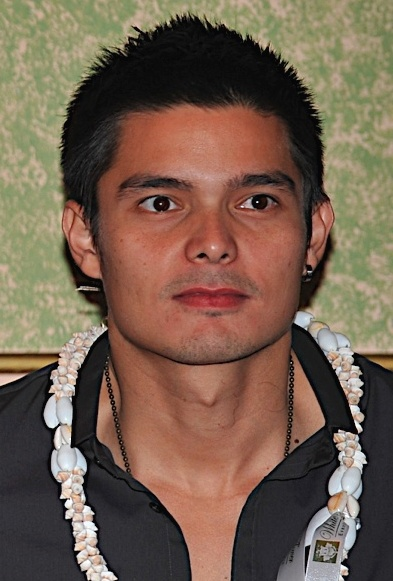
Dingdong Dantes portrays Prinsipe Raquim, originally played by Richard Gomez.

Portrayed by Dingdong Dantes.
Cousin of Haring Armeo, and father of Amihan II to Ynang Reyna Mine-a, Queen of Lireo. He is Mine-a's true love. Raquim was killed in the mortal world led by Hagorn, while trying to protect Amihan II, his daughter with Mine-a.While in the human world, he earns a living as a miner, which Sapiryans has the ability to detect and extract precious metals and gems, which made fellow miners jealous of him for his ability, and large payouts upon overseers.

- Armeo

Portrayed by Jestoni Alarcon, originally played by Ian Veneracion.
The father of Prinsipe Ybrahim, who was killed by King Arvak during the war of Sapiro and Lireo against Hathoria. Armeo was the original keeper of the Brilyante ng Lupa (Jewel of Earth).

- Ybrahim / Ybarro

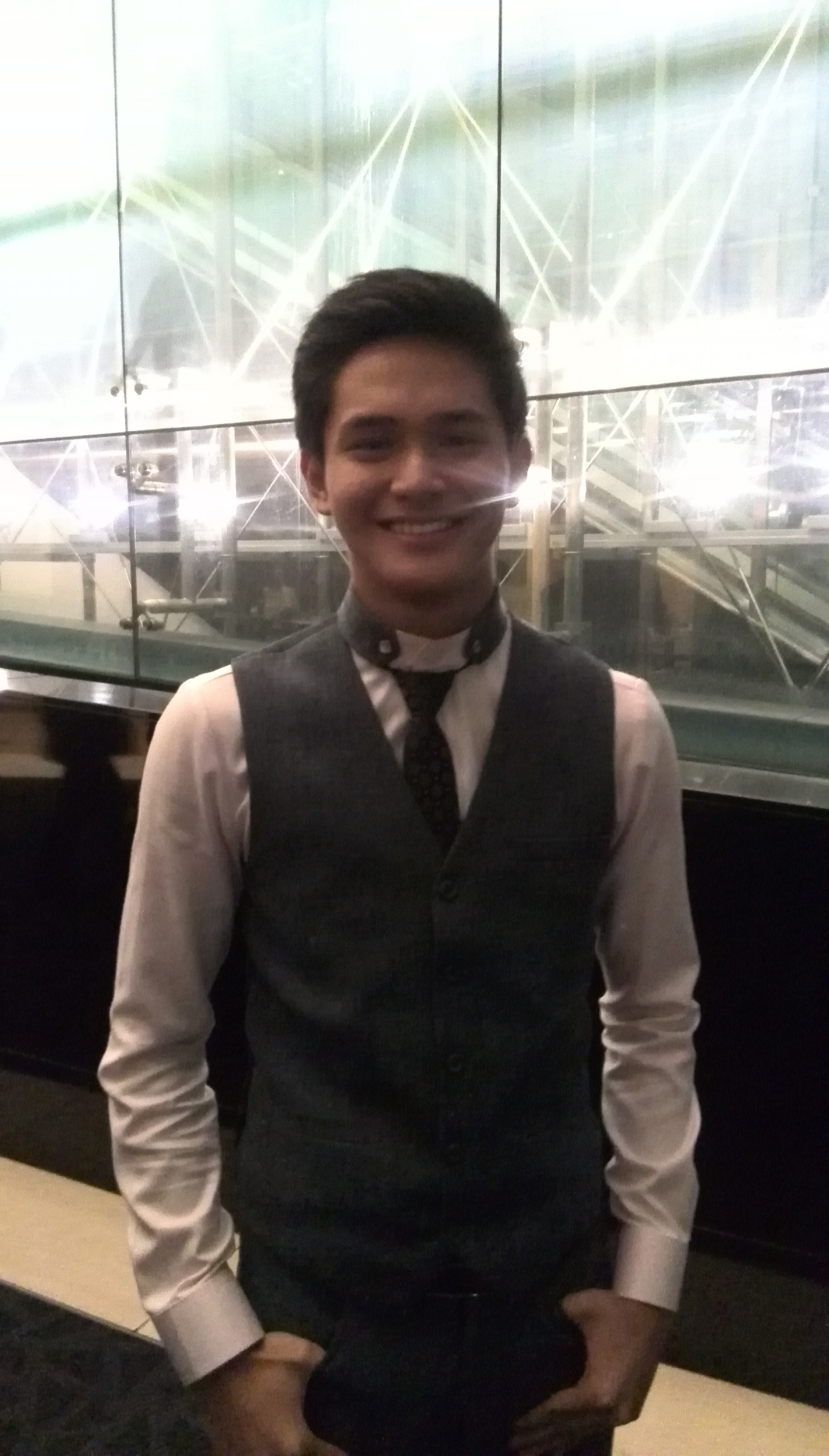
Ruru Madrid portrays Prinsipe Ybrahim, originally played by Dingdong Dantes.

Portrayed by Ruru Madrid.
The son of Haring Armeo, who, as an infant, was adopted by the chief of Mandirigma tribe, Apitong, after the fall of Sapiro. He is the father of Sang'gre Lira (to the Queen of Lireo, Hara Amihan) and Sang'gres Kahlil and Armea (both to Sang'gre Alena) A rightful heir to the throne of Sapiro and the uncle of Sang'gres Mira, Flamarra, Adamus, Gaeia and Terra. Ybrahim/Ybarro is also known as Kalasag. After the fall of Haring Hagorn, Ybrahim has now become the King of Sapiro. He carries Erra'Ordin (sword) as his main weapon along with Lira's Avatar.

- Asval

Portrayed by Neil Ryan Sese, originally played by Bobby Andrews.
One of the surviving Sapirians after the fall of Sapiro. The dark prince of Sapiro who wants himself to be the most powerful in Encantadia. Asval is the biggest traitor to Encantadia for killing Haring Arvak of Hathoria, attempting to kill the heir of Haring Armeo, and for killing Reyna Mine-a of Lireo, the biggest ally of Sapiro, that made the division of the Sang'gres later on. Asval was killed by Pirena after she learned that he killed her mother Mine-a. He was later revived by Arde and Ether, and currently allied with the revived kingdom of Etheria and later Hagorn. Under the orders of Bathalumang Ether and Hara Avria, Asval is responsible for the brutal and tragic deaths of Sang'gres Mira and Lira, as well as killing Wahid. He even attempted to kill Ariana, Hara Amihan's sarkosi (reincarnation). Killed by Rama Ybrahim during the last war, and beheaded.

- LilaSari

Portrayed by Diana Zubiri-Smith.
A cursed Diwata, with the power to transform anyone, who look at her beautiful face, into a stone. As an infant, LilaSari was adopted by Hara Cassiopei-a, who gave her a powerful mask to prevent her from harming other citizens of Lireo. Even though not a Sang'gre, she was once chosen by Cassiope-a to be the next Queen of Lireo, but because of her envious attitude, Cassiopea decided to decline her. LilaSari then attempted to kill her adopted mother, but she cannot overpower the queen. Cassiopea then sent LilaSari to Carcero for her crimes against the queen. Sang'gre Adhara obliged LilaSari to join her revolution against the Kingdom of Lireo. Later on, she became the 8th Queen of Lireo succeeding the enthronement of former Hara Pirena, and had a child with Haring Hagorn named Deshna. She lived with her newfound love Hitano in the mortal world to hide in the hands of Hagorn. After Hitano was killed by Hagorn, LilaSari wants to revenge against the diwatas. However, Cassiope-a revealed that LilaSari's blood has the power to redeem the Kingdom of Etheria. After being encountered by Bathalumang Ether, LilaSari was secretly sealed away and later revived by Ether, having a new image with her mask and her petrifying curse removed and has no memories of herself and her daughter Deshna. She is currently allied with the revived Etheria, but she and Amarro are seen to have a conscience. She was later revealed to be a Sapirian royalty who became a Lirean queen and was cursed by Bathalumang Haliya. She later returned to Lireo as an ally. She donned her Sapiryan Warrior and Dress during the final days of the Etherian War. She was once merged with Danaya using the Earth Gem, to create DanayaSari, a warrior so strong, it repelled Hathorian attacks.

- Asnara

Portrayed by Jaycee Parker.
The wife of Armeo and mother to King Ybrahim of Sapiro. She was the Queen Consort of Sapiro and once equipped a dagger, but was staked by Agane after killing her. She tried to heal herself but didn't survive, so she told Apitong to take Ybarro to adopt him.

- Armea

Portrayed by Ysabel Ortega, originally played by Jackie Rice.
The Queen of Sapiro. Daughter of Alena and Ybrahim. Sister to Kahlil, and half-sister to Sang'gres Adamus, and Lira. She is the niece of Sang'gre Pirena, Amihan II, and Danaya, and the cousin of Sang'gres Mira, Flamarra, Gaiea, and Terra. In Encantadia Chronicles: Sang'gre, she became the queen of Sapiro after her father, Ybrahim, died. Sang'gre Lira's Daughter, Cassandra is also her niece.

=== Sapirian Army ===
- Mayca

Portrayed by Cheska Iñigo.
Mayca was a prisoner in Carcero, along with her sister Kaizan. Together with Kaizan and LilaSari, they joined Sang'gre Adhara's revolution against the Kingdom of Lireo. After Adhara's death, Mayca later became the Mashna of the Army of Sapiro.

- Alira Naswen

Portrayed by Julianne Lee.
One of the surviving Sapirians after the fall of Sapiro. Alira Naswen headed the other surviving Sapirian soldiers as they relocated to Lireo, the allied kingdom of Sapiro. She is shown to have a romantic interest with Aquil, the Head of the Lirean Army. She is the romantic rival of Sang'gre Danaya for Aquil. She betrayed Lireo due to her jealousy of the relationship between Danaya and Aquil. She was later killed after being struck down by a Hathor. She is later seen as one of the ivtres in Devas and helped the kingdoms in the final war along with other spirits.

- Kaizan

Portrayed by Mara Alberto.
A prisoner in Carcero, Kaizan is Mayca's younger sister. They joined Sang'gre Adhara's revolution against Lireo to bring it down. After Adhara's death, Kaizan later became second-in-command of the Sapiryan army. Fatally slashed and stabbed by an Etherian soldier and died during the battle of Etheria-Sapiro-Hathor war.

- Dagtum

Portrayed by Edwin Reyes, originally played by Gerard Pizzaras.
One of the surviving Sapirians after the fall of Sapiro, who sided with Prinsipe Asval. He now works with Rama Ybrahim. Killed with Axilom during the Hadezar war.

- Axilom

originally played by Brad Turvey.
Axilom is a subordinate of Asval. He joins Asval's party after the destruction of Sapiro, whilst most of the Sapiryan survivors had joined Alira Naswen. After Asval's death, Axilom, along with Dagtum, eventually sides with Rehav Ybrahim and returns his loyalty to Sapiro. Dagtum and Axilom are killed by the Hadezars during the war against Hagorn's Hadezar army.

=== Other Sapirian ===
- Enuo

Portrayed by Rafa Siguion-Reyna, originally played by Andrei Felix.
A brave Sapirian hunter, chosen by Bathalang Emre to be the father of Lireo's Reyna Mine-a's third and fourth children, Sang'gre Alena and Sang'gre Danaya. He once saved the infant Sang'gre Amihan II from an attempted assassination by Gurna. He currently lives in the mortal world, where he assisted his daughter, Danaya, as well as Muyak, into going back to Encantadia. In the later part in the series, Enuo finally saw his other daughter Alena. He stayed on human world as a researcher for good, alongside other Encantados.

=== Mulawins ===
==== Avila ====
- Pagaspas

Portrayed by Miguel Tanfelix.
A young Mulawin in training, who aided Hara Amihan on her request to find the missing Ybarro. He was the lone survivor of the Mulawin genocide, orchestrated by Haring Hagorn of Hathoria. He is a Tabon (Half-Human-Half-Mulawin). (Pagaspas is an original character from the TV Series Mulawin, and its preceding film, also played by Tanfelix. He also reprised his role in Mulawin versus Ravena.)

==== Avalon ====
- Lakan

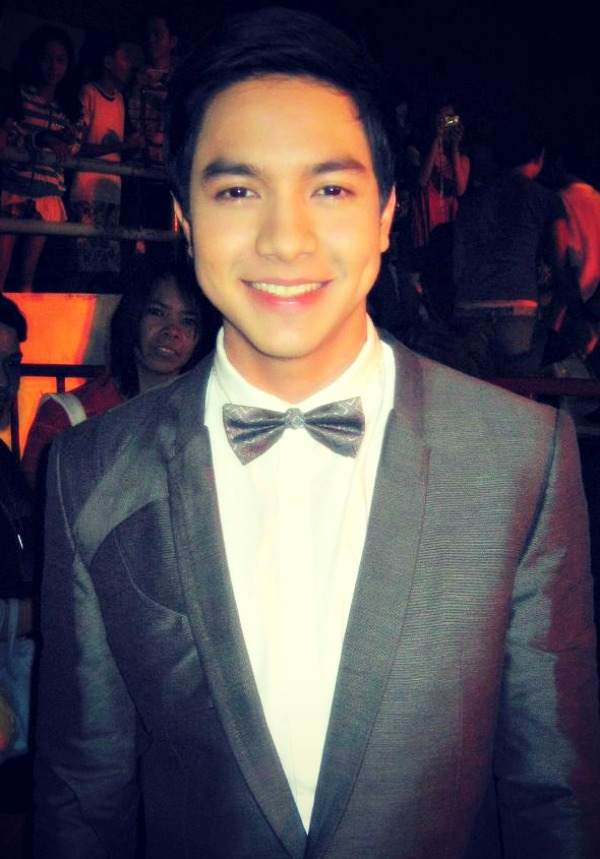
Alden Richards portrays Lakan.

Portrayed by Alden Richards.
A Mulawin living in the mortal world, not particularly in Avila, who will fight for the Diwatas. He assisted the Sang'gres Danaya and Lira into their journey to return in Encantadia. His mother, siblings, wife, and child died during the Mulawin genocide by Haring Hagorn of Hathoria. He carries Tarik (combat spear and shuriken).

=== Adjantao (Mandirigma) ===
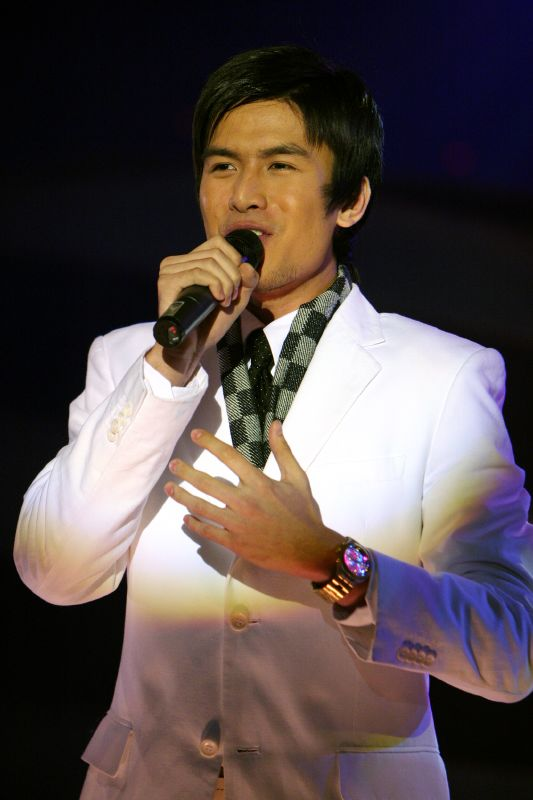
Christian Bautista portrays Apitong, chief of Mandirigma tribe, originally played by John Regala.

- Apitong

Portrayed by Christian Bautista.
The chief of Mandirigma tribe. As a request by the dying Queen Asnara of Sapiro, he took care of Prinsipe Ybrahim as his own son. His fate is deeply unknown.

- Asnara

Portrayed by Jaycee Parker.
Asnara is the wife of Apitong, leader of the mandirigmas. She feared that Apitong would be punished if it became known that he had taken a prince of Sapiro. Apitong replies that no one would know if they all keep their mouths shut. When she died, Apitong did not remarry.

- Wantuk

Portrayed by Buboy Villar, originally played by Marky Lopez.
Ybarro's friend and companion. Wantuk uses spear as his main weapon for fighting.

- Pakô

Portrayed by James Teng, originally played by Michael Roy Jornales as Apek.
One of Ybarro's friends and companions. Just like Wantuk, he also uses spear. Pakô was killed by Hagorn in war during the fall of Lireo.

- Lusog

Lusog is an Encantado acquaintance of Apitong. He witnessed Adhara absorbing another Encantado's life force and reports it to Alena and her party.

=== Askanos (Barbaros) ===
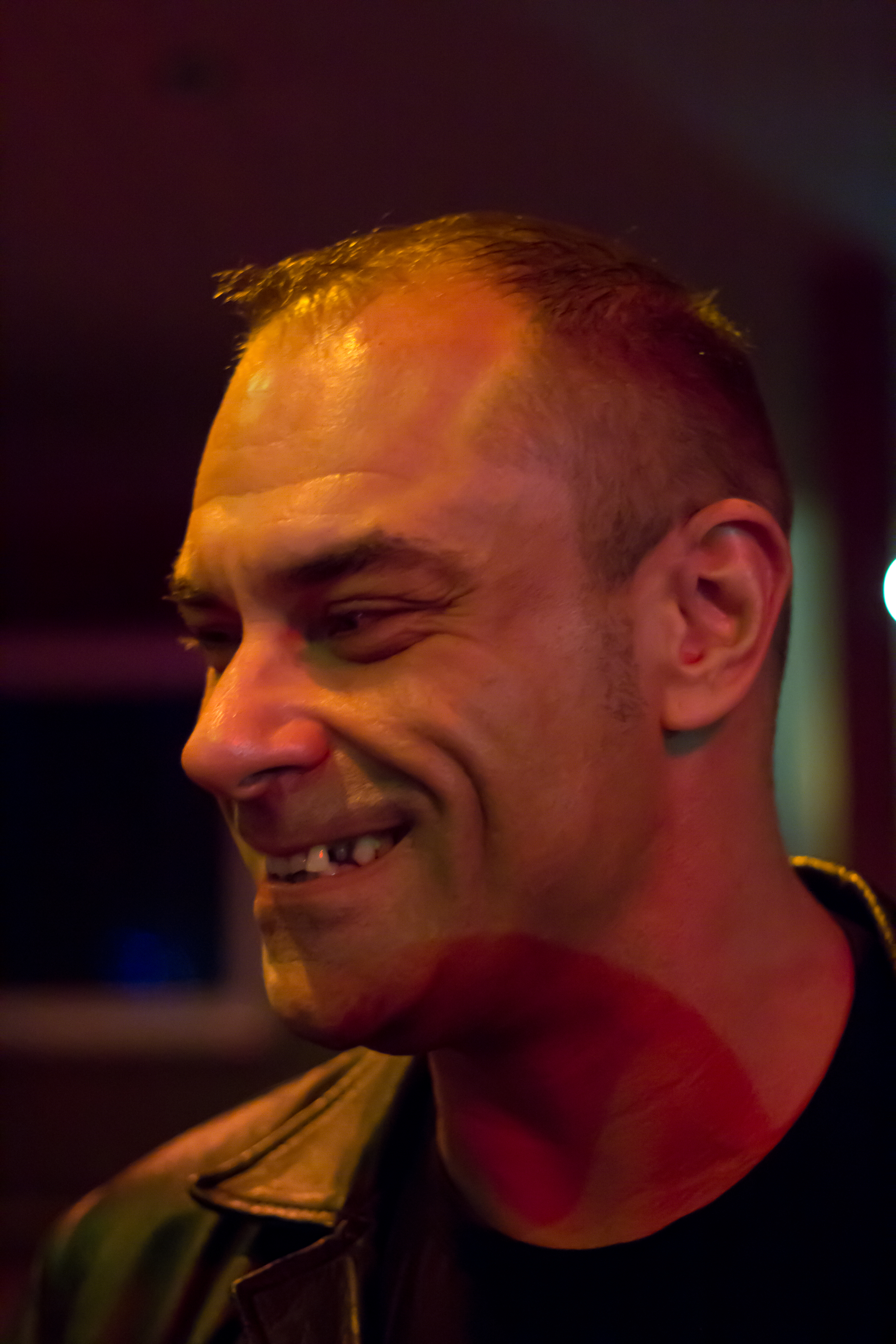
Conan Stevens portrays Vish'ka

- Vish'ka

Portrayed by Conan Stevens.
The leader of Ascano. Vish'ka was a friend of Sang'gre Adhara, whom he also made her powerful weapon Lupig. He betrayed Adhara after the supposedly long dead Sang'gre resurfaced, by sending Adhara to the Lirean guards. Vish'ka is also responsible for creating Sang'gre Lira's armor. He was killed by Haring Hagorn. Later returns as an Ivtre and fought Hadezars.

- Wahid

Portrayed by Andre Paras, originally played by the actor and his father Benjie Paras.
Vish'ka's right-hand man, who makes business with the Kalasag by collecting gathered weapons in exchange for golds. He is a friend of Ybrahim/Ybarro and the Sang'gres Lira and Mira. Stabbed in the back by Asval while he was trying to help Mira escape when the Etherian Mashnas attacked the island of Cassiopei-a. He remains as a fresh corpse with Lira, Mira, and Gilas after Arde, Ether, and Keros took over Devas.

- Blanco

Blanco is a barbaro. He is a subordinate of Vish'ka. He initially stopped Adhara from seeing Vish'ka, but eventually recognized Adhara when she showed her face. Following Vish'ka's orders, he later delivered Adhara to Hitano, so that Adhara could be imprisoned in Carcero.

- Bausug

Bausug is one of the barbaros who assisted Ybrahim during Pirena's occupation of Sapiro. He suggested bombing the western side of the Great Fort, where Pirena was encamped, but this was rejected by Ybrahim because the throne and the treasures of Sapiro were located there. He later advised Ybrahim that they could not contend against the Water Gem, but Amihan and Alena later arrived to help them. During the melee, Pirena captured him and held him hostage.

=== Bandidos ===
- Vardos and Pangil

Portrayed by
Encantadia marauders leader from the outskirts of the Lavanea mountainous territory, are criminally inclined "enkantado".

- Group of Bandidos

Portrayed by
They live in the north forest of Sapiro, in the outskirts of the volcanic and mountainous territory of Lavanea They are also responsible for most disappearances of innocent denizens from both the lands Encantadia and the realm of mortals. Their residence has a tent and some logs for the Bandito / Humans to sit. At the night, they use some logs to make a campfire. They guard the Lagusan ng Pagkaligaw.

=== Punjabwes ===
- Azulan

Portrayed by Marx Topacio, originally played by Jay R.
Arianna's fiery fugitive brother. He is shown to have a love-hate romantic interest to Hara Pirena of Hathoria. In the finale, he marries Pirena and have a child named Flamarra. The Sang'gres Amihan, Alena Danaya and the deceased Diwani of Hathoria and Sapiro Deshna was already her sister-in-law's. It is presumed that he succeeded Manik as the next Rehav of Punjabwe tribe and a Royal Consort of Hathoria after his marriage to Pirena.

- Rehav Manik

Portrayed by Joross Gamboa.
The traitor Punjabwe Prince who forcefully and desperate to marry the Punjabwe "sarkosi" of Hara Amihan, Arianna. He even tried to kill the new gem-keepers, and almost sided to Etherians. He died as a Punjabwe-Lirean hero to pay for his sins. He returned as an Ivtre to fight the Hadezars on the last war.

- Arianna

Portrayed by Arra San Agustin.
Azulan's sister. She was initially betrothed to be Rehav Manik's wife, but during her attempt to save Azulan from the Etherians, she was stabbed to death by Andora (in Agane's body). However, Arianna was revived back to life when the Ivtre (soul) of Amihan entered her body as its new vessel. She was chosen as the new guardian of the Brilyante ng Hangin. She still don't realize among with her fellow Encantados that she is Amihan's sarkosi. She died after Hagorn stabbed her when he noticed to being Amihan's sarkosi, not until she retrieved the Gems that she owned and used. She currently in Devas alongside Deshna, Muyak, Hitano and others as an ivtre by which she offered to Emre from her being wisdom to bringing back to Amihan as an ivtre again and to visit Ybrahim and Lira in Lireo. After her older brother Azulan's marriage to Hara Pirena of Hathoria, their daughter Flamarra is already her niece.

- Mantal Isman

Portrayed by Via Antonio, originally played by Marnie Lapuz.
The Babaylan of the Punjabwes, a female punjabwean that headed the search for Prince Manik's soon-to-be wife. After Arianna's death, she prayed to Dea (Bathala) Emre to accept her in Devas. When Arianna gets resurrected through Amihan's ivtre she gets called by another Punjabwean as "Babaylan" (priestess). She is also known to be Rosas, the Punjabwe psychic.

== Hathoria ==
=== Royal Hathor ===
- Bartimus

originally played by Nonie Buencamino.
Bartimus is the first ruler of Hathoria, the father of Arvak and Hagorn's grandfather. It is said that the generals of the Hathor army uphold the bloodline of Bartimus. He is Deshna's ancestor. Bartimus believed that the omnipotence of the Inang Brilyante will only be wasted in the hands of the "Diwata" race. A believe Hagorn has adapted. He forged the blood forged sword, Elores, using red metal ore drenched with his blood. The Elores was inherited from Bartimus. A blood forge weapon links itself to its master by blood or lineage. It was forged from red metal ore drenched with the blood of Bartimus, father of Arvak, whose lineage the sword only recognizes. It feeds on anger or any strong emotion for it to be effective in battle. It has again proven itself in the hands of Hagorn defeating the valiant prince of Sapiro, Raquim and the Spirit forge, Arkrey.

- Arvak

Portrayed by Roi Vinzon, originally played by Al Tantay.
The original keeper of the Brilyante ng Apoy (Jewel of Fire), the father of Hagorn, and the grandfather of Sang'gre Pirena and Deshna. Arvak was killed by Prinsipe Asval during the war of Brilyantes between Hathoria, Lireo and Sapiro.

- Hagorn

Portrayed by John Arcilla, originally played by Pen Medina.
The crowned King of Hathoria and a wicked sorcerer of Encantadia. After the death of his father Arvak. He was originally betrothed to Mine-a. Hagorn is the father of Mine-a's eldest child, Sang'gre Pirena, and grandfather to Sang'gre Mira and Pirena's second daughter to Azulan, Sang'gre Flamarra. He is also the father of Deshna/Luna by LilaSari. He is responsible for the death of Amihan. Hagorn was stabbed by his own daughter, Pirena, but was later found alive and escaped his tightly guarded prison, with the help of Ether and Avria. Keeper of Elores and Ether's bertud which can summon a fiery three-headed dragon. She even attempted to kill her oldest daughter Pirena and successfully killed her youngest lovechild, Deshna for betraying him. He was killed by Raquim's Ivtre after being stabbed by Ariana / Amihan and the Gems stolen away from him.

- Deshna / Luna

Portrayed by Inah de Belen.
She is the daughter of LilaSari and Hagorn. She is a diwani of Hathoria and was baptized as a Nymfa. She is also the younger paternal half-sister of Queen Pirena. She is the aunt of Mira and Pirena's Second daughter to Azulan, Flamarra. She was raised by Helgad, at the request of the Diwatas and Cassiopeia, after Hagorn attacked and killed Hitano and wounded LilaSari. She was chosen as the new guardian of the Brilyante ng Apoy. She is a royal Hathor and Sapiryan with a Diwata blood. She has a pet friend argona. She was killed by her own father Hagorn after betraying him just like Pirena. She is later seen as an Ivtre from Devas and is reunited with LilaSari.

=== Hathorian Army ===
- Agane

Portrayed by Rochelle Pangilinan-Solinap, originally played by Leila Kuzma.
Hagorn's half-sister and lady-general (Mashna-de) of the Hathor army. She was finally killed by Danaya. However, her body was later resurrected by Ether and Arde as the vessel of Hera Andora from Sensa, Etheria.

- Rexar

Portrayed by Mike Lloren.
Rexad or Rexar is one of the generals (Mashna) of Hathoria. He was summoned by Hagorn following the disappearance of Agane. He compliments Hagorn for catching Gurna's spying.

== Etheria ==
=== Hara ===
- Evil Queen Avria

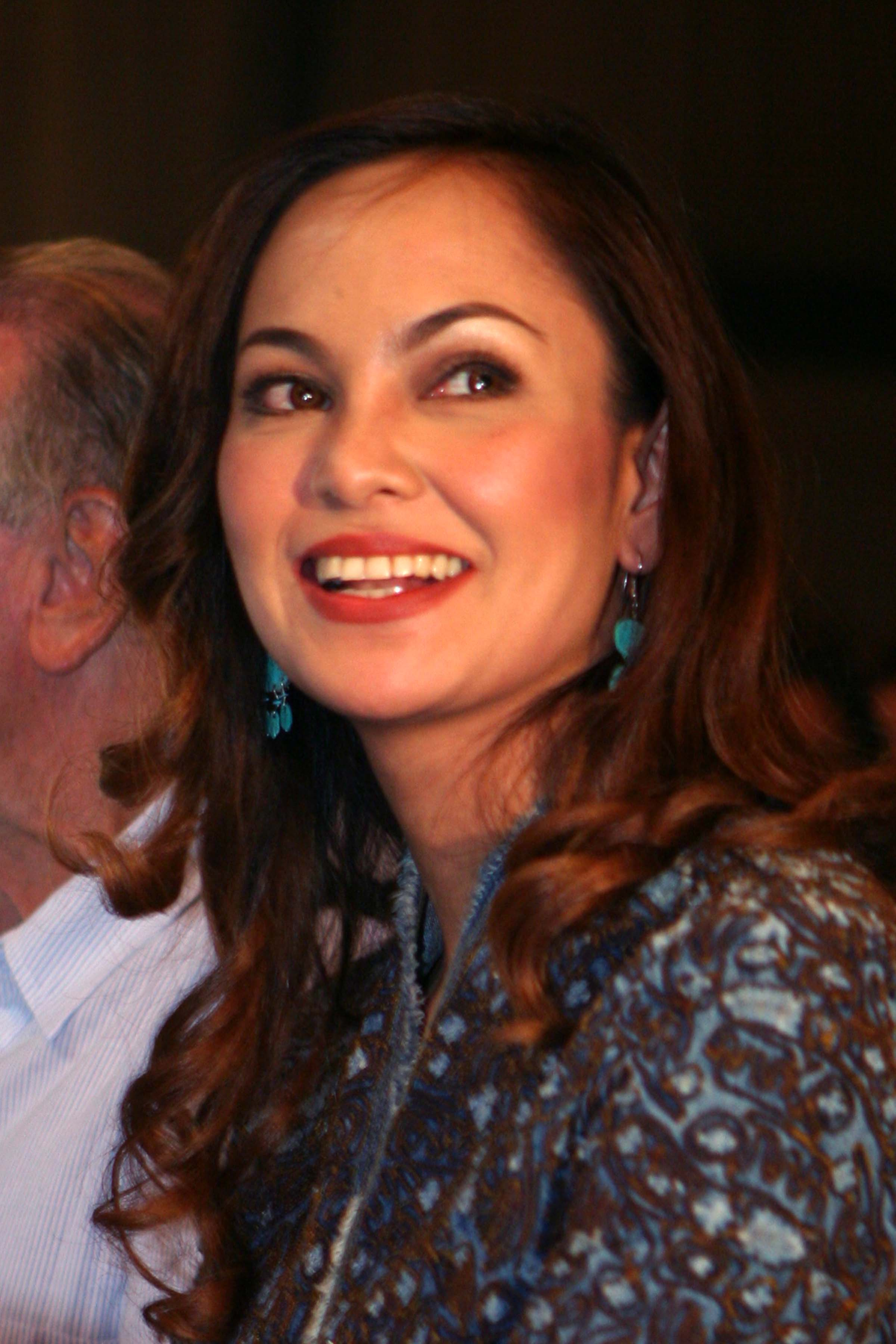
Eula Valdez portrays Reyna Avria, originally played by Francine Prieto.

Portrayed by Eula Valdez, Solenn Heussaff-Bolzico (young).
The powerful, power-hungry, ruthless, ancient, mesmerizing, manipulative, and fatal Queen and Sorceress of the Queendom of Etheria, who is resurrected by Bathalumang Ether through her blood dripping on the skeletal remains. She is the ruler of Hera Andal, the capital territory of Etheria. Avria initially possessed Cassiope-a's body to start her evil plans, but was eventually able to recreate her own body through Cassiope-a's power, left and placed in Etherian casket for three days. She is currently revived again by Ether using the Brilyante ng Diwa, donned her new armor and the sword of new Kabilan. She died for the second time after Hagorn used the golden hourglass to split her body between the past and future times.

=== Heran ===
- Hera Andora

Portrayed by Rochelle Pangilinan (temporary vessel), originally played by Alessandra De Rossi.
Andora is a citizen and Hera from Hera Sensa - an Etherian tribe known for their denizens abilities to control using the mind and other mental or psychic powers. She is resurrected by Bathalumang Ether into the corpse of Agane. Until now, she is still possessing Agane's revived dead body as her vessel of her resurrected spirit. She is in love with the Sapirian royal kinsman traitor, Asval. She was finally killed by Alena through a poisonous liquid.

- Hera Juvila

Portrayed by Jinri Park, originally played by Jopay Paguia.
Juvila is a citizen and Hera from Hera Volo - an Etherian tribe known for their ability to enhance their speed and control time. She only made a cameo appearance via an illustration flashback in Episode 157. She is equipped with a staff named Tanikala. Her staff can produce windy storm or purple flames. She can fly and can be invisible. That's why she was known to be Sang'gre Amihan II's greatest rival. She is a champion during the glory of Etheria. She killed the former Bunggaitan Esmeralda. She is a ruthless berserker wherein she is the ancestor of Mashna-de Duryé Agane and Mashna-de Duryé Alira Naswen. She was finally killed by Aquil and Mira by close combat.

- Hera Odessa

Portrayed by Sheree Bautista, originally played by Pauleen Luna.
Odessa is a citizen and Hera from Etheria's most mysterious tribe, Hera Aega - an Etherian tribe known for their ability to control or manipulate someone's emotion and let anyone explode or trap in a deep sleep through a mystic bow and arrow. She only made a cameo appearance via an illustration flashback in Episode 157. She died for the second time due to the easily fatal stab by Hara Danaya. Her mystic bow and arrow has more abilities. She has the superhuman strength that makes her wicked and depicts her ruthlessness.

=== Other Etherians ===
- Evades

Portrayed by Ces Aldaba, originally played by Chinggoy Alonzo.
A plant-like man who will help anyone who can answer his riddle. Leaves from the Tree of Life, that are able to heal and resurrect anyone. He was killed by Andora along with Avria's orders after he warned Pirena about the imminent Etherian danger. He is from Hera Sensa.

- Memen

Portrayed by Wendell Ramos, originally played by Tonton Gutierrez.
Avria's husband and Lip-aya is his mistress. He briefly appeared on a flashback in the ancient Etheria and he also attempted to go to the present time. He was slain by Amihan during the Great Encantadian War. In the original series, Memen rose to the throne as a consort King and being a half-Diwata half-Etherian, but in this version, he is just a noble from Sensa and Andal. In the spin-off series, Encantadia Chronicles: Sang'gre, Cassiopeia, and Mitena are her daughters with Ornia.

== Mine-a-ve ==
- Olgana

Portrayed by Bianca Manalo.
The mother of Sang'gre Deia. One of Mitena’s trusted generals.

- Zaur

Portrayed by Gabby Eigenmann.
Mitena’s might incarnate.

- Daron

Portrayed by Jon Lucas.
Under Mitena’s command, and Zaur's leadership.

- Veshdita

Portrayed by Shuvee Etrata.
One of Olgana’s most skilled warrior. Deia’s childhood friend.

- Kosshava

Portrayed by Billie Hakenson.
Kosshava believes that she is the finest warrior Mine-a-ve has ever known.

- Ednu

Portrayed by Jamie Wilson.
He serves Mitena with ruthless loyalty, a predator bred to track the Sang'gres with brutal precision.

== Mortal world ==
=== Lazarus ===
- Amanda

Portrayed by Angelu de Leon-Rivera, originally played by Irma Adlawan.
The adoptive mother of Milagros (Sang'gre Lira) and wife of Dado. Her husband died after he accidentally fell off the bridge saving Mila. She became hot-headed and keeps on blaming Mila but eventually forgave her. She was brainwashed, threatened, and manipulated by his own brother who is a syndicate. She died in the arms of her adoptive daughter after Berto's accidental shot that was supposed for Mila.

- Dado

Portrayed by Leandro Baldemor, originally played by Allan Paule.
The kind-hearted and cheerful adoptive father of Milagros (Sang'gre Lira), who died after he fell from the bridge for saving the young Milagros.

- Berto

Portrayed by Ryan Eigenmann
Amanda's brother and adoptive uncle of Milagros. He discovered Mila's powers and uses it for stealing. He, his henchmen, and Amanda are the only ones who know that Mila differs from them. He suspects that Mila befriends a mystic pixie Muyak. He was killed by the vigilantes.

- Rosing

Portrayed by Carmen del Rosario
Montecarlo's comic but superstitious household Mayordoma.

- Jigs

Portrayed by John Feir
Raquim's friend and co-worker in the mortal world. He is the husband of Choleng, and godfather of Amihan while she was still living in the human world with her father. He is a miner and Raquim's colleague who used to be Raquim's defender.

- Choleng

Portrayed by Joanna Marie Katanyag
Jigs' superstitious wife who used to babysit the infant Amihan in the mortal world. She suspects that Raquim is from a rich family from a faraway country that made him differ from them with his language, healing, and gold detection.

- Jessica

Portrayed by Marlann Flores
The superstitious and opinionated personal yaya of Anthony who lost her insanity when she witnessed the glowing eyes and ivictus of Mira, including the mystic appearance of Hara Amihan to her lost heiresses.

- Salome

Portrayed by Tanya Gomez
Pao-Pao's domineering and abusive aunt. She was the one and only left blood-related of Pao-Pao after his parents were killed by holdapers. She witnessed herself becoming a witch-like after the sagisag of the Soul Gem cursed her for maltreating the symbol and Paopao, her caring, storyteller, child-like, but kind-hearted nephew.

=== Lavish ===
- Anthony Monteclaro

Portrayed by Migo Adecer (young), Andy Smith (adult), originally played by Mark Herras.
The wealthy friend of Milagros (Lira) and Mira in the human world. Anthony was the love interest of Mira. Many years have passed, Mira and Lira visits to the mortal world for the last time when they learned that Anthony is already married. Anthony was the final one who discovers Mira and Lira's true heritage and nature's identity.

- Dina

Portrayed by Lindsay de Vera
A cunning and vicious ex-girlfriend of Anthony who wreaks havoc to Lira and Mira in the mortal world. She has this point of view and interest that Lira and Mira is not humans like them.

- Silvia Monteclaro

Portrayed by Arny Ross
Dina's accomplice and Anthony's cunning and ambitious secretary who despises and makes Mila's life more challenging. She works as a prostitute for TMP (the chief boss company owner).

- Banjo

Portrayed by Nar Cabico
The friend of Mila in the company who teases her to Anthony. He is one of the hosts of Encantadia Facebook Live Sessions who briefly appeared on the show.

- Kyle

Portrayed by Victor Harry
The comic and skeptical sidekick and confidante of Anthony who likes Mila.

- Louie

Portrayed by Kyle Vergara
He is TMP's arrogant youngest son who likes Mira but dislikes Mila. He is one of the Starstruck contestants and finalists who briefly appeared on the show.

== Deities ==
=== Celestials ===
- Emre

Played by Rey Talosig and Zoren Legaspi, originally played by Raymond Bagatsing.
The faceless supreme deity of Encantadia. He was originally the God of Spirituality and of Time and Space and the Supreme leader of Devas, the Heaven of Encantadia. Later in Encantado form after he was exiled by the evil deities, and now he is in an ongoing quest battling the forces of evil along with Cassiope-a and his worshippers. He is the creator of the Inang Brilyante. He returned to Divine form, killed Arde, and reduced Ether to a snake. He rewarded Cassiopei-a's sacrifice by transforming her into a Bathaluman.

- Ether

Portrayed by Janice Hung, originally played by Angel Aquino.
The evil deity of Etheria, the fallen kingdom of Encantadia and once originally the Goddess of Creation, Physicality and Being. She revived Etheria from its demise and is now working with Hara Avria and Hera Andora (in Agane's temporary body). She owns a Bertud (sword) that can summon a three-headed wild dragon and she gave it to Hagorn as a gift. She is the de facto Bathaluman of Devas along with Arde and formerly with Keros. Became a snake by Emre after being defeated by Danaya, Pirena, and Alena and Emre was turned her into a normal snake.

- Arde

Voiced by Regit Antonio, originally played by Bart Guingona and Simon Ibarra.
The evil deity of Balaak, the Hell of Encantadia and once originally the God of Emotions, Energy and Transformation. In his dragon spirit form, Arde has already appeared to Adhara, Hagorn, Lira, Mira, Wantuk, Imaw, Cassiope-a, Andora, Odessa, Juvila, and Wahid. He manipulated the quintessence of Mira and Lira, to be used to battle the Haras. He is deeply in love with Ether that lead him into dark tendencies.

- Keros

Portrayed by Ian De Leon
He is the God of Destruction, Slaughter, Anger, and Death. He resides in a dead island away from the continent of Encantadia named Binyaan. He was manipulated by the other evil deities then he came back to Encantadia and helped Ether and Arde in overtaking Devas. He manipulated the quintessence of Minea's Ivtre, to be used to battle the Haras. He was deeply betrayed and killed by Arde along with Ether's orders.

- Haliya

Portrayed by Valeen Montenegro
The introverted Goddess whom Emre will seek help to regain Devas again and to overpower the evil deities. She resides in the twin moon of Encantadia as she is known to be the Adamyan moon goddess and once originally the Goddess of Wisdom and the Mind. She formerly carries a trident called De-jar which has the ability to slaughter a Bathaluman or Bathala. She was the one who cursed LilaSari. She was the one who created the kambal-diwas of Emre's mother gem. She is the first good Bathaluman opposite the evil deity Ether. She often fights Ether for peace, justice, and refuge.

- Cassiopei-a

Portrayed by Solenn Heussaff-Bolzico, originally played by Cindy Kurleto.
Ancient Fairy Sorceress, the very first Diwata made by Emre along with Ether's creations, the Etherians; she is the Bunggaitan of Encantadia or the most powerful after the Sang'gre Duryé Esmeralda's death. After her endless-like tough challenges, and after she heroically defeated the evil deity Bathaluman, along with her feisty and wise personality, determination, wisdom, and abilities. She finally became the very first Encantada and the second good Bathaluman who will help the Diwatas and its allies to defeat the evilness and their challenges. She is the romantic lover of Emre after their unique-tough challenges brought to them by the evil deities. She was temporarily killed by Bathalang Arde. In the finale of the season 1 of the series, she was briefly resurrected by Emre to be a Bathaluman of Love and Protection. It was revealed that Cassiopei-a has a villain mystic-made twin named Mitena.
