= Adhara, Bangladesh =

Adhara
- Location in Bangladesh
- Coordinates: 23°23′N 90°47′E
- Country: Bangladesh
- Division: Chittagong Division
- District: Chandpur District
- Time zone: UTC+6 (Bangladesh Time)

Adhara is a village in Chandpur District in the Chittagong Division of eastern Bangladesh.
