= ADARA Networks =

American software company

ADARA networks
- Company type: privately held company
- Industry: Software
- Founded: 1998
- Headquarters: San Jose, CA
- Key people: Eric Johnson (CEO)
- Products: Software-defined networking orchestration software; Cloud computing
- Website: adaranetworks.com

Adara Networks (stylized as "ADARA Networks") is an American software company.

== History ==
The company creates software-defined networking (SDN) infrastructure orchestration software and provides cloud computing. It has several dozen partners in its channel program. Adara's cloud software includes an SDI Visualizer for topological rendering, an SLA Manager for determining cost efficiency, and use Sirius Routers. Afterwards the company developed its Horizon SDA Platform, which has an Ecliptic SDN controller, Axis vSwitch, SoftSwitch, and cloud computing engine.

In 2008 Adara developed a networking electronic medical records project for the US Congress. Adara has served on Industry Advisory Panels for the Congress as well.

The company has held contracts with the Department of Defense, and spent its first ten years or so working in the public sphere before opening up to private companies, including SMEs, in 2011.

In 2012 Adara created a full stack network for its cloud, and in 2013 its controller became open source. Then in 2016, Adara partnered with Calient Technologies to develop an integrated SD-WAN. The company's CEO is Eric Johnson.

iN 2020 ADARA Networks were acknowledged as an Industry Leader in SDN.
