= List of Karelasyon episodes =

Karelasyon is a weekly anthology of inspiring stories on GMA Network aired every Saturday. Karelasyon features the life experiences of famous personalities and ordinary people who loved and lost on their way to success. The show is presented by Carla Abellana.

== Series overview ==
Year	Episodes	Originally released	
Year	Episodes	First released	Last released
2015	38	April 11, 2015	December 26, 2015
2016	52	January 2, 2016	December 31, 2016
2017	18	January 7, 2017	May 13, 2017

== Episode list ==
=== 2015 ===
No.	Title	Cast	Directed by	Written by	Original release date
1	"Pilot"	Mark Herras: Daniel; Mylene Dizon: Minda	Adolfo Alix Jr.	Adolfo Alix Jr.	April 11, 2015
Supporting Cast: Martin del Rosario
2	"Losyang"	Valerie Concepcion: Tere	Rember Gelera	Onay Sales	April 18, 2015
Supporting Cast: Marco Alcaraz, Pinky Amador
3	"Instant Baby"	Kris Bernal: Lily; Rocco Nacino: Paul	Zig Dulay	Danzen Santos	April 25, 2015
Supporting Cast: Karen delos Reyes
4	"Mama's Boy"	Louise delos Reyes: Abby; Kristofer Martin: Marcus	Adolfo Alix Jr.	Adolfo Alix Jr.	May 2, 2015
Supporting Cast: Jaclyn Jose
5	"Postpartum"	Dennis Padilla: Ariel	Michael Christian Cardoz	Michael Christian Cardoz	May 9, 2015
Supporting Cast: Candy Pangilinan
6	"Sugar Daddy"	LJ Reyes: Girlie	Paul Sta. Ana	Gay Ace Domingo	May 16, 2015
Supporting Cast: JC Tiuseco
7	"Scandal"	Lovi Poe: Marose; Benjamin Alves: Brando	Zig Dulay	Zig Dulay	May 23, 2015
Supporting Cast: Carl Guevara
8	"Kasambahay"	Roi Vinzon: Lloyd	Rember Gelera	Danzen Santos	May 30, 2015
Supporting Cast: Melissa Mendez, Mercedes Cabral, Stephanie Sol
9	"Kambal"	Derrick Monasterio: TJ; Jeric Gonzales: AJ	Adolfo Alix Jr.	Adolfo Alix Jr.	June 6, 2015
Supporting Cast: Lauren Young, Sharmaine Arnaiz
10	"Mrs. Husband"	Perla Bautista: Sonia; Allan Paule: Anton	Adolfo Alix Jr.	Ralston Jover	June 13, 2015
Supporting Cast: Bing Pimentel, Julian Trono, Miggs Cuaderno
11	"Karma"	Aljur Abrenica: Marco/Jericho; Kris Bernal: Monique/Anna	Adolfo Alix Jr.	Adolfo Alix Jr.	June 20, 2015
Supporting Cast: Dindi Gallardo
12	"Martir"	Max Collins: Emily; Rafael Rosell: Alvin	Paul Sta. Ana	Onay Sales	June 27, 2015
Supporting Cast: Vaness del Moral
13	"Batang Ina"	Renz Valerio: Lorenz; Krystal Reyes: Mela	Zig Dulay	Zig Dulay	July 4, 2015
Supporting Cast: Maureen Larrazabal, Maria Isabel Lopez
14	"Tres Rosas"	Nora Aunor: Maring	Adolfo Alix Jr.	Adolfo Alix Jr.	July 11, 2015
Supporting Cast: Lotlot De Leon, Janine Gutierrez
15	"Talent"	Alden Richards: Adrian; Louise delos Reyes: Veronica	Adolfo Alix Jr.	Jerome Zamora	July 18, 2015
Supporting Cast: Bembol Roco
16	"CCTV"	Mark Herras: Julio; Solenn Heussaff: Anne	Adolfo Alix Jr.	Ralston Jover	July 25, 2015
Supporting Cast: Fabio Ide
17	"Sir"	Bea Binene: Minnie Montes	Rember Gelera	Danzen Santos	August 1, 2015
Supporting Cast: TJ Trinidad, Ash Ortega, Lovely Rivero
18	"Bayaw"	Yasmien Kurdi: Belen	Michael Christian Cardoz	Michael Christian Cardoz	August 8, 2015
Supporting Cast: Paolo Contis, James Blanco
19	"Cougar"	Hiro Peralta: Miko	Paul Sta. Ana	Honeylyn Joy Alipio	August 15, 2015
Supporting Cast: Diana Zubiri, Katya Santos
20	"Coma"	Max Collins: Lara; Rodjun Cruz: Ricky	Adolfo Alix Jr.	Ralston Jover	August 22, 2015
Supporting Cast: Chynna Ortaleza, Melissa Mendez
21	"Unhappy Wife"	Jackie Rice: Marie	Rember Gelera	Honeylyn Joy Alipio	August 29, 2015
Supporting Cast: Carlos Agassi
22	"Laro"	Andrea Torres: Michelle; Martin del Rosario: Joshua	Rember Gelera	Honeylyn Joy Alipio	September 5, 2015
Supporting Cast: Stephanie Sol, Mark McMahon
23	"Tuhog"	LJ Reyes: Melissa	Zig Dulay	Zig Dulay	September 12, 2015
Supporting Cast: Ryza Cenon, Pancho Magno
24	"Baliw"	Sid Lucero: Elmer	Michael Christian Cardoz	Michael Christian Cardoz	September 19, 2015
Supporting Cast: Louise delos Reyes
25	"Sulot"	Gio Alvarez: Mico	Paul Sta. Ana	Jon Verzosa	September 26, 2015
Supporting Cast: Jade Lopez, Kiko Matos, Pen Medina
26	"Utol"	Arthur Solinap: Dante; Rochelle Pangilinan: Rose	Michael Christian Cardoz	Michael Christian Cardoz	October 3, 2015
Supporting Cast: Kim Rodriguez, Kiko Estrada
27	"Sumpa"	Solenn Heussaff: Sirena	Adolfo Alix Jr.	Adolfo Alix Jr.	October 10, 2015
Supporting Cast: Joyce Ching, Ruru Madrid, Pekto, Anita Linda
28	"Gayuma"	Karen delos Reyes: Clarisas	Zig Dulay	Jerome Zamora	October 17, 2015
Supporting Cast: Archie Alemania, Mara Lopez
29	"Pamana"	Rafael Rosell: Paolo	Rember Gelera	Danzen Santos	October 24, 2015
Supporting Cast: Wynwyn Marquez
30	"Balo"	Assunta de Rossi: Caring; JC Tiuseco: Lando	Rember Gelera	Danzen Santos	October 31, 2015
Supporting Cast: Glenda Garcia
31	"Webcam"	Rodjun Cruz: Michael; Diva Montelaba: Gina	Adolfo Alix Jr.	Adolfo Alix Jr.	November 7, 2015
Supporting Cast: Sebastian Castro, Ken Anderson, Zymic Jaranilla
32	"Face Value"	Lucho Ayala: RJ	Zig Dulay	Jon Verzosa	November 14, 2015
Supporting Cast: Divine, Arny Ross, Vangie Labalan, Sunshine Teodoro, RJ Agustin
33	"Stepfather"	Emilio Garcia: Jess	Zig Dulay	Zig Dulay	November 21, 2015
Supporting Cast: Mara Lopez, Maria Isabel Lopez
34	"Apartment"	Jackie Lou Blanco: Donna; Martin del Rosario: Alex	Adolfo Alix Jr.	Adolfo Alix Jr.	November 28, 2015
Supporting Cast: Jackie Rice, Jeric Gonzales, Mark McMahon, Angelina Kanapi
35	"Status Symbol"	Diana Zubiri: Trixie	Adolfo Alix Jr.	Gay Ace Domingo	December 5, 2015
Supporting Cast: Ina Feleo, Ken Alfonso, Niña Jose, Marc Justine Alvarez
36	"Blackmail"	Allan Paule: Sir Bong	Paul Sta. Ana	Danzen Santos	December 12, 2015
Supporting Cast: Antonio Aquitania, Angeli Bayani, Lovely Rivero
37	"Piano"	Elizabeth Oropesa: Miranda; Derrick Monasterio: Ato	Adolfo Alix Jr.	Adolfo Alix Jr.	December 19, 2015
Supporting Cast: Sharmaine Arnaiz, Juancho Trivino, Maey Bautista
38	"Daddy Santa"	Sunshine Dizon: Ria	Michael Christian Cardoz	Michael Christian Cardoz	December 26, 2015
Supporting Cast: Alonzo Muhlach, Niño Muhlach

=== 2016 ===
No.	Title	Cast	Directed by	Written by	Original release date
39	"Ex ni BFF"	Kristofer Martin: Jed; Joyce Ching: Apple	Adolfo Alix Jr.	Jon Verzosa	January 2, 2016
Supporting Cast: Ashley Ortega, Neil Ryan Sese, Abel Estanislao
40	"Misyonero"	Diva Montelaba: Baning; Dominic Roco: Jerry	Rember Gelera	Rember Gelera	January 9, 2016
Supporting Cast: Felix Roco, Leo Martinez, Rob Sy
41	"Gold Digger"	Wynwyn Marquez: Sheila; Mark McMahon: Nick	Adolfo Alix Jr.	Adolfo Alix Jr.	January 16, 2016
Supporting Cast: Rich Asuncion, Julian Trono, Jay Arcilla, Jaclyn Jose
42	"Boy Hipon"	JC Tiuseco: Edwin	Zig Dulay	Jerome Zamora	January 23, 2016
Supporting Cast: Arny Ross, Mel Kimura, Flora Gasser, Bryan Benedict
43	"Trip"	Katrina Halili: Zoey	Rember Gelera	Jon Verzosa	January 30, 2016
Supporting Cast: Troy Montero, Jade Lopez, Isabel Granada, Francine Prieto
44	"Madam Z"	Glaiza de Castro: Zandra; Rafael Rosell: Celio	Zig Dulay	Zig Dulay	February 6, 2016
Supporting Cast: Mara Lopez, Divine
45	"Transwoman"	Trixie Maristela: Queen	Michael Christian Cardoz	Michael Christian Cardoz	February 13, 2016
Supporting Cast: James Blanco, Terry Gian, Sue Prado, Dex Quindoza
46	"Rigodon"	Martin del Rosario: Ian	Adolfo Alix Jr.	Mario Banzon	February 20, 2016
Supporting Cast: Roxanne Barcelo, Sebastian Castro, Stephanie Sol, Sandino Martin
47	"Poser"	Ruru Madrid: Marvin; Miggy Jimenez: Arlan	Adolfo Alix Jr.	Adolfo Alix Jr.	February 27, 2016
Supporting Cast: Annika Kamaya, Sanya Lopez, Ken Anderson, Arra San Agustin, Aaron Yanga, Kyle Vergara
48	"Nanay Prosti"	Nova Villa: Doray; Roi Vinzon: Thomas	Michael Christian Cardoz	Michael Christian Cardoz	March 5, 2016
Supporting Cast: Chanda Romero, Lenlen Frial, Arnold Reyes
49	"Old Maid"	Ces Quesada: Zeny; Tommy Abuel: Abel	Zig Dulay	Jerome Zamora	March 12, 2016
Supporting Cast: Yasmien Kurdi, Marco Alcaraz
50	"Wanted: Tatay"	Valerie Concepcion: Eva; Luis Alandy: Emir	Paul Sta. Ana	Jon Verzosa	March 19, 2016
Supporting Cast: Archie Alemania, Glenda Garcia, JC Santos
51	"Inay"	Angel Aquino: Emilia; Benjamin Alves: David	Adolfo Alix Jr.	Jerome Zamora	April 2, 2016
Supporting Cast: Mosang, Anita Linda
52	"Unico Hijo"	Cherry Pie Picache: Lina; Martin del Rosario: Miguel	Adolfo Alix Jr.	Jerome Zamora	April 9, 2016
Supporting Cast: Carl Guevara, Katherine Luna
53	"Fake Wife"	Kris Bernal: Michelle; Fabio Ide: Frank	Michael Christian Cardoz	Jerome Zamora	April 16, 2016
Supporting Cast: Ryza Cenon, Odette Khan
54	"Insecure Wife"	Gardo Versoza: Jun	Rember Gelera	Gay Ace Domingo	April 23, 2016
Supporting Cast: Francine Prieto, Roxanne Barcelo
55	"Live-In"	Carla Abellana: Miriam; Tom Rodriguez: Dennis	Adolfo Alix Jr.	Jerome Zamora	April 30, 2016
Supporting Cast: Stephanie Sol, Mark McMahon, Bryan Benedict, Natalia Alcayaga
56	"Hiya"	Bea Binene: Gail; Derrick Monasterio: EJ	Paul Sta. Ana	Jon Verzosa	May 7, 2016
Supporting Cast: Irma Adlawan, Archie Adamos
57	"Two Mothers"	Ana Capri: Olive; Jay Manalo: Gary	Michael Christian Cardoz	Jerome Zamora	May 14, 2016
Supporting Cast: Precious Lara Quigaman, Sean Ross, Dexter Doria
58	"Pagsubok"	Bobby Andrews: Ben; Angelu de Leon: Rachel	Rember Gelera	Honeylyn Joy Alipio	May 21, 2016
Supporting Cast: Milkah Nacion, Jemwell Ventinilla
59	"Ex"	Jade Lopez: Joan; Carlos Agassi: Nestor	Zig Dulay	Gay Ace Domingo	May 28, 2016
Supporting Cast: Gwen Zamora, Arthur Solinap
60	"Mama Beth"	Gina Alajar: Mama Beth	Adolfo Alix Jr.	Ralston Jover	June 4, 2016
Supporting Cast: Kristofer Martin, Thea Tolentino, Mikoy Morales, Mailes Kanapi
61	"Tatay-Tatayan"	Katrina Halili: Isa; Alex Medina: Elvin	Paul Sta. Ana	Jon Verzosa	June 11, 2016
Supporting Cast: Arnold Reyes, David Remo
62	"Asset"	LJ Reyes: Claire; Ryan Eigenmann: Gerry	Adolfo Alix Jr.	Ralston Jover	June 18, 2016
Supporting Cast: Perla Bautista, Flora Gasser, Jordan Herrera, Yuan Francisco
63	"Sabong"	TJ Trinidad: Allan	Michael Christian Cardoz	Michael Christian Cardoz	June 25, 2016
Supporting Cast: Ara Mina, Aubrey Miles, Victor Medina
64	"Bisita"	Archie Alemania: Harvey; Karen delos Reyes: Katie	Zig Dulay	Honeylyn Joy Alipio	July 2, 2016
Supporting Cast: Sheree Bautista
65	"Kulam"	Denise Barbacena: Elisa; Mike Tan: Daniel	Rember Gelera	Danzen Santos	July 9, 2016
Supporting Cast: Valeen Montenegro, Glenda Garcia, Perla Bautista
66	"Raketera"	Jackie Rice: Christina; Joross Gamboa: Anton	Zig Dulay	Jerome Zamora	July 16, 2016
Supporting Cast: Leandro Baldemor, Mon Confiado, Rolly Inocencio, Maria Isabel Lopez, Vangie Martelle
67	"Reyna"	Kim Rodriguez: Liz; Ken Alfonso: Dennis	Zig Dulay	Jon Verzosa	July 23, 2016
Supporting Cast: Terry Gian, Kiko Matos, Arny Ross
68	"Dahas"	Martin del Rosario: Olan; Joyce Ching: Rosita	Adolfo Alix Jr.	Adolfo Alix Jr.	July 30, 2016
Supporting Cast: Kristofer Martin, Jaclyn Jose
69	"Tenant"	Pen Medina: Greg; Aubrey Miles: Tina	Rember Gelera	Danzen Santos	August 6, 2016
Supporting Cast: Ces Quesada, Tommy Abuel, Dess Verzosa, Alex Medina
70	"Anino"	Max Collins: Alma; Rodjun Cruz: Arman	Zig Dulay	Honeylyn Joy Alipio	August 13, 2016
Supporting Cast: Vangie Labalan, Eunice Lagusad, Kirst Viray, Erlinda Villalobos, Rener Concepcion
71	"Up and Down"	Angel Aquino: Janice; Nonie Buencamino: Filbert	Adolfo Alix Jr.	Ralston Jover	August 20, 2016
Supporting Cast: Jean Garcia
72	"Biktima"	Baron Geisler: John Lloyd; Derrick Monasterio: PJ	Adolfo Alix Jr.	Jon Verzosa	August 27, 2016
Supporting Cast: Elizabeth Oropesa, Maey Bautista, Mikoy Morales, Arvic James Tan, Ben Isaac, Kirst Viray
73	"Ate"	Melissa Mendez: Grace; Glenda Garcia: Ann	Michael Christian Cardoz	Michael Christian Cardoz	September 3, 2016
Supporting Cast: Rita Daniela, JC Tiuseco
74	"Yaya"	Kris Bernal: Sara; Mark McMahon: Daniel	Adolfo Alix Jr.	Adolfo Alix Jr.	September 10, 2016
Supporting Cast: Jay Arcilla, Janna Dominguez, Mark Neumann, Chanda Romero
75	"Kabit-Kabit"	Joross Gamboa: Rannel; Valerie Concepcion: Joni	Paul Sta. Ana	Jon Verzosa	September 17, 2016
Supporting Cast: Dayara Shane, Marco Alcaraz, Ina Feleo
76	"Ambisyosa"	Mel Martinez: Direk; Stephanie Sol: Vanni	Rember Gelera	James Harvey Estrada	September 24, 2016
Supporting Cast: Marc Abaya, Tammy Brown, Jak Roberto
77	"Bonus"	Kim Rodriguez: Jenny; Juancho Trivino: Chris	Michael Christian Cardoz	N/A	October 1, 2016
Supporting Cast: Lucho Ayala, Antonio Aquitania, Ana Capri, Nafa Hilario-Cruz, Kenken Nuyad
78	"Engkanto"	Phillip Salvador: Andrei; Lou Veloso: Berting	Adolfo Alix Jr.	Ralston Jover	October 8, 2016
Supporting Cast: Sharmaine Arnaiz, Elle Ramirez, Prince Clemente, Mikoy Morales
79	"Duwende"	Odette Khan: Sonia; TJ Trinidad: Jack	Rember Gelera	Jon Verzosa	October 15, 2016
Supporting Cast: Sunshine Dizon, Renz Valerio, David Remo
80	"Sapi"	Sanya Lopez: Kristy; Martin del Rosario: Lester	Paul Sta. Ana	Michael Christian Cardoz	October 22, 2016
Supporting Cast: Daria Ramirez, Eunice Lagusad, Raul Morit, Jennifer Catayong, Hannah Precillas, Marika Sasaki
81	"Third Eye"	Rocco Nacino: Jason; Ryza Cenon: Marie	Zig Dulay	Honeylyn Joy Alipio	October 29, 2016
Supporting Cast: Caprice Cayetano, Ben Isaac, Sue Prado, Divine Aucina, Elora Españo, Erlinda Villalobos
82	"Nagmumurang Kamatis"	Cherry Pie Picache: Elena; Rafael Rosell: Xavier	Adolfo Alix Jr.	Jerome Zamora	November 5, 2016
Supporting Cast: Carmi Martin, Mailes Kanapi, Jay Arcilla, Kate Valdez
83	"Naglahong Pangarap"	Mark Herras: Roman; Wynwyn Marquez: Agnes	Michael Christian Cardoz	Jon Verzosa	November 12, 2016
Supporting Cast: Klea Pineda, Maureen Mauricio, Tanya Gomez, Orlando Sol
84	"Desperadang Mabuntis"	Kris Bernal: Rachel; Mike Tan: Raven	Paul Sta. Ana	Honeylyn Joy Alipio	November 19, 2016
Supporting Cast: Ces Quesada, Maui Taylor, J.C. Parker
85	"Dalawang Mukha"	Carlos Morales: Edward; Ken Anderson: Jake	Adolfo Alix Jr.	Adolfo Alix Jr.	November 26, 2016
Supporting Cast: Antonette Garcia, Ina Raymundo
86	"Pag-Ibig na Nakatadhana"	Gabby Concepcion: Romeo; Carla Abellana: Estela	Adolfo Alix Jr.	Jerome Zamora	December 3, 2016
Supporting Cast: Perla Bautista, Mailes Kanapi, Jhoana Marie Tan, Mara Alberto, Prince Clemente
87	"Liberated"	Solenn Heussaff: Chantal; Ahron Villena: Tristan	Adolfo Alix Jr.	Ralston Jover	December 10, 2016
Supporting Cast: Dexter Doria, Carla Humphries, David Licauco, Arvic James Tan, Jody Saliba, Rein Villareal, Ron Lord
88	"Bilin"	Rhian Ramos: Donna; Aljur Abrenica: Joseph	Paul Sta. Ana	Gay Ace Domingo	December 17, 2016
Supporting Cast: Sheena Halili, Pauline Mendoza, Rob Moya, Vince Gamad
89	"Rehas"	Dennis Trillo: Salby; Kim Domingo: Maya	Adolfo Alix Jr.	James Harvey Estrada	December 24, 2016
Supporting Cast: Menggie Cobarrubias, Jeric Gonzales, Marx Topacio
90	"Kasunduan"	Paolo Contis: Ben; Valeen Montenegro: Bela	Zig Dulay	Jon Verzosa	December 31, 2016
Supporting Cast: Jemwell Ventinilla, Nicole Dulalia, Chamyto Aguedan

=== 2017 ===
No.	Title	Cast	Directed by	Written by	Original release date
91	"Puri"	Yasmien Kurdi: Sandra; Ervic Vijandre: Martin	Rember Gelera	N/A	January 7, 2017
Supporting Cast: Roi Vinzon, Lucho Ayala, Aaron Yanga
92	"Bugso"	Albie Casiño: Joel/Lando; Lovi Poe: Alma	Adolfo Alix Jr.	Adolfo Alix Jr.	January 14, 2017
Supporting Cast: Mara Alberto, Gigi Locsin, Anne Garcia, Dex Quindoza
93	"Selos"	Antoinette Taus: Emma; Archie Alemania: Arturo	Michael Christian Cardoz	Honeylyn Joy Alipio	January 21, 2017
Supporting Cast: Mitch Valdez, Nanette Inventor, April Tanhueco, Roanne Sarinas
94	"Apoy"	Jade Lopez: Lush; Rodjun Cruz: Fiero; Aicelle Santos: Cha	Rember Gelera	James Harvey Estrada	January 28, 2017
Supporting Cast: Chamyto Aguedan
95	"Pretenders"	Joyce Ching: Lea; Kristofer Martin: Marco; Jazz Ocampo: Abby	Adolfo Alix Jr.	Adolfo Alix Jr. and Jerome Zamora	February 4, 2017
Supporting Cast: Sam Adjani, Mosang
96	"Valentine's Day"	Sanya Lopez: Erica; Jeric Gonzales: Andy; Ian Batherson: Rico	Zig Dulay	Jon Verzosa	February 11, 2017
Supporting Cast: Nicki B.
97	"Suitor"	Andre Paras: Martin; Arra San Agustin: Kleng; Arvic James Tan: Lee	Paul Sta. Ana	N/A	February 18, 2017
Supporting Cast: Arjay Jimenez, Marika Sasaki, IC Mendoza, Andrew Gan, Divine Aucina
98	"Karibal"	Benjie Paras: Michael; Ruby Rodriguez: Tina	Adolfo Alix Jr.	Adolfo Alix Jr.	February 25, 2017
Supporting Cast: Jerald Napoles, Maey Bautista
99	"Ganti"	Candy Pangilinan: Krissy; Dennis Padilla: Joey; DJ Durano: Alan	Michael Christian Cardoz	Jon Verzosa	March 4, 2017
Supporting Cast: Mel Martinez
100	"My Family"	Bianca Umali: Charming; Miguel Tanfelix: Butchoy	Rember Gelera	James Harvey Estrada	March 11, 2017
Supporting Cast: Nikki Co, Isabel Granada, Jordan Herrera, Boobsie, Ricky Rivero
101	"Maid It"	Matthias Rhoads: Heath; Ella Cruz: Aida	Adolfo Alix Jr.	Jerome Zamora	March 18, 2017
Supporting Cast: Isabella de Leon, Dexter Doria, Flora Gasser, Gene Padilla, John Feir, Kenken Nuyad
102	"Modus"	Joross Gamboa: Erwin; Katrina Halili: Tess	Zig M. Dulay	Troy Espiritu	March 25, 2017
Supporting Cast: Maey Bautista, Chamyto Aguedan, Rob Maya, Buboy Villar
103	"Love is Blind"	Hiro Peralta: Anton; Divine Aucina: Gigi	Paul Sta. Ana	Paul Sta. Ana	April 1, 2017
Supporting Cast: Rita Daniela, Maria Isabel Lopez, Tanya Gomez, Raul Morit, Dess Verzosa
104	"Tukso"	Dina Bonnevie: Ester; Martin del Rosario: Marlon; Gina Alajar: Norma	Adolfo Alix Jr.	Adolfo Alix Jr.	April 8, 2017
Supporting Cast: Elyson de Dios, Faith de Silva, Beatriz Imperial
105	"Biglang Yaman"	Snooky Serna: Andeng; Gardo Versoza: Toyong	Michael Christian Cardoz	Michael Christian Cardoz	April 22, 2017
Supporting Cast: Glenda Garcia, Erlinda Villalobos, Prince Villanueva, Elle Ramirez, Lou Veloso
106	"Perfect Woman"	Bryan Benedict: Enteng; Carlos Agassi: Derick	Rember Gelera	James Harvey Estrada	April 29, 2017
Supporting Cast: Dionne Monsanto, Stephanie Sol, Cai Cortez, Denise Barbacena
107	"Magnanakaw ng Puso"	Albie Casiño: Gilbert; Diana Zubiri: Monet; Lovely Abella: Ana; Patricia Ismael: Babe	Zig Dulay	Troy Espiritu	May 6, 2017
Supporting Cast: Chanda Romero, Balang, Caprice Cayetano, Kevin Almodiente, Marc Justine Alvarez, Dentrix Ponce, Leanne Amber Bautista
108	"Finale"	Meg Imperial: Margaret; Sid Lucero: Raymond; Empress Schuck: Kristel	Paul Sta. Ana	James Harvey Estrada	May 13, 2017
Supporting Cast: Sue Prado, Elora Españo
