= Protégé: The Battle for the Big Artista Break =

- Season's title card
- Created by: GMA Entertainment TV Group; Rommel Gacho; Real Florido
- Written by: Stann Go; Florence Rosini
- Directed by: Albert Langitan (Inside Protege); Rommel C. Gacho (Protege)
- Starring: Hosts: Dingdong Dantes; Jennylyn Mercado; Carla Abellana; Maxene Magalona; Judges: Bert de Leon; Joey de Leon; Cherie Gil; Annette Gozon-Abrogar
- Country of origin: Philippines
- No. of episodes: 77

Production
- Executive producers: Reylie F. Manalo (Inside Protege); Erika D.V. De Leon (Protege)
- Running time: 1 hour (Gala night); 15 minutes (Inside Protege)

Original release
- Network: GMA Network
- Release: July 23 – October 21, 2012

Protégé: The Battle for the Big Artista Break is a 2012 reality TV series created by GMA Network. This show is the second season of Protégé where Krizza Neri won in 2011. Unlike the previous season, the age limit was set from 13 to 21 years old to find new acting talent. The show premiered on July 23, 2012 (Inside Protégé) and hosted by Jennylyn Mercado and under the direction of Albert Langitan, while the Protégé Gala Night premiered on August 5, 2012, and presented by Dingdong Dantes, together with Carla Abellana and Maxene Magalona. The gala nights were directed by Rommel Gacho.

== Overview ==
Hosts

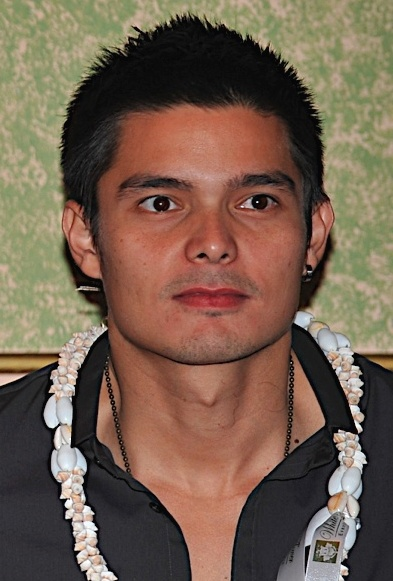
Dingdong Dantes

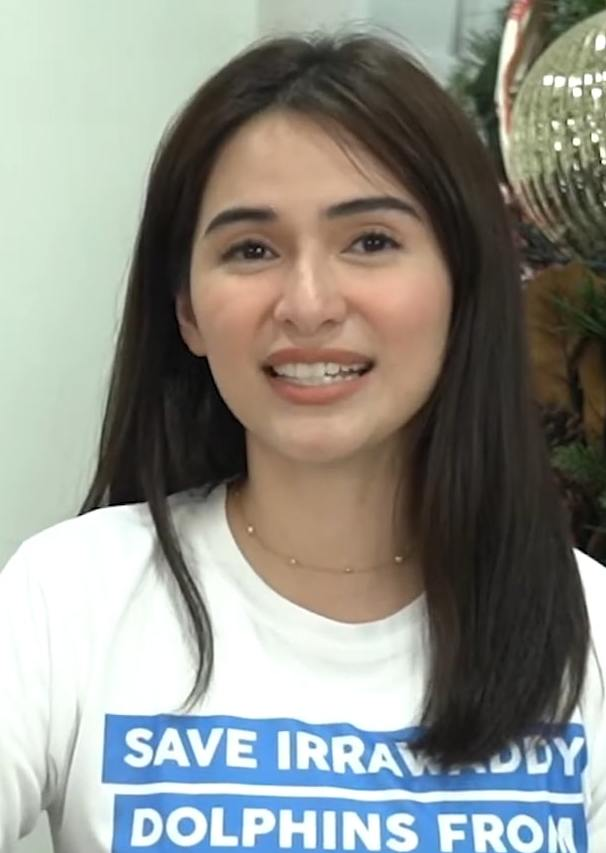
Jennylyn Mercado

According to the show's fan page, there will be a "new kind of battle". Rumor has it that the incoming season will feature the other talent like acting or dancing and eventually will be an artista search like StarStruck did and it turned out to be true.

The show followed the same format as the previous season, except that it was no longer a singing competition but a talent artista search. Aspirants from ages 13 to 21 were filtered until two winners emerge - one male and one female protégé. In this battle, they were looking for a total package - an artist who can sing, dance, act and possess that charismatic appeal over TV. Like the first Protégé competition, this season had judges/mentors who were responsible for training and mentoring the chosen candidates.

Twenty contestants were then selected from thousands of hopefuls. These 20 potential artists lived in the Protégé house complete with amenities including bedrooms for each contestant, a living room, dining area with a 20 seating capacity, a rehearsal area where they could practice dancing, singing and acting, and a confession room where they were asked to explain themselves in case of issues within the house or if a task was to be assigned privately. They also battled it out head to head for audience votes. The Protégé house was blessed and featured over the news of GMA Network long before the contestants resided there.

The winner received a 5-year contract with GMA Network.

== Judges, mentors and coaches ==
=== Judges ===
- Joey de Leon
- Bert de Leon
- Annette Gozon-Valdez
- Cherie Gil

=== Mentors ===
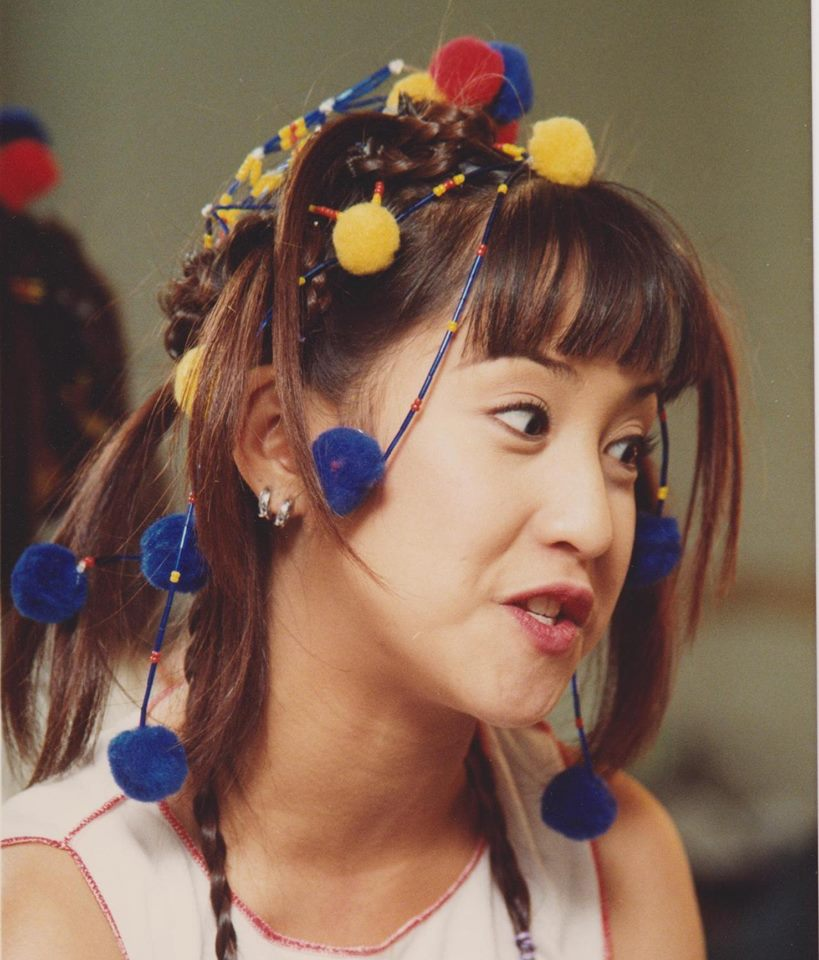
Jolina Magdangal served as a mentor.

There were five confirmed mentors for this season with their assigned location.

- Ricky Davao—Northern and Central Luzon
- Roderick Paulate—Mega Manila
- Gina Alajar—Southern Luzon
- Jolina Magdangal—Visayas
- Phillip Salvador—Mindanao

=== Coaches ===
Aside from their respective mentors who served as their guardian all the way through their journey, the protégés had coaches who also helped them improve their chosen craft.

- Voice — Sushi Reyes
- Dancing — Joe Abuda
- Personality development — Floy Quintos
- Acting — Maryo J. de los Reyes and Yanni Yuzon with Pen Medina
- Fitness — Al Galang
- Showbiz values & formation — German Moreno

== Auditions ==
Cities where the auditions are being held.

Auditions took place in the following cities:

Casting Dates	Venues	City
May 19, 2012	SM City Rosales	Rosales
May 19, 2012	SM City Marikina	Marikina
May 26, 2012	SM City Naga	Naga
May 26, 2012	SM City Baguio	Baguio
May 26, 2012	SM City San Pablo	San Pablo
June 1, 2012	SM City Bacolod	Bacolod
June 1, 2012	SM City Cagayan de Oro	Cagayan de Oro
June 2, 2012	SM City Iloilo	Iloilo
June 2, 2012	SM City Davao	Davao
June 7, 2012	SM City Cebu	Cebu
June 9, 2012	Capitol Grounds	Laoag
June 10, 2012^{1}	SM City Sucat	Parañaque
June 14, 2012	SM City Batangas	Batangas
June 16, 2012	SM City Pampanga	San Fernando
June 18–20, 2012^{2}	SM Mall of Asia	Pasay

- ^Note 1 The original schedule of auditions in SM Sucat is May 20, 2012
- ^Note 2 The original schedule of auditions in SM Mall of Asia is June 20–21, 2012

After the city auditions, Protégé also gave the hopefuls an alternative way to audition via online.

== Semifinalists ==
After a series of auditions, a mentor chose eight hopefuls from the shortlist and those who passed from the online auditions. These eight aspiring protégés, which were composed of four boys and four girls, were called to come back for the final deliberation to determine the official four protégés. The other four protégés who were not chosen were eliminated.

The twenty semifinalists who failed to advance in the finals are as follows:

Mentor	Location	Male protégés	Hometown	Female protégés	Hometown
Gina Alajar	Southern Luzon	Allan Arnold Palma		Ivana Jane Villanueva	
Gina Alajar	Southern Luzon	Evan James Evia		Shara Jane Chavez	
Jolina Magdangal	Visayas	Jhaymes Clark Caracuel	Cebu	Cris An Chavez	Bacolod City
Jolina Magdangal	Visayas	Kier Stephen Durano	Danao	Kerchedel Allyssa Concepcion	Bacolod City
Phillip Salvador	Mindanao	Archimedes Udaundo	Davao City	Pauline Go	
Phillip Salvador	Mindanao	Tomas Monteverde		Trixia Pearl Ebita	
Ricky Davao	Northern & Central Luzon	Isaac Jacob De Leon		Dale David	
Ricky Davao	Northern & Central Luzon	John Cristopher Danan		Kathryn David	
Roderick Paulate	Mega Manila	Jason Salvador		Nicole Kim Donesa	
Roderick Paulate	Mega Manila	Jimmy Noccon		Xzania Ketz	

== Finalists ==
Originally, there were four protégés per mentor for this season, totaling twenty protéges. However, during the first week of Top 10, each mentor chose one of his or her remaining protegés to stay under his or her guidance. The protégés who were not chosen were later picked by other mentors, making a new protégé-mentor tandem.

The twenty finalists were confirmed as follows:

Key:

– Winner
– Runner-up

Mentor	Protégé	Age	Hometown	Note
Gina Alajar	Mykel Ong	20	Batangas	
Gina Alajar	Thea Tolentino	15	Calamba	
Gina Alajar	Zandra Summer	18	Cebu	Originally Jolina Magdangal's protégé
Jolina Magdangal
Jolina Magdangal	Jeric Gonzales	19	Calamba	Originally Gina Alajar's protégé
Jolina Magdangal	Mikoy Morales	18	Roxas City	
Jolina Magdangal	Mitch Capili	15	Bohol	
Phillip Salvador	Apple Vega	20	Dipolog	
Phillip Salvador	Arny Ross	21	Dasmariñas	Originally Gina Alajar's protégé
Phillip Salvador	David John Llanas	19	Cagayan de Oro	
Phillip Salvador	Ruru Madrid	14	Zamboanga	
Phillip Salvador	Steffi Pacheco	16	Davao	
Ricky Davao	Bryan Benedict	21	Cebu	Originally Jolina Magdangal's protégé
Ricky Davao	Glenn Roy	18	Tarlac	
Ricky Davao	Reese Tayag	16	Tarlac	
Ricky Davao	Shelly Hipolito	16	Nueva Ecija	
Roderick Paulate	Andres Vasquez	21	Taguig	
Roderick Paulate	Japs De Luna	20	Nueva Ecija	Originally Ricky Davao's protégé
Roderick Paulate	Elle Ramirez	18	Rizal	
Roderick Paulate	Kelly D.	15	Pasig	
Roderick Paulate	Vien Alen King	19	Quezon Province	

== Weekly episodes ==
No.	Title	Original release date
1	"#ProtegeTop20"	August 5, 2012
The final twenty protégés were revealed.
2	"#ProtegeBattleNight"	August 12, 2012
The finalists were tasked to do a musical. The said performances were the bases of the judges' verdict to determine who would be in the bottom two per region. The bottom ten (2 per region) have to defend their slot in the next gala night in order to stay in the competition. The losing protégé will be sent home.
3	"#ProtegeShowdown"	August 19, 2012
The bottom ten performed individually. The judges voiced out their opinions about who stood out more but the decision was from the mentors of whom they would save.
4	"#ProtegeMaryaSerye"	August 26, 2012
The top 15 protégés were featured in five short films with special guest celebrity, Diamond Star Ms. Maricel Soriano. Under the helm of Prix de la mise en scène awardee at the 2009 Cannes Film Festival, Brillante Mendoza and written by Palanca awardee Floy Quintos. Special awards were given to outstanding protégés: Maricel Soriano's choice for Best Female Performance—Elle Ramirez; Maricel Soriano's choice for Best Male Performance—Andres Vasquez; Judges' Choice for Best Ensemble Performance—Team Visayas; Direk Brillante Mendoza's choice for Breakthrough Protégé Performance—Andres Vasquez; These awards guaranteed them an automatic save from elimination.
5	"#ProtegeShock"	September 2, 2012
Each protégé was paired to a protégé from another mentor; each pair performed a duo in front of the judges.: Arny Ross and Zandra Summer performed a dance number together with the song Burlesque by Christina Aguilera.; Jeric Gonzales and David John Llanas sang This Love by the Maroon 5.; Japs De Luna and Elle Ramirez did a sensual dance performance of the song Careless Whisper by Kenny G and Bryan McKnight.; Mikoy Morales and Thea Tolentino showcased their singing and dancing skills with the tune Teenage Dream by Katy Perry.; Bryan Benedict and Andres Vasquez did a dance number of It's Raining Men by The Weather Girls.; Shelly Hipolito and Ruru Madrid danced the song I Won't Dance by Frank Sinatra.; Vien Alen King and Steffi Pacheco did a duet of Lucky by Jason Mraz and Colbie Caillat.; The show revealed the first 2 "shocks": First, there will be four protégés who will be eliminated during the night, and second was that the mentors have to choose one of their protégés to stay under their guidance. Because of the unexpected twists, the mentors were not able to decide on who they will choose.
6	"#ProtegeAfterShock"	September 9, 2012
The mentors finally chose their protégés who will stay under their guidance. Mentor Gina Alajar chose Thea Tolentino while mentor Ricky Davao chose Shelly Hipolito and mentor Jolina Magdangal chose Mikoy Morales. On the other hand, mentors Phillip Salvador and Roderick Paulate have only one protégé left each. As the gala night ends, the mentor chose another protégé from the other mentor's former protégés, signalling that that was the third "shock". The judges' role was to give their opinion to the mentors of who should be with whom.
7	"#ProtegeMentorBattle"	September 16, 2012
The protégés, together with their mentors, performed on stage.
8	"#ProtegeKapusoMatch"	September 23, 2012
The protégés showed their hosting skills to their guests, Ms. Lolit Solis and Bea Binene. Ms. Lolit Solis and Bea must portray a rude guest to test the protégés' ability in hosting especially with those kind of interviewees. On the gala night, the protégés performed on stage partnered by a Kapuso star. Elle Ramirez was paired to Mark Herras, Japs De Luna with Wynwyn Marquez, Shelly Hipolito to Rocco Nacino, Bryan Benedict to Kris Bernal, Zandra Summer to Aljur Abrenica, Thea Tolentino to Alden Richards, Mikoy Morales to Julie Anne San Jose, Jeric Gonzales with Louise delos Reyes and Ruru Madrid was partnered to Barbie Forteza.
9	"#ProtegeSwitch"	September 30, 2012
A mentor has to give a task to the other mentor's protégé. The protégés are generally showed their singing skills.
10	"#ProtegeNation"	October 7, 2012
The performances of the protégés were based from the requests of their respective fans. The mentors from season 1 (Aiza Seguerra, Claire de la Fuente, Imelda Papin, Jaya, Jay-R and Joey Generoso with Verni Varga) performed with the protégés on the gala night.
11	"#ProtegeFinalBattle"	October 14, 2012
This week was the first part of The Final Battle. The challenges that were given to the protégés were to be from the judges. Judge Annette Abrogar gave a challenge to Jeric Gonzales and Zandra Summer; judge Cherie Gil assigned the tasks to Thea Tolentino and Mikoy Morales; judge Bert de Leon to Ruru Madrid and judge Joey de Leon to Elle Ramirez.
12	"#ProtegeFinalResults"	October 21, 2012
The final challenge was an acting challenge for the remaining six finalists. Jeric Gonzales portrayed Errol Ochoa in Coffee Prince, which is portrayed by Benjamin Alves. Zandra Summer, on the other hand, portrayed the lead role as Magdalena Fuentebella-Soriano in Magdalena, which is originally portrayed by Bela Padilla. Mikoy Morales played Mikael Daez's character in Sana ay Ikaw na Nga as Carlos Miguel Altamonte; while Elle Ramirez played Lualhati Salvador in Aso ni San Roque, which is originally portrayed by LJ Reyes. Ruru Madrid played the character of Derrick Monasterio as Iñigo Villamor in Paroa: Ang Kuwento ni Mariposa with Barbie Forteza. Thea Tolentino shared the scene with Heart Evangelista as the latter's younger sister, Luna Sandoval in Luna Blanca, which is originally portrayed by Bianca King.

== Elimination chart ==
Color key:

Male contestant
Female contestant
Top 20
Did not perform
Challenge Winner
Safe
Safe first
Safe last
Eliminated
Finalist
Runner-up
Winner

Mentor Key:

– Gina Alajar
– Ricky Davao
– Jolina Magdangal
– Roderick Paulate
– Phillip Salvador

Results per public and council votes
Date: (2012)			8/12^{1}	8/19^{2}	8/26^{3}	9/2	9/9^{4}	9/16	9/23	9/30	10/7	10/14^{5}	10/21
Place	Protégé	Mentor	Result										
1-2	Jeric Gonzales		Safe	Did not perform	Safe	Safe	Safe	Safe	Safe	Safe	Safe	Safe	Protégé Male Battle Champ
1-2	Thea Tolentino		Safe	Did not perform	Safe	Safe	Did not perform	Safe	Safe	Safe	Safe	Safe	Protégé Female Battle Champ
3-6	Ruru Madrid		Bottom 2	Safe	Safe	Safe	Did not perform	Bottom 5	Safe	Bottom 2	Safe	Safe	Runner-up
3-6	Mikoy Morales		Safe	Did not perform	Challenge Winner	Safe	Did not perform	Safe	Safe	Safe	Safe	Safe	Runner-up
3-6	Elle Ramirez		Safe	Did not perform	Challenge Winner	Safe	Did not perform	Safe	Safe	Safe	Safe	Safe	Runner-up
3-6	Zandra Summer		Bottom 2	Safe	Challenge Winner	Safe	Safe	Safe	Safe	Safe	Safe	Safe	Runner-up
7	Japs De Luna		Bottom 2	Safe	Bottom 3	Safe	Safe	Bottom 5	Bottom 3	Safe	Eliminated		Finalist
8	Bryan Benedict		Safe	Did not perform	Challenge Winner	Safe	Safe	Bottom 5	Bottom 3	Eliminated			Finalist
9	Shelly Hipolito		Safe	Did not perform	Safe	Bottom 5	Did not perform	Bottom 5	Eliminated				Finalist
10	Arny Ross		Bottom 2	Safe	Safe	Safe	Safe	Eliminated					Finalist
11-14	Vien Alen King		Bottom 2	Safe	Bottom 3	Eliminated							Finalist
11-14	David John Llanas		Safe	Did not perform	Safe	Eliminated							Finalist
11-14	Steffi Pacheco		Safe	Did not perform	Safe	Eliminated							Finalist
11-14	Andres Vasquez		Safe	Did not perform	Challenge Winner	Eliminated							Finalist
15	Reese Tayag		Safe	Did not perform	Eliminated								Finalist
16-20	Mitch Capili		Bottom 2	Eliminated									Finalist
16-20	Kelly D.		Bottom 2	Eliminated									Finalist
16-20	Mykel Ong		Bottom 2	Eliminated									Finalist
16-20	Glenn Roy		Bottom 2	Eliminated									Finalist
16-20	Apple Vega		Bottom 2	Eliminated									Finalist

^Note 1 There was no elimination held but the Bottom 2 from each region were chosen.
^Note 2 The bottom two protégés (from each region) competed between each other to defend their slot.
^Note 3 The challenge winners were the protégés who received special awards and were granted an immunity from elimination for that week.
^Note 4 As part of the shock, the mentors had to choose a new protege from the other "mentor less proteges" who performed that night. The gala night was a non-elimination night.
^Note 5 That gala night was already the first part of The Final Battle.

== Awards and nominations ==
- 10th Golden Screen TV Awards 2013
  - Outstanding Original Reality Competition Program Host Winner- Dingdong Dantes
- 27th PMPC Star Awards for Television 2013
  - Best Reality Competition Program - Pending
  - Best Reality Competition Program Hosts - Pending Nominees: Dingdong Dantes, Jennylyn Mercado, Carla Abellana, Maxene Magalona

== See also ==
- StarStruck (Philippine TV series)
- Are You the Next Big Star?
- Pinoy Idol
- Pinoy Pop Superstar
- List of programs broadcast by GMA Network
