= Protégé (TV series) =

Philippine television reality show

- Title card in 2012
- Genre: Talent show
- Created by: Rommel Gacho; Real Florido
- Directed by: Rommel Gacho; Albert Langitan
- Presented by: Dingdong Dantes; Jennylyn Mercado; Carla Abellana; Maxene Magalona; Ogie Alcasid
- Judges: Joey de Leon; Bert de Leon; Annette Gozon-Abrogar; Cherie Gil; Louie Ocampo; Eula Valdez
- Country of origin: Philippines
- Original language: Tagalog
- No. of seasons: 2
- No. of episodes: 183

Production
- Executive producers: Erika D.V. De Leon; Wilma Galvante
- Production locations: Finals: CenterStage, SM Mall of Asia (2011); GMA Network Studio 7 (2012)
- Camera setup: Multiple-camera setup
- Running time: 15–60 minutes
- Production company: GMA Entertainment TV

Original release
- Network: GMA Network
- Release: September 4, 2011 – October 21, 2012

Protégé is a Philippine television talent show broadcast by GMA Network. It premiered on September 4, 2011, on the network's Telebabad line up. The show concluded on October 21, 2012, with a total of two seasons and 183 episodes.

== Overview ==
The program seeks to discover new celebrities in the country through a series of nationwide auditions. The public votes for the outcomes of the later stages through text voting and half of the results are from the judges. The judges give critiques not only of the contestants performances depending but also to their respective mentors on the challenges that are being given to them.

The result reveals right after the performance. The first two results nights during season 1 were shown one hour after the performance of the finalists. The judges, on the other hand, are happy that their opinions matter in this contest, since the results do not depend solely on text votes.

== Judges ==
Judges

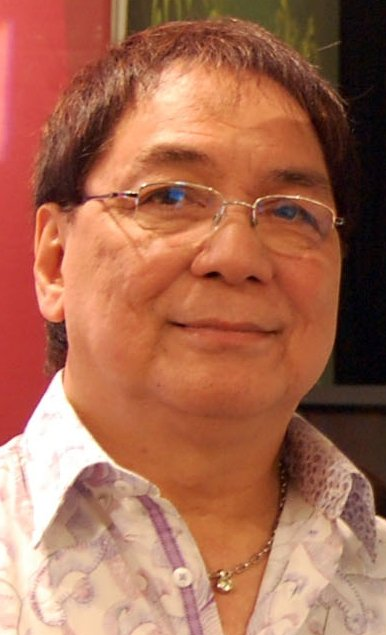
Joey de Leon

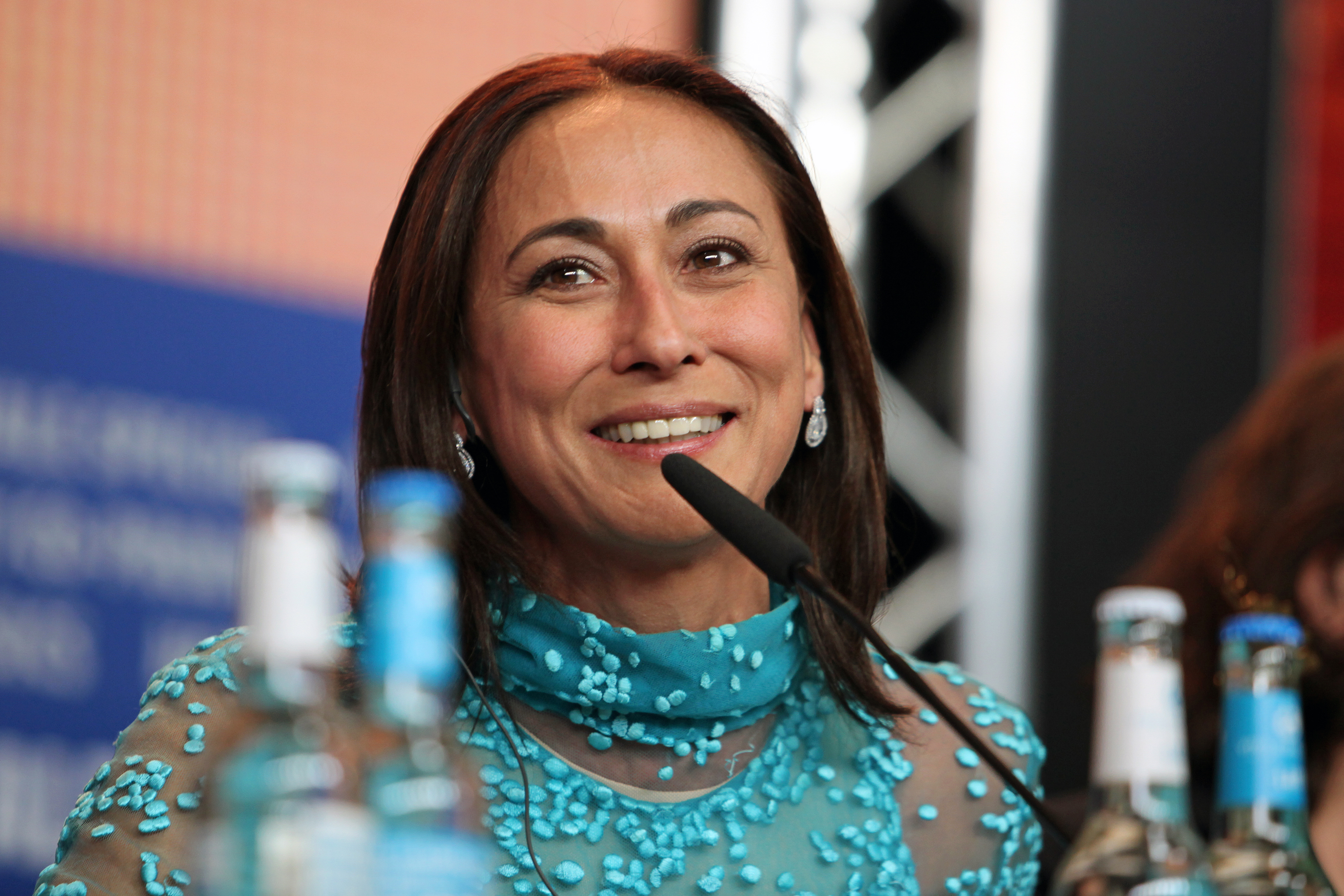
Cherie Gil

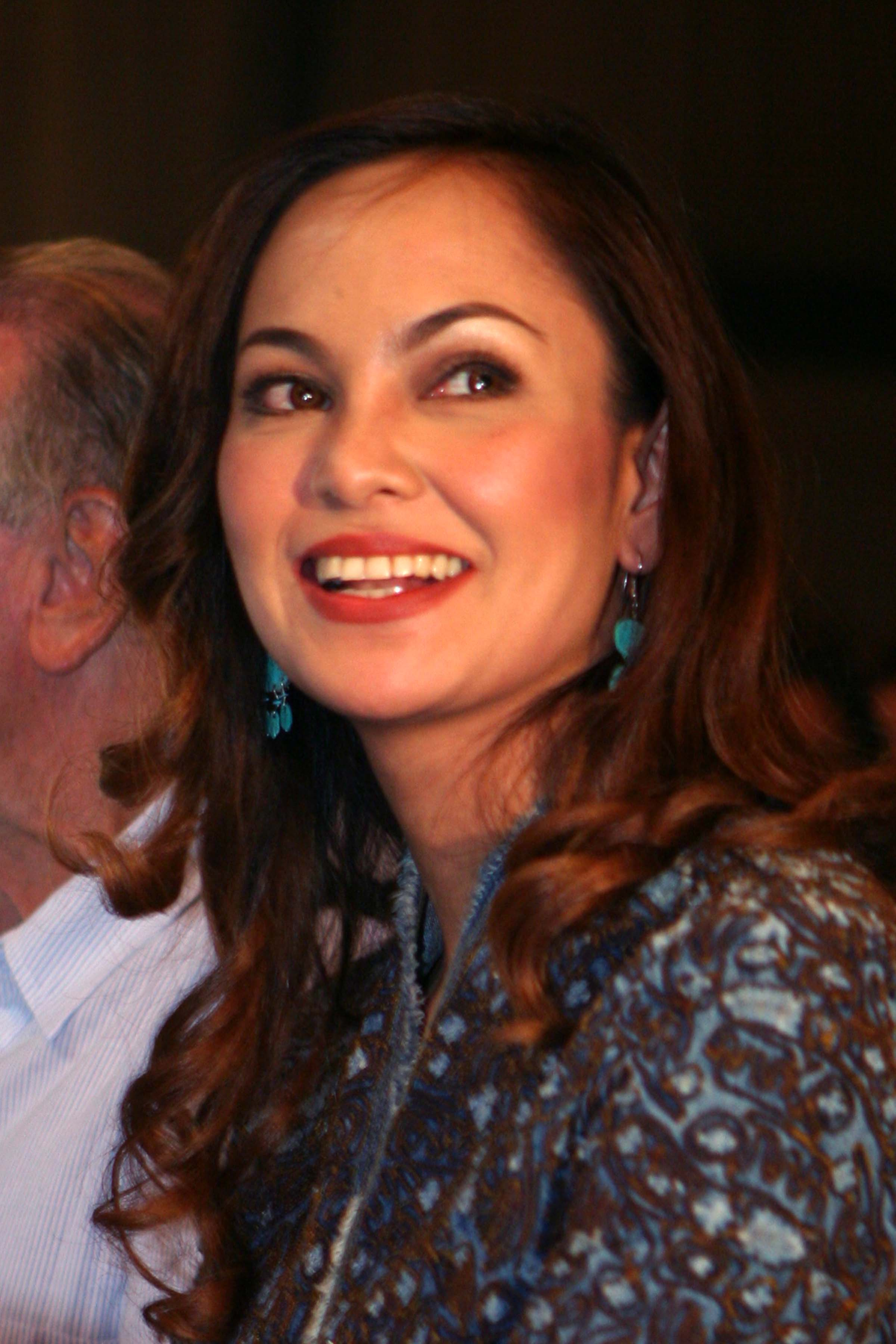
Eula Valdez

Joey de Leon and Bert de Leon started to become a judge since the Face Off round of season one. Homer Flores was also a judge in the Face Off round during season one with the de Leons. Louie Ocampo started his judging stint since the first gala night of season one replacing Flores as Ocampo was the original judge. Eula Valdez, on the other hand, started as a guest judge during fourth gala night and eventually, became a regular judge as she attended all the following remaining gala nights. During season 2, Joey and Bert de Leon came back as judges; together with them is the GMA Films president, Annette Gozon-Abrogar and the season one guest judge, Cherie Gil.

== Hosts ==
Hosts

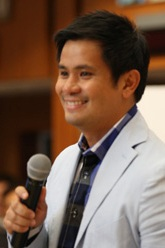
Ogie Alcasid

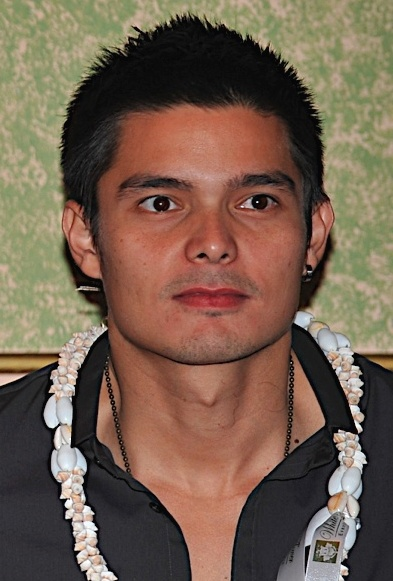
Dingdong Dantes

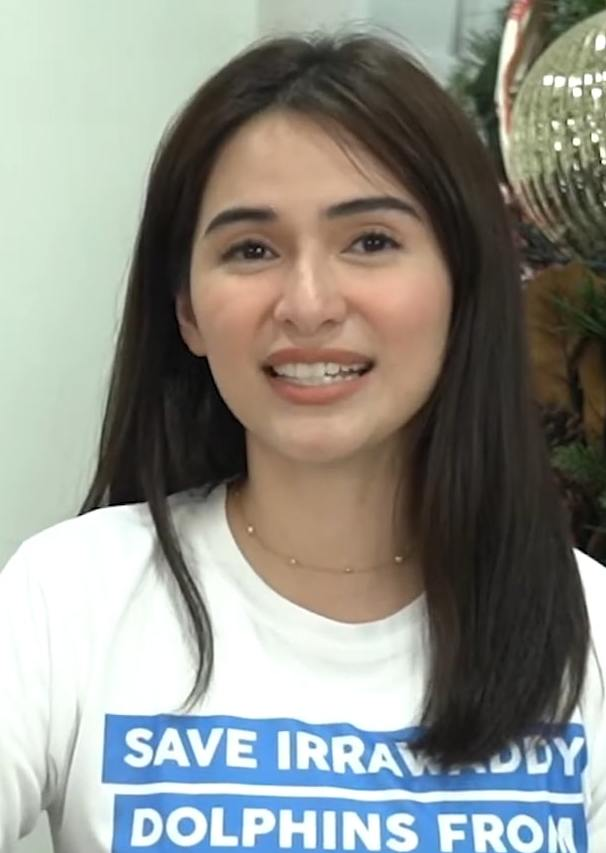
Jennylyn Mercado

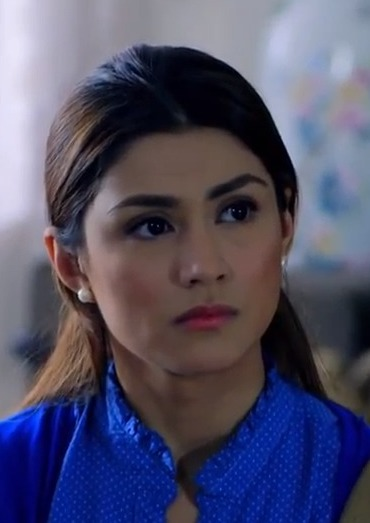
Carla Abellana

The hosts of the first season were Ogie Alcasid as the "Journey Host", Dingdong Dantes as the "Gala Presenter" and Jennylyn Mercado as the "Reality Host". For the second season, Carla Abellana replaced Alcasid and Maxene Magalona is the additional host for the show's webisode.

== Selection process ==
In a series of steps, the show selects the eventual winner out of many tens of thousands of contestants.

=== Contestant eligibility ===
The eligible age-range for contestants is currently thirteen to twenty-one years old. In season one, there was no age limit. Since season one was a singing competition, groups could audition with a maximum number of five members.

=== Auditions ===
The mentors were tasked to roam around the country and scour different provinces and cities to find their bets for the competition. This is the first level of the competition wherein the mentors will invade their assigned audition sites.

The mentors will be the guide of the protégés. They will groom and help the contestants to stay in the competition. A mentor's role is make his or her protégé shine. They will be aided by two Audition Masters in searching for their protégés. These two audition masters are renowned starmaker Jojie Dingcong and GMA Artist Center Head Arsi Baltazar.

In the first season, aspiring proteges will come from two sources. First is the pre-screening done by the Audition Masters before the Regionals Proper. Second are the aspirants personally invited by the mentors based on the research that the staff conducted. When faced with the mentors, the aspiring Proteges will hear "Yes" if they are to be considered for the next round or "No" if they are not. Those who got a Yes will be pooled and the mentors will choose only three each that they will take with them to Manila.

In season 2, the audition mechanics were basically the same except the audition sites rose from 10 key cities to 15. After the city auditions, Protégé also gave the hopefuls an alternative way to audition via online.

=== Face Off Round ===
Since the show shifted from a singing competition to an artista search, the selection process from Face Off Round to the finals made some major changes.

In season 1, after the provincial auditions, the mentors are left with three protégés each, completing the Top 30 protégés. This is considered to be the Semi - Final Round. Top 30 protégés competed with each other where individual acts performs in front of the three judges. The judges then tell the mentors which of the three should be their protégé that they will pit against the other mentors' protégés. In the end of the Face Off round, every mentor will only have one protégé each. There will only be ten protégés competing in the next round.

In season 2, there were eight shortlisted contestants per mentor with an overall total of 40 contestants. These 40 aspiring protégés once again faced their mentors for a further judgement. After that part, the mentors decided who will be their final 4 protégés — 2 boys and 2 girls. After their decision, the 40 aspirants were reduced to 20 protégés and these 20 were revealed during the show's first gala night signalling that they are their mentors' official protégés.

=== Finals ===
The protégés from season 1 represented their audition city while in season 2, the four protégés represented their region.

Season 1 was broadcast in prime time from CenterStage, SM Mall of Asia, Pasay, in front of a live studio audience. The finals in season one lasted ten weeks. The ranking of votes was being revealed every after one finalist was done performing. However, the final ranking would not be revealed but the bottom group. During the first weeks, there was a bottom four but eventually it was reduced to bottom three and bottom two finalists. This method had been repeatedly done until three protégés remain. The finale of season one occurred at CenterStage in SM Mall of Asia.

In season 2, the gala nights were held at Studio 7 of GMA Network Center. The top twenty protégés were reduced to top fifteen during the second gala night. The mentors eliminated one protégé each from them totaling to five protégés. It was based from the performances of their bottom two which is from the decision of the judges during the protégés' performances from the previous week. The text votes was introduced in the fourth gala night. The finale of season two was held at the GMA Network Studio 7.

=== Rewards for winner and finalists ===
In season 1, the winner, Krizza Neri received ₱ 1,000,000.00. Other than the cash prize, a 2-bedroom condo unit worth ₱ 3,000,000 and a five-year management contract with GMA Artist Center were also given. The winner, together with the runners-up, received a four-year scholarship grant from STI College. Lovely Embuscado received the "Texters’ Choice Award" and the "Skyflakes Biggest Break Award" with a total cash prize of 150 thousand Philippines pesos.

The prizes given for the winners of the second season are two 2-bedroom condo units, 1 million Philippine pesos cash prize for each winners and management contract with GMA Artist Center. All six remaining finalists received a 4-year scholarship from STI College like in season one. Jeric Gonzales received the "Texters' Choice Award" with a cash prize of 20 thousand pesos. The winning mentors' prize was 500 thousand pesos each.

== Seasons ==
=== Grand finalists ===
Season	Winner	Mentor	Runner up	Mentor
Protégé: The Battle for the Big Break	Krizza Neri	Aiza Seguerra	Lirah Bermudez Lovely Embuscado	Janno Gibbs Jaya
Protégé: The Battle for the Big Artista Break	Jeric Gonzales Thea Tolentino	Jolina Magdangal^{1} Gina Alajar	Elle Ramirez Mikoy Morales Ruru Madrid Zandra Summer	Roderick Paulate Jolina Magdangal Phillip Salvador Gina Alajar^{1}

- ^Note 1 Gina Alajar is the original mentor of Jeric Gonzales. Zandra Summer's original mentor is Jolina Magdangal.

=== Season 1 ===
Protégé: The Battle for the Big Break was first announced on the GMA Network Sunday entertainment program Party Pilipinas, where the hosts invited everyone to audition for the upcoming show. Much of the auditions were held at SM Supermalls throughout the Philippines.

The first season was directed by Rommel Gacho, and was hosted by Dingdong Dantes, Ogie Alcasid and Jennylyn Mercado. The judges, who scrutinized the protégés and their respective mentor throughout the competition are composed of Joey De Leon, Bert de Leon, Louie Ocampo and Eula Valdez. The mentors who groomed their protégés at their best were Aiza Seguerra, Claire de la Fuente, Gloc-9, Imelda Papin, Janno Gibbs, Jaya, Jay-R, Joey Generoso, Rachelle Ann Go and Rey Valera.

The pilot episode aired on September 4, 2011. Out of thousands who auditioned for a stab at stardom, the initial cut was reduced to 30 and from 30 to only 10 protégés as finalists. The Ten underwent various workshops and trainings in order to hone their talents.

=== Season 2 ===
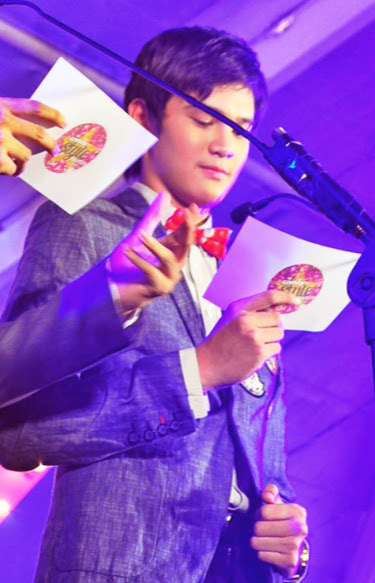
Ruru Madrid serves as a contestant.

Protégé: The Battle for the Big Artista Break was first announced on the GMA Network Sunday entertainment program Party Pilipinas, where the hosts invited everyone to audition for the upcoming show. The network's winners from their reality shows did a production number to promote the show.

Since the show shifted from singing competition to an overall competition, the mentors were also changed from household local musicians to the veteran actors and actresses composed of Roderick Paulate, Gina Alajar, Ricky Davao, Phillip Salvador and Jolina Magdangal. Joey De Leon and Bert de Leon continued their roles as judges with Annette Gozon-Abrogar and Cherie Gil as the new members of the panel. Carla Abellana replaced Ogie Alcasid as the journey host while Maxene Magalona joined the cast as the webjock.

The pilot episode of Inside Protégé aired on July 23, 2012, and the first gala night was held on August 5, 2012.

During the 5th gala night (Protégé Shock!), there were twists that were revealed: First, there was a multiple elimination leaving the 10 remaining protégés in the competition. Right after the results, the second twist was announced that the mentors have to keep only one protégé to stay under their guidance. Because of the multiple elimination, the mentors were not able to decide right away and instead, they told everyone that they will do the task the next week resulting to the suspension of the third twist. The third twist was the mentors had to choose from the other "mentor less protégés" except to their original protégé.

== Ratings ==
According to AGB Nielsen Philippines' Mega Manila household television ratings, the pilot episode of Protégé earned a 7.6 rating. The season one finale scored a 12.1% rating.

The premiere of the second season achieved a 20.7% rating. The season two finale achieved a 16.9% rating.

== Accolades ==
Accolades received by Protégé
Year	Award	Category	Recipient	Result	Ref.
2011	KZone Magazine Awards	Favorite Reality Show of the Year	Protégé	Won	
2012	26th PMPC Star Awards for Television	Best Talent Search Program	Protégé	Nominated	
2012	26th PMPC Star Awards for Television	Best Talent Search Program Host	Dingdong Dantes Ogie Alcasid Jennylyn Mercado	Nominated	
2013	27th PMPC Star Awards for Television	Best Reality Competition Program	Protégé	Nominated	
2013	27th PMPC Star Awards for Television	Best Reality Competition Program Host	Dingdong Dantes Jennylyn Mercado Carla Abellana Maxene Magalona	Nominated	
2013	Golden Screen TV Awards	Outstanding Original Reality/Competition Program	Protégé	Nominated	
2013	Golden Screen TV Awards	Outstanding Original Reality/Competition Program	Inside Protégé	Nominated	
2013	Golden Screen TV Awards	Outstanding Original Reality Competition Program Host	Dingdong Dantes Jennylyn Mercado	Won	
2013	Golden Screen TV Awards	Outstanding Original Reality Competition Program Host	Dingdong Dantes Jennylyn Mercado	Nominated	
