= Zandra Summer =

Filipina-Austrian actress

- Other name: Zandra
- Occupation: Actress
- Years active: 2011–present
- Agents: GMA Artist Center (2012–2016) Viva Artists Agency (2016–present) ABS-CBN (2018–present); TV5 Network (2021–present)

Zandra Summer is a Filipina-Austrian actress who gained media attention through Protégé: The Battle for the Big Artista Break.

== Career ==
Summer auditioned for Protégé: The Battle for the Big Artista Break, where she became the protégé of singer and actress Jolina Magdangal, but, due to the show's twist of event, her mentor Jolina Magdangal had to let her go, and award-winning actress Gina Alajar became her new mentor, and by 21 October 2012, she became one of the runners-up of Protégé: The Battle For The Big Artista Break along with Elle Ramirez, Mikoy Morales, and Ruru Madrid, while Thea Tolentino and Jeric Gonzales was pronounced the ultimate winner of Protégé: The Battle for the Big Artista Break Season 2.

In 2013, Summer was the cast in the fantasy drama of GMA Network called Pyra: Ang Babaeng Apoy together with Thea Tolentino, Jeric Gonzales, Elle Ramirez and veteran actresses Angelu de Leon and Gladys Reyes.

In 2016, she is now a freelance artist signed to VIVA Artists Agency. She is now semi-exclusive in showbiz but is seen in ABS-CBN where she plays minor and recurring roles in many of the teleseryes produced.

== Filmography ==
=== Television ===
Year	Title	Role	Notes
2012	Protégé: The Battle for the Big Artista Break	Herself / Contestant	Runner-up
2012	Party Pilipinas	Herself / Performer	Guest (2012–2013)
2013	Bukod Kang Pinagpala	Amy	Supporting Cast
2013	Pyra: Babaeng Apoy	Ena	Main Cast
2014	Paraiso Ko'y Ikaw	Elizabeth Castillo	Special Participation
2014	Rhodora X	Young Lourdes	Guest Cast
2014	Dading	Josie	Supporting Cast
2015	Once Upon a Kiss	Secretary of Giselle Pelaez	Special Participation
2016	A1 Ko Sa 'Yo	Kate	Episode Guest
2018	Bagani	Magindara	Recurring Role
2019	Ipaglaban Mo: Gayuma	Candy	Episode Guest
2019	Ipaglaban Mo: Palaban	Issa	Episode Guest
2019	Nang Ngumiti ang Langit	David's assistant	Guest role
2019	Kadenang Ginto	Michi	Guest role
2021	Paano ang Pangako?	Samantha	Recurring Role

=== Film ===
Year	Title	Role
2011	Tween Academy: Class of 2012	Julia
2014	Basement	Alyssa
