= Elle Ramirez =

Filipina actress, singer, dancer and model

- Born: Elle Ramirez; Rodriguez, Rizal, Philippines
- Occupations: Actress, Model, Dancer
- Years active: 2012–present

Elle Ramirez (born in Rodriguez, Rizal, Philippines) is a Filipina actress, model, and dancer. She started her acting career when she joined Protégé: The Battle For The Big Artista Break.

== Career ==
Ramirez auditioned for the Season 2 of GMA's reality-based talent show Protégé, where she became the protégé of singer and actress Jolina Magdangal. But due to the show's twist of events, her mentor Jolina had to let her go and award-winning actress Gina Alajar became her new mentor, and by October 21, 2012 she became one of the runners-up, along with Zandra Summer, Mikoy Morales and Ruru Madrid, while Thea Tolentino and Jeric Gonzales were pronounced the Season 2 ultimate winners.

In 2013, after her debut in Protégé, Ramirez was cast in the fantasy-drama series Pyra: Babaeng Apoy, together with her co-Protégé stars Thea Tolentino, Jeric Gonzales, Zandra Summer, and veteran actresses Angelu de Leon and Gladys Reyes. Since then, she had been cast in various TV series and anthologies throughout her career.

== Filmography ==
=== Television ===
Year	Title	Role
2026	Apoy sa Dugo	Maya
2025	My Father's Wife	Olga
2025	Lilet Matias: Attorney-at-Law	
2024	Asawa ng Asawa Ko	Yvonne
2023	Black Rider	Blessie
2023	Magandang Dilag	Lily Bunayog
2022	Bolera	Macy "Amazing Macy" delos Reyes
2019	Magpakailanman: Adik Sa 'Yo (The Radji Kem Calos Story)	Maria
2019	One of the Baes	young Jo Rubio
2019	Dragon Lady	Salve Miranda / Scorfiona
2019	Tadhana: Libya	Hana
2019	Magpakailanman: From Poser to Forever (The Marvin and Jane Bedonia Love Story)	Ate Cel
2019	Imbestigador: Bata sa Tulay	Melody
2019	Magpakailanman: Fathers and Lovers	Berna
2018	Wagas: Pag-ibig at Lagim	Gloria
2018	Dear Uge: Kasal o Bawi, Kasal-Sakali	Roxan
2018	My Special Tatay	Young Sheila Flores
2018	Kapag Nahati ang Puso	Chloe
2018	Magpakailanman: Jackpot ng Buhay (The Wowowin Winners Story)	Yanyan
2018	Tadhana: Hulicam	Lorna
2018	Wagas: Mahal Ko, Kakambal ng Engkanto	Rhodora
2018	Stories for the Soul: Kasama Mo ang Diyos	Sonia
2018	Road Trip	Herself / Guest
2018	The One That Got Away	Yvette
2017	Kambal, Karibal	Jane
2017	Daig Kayo ng Lola Ko: Alamat ni Bernardo Carpio	Fe
2017	Ika-6 na Utos	Kenya
2017	Magpakailanman: My Unlawful Husband	Gina
2017	Tadhana: Hagod	Annisa
2017	Alyas Robin Hood	Susan Meneses
2017	Wagas: You & Me and Epilepsy	
2017	Magpakailanman: May Forever! (The Ariel Cruz and Julieta Manuel Story)	Jam
2017	Mulawin vs. Ravena	Uyak
2017	D' Originals	Tanya
2017	Karelasyon: Biglang Yaman	Baby Girl
2017	Pinulot Ka Lang sa Lupa	Macy Montenegro
2016	Hanggang Makita Kang Muli	Charmaine "Charm" Alvarez
2015	The Half Sisters	Ericka Abarrientos
2015	Healing Hearts	Cecille
2014	Maynila: Walang Duda, Ikaw Na!	Ana
2014	Ilustrado	Narcisa
2014	Seasons of Love: My Soulmate, My Soulhate	Emily
2014	Dading	Glenda
2013	Pyra: Babaeng Apoy	Cindy del Fierro
2013	Home Sweet Home	Chinggay
2013	Teen Gen	Jenny
2012	Protégé: The Battle For The Big Artista Break	Herself / Runner-Up

=== Movies ===
Year	Title	Role
2014	Overtime	Joanne
