= Stories for the Soul =

Philippine television drama series

- Title card
- Genre: Drama
- Presented by: Manny Pacquiao
- Country of origin: Philippines
- Original language: Tagalog
- No. of episodes: 17

Production
- Camera setup: Multiple-camera setup
- Running time: 30–45 minutes
- Production company: GMA Entertainment Group

Original release
- Network: GMA Network
- Release: October 29, 2017 – June 30, 2019

Stories for the Soul is a Philippine television drama anthology series broadcast by GMA Network. Hosted by Manny Pacquiao, it premiered on October 29, 2017 on the network's Sunday Grande sa Gabi line up. The series concluded on June 30, 2019, with a total of 17 episodes.

== Premise ==
The show features stories inspired by characters and stories from the Bible.

== Episodes ==
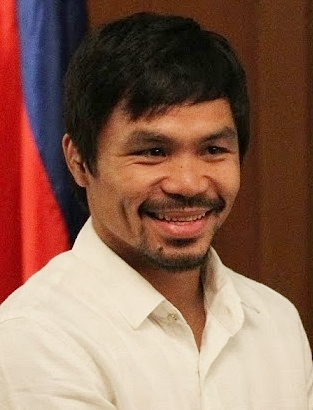
Manny Pacquiao served as the host.

Episodes of Stories for the Soul
No.	Title	Original air date	Cast	Ref.
1	"Hanggang Saan, Hanggang Kailan?"	October 29, 2017	Mike Tan, Andrea Torres, Koreen Medina, Shamaine Buencamino, Ranty Portento	
2	"Santa Makasalanan"	November 26, 2017	Jennylyn Mercado, Julio Diaz, Elizabeth Oropesa, Jacob Briz, Sarah Gil, Eddie Ngo	
3	"Alibughang Anak"	December 24, 2017	Jeric Gonzales, Martin del Rosario, Juan Rodrigo	
4	"Kasama Mo ang Diyos"	January 28, 2018	Benjamin Alves, Frances Makil-Ignacio, Elle Ramirez, Toby Alejar, Catherine Rem	
5	"Rehas"	February 25, 2018	Paolo Contis, Rodjun Cruz, Leanne Bautista, Zofia Edozma	
6	"Private Zoo"	April 1, 2018	Rocco Nacino, Nicole Kim Donesa, Ping Medina, Crispin Pineda	
7	"Beauty Queen"	April 29, 2018	Max Collins, Lucho Ayala, Maricar de Mesa, Ces Aldaba	
8	"Tinig ng Pananalig"	May 27, 2018	Gabby Eigenmann, Valerie Concepcion, Yasser Marta, Jojo Alejar, Caprice Cayetano	
9	"Maghihintay ang Walang Hanggan"	June 24, 2018	Sheena Halili, Diana Zubiri, Wendell Ramos, Rolando Innocencio, Irene Celebre	
10	"Sa Aking Mga Kamay"	July 29, 2018	Ervic Vijandre, Kim Domingo, Irma Adlawan, Allan Paule, Dominic Roco	
11	"The Better Sister"	August 26, 2018	Kris Bernal, Thea Tolentino, Mikoy Morales, Bryce Eusebio, Gigi Locsin	
12	"Tenement"	September 30, 2018	Neil Ryan Sese, Ana Roces, Pauline Mendoza, Will Ashley, Rob Moya	
13	"Ang Proyekto"	October 28, 2018	Gardo Versoza, Lovely Rivero, Paul Salas, Jay Arcilla, Archi Adamos	
14	"Bespren"	March 31, 2019	Angel Guardian, Jake Vargas, Dave Bornea, Mikoy Morales, Yasser Marta, Karlo Duterte, Kevin Sagra, Michael Angelo Lobrin	
15	"Inang 'Di Patitinag"	April 28, 2019	Lotlot de Leon, Jak Roberto, Migo Adecer, Emilio Garcia, Cheska Diaz	
16	"Bad Sam"	May 26, 2019	Jeric Gonzales, Rita Daniela, Lilet, Phytos Ramirez, Tom Olivar	
17	"Uhaw ng Tubig"	June 30, 2019	Diana Zubiri, Marco Alcaraz, Elijah Alejo, Kelvin Miranda	

== Ratings ==
According to AGB Nielsen Philippines' Nationwide Urban Television Audience Measurement People in television homes, the pilot episode of Stories for the Soul earned a 2.4% rating.

== Accolades ==
Accolades received by Stories for the Soul
Year	Award	Category	Recipient	Result	Ref.
2019	Anak TV Seal Awards		Stories for the Soul	Won	
