= Pyra: Babaeng Apoy =

2013 Philippine television drama series

- Title card
- Also known as: Pyra: Fire Woman
- Genre: Fantasy drama
- Developed by: Geng Delgado
- Written by: Ana Aleta-Nadela; Rhona Lean Sales; Geng Delgado
- Directed by: Roderick Lindayag
- Creative director: Jun Lana
- Starring: Thea Tolentino
- Theme music composer: George Canseco
- Opening theme: "Saan Darating ang Umaga?" by Kyla
- Country of origin: Philippines
- Original language: Tagalog
- No. of episodes: 70

Production
- Executive producer: May Joy Lumboy-Pili
- Production locations: Pasig, Philippines
- Camera setup: Multiple-camera setup
- Running time: 30–45 minutes
- Production company: GMA Entertainment TV

Original release
- Network: GMA Network
- Release: August 26 – November 29, 2013

Pyra: Babaeng Apoy (trans. / international title: Pyra: Fire Woman) is a 2013 Philippine television drama fantasy series broadcast by GMA Network. Directed by Roderick Lindayag, it stars Thea Tolentino in the title role. It premiered on August 26, 2013 on the network's Afternoon Prime line up. The series concluded on November 29, 2013, with a total of 70 episodes.

The series is streaming online on YouTube.

== Cast and characters ==
Cast

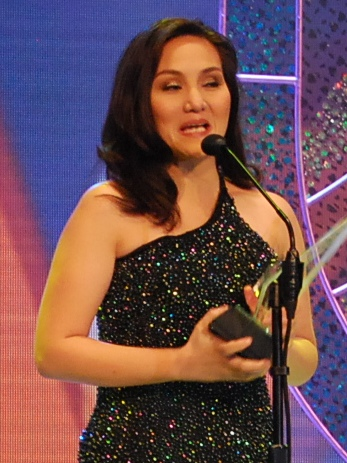
Gladys Reyes

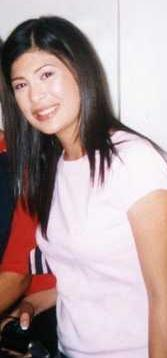
Roxanne Guinoo

Lead cast

- Thea Tolentino as Pyra del Fierro-Calida

Supporting cast

- Jeric Gonzales as Jeffrey Calida
- Elle Ramirez as Cindy del Fierro
- Angelu de Leon as Merly Lucente
- Gladys Reyes as Susan del Fierro
- Ryan Eigenmann as Daniel del Fierro
- Roxanne Guinoo as Barbara del Fierro
- Polo Ravales as Tito
- Christopher Roxas as Ramon
- Tess Bomb as Lucinda
- Zandra Summer as Ena
- Teejay Marquez as Beto
- Janno Gibbs as Aidan

Guest cast

- Bembol Roco as Ferman del Fierro
- DJ Durano as Cesar Lucente
- Maricel Morales as Loreta Calida
- Jenny Miller as Osang
- German Moreno as Sirko
- Rich Asuncion as Anna

== Ratings ==
According to AGB Nielsen Philippines' Mega Manila household television ratings, the pilot episode of Pyra: Babaeng Apoy earned a 15.6% rating. The final episode scored a 14.1% rating.
