= Krizza =

Studio album by Krizza Neri
- Released: June 19, 2012
- Genre: Soul; Pop; OPM
- Length: 46:58
- Label: Blackbird Music; Universal Records
- Producer: Aiza Seguerra

Singles from Krizza
- 1. "Ba't 'Di Ko Ba Nasabi" Released: June 19, 2012

Krizza is a 2012 album by Krizza Neri. Aiza Seguerra produced the album under her own label Blackbird Music.

== Track listing ==
No.	Title	Writer(s)	Length
1.	"Narda"	Jay Contreras	3:11
2.	"Dahil Sayo"	Laarni Matta Macaraeg	4:28
3.	"No More You and Me"	Nyoy Volante	3:05
4.	"Bakit Ka Lumayo"	Ogie Alcasid	5:13
5.	"Could've Been"	Lois Blaisch	4:25
6.	"Look My Way"	Noel Trinidad	4:16
7.	"Don't Be Too Nice"	Jude Gitamondoc	3:53
8.	"French Fries and Coke"	Jude Gitamondoc	4:37
9.	"If I Could / Wind Beneath My Wings"	Ken Hirsch, Marti Sharron, Ron Miller / Jeff Silbar, Larry Henley	3:11
10.	"Kung Malalaman Mo"	Ryan Cayabyab	5:47
11.	"Ba't 'Di Ko Ba Nasabi"	Sherwin Castillo, Mike Tan	4:52
