= Jensen Kyra =

- Born: Jensen Kyra; September 29, 1993 (age 32); Manila, Philippines
- Occupations: Singer; actress; Tv Presenter; humanitarian
- Years active: 2003–present
- Agent: Viva Artists Agency
- Musical career
- Genres: Pop; pop jazz; soul; broadway; pop soul; rhythm and blues; funk rock; disco; post-disco; dance-pop; new jack swing
- Instruments: Vocals; Piano
- Label: Viva Records

Jensen Kyra (born September 29, 1993) is a French Filipino singer, producer, entrepreneur and educator living in Switzerland. She was the host of the lifestyle series Star Homes on Viva TV.

== Early life ==
Kyra started singing at age 3. She has a younger sister named Janine Teñoso who is known as the "OST Princess" in the Philippines.

She started her career as a performer at the age of 6, singing in TV commercials and mall shows. As a child, she was also a competitive swimmer.

Jensen Kyra joined numerous singing competitions representing her school since middle school days. One of the most notable singing competitions she joined was the Nationwide Search for PLDT Singing Idol; in which Asia's Popstar, Sarah Geronimo also joined in her first years of singing career. Although joining every year, she only won the title twice in the year 2010 and 2011. Her first TV show guesting wes on "Walang Tulugan with the Master Showman".

She eventually joined the reality singing search of GMA Network's Protege: The Battle for the Big Break and was later on included as a regular artist in the noontime variety show of the same TV network, Party Pilipinas. She was hired by Chinese-Filipino tycoon Roberto Ongpin to become the Entertainment Director of Alphaland Corporation handling two island resorts in the Pacific.

== Singing career ==
=== 2011 ===
She was on TV5's Willing Willie wherein she was the grand winner in the Kantanong Segment. In April, she joined GMA7's Protege: The Battle for the Big Break. After the competition, she signed a contract with GMA Artist Center. She appeared on following TV Shows: Party Pilipinas, Bubble Gang, Unang Hirit.

=== 2012–2016 ===
She went to theater arts and played Cinderella of "Into the Woods" under the production of Trumpets Playshop. She also portrayed Wendy of KIDS ACTS Philippines' "Peter Pan" in Star Theater, Cultural Center of the Philippines. She also performed in Movie Stars Cafe and played various lead roles of musicals such as Gia of Madagascar, Queen Elsa of Frozen, Cleopatra of The Mummy Returns, Sandy of Grease, and Bella Swan of Twilight Musical. In 2015, she was a performer in City of Dreams Manila for a regular show that lasted 6 months. In 2016, she performed at the launch of Miss Universe 2016 held in Manila, Philippines. In 2016, Kyra also competed in Tawag ng Tanghalan, where she sang songs including "You and I" by Lady Gaga.

=== 2017–2018 ===
In 2017, Kyra hosted the Viva TV show Star Homes. She released her first single under VIVA records entitled, LAPIT KA.
