= 1st Ko Si 3rd =

2014 Filipino film

1st Ko Si 3rd, also known as Third Is My First, is a 2014 Filipino comedy-drama film written and directed by Real Florido and produced by Anter San Agustin under Firestarters Productions. The film was an official selection to the 2014 Cinemalaya Independent Film Festival under the New Breed Category. It stars Nova Villa, Freddie Webb, Ken Chan, Dante Rivero, RJ Agustin and Denise Barbacena.

== Summary ==
A woman is anticipating the beginning of a lengthy retirement with her husband. However, she soon becomes restless, and when an old flame unexpectedly reappears, she is forced to reflect on her past.

== Awards and festivals ==
Award	Date of ceremony	Category	Recipient(s)	Result	Source
Cinemalaya Independent Film Festival	August 8, 2014	Best Actor	Dante Rivero	Won	
QCinema	February 18, 2014	Gender Sensitivity Award	Firestarters Productions	Won	
HIFF	November 2014	Official Selection	Real Florido		
Canada International Film Festival	April 12, 2015	Rising Star Award for Full-length Feature Director	Real Florido	Won	
The Jersey City International TV & Film Festival	October 16, 2015	Official Selection	Real Florido		
