= Yani =

Yani (Bulgarian: Яни) is a given name and a surname. Notable people with the name include:

== Given name ==
- Yan' Dargent (1824–1899), French painter
- Yani Gellman (born 1985), Canadian actor
- Yani Ignatov (born 1959), Bulgarian rower
- Yani Marchokov (born 1975), Qatari weightlifter
- Yani Pehlivanov (born 1988), Bulgarian footballer
- Yani Rosenthal (born 1965), Honduran businessman and politician
- Yani Stevenheydens (born 2006), Belgian racing driver
- Yani Tseng (born 1989), Taiwanese golfer
- Yani Urdinov (born 1991), Macedonian footballer
- Yani Xander (born 1997), Bulgarian Actor

== Surname ==
- Ahmad Yani (1922–1965), Indonesian general
- Michael Yani (born 1980), American tennis player
- Wang Yani (born 1975), Chinese artist

== See also ==
- Yanni (disambiguation)
