= Krizza Neri =

Filipino musician

- Born: Krizza Nikka Neri; June 28, 1995 (age 31)
- Origin: Cagayan de Oro, Misamis Oriental, Philippines
- Genres: Pop, P-pop
- Occupation: Singer
- Instrument: Vocals
- Years active: 2011–present
- Label: Universal Records (2012–present)

Krizza Nikka Neri (born June 28, 1995) is a Filipina singer. She won at Protégé: The Battle for the Big Break, a singing competition on GMA Network.

== Biography ==
=== Early life ===
Neri is the daughter of a professional singer.

In 2008, she performed in the Mindanao Pop Idol singing contest and placed second. Neri used an uploaded video of herself singing on YouTube.

She was a fan of Kapuso Actresses Kris Bernal and Jennica Garcia before joining Protégé.

=== 2011: Protégé ===
On August 10, 2011, she auditioned for Aiza Seguerra at SM City Cagayan de Oro. Seguerra chose Neri, Mark Gregory King and Zibrille Pepito as potential protégés. Neri won a face-off competition by singing "No One" to become Seguerra's official protégé. Neri was the first grand winner of Protégé: The Battle for the Big Break even though she had been twice in the bottom two.

When she was declared as the grand winner of the show, she willingly shared her condo unit with Lovely Embuscado, the protégé of Jaya.

=== 2012–present: Krizza ===
After winning Protégé: The Battle For The Big Break, Krizza was welcomed in the Sunday musical variety show, Party Pilipinas. She became a regular performer until the show's cancellation. Neri released her self-titled debut studio album on June 19, 2012. Her debut single, "Ba't 'Di Ko Ba Nasabi?" was used as an original soundtrack for GMA's afternoon program The Good Daughter, top-billed by Kylie Padilla and Rocco Nacino. Krizza is produced by Blackbird Music and distributed under Universal Records.

== Discography ==
- 2012: Krizza

== Tours ==
- 2012: The Protégé and the Mentor

== Filmography ==
=== Television ===
Year	Title	Role	Network	Note(s)
2011	Protégé: The Battle for the Big Break	Herself/Contestant/Performer	GMA Network	Winner
2011–2012	Countdown To 2012: The GMA New Year Special	Herself/Guest	GMA Network	
2012–2013	Party Pilipinas	Herself/Guest	GMA Network	
2012–2013	Win na Win sa 2013: The GMA New Year Countdown Special	Herself/Guest	GMA Network	
2013–2014	Sunday All Stars	Herself/Guest	GMA Network	Guest performer of "Ligang ILike" team and "Paborito" segment
2014	Mars	Herself/Guest	GMA News TV	November 24, 2014 episode, with Mark Herras

== See also ==
- Jonalyn Viray
- Gerald Santos
- Maricris Garcia
- Gretchen Espina
- Frencheska Farr

Awards and achievements
Preceded by New	Protege; 2011 (season 1)	Succeeded by Thea Tolentino
