= Abel Estanislao =

Filipino actor and model

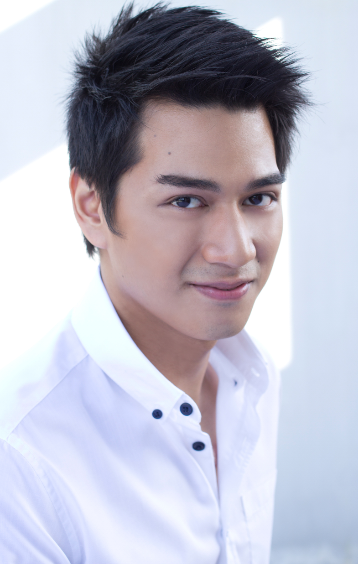
- Born: Enrico Abel Estanislao; May 19, 1995 (age 30); Marikina, Philippines
- Occupations: Musician, actor, model
- Years active: 2012–2016

Abel Estanislao (born May 19, 1995, in Marikina, Philippines) is a Filipino actor and model. He is notable in Teen Gen as Jose Vicente "JV" Cortez and one of three members in the 3Logy Band. He is an Argentine-Filipino.

== Career ==
Abel Estanislao started his acting career when he landed the role of Jose Vicente "JV" Cortez in the youth oriented series of GMA Network called Teen Gen where he was paired with Sunyee Maluche, also a newcomer. Since then, he has appeared in a number of television dramas with his home network, GMA7.

It has been said that Estanislao's looks have a resemblance to veteran Filipino actor Ping Medina. Estanislao is the nephew of actor Jay Ilagan, husband of actress Amy Austria; and he is also the distant relative of actors Janno Gibbs and Dexter Doria.

In 2014, Estanislao became a member of musical trio 3logy, along with his Teen Gen co-star and best friend and "older brother" Jeric Gonzales and Jak Roberto. Their first song is the revival of Jolina Magdangal's hit Maybe It's You.

== Filmography ==
=== Television ===
Year	Title	Role(s)
2012–2013	Teen Gen	Jose Vicente "JV" Cortez
2013	Bubble Gang	Himself
2013	Maghihintay Pa Rin	Adult Cholo Sebastian
2013	Villa Quintana	Miggy
2014	The Half Sisters	Gino
2015	Let the Love Begin	Makoy
2015	Healing Hearts	Earl
2015	Maynila: Moments In Time	Adam
2015	Little Nanay	Carlo
2016	Maynila: Lovely Revenge	Alvin

== Discography ==
- Maybe It's You (3logy)

== See also ==
- Jak Roberto
- Jeric Gonzales
