= Real Florido =

Filipino film director

Real S. Florido is an independent film director in the Philippines and Mass Communications graduate from the Pamantasan ng Lungsod ng Maynila. His indie film Saan Nagtatago si Happiness? was one of the eight finalists in the 2006 Cinemalaya Philippine Independent Film Festival. A year earlier, he was assistant director of ICU Bed # 7, which was one of the nine finalists in the 2005 Cinemalaya. Meanwhile, his 18-minute short film Parang Sirang Plaka was one of the eight short films that competed in the Digital Lokal category of the 2007 Cinemanila International Film Festival held last August. Parang Sirang Plaka was also an official selection to the 4th Chicago Fil-Am Film Festival in 2007.

In 2008, he made a two-minute short film entitled Mr. Perfect for the Shoot4life.tv's 24-hour Filmmarthon for International Blood Donation Campaign in Hungary. The short film made it to the 16 Supreme Films list of the said competition. In 2010, the 2-minute film was awarded 3rd place for people's choice in the first 180 Micro Cinema FestIVAL, an online film competition headed by the Film Development Council of the Philippines.

He also created the reality singing search Protégé: The Battle For The Big Break and Taste Buddies for GMA 7. He was also part of the team that created Party Pilipinas.

His debut film 1st Ko Si 3rd, starring Nova Villa and Freddie Webb, competed in Cinemalaya 2014 and was awarded Best Actor for Dante Rivero's performance. Nova Villa also got her first Gawad Urian nomination for her performance in this film. The film was also chosen in London Film Awards, Canada International Film Festival, Jersey City International Film Festival, Hawaii International Film Festival and won Gender Sensitivity Award in QCinema International Film Festival 2014.

Florido is currently the Chief Creative Officer of CreaZion Studios, a creative and productions company that he co-founded back in 2023 together with Anter San Agustin AKA RJ Agustin.
