= Protégé: The Battle for the Big Break =

- Season's title card
- Genre: Interactive reality television talent show
- Created by: GMA Entertainment TV Group; Rommel Gacho; Real Florido
- Starring: Hosts: Dingdong Dantes; Ogie Alcasid; Jennylyn Mercado; Judges: Bert de Leon; Joey de Leon; Louie Ocampo; Eula Valdez
- Country of origin: Philippines
- No. of episodes: 106

Production
- Executive producer: Wilma Galvante
- Running time: 1 hour (Gala night); 15 minutes (Inside Protege)

Original release
- Network: GMA Network
- Release: September 4 – December 18, 2011

Protégé: The Battle for the Big Break is a 2011 reality-based singing talent show created by Real Florido for GMA Network. It is hosted by Ogie Alcasid, as the journey host, Dingdong Dantes as gala presenter, and Jennylyn Mercado, the show's reality host. It is the first season of GMA's reality talent program, Protégé.

The show was first intended to be a "talent search" similar to StarStruck and Protégé might have been the replacement of the said show.

This show is stapled the timeslot between the two talent shows from other rival shows with ABS-CBN's Pilipinas Got Talent and TV5's Talentadong Pinoy.

The result reveals right after the performance. The first two results nights were shown one hour after the performance of the finalists. The judges, on the other hand are happy that their opinions matter in this contest, since the results will not depend solely on text votes.

== Overview ==
Hosts

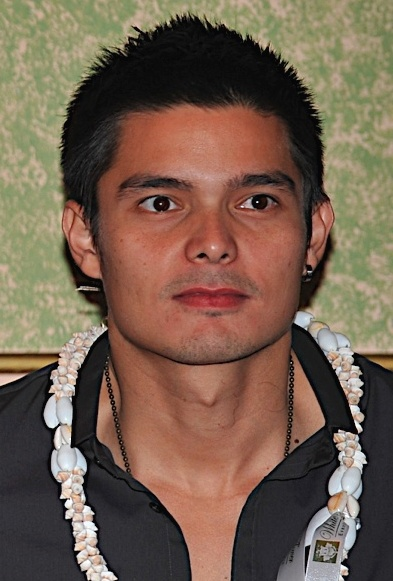
Dingdong Dantes

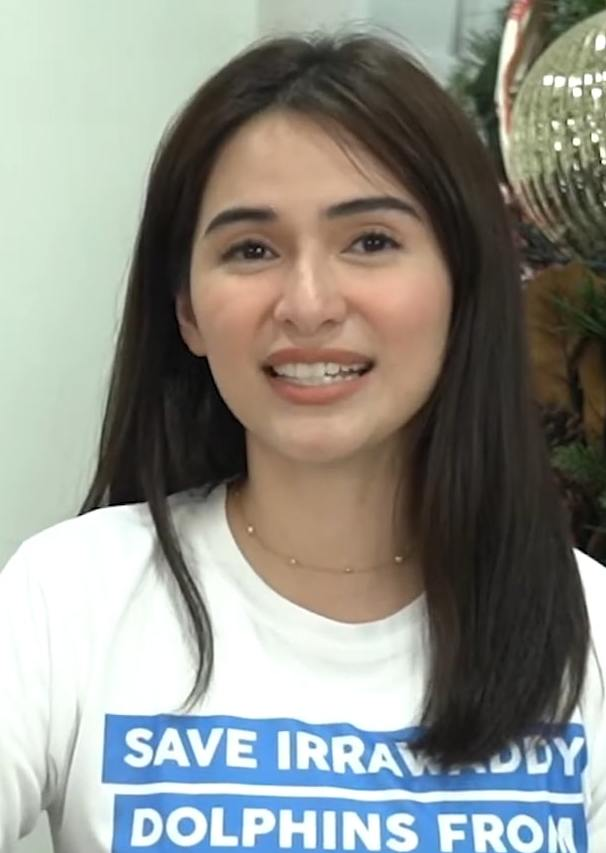
Jennylyn Mercado

In Protégé: The Battle for the Big Break, 10 legendary music icons groom their own bets to be music's biggest phenomenon. As the competition open its doors to a wide array of talent, performances are bound to be spectacular and exciting. But this is not only a battle for the aspirants.

With revered and lauded mentors who have established their names in the music industry also vying for the same prize, drama and tension will sure arise. Their reputation and credibility at stake, their mentoring techniques will also be scrutinized.

== Mentors and judges ==
=== Mentors ===
- Aiza Seguerra
- Claire de la Fuente
- Gloc-9
- Imelda Papin
- Janno Gibbs
- Jaya
- Jay-R
- Joey Generoso
- Rachelle Ann Go
- Rey Valera

=== Judges ===
- Joey de Leon (Face-off and Gala Judge)
- Bert de Leon (Face-off and Gala Judge)
- Louie Ocampo (Gala Judge)
- Homer Flores (Face-off Judge)
- Eula Valdez (Gala Judge)

==== Guest judge ====
- Cherie Gil (October 30, 2011, Finals December 18, 2011)

== Auditions ==
Title card used during the auditions and promotion of the show

Cities where the auditions were held

Dubbed in the show as The Hunt, the mentors were tasked to roam around the country and scour different provinces and cities to find the best music acts that may become their bets for the competition.

This is the first level of the competition wherein the mentors will invade their assigned audition sites.

The mentors will be the guide of the protégés. They will groom and help the contestants to stay in the competition. A mentor's role is make his or her protégé shine.

They will be aided by two Audition Masters in searching for their protégés. These two audition masters are renowned starmaker Jojie Dingcong and GMA Artist Center Head Arsi Baltazar.

Aspiring protégés will come from two sources. First is the pre-screening done by the Audition Masters before the Regionals Proper. Second are the aspirants personally invited by the mentors based on the research that the staff conducted.

When faced with the mentors, the aspiring protégés will hear Yes if they are to be considered for the next round or No if they are not. Those who got a Yes will be pooled and the mentors will choose only three each that they will take with them to Manila.

Casting dates	Venues	City
July 15, 2011	SM City Naga	Naga
July 17, 2011	SM City Cebu	Cebu
July 22, 2011	SM City Iloilo	Iloilo
July 24, 2011	SM City Batangas	Batangas
July 29, 2011	NE Pacific Mall	Cabanatuan
July 31, 2011	SM City Pampanga	San Fernando
August 5, 2011	SM City Davao	Davao
August 7, 2011	CSI Mall	Dagupan
August 10, 2011	SM City Cagayan de Oro	Cagayan de Oro
August 12–13, 2011	SM Mall of Asia	Pasay

== Face-off round ==
After the provincial auditions in The Hunt round, the mentors are left with three protégés each, completing the Top 30 protégés. This is considered to be the semi-final round.

These Top 30 protégés competes with each other in the face-off round where individual acts performs in front of the three judges. The judges then tell the mentors which of the three should be their protégé that they will pit against the other mentors' protégés.

Thus, at the end of the face-off round, every mentor will only have one protégé each. Only ten protégés will compete in the next round.

=== Top 30 face-off contenders ===
Location	Mentor	Top 3 protégés	Song choice	Original artist	Result
Dagupan	Joey Generoso	Wilson Peñaflor; Aubrey Cabanlig; Samantha Felizco	Original song "Kahit Isang Saglit" "Rolling in the Deep"	Wilson Peñaflor; Martin Nievera; Adele	Eliminated; Eliminated; Advanced
Cabanatuan	Jay-R	Kenneth Monico; Cercado Sisters; Allen Sta.Maria	"On Bended Knee" "Show Me How You Burlesque" "Ikaw"	Boyz II Men; Christina Aguilera; Regine Velasquez	Advanced; Eliminated; Eliminated
Pampanga	Rey Valera	Jethro Adriano; Renwick Benito; Gabriel Bolden; Julie Mae Barrios; Si Pilyo; So Wat?	"Hey Jude" "I'll Be There" "Ain't No Mountain High Enough"	The Beatles; The Jackson 5 Marvin Gaye & Tammi Terrell	Eliminated; Eliminated; Advanced
Batangas	Claire Dela Fuente	Via Samantha Mojado; Jensen Teñoso; M.O.S.T. (Men of Soul & Talent)	"Ikaw Ang Aking Pangarap" "Stand Up for Love" "When You Believe"	Martin Nievera; Destiny's Child; Mariah Carey & Whitney Houston	Eliminated; Advanced; Eliminated
Naga	Imelda Papin	VIP Singers; Jobert Nosidal; Rosalyn Navarro	"Habang May Buhay" "May Bukas Pa" "I Will Always Love You"	Afterimage; Rico J. Puno; Dolly Parton	Eliminated; Eliminated; Advanced
Manila	Gloc-9	Derf Cabael; Denise Barbacena; Kristina Laguitan	"All in Love is Fair" "Pag-ibig Ko'y Pansinin" "Dangerously in Love 2"	Stevie Wonder; Faith Cuneta; Beyoncé Knowles	Eliminated; Advanced; Eliminated
Iloilo	Janno Gibbs	Lirah Bermudez; Ricky Deloviar; Alejandro	"I Will Survive" / "Hush Hush" "Straight from the Heart" "Broken Vow"	Gloria Gaynor / Pussycat Dolls; Bryan Adams; Lara Fabian	Advanced; Eliminated; Eliminated
Cebu	Rachelle Ann Go	Blasians; Nomer Limatog Jr. Rhey "Regina" Otic	"Lady Marmalade" "Don't Stop Believin'" "What Kind of Fool Am I?"	Labelle; Journey; Anthony Newley	Eliminated; Advanced; Eliminated
Cagayan de Oro	Aiza Seguerra	Mark Gregory King; Zibrille Pepito; Krizza Neri	"Ordinary People" "Decode" "No One"	John Legend; Paramore; Alicia Keys	Eliminated; Eliminated; Advanced
Davao	Jaya	Archimedes Udaundo; Joshua Fresco; Lovely Embuscado	"Hanggang" "Grenade" "Hurt"	Wency Cornejo; Bruno Mars; Christina Aguilera	Eliminated; Eliminated; Advanced

== Finalists ==
=== Winner ===
- Krizza Neri (RnB Sistah) (born June 28, 1995) is from Cagayan de Oro, Philippines and was 16 years old at the time of the show. She auditioned at SM City Cagayan de Oro in front of the assigned mentor, Aiza Seguerra with Beyoncé Knowles' "Halo and Nicki Minaj's "Super Bass". She also performed "No One" in the Face-off Round. Neri was announced as the winner on December 18, 2011.

=== Runners up ===
- Lirah Bermudez ("Pop Sweetheart") (born April 9, 1998) is from Capiz and was 13 years old at the time of the show. She auditioned at SM City Iloilo in front of the assigned mentor, Janno Gibbs with Train's "Hey, Soul Sister. She also performed "I Will Survive" by Gloria Gaynor and Pussycat Dolls' "Hush Hush". During the show, she said that she is dedicating her performances in the competition to her brother who lost his life to a brain tumor. Bermudez was announced as one of the runners-up with Lovely Embuscado on December 18, 2011.
- Lovely Embuscado ("The Singing Cinderella") (born October 25, 1998) who grew up in Tagum, Davao Del Norte, is the official protégé of Jaya. Lovely used to sing in front of her pet pigs. She was 12 years at the time of the show. She auditioned at SM City Davao in front of Jaya with Celine Dion's "Then You Look at Me". She sang "Hurt" in the face-off round and advanced to the finals. She was eliminated on November 20, 2011, but was able to come back due to the wildcard round. Embuscado was announced as one of the runners-up with Lirah Bermudez on December 18, 2011.

=== Top 10 ===
- Jensen Teñoso ("The Sultry Charmer") (born September 29, 1993) is from Batangas and celebrated her 18th birthday during the show's run. She auditioned at SM City Batangas wherein she was chosen as one of the protégés of the assigned mentor, Claire de la Fuente. She performed Destiny's Child's "Stand Up for Love in the face-off round and advanced to the finals. Teñoso was eliminated on December 11, 2011 and came in fourth or fifth place with Nomer Limatog, Jr..
- Nomer Limatog, Jr. ("Bibong Showstopper") who hails from Cebu is the official protégé of Rachelle Ann Go. Joining the competition at the age of 10, he is the youngest among the finalists. He sang "Don't Stop Believin' by The Journey in the face-off round. Limatog was eliminated on November 13, 2011 but returned thanks to the wildcard round. Limatog finished in fourth or fifth place with Jensen Teñoso on December 11, 2011.
- Kenneth Monico ("Soul Heartthrob") (born September 18, 1991) who represents Cabanatuan is the official protégé of Jay-R. While in the audition, Monico said that he recently suffered from dengue before joining the show. He auditioned at NE Pacific Mall and chose as one of Jay-R's protégés. He sang Boyz II Men's "On Bended Knee" in the face-off round and advanced to the finals. He was eliminated on December 4, 2011, and came in sixth or seventh place with Rey Valera's So Wat?.
- So Wat? ("Lovesome Foursome") is the only group entry in the competition. They are Janina Gonzales, Kyrsty Alde, Sander Sigurdson and Ermund Regacion, who auditioned individually; the group was formed by their mentor, Rey Valera. The day before the face-off round, the two girls finally came back to the show as the mentor thought that Janina and Kyrsty would not join anymore since they were not allowed at first by their respective parents. They performed "Ain't No Mountain High Enough" in the face-off round with negative comments. They were eliminated on December 4, 2011, and came in sixth or seventh place with Kenneth Monico. Prior to their elimination, So Wat? had never been in the bottom group.
- Denise Barbacena ("Sweet Siren") (born October 31, 1994) is from Manila and was 16 years old at the time of the show. She is the official protégé of Gloc-9. After her audition, Gloc-9 told her that she has that "magic" that he has been looking for. She advanced to the finals in the face-off round with Faith Cuneta's "Pag-ibig Ko'y Pansinin". She was eliminated on November 6, 2011, and finished in eighth place.
- Samantha Felizco ("Urban Pop Gurl") who auditioned in Dagupan, is the official protégé of Joey Generoso. Felizco is originally from Marikina as it was seen on the television during her audition. Joey's way of mentoring Samantha is through exposing her in Side A's concerts as an opening act. With Adele's "Rolling in the Deep" in the face-off round, she advanced to the finals. She got eliminated on October 30, 2011, and came in ninth place.
- Rosalyn Navarro ("Prima Biritera") is the official protégé of Imelda Papin representing the Bicol Region. She sang Dolly Parton's "I Will Always Love You" in the face-off round that gave her a spot in the finals. She was eliminated on October 23, 2011, and came in tenth place.

== Finals ==
=== Top 10 (first week) – Protégé's Pick ===
Order	Mentor	Protégé	Song (original artist)	Result
1	Rachelle Ann Go	Nomer Limatog, Jr.	"Rolling in the Deep" (Adele)	Safe
2	Aiza Seguerra	Krizza Neri	"Get Here" (Oleta Adams)	Safe
3	Claire de la Fuente	Jensen Teñoso	"I Believe" (Fantasia Barrino)	Safe
4	Janno Gibbs	Lirah Bermudez	"The Climb" (Miley Cyrus)	Safe
5	Imelda Papin	Rosalyn Navarro	"No Matter What Happens" (Barbra Streisand)	Safe
6	Joey Genoroso	Samantha Felizco	"Everytime You Lie" (Demi Lovato)	Safe
7	Jay-R	Kenneth Monico	"Go the Distance" (Roger Bart)	Safe
8	Gloc-9	Denise Barbacena	"Skyscraper" (Demi Lovato)	Safe
9	Rey Valera	So Wat?	"I'm with You" (Avril Lavigne)	Safe
10	Jaya	Lovely Embuscado	"Out Here on My Own" (Irene Cara)	Safe

=== Top 10 (second week) – Song of my Kababayan ===
The protégés' kababayan (town-mate) chose the song for their favorite via Facebook poll.

Order	Mentor	Protégé	Song (original artist)	Result
1	Jay-R	Kenneth Monico	"Grenade" (Bruno Mars)	Bottom 4
2	Jaya	Lovely Embuscado	"Total Eclipse of the Heart" (Bonnie Tyler)	Safe
3	Joey Genoroso	Samantha Felizco	"Someone Like You" (Adele)	Safe
4	Gloc-9	Denise Barbacena	"Man Down" (Rihanna)	Bottom 4
5	Claire de la Fuente	Jensen Teñoso	"Footprints in the Sand" (Leona Lewis)	Safe
6	Rey Valera	So Wat?	"My Immortal" (Evanescence)	Safe
7	Imelda Papin	Rosalyn Navarro	"Listen" (Beyoncé Knowles)	Eliminated
8	Aiza Seguerra	Krizza Neri	"Super Bass" (Nicki Minaj)	Bottom 2
9	Janno Gibbs	Lirah Bermudez	"Price Tag" (Jessie J)	Safe
10	Rachelle Ann Go	Nomer Limatog, Jr.	"You Give Love a Bad Name" (Bon Jovi)	Safe

=== Top 9 – Switch ===
A mentor chooses a competition piece for a rival protégé.
Guest Judge: Cherie Gil^{1}

Order	Mentor	Protégé	Song (original artist)	Chosen by	Result
1	Joey Genoroso	Samantha Felizco	"Decode" (Paramore)	Aiza Seguerra	Eliminated
2	Gloc-9	Denise Barbacena	"Thank You" (Dido)	Jay-R	Bottom 2
3	Rachelle Ann Go	Nomer Limatog, Jr.	"If I Had You" (Adam Lambert)	Janno Gibbs	Safe
4	Aiza Seguerra	Krizza Neri	"Could've Been" (Tiffany)	Gloc-9	Safe
5	Claire de la Fuente	Jensen Teñoso	"You and I" (Lady Gaga)	Jaya	Safe
6	Jay-R	Kenneth Monico	"Can't Keep on Loving You (From a Distance)" (Elliott Yamin)	Joey Genoroso	Bottom 3
7	Rey Valera	So Wat?	"Every Breath You Take" (The Police)	Rachelle Ann Go	Safe
8	Janno Gibbs	Lirah Bermudez	"Don't Speak" (No Doubt)	Claire de la Fuente	Safe
9	Jaya	Lovely Embuscado	"Beautiful" (Christina Aguilera)	Rey Valera	Safe

- ^Note 1 Joey de Leon was abroad at the time, so Cherie Gil took over as a guest judge.

=== Top 8 – My Shining Moment ===
The Protégé-Mentor tandems should outshine their opponents with their chosen live gala piece.

Order	Mentor	Protégé	Song (original artist)	Result
1	Jaya	Lovely Embuscado	"Pangarap na Bituin" (Sharon Cuneta)	Bottom 4
2	Jay-R	Kenneth Monico	"Open Arms" (Journey)	Safe
3	Rachelle Ann Go	Nomer Limatog, Jr.	"Baby, I Love Your Way" (Peter Frampton)	Safe
4	Janno Gibbs	Lirah Bermudez	"Bring Me to Life" (Evanescence)	Safe
5	Aiza Seguerra	Krizza Neri	"If I Ain't Got You" (Alicia Keys)	Bottom 2
6	Gloc-9	Denise Barbacena	"Sparks Fly" (Taylor Swift)	Eliminated
7	Claire de la Fuente	Jensen Teñoso	"All in Love Is Fair" (Stevie Wonder)	Bottom 4
8	Rey Valera	So Wat?	"Faithfully" (Journey)	Safe

- Note: Pinoy Pride was the original theme for the week which was later changed to My Shining Moment.

=== Top 7 – Duet with My Mentor ===
Order	Mentor	Protégé	Song (original artist)	Result
1	Janno Gibbs	Lirah Bermudez	"Tatsulok" (Bamboo) / "Nosi ba Lasi" (Sampaguita)	Safe
2	Jaya	Lovely Embuscado	"Sino ang Baliw" (Basil Valdez)	Safe
3	Claire de la Fuente	Jensen Teñoso	"Colors of the Wind" (Vanessa Williams)	Safe
4	Aiza Seguerra	Krizza Neri	"If I Could" (Celine Dion) / "Wind Beneath My Wings" (Roger Whittaker)	Safe
5	Rachelle Ann Go	Nomer Limatog, Jr.	"Bohemian Rhapsody" (Queen)	Eliminated
6	Rey Valera	So Wat?	"Malayo pa ang Umaga" (Rey Valera)	Safe
7	Jay-R	Kenneth Monico	"Lately" (Stevie Wonder)	Bottom 2

=== Top 6 – My Pinoy Battle Song ===
Original Pilipino Music (OPM) songs with a twist.

Order	Mentor	Protégé	Song (original artist)	Result
1	Rey Valera	So Wat?	"Beep Beep & Balong Malalim" (Juan de la Cruz Band) / "Bonggahan" (Sampaguita)	Safe
2	Aiza Seguerra	Krizza Neri	"Narda" (Kamikazee)	Safe
3	Jay-R	Kenneth Monico	"Bakit Pa Ba" (Jay-R)	Safe
4	Janno Gibbs	Lirah Bermudez	"Bulong" (Kitchie Nadal) / "Ang Huling El Bimbo" (Eraserheads)	Bottom 2
5	Jaya	Lovely Embuscado	"Halik" (Aegis)	Eliminated
6	Claire de la Fuente	Jensen Teñoso	"Anak" (Freddie Aguilar)	Safe

=== Wild Card ===
The 5 ex-Protégés battle to regain a spot in the contest.

Order	Mentor	Protégé	Song (original artist)	Result
1	Jaya	Lovely Embuscado	"I Believe I Can Fly" (R. Kelly)	Advanced
2	Rachelle Ann Go	Nomer Limatog, Jr.	"Sweet Child o' Mine" (Guns N' Roses)	Advanced
3	Gloc-9	Denise Barbacena	"Tuwing Umuulan at Kapiling Ka" (Basil Valdez)	Eliminated
4	Joey Genoroso	Samantha Felizco	"How to Touch a Girl" (JoJo)	Eliminated
5	Imelda Papin	Rosalyn Navarro	"The Power of Love" (Jennifer Rush)	Eliminated

=== Top 7 (again) – Dance Hits Remixed ===
Order	Mentor	Protégé	Song (original artist)	Result
1	Aiza Seguerra	Krizza Neri	"Like a Prayer" (Madonna) / "Beautiful Life" (Ace of Base)	Safe
2	Janno Gibbs	Lirah Bermudez	"Disturbia" (Rihanna) / "Sweet Dreams" (Beyoncé Knowles)	Safe
3	Jaya	Lovely Embuscado	"One Night Only" (Jennifer Holliday)	Safe
4	Rachelle Ann Go	Nomer Limatog, Jr.	"I Kissed a Girl" (Katy Perry)	Safe
5	Jay-R	Kenneth Monico	"The Edge of Glory" (Lady Gaga)	Eliminated
6	Claire de la Fuente	Jensen Teñoso	"Tearin' Up My Heart" ('N Sync)	Safe
7	Rey Valera	So Wat?	"Firework" (Katy Perry)	Eliminated

=== Top 5 – My Song, My Life ===
Order	Mentor	Protégé	Song (original artist)	Result
1	Rachelle Ann Go	Nomer Limatog, Jr.	"Angels Brought Me Here" (Guy Sebastian)	Eliminated
2	Claire de la Fuente	Jensen Teñoso	"Imagine" (John Lennon)	Eliminated
3	Jaya	Lovely Embuscado	"When You Wish upon a Star" (Cliff Edwards) / "Over the Rainbow" (Judy Garland)	Safe
4	Aiza Seguerra	Krizza Neri	"Iduyan Mo" (Basil Valdez)	Safe
5	Janno Gibbs	Lirah Bermudez	"Paglisan" (Color It Red) / "Habang May Buhay" (AfterImage)	Safe

=== Top 3 – Duet with My Mentor / My Greatest Performance ===
Order	Mentor	Protégé	Song (original artist)	Result
1	Aiza Seguerra	Krizza Neri	"There You'll Be" (Faith Hill) / "I'll Be There (For You)" (Martin Nievera)	Winner
2	Jaya	Lovely Embuscado	"Handog" (Florante) / "Minsan ang Minahal ay Ako" (Celeste Legaspi)	Runner-up
3	Janno Gibbs	Lirah Bermudez	"I'm with You" (Avril Lavigne) / "Iris" (Goo Goo Dolls)	Runner-up
4	Aiza Seguerra	Krizza Neri	"Grown-Up Christmas List" (David Foster & Natalie Cole)	Winner
5	Jaya	Lovely Embuscado	"Nais Ko" (Basil Valdez) / "Kayganda ng Ating Musika" (Hajji Alejandro)	Runner-up
6	Janno Gibbs	Lirah Bermudez	"Bakit Pa" (Jessa Zaragosa) / "Nakapagtataka" (APO Hiking Society)	Runner-up

- Group performance: "Perfect" (Pink)

== Elimination chart ==
Color key:

Male contestant
Female contestant
Group
Semi-finalist
Face-off Contenders
Top 10
Did not perform
Safe
Safe first
Safe last
Eliminated
Wild card
Finalist
Runner-up
Winner

Results per public and council votes
Stage			Face-off round			Finals									
Week			9/25	10/2	10/9	10/16	10/23	10/30	11/6	11/13	11/20	11/27	12/4	12/11	12/18
Place	Protégé	Mentor	Result												
1	Krizza Neri	Aiza Seguerra	Did not perform	Top 10	Did not perform	Safe	Bottom 2	Safe	Bottom 2	Safe	Safe	Did not perform	Safe	Safe	Protégé Battle Champ
2–3	Lirah Bermudez	Janno Gibbs	Top 10	Did not perform	Did not perform	Safe	Safe	Safe	Safe	Safe	Bottom 2	Did not perform	Safe	Safe	Runner-up
2–3	Lovely Embuscado	Jaya	Did not perform	Top 10	Did not perform	Safe	Safe	Safe	Bottom 4	Safe	Eliminated	Wild Card	Safe	Safe	Runner-up
4–5	Nomer Limatog, Jr.	Rachelle Ann Go	Top 10	Did not perform	Did not perform	Safe	Safe	Safe	Safe	Eliminated		Wild Card	Safe	Eliminated	Finalist
4–5	Jensen Teñoso	Claire de la Fuente	Did not perform	Top 10	Did not perform	Safe	Safe	Safe	Bottom 4	Safe	Safe	Did not perform	Safe	Eliminated	Finalist
6–7	Kenneth Monico	Jay-R	Top 10	Did not perform	Did not perform	Safe	Bottom 4	Bottom 3	Safe	Bottom 2	Safe	Did not perform	Eliminated		Finalist
6–7	So Wat?	Rey Valera	Did not perform	Did not perform	Top 10	Safe	Safe	Safe	Safe	Safe	Safe	Did not perform	Eliminated		Finalist
8	Denise Barbacena	Gloc 9	Did not perform	Did not perform	Top 10	Safe	Bottom 4	Bottom 2	Eliminated			Eliminated			Finalist
9	Samantha Felizco	Joey Generoso	Did not perform	Did not perform	Top 10	Safe	Safe	Eliminated				Eliminated			Finalist
10	Rosalyn Navarro	Imelda Papin	Did not perform	Top 10	Did not perform	Safe	Eliminated					Eliminated			Finalist
11–30	Derf Cabael	Gloc-9	Did not perform	Did not perform	Eliminated										Semi-finalist
11–30	Kristina Laguitan	Gloc-9	Did not perform	Did not perform	Eliminated										Semi-finalist
11–30	Aubrey Cabanlig	Joey Generoso	Did not perform	Did not perform	Eliminated										Semi-finalist
11–30	Wilson Peñaflor	Joey Generoso	Did not perform	Did not perform	Eliminated										Semi-finalist
11–30	Isaw	Rey Valera	Did not perform	Did not perform	Eliminated										Semi-finalist
11–30	Si Pilyo	Rey Valera	Did not perform	Did not perform	Eliminated										Semi-finalist
11–30	Mark Gregory	Aiza Seguerra	Did not perform	Eliminated											Semi-finalist
11–30	Zibrille Pepito	Aiza Seguerra	Did not perform	Eliminated											Semi-finalist
11–30	M.O.S.T.	Claire de la Fuente	Did not perform	Eliminated											Semi-finalist
11–30	Via Samantha Mojado	Claire de la Fuente	Did not perform	Eliminated											Semi-finalist
11–30	Jobert Nasidal	Imelda Papin	Did not perform	Eliminated											Semi-finalist
11–30	VIP Singers	Imelda Papin	Did not perform	Eliminated											Semi-finalist
11–30	Archimedes Udaundo	Jaya	Did not perform	Eliminated											Semi-finalist
11–30	Joshua Fresco	Jaya	Did not perform	Eliminated											Semi-finalist
11–30	Alejandro	Janno Gibbs	Eliminated												Semi-finalist
11–30	Ricky Deloviar	Janno Gibbs	Eliminated												Semi-finalist
11–30	Allen Sta. Maria	Jay-R	Eliminated												Semi-finalist
11–30	Cercado Sisters	Jay-R	Eliminated												Semi-finalist
11–30	Blasians	Rachelle Ann Go	Eliminated												Semi-finalist
11–30	Rhey "Regina" Otic	Rachelle Ann Go	Eliminated												Semi-finalist

== The Final Battle (finale episode) ==
In the finale episode aired live on December 18, 2011, on GMA Network and on some feeds of GMA Pinoy TV, on other feeds the program was aired as "recorded" although it did not say so but instead the Protégé logo was replaced where the "LIVE" would usually be on the original airing, all of the top three were given a 4-year STI Education for Real Life Scholarship and a 5-year contract with GMA Artist Center. Lovely Embuscado was the Texter's Choice Awardee given PhP50,000 and an exclusive Fanatxt contract from GMA New Media, Inc. and she also received the Sky Flakes Biggest Break Award which composed of PhP100,000. The winner was Krizza Nerri, the RNB Sistah. She received a PhP3,000,000 2-Bedroom Condo Unit from Suntrust Properties, Inc. and PhP1,000,000 from GMA as well as a five-year contract that the other two also received. On GMA Pinoy TV, several parts were unaired or edited out, such as Arnel Pineda's performance and the third round of the top three's performance which featured the song "Perfect" by Pink. As in past, it may have been with copyright issues with the songs featured and performed that caused those parts to be edited out and unaired internationally. But other non-copyright parts were unaired/edited out as well such as the judges final words on the three protégés and Krizza and Aiza's words after winning.

== Results show performances ==
=== Group song ===
- Top 10: Song mashup of "Under Pressure" / "Ice Ice Baby" by Queen ft. David Bowie / Vanilla Ice
- Top 8 Mentors: Medley of "Lean on Me" by Bill Withers and "I'll Stand by You" by The Pretenders
- Top 7 Protégés (Week 5): "Don't Wanna Go Home" by Jason Derulo
- Rank 7-10 Protégés: "Breakaway" by Kelly Clarkson
- Top 5 Protégés (Week 7): Mashup of "Mangarap Ka" by Afterimage and "Pagsubok" by Orient Pearl
- Top 7 Protégés (Week 8): "Flashdance... What a Feeling" by Irene Cara
- Top 5 Protégés (Week 9): "Moves Like Jagger" by Maroon 5

== See also ==
- List of programs broadcast by GMA Network
- Are You the Next Big Star?
- StarStruck
- Pinoy Idol
- Pinoy Pop Superstar
