= Mikoy Morales =

Filipino actor (born 1993)

- Born: Vincent Marco Chu Morales; December 11, 1993 (age 32); Roxas, Capiz, Philippines
- Other name: Mikoy
- Occupations: Actor; singer-songwriter; perfomer
- Years active: 2012–present
- Agent: Sparkle GMA Artist Center (2012–present)
- Known for: Bubble Gang; Pepito Manaloto; Sirkus; Lolong
- Spouse: Isa Garcia (m. 2026)

Vincent Marco "Mikoy" Chu Morales (born December 11, 1993) is a Filipino actor, singer-songwriter, and performer known for his work in television, music, and theater. He first gained recognition as a finalist in Protégé: The Battle for the Big Artista Break in 2012, where he also co-wrote the competition's theme song, "Kuwento Ng Pangarap". Morales later appeared in television series such as Teen Gen (2012–2013), Villa Quintana (2013–2014), More Than Words (2014–2015), and Pepito Manaloto (2013–present).

Beyond acting, Morales became a member of the music group Kundirana and remained active in music production and theater. He has worked as a singer, songwriter, musical director, and concert producer, and has released self-composed singles including "Pusong Hindi Makatulog" and "Sana".

== Early life ==
Vincent Marco Chu Morales was born on December 11, 1993, in Roxas, Capiz, Philippines.

== Career ==
Morales became a member of Kundirana, following singers such as Gary Valenciano and Ogie Alcasid. Before entering showbiz, he studied architecture at the University of Santo Tomas (UST). He later joined the GMA Network's talent competition Protégé: The Battle of the Big Artista Break (2012), where he finished among the six finalists alongside Jeric Gonzales and Thea Tolentino. Morales also co-wrote the song "Kuwento Ng Pangarap", which became the competition's theme song, and received a scholarship and a contract with the network afterward. He later shifted to Music Business Management at Meridian International College in McKinley, Taguig while appearing in television series such as Teen Gen (2012–2013), Villa Quintana, With a Smile (2013), and More Than Words (2014–2015). Morales also gained attention for his portrayal of a gay character in Pepito Manaloto while continuing his work as a singer, songwriter, and actor.

Morales remained active in music as both a performer and promoter of Filipino music. At 21, he produced the concert Mood Swings through SPARK Productions, featuring the music of Vincent de Jesus, known for his work in theater, television, and films such as Ang Babae sa Septic Tank (2011) and Praybeyt Benjamin (2011). Morales and his business partner organized the concert out of admiration for de Jesus' music and achievements. The event featured performers including Jett Pangan, Aiza Seguerra, Noel Cabangon, and Eula Valdez. Aside from concert production, Morales also worked as a musical director and performed in theater productions such as Kung Paano Ako Naging Leading Lady.

== Personal life ==
Morales was previously in an on-and-off relationship with Thea Tolentino. They separated in 2017, reconciled in 2019, and ended their relationship in 2020. Both said that no third party was involved and that the breakup was a mutual decision driven by their personal growth and career goals. They remained friends after the separation.

Morales began dating his non-showbiz partner, Isa Garcia, in 2021. After purchasing a house together, they became engaged in November 2025 and married on March 14 at St. John Bosco Parish. The ceremony was attended by family, close friends, and several Kapuso personalities.

== Filmography ==
=== Film ===
Year	Title	Role	Notes
2016	4 Days	Mark	
2017	Taray ni Tatay	Frenny	Telemovie by Eat Bulaga!
2019	Family History	Marcus	
2021	Mang Jose	Tope	
2023	Rookie	Coach Kel	19th Cinemalaya Independent Film Festival entry
2023	Tether	Eric	19th Cinemalaya Independent Film Festival entry
2026	58th	TBA	Adult animated film

=== Television ===
Year	Title	Role	Notes
2012	Protégé: The Battle for the Big Artista Break	Himself	Contestant, runner-up
2012	Maynila: "Perfect Someone"	John	
2012–2013	Party Pilipinas	Himself	Performer
2013	Teen Gen	Xavier de Leon	
2013	One Day, Isang Araw: Gamer Girl	Lester	
2013	Love & Lies	Kiko	Special participation
2013	With a Smile	Mikoy	
2013	My Hero Nation 4	Himself	Host
2013	Villa Quintana	Boknoy	
2013	Maynila: "Kasundan ng Puso"	Matthew	
2014	Magpakailanman: "My Lover Forever"	Older Jojo	
2014	More Than Words	Chester Balboa	
2015–present	Pepito Manaloto	Roxy	
2015–2022	Bubble Gang	Himself	Various roles
2015	Magpakailanman: "Katawan Ko, Bayaran Mo"	Glen	
2015	Marimar	Choi	
2016	Maynila: Love Prevails	Jason	
2016	Yo-Kai Watch	Whisper	Tagalog voice
2017	D' Originals	Tim	
2017	Magpakailanman: "Ang Rampa ng Buhay Ko"	Teen Sinon	
2018	Sirkus	Miko	
2018	Stories for the Soul: The Better Sister	Jack	
2018	My Special Tatay	Joselito "Ote" Mendiola	Guest
2018	Dear Uge: Mommy Home	Jay R	Guest
2019	Stories for the Soul: Bad Sam	Pete	Guest
2019	The Gift	Benedict "Bistek" Tecson	
2021	First Yaya	Jaime	
2021	I Can See you: #Future	Royce Carlos	
2022	Lolong	Victoriano "Bokyo" dela Cruz	
2023	Maging Sino Ka Man	Gordon "Bagli" Libag	
2024	Pulang Araw	Tasyo	
2025–2026	Encantadia Chronicles: Sang'gre	Agnem	

== Theater ==
Year	Production	Role	Location	Ref.
2015	Kung Paano Ako Naging Leading Lady	Henyotik	PETA Theater Center	
2023	Dicktalk	Cecile de Jesus	Carlos P. Romulo Auditorium	

== Awards and nominations ==
Award	Year	Category	Nominated work	Result	Ref.
Cinemalaya Philippine Independent Festival	2023	Best Actor	Tether	Won	
Golden Screen TV Awards	2014	Outstanding Breakthrough Performance Actor	Teen Gen	Nominated	
PMPC Star Award for Movies	2024	Indie Movie Musical Scorer of the Year	Pieta	Nominated	
PMPC Star Award for Television	2013	Best New Male TV Personality	Teen Gen	Nominated	
Septimius Awards	2024	Best Asian Actor	Tether	Nominated	
