= Jeric Gonzales =

Filipino actor

- Born: John Eric Salvanera Gonzales; August 7, 1992 (age 33); Calamba, Laguna, Philippines
- Occupations: Actor; singer; model
- Years active: 2011–present
- Agent: Sparkle GMA Artist Center
- Height: 1.78 m (5 ft 10 in)

John Eric Salvanera "Jeric" Gonzales (born August 7, 1992), (Tagalog: [ˈdʒɛɾik gɔnˈsalɛs]), is a Filipino actor, singer, and model. He is known as one of the winners of the second season of the reality show, Protégé, a reality based artista search, created by GMA Network. Gonzales became David Pomeranz's opening act for the latter's concert in Manila. Gonzales joined the Ginoong Laguna 2012 and won 2nd Runner Up.

He is known for his leading roles in Magkaagaw and Start-Up PH.

== Education and career ==
Gonzales was a nursing graduate from Calamba Doctors' College in Parian who has temporarily set aside taking the board exams to pursue a showbiz dream. Born and raised in Barangay Halang and was mentored by the Southern Luzon mentor Gina Alajar. Gonzales was originally a protégé of Alajar but due to a twist of the show, Alajar had to let go one of her protégés and mentor Jolina Magdangal chose Gonzales as her new protégé.

At the end of the competition, Gonzales was announced as the "Ultimate Male Protégé." Gonzales' female counterpart in winning the competition is Thea Tolentino who is also from Calamba.

Gonzales became part of the now defunct Sunday noontime variety show Party Pilipinas with the other top six finalists. Also after winning Protégé, Jeric was signed, with Thea Tolentino, to be part of Teen Gen, a sequel of the teen oriented show of the 1990s, T.G.I.S..

In 2013, Gonzales appeared as a guest in sitcom Pepito Manaloto. Gonzales was also part of the prime time telenovela, Love and Lies.

In 2014, Gonzales became part of the cast of Hustisya and in Nora Aunor's Dementia. The same year, Gonzales became a member of the musical trio 3LOGY with Abel Estanislao and Jak Roberto. Their first song is the revival of Jolina Magdangal's hit Maybe It's You.

In 2022, Gonzales, along with Alden Richards, Bea Alonzo, and Yasmien Kurdi joined the cast of the Philippine adaptation of Korean drama Start-Up, where he played the role of Davidson "Dave" Navarro. He considered it the biggest break in his career.

== Personal life ==
In 2019, Gonzales dated actress Klea Pineda. The former couple worked together in the drama series Ika-5 Utos.

He also dated former Miss Universe Philippines turned actress Rabiya Mateo. Gonzales and Mateo confirmed their relationship on March 16, 2022.

== Filmography ==
=== Television series ===
Year	Title	Role
2012–13	Teen Gen	Santiago "Tiago" Torres
2013	Love and Lies	Ryan Alcantara
2013	Pyra: Babaeng Apoy	Jeffrey Calida
2014	Paraiso Ko'y Ikaw	Edward (Young)
2014–15	Strawberry Lane	George Bustamante
2015	Pari 'Koy	Eli Marasigan
2015–16	Destiny Rose	Vince
2016	Once Again	Jared "JV" Sanchez
2016	Oh, My Mama!	Zach Ynares
2017	Trops	Richard Roxas
2017	Super Ma'am	Isagani Dagohoy
2017–18	Kambal, Karibal	Michael Roy "Makoy" Claveria
2018–19	Ika-5 Utos	Brix Lorenzo
2019–21	Magkaagaw	Jio Almonte
2021	Heartful Café	Warren
2022	Start-Up PH	Davidson "Dave" Navarro
2023	Mga Lihim ni Urduja	Greg Sandoval
2024	Widows' War	Francis Castillo

=== Anthologies ===
Year	Title	Role	Ref.
2013	Magpakailanman: Flowers of Hope: The Rolando Niangar Story	Rolando Niangar (Teen)	
2013	Maynila: Hate You, Love You	Mauro	
2013	Maynila: Recipe for Love	Elmo	
2014	Wagas: Lydia and Pongol Love Story	Pongol	
2015	Wagas: Lala and Ronnie Love Story	Ronnie	
2015	Magpakailanman: Ang Masuwerteng Pinay sa Brunei: The Kathelyn Dela Cruz Dupaya Story	Mar (Young)	
2015	Karelasyon: Kambal	TJ	
2015	Magpakailanman: Brother Na, Sister Pa: The Tubato Family Story	Christine Tubato	
2015	Alamat: Ang Mahiwagang Singsing	Pedro (Voice)	
2015	Wish Ko Lang	Jeremy	
2015	Magpakailanman: Asawa ni Mister, Kabit ni Misis	Junell	
2015	Karelasyon: Apartment	James	
2015	Maynila: YOLO si Lola	Moymoy	
2015	Maynila: Flowers 4 U	Alvin	
2015	Maynila: Mahal Nga Kasi Kita	Arlan	
2015	Magpakailanman: Bingit ng Buhay: The Skyway Bus Tragedy	Ryan	
2016	Magpakailanman: Multo Ni Ella	Elmer	
2016	Maynila: Lovely Revenge	Luigi	
2016	Magpakailanman: Pikot In Love	Alan	
2016	Dear Uge: I Love You, Mars!	Bong	
2016	Magpakailanman: Ang Hinagpis Ng Isang Ina	Hisham Go	
2016	Dear Uge: Paano Mapansin Ni Crush?	Rusty	
2016	Karelasyon: Rehas	Preso	
2017	Karelasyon: Valentines Day	Andy	
2017	Magpakailanman: Sweet Smell of Success: The Donita Nose Story	Ricky	
2017	Magpakailanman: May Forever: The Ariel Cruz and Julieta Manuel Story	Ariel (Young)	
2017	Daig Kayo ng Lola Ko: Echoserang Senyorita at ang Pabibong Frog	Fredrick	
2017	Imbestigador: Nanlaban o Pinatay?	Kian Loyd Delos Santos	
2017	AHA!: Monsterfest: Bal-bal	Baldo	
2017	Dear Uge: Saklolo, Saklola	Christian	
2018	Magpakailanman: My Life as a Poser: The Roxanne Cana Story	Jkarr	
2018	Wagas: Ang Pilat ni Galea	Eladio	
2018	Elehiya	Eric	
2018	Daig Kayo ng Lola Ko: Ibong Adarna	Don Juan	
2018	Magpakailanman: Our Crazy Love	Gerald	
2018	Dear Uge: Momshie & Me	Erica	
2018	Dear Uge: My Secret Love	Junie	
2018	Wagas: My Little Big Love	Jamhel	
2018	Maynila: Love Blends	Andy	
2019	Magpakailanman: Male Sex Slave sa Saudi	Jim	
2021	Regal Studio Presents: Bros B4 Rose	Vincent	

=== Various shows ===
Year	Title	Role
2012	Protégé: The Battle For The Big Artista Break	Himself / Grand Winner
2012–13	Party Pilipinas	Himself (performer)
2013	Pepito Manaloto: Ang Tunay na Kuwento	Ronnie Castro
2013–15	Sunday All Stars	Himself (performer)
2016	A1 Ko Sa 'Yo	Christian
2016–17	Tsuperhero	Danilo

=== Film ===
Year	Title	Role	Ref.
2014	Hustisya	Michael	
2014	Dementia	Vincent	
2016	Imagine You & Me	Rudy	
2019	Kiko en Lala	Spa Boy #3	
2022	Broken Blooms	Jeremy Gonzaga	
TBA	Graduation Day †		

== Discography ==
Singles
Year	Title	Featured artist(s)	Composer	Label	Notes	Ref.
2015	"Pwede Ba"	Jak Roberto and Abel Estanislao	Mikoy Morales	GMA Records	Local theme from Pinocchio	
2019	"Taksil"	N/A	Glen Mapue	GMA Music		
2020	"Line To Heaven"	N/A	Paco Arespacochaga	GMA Music	Originally performed by Introvoys	
2022	"Hihintayin Kita"	N/A	Louie Ignacio	GMA Music	Theme from Broken Blooms	

== Awards and nominations ==
Year	Association	Category	Nominated work	Result
2014	11th Golden Screen Awards	Outstanding Breakthrough Performance by an Actor	Teen Gen	Nominated
2015	31st PMPC Star Awards for Movies	New Movie Actor of the Year	Dementia	Nominated
2019	33rd PMPC Star Awards for Television	Best Single Performance by An Actor	Magpakailanman: Male Sex Slave sa Saudi	Won
2021	12th PMPC Star Awards for Music	Male Acoustic Artist of the Year	Taksil	Won
2022	17th Harlem International Film Festival	Best Actor	Broken Blooms	Won
2022	Mokkho International Film Festival	Critics Choice for Best Actor in an Indie	Broken Blooms	Won
2022	Saskatchewan International Film Festival	Best Actor (Full-Length Fiction)	Broken Blooms	Won
2022	Tagore International Film Festival	Outstanding Achievements for Best Actor	Broken Blooms	Won
