= Thea Tolentino =

Filipina actress

- Born: Thea Loise Señerez Tolentino; August 13, 1996 (age 30); Calamba, Laguna, Philippines
- Occupation: Actress
- Years active: 2012–present
- Agent: Sparkle GMA Artist Center (2012–present)

Thea Loise Señerez Tolentino (born August 13, 1996) is a Filipino actress known for her role as Ashley Mercado Alcantara in the GMA Network television drama The Half Sisters. She started her career as one of the winners of the second season of Protégé, a talent-search reality show created by GMA Network. Since then, she became a contract artist of GMA and began appearing on various dramas such as Anna Karenina, Pyra: Babaeng Apoy, Hahamakin ang Lahat and Asawa Ko, Karibal Ko. She also gained public attention for playing the villain sorcereress in Haplos (2017), which is her most villainous role up to date. Recently, she portrayed an evil mother in Madrasta (2019).

== Early life ==
Thea Loise Señerez Tolentino was born and raised in Calamba, Laguna, Philippines. Tolentino has two younger brothers, Terrence Louie and Tobbie. Prior to joining Protégé, she stated that she had never been separated from the family. Crazy Little Thing Called Love (2010) and Lie To Me (2011) are one of her favorite films and television series respectively.

== Career ==
Tolentino entered showbiz in 2012 as a contestant on the GMA Network's talent-search reality show Protégé: The Battle for the Big Artista Break. Mentored by Gina Alajar, Tolentino emerged as the female grand winner of the competition. She later starred in her first lead role in the fantasy-drama series Pyra: Ang Babaeng Apoy (2010). Tolentino became known for portraying antagonist roles in television series such as The Half Sisters (2014), Destined to Be Yours (2017), Haplos (2017–2018), Asawa Ko, Karibal Ko (2018–2019), Madrasta (2018–2019), and Las Hermanas. (2021–2022). She admitted that playing villains allows her greater creative freedom compared to heroine roles.

Tolentino began portraying antagonist roles in 2013 after initially playing kind haracters. She later realized that stronger and more assertive roles suited her acting style better, marking the start of her career as a television antagonist. Since then, Tolentino has consistently portrayed villain roles in television dramas and viewed typecasting as an opportunity to improve her craft by giving each character a distinct personality. She also shared that portraying antagonists contributed to her personal and professional growth, making her more confident and trusting of her abilities.

In Mano Po Legacy: The Flower Sisters (2022–2023), Tolentino took on a different role by portraying a kind and gentle character instead of a villain. She said the transition was challenging because she was more accustomed to intense kontrabida roles. During the early days of taping, she shared that she struggled to adjust to softer scenes and even joked that she was not used to acting overly kind. According to Tolentino, light and emotional scenes were more difficult for her than confrontational ones. In 2023, during her guest appearance on Fast Talk with Boy Abunda, Tolentino recalled joining Protégé unexpectedly while originally searching for an acting workshop with her mother. She also shared memorable experiences from The Half Sisters, including intense scenes with Jean Garcia.

== Personal life ==
Despite her acting career, Tolentino continued pursuing higher education at Trinity University of Asia, where she studied Business Administration major in Public Administration. Balancing academics and showbiz reflected her discipline and commitment beyond the entertainment industry. On June 20, 2020, Tolentino officially graduated from college. Due to the COVID-19 pandemic, the graduation ceremony was held online, and she received her diploma virtually alongside her fellow graduates.

Tolentino has been in a long-term relationship with non-showbiz partner Martin Joshua San Miguel. In October 2025, they celebrated their fourth anniversary. On November 25, 2025, San Miguel proposed to Tolentino during a trip abroad under Ginkgo trees. She publicly announced their engagement on Instagram on November 30, 2025, sharing photos from the proposal and introducing him as her fiancé.

== Filmography ==
=== Television ===
Year	Title	Role	Notes
2012	Protégé: The Battle for the Big Artista Break	Herself (contestant)	
2012–2013	Teen Gen	Angela "Angge" Parahinog	
2013	Love & Lies	Marissa Rivero	
2013	Anna Karenina	Anna Karenina "Angel" Dela Cruz	
2013	Maynila: Bad Boy, Good Heart	Rejji	
2013	Maynila: Moving On with Your Heart	Rica	
2013	Magpakailanman: Flowers of Hope - The Rolando Niagar Story	Teenage Sheryl	
2013	Pyra: Babaeng Apoy	Pyra Lucente / Pyra Del Fierro	
2014	Kambal Sirena	Gindara	
2014	Maynila: Love Promises	Melinda	
2014	Maynila: Luv U Still	Alyssa	
2014	Maynila: Misyon ng Puso	Morgan	
2014	Maynila: When Love Take a U-Turn	Jessica	
2014–2016	The Half Sisters	Ashley "Ash" M. Alcantara	418 episodes
2014	Maynila: Y.O.L.O (You Only Love Once)	Lyra	
2014	Maynila: My Sister's Lover	Jasmine	
2015	Maynila: My Rebel Heart	Trina	
2015	Magpakailanman: Ang Masuwerteng Pinay sa Brunei	Young Kathy	
2015	Maynila: Hugot Pa More!	Nicole	
2015	Love Hotline: Magpinsan... Makasalanan	Isabel Phajador	
2015	Maynila: Ganti ng Api	Ella	
2015	Wagas: Camille Prats and VJ Yambao Love Story	Camille Prats	
2016	Love Hotline: My Mystery Girl	Jen	
2016	Magpakailanman: The Rape Video Scandal	Ivy	
2016	Once Again	Celeste L. Carbonnel-Sanchez	
2016	Pepito Manaloto	Amanda "Mandy" Ramos	
2016	Wish Ko Lang: Mag-ate	Carmina	
2016	Maynila: Single Dad	Erin	
2016	Karelasyon: Mama Beth	Anna	
2016	Dear Uge: I Love You, Mars!	Samantha	
2016	Maynila: Karugtong ng Kahapon	Cherry	
2016	Magpakailanman: Fight for Love	Herself	
2016	Wish Ko Lang: Pangalawang Buhay	Mae	
2016–2017	Hahamakin ang Lahat	Phoebe Ke	
2016	Dear Uge: Paano Mapansin ni Crush?	Candy	
2016	Magpakailanman: May Forever sa Bahay Pag-ibig	Young Tess Suarez	
2017	Maynila: New Beginnings	Lana	
2017	Imbestigador: Nagbigti o Binigti?	Angelique Bulatao	
2017	Destined to be Yours	Patricia "Trish" Villanueva	
2017	Imbestigador: Cum Laude	Donna Pascual	
2017	Daig Kayo ng Lola Ko: The Adventures of Chuck the Tailor	Maya	
2017	Daig Kayo ng Lola Ko: Tatay Pitong at Pilyong Nokyo	Maya	
2017	Maynila: Love is Not Blind	Josefina Olorocisimo	
2017	Magpakailanman: May Forever - The Ariel Cruz and Julieta Manuel Story	Mila	
2017–2018	Haplos	Lucille Bermudez / Rosella "Sella"	
2018	Maynila: Tapsilove	Simang	
2018	Magpakailanman: Wife for Hire	Alma Bulawan	
2018	Elehiya	Regina	
2018	Dear Uge: Ang Sakit Pala Matanggihan!	Amy	
2018	Wish Ko Lang: Payaso	Joey	
2018	Inday Will Always Love You	Ruby	
2018	Maynila: My Girlfriend Is a Gangster	Grace	
2018	Stories for the Soul: The Better Sister	Shane	
2018	Dear Uge: Isang Takong, Isang Tanong	Loida Fernandez	
2018–2019	Asawa Ko, Karibal Ko	Venus Hermosa / Nathan Bravante / Catriona	
2019	Magpakailanman: Tatlong Henerasyon ng Sipag at Tiyaga	Teenage Cynthia Villar	
2019	Wish Ko Lang: Anak (A Reunion Story)	Luna	
2019	Imbestigador: Christine Silawan Murder Case	Christine Lee Silawan	
2019	Wish Ko Lang: Taxi Driver	Jenny	
2019	Maynila: Bad Mom	Paula	
2019	Magpakailanman: Yanig ng Buhay - The Pampanga Earthquake Victims Story	Lourdes "Des" Pinaglabanan	
2019	Dear Uge: It's Complicated!	Maru	
2019	Daig Kayo ng Lola Ko: Squad Goals	Fairy Mona	
2019	Daddy's Gurl	Caitlyn	
2019	Tadhana: Obsession	Karen	
2019–2020	Madrasta	Katharine Viduya-Ledesma / Kara Santos / Sylvia	
2019	Maynila: Unexpected Blessing	Carla	
2019	Dear Uge: Ayoko Ne Seyo	Jheng Landicho	
2020	Imbestigador: Abuso	Jocelyn Lopez	
2020	Magpakailanman: The Sign Language of Love	Beth Rivas	
2021	The Lost Recipe	Ginger Romano	
2021	Tadhana: Sa Ngalan ng Ama	Tracy	
2021–2022	Las Hermanas	Minerva "Minnie" Manansala	
2022	Lolong	Celia	
2022–2023	Mano Po Legacy: The Flower Sisters	Dahlia Morales Chua	
2023	Tadhana: Penintensya	Faith	
2023	Regal Studios Presents: Romy and Julie	Julie	
2023	Regal Studio Presents: Time Out	Gels	
2024	Makiling	Rosario "Rose" Lirio / Rose Terra	
2024	Wish Ko Lang!: Sayang na Ganda	Ruby	
2025	Binibining Marikit	Angela Torres- Caringal	
2025	Maka	Betty	
2026	Apoy sa Dugo	Atty. Trixie Mendoza	

=== Film ===
Year	Film	Role
2017	This Time I'll Be Sweeter	Kimberly
2021	Lost Stars Within Us	Danica
2023	The Cheating Game	Natalie

== Awards and nominations ==
Year	Association	Award giving body	Category	Result
2013	Philippine Movie and Television Press Club	27th PMPC Star Awards for Television	Best New Female TV Personality for Teen Gen	Nominated

Awards and achievements
Preceded by Krizza Neri	Protege (TV series); 2012 (season 2)	Succeeded by Incumbent
