= All-Star Videoke =

Philippine television game show

- Title card
- Genre: Game show
- Created by: Ma. Luisa Cadag
- Written by: Haydee Bellen; Yani Bautista
- Directed by: Louie Ignacio
- Presented by: Betong Sumaya; Solenn Heussaff
- Country of origin: Philippines
- Original language: Tagalog
- No. of episodes: 28

Production
- Production locations: GMA Network Center, Quezon City, Philippines
- Camera setup: Multiple-camera setup
- Running time: 45 minutes
- Production company: GMA Entertainment TV

Original release
- Network: GMA Network
- Release: September 3, 2017 – March 25, 2018

All-Star Videoke is a Philippine television karaoke game show broadcast by GMA Network. The show is a revival of the 2002 karaoke game show All-Star K!. Directed by Louie Ignacio, it hosted by Betong Sumaya and Solenn Heussaff. It premiered on September 3, 2017 on the network's Sunday Grande sa Gabi line up. The show concluded on March 25, 2018, with a total of 28 episodes.

== Hosts ==
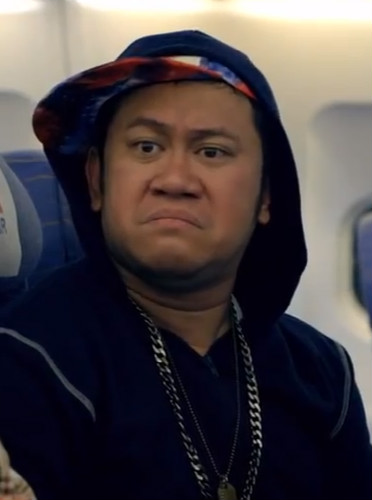
Betong Sumaya served as a host.

- Betong Sumaya
- Solenn Heussaff

Guest host

- Iya Villania (3 episodes)

Kalye-oke babe

- Arianne Bautista (2 episodes)

== Episodes ==
Color key

The defending champion completed 4 wins and won the brand new car.
The defending champion completed 4 wins only.

Episodes of All Star Videoke
No.	Original air date	All-star laglagers	Participants						Defending champion
No.	Original air date	All-star laglagers	1	2	3	4	5	6	Defending champion
1	September 3, 2017	Alden Richards; Jerald Napoles	Kim Domingo	Barbie Forteza	Ken Chan	Megan Young	Mikael Daez	Jak Roberto	Kim Domingo (1 week)
2	September 10, 2017	Sunshine Dizon; Angelika dela Cruz	Teri Onor	Boobsie Wonderland	Ate Velma	Divine Tetay Ocampo	Chuchie	Boobay	Boobay (4 weeks)
3	September 17, 2017	Julie Anne San Jose; Philip Lazaro	Derrick Monasterio	Sanya Lopez	Mark Herras	Valeen Montenegro	Sef Cadayona	Lovely Abella	Boobay (4 weeks)
4	September 24, 2017	Joey Paras; Gladys Guevarra	Divine Aucina	Rocco Nacino	Andre Paras	Thea Tolentino	Glaiza de Castro	Diego Llorico	Boobay (4 weeks)
5	October 1, 2017	Tina Paner; Sheryl Cruz	Denise Barbacena	Rodjun Cruz	Laylay De Lima (Kim Idol)	Kaladkaren Davila	Gardo Versoza	Matthias Rhoads	Boobay (4 weeks)
6	October 8, 2017	Christian Bautista; Atak Araña	Miguel Tanfelix	Rochelle Pangilinan	Bianca Umali	Arthur Solinap	Ryan Eigenmann	Kris Bernal	Miguel Tanfelix (4 weeks)
7	October 15, 2017	Super Tekla; Alexander Lee	Gabbi Garcia	Ivan Dorschner	Gil Cuerva	Osang	Francine Garcia	Bea Binene	Miguel Tanfelix (4 weeks)
8	October 22, 2017	Aicelle Santos; Pekto	Sheena Halili	Katrina Halili	Wilma Doesnt	Dion Ignacio	Mike Tan	Benjamin Alves	Miguel Tanfelix (4 weeks)
9	October 29, 2017	Barbie Forteza; Ken Chan	Chris Tsuper	Nicole Hyala	Roadfill	Papa Dudut	Joyce Pring	Adel Antada	Miguel Tanfelix (4 weeks)
10	November 5, 2017	Ate Velma; Teri Onor	Jason Francisco	Super Tekla	Jason Abalos	Pancho Magno	Jay Arcilla	Ate Shawie	Jason Francisco (1 week)
11	November 12, 2017	Divine Tetay; Kakai Bautista	Empress Schuck	Donita Nose	Aubrey Miles	Karel Marquez	Ate Reg	LJ Reyes	Empress Schuck (4 weeks)
12	November 19, 2017	Nar Cabico; Jennylyn Mercado	Migo Adecer	Vaness del Moral	Ayra Mariano	Kevin Santos	Rainier Castillo	Arra San Agustin	Empress Schuck (4 weeks)
13	November 26, 2017	Boobsie Wonderland; Kim Idol	Keempee de Leon	Kim Last	Patricia Tumulak	Sinon Loresca	Luane Dy	Taki Saito	Empress Schuck (4 weeks)
14	December 3, 2017	Jason Francisco; Donita Nose	Meg Imperial	Marco Gumabao	Matt Evans	Iya Manggagaya	Reese Tuazon	Dyosa Pockoh	Empress Schuck (4 weeks)
15	December 10, 2017	Boobay; Super Tekla	Maricris Garcia	Rita Daniela	Edgar Allan Guzman	Mr. Fu	Tuesday Vargas	Myke Solomon	Maricris Garcia (4 weeks)
16	December 17, 2017	Divine Tetay; Miguel Tanfelix	Janine Gutierrez	Chynna Ortaleza	Neil Ryan Sese	Geoff Eigenmann	Paolo Contis	Andrea Torres	Maricris Garcia (4 weeks)
17	January 7, 2018	Philip Lazaro; Arnel Ignacio	Andre Paras	Rodjun Cruz	Jason Abalos	Katrina Halili	Donita Nose	Kris Bernal	Maricris Garcia (4 weeks)
18	January 14, 2018	Iyah Minah; Jason Francisco	Maey Bautista	Juancho Trivino	Jake Vargas	Beki Belo	Klea Pineda	Kate Valdez	Maricris Garcia (4 weeks)
19	January 21, 2018	Michelle O'Bombshell; Divine Tetay	Ruru Madrid	Arci Muñoz	Martin del Rosario	Tammy Dionesia	Ashley Ortega	Ynna Asistio	Ruru Madrid (4 weeks)
20	January 28, 2018	Boobay; Pekto	Le Chazz	Jeric Gonzales	Sheree	Maui Taylor	Fabio Ide	Beki la Fea	Ruru Madrid (4 weeks)
21	February 4, 2018	Boobsie Wonderland; Atak Arana	Jason Francisco & Patricia Ysmael (Note: A member of the winning pair will compete against the defending champion in the Push & Sing Round. When a member loses this round, the pair was eliminated.)	Mikoy Morales & Mikee Quintos	Aubrey Miles & Troy Montero	Teri Onor & Ate Velma	Anton Diva & Ate Reg	Addy Raj & Sam YG	Ruru Madrid (4 weeks)
22	February 11, 2018	Donita Nose; Iyah Mina	Bobby Andrews & Angelu de Leon	Wilma Doesnt & Terry	Divine Aucina & Skelly	Gladys Reyes & Christopher Roxas	Mikael Daez & Megan Young	Rich Asuncion & Benjamin Mudie	Ruru Madrid (4 weeks)
23	February 18, 2018	Dingdong Dantes; Divine Tetay	John Feir & Chariz Solomon	Kyline Alcantara & Bianca Umali	Sanya Lopez & Thea Tolentino	Martin del Rosario & Mike Tan	Archie Alemania & Arny Ross	Ian Red & Pepita Smith	John Feir & Chariz Solomon (1 week)
24	February 25, 2018	Tita Melanie; Joey Beki	Luane Dy & Rochelle Pangilinan	Lovely Abella & Valeen Montenegro	Bruno Gabriel & Ayra Mariano	Sef Cadayona & Ervic Vijandre	Inday Garutay & IC Mendoza	Janna Dominguez & Mosang	Luane Dy & Rochelle Pangilinan (1 week)
25	March 4, 2018	Tom Rodriguez; Donita Nose	Ivan Dorschner & Mika Dela Cruz	Migo Adecer & Gil Cuerva	Mel Martinez & Arianne Bautista	Kate Valdez & Inah De Belen	Crissy & Nikki B	Benjamin Alves & Enrico Cuenca	Ivan Dorschner & Mika Dela Cruz (1 week)
26	March 11, 2018	Super Tekla; Adele	Rocco Nacino & Pancho Magno	Bea Binene & Kristofer Martin	Dave Bornea & Jay Arcilla	Nar Cabico & Analyn Barro	Hiro Peralta & Marika Sasaki	Martin D'Icon & Dax Martin	Rocco Nacino & Pancho Magno (1 week)
27	March 18, 2018	Marian Rivera; Jerald Napoles	Divine Tetay & Pepay	Sheena Halili & Katrina Halili	Mark Herras & Rainier Castillo	KC Montero & Troy Montero	Mart Escudero & Jan Manual	Mark Bautista & Kris Bernal	Divine Tetay & Pepay (1 week)
28	March 25, 2018 ("Battle of the Champions")	Ai-Ai Delas Alas	Ruru Madrid	Miguel Tanfelix	Boobay	Jason Francisco	Mika Dela Cruz	Maricris Garcia	Ruru Madrid (All Star Videoke Champion)

== Ratings ==
According to AGB Nielsen Philippines' Nationwide Urban Television Audience Measurement People in television homes, the pilot episode of All Star Videoke earned an 8.9% rating. The final episode scored a 7.4% rating.
