= Ken Chan (Filipino actor) =

Filipino actor, model and host (born 1993)

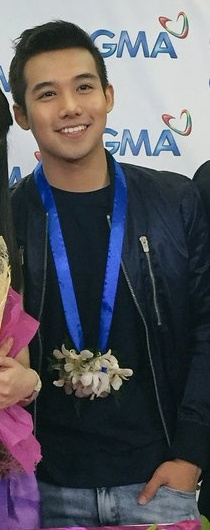
- Chan in November 2016
- Born: Ken Steven Angeles Chan; January 17, 1993 (age 33); Parañaque, Philippines
- Other names: Ken, Steven
- Citizenship: Philippines; China
- Occupations: Actor; singer; host; photographer; model; entrepreneur; Restaurateur
- Years active: 2011–2024
- Agent: Sparkle (2011–2024)
- Known for: Joey/Destiny, Yuan, Boyet, Grant, Nelson/Tyler/Major Alberto, Richard, Lyndon
- Height: 5 ft 8 in (173 cm)

Ken Steven Angeles Chan (Tagalog pronunciation: [ˈtʃan]; born January 17, 1993) is a Filipino-Chinese actor, singer, model, television presenter, host, vlogger, restaurateur and entrepreneur. Chan's showbiz career was established as a co-host and performer of German Moreno's Walang Tulugan with the Master Showman. He rose to fame through his role as Joey Vergara Jr. and Destiny Rose Flores-Antonioni in the award-winning TV-series Destiny Rose. In 2017, he again experienced a peak in his career as he starred in Meant to Be alongside Barbie Forteza, together with Jak Roberto, Ivan Dorschner, and Addy Raj. Chan is widely known for the portrayal of his character Boyet Villaroman, a young man with mild intellectual disability, alongside his loveteam partner Rita Daniela in the romantic-drama series My Special Tatay. He is also dubbed as "The Kapuso Ultimate Actor".

== Life and career ==
=== 1993–2010: Early life and career beginnings ===
Chan started having interest in theatre during his time in high school at Colegio San Agustin – Biñan.

He was taking up tourism at De La Salle–College of Saint Benilde when he joined show business in the first quarter of 2011. Chan's former manager (Rams David) discovered him. Prior to joining show business, Chan already did some television commercials and appeared in a youth magazine. He also took the Hotel and Restaurant Management course as he explicitly admit in Sarap Diva when he guested. He also mostly got his villain roles.

=== 2011–2016: Breakthrough ===
Chan was a host of the late night show, Walang Tulugan with the Master Showman with his colleagues Jake Vargas, Sanya Lopez, and Teejay Marquez. He already appeared in several shows of GMA Network in a span of one year. Chan appeared as part of the love triangle between Barbie Forteza and Joshua Dionisio's tandem in Tween Hearts.

Chan also portrayed a villain in Time of My Life as part of LJ Reyes group. he continues to share his talent in acting. He is paired with Yassi Pressman and sometimes, to Joyce Ching. Chan has a physical resemblance to his GMA namesake contract artist Steven Silva, who also has Chinese blood.

Chan gained fame in 2015 for playing the titular role of the novelist trans woman, Destiny Rose.

In 2017, he became the host of Day Off together with Janine Gutierrez.

=== 2017–2024: Career resurgence ===
Chan's fame has skyrocketed when he portrayed Yuan Lee in Meant to Be, Joshua Lazaro, a doctor in The Cure and Robert "Boyet" Mariano, a young man with mild intellectual disability, in My Special Tatay.

On January 8, 2019, he signed a recording contract with GMA Music.

He later reunites with his My Special Tatay leading lady, Rita Daniela in rom-com One of the Baes (2019), and Ang Dalawang Ikaw (2021), where he portrayed a man living with dissociative identity disorder named Nelson Sarmiento.

Chan also became the co-host of the singing competition The Clash from its second season until its fourth season, and is currently serving as one of the main hosts and performers in variety show All-Out Sundays.

In 2022, Chan portrayed the role of Richard Lim in Her Big Boss, the second installment of Mano Po Legacy. Later in 2023, Chan is reunited with My Special Tatay co-star Jillian Ward, as he joined Abot-Kamay na Pangarap, with portraying the role of Dr. Lyndon Javier.

== Business ==
Chan opened a first ever all-year-round Christmas-themed café called Café Claus in Tandang Sora, Quezon City on December 27, 2021, two days after the Christmas Day. The second branch at Promenade Greenhills opened in March 2022 with his business partners with Ryan Kolton and his brother Mark Chan as CEO and COO, respectively. It has several outlets in Luzon. In October 2024, Chan implemented a shutdown of Café Claus, which had three remaining branches due to insolvency.

In July 2024, Chan opened his 7th restaurant, "Deer Claus Steakhouse and Restaurant", on Timog Avenue, Quezon City, the second branch, while the first, in Balanga, and in Lipa, Batangas soon.

== Legal issues ==
Chan, along with seven others, is facing a syndicated estafa complaint in connection with an alleged investment dispute involving a restaurant business. The complaint was filed by a businessman, who claims to have invested ₱14 million in the venture. Authorities attempted to serve a second arrest warrant related to the case in November 2024, following the first warrant which was reportedly executed in September. The actor remains at large.

== Filmography ==
=== Film ===
Year	Title	Role	Notes	Ref.
2011	Tween Academy: Class of 2012	Justin		
2012	Just One Summer	Keith		
2012	My Kontrabida Girl	JC		
2016	Enteng Kabisote 10 and the Abangers	Allan/A1		
2016	Imagine You and Me	Bryan	Cameo role	
2017	This Time I'll Be Sweeter	Tristan		
2019	Kiko en Lala	Boyet	Special appearance (crossover character from My Special Tatay)	
2021	Huling Ulan sa Tag-Araw	Luis	Entry to Metro Manila Film Festival 2021	
2023	Papa Mascot	Nico	First solo role	

=== Television series ===
Year	Title	Role
2011	Time of My Life	Rudolf
2011–12	Tween Hearts	Mackenzie "Mac" Santos
2012	Biritera	Popoy
2012–13	Yesterday's Bride	Joel Ramirez
2013	Home Sweet Home	Dane
2014	Rhodora X	Ryan Ledesma
2015	The Rich Man's Daughter	young Angkong
2015	Healing Hearts	Anton
2015–16	Destiny Rose	Joselito "Joey" Vergara Jr. / Destiny Rose Flores-Antonioni
2017	Voltes V	Prince Zardoz (Voice Only)
2017	Yu-Gi-Oh! 5D's	Crow Hogan (Voice Only)
2017	Meant to Be	Yuan Lee
2018	The Cure	Joshua Lazaro
2018–19	My Special Tatay	Roberto "Boyet" M. Villaroman
2018–19	My Golden Life	Dion Choi (Voice Only)
2019–20	One of the Baes	Grant Altamirano
2019–20	Daddy's Gurl	Kuracho (Guest)
2021	Ang Dalawang Ikaw	Nelson Sarmiento / Tyler Franco / Maj. Dominiano "Major A" Alberto
2021	Regal Studio Presents	Jarvis Episode: "That Thin Line Between"
2021	Regal Studio Presents	Julius Episode: "Your House, My Home"
2022	Mano Po Legacy: Her Big Boss	Richard Lim
2023–24	Abot-Kamay na Pangarap	Dr. Lyndon Javier

=== Television shows ===
Year	Title	Role
2011–2016	Walang Tulugan with the Master Showman	Co-Host / Performer
2015	Maynila: Heart of Trust	Riel
2015	Maynila: Open Your Heart	Lance
2015	Magpakailanman: The Louise Delos Reyes Story	Jack
2015	Maynila: My Bespren, My Love	Beaver
2015	Maynila: Bad Boy Good Heart	Owen
2015	Maynila: Forget Me Not	Brent
2015	Maynila: Finding Mr.Right	Charles
2015	Maynila: Nobody's Princess	Jerry
2015	Maynila: Bilanggo ng Kahapon	Jerry
2016	Imbestigador: Nick Russel Oniot Murder Case	Nick Russel Oniot
2016	Maynila: Single Dad	Dale
2017	Imbestigador: Nurse Darrel Love Story, and Murder Case	Nurse Darrel de Claro
2017	Magpakailanman: Our Viral Love – Th Lance Fernandez and Ella Layer Story	Lance Fernandez
2018	Maynila: Magkapatid, Magkaribal	Blue
2019–2021	The Clash	Journey Host
2019	Magpakailanman: Never Give Up – The Ken Chan and Rita Daniela Story	Himself
2019	Studio 7	Co-host / Performer
2020–2024	All-Out Sundays	Main host / Performer
2020	Wowowin	Special guest / Performer
2022	Family Feud	Contestant
2022	TiktoClock	Guest / Player
2023	Magpakailanman: My 3rd Life – The Kim Atienza Story	Kim Atienza
2023	Magpakailanman: A Song For Daddy - The Anthony Rosaldo Story	Anthony Rosaldo
2024	It's Showtime	Guest / Performer

== Discography ==
=== Singles ===
Year	Title	Featured artist	Composer	Label	Note	Ref.
2019	Almusal	Rita Daniela	Dessirie Joy P. Cabalquinto (words) Noel Cabalquinto (music)	GMA Records		
2019	1 Like	N/A	Jimmy Borja (music) Eymard Altoveros (words)	GMA Music		
2019	Tayo ay Forever	Rita Daniela	Papa Obet	GMA Music	Barangay LS 97.1 theme song / jingle	
2022	Quaranfling	N/A	Lolito Go	GMA Music	Comeback single	

=== Albums ===
Year	Title	Tracks	Featured artists	Composer	Label	Notes	Ref.
2014	Self-titled	Dahil Ikaw	N/A	Marlon Silva	PolyEast Records	Originally performed by True Faith / Local theme song of I Hear Your Voice	
2014	Self-titled	Born for You	N/A	David Pomeranz	PolyEast Records	Originally performed by David Pomeranz	
2014	Self-titled	Paikot-Ikot	N/A	Kiko Salazar	PolyEast Records	His only original song in the album	
2014	Self-titled	Tulog Na	N/A	Ebe Dancel	PolyEast Records	Originally performed by Sugarfree	
2014	Self-titled	Nais Kong Malaman Mo	N/A	Joey Abando	PolyEast Records	Originally performed by Boyfriends / Local theme song of Fall in Love with Me	
2014	Self-titled	Sumayaw, Sumunod	N/A	Norman Caraan	PolyEast Records	Originally performed by Boyfriends	
2017	Meant to Be (Original Motion Picture Soundtrack)	Kahit Sino Pa Man	Barbie Forteza, Jak Roberto, Ivan Dorschner, and Addy Raj	Len Calvo	GMA Records	Main theme from Meant to Be	
2019	BoBrey (Live)	1 Like	N/A	Jimmy Borja (music) Eymard Altoveros (words)	GMA Music	Live tracks taken from My Special Love: #BoBreyinConcert	
2019	BoBrey (Live)	Almusal	Rita Daniela	Dessirie Joy P. Cabalquinto (words) Noel Cabalquinto (music)	GMA Music	Live tracks taken from My Special Love: #BoBreyinConcert	
2019	BoBrey (Live)	Kahit Anong Swerte Ko / Kahit Man Lang Sa Pangarap	Rita Daniela	Len Calvo (Kahit Anong Swerte Ko) / Vehnee Saturno (Kahit Man Lang Sa Pangarap)	GMA Music	Live tracks taken from My Special Love: #BoBreyinConcert	
2021	Ang Dalawang Ikaw (Original Soundtrack)	Makikinig Ako	N/A	Simon L. Tan	GMA Music / GMA Playlist	Secondary theme	
2021	Ang Dalawang Ikaw (Original Soundtrack)	Nandiyan Ka Pa Ba	Rita Daniela	Rina L. Mercado	GMA Music / GMA Playlist	Main theme (duet version)	

== Concerts ==
- My Destiny: Ken Chan Live in Concert (2016)
- My Special Love: #BoBreyinConcert (2019)

== Awards and nominations ==
Year	Award	Category	Nominated work	Result	Ref.
2014	62nd FAMAS Awards	German Moreno Youth Achievement Award	N/A	Won	
2016	2016 GMMSF Box-Office Entertainment Awards	Most Promising Male Star	Destiny Rose	Won	
2016	30th PMPC Star Awards for Television	Best Drama Actor	Destiny Rose	Nominated	
2016	3rd PEPList Awards	Editor's Choice: Teleserye Actor of the Year	Destiny Rose	Won	
2018	PMPC Star Awards for Television	Male Face of the Night	N/A	Won	
2019	1st Inside Showbiz Awards	Inside Showbiz Choice Performance	My Special Tatay	Won	
2019	17th Gawad Tanglaw	Best Lead Performance in a TV Series (with Rita Daniela)	My Special Tatay	Won	
2019	50th Box Office Entertainment Awards	TV Actor of the Year in a Daytime Drama Series	My Special Tatay	Won	
2019	33rd PMPC Star Awards for Television	German Moreno Power Tandem of the Year (with Rita Daniela)	My Special Tatay	Won	
2020	VP Choice Awards 2019	TV Actor of the Year	One of the Baes	Won	
2024	Philippine Finest Business Awards and Outstanding Achievers 2024	Outstanding Entrepreneur and Actor		Won	
