= Ang Dalawang Ikaw =

2021 Philippine television drama series

- Title card
- Also known as: The Other You
- Genre: Drama thriller
- Created by: Geng Delos Reyes-Delgado
- Written by: Lobert Villela; Geng Delos Reyes-Delgado; Jake Somera
- Directed by: Jorron Lee Monroy
- Creative director: Aloy Adlawan
- Starring: Ken Chan
- Country of origin: Philippines
- Original language: Tagalog
- No. of episodes: 60

Production
- Executive producer: Arlene Del Rosario-Pilapil
- Production locations: Bataan, Philippines; Tagaytay, Philippines
- Cinematography: David Siat
- Editor: Virgillo Custodio
- Camera setup: Multiple-camera setup
- Running time: 22–27 minutes
- Production company: GMA Entertainment Group

Original release
- Network: GMA Network
- Release: June 21 – September 10, 2021

Ang Dalawang Ikaw (transl. the two yous / international title: The Other You) is a 2021 Philippine television drama thriller series broadcast by GMA Network. Directed by Jorron Monroy, it stars Ken Chan in the title role. It premiered on June 21, 2021 on the network's Afternoon Prime line up. The series concluded on September 10, 2021, with a total of 60 episodes.

The series is streaming online on YouTube and iQIYI.

== Cast and characters ==
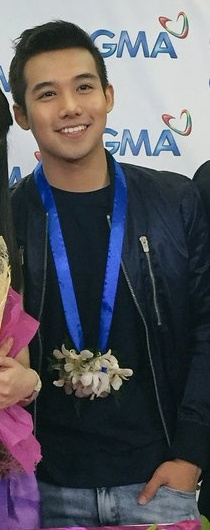
Ken Chan portrays the lead role.

Lead cast

- Ken Chan as Nelson Sarmiento / Tyler Franco / Dominiano Alberto

Supporting cast

- Rita Daniela as Mia Perez-Sarmiento
- Anna Vicente as Beatrice Illustre-Franco
- Jake Vargas as Lucas Javier
- Jhoana Marie Tan as Lani Delgado
- Lianne Valentin as Jo Escobar
- Jeremy Sabido as King Bautista
- Dominic Roco as Greg Perez
- Ricardo Cepeda as Ernesto Sarmiento
- Sharmaine Arnaiz as Belen
- Dindo Arroyo as Chavez
- Marco Alcaraz as Rex
- Ping Medina as Nicco
- Ollie Espino as Racal

Guest cast

- Adrian Carido as younger Nelson
- Ervic Vijandre as younger Ernesto
- Rosemarie Sarita as Leticia "Letty" Sarmiento
- Angela Alarcon as Chloe

== Production ==
Principal photography commenced in February 2021 in Tagaytay and Bataan. In March 2021, filming and the series premiere were postponed due to COVID-19 pandemic.

== Ratings ==
According to AGB Nielsen Philippines' Nationwide Urban Television Audience Measurement People in television homes, the pilot episode of Ang Dalawang Ikaw earned a 5.8% rating.

== Accolades ==
Accolades received by Ang Dalawang Ikaw
Year	Award	Category	Recipient	Result	Ref.
2023	35th PMPC Star Awards for Television	Best Daytime Drama Series	Ang Dalawang Ikaw	Nominated	
