= List of Meant to Be episodes =

Meant to Be is a 2017 Philippine television drama romantic comedy series broadcast by GMA Network. It aired from January 9, 2017 to June 23, 2017 on the network's Telebabad line-up replacing Someone to Watch Over Me.

NUTAM (Nationwide Urban Television Audience Measurement) People in Television Homes ratings are provided by AGB Nielsen Philippines.

== Series overview ==
Month	Episodes	Monthly averages
Month	Episodes	NUTAM
January 2017	17	8.1%
February 2017	20	7.8%
March 2017	23	8.2%
April 2017	18	8.5%
May 2017	23	8.0%
June 2017	17	7.5%

== Episodes ==
=== January 2017 ===
Episode		Original Air Date	Social Media Hashtag	AGB Nielsen NUTAM		
Episode		Original Air Date	Social Media Hashtag	Rating	Timeslot Rank	Ref.
1	Pilot	January 9, 2017	#MeantToBe	16.8%	#1	
2	Free Kiss Girl	January 10, 2017	#MTBFreeKissGirl	17.9%	#1	
3	Destined to Meet	January 11, 2017	#MTBDestinedToMeet	16.2%	#1	
4	Sorry Taken	January 12, 2017	#MTBSorryTaken	17.1%	#1	
5	Billie vs. the Boys	January 13, 2017	#MTBBillieVsTheBoys	18.0%	#1	
6	Free Kiss the Boys	January 16, 2017	#MTBFreeKissTheBoys	15.7%	#1	
7	Yes or No	January 17, 2017	#MTBYesOrNo	15.7%	#1	
8	La La Love	January 18, 2017	#MTBLaLaLove	16.3%	#1	
9	Bully Proof Billie	January 19, 2017	#MTBBullyProofBillie	16.2%	#1	
10	Ginalingan Masyado	January 20, 2017	#MTBGinalinganMasyado	16.6%	#1	
11	Madj Mahal Nang Tunay	January 23, 2017	#MTBMadjMahalNangTunay	16.3%	#1	
12	Awkward	January 24, 2017	#MTBAwkward	15.8%	#1	
13	May Nahuhulogloglog	January 25, 2017	#MTBMayNahuhulogloglog	16.4%	#1	
14	Come with Me	January 26, 2017	#MTBComeWithMe	15.2%	#1	
15	Taguan ng Feelings	January 27, 2017	#MTBTaguanNgFeelings	15.9%	#1	
16	Saluhin mo ko, Sir	January 30, 2017	#MTBSaluhinMoKoSir	14.5%	#1	
17	May nanalo na	January 31, 2017	#MTBMayNanaloNa	14.5%	#1	

=== February 2017 ===
Episode		Original Air Date	Social Media Hashtag	AGB Nielsen NUTAM		
Episode		Original Air Date	Social Media Hashtag	Rating	Timeslot Rank	Ref.
18	Hopiang Billie	February 1, 2017	#MTBHopiangBillie	15.0%	#1	
19	Ikaw na Perfect	February 2, 2017	#MTBIkawNaPerfect	15.6%	#1	
20	Kiss, Marry, Kill	February 3, 2017	#MTBKissMarryKill	16.3%	#1	
21	Kape, Asukal, Gatas, Pandesal	February 6, 2017	#MTBKapeAsukalGatasPandesal	15.1%	#1	
22	Change is Coming	February 7, 2017	#MTBChangeIsComing	15.3%	#1	
23	Fries and Sundae	February 8, 2017	#MTBFriesAndSundae	14.7%	#1	
24	Scars to Your Beautiful	February 9, 2017	#MTBScarsToYourBeautiful	14.3%	#2	
25	Mystery Texter	February 10, 2017	#MTBMysteryTexter	17.2%	#1	
26	Indian Love	February 13, 2017	#MTBIndianLove	15.8%	#1	
27	Happy Valentines Day	February 14, 2017	#MTBHappyValentinesDay	15.0%	#1	
28	Don't Let Me Down	February 15, 2017	#MTBDontLetMeDown	14.5%	#1	
29	Kahit Sino Basta Mahal Ko	February 16, 2017	#MTBKahitSinoBastaMahalKo	14.5%	#1	
30	Selos Starts Now	February 17, 2017	#MTBSelosStartsNow	15.3%	#1	
31	Sagutin Mo Na Ko	February 20, 2017	#MTBSagutinMoNaKo	15.8%	#1	
32	How Romantic	February 21, 2017	#MTBHowRomantic	16.4%	#1	
33	Beach Body Ready	February 22, 2017	#MTBBeachBodyReady	16.8%	#1	
34	Tinablan Ka Na Ba?	February 23, 2017	#MTBTinablanKaNaBa	16.4%	#1	
35	Gusto Kita	February 24, 2017	#MTBGustoKita	17.3%	#1	
36	Makuha ka sa Tingin	February 27, 2017	#MTBMakuhaKaSaTingin	15.9%	#1	
37	Elimination Round	February 28, 2017	#MTBEliminationRound	16.3%	#1	

=== March 2017 ===
Episode		Original Air Date	Social Media Hashtag	AGB Nielsen NUTAM		
Episode		Original Air Date	Social Media Hashtag	Rating	Timeslot Rank	Ref.
38	Perfect Boyfriend	March 1, 2017	#MTBPerfectBoyfriend	15.7%	#1	
39	Cocol at Kapal	March 2, 2017	#MTBCOCOLatKAPAL	15.8%	#1	
40	Dumadamoves	March 3, 2017	#MTBDumadamoves	16.6%	#1	
41	Group Date sa Brit Fair	March 6, 2017	#MTBGroupDateSaBritFair	15.8%	#1	
42	Pa-fall	March 7, 2017	#MTBPaFall	15.7%	#1	
43	Kaibigan o Kaibigan	March 8, 2017	#MTBKaibiganOKaibigan	15.9%	#1	
44	Pa-yumyum	March 9, 2017	#MTBPaYumYum	16.4%	#1	
45	Campi Tayo	March 10, 2017	#MTBCAMPITayo	16.8%	#1	
46	Two Truths and One Lie	March 13, 2017	#MTBTwoTruthsAndOneLie	—N/a		
47	Totes Into You	March 14, 2017	#MTBTotesIntoYou	—N/a		
48	Beauty and the Boys	March 15, 2017	#MTBBeautyAndTheBoys	—N/a		
49	Palakihan	March 16, 2017	#MTBPalakihan	—N/a		
50	May the Best Man Win	March 17, 2017	#MTBMayTheBestManWin	—N/a		
51	Daanin sa Bola	March 20, 2017	#MTBDaaninSaBola	—N/a		
52	It's Definitely On	March 21, 2017	#MTBItsDefinitelyOn	—N/a		
53	Friends o Girlfriend	March 22, 2017	#MTBFriendsOGirlfriend	—N/a		
54	You na Talaga, Billie	March 23, 2017	#MTBYouNaTalagaBillie	—N/a		
55	Anong Team Mo	March 24, 2017	#MTBAnongTeamMo	—N/a		
				AGB Nielsen NUTAM People		
56	Unang Holding Hands	March 27, 2017	#MTBUnangHoldingHands	7.7%	#1	
57	Aminan na	March 28, 2017	#MTBAminanNa	7.7%	#1	
58	Pwede nang Ligawan	March 29, 2017	#MTBPwedeNangLigawan	8.8%	#1	
59	Miss You Like Crazy	March 30, 2017	#MTBMissYouLikeCrazy	8.8%	#1	
60	Na-fall ang Pa-fall	March 31, 2017	#MTBNafallAngPafall	9.1%	#1	

=== April 2017 ===
Episode		Original Air Date	Social Media Hashtag	AGB Nielsen NUTAM People		
Episode		Original Air Date	Social Media Hashtag	Rating	Timeslot Rank	Ref.
61	After Shock	April 3, 2017	#MTBAfterShock	7.9%	#1	
62	Girl, Be Mine	April 4, 2017	#MTBGirlBeMine	8.7%	#1	
63	Official Akyat Ligaw	April 5, 2017	#MTBOfficialAkyatLigaw	9.3%	#1	
64	JEYA Moves	April 6, 2017	#MTBJEYAMoves	8.8%	#1	
65	What's Your Ship	April 7, 2017	#MTBWhatsYourShip	9.3%	#1	
66	Magpalakas tayo	April 10, 2017	#MTBMagpalakasTayo	9.4%	#1	
67	Patigasan	April 11, 2017	#MTBPatigasan	9.1%	#1	
68	One Day, One Ligaw	April 12, 2017	#MTBOneDayOneLigaw	8.9%	#1	
69	Pandesal at Kape	April 17, 2017	#MTBPandesalAtKape	7.7%	#1	
70	Kape at Gatas	April 18, 2017	#MTBKapeAtGatas	8.6%	#1	
71	Gatas at Asukal	April 19, 2017	#MTBGatasAtAsukal	8.4%	#1	
72	4 Reasons Why	April 20, 2017	#MTB4ReasonsWhy	8.9%	#1	
73	Pleasant Surprise	April 21, 2017	#MTBPleasantSurprise	7.7%	#1	
74	Shocking News	April 24, 2017	#MTBShockingNews	7.7%	#1	
75	Who's Your Daddy	April 25, 2017	#MTBWhosYourDaddy	8.6%	#1	
76	Fast and Furious 4	April 26, 2017	#MTBFastAndFurious4	8.1%	#1	
77	InstaDaddies	April 27, 2017	#MTBInstaDaddies	8.0%	#1	
78	My Baeby Bosses	April 28, 2017	#MTBMyBaebyBosses	8.1%	#1	

=== May 2017 ===
Episode		Original Air Date	Social Media Hashtag	AGB Nielsen NUTAM People		
Episode		Original Air Date	Social Media Hashtag	Rating	Timeslot Rank	Ref.
79	Labor Day Love	May 1, 2017	#MTBLaborDayLove	8.5%	#1	
80	Stars of the Show	May 2, 2017	#MTBStarsOfTheShow	8.0%	#1	
81	Billie Billie ng Pilipinas	May 3, 2017	#MTBBillieBillieNgPilipinas	8.3%	#1	
82	Pasabog na Balita	May 4, 2017	#MTBPasabogNaBalita	8.3%	#1	
83	Result is Out	May 5, 2017	#MTBResultIsOut	8.8%	#1	
84	Got Your Back	May 8, 2017	#MTBGotYourBack	7.9%	#1	
85	Fall for You	May 9, 2017	#MTBFallForYou	7.9%	#1	
86	Sinong may Pag-asa	May 10, 2017	#MTBSinongMayPagAsa	7.5%	#1	
87	Don't Judge Billie	May 11, 2017	#MTBDontJudgeBillie	7.8%	#1	
88	JEYA JEYA vs GAYA GAYA	May 12, 2017	#MTBJEYAJEYAvsGAYAGAYA	7.7%	#1	
89	JEYA GAYA Puto Maya	May 15, 2017	#MTBJEYAGAYAPutoMaya	7.7%	#1	
90	Round 2 Fight	May 16, 2017	#MTBRound2Fight	7.7%	#1	
91	Ligawan ng Paraan	May 17, 2017	#MTBLigawanNgParaan	7.5%	#1	
92	Jeron Teng	May 18, 2017	#JeronTengOnMTB	8.7%	#1	
93	Ang Pinili ni Billie	May 19, 2017	#MTBAngPiniliNiBillie	7.7%	#1	
94	Kapit ka sa Akin	May 22, 2017	#MTBKapitKaSaAkin	7.8%	#1	
95	I Love You	May 23, 2017	#MTBILoveYou	8.0%	#1	
96	Push Mo Yan	May 24, 2017	#MTBPushMoYan	8.3%	#1	
97	Wedding Hindi, Wedding Oo	May 25, 2017	#MTBWeddingHindiWeddingOo	8.2%	#1	
98	Pasabog ni Billie	May 26, 2017	#MTBPasabogNiBillie	8.7%	#1	
99	Ginalingan sa Panliligaw	May 29, 2017	#MTBGinalinganSaPanliligaw	7.9%	#1	
100	Pusuan Na Yan	May 30, 2017	#MTBPusuanNaYan	8.0%	#1	
101	1 Minute Pag-ibig	May 31, 2017	#MTB1MinutePagIbig	7.3%	#1	

=== June 2017 ===
Episode		Original Air Date	Social Media Hashtag	AGB Nielsen NUTAM People		
Episode		Original Air Date	Social Media Hashtag	Rating	Timeslot Rank	Ref.
102	Love Sick	June 1, 2017	#MTBLoveSick	8.8%	#1	
103	Kiligawan	June 2, 2017	#MTBKiligawan	8.7%	#1	
104	Last 15 Kiligs	June 5, 2017	#MTBLast15Kiligs	6.7%	#2	
105	I Dream of Billie	June 6, 2017	#MTBIDreamOfBillie	7.1%	#1	
106	We Met, Fought, Fell in Love	June 7, 2017	#MTBWeMetFoughtFellInLove	6.4%	#1	
107	Panda Love	June 8, 2017	#MTBPandaLove	7.0%	#1	
108	Singa-Four for Billie	June 9, 2017	#MTBSingaFourForBillie	7.5%	#1	
109	Kalayaang Magmahal in SG	June 12, 2017	#MTBKalayaangMagmahalInSG	7.3%	#1	
110	From SG with Love	June 13, 2017	#MTBFromSGWithLove	6.6%	#1	
111	Let's G sa SG	June 14, 2017	#MTBLetsGSaSG	6.4%	#1	
112	SG Spy with My Little Eyes	June 15, 2017	#MTBSGSpyWithMyLittleEyes	6.7%	#2	
113	SG Map to Your Heart	June 16, 2017	#MTBSGMapToYourHeart	7.4%	#2	
114	Muling Ibalik ang Pag-ibig	June 19, 2017	#MTBMulingIbalikAngPagIbig	7.2%	#1	
115	May Napili na Ako	June 20, 2017	#MTBMayNapiliNaAko	7.6%	#1	
116	143 Billie	June 21, 2017	#MTB143Billie	7.4%	#1	
117	Akin ka na Lang	June 22, 2017	#MTBAkinKaNaLang	8.2%	#1	
118	You and Me: The Kilig Finale	June 23, 2017	#MTBYouAndMeTheKiligFinale	10.3%	#1	
