= Sirkus (TV series) =

2018 Philippine television drama series

- Title card
- Genre: Fantasy drama
- Created by: Angeli Atienza
- Written by: Zig Dulay; Michael Christian Cardoz; Carlo Obispo; Marianne Mickaela Villalon
- Directed by: Zig Dulay
- Starring: Mikoy Morales; Mikee Quintos
- Ending theme: "Kung Ika'y Maniwala" by Julie Anne San Jose
- Country of origin: Philippines
- Original language: Tagalog
- No. of episodes: 13

Production
- Executive producer: Kristian Julao
- Cinematography: Joseph Delos Reyes
- Editors: Jhoan Antenor; Kris Campanilla; Tricia Señir
- Camera setup: Multiple-camera setup
- Running time: 30–34 minutes
- Production company: GMA News and Public Affairs

Original release
- Network: GMA Network
- Release: January 21 – April 15, 2018

Sirkus (transl. circus) is a 2018 Philippine television drama fantasy series broadcast by GMA Network. Directed by Zig Dulay, it stars Mikoy Morales and Mikee Quintos. It premiered on January 21, 2018 on the network's Sunday Grande sa Gabi line up. The series concluded on April 15, 2018, with a total of 13 episodes.

The series is streaming online on YouTube.

== Premise ==
Miko and Mia, ran away with a travelling circus to escape a person who is after them. After their parents disappeared, they rely on the protection of a group of circus performers that include a magician, a fire-breather, an acrobat, a strongman, and a clairvoyant. They will discover that their new circus family is a group of magical folk in disguise. The circus becomes key to revealing the truth about their identities, as they will eventually discover that they have their own powers.

== Cast and characters ==
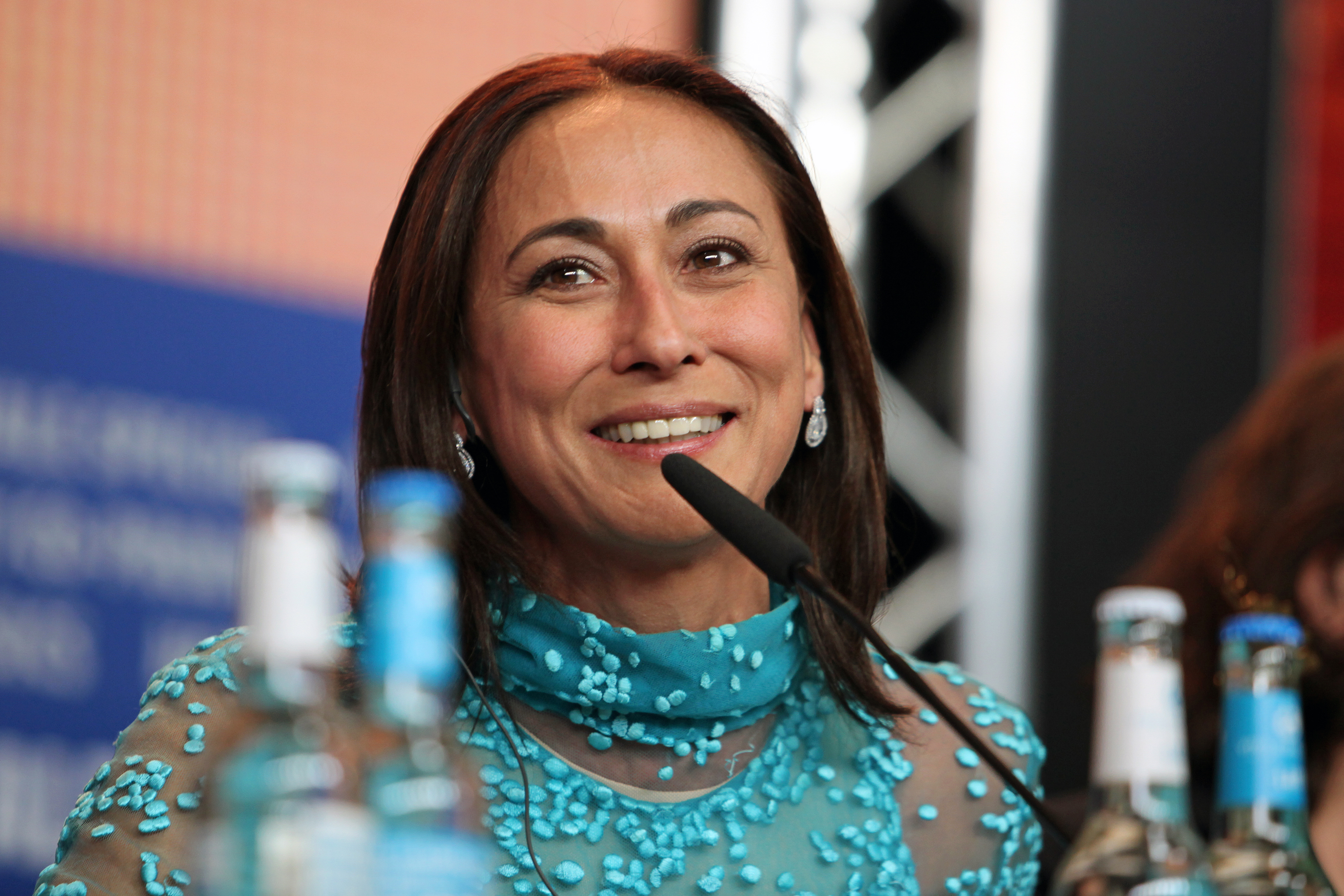
Cherie Gil portrays Lara.

Lead cast

- Mikoy Morales as Miko
- Mikee Quintos as Mia

Supporting cast

- Cherie Gil as Lara "La Ora"
- Gardo Versoza as Leviticus "Levi"
- Andre Paras as Martel
- Sef Cadayona as Al
- Chariz Solomon as Astra
- Klea Pineda as Sefira
- Divine Tetay as Luca
- Gerry Acao as Facundo

Guest cast

- Angelu de Leon as Liza
- Zoren Legaspi as Miguel
- Gina Alajar as Waya
- Noel Trinidad as Lolo
- Erlinda Villalobos as Lola
- David Remo as younger Levi
- Barbara Miguel as younger Lara
- Addy Raj as Sandino
- Lou Veloso as Nuno Ben
- Elizabeth Oropesa as Victorina
- Sue Prado as Nemila
- Bruce Roeland as Magsino
- Ashley Ortega as Lila
- Fanny Serrano as Veritas

== Ratings ==
Sirkus ratings
No.	AGB Nielsen NUTAM People in television homes	Original release date
1	8.6%	January 21, 2018
2	8.7%	January 28, 2018
3	7.8%	February 4, 2018
4	7.2%	February 11, 2018
5	6.3%	February 18, 2018
6	6.4%	February 25, 2018
7	5.4%	March 4, 2018
8	5.8%	March 11, 2018
9	5.3%	March 18, 2018
10	TBA	March 25, 2018
11	TBA	April 1, 2018
12	TBA	April 8, 2018
13	TBA	April 15, 2018

== Accolades ==
Accolades received by Sirkus
Year	Award	Category	Recipient	Result	Ref.
2018	32nd PMPC Star Awards for Television	Best Horror/Fantasy Program	Sirkus	Nominated	
