= List of Super Ma'am episodes =

Super Ma'am (International title: My Teacher, My Hero) is a 2017 Philippine television action fantasy drama series directed by Lord Alvin Madridejos and Albert Langitan. Starring Marian Rivera, this series premiered on GMA Network's GMA Telebabad evening block and worldwide on GMA Pinoy TV on September 18, 2017, replacing Mulawin vs. Ravena and occupying the timeslot of Alyas Robin Hood.

NUTAM (Nationwide Urban Television Audience Measurement) People in Television Homes ratings are provided by AGB Nielsen Philippines while Kantar Media Philippines provide Nationwide ratings (Urban + Rural).

The series ended its 19-week run with 95 episodes. It was replaced by Sherlock Jr. in its timeslot.

== Series overview ==
Month	Episodes	Monthly averages	
Month	Episodes	NUTAM	Nationwide
September 2017	10	9.8%	17.9%
October 2017	22	9.8%	17.6%
November 2017	22	10.4%	18.0%
December 2017	21	9.3%	17.2%
January 2018	20	10.0%	18.5%
Total	95	9.9%	17.8%

== Episodes ==
=== September 2017 ===
Episode		Original air date	Social media hashtag	AGB Nielsen NUTAM People in Television Homes			Kantar Media Nationwide			Ref.
Episode		Original air date	Social media hashtag	Rating	Timeslot rank	Whole day rank	Rating	Timeslot rank	Whole day rank	Ref.
1	"Pilot"	September 18, 2017	#SuperMaam	9.5%	#2	#5	18.7%	#2	#6	
2	"Super Maam Tamawo"	September 19, 2017	#SuperMaamTamawo	—N/a			17.9%	#2	#8	
3	"Manunggal Jar"	September 20, 2017	#SuperMaamManunggalJar	—N/a			17.8%	#2	#7	
4	"Minerva vs. Jessica"	September 21, 2017	#SuperMaamMinervaVsJessica	9.7%	#2	#5	17.3%	#2	#10	
5	"Kagat ng Tamawo" (Tamawo's Bite)	September 22, 2017	#SuperMaamKagatNgTamawo	9.7%	#2	#5	17.5%	#2	#8	
6	"Lihim ni Minerva" (Secret of Minerva)	September 25, 2017	#SuperMaamLihimNiMinerva	9.8%	#2	#5	16.8%	#2	#10	
7	"Minerva Version 2"	September 26, 2017	#SuperMaamMinervaVersion2	10.5%	#2	#4	19.0%	#2	#7	
8	"Ceres"	September 27, 2017	#SuperMaamCeres	9.8%	#2	#4	17.7%	#2	#7	
9	"Tamawo Slayer"	September 28, 2017	#SuperMaamTamawoSlayer	9.8%	#2	#3	17.2%	#2	#8	
10	"Challenge Accepted"	September 29, 2017	#SuperMaamChallengeAccepted	9.8%	#2	#3	18.7%	#2	#7	

=== October 2017 ===
Episode		Original air date	Social media hashtag	AGB Nielsen NUTAM People in Television Homes			Kantar Media Nationwide			Ref.
Episode		Original air date	Social media hashtag	Rating	Timeslot rank	Whole day rank	Rating	Timeslot rank	Whole day rank	Ref.
11	"Unang Laban" (First fight)	October 2, 2017	#SuperMaamUnangLaban	10.3%	#2	#3	17.7%	#2	#7	
12	"Avenir"	October 3, 2017	#SuperMaamAvenir	9.6%	#2	#5	18.0%	#2	#8	
13	"Paghaharap" (Confrontation)	October 4, 2017	#SuperMaamPaghaharap	9.3%	#2	#4	18.4%	#2	#7	
14	"Guilty"	October 5, 2017	#SuperMaamGuilty	9.7%	#2	#5	17.9%	#2	#6	
15	"Alerto" (Alert)	October 6, 2017	#SuperMaamAlerto	9.2%	#2	#5	17.7%	#2	#7	
16	"Resbak" (Back-up)	October 9, 2017	#SuperMaamResbak	10.7%	#2	#5	18.9%	#2	#6	
17	"Babala" (Warning)	October 10, 2017	#SuperMaamBabala	9.4%	#2	#5	19.0%	#2	#6	
18	"Walang Atrasan" (No turning back)	October 11, 2017	#SuperMaamWalangAtrasan	9.5%	#2	#4	18.7%	#2	#6	
19	"Pagsagip" (Rescue)	October 12, 2017	#SuperMaamPagsagip	10.0%	#2	#4	18.6%	#2	#6	
20	"Goodbye Ceres"	October 13, 2017	#SuperMaamGoodbyeCeres	10.0%	#2	#5	16.8%	#2	#10	
21	"Pagbubunyag" (Revelation)	October 16, 2017	#SuperMaamPagbubunyag	10.9%	#2	#2	17.7%	#2	#8	
22	"Unang Sakras" (First Sakras)	October 17, 2017	#SuperMaamUnangSakras	10.7%	#2	#3	18.2%	#2	#8	
23	"Pagbawi" (Recovery)	October 18, 2017	#SuperMaamPagbawi	9.6%	#2	#4	16.7%	#2	#9	
24	"Super Punch"	October 19, 2017	#SuperMaamSuperPunch	9.9%	#2	#4	17.4%	#2	#8	
25	"Isko Dagohoy"	October 20, 2017	#SuperMaamIskoDagohoy	8.9%	#2	#5	15.4%	#2	#11	
26	"Wake Up, Minerva"	October 23, 2017	#SuperMaamWakeUpMinerva	10.1%	#2	#5	17.3%	#2	#9	
27	"Back in Action"	October 24, 2017	#SuperMaamBackInAction	10.2%	#2	#5	17.6%	#2	#9	
28	"Simbolo" (Symbol)	October 25, 2017	#SuperMaamSimbolo	9.1%	#2	#5	16.4%	#2	#9	
29	"Rebelasyon" (Revelation)	October 26, 2017	#SuperMaamRebelasyon	10.9%	#2	#4	18.2%	#2	#9	
30	"Pangalawang Sakras" (Second Sakras)	October 27, 2017	#SuperMaamPangalawangSakras	8.0%	#2	#7	14.8%	#2	#12	
31	"Level Up"	October 30, 2017	#SuperMaamLevelUp	9.9%	#2	#5	16.8%	#2	#10	
32	"Baraka"	October 31, 2017	#SuperMaamBaraka	9.5%	#2	#4	18.7%	#2	#8	

=== November 2017 ===
Episode		Original air date	Social media hashtag	AGB Nielsen NUTAM People in Television Homes			Kantar Media Nationwide			Ref.
Episode		Original air date	Social media hashtag	Rating	Timeslot rank	Whole day rank	Rating	Timeslot rank	Whole day rank	Ref.
33	"Petmalu" (Impressive)	November 1, 2017	#SuperMaamPetmalu	9.0%	#2	#5	17.4%	#2	#7	
34	"Bagong Gerero" (New Warrior)	November 2, 2017	#SuperMaamBagongGerero	10.6%	#2	#4	19.2%	#2	#6	
35	"Tamawo Attack"	November 3, 2017	#SuperMaamTamawoAttack	10.7%	#2	#4	17.4%	#2	#8	
36	"Good vs Evil"	November 6, 2017	#SuperMaamGoodVsEvil	10.9%	#2	#4	18.5%	#2	#7	
37	"Rescue"	November 7, 2017	#SuperMaamRescue	10.3%	#2	#5	17.0%	#2	#10	
38	"Ikatlong Sakras" (Third Sakras)	November 8, 2017	#SuperMaamIkatlongSakras	10.0%	#2	#5	18.2%	#2	#8	
39	"Super Ma'am vs. Baraka"	November 9, 2017	#SuperMaamVsBaraka	10.7%	#2	#5	18.4%	#2	#8	
40	"Half Sisters"	November 10, 2017	#SuperMaamHalfSisters	10.5%	#2	#4	17.9%	#2	#8	
41	"Panganib" (Danger)	November 13, 2017	#SuperMaamPanganib	10.6%	#2	#5	17.4%	#2	#9	
42	"Avenir Reborn"	November 14, 2017	#SuperMaamAvenirReborn	10.6%	#2	#3	18.3%	#2	#7	
43	"Maling Akala" (Illusion)	November 15, 2017	#SuperMaamMalingAkala	10.6%	#2	#4	17.2%	#2	#8	
44	"Ikaapat na Sakras" (Fourth Sakras)	November 16, 2017	#SuperMaamIkaapatNaSakras	9.7%	#2	#5	17.6%	#2	#10	
45	"Huli Ka" (I Caught You)	November 17, 2017	#SuperMaamHuliKa	10.5%	#2	#3	16.8%	#2	#10	
46	"Super Ma'am vs. Manananggays"	November 20, 2017	#SuperMaamVsManananggays	10.1%	#2	#4	17.7%	#2	#8	
47	"Jack n' Jill"	November 21, 2017	#SuperMaamJackNJill	10.4%	#2	#4	17.2%	#2	#10	
48	"Ganti" (Revenge)	November 22, 2017	#SuperMaamGanti	9.7%	#2	#5	18.1%	#2	#7	
49	"Sumpa" (Curse)	November 23, 2017	#SuperMaamSumpa	10.5%	#2	#3	20.0%	#2	#6	
50	"Lunas" (Remedy)	November 24, 2017	#SuperMaamLunas	11.1%	#2	#2	17.9%	#2	#7	
51	"Engkanto" (Fairy)	November 27, 2017	#SuperMaamEngkanto	11.0%	#2	#2	17.4%	#2	#11	
52	"Bagat"	November 28, 2017	#SuperMaamBagat	10.4%	#2	#4	18.9%	#2	#6	
53	"Deliryo" (Delirious)	November 29, 2017	#SuperMaamDeliryo	10.5%	#2	#3	18.0%	#2	#7	
54	"Super Ma'am Saves Katitay"	November 30, 2017	#SuperMaamSavesKatitay	10.8%	#2	#4	19.0%	#2	#7	

=== December 2017 ===
Episode		Original air date	Social media hashtag	AGB Nielsen NUTAM People in Television Homes			Kantar Media Nationwide			Ref.
Episode		Original air date	Social media hashtag	Rating	Timeslot rank	Whole day rank	Rating	Timeslot rank	Whole day rank	Ref.
55	"Pagligtas" (Rescue)	December 1, 2017	#SuperMaamPagligtas	9.8%	#2	#3	18.5%	#2	#7	
56	"Tiyanak" (Goblin)	December 4, 2017	#SuperMaamTiyanak	10.1%	#2	#4	17.5%	#2	#8	
57	"Jessica's Baby"	December 5, 2017	#SuperMaamJessicasBaby	10.0%	#2	#4	18.4%	#2	#7	
58	"Spirit of Christmas"	December 6, 2017	#SuperMaamSpiritOfChristmas	10.9%	#2	#3	19.6%	#2	#7	
59	"Galit" (Anger)	December 7, 2017	#SuperMaamGalit	10.2%	#2	#4	18.3%	#2	#6	
60	"Raquel"	December 8, 2017	#SuperMaamRaquel	10.0%	#2	#4	16.7%	#2	#8	
61	"Mukha" (Appearance)	December 11, 2017	#SuperMaamMukha	9.5%	#2	#5	18.1%	#2	#7	
62	"Inay" (Mother)	December 12, 2017	#SuperMaamInay	9.6%	#2	#4	17.8%	#2	#8	
63	"Balat Kayo" (Disguise)	December 13, 2017	#SuperMaamBalatKayo	9.2%	#2	#4	17.4%	#2	#8	
64	"Duda" (Doubt)	December 14, 2017	#SuperMaamDuda	9.3%	#2	#5	17.3%	#2	#9	
65	"Clue"	December 15, 2017	#SuperMaamClue	8.5%	#2	#5	16.1%	#2	#10	
66	"Pangitain" (Vision)	December 18, 2017	#SuperMaamPangitain	9.5%	#2	#4	18.1%	#2	#7	
67	"Super Ma'am vs. Greta"	December 19, 2017	#SuperMaamVsGreta	9.5%	#2	#5	16.8%	#2	#8	
68	"Buko" (Secret Reveal)	December 20, 2017	#SuperMaamBuko	8.8%	#2	#4	16.8%	#2	#8	
69	"Winner"	December 21, 2017	#SuperMaamWinner	8.8%	#2	#5	17.5%	#2	#7	
70	"Michelle"	December 22, 2017	#SuperMaamMichelle	9.1%	#2	#5	16.3%	#2	#8	
71	"Deadly Bite"	December 25, 2017	#SuperMaamDeadlyBite	7.1%	#2	#4	14.3%	#2	#7	
72	"Evil Arises"	December 26, 2017	#SuperMaamEvilArises	8.2%	#2	#5	16.1%	#2	#10	
73	"Super Ma'am is Back"	December 27, 2017	#SuperMaamIsBack	8.7%	#2	#5	15.9%	#2	#11	
74	"Zombies"	December 28, 2017	#SuperMaamZombies	9.0%	#2	#5	16.7%	#2	#8	
75	"Zombies Rule"	December 29, 2017	#SuperMaamZombiesRule	9.0%	#2	#3	16.7%	#2	#7	

=== January 2018 ===
Episode		Original air date	Social media hashtag	AGB Nielsen NUTAM People in Television Homes			Kantar Media Nationwide			Ref.
Episode		Original air date	Social media hashtag	Rating	Timeslot rank	Whole day rank	Rating	Timeslot rank	Whole day rank	Ref.
76	"Zombie Ex"	January 1, 2018	#SuperMaamZombieEx	8.9%	#2	#3	16.2%	#2	#7	
77	"Wild Zombies"	January 2, 2018	#SuperMaamWildZombies	9.7%	#2	#3	18.3%	#2	#6	
78	"Evil Super Ma'am"	January 3, 2018	#EvilSuperMaam	9.8%	#2	#4	19.2%	#2	#7	
79	"Bagong Lodi" (New Idol)	January 4, 2018	#SuperMaamBagongLodi	10.4%	#2	#3	19.2%	#2	#6	
80	"Fake"	January 5, 2018	#SuperMaamFake	9.2%	#2	#4	18.2%	#2	#7	
81	"Welcome Back Super Ma'am"	January 8, 2018	#WelcomeBackSuperMaam	10.6%	#2	#3	18.9%	#2		
82	"Ang Dalawang Super Ma'am" (The Two Super Ma'ams)	January 9, 2018	#AngDalawangSuperMaam	10.0%	#2	#3	19.1%	#2	#5	
83	"Tactic"	January 10, 2018	#SuperMaamTactic	9.3%	#2	#2	18.5%	#2	#6	
84	"Barbie as Pearly"	January 11, 2018	#SuperMaamBarbieAsPearly	9.5%	#2	#5	18.9%	#2	#8	
85	"Ugkoy"	January 12, 2018	#SuperMaamUgkoy	9.5%	#2	#4	17.9%	#2	#11	
86	"Something Fishy"	January 15, 2018	#SuperMaamSomethingFishy	10.2%	#2	#4	18.9%	#2	#6	
87	"Secret Enemy"	January 16, 2018	#SuperMaamSecretEnemy	11.0%	#2	#2	18.2%	#2	#9	
88	"Alay" (Offer)	January 17, 2018	#SuperMaamAlay	9.7%	#2	#2	18.6%	#2	#8	
89	"DNA Test"	January 18, 2018	#SuperMaamDNATest	10.6%	#2	#3	19.0%	#2	#8	
90	"Snake Sisters"	January 19, 2018	#SuperMaamSnakeSisters	9.3%	#2	#4	17.1%	#2	#9	
91	"Bagsik" (Fierceness)	January 22, 2018	#SuperMaamBagsik	10.1%	#2	#2	18.4%	#2	#9	
92	"Love Lost"	January 23, 2018	#SuperMaamLoveLost	10.6%	#2	#2	18.6%	#2	#8	
93	"Digmaan" (War)	January 24, 2018	#SuperMaamDigmaan	9.9%	#2	#2	18.7%	#2	#9	
94	"Agalon"	January 25, 2018	#SuperMaamAgalon	10.0%	#2	#3	18.4%	#2	#8	
95	"Fantastic Finale"	January 26, 2018	#SuperMaamFantasticFinale	10.7%	#2	#2	19.3%	#2	#6	
