= One of the Baes =

Philippine television drama series

- Title card
- Also known as: My Crown Princess
- Genre: Drama; Romantic comedy
- Written by: Volta Delos Santos; Abet Pagdanganan Raz; Lester Malabanan; Aya Anunciacion; Janina Acosta; Anthony Rodulfo
- Directed by: King Mark Baco; Michael Christian Cardoz
- Starring: Ken Chan; Rita Daniela
- Theme music composer: Vehnee Saturno
- Opening theme: "Kaba" by Ken Chan and Rita Daniela
- Country of origin: Philippines
- Original language: Tagalog
- No. of episodes: 90 (list of episodes)

Production
- Executive producers: David Alayon Ramos Jr.; Jaypril Bautista Jaring
- Editors: Piah Luna; Norman Jasm Cuala
- Camera setup: Multiple-camera setup
- Running time: 26–39 minutes
- Production company: GMA News and Public Affairs

Original release
- Network: GMA Network
- Release: September 30, 2019 – January 31, 2020

One of the Baes (international title: My Crown Princess) is a Philippine television drama romance comedy series broadcast by GMA Network. Directed by King Mark Baco and Michael Christian Cardoz, it stars Ken Chan in the title role and Rita Daniela. It premiered on September 30, 2019 on the network's Telebabad line up. The series concluded on January 31, 2020, with a total of 90 episodes.

The series is streaming online on YouTube.

== Premise ==
Jowalyn Biglangdapa is willing to do anything to become a ship captain including sidelining her love life. One day, she will meet Grant Altamirano, whom will find out that Jowalyn is the one he's looking for.

== Cast and characters ==
Lead cast

- Ken Chan as Grant Altamirano
- Rita Daniela as Jowalyn "Jowa" Biglangdapa / Princess Aragoza

Supporting cast

- Roderick Paulate as Paps Fernando Biglangdapa / Victoria
- Amy Austria as Josephine "Jo" Rubio / Josephine De La Cruz-Aragoza
- Melanie Marquez as Alona Aragoza
- Tonton Gutierrez as Francis Aragoza
- Jestoni Alarcon as Steve Altamirano
- Archie Alemania as Efren "Bagets" Reynes
- Kenneth Medrano as Gary Balencia
- James Teng as Amador "Amay" Amador
- Edgar Allan Guzman as Charles Altamirano
- Rodjun Cruz as Martin Rivera
- Joyce Ching as Xtina Aguilar
- Maureen Larrazabal as Carmina Rivera-Biglangdapa
- Buboy Villar as Okoy McCormick
- Jelai Andres as Dorina "Dorie" Quirino
- Mahal as Floribeth Higantes
- Dyosa Pockoh as Dyosa
- Inday Garutay as Inday
- Joel Palencia as Manalo
- Renz Lagria as Atienza

Guest cast

- Elle Ramirez as younger Jo
- Joemarie Nielsen as younger Francis
- Pauline Mendoza as Kimmy Santisimo
- Lovely Abella as a mad woman
- Gene Padilla as Commandant
- Andre Paras as New Tenant
- Manel Sevidal as Ketchup Girl
- Carlos Agassi as Carpenter
- Odette Khan as Adoracion "Ador" Santisimo
- Wilma Doesnt as Rosalinda
- Yasser Marta as younger Steve
- Dani Porter as Bridgette Montenegro
- Addy Raj as Carlos Falcon
- Ruby Rodriguez as Madel Mendoza
- Lexi Gonzales as Izza Mendoza
- Michelle Dee as younger Alona
- Euwenn Aleta as Jun-Jun
- Rez Cortez as Rolando Salazar
- Archie Adamos as Philip Ortiz
- Nico Antonio as Benjie Reynes
- Gee Canlas as Blessie Reynes
- Kisses Delavin as Queenie
- Dentrix Ponce as teenage Jun-Jun
- Jon Gutierrez as Jong

== Production ==
Principal photography commenced on July 29, 2019. Filming concluded on January 21, 2020.

== Ratings ==
According to AGB Nielsen Philippines' Nationwide Urban Television Audience Measurement People in television homes, the pilot episode of One of the Baes earned an 8.5% rating.

== Accolades ==
Accolades received by One of the Baes
Year	Award	Category	Recipient	Result	Ref.
2019	9th OFW Gawad Parangal	Most Popular Love Team	Ken Chan, Rita Daniela	Won	
2021	34th PMPC Star Awards for Television	Best Drama Supporting Actor	Roderick Paulate	Won	
2021	34th PMPC Star Awards for Television	Best Primetime Drama Series	One of the Baes	Nominated	
