= Meant to Be (Philippine TV series) =

2017 Philippine television drama series

- Title card
- Genre: Drama; Romantic comedy
- Created by: Renei Dimla
- Written by: Renei Dimla; Liberty Trinidad; Wiro Michael Ladera
- Directed by: LA Madridejos
- Creative director: Roy Iglesias
- Starring: Ken Chan; Jak Roberto; Addy Raj; Ivan Dorschner; Barbie Forteza
- Theme music composer: Arlene Calvo
- Opening theme: "Kahit Sino Ka Man" by Barbie Forteza, Ken Chan, Jak Roberto, Ivan Dorschner and Addy Raj
- Country of origin: Philippines
- Original language: Tagalog
- No. of episodes: 118 (list of episodes)

Production
- Executive producer: Leilani Feliciano-Sandoval
- Production locations: Quezon City, Philippines; Singapore
- Editors: Robert Pancho; Donard Robles; Julius Castillo
- Camera setup: Multiple-camera setup
- Running time: 24–43 minutes
- Production company: GMA Entertainment TV

Original release
- Network: GMA Network
- Release: January 9 – June 23, 2017

Meant to Be is a 2017 Philippine television drama romantic comedy series broadcast by GMA Network. Directed by LA Madridejos, it stars Ken Chan, Jak Roberto, Addy Raj, Ivan Dorschner and Barbie Forteza. It premiered on January 9, 2017 on the network's Telebabad line up. The series concluded on June 23, 2017, with a total of 118 episodes.

The series is streaming online on YouTube.

== Premise ==
Billie has issues in life. Her parents are not in good terms and her brother Bats is jobless. While her friendship with her best friend will be put to the test when she meets four guys of different nationalities who will compete against each other for her.

== Cast and characters ==
Cast

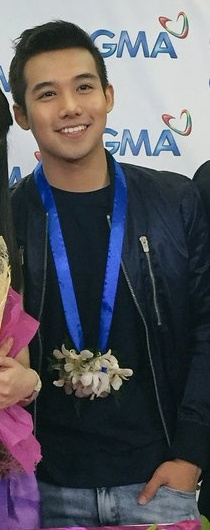
Ken Chan

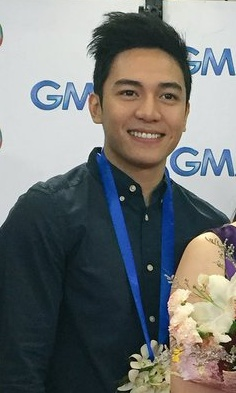
Jak Roberto

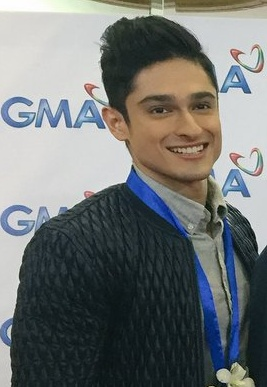
Addy Raj

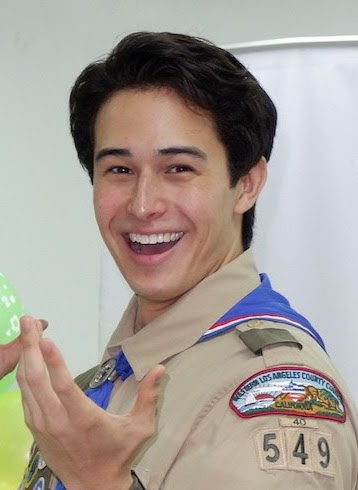
Ivan Dorschner

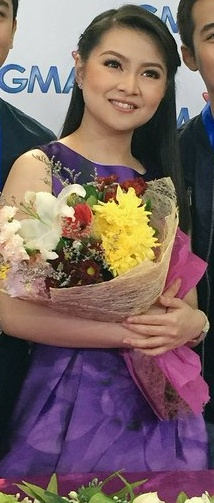
Barbie Forteza

Lead cast

- Ken Chan as Yuan Cruz Lee
- Jak Roberto as Andres "Andoy" dela Cruz
- Addy Raj as Jai Patel
- Ivan Dorschner as Ethan Spencer-Hughes
- Barbie Forteza as Maria Belinda "Billie" Bendiola

Supporting cast

- Manilyn Reynes as Amelia "Mamay" Altamirano-Bendiola
- Sheryl Cruz as Beatriz Spencer Del Valle
- Tina Paner as Suzy Altamirano
- Keempee de Leon as Wilton "Pawie" Bendiola
- Sef Cadayona as Wilbert "Bats" Bendiola
- Gloria Romero as Madonna "Madj" Sta. Maria
- Stephanie Sol as Carmina "Cacai / Cai" Bahaghari
- Zymic Jaranilla as Christopher "Toti" Del Valle Bendiola
- Mika dela Cruz as Mariko Altamirano

Recurring cast

- Nikki Co as Joshua Lee
- David Uy as Jason Lee
- Bernadette Allyson-Estrada as Lorena Cruz-Lee
- Kevin Santos as Bong
- Tess Bomb as Betchay
- Divine Tetay as Diva
- Vince Gamad as Dan
- Coleen Perez as Grace
- Dea Formilleza as Molly
- Philip Lazaro as Millicent
- Janno Gibbs as Adonis Adlawan
- Ronaldo Valdez as Enrico "Ric" Villaroman
- Dave Bornea as Andrew Zapata
- Matthias Rhoads as Gordon Smith
- Vince Vandorpe as Calvin "Avi" Del Valle Jacobs
- Carl Cervantes as Alexander "Yexel" Smith
- Arra San Agustin as Mia Smith
- Isabella de Leon as Yumi Mercado
- Ayra Mariano as Nikki
- Klea Pineda as Flo

Guest cast

- Antonio Aquitania as Dad
- Ashley Rivera as Gretch
- Betong Sumaya as a homeless man
- Wowie de Guzman as Owep
- Roi Vinzon as Jose Dela Cruz
- Jay Manalo as Melchor Dela Cruz
- Sharmaine Arnaiz as Edna Dela Cruz
- Althea Ablan as Apple Dela Cruz
- Ralph Noriega as Jason Dela Cruz
- Mosang as Fortune Teller
- Pekto as Topeks
- Vincent de Jesus as a camp facilitator
- Angel Aviles as Ric's grandchild
- Lance Serrano as a driver
- Prince Clemente as Bogs
- Vj Mendoza as Eugene
- Arra Pascual as herself
- Jennifer Lee as herself
- Khai Lim as herself
- Jeron Teng as himself
- Jay Arcilla as a bar swimmer
- Liezel Lopez as a bar swimmer
- Rojean delos Reyes as Hailey
- Denise Barbacena as a bar swimmer
- Atak Araña as Direk
- Kim Idol as Shala
- Louise Bolton as Diane
- Mara Alberto as Gia
- Max Collins as Onay Wiz
- Nicole Dulalia as April Sta. Maria
- Rob Moya as a drug dealer

== Ratings ==
According to AGB Nielsen Philippines' Nationwide Urban Television Audience Measurement, the pilot episode of Meant to Be earned a 16.8% rating. From AGB Nielsen Philippines' Nationwide Urban Television Audience Measurement people in television homes, the final episode scored a 10.3% rating.

== Accolades ==
Accolades received by Meant to Be
| Year | Award | Category | Recipient | Result | Ref. |
|---|---|---|---|---|---|
| 2017 | 31st PMPC Star Awards for Television | Best New Male TV Personality | Addy Raj | Nominated | |
| 2017 | 31st PMPC Star Awards for Television | Best Primetime Drama Series | Meant to Be | Nominated | |
