= The Lost Recipe =

Philippine television drama series

- Title card
- Genre: Drama; Romantic fantasy
- Written by: Erwin Caezar Bravo
- Directed by: Monti Puno Parungao
- Starring: Kelvin Miranda; Mikee Quintos
- Opening theme: "Abutin" by Jennifer Maravilla
- Country of origin: Philippines
- Original language: Tagalog
- No. of episodes: 52 (list of episodes)

Production
- Executive producers: Mark Anthony B. Norella; Lea Reyes
- Cinematography: Mark Ginolos
- Camera setup: Multiple-camera setup
- Running time: 20–36 minutes
- Production company: GMA Public Affairs

Original release
- Network: GMA News TV; GTV
- Release: January 18 – March 31, 2021

The Lost Recipe is a 2021 Philippine television drama romantic fantasy series broadcast by GMA News TV and GTV. Directed by Monti Puno Parungao, it stars Kelvin Miranda and Mikee Quintos. It premiered on January 18, 2021, on the network's evening line up. The series concluded on March 31, 2021, with a total of 52 episodes.

This series is streaming online on YouTube.

== Premise ==
Harvey Napoleon is a chef who is inspired by Conchita Valencia, the "Mother of Philippine Cuisine." Known for his Philippine adobo, for which he claimed is better than Conchita. When a renowned food critic visits his restaurant and gives it a one-star rating, he and his restaurant quickly loses patrons.

While running away after not paying his bill on a bar, he finds himself at the Philippine Food Museum. He encounters a magical being who gives him an access to travel in time. He time travels to the Spanish-era Philippines, where he meets Conchita and manages to grab a page of her adobo recipe. This will lead to a modified present where Conchita Valencia is not known. Knowing that there is no other way to restore the past, he vows to recreate the lost recipe.

== Cast and characters ==
Cast

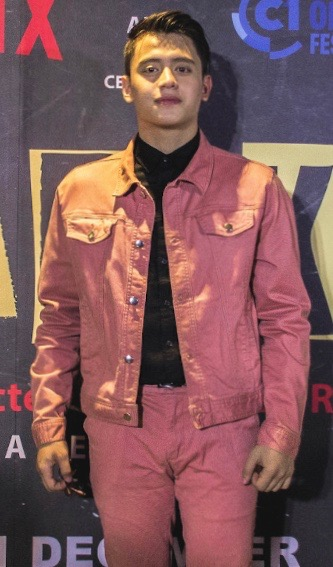
Kelvin Miranda

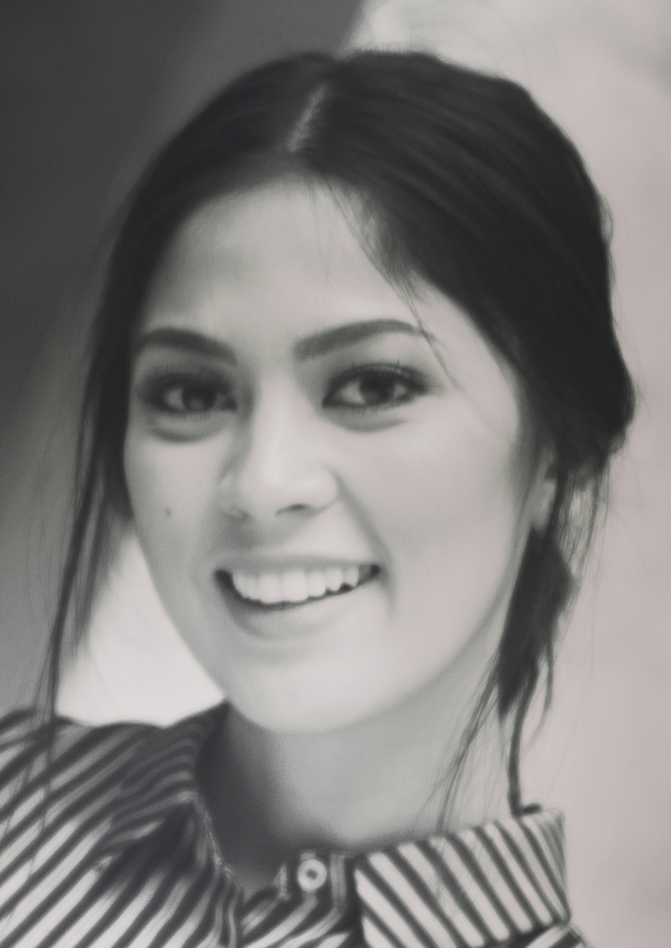
Ariella Arida

Lead cast

- Kelvin Miranda as Harvey Napoleon / Marcelo
- Mikee Quintos as Apple Valencia / Consuelo Valencia

Supporting cast

- Paul Salas as Franklin "Frank" Vergara
- Thea Tolentino as Ginger Valeria Romano
- Phytos Ramirez as Tom Miranda
- Crystal Paras as Nori Buenaventura
- Faye Lorenzo as Pepper Soriano
- Anton Amoncio as Filbert dela Cruz
- Prince Clemente as Kobe Medina
- Kim Rodriguez / Arra San Agustin / Yesha Burce as Dulce
- Topper Fabregas as Alfredo "Fredo" Legaspi
- Ariella Arida as Lotus Mandela / Elora
- Almira Muhlach as Hazel Valeria-Romano
- Maureen Larrazabal as Cherry Valencia
- Lucho Ayala as Benedict Napoleon
- Sue Prado as Honey Napoleon
- Lui Manansala as Sugar Valencia
- Arny Ross as Bree
- Jose Sarasola as Maki
- Nikki Co as Bran

Guest cast

- Allan Paule as Ruben Napoleon
- Manilyn Reynes as Conchita Valencia
- Gabby Eigenmann as Waldorf
- Addy Raj as Aldrin
- Rowena Concepcion as Manager Oreo
- Alexandra Abdon as Peachy
- Yvette Sanchez as Candy
- Pepita Curtis as Angelica
- Ruru Madrid as Jordan Buenavidez
- Shaira Diaz as Julienne Buenavidez
- Luis Hontiveros as Coco
- Franchesca Salcedo as Reese
- Michael Flores as Ceasar Romano
- Divina Valencia as Rosemary
- Brent Valdez as Rey
- Tina Paner as Cayenne
- Althea Ablan as Ham
- Ahron Villena as Time
- Will Ashley as Tarragon
- Arvic Tan as Caper / Black Cat
- Akihiro Ishii as Crisanto
- Coleen Paz as Jasmine Magbanua
- Claire Castro as Kisses
- Enrico Cuenca as Cajun
- Melissa Mendez as President Almonte

== Production ==
Principal photography commenced in November 2020.

== Accolades ==
Accolades received by The Lost Recipe
Year	Award	Category	Recipient	Result	Ref.
2021	Asian Academy Creative Awards	Best Visual or Special FX in TV Series or Feature Film	The Lost Recipe	Won	
2021	Asian Academy Creative Awards	Best Editing	John Wesly Lagdameo, Alvin John Memijie, Thea Rivera Daguman	Won	
2023	35th PMPC Star Awards for Television	Best Drama Actor	Kelvin Miranda	Nominated	
2023	35th PMPC Star Awards for Television	Best New Female TV Personality	Claire Castro	Nominated	
2023	35th PMPC Star Awards for Television	Best New Female TV Personality	Yesh Burce	Nominated	
