= The One That Got Away (Philippine TV series) =

2018 Philippine television drama series

- Title card
- Genre: Drama; Romantic comedy
- Created by: Angeli Delgado
- Written by: Renei Dimla; Liberty Trinidad; Patrick Ilagan
- Directed by: Mark Sicat dela Cruz; Rado Peru
- Creative director: Roy Iglesias
- Starring: Lovi Poe; Max Collins; Rhian Ramos; Dennis Trillo
- Narrated by: Dennis Trillo
- Opening theme: "You're a Star" by Len Calvo
- Ending theme: "GaGa" by Nar Cabico
- Country of origin: Philippines
- Original language: Tagalog
- No. of episodes: 88 (list of episodes)

Production
- Executive producer: Michelle Robles Borja
- Cinematography: Apollo Villega Anao
- Editors: Lawrence John Villena; Ron Joseph Suner; Mark Oliver Sison
- Camera setup: Multiple-camera setup
- Running time: 31–44 minutes
- Production company: GMA Entertainment Content Group

Original release
- Network: GMA Network
- Release: January 15 – May 18, 2018

The One That Got Away is a 2018 Philippine television drama romance comedy series broadcast by GMA Network. Directed by Mark Sicat dela Cruz and Rado Peru, it stars Lovi Poe, Max Collins, Rhian Ramos, and Dennis Trillo in the title role. It premiered on January 15, 2018 on the network's Telebabad line up. The series concluded on May 18, 2018, with a total of 88 episodes.

The series is streaming online on YouTube.

== Premise ==
A story about three women — Alex, Zoe and Darcy, who formed an unlikely friendship after discovering that in different times in their lives, they were romantically linked with the same guy, Liam.

== Cast and characters ==
Cast

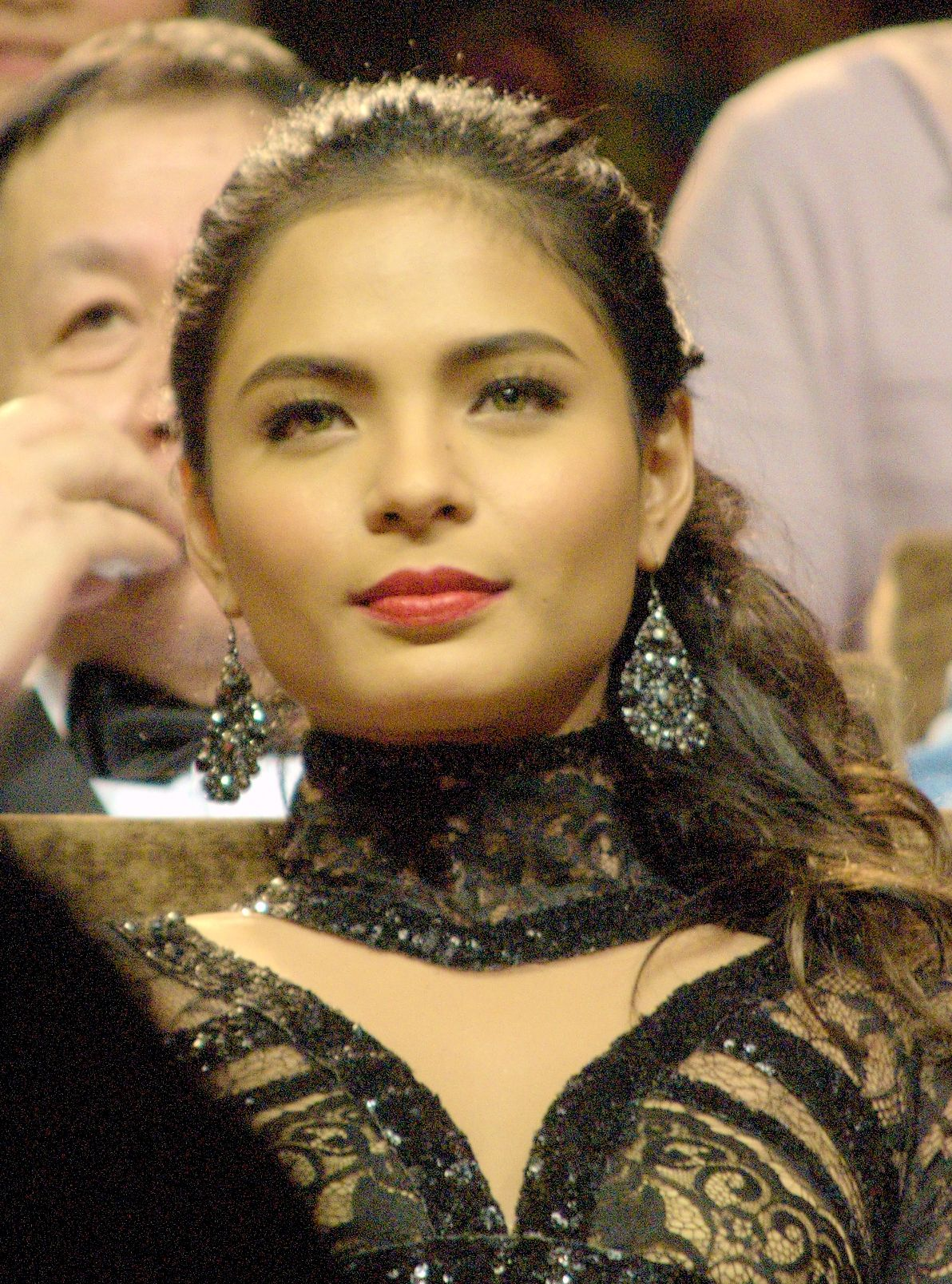
Lovi Poe

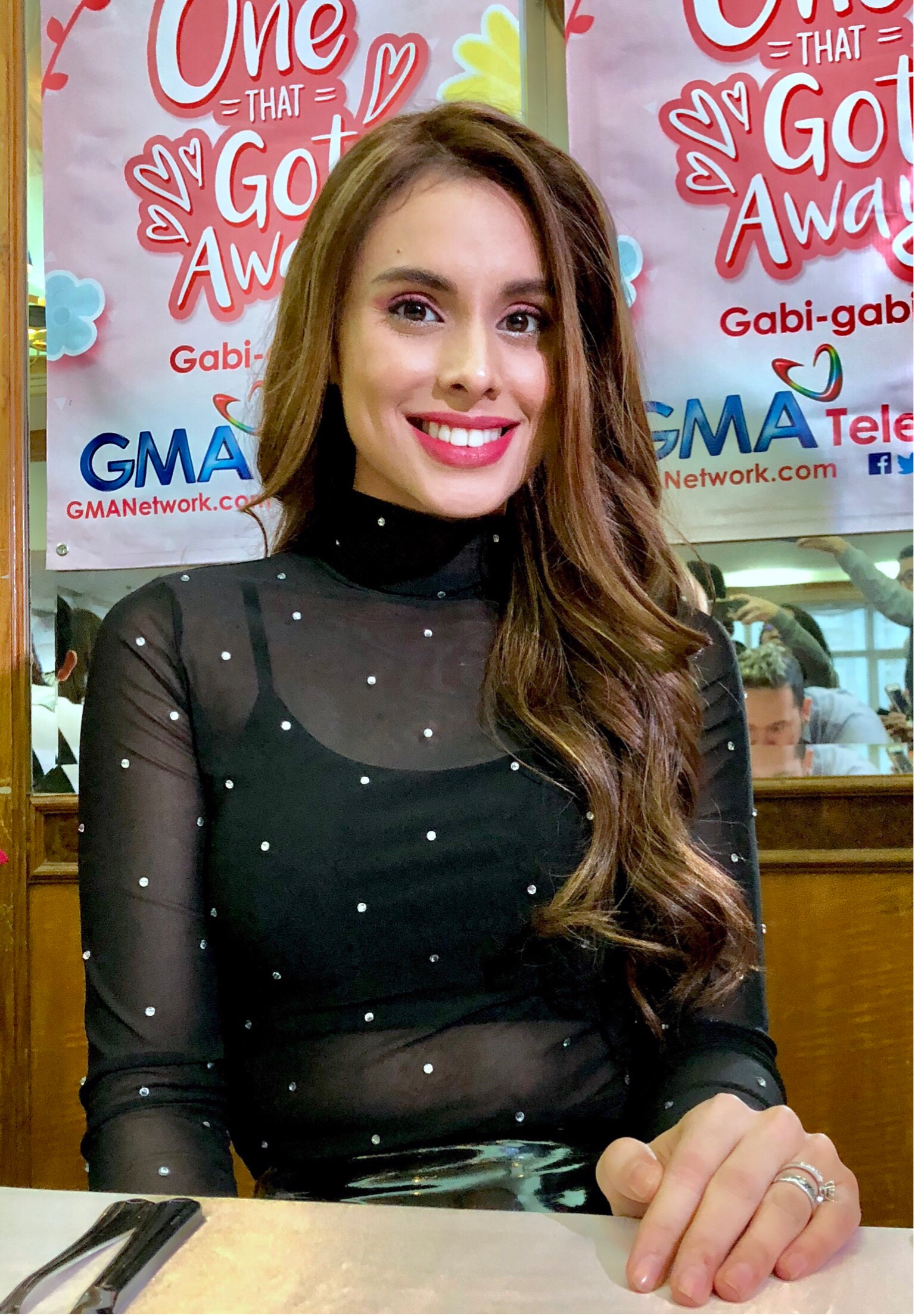
Max Collins

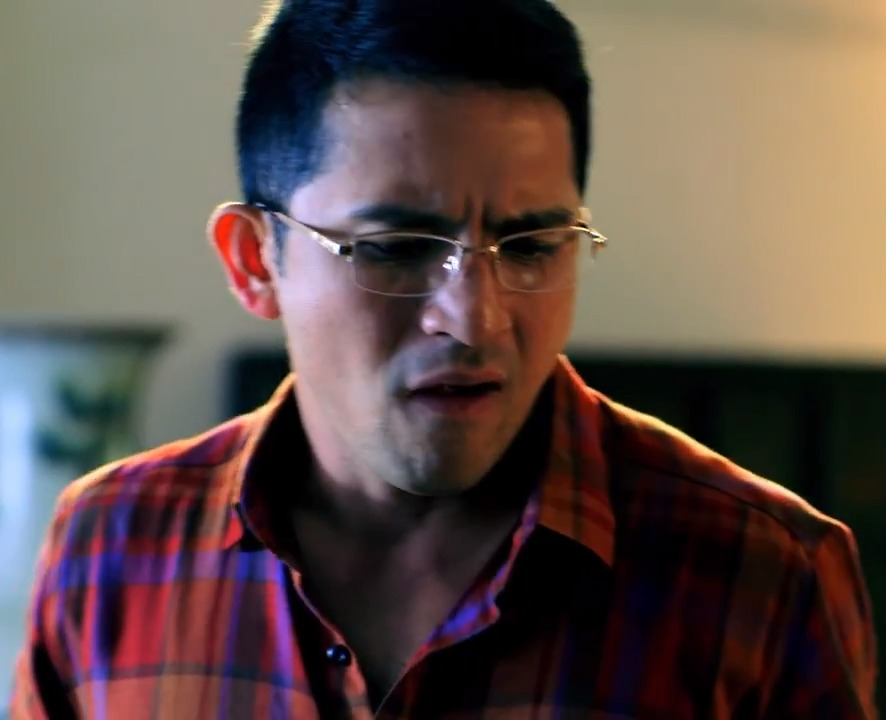
Dennis Trillo

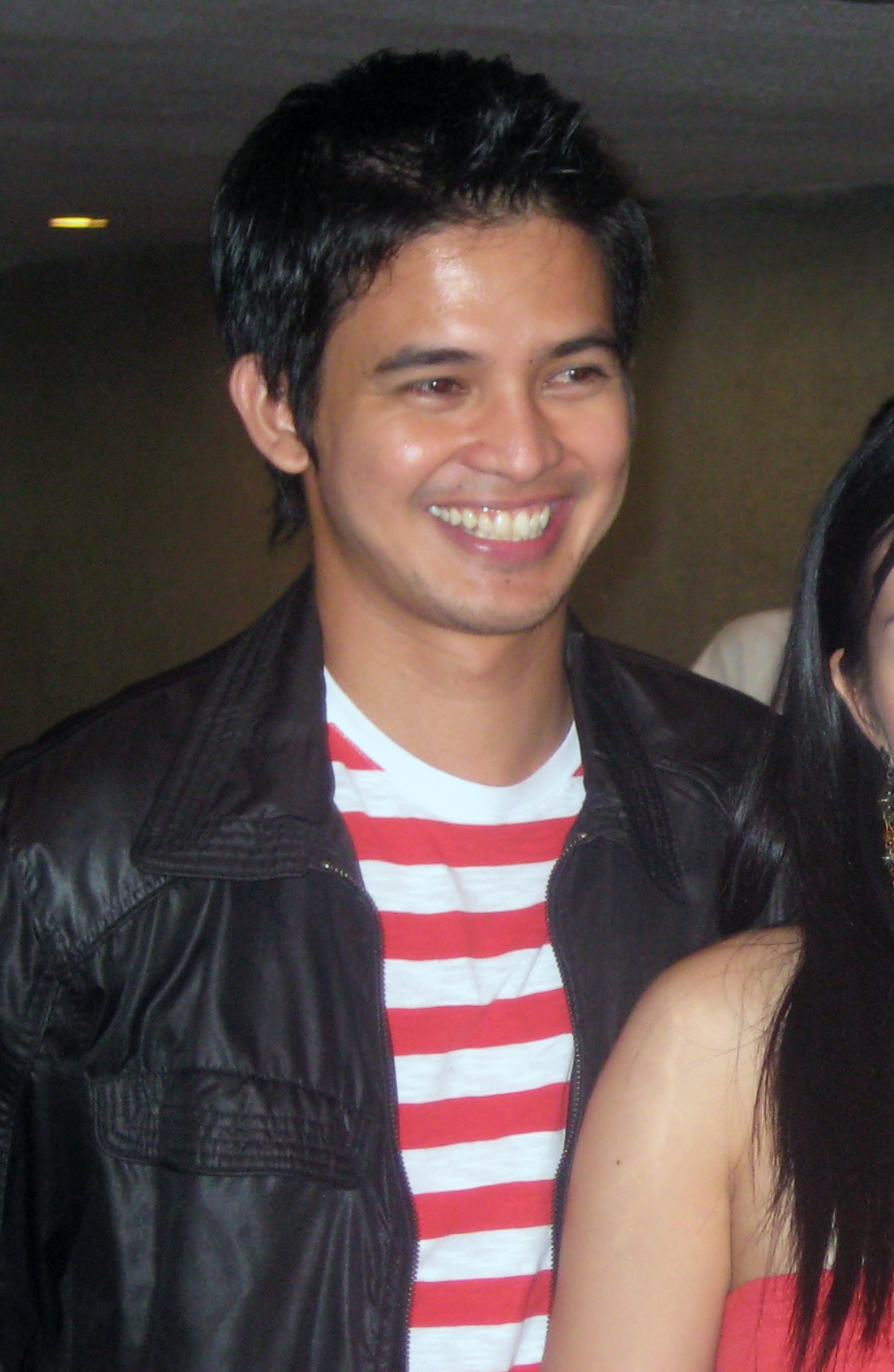
Jason Abalos

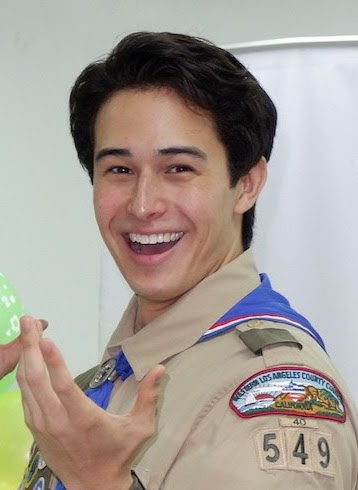
Ivan Dorschner

Lead cast

- Lovi Poe as Alexandra Rey "Alex" Makalintal-Ilustre

A workaholic cable network employee and an aspiring travel show host with a sunny disposition, everything she does is always on-schedule. Alex is also family-oriented and works hard to contribute to her family’s finances.

- Max Collins as Darlene "Darcy" Sibuyan-Sandoval

Described as strong willed and practical, she is an outspoken and independent personal trainer who hates being dependent on others. Darcy lives alone in a small apartment and assists her siblings' financial support as much as she can.

- Rhian Ramos as Sophia Elizabeth "Zoe" Velasquez-Makalintal

A happy-go-lucky swimwear designer and social media personality, she comes from a rich family and lives in an upscale condominium. Zoe is also very desperate for love and attention, as she lacked parental love at a young age.

- Dennis Trillo as William Dominic "Liam" Ilustre

A smart and handsome entrepreneur, he comes from a wealthy family and lives in their ancestral home together with his nanny. Also into vintage things and an animal lover, Liam likes women with a good sense of humor, which happens to be the common trait among his former girlfriends – Zoe, Darcy and Alex.

Supporting cast

- Jason Abalos as Gael Harrison Makalintal

Alex's older brother, a single dad to a 4-year-old boy, he works as a nurse for a living. He is a chick-magnet and goes on a lot of dates, but never introduced his girlfriends to his family.

- Ivan Dorschner as Iñigo Sandoval

A spoiled-by-his-trust-fund playboy who knows how to smooth-talk his way around ladies. He has a business degree but is reluctant to work in Liam's company, preferring to be traveler instead.

- Migo Adecer as Samuel "Sam" Isaac

Zoe's half-brother. He is deemed immature, irresponsible and undecided about what he really wants to be in his life, though he displays a talent in animation and music. He is ordered to manage his family's coffee shop business in the meantime,

- Snooky Serna as Fatima "Patty" Makalintal
- Bembol Roco as Pancho Makalintal
- Luz Valdez as Maria "Mama Ya" Delos Reyes
- Ervic Vijandre as Joni Sibuyan
- Ayra Mariano as Mikaela "Ekay" Makalintal
- Jason Francisco as Moi Padilla
- Patricia Ysmael as Onay Samartino
- Euwenn Aleta as Nicolas Monroe "Nemo" Makalintal
- Dea Formilleza as Barbara "Babs" Dacanay-Sibuyan
- Nar Cabico as Bonifacio "Bunny" Samson / Weslie "Wes"
- Elle Ramirez as Yvette
- Ashley Rivera as Paris
- Tintin Ng as Loreng
- Luz Fernandez as Mona
- Princess Guevarra as Armie
- Orlando Sol as Francis
- Myka Carel as Gigi

Guest cast

- Fabio Ide as Daniel
- Sophie Albert as Chanel
- Rodjun Cruz as Hugo
- Matthias Rhoads as Gordon
- Vince Vandorpe as Avi
- Dave Bornea as Andrew
- Renz Fernandez as Gabriel "Gab" Tan
- Kelley Day as Toni
- Marnie Lapuz as Cleo
- Pancho Magno as Paolo
- Klea Pineda as Julie
- Devon Seron as Diane
- Mark Olegario as James
- Solenn Heussaff as Georgina "George" Martel
- Faith da Silva as Chee
- Arianne Bautista as Beauty Martinez
- Aaron Yanga as Lance
- Lharby Policarpio as Nurse Red
- Lucho Ayala as Popoy
- Joemarie Nielsen as Rob
- Addy Raj as Ekay's love interest

== Production ==
Principal photography commenced in November 2017. Filming concluded in May 2018.

== Ratings ==
According to AGB Nielsen Philippines' Nationwide Urban Television Audience Measurement People in television homes, the pilot episode of The One That Got Away earned a 7.7% rating. The final episode scored a 10.9% rating.
