= Addy Raj =

Indian actor, model and singer (born 1995)

- Born: 30 August 1995 (age 31); Ajmer, Rajasthan, India
- Education: Graphic and Website Designer, Bachelor of Arts
- Occupations: Actor, model and singer
- Years active: 2015–present
- Agents: ABS-CBN (2015–2016; 2019) GMA Artist Center (2016–2019; 2020–2021) Powerhouse Arte Inc. (2019–2020) Firestarters Production Inc.(2021–2022); Freelance (2022–present)
- Known for: I Love OPM, Jai Patel in Meant to Be
- Height: 5 ft 9 in (175 cm)
- Spouse: Barbii Reeder (Engaged 2025)
- Website: www.gmanetwork.com/artistcenter/talents/530/Addy-Raj

Adhiraj Gaur (born 30 August 1995), popularly known as Addy Raj (/rɑːdʒ/; Tagalog pronunciation: [ˈɾah, ˈɾadʒ]), is an Indian actor, singer, model and former track athlete living in the Philippines. He was introduced in showbiz by ABS-CBN's I Love OPM in 2016. He later transferred to rival network GMA and was offered a lead role in the TV series Meant to Be, a romantic-comedy drama. He portrays the role of Jai Patel, an Indian suitor to Billie Bendiola (portrayed by Barbie Forteza), in the show.

== Early life and career ==
Addy was born in Ajmer, Rajasthan in India to Suchek Gaur and Anita Gaur. His father worked with the Government of India in the forest services for 40 years, retiring in 2019. His mother is a homemaker. He also has an older sister, Soumya Gaur, who runs a travel company based in Jaipur, Rajasthan known as Yaan Tours (yaantours.com) that specializes in organizing private tailor-made tours across India.

Addy studied in a prestigious boarding school in India known as Mayo College, from 2006 – 2011. It was here that he took a keen interest in sports and went on to become the Athletics Captain of his batch. He later featured in the list of 20 fastest runners of India and the fastest man of New Delhi in a 100m event in the year 2014. Apart from this, Addy was also a lead guitarist at his school band and continues to play even now in his free time.

Addy first arrived in the Philippines as an exchange student in Ateneo de Manila University, where he stayed for two months. He instantly fell in love with the country and upon finishing graduation back in India, decided to return to the Philippines to begin a career in showbiz. He soon started as a commercial model and was eventually discovered by ABS-CBN and appeared in a reality singing competition, I Love OPM. He later transferred to the rival network GMA and bagged one of the leading roles in the TV series, Meant to Be, a romantic –comedy drama where he played the role of Jai Patel, an Indian suitor to Billie Bendiola (portrayed by Barbie Forteza) in the show.

Following the success of Meant to Be, Addy was nominated for the 31st PMPC Star Awards for Television as the ‘Best New Male TV Personality’. He also made it to the list of ‘Top 10 Hottest Male Celebrities’ by Cosmopolitan Magazine and landed the cover page for Garage, MEGA Man and Yes magazine. He also went on to receive an endorsement for Bench, a popular clothing brand in the Philippines and formed an ‘Addycted Fansclub’, wherein his fans call themselves Addycted.

After his lead role in Meant to Be, Addy was seen in many of GMA Network's television series including Sirkus, Kapag Nahati ang Puso, The One That Got Away, Super Ma'am, One of the Baes and Descendants of the Sun. He also appeared in a variety of shows like Eat Bulaga!, Wowowin, Maynila, Daig Kayo ng Lola Ko, Unang Hirit, Sunday PinaSaya, Dear Uge, Celebrity Bluff and Taste Buddies.

After being an exclusive artist of GMA Network for 2 years, Addy was spotted in many other projects like the movie The Panti Sisters (Black Sheep Productions), M.M.K. (ABS CBN), Hush (iWantTFC) as a freelance artist. He was also seen as the celebrity of the month for Playboy Philippines.

Add calls himself an ally of the LGBTQ+ community and is very vocal about his views on straight people standing up for their LGBTQ+ friends. He has worked in collaboration with the Village People magazine, San Miguel Light and has also participated in the Metro Manila Pride march for the same cause.

He says he loves Filipinos and would like to stay in the Philippines for the rest of his life.

== Filmography ==
=== Film ===
Year	Title	Role(s)	Production company
2019	The Panti Sisters		Black Sheep Productions, IdealFirst, Quantum Films, ALV Films

=== Television ===
Year	Title	Role(s)
2016	I Love OPM	Performer
2017	Meant to Be	Jai Patel
2017	Full House Tonight	Various roles
2017	Dear Uge: NPBSB	Francis
2017	Daig Kayo ng Lola Ko	Princes Kumar
2017	3 Days of Summer	Himself
2018	Super Ma'am	Christian
2018	Dear Uge: Bongga Bonita	Jerome
2018	Sirkus	Sandino
2018	Kapag Nahati ang Puso	Prince Hamesh Gupta
2018	Daig Kayo ng Lola Ko: Okay Ka, Genie Ko	Genie Ralph
2019	Maynila: Lend Me your Love	Talha
2019	Maalaala Mo Kaya: Tubig	Saudi Police
2019	One of the Baes	Carlos Falcon
2020	Descendants of the Sun	Alif Fayad
2021	The Lost Recipe	Addy
2021	Hush	James
2021	Owe My Love	Amir
2023	Fit Check: Confessions of An Ukay Queen	Addy Raj

== Awards and nominations ==
Year	Association	Category	Nominated work	Result
2017	31st PMPC Star Awards for Television	Best New Male TV Personality	Meant to Be	Nominated

== See also ==
- Ken Chan
- Jak Roberto
- Ivan Dorschner
