= Straight to the Heart (2016 film) =

Straight to the Heart is a 2016 Filipino independent LGBT-themed drama-comedy film starring Carl Guevara and Gwen Zamora. The film is written and directed by Dave Fabros. It is presented by Cignal, Mediaquest, PLDT Smart, in association with Unitel, a production by Visioncapture Media, in partnership with Creative Minds Strategic Marketing and Events, and Creative Saints, sponsored by David's Salon and Watsons.

The film was an official entry to the 2nd CineFilipino Film Festival.

In the film, Carl plays the role of a gay hairdresser who falls into a coma and when he wakes up is being attracted to women.

== Cast ==
=== Main ===
- Carl Guevara
- Gwen Zamora

=== Supporting ===
- Nico Antonio
- Ricci Chan
- Vincent de Jesus
- Kiko Matos
- Pinky Amador
- Dina Padilla
- Cris Lomotan
- Gilleth Sandico
- Bibo Reyes
- Enrico Cuenca
- Garie Concepcion
