= Super Ma'am =

Philippine television drama series

- Title card
- Also known as: My Teacher, My Hero
- Genre: Action drama; Fantasy
- Created by: Aloy Adlawan
- Written by: Aloy Adlawan; Kit Villanueva-Langit; Renato Custodio Jr.; Glaiza Ramirez
- Directed by: Lord Alvin Madridejos; Albert Langitan
- Creative director: Roy Iglesias
- Starring: Marian Rivera
- Theme music composer: Tata Betita
- Opening theme: "Siya ay si Super Ma'am" by John Kenneth Giducos
- Country of origin: Philippines
- Original language: Tagalog
- No. of episodes: 95 (list of episodes)

Production
- Executive producer: Nieva M. Sabit
- Editors: Robert Pancho; Jen Sablaya; Mark Sison; Ella Cruz; Dic Lavastida; Ver Custudio
- Camera setup: Multiple-camera setup
- Running time: 23–37 minutes
- Production company: GMA Entertainment TV

Original release
- Network: GMA Network
- Release: September 18, 2017 – January 26, 2018

Super Ma'am (international title: My Teacher, My Hero) is a Philippine television drama action fantasy series broadcast by GMA Network. Directed by Lord Alvin Madridejos and Albert Langitan, it stars Marian Rivera in the title role. It premiered on September 18, 2017 on the network's Telebabad line up. The series concluded on January 26, 2018, with a total of 95 episodes.

Originally titled as The Good Teacher, it was later renamed to Super Ma'am. The series is streaming online on YouTube.

== Premise ==
Minerva Henerala, a high-school teacher, lost her mother and sister to an archaeological accident many years ago. She had an encounter with winged creatures and shape shifters called Tamawo. Throughout the years, the Tamawo have made their way into the city and abduct children to feed on their energy. Minerva becomes "Super Ma'am", a Tamawo hunter and saves the human world from them.

== Cast and characters ==
Cast

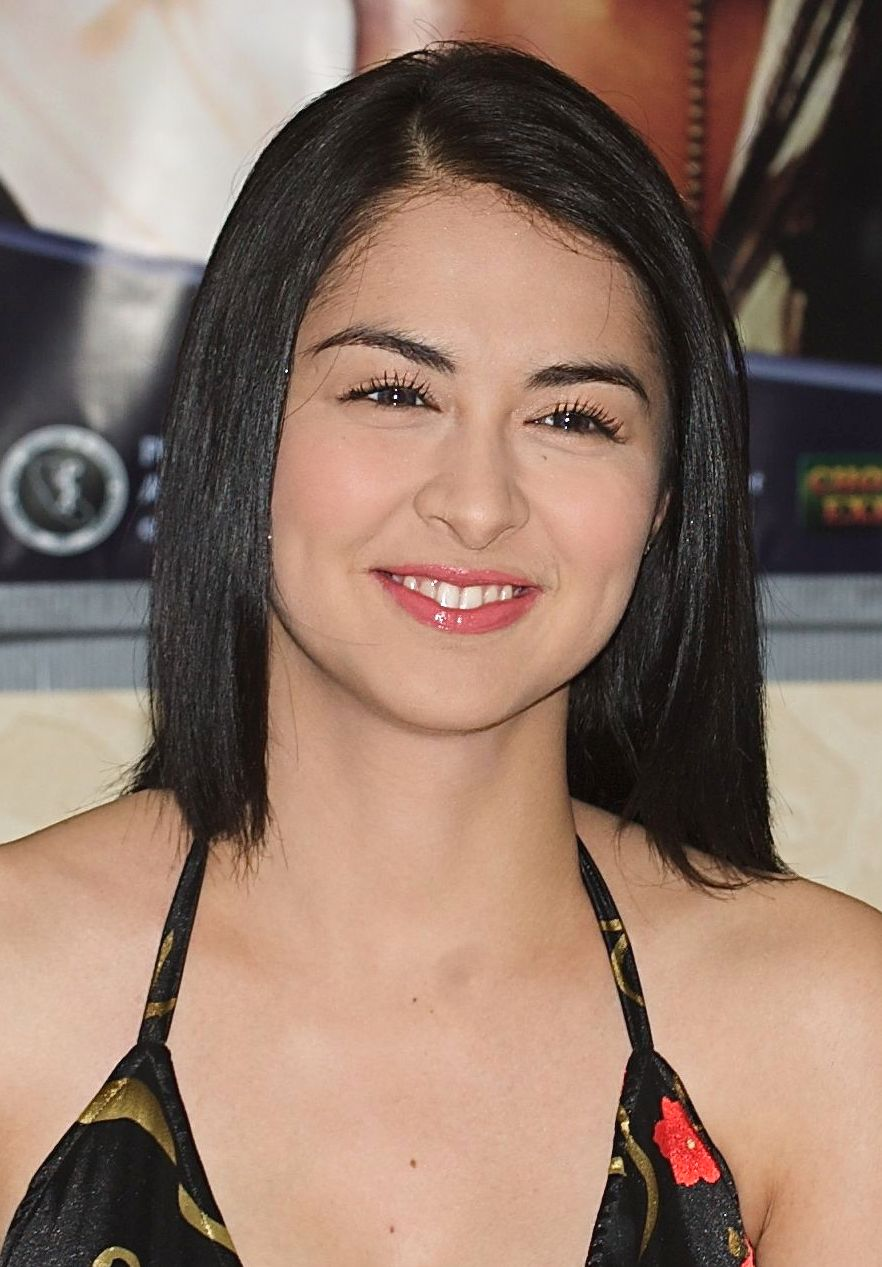
Marian Rivera

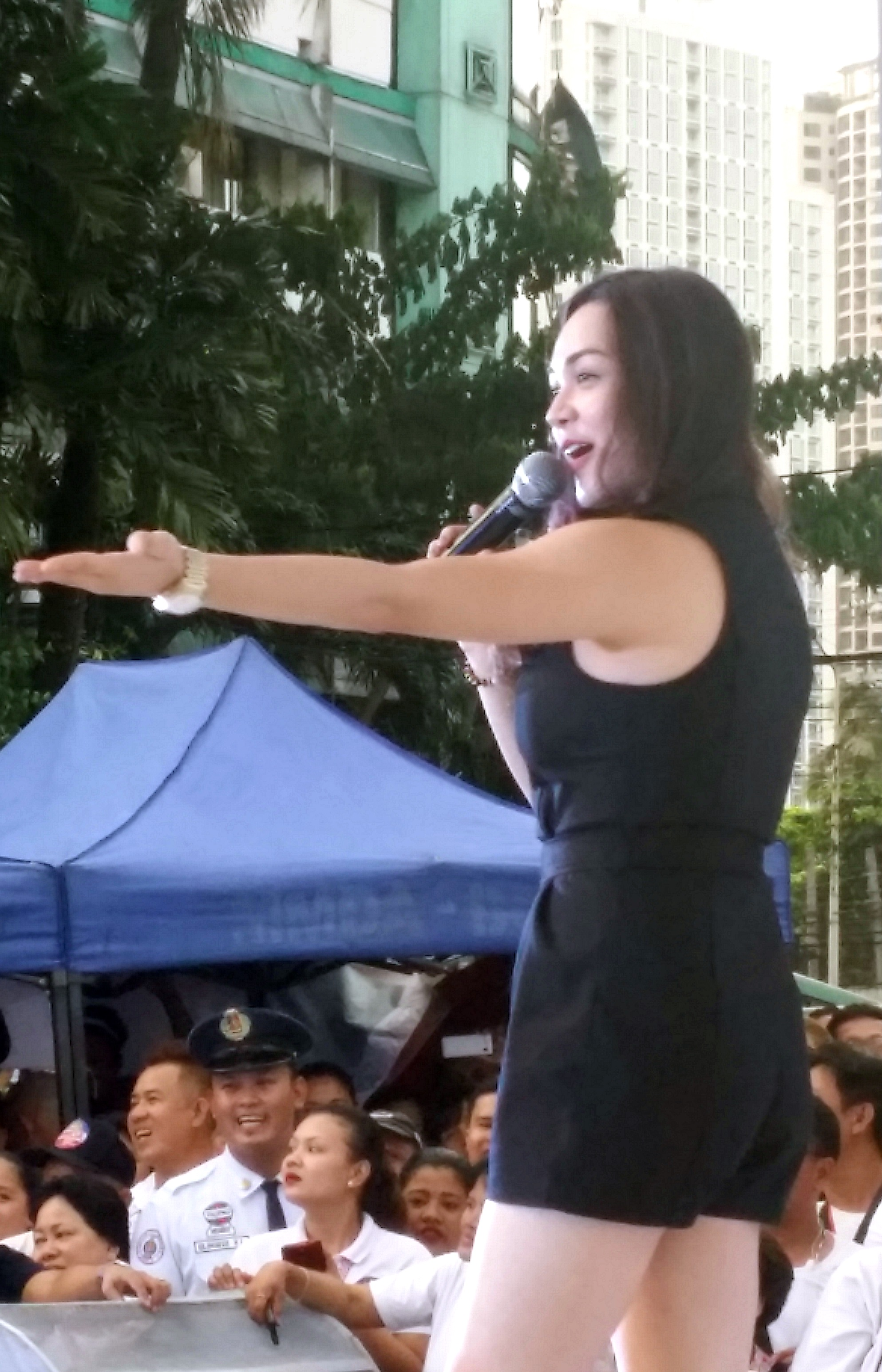
Meg Imperial

Lead cast

- Marian Rivera as Minerva Henerala / Super Ma'am

Supporting cast

- Helen Gamboa as Lolita Honorio
- Kim Domingo as Avenir Segovia / Mabelle Henerala / Vera
- Joyce Ching as Dalikmata / Dolly
- Kristoffer Martin as Aceron "Ace" Mendoza / Lakandayo
- Jerald Napoles as Esteban "Teban" Magbanua
- Jillian Ward as Michelle Ombrero
- Jackie Lou Blanco as Greta Segovia
- Matthias Rhoads as Trevor Jones
- Al Tantay as Chaplin Henerala
- Ashley Ortega as Kristy Garcia / Maureen
- Meg Imperial as Jessica Montesa
- Kevin Santos as Casper
- Shyr Valdez as Lailani
- Enrico Cuenca as Jake
- Julius Miguel as Bixby Henerala
- Isabella de Leon as Rafa
- Ashley Rivera as Rose
- Vincent Magbanua as Eric Gumatay
- Andrew Gan as Keno
- Marika Sasaki as Dina
- Ralph Noriega as Onin Cortez

Guest cast

- Ai-Ai delas Alas as Barbie
- Dina Bonnevie as Raquel Honorio-Henerala
- Carmina Villarroel as Ceres
- Elijah Alejo as younger Minerva
- Sofia Pablo as younger Mabelle
- Barbara Miguel as younger Jessica
- Rafa Siguion-Reyna as Samuel
- Zackie Rivera as Isay
- Richard Quan as Gorio
- Mark Andaya as Pido
- Tonio Quiazon as Arlan
- Ivan Dorschner as Isko Dagohoy
- Conan Stevens as Baraka
- Jeric Gonzales as Isagani Dagohoy
- Althea Ablan as Katrina "Katitay" Magbanua
- Lucho Ayala as Adonis
- Shermaine Santiago as Linda
- Diana Zubiri as Gilda "Jill" Magpantay
- Epy Quizon as Jacqueline "Jack" Magpantay
- Divine Tetay as Wendy "Wen" Magpantay
- Jade Lopez as Vicky Cortez
- Lianne Valentin as Esper
- Ermie Concepcion as Tale
- Neil Ryan Sese as Arjay
- Rita Avila as Lorenza Diaz
- John Kenneth as Justin Ombrero
- Liezel Lopez as Sonia
- Toby Alejar as Frankenstein
- Gil Cuerva as Xavier
- Patricia Tumulak as Black Super Ma'am
- Boobay as Lovely
- Barbie Forteza as Pearly
- Addy Raj as Christian
- Joanna Katanyag as Celeste
- Ayeesha Cervantes as Wendy
- Ces Aldaba as Lolong
- Beki Belo as Mema Sirena
- Andrea del Rosario as Azravach
- Arny Ross as Serpentina
- Jazz Ocampo as Mamba
- Ameera Johara as Pythona
- Victor Neri as Agalon
- Jak Roberto as Isidro "Sidro" Dagohoy

== Production ==
Principal photography commenced in July 2017.

== Ratings ==
According to AGB Nielsen Philippines' Nationwide Urban Television Audience Measurement People in Television Homes, the pilot episode of Super Ma'am earned a 9.5% rating. The final episode scored a 10.7% rating. The series had its highest rating on November 24, 2017 with an 11.1% rating.
