= Ashley Rivera (actress) =

Filipino Internet personality, actress and television presenter

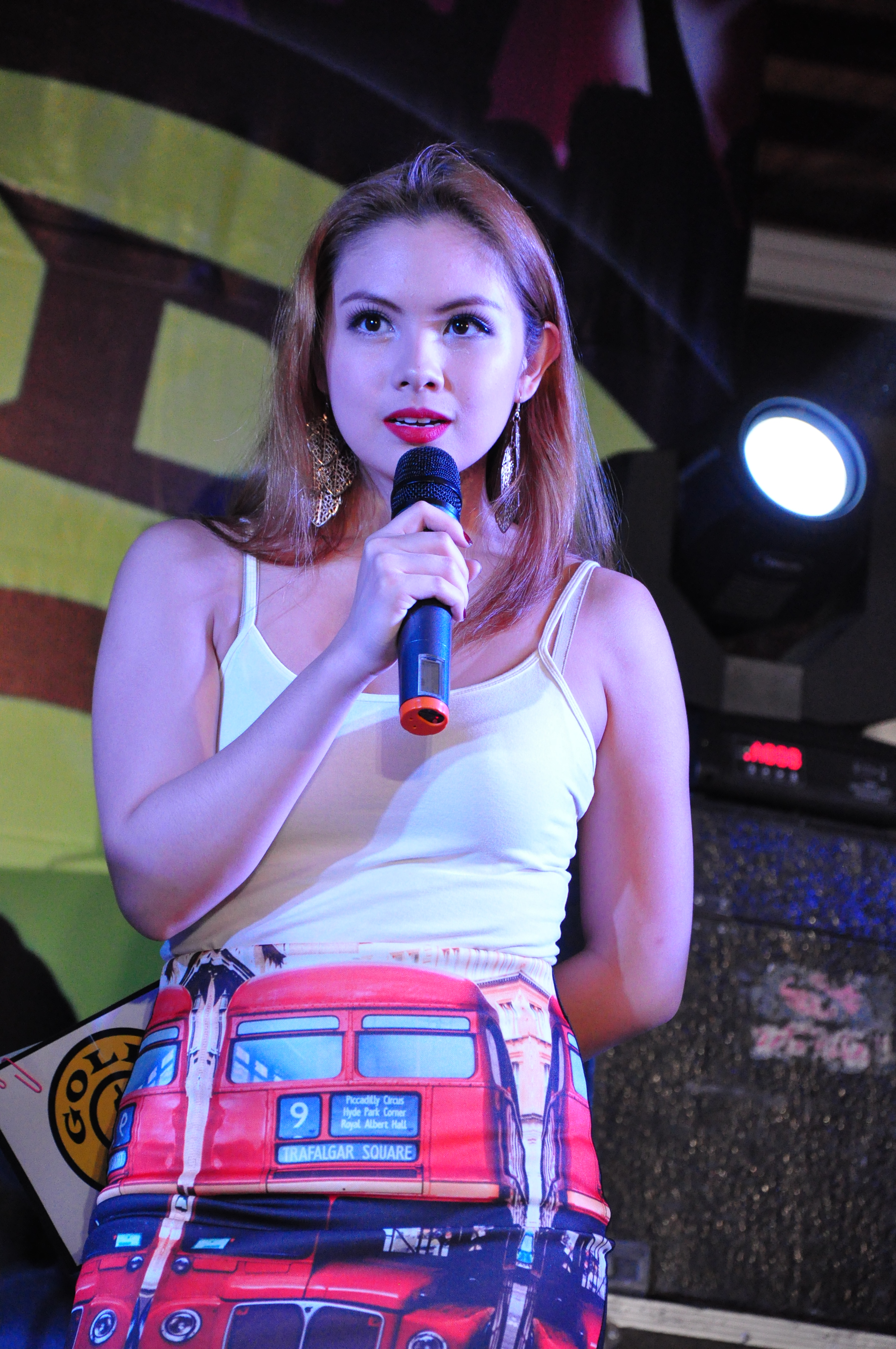
- Ashley in 2012 at Christmas Party of Golds Gym Philippines
- Born: April 19, 1992 (age 34)
- Other name: Petra Mahalimuyak
- Occupations: Content creator; actress; television presenter
- Years active: 2011–present
- Agents: Viva Artist Agency (2014); Sparkle (2017–present)

YouTube information
- Channel: @PetraMhalimuyak
- Genre: Comedy
- Subscribers: 166 thousand
- Views: 24.6 million
- Last updated: August 2, 2025

Ashley Rivera (born April 19, 1992) is a Filipino Internet personality, actress, and television presenter. She is known by her alter ego, Petra Mahalimuyak. She gained recognition in 2011 for her humorous online content, in which she spoke English with an exaggerated Filipino accent in her videos. Among her most viewed uploads on YouTube are "How to Dance in a Club", "How to Get Abs in 1 Min", "How to Dougie", and "My British Accent". She has appeared in television series such as Legally Blind (2017) and The Better Woman (2019). She was also part of the comedy gag show Bubble Gang and the sitcom Happy Together.

== Career ==
Rivera had initially pursued a career in acting in the Philippines before relocating to Las Vegas, where she began producing video content that led to her emergence as an internet personality around 2011. She later returned to the Philippines to resume her professional acting career for the second time. Rivera also worked as a DJ at clubs and music festivals. Viva Artist Agency took notice of Rivera's content around 2014 with the intention of signing her as one of their talents. She was subsequently given her own show, Petra's Panniest, which further developed and expanded the concept of her original videos.

Rivera's initial appearance was in the romantic drama film A Secret Affair (2012) as Amie Ignacio. She also had roles in films including the romantic comedy My Lady Boss (2013) as Kai, The Gifted (2014), and the comedy-drama Your Place or Mine? (2015) as Camille. Rivera transferred to GMA Network in 2017 and became a regular cast member of the comedy gag show Bubble Gang. She portrayed Gretchen in the romantic drama television series Meant to Be, Diana Perez in the drama Legally Blind, and Rose in the action-drama Super Ma’am. In 2018, she played Paris Villacorta in the romantic comedy-drama The One That Got Away.

In 2019, she portrayed Chesi Rodriguez in the drama The Better Woman and took on the role of Eleonor in the action-comedy film Mission Unstapable: The Don Identity. She played Lani in the 2021 television drama anthology series I Can See You, Pam in the sitcom Happy Together, and appeared in the 2023 miniseries In My Dreams. That same year, she played Frieda Palero in the drama The Seed of Love and Terry in the sitcom Open 24/7. In 2024, Rivera guested on the variety show It's Showtime. In 2025, she portrayed Gemmalou in the romantic comedy-drama Binibining Marikit.

== Filmography ==
=== Film ===
Year	Title	Role
2012	A Secret Affair	Aimee
2013	My Lady Boss	Shantu
2014	The Gifted	Batchmate
2015	Your Place or Mine?	Camille
2016	The Motion of the Sun	Cafe Student
2019	Mission Unstapabol: The Don Identity	Eleonor
2024	I Am Not Big Bird	Cathy
2025	Sampung Utos Kay Josh	Genesis

=== Television ===
Year	Title	Role	Note(s)
2017–2022	Bubble Gang	Herself (various roles)	
2017–2021	Dear Uge	Various roles	Episode roles
2017	Road Trip	Herself (guest)	
2017	Meant To Be	Gretchen	
2017	Legally Blind	Diana Perez	
2017	Super Ma'am	Rose	
2017–2018	Celebrity Bluff	Herself (guest player)	
2018–2025	Magpakailanman	Various roles	Episode roles
2018	The One That Got Away	Paris Villacorta	
2018	My Special Tatay	young Chona Mariano	
2018	Victor Magtanggol	News Editor	
2019–2023	Tadhana	Various roles	Episode roles
2019	The Better Woman	Chesi Rodriguez	
2019–2025	The Boobay and Tekla Show	Herself (guest)	
2021–2023	Happy Together	Regina "Pam" Ferrer / Doña Victorina	
2021	I Can See You: On My Way To You	Lani	
2021	The World Between Us	young Rachel Labradilla	
2022–2025	TiktoClock	Herself (Guest)	
2022	Wish Ko Lang!	Herself (various roles)	
2023	The Seed of Love	Frieda Pelayo	
2023	Open 24/7	Terry	
2023	Black Rider	Paloma Nadela	
2023	Fast Talk with Boy Abunda	Herself (guest)	
2023–2025	Family Feud Philippines	Herself (guest player)	
2024	Pepito Manaloto: Tuloy ang Kuwento	Malou	
2024	Asawa ng Asawa Ko	Eunice	
2024	Pinoy Crime Stories: Bugbog sa Pag-Ibig	Maribel	
2025	Binibining Marikit	Gemmalou Reyes	
2025	Encantadia Chronicles: Sang'gre	Mukha ng Batis ng Katotohanan	
2025	Your Honor	Herself (guest)	
2026–Present	Kalurks!	Herself	
