= Carl Cervantes =

Filipino actor, singer and host

- Born: November 27, 1994 (age 31)
- Education: Ateneo de Manila University (BS, MA)

Carl Lorenz Cervantes (born November 27, 1994) is a Filipino actor and author.

== Early life and education ==
Cervantes graduated in 2015 with a Bachelor of Science in Psychology from the Ateneo de Manila University. He also obtained a MA degree in Counseling Psychology from the same institution.

== Career ==
He became known after joining GMA Network’s reality show, Starstruck 6. Since then, he has bagged various roles in GMA shows such as Magpakailanman, Maynila, and Meant To Be. He has also appeared as a guest or segment host in various shows on GMA News and Public Affairs, such as Good News and AHA!. In 2020, he went viral for dressing up as the mayor of Pasig city, Vico Sotto.

=== Interests ===
Cervantes has a social media page on the psychology of Philippine spirituality. He has also written a short book on the matter.

== Filmography ==
=== Television ===
| Year | Title | Role |
|---|---|---|
| 2018 | Maynila | TJ |
| 2018 | Ang Forever Ko'y Ikaw | James Bones (uncredited) |
| 2017 | Maynila | Garri |
| 2017 | Meant to Be | Yexel Smith |
| 2016 | Magpakailanman | Vincent |
| 2016 | A1 ko Sa'yo | Buyer of Bra |
| 2016 | Dear Uge | Miguel |
| 2016 | Juan Happy Love Story | Prince |

== Published works ==
=== Books ===
- Deep Roots: Essays on the Psychic and Spiritual in Philippine Culture. KamitHiraya, 2022.

=== Journal articles ===
- The Limitations and Potentials of Tarot Readings in Times of Uncertainty. Diliman Review, 2021.
