= Mikee Quintos =

Filipino actress and singer (born 1997)

- Born: Mikaela Marie Javier Quintos; December 18, 1997 (age 28); Sampaloc, Manila, Philippines
- Other names: Mikee, Mang Kiko
- Education: University of Santo Tomas (BS)
- Occupations: Actress; singer
- Years active: 2015–present
- Agent: Sparkle (2015–present)
- Known for: Lira in Encantadia

Mikaela Marie Javier Quintos (born December 18, 1997) is a Filipino actress and singer. She is best known for her role as Lira in Encantadia (2016).

== Early life and education ==
Mikaela Marie Javier Quintos was born on December 18, 1997, in Manila, Philippines, to Eduardo "Wardee" Quintos XIV and Jocelyn Javier, both of whom are politicians and who would later serve as Manila councilors from the 4th district. She began singing publicly at the age of seven for her parents' political campaign. She has three sisters: Louisa Marie (incumbent Manila councilor), Denise and Jodee. She graduated high school from St. Scholastica’s College- Manila. She took her architecture course at the University of Santo Tomas and graduated in 2025.

== Filmography ==
=== Television ===
Year	Title	Role	Note(s)
2016–2017	Encantadia	Diwani / Sang'gre Lira / Milagros "Mila" Quizon	Support / Protagonist
2016	Usapang Real Love: Perfect Fit	Cindy / Ella	Episode guest
2017	Tadhana: Millionaire Maid	Maritess	Episode guest
2017	Dear Uge: Hot Momma	Christy	Episode guest
2017	Mulawin vs. Ravena	Sang'gre Lira	Guest role
2017	Road Trip	Herself	Episode guest
2017	Daig Kayo ng Lola Ko: Golda and the Three Pandas	Golda	Episode guest
2017	Alyas Robin Hood	Marya	Guest role
2018	Sirkus	Mia	Lead role / Protagonist
2018	Sherlock Jr.	Siri's Voice	Support role / Protagonist
2018	Wagas: Baliw na Puso	Jaezelle	Episode guest
2018–2019	Onanay	Maila Matayog–Samonte	Main role / Protagonist
2018–2019	Studio 7	Herself	Main Performer
2019	Bagong Pilipinas	Herself	Guest host
2019	Tadhana: Obsession	Vina	Episode guest / Antagonist
2019–2020	The Gift	Amor	Support Role / Protagonist
2020	Makulay ang Buhay	Herself	Supporting role
2021	Regal Studio Presents: Promises to Keep	Jenny	Episode guest
2021	The Lost Recipe	Apple Valencia / Consuelo Valencia	Main role / Protagonist
2021–2022	Pepito Manaloto: Ang Unang Kuwento	Elsa Dela Cruz	Main role / Protagonist
2022	Apoy sa Langit	Ning Hidalgo	Main role / Protagonist
2022	Mano Po Legacy: The Flower Sisters	Carmen Yap-Chua	Special participation
2023	The Write One	Victoria "Via" dela Peña	Support role / Antagonist
2024	Lilet Matias: Attorney-at-Law	Lovely "Langgay" Mercado-Veloso	Guest role
2024	Shining Inheritance	younger Aurea	Guest role
2024	It's Showtime	Herself	Guest performer
2024–2025	Lutong Bahay	Herself	Host
2025–2026	Encantadia Chronicles: Sang'gre	Sang'gre Lira	Support role / Protagonist
2025	Slay	Sugar Alvarez	Main role
2025	Sanggang-Dikit FR	Tere	Guest role / Protagonist
2025	Pepito Manaloto: Tuloy ang Kuwento	Young Elsa Dela Cruz-Manaloto	Episode guest
2026	Pinoy Big Brother: Collab 3.0	Herself	Housemate

== Accolades ==
Year	Awards	Category	Recipient	Result	Ref.
2017	31st PMPC Star Awards for Television	Best New Female TV Personality	Encantadia	Won	
