= Enrico Cuenca =

Filipino actor

- Born: Enrico Nicolas Rodrigo Cuenca; December 7, 1991 (age 34); Makati, Philippines
- Other name: Rico
- Education: California State University Long Beach (BA)
- Occupation: Actor
- Years active: 2016–2021
- Agent(s): Mercator Model Management, GMA Artist Center

Enrico Nicolas Rodrigo Cuenca is a Filipino actor appearing in TV shows like Super Ma'am starring GMA-7's Primetime Queen Marian Rivera and episodes in Wagas and Daig Kayo ng Lola Ko. He has also appeared in commercials from Filipino fast-food chain Jollibee.

Cuenca is a member of GMA Artist Center, and is 5'10" tall.

Enrico started acting in theatre at a young age. He studied at the Ateneo De Manila University and graduated from California State University in Long Beach, California. Cuenca is signed with Mercator Model Management managed by Jonas Gaffud.

Cuenca starred in the viral Valentine’s Day Jollibee commercial entitled “Crush” with fellow GMA Network artist Ash Ortega, as well as its sequel the following year entitled "Homecoming". Enrico has since appeared in the movies Recipe for Love and Spirit of the Glass 2: The Haunted, playing a character named Andre.

== Filmography ==
=== Television ===
Year	Title	Role	Notes
2021	The Lost Recipe	Cajun	Guest Cast
2018	Onanay	Oliver Pascual	160 episodes
2018	Dear Uge	Adam	Episode: "The Poser, You, and I"
2017-2018	Super Ma'am	Sir Jake	95 episodes
2017	Wagas	Julio	Episode: "Wedding in Heaven" and other episodes
2017	Daig Kayo ng Lola Ko	Tonyo	Episode: "Tonyo's Story of Honesty and Simplicity"

=== Film ===
Year	Title	Role	Notes
2016	Straight to the Heart	Pastor	
2017	Spirit of the Glass 2: The Haunted	Andre	
2018	Recipe for Love	Benjamin	
