= Ivan Dorschner =

Filipino American actor, television host and model

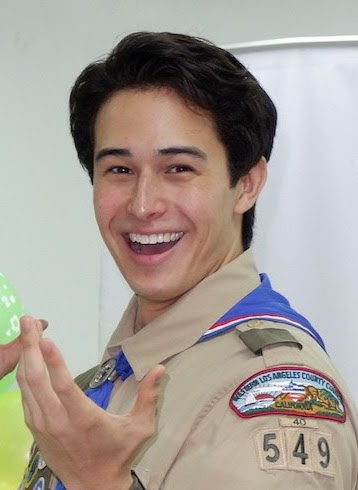
- Dorschner celebrates his birthday at the BSP headquarters in Manila, September 2017
- Born: Ivan Anthony Dorschner (Note: Ivan Dorschner was born in the United States of America. Thus, he does not possess his mother's maiden name which is Reyes.); September 21, 1990 (age 35); Los Angeles, California, United States
- Citizenship: Philippines; United States
- Education: Verdugo Hills High School; College of the Canyons
- Occupations: Actor, television host, model
- Years active: 2010–2019
- Modeling information
- Height: 1.78 m (5 ft 10 in)
- Hair color: Black
- Eye color: Dark Brown
- Agency: Star Magic (2010–2012); GMA Artist Center (2016–2019)
- Website: Official profile

Ivan Anthony Dorschner (born September 21, 1990) is a Filipino-American actor, television host and model based in the Philippines. He is best known for being a former housemate of the Philippine reality television show Pinoy Big Brother: Teen Clash 2010. He is currently under contract to GMA Network, as well as the network's talent management arm GMA Artist Center along with Mika Dela Cruz and Addy Raj.

== Early life and education ==
Dorschner was born on September 21, 1990, in Los Angeles, California, to a German-Irish father and a Filipino mother. He has four half-siblings, two from his father's previous marriage and the other two from his stepmother, who is Korean. Dorschner was raised in California. On his summer vacation, he visited the Philippines. During his childhood, he was a Boy Scout and received the highest rank of Eagle Scout. He graduated in 2008 from Verdugo Hills High School, in Tujunga, CA. He studied at the College of the Canyons in International Diplomacy studies (switching from Bio-Science) but was put on hold until his third year when he decided to remain in the Philippines.

== Career ==
=== 2010–2012: Beginnings and breakthrough ===
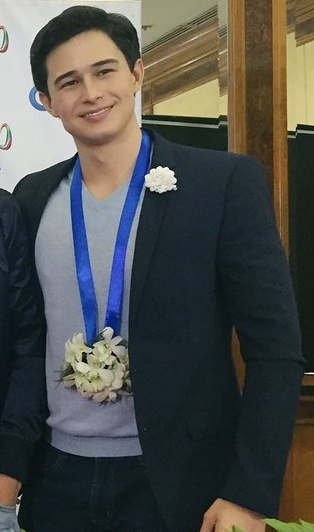
Dorschner in November 2016

Prior to a television career, Dorschner modeled and did photoshoots both in the United States and the Philippines. He became a ramp model for the clothing line Folded and Hung; was a guest on the show Us Girls; was brought to the stage on It's Showtime and played HepHepHooray in one of the Philippines' popular TV program Wowowee. At the time of that visit, he did not realize he would be on a reality show Pinoy Big Brother: Teen Clash 2010. Dorschner stayed in the house for 3 1/2 months; with the help of his fans voting for him to stay. He emerged fifth among the six finalists topped by Fil-Aussie James Reid who gained 19.75 percent of text votes. Aside from movies and TV roles, Dorschner played in the 2011 theater production of Snow White and Prince Oswald, as Prince Oswald.

=== 2016–present: Transfer to GMA Network, revived career and rising popularity ===
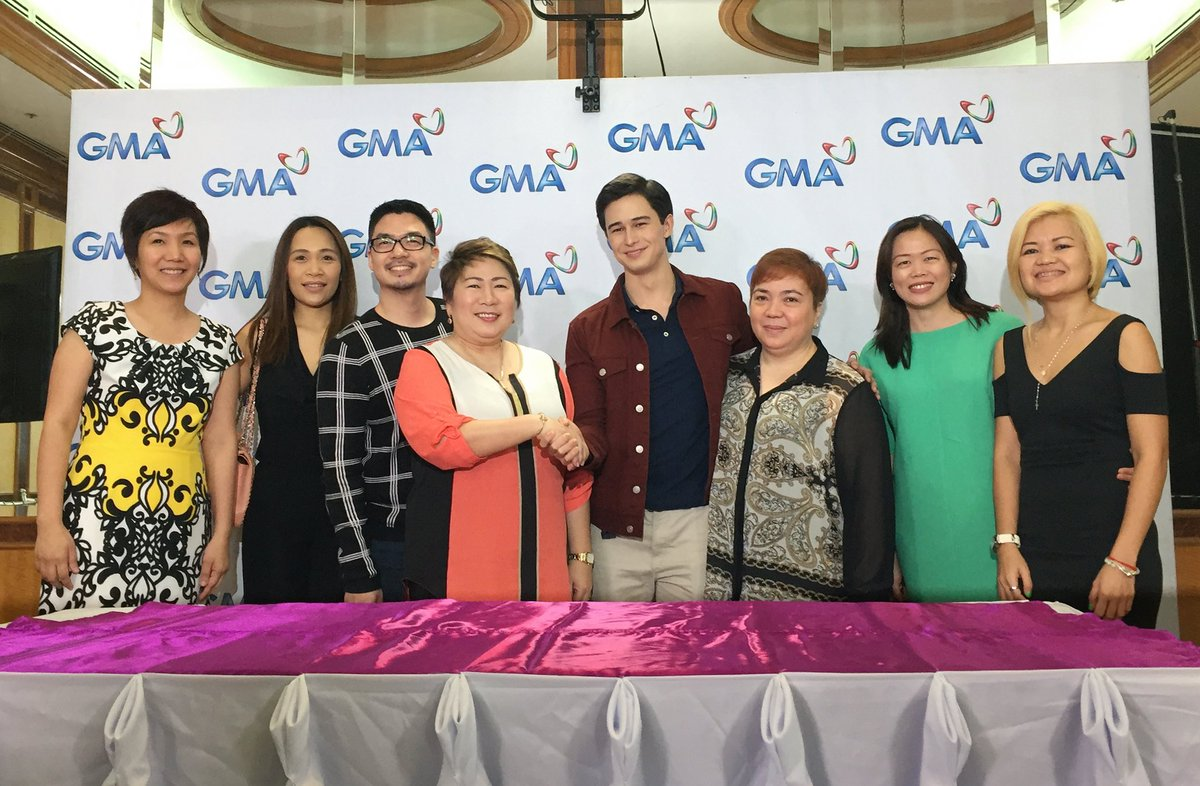
Dorschner after signing contract with GMA Network, November 2016

In November 2016, after a four year-hiatus from showbiz, Dorschner, alongside fellow Kapuso actor turned Meant to Be co-star Addy Raj signed an exclusive contract with GMA Network and also management contract with GMA Artist Center as well. In January 2017, he starred and rose to fame in Meant to Be along with the second peek of Barbie Forteza tagged as VanBie. In October of the same year, he appeared in action-fantasy series Super Ma'am as Isko Dagohoy.

In January 2018, Dorschner was chosen to portray Inigo Sandoval in Kapuso rom-com series The One That Got Away alongside Dennis Trillo, Lovi Poe, Rhian Ramos, Max Collins, Jason Abalos and Migo Adecer.

== Filmography ==
=== Film ===
| Year | Title | Role |
|---|---|---|
| 2012 | The Reunion | Paul Michael |
| 2012 | Shake, Rattle & Roll XIV | Emerson |
| 2013 | A Moment in Time | Brix |

=== Television ===
| Year | Title | Role |
|---|---|---|
| 2010 | Pinoy Big Brother: Teen Clash 2010 | Himself/Housemate |
| 2010–2012 | ASAP | Himself/Performer |
| 2010–2011 | Shoutout! Friends-Thurs | Performer/Host |
| 2011 | Maynila: Girl Name...Faith | Ace |
| 2011 | Good Vibes | Gabriel "Gab" Weiss |
| 2011 | Maynila: Queen's Secret | Mat |
| 2011 | 100 Days to Heaven | Young Bart Ramirez |
| 2011 | Confidance | Host |
| 2012 | Walang Hanggan | Cameo Appearance |
| 2012 | Kung Ako'y Iiwan Mo | Mark |
| 2012 | Maynila: Bet Kita | Alex |
| 2012 | Luv U | Evan "Tisoy" Escence |
| 2016 | Sunday PinaSaya | Himself/Guest |
| 2016 | Magic of Christmas: The 2016 GMA Christmas Special | Himself/Performer |
| 2017 | Meant to Be | Ethan Spencer-Hughes |
| 2017 | 3 Days of Summer | Himself |
| 2017 | Super Ma'am | Isko Dagohoy |
| 2018 | The One That Got Away | Iñigo Sandoval |
| 2019 | Pepito Manaloto | Chino |

=== Music video appearances ===
| Year | Song | Artist |
|---|---|---|
| 2010 | Jeepney Love Story | Yeng Constantino |
| 2012 | Happy | Emmanuelle Vera |

== Awards and nominations ==
| Year | Nominee / work | Award | Result |
|---|---|---|---|
| 2017 | Ivan Dorschner | 65th FAMAS Awards - German Moreno Youth Achievement Award (special award) | Won |
