= Jak Roberto =

Filipino actor, model, and singer (born 1993)

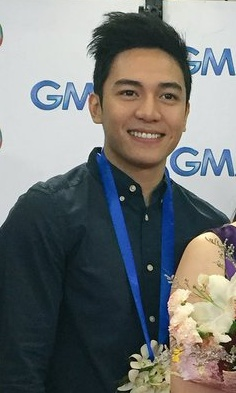
- Born: Jan Rommel Osuna Roberto; December 2, 1993 (age 32); Nagcarlan, Laguna, Philippines
- Education: Philippine Women's University Sta. Cruz, Laguna (BSHRM)
- Occupations: Actor; singer; television presenter
- Years active: 2011–present
- Agent: Sparkle
- Height: 1.73 m (5 ft 8 in)
- Partner: Barbie Forteza (2017–2024)
- Family: Sanya Lopez (sister)
- Musical career
- Genres: Pop; OPM
- Instrument: Vocals
- Years active: 2015–present
- Label: GMA (2015–present)

YouTube information
- Channel: Jak Roberto
- Years active: 2019–present
- Genres: Everyday life; travel
- Subscribers: 3.48 million
- Views: 166.1 million
- Last updated: May 16, 2026

Jan Rommel "Jak" Osuna Roberto (born December 2, 1993) is a Filipino actor, singer, and television personality known for his work in Philippine television. He began his career through Walang Tulugan with the Master Showman (2012) after being introduced to veteran host German Moreno. Roberto later appeared in supporting roles in various GMA Network programs before gaining wider recognition for his role as Ambo in The Half Sisters (2014) and as part of the romantic comedy series Meant to Be (2017). He also became a member of the boy group 3LOGY while continuing his acting career.

== Early life ==
Jak Roberto was born as Jan Rommel Osuna Roberto on December 2, 1993, in Nagcarlan, Laguna, Philippines to Ramil Roberto and Marlene Osuna. He has a younger sister named Shaira Lenn Osuna Roberto, popularly known under the stage name Sanya Lopez. Roberto currently resides in Tandang Sora, Quezon City with sister Sanya.

== Career ==
Roberto was five years old when his father died of a heart attack. He and his siblings were then raised by their mother and grandmother. Due to financial difficulties, he learned to work at an early age to help support the family. According to his mother, Marlyn Roberto, he actively sought work even during childhood. In grade school, he earned money by painting gravestones during Undas, receiving around ₱25 per grave, and earning approximately ₱200 to ₱300 on busy days. He used his income for school expenses to avoid asking for allowance. He also worked as a fast-food service crew member.

Roberto repeatedly auditioned for showbiz roles but faced multiple rejections. After their family moved from Laguna to Bulacan, attending auditions in Manila became more difficult due to distance and travel costs. He continued traveling for auditions, commercials, and indie projects, at one point nearly giving up on his dream. His breakthrough came during a "final audition" for a minor role in the film El Presidente (2012), where he appeared as a soldier extra and met talent manager and host German Moreno. Through Moreno's encouragement, he was invited to join Walang Tulugan with the Master Showman, marking his entry into showbiz at around 18 years old in 2011. Later, he entered showbiz through Walang Tulugan with the Master Showman, hosted by German Moreno, and eventually became a recognized actor and the brother of actress Sanya Lopez.

Roberto later appeared on small roles on various programs of GMA Network. In 2014, Roberto portrayed Ambo in the afternoon series The Half Sisters. While building his career, he completed a degree in Hotel and Restaurant Management at the Philippine Women's University and remained under GMA Artist Center management. He later joined the boy group 3LOGY in 2015 and gained wider recognition after his role in Meant to Be (2017).

== Personal life ==
Roberto and Barbie Forteza first met in 2017 while working on the rom-com series Meant to Be. Their closeness sparked dating rumors the same year, which grew through similar social media posts and public interactions. They confirmed their relationship in 2018 and later became popularly known as the "JakBie" love team. Over the years, their relationship was often admired but also repeatedly surrounded by rumors of breakups, especially in 2023 and 2024 when they were seen attending some events separately. Despite this, they consistently denied issues and publicly affirmed their trust and commitment, with Roberto often praised for being calm and supportive amid Forteza's busy career. After seven years together, Forteza announced their breakup on January 2, 2025, describing it as a "beautiful goodbye". She thanked Roberto for their time together and asked for privacy. No specific detailed reason for the breakup was publicly disclosed. Roberto has not released any statement regarding the separation.

== Filmography ==
=== Television ===
Year	Title	Role	Ref.
2012–2021	Pepito Manaloto: Ang Tunay na Kuwento	Eric Mercado	
2012	Cielo de Angelina	Andrei	
2013	With a Smile	Jak	
2014	Magpakailanman: Ang Pusong 'di Makalimot	Biboy	
2014	Ilustrado	Máximo Viola	
2014–2016	The Half Sisters	Ambo	
2015	Magpakailanman: Boses ng Puso	Chris	
2015	Magpakailanman: Ang batang isinilang sa bilangguan	Ryan	
2015	Pari 'Koy	Omar	
2016	Usapang Real Love: Dream Date	Juan Miguel "Yuan" Samaniego	
2016	Karelasyon: Ambisyosa	Andrei	
2016	Magpakailanman: Anak, saan kami nagkamali?	Randy	
2016	Wagas: Pag-ibig sa Kabilang Daigdig	Jonathan	
2016	Hanggang Makita Kang Muli	Elmo Manahan-Villamor	
2016	A1 Ko Sa 'Yo	Jake	
2016–2019	Dear Uge	Berto	
2016–2022	Bubble Gang	Himself	
2017	Meant to Be	Andres "Andoy" dela Cruz	
2017	My Love from the Star	Himself	
2017	Tadhana: Pamana	Tonyo	
2017	Magpakailanman: My Girlfriend's Secret Affair with my Father	Buboy	
2017–2018	Road Trip	Himself (guest)	
2017	Wagas: Kambal Tuko	Jhanny	
2017	Daig Kayo ng Lola Ko: Alamat ni Bernardo Carpio	Bernard Carpio	
2018	Wagas: Karugtong ng Damdamin	Cesar Apolinario	
2018	Wagas: Matafat na Pag-ibig	Mark Vasquez	
2018	Wagas: Ngayon Lang	LM Cancio	
2018	Maynila: Battered Boyfriend	Ambet	
2018	Magpakailanman: Yuki (A Japinay Story)	Ryan	
2018	Magpakailanman: Ang Babaeng Tinimbang Ngunit Sobra	Adrian	
2018	Super Ma'am	Isidro "Sidro" Dagohoy	
2018	Contessa	Santiago "Jong" Generoso Jr.	
2018	Daddy's Gurl	Jonas	
2019	Kara Mia	Bonifacio "Boni" Burgos	
2019	Maynila: My Beautiful Bossing	Binoy	
2019	Wagas Presents: Wait Lang... Is This Love?	Eugene Bitao	
2019	Tadhana: Sex Slave	Ben	
2019	Magpakailanman "Viral Macho Dancer" (The Dante Gulapa story)	Dante Gulapa	
2019	Magpakailanman: The Girl in the Sex Video Scandal	Dan	
2019	Stories for the Soul: Inang Hindi Patitinag	Irvin	
2020	Magpakailanman: Fishergays: Mga tigasing sirena sa laot	Michael	
2020	Tadhana: Xtudent	Marco	
2020	Magpakailanman: The 'Dance King of Quarantine' (The DJ Loonyo Story)	Rhemuel "DJ" Loonyo	
2021	Dear Uge: Asimtopangit	Mandy	
2021	Regal Studio Presents: Anyare Sa'yo	Erwin	
2021	My Fantastic Pag-Ibig Presents: Trophy Girl	Baste	
2021	Heartful Café	Jasper	
2021	Stories from the Heart: Never Say Goodbye	Bruce Pelaez	
2021	Magpakailanman: Boxer and His Scholar	Jonel Borbon	
2021	Tadhana: Memory	Roy	
2021	Tadhana: Kabayaran	Miguel	
2022	Bolera	Pepito "Toypits" Canlas	
2022	Magpakailanman: Batang Kampeon sa Bilyaran	Johann Chua	
2022	Happy Together	Banjo	
2023	The Missing Husband	SPO2 John Edward "Joed" Enriquez Lazaro	
2024	Black Rider	Moises / Calvin Magallanes (real)	
2025	It's Showtime	Himself (guest)	
2025	Regal Studio Presents: Sugar and Spy	Spy	
2025	My Father's Wife	Gerald Medina	
2026	Taskforce Firewall	Hendrix "Hex" Silverio	

== Discography ==
- "May Be It's You" with 3LOGY

== Awards and recognitions ==
- 2016 FAMAS Award "German Moreno Youth Achievement Awardee"
- 2017 "Gintong Kabataan Award" for Field of Entertainment
- 2017 ALTA Media Icon Awards "Most Promising Male Star for TV"
- 2017 Inding-Indie Award "Pinaka-huwarang Artista ng mga Kabataan."
- 2017 31st PMPC Star Awards for Television "German Moreno Power Tandem w/ Barbie Forteza"
- 2021 2nd Annual TAG Awards Chicago "Best Loveteam w/ Barbie Forteza"
- 2022 Outstanding Men and Women Awards
- 2023 7th GEMS Awards "Best Performance by an Actor in a Supporting Role(Bolera)"
- 2024 7th Philippine Empowered Men & Women of the Year
