= List of Codename: Asero characters =

This is a list of fictional characters from the Philippine drama Codename: Asero. The series primarily centers around a man leading two different lives caught between two warring secret agencies: The Advocate and The Empire.

The series began airing on July 14, 2008, replacing Carlo J. Caparas' Joaquin Bordado on its timeslot.

The full characters guide can be found here, provided by iGMA.tv.

== Main characters ==
| Name | Played by | Summary | Codename |
|---|---|---|---|
| Grecko Abesamis | Richard Gutierrez | The top secret agent of Advocate who becomes a cyborg after a deadly mission that almost costs his life. | Phoenix (Advocate) / Asero (Empire) |
| Emily San Juan | Heart Evangelista | An OFW in Dubai who will do anything to help her mother and her blind brother. She has feelings for Grecko. | - |

== Secret agencies ==
=== The Advocate ===
| Name | Played by | Summary | Codename |
|---|---|---|---|
| Ibsen Abesamis | Richard Gomez | The loving father of Grecko. Unknown to his family and Grecko, he is one of the leaders of The Empire. He revives Grecko and makes him a machine codenamed Asero. After the betrayal by the Empire, he seeks revenge on Empire leaders. He is now joining the forces of Advocate after his former girlfriend's passing. | Zeus |
| Geron Aguilar | Janno Gibbs | The cowboy, chickboy partner and best friend of Grecko. Geron is placed as the leader of Advocate after the passing of Lady Q. He saved his wife and his daughter while killing Vladimir. | Rockstar |
| Bodjie X | Michael V. | The prankster-inventor for the Advocate. He has dreams to have an outside mission with Grecko and other agents. | Bodjie X |
| Sandy Quintana | Carmina Villarroel | The leader of The Advocate who has her own dark past. Believed to be Ibsen's former girlfriend and Grecko's mother. Shot by Chairman Walden. Lady Q ended her life. | Lady Q |
| Auring "Aureana" | Francine Prieto | Bodjie X's funny sexy assistant. | Tiny Girl |
| Troy Motimor | Marky Cielo† | An arrogant new agent who idolizes Grecko. He is killed by a giant robot to save Grecko's life. | Beatbox |
| Minnie Agustin | Bubbles Paraiso | The bubbly but deadly agent of Advocate. | Vixen |
| Felix Reyes | Rocky Gutierrez | The new agent who befriends Grecko. He has sent by Lady Q as a spy to infiltrate The Empire. Killed by Apollo after he gave an information on whereabouts of Lady Q. | Mercury (Advocate) / Felix (Empire) |
| Dayze Tagimoro | Ehra Madrigal | The daughter of the Japanese scientist who transforms Grecko into a cyborg. She's a technical handler of Grecko / Asero. She is joining the Advocate after she and her father got betrayed by Empire. She saved Emily's life from Dave. | — |
| Dr. Tagimoro | Pen Medina | The father of Dayze who also transforms Grecko into a cyborg. He gets betrayed by the Empire so he sides with the Advocate. | - |
| Chairman Walden | Chinggoy Alonzo | A retired agent who needs help from Advocate to stop Empire's plans. He's also Lady Q's mentor and one of the founders of Advocate. Walden is the one who put Lady Q's child away from her. He is both Asero/Grecko and Lady Q's nemesis. Shot and killed by a wounded Lady Q. | CW |

=== The Empire ===
| Name | Played by | Summary | Codename |
|---|---|---|---|
| Gary Morales | Ramon Gutierrez | One of the leaders of The Empire who has everything to defeat Grecko/Agent Phoenix. He's responsible for making alliances with terrorist and he became a superior leader. Killed by Grecko / Asero. | Apollo |
| Claire Morales | Rhian Ramos | The daughter of Gary Morales/Apollo. She is also a cyborg like Grecko/Asero. Gary/Apollo sends her daughter to a country for good. | — |
| Jupiter | Bobby Andrews | One of the leaders of The Empire of unquestionable loyalty. He's also Asero/Grecko's mortal enemy. Burned by his own creation, a huge ultra robot named "Zeus" due to its overloading of power, but he's alive until dies in process. | Jupiter |
| Vladimir Ledesma | Elvis Guttierez | Apollo's bodyguard who will become Grecko's enemy. Killed by Geron. | Emoure |
| Greta | Jenny Miller | Jupiter's girlfriend and one of the agents of The Empire. She's arrested by the military army. | Lady Dragon |
| Agent Malta | Sheree | Sexy but deadly agent of The Empire. She's arrested by the military army along with Greta. | Tiger Lady |

== Extended cast ==
| Name | Played by | Summary |
|---|---|---|
| Dave Aviejo | Paolo Contis | The ex-boyfriend of Emily who wants to get her back. Dave is also the one who make Grecko's life miserable. He ended up being arrested after Dayze saved Emily from his harm. |
| Fran Guevarra | Chynna Ortaleza | The ex-girlfriend of Grecko who eventually becomes his enemy. She will make Emily's life miserable. |
| Bertita San Juan | Caridad Sanchez | The materialistic grandmother of Emily and Nicky who wants nothing but money for her own wants. She was killed by Dave during the discontinued marriage of Emily and Dave. |
| Nicky San Juan | Rainier Castillo | The blind brother of Emily. He needs money for his undergoing surgery. |
| Tam-Tam | Martin de los Santos | The son of one of the helpers of the Abesamis family who idolizes Grecko. |
| Gigi Benini | Chariz Solomon | Emily's best friend. |
| Cleo Marasigan | Karen delos Reyes | She's another beshies of Emily. |
| Patrice "Peachy" Abesamis | Ysa Villar | Grecko's younger sister who was held hostage by his enemies. |
| Gelyn Abesamis | Joanne Quintas | The loving mother of Grecko and wife of Ibsen. |
| Delia San Juan | Shyr Valdez | The kind mother of Emily and Nicky. |
| Ellen Aguilar | Ana Roces | Wife of Geron. |
| Sofie Aguilar | Sandy Talag | Daughter of Geron. |
| Minerva Aviejo | Isay Alvarez | Mother of Dave who really dislikes Emily and makes her life miserable. |

== See also ==
- GMA Network
