= Lovely Day (disambiguation) =

"Lovely Day" is a 1977 song by Bill Withers, covered by many artists.

Lovely Day may also refer to:

== Music ==
- "Lovely Day", a song by Pixies from the 1991 album Trompe le Monde
- "Lovely Day", a song by Lit from the 1999 album A Place in the Sun
- "Lovely Day", a 2010 single by Emi Tawata

== Other uses ==
- Lovely Day (TV program), a Philippine TV informative show
- Lovely Day, a production company started by Diederick Santer in 2010
- Lovely Day (horse) (foaled 2010), a Japanese Thoroughbred racehorse
