= Cielo de Angelina =

Philippine television drama series

- Title card
- Also known as: Angelina's Sky
- Genre: Drama
- Written by: Edith Asuncion; Joy Villanueva; Mari Joy Valenzuela
- Directed by: Omar Deroca
- Starring: Bea Binene
- Theme music composer: Nonong Buencamino
- Opening theme: "Natutulog Ba ang Diyos?" by Jonalyn Viray and Jillian Ward
- Country of origin: Philippines
- Original language: Tagalog
- No. of episodes: 55

Production
- Executive producer: Nora Javellana
- Production locations: Montalban, Rizal, Philippines; Manila, Philippines
- Cinematography: Butch Maddul
- Editor: Jack Pilapil
- Camera setup: Multiple-camera setup
- Running time: 16–30 minutes
- Production companies: GMA Entertainment TV; GMA Films

Original release
- Network: GMA Network
- Release: October 22, 2012 – January 4, 2013

Cielo de Angelina (transl. heaven from Angelina / international title: Angelina's Sky) is a Philippine television drama series broadcast by GMA Network. Directed by Omar Deroca, it stars Bea Binene in the title role. It premiered on October 22, 2012 on the network's late morning line up. The series concluded on January 4, 2013, with a total of 55 episodes.

The series is streaming online on YouTube.

== Premise ==
The series follows the life and love of Angelina, an orphan girl who was left by the door of El Cielo Shelter for Destitute Women and Abandoned Children one stormy night. Marco, a four-year-old stowaway was there when Sister Margaret picked the baby. Because of being abandoned, Marco and Angelina treated the shelter as their home.

Through the years, Marco serves as the older brother of Angelina especially when her best friend, Julie was adopted. Since then, it was Marco who helped Angelina on her longing for Julie. It was also Marco who will help Angelina in trying to find out what was left by her parents when she was abandoned. But when Angelina tries to get the clue inside Sister Margaret's office, a fire breaks out in another part of the shelter causing the latter to die.

Separation ensued when Angelina was adopted and in turn leaving Marco in the orphanage. While Angelina is living a tormented life with her stepmother Czarina and stepsister Rhoda, Marco now acts very distant from her.

== Cast and characters ==
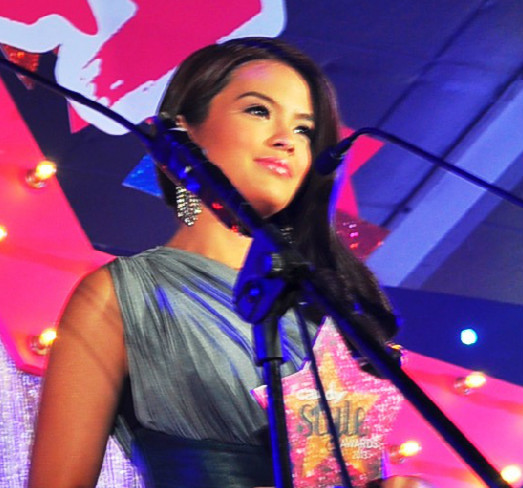
Bea Binene portrays Angelina Nantes.

=== Lead cast ===
- Bea Binene as Angelina Nantes

An orphan girl who was left on the doorstep of an orphanage run by nuns, one stormy night. There, she grows up with Marco, who also serves as her older brother. Marco also helps Angelina to search for her parents. But just as they were on to something, Angelina is adopted and thus begins her life of torment.

=== Supporting cast ===
- Jake Vargas as Marco Sevilla

When he was a little boy when he witnessed Angelina's arrival as a baby in El Cielo. Since then, he has acted as an older brother figure to her, especially when her best friend, Julie was adopted. He will soon find himself falling in love with Angelina. But under the circumstances, his love will remain undeclared and unrequited.

- Hiro Peralta as James Aragon
- Ashleigh Nordstrom as Marian "Julie" Dela Guardia
- Roxanne Barcelo as Elaine

A mother and a resident of El Cielo Shelter for Destitute Women and Abandoned Children. She rebuilds her life after being abandoned by her boyfriend with the help of Dr. Frank, her newfound love.

- Victor Basa as Frank Cordero
- Izzy Trazona-Aragon as Dena
- Debraliz Borres as Susan
- Baby O'Brien as Miriam "Mamer" Dela Guardia
- Yassi Pressman as Rhoda
- Gloria Romero as Sor Margaret

=== Guest cast ===
- Jillian Ward as younger Angelina
- Elijah Alejo as younger Julie
- Miggy Jimenez as younger Marco
- Jessa Zaragoza as Theresa Alfonso

A successful woman with a traumatic past. Despite her success and wealth, she feels that there's a big part of her life that is missing.

- Gerald Madrid as Benjamin "Benjie" Nantes
- Isabel Granada as Czarina

The scheming arch-enemy of the story. She is Benjie Nantes' vindictive mistress who will stop at nothing to get what she wants. She and her daughter, Rhoda will make life difficult for Angelina.

- Stephanie Sol as Perlita Zulueta
- Rina Reyes as Elena
- Kathleen Hermosa as Marilyn Nantes
- Vangie Labalan as Rosario
- Biboy Ramirez as Arnaldo
- Renz Valerio as Keith
- Lindt Johnston as Kelly
- Nicole Dulalia as Bernie
- Jolo Romualdez as Randy
- Maey Bautista as Simang
- Derick Lim as Elly
- Jak Roberto as Andrei
- Marco Masa as Marlon
- Andrea Brillantes as Bernadeth Nantes

== Development ==
Annette Gozon-Abrogar and Jose Mari Abacan came up with the idea to produce a light yet inspiring drama series intended for the network's morning timeslot, and to pit against the rival station's romantic-comedy series, as well. "It will be a test as to which genre between drama and comedy will really get public attentions," Abacan said. The production team began developing the storyline in July 2012, under the title Angelina del Cielo, with theme focusing on love, friendship, and family

== Production ==
Principal photography commenced on October 5, 2012, in Montalban, Rizal. Locations were chosen by the series’ production designer, Potchi Manda, due to the area's calmly and provincial-type surroundings.

== Music ==
The show used seven versions of the song throughout its run: the main theme, which was performed by Jonalyn Viray; duet versions of the song performed by Jillian Ward and Viray, and Ward and Bea Binene; solo versions of Binene, Jessa Zaragoza and Jake Vargas; and the trio version of song performed by Viray, Ward and Binene.

== Ratings ==
According to AGB Nielsen Philippines' Mega Manila household television ratings, the pilot episode of Cielo de Angelina earned an 11.8% rating. The final episode scored a 9.4% rating.
