= Super Twins =

2007 Philippine television drama series

- Title card
- Genre: Fantasy drama
- Written by: Dode Cruz; Kit Villanueva-Langit; Denoy Navarro-Punio
- Directed by: Dominic Zapata
- Starring: Jennylyn Mercado; Nadine Samonte; Ella Cruz; Nicole Dulalia
- Theme music composer: Michael V.
- Ending theme: "Alinlangan" by Jolina Magdangal
- Country of origin: Philippines
- Original language: Tagalog
- No. of episodes: 78

Production
- Executive producer: Edlyn Tallada-Abuel
- Editors: Ferdinand Panghulan; Ed Esmedia; Ver Custodio
- Camera setup: Multiple-camera setup
- Running time: 23–37 minutes
- Production company: GMA Entertainment TV

Original release
- Network: GMA Network
- Release: February 12 – June 1, 2007

Super Twins is a 2007 Philippine television drama fantasy series broadcast by GMA Network. Directed by Dominic Zapata, it stars Jennylyn Mercado, Nadine Samonte, Ella Cruz and Nicole Dulalia all in the title roles. It premiered on February 12, 2007, on the network's Telebabad line up. The series concluded on June 1, 2007, with a total of 78 episodes.

The series is streaming online on YouTube.

== Cast and characters ==
Cast

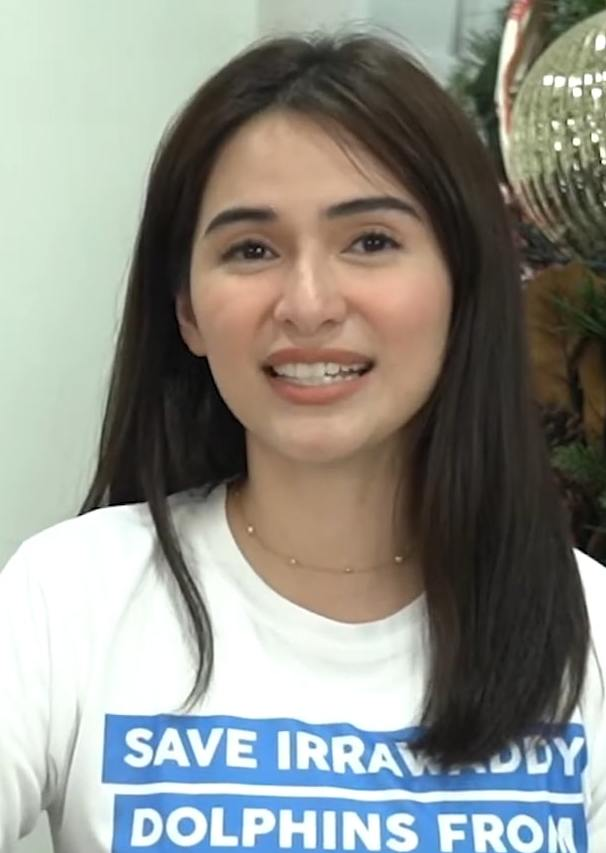
Jennylyn Mercado

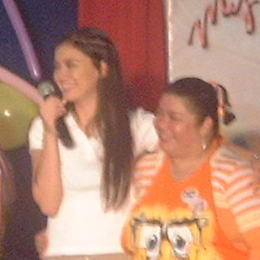
Nadine Samonte (left)

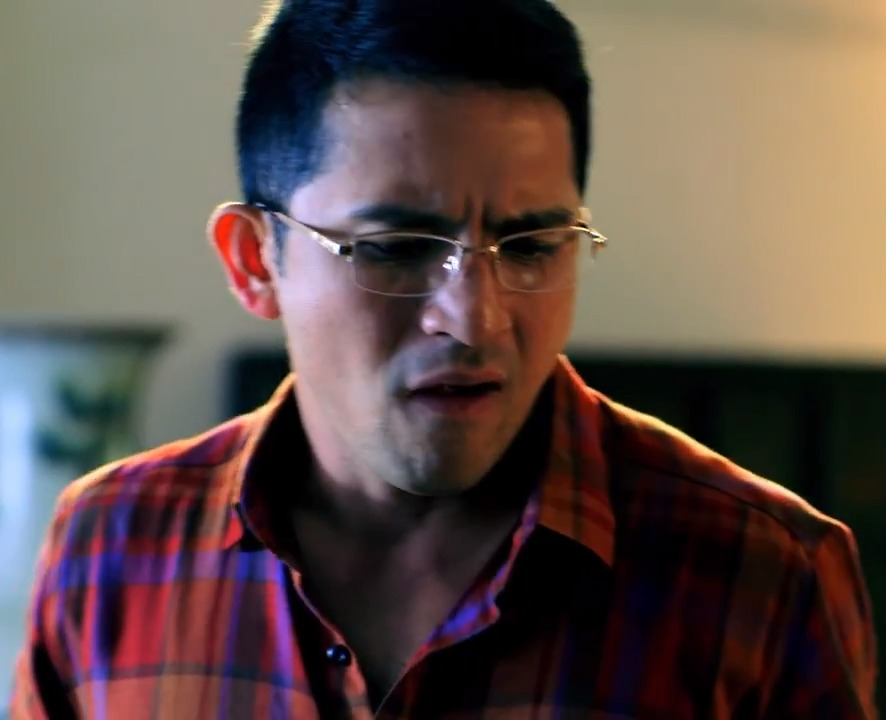
Dennis Trillo

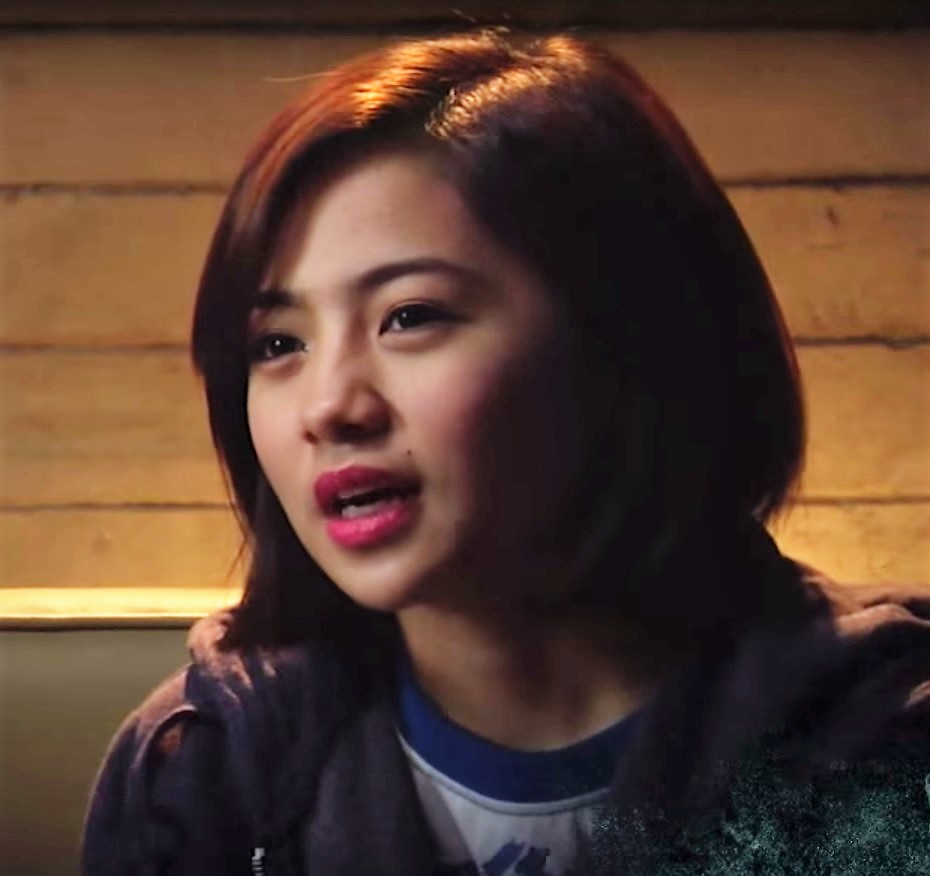
Ella Cruz

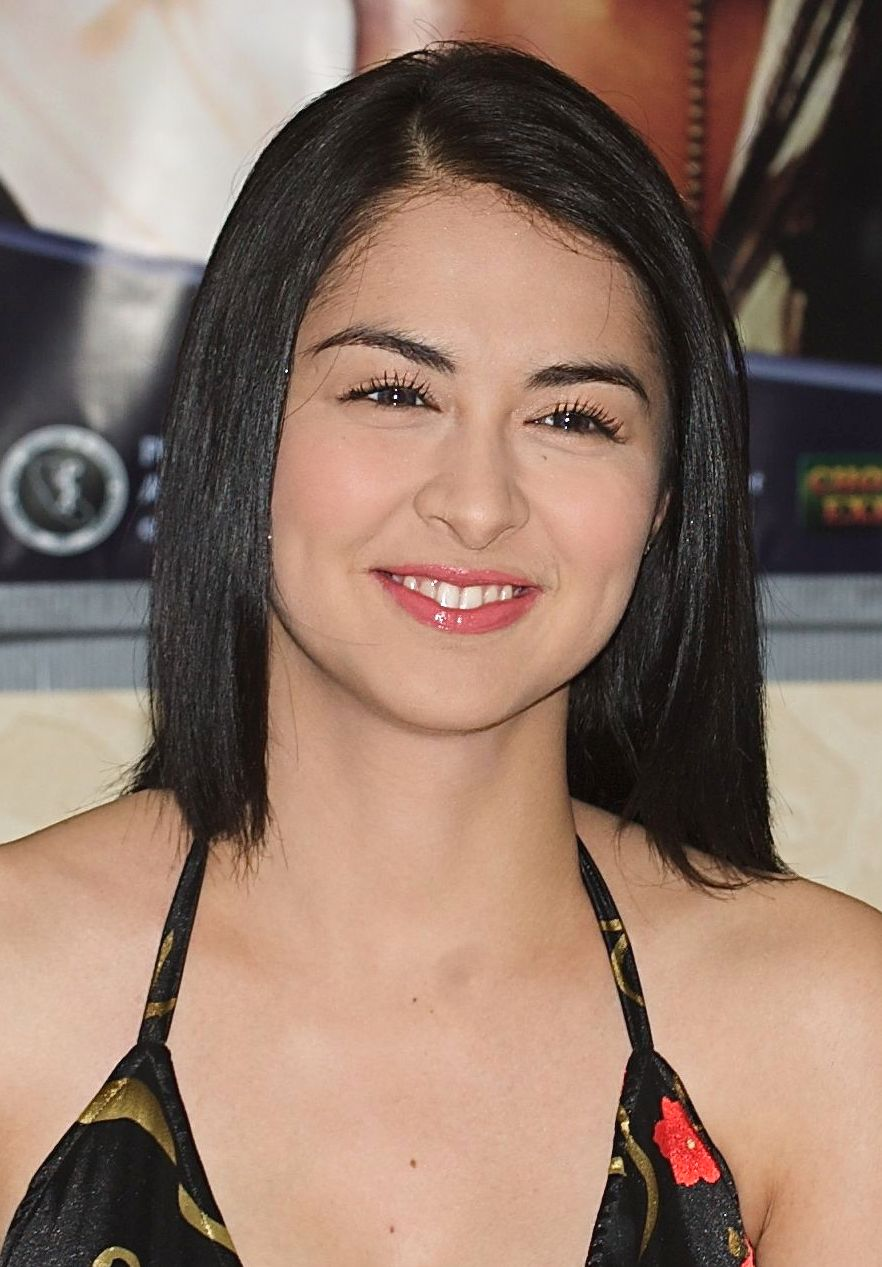
Marian Rivera

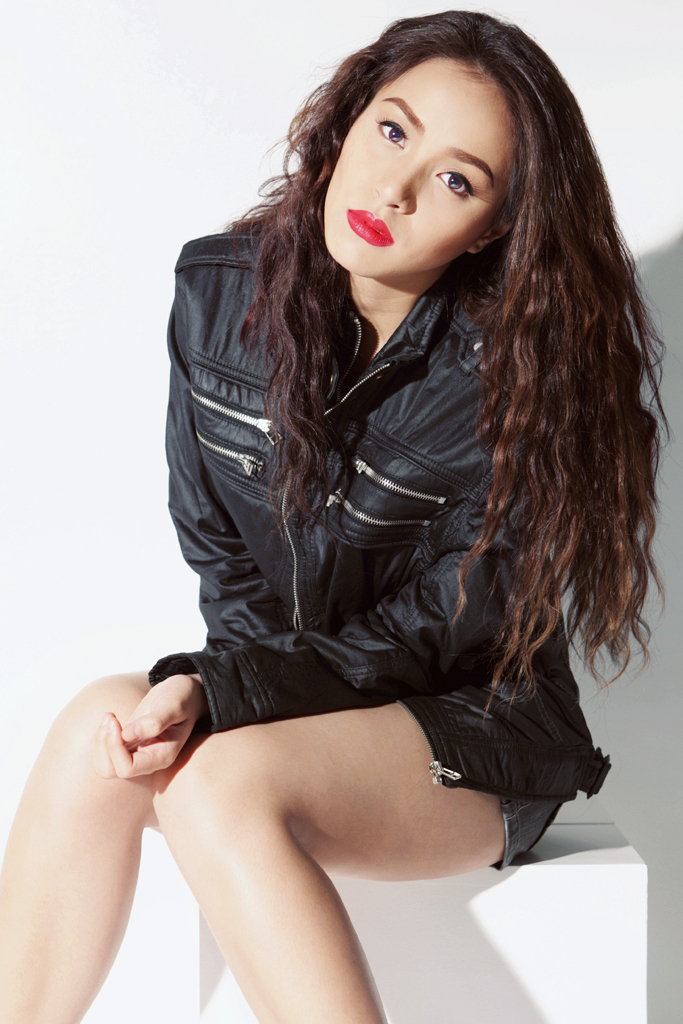
Cristine Reyes

Lead cast

- Jennylyn Mercado as Super S
- Nadine Samonte as Super T
- Ella Cruz as Tintin
- Nicole Dulalia as Shasha

Supporting cast

- Dennis Trillo as Eliazar and Eliseo Vergara
- Camille Prats as Drew Morales / Drew Barrymore / Drew Barrymorales
- Patrick Garcia as Billy Vergara
- Tetchie Agbayani as Vesta Paredes
- Ian De Leon as Manuel Paredes
- Tanya Garcia as Aloya Blossom
- Marian Rivera as Ester Paredes / Black Ester
- Luz Valdez as Ising
- Gabby Eigenmann as Rex / Steel Rex
- Cristine Reyes as Magnesia / Magdalene
- Dominic Roco as Ian
- Felix Roco as Lester
- Mura as Metallad
- John Feir as a policeman
- Robert Villar as Ding

Guest cast

- Antonio Aquitania as a policeman
- Sheena Halili as a reporter
- Bianca King as Katrina Roces
- Melissa Avelino
- Vivienne dela Cruz
- Iwa Moto as Monica / Moshi Moshi Manika
- Arief Yusmita
- Ryan Yllana as Candyman
- Rita Avila as Victoria
- Giselle Sanchez as Jakidaz
- Gene Padilla as Iniyuuuy
- Rey Pumaloy as Boboy Trumpo
- Mel Kimura as Jemma
- Alessandra De Rossi as Nickelina / Nickel
- Biboy Ramirez

== Production ==
Principal photography commenced on December 19, 2006.
