= Vince Gamad =

Filipino actor, model and host

- Born: Vincent Lorenz Gamad; January 15, 1994 (age 32); Manila, Philippines
- Occupations: Actor, model, TV host
- Years active: 2012-2018
- Known for: Walang Tulugan with the Master Showman
- Awards: 2012 Top Brand Awards Best New Male Model & TV host Championship (LSCD Street Megaran)

Vincent Lorenz Gamad (born January 15, 1994) is a Filipino actor, model and host. He is a host in Walang Tulugan with the Master Showman; hosts German Moreno, Sanya Lopez, Jak Roberto, Teejay Marquez and Hiro Peralta.

== Career ==
Gamad started his career and worked on GMA Network. He signed a contract in GMA Artist Center. In 2012 Gamad appeared as a host of Walang Tulugan with the Master Showman; in 2015 Gamad appeared in a GMA TV series Let the Love Begin as Erick's friend; in 2016 he portrayed Glenn on Juan Happy Love Story.

== Filmography ==
=== Television ===
Year	Title	Role
2020	Carpool	Rigo
2017-2018	Ika-6 na Utos	Chef Darwin
2018	Dear Uge: Poser You and I	Scarlet
2018	Victor Magtanggol	Victor's Friend
2018	Ang Forever Ko'y Ikaw	Aleli
2017	Mulawin vs. Ravena	Kalaw
2017	Magpakailanman: Justice for the Battered Child	Naldo
2017	Tsuperhero	Kargador Zombie
2017	Daig Kayo ng Lola Ko: Si Jessie at Dante Higante	Obet
2017	Meant To Be	Chef Dan
2016	Magpakailanman: #LoloKongProsti	Ferdie
2016	Juan Happy Love Story	Glenn
2016	Karelasyon: Bilin	Joseph's Friend
2016	Magpakailanman: Multo ni Ella	Nico
2016	URL: Usapang Real Love: Perfect Fit	Jose
2016	Oh, My Mama!	Marvin
2016	Magpakailanman: Mag Ama Sa Loob ng Bilanguan	Berting
2015	Magpakailanman: Preggy prosti	Mark
2012-2016	Walang Tulugan with the Master Showman	Himself / Performer
