= Center for Asian Culinary Studies =

Coordinates: 14.60787°N 121.03315°E

The Center for Asian Culinary Studies (CACS) is a non-stock, non-profit culinary school located in San Juan, Metro Manila, and in Davao City, Philippines. It was established in 2000 in Manila by Gene Gonzalez and in 2007, in Davao City. It is in consortium with the De La Salle-College of Saint Benilde.

It is the first culinary school in the Philippines to earn a Level IV accreditation in their Professional Program granted by the Technical Education and Skills Development Authority (TESDA). It is the only culinary school with this certificate in education.

== Notable people ==
- Pia Wurtzbach - Miss Universe 2015
- Bea Binene - Tween Hearts
