= Alice Bungisngis and Her Wonder Walis =

2012 Philippine television drama series

- Title card
- Also known as: Giggly Alice
- Genre: Comedy drama; Fantasy
- Developed by: Maribel Ilag
- Written by: Anna Nadela; Tina Samson-Velasco; Gilbeys Sardea
- Directed by: Mark A. Reyes
- Creative director: Jun Lana
- Starring: Bea Binene
- Theme music composer: Von de Guzman; Jobart Bartolome
- Opening theme: "Alice Bungisngis" by Frencheska Farr
- Country of origin: Philippines
- Original language: Tagalog
- No. of episodes: 88

Production
- Executive producer: Kaye Atienza-Cadsawan
- Producer: Wilma Galvante
- Production locations: Laguna; Tagaytay; Tanay, Rizal
- Cinematography: Jay Linao
- Camera setup: Multiple-camera setup
- Running time: 16–26 minutes
- Production company: GMA Entertainment TV

Original release
- Network: GMA Network
- Release: February 6 – June 8, 2012

Alice Bungisngis and Her Wonder Walis (transl. giggly Alice and her wonder broom / international title: Giggly Alice) is a 2012 Philippine television drama fantasy comedy series broadcast by GMA Network. Directed by Mark A. Reyes, it stars Bea Binene in the title role. It premiered on February 6, 2012 on the network's Telebabad line up. The series concluded on June 8, 2012, with a total of 88 episodes.

The series is streaming online on YouTube.

== Cast and characters ==
Cast

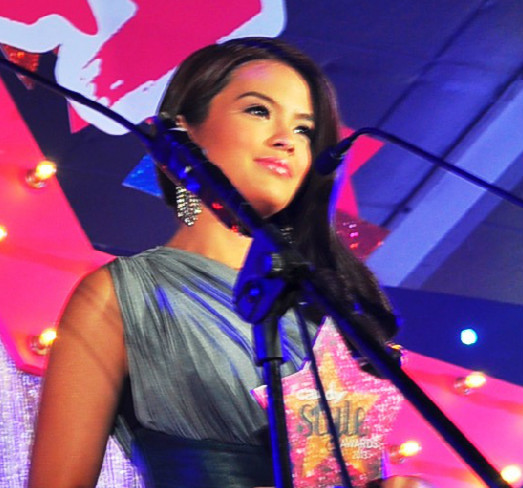
Bea Binene

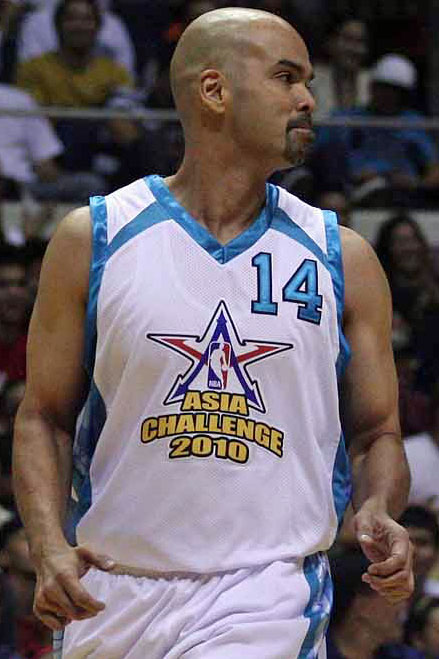
Benjie Paras

Lead cast

- Bea Binene as Alice Asuncion-Fernandez / Daisy Reyes

Supporting cast

- Jake Vargas as Ace Fernandez
- Derrick Monasterio as Spade Fernandez
- Lexi Fernandez as Queenie Delos Santos
- Jean Garcia as Esmeralda Reyes
- Janno Gibbs as Hilario Asuncion
- Sheena Halili as Sinag
- Buboy Garovillo as Filipe "Ipeng" Lucsin
- Benjie Paras as Timoteo / Tim
- Sef Cadayona as Tomas / Tom
- Irma Adlawan as Margarita "Maggie" Fernandez / Gareng Lucsin
- Alicia Alonzo as Andeng / old Matilda
- Marc Justin Alvarez as Wally
- Isabel Nesreen Frial as Gelay
- Lance Angelo Lucido as Ivan

Guest cast

- Marita Zobel as Alicia
- Roy Alvarez as Zaldy Fernandez
- Ana Roces as Matilda Asuncion
- Ama Quiambao as Anita
- Lovely Rivero as Panying
- Vangie Labalan as Belinda Kasimsiman
- Ellen Adarna as Carla
- Jana Trites as Doray
- Edgar Sandalo as Greg
- Rita Iringan as Wendy
- Nicole Dulalia as Lev
- Sabrina Man as Carol

== Ratings ==
According to AGB Nielsen Philippines' Mega Manila household television ratings, the pilot episode of Alice Bungisngis and Her Wonder Walis earned a 16.3% rating. The final episode scored a 14.1% rating.
