= Villa Quintana (2013 TV series) =

Philippine television drama series

- Title card
- Genre: Romantic drama
- Based on: Villa Quintana (1994) by R.J. Nuevas
- Written by: R.J. Nuevas; Leilani Chavez; Marlon Miguel
- Directed by: Gina Alajar
- Creative director: Jun Lana
- Starring: Elmo Magalona; Janine Gutierrez
- Theme music composer: Von de Guzman
- Opening theme: "Sa Villa Quintana" by Mark Bautista
- Ending theme: "Ikaw" by Rachelle Ann Go
- Country of origin: Philippines
- Original language: Tagalog
- No. of episodes: 153

Production
- Executive producer: Darling Pulido-Torres
- Camera setup: Multiple-camera setup
- Running time: 22–29 minutes
- Production company: GMA Entertainment TV

Original release
- Network: GMA Network
- Release: November 4, 2013 – June 6, 2014

Villa Quintana (transl. Quintana estate) is a Philippine television drama romance series broadcast by GMA Network. The series is based on a 1994 Philippine television drama series of the same title. Directed by Gina Alajar, it stars Janine Gutierrez and Elmo Magalona. It premiered on November 4, 2013, on the network's Afternoon Prime line up. The series concluded on June 6, 2014, with a total of 153 episodes.

The series is streaming online on YouTube.

== Premise ==
The series revolves around the love story of Isagani and Lynette, with family tensions driven from the past. Everything will change when Isagani's mother discovers a secret of the Lynette's family that will affect the fate of the relationship between Isagani and Lynette.

== Cast and characters ==
Cast

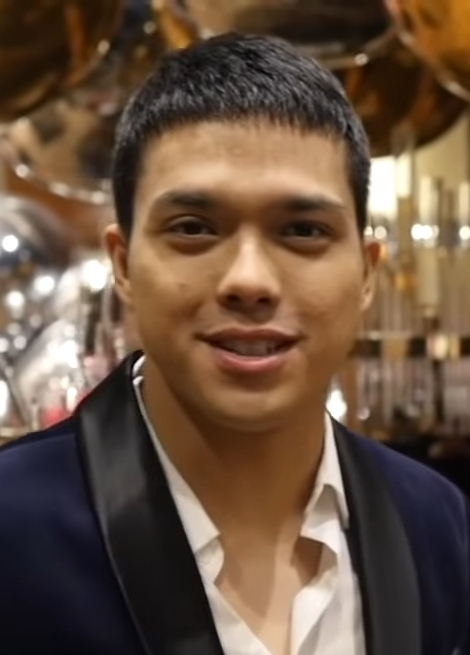
Elmo Magalona

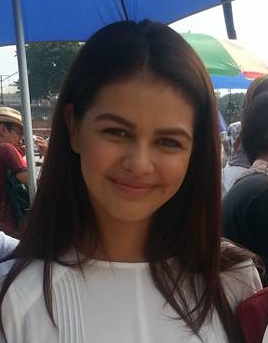
Janine Gutierrez

Lead cast

- Elmo Magalona as Isagani "Gani" Digos Quintana / Isagani Samonte
- Janine Gutierrez as Lynette Mendiola Quintana

Supporting cast

- Raymart Santiago as Felix Samonte
- Sunshine Dizon as Lumeng Digos-Samonte
- Paolo Contis as Robert Quintana
- Roy Alvarez and Al Tantay as Manolo Quintana
- Maricar de Mesa as Stella Mendiola-Quintana
- Tanya Garcia as Amparing Mangaron
- Kyla as Ruby Quintana
- Marky Lopez as Chito Quintana
- Juancho Trivino as Jason "Jace" Quintana
- Rita De Guzman as Patrice Mendiola Quintana

Guest cast

- Mona Louise Rey as younger Lynette
- Will Ashley de Leon as younger Isagani
- Carl Acosta as younger Jace
- Franchesca Salcedo as younger Patrice
- Dexter Doria as Pilar Digos
- Racquel Villavicencio as Amelia Samonte
- Rez Cortez as Alfonso Mendiola
- Anna Marin as Felicia Mendiola
- Francine Garcia as Kadyo / Megan
- Mikoy Morales as Boknoy
- Abel Estanislao as Miggy
- Shelly Hipolito as Joanne
- Nicole Dulalia as Snooky Mangaron
- Rhen Escaño as Eve
- Lucho Ayala as Noah Angeles
- Mara Alberto as Eden
- Joyce Ching as Crystal Almario
- Bettina Carlos as Janice
- Katya Santos as Linda Carillo
- Diva Montelaba as Yvette Carillo
- Ashley Cabrera as Janice's daughter

== Production ==
Principal photography commenced on October 7, 2013. Actor Roy Alvarez died on February 11, 2014. He was later replaced by Al Tantay.

== Ratings ==
According to AGB Nielsen Philippines' Mega Manila household television ratings, the pilot episode of Villa Quintana earned a 13.8% rating. The final episode scored a 15.1% rating.

== Accolades ==
Accolades received by Villa Quintana
Year	Award	Category	Recipient	Result	Ref.
2015	6th Golden Screen TV Awards	Outstanding Adapted Drama Program	Villa Quintana	Won	
