= Home Sweet Home (2013 TV series) =

2013 Philippine television drama series

- Title card
- Genre: Fantasy drama
- Developed by: R.J. Nuevas
- Written by: Jules Dan Katanyag; Lobert Villela; Ma. Cristina Velasco
- Directed by: Gil Tejada Jr.
- Creative director: Jun Lana
- Starring: Raymart Santiago; Roxanne Guinoo; Jake Vargas; Bea Binene; Jillian Ward
- Opening theme: "Home Sweet Home" by Jake Vargas, Bea Binene and Jillian Ward
- Country of origin: Philippines
- Original language: Tagalog
- No. of episodes: 64

Production
- Executive producer: Joy Lumboy-Pili
- Production locations: Bulacan, Philippines
- Cinematography: Lito Mempin
- Camera setup: Multiple-camera setup
- Running time: 30–45 minutes
- Production company: GMA Entertainment TV

Original release
- Network: GMA Network
- Release: April 22 – July 19, 2013

Home Sweet Home is a 2013 Philippine television drama fantasy series broadcast by GMA Network. Directed by Gil Tejada Jr., it stars Raymart Santiago, Roxanne Guinoo, Jake Vargas, Bea Binene and Jillian Ward. It premiered on April 22, 2013 on the network's Telebabad line up. The series concluded on July 19, 2013, with a total of 64 episodes.

The series is streaming online on YouTube.

== Premise ==
The series revolves around the Caharian family and their magical adventures and misadventures as they explore and unravel the mysteries behind an old and abandoned house. In the story, whoever enters the old house will be trapped inside and a fake version (a doppelganger with opposite personality of the real one) will come out.

== Cast and characters ==
Cast

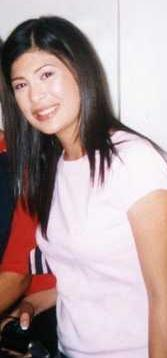
Roxanne Guinoo

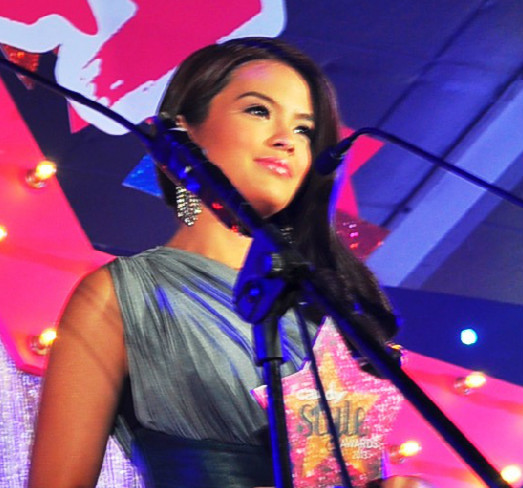
Bea Binene

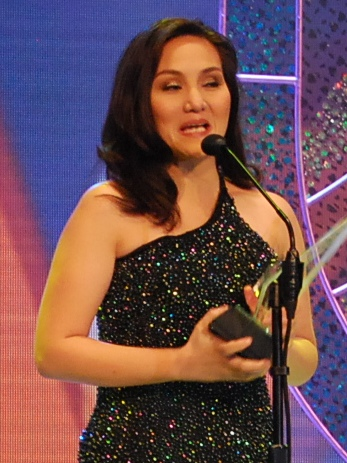
Gladys Reyes

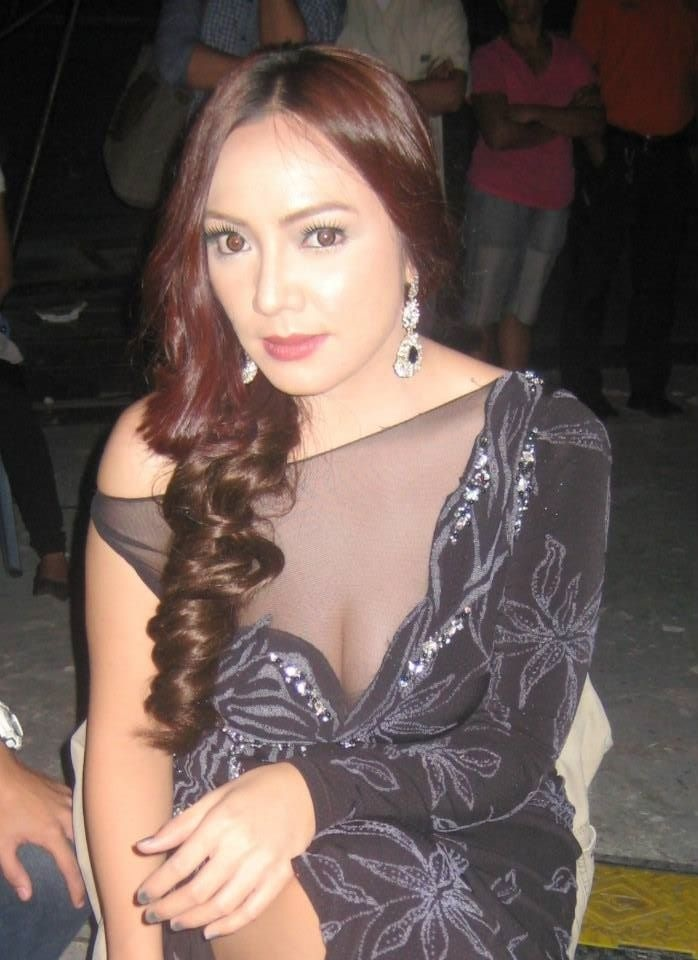
Shermaine Santiago

Lead cast

- Raymart Santiago as Reden Caharian
- Roxanne Guinoo as Dulce Caharian
- Jake Vargas as Benjie Caharian
- Bea Binene as Lucy Buena
- Jillian Ward as Jessie Caharian

Supporting cast

- Rain Quite as Ivan Caharian
- Celia Rodriguez as Pandora
- Gladys Reyes as Agoncilla Caharian
- Rochelle Pangilinan as Wendy del Valle
- Teejay Marquez as Coco Buena
- Shermaine Santiago as Dessa Buena
- Arthur Solinap and Patricia Ysmael as Kulay and Mikay
- Marky Lopez as Caloy
- Ernie Zarate as Duarte Caharian
- Ken Chan as Dane
- Buboy Villar as Django
- Arkin Magalona as Arko Buena
- Elle Ramirez as Chinggay

Guest cast

- Lorna Tolentino as Azon
- Gerald Madrid as Gabby Buena
- Ricky Davao as Manolo
- Dinkee Doo, Jr. as Sidyo
- Alessandra De Rossi as the Ice Queen
- Marita Zobel as a witch
- Juancho Triviño as Adonis
- Yassi Pressman as Ella

== Development ==
The series was conceptualized and developed by R.J. Nuevas in early March 2013. The series' working title was Bahay na Bato (transl. house of stone), before being changed to Home Sweet Home. According to GMA Network, the show was conceived as a child-friendly drama aimed at younger viewers, stating the series "actively promotes traditional Pinoy values and practices kids and adults alike can relate to."

The cast came first before the concept of the series. The first actor to be cast was Raymart Santiago who played Reden Caharian. Santiago stated he contributed creative input to make series better and asked his children to help him decide on the kind of role he would take in the [new] series. Roxanne Guinoo was chosen to play Dulce Caharian. Guinoo accepted the role because it's a mother role stating "I want to explore the idea of having grown up kids. And it's very light. My kids will also get to see the show."

== Reception ==
=== Ratings ===
According to AGB Nielsen Philippines' Mega Manila household television ratings, the pilot episode of Home Sweet Home earned a 10.5% rating. The final episode scored a 15.3% rating.

=== Critical response ===
Mario E. Bautista of Malaya stated Raymart Santiago's acting performance–"Raymart has become a very good actor as shown in his dual roles in Home Sweet Home. He plays two different characters... We think he deserves to be nominated as best actor in the coming TV awards for his performance in this show."

== Accolades ==
Accolades received by Home Sweet Home
Year	Award	Category	Recipient	Result	Ref.
2013	27th PMPC Star Awards for Television	Best Child Performer	Jillian Ward	Nominated	
