= First Time (TV series) =

2010 Philippine television drama series

- Title card
- Genre: Romantic drama
- Developed by: Kit Villanueva-Langit
- Directed by: Andoy Ranay
- Creative director: Jun Lana
- Starring: Barbie Forteza; Joshua Dionisio; Jake Vargas
- Opening theme: "First Love" by Rita Iringan
- Country of origin: Philippines
- Original language: Tagalog
- No. of episodes: 77

Production
- Executive producer: Joseph Buncalan
- Camera setup: Multiple-camera setup
- Running time: 19–30 minutes
- Production company: GMA Entertainment TV

Original release
- Network: GMA Network
- Release: February 8 – May 28, 2010

First Time is a 2010 Philippine television drama romance series broadcast by GMA Network. Directed by Andoy Ranay, it stars Barbie Forteza, Joshua Dionisio and Jake Vargas. It premiered on February 8, 2010 on the network's Telebabad line up. The series concluded on May 28, 2010, with a total of 77 episodes.

The series is streaming online on YouTube.

== Cast and characters ==
Cast

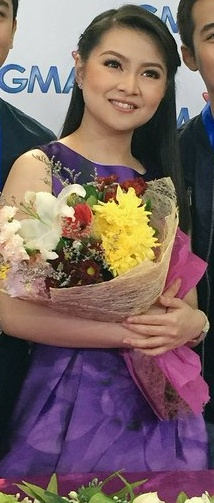
Barbie Forteza

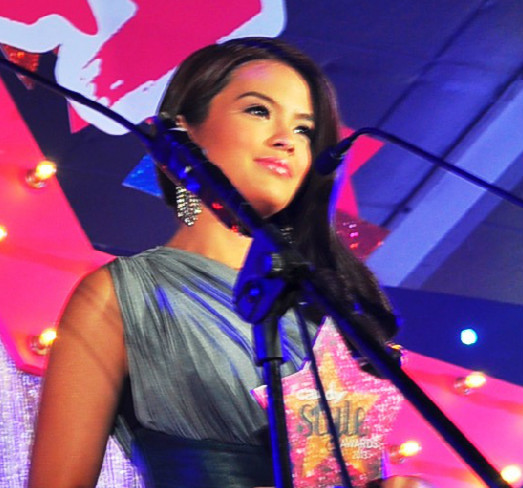
Bea Binene

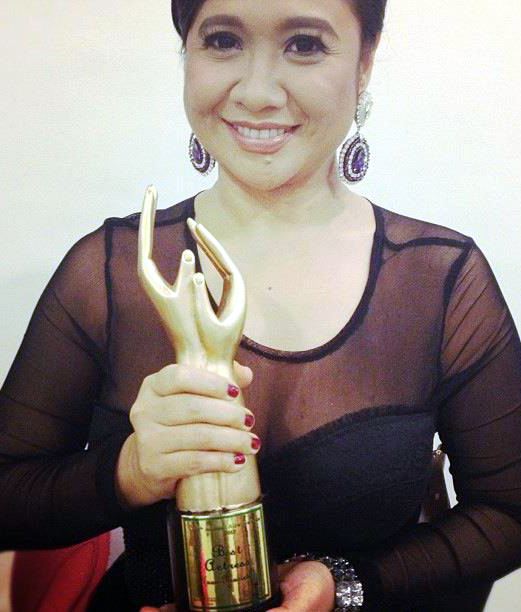
Eugene Domingo

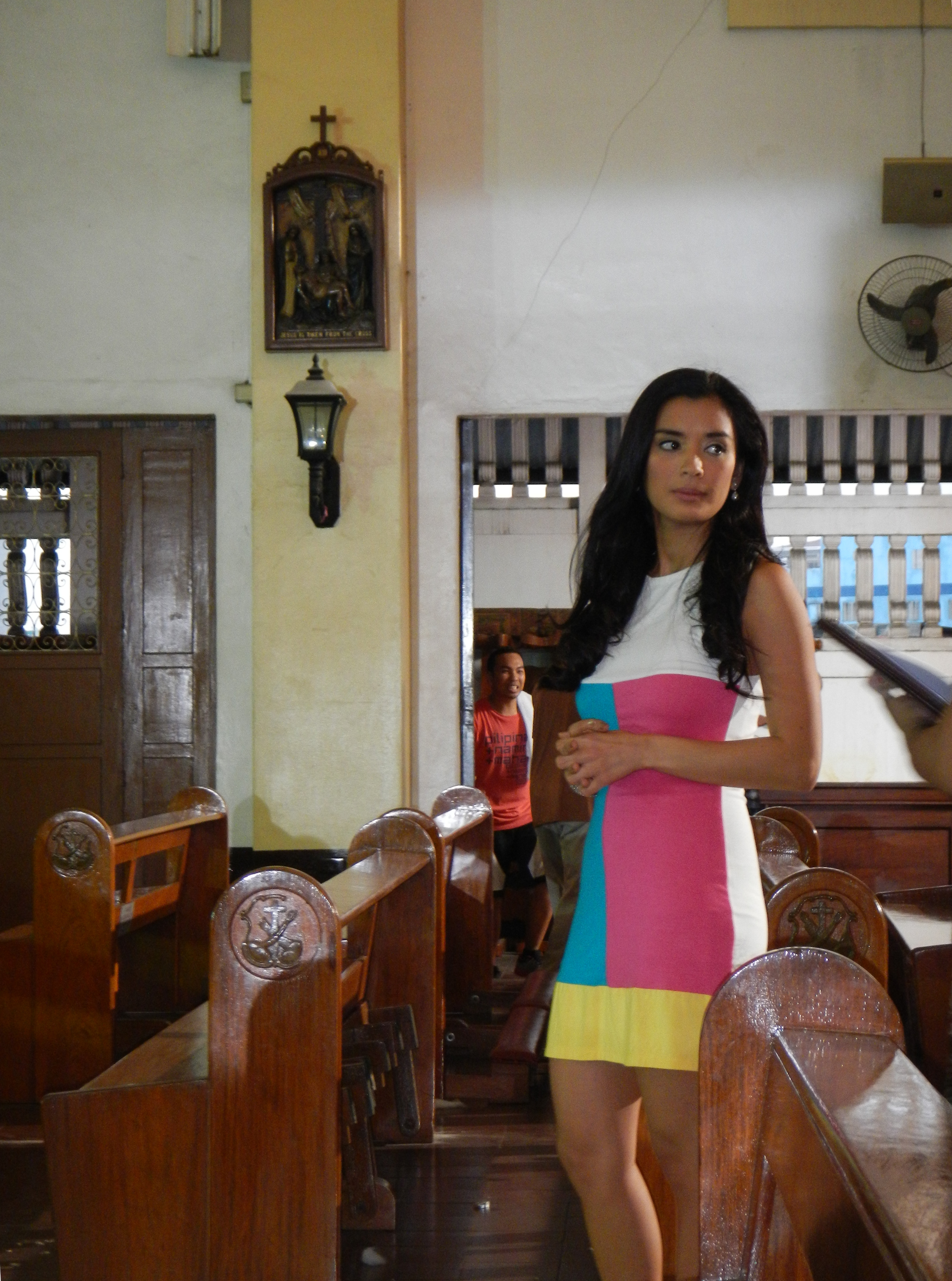
Michelle Madrigal

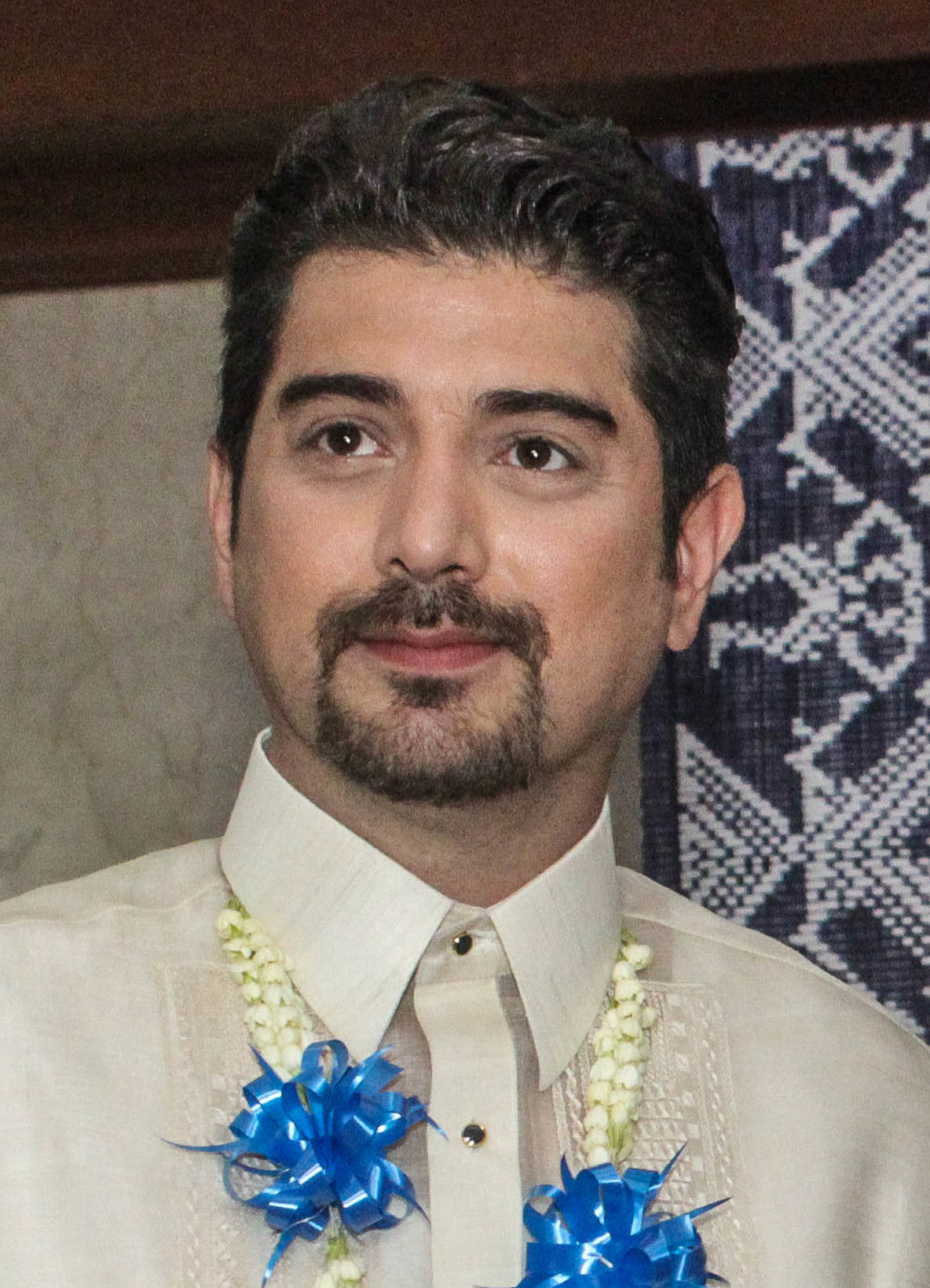
Ian Veneracion

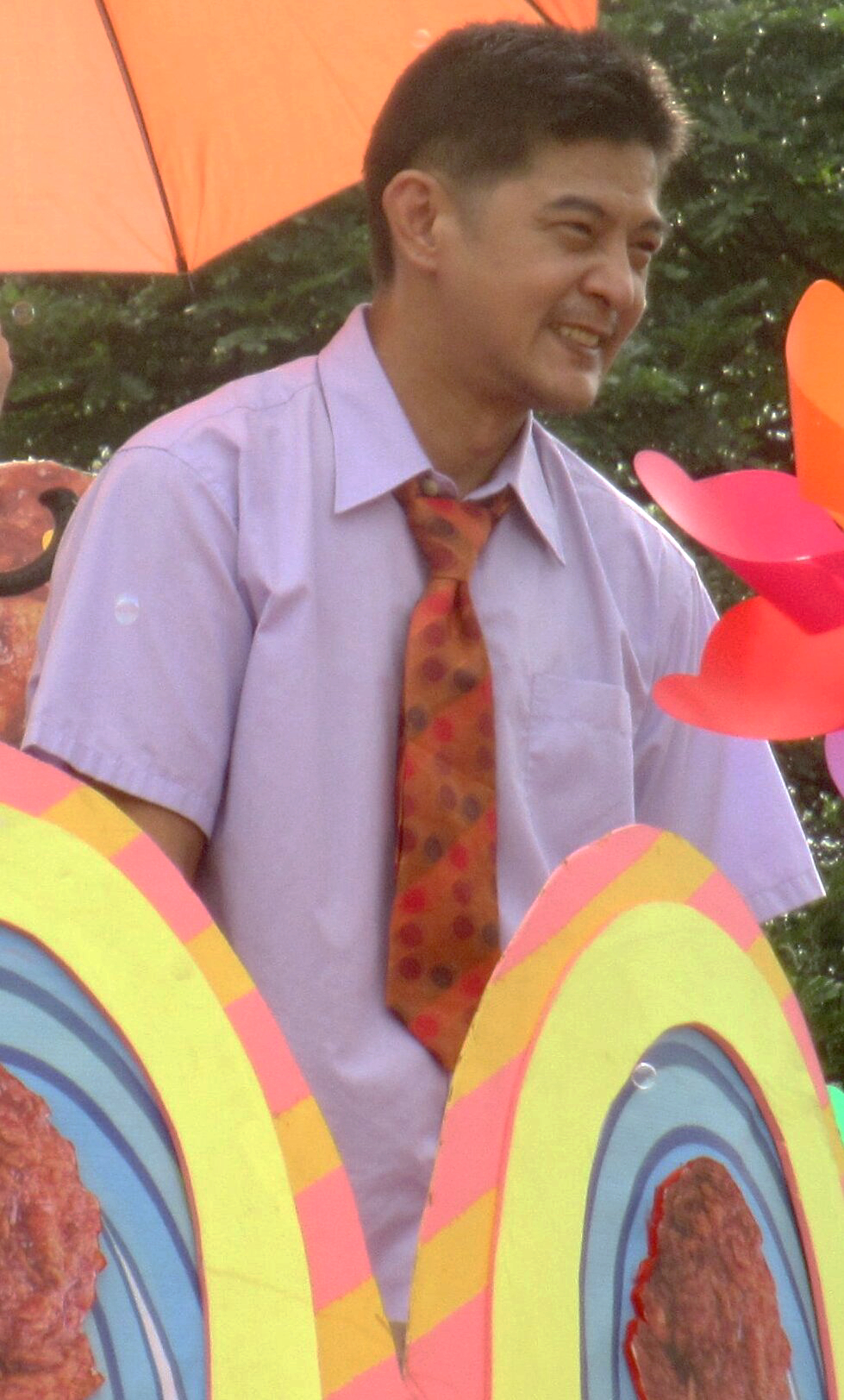
Romnick Sarmenta

Lead cast

- Barbie Forteza as Cyndi Gomez
- Joshua Dionisio as Lukas Ynfante
- Jake Vargas as Sebastian "Baste" Luna

Supporting cast

- Bea Binene as Natalie Dimaculangan
- Jhoana Marie Tan as Sara Santiago
- Lucho Ayala as Jimbo Dimaculangan
- Mark Elliot Castillo as Daniel Olivia
- Grace Henson as Patty Montalban
- Joyce Ching as Bea
- Mac Castillo as Nathan
- Eugene Domingo as Barbarella Buncalan Jackson
- Michelle Madrigal as Valeria Gomez
- Joross Gamboa as Ted
- Ian Veneracion as Robert Gomez
- Ana Capri as Hilda Gomez
- Cris Villanueva as Ben Gomez
- Angel Jacob as Olive Ynfante
- Eric Quizon as Jaime Ynfante
- Manilyn Reynes as Laura Luna
- Romnick Sarmenta as Marcelo "Marcel" Luna
- Bayani Agbayani as Raffy Santiago
- Shiela Marie Rodriguez as Doris Santiago
- Alicia Mayer as fake Ms. Dimaculangan
- Mel Kimura as Ida
- Ricci Chan as Pete
- Roxanne Barcelo as Berna
- Peter Serrano as Oh
- Harlene Bautista-Sarmenta as Teresa Chavez

Recurring cast

- Anna Vicente as Belle
- Carmi Martin as Ms. Dimaculangan
- Patrick Suelto as Josh Goretti
- Tricia Andrews as Hannah
- Emsi Nightmare as Mary Christine

== Production ==
Principal photography concluded in May 2010.

== Ratings ==
According to AGB Nielsen Philippines' Mega Manila household television ratings, the pilot episode of First Time earned a 22.5% rating.

== Controversy ==
On May 11, 2010, director of the series, Andoy Ranay reportedly insulted the cast member Jake Vargas during the production of the series. Vargas' then-manager, German Moreno, went to the set of the series and confronted Ranay.

== Home media release ==
The series was released on DVD by GMA Records.
