= Tsuperhero =

Philippine television sitcom series

- Title card
- Genre: Action; Sitcom
- Written by: Chito M. Francisco; Mike G. Rivera; Henry Maceda; Memot Navarro; Wystan Dimalanta; Wilson Araya
- Directed by: LA Madridejos; Rado Peru
- Creative directors: Michael V.; Caesar Cosme
- Starring: Derrick Monasterio
- Country of origin: Philippines
- Original language: Tagalog
- No. of episodes: 23

Production
- Executive producer: Erica D.V. De Leon
- Producer: Michael V.
- Camera setup: Multiple-camera setup
- Running time: 27–34 minutes
- Production company: GMA Entertainment TV

Original release
- Network: GMA Network
- Release: November 13, 2016 – April 23, 2017

Tsuperhero (transl. driver hero) is a Philippine television action sitcom series broadcast by GMA Network. Directed by LA Madrijeros and Rado Peru, it stars Derrick Monasterio in the title role. It premiered on November 13, 2016, on the network's Sunday Grande sa Gabi line up. The series concluded on April 23, 2017, with a total of 23 episodes.

The series is streaming online on YouTube.

== Premise ==
Nonoy, a jeepney driver turned superhero who has super strength and teleportation powers which came from an object, that came from the crashed spaceship of an alien from the planet Ganernia. Nonoy will eventually develops feelings for the barker Eva, and will eventually turn out to be his true love.

== Cast and characters ==
Cast

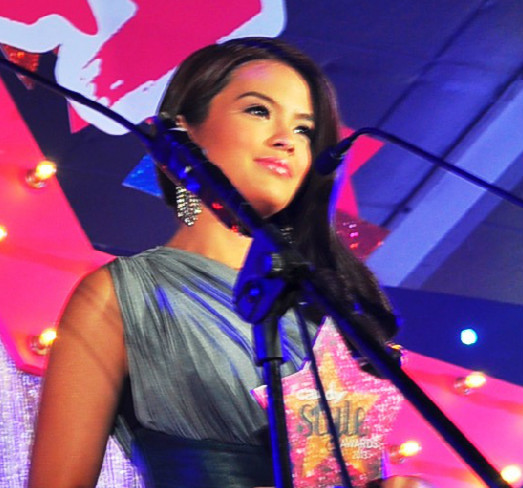
Bea Binene

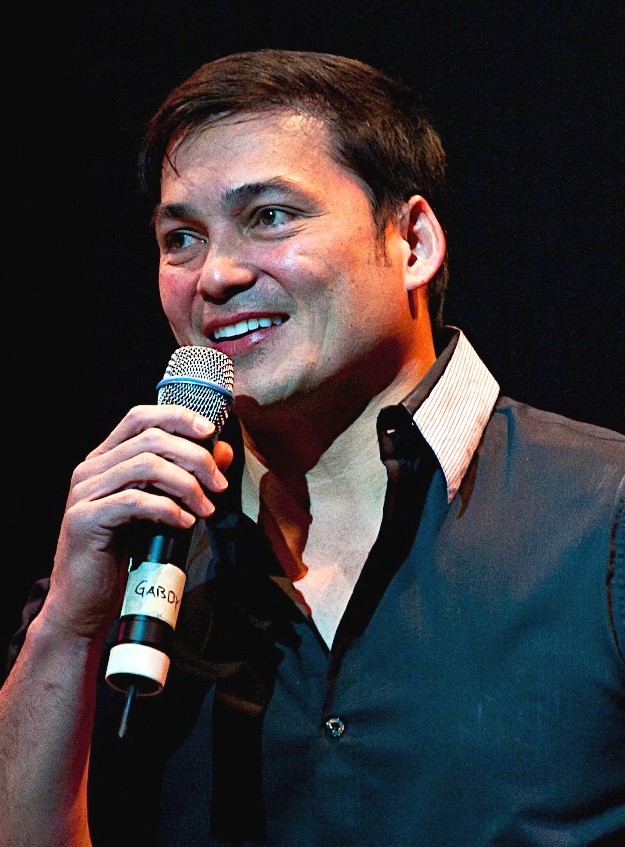
Gabby Concepcion

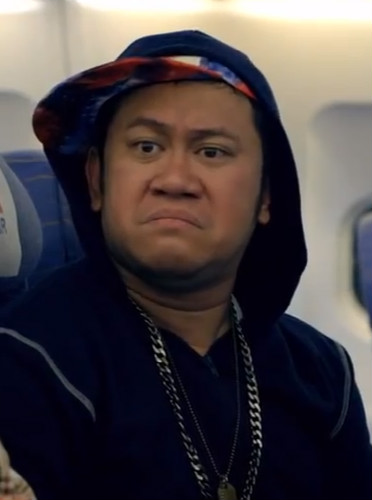
Betong Sumaya

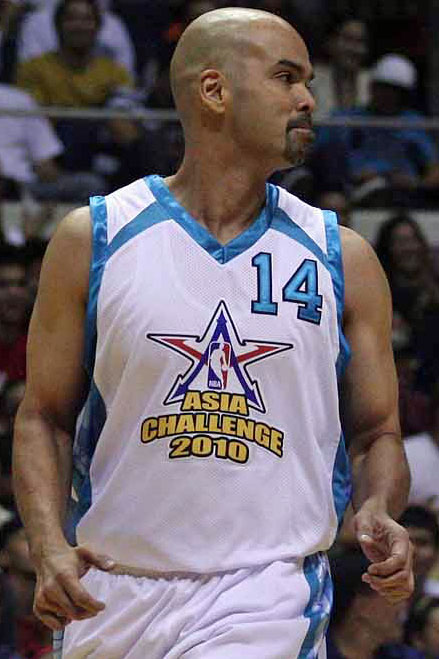
Benjie Paras

Lead cast

- Derrick Monasterio as Nonoy / Tsuperhero
- Bea Binene as Eva / Tsupergirl

Supporting cast

- Gabby Concepcion as Sergeant Cruz
- Alma Moreno as Martha
- Valeen Montenegro as Jennifer
- Andre Paras as Pedro
- Philip Lazaro as Pedi
- Analyn Barro as Anna
- Betong Sumaya as Julius
- Jemwell Ventinilla as Choy
- Valentin as Polding
- Kuhol as Barker/Maku
- Gardo Versoza as Apo Amasam
- Miggs Cuaderno as Bokutox / Bok
- Benjie Paras as Makutox / Maku
- Rhian Ramos as Espie / Espirikitik
- Ina Raymundo as Bakite
- Gabby Eigenmann as Markano
- Terry Gian as Katipar
- Jacob Briz as Totorox
- Symon De Leña as Iskobotox
- Lexter Capili as Tom Tox
- David Remo as Kokorokotox

Guest cast

- Lou Veloso as Taong Grasa
- Arianne Bautista as Pinky Salcedo
- Juancho Triviño as Obet / Thunder Man
- Liezel Lopez as Isa
- Archie Adamos as Manager
- Ryan Yllana as Henry / Killer Clown
- Kim Belles as Daisy
- Lucho Ayala as Estong / Buhawi
- Kim Domingo as Erica / Ice Queen
- Rodjun Cruz as Ricky
- Mikael Daez as Han / Han Hangin
- Martin del Rosario as Cellphone Man
- John Feir as Andy
- Diego Llorico as Tikboy Kutsero
- Epy Quizon as Lamparaz
- Jeric Gonzales as Dannilo
- Michael Angelo as Samuel
- Pen Medina as Pikoy / Piccololo
- Jerald Napoles as Boy Takatak
- JC Tiuseco as Ahmed
- Ken Anderson as Budoy
- Katrina Halili as Gloria
- Vince Gamad as Kargador Zombie
- Rolando Inocencio as Kiko
- Erlinda Villalobos as Ising
- Jake Vargas as Demitri
- Kim Idol as Kanor
- Will Devaughn as Enchanted Tom

== Ratings ==
According to AGB Nielsen Philippines' Mega Manila household television ratings, the pilot episode of Tsuperhero earned a 22.7% rating. The final episode scored a 6.5% rating in Nationwide Urban Television Audience Measurement People in television homes.

== Accolades ==
Accolades received by Tsuperhero
Year	Award	Category	Recipient	Result	Ref.
2017	31st PMPC Star Awards for Television	Best Horror/Fantasy Program	Tsuperhero	Nominated	
