= Oh, My Mama! =

2016 Philippine television drama series

- Title card
- Genre: Drama
- Based on: Oh, My Mama! (1981)
- Written by: Luningning Ribay; Christine Novicio; Onay Sales
- Directed by: Neal del Rosario; Patrick Ferrer; Jocelyn Palaypay
- Creative director: Roy Iglesias
- Starring: Inah de Belen
- Opening theme: "Oh, My Mama!" by David Remo, Jake Vargas and Raffy Calicdan
- Country of origin: Philippines
- Original language: Tagalog
- No. of episodes: 55

Production
- Executive producer: Joy Lumbay-Pili
- Producer: Acor Linaban Ignacio
- Production locations: Quezon City, Philippines
- Cinematography: Patrick Ferrer
- Camera setup: Multiple-camera setup
- Running time: 23–39 minutes
- Production company: GMA Entertainment TV

Original release
- Network: GMA Network
- Release: September 19 – December 2, 2016

Oh, My Mama! is a 2016 Philippine television drama series broadcast by GMA Network. The series is based on a 1981 Philippine film of the same title. Directed by Neal del Rosario, it stars Inah de Belen in the title role. It premiered on September 19, 2016 on the network's Afternoon Prime line up. The series concluded on December 2, 2016, with a total of 55 episodes.

The series is streaming online on YouTube.

== Premise ==
Maricel finds out that the father she recognized isn't her biological father which will lead to her finding her biological father. She will later end up in a syndicate and stay to know her father. She will also know Peewee, Bayani, Bimbo, Berto and Nicole, kids who works for the syndicate in a sweatshop. Maricel and the kids will escape from the sweatshop and Maricel will serve as a mother figure to the kids.

== Cast and characters ==
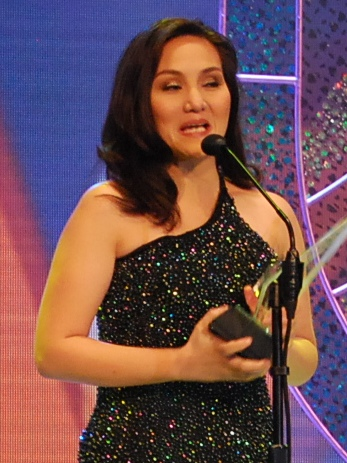
Gladys Reyes portrays Inday Bartolome.

Lead cast

- Inah de Belen as Maricel "Mama Cel" Domingo Reyes

Supporting cast

- Epy Quizon as Gordon Domingo
- Jake Vargas as Julio Sta. Ana
- Jeric Gonzales as Zach Ynares
- Gladys Reyes as Inday Bartolome
- Ryan Eigenmann as Efren Ynares
- Gilleth Sandico as Anita
- Yul Servo as Robert Reyes
- Sheree Bautista as Patricia Ynares
- Jenny Miller as Sabrina Cruz
- Arthur Solinap as Rick Rosales
- Eunice Lagusad as Sara Bartolome
- Ashley Ortega as Ariana Gutierrez
- Phytos Ramirez as Justin Gutierrez
- Teri Malvar as Peewee Reyes
- David Remo as Empoy Guevarra-Reyes
- Jhiz Deocareza as Bayani Salcedo
- Bryce Eusebio as Bimbo Domingo-Salcedo
- Sofia Pablo as Nicole Pangilinan

Guest cast

- Sheryl Cruz as Julia Domingo-Reyes
- Eva Darren as Sta. Maria
- Victor Harry as younger Gordon
- Beatriz Imperial as younger Julia
- Elle Ramirez as Linda
- Analyn Barro as Miley
- Luz Fernandez as Conchita
- Dang Cruz as Lourdes
- Shiela Marie Rodriguez as Carmi
- Alchris Galura as Gary
- Vince Gamad as Marvin
- Jenny Cruz as Lily
- Jayzelle Suan as Aa

== Ratings ==
Oh, My Mama! ratings
No.	Original air date	AGB Nielsen Ratings Urban Luzon Households Television Homes
1	September 19, 2016	13.0%
2	September 20, 2016	10.4%
3	September 21, 2016	10.3%
4	September 22, 2016	11.7%
5	September 23, 2016	12.4%
6	September 26, 2016	12.6%
7	September 27, 2016	12.4%
8	September 28, 2016	13.4%
9	September 29, 2016	12.6%
10	September 30, 2016	13.1%
11	October 3, 2016	10.8%
12	October 4, 2016	11.0%
13	October 5, 2016	11.9%
14	October 6, 2016	11.7%
15	October 7, 2016	12.6%
16	October 10, 2016	10.8%
17	October 11, 2016	12.0%
18	October 12, 2016	12.4%
19	October 13, 2016	11.9%
20	October 14, 2016	12.7%
21	October 17, 2016	12.9%
22	October 18, 2016	12.8%
23	October 19, 2016	12.9%
24	October 20, 2016	16.5%
25	October 21, 2016	13.4%
26	October 24, 2016	13.7%
27	October 25, 2016	13.6%
28	October 26, 2016	14.1%
29	October 27, 2016	13.4%
30	October 28, 2016	14.4%
31	October 31, 2016	11.2%
32	November 1, 2016	12.8%
33	November 2, 2016	13.8%
34	November 3, 2016	12.5%
35	November 4, 2016	14.5%
36	November 7, 2016	12.3%
37	November 8, 2016	12.2%
38	November 9, 2016	12.9%
39	November 10, 2016	12.5%
40	November 11, 2016	14.0%
41	November 14, 2016	11.6%
42	November 15, 2016	13.9%
43	November 16, 2016	13.9%
44	November 17, 2016	13.1%
45	November 18, 2016	12.9%
46	November 21, 2016	11.7%
47	November 22, 2016	12.6%
48	November 23, 2016	10.8%
49	November 24, 2016	11.0%
50	November 25, 2016	13.5%
51	November 28, 2016	10.9%
52	November 29, 2016	11.0%
53	November 30, 2016	11.6%
54	December 1, 2016	11.4%
55	December 2, 2016	13.0%

== Production ==
Principal photography concluded in November 2016.
