= Jake Vargas =

Filipino actor (born 1992)

- Born: Jhake Angelo Cunanan Vargas; July 9, 1992 (age 33); Olongapo, Philippines
- Occupations: Actor; musician
- Years active: 2008–present
- Agents: German Moreno (2008–2016); Sparkle GMA Artist Center (2008–present)
- Height: 5 ft 4 in (163 cm)
- Musical career
- Label: Dyna

Jhake Angelo Cunanan Vargas (born July 9, 1992) is a Filipino actor and musician. He began his career as a cast member of the variety show Walang Tulugan with the Master Showman before rising to prominence through his roles in Reel Love Presents Tween Hearts (2010), Pepito Manaloto (2011–present), and Alice Bungisngis and Her Wonder Walis (2012). He also appeared in films such as Tween Academy: Class of 2012 (2011), My Kontrabida Girl (2012), and Asintado (2014).

For his performance in Asintado, Vargas won the rising star award at the WorldFest-Houston International Film Festival and was nominated for Best Actor at the 2015 FAMAS Awards, and Movie Supporting Actor of the Year at the 2015 PMPC Star Awards for Movies.

== Career ==
Vargas commenced his career in 2008 after being discovered by television presenter German Moreno, who subsequently served as his talent manager. He then joined the cast of the variety show Walang Tulugan with the Master Showman, where he stayed for six years. In February 2010, he landed his first lead role in the television drama series First Time alongside Bea Binene. In September, he gained wider recognition after joining the ensemble cast of youth-oriented television series Reel Love Presents Tween Hearts as Jacob Vergara. In August 2011, he became part of the main cast in the teen comedy film adaptation Tween Hearts: Class of 2012 as Jepoy. That same year, he appeared in episode roles on the television anthology series Maynila. In September, he took on the role of Luke Velasco in the drama series Pahiram ng Isang Ina. In December, he further gained recognition for his role as Chito Manaloto in the sitcom series Pepito Manaloto, starring alongside Michael V., Manilyn Reynes, and Angel Satsumi. In January 2012, he joined the cast of the fantasy series Alice Bungisngis and Her Wonder Walis as Ace Fernandez, again with Bea Binene. In March, he appeared in the romantic comedy film My Valentine Girls, alongside Rhian Ramos, Aljur Abrenica, and Bea Binene. In October, he joined the supporting cast of the television drama series Cielo de Angelina, portraying Marco Sevilla. In December, he continued making episode roles in the anthology series Magpakailanman. He then joined the lead cast of the 2013 drama fantasy series Home Sweet Home as Benjie Caharian and later appeared in the supporting cast of the 2014 drama series Strawberry Lane as Gabriel "Gabo" Valentino.

Following the success of his early projects, Vargas transitioned to more mature and diverse roles, appearing in drama series such as Buena Familia (2015) as Kevin Acosta Vergara, Oh, My Mama! (2016) as Julio Sta. Ana, Encantadia (2016–2017) as Gilas, Ika-5 Utos (2018) as Carlo Manupil, and Ang Dalawang Ikaw (2021) as Lucas Javier. In 2022, he appeared as young Mark in a guest role in the drama series The Fake life.

In addition to acting, Vargas is a musician and singer. He released a self-titled album in 2010.

== Filmography ==
=== Film ===
Year	Title	Role	Notes	Ref.
2009	Litsonero	Itok	Supporting role	
2009	Patient X	James	Supporting role	
2010	Si Agimat at Si Enteng Kabisote	Udoy	Extended cast; 36th Metro Manila Film Festival entry	
2011	Tween Academy: Class of 2012	Jeremy / Jepoy	Main role	
2011	Ang Panday 2	Hamil	Supporting role; 37th Metro Manila Film Festival entry	
2012	My Kontrabida Girl	Poy	Main role	
2012	Delusyon	Teenage drug addict		
2014	Asintado (Between the Eyes)	Tonio	Main role; 10th Cinemalaya Independent Film Festival entry	
2015	Liwanag sa Dilim	Niko	Lead role	
2015	Bahay Ampunan		Lead role	

=== Television ===
Year	Title	Role	Notes	Ref.
2008–2016	Walang Tulugan with the Master Showman	Himself (performer)		
2008	Joaquin Bordado	Baloy		
2008	Gagambino	Peter's son		
2009	Sine Novela: Dapat Ka Bang Mahalin?	Elmer Ramos		
2009	Stairway To Heaven	young Tristan		
2009–2010	SOP Fully Charged	Himself (performer)		
2010	First Time	Sebastian "Baste" Luna		
2010	Ilumina	Eliseo Montero		
2010–2013	Party Pilipinas	Himself (performer)		
2010–2012	Reel Love Presents Tween Hearts	Jacob Vergara		
2011	Captain Barbell	Alden / Spin		
2011	Pahiram ng Isang Ina	Luke Velasco		
2011–present	Pepito Manaloto	Chito Manaloto		
2012–2013	Cielo de Angelina	Marco Sevilla		
2012	Alice Bungisngis and her Wonder Walis	Ace Fernandez		
2013	The Ryzza Mae Show	Himself (guest)		
2013	Home Sweet Home	Benjie Caharian		
2013–2015	Sunday All Stars	Himself (performer)		
2014–2015	Strawberry Lane	Gabby "Gabo" Valentino		
2015	The Ryzza Mae Show	Himself (guest)		
2015	Buena Familia	Kevin Acosta		
2015	Beautiful Strangers	Aldrin Frestame		
2016	Laff Camera Action	Himself (presenter)		
2016	Lip Sync Battle Philippines	Himself (contestant)	Episode: "Jake Vargas vs. Ken Chan"	
2016	Oh, My Mama!	Julio Sta. Ana		
2017	Encantadia	Gilas		
2018	All-Star Videoke	Himself (contestant)		
2018	Kambal, Karibal	Darren Olivar		
2018–2019	Ika-5 Utos	Carlo Manupil		
2021	Ang Dalawang Ikaw	Lucas Javier		
2022	The Fake Life	young Mark	Special participation	

Anthology performances
Year	Title	Role	Notes	Ref.
2009	Dear Friend	Otep	Episode: "My Christmas List"	
2011	Spooky Nights	Himself	Episode: "Bahay ni Lolo: A Very Spooky Night"	
2011–2018	Maynila	Luke	Episode: "Affairs of the Past"	
2011–2018	Maynila	Ed	Episode: "Biyaheng Puso"	
2011–2018	Maynila	Andrew	Episode: "I Love You and I Know It"	
2011–2018	Maynila	Tonix	Episode: "Txtm8, Luvm8"	
2011–2018	Maynila	King	Episode: "Prinsesa ng Pag-ibig"	
2011–2018	Maynila	Anton	Episode: "Music and Miracles"	
2011–2018	Maynila	Lucky	Episode: "Bagong Taon, Bagong Puso"	
2011–2018	Maynila	Kenjie	Episode: "GF for Rent"	
2011–2018	Maynila	Reggie	Episode: "Love Pretends"	
2011–2018	Maynila	Migo	Episode: "Scared to Love"	
2011–2018	Maynila	Jeric	Episode: "Love by Blood"	
2011–2018	Maynila	Kent	Episode: "Wrong Text"	
2011–2018	Maynila	Lyndon	Episode: "Hope for a New Life"	
2012–2017	Magpakailanman	John Edric	Episode: "Sa likod ng mga ngiti: The Stories of John Edric Ulang and Jaylord Casino"	
2012–2017	Magpakailanman	Jam Sebastian	Episode: "One Last Chance: The Jam and Michelle Story"	
2012–2017	Magpakailanman	Alvin	Episode: "Kapatid sa Ina: The Jason Delgado and Alvin Fontanilla Story"	
2012–2017	Magpakailanman	Jeyrick Sigmaton	Episode: "Ang Real Carrot Man: The Jeyrick Sigmaton Story"	
2012–2017	Magpakailanman	Jon	Episode: "I Will Follow You: The Popular Story of Jon Gutierrez and Jelai Andres"	
2016	Dear Uge	Marvin	Episode: "Ang lihim ni Kelly"	
2017	Tsuperhero	Baste	Episode: "Ex Problems"	
2017	Wagas	Emerson	Episode: "Ang Boyfie kong Beki"	
2018	Daig Kayo ng Lola Ko	Jack	Episode: "Si Jack at ang Mahiwagang Beanstalk"	
2019	Stories for the Soul	Jessie	Episode: "Bespren"	

== Discography ==
=== Studio album ===
Album	Tracks	Year	Records
Ngiti	"Ngiti" (First Time – TV Soundtrack); "Kahit Umiwas Pa" (Dong Yi – TV Soundtrack); "Basta't Kasama Kita" (Secret Garden – TV soundtrack); "Miss You Like Crazy"; "When I Look into Your Eyes"; "Maghihintay Sa'yo" (The Baker King – TV soundtrack); "Sana'y Ako Na Lang"; "Can Be Mine"; "Kiss Me, Kiss Me"; "Ngiti" (Acoustic)	2010	Dyna Records

== Awards and nominations ==
Jake Vargas
Year	Association	Category	Work	Result	Ref.
2010	58th FAMAS Awards	German Moreno Youth Achievement Award	—N/a	Won	
2011	3rd PMPC Star Awards for Music	New Male Recording Artist	Ngiti	Won	
2011	Gingtong Kabataan Awards	Special Citation	—N/a	Won	
2012	32nd Seal of Excellence, Dangal ng Bayan People's Choice Awards	Best Inspiring Male Young Celebrity	—N/a	Won	
2012	43rd Guillermo Mendoza Memorial Scholarship Foundation Box Office Entertainment Awards	Most Promising Loveteam for Movies & TV (shared with Bea Binene)	—N/a	Won	
2012	32nd Huwarang Ina Award	Most Outstanding Male Teleserye Artist	—N/a	Won	
2013	33rd Seal of Excellence Awards	Outstanding Young Actor	—N/a	Won	
2013	15th Gawad PASADO Awards	PinakaPASADOng Dangal ng KABATAAN	—N/a	Won	
2014	Yahoo! Celebrity Awards	Celebrity Couple of the Year (shared with Bea Binene)	—N/a	Won	
2015	WorldFest-Houston International Film Festival	Rising Star	Asintado	Won	
2015	63rd FAMAS Awards	Best Actor	Asintado	Nominated	
2015	31st PMPC Star Awards for Movies	Movie Supporting Actor of the Year	Asintado	Nominated	
2015	Eastwood City Walk Of Fame Philippines	Celebrity Inductee Winner	—N/a	Won	
