= Lucho Ayala =

Filipino actor

- Born: Eduard Francis Ayala; March 28, 1992 (age 34); Tuguegarao, Cagayan, Philippines
- Occupation: Actor
- Years active: 2008–present
- Spouse: Emma Rueda (m. 2022)
- Children: 1

Eduard Francis Ayala (born March 28, 1992), professionally known as Lucho Ayala, is a Filipino actor who made his debut on GMA network's First Time and made a remarkable appearance on the fantasy series Indio when he played young Juancho Sanreal.

== Personal life and career ==
In April 2022, Ayala married Emma Rueda at Blue Moon Los Ilustrados in Silang, Cavite and in December 2024, they had one child, Adri.

In July 2022, Napoles opened his Tah-Mee Frozen Yogurt store in Timog, Quezon City.

== Filmography ==
=== Television series ===
Year	Title	Role
2010	First Time	Jimbo Dimaculangan
2010	Endless Love	young Jojo Cruz
2010	Sine Novela: Mars Ravelo's Basahang Ginto	Benjie
2011	Elena M. Patron's Blusang Itim	Edward Escote
2012	One True Love	Troy Sandoval
2013	Indio	young Juancho Sanreal
2013	Binoy Henyo	Jaime Sandoval
2013	Kahit Nasaan Ka Man	John
2014	Villa Quintana	Noah Angeles
2014	Ilustrado	Jose Alejandrino
2015	Let the Love Begin	Edison
2015	Healing Hearts	Jimboy
2016	Magkaibang Mundo	Ricky
2016	Alyas Robin Hood	Councilor Paras
2016	A1 Ko Sa 'Yo	Paolo
2017	Legally Blind	John Castillo
2017	Tsuperhero	Estong / Buhawi
2017	Pepito Manaloto	Dodong
2017–2018	Super Ma'am	Adonis
2018	Hindi Ko Kayang Iwan Ka	Rommel
2018	The One That Got Away	Popoy
2018	Victor Magtanggol	Timothy Ferdinand "Tim" Corona
2019	Cain at Abel	Roel
2020	Descendants of the Sun	Staff Sergeant Alen Eugenio (a.k.a. Snoopy)
2021	The Lost Recipe	Benedict Napoleon
2021–2022	Las Hermanas	Ronald De Guzman
2022	Lolong	Victor
2023	Maria Clara at Ibarra	Abraham "Ben-Zayb" Ibañez
2023	Black Rider	Carlo
2024	Lilet Matias: Attorney-at-Law	young Constantino de Leon
2024–2025	Forever Young	Julio Mariano

=== Television anthologies ===
Year	Title	Role
2022	Imbestigador: Caloocan City murder case	Jefferlon Amigan
2019	Imbestigador: 1-Year Old Rape-Slay Case	Gerald Riparip
2019	Tadhana: Libya	Dizhwar
2019	Imbestigador: Sinimento	Crisanto Martinez
2019	Wagas: Oplan Sinta	Amir
2019	Dear Uge: Yayo Aguilar	Bok
2019	Wish Ko Lang!: Anak (A Reunion Story)	Nestor
2019	Wagas: Sa Gitna ng Unos	Randy
2019	Magpakailanman: Arrest My Son's Rapist	Jacob D. Ababa
2019	Imbestigador: Rebulto	Carille John "John-john" Capute
2018	Imbestigador: Chikay	Gilbert San Juan
2018	Imbestigador: Traysikel	Enrique Sonza
2018	Wagas: Pag-ibig ang Magpapalaya	Arnold
2018	Wish Ko Lang!: Lubag Syndrome	Rollie
2018	Imbestigador: Serial Rapist?	James Narte
2018	Daig Kayo ng Lola Ko: The Adventures of Laura Patola and Duwen-ding	Nitoy
2018	Maynila: Blood Brothers	Jericho
2018	Tadhana: Torture	Najib
2018	Imbestigador: Mag-Ama	Arnel Aguilar
2018	Daig Kayo ng Lola Ko: Ibong Adarna	Pedro
2018	Wagas: Love After HIV	Joe
2018	Wish Ko Lang!: Nanay Vilma	Anthony
2018	Imbestigador: Raz Alfaro Murder Case	Shannon Buckley
2018	Magpakailanman: Ang Babaeng Tinimbang Ngunit Sobra (The Melinda Mara Story)	Jero
2017	Wish Ko Lang!: Si Aileen at si Alexa	Regi
2017	Imbestigador: Sako	Ernesto "Ernie" Cruz"
2017	Wish Ko Lang!: Yakap ni Nanay	Michael
2017	Tadhana: Bilanggo	Migs
2017	Wish Ko Lang!: Lalaking Kumadrona	Goryo
2016	Imbestigador: Kapitan	

=== Films ===
Year	Title	Role	Production
2010	Mamarazzi	Lloyd	Regal Films
2011	Agawan Base		LEB Telon
2014	Kamkam (Greed)	Lennon	Heaven's Best Entertainment/GMA Films
