= My Kontrabida Girl =

- Theatrical release poster
- Directed by: Jade Castro
- Screenplay by: Jade Francis Castro; Aloy Adlawan
- Produced by: Jose Mari Abacan
- Starring: Rhian Ramos; Aljur Abrenica; Bea Binene; Jake Vargas
- Cinematography: Pao Orendain
- Edited by: Jeremiah V. Domingo
- Music by: Owel Alvero
- Production company: GMA Films
- Distributed by: GMA Films
- Release date: March 14, 2012
- Running time: 119 minutes
- Country: Philippines
- Languages: Filipino; English
- Box office: US$743,991

My Kontrabida Girl (My Antagonist Girl or My Villain Girl) is a 2012 Filipino romantic comedy film written and directed by Jade Castro. It stars Rhian Ramos, Aljur Abrenica, Bea Binene and Jake Vargas.

The film's story centers on the life of a famous soap opera antagonist and her funny and heart-warming quest in finding her one true love.

== Plot ==
Isabel Reyes (Rhian Ramos) is an infamous soap opera villain in the country. Everyone simply loathes Isabel which makes her the most condemned personality in the world of television.

But by some weird twist of fate, Isabel's life turns upside down when she encounters a near-death accident. The wicked antagonist experiences a sudden change of heart and being the top kontrabida of her soap opera, Isabel couldn't just deliver her heartlessness and cruelty in front of the camera. Her over-the-top villainous persona disappears and she finds herself powerless to kick and slap the lead star.

Isabel's show hits a major ratings slump and the network advises her to take a break from work with hopes of reigniting her passion. To solve her dilemma, Isabel seeks the help of the biggest kontrabida icon in the country, no less than Ms. Bella Flores. She finds her on YouTube and says that for Isabel to get herself back, she needs to find the person who hurt her the most. And that person for Isabel is Chris Bernal (Aljur Abrenica).

Isabel sets off to meet Chris who is still living in the same town where she left him many years back when she was a child. As they navigate their way through romance and heartbreak, will it further sabotage Isabel's career and their chances for a relationship?

As Isabel and Chris revisit their past, Isabel re-evaluates her feelings for him and begins to fall in love with him again, despite their previous breakup. The narrative follows their attempts to reconcile and overcome timing obstacles in their relationship.

== Cast ==
=== Main cast ===
- Rhian Ramos as Isabel Reyes
- Aljur Abrenica as Chris Bernal
- Bea Binene as Joyce Bernal
- Jake Vargas as Poy

=== Supporting cast ===
- Chariz Solomon as Charity
- Bella Flores as herself
- Gwen Zamora as Mariana
- Bela Padilla as Evelyn
- Enzo Pineda as Enzo
- Ken Chan as JC
- Kevin Santos as Kevin
- Sef Cadayona as Dex
- Odette Khan as Aunt Marot
- Allan Paule as Ishmael Bernal
- Lolit Solis as Mother Lilet
- James Macasero as Mang Andoy
- Ronald Macasero as Steven
- Sabina Santiago as Danica Delmundo
- Al Tantay as Mr. Delmundo

=== Special guests ===
- Bianca Umali as Teen Isabel
- Richard Dean as Teen Chris
- Almira Muhlach as Diane (Isabel's mother)
- Lloyd Samartino as Isabel's father
- Jim Libiran as the Director
- Julie Anne San Jose
- Cherie Gil
- Celia Rodriguez
- Gladys Reyes
- Louise delos Reyes
- German Moreno
- Rocco Nacino
- Tiya Pusit

== Theme song ==
The movie theme song "Ang Aking Puso" (My Heart) is composed by Janno Gibbs (and also included to his album "ORIG" under GMA Records) and sung by tween stars Julie Anne San Jose and Derrick Monasterio.

== Release ==
=== Local release ===
The film was released in Philippine theaters nationwide on March 14, 2012, and had a total of 3 weeks of screen time in these theaters.

=== International release ===
The lead stars, Rhian Ramos and Aljur Abrenica, in their appearance in a Philippine Independence Day celebration in San Diego, CA, hinted that the movie might be screened internationally, making it the 2nd Filipino film to be commercially released in cinemas abroad, following GMA Films' The Road, although no confirmations have been made by the management of GMA Network nor its distribution partner, Freestyle Releasing.

=== Critical response ===
The Cinema Evaluation Board gave My Kontrabida Girl a grade of B. It received mixed to negative reviews from local movie critics. Rito Asilo of Philippine Daily Inquirer mentions the movie's flaws but admits audiences can "have a hearty laugh." Abby Mendoza of Philippine Entertainment Portal commented that My Kontrabida Girl is a better comedy than it is a romantic film but its really confused when it comes to another scenes.

=== Box office ===
According to Box Office Mojo, My Kontrabida Girl's opening week gross amounted to P6.7 million nationwide. At the end of its third week, the movie's total gross amounted to US$743,991 nationwide.
