= The Fake Life =

2022 Philippine television drama series

- Title card
- Genre: Romantic drama
- Written by: Loi Argel Nova; Christine Novicio; Onay Sales-Camero
- Directed by: Adolf Alix Jr.
- Creative director: Aloy Adlawan
- Starring: Beauty Gonzalez; Ariel Rivera; Sid Lucero
- Opening theme: "Kakapitan" by Jennie Gabriel
- Country of origin: Philippines
- Original language: Tagalog
- No. of episodes: 79

Production
- Executive producer: James Ryan L. Manabat
- Camera setup: Multiple-camera setup
- Running time: 22–28 minutes
- Production company: GMA Entertainment Group

Original release
- Network: GMA Network
- Release: June 6 – September 23, 2022

The Fake Life is a 2022 Philippine television drama romance series broadcast by GMA Network. Directed by Adolf Alix Jr., it stars Beauty Gonzalez, Ariel Rivera and Sid Lucero. It premiered on June 6, 2022 on the network's Afternoon Prime line up. The series concluded on September 23, 2022, with a total of 79 episodes.

The series is streaming online on YouTube.

== Cast and characters ==
Cast

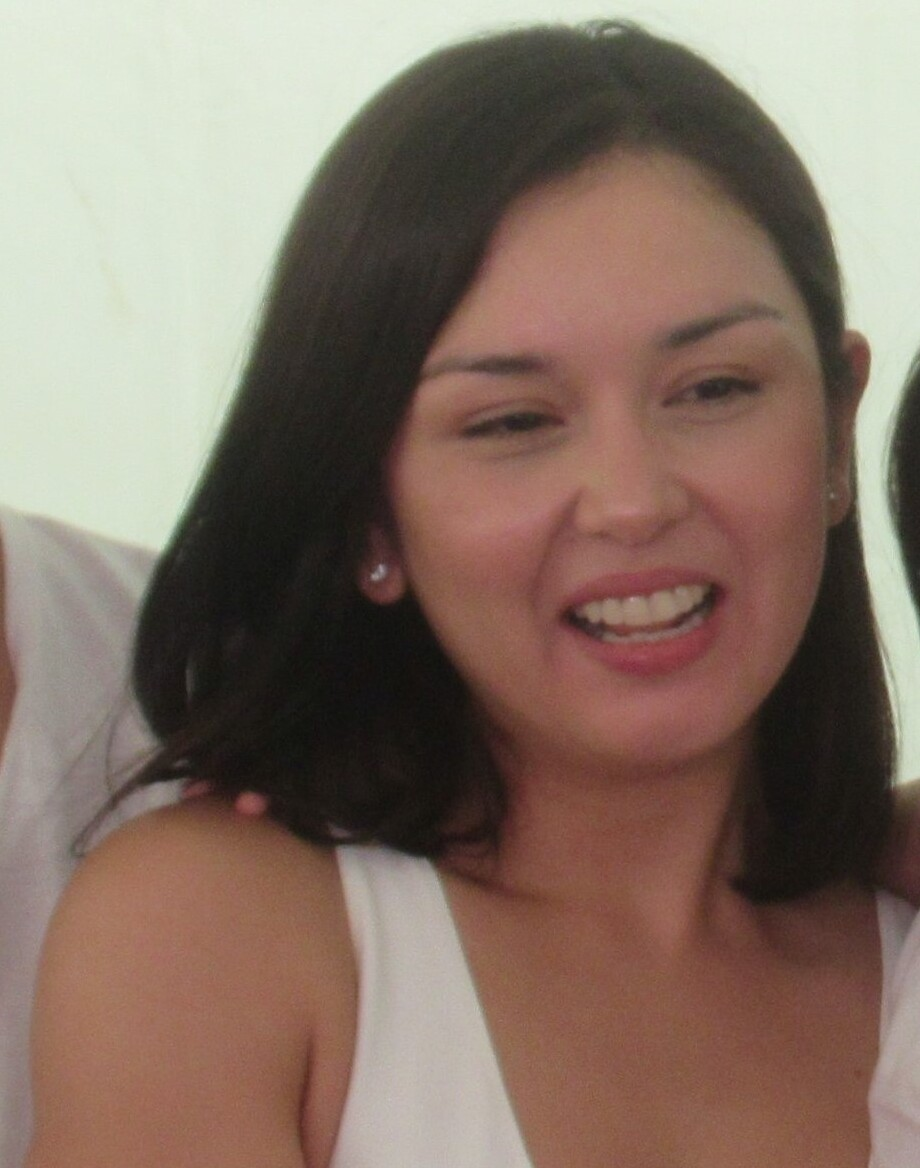
Beauty Gonzalez

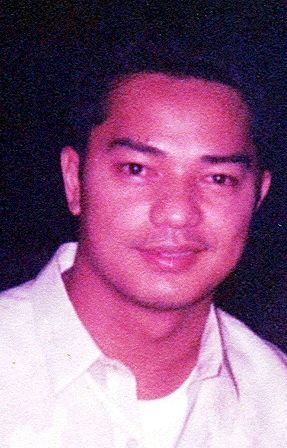
Ariel Rivera

Lead cast

- Beauty Gonzalez as Cindy Villamor
- Ariel Rivera as Onats Villamor
- Sid Lucero as Mark Santiaguel

Supporting cast

- Will Ashley as Peter Luna
- Shanelle Agustin as Jaycie Villamor
- Carlos Dala as Jonjon Villamor
- Tetchie Agbayani as Sonya De Guzman
- Faye Lorenzo as Jai
- Jenny Miller as Margaux Nova
- Rina Reyes as Jean Luna
- Saviour Ramos as Caloy Luna
- Bryan Benedict as Benson

Guest cast

- Bea Binene as younger Cindy
- Jake Vargas as younger Mark
- Kristoffer Martin as younger Onats
- Candy Pangilinan as younger Sonya
- Michael Rivero as Ernesto Luna

== Production ==
Principal photography commenced in March 2022.

== Ratings ==
According to AGB Nielsen Philippines' Nationwide Urban Television Audience Measurement People in television homes, the pilot episode of The Fake Life earned a 6% rating. The final episode scored a 9.1% rating.
