= Pahiram ng Isang Ina =

2011 Philippine television drama series

- Title card
- Also known as: Lend Me a Mom
- Genre: Drama
- Written by: Denoy Navarro-Punio; Renato Custodio; Onay Sales; John Borgy Danao
- Directed by: Joel Lamangan
- Creative director: Jun Lana
- Starring: Bea Binene; Carmina Villarroel
- Theme music composer: Jobart Bartolome; Arnel de Pano
- Opening theme: "Maari Ba Kitang Maging Ina" by Joshua Pineda
- Country of origin: Philippines
- Original language: Tagalog
- No. of episodes: 65

Production
- Executive producer: Carolyn Galve
- Camera setup: Multiple-camera setup
- Running time: 30–45 minutes
- Production company: GMA Entertainment TV

Original release
- Network: GMA Network
- Release: August 15 – November 11, 2011

Pahiram ng Isang Ina (transl. borrow of one mom / international title: Lend Me a Mom) is a 2011 Philippine television drama series broadcast by GMA Network. Directed by Joel Lamangan, it stars Bea Binene and Carmina Villarroel. It premiered on August 15, 2011, as part of the network's Dramarama sa Hapon lineup. The series concluded on November 11, 2011, with a total of 65 episodes.

== Cast and characters ==
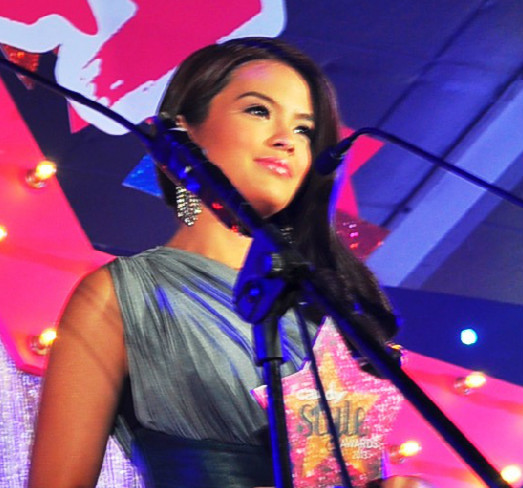
Bea Binene portrays Bernadette Cortez.

Lead cast

- Carmina Villarroel as Emily Martinez
- Bea Binene as Bernadette "Berna" Martinez

Supporting cast

- Martin Delos Santos as Andoy Martinez
- Jake Vargas as Luke Velasco
- Maxene Magalona as Andrea Martinez
- Marco Alcaraz as Ryan Perez
- Antonio Aquitania as Johnny Velasco
- Bubbles Paraiso as Eloisa Delos Santos
- Chynna Ortaleza as Sophia
- Jim Pebanco as Karyo
- Tony Mabesa as Carlos
- Rita Iringan as Nenet
- Shyr Valdez as Veron
- Mike Magat as Egay

== Ratings ==
According to AGB Nielsen Philippines' Mega Manila household television ratings, the pilot episode of Pahiram ng Isang Ina earned a 14.4% rating. The final episode scored a 21.7% rating.
