= Bea Binene =

Filipino actress

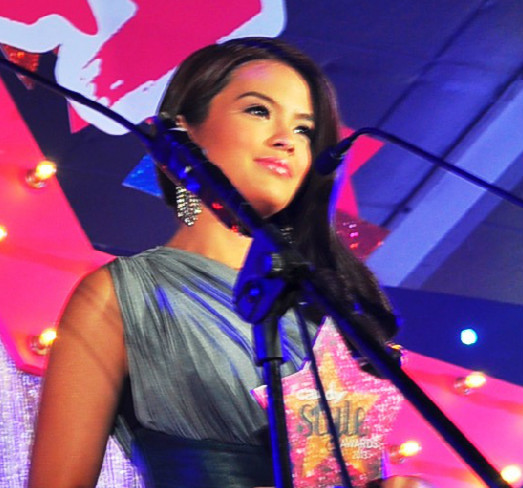
- Binene receiving at the 2013 Candy Style Awards
- Born: Beanca Marie Binene; November 4, 1997 (age 28); Quezon City, Philippines
- Education: MINT College (BA); Center for Asian Culinary Studies
- Occupations: Actress; singer
- Years active: 2004–present
- Agents: Sparkle (2004–2021); Viva Artists Agency (2022–present)
- Height: 1.53 m (5 ft 0 in)

Beanca Marie "Bea" Binene (born November 4, 1997) is a Filipino actress. She began her career as a finalist on StarStruck Kids in 2004. She is best known for her role as Natalie Dimaculangan in the 2010 television series First Time, as well as her performance in Hanggang Makita Kang Muli in 2016, both aired on GMA Network.

Since 2005, she has served as one of the Junior Ambassadors for the Haribon Foundation, and she has also volunteered with the GMA Kapuso Foundation and the Philippine Red Cross.

== Early life and education ==
Beanca Marie Binene was born on November 4, 1997. She attended at Holy Infant Montessori Center. She finished high school at Eton International School. She studied for a Bachelor of Arts in Film degree at MINT College. She studied Professional Culinary and Pastry Arts degree at the Center for Asian Culinary Studies in 2019. During the COVID-19 pandemic, She took online courses from the Harvard Business School, Kellogg School of Management, and London Business School. She finished Pro-Culinary Asian Studies at Center for Asian Culinary Studies in 2025.

Aside from her native Filipino, Binene is fluent in Mandarin Chinese and Korean.

== Career ==
Bea Binene first appeared in the talent search StarStruck Kids (2004). As a child star, she became a regular cast member in the now-defunct sitcom Bahay Mo Ba 'To? (2004), as well as the weekly children's show Lovely Day (2004). She later joined the variety show SOP (2010).

She appeared in the GMA Network television series Reel Love Presents Tween Hearts (2010), where she played the role of tough girl Belinda Fortes. She also served as a regular host on Good News (2011) and Oh My Job, both aired on GMA News TV (now GTV). Her first lead role, alongside Jake Vargas, was in the television series Alice Bungisngis and Her Wonder Walis (2012). She took on her second antagonist role in Carmela (2014), starring alongside Alden Richards and Marian Rivera.

She portrayed a feral child in the hit afternoon series Hanggang Makita Kang Muli (2016), opposite Derrick Monasterio. She later took on the role of Anya in the sequel to Mulawin vs. Ravena (2017), where she played a Tabon, the daughter of Aviona and Rodrigo. She also appeared as Kitkat Bernardo in the primetime series Beautiful Justice (2020).

After 17 years with GMA Artist Center (now Sparkle), she signed with Viva Artists Agency in September 2022.

In 2022, Binene signed a contract with Viva Artists Agency. She was announced to be part of Viva Television's adaptation of The Rain in España, premiering in 2023.

== Personal life ==
Apart from her showbiz commitments, she is also an active wushu athlete with hopes of being able to play for the Philippine national wushu team in the future. She competed at the 2010 National Wushu Championships and earned a bronze medal. She is a certified PADI Open Water Scuba Diver. She is also a practicing Roman Catholic.

=== Relationship ===
Binene previously dated actor Jake Vargas and they broke up in 2015. In August 2025, she revealed that her boyfriend is a non-celebrity and wants to keep it private to protect the relationship. She admitted that one of her past mistakes about love was making it too public.

=== Business ===
Her business, Mix and Brew Coffee located at SM Megamall closed because of the COVID-19 pandemic.

In 2023, Binene relocated Mix and Brew Coffee to San Leonardo, Nueva Ecija, the province of her mother. She was reported to have personally served as barista at the café.

== Filmography ==
=== Film ===
Year	Title	Role
2010	Si Agimat at si Enteng Kabisote	Roja / Saling
2011	Tween Academy: Class of 2012	Georgina / George
2011	Ang Panday 2	Warrior
2012	My Kontrabida Girl	Joyce Bernal
2012	Delusyon	Barbie
2014	Hakbang sa Pangarap	Niña Perfecto
2015	Liwanag sa Dilim	Viola
2016	Enteng Kabisote 10 and the Abangers	Allaine / A2
2017	Fading Paradise	
2019	Ang Sikreto ng Piso	Leonor
2023	Will You Be My Ex?	Yanna
2024	Sunny	young Chona
2024	Pasahero	Angel
2024	Nokturno	Joana
2025	Posthouse	Rea
2026	Pee Mak Philippine Adaptation	Pee-nang

=== Television ===
Year	Title	Role	Note(s)
2004	StarStruck Kids	Herself (finalist)	
2004–2009	Lovely Day	Herself (co-host)	
2005–2006	Bahay Mo Ba 'To?	Junabeth Mulingtapang	
2007	Sabi Ni Nanay		
2007	Pati Ba Pintig ng Puso	Young Jenna	
2008	Joaquin Bordado	Liza	
2008	Kaputol ng Isang Awit	Young Mimay	
2009–2010	SOP Fully Charged	Herself (performer)	
2010	First Time	Natalie Dimaculangan	
2010–2013	Party Pilipinas	Herself (performer)	
2010–2012	Reel Love Presents Tween Hearts	Belinda "Belle" Fortes	
2010	Ilumina	Tina Roque / Evelina Abella	
2011–2021	Good News Kasama si Vicky Morales	Herself	Good News Girl (Segment Anchor)
2011	Captain Barbell	Misha / Blade	
2011	Pepito Manaloto	Stephanie / Step	
2011	Pahiram ng Isang Ina	"Berna" Martinez	
2012	Alice Bungisngis and her Wonder Walis	Alice Asuncion-Fernandez / Daisy Reyes	
2012	Luna Blanca (Book 2)	Teenage Luna	
2012	Pepito Manaloto: Ang Tunay na Kwento	Erika	
2012–2013	Cielo de Angelina	Angelina Nantes	
2013	Indio	Teenage Rosa	
2013	The Ryzza Mae Show	Herself (guest)	with Jake Vargas
2013–2016	Vampire ang Daddy Ko	Bebe Chubibo	
2013	Home Sweet Home	Lucy Buena	
2013–2015	Sunday All Stars	Herself (performer)	
2014	Tunay na Buhay	Herself (host)	
2014	Carmela	Eunice	
2014–2015	Strawberry Lane	Clarissa Morales	
2015	Yagit	Jam	
2016	Hanggang Makita Kang Muli	Ana Medrano / Angela	
2016	Hay, Bahay!	Nadine "Yayen"	
2016–2017	Tsuperhero	Eva / Tsupergirl	
2017	Mulawin vs. Ravena	Anya Manalastas	
2018	Kapag Nahati ang Puso	Claire del Valle / Gabriella Matias-del Valle	
2018	Road Trip	Herself (guest)	
2019	Dragon Lady	Young Almira	
2019–2020	Beautiful Justice	Katrina "Kitkat" Bernardo	
2020	Daddy's Gurl	Aiza Guevarra	
2022	The Fake Life	Young Cindy	
2023	The Rain In España	Avianna "Via" Diaz	
2023	Ur Da Boss	Herself (guest)	
2023	Magandang Buhay	Herself (guest)	
2023	For the Love: Mahika	Jenn	
2023	Safe Skies, Archer	Avianna "Via" Diaz	
2024	Chasing in the Wild	Avianna "Via" Diaz	
2024	It's Showtime	Herself (guest)	
2025–2026	Golden Scenery of Tomorrow	Avianna Rye "Via" Diaz	with Wilbert Ross
2025–2026	Totoy Bato	Emerald Espejo	
2026	Love U Lots	Ysabelle Navarro	with Wilbert Ross

Anthology performances
Year	Title	Role	Note(s)
2009–2010	Dear Friend	Jillian	Episode: "My Christmas List"
2010–2015	Maynila	Lalay	Episode: "The Best Girl"
2010–2015	Maynila	Joy	Episode: "Voice of the Heart"
2010–2015	Maynila	Eunice	Episode: "Tatay's Girl"
2010–2015	Maynila	Isay	Episode: "Affairs of the Past"
2010–2015	Maynila	Cora	Episode: "Biyaheng Puso"
2010–2015	Maynila	Pauleen	Episode: "I Love You and I Know It"
2010–2015	Maynila	Lily	Episode: "Perfect Someone"
2010–2015	Maynila	Sheiden	Episode: "Txtm8, Luvm8"
2010–2015	Maynila	Ayen	Episode: "Recipe for Love"
2010–2015	Maynila	Claring	Episode: "Bagong Taon, Bagong Puso"
2010–2015	Maynila	Carol	Episode: "Can You Read My Heart"
2018–2020	Magpakailanman	Rosel Placido	Episode: "Palimos ng Pag-ibig"
2018–2020	Magpakailanman	Desiree Pinaglabanan	Episode: "Yanig ng Buhay – The Pampanga Earthquake Victims Story"
2018–2020	Magpakailanman	Lorie Pamintuan	Episode: "The Lockdown Wife"
2011	Spooky Nights	Herself	Episode: "Bahay ni Lolo"

=== Radio ===
Year	Title
2020–2022	OMJ: Oh My Job

== Discography ==
=== Studio albums ===
Artist	Album	Tracks	Year	Records	Certification
Bea Binene	Hey It's Me, Bea! (Format: CD, LP plaka, download, cassette tape)	Urong Sulong; Hey It's Me; Mahal Kita, Walang Iba; Sayang na Sayang; Mahal Kita, Walang Iba (duet with Jake Vargas) Minus One of all the songs	August 2012	PolyEast Records Galaxy Records	Gold Record Status (November 2012) Platinum Record Status (December 2012)
Bea Binene	Hey It's Me, Bea! Limited Christmas Edition (Format: CD, LP plaka, download, cassette tape)	Ako Ang Nauna (Bumati Sa Inyo); Miss Kita Kung Christmas; Urong Sulong; Hey It's Me; Mahal Kita, Walang Iba; Sayang na Sayang; Mahal Kita, Walang Iba (duet with Jake Vargas) Minus One of all the songs	2012	PolyEast Records Galaxy Records	
Bea Binene with Ken Chan	Dito sa Puso Ko (Format: LP plaka, CD, download)	Whoops Kirri; High School; Dito Sa Puso Ko; Nais Ko Malaman Mo (Ken Chan); Bakit Ngayon Ka Lang (duet with Ken Chan); Ang Tipo Kong Lalaki; Sumayaw. Sumunod; Asa Ka Pa; Bakit Labis Kitang Mahal (duet with Ken Chan); Sumayaw, Sumunod (Extended Version) (Ken Chan)	November 2013	PolyEast Records	

== Awards and nominations ==
Year	Association	Category	Work	Result	Ref.
2010	58th FAMAS Awards	German Moreno Youth Achievement Award	—N/a	Won	
2011	Yahoo! OMG! Awards	Awesome Young Actress	—N/a	Nominated	
2012	Yahoo! OMG! Awards	Most Promising Actress of the Year	—N/a	Nominated	
2012	32nd Huwarang Ina Awards	Most Outstanding Female Teleserye Artist	—N/a	Won	
2012	43rd Guillermo Mendoza Memorial Scholarship Foundation Box Office Entertainment Awards	Most Promising Loveteam for Movies & TV (shared with Jake Vargas)	—N/a	Won	
2012	24K Gold Awards	Gold Record Award	Hey It's Me, Bea	Won	
2012	9th Platinum Circle Awards	Platinum Record Award	Hey It's Me, Bea	Won	
2014	45th Guillermo Mendoza Memorial Scholarship Foundation Box Office Entertainment Awards	Promising Female Singer/Performer	—N/a	Won	
2014	Yahoo! Celebrity Awards	Celebrity Couple of the Year (shared with Jake Vargas)	—N/a	Won	
