= Juancho Triviño =

Filipino actor and model (born 1993)

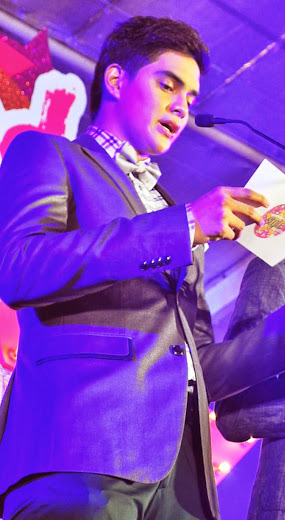
- Triviño in 2013
- Born: Juan Carlo Leveriza Calupitan-Triviño; April 13, 1993 (age 33); Santa Rosa, Laguna, Philippines
- Education: De La Salle Canlubang
- Occupations: Actor; comedian; model; host; podcaster; vlogger
- Years active: 2012–present
- Spouse: Joyce Pring (m. 2020)
- Children: 3

Juan Carlo "Juancho" Leveriza Calupitan-Triviño (born April 13, 1993) is a Filipino actor, comedian, model, host, podcaster and vlogger. He is best known for portraying the role of Padre Salvi in Maria Clara at Ibarra.

== Career ==
Triviño made his acting debut when he auditioned for the youth-oriented TV show of GMA Network called Teen Gen, which is believed to be the sequel of the highly acclaimed youth oriented drama T.G.I.S., which stars Angelu de Leon and Bobby Andrews. He later got the role of Lucho, the son of Bobby Andrews' character, the former lead character of T.G.I.S., and was paired with Dianne Hernandez, who is also a newcomer.

Triviño received his first acting award nomination for his role as Padre Salvi in Maria Clara at Ibarra at the 3rd Annual TAG Awards Chicago.

== Business ==
In 2021, Triviño is the owner of franchise, Tokyo Tempura with three branches South Supermarket Santa Rosa, SM Santa Rosa and South Supermarket Alabama.

During the COVID-19 pandemic, he worked as a project manager for a BPO company to support his family.

He also owned Triviño Food Services and FitCrew PH.

== Personal life ==
Triviño and host Joyce Pring are in a relationship since May 2019. They became engaged that August, (Note: Publicly recognized in November 2019) and married in Pasay City in February 2020. The couple have three children.

On November 5, 2022, Triviño graduated with a degree in entrepreneurship at De La Salle University after taking a break from his college journey in 2009.

== Filmography ==
=== Film ===
Year	Title	Role
2013	Pedro Calungsod: Batang Martir	Manuel Rangel
2015	La Amigas	One of the second four theater actors
2018	Wild and Free	Carlo

=== Television ===
Year	Title	Role
2012–13	Teen Gen	Luis Joaquin "Lucho" Torres IV
2013–19	Bubble Gang	Himself / Various
2013	Home Sweet Home	Prinsipe Adonis
2013–16	Pepito Manaloto: Ang Tunay na Kuwento	Nelson
2013–14	Villa Quintana	Jason "Jace" Quintana
2014	Magpakailanman: Dalawang Kasarian	Ale
2014	Wagas: The Tessie & Jessie Love Story	Young Jessie
2014	Magpakailanman: Ang Paghihiganti ng Masamang Engkanto	Young Miguel
2014	Maynila: Lovelier the Second Time	Rico
2015	InstaDad	Dwight Dominguez
2015	The Half Sisters	Charles
2015	Maynila: Edi Wow	
2015	Magpakailanman: Katawan Ko, Bayaran Mo	Dennis
2015	Karelasyon: Piano	JC
2015–16	Little Nanay	Bruce Wayne Batongbuhay
2016	Wagas: Fairy Tale Love - The Cata Tibayan and Jert Yao Story	Jert Yao
2016	Magpakailanman: Ina Ko, Aswang	Eli
2016	Dishkarte of the Day	Himself
2016–21	Unang Hirit	Himself
2016	Magkaibang Mundo	Elfino / Ellias "Inoy" Cruz
2016	Wagas: Champion ng Buhay Ko	Japoy Lizardo
2016	Maynila: Once Upon a Fairytale	Dean
2016	Karelasyon: Bonus	Chris
2016	Magpakailanman: Lost Phone, Love Found	Michael
2016	Tsuperhero	Obet / Thunder Man
2016	Dear Uge: Si Badong at si Bading	Gardo
2017	Maynila: My Family's Secret	Mauro
2017	Destined to be Yours	Badong Baltazar
2017	Magpakailanman: Ang Best Friend Kong Aso - The Eddie Boy Redoloza and Black Jack Story	Alvin
2017	Dear Uge: My Hot Momma	Allen
2017	Magpakailanman: Sa Likod ng Sexy Image - The Kim Domingo Story	Manny
2017	Maynila: Love Plus Two - The Diza Escora-Asejo Story	Arvin
2017	Wagas: Babaeng Syokoy	Jose
2017	Magpakailanman: BSF: Best Sisters Forever - The Lagdamat Sisters Story	Kiel
2018	Daig Kayo ng Lola Ko: Si Princess Frances at ang Gisantes	Jimboy
2018	Inday Will Always Love You	Ernest Pascual
2018	Maynila: My Girlfriend Is A Gangster	Rudy
2018	Road Trip	Himself
2018	Tadhana: Tunay Na Ina	Security guard
2018–19	Asawa Ko, Karibal Ko	David Santiago
2019	Wagas: Alaala Ka	Rading
2019	Magpakailanman: Kailan Naging Ama ang Isang Babae - The Roxanne D'Salles Epic Story	Roland
2019	Tadhana: Serial Killer	Francis
2019–20	Madrasta	Sean Ledesma
2020	Magpakailanman: Mister, Bugbog kay Misis	Mark
2021	Tadhana: Memory	Jun
2021	My Fantastic Pag-ibig: Dear Ghostwriter	Joshua
2022	Little Princess	Damien Santiago
2022	Imbestigador: Doctor to the Barrio Murder	Dr. Dreyfuss Perlas
2022	Magpakailanman: Ampon Man Sa Iyong Paningin	Louie
2022–23	Maria Clara at Ibarra	Padre Bernardo Salvi
2023	Magpakailanman: The Voice of Love	Noli Misalucha
2023	Maging Sino Ka Man	Gilberto "Gilbert" Arnaiz
2024	Widows' War	Abdul Casas
2024	Regal Studio Presents: I Remember You	Kyle
2025	Lolong: Bayani ng Bayan	Hector
2025	Maka	Rex
2025	Love on the Clock	Himself / Host
2025–26	Sanggang-Dikit FR	Councilor Glen Guerrero

=== Podcast ===
Year	Title	Note
2022	One on Juancho	Host

== Accolades and recognitions ==
3rd Annual TAG Awards Chicago (2022): Best Supporting Actor - Maria Clara at Ibarra

7th GEMS Awards 2023: Best Performance by an Actor in a Supporting Role (TV Series) - Maria Clara at Ibarra
