= Nicole Dulalia =

Filipino actress

- Born: Maria Nicole Jeremiah B. Dulalia; October 20, 1997 (age 28); Philippines
- Years active: 2007–2018
- Agent: GMA Artist Center (2007–2018)
- Website: instagram.com/nicoledulalia/ twitter.com/nicoledulalia facebook.com/nicoledulalia77/

Maria Nicole Jeremiah Dulalia (born October 20, 1997) is a Filipino television actress. She entered showbiz when she was chosen to play the role of Sha-sha in the telefantasya, Super Twins. She played Lev in GMA Network's telenovela, Alice Bungisngis and her Wonder Walis which concluded in June 2012. She has since played supporting roles in a range of GMA-7 television series, including Villa Quintana (2013-2014) as Maricel Mangaron, Niño (2014) as Patty, Strawberry Lane as Chloe Bermudez and Once Upon a Kiss (2015) as Margaux.

== Filmography ==
=== Television ===
Year	Title	Role
2007	La Vendetta	Young Rodora
2007	Zaido: Pulis Pangkalawakan	Ida Dida
2007	Marimar	Young Señora Angelika
2007	Super Twins	Sha-sha
2012	Alice Bungisngis and her Wonder Walis	Lev
2013	Magpakailanman: "School Bullying caught on cam"	Maxine Biduya
2013	Anna Karenina	Candice
2013–2014	Villa Quintana	Maricel Mangaron
2014	Strawberry Lane	Chloe Bermudez
2014	Niño	Patty
2015	Once Upon a Kiss	Margaux
2015	Maynila: Type Kita, Type Mo Ay Iba	
2016	Maynila: Party Pa More	Aileen
2016	Karelasyon: Kasaunduan	Young Bela
2017	Meant to Be	SPO1 April Reyes
2017	Destined to be Yours	Tina Melendez
2017	Magpakailanman: Mag-inang Biktima	Lisa
2018	Magpakailanman: My Sister, My Mother	Young Ayesa
