= Joaquin Bordado =

2008 Philippine television drama series

- Title card
- Genre: Action drama; Fantasy
- Based on: Joaquin Bordado by Carlo J. Caparas
- Developed by: Suzette Doctolero
- Directed by: Mac Alejandre; Argel Joseph
- Starring: Robin Padilla
- Theme music composer: Marc Tupaz; Sam Santos
- Opening theme: "Wag Kang Matakot" by Shamrock
- Ending theme: "Ikaw Lang" by Marc Tupaz and Maricris Garcia
- Country of origin: Philippines
- Original language: Tagalog
- No. of episodes: 108

Production
- Executive producer: Joseph Buncalan
- Production locations: Metro Manila, Philippines
- Camera setup: Multiple-camera setup
- Running time: 30–45 minutes
- Production company: GMA Entertainment TV

Original release
- Network: GMA Network
- Release: February 11 – July 11, 2008

Joaquin Bordado is a 2008 Philippine television drama action fantasy series broadcast by GMA Network. The series is based on a Philippine comic book serial by Carlo J. Caparas with the same title. Directed by Mac Alejandre and Argel Joseph, it stars Robin Padilla in the title role. It premiered on February 11, 2008 on the network's Telebabad line up. The series concluded on July 11, 2008, with a total of 108 episodes.

A behind the scenes special of the series Ang Mundo ni Joaquin Bordado (transl. the world of Joaquin Bordado) was aired on February 8, 2008.

== Cast and characters ==
Cast

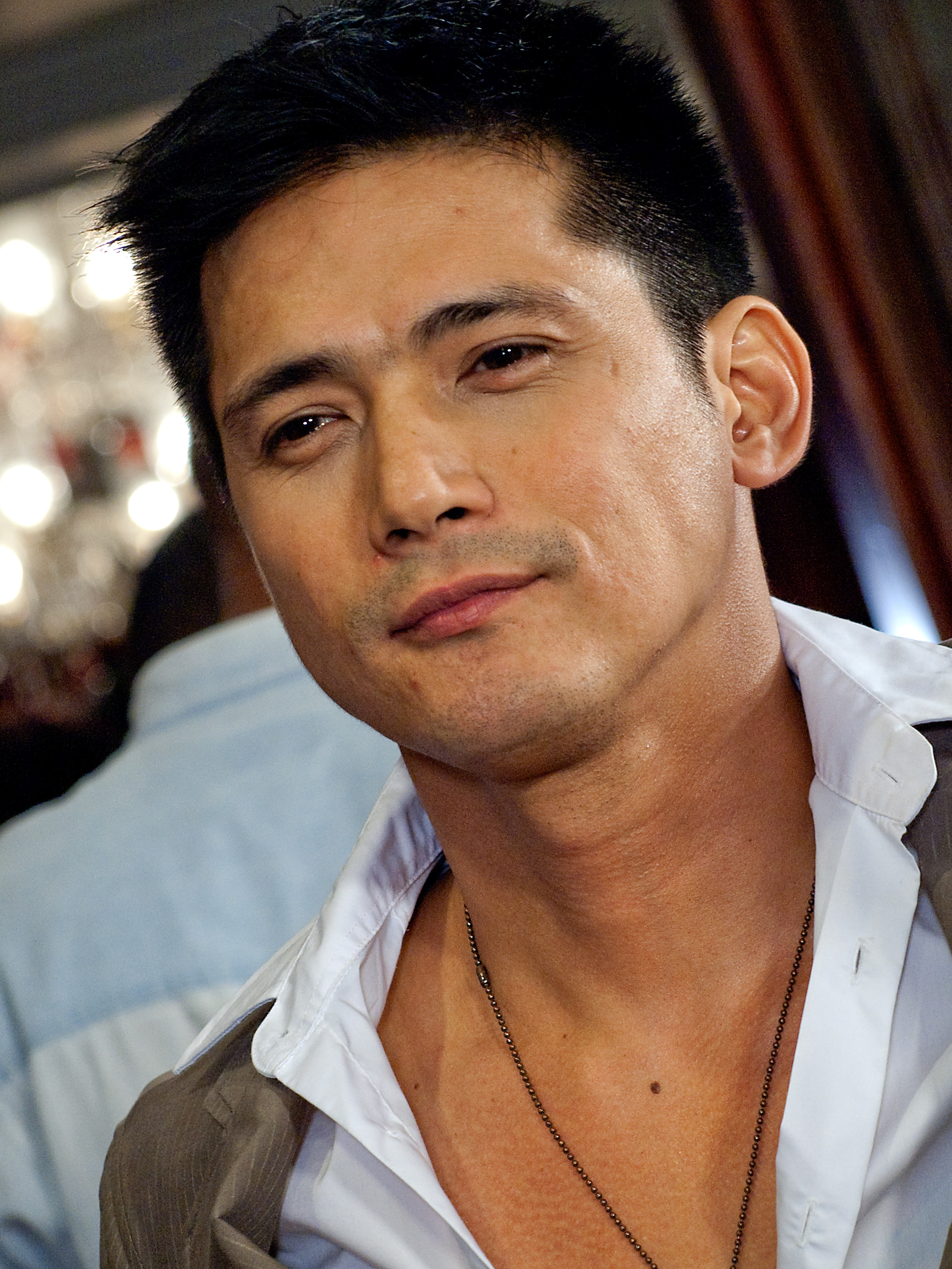
Robin Padilla

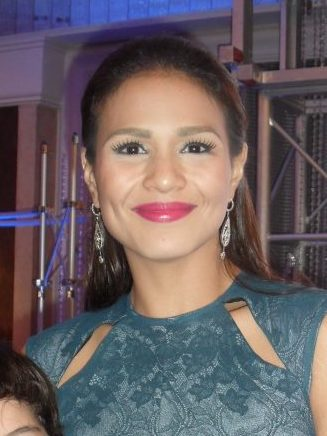
Iza Calzado

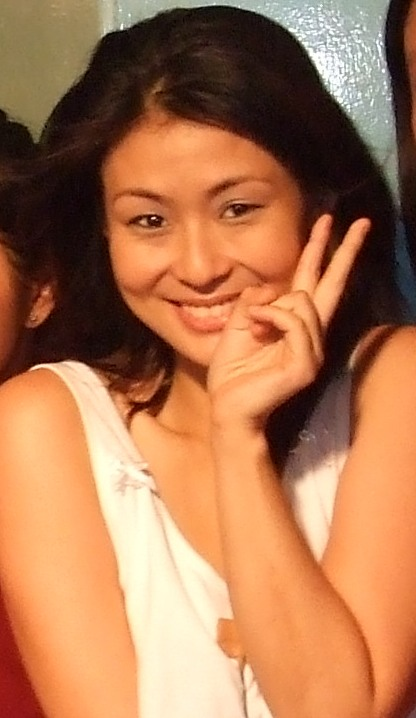
Iwa Moto

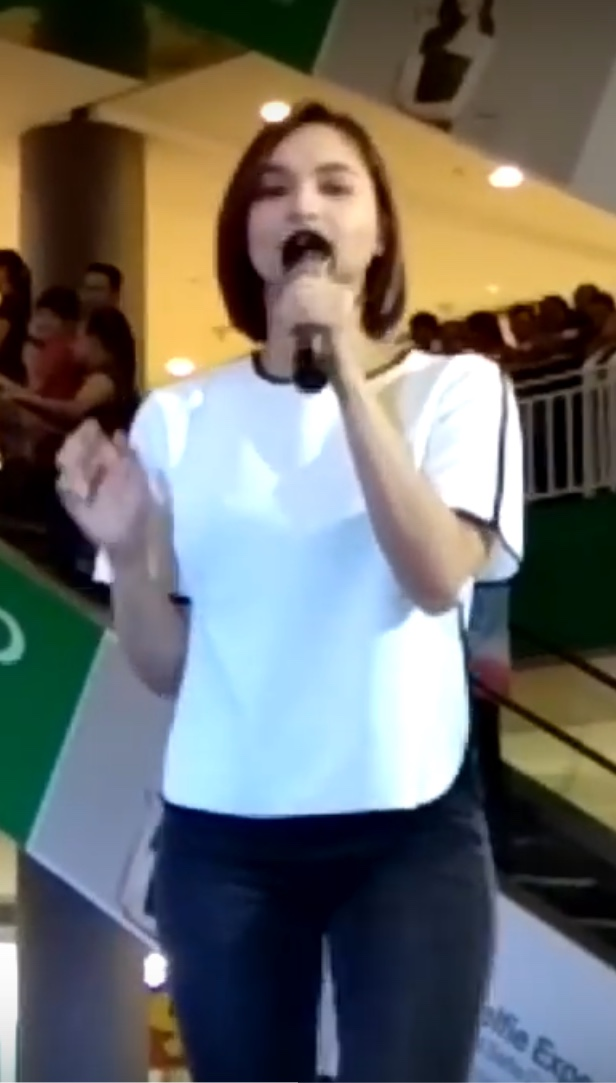
Ryza Cenon

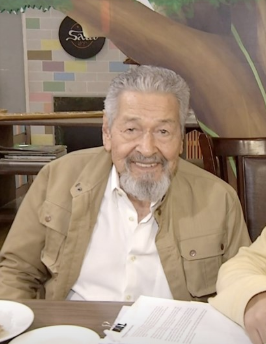
Eddie Garcia

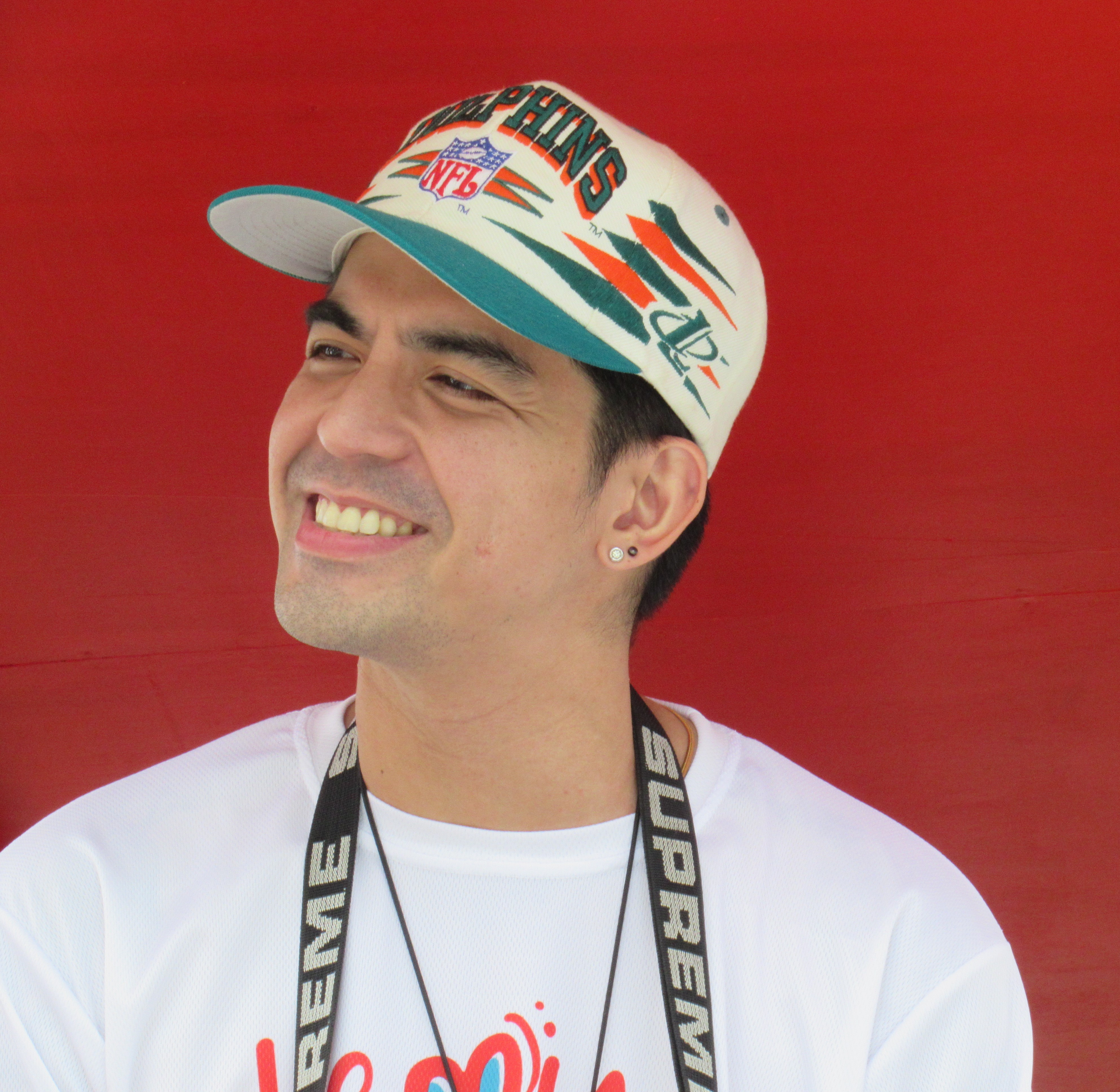
Mark Herras

Lead cast

- Robin Padilla as Joaquin Bordado / Joaquin Apacible

Supporting cast

- Iza Calzado as Sofia Apacible / Carol Aguila
- Eddie Garcia as Russo
- Ian Veneracion and Prince Stefan as Jerome Apacible / Miguel Aguila
- Mark Herras as Jason Apacible / Andre
- John Regala as Cefiro
- Antonio Aquitania as Kevin
- Renz Valerio as Jimboy
- Iwa Moto as Diane
- Ryza Cenon as Cecile
- Pen Medina and BJ Forbes as Jilco
- Rommel Padilla as Alfredo
- Maverick Relova as Tom
- Ariel Villasanta as Jerry
- Jun Hidalgo as Hugo
- Kylie Padilla as Erenea

Recurring cast

- Ralph Padilla as Mico
- Gloria Sevilla as Lolit
- John Feir as Johnny
- Gene Padilla as Franco
- July Hidalgo as Preston
- Melissa Avelino as Andeng
- Bea Binene as Liza
- Jake Vargas as Baloy
- Mon Confiado as Warden Gomez
- Maggie Wilson as Brianna
- Gina Alajar as Regina

Guest cast

- Marky Cielo as teenage Joaquin
- Raquel Motesa as Daniel's mother
- Timothy Chan as younger Joaquin
- Nonie Buencamino as Mr. Apacible
- Ella V. as Alcera
- Anna Leah Javier as Vexus
- Daiana Menezes as Ivarna
- Jenny Miller as Elixera
- Leila Kuzma as Agoria
- Rez Cortez as Mendoza
- Tyron Perez as Mon
- Zamierre Benevice as Charisse
- Cris Martinez as Jojo
- Ayen Laurel as Minerva
- Shamaine Centenera-Buencamino as Joaquin's mother
- Anton Bernardo as Domeng
- Victor Aliwalas as Nelson
- Joseph Izon as Olsen
- Shiela Marie Rodriguez as Vicky
- Shirley Fuentes as Celeste
- Richard Quan as Ronaldo

== Production ==
Principal photography commenced on December 13, 2007. Actor Robin Padilla had to endure six hours of body make-up for his tattoos in the series. Ten crew members of the series were injured after their L-300 van crashed along the North Luzon Expressway (NLEX) Valenzuela exit on May 6, 2008. Rushed to the Orthopedic Hospital was Ronaldo Godoy; to the Karuhatan Hospital were Demetrio Macaraig, stuntman Danny Bragais, Abnel Severino, Alfredo Manzanares, Steve Esguerra, and Ronnie Santos; and to the Monte Clara Montefalco Hospital in Meycauayan were Alvin Tercena, Francisco Minarag, and Rogelio Elgacio.

== Ratings ==
According to AGB Nielsen Philippines' Mega Manila household television ratings, the pilot episode of Joaquin Bordado earned a 36.6% rating. The final episode scored a 40.8% rating.

== Accolades ==
Accolades received by Joaquin Bordado
Year	Award	Category	Recipient	Result	Ref.
2008	22nd PMPC Star Awards for Television	Best Drama Actor	Robin Padilla	Nominated	
2008	22nd PMPC Star Awards for Television	Best New Female TV Personality	Kylie Padilla	Nominated	
2008	22nd PMPC Star Awards for Television	Best Primetime Drama Series	Joaquin Bordado	Nominated	
