= Jenny Miller =

Filipino actress (born 1980)

- Born: Jennifer A. Rances (Note: Jenny Miller's real name is Jennifer A. Rances.); February 5, 1980 (age 46); Lucena, Quezon, Philippines
- Occupation: Actress
- Years active: 1997–present
- Spouse: Cupid Feril (m. 2010)

Jenny Miller (born February 5, 1980) is a Filipino actress. She is known on her role as Beverly Castro in the TV remake of the 1989 film Babangon Ako't Dudurugin Kita that aired on GMA Network in 2008 and she is currently a freelance artist.

== Career ==
Miller started her acting career on ABS-CBN in the Philippines. She first appeared in the show Buttercup (2003) and then got a spot in the supporting cast on the series Marina as Vyxia in 2004. Then followed her role as a Fire Fairy on the horror series Spirits (2005). Her last show on ABS-CBN was Kokey, a fantasy kids series.

Miller changed to the rival GMA Network in 2007. Her first role was on Impostora co-starring with Iza Calzado, Sunshine Dizon and Jean Garcia. She became one of the main cast of the drama Babangon Ako't Dudurugin Kita in the role of Beverly, which aired in 2008. In 2009 Miller guest starred on the series All About Eve.

She is an additional cast member on the series Luna Mystika as one of the villains. Presently she is also a regular cast member of the horror drama series Midnight DJ aired on TV5 in the role of Trixie, and she is in the supporting cast on the TV show All My Life on the GMA Network. In 2010, she also appears in the GMA made-for-TV movie Tinik sa Dibdib.

== Personal life ==
Miller has a brother, actor and Kumu livestreamer Eian Rances, who gained prominence after joining Pinoy Big Brother: Kumunity Season 10 as a celebrity housemate.

== Filmography ==
=== Film ===
Year	Title	Role
2003	Pinay Pie	Greta
2003	Noon at Ngayon..Pagsasamang Kayganda	cameo
2004	Feng Shui	Dina
2006	I Wanna Be Happy	Lisa
2015	Etiquette for Mistresses	Tara
2020	Four Sisters Before the Wedding	Rosa

=== Television ===
Year	Title	Role
1997-2002	Oka tokat	
1999–2001	G-mik!	
2000–2001	Kakabakaba	Jim's mistress
2001–2004	Whattamen	
2002	Maalaala Mo Kaya: Singsing	
2002	Maalaala Mo Kaya: Treehouse	
2002–2004	Berks	Gwyneth's stepmother
2002–2005	Bida si Mister, Bida si Misis	Lovely
2003–2004	Buttercup	Rochelle
2004	Marina	Vexia
2004–2005	Spirits	Diwatang Apoy
2005–2006	Mga Anghel na Walang Langit	young Gaudencia "Gude" Redondo-Hawkins
2006	Maalaala Mo Kaya: Radyo	Josephine
2006	Komiks: Paa ni Isabella	Isabella
2006	Your Song: Kung Paano	Rizza
2007	Komiks: Pedro Penduko at ang mga Engkantao	Belle
2007	Impostora	Fritzie
2007	Kokey	Divina
2007–2008	La Vendetta	Mariel
2008	Maalaala Mo Kaya: Bibliya	Aleks
2008	Carlo J. Caparas' Joaquin Bordado	Queen Elixera
2008	Babangon Ako't Dudurugin Kita	Beverly Castro
2008	Codename: Asero	Greta / Lady Dragon
2008–2009	Luna Mystika	Aligwa
2008–2011	Midnight DJ	Trixie
2009	All About Eve	Nicole's Co-Worker
2009	All My Life	Nurse Dessa
2009–2010	Sine Novela: Tinik sa Dibdib	Nini Reyes
2010	Rosalka	Marlene
2011	Nita Negrita	Pia Antonio
2011–2012	Growing Up	Stella
2011–2012	Glamorosa	Cristy
2012	Isang Dakot na Luha	Fiona
2012	Be Careful With My Heart	Betsy
2012–2013	Kahit Puso'y Masugatan	Salve Gerona
2012	Third Eye	Sonia de Vera
2013	Mundo Mo'y Akin	Krizzy Ferreira
2013	Cassandra: Warrior Angel	Sonia de Vera (cross-over character on Third Eye)
2013	Pyra: Babaeng Apoy	Osang
2013	Magpakailanman: Kislap ng Parol	Elsa
2014	Maalaala Mo Kaya: Marriage Contract	Lydia
2014	Magpakailanman: Ang Babaeng May Dalawang Buhay: The Monica Salazar Alias Baby Face Story	General's wufe
2014	Maalaala Mo Kaya: Bonnet	Mercy
2015	Maalaala Mo Kaya: Mangga at Bagoong	Lita
2015	Healing Hearts	Emily Fuentes
2015	Ipaglaban Mo!: Sa Dulo ng Daan	Sonia
2015–2016	Princess in the Palace	Ms. Maria Ysabelle "Mai" Cordova
2016	Tubig at Langis	Abigail
2016	FPJ's Ang Probinsyano	Eric and Edwin's stepmother
2016	Maalaala Mo Kaya: Family Picture	Amalia
2016	Oh, My Mama!	Sabrina Cruz
2016	Ipaglaban Mo!: Bugaw	Shiela
2017	Maalaala Mo Kaya: Sketch Pad	Aging
2017	G.R.I.N.D.: Get Ready, It's a New Day	Loretta "Lorry" Diomendes
2017	Kambal, Karibal	Lerma
2017–2018	Hanggang Saan	Atty. Katrina Salvador
2019	Ipaglaban Mo: Labandera	Sheila
2019	Magpakailanman: Babaeng Ama	Milet
2019	Maalaala Mo Kaya: Dyip	Lisa
2019	It's Showtime: KapareWho	Herself as I Like to Movie Movie
2020	Magkaagaw	Nora Tan
2020	Bagong Umaga	Jenny Ponce
2021–2022	Marry Me, Marry You	Grace Dionisio
2022	2 Good 2 Be True	Tara Inocencio
2022	The Fake Life	Margaux Nova
2023	Tadhana: Reunion	Vanessa
2024	Pamilya Sagrado	Janette Solis
2025	Mommy Dearest	Dra. Samson
2025	What Lies Beneath	Marie Sevilla
2026	The Secrets of Hotel 88	Lourdes Madrigal
