= Lovely Day (TV program) =

Philippine television infotainment show

- Title card
- Also known as: LD Force; LD Force of the Guardians
- Genre: Infotainment
- Written by: Tata Betita
- Directed by: Tata Betita
- Presented by: Love Añover
- Theme music composer: Byron Merano; Carla Ocampo
- Country of origin: Philippines
- Original language: Tagalog
- No. of episodes: 263

Production
- Executive producer: Wilma Galvante
- Camera setup: Multiple-camera setup
- Running time: 45 minutes
- Production company: GMA News and Public Affairs

Original release
- Network: GMA Network
- Release: April 3, 2004 – May 23, 2009

Lovely Day is a Philippine television infotainment show broadcast by GMA Network. Hosted by Love Añover, it premiered on April 3, 2004. The show concluded on May 23, 2009, with a total of 263 episodes.

== Hosts ==
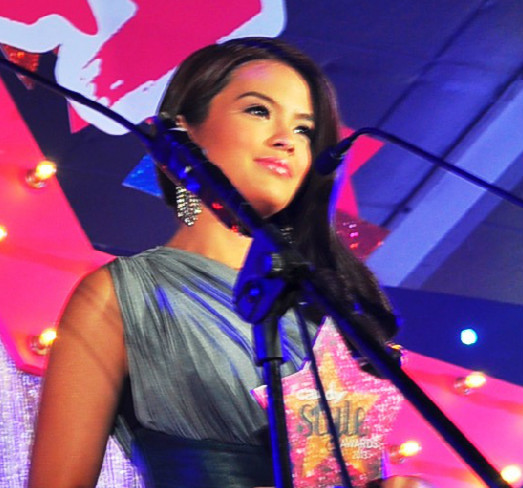
Bea Binene serves as a host.

- Love Añover
- Jacob Raterta
- Bea Binene
- Gabriel Roxas
- Christian Esteban
- BJ Forbes

== Ratings ==
According to AGB Nielsen Philippines' Mega Manila household television ratings, the final episode of Lovely Day scored a 9.1% rating.

== Accolades ==
Accolades received by Lovely Day
Year	Award	Category	Recipient	Result	Ref.
2009	Anak TV Seal Awards	Most Well-Liked TV Program	Lovely Day	Included	
