= List of Sherlock Jr. episodes =

Sherlock Jr. is a 2018 Philippine television drama crime series starring amazing stars like Ruru Madrid, Gabbi Garcia and Serena the Dog, voiced by Mikee Quintos. The series premiered on GMA Network's GMA Telebabad evening block and worldwide on GMA Pinoy TV on January 29, 2018, to April 27, 2018, replacing Super Ma'am.

NUTAM (Nationwide Urban Television Audience Measurement) People in Television Homes ratings are provided by AGB Nielsen Philippines.

== Series overview ==
Season	Episodes	Originally released	
Season	Episodes	First released	Last released
1	63	January 29, 2018	April 27, 2018

== Episodes ==
=== January 2018 ===
No. overall	No. season	Episode	Original air date	Social media hashtag	AGB Nielsen NUTAM People in Television Homes			Ref.
No. overall	No. season	Episode	Original air date	Social media hashtag	Ratings	Timeslot rank	Whole day rank	Ref.
1	1	"Pilot"	January 29, 2018	#SherlockJr	11.4%	#2	#2	
2	2	"Siri the Star"	January 30, 2018	#SherlockJrSiriTheStar	10.3%	#2	#3	
3	3	"Happy Family"	January 31, 2018	#SherlockJrHappyFamily	9.9%	#2	#3	
Average					10.5%			

=== February 2018 ===
No. overall	No. season	Episode	Original air date	Social media hashtag	AGB Nielsen NUTAM People in Television Homes			Ref.
No. overall	No. season	Episode	Original air date	Social media hashtag	Rating	Timeslot rank	Whole day rank	Ref.
4	4	"Tagapagligtas" (Savior)	February 1, 2018	#SherlockJrTagapagligtas	9.2%	#2	#6	
5	5	"Undercover"	February 2, 2018	#SherlockJrUndercover	10.2%	#2	#2	
6	6	"Irene"	February 5, 2018	#SherlockJrIrene	9.3%	#2	#6	
7	7	"Witness"	February 6, 2018	#SherlockJrWitness	10.0%	#2	#2	
8	8	"Pangungulila" (Desolation)	February 7, 2018	#SherlockJrPangungulila	9.2%	#2	#3	
9	9	"Hinala" (Suspicion)	February 8, 2018	#SherlockJrHinala	10.1%	#2	#5	
10	10	"Alaala" (Memory)	February 9, 2018	#SherlockJrAlaala	9.4%	#2	#5	
11	11	"Panganib" (Danger)	February 12, 2018	#SherlockJrPanganib	9.7%	#2	#4	
12	12	"Pagtugis" (Pursuit)	February 13, 2018	#SherlockJrPagtugis	9.7%	#2	#4	
13	13	"Save Lily"	February 14, 2018	#SherlockJrSaveLily	9.0%	#2	#4	
14	14	"Pag-asa" (Hope)	February 15, 2018	#SherlockJrPagAsa	9.6%	#2	#4	
15	15	"Kilig" (Romantic)	February 16, 2018	#SherlockJrKilig	9.4%	#2	#5	
16	16	"Pag-amin" (Confession)	February 19, 2018	#SherlockJrPagAmin	9.3%	#2	#5	
17	17	"Paghahanap" (Searching)	February 20, 2018	#SherlockJrPaghahanap	8.7%	#2	#7	
18	18	"Tensyon" (Tension)	February 21, 2018	#SherlockJrTensyon	8.7%	#2	#7	
19	19	"Peligro" (Danger)	February 22, 2018	#SherlockJrPeligro	9.0%	#2	#7	
20	20	"Hinala" (Suspicion)	February 23, 2018	#SherlockJrHinala	8.6%	#2	#6	
21	21	"Banta" (Threat)	February 26, 2018	#SherlockJrBanta	9.8%	#2	#5	
22	22	"Confession"	February 27, 2018	#SherlockJrConfession	9.7%	#2	#4	
23	23	"Katotohanan" (Truth)	February 28, 2018	#SherlockJrKatotohanan	9.3%	#2	#4	
Average					9.4%			

=== March 2018 ===
No. overall	No. in season	Episode	Original air date	Social media hashtag	AGB Nielsen NUTAM People in Television Homes			Ref.
No. overall	No. in season	Episode	Original air date	Social media hashtag	Rating	Timeslot rank	Whole day rank	Ref.
24	24	"Tulungan" (Helping)	March 1, 2018	#SherlockJrTulungan	9.5%	#2	#6	
25	25	"Save Siri"	March 2, 2018	#SherlockJrSaveSiri	8.2%	#2	#7	
26	26	"Rescue"	March 5, 2018	#SherlockJrRescue	8.4%	#2	#5	
27	27	"Takas" (Escape)	March 6, 2018	#SherlockJrTakas	9.1%	#2	#3	
28	28	"Pagtatapat" (Adduction)	March 7, 2018	#SherlockJrPagtatapat	9.2%	#2	#5	
29	29	"Emosyon" (Emotion)	March 8, 2018	#SherlockJrEmosyon	9.3%	#2	#6	
30	30	"Friend Request"	March 9, 2018	#SherlockJrFriendRequest	9.1%	#2	#5	
31	31	"Set Up"	March 12, 2018	#SherlockJrSetUp	9.1%	#2	#6	
32	32	"Bihag" (Capture)	March 13, 2018	#SherlockJrBihag	9.0%	#2	#5	
33	33	"Pagliligtas" (Rescue)	March 14, 2018	#SherlockJrPagliligtas	9.2%	#2	#5	
34	34	"Damdamin" (Feeling)	March 15, 2018	#SherlockJrDamdamin	9.4%	#2	#6	
35	35	"Break Up"	March 16, 2018	#SherlockJrBreakUp	9.5%	#2	#5	
36	36	"Truth"	March 19, 2018	#SherlockJrTruth	—			
37	37	"Linlang" (Deception)	March 20, 2018	#SherlockJrLinlang	—			
38	38	"Saklolo" (Help)	March 21, 2018	#SherlockJrSaklolo	—			
39	39	"Pagtutugis" (Pursuit)	March 22, 2018	#SherlockJrPagtutugis	—			
40	40	"Harapan" (Confrontation)	March 23, 2018	#SherlockJrHarapan	8.6%	#2	#5	
41	41	"Trahedya" (Tragedy)	March 26, 2018	#SherlockJrTrahedya	9.8%	#2	#5	
42	42	"Hinagpis" (Resentment)	March 27, 2018	#SherlockJrHinagpis	10.3%	#2	#4	
43	43	"Rebelasyon" (Revelation)	March 28, 2018	#SherlockJrRebelasyon				
Average								

=== April 2018 ===
No. overall	No. in season	Episode	Original air date	Social media hashtag	AGB Nielsen NUTAM People in Television Homes			Ref.
No. overall	No. in season	Episode	Original air date	Social media hashtag	Ratings	Timeslot rank	Whole day rank	Ref.
44	44	"Tulong" (Help)	April 2, 2018	#SherlockJrTulong				
45	45	"Pagtutuos" (Reckoning)	April 3, 2018	#SherlockJrPagtutuos				
46	46	"Sigalot" (Friction)	April 4, 2018	#SherlockJrSigalot				
47	47	"Mission"	April 5, 2018	#SherlockJrMission				
48	48	"Confused"	April 6, 2018	#SherlockJrConfused				
49	49	"Surprise"	April 9, 2018	#SherlockJrSurprise				
50	50	"Sikreto" (Secret)	April 10, 2018	#SherlockJrSikreto				
51	51	"Protector"	April 11, 2018	#SherlockJrProtector				
52	52	"Sagupaan" (Encounter)	April 12, 2018	#SherlockJrSagupaan				
53	53	"Pagsagip" (Rescue)	April 13, 2018	#SherlockJrPagsagip				
54	54	"Tugis" (Pursuiting)	April 16, 2018	#SherlockJrTugis				
55	55	"Mastermind"	April 17, 2018	#SherlockJrMastermind	9.6%	#2		
56	56	"Father and Son"	April 18, 2018	#SherlockJrFatherAndSon				
57	57	"Kaaway" (Enemy)	April 19, 2018	#SherlockJrKaaway				
58	58	"Escape"	April 20, 2018	#SherlockJrEscape				
59	59	"Laban" (Fight)	April 23, 2018	#SherlockJrLaban				
60	60	"Aksyon" (Action)	April 24, 2018	#SherlockJrAksyon				
61	61	"Ganti" (Revenge)	April 25, 2018	#SherlockJrGanti				
62	62	"Muling Paghaharap" (Reconfrontation)	April 26, 2018	#SherlockJrMulingPaghaharap				
63	63	"Finale"	April 27, 2018	#SherlockJrFinale	10.2%	#2		
Average								
