= List of The Half Sisters episodes =

The Half Sisters is a 2014 Philippine television drama romantic series broadcast by GMA Network. It premiered on the network's Afternoon Prime line up from June 9, 2014, to January 15, 2016, replacing Villa Quintana.

Mega Manila ratings are provided by AGB Nielsen Philippines. The series ended, but its the 84th-week run, and with 418 episodes. It was replaced by Wish I May.

== Series overview ==
The series was originally set to air for 13 weeks. However, due to high ratings and feedback from viewers, the network decided to extend its run until January 2016. It was hailed as the network's longest running series for 2010's.

Month	Episodes	Monthly Averages
Month	Episodes	Mega Manila
June 2014	16	13.1%
July 2014	23	14.4%
August 2014	21	17.1%
September 2014	22	17.4%
October 2014	23	19.9%
November 2014	20	21.3%
December 2014	23	20.8%
January 2015	22	20.3%
February 2015	20	19.2%
March 2015	22	21.0%
April 2015	20	21.1%
May 2015	21	20.3%
June 2015	22	18.4%
July 2015	23	19.5%
August 2015	21	21.0%
September 2015	22	19.3%
October 2015	22	18.4%
November 2015	21	18.4%
December 2015	23	17.7%
January 2016	11	17.8%
Total	418	18.8%

== Episodes ==
=== June 2014 ===
Episode		Original air date	Social Media Hashtag	AGB Nielsen Mega Manila Households in Television Homes			Ref.
Episode		Original air date	Social Media Hashtag	Rating	Timeslot Rank	Daytime Rank	Ref.
1	Pilot	June 9, 2014	#TheHalfSisters	11.5%	#1	#8	
2	Pagsilang sa Kambal	June 10, 2014	#TheHalfSisters	12.7%	#1	#5	
3	Pagmamalupit kay Diana	June 11, 2014	#TheHalfSisters	13.6%	#1	#7	
4	Aksidente	June 12, 2014	#TheHalfSisters	13.8%	#1	#10	
5	Pagkabulag ni Rina	June 13, 2014	#TheHalfSisters	11.5%	#1	#11	
6	Baste and Bradley	June 16, 2014	#THSBasteAndBradley	12.4%	#1	#5	
7	Daddy Issues	June 17, 2014	#THSDaddyIssues	12.4%	#1	#5	
8	Maling Bintang	June 18, 2014	#THSMalingBintang	13.5%	#1	#4	
9	Bradley to the Rescue	June 19, 2014	#THSBradleyToTheRescue	14.0%	#1	#5	
10	Anything for Diana	June 20, 2014	#THSAnythingForDiana	14.1%	#1	#4	
11	The Revelation	June 23, 2014	#THSTheRevelation	12.0%	#1	#5	
12	Ang Plano ni Ashley	June 24, 2014	#THSAngPlanoNiAshley	11.8%	#1	#5	
13	Diana at Tonyo	June 25, 2014	#THSDianaAtTonyo	12.7%	#1	#4	
14	Diana vs. Ashley	June 26, 2014	#THSDianaVSAshley	12.9%	#1	#5	
15	Laya na si Benjie	June 27, 2014	#THSLayaNaSiBenjie	13.7%	#1	#4	
16	You're my hero, Bradley!	June 30, 2014	#YoureMyHeroBradley	16.2%	#1	#2	

=== July 2014 ===
Episode		Original air date	Social Media Hashtag	AGB Nielsen Mega Manila Households in Television Homes			Ref.
Episode		Original air date	Social Media Hashtag	Rating	Timeslot Rank	Daytime Rank	Ref.
17	Will you be my date, Diana?	July 1, 2014	#WillYouBeMyDateDiana	14.2%	#1	#3	
18	The Victory Ball	July 2, 2014	#THSTheVictoryBall	15.4%	#1	#2	
19	The Transformation	July 3, 2014	#THSTheTransformation	15.6%	#1	#2	
20	Benjie Saves Rina	July 4, 2014	#THSBenjieSavesRina	14.5%	#1	#3	
21	Secret is Out	July 7, 2014	#THSSecretIsOut	15.6%	#1	#2	
22	Benjie Tells All	July 8, 2014	#BenjieTellsAll	15.8%	#1	#2	
23	Bradley or Baste?	July 9, 2014	#BradleyOrBaste	16.3%	#1	#3	
24	The Adopted Sister	July 10, 2014	#TheAdoptedSister	16.6%	#1	#2	
25	Ashley to the Rescue	July 11, 2014	#AshleyToTheRescue	16.0%	#1	#3	
26	Daddy Benjie	July 14, 2014	#THSDaddyBenjie	15.5%	#1	#2	
27	Huli ka, Benjie!	July 15, 2014	#HuliKaBenjie	19.3%	#1	#2	
28	Nakaraan ni Rina	July 16, 2014	#NakaraanNiRina	6.7%	#1	#4	
29	Downfall of Ashley	July 17, 2014	#DownfallOfAshley	8.8%	#1	#3	
30	Ashley vs. Mean Girls	July 18, 2014	#AshleyVSMeanGirls	10.5%	#1	#3	
31	Pagdakip sa Mag-ama	July 21, 2014	#PagdakipSaMagAma	12.8%	#1	#2	
32	Bayad Utang	July 22, 2014	#THSBayadUtang	15.2%	#1	#2	
33	The Half Truth	July 23, 2014	#TheHalfTruth	14.9%	#1	#3	
34	Secrets and Lies	July 24, 2014	#THSSecretsAndLies	14.9%	#1	#2	
35	Meet the Lola	July 25, 2014	#MeetTheLola	14.7%	#1	#2	
36	Make a move, Baste!	July 28, 2014	#MakeAMoveBaste	15.3%	#1	#2	
37	The Result	July 29, 2014	#THSTheResult	16.0%	#1	#2	
38	The Switch	July 30, 2014	#THSTheSwitch	13.0%	#1	#3	
39	Lukso ng Dugo ni Benjie	July 31, 2014	#LuksoNgDugoNiBenjie	14.0%	#1	#3	

=== August 2014 ===
Episode		Original air date	Social Media Hashtag	AGB Nielsen Mega Manila Households in Television Homes			Ref.
Episode		Original air date	Social Media Hashtag	Rating	Timeslot Rank	Daytime Rank	Ref.
40	The Accident	August 1, 2014	#THSTheAccident	16.5%	#1	#2	
41	Kambal sa Mansyon	August 4, 2014	#KambalSaMansyon	16.0%	#1	#3	
42	The Invitation	August 5, 2014	#THSTheInvitation	17.8%	#1	#3	
43	Happy 18th Twins	August 6, 2014	#THSHappy18thTwins	16.0%	#1	#2	
44	Baste Saves the Day	August 7, 2014	#BasteSavesTheDay	17.7%	#1	#2	
45	Ang Nalalaman ni Lupita	August 8, 2014	#AngNalalamanNiLupita	18.0%	#1	#2	
46	Diana Not Guilty	August 11, 2014	#DianaNotGuilty	15.9%	#1	#2	
47	Maling Hinala ni Benjie	August 12, 2014	#MalingHinalaNiBenjie	16.0%	#1	#2	
48	Choose Happiness	August 13, 2014	#THSChooseHappiness	15.8%	#1	#2	
49	Dinner Disaster	August 14, 2014	#DinnerDisaster	16.4%	#1	#2	
50	Bradley Bids Goodbye	August 15, 2014	#BradleyBidsGoodbye	17.0%	#1	#2	
51	Sorry, Diana	August 18, 2014	#THSSorryDiana	16.3%	#1	#2	
52	Benjie Helps Alfred	August 19, 2014	#BenjieHelpsAlfred	16.2%	#1	#2	
53	Welcome back, Lupita!	August 20, 2014	#WelcomeBackLupita	18.0%	#1	#2	
54	First Day at Work	August 21, 2014	#FirstDayAtWork	16.5%	#1	#2	
55	The Promotion	August 22, 2014	#ThePromotion	17.9%	#1	#2	
56	Diana as Cassandra	August 25, 2014	#DianaAsCassandra	16.2%	#1	#2	
57	Baste, the Bridge	August 26, 2014	#BasteTheBridge	19.7%	#1	#2	
58	Stress sa Dress	August 27, 2014	#StressSaDress	17.0%	#1	#2	
59	Play Day	August 28, 2014	#THSPlayDay	20.4%	#1	#2	
60	Caretaker ni Rina	August 29, 2014	#CaretakerNiRina	17.5%	#1	#3	

=== September 2014 ===
Episode		Original air date	Social Media Hashtag	AGB Nielsen Mega Manila Households in Television Homes			Ref.
Episode		Original air date	Social Media Hashtag	Rating	Timeslot Rank	Daytime Rank	Ref.
61	Just Friends	September 1, 2014	#THSJustFriends	16.9%	#1	#2	
62	Jelly Ashley	September 2, 2014	#THSJellyAshley	17.3%	#1	#2	
63	Laban, Diana!	September 3, 2014	#THSLabanDiana	17.7%	#1	#2	
64	Kutob ni Rina	September 4, 2014	#THSKutobNiRina	17.7%	#1	#2	
65	Huli ka, Alfred!	September 5, 2014	#THSHuliKaAlfred	18.4%	#1	#2	
66	Buking	September 8, 2014	#TheHalfSisters	17.4%	#1	#3	
67	Venus Needs Help	September 9, 2014	#THSVenusNeedsHelp	17.6%	#1	#2	
68	Tension sa Mansion	September 10, 2014	#THSTensionSaMansion	17.8%	#1	#2	
69	Palabas ni Ashley	September 11, 2014	#THSPalabasNiAshley	16.2%	#1	#2	
70	Troubled Ashley	September 12, 2014	#THSTroubledAshley	16.2%	#1	#2	
71	Lupita's Improvement	September 15, 2014	#TheHalfSisters	19.1%	#1	#2	
72	The Switch Revealed	September 16, 2014	#TheSwitchRevealed	18.1%	#1	#2	
73	Huling Alas	September 17, 2014	#TheHalfSisters	20.8%	#1	#1	
74	Cruel Intentions	September 18, 2014	#THSCruelIntentions	19.7%	#1	#2	
75	Bradley is the Reason	September 19, 2014	#BradleyIsTheReason	18.1%	#1	#2	
76	Ashley Strikes Again	September 22, 2014	#AshleyStrikesAgain	16.8%	#1	#2	
77	Paawa ni Ashley	September 23, 2014	#PaawaNiAshley	15.7%	#1	#2	
78	Pagpaparaya ni Diana	September 24, 2014	#PagpaparayaNiDiana	16.5%	#1	#2	
79	True Feelings ni Baste	September 25, 2014	#TrueFeelingsNiBaste	16.2%	#1	#2	
80	Caught in Between	September 26, 2014	#CaughtInBetween	17.1%	#1	#2	
81	Ashley Begs for Love	September 29, 2014	#AshleyBegsForLove	16.0%	#1	#2	
82	Diana is Love	September 30, 2014	#DianaIsLove	16.0%	#1	#2	

=== October 2014 ===
Episode		Original air date	Social Media Hashtag	AGB Nielsen Mega Manila Households in Television Homes			Ref.
Episode		Original air date	Social Media Hashtag	Rating	Timeslot Rank	Daytime Rank	Ref.
83	Love and Pain	October 1, 2014	#THSLoveAndPain	14.8%	#1	#3	
84	It's a Date	October 2, 2014	#THSItsADate	17.3%	#1	#2	
85	The Kiss	October 3, 2014	#THSTheKiss	16.8%	#1	#2	
86	Changes	October 6, 2014	#THSChanges	17.9%	#1	#2	
87	Past Feelings	October 7, 2014	#THSPastFeelings	18.5%	#1	#2	
88	Lupita is the Key	October 8, 2014	#LupitaIsTheKey	18.8%	#1	#2	
89	Enough is Enough	October 9, 2014	#EnoughIsEnough	19.2%	#1	#2	
90	Diana Finds Out the Truth	October 10, 2014	#DianaFindsOutTheTruth	22.1%	#1	#1	
91	Stop Pretending	October 13, 2014	#THSStopPretending	20.8%	#1	#1	
92	The Real Half Sister	October 14, 2014	#TheRealHalfSister	22.0%	#1	#1	
93	Ang Tagapagmana	October 15, 2014	#THSAngTagapagmana	22.3%	#1	#1	
94	Switched Lives	October 16, 2014	#THSSwitchedLives	21.2%	#1	#1	
95	Diana's New Chapter	October 17, 2014	#DianasNewChapter	22.7%	#1	#1	
96	Who is Elizabeth McBride?	October 20, 2014	#WhoIsElizabethMcBride	21.4%	#1	#1	
97	Happy Together	October 21, 2014	#THSHappyTogether	21.9%	#1	#1	
98	Ang Katotohanan	October 22, 2014	#TheHalfSisters	21.0%	#1	#1	
99	Beginning of an End	October 23, 2014	#THSBeginningOfAnEnd	21.1%	#1	#1	
100	Finding Rina	October 24, 2014	#THSFindingRina	20.0%	#1	#1	
101	Diana is Safe	October 27, 2014	#THSDianaIsSafe	19.1%	#1	#1	
102	Don't give up, Diana!	October 28, 2014	#THSDontGiveUpDiana	20.1%	#1	#1	
103	Fake Rina	October 29, 2014	#THSFakeRina	20.9%	#1	#1	
104	Ang Mag-lola	October 30, 2014	#THSAngMagLola	19.2%	#1	#1	
105	Hanapin si Benjie	October 31, 2014	#THSHanapinSiBenjie	18.4%	#1	#2	

=== November 2014 ===
Episode		Original air date	Social Media Hashtag	AGB Nielsen Mega Manila Households in Television Homes			Ref.
Episode		Original air date	Social Media Hashtag	Rating	Timeslot Rank	Daytime Rank	Ref.
106	Lorna Helps Diana	November 3, 2014	#THSLornaHelpsDiana	18.9%	#1	#1	
107	True Identity	November 4, 2014	#THSTrueIdentity	20.2%	#1	#1	
108	Diana Gets Help	November 5, 2014	#THSDianaGetsHelp	19.3%	#1	#2	
109	Elizabeth's Discovery	November 6, 2014	#THSElizabethsDiscovery	19.2%	#1	#1	
110	Lost and Found	November 7, 2014	#THSLostAndFound	20.3%	#1	#1	
111	Naantalang Pagkikita	November 10, 2014	#TheHalfSisters	19.1%	#1	#1	
112	Angel in Disguise	November 11, 2014	#THSAngelInDisguise	20.4%	#1	#1	
113	Start of Something New	November 12, 2014	#THSStartOfSomethingNew	20.1%	#1	#1	
114	Alexa Robbins	November 13, 2014	#THSAlexaRobbins	21.0%	#1	#1	
115	Brand New Diana	November 14, 2014	#THSBrandNewDiana	22.7%	#1	#1	
116	Diana and Bradley Reunited	November 17, 2014	#DianaAndBradleyReunited	20.7%	#1	#1	
117	The Deal	November 18, 2014	#THSTheDeal	21.4%	#1	#1	
118	Unexpected Surprise	November 19, 2014	#THSUnexpectedSurprise	19.9%	#1	#1	
119	Don't lose hope, Diana!	November 20, 2014	#DontLoseHopeDiana	22.8%	#1	#1	
120	Muling Pagkikita	November 21, 2014	#THSMulingPagkikita	22.7%	#1	#1	
121	Mystery Girl	November 24, 2014	#THSMysteryGirl	21.9%	#1	#1	
122	Rina's Revenge	November 25, 2014	#THSRinasRevenge	23.1%	#1	#1	
123	Most Awaited Meeting	November 26, 2014	#THSMostAwaitedMeeting	21.6%	#1	#1	
124	Mystery Girl of the Night	November 27, 2014	#MysteryGirlOfTheNight	24.2%	#1	#1	
125	Ultimate Face Off	November 28, 2014	#THSUltimateFaceOff	25.6%	#1	#1	

=== December 2014 ===
Episode		Original air date	Social Media Hashtag	AGB Nielsen Mega Manila Households in Television Homes			Ref.
Episode		Original air date	Social Media Hashtag	Rating	Timeslot Rank	Daytime Rank	Ref.
126	The Suspicion	December 1, 2014	#THSTheSuspicion	22.1%	#1	#1	
127	World War II	December 2, 2014	#THSWorldWarII	20.7%	#1	#1	
128	Aura ni Alexa	December 3, 2014	#THSAuraNiAlexa	21.3%	#1	#1	
129	Ashley Meets Alexa	December 4, 2014	#THSAshleyMeetsAlexa	21.7%	#1	#1	
130	Fake Date	December 5, 2014	#THSFakeDate	22.2%	#1	#1	
131	Finally Found	December 8, 2014	#THSFinallyFound	24.9%	#1	#1	
132	Family Reunion	December 9, 2014	#THSFamilyReunion	24.5%	#1	#1	
133	OJT Problems	December 10, 2014	#THSOJTProblems	22.1%	#1	#1	
134	The Challenge	December 11, 2014	#THSTheChallenge	23.3%	#1	#1	
135	Alexa is Rina	December 12, 2014	#THSAlexaIsRina	20.7%	#1	#1	
136	Rina's Challenge	December 15, 2014	#THSRinasChallenge	21.2%	#1	#1	
137	Half Sisters Competition	December 16, 2014	#THSHalfSistersCompetition	21.1%	#1	#1	
138	Best Intern	December 17, 2014	#THSBestIntern	19.7%	#1	#1	
139	Diana Gets Help	December 18, 2014	#THSDianaGetsHelp	21.5%	#1	#1	
140	Under the Spell	December 19, 2014	#THSUnderTheSpell	21.5%	#1	#1	
141	Night of Romance	December 22, 2014	#THSNightOfRomance	19.9%	#1	#1	
142	Paghihiganti ni Rina	December 23, 2014	#THSPaghihigantiNiRina	20.0%	#1	#1	
143	Prisoners for a Day	December 24, 2014	#THSPrisonersForADay	21.7%	#1	#1	
144	Motherly Problems	December 25, 2014	#THSMotherlyProblems	15.7%	#1	#2	
145	Outreach for Peace	December 26, 2014	#THSOutreachForPeace	19.1%	#1	#1	
146	The Tragedy	December 29, 2014	#THSTheTragedy	18.8%	#1	#1	
147	Elizabeth Meets Alfred	December 30, 2014	#TheHalfSisters	17.8%	#1	#1	
148	Unfortunate Event	December 31, 2014	#THSUnfortunateEvent	15.8%	#1	#1	

=== January 2015 ===
Episode		Original air date	Social Media Hashtag	AGB Nielsen Mega Manila Households in Television Homes			Ref.
Episode		Original air date	Social Media Hashtag	Rating	Timeslot Rank	Daytime Rank	Ref.
149	Stuck at the Forest	January 1, 2015	#TheHalfSisters	19.1%	#1	#2	
150	Lost Half Sisters	January 2, 2015	#THSLostHalfSisters	20.9%	#1	#1	
151	To the Rescue	January 5, 2015	#THSToTheRescue	19.9%	#1	#1	
152	Finding Forgiveness	January 6, 2015	#THSFindingForgiveness	18.1%	#1	#1	
153	The Slap	January 7, 2015	#THSTheSlap	18.0%	#1	#1	
154	Alfred Against the World	January 8, 2015	#THSAlfredAgainstTheWorld	19.4%	#1	#1	
155	Karma and Revenge	January 9, 2015	#THSKarmaAndRevenge	20.0%	#1	#1	
156	Tagumpay ni Alexa	January 12, 2015	#THSTagumpayNiAlexa	20.1%	#1	#1	
157	Happy Birthday, Alfred!	January 13, 2015	#THSHappyBirthdayAlfred	22.2%	#1	#1	
158	Rina's Wrath	January 14, 2015	#THSRinasWrath	22.0%	#1	#1	
159	Family Feud	January 15, 2015	#THSFamilyFeud	22.7%	#1	#1	
160	Cold Hearted Ashley	January 16, 2015	#THSColdHeartedAshley	21.3%	#1	#1	
161	Pakiusap ni Diana	January 19, 2015	#TheHalfSisters	19.4%	#1	#1	
162	Rina in Pain	January 20, 2015	#THSRinaInPain	19.9%	#1	#1	
163	Rina Gets Even	January 21, 2015	#THSRinaGetsEven	18.8%	#1	#1	
164	Lupit ni Diana	January 22, 2015	#THSLupitNiDiana	21.5%	#1	#1	
165	Tougher Rina	January 23, 2015	#THSTougherRina	21.6%	#1	#1	
166	Evil Alfred	January 26, 2015	#THSEvilAlfred	20.4%	#1	#1	
167	Suhol ni Rina	January 27, 2015	#THSSuholNiRina	19.8%	#1	#1	
168	Nice try, Alfred!	January 28, 2015	#THSNiceTryAlfred	19.6%	#1	#1	
169	Karma ni Alfred	January 29, 2015	#THSKarmaNiAlfred	23.3%	#1	#1	
170	Daughter's Love	January 30, 2015	#THSDaughtersLove	19.0%	#1	#1	

=== February 2015 ===
Episode		Original air date	Social Media Hashtag	AGB Nielsen Mega Manila Households in Television Homes			Ref.
Episode		Original air date	Social Media Hashtag	Rating	Timeslot Rank	Daytime Rank	Ref.
171	May Nagbabalik	February 2, 2015	#THSMayNagbabalik	20.0%	#1	#1	
172	Alfred's Bribe	February 3, 2015	#THSAlfredsBribe	20.0%	#1	#1	
173	Rina Sees Benjie	February 4, 2015	#THSRinaSeesBenjie	19.6%	#1	#1	
174	Rivals for Love	February 5, 2015	#THSRivalsForLove	21.2%	#1	#1	
175	Fake Benjie	February 6, 2015	#THSFakeBenjie	20.9%	#1	#1	
176	Rina in Doubt	February 9, 2015	#THSRinaInDoubt	18.8%	#1	#1	
177	The Pretenders	February 10, 2015	#THSThePretenders	18.8%	#1	#1	
178	The Real Benjie	February 11, 2015	#THSTheRealBenjie	19.3%	#1	#1	
179	Meet Ysabel Zuniga	February 12, 2015	#THSMeetYsabelZuniga	19.2%	#1	#1	
180	Will you marry me, Rina?	February 13, 2015	#THSWillYouMarryMeRina	18.7%	#1	#1	
181	Be careful, Rina!	February 16, 2015	#THSBeCarefulRina	19.0%	#1	#1	
182	Kwento ni Baste	February 17, 2015	#THSKwentoNiBaste	18.9%	#1	#1	
183	Friendship Over	February 18, 2015	#THSFriendshipOver	18.5%	#1	#1	
184	The Coincidence	February 19, 2015	#THSTheCoincidence	19.0%	#1	#2	
185	Level Up Baste	February 20, 2015	#THSLevelUpBaste	20.3%	#1	#1	
186	Ashley's Evil Plan	February 23, 2015	#THSAshleysEvilPlan	19.1%	#1	#1	
187	May the Best Man Win	February 24, 2015	#THSMayTheBestManWin	17.8%	#1	#1	
188	Karibal	February 25, 2015	#THSKaribal	18.7%	#1	#1	
189	Love and Lies	February 26, 2015	#THSLoveAndLies	18.1%	#1	#2	
190	True Colors	February 27, 2015	#THSTrueColors	18.9%	#1	#1	

=== March 2015 ===
Episode		Original air date	Social Media Hashtag	AGB Nielsen Mega Manila Households in Television Homes			Ref.
Episode		Original air date	Social Media Hashtag	Rating	Timeslot Rank	Daytime Rank	Ref.
191	Patibong ni Tonio	March 2, 2015	#TheHalfSisters	18.3%	#1	#1	
192	Ang Pagkikita	March 3, 2015	#THSAngPagkikita	17.7%	#1	#1	
193	Duda ni Diana	March 4, 2015	#THSDudaNiDiana	18.4%	#1	#1	
194	Second Thoughts	March 5, 2015	#THSSecondThoughts	19.3%	#1	#1	
195	True Love Prevails	March 6, 2015	#THSTrueLovePrevails	20.0%	#1	#1	
196	Bradley's Suspicion	March 9, 2015	#THSBradleysSuspicion	17.8%	#1	#2	
197	Pagbuko kay Noli	March 10, 2015	#THSPagbukoKayNoli	19.7%	#1	#1	
198	Wedding Day	March 11, 2015	#THSWeddingDay	21.9%	#1	#1	
199	Itigil ang Kasal	March 12, 2015	#THSItigilAngKasal	21.7%	#1	#1	
200	Bulilyasong Plano	March 13, 2015	#THSBulilyasongPlano	23.6%	#1	#1	
201	Resbak ni Rina	March 16, 2015	#THSResbakNiRina	21.0%	#1	#1	
202	Rescue Diana	March 17, 2015	#THSRescueDiana	20.6%	#1	#1	
203	Diana sa Bingit	March 18, 2015	#THSDianaSaBingit	21.1%	#1	#1	
204	The Search Continues	March 19, 2015	#THSTheSearchContinues	20.0%	#1	#1	
205	Full Force for Diana	March 20, 2015	#THSFullForceForDiana	22.1%	#1	#1	
206	Rina vs. Alfred	March 23, 2015	#THSRinaVSAlfred	22.5%	#1	#1	
207	Buried Alive	March 24, 2015	#THSBuriedAlive	22.4%	#1	#1	
208	Misleading Clues	March 25, 2015	#THSMisleadingClues	23.6%	#1	#1	
209	Ashley or Money?	March 26, 2015	#THSAshleyOrMoney	22.6%	#1	#1	
210	Diana Lives	March 27, 2015	#THSDianaLives	21.5%	#1	#1	
211	Ashley Strikes Back	March 30, 2015	#THSAshleyStrikesBack	22.3%	#1	#1	
212	Ashley and Rina's Face Off	March 31, 2015	#THSAshleyRinaFaceOff	24.8%	#1	#1	

=== April 2015 ===
Episode		Original air date	Social Media Hashtag	AGB Nielsen Mega Manila Households in Television Homes			Ref.
Episode		Original air date	Social Media Hashtag	Rating	Timeslot Rank	Daytime Rank	Ref.
213	Ashley's Karma	April 1, 2015	#THSAshleysKarma	23.9%	#1	#2	
214	Kapalaran ni Ashley	April 6, 2015	#THSKapalaranNiAshley	19.8%	#1	#1	
215	Ashley's Pride	April 7, 2015	#THSAshleysPride	22.2%	#1	#1	
216	Rina Visits Ysabel	April 8, 2015	#THSRinaVisitsYsabel	21.4%	#1	#1	
217	Ashley's New Life	April 9, 2015	#THSAshleysNewLife	21.4%	#1	#1	
218	Laban, Baste!	April 10, 2015	#THSLabanBaste	19.6%	#1	#1	
219	Kaya pa, Baste	April 13, 2015	#THSKayaPaBaste	20.5%	#1	#1	
220	Diana in Pain	April 14, 2015	#THSDianaInPain	20.8%	#1	#1	
221	Ysabel Meets Diana	April 15, 2015	#THSYsabelMeetsDiana	22.3%	#1	#1	
222	Rebelasyon kay Rina	April 16, 2015	#THSRebelasyonKayRina	22.5%	#1	#1	
223	Rebelasyon kay Ysabel	April 17, 2015	#THSRebelasyonKayYsabel	20.8%	#1	#1	
224	Pagbawi kay Benjie	April 20, 2015	#THSPagbawiKayBenjie	19.8%	#1	#1	
225	Kapit sa Patalim	April 21, 2015	#THSKapitSaPatalim	19.0%	#1	#2	
226	Alluring Athena	April 22, 2015	#THSAlluringAthena	20.5%	#1	#1	
227	Ysabel Meets Ashley	April 23, 2015	#THSYsabelMeetsAshley	21.9%	#1	#1	
228	Kampihan	April 24, 2015	#THSKampihan	22.4%	#1	#1	
229	Magkaribal	April 27, 2015	#THSMagkaribal	21.6%	#1	#1	
230	The Engagement	April 28, 2015	#THSTheEngagement	21.8%	#1	#1	
231	Stop Right Now	April 29, 2015	#THSStopRightNow	20.7%	#1	#1	
232	Chasing Ysabel	April 30, 2015	#THSChasingYsabel	19.4%	#1	#1	

=== May 2015 ===
Episode		Original air date	Social Media Hashtag	AGB Nielsen Mega Manila Households in Television Homes			Ref.
Episode		Original air date	Social Media Hashtag	Rating	Timeslot Rank	Daytime Rank	Ref.
233	Rina's Surprise Visit	May 1, 2015	#THSRinasSurpriseVisit	20.4%	#1	#1	
234	Pagtakas ni Ysabel	May 4, 2015	#THSPagtakasNiYsabel	19.8%	#1	#1	
235	Ysabel's Escape Plan	May 5, 2015	#THSYsabelsEscapePlan	20.4%	#1	#1	
236	Paninira ni Vanessa	May 6, 2015	#THSPaniniraNiVanessa	21.9%	#1	#1	
237	Sugod, Rina!	May 7, 2015	#THSSugodRina	21.0%	#1	#1	
238	Alaala ni Benjie	May 8, 2015	#THSAlaalaNiBenjie	21.0%	#1	#1	
239	Ysabel's Wrath	May 11, 2015	#THSYsabelsWrath	20.5%	#1	#1	
240	Truth or Dare	May 12, 2015	#THSTruthOrDare	19.9%	#1	#1	
241	Sa Simbahan ang Tuloy	May 13, 2015	#THSSaSimbahanAngTuloy	19.7%	#1	#1	
242	Desisyon ni Benjie	May 14, 2015	#THSDesisyonNiBenjie	21.3%	#1	#1	
243	Painful Encounter	May 15, 2015	#THSPainfulEncounter	19.7%	#1	#1	
244	Father and Daughter Moment	May 18, 2015	#THSFatherDaughterMoment	19.9%	#1	#1	
245	Finally Reunited	May 19, 2015	#THSFinallyReunited	19.9%	#1	#1	
246	Diana Moves On	May 20, 2015	#THSDianaMovesOn	19.9%	#1	#1	
247	Kasunduan	May 21, 2015	#THSKasunduan	18.9%	#1	#1	
248	Visiting Lupita	May 22, 2015	#THSVisitingLupita	19.8%	#1	#1	
249	The Kiss	May 25, 2015	#THSTheKiss	18.3%	#1	#1	
250	Clash of Lovers	May 26, 2015	#THSClashOfLovers	21.2%	#1	#2	
251	Ysabel's Backup Plan	May 27, 2015	#THSYsabelsBackUpPlan	21.0%	#1	#1	
252	Returning Memories	May 28, 2015	#THSReturningMemories	21.7%	#1	#1	
253	Benjie's Back	May 29, 2015	#THSBenjiesBack	20.5%	#1	#1	

=== June 2015 ===
Episode		Original air date	Social Media Hashtag	AGB Nielsen Mega Manila Households in Television Homes			Ref.
Episode		Original air date	Social Media Hashtag	Rating	Timeslot Rank	Daytime Rank	Ref.
254	Guilty Bradley	June 1, 2015	#THSGuiltyBradley	19.1%	#1	#1	
255	Wishful Diana	June 2, 2015	#THSWishfulDiana	20.3%	#1	#1	
256	Let the Love Begin	June 3, 2015	#THSLetTheLoveBegin	19.6%	#1	#1	
257	Meets DJ Jeni	June 4, 2015	#THSMeetsDJJeni	20.2%	#1	#1	
258	Hatol kay Alfred	June 5, 2015	#THSHatolKayAlfred	18.8%	#1	#1	
259	Kalagayan ni Ysabel	June 8, 2015	#THSKalagayanNiYsabel	18.1%	#1	#1	
260	Torn Between Lovers	June 9, 2015	#THSTornBetweenLovers	18.6%	#1	#1	
261	Goodbye, Bradley	June 10, 2015	#THSGoodbyeBradley	18.1%	#1	#1	
262	Letting Go	June 11, 2015	#THSLettingGo	18.0%	#1	#2	
263	Somebody Save Diana	June 12, 2015	#THSSomebodySaveDiana	18.5%	#1	#2	
264	Rina's Guilt	June 15, 2015	#THSRinasGuilt	17.9%	#1	#1	
265	Rina Visits Ysabel	June 16, 2015	#THSRinaVisitsYsabel	17.7%	#1	#1	
266	The Great Escape	June 17, 2015	#THSTheGreatEscape	18.4%	#1	#1	
267	New Strategy	June 18, 2015	#THSNewStrategy	16.8%	#1	#1	
268	Pagtakas	June 19, 2015	#THSPagtakas	17.4%	#1	#2	
269	Taken	June 22, 2015	#THSTaken	17.8%	#1	#1	
270	Go away, Bradley!	June 23, 2015	#THSGoAwayBradley	17.1%	#1	#2	
271	Benjie in Danger	June 24, 2015	#THSBenjieInDanger	19.5%	#1	#1	
272	Paghaharap	June 25, 2015	#THSPaghaharap	18.6%	#1	#1	
273	Right Love, Wrong Time	June 26, 2015	#THSRightLoveWrongTime	18.8%	#1	#1	
274	Drinking About You	June 29, 2015	#THSDrinkingAboutYou	18.5%	#1	#1	
275	Jacky in Disguise	June 30, 2015	#THSJackyInDisguise	17.0%	#1	#2	

=== July 2015 ===
Episode		Original air date	Social Media Hashtag	AGB Nielsen Mega Manila Households in Television Homes			Ref.
Episode		Original air date	Social Media Hashtag	Rating	Timeslot Rank	Daytime Rank	Ref.
276	Meet Estrella	July 1, 2015	#THSMeetEstrella	16.4%	#1	#2	
277	Duda ni Venus	July 2, 2015	#THSDudaNiVenus	16.4%	#1	#2	
278	Selos ni Diana	July 3, 2015	#THSSelosNiDiana	17.1%	#1	#2	
279	Kasabwat ni Ashley	July 6, 2015	#THSKasabwatNiAshley	21.5%	#1	#2	
280	Surprise Visitor	July 7, 2015	#THSSurpriseVisitor	17.6%	#1	#2	
281	Paramdam ni Ambo	July 8, 2015	#THSParamdamNiAmbo	18.8%	#1	#2	
282	Selos ni Bradley	July 9, 2015	#THSSelosNiBradley	21.5%	#1	#2	
283	Friendzoned	July 10, 2015	#THSFriendzoned	20.6%	#1	#2	
284	Suspicions	July 13, 2015	#THSSuspicions	17.5%	#1	#2	
285	Car Crash	July 14, 2015	#THSCarCrash	18.0%	#1	#2	
286	Huli ka, Jacky!	July 15, 2015	#THSHuliKaJacky	18.7%	#1	#2	
287	Hotel Anniversary	July 16, 2015	#THSHotelAnniversary	20.1%	#1	#2	
288	Escape Plan	July 17, 2015	#THSEscapePlan	20.6%	#1	#2	
289	Full Force for Ashley	July 20, 2015	#THSFullForceForAshley	20.2%	#1	#2	
290	Meet Malcolm	July 21, 2015	#THSMeetMalcolm	19.0%	#1	#2	
291	Airport Trouble	July 22, 2015	#THSAirportTrouble	21.7%	#1	#2	
292	The Half Sisters' Goes to Japan	July 23, 2015	#THSGoesToJapan	20.9%	#1	#2	
293	Bradley in Japan	July 24, 2015	#THSBradleyInJapan	21.4%	#1	#3	
294	The Great Tokyo Search	July 27, 2015	#THSTheGreatTokyoSearch	20.1%	#1	#2	
295	Rescuing Ashley	July 28, 2015	#THSRescuingAshley	20.0%	#1	#2	
296	Ashley Meets Master	July 29, 2015	#THSAshleyMeetsMaster	20.1%	#1	#2	
297	Half Sisters in Danger	July 30, 2015	#THSHalfSistersInDanger	19.4%	#1	#2	
298	Ashley Saves Diana	July 31, 2015	#THSAshleySavesDiana	20.8%	#1	#2	

=== August 2015 ===
Episode		Original air date	Social Media Hashtag	AGB Nielsen Mega Manila Households in Television Homes			Ref.
Episode		Original air date	Social Media Hashtag	Rating	Timeslot Rank	Daytime Rank	Ref.
299	Laban, Kambal!	August 3, 2015	#THSLabanKambal	20.8%	#1	#2	
300	Twins for Auction	August 4, 2015	#THSTwinsForAuction	20.1%	#1	#2	
301	Thank you, Malcolm	August 5, 2015	#THSThankYouMalcolm	22.8%	#1	#2	
302	Alfred Strikes Back	August 6, 2015	#THSAlfredStrikesBack	21.7%	#1	#2	
303	Happy Reunion	August 7, 2015	#THSHappyReunion	21.6%	#1	#2	
304	Ashley's Choice	August 10, 2015	#THSAshleysChoice	22.0%	#1	#2	
305	Father Face Off	August 11, 2015	#THSFatherFaceOff	22.8%	#1	#2	
306	Meet Magnolia McBride	August 12, 2015	#THSMeetMagnoliaMcBride	23.5%	#1	#2	
307	Magnolia Invades	August 13, 2015	#THSMagnoliaInvades	22.7%	#1	#2	
308	Prodigal Daughter	August 14, 2015	#THSProdigalDaughter	20.1%	#1	#2	
309	Bintang kay Diana	August 17, 2015	#THSBintangKayDiana	21.1%	#1	#2	
310	Fight for Bradley	August 18, 2015	#THSFightForBradley	19.8%	#1	#2	
311	Rina's Downfall	August 19, 2015	#THSRinasDownfall	19.6%	#1	#2	
312	Elizabeth's Discovery	August 20, 2015	#THSElizabethsDiscovery	20.3%	#1	#2	
313	The Slap	August 21, 2015	#THSTheSlap	21.9%	#1	#2	
314	Bradley's Promise	August 24, 2015	#THSBradleysPromise	20.7%	#1	#2	
315	Tagapagmana	August 25, 2015	#THSTagapagmana	19.2%	#1	#2	
316	Kayod, Ashley!	August 26, 2015	#THSKayodAshley	19.7%	#1	#2	
317	Stubborn Daughter	August 27, 2015	#THSStubbornDaughter	20.2%	#1	#2	
318	Help Elizabeth	August 28, 2015	#THSHelpElizabeth	18.6%	#1	#2	
319	Joaquin Saves the Day	August 31, 2015	#THSJoaquinSavesTheDay	21.5%	#1	#2	

=== September 2015 ===
Episode		Original air date	Social Media Hashtag	AGB Nielsen Mega Manila Households in Television Homes			Ref.
Episode		Original air date	Social Media Hashtag	Rating	Timeslot Rank	Daytime Rank	Ref.
320	Birthday Preparation	September 1, 2015	#THSBirthdayPreparation	18.7%	#1	#2	
321	Happy B-day Half Sisters	September 2, 2015	#THSHappyBdayHalfSisters	19.6%	#1	#2	
322	Party Crasher	September 3, 2015	#THSPartyCrasher	18.8%	#1	#2	
323	Rescue Ashley	September 4, 2015	#THSRescueAshley	17.3%	#1	#2	
324	Taking Back Ashley	September 7, 2015	#THSTakingBackAshley	19.4%	#1	#2	
325	Goodbye, Jacky	September 8, 2015	#THSGoodbyeJacky	21.1%	#1	#2	
326	Catching Alfred	September 9, 2015	#THSCatchingAlfred	20.7%	#1	#2	
327	Diana's Surprise	September 10, 2015	#THSDianasSurprise	21.1%	#1	#2	
328	Bradley's Cousin	September 11, 2015	#THSBradleysCousin	20.3%	#1	#2	
329	Joaquin vs. Bradley	September 14, 2015	#THSJoaquinVSBradley	20.0%	#1	#2	
330	Da Moves ni Bradley	September 15, 2015	#THSDaMovesNiBradley	19.0%	#1	#2	
331	Fight for Diana	September 16, 2015	#THSFightForDiana	20.0%	#1	#2	
332	Joaquin to the Rescue	September 17, 2015	#THSJoaquinToTheRescue	20.2%	#1	#2	
333	Pagsagip	September 18, 2015	#THSPagsagip	18.1%	#1	#2	
334	Payback Time	September 21, 2015	#THSPaybackTime	18.8%	#1	#3	
335	Duda ni Diana	September 22, 2015	#THSDudaNiDiana	18.8%	#1	#2	
336	Pagsubok kay Bradley	September 23, 2015	#THSPagsubokKayBradley	17.6%	#1	#3	
337	Cousin Conflict	September 24, 2015	#THSCousinConflict	18.7%	#1	#3	
338	Away ng Mag-pinsan	September 25, 2015	#TheHalfSisters	19.6%	#1	#3	
339	Bradley's Request	September 28, 2015	#THSBradleysRequest	19.9%	#1	#2	
340	Just One Day	September 29, 2015	#THSJustOneDay	17.0%	#1	#2	
341	Wedding Day	September 30, 2015	#THSWeddingDay	19.2%	#1	#3	

=== October 2015 ===
Episode		Original air date	Social Media Hashtag	AGB Nielsen Mega Manila Households in Television Homes			Ref.
Episode		Original air date	Social Media Hashtag	Rating	Timeslot Rank	Daytime Rank	Ref.
342	Wedding Crasher	October 1, 2015	#THSWeddingCrasher	19.1%	#1	#3	
343	Joaquin Says Sorry	October 2, 2015	#THSJoaquinSaysSorry	20.5%	#1	#3	
344	Truth About Bradley	October 5, 2015	#THSTruthAboutBradley	19.7%	#1	#3	
345	Bilin ni Bradley	October 6, 2015	#THSBilinNiBradley	16.8%	#1	#3	
346	Be Careful, Rina!	October 7, 2015	#THSBeCarefulRina	17.4%	#1	#3	
347	Goodbye, Magnolia	October 8, 2015	#THSGoodbyeMagnolia	16.9%	#1	#3	
348	Rina Behind Bars	October 9, 2015	#THSRinaBehindBars	17.0%	#1	#3	
349	Leave Without Goodbye	October 12, 2015	#THSLeaveWithoutGoodbye	19.5%	#1	#2	
350	Sino si Eduardo?	October 13, 2015	#THSSinoSiEduardo	16.9%	#1	#4	
351	Doubting Diana	October 14, 2015	#THSDoubtingDiana	18.3%	#1	#3	
352	Be Careful, Ashley!	October 15, 2015	#THSBeCarefulAshley	18.8%	#1	#2	
353	Prison Riot	October 16, 2015	#THSPrisonRiot	18.8%	#1	#2	
354	Hurting Diana	October 19, 2015	#THSHurtingDiana	17.5%	#1	#4	
355	The Witness	October 20, 2015	#THSTheWitness	20.2%	#1	#2	
356	Engaged	October 21, 2015	#THSEngaged	19.2%	#1	#2	
357	Pamamanhikan	October 22, 2015	#THSPamamanhikan	17.1%	#1	#2	
358	Here Comes the Bride	October 23, 2015	#THSHereComesTheBride	18.7%	#1	#2	
359	The Wedding	October 26, 2015	#THSTheWedding	20.7%	#1	#2	
360	The Unexpected	October 27, 2015	#THSTheUnexpected	18.8%	#1	#3	
361	Don't give up, Bradley!	October 28, 2015	#THSDontGiveUpBradley	18.4%	#1	#3	
362	Goodbye for Now	October 29, 2015	#THSGoodbyeForNow	17.0%	#1	#3	
363	Bye, Bradley	October 30, 2015	#THSByeBradley	18.3%	#1	#2	

=== November 2015 ===
Episode		Original air date	Social Media Hashtag	AGB Nielsen Mega Manila Households in Television Homes			Ref.
Episode		Original air date	Social Media Hashtag	Rating	Timeslot Rank	Daytime Rank	Ref.
364	Muling Paghaharap	November 2, 2015	#THSMulingPaghaharap	18.1%	#1	#3	
365	Benjie in Danger	November 3, 2015	#THSBenjieInDanger	18.7%	#1	#2	
366	Goodbye, Benjie	November 4, 2015	#THSGoodbyeBenjie	18.8%	#1	#2	
367	Runaway Ashley	November 5, 2015	#THSRunawayAshley	17.6%	#1	#2	
368	Ashley and Alfred's Face Off	November 6, 2015	#THSAshleyAlfredFaceOff	19.4%	#1	#2	
369	Galit ni Diana	November 9, 2015	#THSGalitNiDiana	18.7%	#1	#2	
370	Unstoppable Alfred	November 10, 2015	#THSUnstoppableAlfred	18.0%	#1	#2	
371	Good Friend Joaquin	November 11, 2015	#THSGoodFriendJoaquin	18.2%	#1	#2	
372	New Chapter	November 12, 2015	#THSNewChapter	17.5%	#1	#2	
373	May Nagbabalik	November 13, 2015	#THSMayNagbabalik	18.7%	#1	#3	
374	Welcome back, Bradley!	November 16, 2015	#THSWelcomeBackBradley	17.8%	#1	#3	
375	The Comeback	November 17, 2015	#THSTheComeback	19.1%	#1	#2	
376	Rina's Condition	November 18, 2015	#THSRinasCondition	19.3%	#1	#2	
377	Missing Mommy	November 19, 2015	#THSMissingMommy	17.6%	#1	#3	
378	Bradley Moves On	November 20, 2015	#THSBradleyMovesOn	19.5%	#1	#3	
379	Meet Dr. Santi	November 23, 2015	#THSMeetDrSanti	17.8%	#1	#2	
380	Get well soon, Rina!	November 24, 2015	#THSGetWellSoonRina	17.8%	#1	#3	
381	Guilty Santi	November 25, 2015	#THSGuiltySanti	18.4%	#1	#2	
382	Truth About Santi	November 26, 2015	#THSTruthAboutSanti	16.9%	#1	#3	
383	Moving On	November 27, 2015	#THSMovingOn	17.8%	#1	#2	
384	Mistake for a Night	November 30, 2015	#THSMistakeForANight	20.8%	#1	#2	

=== December 2015 ===
Episode		Original air date	Social Media Hashtag	AGB Nielsen Mega Manila Households in Television Homes			Ref.
Episode		Original air date	Social Media Hashtag	Rating	Timeslot Rank	Daytime Rank	Ref.
385	Just for a Night	December 1, 2015	#THSJustForANight	19.2%	#1	#2	
386	Guilty Ashley	December 2, 2015	#THSGuiltyAshley	17.9%	#1	#2	
387	Diana to the Rescue	December 3, 2015	#THSDianaToTheRescue	19.4%	#1	#2	
388	Rina Remembers	December 4, 2015	#THSRinaRemembers	18.5%	#1	#2	
389	Ashley's Symptoms	December 7, 2015	#THSAshleysSymptoms	17.9%	#1	#2	
390	Alfred's New Identity	December 8, 2015	#THSAlfredsNewIdentity	19.4%	#1	#2	
391	Nagdadalang Tao	December 9, 2015	#THSNagdadalangTao	16.1%	#1	#2	
392	Pagbabalikan	December 10, 2015	#THSPagbabalikan	16.9%	#1	#2	
393	Plan of Revenge	December 11, 2015	#THSPlanOfRevenge	18.0%	#1	#2	
394	Ashley's Plan	December 14, 2015	#THSAshleysPlan	18.6%	#1	#2	
395	Pagsubok kay Bradley	December 15, 2015	#THSPagsubokKayBradley	21.0%	#1	#2	
396	Come Home, Ashley!	December 16, 2015	#THSComeHomeAshley	20.6%	#1	#2	
397	Gulo sa Resto	December 17, 2015	#THSGuloSaResto	16.7%	#1	#2	
398	Baby Daddy	December 18, 2015	#THSBabyDaddy	17.5%	#1	#2	
399	One Big Lie	December 21, 2015	#TheHalfSisters	17.6%	#1	#2	
400	Truth is Out	December 22, 2015	#THSTruthIsOut	17.2%	#1	#2	
401	Diana's Shattered Heart	December 23, 2015	#TheHalfSisters	18.6%	#1	#2	
402	Bradley Asks for Forgiveness	December 24, 2015	#TheHalfSisters	17.6%	#1	#2	
403	The Half Sisters' Christmas	December 25, 2015	#TheHalfSistersChristmas	14.2%	#1	#2	
404	Diana's Pride	December 28, 2015	#THSDianasPride	17.6%	#1	#2	
405	Unforgivable Mistake	December 29, 2015	#THSUnforgivableMistake	16.3%	#1	#2	
406	Alfred's Revenge	December 30, 2015	#THSAlfredsRevenge	16.0%	#1	#2	
407	Diana Forgives Ashley	December 31, 2015	#TheHalfSisters	13.5%	#1	#2	

=== January 2016 ===
Episode		Original air date	Social Media Hashtag	AGB Nielsen Mega Manila Households in Television Homes			Ref.
Episode		Original air date	Social Media Hashtag	Rating	Timeslot Rank	Daytime Rank	Ref.
408	Calm After the Storm	January 1, 2016	#THSCalmAfterTheStorm	16.6%	#1	#2	
409	Forgiveness	January 4, 2016	#THSForgiveness	16.8%	#1	#2	
410	Don't give up, Ashley!	January 5, 2016	#THSDontGiveUpAshley	17.5%	#1	#2	
411	Unconditional Love	January 6, 2016	#THSUnconditionalLove	15.7%	#1	#2	
412	Cielo Eskandalo	January 7, 2016	#THSCieloEskandalo	16.3%	#1	#2	
413	Joaquin's New Chapter	January 8, 2016	#THSJoaquinsNewChapter	17.5%	#1	#2	
414	In Danger	January 11, 2016	#THSInDanger	17.1%	#1	#2	
415	Ganti kay Rina	January 12, 2016	#THSGantiKayRina	17.2%	#1	#2	
416	Taken	January 13, 2016	#THSTaken	17.2%	#1	#2	
417	Truth Revealed	January 14, 2016	#THSTruthRevealed	20.7%	#1	#2	
418	Finale	January 15, 2016	#TheHalfSistersFinale	23.2%	#1	#2	
