= List of Let the Love Begin episodes =

TV episode list

Let the Love Begin is a 2015 Philippine television drama romantic comedy series broadcast by GMA Network. It premiered on the network's Telebabad line up and worldwide via GMA Pinoy TV from May 4, 2015 to August 7, 2015, replacing Once Upon a Kiss.

Mega Manila ratings are provided by AGB Nielsen Philippines.

== Series overview ==
Month	Episodes	Monthly Averages
Month	Episodes	Mega Manila
May 2015	20	18.8%
June 2015	22	17.9%
July 2015	23	18.5%
August 2015	5	20.4%
Total	70	18.9%

== Episodes ==
=== May 2015 ===
Episode		Original air date	Social Media Hashtag	AGB Nielsen Mega Manila Households in Television Homes			Ref.
Episode		Original air date	Social Media Hashtag	Rating	Timeslot Rank	Primetime Rank	Ref.
1	Pilot	May 4, 2015	#LetTheLoveBegin	19.7%	#2	#5	
2	Gardo Rescues Aiai	May 5, 2015	#LTLBGardoRescuesAiai	19.4%	#2	#4	
3	Jeni Basted	May 6, 2015	#LTLBJeniBasted	18.4%	#2	#5	
4	Goodbye, bes!	May 7, 2015	#LTLBGoodbyeBes	18.0%	#2	#6	
5	GabRu na	May 8, 2015	#LTLBGabRuNa	19.1%	#2	#4	
6	Worlds Apart	May 11, 2015	#LTLBWorldsApart	20.8%	#1	#2	
7	Aso't Pusa	May 12, 2015	#LTLBAsotPusa	18.9%	#2	#5	
8	Hate at First Sight	May 13, 2015	#LTLBHateAtFirstSight	17.9%	#2	#4	
9	Jeni and Tony Reunited	May 14, 2015	#LTLBJeniTonyReunited	19.9%	#2	#2	
10	Jeni vs. Katy	May 15, 2015	#LTLBJeniVSKaty	17.7%	#2	#5	
11	Rivalries	May 18, 2015	#LTLBRivalries	19.5%	#2	#4	
12	Away Bati	May 19, 2015	#LTLBAwayBati	19.6%	#2	#3	
13	Pia Erick Booklat	May 20, 2015	#PiaErickBooklat	18.5%	#2	#4	
14	Happy Erick	May 21, 2015	#LTLBHappyErick	18.0%	#2	#4	
15	Pia Defends Erick	May 22, 2015	#LTLBPiaDefendsErick	17.9%	#2	#5	
16	Pia Away with Erick	May 25, 2015	#LTLBPiaAwayWithErick	19.2%	#2	#4	
17	Pia Grounded	May 26, 2015	#LTLBPiaGrounded	18.0%	#2	#4	
18	Surprise Reunion	May 27, 2015	#LTLBSurpriseReunion	18.7%	#2	#4	
19	Awkward Moments	May 28, 2015	#LTLBAwkwardMoments	18.9%	#2	#3	
20	Royal Rumble	May 29, 2015	#LTLBRoyalRumble	17.8%	#2	#4	

=== June 2015 ===
Episode		Original air date	Social Media Hashtag	AGB Nielsen Mega Manila Households in Television Homes			Ref.
Episode		Original air date	Social Media Hashtag	Rating	Timeslot Rank	Primetime Rank	Ref.
21	Demandahan	June 1, 2015	#LTLBDemandahan	18.6%	#2	#4	
22	Brave Erick	June 2, 2015	#LTLBBraveErick	20.0%	#2	#3	
23	Romeo and Juliet	June 3, 2015	#LTLBRomeAndJuliet	15.9%	#2	#5	
24	Romeo and Juliet 2	June 4, 2015	#LTLBRomeAndJuliet2	18.3%	#2	#4	
25	Pia's Mom is Back	June 5, 2015	#LTLBPiasMomIsBack	18.5%	#2	#5	
26	Tony and Sofie Reunited	June 8, 2015	#LTLBTonySofieReunited	17.3%	#2	#6	
27	The Ex is Back	June 9, 2015	#LTLBTheExIsBack	17.5%	#2	#4	
28	Hello, 1D!	June 10, 2015	#LTLBHello1D	17.3%	#2	#5	
29	Tony Loves Sofie	June 11, 2015	#LTLBTonyLovesSofie	17.1%	#2	#4	
30	Hulog sa Bangin	June 12, 2015	#LTLBHulogSaBangin	18.6%	#2	#4	
31	Hold on, Tony!	June 15, 2015	#LTLBHoldOnTony	18.7%	#2	#4	
32	Laban lang, Tony!	June 16, 2015	#LTLBLabanLangTony	18.0%	#2	#5	
33	Celeste and Sofie Rumble	June 17, 2015	#LTLBCelesteSofieRumble	17.4%	#2	#6	
34	Pagpapanggap ni Luchie	June 18, 2015	#LTLBPagpapanggapNiLuchie	16.8%	#2	#5	
35	Yaya Eds's Revelation	June 19, 2015	#LTLBYayaEdsRevelation	19.3%	#2	#5	
36	Jeni to the Rescue	June 22, 2015	#LTLBJeniToTheRescue	17.1%	#2	#6	
37	Pia to Meet Sofie	June 23, 2015	#PiaToMeetSofie	18.2%	#2	#5	
38	Hadlang sa Pagkikita	June 24, 2015	#LTLBHadlangSaPagkikita	16.4%	#2	#5	
39	Kalupitan ni Celeste	June 25, 2015	#LTLBKalupitanNiCeleste	18.3%	#2	#4	
40	Jeni and Katy: Round 2	June 26, 2015	#LTLBJeniAndKatyRound2	17.6%	#2	#6	
41	Erick to the Rescue	June 29, 2015	#LTLBErickToTheRescue	18.0%	#2	#5	
42	The Accident	June 30, 2015	#LTLBTheAccident	18.3%	#2	#4	

=== July 2015 ===
Episode		Original air date	Social Media Hashtag	AGB Nielsen Mega Manila Households in Television Homes			Ref.
Episode		Original air date	Social Media Hashtag	Rating	Timeslot Rank	Primetime Rank	Ref.
43	Get well soon, Pia!	July 1, 2015	#LTLBGetWellSoonPia	17.9%	#2	#4	
44	Pagtakas ni Pia	July 2, 2015	#LTLBPagtakasNiPia	19.1%	#2	#3	
45	Mother and Daughter Reunited	July 3, 2015	#LTLBMotherDaughterReunited	17.1%	#2	#5	
46	End of a Friendship	July 6, 2015	#LTLBEndOfAFriendship	20.1%	#2	#4	
47	I love Pia!	July 7, 2015	#LTLBILovePia	18.7%	#2	#6	
48	Pananakot kina Jeni	July 8, 2015	#LTLBPananakotKinaJeni	17.6%	#2	#7	
49	Operation Save Tony	July 9, 2015	#LTLBOperationSaveTony	18.2%	#2	#7	
50	Wanted: Sophie	July 10, 2015	#LTLBWantedSophie	19.7%	#2	#6	
51	Reunited	July 13, 2015	#LTLBReunited	17.6%	#2	#6	
52	One Million Reward	July 14, 2015	#LTLBOneMillionReward	17.4%	#2	#6	
53	Tumakas ka, Pia!	July 15, 2015	#LTLBTumakasKaPia	17.2%	#2	#6	
54	Uno Likes Pia	July 16, 2015	#LTLBUnoLikesPia	17.3%	#2	#7	
55	Pagpapanggap ni Uno	July 17, 2015	#LTLBPagpapanggapNiUno	15.8%	#2	#6	
56	Thankful Sophie	July 20, 2015	#LTLBThankfulSophie	18.6%	#2	#5	
57	Jealous Erick	July 21, 2015	#LTLBJealousErick	17.9%	#2	#6	
58	Jom Loves Jeni	July 22, 2015	#LTLBJomLovesJeni	17.3%	#2	#7	
59	The Real 1D	July 23, 2015	#LTLBTheReal1D	18.6%	#2	#6	
60	Jeni Helps Tony	July 24, 2015	#LTLBJeniHelpsTony	20.4%	#2	#3	
61	Harana kay Pia	July 27, 2015	#LTLBHaranaKayPia	19.2%	#2	#5	
62	I'm sorry, Pia	July 28, 2015	#LTLBImSorryPia	19.5%	#2	#5	
63	Undecided Jeni	July 29, 2015	#LTLBUndecidedJeni	20.8%	#2	#4	
64	Man of the House	July 30, 2015	#LTLBManOfTheHouse	20.2%	#2	#3	
65	Father and Son Reunited	July 31, 2015	#LTLBFatherSonReunited	19.7%	#2	#2	

=== August 2015 ===
Episode		Original air date	Social Media Hashtag	AGB Nielsen Mega Manila Households in Television Homes			Ref.
Episode		Original air date	Social Media Hashtag	Rating	Timeslot Rank	Primetime Rank	Ref.
66	Sakit ni Enrico	August 3, 2015	#LTLBSakitNiEnrico	18.9%	#2	#6	
67	Tony Rejects Celeste	August 4, 2015	#LTLBTonyRejectsCeleste	19.2%	#2	#6	
68	The Accident	August 5, 2015	#LTLBTheAccident	21.0%	#2	#2	
69	Hold on, Enrico!	August 6, 2015	#LTLBHoldOnEnrico	21.0%	#2	#3	
70	Don't Worry, Smile Parati!	August 7, 2015	#DontWorrySmileParati	22.1%	#1	#1	
