= TODA One I Love =

2019 Philippine television drama series

- Title card
- Also known as: To the One I Love
- Genre: Political drama; Romantic comedy
- Created by: Joselito delos Reyes; Jaileen Jimeno
- Written by: Volta delos Santos; Abet Padagdagan Raz; Leilani Chavez; Mario Banzon; Aya Anunciacion
- Directed by: Jeffrey Hidalgo; Nick Olanka
- Starring: Kylie Padilla; Ruru Madrid
- Theme music composer: Natasha L. Correos
- Opening theme: "Magkunwari" by December Avenue
- Ending theme: "Sana sa Huli" by Ruru Madrid
- Country of origin: Philippines
- Original language: Tagalog
- No. of episodes: 53

Production
- Executive producer: John Mychal Alabado Feraren
- Cinematography: Maisa Demetillo; Joseph delos Reyes
- Editors: John Wesley Lagdameo; Thea Lauren Daguman; Mikko Valerie Dagar
- Camera setup: Multiple-camera setup
- Running time: 26–39 minutes
- Production company: GMA News and Public Affairs

Original release
- Network: GMA Network
- Release: February 4 – April 17, 2019

TODA One I Love (international title: To the One I Love) is a 2019 Philippine television drama political romantic comedy series broadcast on GMA Network. Directed by Jeffrey Hidalgo and Nick Olanka, it stars Ruru Madrid and Kylie Padilla. It premiered on February 4, 2019 on the network's Telebabad line up. The series concluded on April 17, 2019, with a total of 53 episodes.

The series is streaming online on YouTube.

== Premise ==
Set in San Bernabe, where two elections are underway; officers of the local Tricycle Owners and Drivers' Association and the new mayor. Involved in both elections is Gelay Dimagiba, who takes over her father's battles and his tricycle after he is murdered.

== Cast and characters ==
Cast

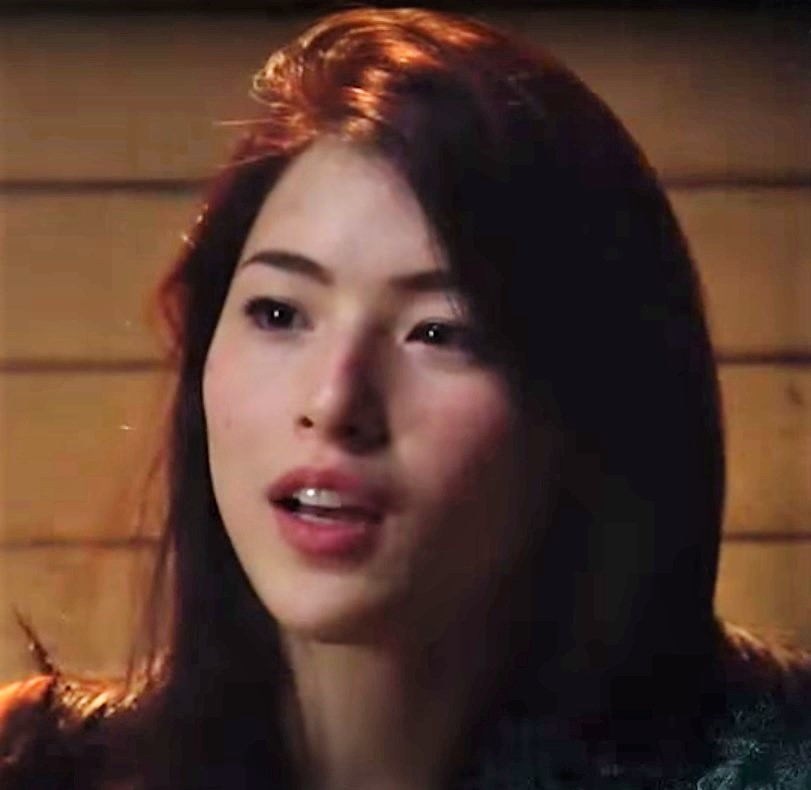
Kylie Padilla

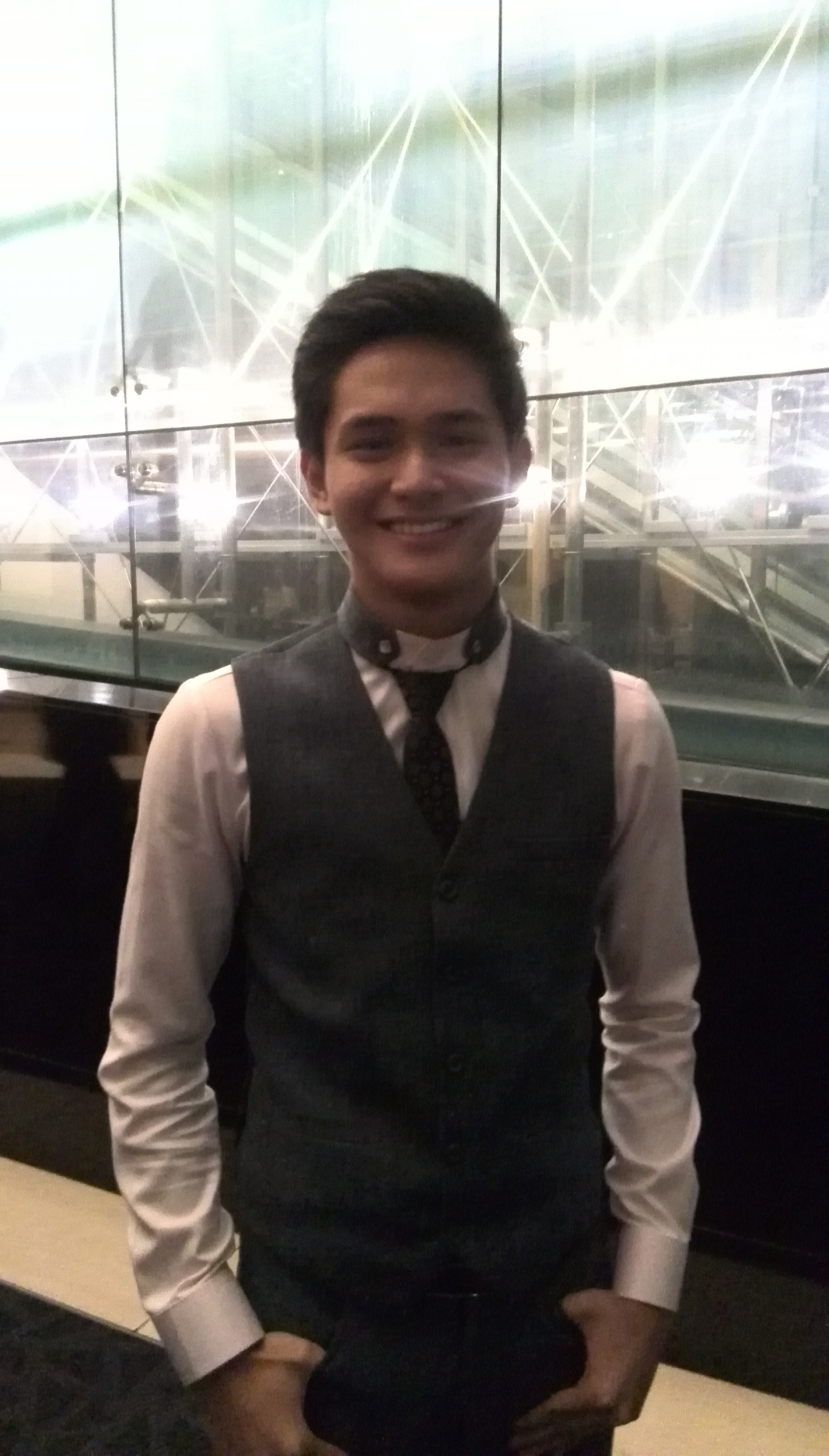
Ruru Madrid

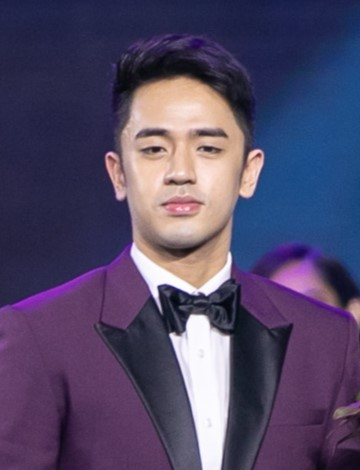
David Licauco

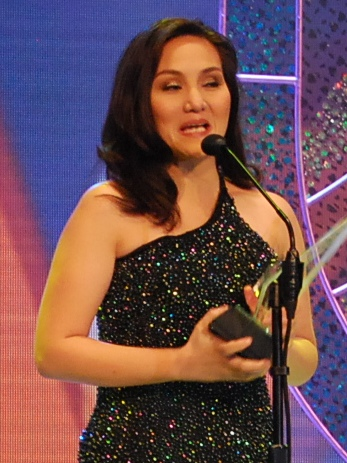
Gladys Reyes

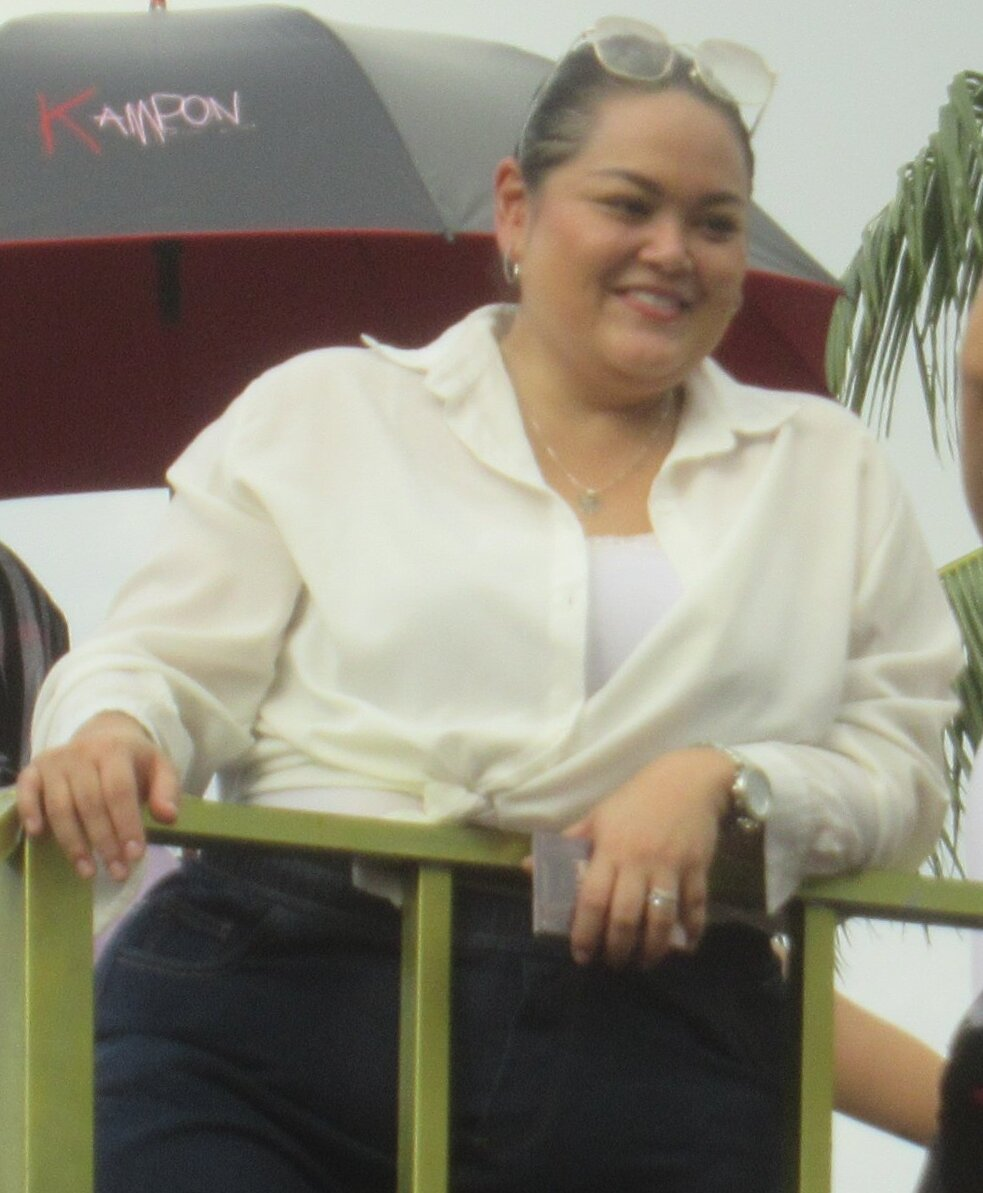
Cai Cortez

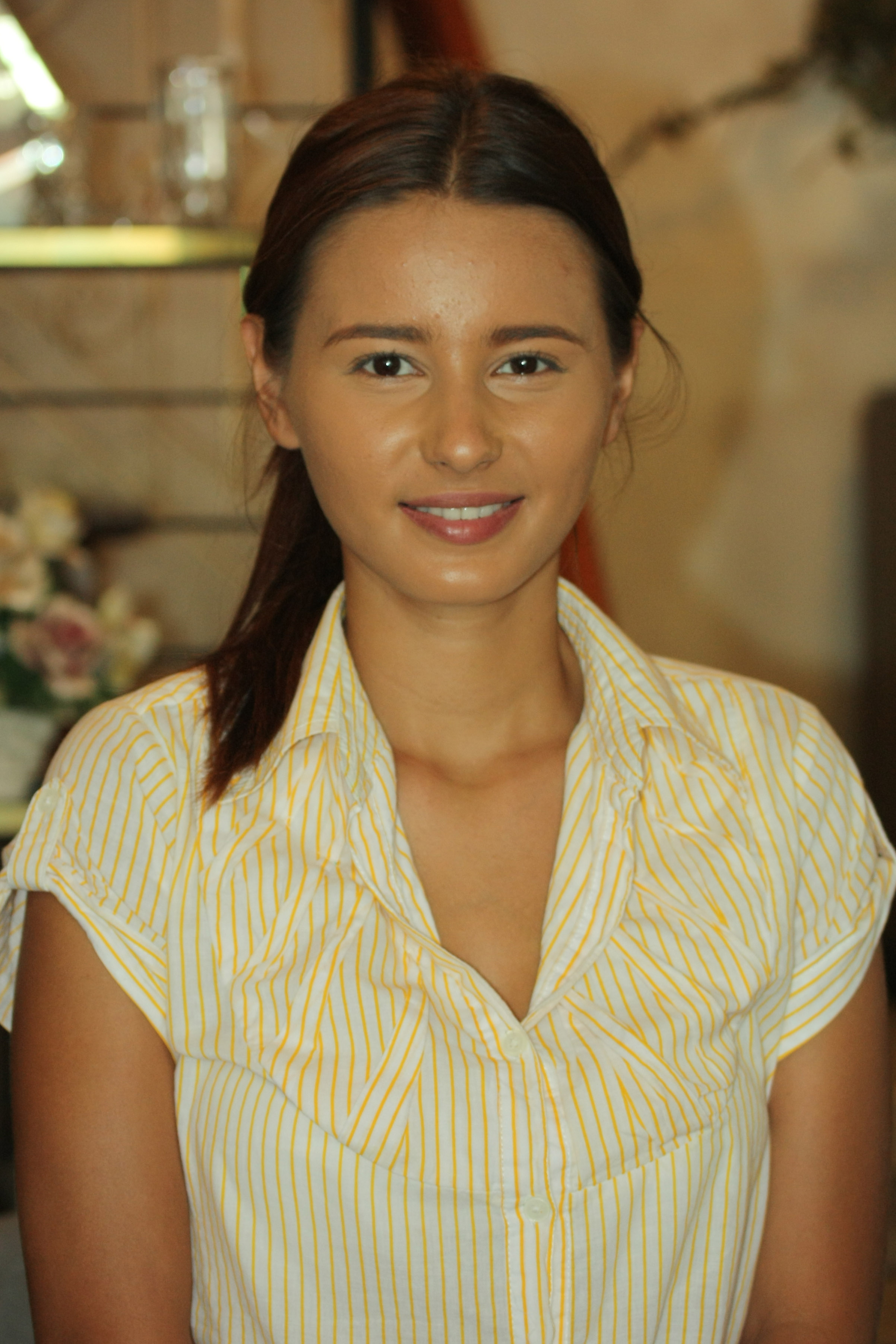
Jackie Rice

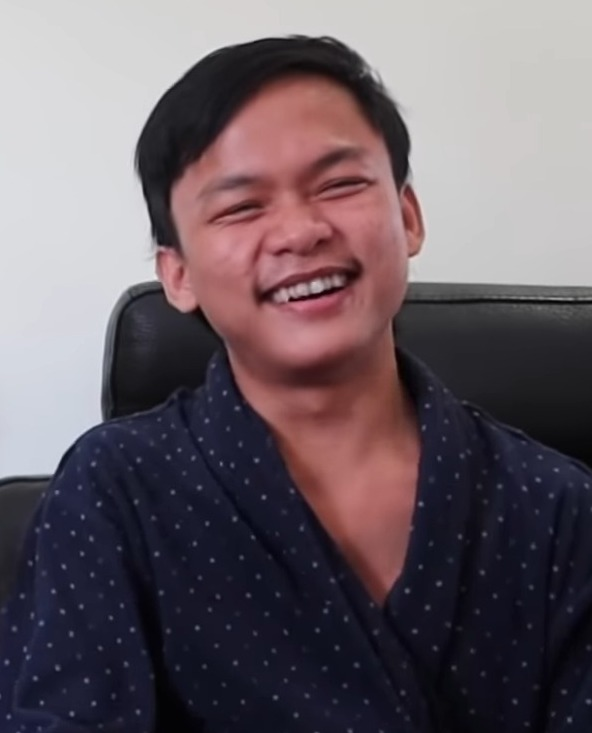
Buboy Villar

Lead cast

- Kylie Padilla as Angela "Gelay" H. Dimagiba-Magsino
- Ruru Madrid as Raymond "Emong" Magsino

Supporting cast

- David Licauco as Kobe T. Generoso
- Victor Neri as Miguel "Migs" Generoso
- Gladys Reyes as Dyna Tuazon-Generoso
- Cai Cortez as Josefina "Finny" Rogers Obrero
- Jackie Rice as Tiffany "Tiffy" Obrero
- Maureen Larrazabal as Jane Magsino
- Tina Paner as Lea Hofilena-Dimagiba
- Raymond Bagatsing as Jessie Magsino
- Ayeesha Cervantes as Rachel H. Dimagiba
- Bruce Roeland as Anthony "Utoy" H. Dimagiba
- Buboy Villar as Bogart Cruz
- Kimpoy Feliciano as Dino Magsino
- Archie Alemania as Kevin
- Kim Domingo as Vicky

Guest cast

- Divine Aucina as Diyosa
- Arvic Tan as Tonny
- Joel Palencia as Tonyo
- Tommy Peñaflor as Troy
- Kevin Sagra as Jonas
- Gerhard Acao as Tintoy
- JJ Arao
- Scarlet James
- Baymax
- Katrina Halili as Georgina Ferreira / Gregoria "Oriang" Catacutan
- Christopher de Leon as Enrique Sixto
- Jaclyn Jose as Princess
- Denise Barbacena as younger Dyna
- Lianne Valentin as younger Georgina
- Ping Medina as Piping
- Sofia Pablo as younger Gelay
- Dentrix Ponce as younger Emong
- Allen Dizon as Joselito "Tolits" Dimagiba
- Odette Khan as Tasing
- Ashley Rivera
- Isabelle de Leon as Magnolia
- Boobay as Britney
- Phytos Ramirez as Nonoy
- Rodjun Cruz as Robert
- Christopher Roxas as Henry Alvarado
- Mathias Rhodes as Alvin

== Production ==
Principal photography commenced in January 2019.

== Ratings ==
According to AGB Nielsen Philippines' Nationwide Urban Television Audience Measurement People in television homes, the pilot episode of TODA One I Love earned a 7% rating.
