= Let the Love Begin (TV series) =

2015 Philippine television drama series

- Title card
- Genre: Drama; Romantic comedy
- Based on: Let the Love Begin (2005)
- Developed by: Agnes Gagelonia-Uligan
- Written by: Maribel Ilag; Rhoda Sulit-Marino; Jessie Villabrille; Patrick Louie Ilagan
- Directed by: Gina Alajar
- Creative director: Roy Iglesias
- Starring: Ruru Madrid; Gabbi Garcia
- Theme music composer: Pearlsha Abubakar
- Opening theme: "Let the Love Begin" by Ruru Madrid and Gabbi Garcia / Julie Anne San Jose and Ralf King
- Composers: Gloria Sklerov and Lenny Macaluso
- Country of origin: Philippines
- Original language: Tagalog
- No. of episodes: 70 (list of episodes)

Production
- Executive producer: Leilani Feliciano-Sandoval
- Production locations: Quezon City, Philippines
- Camera setup: Multiple-camera setup
- Running time: 20–30 minutes
- Production company: GMA Entertainment TV

Original release
- Network: GMA Network
- Release: May 4 – August 7, 2015

Let the Love Begin is a 2015 Philippine television drama romance comedy series broadcast by GMA Network. The series is based on a 2005 Philippine film of the same title. Directed by Gina Alajar, it stars Ruru Madrid and Gabbi Garcia. It premiered on May 4, 2015 on the network's Telebabad line up. The series concluded on August 7, 2015, with a total of 70 episodes.

The series is streaming online on YouTube.

== Premise ==
Erick and Pia were childhood friends and got separated due to their parents' arguments. They will meet again as teenagers, with Erick eventually falling in love with Pia. When Pia's stepmother, Celeste, and Luchie torture Pia and her family, it leads to the both of them deciding to end their relationship.

== Cast and characters ==
Cast

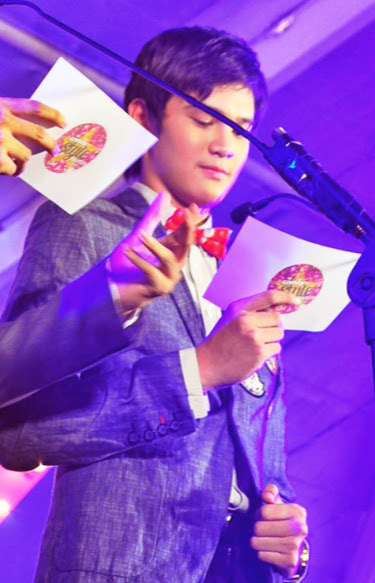
Ruru Madrid

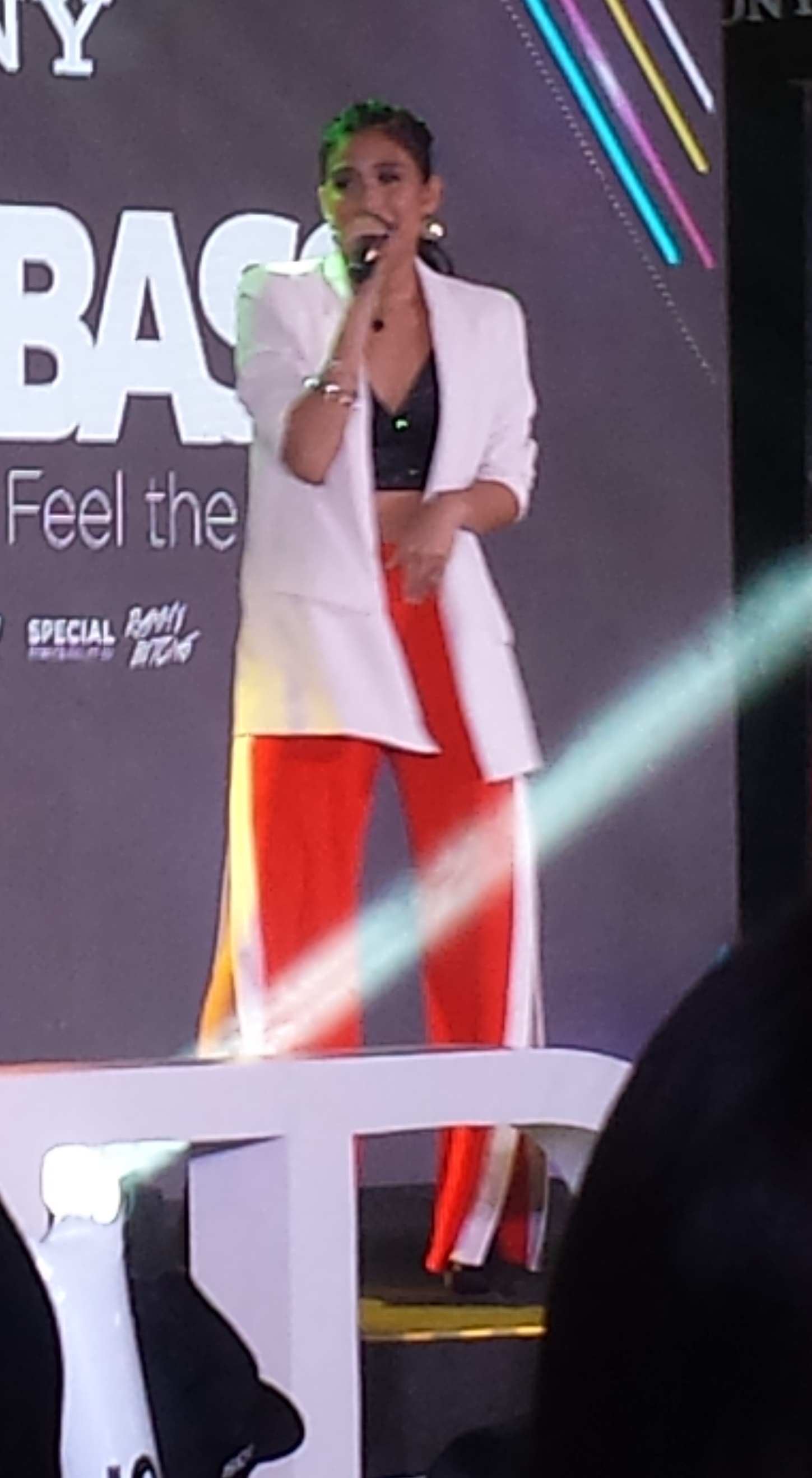
Gabbi Garcia

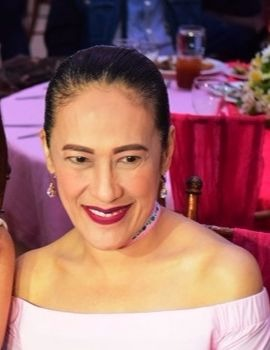
Ai-Ai delas Alas

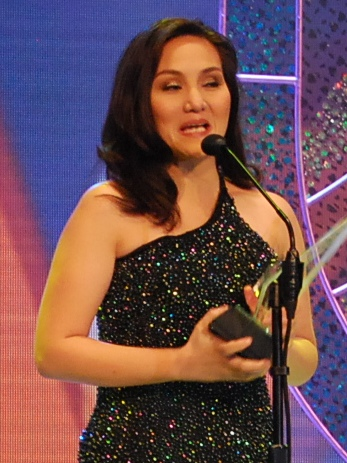
Gladys Reyes

Lead cast

- Ruru Madrid as Frederick "Erick" M. Pontenciano / DJ 1D
- Gabbi Garcia as Sophia Alexandra "Pia" V. Sta. Maria

Supporting cast

- Ai-Ai delas Alas as Jenina "Jeni" Magtanggol-Pontenciano / DJ Pabebeyoncé
- Ar Angel Aviles as Elsa Pontenciano
- Gina Pareño as Maria Anastacia "Tacing" Magtanggol
- Gardo Versoza as Antonio "Tony" Sta. Maria / DJ Tony
- Donita Rose as Celeste Estuar-Dela Vega
- Rita De Guzman as Luchie Estuar-Dela Vega
- Mark Anthony Fernandez as Jose Marie Quinto / DJ Jom
- Gladys Reyes as Katrina Fernandez / DJ Katy Fairy
- Neil Ryan Sese as DJ Jesse
- Noel Trinidad as Milton Villasanta
- Phytos Ramirez as Rafael "Uno" Fernandez / fake DJ 1D
- Therese Malvar as Lily
- Rhen Escaño as Connie
- Abel Estanislao as Makoy
- Sancho Vito Delas Alas as Caloy
- Nomer Limatog as Jules
- Rob Sy as Alex
- Lucho Ayala as Edison
- Kenneth Paul Cruz as Michael
- Ricardo Cepeda as Rodney
- Joko Diaz as Enrico
- Angeli Bayani as Eds

Guest cast

- Rich Asuncion as Melissa Magtanggol-Pontenciano
- Rita Avila as Sofia "Sofie" Villasanta-Sta. Maria
- Polo Ravales as Francisco "Kiko" Estuar-Dela Vega
- Joyce Burton as Victoria Estuar
- Andre Paras as Bradley Castillo

== Casting ==
Actor Andre Paras made an appearance as Bradley, who originated from the Philippine television drama series The Half Sisters.

== Production ==
Principal photography commenced in April 2015.

== Ratings ==
According to AGB Nielsen Philippines' Mega Manila household television ratings, the pilot episode of Let the Love Begin earned a 19.7% rating. The final episode scored a 22.1% rating, which is the series' highest rating.

== Accolades ==
Accolades received by Let the Love Begin
Year	Award	Category	Recipient	Result	Ref.
2015	29th PMPC Star Awards for Television	Best New Male TV Personality	Sancho Vito	Nominated	
