= Suzette Ranillo =

Filipino actress

- Born: Maria Suzette Sevilla Ranillo; January 11, 1961 (age 65); Cebu City, Cebu, Philippines
- Years active: 1970–present
- Parent(s): Mat Ranillo Jr. (father); Gloria Sevilla (mother)
- Relatives: Mat Ranillo III (brother); Krista Ranillo (niece); Matias Ranillo Sr. (grandfather); Dandin Ranillo (brother); Liza Ranillo (cousin); Amado Cortez (stepfather)
- Website: http://www.carehomethemovie.com

Maria Suzette Sevilla Ranillo (born January 11, 1961) is a Filipino actress who began her career at age 12 under the screen name Nadia Veloso. She is widely recognized for her work in film, television, and theater.

== Biography ==
Born in Cebu City, Philippines to actors Mat Ranillo, Jr. and Gloria Sevilla (who later wed Amado Cortez). Her siblings are Maria Lilibeth Sevilla Ranillo a.k.a. Bebet Ranillo DeRivera, Matias Archibald Sevilla Ranillo III, to his friends and family "Archie," (a.k.a. Mat Ranillo III), Matias Jonathan Sevilla Ranillo IV a.k.a. Jojo Ranillo, Matias Bonifacio Sevilla Ranillo V a.k.a. Dandin Ranillo, Matias Junius Ferdinand Sevilla Ranillo VI a.k.a. Juni Ging Ranillo and Czareanah Mari Sevilla Cortez a.k.a. Inah Cortez Do.

== Filmography ==
=== Film ===
- Gimingaw Ako (1973)
- Aliw / Pleasure (1979)
- Taga sa Panahon (1980)
- Kumander Alibasbas (1981)
- Trudis Liit (1993)
- Muling Umawit ang Puso (1995)
- Segurista (1995)
- Kristo (1996) Film Academy of the Philippines Best Picture Nominee.
- Ama Namin (1998)
- Panaghoy sa Suba (2004)
- I Will Always Love You (2006)
- CareHome (2006)
- In Progress (2008; SR Films). Directed by Suzette Ranillo.
- Kamera Obskura (2012)
- Blood Ransom (2014)
- Tiniente Gimo (2016)
- Siargao (2017)
- Pagbalik (2019)
- #Jowable (2019)
- Culion (2019)
- Video City: Be Kind, Please Rewind (2023)

=== Theater ===
- Kanser ("Noli Me Tangere"). Role: Sisa. Metropolitan Theatre, Philippines. 1990–1992; 2003–2004.
- Kristo. Role: Veronica / Weeping Women. Folk Arts Theatre, Philippines. 1994–1999.
- El Filibusterismo. Role: Juli. Metropolitan Theatre/Little CCP (Cultural Center of the Philippines). 1992–1994.
- Florante at Laura. Role: Laura. Metropolitan Theatre, Philippines. 1992.
- Bong Bong at Kris. Role: Ate Guy. Ateneo Graduate School, Philippines. 1991.

=== Television ===
- 1992 Lucia
- 1993 Sali-Salising Buhay
- 2003 Pangako Sa 'Yo as Fatima Dela Merced
- 2003 Basta't Kasama Kita as Luisa Rivera
- 2003 Sana'y Wala Nang Wakas as Jake
- 2015 Nathaniel as Lod
- 2015 FPJ's Ang Probinsyano as Dely
- 2018 Kadenang Ginto as Pilar
- 2023 Minsan pa Nating Hagkan ang Nakaraan as Salud
- 2025 I Love You Since 1892 as Madre Olivia

== Awards and nominations ==
=== Personal recognition ===
- 1975 FAMAS Best Supporting Actress Awardee. "Gimingaw Ako" (Kampilan Films)
- 1979 Urian Best Actress Nominee. "Aliw" /(Pleasure) (Seven Stars Production)
- 1980 FAMAS Best Supporting Actress Nominee. "Taga Sa Panahon" (Premiere Productions)
- 1995 Metro Manila Film Festival Best Supporting Actress Nominee. "Mulang Umawit ang Puso" (Viva Films)
- 1996 Metro Manila Film Festival Best Supporting Actress Nominee. "Trudis Liit" (Merdeka Films)

=== Recognition of projects ===
- 1981 FAMAS Best Picture Awardee. "Kumander Alibasbas"
- 1992 Cannes Film Festival Best Docu-Drama Awardee. Gawad CCP Best Drama for TV Awardee. "Lucia". (BBC). Directed by Mel Chonglo.
- 1995 Entry to Toronto Film Festival (Canada). "Segurista" (Neo Films).
- 1996 Film Academy of the Philippines Best Picture Nominee. "Kristo" (CineSuerte).
- 1997. Metro Manila Film Festival 2nd Best Picture, Best Story, Best Theme Song, and Best Supporting Actress. "Babae" ("Woman").
