= The Half Sisters =

Philippine television drama series

- Title card
- Genre: Drama
- Created by: Dode Cruz
- Developed by: Luningning Ribay
- Written by: Luningning Interino-Ribay; Gilda Olvidado-Marcelino; Christine Badillo-Novicio; Jonathan Cruz
- Directed by: Mark A. Reyes V; Gina Alajar
- Creative director: Jun Lana
- Starring: Barbie Forteza; Thea Tolentino
- Narrated by: Barbie Forteza; Thea Tolentino
- Theme music composer: Tata Betita
- Opening theme: "Ibibigay Ko ang Lahat" by Maricris Garcia
- Country of origin: Philippines
- Original language: Tagalog
- No. of episodes: 418 (list of episodes)

Production
- Executive producer: Winnie Hollis-Reyes
- Production locations: Metro Manila, Philippines
- Editors: Jennalyn Sablaya; Paolo Mendoza; Gervic Estella
- Camera setup: Multiple-camera setup
- Running time: 18–30 minutes
- Production company: GMA Entertainment TV

Original release
- Network: GMA Network
- Release: June 9, 2014 – January 15, 2016

The Half Sisters is a Philippine television drama series broadcast by GMA Network. Directed by Mark A. Reyes V and Gina Alajar, it stars Barbie Forteza and Thea Tolentino both in the title roles. It premiered on June 9, 2014, on the network's Afternoon Prime line up. The series concluded on January 15, 2016, with a total of 418 episodes.

The series is streaming online on YouTube.

== Cast and characters ==
Cast

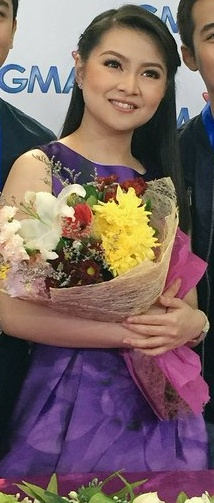
Barbie Forteza

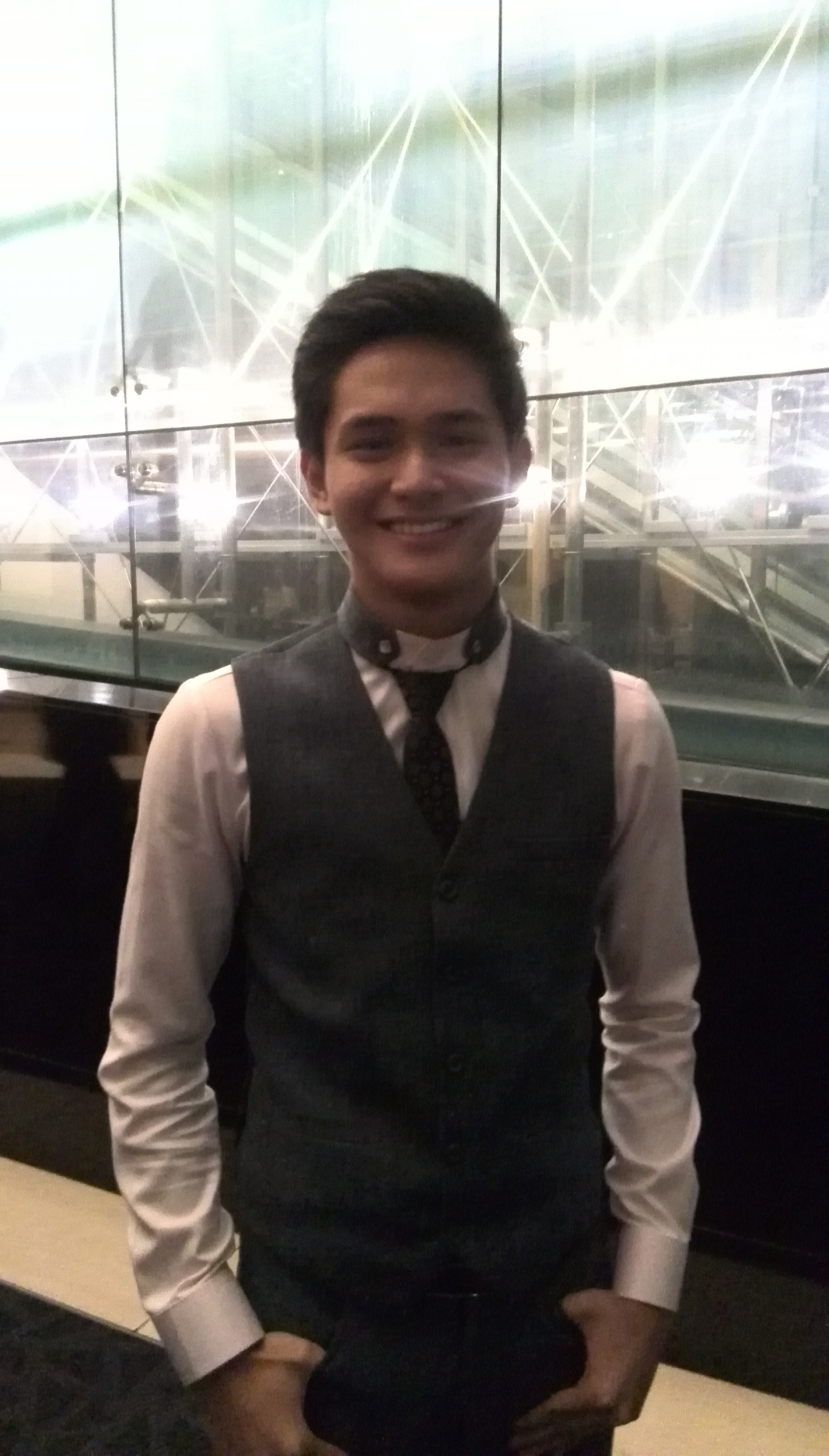
Ruru Madrid

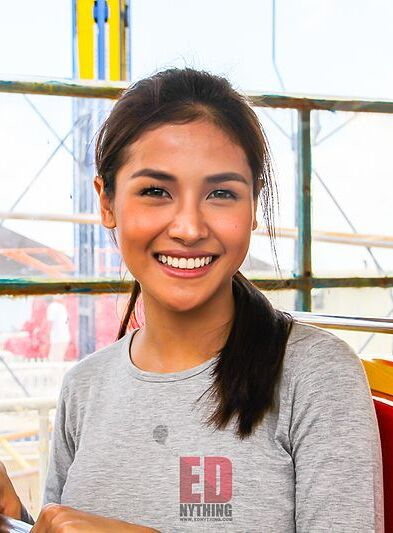
Sanya Lopez

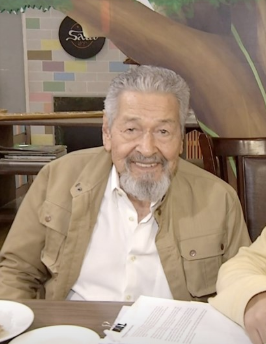
Eddie Garcia

Lead cast

- Barbie Forteza as Diana M. Valdicañas
- Thea Tolentino as Ashley "Ash" M. Alcantara

Supporting cast

- Jean Garcia as Karina "Rina" Mercado-Alcantara / Alexa Valdicañas
- Jomari Yllana as Benjamin "Benjie" Valdicañas
- Ryan Eigenmann as Alfred Alcantara
- Andre Paras as Bradley Castillo
- Derrick Monasterio as Sebastian "Baste" Castillo-Torres
- Mel Martinez as Venus Mercado

Guest cast

- Carmen Soriano as Lupita Valdicañas
- Pinky Marquez as Cleo Castillo
- JC Tiuseco as Carl Domingo
- Carlo Gonzales as Paulo Zulueta
- Cherie Gil as Magnolia McBride
- Ruru Madrid as Joaquin Castillo
- Vaness del Moral as Jackie Perez-Alcantara / Estrella Liwanag
- Pancho Magno as Juancho Rodriguez
- Jak Roberto as Ambo
- Sanya Lopez as Lorna
- Buboy Villar as Marlon
- Gloria Romero as Elizabeth McBride
- Eddie Garcia as Eduardo Guevarra-McBride
- Gwen Zamora as Abigail McBride
- Aljur Abrenica as Malcolm Angeles
- Edwin Reyes as Rafael Castillo
- Benjie Paras as Peter
- Gardo Versoza as Santi Abbarientos
- Elle Ramirez as Ericka Abbarientos
- Eula Valdez as Ysabel Zuñiga-Valdicañas
- Shyr Valdez as Cynthia
- Chanda Romero as Cielo
- Luz Valdez as Magda
- Juancho Triviño as Charles
- Winwyn Marquez as Vanessa Rodriguez
- Aifha Medina as Tanya
- Archie Adamos as Ruben

== Development ==
Mark A. Reyes V was hired as the director of the television series. In 2015, He was replaced by Gina Alajar.

== Production ==
The series was extended until January 15, 2016.

== Ratings ==
According to AGB Nielsen Philippines' Mega Manila household television ratings, the pilot episode of The Half Sisters earned an 11.5% rating. The final episode scored a 23.2% rating. The series had its highest rating on November 28, 2014, with a 25.6% rating.

== Accolades ==
Accolades received by The Half Sisters
Year	Award	Category	Recipient	Result	Ref.
2014	28th PMPC Star Awards for Television	Best Daytime Drama Series	The Half Sisters	Nominated	
2014	28th PMPC Star Awards for Television	Best New Male TV Personality	Andre Paras	Nominated	
2015	Golden Screen TV Awards	Outstanding Breakthrough Performance by an Actor	Andre Paras	Won	
2015	29th PMPC Star Awards for Television	Best Daytime Drama Series	The Half Sisters	Won	
2015	29th PMPC Star Awards for Television	Best Supporting Actress	Jean Garcia	Nominated	
2016	2016 Box Office Entertainment Awards	Most Popular Daytime Drama	The Half Sisters	Won	
2016	2016 Box Office Entertainment Awards	Most Promising Love Team on TV	Andre Paras, Barbie Forteza	Won	

== Legacy ==
Actor Andre Paras appeared in the 2015 Philippine television romantic comedy drama series Let the Love Begin in a guest role, portraying the same character he played in The Half Sisters.
