= Sherlock Jr. (TV series) =

2018 Philippine television drama series

- Title card
- Genre: Crime drama
- Created by: Aloy Adlawan
- Written by: R.J. Nuevas; Des Garbes-Severino; Jmee Katanyag; Jason John Lim
- Directed by: Rechie del Carmen
- Creative director: Roy Iglesias
- Starring: Ruru Madrid
- Theme music composer: Vehnee Saturno
- Ending theme: "Sa Yakap Mo" by Ruru Madrid and Gabbi Garcia
- Country of origin: Philippines
- Original language: Tagalog
- No. of episodes: 63 (list of episodes)

Production
- Executive producer: Darling Pulido-Torres
- Camera setup: Multiple-camera setup
- Running time: 25–35 minutes
- Production company: GMA Entertainment Content Group

Original release
- Network: GMA Network
- Release: January 29 – April 27, 2018

Sherlock Jr. is a 2018 Philippine television drama crime series broadcast by GMA Network. Directed by Rechie del Carmen, it stars Ruru Madrid in the title role. It premiered on January 29, 2018 on the network's Telebabad line up. The series concluded on April 27, 2018, with a total of 63 episodes.

The series is streaming online on YouTube.

== Premise ==
Jack and Irene are happily in love with each other. When Irene's motivation is to expose the truth, she finds herself in trouble along with her friend, Lily. Jack and Irene's dog, Serena investigates to find the truth about what happened to Irene and Lily.

== Cast and characters ==
Cast

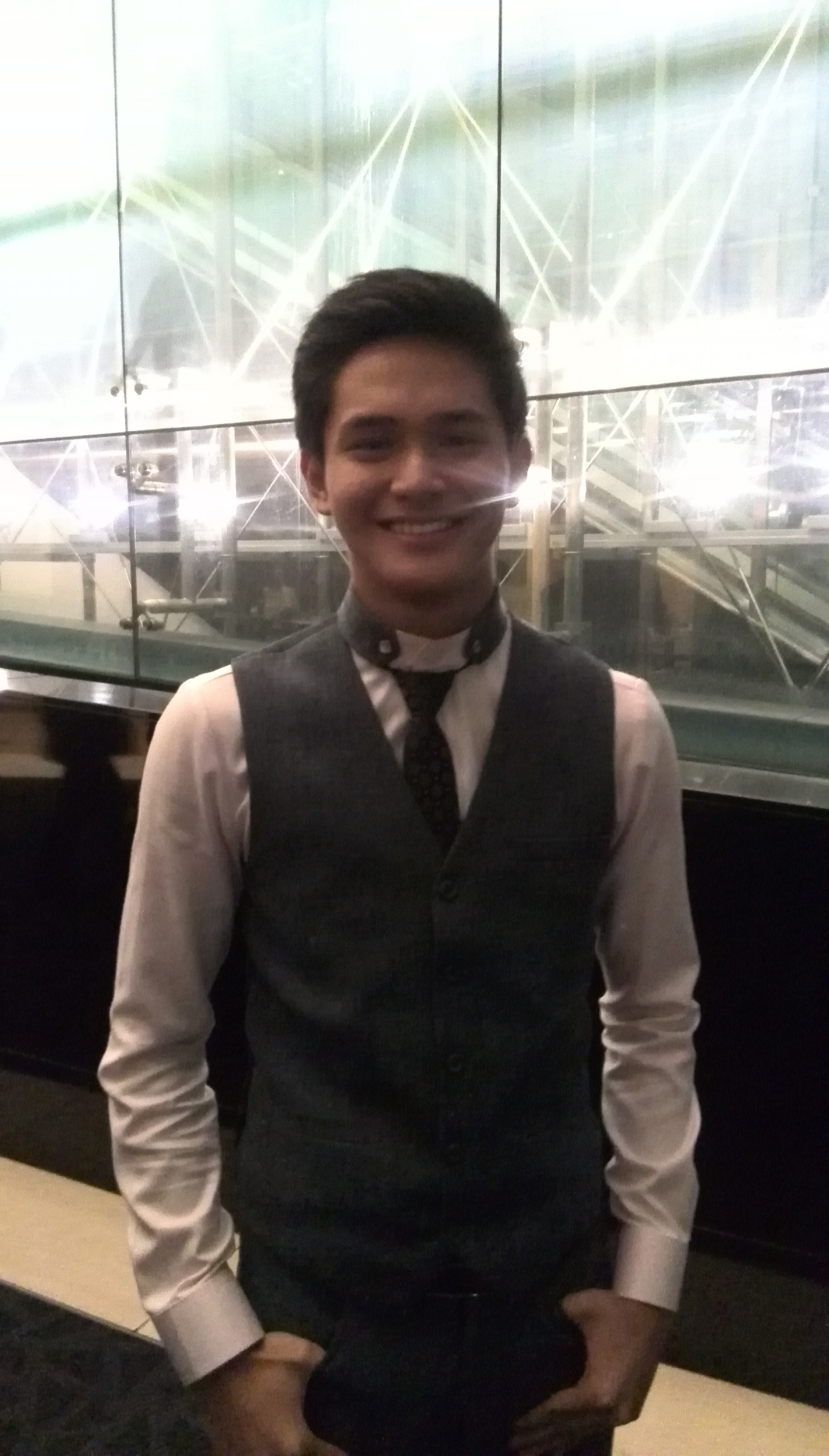
Ruru Madrid

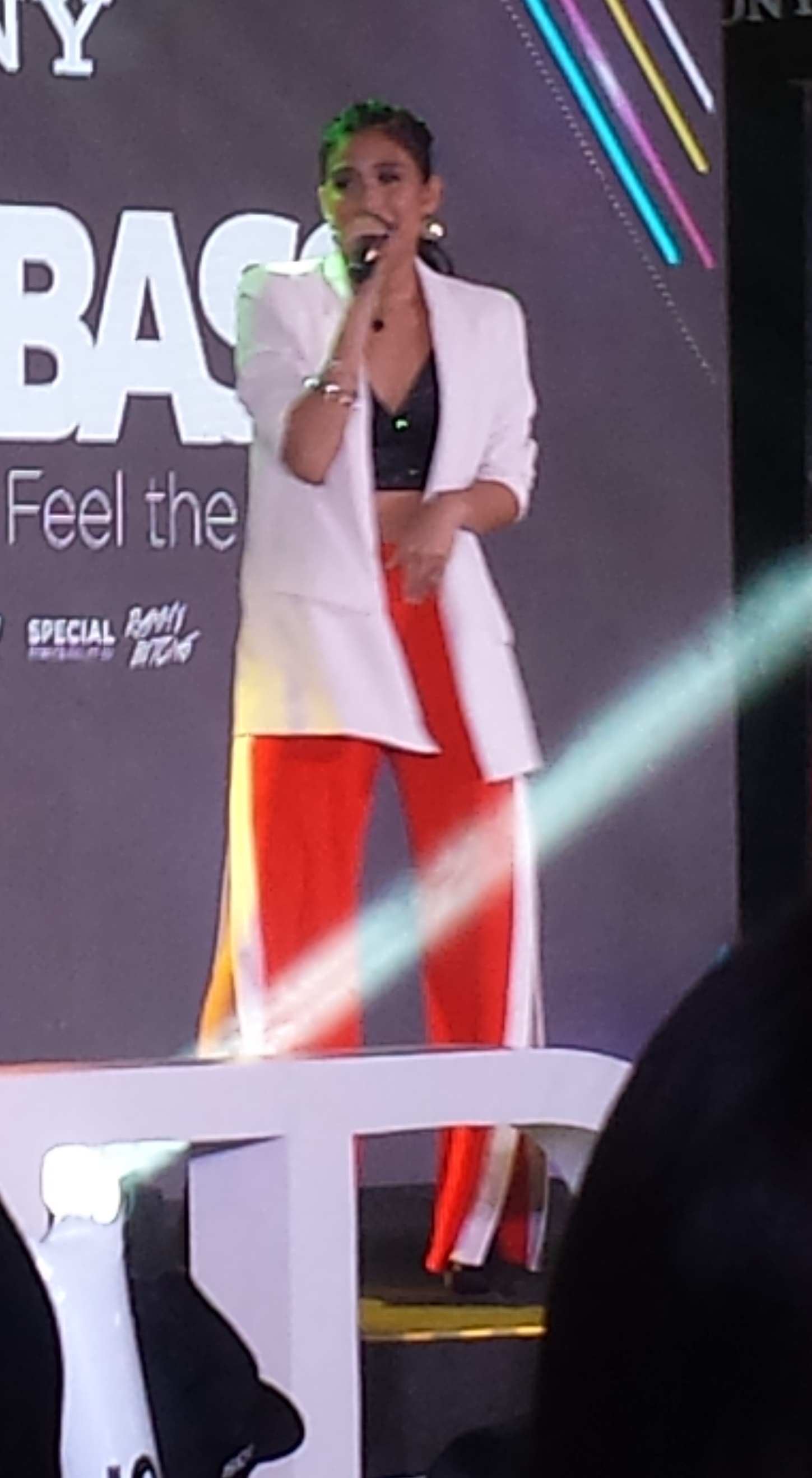
Gabbi Garcia

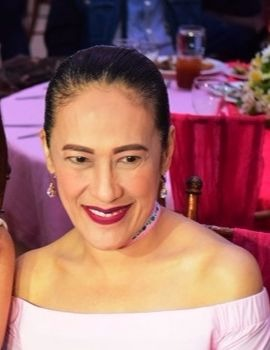
Ai-Ai delas Alas

Lead cast

- Ruru Madrid as Sherlock "Jack" Jackson Jr.

Supporting cast

- Gabbi Garcia as Lily Pelaez
- Serena as Siri
- Mikee Quintos as Siri's voice
- Ai-Ai delas Alas as Perla Calubaquib-Nuñez
- Tonton Gutierrez as Lawrence Carazo
- Andre Paras as Elpidio "Pido" Lumabao III
- Roi Vinzon as Conrado "Rado" Nuñez
- Sharmaine Arnaiz as Lorraine Pelaez
- Rochelle Barrameda as Carolina Almendraz-Carazo
- Matt Evans as Dindo Carazo
- William Martinez as Castro
- Kate Valdez as Jenny Nuñez
- Sofia Pablo as Caray Nuñez
- Alyana Asistio as Diosdada "Diosa" Mamaril

Guest cast

- Janine Gutierrez as Irene Manansala
- Carlo Gonzales as Bernardo Matias
- Camille Canlas as Desiree
- Hiro Peralta as Bart Lopez
- Prince Villanueva as Ron
- Analyn Barro as Liz
- Nicole Kim Donesa as Cassandra "Sandeng" Lopez / Cass
- Paolo Contis as Albert
- LJ Reyes as Meryl
- Aaron Yanga as Jerry
- Melanie Marquez as Louella De Villa
- Marc Abaya as Carl
- Mika dela Cruz as Michelle
- Lia Valentin as Sophie
- Kiel Rodriguez as Bert
- Bing Davao as Kap
- Mosang as Nene
- Jana Victoria as Eden
- Xyruz Cruz as Mike
- Rich Asuncion as Patricia
- Rafael Rosell as Gregor Jackson
- Sophie Albert as Erika
- Marco Alcaraz as Mark
- Rob Rownd as Sherlock Jackson Sr.
- Valeen Montenegro as Mylene / Audrey Velasco

== Ratings ==
According to AGB Nielsen Philippines' Nationwide Urban Television Audience Measurement People in television homes, the pilot episode of Sherlock Jr. earned an 11.4% rating. The final episode scored a 10.2% rating.

== Accolades ==
Accolades received by Sherlock Jr.
Year	Award	Category	Recipient	Result	Ref.
2018	32nd PMPC Star Awards for Television	Best Primetime Drama Series	Sherlock Jr.	Nominated	
2018	32nd PMPC Star Awards for Television	Best Child Performer	Sofia Pablo	Nominated	
