= Video City (film) =

2023 Philippine fantasy romantic comedy film

- Poster
- Directed by: Raynier Brizuela
- Written by: Che Espiritu; Raynier Brizuela
- Produced by: Jose Mari Abacan; Vincent del Rosario III; Valerie Salvador Del Rosario; Veronique Del Rosario-Corpus
- Starring: Ruru Madrid; Yassi Pressman
- Cinematography: Mel Cobrador
- Edited by: Noah Tonga
- Music by: Axel Fernandez
- Production companies: GMA Pictures; Viva Films, Inc.; Studio Viva
- Distributed by: GMA Pictures; Viva Films, Inc.; Studio Viva; Netflix
- Release date: September 20, 2023
- Running time: 104 minutes
- Country: Philippines
- Language: Tagalog

Video City: Be Kind, Please Rewind is a 2023 Philippine fantasy romantic comedy film written and directed by Raynier Brizuela. Produced by GMA Pictures, Viva Films and Studio Viva, it stars Ruru Madrid and Yassi Pressman.

The film was released on September 20, 2023 and is streaming online on Netflix.

The film features the budding romance between Han (Ruru Madrid), a student from 2023 who travels back in time to meet Ningning (Yassi Pressman), a Video City worker from 1995. Video City was a VHS rental chain owned by Viva Communications.

== Cast ==
- Ruru Madrid as John "Han" Randall
- Yassi Pressman as Kylie "Ningning" Eusebio
- Dennis Padilla as Jack
- Bodjie Pascua as Danty
- Suzette Ranillo as Anita
- Soliman Cruz as Han's father
- Chad Kinis as the boss
- TJ Valderrama as Jepp
- Ashley Diaz as Olive
- Yvette Sanchez as Mara

== Release ==
Video City was released theatrically on September 20, 2023 in the Philippines and digitally in Netflix on December 20, 2023.
