= Ruru Madrid =

Filipino actor (born 1997)

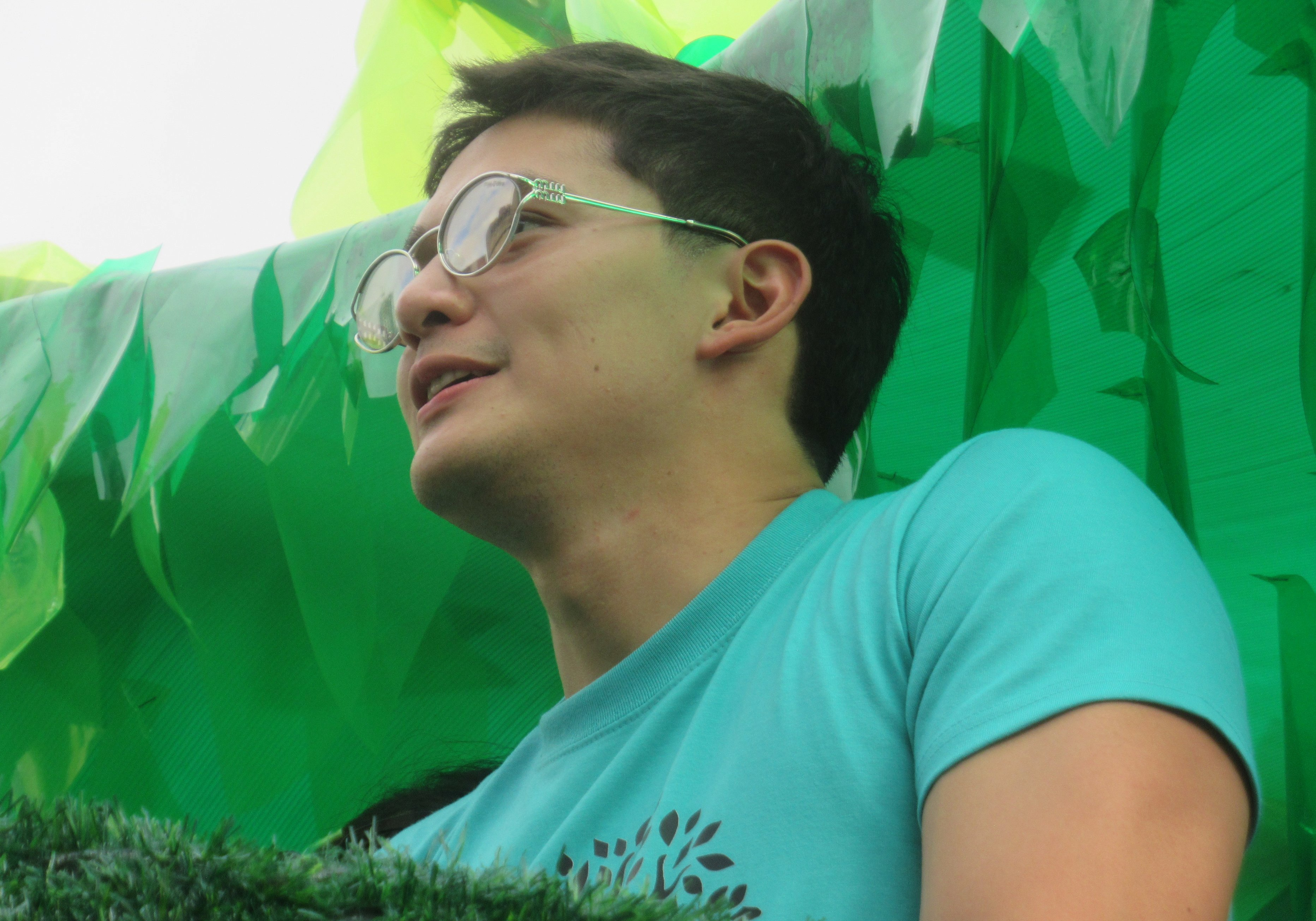
- Madrid in 2024
- Born: José Ezekiel Misa Madrid; December 4, 1997 (age 28); Zamboanga City, Philippines
- Occupations: Actor; singer; model; host; vlogger
- Years active: 2012–present
- Agent: Sparkle GMA Artist Center (2012–present)
- Known for: Encantadia (2016); Lolong; Running Man Philippines; Sherlock Jr. Black Rider
- Partner: Bianca Umali (2018–present)
- Relatives: Kai Sotto (brother-in-law)

José Ezekiel "Ruru" Misa Madrid (born December 4, 1997) is a Filipino actor, singer, model, and host who rose to fame after competing in the second season of the talent show Protégé (2012).

After signing with Sparkle GMA Artist Center, Madrid became known for portraying the role of Ybarro / Ybrahim in the 2016 version of Encantadia, the title role of Lolong in a 2022 series with the same title and Elias P. Guerrero in Black Rider (2023–2024). His accolades include Best Drama Actor at the PMPC Star Awards for Television for Encantadia in 2017, Best Single Performance by an Actor for an episode of Magpakailanman in 2018, Outstanding Breakthrough Performance by an Actor at the 5th Golden Screen TV Awards, a Cinemalaya Independent Film Festival Award, Best Actor in a Supporting Role for Green Bones at the 50th Metro Manila Film Festival, and a nomination for Best Actor at the Singapore International Film Festival in 2014.

== Personal life ==
Madrid was born on December 4, 1997, to Bong and Jackie Madrid. Madrid is a member of the Iglesia ni Cristo. He finished high school at National Christian Life College in Marikina.

He has two siblings: actress Rere Madrid, who is married to basketball player Kai Sotto since 2026, and Rara.

He was previously involved in a relationship with Gabbi Garcia.

In 2022, Madrid confirmed that he has been dating actress Bianca Umali for four years.

== Career ==
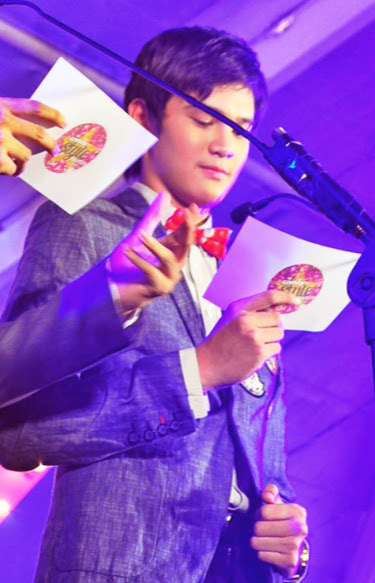
Madrid at the Candy Style Awards ceremony held in May 2013

At the age of 15, Madrid was nominated at the 2014 Singapore International Film Festival for Best Actor. His most recent awards were from PMPC Star Awards For Television: Best Drama Actor for Encantadia in 2017 and Best Single Performance By An Actor for an episode of Magpakailanman in 2018.

Madrid is the Anti-Piracy Ambassador of GMA Network beginning January 11, 2024.

== Other ventures ==
=== Business ===
Madrid ventured into a lease and rental office business in 2019.

He co-founded Transcend Studio, a production company that creates social content. Madrid also started a stunt team business called Aksyon dedicated to improve the action sequence in local production.

== Discography ==
Singles
Year	Title	Featured artist(s)	Label	Notes
2015	Let The Love Begin	Gabbi Garcia	GMA Records	Theme song of the series with the same title
2018	Sa Yakap Mo	Gabbi Garcia	GMA Records	Theme song of Sherlock Jr.
2019	Sana Sa Huli	N/A	GMA Music	TODA One I Love soundtrack
2019	Nawawala	N/A	GMA Music	
2020	Maghihintay	N/A	GMA Music	
2022	Running Man	Mikael Daez, Glaiza de Castro, Lexi Gonzales, Angel Guardian, Kokoy de Santos, and Buboy Villar	GMA Music	Running Man Philippines theme song

Albums
Year	Title	Track	Featured artist	Label
2016	One Heart	Love You the Way I Do	Gabbi Garcia	GMA Records
2022	Lolong (Original Soundtrack)	Isang Tinginan	N/A	GMA Playlist

== Filmography ==
=== Film ===
Year	Title	Role
2013	My Lady Boss	Elvin Lontoc
2013	Bamboo Flowers	Omel
2014	Above the Clouds	Andres
2014	Overtime	Enrique Amistoso
2015	Felix Manalo	Eusebio Sunga
2017	Meant to Beh	Diego
2019	Cara X Jagger	Jagger
2023	Video City: Be Kind, Please Rewind	John "Han" Randall
2024	G! LU	Albert
2024	Green Bones	Xavier Gonzaga
2026	Los Salvajes Bravos	Purganan

=== Television ===
==== Television series ====
Year	Title	Role
2012–2013	Paroa: Ang Kuwento ni Mariposa	Rasul
2013	Akin Pa Rin ang Bukas	Junior Morales
2013	Dormitoryo	Charlie Chavez
2014	My Destiny	Paul Andrada
2015	InstaDad	Zig
2015	Let the Love Begin	Frederick "Erick" Pontenciano
2015	Dangwa	Gerald
2015–2016	The Half Sisters	Joaquin Castillo
2016	Naku, Boss Ko!	Joven Jon Philip Ganid / Jon G.
2016–2017	Encantadia	Ybarro / Ybrahim
2017	Alyas Robin Hood	Andres Silang
2018	Sherlock Jr.	Sherlock "Jack" Jackson Jr.
2018	Inday Will Always Love You	Pabs
2018–2019	Barangay 143	Wax
2019	TODA One I Love	Raymond "Emong" Magsino
2019	The Gift	Eloy
2021	The Lost Recipe	Jordan Buenavidez
2022; 2025	Lolong	Rolando "Lolong" Candelaria
2023	The Write One	William "Liam" B. Herrera
2023–2024	Black Rider	Elias Policarpio-Guerrero / Black Rider
2024	Abot-Kamay na Pangarap	Elias Policarpio-Guerrero / Black Rider
2025	Encantadia Chronicles: Sang'gre	Ybarro / Ybrahim
2026	Hari ng Tondo	Gabriel Salvacion

==== Drama anthologies ====
Year	Title	Role
2013	Maynila: Faith in Love	Mark
2013	Maynila: Love By An Angel	Julius
2013	Magpakailanman: Ang Pakawalang Anghel	James
2013	Magpakailanman: Kislap ng Isang Parol	Jomar
2014	Magpakailanman: My Love Forever	Teen Jonathan
2014	Magpakailanman: Tatay na si Totoy, Nanay na si Nene	Moymoy
2014	Wagas: Jam and Mich Love Story	Jam Sebastian
2014	Seasons of Love: My Soulmate, My Soulhate	Rustico "Rusty" Bayani
2014	Magpakailanman: Cain at Abel: Ang Kalakal boys – The Cedric Macdon and Joven Santos Story	Cedric Macdon
2015	Magpakailanman: Kapatid Ko, Pasan Ko	Carlo
2015	Maynila: Lola Madonna	Joel
2015	Maynila: Sa Ngalan ng Ina	Leeno
2015	Maynila: My Rebel Heart	Derrick
2015	Wagas: Anjo & Aleine Robrigado Love Story	Anjo
2015	Wagas: Dez & Ana Love Story	Dez
2015	Karelasyon: Sumpa	Nando
2015	Dangwa	Carl
2016	Wagas: Summit Lovin'	Briggs
2016	Karelasyon: Poser	Marvin
2017	Wish Ko Lang: Room Boy	Justine
2018	Wagas: The Gladys Reyes and Christopher Roxas Love Story	Christopher Roxas
2018	Magpakailanman: Takbo ng Buhay Ko	Renson Embradura
2019	Magpakailanman: Adik Sa'yo	Radji Kem Galos
2020	I Can See You: High-Rise Lovers	Jared
2021	I Can See You: On My Way to You!	Jerrick Alfonso

==== Television shows ====
Year	Title	Role
2012	Protégé: The Battle for the Big Artista Break	Contestant / Runner-up
2012–2013	Party Pilipinas	Himself / Co-host / Performer
2013–2015	Sunday All Stars	Himself / Co-host / Performer
2015	Pepito Manaloto	Jose Magtigan
2015	Sabado Badoo	Himself / Cameo Footage
2016–2019	Sunday PinaSaya	Himself / Co-host / Performer
2018	Daddy's Gurl	Anton
2020–present	All-Out Sundays	Himself / Co-host / Performer
2021	Game of the Gens	Substitute host for Andre Paras
2022	Running Man Philippines	Cast member / Contestant
2022	Eat Bulaga!	Guest host
2023–present	It's Showtime	Guest cast / Performer
2025	Pinoy Big Brother: Celebrity Collab Edition 2.0	Houseguest

=== Theater ===
Year	Title	Role
2014	Ang Sugo: The Play	Young Felix Manalo

== Accolades ==
Awards and nominations
Year	Association	Category	Nominated work	Result
2012	Protégé: The Battle For The Big Artista Break	Runner-Up	—N/a	Won
2013	61st FAMAS Awards	German Moreno Youth Achievement Award	—N/a	Won
2013	27th PMPC Star Awards for Television	Best New Male TV Personality	Maynila: "Faith in Love" episode	Won
2014	30th PMPC Star Awards for Movies	New Movie Actor of the Year	Bamboo Flowers	Nominated
2014	30th PMPC Star Awards for Movies	Indie Movie Original Theme Song of the Year (as interpreter)	"Mamahalin Kita" (Bamboo Flowers)	Nominated
2014	5th Golden Screen TV Awards	Outstanding Breakthrough Performance by an Actor	Dormitoryo	Won
2014	11th Golden Screen Awards	Best Breakthrough Performance by an Actor	Bamboo Flowers	Nominated
2014	Singapore International Film Festival 2014	Best Actor (international)	Above The Clouds (GMA Pictures)	Nominated
2014	11th Golden Screen Awards	Best Original Song (as interpreter)	"Mamahalin Kita" (Bamboo Flowers)	Nominated
2017	31st PMPC Star Awards for Television	Best Male Actor (tied with Dingdong Dantes for Alyas Robin Hood)	Encantadia	Won
2018	32nd PMPC Star Awards for Television	Best Single Performance by An Actor (tied with James Blanco for Maalaala Mo Kaya: Hapag Kainan)	Magpakailanman: Takbo Ng Buhay Ko	Won
2021	ASEAN Excellence Achievers Awards 2021	Outstanding Male TV Personality	-	Won
2021	3rd Global Trends Excellence Awards 2021	Most Admired Actor and TV Host of Millenium	-	Won
2021	12th Star Awards for Music 2021	Male Pop Artist Artist of the YearMillenium	Maghihintay Ka (GMA Music)	Nominated
2022	Golden Globe Royal Achievement Awards 2022	Best TV Actor Of the Year	Lolong (GMA Public Affairs Original Series)	Won
2024	50th Metro Manila Film Festival	Best Actor in Supporting Role	Green Bones	Won
2025	53rd Box Office Entertainment Award	Best Supporting Actor	Green Bones	Won
2025	8th The EDDYS Award	Best Supporting Actor	Green Bones	Won
