= Spooky Nights =

Philippine television drama series

- Also known as: Spooky Nights Presents
- Genre: Comedy horror
- Country of origin: Philippines
- Original language: Tagalog
- No. of episodes: 45

Production
- Camera setup: Multiple-camera setup
- Running time: 24–40 minutes
- Production company: GMA Entertainment TV

Original release
- Network: GMA Network
- Release: March 26, 2011 – April 28, 2012

Related
- Spooky Valentine

Spooky Nights is a Philippine television comedy horror anthology series broadcast by GMA Network. It premiered on March 26, 2011. The series concluded on April 28, 2012.

The series is streaming online on YouTube.

== Episodes ==
=== "Bampirella" ===
Original air date	March 26, 2011 – April 16, 2011
Director	Albert Langitan
Cast and characters	Marian Rivera as Cinderella "Cindy" Dela Paz/Bampirella; Mikael Daez as Michael; Dingdong Dantes as Alfonso; Marc Abaya as Armand; Gelli de Belen as Mitch; Gladys Guevarra as Rosario; Ken De Leon as Angelina; Jervi "KaladKaren" Li as Megan Pak; Isabel Nesreen Frial as Eya

=== "The Ringtone" ===
Original air date	April 30, 2011 – May 21, 2011
The story begins when Brix, Nancy, Tricia, Vanessa and Macmac win a weekend treat in a resort from a radio text promo. Unknown to them, their supposedly fun summer adventure could turn ugly and even scary as they encounter the vengeful ghost of a woman named Sad-ako.
Director	Lore Reyes
Cast and characters	Kris Bernal as Nancy Reyes; Aljur Abrenica as Brix Cadayona; Sam Pinto as Tricia Rosales; Sef Cadayona as Vanessa Pok-Pok/Van Diesel; Rochelle Pangilinan as Sad-ako; Moymoy Palaboy as Clowns/Mang Juan (James) Manang Tess (Roadfill)/Kiko (James) Mico (Rodfill); Gerould Aceron as Macmac Cadayona; DJ Rico Robles as King; Gene Padilla as Aga; Pekto as Mad-ako

=== "Snow White Lady and the Seven Ghosts" ===
Original air date	June 4, 2011 – June 25, 2011
Director	Lore Reyes
Cast and characters	Rhian Ramos as Snow White Lady; Daniel Matsunaga as Prince; Enzo Pineda as Doc; Celia Rodriguez as Basya; Bella Flores as Lolita; John Feir as Sneezy; Jan Manual as Sleepy; Yogo Singh as Gasper; Diego as Grenta; Angeli Nicole Sanoy as younger Snow; Richard Quan as Dante; Lovely Rivero as Lilia; Gwen Zamora as Lisa; German Moreno as Dr Jordan "Jay"

=== "Nuno sa Feng Shui" ===
Original air date	July 2, 2011 – July 9, 2011
Director	Lore Reyes
Cast and characters	Claudine Barretto as Mila; TJ Trinidad as Stephen Lee; Tiya Pusit as Miss Lee

=== "Ang Manananggala: Battle of the Half-Sisters" ===
Original air date	July 16, 2011
Emily is a woman who manages a carnival that she inherited from her mother. Living with her half-sister Marvi, she keeps from everyone a dark secret about what she becomes when darkness falls: a "manananggal". Emily is a kind "manananggal", but Stella enters the scene and introduces herself as Emily and Marvi's other half-sister. Unknown to Emily, Stella has long been aware that she is a "manananggal" and that the latter is determined to keep the family business to herself, whatever the cost.
Director	Uro Q. Dela Cruz
Cast and characters	Claudine Barretto as Emily; Barbie Forteza as Marvi; Joshua Dionisio as Patpat; Katrina Halili as Stella; John Feir as Harry; Chanda Romero as Magdalena

=== "Bahay ni Lolo: A Very Spooky Night" ===
Original air date	July 30, 2011
Director	Uro Q. Dela Cruz
Cast and characters	Alyssa Alano as herself; Bea Binene as herself; Jake Vargas as himself; Louise delos Reyes as herself/Kasabwat; Alden Richards as himself/Alvin; Derick Monasterio as himself/Prankster 1; Lexi Fernandez as herself; Kristoffer Martin as himself/Prankster 2 (as Kris Martin); Diego as himself

=== "Da Mami" ===
Original air date	August 6, 2011
Director	Uro Q. Dela Cruz
Cast and characters	Dingdong Dantes as Franco; Solenn Heussaff as Beth; Yogo Singh

=== "The Mommy Returns" ===
Original air date	August 20, 2011
An actress in the 1970s, Mommy Glo has always decided on anything that concerns Bongbong—from the food he eats to the women he dates. She always justifies her meddling by saying that she only wants the best for her son. So far, none of the women that Bongbong dated seem good enough for her. When Mommy Glo dies, Bongbong finally gets the chance to be independent and choose the woman he will love. However, Mommy Glo loves her son so much that she cannot rest her soul. She decides to go back as a ghost and continues to interfere with her son's lovelife. After a while, Bongbong notices that something weird happens to the women he dates—Anna (Michelle Madrigal) gets scared stiff and ends up in a state of trauma; Karen (Andrea Torres) also winds up shocked in fear. At this point, Bongbong realizes that his mother frightens these poor women. He confronts Mommy Glo and tells her to leave him alone and just rest in peace.
Director	Uro Q. Dela Cruz
Cast and characters	Dingdong Dantes as Bongbong; Michelle Madrigal as Anna; Andrea Torres as Karen; Isabelle Daza as Mary Anne; Chanda Romero as Glo

=== "Ang Munting Mahadera" ===
Original air date	September 3, 2011 - September 10, 2011
It is about Rody's struggle to raise his children as a single father, maintain his macho image for his mother and keep his biggest secret—that he is a homosexual. Recently parted ways with his wife, Rody goes back to live with his mother, Felicia, and takes along with him his twin daughters: the mischievous Bembem and the well-behaved Jenjen. Rody's presumptuous and nosy mom believes that there is a dark secret behind his breakup with his wife. Thus, Felicia tries everything to trick him into confessing but Rody never admits until a magical creature comes out of his closet and makes him come clean. Meanwhile, Bembem finds herself a new playground in the old and big house of Felicia. She ignores her grandmother's instruction never to enter a certain room and accidentally frees an evil hag, who has long been staying there. The hag searches for someone to live with her in the world of shadows and soon aims for Jenjen to be the one.
Director	Uro Q. Dela Cruz
Cast and characters	Barbara Miguel as Jenjen / Bembem; Roderick Paulate as Rody; Luz Valdez as Felicia; Soxy Topacio as Domeng; Ervic Vijandre as Carlos; Odette Khan as Bruha

=== "Short Time of My Life" ===
Original air date	September 17, 2011
Cast and characters	Kris Bernal as Kristina a.k.a. Kristy, Zombie Girl, Krista; Rocco Nacino as Rico; Jean Garcia as Odette's mother; Rez Cortez as Kristy's father; Mel Martinez as Vilma; Pekto as Alma; Chariz Solomon as Odette; Diego Llorico as a zombie bride

=== "Sapi" ===
Original air date	October 1, 2011
The story recounts the struggle of a newly-wedded couple against a vengeful spirit of a woman who committed suicide. Belle and Paolo elope to a province after their recent wedding to escape Belle's disapproving father. Incidentally, the couple moves into Paolo's old house where Elsa, a woman who was in love with him, died. Believing that Paolo abandoned her, Elsa killed herself in his room and she is now determined to make him pay for it by possessing Belle and making her kill herself too.
Director	Uro Q. Dela Cruz
Cast and characters	Heart Evangelista as Belle; Geoff Eigenmann as Paolo; Ehra Madrigal as Elsa; Melissa Mendez as Nena; Tony Mabesa; Emilio Garcia

=== "Sumpa (The Chain Text Message)" ===
Original air date	October 8, 2011
Cast and characters	Kylie Padilla as Tina; Sarah Lahbati as Sarah; Ynna Asistio as Lindy; Enzo Pineda as Joey; Carl Guevarra as Mark; Jan Marini

=== "Singil" ===
Original air date	October 15, 2011
Director	Uro Q. Dela Cruz
Cast and characters	Mark Herras as JC; Jennica Garcia as Lea; Vaness del Moral as Melissa; Alden Richards as Alvin; Louise delos Reyes as Lulu; Lexi Fernandez as Alex; Vangie Labalan; Gloria Romero as Linda; Mike Tan as Linda's husband; Jackie Rice as younger Linda

=== "Sanggol" ===
Original air date	October 22, 2011
A story about a vengeful tiyanak terrorizing a community where a pregnant woman named Maria lives. Upon conceiving her child with Hector, Maria knows that her mother, Aling Cecil (Tanya Gomez), will disapprove of her circumstance: pregnant out of wedlock. True enough, Aling Cecil wants Maria to abort the child but the latter disagrees. As Maria decides to keep the baby, Aling Cecil locks her up and stops her from working and talking to anyone except her childhood friend, Nimfa. During Maria's pregnancy, she is constantly haunted by cries of a baby and by a bloody child who keeps on appearing to her. Later, the town experiences a series of scary events that leads them into concluding that a tiyanak creeps around them to take vengeance. It first attacked the abortion care provider, Madam Ora, and then victimized many others. After some time, it is revealed that Aling Cecil has something to do with the haunting tiyanak.
Director	Uro Q. dela Cruz
Cast and characters	Lovi Poe as Maria; TJ Trinidad as Hector; Andrea Torres as Nimfa; Tanya Gomez as Cecil; Victor Aliwalas as James; Lui Manansala as Madam Ora; Jackie Woo as Sintaro; Luz Fernandez as Soledad

=== "Siyam" ===
Original air date	October 29, 2011
Director	Uro Q. dela Cruz
Cast and characters	Dennis Trillo; Bianca King; Dexter Doria; Rez Cortez

=== "Kadugo" ===
Original air date	November 5, 2011
Director	Uro Q. dela Cruz
Cast and characters	Angelika dela Cruz as Ethel; Mike Tan as Ronnie; Jackie Rice as Jess; Irma Adlawan

=== "KaLAbit" ===
Original air date	November 12, 2011
Cast and characters	Katrina Halili as Iya; Richard Gutierrez as Miguel; Michelle Madrigal as Liza; Tiya Pusit

=== "Kalaro" ===
Original air date	November 19, 2011
Director	Uro Q. dela Cruz
Cast and characters	Claudine Barretto as Lara; Dennis Trillo as Chris; Mona Louise Rey as Ena; Miggs Cuaderno as Clark

=== "Kaibigan" ===
Original air date	November 26, 2011
Cast and characters	Jennylyn Mercado as Bless; Mark Herras as Efren

=== "Panata" ===
Original air date	December 3, 2011
Cast and characters	Lilia Cuntapay as Maria; Sam Pinto as Agnes; Mike Tan as JR; Jackie Rice as Cristy; Gwen Zamora as Jessa; Ryza Cenon as Alice; Bubbles Paraiso as Bebols

=== "Parol" ===
Original air date	December 10, 2011
As Christmas nears, Aya her daughter Frances and Elmer return to their hometown to pick up their Tatay Danny, who is now paralyzed. Tatay Danny had a heart attack when Carol abandoned him and her husband, Hector for some unknown reasons. When they get to their home, Elmer sees his childhood friend, Gengeng, and hears from her that unusual and mysterious things have been happening in their house since Carol had gone. Their family's abode further turns into a haunted house when Frances finds the lantern made by Aya and Carol a long time ago. When they hang it, they begin hearing cries for help. A disturbed soul also makes its presence felt in their house and this causes Aya, Elmer and Gengeng to investigate all these mysterious happenings.
Director	Uro Q. Dela Cruz
Cast and characters	Diana Zubiri as Aya; Lenlen Frial as Frances; Alden Richards as Elmer; Louise delos Reyes as Gengeng; Bianca King as Carol; Emilio Garcia as Hector; Pen Medina as Danny

=== "Perya" ===
Original air date	December 17, 2011
It tells the story of two lonely people who rediscover the meaning of Christmas when they meet an orphan named Alice. Jackie has been fooled by too many men that she has lost her faith in love. Now, she disguises herself as a boyish woman to discourage men from courting her. On the other hand, her friend Jilmer is a soft-hearted man who always ends up being brokenhearted because women take advantage of his kindness. Jackie meets Alice because of an incident in the carnival that she manages. Upon knowing that the girl is an orphan, Jackie decides to take her in despite Jilmer's warning that Alice might be a part of an illegal syndicate. Unknown to the two adults, Alice is worse than a syndicate. She has a very dark past and her desperate need for parental love becomes a psychotic obsession that makes her kill the people who disappoint her. Eventually, Jackie and Jilmer learns of Alice's true nature. In the end, as they drive away from the carnival, Alice spooks Jackie and Jilmer in Jilmer's car that they collide head on with a truck and the screen fades to black, leaving their fate unknown.
Director	Uro Q. Dela Cruz
Cast and characters	Claudine Barretto as Jackie; Raymart Santiago as Jilmer; Angeli Nicole Sanoy as Alice; Mel Kimura; Tom Olivar

=== "Orasyon" ===
Original air date	March 24, 2012
Director	Uro Q. Dela Cruz
Cast and characters	Louise delos Reyes as Donna; Alden Richards as Ringo; Sheena Halili as Carla; Ces Quesada as Biring; Edwin Reyes as Berto

=== "Aparisyon" ===
Original air date	March 31, 2012
Director	Uro Q. Dela Cruz
Cast	Geoff Eigenmann; Jackie Rice; Ryza Cenon; Gardo Versoza; Carlos Morales

=== "Kalansay" ===
Original air date	April 14, 2012
Director	Uro dela Cruz
Cast and characters	Joshua Dionisio as Anton; Barbie Forteza as Cheska; Renz Valerio as Sherwin; Joyce Ching; Jace Flores; Jan Marini; Tiya Pusit; Onyok Velasco

=== "Kasambahay" ===
Original air date	April 21, 2012
Director	Uro dela Cruz
Cast and characters	Bianca King as Laura; JC Tiuseco as Jeff/Edward; Sam Pinto as Shirley; Mona Louise Rey

=== "Korona" ===
Original air date	April 28, 2012
Cast and characters	Carmi Martin as Oria; Isabelle Daza as Mabel; Bubbles Paraiso; Andrea Torres; Diva Montelaba; Betong Sumaya; Rufa Mi; Diego Llorico

== Ratings ==
According to AGB Nielsen Philippines' Mega Manila household television ratings, the pilot episode of Spooky Nights earned a 20.7% rating. The final episode scored a 17.4% rating.

== Accolades ==
Accolades received by Spooky Nights
Year	Award	Category	Recipient	Result	Ref.
2011	25th PMPC Star Awards for Television	Best Horror or Fantasy Program	"Bampirella"	Won	
2012	26th PMPC Star Awards for Television	Best Horror/Fantasy Program	Spooky Nights	Nominated	
