= Kristoffer Martin =

Filipino actor (born 1994)

- Born: Kristoffer Martin Roach Dangculos; November 20, 1994 (age 31); Olongapo, Philippines
- Other names: Kristoff; KrisM; Tuntun
- Education: San Beda College
- Occupations: Actor, model, singer, dancer
- Years active: 2007–present
- Agent(s): ABS-CBN (2007–2009); GMA Network (2010–present)
- Spouse: AC Banzon (m. 2022)
- Children: 1

Kristoffer Martin Roach Dangculos (born November 20, 1994) is a Filipino actor. His career started when he joined the talent TV show Little Big Superstar where he was eliminated on the second week. He appeared in a couple of TV shows in ABS-CBN such as Prinsesa ng Banyera, Kung Fu Kids, Ligaw na Bulaklak and Pare Koy where he was known as Kristoffer Dangculos.

In 2010, Martin moved to GMA 7 drama shows such as Endless Love, Tween Hearts, Munting Heredera, Pahiram ng Sandali, Kakambal ni Eliana and Kahit Nasaan Ka Man. He also appeared regularly on the Sunday variety show Sunday All Stars.

== Career ==
Martin started his career on television when he joined a search for young singers. He also appeared as a TV guest in multiple ABS-CBN programs such as Boy & Kris, ASAP '08 and Wowowee. He has made several mall shows around Metro Manila and provinces when he joined Little Big Superstar together with his co-stars in Kung Fu Kids.

=== Kristoffer on ABS-CBN (2007–2009) ===
In ABS-CBN, KrisM's screen name is Kristoffer Dangculos. KrisM's career started when he joined Little Big Superstar, a search reality-variety show for kids with good singing ability. He became one of the ten finalist but he was eliminated in the second week of the finals. He appeared in Prinsesa ng Banyera, a noon-time drama after Wowowee. He played the role of the young Eric Fragante, who became TJ Trinidad when the character grew up. He was paired with Jane Oineza, also his co-star in Kung Fu Kids, who played the role of the young Maningning Burgos (who later became Kristine Hermosa).

KrisM became famous because of Kung Fu Kids, his first fantaserye drama series in ABS-CBN. In the said series, he plays the role of Benjamin "Benjo" Reyes, a bully always involved in rumbles, also known as Kid Bully. In Ligaw na Bulaklak, he played the role of Chuckie, the foster son of Mrs. Reyes (Arlene Muhlach) and the brother of Ian (Ron Morales). In Parekoy that was aired on January 5, 2009, Kristoffer played as Ringgo.

=== Kristoffer on GMA Network (2010–present) ===
After playing young Johnny (played by Dingdong Dantes) in the remake of the 2000 South Korean drama series, Endless Love, Kristoffer became a GMA Artist Center talent with the screen name, Kristoffer Martin. In Endless Love, he was paired with Kathryn Bernardo. Martin entered GMA Network with his former Kung Fu Kids co-star Joshua Dionisio. Kristoffer signed an exclusive three-year contract until 2013. He appeared in the teen-oriented show Tween Hearts and Munting Heredera where he was paired with Joyce Ching.

In the mid-2012, he was included as cast member of drama series on GMA Network entitled Luna Blanca and played the role of Joaquin "Aki" Alvarez. In 2013, he starred in two television dramas. The first drama being Kakambal ni Eliana where he is paired with Kim Rodriguez for the first time. Before the year ended he was cast in the drama Kahit Nasaan Ka Man where he is paired with Julie Anne San Jose. In 2014, he starred in Paraiso Ko'y Ikaw where he is again paired with Kim Rodriguez.

In 2015, KrisM appeared in one episode of Karelasyon where he plays a mama's boy. In 2016, KrisM was featured in the record album One Heart that was released by GMA Records.

== Personal life ==
Martin is fond of mountain climbing and he climbs mountains together with other actors like Alden Richards, Rodjun Cruz, Kylie Padilla and Dianne Medina.

Martin previously dated Joyce Ching from 2011 to 2013, that made them dubbed as "ex-goals" due to them pairing up before in several GMA shows.

In April 2021, Martin revealed that he began dating Actress and model, Liezel Lopez when asked about the rumored relationship with each other in The Boobay and Tekla Show to the public. They have broken up since.

In July 2021, he became a born-again Christian.

Martin married his non-showbiz girlfriend, AC Banzon in Capas, Tarlac in February 2022. The two had dated for seven years before breaking up in December 2020, they reportedly reconciled in July 2021; the couple had a child named Pré.

== Filmography ==
Television daily dramas
Year	Title	Role
2007	Prinsesa ng Banyera	Young Eric Fragante
2008	Kung Fu Kids	Benjamin "Benjo" Reyes
2008	Ligaw na Bulaklak	Chuckie
2009	Pare Koy	Ringgo Onasan/JR
2010	Endless Love	Young Johnny Dizon
2010–2012	Reel Love Presents: Tween Hearts	Christopher "Chris" Soriano
2011	Munting Heredera	Tim John "TJ" Navarro
2011–2012	Ikaw Lang ang Mamahalin	Jepoy Dimaculangan
2012	Luna Blanca	Joaquin Alvarez
2012–2013	Pahiram ng Sandali	Franz Dela Cruz
2013	Kakambal ni Eliana	Gabriel "Gabo" Santillan
2013	Kahit Nasaan Ka Man	Leandro De Chavez
2014	Paraiso Ko'y Ikaw	Christopher "Tupe" Enriquez
2015	Healing Hearts	Jay Mendoza
2015	Buena Familia	Zach Michaels
2016	Because of You	Jonathan "Onat" Larrazabal
2016–2017	Hahamakin ang Lahat	Luisito "Junior" Labsat Jr.
2017	Mulawin vs. Ravena	Libero
2017	Daig Kayo ng Lola Ko	Tipaklong
2017–2018	Super Ma'am	Ace Mendoza
2018	Victor Magtanggol	Lance Espiritu
2019	Dragon Lady	Young Brian
2021	Babawiin Ko ang Lahat	Joel Espejo-Salvador
2022	The Fake Life	Young Onats
2023	Mga Lihim ni Urduja	Ryker Gustillo
2024	Makiling	Sebastian "Seb" Salamanca- Terra
2024	Lilet Matias: Attorney-at-Law	Genesis Ocampo
2025–2026	Cruz vs Cruz	Jeffrey Cruz

Television drama anthologies
Year	Title	Role
2010	Maynila: The New Girl	Rex
2011	Spooky Nights: Bahay ni Lolo	Himself
2011	Maynila: Lazy Lily	Luis
2011	Maynila: Officially Yours	Eric
2012	Magpakailanman: The Nanay Silveria Story	Badong
2012	Maynila: Balik-Puso	Carlo
2012	Maynila: Time for Love	Troy
2012	Maynila: Heart of Mine	Matt
2013	Maynila: My Dream Guy	Brent
2013	Maynila: Love Vibes	Garreth
2013	Maynila: Playful Hearts	Daniel
2013	Maynila: Pusong Mapagpanggap	Brick
2013	Maynila: My Brother's Lover	Allen
2014	Magpakailanman: Siga noon, beki ngayon	Christopher Aguinaldo
2014	Magpakailanman: Pulis na Pogi	young Mariano "Neil" Perez Flormata, Jr.
2014	Maynila: M.U	
2014	Maynila: Always in love	
2015	Magpakailanman: Walang Hanggang Paalam	Pedro Arnado
2015	Maynila: My Absentee Mom	Maximo
2015	Maynila: Finding Faith	Alex
2015	Maynila: Girly Girl	Caloy
2016	Maynila: Ikaw Pa Rin	Rowell
2016	Magpakailanman: Lost Phone, Love Found	JP
2018	Maynila: Voice of My Heart	Kerwin
2019	Wagas: Wait Lang Is This Love?	Cedrick Dacanay
2022	Magpakailanman: The Blind Runner	Darryl
2022	Magpakailanman: Ang Pagtatapos ng Anak	Mark Sanchez
2023	Magpakailanman: Mag-asawa, Ginayuma?	Raul
2023	Magpakailanman: Pinaslang ng Tikbalang	Archie
2024	Magpakailanman: What Matters Most	Drei Cruzet
2024	Tadhana: Rom and Julie	Rom

Comedy shows
Year	Title	Role	Note
2011	Pepito Manaloto	Tommy Diones Jr.	
2013	Vampire ang Daddy Ko		
2013-14	Pepito Manaloto: Ang Tunay na Kuwento	Miggy Ramirez	
2021-22	Pepito Manaloto: Ang Unang Kuwento	Wendell Aquino	

=== Variety and reality shows ===
Variety and reality shows
Year	Title	Role	Notes
2007	Little Big Superstar	Himself	Contestant
2010–13	Party Pilipinas	Himself	Performer
2013–15	Sunday All Stars	Himself	Performer
2017	Road Trip	Himself	Guest
2021–present	All-Out Sundays	Himself	Performer
2024	It's Showtime	Himself	Guest / Performer

=== Film ===
Films
Year	Title	Role
2011	Tween Academy: Class of 2012	Diego
2012	Oros	Abet
2012	Sossy Problems	Ismael
2012	Boy Pick-Up: The Movie	Grocery Bagger
2014	Basement	Macoy
2025	KMJS' Gabi ng Lagim: The Movie	Rollie (Segment: “Pocong”)

== Discography ==
Year	Title	Featured artist	Notes
2012	The Lazy Song	Derrick Monasterio	Tween Academy: Class of 2012 soundtrack
2013	I'll Never Go	N/A	My Lady Boss soundtrack
2013	I'll Be There	Julie Anne San Jose	Kahit Nasaan Ka Man theme song
2016	Sa Piling Mo	N/A	Alyas Robin Hood theme song
2016	Nang Dahil Sa'yo	Hannah Precillas	Hahamakin ang Lahat theme song
2016	Paulit-Ulit	N/A	Fight for My Way local theme song
2018	Let Me Be The One	N/A	
2020	Lagi Na Lang	N/A	
2022	'Di Ba?	N/A	

== Awards and nominations ==
Year	Award giving body	Category	Nominated for	Result
2012	1st Party Pilipinas Most Liked Awards	Most Liked Loveteam with Joyce Ching	None	Won
2012	FAMAS Awards	German Moreno Youth Achievement Award	None	Won
2012	28th PMPC Star Awards for Movies	New Movie Actor of the Year	Tween Academy: Class of 2012	Nominated
2012	The Young Critics Circle Awards	Best Performance	Oros	Nominated
2013	10th Golden Screen Awards	Best Performance by an Actor in a Supporting Role	Oros	Won
2013	16th Long Island International Film Expo	Honorable Mention for Best Supporting Actor	Oros	Won
2013	1st Sunday All Stars Awards	Stand Out Season Performer	None	Nominated
2014	PMPC Star Awards for TV 2014	Best Drama Actor	Kahit Nasaan Ka Man	Nominated
2016	30th PMPC Star Awards for Television	Best Single Performance by an Actor	Magpakailanman: Mag-Ama sa Bilangguan	Won
