= Sunday All Stars =

Philippine television variety show

- Title card
- Genre: Variety show
- Directed by: Rommel Gacho
- Presented by: Regine Velasquez; Jaya; Janno Gibbs; Ogie Alcasid
- Country of origin: Philippines
- Original language: Tagalog
- No. of episodes: 107

Production
- Production locations: Studio 7, GMA Network Studios Annex, Quezon City, Philippines
- Camera setup: Multiple-camera setup
- Running time: 90–150 minutes
- Production company: GMA Entertainment TV

Original release
- Network: GMA Network
- Release: June 16, 2013 – August 2, 2015

Sunday All Stars is a Philippine television variety show broadcast by GMA Network. It premiered on June 16, 2013 on the network's Sunday Grande sa Hapon line up. The show concluded on August 2, 2015, with a total of 107 episodes.

== Overview ==
Sunday All Stars replaced Party Pilipinas, which was put off-air by the network management due to issues involving its production teams.

The show aired its pilot episode on June 16, 2013, with the cast members forming four celebrity teams: Tropang Trending, Ligang iLike, InstaGang and Tweet Hearts. Each team had celebrity leaders rotating each month. The judges will then access their performances determining who gave the best production per week. Criteria for judging includes conceptualization, execution and entertainment value. Home viewers are given a chance to choose who their best team is via online and SMS voting. Voting starts from 12PM of Monday up to the shows airing on Sundays at 1:45 PM. The remaining points will come from the show's segment "Kalerki-Oke" which is done live.

The show had one of the most talked about episode wherein a guy did his wedding proposal to his girlfriend live on stage towards the end of Tropang Trending's performance.

In April 2014, the management decide to reformat the program from the usual competition to a straight-up musical variety show as a homage to their timeslot predecessors, SOP and Party Pilipinas. It also reduced its broadcast time to at least 90 minutes.

== Cast ==
Lead hosts

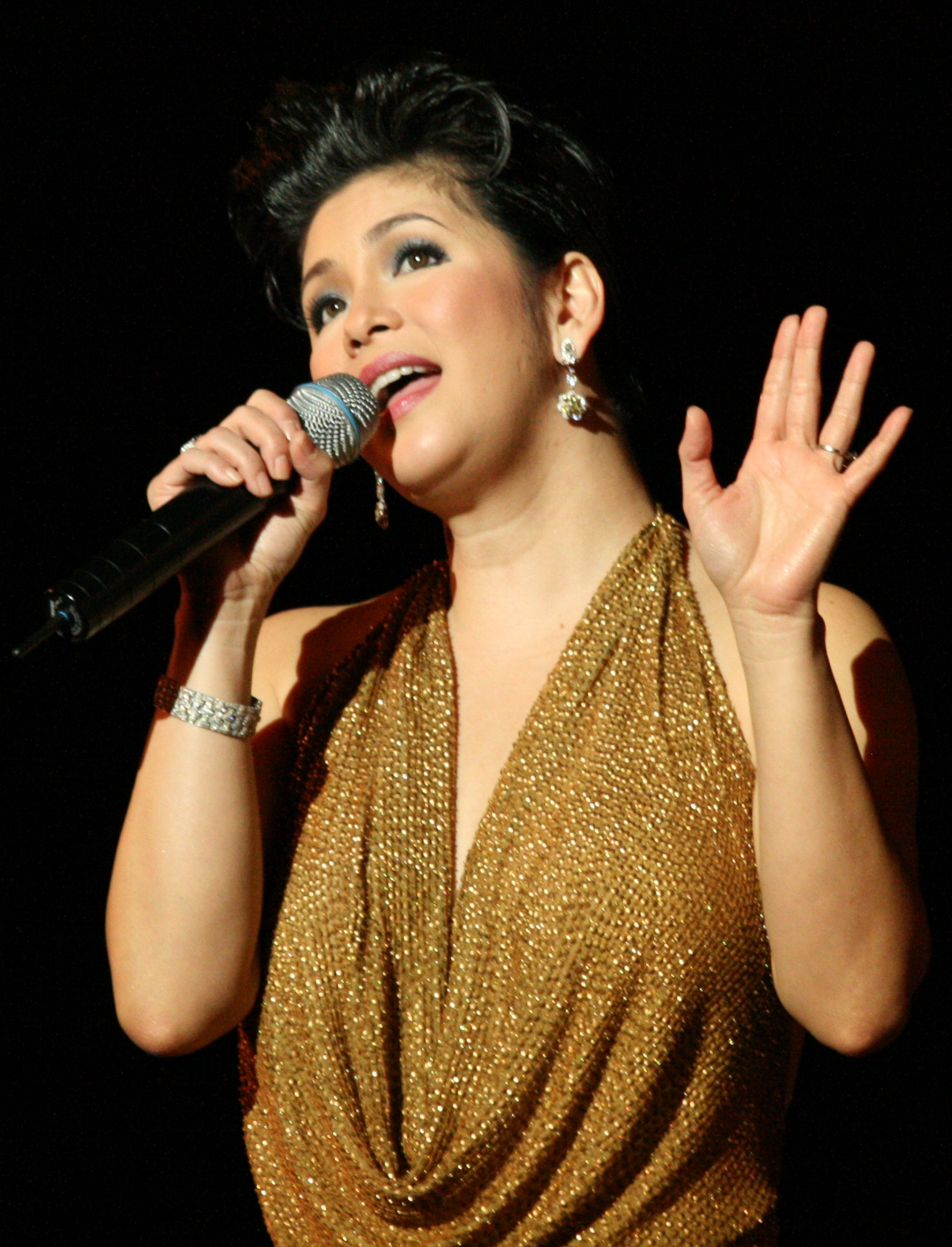
Regine Velasquez

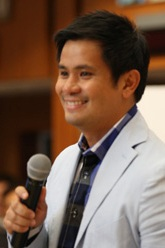
Ogie Alcasid

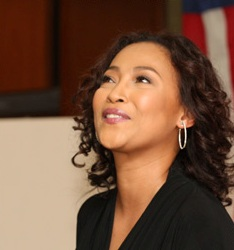
Jaya

- Janno Gibbs (2013–15)
- Regine Velasquez-Alcasid
- Ogie Alcasid (2013)
- Jaya

Co-hosts and performers

- Aicelle Santos
- Aira Bermudez
- Alden Richards
- Aljur Abrenica
- Alvin de Castro
- Andre Paras
- Andrea Torres
- Angelika dela Cruz
- Arkin Magalona
- Barbie Forteza
- Bea Binene
- Bela Padilla (2014–15)
- Benjamin Alves
- Bernard Cardona
- Bianca Umali
- Bubbles Paraiso
- Carla Abellana
- Christian Bautista
- Denise Barbacena
- Dennis Trillo
- Derick Monasterio
- Diva Montelaba
- Dingdong Dantes
- Ehra Madrigal
- Elmo Magalona
- Empress Schuck
- Enzo Pineda
- Eugene Herrera
- Frank Magalona
- Frencheska Farr
- Gabbi Garcia
- Gerphil Flores
- Gian Barbarona
- Gian Magdangal (2013–15)
- Glaiza de Castro
- Gwyneth Dorado
- Heart Evangelista
- Irish Fullerton
- Iya Villania
- Jak Roberto
- Jake Vargas
- James Wright
- Janine Gutierrez
- Jason Castro
- Jay Perillo
- Jay-R (2013–15)
- Jennylyn Mercado
- Jeric Gonzales
- Jillian Ward
- Jolina Magdangal (2013–14)
- Jona Viray
- Julian Trono
- Julie Anne San Jose
- Ken Chan
- Kris Bernal
- Kristoffer Martin
- Krystal Reyes
- Kyla (2013–15)
- Kylie Padilla
- Lauren Young
- Lexi Fernandez
- LJ Reyes
- Louise delos Reyes
- Lovi Poe
- Manilyn Reynes
- Marian Rivera
- Maricris Garcia
- Mark Bautista
- Mark Herras
- Max Collins
- Mayton Eugenio
- Megan Young
- Miguel Tanfelix
- Mike Tan
- Mikoy Morales
- Phytos Ramirez
- Rachelle Ann Go
- Rafael Rosell
- Rhian Ramos
- Rita Daniela
- Rocco Nacino
- Rochelle Pangilinan
- Rodjun Cruz
- Ruru Madrid
- Ryza Cenon
- Sam Pinto
- Sarah Lahbati
- Sef Cadayona
- Sherwin Baguion
- Solenn Heussaff
- Steven Silva (2013–14)
- Thea Tolentino
- Tom Rodriguez
- Trina Alcantara
- Wynwyn Marquez
- Yasmien Kurdi
- Yassi Pressman (2013–14)

Featuring

- Addlib
- Junior New System
- Philippine Island Assassin
- SexBomb Girls

=== Teams ===
==== Insta Gang ====
Team color: blue

Former team leaders

- Christian Bautista (Cycle 1)
- Glaiza de Castro (Cycle 1)
- WinWyn Marquez (Cycle 1)
- Mark Herras (Cycle 2)
- LJ Reyes (Cycle 2)
- Kris Lawrence (Cycle 3)
- Aljur Abrenica (Cycle 3)
- Rochelle Pangilinan (Cycle 3)
- Kyla (Cycle 3)
- Mark Bautista (Cycle 4)
- LJ Reyes (Cycle 4)
- Kyla (Cycle 5)

==== Ligang iLike ====
Team color: yellow

Former team leaders

- Jolina Magdangal (Cycle 1)
- Kris Bernal (Cycle 1)
- Louise delos Reyes (Cycle 1)
- Aljur Abrenica (Cycle 1)
- Kyla (Cycle 2)
- Aicelle Santos (Cycle 2)
- Mark Bautista (Cycle 3)
- Alden Richards (Cycle 3)
- Winwyn Marquez (Cycle 3)
- Andrea Torres (Cycle 3)
- Sef Cadayona (Cycle 4)
- Derrick Monasterio (Cycle 4)
- Kris Bernal (Cycle 5)

==== Tropang Trending ====
Team color: green

Former team leaders

- Mark Bautista (Cycle 1)
- Mark Herras (Cycle 1)
- Rochelle Pangilinan (Cycle 1)
- Rachelle Ann Go (Cycle 1)
- Jay R (Cycle 2)
- Max Collins (Cycle 2)
- Rocco Nacino (Cycle 3)
- Rodjun Cruz (Cycle 3)
- Max Collins (Cycle 3)
- Frencheska Farr (Cycle 3)
- Yassi Pressman (Cycle 4)
- Kris Lawrence (Cycle 4)
- Mark Bautista (Cycle 5)

==== Tweet Hearts ====
Team color: red

Former team leaders

- Jennylyn Mercado (Cycle 1)
- Julie Anne San Jose (Cycle 1)
- Sef Cadayona (Cycle 1)
- Alden Richards (Cycle 2)
- Rodjun Cruz (Cycle 2)
- Mark Herras (Cycle 3)
- Jay R (Cycle 3)
- Louise delos Reyes (Cycle 3)
- Kris Bernal (Cycle 3)
- Rochelle Pangilinan (Cycle 4)
- Christian Bautista (Cycle 4)
- Rocco Nacino (Cycle 5)

== Results ==
Teams:

- Insta Gang
- Ligang iLike
- Tropang Trending
- Tweet Hearts

=== Cycle 1 ===
Original air date	Theme	Winning team	Winning leader	Best performer(s)
June 16, 2013	"Astig"	Tweet Hearts	Jennylyn Mercado	Mark Herras
June 23, 2013	"I Do"	Ligang iLike	Kris Bernal^{1}	Aljur Abrenica
June 30, 2013	"Kalye"	Tropang Trending	Mark Bautista	Rochelle Pangilinan
July 7, 2013	"Heroes"	Tropang Trending	Mark Bautista	WinWyn Marquez
July 14, 2013	"Elements"	Tropang Trending	Mark Herras	Rachelle Ann Go
July 21, 2013	"Controversies"	Insta Gang	Glaiza de Castro	Rachelle Ann Go
July 28, 2013	"1940s, 1960s, 1970s, 1980s"	Ligang iLike	Louise delos Reyes	Aljur Abrenica
August 4, 2013	"International Music"	Tropang Trending	Rochelle Pangilinan	Kylie Padilla
August 4, 2013	"International Music"	Tropang Trending	Rochelle Pangilinan	Mark Bautista
August 11, 2013	"Original Pinoy Music"	Ligang iLike	Aljur Abrenica	Aljur Abrenica
August 11, 2013	"Original Pinoy Music"	Ligang iLike	Aljur Abrenica	Sef Cadayona
August 18, 2013	"Emotions"	Tropang Trending	Rachelle Ann Go	Kris Lawrence
August 18, 2013	"Emotions"	Tropang Trending	Rachelle Ann Go	Kristoffer Martin
August 25, 2013	"World Festivals"	Insta Gang	WinWyn Marquez	Kyla
August 25, 2013	"World Festivals"	Tropang Trending	Rachelle Ann Go	Jonalyn Viray
September 1, 2013	"Future"	Tropang Trending	Rachelle Ann Go	Sef Cadayona

Notes

1. Jolina Magdangal passed the role to Kris Bernal as the leader of Ligang iLike due to her doctor's health advice. Bernal will be the substitute leader of the team for two weeks and until Magdangal's recovery.

=== Cycle 2 ===
Original air date	Theme	Winning team	Winning leader	Best performer(s)
September 15, 2013	"Legends & Fairytales"	Insta Gang	Mark Herras	Yassi Pressman
September 22, 2013	"Dance"	Tweet Hearts	Alden Richards	Aira Bermudez
September 29, 2013	"Circus"	Tweet Hearts	Alden Richards	WinWyn Marquez
October 6, 2013	"Mystery Box"	Insta Gang	Mark Herras	Rochelle Pangilinan
October 6, 2013	"Mystery Box"	Insta Gang	Mark Herras	LJ Reyes
October 6, 2013	"Mystery Box"	Insta Gang	Mark Herras	Sef Cadayona
October 6, 2013	"Mystery Box"	Insta Gang	Mark Herras	Mark Bautista
October 13, 2013	"Seasons"	Tweet Hearts	Rodjun Cruz	Andrea Torres
October 20, 2013	"O.F.Ws"	Insta Gang	LJ Reyes	Frencheska Farr
October 27, 2013	"Halloween"	Tweet Hearts	Rodjun Cruz	Rodjun Cruz
November 3, 2013	"Champions"	Tropang Trending	Max Collins	Mark Bautista

== Ratings ==
According to AGB Nielsen Philippines' Mega Manila household television ratings, the pilot episode of Sunday All Stars earned a 13.3% rating. The final episode scored a 13.7% rating.

== Accolades ==
Accolades received by Sunday All Stars
Year	Award	Category	Recipient	Result	Ref.
2013	27th PMPC Star Awards for Television	Best Musical Variety Show	Sunday All Stars	Nominated	
2014	Golden Screen TV Awards	Outstanding Musical Program	Sunday All Stars	Nominated	
2014	28th PMPC Star Awards for Television	Best Musical Variety Show	Sunday All Stars	Nominated	
2015	29th PMPC Star Awards for Television	Best Musical Variety Show	Sunday All Stars	Nominated	
