= Party Pilipinas =

Philippine television variety show

- Title card in 2010
- Genre: Variety show
- Written by: Rommel Gacho; Real Florido; Yani Bautista; Haydee Bellen; Buboy Carreon; Stann Go; Irish Mangubat; Florence Rosini; Flow Ferrer
- Directed by: Mark A. Reyes V; Rico Gutierrez; Treb Monteras; Rommel Gacho; Louie Ignacio
- Presented by: Regine Velasquez; Ogie Alcasid; Jaya; Janno Gibbs
- Country of origin: Philippines
- Original language: Tagalog
- No. of episodes: 160

Production
- Executive producer: Lui Cadag
- Production locations: Studio 7, GMA Network Center, Quezon City, Philippines
- Camera setup: Multiple-camera setup
- Running time: 150 minutes
- Production company: GMA Entertainment TV

Original release
- Network: GMA Network
- Release: March 28, 2010 – May 19, 2013

Party Pilipinas (transl. party Philippines) is a Philippine television variety show broadcast by GMA Network. Hosted by Regine Velasquez, Ogie Alcasid, Jaya and Janno Gibbs, it premiered on March 28, 2010. The show concluded on May 19, 2013, with a total of 160 episodes.

== History ==
Party Pilipinas was conceptualized as an "all-party and all-positive vibes" show, according to the Corporate Communications Department of GMA Network and the show's new production manager, Ruth Mariñas.

The hosts of SOP, Regine Velasquez, Ogie Alcasid, Janno Gibbs, and Jaya joined the show, along with Kyla, Jay-R, and La Diva. In addition, Rachelle Ann Go and Mark Bautista also joined the show.

Louie Ignacio left the show on April 25, 2010. Headwriter Rommel Gacho became the show's temporary director from May 2–23 before management named Mark A. Reyes V and Rico Gutierrez as the show's permanent replacements for Ignacio.

On June 20, 2010, the program created a history in Philippine TV history as it became the first show to air in 3D.

The show also held engagements. Alcasid and Velasquez announced their wedding engagement during the August 8, 2010 episode. Velasquez also had her pre-nuptial message and pregnancy announcement in the show.

On March 27, 2011, the show celebrated its first anniversary, having a simultaneous live performances in four locations in the Philippines: Manila (GMA Studio 7), Baguio (Melvin Jones Grandstand), Davao City (Rizal Park) and Cebu City (Fuente Osmeña Circle) with directors Noel Cabacungan, Rommel Gacho, Ding Bolanos and Mark A. Reyes. The anniversary episode included the launch of GMA's summer plug for 2011, "Halo-Halo Ang Summer Saya".

From April 17 to May 15, 2011, GB Sampedro and Mark A. Reyes directed the show. Sampedro replaced Gutierrez due to the latter's resignation from the show. On July 24 of that same year, Treb Monteras replaced Sampedro.

The show featured international guests such as U-KISS, Jason Derulo (July 25, 2010), Dan Hill (February 6, 2011), Far East Movement (March 13, 2011), Chauncey Black of Blackstreet (January 29, 2012) and Jay Park (May 6, 2012).

In 2011, the show received its first award at Catholic Mass Media Awards as Best Entertainment Program.

On February 8, 2013, the Movie and Television Review and Classification Board meted a six-month probation period on the show for a dance number that was deemed "sexually charged" by the Board. GMA Network was ordered to make a public apology. On March 24, 2013, Christian Bautista performed on the show as part of his debut appearance on GMA Network.

Party Pilipinas was set in different destinations during April and May 2013 to celebrate the show's 3rd anniversary. The show was held at Ynares Center, Antipolo City; Philippine Navy Headquarters, Manila; Le Pavillon, Metropolitan Park, Roxas Boulevard; and Mall of Asia Arena, Pasay, as the show's 100,000-sq-m studio in the GMA compound in Quezon City was converted into a state-of-the art hub for the network's coverage of the 2013 midterm elections.

The show had its final episode on May 19, 2013, after the management decided to cancel the show and replace it with Sunday All Stars.

== Cast ==
Lead hosts

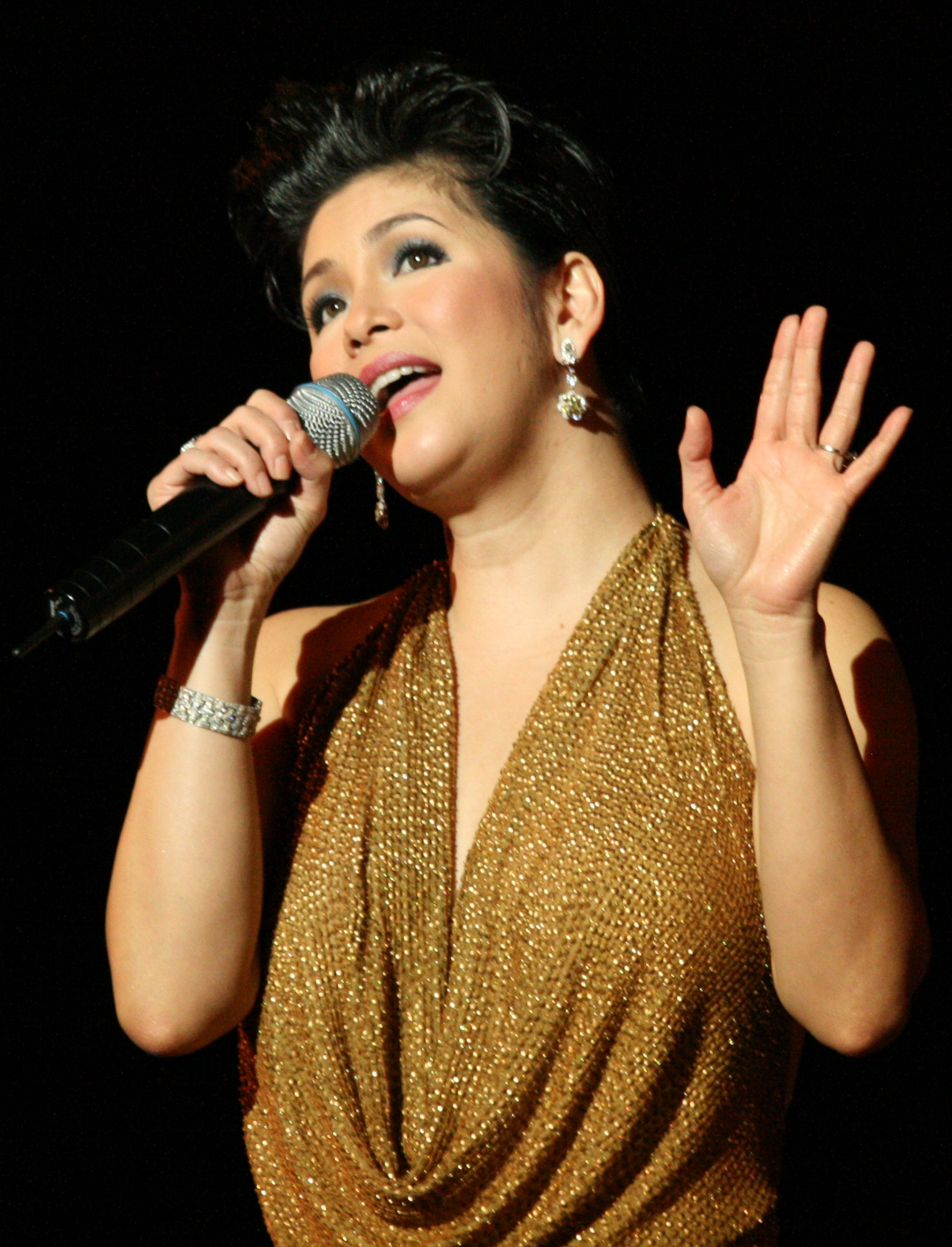
Regine Velasquez

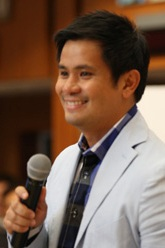
Ogie Alcasid

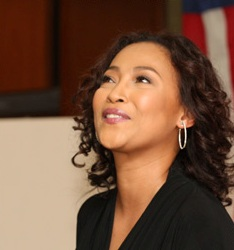
Jaya

- Regine Velasquez (2010–13)
- Ogie Alcasid (2010–13)
- Jaya (2010–13)
- Janno Gibbs (2010–13)

=== Co-hosts and performers ===
- Aicelle Santos (2010–13)
- Aira Bermudez
- Alden Richards (2011–13)
- Aljur Abrenica (2010–13)
- Alvin De Castro
- Andi Manzano (2010–11)
- Arkin Magalona
- Artstrong
- Barbie Forteza
- Bea Binene (2010–13)
- Bela Padilla (2010–12)
- Bernard Cardona
- Benjamin Alves
- Bianca King
- Bubbles Paraiso
- Carla Abellana (2010–13)
- Chloe McCulley
- Christian Bautista (2013)
- Dennis Trillo
- Derrick Monasterio
- Dingdong Dantes (2010–13)
- Diva Montelaba
- Down to Mars
- Ehra Madrigal
- Elmo Magalona (2010–13)
- Enzo Pineda
- Eugene Herrera
- Frencheska Farr (2010–13)
- Gabby Eigenmann (2010–13)
- Gaz Holgate
- Geoff Eigenmann
- Geoff Taylor (2010–11)
- Glaiza de Castro
- Gloc 9
- Gian Magdangal
- Gino Quillamor
- Gwen Zamora
- Gwendoline Ruais
- Hanna Flores
- Heart Evangelista (2010–13)
- Irish Fullerton
- Isabel Oli
- Isabelle Daza (2011–13)
- Iza Calzado (2010–12)
- Jak Roberto
- Jake Vargas
- Jason Castro
- Jay R
- Jay Perillo
- Jennylyn Mercado (2010–13)
- Jeric Gonzales
- Jillian Ward
- Jolina Magdangal (2010–13)
- Jonalyn Viray (2010–13)
- Joshua Dionisio(2010–12)
- Joyce Ching
- Julian Trono
- Julie Anne San Jose (2010–13)
- Katrina Halili (2010–12)
- KC Montero
- Ken Chan
- Kenneth Monico
- Kevin Cisco
- Kris Bernal (2010–13)
- Kris Lawrence
- Kristoffer Martin
- Kyla
- Kylie Padilla
- Lexi Fernandez
- Louise delos Reyes
- Lovi Poe (2010–13)
- Marc Abaya
- Marian Rivera
- Maricris Garcia
- Mark Bautista (2010–13)
- Mark Herras (2010–13)
- Marvin Agustin
- Mayton Eugenio
- Maxene Magalona (2010–13)
- Michelle Madrigal
- Michael Pangilinan
- Mike Tan
- Mikoy Morales
- Miguel Escueta
- Mona Louise Rey
- Panky Trinidad
- Rachelle Ann Go (2010–13)
- Rafael Rosell
- Raymond Gutierrez
- Rhian Ramos
- Richard Gutierrez
- Rico Barrera
- Rico Robles
- Rita Daniela
- Rocco Nacino
- Rochelle Pangilinan
- Ronnie Liang
- Ruru Madrid
- Ryza Cenon (2011–13)
- Sam Pinto
- Sarah Lahbati (2010–12)
- Sef Cadayona
- Sherwin Baguion
- Sexbomb Girls
- Solenn Heussaff
- Steven Silva
- Sunshine Dizon (2010)
- Thea Tolentino
- Tim Yap
- Trina Alcantara
- Venus Raj (2010–11)
- Will Devaughn
- Wynwyn Marquez
- XLR8 (2010–12)
- Yassi Pressman (2010–13)
- Ynna Asistio
- Yssa Alvarez

== Ratings ==
According to AGB Nielsen Philippines' Mega Manila household television ratings, the pilot episode of Party Pilipinas earned a 15.5% rating. The final episode scored a 10.9% rating.

== Accolades ==
Accolades received by Party Pilipinas
Year	Award	Category	Recipient	Result	Ref.
2010	24th PMPC Star Awards for Television	Best Musical Variety Show	Party Pilipinas	Nominated	
2010	24th PMPC Star Awards for Television	Best New Female TV Personality	Frencheska Farr	Nominated	
2010	24th PMPC Star Awards for Television	Best New Male TV Personality	Elmo Magalona Geoff Taylor	Nominated	
2011	25th PMPC Star Awards for Television	Best Musical Variety Show	Party Pilipinas	Nominated	
2011	25th PMPC Star Awards for Television	Best Female TV Host	Regine Velasquez	Nominated	
2011	Golden Screen TV Awards	Outstanding Musical Program	Party Pilipinas	Nominated	
2011	Golden Screen TV Awards	Outstanding Male Host in a Musical or Variety Program	Ogie Alcasid Raymond Gutierrez	Nominated	
2011	Catholic Mass Media Awards	Best Entertainment Program	Party Pilipinas	Won	
2012	Golden Screen TV Awards	Best Musical Variety Show	Party Pilipinas	Nominated	
2012	26th PMPC Star Awards for Television	Best Female TV Host	Regine Velasquez	Nominated	
2012	26th PMPC Star Awards for Television	Best Musical Variety Show	Party Pilipinas	Nominated	
2012	University of Mindanao Student Survey	Best Variety Show	Party Pilipinas	Won	
2013	Golden Screen TV Awards	Outstanding Musical Program	Party Pilipinas	Nominated	
2013	27th PMPC Star Awards for Television	Best Musical Variety Show	Party Pilipinas	Nominated	
2013	USTv Students' Choice Awards	Best Talk/Variety Show	Party Pilipinas	Won	
2014	Golden Screen TV Awards	Outstanding Musical Program	Party Pilipinas	Nominated	
