= Reel Love Presents Tween Hearts =

Philippine television drama series

- Title card
- Genre: Romantic drama
- Developed by: Kit Villanueva-Langit
- Written by: John Borgy Danao; John Jason Lim; Marlon Miguel; Cyril Ramos; Liberty Trinidad
- Directed by: Gina Alajar
- Starring: Barbie Forteza; Bea Binene; Joshua Dionisio; Jake Vargas; Joyce Ching; Kristoffer Martin; Louise delos Reyes; Derrick Monasterio; Lexi Fernandez
- Opening theme: "Everytime" by Frencheska Farr
- Country of origin: Philippines
- Original language: Tagalog
- No. of episodes: 87

Production
- Executive producer: Mona Coles-Mayuga
- Producer: Wilma Galvante
- Editors: Rolando Dela Merced, Jr.
- Camera setup: Multiple-camera setup
- Running time: 28–40 minutes
- Production company: GMA Entertainment TV

Original release
- Network: GMA Network
- Release: September 26, 2010 – June 10, 2012

Reel Love Presents Tween Hearts is a Philippine television drama romance series broadcast by GMA Network. Directed by Gina Alajar, it stars Barbie Forteza, Joshua Dionisio, Bea Binene and Jake Vargas. It premiered on September 26, 2010. The series concluded on June 10, 2012, with a total of 87 episodes.

The series is streaming online on YouTube.

== Cast and characters ==
Cast

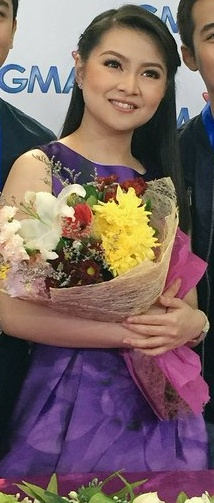
Barbie Forteza

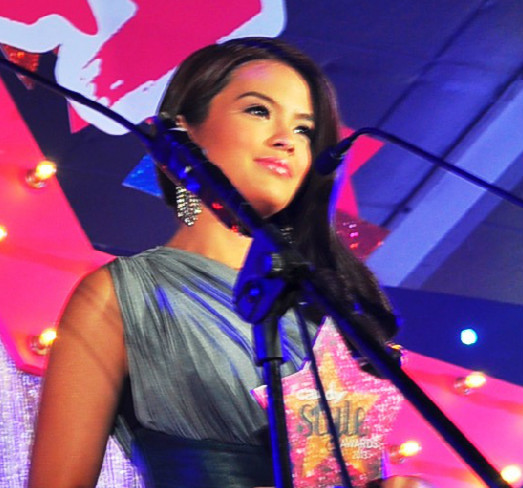
Bea Binene

Main cast

- Barbie Forteza as Barbara "Bambi" Fortez
- Bea Binene as Belinda "Belle" Fortez
- Joshua Dionisio as Joshua "Josh" Diones
- Jake Vargas as Jacob Vergara
- Kristoffer Martin as Christopher "Chris" Soriano
- Joyce Ching as Ligaya "Aya" Baltazar-Chan
- Derrick Monasterio as Ricardo "Rick" Montano
- Louise delos Reyes as Luisa dela Cruz
- Lexi Fernandez as Leslie "Les" Fernan
- Kylie Padilla as Heidilyn "Heidi" Rivera
- Marlo Mortel as Uno Morales

Recurring cast

- Hiro Peralta as Bayani "Ian" de Castro
- Yassi Pressman as Eunice Fuentabella
- Ken Chan as Mackenzie "Mac" Santos
- Kim Rodriguez as Angela "Angel" Villavicencio
- Teejay Marquez as Nathaniel Antonio "Nathan" Dimagalpok
- Rhen Escaño as Lucy Villavicencio
- Krystal Reyes as Mallory Santos
- Kiko Estrada as Kevin Del Mundo
- Julie Anne San Jose as Mira

Supporting cast

- Gabby Eigenmann as Coach A / Bulldog / Sir Boris
- Roxanne Barcelo as Rose Diones
- Emilio Garcia as Ted Fortez
- Sylvia Sanchez as Irene Fortez
- Richard Quan as Emerson Chan
- Pinky Amador as Liwayway Baltazar-Chan
- Tina Monasterio as Josephine "Josie" Montano
- Rochelle Barrameda as Maila Rivera
- Jao Mapa as Julio Vega
- Kit Thompson as Keith Villanueva
- Claudine Barretto as Clarisse Benitez
- Isabelle Daza as Annabelle
- Mariel Rey as Alexa
- Nathalie Hart as Vanessa
- Ynna Asistio as Yza
- Alden Richards as Dennis
- Steven Silva as Leo
- Bubbles Paraiso as Bunny
- Miguel Tanfelix as Miguel

== Ratings ==
According to AGB Nielsen Philippines' Mega Manila People/Individual television ratings, the pilot episode of Reel Love Presents Tween Hearts earned a 4.6% rating. The final episode scored a 13.3% rating in Mega Manila household television ratings.

== Accolades ==
Accolades received by Reel Love Presents Tween Hearts
| Year | Award | Category | Recipient | Result | Ref. |
|---|---|---|---|---|---|
| 2011 | Golden Screen TV Awards | Outstanding Breakthrough Performance by an Actor | Derrick Monasterio | Nominated | |
| 2011 | 25th PMPC Star Awards for Television | Best New Male TV Personality | Derrick Monasterio | Won | |
| 2011 | 25th PMPC Star Awards for Television | Best New Male TV Personality | Teejay Marquez | Won | |
| 2011 | 25th PMPC Star Awards for Television | Best New Male TV Personality | Hiro Peralta | Nominated | |
| 2011 | 25th PMPC Star Awards for Television | Best New Female TV Personality | Kim Komatsu | Nominated | |
| 2011 | 25th PMPC Star Awards for Television | Best Youth-Oriented Show | Reel Love Presents Tween Hearts | Won | |
| 2012 | 26th PMPC Star Awards for Television | Best New Male TV Personality | Kiko Estrada | Nominated | |
| 2012 | 26th PMPC Star Awards for Television | Best Youth Oriented Show | Reel Love Presents Tween Hearts | Nominated | |

== Film adaptation ==
Tween Academy: Class of 2012 was directed by Mark Reyes and produced by GMA Films. Based on the show, it was released in theaters on August 24, 2011.
