= Candies (TV program) =

Philippine television show

- Genre: Lifestyle
- Presented by: Alynna Asistio; Inah de Belen; Andi Manzano; Winwyn Marquez; Rhian Ramos
- Country of origin: Philippines
- Original language: Tagalog
- No. of episodes: 31

Production
- Camera setup: Multiple-camera setup
- Running time: 42 minutes

Original release
- Network: QTV
- Release: November 12, 2005 – June 17, 2006

Candies is a Philippine television lifestyle show broadcast by QTV. Hosted by Alynna Asistio, Inah de Belen, Andi Manzano, Wynwyn Marquez and Rhian Ramos, it premiered on November 12, 2005. The show concluded on June 17, 2006, with a total of 31 episodes.

== Overview ==
One of QTV's first shows aired, it was a teen magazine show aimed at an audience of teenage girls. Some of its hosts were daughters of celebrity couples such as Alynna Asistio (Nadia Montenegro and Macario "Boy" Asistio, Jr.), Inah de Belen (John Estrada and Janice de Belen), and Winwyn Marquez (Joey Marquez and Alma Moreno).
