= Who's Your Daddy Now? =

2007 Philippine television sitcom series

- Title card
- Genre: Sitcom
- Starring: Joey Marquez; Raymart Santiago; Ynna Asistio
- Country of origin: Philippines
- Original language: Tagalog

Production
- Camera setup: Multiple-camera setup
- Running time: 45 minutes
- Production company: GMA Entertainment TV

Original release
- Network: GMA Network
- Release: April 16 – July 13, 2007

Who's Your Daddy Now? is a 2007 Philippine television sitcom series broadcast by GMA Network. Starring Joey Marquez, Raymart Santiago and Ynna Asistio, it premiered on April 16, 2007 on the network's KiliTV line up. The series concluded on July 13, 2007.

The series is streaming online on YouTube.

== Cast and characters ==
Lead cast

- Joey Marquez as Peter
- Raymart Santiago as Mario
- Ynna Asistio as Andrea
- Paolo Contis as Paul

Supporting cast

- Celia Rodriguez as Candy
- Jean Garcia as Stephanie
- Julia Lopez as Diding

== Accolades ==
Accolades received by Who's Your Daddy Now?
Year	Award	Category	Recipient	Result	Ref.
2007	21st PMPC Star Awards for Television	Best Comedy Actress	Julia Lopez	Nominated	
2007	21st PMPC Star Awards for Television	Best Comedy Show	Who's Your Daddy Now?	Nominated	
