= Down to Mars =

Filipino boy band

- Origin: Manila, Philippines
- Genres: P-Pop, Electropop, R&B, Pop
- Years active: 2011–2014
- Label: Poly East
- Members: Kenji Chua; Jang Amparna; Sky Young; Kiro Rivera; Daisuke Hagihara; Jeongwon Song; Yheen Valero
- Website: www.downtomarsworld.com

Down to Mars was a Filipino interracial boy band of four Filipino, one Japanese, one Chinese and one Korean members. The group is regular in GMA 7's variety show Party Pilipinas. The group was chosen by the Philippines Department of Tourism to perform at Expo 2012 during the National Day Of Korea at Yeosu, South Korea on July 22, 2012.

== Discography ==
Album	Track listing
My Everything: Released: May 22, 2012; Label: Poly East Record; Languages: Filipino & English	1. "My Everything"; 2. "Oh Oh We Are"; 3. "Fool Paradise"; 4. "Fly"; 5. "Nandito Lang"; 6. "My Everything"
