= Tween Academy: Class of 2012 =

- Theatrical poster
- Directed by: Mark A. Reyes V
- Written by: Kit Villanueva-Langit
- Produced by: Jose Mari Abacan; Annette Gozon-Abrogar
- Starring: Barbie Forteza; Joshua Dionisio; Elmo Magalona; Jake Vargas; Bea Binene; Louise delos Reyes; Alden Richards; Joyce Ching; Kristofer Martin; Lexi Fernandez; Derrick Monasterio; Yassi Pressman
- Cinematography: Jay Linao
- Edited by: Marya Ignacio
- Music by: Allan Feliciano
- Production company: SM Development Corporation
- Distributed by: GMA Pictures
- Release date: August 24, 2011
- Running time: 113 minutes
- Country: Philippines
- Language: Filipino
- Box office: ₱38,289,770

Tween Academy: Class of 2012 is a 2011 Filipino teen comedy film directed by Mark A. Reyes V. It was produced by GMA Pictures and SM Development Corporation. The film was based on the series Tween Hearts, and stars Joshua Dionisio, Barbie Forteza, Jake Vargas, Bea Binene, Joyce Ching, Kristofer Martin, Lexi Fernandez, Derrick Monasterio and Louise delos Reyes, all in different roles, with Alden Richards and Elmo Magalona joining the cast. The film was released August 24, 2011.

== Plot ==
Kara (Barbie Forteza), George (Bea Binene), and Enzo (Elmo Magalona) are 3 best friends who have been constantly bullied at school and nicknamed the Imba Trio. On the night of the school dance Enzo gets carried out of the dance by Maximo (Derick Monasterio) and his crew because he accidentally bumped into Chloe (Lexi Fernandez) while dancing and ripped her dress. And while Kara and George try to help him they also get dumped in the trash along with Enzo and are helped by Christian (Alden Richards) and Diego (Kristofer Martin). After the prom the 3 decide to make a list to do that helps them become popular so they won't get bullied and pranked on anymore by the date of the prom, and they make the list a dare.

The next day at school Enzo learns that he has to retake a class again. And after trying to go to the bathroom he is stopped by the janitor who is still cleaning the bathroom. So Enzo decides to use the women's restroom hoping no one will notice. But he bumps into a hot chick Maddie (Sam Pinto), and develops a crush on her. Meanwhile, George finds out her best friend, Jepoy (Jake Vargas) is back in town. And Kara is at a comic convention where she tries to help Robin (Joshua Dionisio) when his backpack gets snatched, and unknowingly sells him the #1 issue of Metal Man online. Later that night, Enzo helps Maddie get her car out of a tight parking space and locks himself out of his car. Kara later becomes friends with Robin online without knowing his true identity. George later hangs out with Jepoy who sings his new song for her and starts to think he has a crush on her and she starts to develop a crush on him.

== Cast and characters ==
Cast and characters list adapted from IMDb.

=== Main cast ===
- Barbie Forteza as Kara (Anime Geek) - A cosplayer and online retailer of collectible toys. Naturally resourceful, she uses her techie skills to help her mom make ends meet for their family. She will develop an online friendship with Robin (Joshua Dionisio), one of her regular customers. She is cousin of Jess, that they don't tell others because of Jess is with the popular kids.
- Elmo Magalona as Enzo (The Nerd) - A shy guy and a wannabe rapper who ventures from television to movies as he assumes the role of “Mr. Fix-It”, Enzo. Perceived as an introvert, he would rather spend time with his gadgets or his two best friends, Kara and George.
- Bea Binene as George (Campus Tomboy) - She plays the boyish character that caught up in the “best friend syndrome”, she tries to hide her feelings for her best friend enemy and instead, helps him get closer to Chloe.
- Jake Vargas as Jepoy (Guitar Enthusiast) - The group's resident rocker. He is head-over-heels in love with Chloe (Lexi Fernandez) and tries to get closer to her through his best friend George. In the end, he just might realize that he is chasing after the wrong girl.
- Joshua Dionisio as Robin (Online game Fanatic) - He spends most of his time at their family-owned computer shop, while doing other students’ computer projects to earn extra income. His liking for comic books and collectible toys will lead him closer to Kara (Barbie Forteza).
- Kristoffer Martin as Diego (Happy-go-Lucky) - Plays the happy-go-lucky character, he carries a devil-may-care attitude, carelessly engaging in one fight after another. He is inseparable from his scooter and has a girlfriend named, Ashlee (Joyce Ching).
- Joyce Ching as Ashlee (Fashionista Gal) - She has a strict parents and have a hard time for her to take his boyfriend, Diego (Kristofer Martin) because she's afraid that her parent will be more strict about them. But later before they went to prom he introduce her boyfriend to her dad, just like Diego wants to. She is a good influence to her boyfriend, Diego.
- Louise delos Reyes as Jess (High School Sweetheart) - She belongs to a poor family but hides this from her circle of friends. She pretends to be rich like her barkada as she desperately wants to be in the “in-crowd” with Chloe. She is cousin of Kara, that they don't tell others because she is with the popular kids.
- Alden Richards as Christian (High School Heartthrob) - He is Chloe's brother. Despite his good looks and popularity in school, Christian is down-to-earth and friendly. He is close friends with Robin and will fall in love with Jess.
- Derrick Monasterio as Maximo (Campus Bully) - The resident school bully. He puts on a strong front but is actually a coward inside. He likes to pick on George and Enzo. She has a crush on Chloe and admit it at the prom.
- Lexi Fernandez as Chloe (Popular Gal) - a typical spoiled rich girl and she is Christian's sister. But underneath her “popular schoolgirl” façade, Chloe faces issues concerning her weight. She attracts many guys at school, including Jepoy.
- Yassi Pressman as Caitlin (The Cheerleader) - She is a cheerleader and friends with Jess, Ashlee, and Chloe.

=== Extended cast ===
- Sam Pinto as Maddie
- Angelu De Leon as Luisa
- Bobby Andrews as Robin's father
- Yayo Aguila as George's mother
- Nadia Montenegro as Sherrie
- Pinky Amador as Anna
- German Moreno† as Mang Fabian
- Pamela Jacinto as Manang Fe the Landlady
- Anna Vicente as Ridgeview Student
- Tessa Prieto-Valdes as Chloe's Mom

=== Cameos ===
- Sarah Lahbati
- Ellen Adarna
- Dingdong Dantes (from Twin Hearts)
- Marian Rivera
- Mark Herras
- Jojo Alejar
- Ynna Asistio
- Julie Anne San Jose as herself
- Alodia Gosiengfiao
- Chienna Filomeno
- Cesar Zarsata
- Chieffy Caligdong
- Ian Araneta
- Alexander Borromeo
- Ateneo Blue Eaglets Juniors Basketball Team
- La Salle Antipolo Girls Soccer Team

== Soundtrack ==
Soundtrack adapted from IMDb.

1. Nothing's Gonna Stop Us Now - Julie Anne San Jose and Elmo Magalona
2. Everytime - Frencheska Farr
3. Wake Me Up Before You Go-Go - Marlo Mortel
4. Kaba - Julie Anne San Jose
5. The Lazy Song - Derrick Monasterio and Kristofer Martin
6. Back to December - Lexi Fernandez
7. Nothing's Gonna Stop Us Now - Joshua Dionisio, Barbie Forteza, Jake Vargas and Bea Binene
8. Kaba - Alden Richards and Louise delos Reyes
9. The Lazy Song - Jake Vargas, Joshua Dionisio, Derrick Monasterio, Kristofer Martin and Alden Richards
10. Back to December - Barbie Forteza, Bea Binene, Louise delos Reyes, Lexi Fernandez, Joyce Ching and Yassi Pressman
11. Nothing's Gonna Stop Us Now - All Star Cast
12. Pers Lab - Barbie Forteza
13. Kaba - Jake Vargas and Bea Binene
14. Nothing's Gonna Stop Us Now (Minus One)
15. Kaba - Kristofer Martin and Joyce Ching

== Media release ==
The film was released onto DVD and VCD-formats on January 15, 2012, under GMA Records Home Video. However, it recently made their television premiere on April 22 at the same year on its film producer of TV arm GMA Network.

== Reception ==
According to Box Office Mojo, the movie was released in 75 theatres across the Philippines, and was ranked at number six during its weekend release. The movie had a final gross of ₱38.34 million to date.
