= Ilumina (TV series) =

2010 Philippine television drama series

- Title card
- Genre: Fantasy drama
- Created by: Dode Cruz
- Directed by: Mark A. Reyes V; Topel Lee
- Creative director: Jun Lana
- Starring: Rhian Ramos; Aljur Abrenica; Jackie Rice
- Theme music composer: Armi Millare
- Country of origin: Philippines
- Original language: Tagalog
- No. of episodes: 80

Production
- Executive producer: Winnie Hollis-Reyes
- Editors: Ver Custodio; Robert Ryan Reyes; Benedict Lavastida
- Camera setup: Multiple-camera setup
- Running time: 18–41 minutes
- Production company: GMA Entertainment TV

Original release
- Network: GMA Network
- Release: August 2 – November 19, 2010

Ilumina (transl. lights) is a 2010 Philippine television drama fantasy series broadcast by GMA Network. Directed by Mark A. Reyes V and Topel Lee, it stars Rhian Ramos, Aljur Abrenica and Jackie Rice. It premiered on August 2, 2010, on the network's Telebabad line up. The series concluded on November 19, 2010, with a total of 80 episodes.

The series is streaming online on YouTube.

== Cast and characters ==
Cast

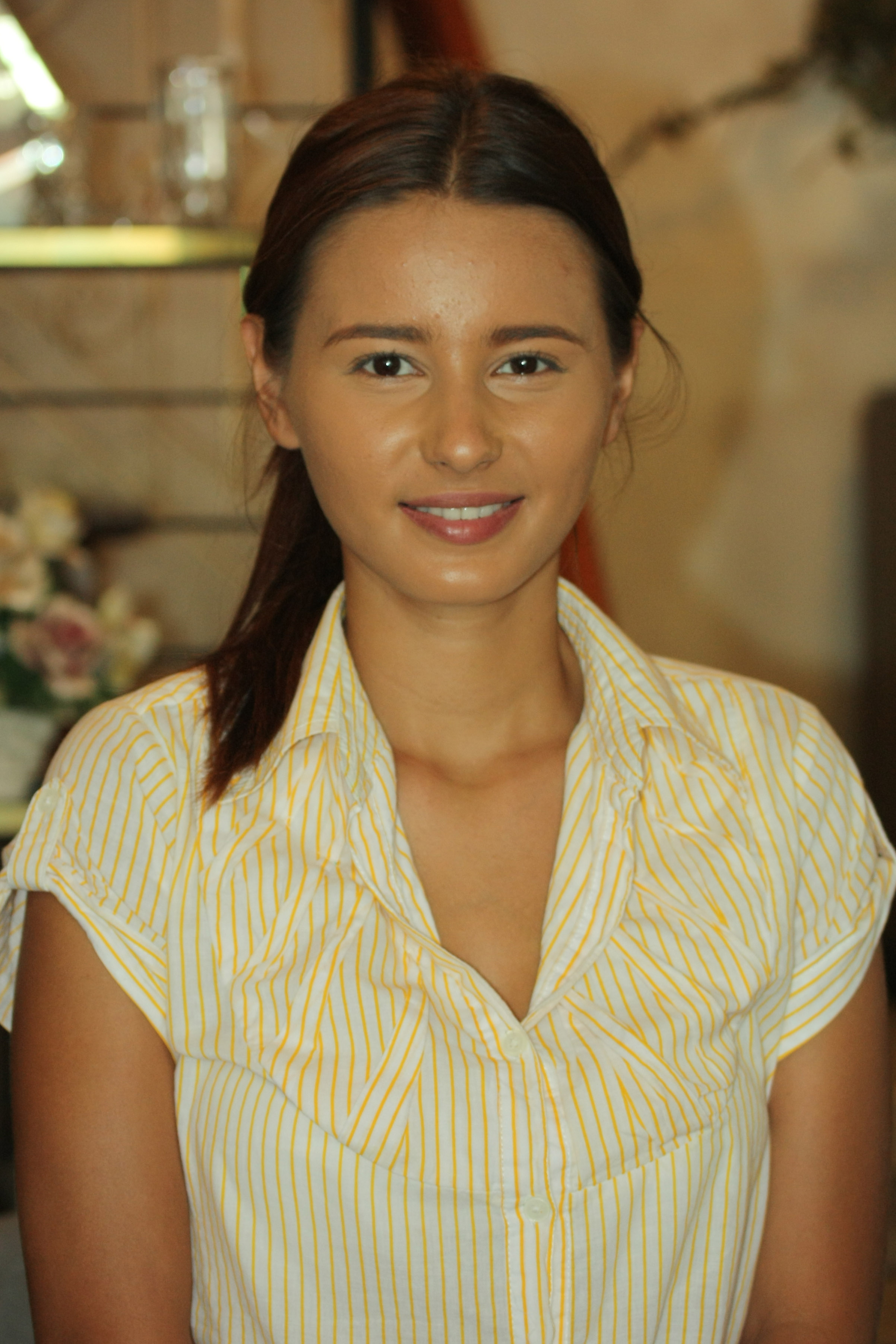
Jackie Rice

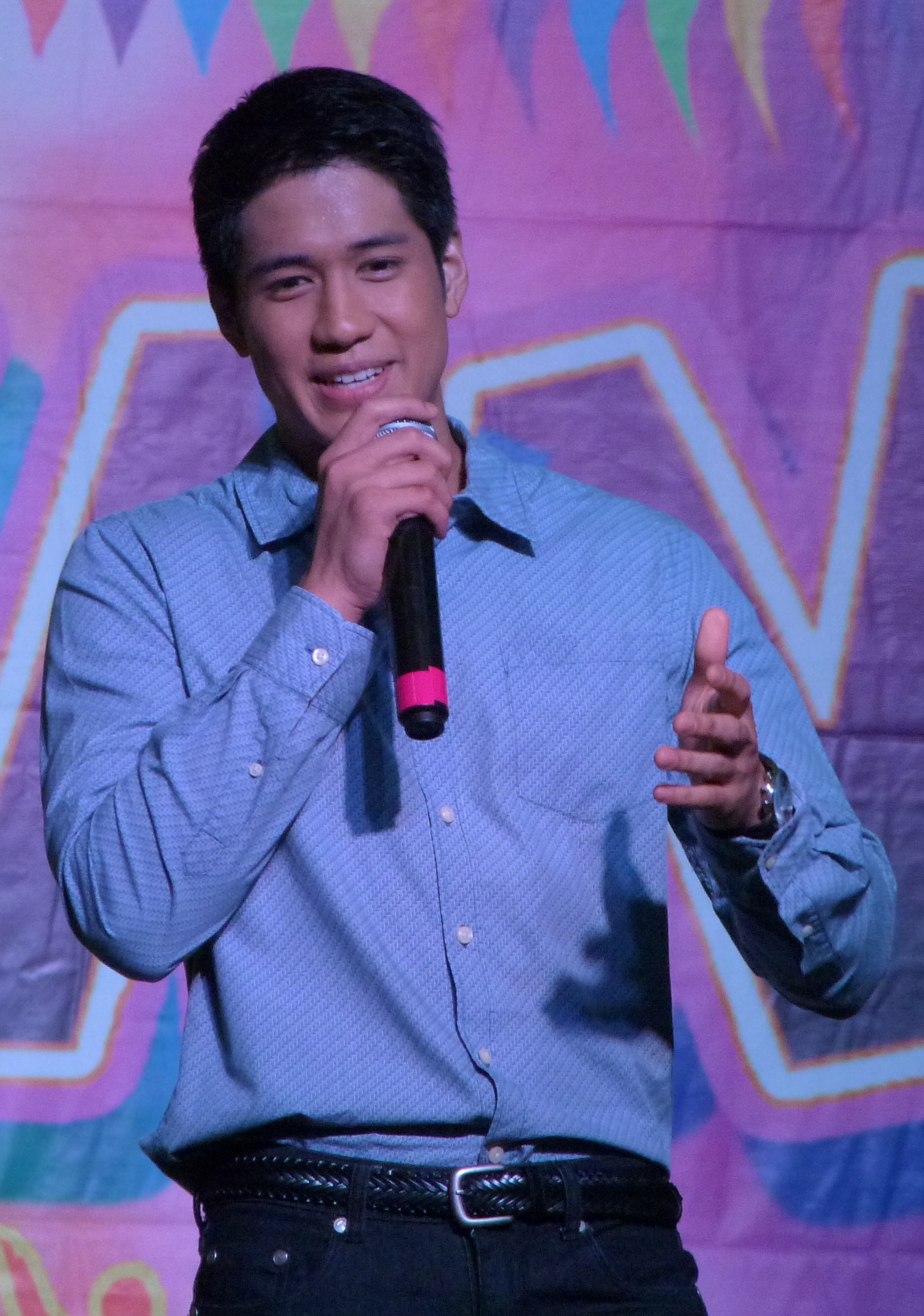
Aljur Abrenica

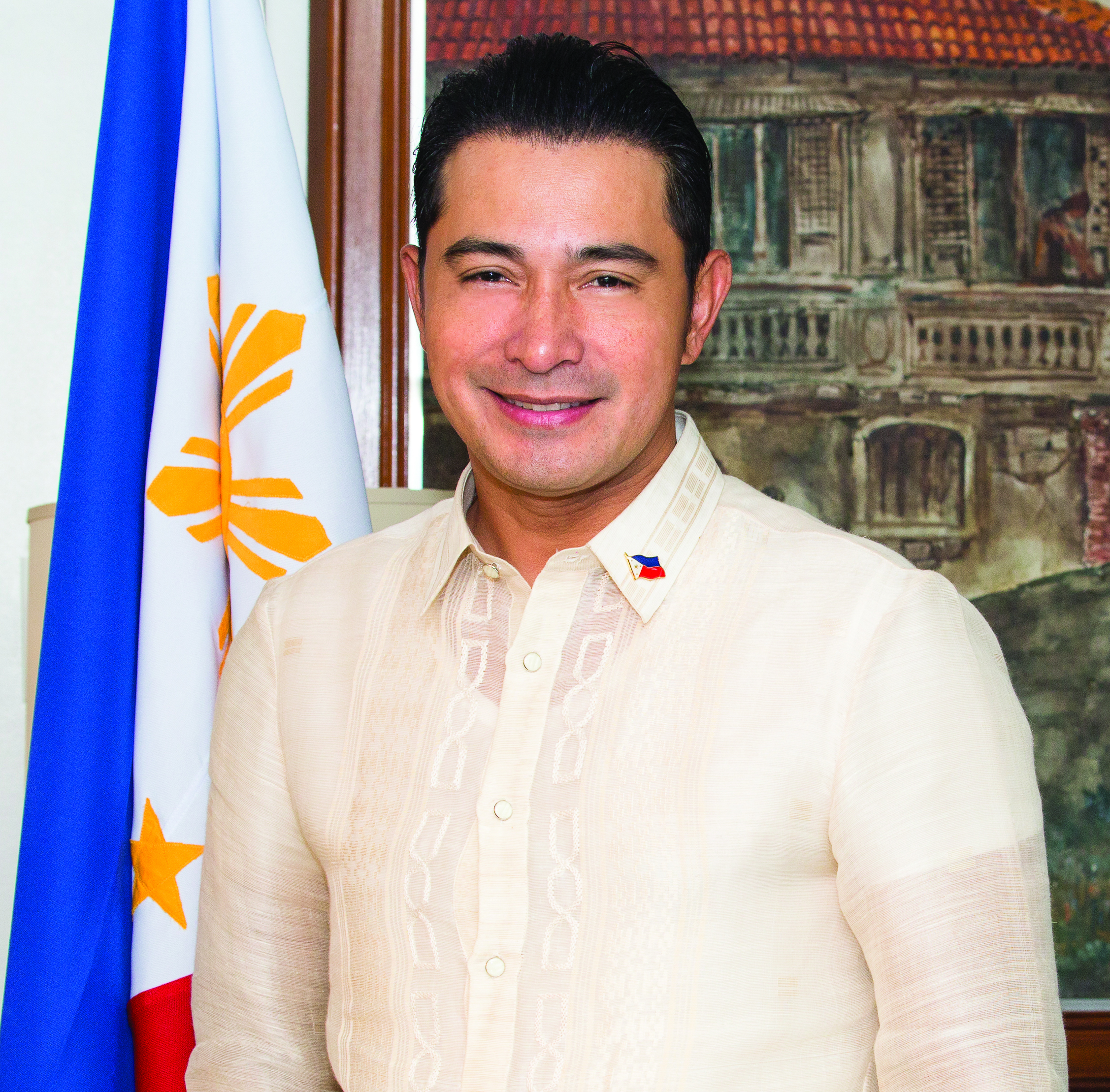
Cesar Montano

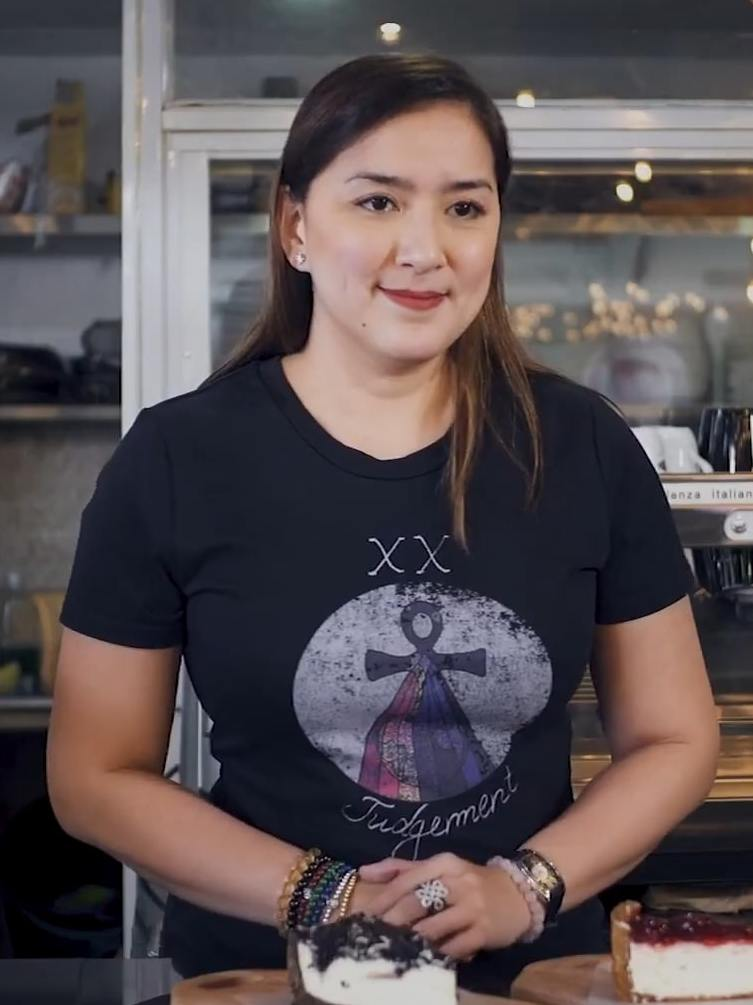
Ara Mina

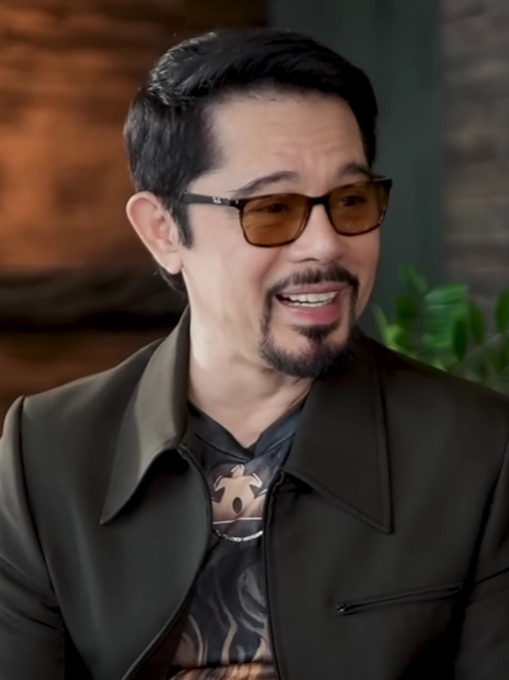
Christopher de Leon

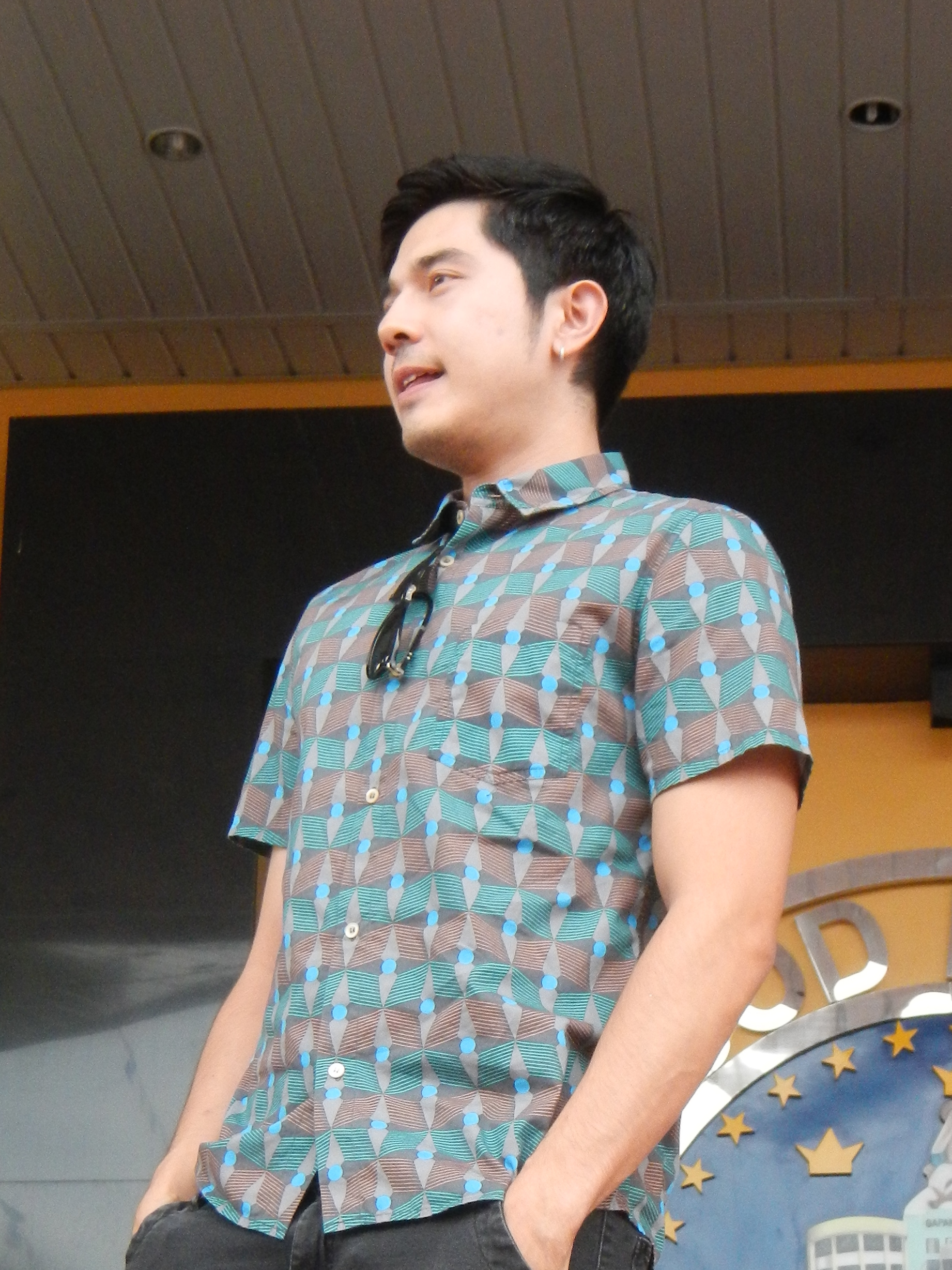
Paulo Avelino

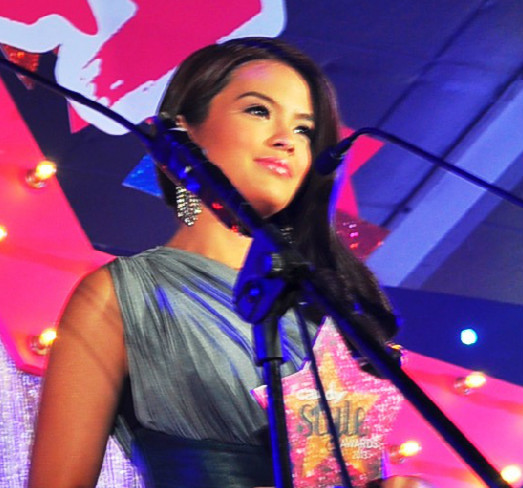
Bea Binene

Lead cast

- Rhian Ramos as Romana Sebastian
- Aljur Abrenica as Iñigo Salcedo
- Jackie Rice as Krisanta Sebastian

Supporting cast

- Cesar Montano as Romano Sebastian
- Jean Garcia as Elvira Montero Azardon de Salcedo and Melina Montero Azardon de Sebastian
- Ara Mina as Elsa Sebastian
- Christopher de Leon as Frederico Salcedo
- Paulo Avelino as Antonio Martinez
- Jake Vargas as Eliseo
- Bea Binene as Evelina Abella
- Sef Cadayona as Renato
- Lexi Fernandez as Stephanie Martinez

Guest cast

- Daniella Amable as younger Romana
- Franchezka Lunar as younger Krisanta
- Rochelle Pangilinan as Elena
- Mia Pangyarihan as Micah
- Yassi Pressman as Ayra
- Izzy Trazona as Shanti
- Sam Pinto as Elizaria
- Carlene Aguilar as Salve
- Precinaida Lopez as Lupe
- Deborah Sun as Pilar
- Cara Eriguel as Sasha
- Ella Cruz as Czarina
- Mika dela Cruz as Sinukuan
- Pen Medina as Francisco
- Arthur Solinap as Carpio
- Kiel Rodriguez as Chiron
- Mara Lopez as Ester
- Shyr Valdez
- Carla Abellana as Hannah
- Bianca King as Raina
- Jillian Ward as Shina
- Edwin Reyes as a mayor
- Jen Rosendahl as Carmen
- Nicole Dulalia as Tina

== Production ==
Principal photography concluded on November 16, 2010.

== Ratings ==
According to AGB Nielsen Philippines' Mega Manila People/Individual television ratings, the pilot episode of Ilumina earned a 14.9% rating. The final episode scored a 15% rating.

== Accolades ==
Accolades received by Ilumina
Year	Award	Category	Recipient	Result	Ref.
2011	25th PMPC Star Awards for Television	Best Primetime TV Series	Ilumina	Nominated	
