= Nita Negrita =

2011 Philippine television drama series

- Title card
- Also known as: Nita
- Genre: Drama
- Created by: Agnes Gagelonia-Uligan
- Written by: Agnes Gagelonia-Uligan; Aloy Adlawan; Michiko Yamamoto; Gin Sardea
- Directed by: Gil Tejada Jr.
- Creative director: Jun Lana
- Starring: Barbie Forteza
- Theme music composer: Agatha Obar
- Opening theme: "Hanggang Kailan" by Joanna Cosme
- Country of origin: Philippines
- Original language: Tagalog
- No. of episodes: 83

Production
- Executive producer: Mona Coles-Mayuga
- Production locations: Manila, Philippines
- Camera setup: Multiple-camera setup
- Running time: 30–45 minutes
- Production company: GMA Entertainment TV

Original release
- Network: GMA Network
- Release: February 14 – June 10, 2011

Nita Negrita (international title: Nita) is a 2011 Philippine television drama series broadcast by GMA Network. Directed by Gil Tejada Jr., it stars Barbie Forteza in the title role. It premiered on February 14, 2011 on the network's Dramarama sa Hapon line up. The series concluded on June 10, 2011, with a total of 83 episodes.

== Cast and characters ==
Cast

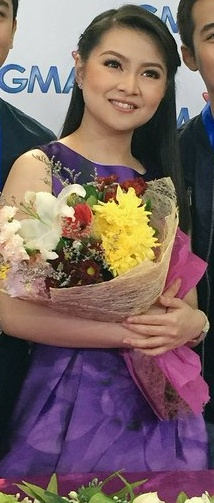
Barbie Forteza

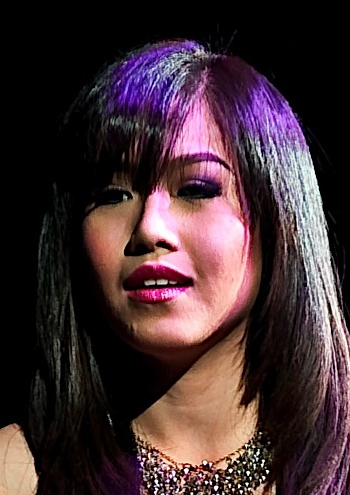
Rachelle Ann Go

Lead cast

- Barbie Forteza as Antoinette "Netnet" Buenaventura / Nita Raymundo

Supporting cast

- Joshua Dionisio as Prince Ramirez
- Lexi Fernandez as Mystica "Misty" Del Castillo
- Nova Villa as Ima
- Lotlot de Leon as Mirasol "Mira" Buenaventura
- Zoren Legaspi as Arturo Del Castillo
- Diana Zubiri as Danica
- Rachelle Ann Go as Amanda Del Castillo
- Bubbles Paraiso as Alexandra "Alex" Del Castillo
- Lollie Mara as Andrea Del Castillo
- Jenny Miller as Pia Antonio
- Dexter Doria as Segunda
- Jim Pebangco as Ben
- Alvin Aguilar as Edgar
- Miguel Tanfelix as Jun Jun
- Michelle Vito as Peachy
- Jhoana Marie Tan as Selyang
- Glenda Garcia as Belen Buenaventura
- Mel Kimura as Bella
- Sabrina San Diego
- Jana Victoria

Guest cast

- Melijah Panturilla as younger Misty
- Edelweiss Tuzon as younger Nita

== Ratings ==
According to AGB Nielsen Philippines' Mega Manila People/Individual television ratings, the pilot episode of Nita Negrita earned a 7.8% rating. The final episode scored a 19.1% rating in Mega Manila household television ratings.

== Controversy ==
The show's use of blackface was criticized in the media and by academics. Axel Honneth professor of philosophy at both the University of Frankfurt and Columbia University stated that the show "presents the stereotypical theme of poverty being ascribed with skin colour."
