= Ynna Asistio =

Filipino actress

Ynna Asistio-Carbonell
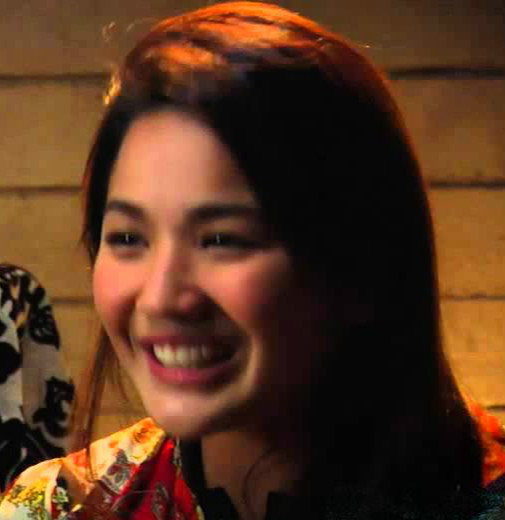
- Born: Alynna Alexandra Montenegro Asistio; September 27, 1991 (age 35); Caloocan, Philippines
- Years active: 2006–present
- Agents: GMA Artist Center (2006–2013); Star Magic (2013–2019); Viva Artist Agency (2019–present)
- Spouse: Waldolf Carbonell (m. 2022)
- Children: 1

Alynna Alexandra Asistio-Carbonell (born September 27, 1991) is a Filipina actress. She was a contract artist of GMA Network and moved to ABS-CBN in August 2013. She is known for her roles in the GMA network's shows like the telefantasya Mga Mata ni Anghelita, Who's Your Daddy Now? and La Vendetta. She appeared on ABS-CBN's game show Minute-to-Win-It. She also appeared on the weekend drama anthology Maalaala Mo Kaya.

== Personal life ==
She is the daughter of actress Nadia Montenegro and former Caloocan Mayor, Macario "Boy" Asistio, Jr. and the niece of Hazel Ann Mendoza. Asistio has dated high-profile Philippine actors such as Mark Herras and Derek Ramsay. Asistio is of Spanish descent on her mother's side. Asistio lives in Ayala Heights in Quezon City.

Asistio was afflicted with polyendocrine metabolic ovarian syndrome (PMOS) at age 13. She and Mark Herras were partners since 2008 until their breakup in 2013. In July 2022, she married Bully Carbonel, and welcomed their child Ava Zafina.

== Filmography ==
=== Film ===
Year	Title	Role
2008	CONCERTO!	Maria
2011	Tween Academy: Class of 2012	Cameo
2011	The Road	Martha
2019	Tabon	Erika

=== Television ===
Year	Title	Role
2006	Candies	Host
2007	Who's Your Daddy Now?	Andrea
2007	Let's Go	Allie
2007	SOP Rules	Herself
2007	Mga Mata ni Anghelita	Lisa
2007	La Vendetta	Alex Cardinale
2008	Philippines Scariest Challenge	Herself
2009	ASAP	Herself
2009	Dear Friend: Special	Ella
2009	George and Cecil	Diane
2009	Sana Ngayong Pasko	Happy
2010	SRO Cinemaserye Presents: Meet The Fathers	Chezka
2010	Party Pilipinas	Herself
2010	Diva	Vanessa
2010	Puso ng Pasko: Artista Challenge	Challenger
2011	Jillian	Jenny
2011	Reel Love: Tween Hearts	Yza
2011	Sisid	Gina
2011	Spooky Nights Presents: Sumpa	Cindy
2012	Maynila	Ynna
2012	My Beloved	Lyzette
2012	Sana ay Ikaw na Nga	Esmeralda Garela
2013	Bubble Gang	Herself
2013	Wagas: Amy & Orly	Young Amy
2013	Minute to Win It	Herself Guest Celebrity Player with her mother Nadia Montenegro
2013	Maalaala Mo Kaya: Saranggola	Jennelyn Marollano
2013	It's Showtime	Herself Guest Hurado with her sister Yana Asistio
2013–2014	Maria Mercedes	Eula
2014	Banana Split	Herself/Guest performer
2014	Maalaala Mo Kaya: Itak	Sheryl
2014	Maalaala Mo Kaya: Saklay	Merlinda
2014	Two Wives	Jessica A. Soler
2015	Maalaala Mo Kaya: Parol	Jessie
2015	Ipaglaban Mo!: Pangarap na Pagtanggap	Amor
2015	Ipaglaban Mo!: Buhay mo o buhay ko?	Amelia
2015	On the Wings of Love	Maggie Regalado
2016	Ipaglaban Mo!: Pagkakamali	Sarah
2016	Maalaala Mo Kaya: Kahon	young Malou
2017	Maalaala Mo Kaya: Piyesa	Maimai
2017	Ipaglaban Mo!: Tali	Grace Alcantara
2019	FPJ's Ang Probinsyano	Vanessa
2020	Ang Daigdig Ko'y Ikaw	Reina
