= The Road (2011 film) =

Film by Yam Laranas

- Theatrical release poster
- Directed by: Yam Laranas
- Written by: Yam Laranas
- Screenplay by: Aloy Adlawan; Yam Laranas
- Produced by: Jose Mari Abacan; Annette Gozon-Abrogar
- Starring: Carmina Villarroel; Marvin Agustin; TJ Trinidad; Rhian Ramos; Barbie Forteza; Alden Richards; Lexi Fernandez; Louise delos Reyes; Derrick Monasterio; Ynna Asistio; Renz Valerio
- Cinematography: Yam Laranas
- Edited by: Mae Carzon; Yam Laranas
- Music by: Johan Soderqvist
- Production company: GMA Films
- Distributed by: GMA Films
- Release date: November 30, 2011
- Running time: 115 minutes
- Country: Philippines
- Languages: Filipino; English
- Box office: ₱60.8 million

The Road (stylized as The Яoad) is a 2011 Filipino horror anthology film written and directed by Yam Laranas. Divided into three stories, the film stars Carmina Villarroel, Marvin Agustin, TJ Trinidad, Rhian Ramos, Barbie Forteza, Alden Richards, Lexi Fernandez, Louise delos Reyes, Derrick Monasterio, Ynna Asistio, and Renz Valerio. The film follows a group of individuals whose lives become connected by a deserted road haunted by the victims of a decades-old crime and their vengeful spirits inhabiting it.

Upon release, the film received mixed reviews and moderate success. It was released in the Philippines by GMA Films on November 30, 2011, and in the United States by Freestyle Releasing on May 11, 2012.

The film is streaming online on YouTube.

== Plot ==
=== Prologue ===
Luis is a policeman who receives a medal for his skill in investigations, despite his record of recklessness. Soon after, a woman asks the police for new information about her missing daughters Joy and Lara. Luis begins his investigation, despite his colleague Greg advising him against giving her false hope.

=== Story 1: 2008 ===
Ella sneaks out at night with her cousin Janine and Janine's boyfriend Brian so that Janine can practice for her driver's test. While driving, they see a police vehicle, which scares them as none of them have licenses. Brian then accidentally drives into a gate blocking an isolated dirt road. He then drives onto the road, thinking it is the perfect spot for Janine to practice driving. Soon, they notice a driverless red car repeatedly overtaking them. Brian tries to drive away but discovers that they are stuck in an endless loop, passing by the same tree again and again. They re-encounter the red car, now crashed. Ella calls her father Eric for assistance, but the red car suddenly burns. As they try to leave, their car stalls, and Ella stays behind while Brian and Janine leave to get help. While walking through the woods, they see the ghost of a burned woman. Janine loses Brian, returns to their car, and flees with Ella. When a ghost appears under the wheel and scares them, a panicked Ella falls out of the car while Janine loses control and hits her head. Ella screams again upon seeing the burned woman's ghost.

Later, Luis and some officers, accompanied by Eric, arrive at the road. They find both Brian and Janine lifeless, but they are unable to find Ella. Luis and Officer Allan find a house deep within the woods. Greg tells them that he already searched the house and that Ella is not there. They also find the crashed red car, where Luis finds a skeleton with a locket.

At the morgue, it is revealed that the skeleton is that of Lara, whom her mother identifies through her locket.

=== Story 2: 1998 ===
Lara is driving with Joy on the same road. Their car overheats after passing a teenage boy walking by. They ask him for water. The boy then takes them to his house in the woods. While waiting for him outside, Lara has a bad feeling and tells Joy that they should leave. As they try to, the boy returns and assaults them.

Lara wakes up hours later, with her foot chained. She hears Joy screaming for help and begging the boy to let them go. He takes Joy to the basement and beats her. Moments later, he returns Joy to the room beside her sister. The boy leaves Lara alone after she scratches him. After freeing herself, Lara searches for Joy, but she is not there. She escapes the house but falls into a pit with corpses, Joy among them. As Lara flees, the boy takes their car and hits her with it. He then knocks her out, wraps a plastic bag around her head, and ties up her neck and hands. He then crashes the car, which he leaves to burn with her inside.

In the present, Luis takes the officers back to the same house to look for Ella. He and Allan find a picture of the house's old owners. Luis finds Ella, who was not noticed by Greg. She faints and is brought to an ambulance. As Eric tries to talk to her, she says that their car overheated and they asked a teenage boy for water, revealing that Lara had possessed Ella. Luis and Allan decide to return to the house.

=== Story 3: 1988 ===
A young boy lives with his family in the house deep in the woods. As he looks out his window, he sees Martha, the family's laundrywoman. The boy's abusive mother, Carmela, tells Martha to come back tomorrow morning. Mistaking her son's conversation with Martha as an attempt to leave the house, Carmela locks him in a cabinet. That night, the boy's father, Pedro, a preacher, comes home and lets him out. The boy is isolated because his parents believe that the outside world is full of sin, and Carmela's bitterness is due to the family's poverty, with Pedro refusing to ask his congregation for money. The next day, an enraged Carmela accidentally kills Martha after seeing her playing with her son. Later, the boy sees Carmela hugging another man. Pedro convinces an adamant Carmela, who is planning to leave him and the boy for the man, not to do it. As the boy listens, he passes out by his bed. At breakfast, a drunken Pedro tells him that Carmela left them. The boy insists that his mother is still there, and in a fit of rage, Pedro reveals that he killed Carmela. Frightened, the boy locks himself in the cabinet, where he sees Martha's corpse. He soon comes out and enters his parents' room, only to see that Pedro has hanged himself. It is revealed that the boy did not leave the house until he grew older and that he killed Joy and Lara.

=== Epilogue ===
In the present, Luis and Allan return to the house. They find a room with a new lock and beat down its door. As they look around, Allan finds Luis' medal. Luis knocks him out, wraps his head with a sheet, and strangles him, revealing that the boy who killed Joy and Lara was none other than Luis himself. He leaves as the other cops search the house. Meanwhile, Eric asks Ella who the boy was. Still possessed, she points at Luis. Luis shoots the police chief as he calls out to him. Attempting to drive away, his car stalls. The ghosts of Joy and Lara appear in his car, with the latter making him shoot himself. Later, the other cops find Luis in his car, dead.

The film ends with Luis as a young boy, finally able to leave home.

== Cast ==
=== Main ===
- TJ Trinidad as Luis Medina
  - Alden Richards as teenage Luis Medina
    - Renz Valerio as young Luis Medina
- Carmina Villarroel as Carmela
- Marvin Agustin as Pedro
- Rhian Ramos as Lara
- Barbie Forteza as Ella
- Lexi Fernandez as Janine
- Louise delos Reyes as Joy
- Derrick Monasterio as Brian
- Ynna Asistio as Martha

=== Supporting ===
- Jaclyn Jose as Sandra
- John Regala as Chief
- Allan Paule as Greg
- Lloyd Samartino as Eric
- Gerald Madrid as Allan
- Ana Abad Santos as Josephine
- Dex Quindoza as Mail man

== Production ==
According to its director/writer Yam Laranas, the film took five years to make, and was also intended to be released internationally. He also said, the movie is partly inspired by various real life stories including the rape-murder case of the Chiong sisters in 1997.

Yam Laranas and Alloy Adlawan admitted that finding the right actors for the role was not an easy task but they were impressed with the acting approached of actors TJ Trinidad, Alden Richards and Renz Valerio who played the main lead role as Luis Medina in a different timelines of his life. Joining the ensemble cast are Rhian Ramos, Carmina Villarroel, Marvin Agustin, Barbie Forteza, Louise delos Reyes, Derrick Monasterio, Lexi Fernandez, Ynna Asistio, John Regala, Lloyd Samartino, Gerald Madrid, Allan Paule and Jacklyn Jose. The shooting took place in Sitio Buhangin, Dalig Teresa, Rizal, Philippines.

The movie is produced and distributed by GMA Films.

== Release ==
According to a tweet by film producer Joey Abacan on January 23, 2012, the film was to be released in U.S. and Canada cinemas within the year. It was scheduled to have a commercial U.S. and Canada theatrical release on May 11, 2012, with English subtitles in over 25 markets/theaters. It was shown again in some selected digital theaters in the Philippines on May 9, 2012.

=== International release ===
These are the dates and country wherein The Road has been released:

Date	Year	Country	Notes	Reference
November 30	2011	Philippines	Released Nationwide	
April 8	2012	Belgium	competed in 30th Brussels International Fantastic Film Festival	
May 9	2012	Philippines (Re-Release)	Selected Digital Theaters only	
May 11	2012	North America	Limited Theaters in North America	
May 24	2012	Singapore	Released Nationwide within Singapore	
October 29	2012	Belgium		

(notes: International Release is different from International Screening)

=== Home media ===
The Road′s director, Yam Laranas, announced that the film would be released onto DVD and Blu-ray formats on Tuesday, July 10, 2012.

== Reception ==
=== Box office ===
As of May 13, 2012, the film opened with an estimated $61,200 in North America, ranking 27th in the box office, along with $849,565 in the Philippines, for a worldwide total of $910,765. The film has grossed $5,455 for the reshowing in the Philippines.

=== Critical response ===
Professional ratings
Review scores
Source	Rating
Click The City	3.5/5 stars

The Road has received mixed feedback from film critics, with a current 65% rating and an average rating out of 5.9/10 critics on the review aggregator website Rotten Tomatoes, based on 17 reviews. Reviewers have praised the atmosphere and the cinematography of the film, but panned its storyline and editing.

Jeannette Catsoulis of The New York Times wrote, "A powerfully atmospheric blend of ghostly encounters, horrific situations and missing-persons mysteries from the Philippine director Yam Laranas." Robert Abele of the Los Angeles Times remarked, "The film's three-pronged narrative does a fair job of laying a spooky groundwork for the revelatory emotional sadism that lies behind most acts of evil; it just takes a bit of clunky exposition to get there." V.A. Musetto of the New York Post wrote, "(Laranas) delivers a maximum of suspense and horror, working wonders with a small budget." Sam Adams of The A.V. Club gave a positive review, saying "The Road spends most of its time going in circles, working and reworking a small set of potent images. There’s a fine line between simple and crude, and The Road weaves back and forth over it like a rattletrap with a sudden flat, but Laranas makes a virtue of his limited means, steering clear of distraction and into the heart of darkness."

A mixed review came from Ed Gonzales of Slant Magazine, who gave the film 2 stars out of four, saying, "For a spell, the film gets by on its unpretentious flair for atmosphere, even its disconcerting nonsensicality."

Philbert Ortiz Dy of Click The City gave the film 3.5 out of 5 stars. he stated, "But The Road, like many horror films today, is insistent on providing some sort of twist, regardless of how little sense it actually makes. The whole package is still pretty good, but it’s difficult to ignore that particular misstep." ... That aside, this is a pretty decent horror experience. The film runs a little long, but part of that is due to the film’s patience. The film isn't just trying to shock people. It builds atmosphere and constructs horrific situations that are meant to genuinely disturb. It isn't just about ghosts popping out of nowhere. It's more about the creeping realization that there are some things in this world that aren't quite right, and people are going to get hurt because of it. Laranas’ meticulously composed frames make great use of the interplay between light and shadow, setting up an eerie atmosphere that permeates every second of the film.[...].

=== Accolades ===
List of awards and nominations
Award	Date of Ceremony	Category	Nominee	Result	Ref
PMPC Star Awards for Movies	March 14, 2012	Movie of the Year		Nominated	
PMPC Star Awards for Movies	March 14, 2012	Movie Director of the Year	Yam Laranas	Nominated	
PMPC Star Awards for Movies	March 14, 2012	New Movie Actor of the Year	Alden Richards	Nominated	
PMPC Star Awards for Movies	March 14, 2012	Movie Cinematographer of the Year	Yam Laranas	Nominated	
Golden Screen Awards	March 24, 2012	Breakthrough Performance by an Actress	Lexi Fernandez	Nominated	
Golden Screen Awards	March 24, 2012	Breakthrough Performance by an Actor	Alden Richards	Nominated	
Golden Screen Awards	March 24, 2012	Breakthrough Performance by an Actor	Derrick Monasterio	Nominated	
Golden Screen Awards	March 24, 2012	Best Cinematographer	Yam Laranas	Nominated	
Golden Screen Awards	March 24, 2012	Best Sound	Albert Michael Idioma	Won	
Golden Screen Awards	March 24, 2012	Best Musical Score	Johan Soderqvist	Nominated	
Golden Screen Awards	March 24, 2012	Best Visual Effects	Underground Logic	Nominated	
FAMAS Awards	September 24, 2012	Best Picture		Nominated	
FAMAS Awards	September 24, 2012	Best Director	Yam Laranas	Nominated	
FAMAS Awards	September 24, 2012	Best Actor	TJ Trinidad	Nominated	
FAMAS Awards	September 24, 2012	Best Actress	Rhian Ramos	Nominated	
FAMAS Awards	September 24, 2012	Best Supporting Actor	Marvin Agustin	Nominated	
FAMAS Awards	September 24, 2012	Best Supporting Actress	Carmina Villarroel	Nominated	
FAMAS Awards	September 24, 2012	Best Child Actor	Renz Valerio	Nominated	
FAMAS Awards	September 24, 2012	Best Screenplay	Yam Laranas, Aloy Adlawan	Nominated	
FAMAS Awards	September 24, 2012	Best Story	Yam Laranas	Nominated	
FAMAS Awards	September 24, 2012	Best Cinematography	Yam Laranas	Nominated	
FAMAS Awards	September 24, 2012	Best Art Direction	Melchor Defensor	Nominated	
FAMAS Awards	September 24, 2012	Best Sound	Alex Tomboc, Lamberto Casas Jr., Addiss Tabong	Nominated	
FAMAS Awards	September 24, 2012	Best Editing	Mae Carzon, Yam Laranas	Nominated	
FAMAS Awards	September 24, 2012	Best Special Effects	Jessie Abiva, Carlo Abello, Ryan Abugan	Nominated	
FAMAS Awards	September 24, 2012	Best Visual Effects	Nathaniel Robite, Joseph Ramos, Ryan Jose Ticsay	Nominated	
FAMAS Awards	September 24, 2012	Best Musical Score	Johan Söderqvist	Nominated	

== See also ==
- List of films featuring time loops
