= Rhian Ramos =

Filipino actress, model, singer (born 1990)

- Born: Rhian Denise Ramos Howell; October 3, 1990 (age 36)
- Occupations: Actress; model; singer; host
- Years active: 2006–present
- Relatives: Ronnie Henares (uncle)

Rhian Denise Ramos Howell (Tagalog: [ˈɾijɐn ˈɾamos]; born October 3, 1990) is a Filipino actress, model, singer, host and race car driver. She starred in the drama fantasy series Encantadia Chronicles: Sanggre as the main antagonist Kera Mitena.

== Early life ==
Rhian Denise Ramos Howell on October 3, 1990. Her parents are Gareth Howell and Clara (née Ramos). Her sibling is Nadine Ramos Howell. When her parents separated, her father married a Thai woman. She is a niece of Ida Ramos and Ronnie Henares.

== Career ==
Ramos started working in commercials including McDonald's Philippines McJelly Trio. Her first television series was Captain Barbell in 2006, and a year later she was part of Lupin. She has played the lead role in My Only Love.

In 2007, Ramos had her film debut in The Promise in which she won her first Golden Screen Award for Breakthrough Performance by an Actress. She also starred in the horror film Ouija. In 2008, Ramos was chosen to host Pinoy Idol Extra, the daily update edition of Pinoy Idol. Ramos also starred in two Philippine dramas, Codename: Asero, and in LaLola, a remake of the 2007 Argentine television comedy telenovela of the same name. By the end of the year, Ramos finished two feature films, My Monster Mom and I.T.A.L.Y.. LaLola ended in February 2009. She starred in the suspense-thriller film Sundo that came out the following month. In 2009, she starred in two Philippine dramas: Zorro and Stairway to Heaven.

Ramos released her debut dance-music album Audition Dance Battle under Universal Records in partnership with Bellhaus Entertainment. Ramos starred in the fantasy film Ang Panday. She is the muse of the B-Meg Llamados for the 2011–2012 season of the Philippine Basketball Association.

In 2015, Ramos played the lead role in the television series The Rich Man's Daughter as Jade Tanchingco, alongside Glaiza de Castro who played Ramos' love interest.

In 2018, it was announced that Ramos would be the lead in the Manila-set independent film Empty by Design starring alongside Australian actor Chris Pang and Canadian actor Osric Chau.

== Personal life ==
Ramos dated Mark Herras in 2007. Between 2008 and 2009, she dated JC de Vera and later KC Montero and race car driver Jason Choachuy.

Actor and multi-level marketing businessman Sam Verzosa announced in August 2022, that he has been dating Ramos. In March 2026, Ramos said they had broken up months prior.

== Filmography ==
=== Acting performances in television dramas ===
Year	Title	Role
2006–2007	Mars Ravelo's Captain Barbell	Leah Lazaro
2007	Lupin	Avril Legarda
2007–2008	Sine Novela: My Only Love	Cindy Moreno
2008	Codename: Asero	Claire Morales
2008–2009	LaLola	Lolita "Lola" Padilla
2009	Zorro	Lolita Pulido
2009	Stairway to Heaven	Jodi Reyes / Jenna Cruz
2010	Ilumina	Romana Sebastian
2010	Bantatay	English Bulldog
2011	Beauty Queen	Herself/Pageant Host
2011	Mars Ravelo's Captain Barbell	Leah Lazaro-Magtanggol
2013	Indio	Magayon
2013	Genesis	Raquel Hernandez
2014	My Destiny	Joy Dela Rosa
2015	The Rich Man's Daughter	Jade Tanchingco
2015	Dangwa	Sheryl "She" Cruz
2016	Sinungaling Mong Puso	Clara Pamintuan
2017	My Love from the Star	Rachel Andrada
2018	The One That Got Away	Sophia Elizabeth "Zoe" Velasquez
2020–2021	Love of My Life	Kelly Generoso
2022	Artikulo 247	Mary Jane "MJ" Ortega-Borromeo
2023	Royal Blood	Margaret Royales-Castor
2024	Pulang Araw	Filipina "Fina" Dela Cruz
2024	Lilet Matias: Attorney-at-Law	Mia Cruz
2025–2026	Encantadia Chronicles: Sang'gre	Kera Mitena
2026–present	Taskforce Firewall	Tasha

=== Anthology ===
Year	Title	Role	Notes
2006	Maynila: Heart Beat	Mia	
2007	Mga Kuwento ni Lola Basyang	Sharay	
2010	Dear Friend: Almost a Love Story	Hannah	
2014	Wagas Anniversary Special	Monica	
2014	Magpakailanman: Life After Death	Jane Sison	
2014	Magpakailanman: Ang Biyudang Nakaitim	Rebecca "Bega"	
2015	Magpakailanman: PO2 Ephraim Mejia Story	May	
2015	Wagas: Nati & Dolfo Love Story	Nati	
2016	Magpakailanman: Ang Kakambal Kong Ahas	Melissa	
2020	I Can See You: Truly. Madly. Deadly	Abby Lopez	
2022	Happy ToGetHer	Teacher Katrina "Joyful" Hernandez	
2023	Magpakailanman: Ang Hiling sa Diyos	Vangie Uy-Cuaki	

=== Comedy ===
Year	Title	Role	Notes
2006–2007	Daddy Di Do Du	Aileen	Supporting cast
2006; 2017; 2025	Bubble Gang	Herself / Various	Guest
2009	Show Me Da Manny	Claudia	Guest
2010	Kaya ng Powers	Hillary Jackson Powers	Main role
2010	Pepito Manaloto	Ara Crisostomo	Guest role
2011	Spooky Nights: Snow White Lady and the Seven Ghost	Snow	
2013	Pepito Manaloto: Ang Tunay na Kuwento	Ara Crisostomo	Guest role
2015	Sabado Badoo		Cameo featured footage
2015	Vampire ang Daddy Ko	Vivi	Guest
2016–2017	Tsuperhero	Espie / Espirikitik	Supporting cast
2022	Running Man Philippines	Herself	Guest

=== Hosting ===
Year	Title	Notes
2006–2010	SOP	Performer / Co-host
2008	Pinoy Idol Extra	Host
2010	Puso ng Pasko: Artista Challenge	Host
2010–2013	Party Pilipinas	Performer / Co-host
2011	In the Limelight	Main host
2011	Manny Many Prizes	Co-host
2013–2015	Sunday All Stars	Performer / Co-host
2015–2018	Taste Buddies	Main host
2021	Wowowin	Guest co-host
2021–present	All-Out Sundays	Performer / Main host
2022–2023	TiktoClock	Guest co-host
2025	Where in Manila	Main host

=== Television film ===
Year	Title	Role
2017	Love is...	Chloe

=== Acting performances in film ===
Year	Title	Role
2007	The Promise	Monique
2007	Ouija	Ruth
2008	My Monster Mom	Young Esmeralda Fajardo
2008	I.T.A.L.Y.	Phoebe Villaroso
2009	Sundo	Isabel
2009	Ang Panday	Emelita
2011	My Valentine Girls	Aia
2011	The Road	Lara
2011	Ang Panday 2	Emelita
2012	My Kontrabida Girl	Isabel Reyes
2012	Sosy Problems	Lizzie Consunji
2015	Silong	Valerie
2016	Saving Sally	Sally
2017	Fallback	Michelle
2018	The Trigonal	Annie Casa
2018	Tres	
2018	Kung Paano Siya Nawala	Shana
2019	Empty by Design	Samantha
2023	Ikaw at Ako	Marga
2024	Bounty Man	Detective Carmen
2024	When the World Met Miss Probinsyana	Marge
2024	Huwag Mo 'Kong Iwan	Lara
2025	Sinagtala	Paola
2026	I Fell, It’s Fine	Chicks

== Modelling ==
Year	Month	Magazine	Role
2004	May	Candy Magazine	Cover Girl
2006	September	Women's Journal Magazine	Cover Girl
2006	October	Candy Magazine	Cover Girl
2007	February	Seventeen-Mini Magazine	Cover Girl
2007	April	Total Girl Magazine	Cover Girl
2007	May	MEG Magazine	Cover Girl
2007	June	S Magazine	Cover Girl
2007	November	Chalk Magazine	Cover Girl
2008	October	Cosmopolitan Magazine	Cover Girl
2008	December	Preview Magazine	Cover Girl
2008	December	Mega Magazine	Cover Girl
2009	January	Mega Magazine	Cover Girl
2009	November	Health Today Magazine	Cover Girl
2010	March	METRO Magazine	Cover Girl
2010	March	Speed Magazine	Cover Girl
2010	September	UNO Magazine	Cover Girl
2010	October	MEG Magazine	Cover Girl
2011	January	Gadgets Magazine	Cover Girl
2011	April	METRO Magazine	Cover Girl
2012	January	Blush Magazine	Cover Girl
2012	August	Total Fitness Magazine	Cover Girl
2012	September	Speed Magazine	Cover Girl
2013	February	Zen Health Magazine	Cover Girl
2013	March	Rogue Magazine	Cover Girl
2015	January	UNO Magazine	Cover Girl
2015	February	BRAND Magazine	Cover Girl
2015	August	SPEED Magazine	Cover Girl
2016	July	FHM Magazine	Cover Girl

== Bibliography ==
Year	Title	Writer
2015	"Love Wins" featuring Rhian Ramos and Glaiza de Castro	Cess Dalmas in collaboration with E.G. Studio Archives

== Discography ==
=== Singles ===
Year	Title	Record label
2009	"You"	Universal Records-GMA Records
2017	"Hear Me ft. DJ Luane and Mecha"	Homeworkz Entertainment Services
2019	"Napagod ft. Brisom"	Rhian Ramos
2019	"Body Crashes ft. Brisom"	Rhian Ramos

== Videography ==
Year	Title	Artist
2009	You	Rhian Ramos
2013	Fall Asleep	Jars of Clay
2019	Napagod	Rhian Ramos ft. Brisom
2019	Body Crashes	Rhian Ramos ft. Brisom

== Awards ==
Year	Award giving body	Category	Work	Result
2007	Golden Screen Awards	Breakthrough Performance by an Actress	The Promise	Won
2007	21st PMPC Star Awards for TV	Best New Female TV Personality	Captain Barbell	Nominated
2007	FHM 100 Sexiest Women in the World (Philippines)	#20		
2008	24th PMPC Star Awards for Movies	New Movie Actress of the Year	Ouija	Nominated
2008	5th Golden Screen Awards	Breakthrough Performance by an Actress	Ouija	Won
2008	FHM 100 Sexiest Women in the World (Philippines)	#24		
2008	Asia Supermodel Contest	Miss Vitality		
2009	YES Magazine 100 Most Beautiful Women	Primetime Ladies Category		
2009	FHM 100 Sexiest Women in the World (Philippines)	#12		
2009	35th Metro Manila Film Festival	Best Supporting Actress	Ang Panday	Nominated
2010	Asian Model Awardee (Korea)			Won
2010	YES Magazine 100 Most Beautiful Stars	#23		
2010	FHM 100 Sexiest Women in the World (Philippines)	#17		
2010	26th PMPC Star Awards for Movies	Movie Supporting Actress of the Year	Ang Panday	Nominated
2010	58th FAMAS Awards	Best Supporting Actress	Ang Panday	Nominated
2011	FHM 100 Sexiest Women in the World (Philippines)	#20		
2012	FHM 100 Sexiest Women in the World (Philippines)	#55		
2012	60th FAMAS Awards	Best Actress	The Road	Nominated
2013	27th PMPC Star Awards for TV	Best Game Show Host	Manny Many Prizes	Nominated
2015	GMA Blogger's Style Camp	People's Choice Award with Glaiza de Castro	The Rich Man's Daughter	Won
2015	GMA Blogger's Style Camp	Female Super Stunner	The Rich Man's Daughter	Nominated
2015	GMA Blogger's Style Camp	Judging with Glaiza de Castro	The Rich Man's Daughter	top 4
2016	32nd PMPC Star Awards for Movies	Movie Actress of the Year	Silong	Nominated
2016	Pep List Year 3 Award	Best PEPTalk Episode with Luis Alandy and Glaiza de Castro	The Rich Man's Daughter	Nominated
2016	64th FAMAS Awards	Best Actress	Silong	Nominated
2016	42nd Metro Manila Film Festival	Female Celebrity of the Night	Saving Sally	Won
