= Joshua Dionisio =

Filipino actor

- Born: Ralph Joshua Dela Cruz Dionisio; December 14, 1994 (age 31); Quezon City, Philippines
- Occupations: Actor; dancer; singer; Host; commercial model
- Years active: 2002–2017; 2022; 2024–present
- Agents: Star Magic (2002–2009; 2013–2015); GMA Artist Center (2009–2012; 2017; 2024–present)

Ralph Joshua Dela Cruz Dionisio (born December 14, 1994) is a Filipino television personality and former actor. He was best known for his role as Ken Pamintuan in Super Inggo and the young Cholo in the Philippine remake of Stairway to Heaven.

== Early life ==
Born on December 14, 1994, in Quezon City, he has a younger brother, Jacob, his co-star on Super Inggo. Joshua Dionisio began his career as a commercial model at the age of 8. He was discovered via modeling by ABS-CBN and VIVA Films. He made his first TV appearance as the young Nicolai "Nicos" Argos in Kay Tagal Kang Hinintay.

== Television career ==
Dionisio began his acting career in the kids television action series, Super Inggo, playing Kennedy "Ken" Pamintuan. He also appeared as Maria's childhood lover in the teleserye series Maria Flordeluna and was also one of the lead characters in Kung Fu Kids where he played Jazz, a boy with an ability to control and manipulate energy blasts through his hands.

In 2008, Dionisio won an award at the PMPC Star Awards for Television for the Best Single Performance by an Actor in "Sako" (Sack), an episode of Maalaala Mo Kaya.

In 2009, he moved to GMA 7 via the drama series Stairway To Heaven, a Korean drama adapted for Philippine television, in which he played the role of young Cholo.

He also appeared in GMA Network's primetime TV series First Time in 2010 in the role of Lukas Ynfante. He appeared in Pilyang Kerubin in the role of Michael on the GMA TV series and as Josh in Reel Love Presents: Tween Hearts, where he is with Barbie Forteza. He has returned to networks twice. In 2013, he returned to ABS-CBN. In 2016, he moved to GMA Network.

In 2015, he moved to TV5 via Wattpad Presents.

== Filmography ==
=== Film ===
Year	Title	Role
2003	My First Romance	Xavier
2004	I Will Survive	Buboy
2004	Kulimlim	Dwight Cabrera
2004	Bcuz of U	Jojo
2005	Nasaan Ka Man	Young Ito
2006	Umaaraw, Umuulan	Young Berto
2008	Supahpapalicious	Special Guest
2010	Si Agimat at si Enteng Kabisote	Jayson
2011	Tween Academy: Class of 2012	Robin
2011	Ang Panday 2	Dimayo
2016	Teniente Gimo	Victor

=== Television ===
Year	Title	Role
2002	Kay Tagal Kang Hinintay	Young Nikolai "Nikos" Argos
2003	Maalaala Mo Kaya: Puno	Young AR Santiago
2004	SCQ Reload	Younger brother of Joseph Bitangcol
2005	Panday	Boyet
2005	Vietnam Rose	Young Le Dinh Hieng Huang (Miguel)
2006	Sa Piling Mo	Young Adrian
2006	Super Inggo	Mighty Ken / Kennedy Pamintuan
2007	Maria Flordeluna	Boyet
2007	Margarita	Young Bernard
2007	Maalaala Mo Kaya: Toga	Young Mark
2007	Maalaala Mo Kaya: Sako	Young Giling
2008	Kung Fu Kids	Jaizer Marasigan/Jazz
2008	Palos	Young Giancarlo Caranzo
2008	Maalaala Mo Kaya: Popcorn	Roehl Pascual
2008	Batang X: The Next Generation	Boy Gulang/G-Boy
2008	Your Song: My Only Hope	Daniel/Emo Boy
2009	Precious Hearts Romances Presents: Bud Brothers	Young Rei
2009	Midnight DJ	Dwende/Lapus
2009	Maalaala Mo Kaya: Chess	Jomar
2009	Midnight DJ	Dennis
2009	Nasaan Ka Maruja?	Perry
2009	Agimat: Ang Mga Alamat ni Ramon Revilla presents Tiagong Akyat	Young Baste
2009	Stairway to Heaven	Young Cholo
2009–2010	SOP Fully Charged	Himself/Performer
2009	Dear Friend: My Christmas List	Enzo Sta. Cruz
2009	Katorse	Young Albert Arcanghel
2010	Magkano ang Iyong Dangal?	Young Troy
2010	First Time	Lukas Infante
2010–2012	Party Pilipinas	Himself/Performer
2010	Claudine Present: Madrasta	Iñigo
2010	Pilyang Kerubin	Michael Alvarez
2010	Maynila	Boks
2010–2012	Reel Love Presents: Tween Hearts	Josh Diones / Ross
2011	Nita Negrita	Prince Ramirez
2011	Maynila	Chad
2011	Spooky Nights Presents: Manananggala: Battle of the Half Sisters	Patpat
2011	Maynila	Kean
2011	Ikaw Lang ang Mamahalin	Charles Ballesteros
2012	Maynila	Carlo
2012	Spooky Nights Present: Kalansay	Anton
2012	Maynila	Matt
2012	Pepito Manaloto	Richard
2012	Maynila	Daniel
2013	Apoy sa Dagat	Young teen Liam/Orwell
2013	Maalaala Mo Kaya: Picture Frame	Young Robert
2013	Maalaala Mo Kaya: Bituin	Arwin Manolino
2014	Maalaala Mo Kaya: Kwintas	Young teen Nanding
2014	Klasrum	Himself
2014	Ismol Family	Special Guest
2014	Wansapanataym: Nato De Coco	Paul
2015	Wattpad Presents: Ex Ko Ang Idol Niyo	Bench Nickolai Lim
2015	Wattpad Presents: A Rose Between Two Thorns	Chase
2015	Spotlight Talk Show	Himself/Guest
2016	Eat Bulaga!	Himself/Challenge Accepted Contestant
2016	Magpakailanman	Primo
2017	Wattpad Presents: Special Section	Maxwell
2022	Good Morning Kuya	Himself/host/anchor
2023–2024	Black Rider	Carl P. Gomez
2025	Lolong: Bayani ng Bayan	Gimeno

== Awards and nominations ==
Year	Award-giving body	Category	Result
2008	20th PMPC Star Awards for Television	Best Single Performance by an Actor in an episode of Maalaala Mo Kaya entitled "Sako (Sack)"	Won
2010	58th FAMAS Awards	German Moreno Youth Achievement Award	Won
