= Derrick Monasterio =

Filipino actor and host (born 1995)

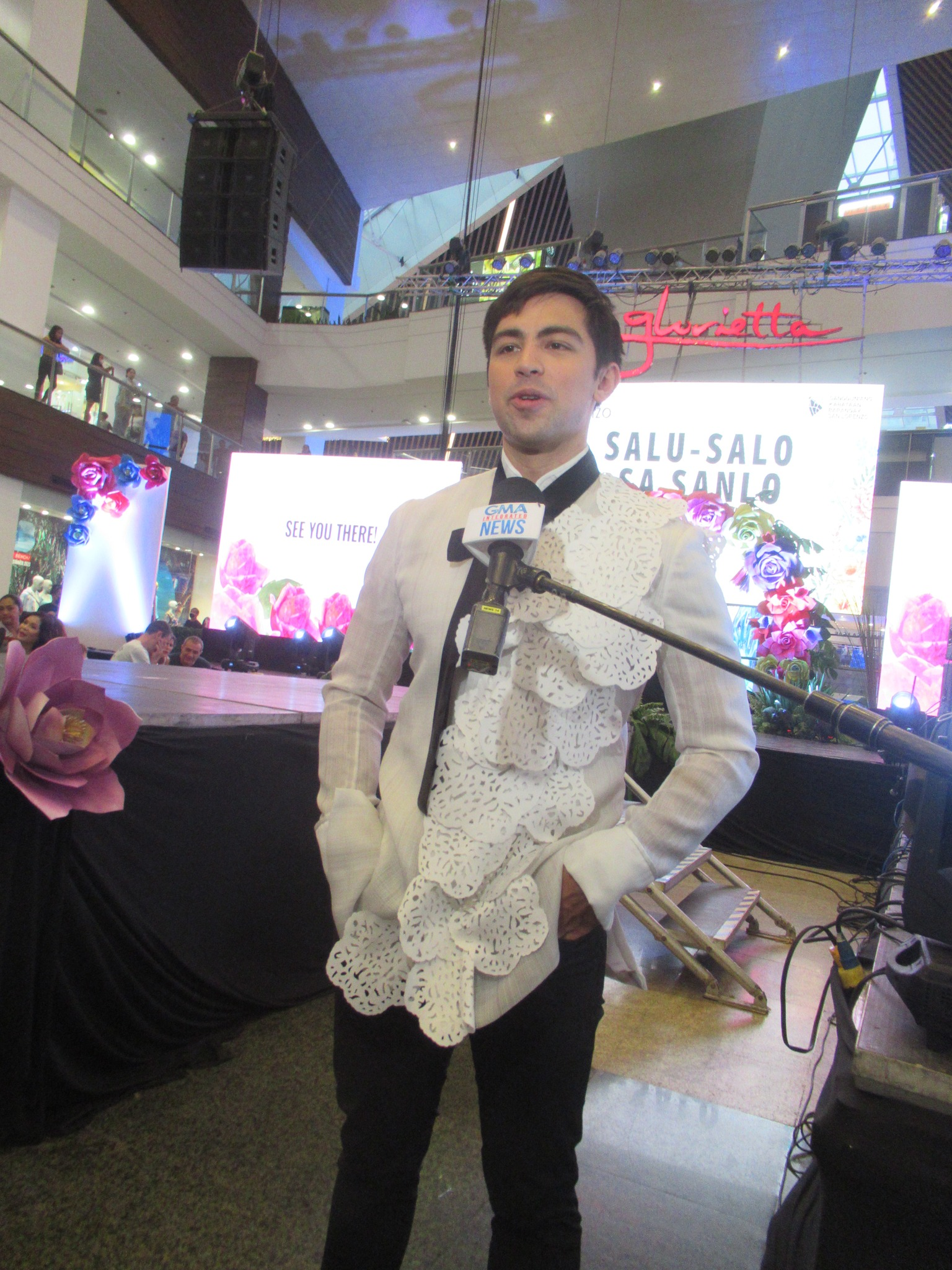
- Monasterio in 2023
- Born: Derrick Leander Monasterio; August 1, 1995 (age 31); Quezon City, Philippines
- Occupations: Actor; singer; host; model
- Years active: 2010–present
- Agent: Sparkle GMA Artist Center (2010–present)
- Height: 6 ft 1 in (185 cm)
- Partner: Elle Villanueva (2023–present)

Derrick Leander Monasterio (born August 1, 1995) is a Filipino actor, singer, host and model. He is the son of Filipina former actress Tina Monasterio.

== Early life and education ==
Derrick Leander Monasterio was born on August 1, 1995, in Quezon City, Philippines to George Crimarco, an American lawyer based in Los Angeles and Tina Monasterio, a former beauty queen and retired actress. He has half-sisters both from his father and mother side.

Monasterio attended high school at Angelicum College in Quezon City. He is pursuing a bachelor's degree in Legal Management at San Beda University.

== Business ==
In 2020, Monasterio launched QUARANLANCEPH, a home service haircut to help jobless barbers earn a living during pandemic. He launched his fitness business Off Grid, a fitness business center with state of the art facility located in Marikina.

In 2025, he purchased 5 lots, 2 lots in Paranque, 2 lots in Antipolo and 1 in Tagaytay, which he plans to build his resthouse.

== Personal life ==
Monsterio previously dated actress Issa Pressman, Former 2018 Miss Manila Kathleen Joy Paton and Brazilian Model Livia Dumont.

He confirmed to be exclusively dating actress Elle Villanueva since 2023.

== Discography ==
=== Studio albums ===
Year	Title	Track listing	Label
2011	Sinner or Saint soundtrack		GMA Records
2012	Tween Academy: Class of 2012 (Original Motion Picture Soundtrack)		GMA Records
2012	One Love, One Heart, One Nation		GMA Records
2012	My Kontrabida Girl soundtrack		GMA Records
2012	The Witness soundtrack		GMA Records
2015	Kailangan Kita (single)		GMA Records
2016	One Heart (with Various Artists)		GMA Records
2016	Derrick Monasterio (self-titled)	1. Kailangan Kita; 2. Bato Balani; 3. Give Me One More Chance; 4. Kailangan Mo, Kailangan Ko; 5. Paano Nga Ba; 6. Reyna; 7. Ang Aking Puso (with Julie Anne San Jose)	GMA Records

== Filmography ==
=== Film ===
Year	Title	Role
2011	Tween Academy: Class of 2012	Maximo
2011	The Road	Brian
2011	My House Husband: Ikaw Na!	Chad
2012	Si Agimat, Si Enteng at Ako	Himself
2013	Boy Golden: Shoot to Kill, the Arturo Porcuna Story	Anton
2014	Full Moon	Javier Dimaculangan
2018	Wild and Free	Jake
2018	Almost A Love Story	Iggy
2019	Kiko en Lala	Rap-rap
2024	G! LU	Ryan

=== Television ===
Year	Title	Role
2010–2012	Reel Love Presents Tween Hearts	Ricardo "Rick" Montano
2010–2013	Party Pilipinas	Himself / Performer
2011	Dwarfina	Darius
2011	Sinner or Saint	Santi
2011	Maynila: No Matter What	Adrian
2011	Maynila: Tatay's Girl	Jay
2011	Maynila: Young Love in Trouble	Ron
2011	Spooky Nights	Derrick
2012	Alice Bungisngis and her Wonder Walis	Spade Fernandez
2012	Luna Blanca (Book 2)	Kiko De Jesus
2012	Maynila: Heart Spikes	Mike
2012	Extra Challenge	Himself / Contestant
2012	Magpakailaman: The Jaylord and John Edric Story	Jaylord Casiño
2012	Maynila: Love Express	Ben
2012–2013	Paroa: Ang Kuwento ni Mariposa	Iñigo Villamor
2013	Maynila: Wait For Love	Paul
2013	Maynila: Trust in Love	Paul
2013	Anna Karenina	Aldrin Monteclaro
2013	Genesis	Randy
2013–2016	Vampire ang Daddy Ko	Derry
2013–2015	Sunday All Stars	Himself / Performer
2014–2015	The Half Sisters	Sebastian "Baste" Torres
2015	Dangwa	Graham
2015	Magpakailanman: Apoy sa Pangarap	Jerome
2015	Karelasyon: Kambal	TJ
2015	Magpakailanman: Preggy Prosti	Jeff
2015	Karelasyon: Piano	Ato
2015	Maynila: Can You Read My Heart	Emil
2015	Maynila: Moments In Time	Jimboy
2015	Wagas: Camille Prats and VJ Yambao Love Story	VJ Yambao
2016	Magpakailanman: Tamang Pag-ibig sa Maling Panahon	Nestor
2016	Hanggang Makita Kang Muli	Calvin Manahan
2016	Karelasyon: Hiya	EJ
2016	Karelasyon: Biktima	PJ
2016	Magpakailanman: Kadugo, Kaaway, Kakampi	Randy
2016–2017	Tsuperhero	Noynoy / Tsuperhero
2017	Voltes V	Steve Armstrong (voice-over)
2017	Mulawin vs. Ravena	Almiro / Rodrigo Manalastas
2017	All Star Videoke	Episode Player
2017	Daig Kayo ng Lola Ko	Langgam, Prince Charming
2018	Inday Will Always Love You	Patrick Melendez
2019	Dragon Lady	Charles Chua Jr.
2019	SMAC Pinoy Ito!	Himself / Guest
2019–2020	Beautiful Justice	Lance Decena
2020	Wowowin	Himself / Guest / Performer
2020–present	All-Out Sundays	Himself / Main host / Performer
2021	Catch Me Out Philippines	Himself / Co-host
2021	Legal Wives	Edgar Delos Reyes
2021	Regal Studio Presents: Karinderya Queens	Dante / Melvin
2022	Return to Paradise	Red Ramos
2024	Makiling	Alexander "Alex" Delos Santos
2024	It's Showtime	Himself / Guest / Performer
2024	Pulang Araw	Marcel
2025	Slay	Zach Zamora
2025	Encantadia Chronicles: Sang'gre	Almiro
2026	Apoy sa Dugo	Marco Panganiban
2026	Barangay Love Stories: Catching Feelings	David
2026	Born to Shine	Kean

=== Theatre ===
Year	Title	Role	Ref.
2019	Rak of Aiges	Tolits	

=== Commercials ===
Year	Brands
2016	BENCH/
2021	BENCH/ Body

== Accolades ==
=== Awards and nominations ===
Award	Year (Note: Indicates the year of ceremony. Each year is linked to the article about the awards held that year, wherever possible.)	Recipient(s) and nominee(s)	Category (Note: Awards in certain categories do not have prior nominations and only winners are announced by the jury. For simplification and to avoid errors, each award in this list has been presumed to have had a prior nomination.)	Result	Ref.
FAMAS Award	2012	Derrick Monasterio	German Moreno Youth Achievement Award	Won	
Golden Screen TV Awards	2011	Reel Love Presents Tween Hearts	Outstanding Breakthrough Performance by an Actor	Nominated	
Golden Screen TV Awards	2012	The Road	Breakthrough Performance by an Actor	Nominated	
PMPC Star Awards for Music	2012	Derrick Monasterio	Best New Male Recording Artist of the Year	Nominated	
PMPC Star Awards for Music	2016	Derrick Monasterio	Best New Male Recording Artist of the Year	Won	
PMPC Star Awards for Television	2011	Reel Love Presents Tween Hearts	Best Male New TV Personality	Won	
