= Rico Robles =

Fil-American DJ and actor

Rico Robles (born July 12) is a disc jockey and a former housemate of Pinoy Big Brother: Celebrity Edition. He has been a disc jockey for Monster Radio RX 93.1, a popular FM station, since 2001-PRESENT. He is also a registered nurse (2004).

He joined a youth oriented show called "BestFrends" in 1998-1999 and was paired up with Aubrey Miles, He has been a disc jockey for Monster Radio RX 93.1, a popular FM station, since 2001–present Then Joined Pinoy Big Brother Celebrity Edition in 2006 the first person from radio to do so. After his eviction, he joined Kapamilya Deal or No Deal, where he won PhP107,000, accepting the deal of the banker. He also played for Game KNB? where he defended his title for three straight days, winning PhP150,000 and an appliance showcase.

He joined Pinoy Mano Mano: Celebrity Boxing Challenge at( ABS-CBN 2007), where he won against Rico Barrera last November 17, 2007. He will be pitted against actor/model Michael Roy Jornales in the semi-finals in which he won. Then Fought against Jordan Herrera in the Grand finals and lost to a very controversial decision. But even without the belt or prize, the people declared him the champion of the said contest. Winning Php 150,000 then he later donated to The Aklat Foundation in the city of Malabon. He also joined another Boxing reality show, Warriors: Celebrity Boxing Challenge on SOLAR TV in 2009. He Was Pitted Against JOEM BASCON and Suffered Another loss due to decision. 2009 He got into Sports Commentating Via UFX (a Grass Roots Mixed Martial Arts show on C/S 9 He moved to GMA 7 via Party Pilipinas which is now a VJ on TV in 2010. He is currently hosting his daily radio show on Monster RX 93.1 / Pro Ring announcer for MMA & BOXING

== TV shows ==
- "Pxc Laban Mma ring announcer"*(present) *"Submission sports league Ring Announcer" (2013–present) *"Pxc for Sports 5 as Fight commentator(2011-2013) *"Fight Sports (AKTV ON IBC, 2011-2013)
- Party Pilipinas (GMA Network, 2010-2013)
- "UFX (Ultimate Fighting Extreme) C/S 9
- Warriors: Celebrity Boxing Challenge (SOLAR TV, 2009)
- Pinoy Mano Mano: Celebrity Boxing Challenge (ABS-CBN 2, 2007)
- Your Song Season 1 Presents: Sabihin Mo Na (ABS-CBN 2, 2007)
- Pinoy Big Brother Celebrity Edition Season 1 (ABS-CBN 2, 2006)
- "Best Frends" (GMA Network, 1998–1999)

== See also ==
- Pinoy Big Brother: Celebrity Edition
- Party Pilipinas
