= Lexi Fernandez =

Filipina actress

- Born: Lexi Fernandez Alvarez; January 5, 1995 (age 31); Manila, Philippines
- Occupations: Actress, singer
- Years active: 2010–2015, 2026–present
- Agent: GMA Artist Center (2010–2015)
- Spouse: Harry Cordingley (m. 2023)
- Parent: Maritoni Fernandez (mother)
- Relatives: Antony Moynihan, 3rd Baron Moynihan (grandfather)

Lexi Fernandez Alvarez-Cordingley (born January 5, 1995) is a Filipino singer and former actress. She is best known for her role as Leslie "Les" Fernan on the 2010 television drama series Reel Love Presents Tween Hearts, as well as for portraying Chloe in the 2011 teen comedy film Tween Academy: Class of 2012.

== Career ==
Fernandez began her acting career under GMA Network, following in the footsteps of her mother, Maritoni, who is of English and Irish descent. Fernandez became a regular presence on several of the network's television programs. In 2010, she played Stephanie Martinez in the television drama fantasy series Ilumina. In September 2010, she played Leslie "Les" Fernan in the drama romance Reel Love Presents Tween Hearts. In 2011, she played Mystica Del Castillo in the drama Nita Negrita and Danielle in the drama fantasy Iglot. In August 2011, Fernandez joined the main cast as Chloe in the teen comedy film Tween Academy: Class of 2012, and in November 2011, she played Janine in the horror anthology The Road. Fernandez originally played the role of Erika in the television sitcom Pepito Manaloto in December 2011; she was eventually replaced by Bea Binene.

In 2012, Fernandez played Queenie Delos Santos in the television drama fantasy series Alice Bungisngis and Her Wonder Walis, Shirley Custoya in the drama comedy romance Together Forever, and Giselle Sarmiento in the drama fantasy Paroa: Ang Kuwento ni Mariposa. In 2013, she played Margarita Domiguez in the drama fantasy Kakambal ni Eliana. In 2014, she appeared as Rose in the drama romance My Destiny, and in 2015, as Clara Salcedo in the romantic comedy Because of You. Fernandez retired from show business in 2015, having suffered from anxiety and depression for two years prior.

== Personal life ==
She is the daughter of Maritoni Fernandez, a Filipina actress. In 2019, she earned a Bachelor of Science degree in Child Development and Education from the University of Asia and the Pacific. On November 19, 2023, she married her partner, Charles Harry Cordingley at the Church of St Cyriac and St Julitta in Newton St Cyres, Devon, England.

== Filmography ==
=== Film ===
| Year | Title | Role |
|---|---|---|
| 2011 | Babang Luksa | Celine |
| 2011 | Tween Academy: Class of 2012 | Chloe |
| 2011 | The Road | Janine |
| 2011 | My House Husband: Ikaw Na! | Mimay |
| 2012 | Just One Summer | Shaina |
| 2012 | Sossy Problems | Stef |
| 2012 | Si Agimat, si Enteng Kabisote at si Ako | Cameo |

=== Television ===
| Year | Title | Role | Notes |
|---|---|---|---|
| 2010–2012 | Reel Love Presents Tween Hearts | Leslie "Les" Fernan | |
| 2010 | Ilumina | Stephanie Martinez | |
| 2011 | Nita Negrita | Mystica "Misty" Del Castillo | |
| 2011 | Time of My Life | Jessica | |
| 2011 | Iglot | Danielle | |
| 2011–2012 | Pepito Manaloto | Erika | |
| 2012 | Alice Bungisngis and her Wonder Walis | Queenie Delos Santos | |
| 2012 | Together Forever | Shirley Custoya | |
| 2012–2013 | Magdalena: Anghel sa Putikan | Fatima "Timay" Natividad | |
| 2012–2013 | Paroa: Ang Kuwento ni Mariposa | Giselle Sarmiento | |
| 2013 | Kakambal ni Eliana | Margarita "Marga" Dominguez | |
| 2013 | Magpakailanman | Shiela May Niangar | Episode: "Flowers of Hope" |
| 2013 | Maynila | Mikkie | Episode: "Playful Hearts" |
| 2014 | My Destiny | Rose | |
| 2015 | Because of You | Clara Salcedo | |

== Awards and nominations ==
| Year | Award-Giving Body | Award / Nomination / Category | Nominated work | Result | Ref. |
|---|---|---|---|---|---|
| 2012 | ENPRESS Golden Screen Awards | Breakthrough Performance by an Actress | The Road | Nominated | |
