= Bubbles Paraiso =

Filipino actress

- Born: Pilar Angela D. Paraiso; July 24, 1984 (age 40); Makati, Philippines
- Occupation: Actress
- Years active: 2007–present
- Agents: GMA Artist Center (2008–2015); Viva Artists Agency (2017–present)

Pilar Angela D. Paraiso, or better known as Bubbles Paraiso (born July 24, 1984), is a Filipino actress and the younger sister of actor Paolo Paraiso. She is currently seen on Kapamilya Channel.

In 2025, Paraiso's social media post differentiating marathons from so-called "fun runs" sparked discussion on the internet.

== Filmography ==
=== Film ===
Year	Title	Role
2008	For the First Time	Issa Villaraza
2009	When I Met U	Vernice
2018	Sid & Aya: Not a Love Story	Dani

=== Television ===
Year	Title	Role
2007	Princess Sarah	Kalela
2008	Codename: Asero	Minnie
2009	Zorro	Magda
2010	The Last Prince	Prinsesa Saraya
2010–2011	Beauty Queen	Stefania Luna
2011	Nita Negrita	Alexandra "Alex" Del Castillo
2011	Captain Barbell	Aswang
2011	Pahiram ng Isang Ina	Eloisa Delos Santos
2012	Legacy	Marie
2012	Kasalanan Bang Ibigin Ka?	Janice
2012–2013	Temptation of Wife	Leslie
2013	Magpakailanman: Sex for Sale - Norman Diwa Versus the Bataan Sex Workers	Precy
2015	Pangako Sa 'Yo	Natalie
2017	Ipaglaban Mo: Hipag	Tina
2021	FPJ's Ang Probinsyano	Lara Vera
2021	Tadhana: Sa Ngalan ng Ama	Anne
2025	Maalaala Mo Kaya	Leon
