= List of Amaya (TV series) characters =

Amaya is a Filipino historical fiction and period drama series created and developed by Suzette Doctolero and directed by Mac Alejandre. Dubbed as the very first epicserye on Philippine television, Marian Rivera takes on the title role as a tribal princess born and destined to change a culture and society dominated by men. With Sid Lucero, Mikael Daez and Aljur Abrenica as her leading men, the story is set in the pre-colonial period of the 1500s.

Here are the complete list of cast and characters from the epic series Amaya aired on GMA Network from May 30, 2011 to January 13, 2012.

== Main characters ==
=== Bai Amaya ===
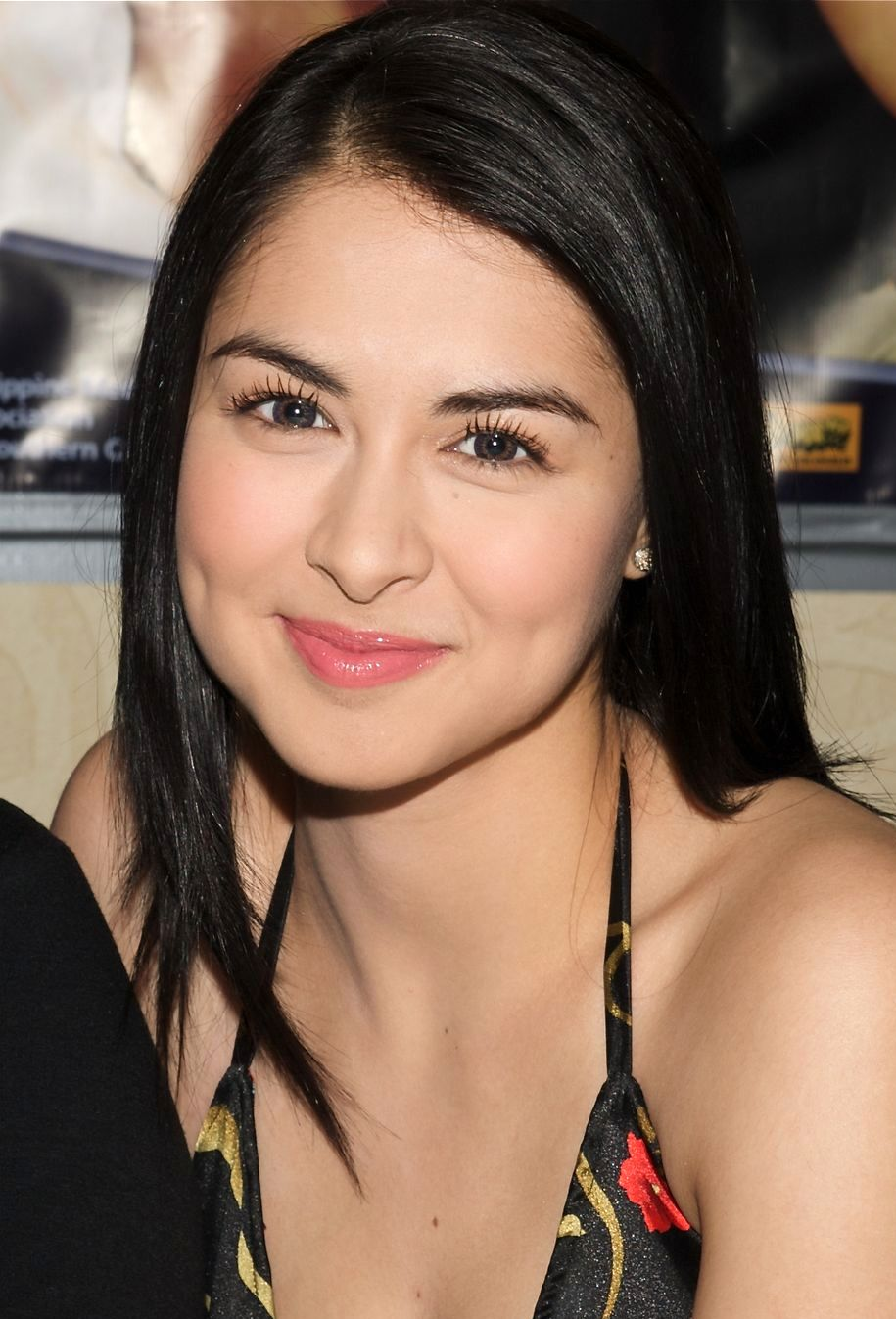
Marian Rivera plays Bai Amaya

Portrayed by Marian Rivera (Edelweiss Tuzon as Young Amaya)

Amaya is the main protagonist of the series. She is the daughter of Datu Bugna and Dal'lang. She is the female warrior in Rajah Mangubat's prophecy with a twin snake who is destined to put an end to his reign of terror. However, in a twist of fate, she and Raja Mangubat's son, Bagani met and falls in love.

From being a Bai (princess), she was turned into an uripon (slave) by Dian Lamitan when her father was killed by Rajah Mangubat due to Lamitan's treachery. She eventually rose among the ranks to become a punong alabay (babaylan's head apprentice) until she was forced to flee after accidentally killing Rajah Mangubat from a self-defense. While in exile, Amaya becomes the baybayin teacher of the tribe Lumad where she meets Dayaw. She then becomes a full-pledged warrior and reunites with Bagani to claim the leadership from Dian Lamitan and at the same time, avenge her father's death. She and Bagani had a child named Bugna.

=== Bagani ===
Portrayed by Sid Lucero (Byron Ortile as Young Bagani; Carlo Lacana as Teen Bagani)

Bagani is the son and successor of Rajah Mangubat. He marries Marikit in order to save Amaya from the hands of Dian Lamitan and Marikit herself. He is later stripped off of his title and becomes an outcast for deceiving his father about his batuk (tattoo of accomplishment). In exile, he became a notorious Datu of the Mangatangs (raiders/pirates).

After Dian Lamitan's death, Bagani is proclaimed as the new Rajah. He offers Amaya to marry him but was turned down the offer due to Amaya choosing to continue to rule her own tribe even though they really love each other. At the end, he transferred his leadership to his brother Banuk to be with Amaya and their child, Bugna.

=== Lumad ===
Portrayed by Mikael Daez

Lumad was the uripon of Atubang. He was Amaya's friend and closest ally, and also was the son of a Datu until their puod was raided by Rajah Mangubat. He had a wife named Bai Libulan, who was carrying their unborn son, but was killed in the raid.

He was killed by Bagani in a fight while aiding Amaya to flee.

=== Dian Lamitan ===
Portrayed by Gina Alajar

Dian Lamitan is the main antagonist of the series. She is the wife of Datu Bugna. She hated Amaya for being Bugna's daughter from an uripon named Dal'lang. Rajah Mangubat later found out that she was the reason why Datu Bugna died, why Marikit succumbed to mental illness, and why Amaya got flayed of her status as a binukot - and so he stripped Lamitan of her status as a Dian. She was sentenced to be an uripon for the rest of her lifetime but regains her status when her ally Angaway becomes the new Rajah of the puod.

She declares herself the new Hara of the puod when Angaway dies. At the end, she is captured by her own daughter Marikit and Abrahm and surrenders her to Bagani and Amaya to face her own execution. She dies after being devoured by a giant sea creature Bakunawa summoned by Amaya. In the afterlife, she is haunted for eternity by the spirits of Bugna, Binayaan, Awi, and Lingayan.

=== Bai Marikit ===
Portrayed by Rochelle Pangilinan (Kate Velarde as Young Marikit)

Bai Marikit is eldest daughter of Datu Bugna and Dian Lamitan. She tries to steal Bagani away from Amaya at all cost and eventually becomes his wife. Soon after Bagani was disowned by Mangubat, her own mother, Dian Lamitan, had her unborn child aborted and their marriage annulled to retain prestige in the puod. Furthermore, Dian Lamitan, to gain higher status in the puod, forced her to marry Rajah Mangubat. Marikit loses her mind after this believing that her unborn child is still in her womb. She comes back to normal when Amaya treated her.

Marikit later marries Abhram to gain a higher status in order to take revenge against her mother, Dian Lamitan

=== Bai Binayaan/Yang Tersayang ===
Portrayed by Glaiza de Castro (Francheska Salcedo as Young Binayaan)

Bai Binayaan is the second daughter of Datu Bugna and Dian Lamitan. Her name, Binayaan comes from the word biya which means left alone/forsaken. Unloved by her parents, she poses as Amaya when Dal'lang found her after Rajah Mangubat invaded their banwa. Feeling guilty in using her sister's name, she changes her name from Binayaan to Yang Tersayang (which means beloved one) to avoid being identified as Datu Bugna's daughter.

She marries Datu Saghid but later betrays her own husband. When Angaway becomes the new Rajah, Dian Lamitan tries to use Binayaan to seduced Rajah Angaway to be her concubine, but she is saved by Bagani by marrying her. She later carries Bagani's child but was poisoned to death after she refuses to let her unborn child out of her womb.

Her death is finally vengeful of her sisters Markit and Amaya to downfall Lamitan.

=== Rajah Mangubat ===
Portrayed by Gardo Versoza (Julian Trono as Young Rajah Mangubat)

Rajah Mangubat is known as a great and undefeated warrior-king but with a reputation of being a ruthless leader. He is the father of Bagani and is married to Hara Lingayan, he then later takes Marikit as his fourth concubine. During his reign, he meets a babaylan (village priestess) who prophesies that a day will come when he will be defeated and be killed by a female warrior with a twin snake.

In the end, he was accidentally killed by Amaya trying to protect herself from his attack.

=== Dayaw ===
Portrayed by Aljur Abrenica

Dayaw is Manobo warrior, who becomes Amaya's new ally and protector when she was put to exile. He is the son of Posaka, the chief of the Manobo tribe. He kills himself to stop Dian Lamitan from using him to capture Amaya in order to kill her.

=== Dal'lang ===
Portrayed by Lani Mercado

Dal'lang is the lover of Datu Bugna and that makes Dian Lamitan despise her so much. They bore a daughter with a twin snake that was later called Amaya. She is a loving and caring mother of Amaya. She takes and treats Bai Binayaan as her own daughter until she finally meets her real daughter, Amaya. She also takes care of Alunsina.

=== Hara Lingayan ===
Portrayed by Ayen Munji-Laurel

Hara Lingayan is the wife of Rajah Mangubat and the mother of Bagani and Banuk. The people love and respect her because of her righteousness and intelligence. She is the mortal enemy of Dian Lamitan and used to be an ally of Amaya. She hated Amaya for killing her husband. After Rajah Mangubat's death, she is forced to accept the marriage proposal of the new Rajah, Angaway, in order to protect her children.

She was secretly murdered on Dian Lamitan's orders. Her death was finally avenged when Amaya success downfall Lamitan.

=== Angaway ===
Portrayed by Ryan Eigenmann (Francis Magundayao as Teen Angaway)

Angaway is the grandson of Uray Hilway and a relative of Rajah Mangubat who has lustful intentions towards Amaya. He orchestrated the revolt that usurped Rajah Mangubat's power to become the next Rajah. He is later killed by Uray Hilway.

== Extended characters ==
=== Datu Bugna ===
Portrayed by Raymond Bagatsing

Datu Bugna is the husband of Dian Lamitan and the father of Marikit and Binayaan. He is also the father of Amaya to Dal'lang, the female warrior on the prophecy who will end the reign of Rajah Mangubat. She loves Amaya more than Markit & Binayaan, due to the having a twin snake & making her as his heir since he cannot bear a son.

He was killed by Rajah Mangubat due to Dian Lamitan's evil desires. His death was finally avenged when Amaya downfall Lamitan.

=== Kapid ===
Portrayed by Diana Zubiri

Kapid is the twin snake of Amaya in human form. She would repeatedly intercede on Amaya's behalf to have her succeed in her tasks. She would even sometimes appear in Amaya's dreams to give her guidance. She is an umalagad.

=== Uray Hilway ===
Portrayed by Angie Ferro

Uray Hilway is the Punong Babaylan (high priestess) of the puod of Rajah Mangubat. She has the ability to communicate with a diwata or an umalagad by letting them possess her body. With Angaway and Atubang, she planned to overthrow Rajah Mangubat by using the girl with the twin snake of the prophecy through the fulfillment of her destiny. She killed her own grandson Rajah Angaway. It is later revealed that in order to protect herself from Dian Lamitan who replaced Angaway as the ruler of the puod, she pretended to be insane using her grandson's death as a medium of her act. She prophesies Dian Lamitan's death. After Amaya and Bagani dethrones Dian Lamitan, she and Amaya became friends, even calling Amaya as her best student.

=== Bai Mantal ===
Portrayed by Irma Adlawan

Bai Mantal is the umbo (older sister) of Dian Lamitan. Knowing that Amaya is the only hope to stop her sister's evilness and to protect her status despite being half-royal and slave, she decided to turn her into a slave after her father's death. She was punished by Dian Lamitan to become an uripon (slave) as a result of turning against her in order to save her niece, Marikit. She fled with Bayang, Kayang and Marikit to the banwa of Hara Lingayan's parents. After Marikit left with her new husband, Mantal went back and tried persuading Dian Lamitan to stop her evil deeds before it was too late, but was imprisoned instead. She escaped as Amaya's army storm the puod. Dian Lamitan, who was captured and was told that Binayaan was killed, begs Mantal for help but refuses, telling Lamitan that even if she repents everything she has done, it is all too late now and that she should have listened to her earlier.

=== Ahak ===
Portrayed by Sheena Halili

Ahak is originally the hayohay of Amaya. She becomes an uripon of Atubang when Amaya was taken. She is freed from being an uripon when Atubang is killed.

=== Awi ===
Portrayed by Roy Alvarez

Awi is Amaya's yoyo or uncle. He treats and protects Amaya like his own daughter when his younger brother Datu Bugna dies from the hands of Rajah Mangubat. He is killed by Paratawag and Songil. He is later seen in sulad (afterlife) as one of the souls to eternally torment Dian Lamitan.

=== Bayang ===
Portrayed by Ana Feleo

Bayang is the former alabay and hayohay of Bagani. She is one of Amaya’s friends. At the end, Amaya asks Uray Hilway to make her an alabay once again.

=== Kayang ===
Portrayed by Roxanne Barcelo

Kayang is the hayohay of DIan Lamitan and Bai Marikit. She also serves Abram when Marikit marries him to gain power.

=== Kuling ===
Portrayed by Dion Ignacio

Kuling is an uripon and the husband of Ahak.

=== Banuk ===
Portrayed by Buboy Villar (Rocco Nacino as Adult Banuk)

Banuk is the younger brother of Bagani. He is the youngest son of Rajah Mangubat and Hara Lingayan. He helps Amaya in stopping Dian Lamitan's evil schemes. He assumed the throne to allow his older brother Bagani to be freed of his responsibilities as Rajah in order finally be with Amaya.

=== Alunsina ===
Portrayed by Abby Bautista (Kris Bernal as Adult Alunsina)

Alunsina is the youngest among the alabays of the puod. She is the first to know about Amaya's secret. During the execution of Dian Lamitan, Alunsina attempts to kill her but Dian Lamitan takes her as a hostage, until she is saved by Amaya.

Years later, she becomes a punong alabay and foresees that there will be new enemies and that there will also be new heroes who will be born to be like Amaya and Bagani in generations to come.

== Recurring characters ==
- Songil - Portrayed by Mon Confiado, a warrior of Rajah Mangubat. He taught Bagani how to fight and becomes Rajah Mangubat's chief minister when Atubang died. He is sided with Amaya in the battle against Angaway and eventually, Lamitan.
- Paratawag - Portrayde by AJ Dee, a warrior of Rajah Mangubat. He is the town crier. He is the one who tells the announcements and proclamations of Rajah Mangubat. He is sided with Amaya in the battle against Angaway and eventually, Lamitan.
- Paragahin - Portrayed by Rob Sy, a warrior of Rajah Mangubat. He is capable of speaking the Malay language. He collects tribute and products for the Rajah Mangubat. A turncoat who sided with Angaway in his rebellion and consequently became his second-in-command. He was killed by Dayaw.
- Agang - Portrayed by Ana Capri, an uripon and best friend of Dal’lang. She is the mother of Pingas. She is the first to believe in the lies of Binayaan. Paragahin kills her by mistake when Angaway ordered him to murder Dal'lang.
- Silay - Portrayed by Mia Pangyarihan, an alabay of Uray Hilway and an ally of Dian Lamitan who is jealous of Amaya. She secretly discovers that Amaya has a twin snake. She was bitten by Kapid (in her snake form) when the former asked her identity and somehow interfered in Amaya's second assault through the puod. She slowly succumbs to Kapid's venom, and died in front of Datu Pulajan, to attest to Kapid's power and might as an umalagad.
- Apila - Portrayed by Yasmien Kurdi, a babaylan who secretly admires Dayaw. She is hostile towards Amaya, but when Amaya saves her, they become close friends.
- Posaka - Portrayed by Ronnie Lazaro, a chief warrior and Dayaw's courageous father. He dislikes Amaya at first but after Apila is saved by Amaya, he accepts her as one of his trusted allies. After Dayaw's death, he proclaims that he can no longer rule the Lumads and was eventually replaced by Amaya which he considers as a daughter.
- Atubang - Portrayed by Daniel Fernando, the second-in-command to Rajah Mangubat and in charge of the armory. He is the father of Angaway and was killed by Amaya when he attempts to kill her.
- Datu Pulajan - Portrayed by Juan Rodrigo, the leader of a tribe who becomes an ally of Dian Lamitan to fight against Amaya. Later he joins forces with Amaya when he found out that Dian Lamitan is trying to kill him. He is poisoned and killed by Dian Lamitan in front of Uray Hilway.
- Banu - Portrayed by Leopoldo Wendell Salgado, one of Bagani's friends.
- Waba - Portrayed by Edgar Manuel, one of Bagani's friends.
- Usbog - Portrayed by Jan Manual, one of Bagani's friends and is killed by Lumad to save Amaya.
- Baylan Asinas - Portrayed by Maybelline dela Cruz, a babaylan who acts as the teacher of the alabays. She becomes the punong babaylan after Uray Hilway. She was killed by Dian Lamitan.
- Pandaki - Portrayed by Tanya Garcia, the diwata who saves the dungan (soul) of Amaya.
- Dian - Portrayed by Deborah Sun, he Dian (queen) mother of Hara Lingayan.
- Magwayen - Portrayed by Aubrey Miles, the diwata who takes dungans to sulad.
- Pingas - Portrayed by Julius Danielle Gareza, the son of Agang.
- Agul - Portrayed by Pancho Magno, an uripon of Atubang and friend of Lumad. He becomes one of Amaya's allies.
- Apong -Portrayed by Chrome Cosio, an uripon of the babaylans. He is the first male to become a babaylan. He is killed by Songil.
- Gadang - Portrayed by Yutaka Yamakawa, Jr., a friend of Silay and one of Hara Lamitan's trusted warriors. He is killed by Amaya.
- Datu Girong - Portrayed by Joel Saracho, the former enemy of the Lumads who Amaya made a peace with. He is later revealed to be the father of Alunsina. He becomes one of Amaya's allies. He is killed by Gadang.
- Datu Saghid - Portrayed by Jordan Herrera, he becomes the husband of Yang Tersayang who betrayed him. He was killed by Bagani.

== Guest characters ==
- Bai Libulan - Portrayed by Sarah Lahbati, the pregnant wife of Lumad. She is killed when Rajah Mangubat raided their banwa.
- Badu - Portrayed by Dindo Arroyo, the uripon ordered by Dian Lamitan to kidnap Amaya. He is later killed by Amaya's twin snake.
- Datu Bulang - Portrayed by Spanky Manikan, the captive saved and freed by Bagani. He becomes the Datu of the Mangatangs and becomes Bagani's mentor. He is betrayed and killed by Mardog whom Bagani killed in turn. He is later succeeded by Bagani as the new Datu of the Mangatangs.
- Uray Digan - Portrayed by Rustica Carpio, the punong babaylan who prophesies about the girl with a twin snake. She is killed by Rajah Mangubat.
- Hiyas - Portrayed by Janina San Miguel, the mother of Rajah Mangubat.
- Datu Usog - Portrayed by Chris Aguilar, Datu of Bayang's and Digan's banwa. He is killed by Rajah Mangubat by just using his index finger.
- Mardog - Portrayed by Archie Adamos, a Mangatang (pirate) who kills his leader Datu Bulang. He is in turn killed by Bagani.
- Taban - Portrayed by Jordan Castillo, a Mangatang who is killed by Songil.
- Ka-ak - Portrayed by Antonette Garcia, the hayohay of Amaya.
- Abrahm - Portrayed by Gerard Pizarras, a noble from Manila and the son of a Lakan who is an ally of Hara Lingayan. He becomes Marikit's husband. Later he sides with Amaya and supports his wife's revenge against Dian Lamitan.
- Fernando Magallanes (Ferdinand Magellan) - Portrayed by Dingdong Dantes, appears in the finale episode of the program, hinting the time when the Spaniards colonizes the land of the Philippines.
