= Andrea Torres =

Filipino actress (born 1990)

- Born: Andrea Elizabeth Eugenio Torres; May 4, 1990 (age 36); Makati, Philippines
- Education: University of Santo Tomas
- Occupation: Actress
- Years active: 2005–present
- Agent: Sparkle GMA Artist Center (2011–present)
- Height: 1.63 m (5 ft 4 in)

Andrea Elizabeth Eugenio Torres (born May 4, 1990) is a Filipino actress. She is currently an exclusive contract artist of GMA Network. Her acting breakthrough came in the 2012 television series Sana ay Ikaw na Nga. Since then, she starred in various TV series such as Ang Lihim ni Annasandra (2014), The Millionaire's Wife (2016), Alyas Robin Hood (2016), The Better Woman (2019), Legal Wives (2021), and Akusada (2025).

== Early life and education ==
Torres was born on May 4, 1990, in Makati City, Philippines, to Oscar Torres, a college professor, and Emerita Torres, who manages a food business. She has four siblings: Timothy, Kevin, Angeli, and Kenneth.

Torres completed her elementary education at St. Scholastica's College in Manila. She began her high school studies at Colegio San Agustin but transitioned to homeschooling after entering the entertainment industry.

After high school, Torres enrolled at the University of Santo Tomas to study Communication Arts. However, she decided to pause her education after two years to focus on her career in show business. In a 2020 interview, she shared her intention to complete a college degree in the future, although she expressed a preference for pursuing a different field, such as marketing or business.

== Career ==
Torres was first seen as one of the contestants in ABS-CBN's teen-oriented reality show Qpids in 2005. In 2008, Torres transferred to GMA Network and became one of the hosts of the now-defunct youth-oriented magazine show, Ka-Blog!. She played supporting roles in various movies such as You to Me Are Everything and Shake, Rattle & Roll X.

On March 8, 2011, Torres signed a three-year exclusive contract with GMA Network. Two months later, she was part of the cast of the afternoon drama series Blusang Itim. She played a supporting role in the 2012 primetime series My Beloved.

Soon after, Torres landed her first lead role in the 2012 afternoon drama series Sana ay Ikaw na Nga, a remake of the 2001 popular teledrama of the same name where she was paired with Mikael Daez.

In 2013, Torres and Daez reunited in the romantic comedy series With a Smile. They continued their onscreen partnership in the 2014 fantasy-romance drama Ang Lihim ni Annasandra where she played the titular character. She led the cast of the 2016 afternoon drama series The Millionaire's Wife. Shortly after, Torres starred alongside Dingdong Dantes and Megan Young in the action-drama television series Alyas Robin Hood.

After primarily starring in the network's Afternoon Prime block, she went on to headline various primetime television series after Alyas Robin Hood, including The Better Woman, I Can See You: The Promise, and Legal Wives. She was also a mainstay of the weekly comedy show Bubble Gang from 2013 to 2019.

In 2022, Torres was widely praised for her portrayal of Sisa in historical fantasy series Maria Clara at Ibarra.

== Other media ==
Torres appeared on the cover of FHM Philippines' December 2014 issue. She was also voted No.2 in the men's magazine's 100 Sexiest Women in the World in 2015 and No.15 in 2016. In 2015, she published her coffee table photo-book titled Andrea: Roadtrip.

Torres was launched as the 2017 calendar girl of the beverage company Asia Brewery. The following year, she was again featured as a calendar girl for the company, this time for their Cobra Energy Drink brand. After years as a calendar girl, she went on to publish her own personal calendar for 2019. In an Instagram post, Torres explained that this was her way of expressing her gratitude for the support fans had given her over the years.

== Personal life ==
Torres previously dated actor Derek Ramsay in 2019. They starred together in the television series The Better Woman. The couple confirmed their breakup in November 2020.

== Filmography ==
=== Television ===
Year	Title	Role
2005	Qpids	Herself
2006	Maalaala Mo Kaya: Barya	
2006–2007	Teka Mona!	Herself
2008–2010	Ka-Blog!	Herself/host
2010	APT Entertainment Lenten Special: Anghel sa Lupa	Luisa
2011	APT Entertainment Lenten Special: Maestra	Belle
2011	Blusang Itim	Alison Escote
2011	Spooky Nights: The Mommy Returns	Karen
2011	Kung Aagawin Mo ang Langit	Elise
2011	Spooky Nights: Sanggol	Nimfa
2012	My Beloved	Dessa
2012	Spooky Nights: Premonisyon	Joan
2012	Spooky Nights: Korona	Sally
2012–2013	Sana ay Ikaw na Nga	Cecilia Fulgencio-Altamonte / Margarita Trajano / Olga Villavicer-Altamonte
2013	With a Smile	Isabella "Isay" Asuncion
2013	Magpakailanman: Transman: The Nil Nodalo Story	Marie
2013	Wagas: Tom & Jeza Love Story	Jeza Clemente
2013–2019	Bubble Gang	Herself (Mainstay)
2014–2015	Ang Lihim ni Annasandra	Annasandra "Anna" Vergara
2014	Magpakailanman: Persia: Asong Kanal	DJ
2014	Wagas: Vince & Patricia Love Story	Patricia Bermudez
2015	Pari 'Koy	Lilac Romero / Cristina Evangelista
2015	My Faithful Husband	Samantha "Sam" Fuentebella-Montenegro
2015	Karelasyon: Laro	Michelle
2015	Wagas: Forget-Me-Not on Christmas	Faith
2015	Magpakailanman: Ang Asawa Kong Aswang	Gloria
2016	APT Entertainment Lenten Special: Dalangin ng Ama	Aila Abquilan
2016	A'1 Ko Sa'Yo: Challenge Accepted	Dea
2016	The Millionaire's Wife	Louisa Ignacio-Vergara / Louisa Ignacio-Meneses
2016	Dear Uge: Aswang (daw) ang Asawa ko	Barbara
2016	Magpakailanman: When Love Becomes Obsession	Rhoda
2016–2017	Alyas Robin Hood	Venus Torralba-de Jesus / Clara
2017	D' Originals	Gina
2017	Dear Uge: Kabit-bisig	Virginia
2017	Hay, Bahay!: Bikini in Tandem	Eba
2017	Stories for the Soul: Hanggang Saan, Hanggang Kailan?	Linda
2017	Dear Uge: Kuwentong Kutsero	Iska
2018	Dear Uge: Si Throwback O Si Future?	Honey
2018	Victor Magtanggol	Sif
2018	Daig Kayo Ng Lola Ko: Katy Fairy	Katy Fairy
2018	Contessa	Contessa Venganza
2018	Dear Uge: Kabit-sabit	Ning
2019	The Better Woman	Jasmine Santos-de Villa / Juliet Santos / Elaine Reyes / Chloe dela Cruz
2019	Dear Uge: Ang Babaeng Walang Closure	Chloe
2020	I Can See You: The Promise	Ivy Teodoro
2020	Daddy's Gurl	Megan
2020	Magpakailanman: My Gangster Lover: The Aira Arcamo and Ador Gabrieles Love Story	Aira Arcamo
2020	Magpakailanman: Mister, Bugbog Kay Misis	Arlene
2021	Dear Uge: Labing-isang Daliri	Pining
2021	Legal Wives	Dra. Diane May San Luis
2021	BetCin	Cindy Rodriguez
2022–2023	Maria Clara at Ibarra	Sisa
2022	Happy Together	Emily
2022	One Good Day	Alex Sandoval
2023	Love Before Sunrise	Czarina Montelibano-Menandrez
2023–present	It's Showtime	Herself (Guest)
2023–2024	Bubble Gang	Herself (Guest)
2024	Magpakailanman: Kung Mawawala Ka	Maribeth
2025	Akusada	Carolina "Carol" Astor / Lorena Herrera
2025	Encantadia Chronicles: Sang'gre	Ayeshka
2025–2026	Sanggang-Dikit FR	Liberty

=== Film ===
Year	Title	Role
2007	Shake, Rattle & Roll 9	Schoolgirl
2008	Manay Po 2: Overload	Ida
2008	Loving You	Kim
2008	Shake, Rattle & Roll X	Alyssa
2010	You to Me Are Everything	Therese Fernandez
2015	Blood in Dispute	Angela
2017	Meant to Beh	Agatha Bayona
2023	Destino Pasional	Mahalia

== Accolades and Recognitions ==
- 7th GEMS Awards 2023: Best Performance by an Actress in a Supporting Role (TV Series) - Maria Clara at Ibarra
- 2023 Platinum Stallion National Media Awards: Best Actress in a Supporting Role - Maria Clara at Ibarra
- 12th NwSSU Students' Choice Awards for Radio and Television (2023): Best Supporting Actress in a Primetime Teleserye - Maria Clara at Ibarra
