= Barbara Miguel =

Filipino actress (born 2004)

- Born: Renerich Marl Ocon Jovenier; July 14, 2004 (age 22); Quezon City, Philippines
- Occupation: Actress
- Years active: 2011–present
- Agents: GMA Artist Center (2011–2023); Marikit Artist Management (2023–present)

Renerich Marl Ocon Jovenier (Tagalog: [[ˈɾɛnɛɾitʃ maɾl ˈokɔn hoˈvɛnɪɐɾ]]; born July 14, 2004), known professionally as Barbara Miguel, is a Filipino actress. She began her career as a child actress and is best known for her role in the 2013 Cinemalaya independent film Nuwebe and the GMA Network television drama Munting Heredera (2011–2012).

Her accolades include a FAMAS Award, a Best Actress award at the Harlem International Film Festival, and recognition from the ASEAN International Film Festival and Awards, among others.

== Filmography ==
Key
†	Denotes films that have not yet been released

=== Film ===
Year	Title	Role	Notes	Ref.
2012	Migrante		Won—FAMAS Award for Best Child Actress	
2013	Nuwebe	Krista	Won—Harlem International Film Festival Award for Best Actress	
2013	Burgos		Support Role	
2013	Bamboo Flowers	Myra	Support Role	
2015	Flotsam	Marie	Support Role	
2016	Gasping for Air (1-2-3)	Lulu	Won—ASEAN International Film Festival and Awards for Best Supporting Actress	
2016	Hinabing Pakpak ng Ating mga Anak		Entry for the QCinema International Film Festival	
2017	Instalado	Shamila	Won—2nd ToFarm Film Festival for Best Supporting Actress	
2019	Kublihan: Crizalyn Macato Story	Crizalyn Macato	Part of CBN Asia's 2019 Tanikala Series	
2021	Eva	Nanny		
2021	Huwag Kang Lalabas	Young Martha	Segment: Kumbento	
2022	Walker	Jona		
2023	Kampihan	Jen-Jen	Television Movie	
2024	A Lab Story	Lovely	1st Puregold Cinepanalo Film Fesitcal entry	
2024	Guardia de Honor	Young Minda	Entry for the 46th Moscow International Film Festival	
2025	Paglilitis	Jasmine	Entry for the 21st Cinemalaya Independent Film Festival	
2025	Sisa	Rita	29th Tallinn Black Nights Film Festival entry	

=== Television ===
Year	Title	Role	Notes	Ref.
2011	Spooky Nights: Ang Munting Mahadera	Jenjen / Bembem	Season 1, Episodes 22-23	
2011-2012	Munting Heredera	Calilla S. Aroboleda	Main Role	
2012	Biritera	Darling	Support Role	
2012	Aso ni San Roque	Didi		
2013	Magpakailanman	Cutie Pie Carlyn	Episode: "My Beautiful Daughter: The Maxino Family Lifestory"	
2013	Magpakailanman	Netnet	Episode: "Hinagpis ng Isang Ina: The Rape of an Autistic Child Story"	
2013	Genesis	Margarita "Margot" Caruhatan-Barrinuevo	Episode: "In The Midst of Destruction"	
2013	Pepito Manaloto: Ang Tunay na Kuwento	Angel		
2014	Carmela	Linggit Mener	Support Role	
2014	Sa Puso ni Dok	Angela	Episode: "The Mission"	
2014	Niño	Calay	Guest Role	
2014	Ang Lihim ni Annasandra	Annicka "Nikay" Sanchez	Guest Role	
2014	Imbestigador		Episode: "Bad si Sir"	
2015	Magpakailanman	Young Norma	Episode: "Ama Namin: The Jesus Boy Paringao Story"	
2015	Magpakailanman	Erielle Cerbito	Episode: "Sa Ngalan ng Anak: The Cerbito Family Story"	
2015	Magpakailanman	Carla	Episode: "Ang Huling Yakap sa Nawalang Anak"	
2015	Magpakailanman	Jennifer	Episode: "Isang Mister, Lima ang Misis"	
2015	Pari 'Koy	Daniella Salameda		
2015	Wish Ko Lang!		Episode: "Libing"	
2015	MariMar	Young Amale		
2015	Imbestigador	Joan Santo	Episode: "Davao City Massacre"	
2016	Imbestigador		Episode: "Rasha Mae"	
2016	Magpakailanman	Young Rosie	Episode: "The Rape of Rosie"	
2016-2017	Encantadia	Young Pirena		
2017	Destined to be Yours	Young Catalina		
2017	Wagas		Episode: "Sumpa"	
2017	Super Ma'am	Young Jessica	Uncredited	
2017	Magpakailanman	Daniela	Episode: "Viral Siblings: The Bilog and Bunak Tiongson Story"	
2017	Magpakailanman	Young Jinky	Episode: "Beauty in Your Eyes: The Jinky 'Madam Kilay' Anderson Story"	
2017	Tadhana	Bebang	Episode: "143 NZ"	
2017	Wish Ko Lang!		Episode: "Asset"	
2018	Sirkus	Young Lara	Episodes 7 & 13	
2018	Wagas	Julia	Episode: "Ngayon Lang"	
2018	Daig Kayo ng Lola Ko	Sneezy	Episode: "Snow White and the Seven Dwarfs"	
2018	Magpakailanman	Melanie	Episode: "Pasan Ko Ang Aking Ina: The Honeylyn and Melanie Ledesma Story"	
2018-2019	My Special Tatay	Cindy Flores	Recurring Role	
2019	The Better Woman	Young Jasmine/ Juliet / Elaine	Credited for Young Elaine Reyes	
2019	Tadhana	Young Myrna	Episodes: "Yaya CEO" (two-part)	
2020	Imbestigador	Camille		
2020	Wish Ko Lang!	Precious	Episode: "Babaeng may sakit sa pag-iisip, minamaltrato ng mga umampon sa kanya!"	
2020	Wish Ko Lang!	Jevi	Episode: "Kutob	
2020	Wish Ko Lang!	Jaja	Episode: "Nilapa ng Buwaya"	
2021	Imbestigador	Lovely	Episode: "Ang Kalansay sa Guimaras"	
2021-2022	Pepito Manaloto: Ang Unang Kuwento	Barbara Agustin	Recurring Role	
2022	Wish Ko Lang!	Bea	Episode: "Ang Pangarap ni Lola"	
2022	Imbestigador	Crizzel Gwynn Maguad	Episode: "Maguad Siblings Double Murder Case"	
2022	Regal Studio Presents	Charm	Episode: "My Cheesy Cutie Guy"	
2022	Tadhana	Klea	Episodes 210-211	
2022-2023	Nakarehas na Puso	Young Lea		
2023	Wish Ko Lang!	Grace	Episodes: "Paratang" (two-part)	
2024	Black Rider	April	Uncredited	

== Accolades ==
=== Film awards ===
Awards and NominationsAwards and nominations received by Barbara Miguel
Award	Year	Category	Nominated work	Result	Ref.
ASEAN International Film Festival and Awards	2015	Best Actress	Nuwebe	Nominated	
ASEAN International Film Festival and Awards	2019	Best Supporting Actress	Gasping for Air	Won	
FAMAS Award	2013	Best Child Actress	Migrante	Won	
Harlem International Film Festival	2013	Best Actress	Nuwebe	Won	
Northern Virginia International Film and Music Festival	2018	Best Actress - Feature Film	Gasping for Air	Nominated	
Queens World Film Festival	2014	Best Actress - Narrative Feature	Nuwebe	Nominated	
ToFarm Film Festival	2017	Best Supporting Actress	Instalado	Won	

=== Honors and state recognition ===
Organization	Year	Award/Honor	Recipient	Result	Ref.
Film Development Council of the Philippines	2020	—N/a	Gasping for Air (Note: The honor was awarded to Miguel for receiving the Best Supporting Actress award at the 4th ASEAN International Film Festival and Awards.)	Honored	
Inquirer Indie Bravo!	2013	—		Honored	
Inquirer Indie Bravo!	2019	Award of Distinction	—N/a	Honored	
National Commission for Culture and the Arts	2014	Ani ng Dangal – Cinema	—N/a	Honored	
National Commission for Culture and the Arts	2020	Ani ng Dangal – Cinema	—N/a	Honored	
