= Sana ay Ikaw na Nga =

Sana ay Ikaw na Nga may refer to:

- Sana ay Ikaw na Nga (2001 TV series), a Philippine telenovela aired on GMA Network, starring Dingdong Dantes and Tanya Garcia
- Sana ay Ikaw na Nga (2012 TV series), a Philippine telenovela aired on GMA Network, starring Mikael Daez and Andrea Torres
