= The Better Woman (TV series) =

2019 Philippine television drama series

- Title card
- Genre: Drama
- Created by: Angeli Delgado
- Written by: Angeli Delgado; Ana Aleta Nadela; Loi Argel Nova; Erwin Bravo
- Directed by: Mark Sicat dela Cruz
- Creative director: Aloy Adlawan
- Starring: Andrea Torres
- Theme music composer: Rina May L. Mercado
- Opening theme: "Bakit Siya?" by Aicelle Santos and Maricris Garcia
- Country of origin: Philippines
- Original language: Tagalog
- No. of episodes: 65 (list of episodes)

Production
- Executive producer: Darling Pulido-Torres
- Production locations: La Union, Philippines
- Cinematography: Apol Anao
- Editors: Noel Stamatelaky Mauricio III; Robert Ryan Reyes
- Camera setup: Multiple-camera setup
- Running time: 24–40 minutes
- Production company: GMA Entertainment Group

Original release
- Network: GMA Network
- Release: July 1 – September 27, 2019

The Better Woman is a 2019 Philippine television drama series broadcast by GMA Network. Directed by Mark Sicat dela Cruz, it stars Andrea Torres in the title role, it premiered on July 1, 2019 on the network's Telebabad line up. The series concluded on September 27, 2019, with a total of 65 episodes.

The series is streaming online on YouTube.

== Premise ==
Married couple Jasmine de Villa and Andrew de Villa live in La Union where they own a surf resort. When Andrew heads to Manila for a business meeting, he will encounter Jasmine's lost twin sister, Juliet Santos, whom will eventually reconcile with her estranged biological family, live with her sister and have a love affair with him.

== Cast and characters ==
Cast

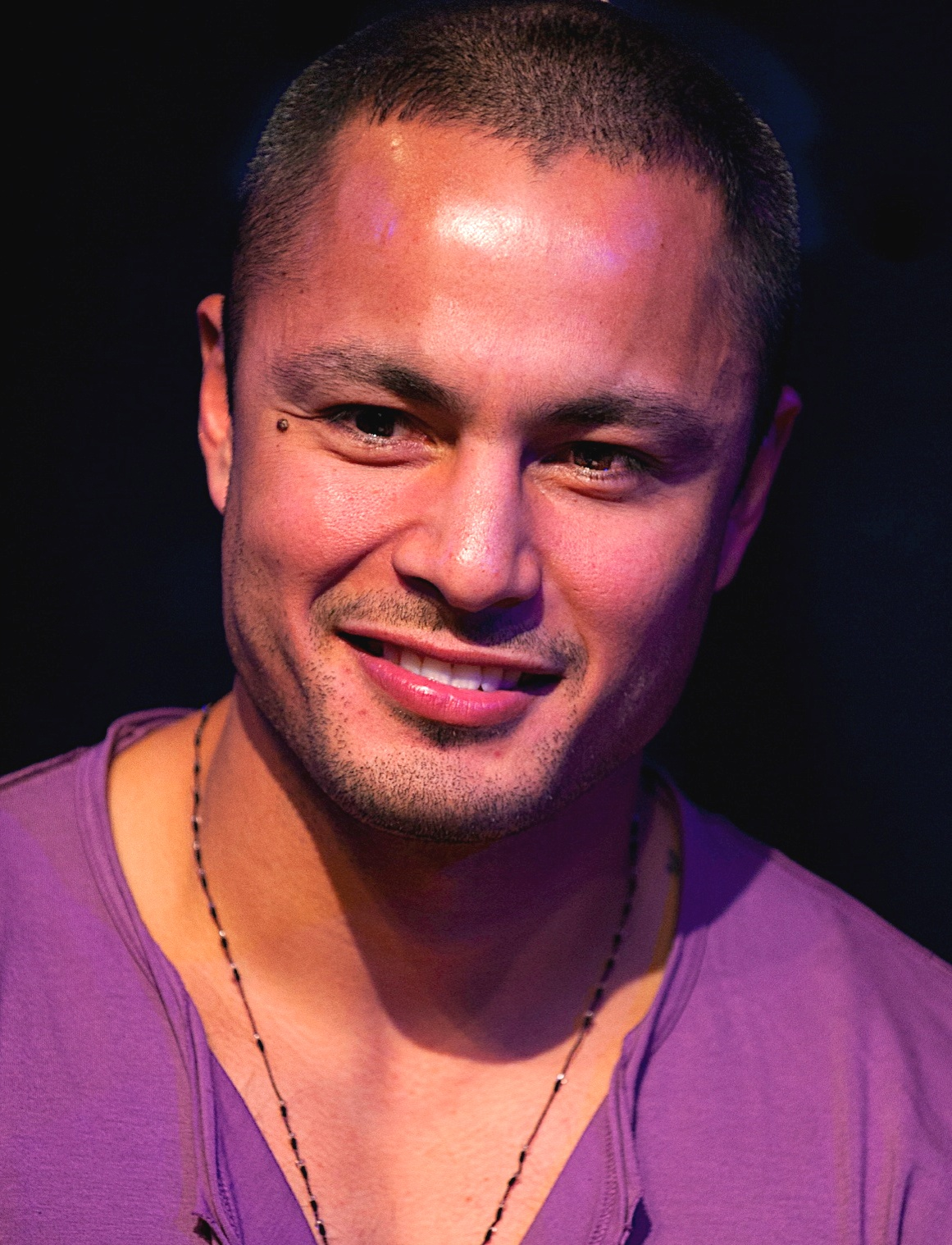
Derek Ramsay

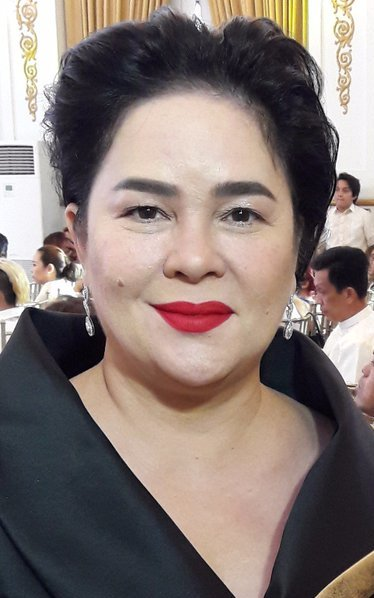
Jaclyn Jose

Lead cast

- Andrea Torres as Jasmine Santos-de Villa / Juliet Santos / Elaine Reyes / Chloe dela Cruz

Supporting cast

- Derek Ramsay as Andrew de Villa
- Jaclyn Jose as Erlinda Santos
- Ina Feleo as Angela de Villa-Castro
- Marco Alcaraz as Glenn Santiago
- Ashley Rivera as Chesi Rodriguez
- Paolo Paraiso as Joross Baltazar
- Frances Makil-Ignacio as Amy Santos
- Jenzel Ho as Ella
- Joemarie Nielsen as Greg
- Erlinda Villalobos as Luring
- Tommy Abuel as Ronaldo Laserna
- Maureen Larrazabal as Ruby
- Jay Arcilla as Michael San Luis
- Yuan Francisco as Kawaii de Villa Castro
- Bryce Eusebio as Kyrie de Villa Castro
- Ana de Leon as Nancy
- Mike Lloren as Roman Reyes
- Cheska Diaz as Edith Reyes
- Marx Topacio as Jong
- Prince Clemente as Basti
- Renz Fernandez as Paolo
- Lindsay de Vera as Ashley

Guest cast

- Barbara Miguel as younger Jasmine and Juliet / Elaine
- Empress Schuck as younger Erlinda
- Wilma Doesnt as Raissa Pagurigan-Santos
- Ervic Vijandre as Rafael "Paeng" Amante
- Mela Franco Habijan

== Production ==
Principal photography commenced in May 2019. Filming concluded in September 2019.

== Ratings ==
According to AGB Nielsen Philippines' Nationwide Urban Television Audience Measurement People in television homes, the final episode of The Better Woman scored a 10.4% rating.

== Accolades ==
Accolades received by The Better Woman
| Year | Award | Category | Recipient | Result | Ref. |
|---|---|---|---|---|---|
| 2019 | 9th OFW Gawad Parangal | Best Actor | Derek Ramsay | Won | |
| 2019 | 9th OFW Gawad Parangal | Best Actress | Andrea Torres | Won | |
| 2021 | 34th PMPC Star Awards for Television | Best Child Performer | Yuan Francisco | Nominated | |
