= List of The Better Woman episodes =

The Better Woman is a 2019 Philippine drama television series broadcast by GMA Network. It premiered on the network's Telebabad line up and worldwide on GMA Pinoy TV on July 1 to September 27, 2019 replacing, Kara Mia in Sahaya's timeslot.

Originally it was supposed to replace Kara Mia in its timeslot, but due to its mature theme, it was bumped off to the 2nd slot, moving Sahaya to the 1st slot.

== Series overview ==
| Month | Episodes | Monthly averages |
| Month | Episodes | NUTAM |
|---|---|---|
| July 2019 | 23 | 8.0% |
| August 2019 | 22 | 7.9% |
| September 2019 | 20 | 8.8% |
| Total | 65 | 8.2% |

== Episodes ==
=== July 2019 ===
| Episode | | Original air date | Social media hashtag | AGB Nielsen NUTAM People in Television Homes | | ProdCode | Ref. |
| Episode | | Original air date | Social media hashtag | Rating | Timeslot rank | ProdCode | Ref. |
|---|---|---|---|---|---|---|---|
| 1 | "Pilot" | July 1, 2019 | #TheBetterWoman | 9.8% | #2 | 101 - A | |
| 2 | "Juliet" | July 2, 2019 | #TBWJuliet | 10.1% | #2 | 102 - B | |
| 3 | "Andrew's Choice" | July 3, 2019 | #TBWAndrewsChoice | 9.8% | #2 | 103 - C | |
| 4 | "Rejection and Loyalty" | July 4, 2019 | #TBWRejectionAndLoyalty | 9.0% | #2 | 104 - D | |
| 5 | "Face to Face" | July 5, 2019 | #TBWFaceToFace | 8.7% | #2 | 105 - E | |
| 6 | "Revelations" | July 8, 2019 | #TBWRevelations | 8.9% | #2 | 106 - F | |
| 7 | "Reunited" | July 9, 2019 | #TBWReunited | 9.0% | #2 | 107 - G | |
| 8 | "Elaine's Past" | July 10, 2019 | #TBWElainesPast | 9.0% | #2 | 108 - H | |
| 9 | "Life of Juliet" | July 11, 2019 | #TBWLifeOfJuliet | 9.1% | #2 | 109 - I | |
| 10 | "Meet Up" | July 12, 2019 | #TBWMeetUp | 7.2% | #2 | 110 - J | |
| 11 | "Inggit" (transl. Envy) | July 15, 2019 | #TBWInggit | 8.1% | #2 | 111 - K | |
| 12 | "What Juliet Wants" | July 16, 2019 | #TBWWhatJulietWants | 6.1% | #2 | 112 - L | |
| 13 | "Selos" (transl. Jealous) | July 17, 2019 | #TBWSelos | 6.9% | #2 | 113 - M | |
| 14 | "Juliet and Andrew" | July 18, 2019 | #TBWJulietAndrew | 7.0% | #2 | 114 - N | |
| 15 | "Sa'kin Ka na Lang"' (transl. You're Just Mine Now) | July 19, 2019 | #TBWSakinKaNaLang | 7.2% | #2 | 115 - O | |
| 16 | "Juliet Flirts with Andrew" | July 22, 2019 | #TBWJulietFlirtsWithAndrew | 6.4% | #2 | 116 - P | |
| 17 | "Broken Hearted" | July 23, 2019 | #TBWBrokenHearted | 6.7% | #2 | 118 - R | |
| 18 | "Game Plan" | July 24, 2019 | #TBWGamePlan | 6.4% | #2 | 117 - Q | |
| 19 | "Pakiramdam" (transl. Feeling) | July 25, 2019 | #TBWPakiramdam | 7.9% | #2 | 119 - S | |
| 20 | "Andrew's Trap" | July 26, 2019 | #TBWAndrewsTrap | 8.1% | #2 | 120 - T | |
| 21 | "The Kiss" | July 29, 2019 | #TBWTheKiss | 8.0% | #2 | 121 - U | |
| 22 | "Awayan" (transl. Fight) | July 30, 2019 | #TBWAwayan | 7.6% | #2 | 122 - V | |
| 23 | "Deception" | July 31, 2019 | #TBWDeception | 7.9% | #2 | 123 - W | |

=== August 2019 ===
| Episode | | Original air date | Social media hashtag | AGB Nielsen NUTAM People in Television Homes | | ProdCode | Ref. |
| Episode | | Original air date | Social media hashtag | Rating | Timeslot rank | ProdCode | Ref. |
|---|---|---|---|---|---|---|---|
| 24 | "Reality" | August 1, 2019 | #TBWReality | 8.2% | #2 | 124 - X | |
| 25 | "Guilty" | August 2, 2019 | #TBWGuilty | 7.7% | #2 | 125 - Y | |
| 26 | "Panlalamig" (transl. Cooling) | August 5, 2019 | #TBWPanlalamig | 7.9% | #2 | 126 - Z | |
| 27 | "Surprise Gift" | August 6, 2019 | #TBWSurpriseGift | 7.0% | #2 | 128 - BB | |
| 28 | "Threat" | August 7, 2019 | #TBWThreat | 7.6% | #2 | 127 - AA | |
| 29 | "Proof" | August 8, 2019 | #TBWProof | 7.8% | #2 | 129 - CC | |
| 30 | "The Confession" | August 9, 2019 | #TBWTheConfession | 7.5% | #2 | 130 - DD | |
| 31 | "Sumbatan" (transl. Blockage) | August 12, 2019 | #TBWSumbatan | 8.2% | #2 | 131 - EE | |
| 32 | "Pagbabalik" (transl. Comeback) | August 13, 2019 | #TBWPagbabalik | 8.0% | #2 | 132 - FF | |
| 33 | "Confession" | August 14, 2019 | #TBWConfession | 8.1% | #2 | 133 - GG | |
| 34 | "Buntis" (transl. Pregnant) | August 15, 2019 | #TBWBuntis | 8.1% | #2 | 134 - HH | |
| 35 | "Confirmation" | August 16, 2019 | #TBWConfirmation | 8.0% | #2 | 135 - II | |
| 36 | "Pagbubuntis" (transl. Pregnancy) | August 19, 2019 | #TBWPagbubuntis | 7.7% | #2 | 136 - JJ | |
| 37 | "Surprise" | August 20, 2019 | #TBWSurprise | 8.0% | #2 | 137 - KK | |
| 38 | "Betrayal" | August 21, 2019 | #TBWBetrayal | 7.8% | #2 | 139 - MM | |
| 39 | "Pasabog" (transl. Explosion) | August 22, 2019 | #TBWPasabog | 7.8% | #2 | 138 - LL | |
| 40 | "Cornered" | August 23, 2019 | #TBWCornered | 8.3% | #2 | 140 - NN | |
| 41 | "Jasmine Fights Back" | August 26, 2019 | #TBWJasmineFightsBack | 8.5% | #2 | 141 - OO | |
| 42 | "Cutting Ties" | August 27, 2019 | #TBWCuttingTies | 7.3% | #2 | 142 - PP | |
| 43 | "Miscarriage" | August 28, 2019 | #TBWMiscarriage | 8.0% | #2 | 143 - QQ | |
| 44 | "Obsession" | August 29, 2019 | #TBWObsession | 7.7% | #2 | 144 - RR | |
| 45 | "The Switch" | August 30, 2019 | #TBWTheSwitch | 8.0% | #2 | 145 - SS | |

=== September 2019 ===
| Episode | | Original air date | Social media hashtag | AGB Nielsen NUTAM People in Television Homes | | ProdCode | Ref. |
| Episode | | Original air date | Social media hashtag | Rating | Timeslot rank | ProdCode | Ref. |
|---|---|---|---|---|---|---|---|
| 46 | "Bad Dream" | September 2, 2019 | #TBWBadDream | 7.7% | #2 | 146 - TT | |
| 47 | "Postpartum" | September 3, 2019 | #TBWPostpartum | 8.0% | #2 | 147 - UU | |
| 48 | "The Escape" | September 4, 2019 | #TBWTheEscape | 7.7% | #2 | 148 - VV | |
| 49 | "The Plan" | September 5, 2019 | #TBWThePlan | 8.6% | #2 | 149 - WW | |
| 50 | "Cover Up" | September 6, 2019 | #TBWCoverUp | 9.3% | #2 | 151 - YY | |
| 51 | "Ang Pagbabalik" (transl. The Return) | September 9, 2019 | #TBWAngPagbabalik | 7.6% | #2 | 150 - XX | |
| 52 | "Hinala" (transl. Suspicion) | September 10, 2019 | #TBWHinala | 8.3% | #2 | 152 - ZZ | |
| 53 | "Confrontations" | September 11, 2019 | #TBWConfrontations | 7.9% | #2 | 153 - AAA | |
| 54 | "The Killer" | September 12, 2019 | #TBWTheKiller | 7.7% | #2 | 154 - BBB | |
| 55 | "Harapan" (transl. Facade) | September 13, 2019 | #TBWHarapan | 8.7% | #2 | 155 - CCC | |
| 56 | "Bistado" (transl. Caught) | September 16, 2019 | #TBWBistado | 8.3% | #2 | 156 - DDD | |
| 57 | "The Death" | September 17, 2019 | #TBWTheDeath | 8.8% | #2 | 157 - EEE | |
| 58 | "Pagpapanggap" (transl. Pretending) | September 18, 2019 | #TBWPagpapanggap | 8.9% | #2 | 158 - FFF | |
| 59 | "The Escape" | September 19, 2019 | #TBWTheEscape | 9.6% | #2 | 159 - GGG | |
| 60 | "Ganti" (transl. Revenge) | September 20, 2019 | #TBWGanti | 9.6% | #2 | 160 - HHH | |
| 61 | "Exposed" | September 23, 2019 | #TBWExposed | 9.8% | #2 | 161 - III | |
| 62 | "Konsiyensya" (transl. Consicence) | September 24, 2019 | #TBWKonsiyensya | 9.8% | #1 | 162 - JJJ | |
| 63 | "Distraction" | September 25, 2019 | #TBWDistraction | 9.9% | #2 | 163 - KKK | |
| 64 | "Trapped" | September 26, 2019 | #TBWTrapped | 9.7% | #1 | 164 - LLL | |
| 65 | "Finale" | September 27, 2019 | #TheBetterWomanFinale | 10.4% | #1 | 165 - MMM | |
