= Ang Lihim ni Annasandra =

Philippine television drama series

- Title card
- Also known as: The Secret of Annasandra
- Genre: Fantasy drama
- Created by: Richard "Dode" Cruz; Wiro Michael Ladera
- Written by: Luningning Ribay; Christine Novicio; Richard Cruz
- Directed by: Albert Langitan
- Creative director: Jun Lana
- Starring: Andrea Torres
- Theme music composer: Janno Gibbs; Peach Abubacar
- Opening theme: "Lihim" by Maricris Garcia
- Country of origin: Philippines
- Original language: Tagalog
- No. of episodes: 88 (list of episodes)

Production
- Executive producer: Darling Pulido-Torres
- Producer: Mavic Tagbo
- Production locations: Manila, Philippines
- Editors: Vincent Valenzuela; Julius Castillo; Nikka Olayvar
- Camera setup: Multiple-camera setup
- Running time: 17–27 minutes
- Production company: GMA Entertainment TV

Original release
- Network: GMA Network
- Release: October 6, 2014 – February 6, 2015

Ang Lihim ni Annasandra (trans. / international title: The Secret of Annasandra) is a Philippine television drama fantasy series broadcast by GMA Network. Directed by Albert Langitan, it stars Andrea Torres in the title role. It premiered on October 6, 2014 on the network's Afternoon Prime line up. The series concluded on February 6, 2015, with a total of 88 episodes.

The series is streaming online on YouTube.

== Premise ==
Annasandra is the daughter of Belinda and Carlos. Events will lead to Annasandra to be cursed as an "awok". Her loved ones keep her real identity a secret to protect her from being misjudged, from being hurt and hurting other people.

== Cast and characters ==
Cast

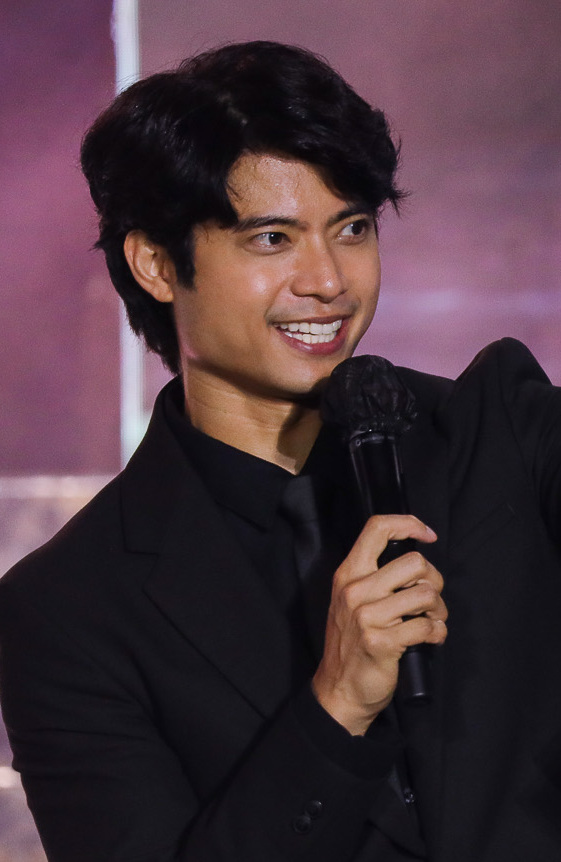
Mikael Daez

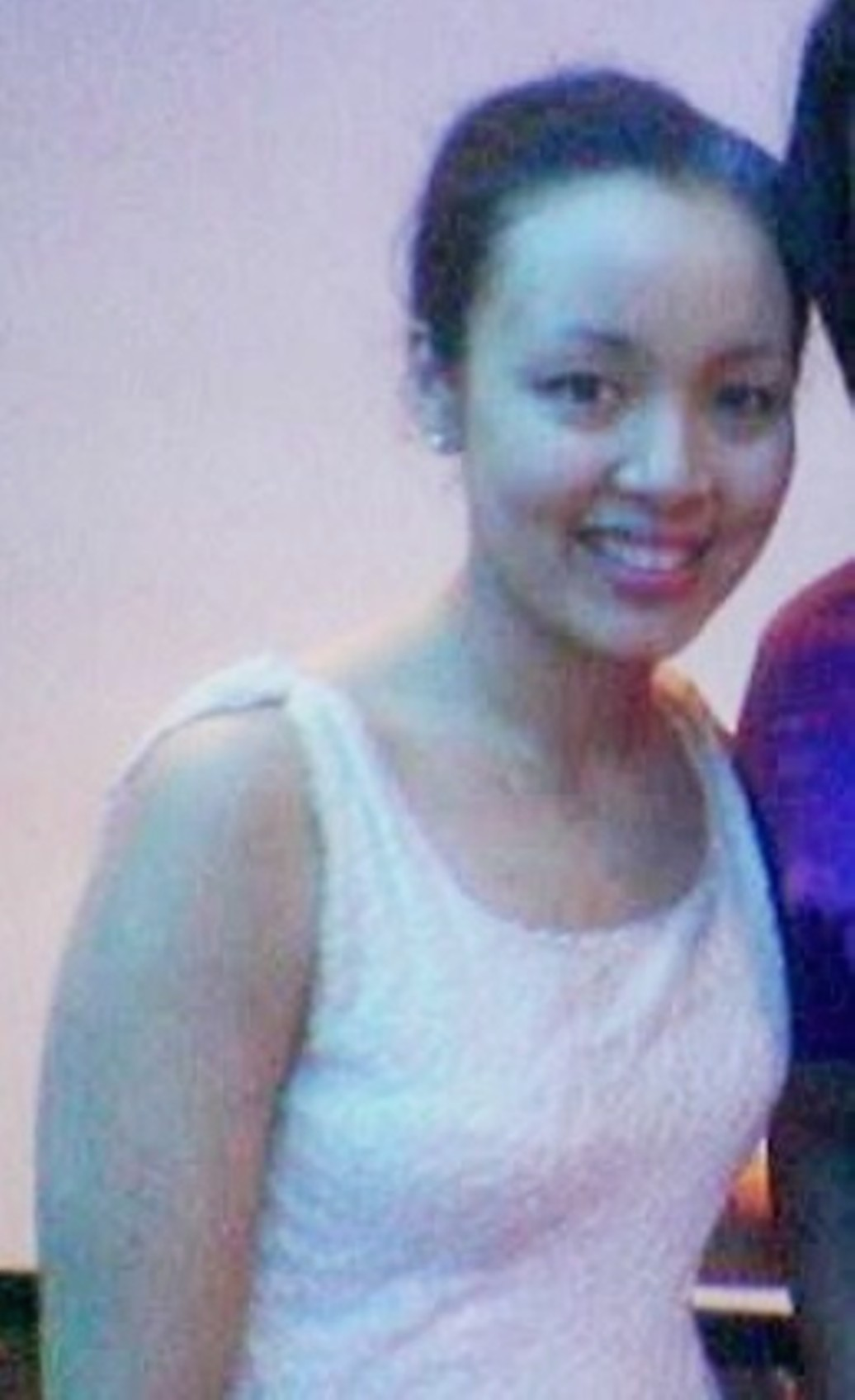
Cris Villonco

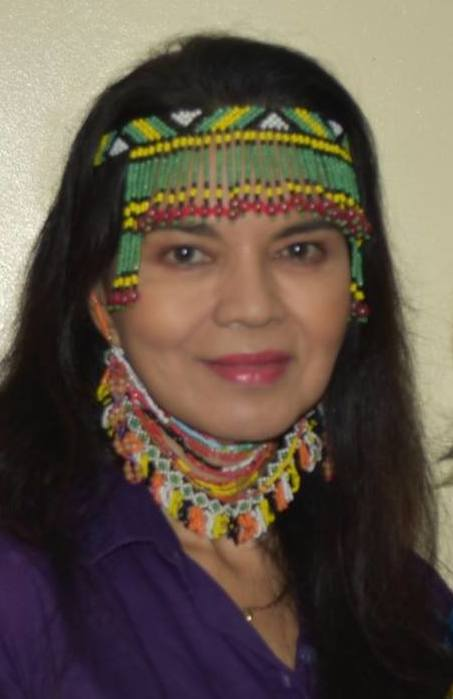
Maria Isabel Lopez

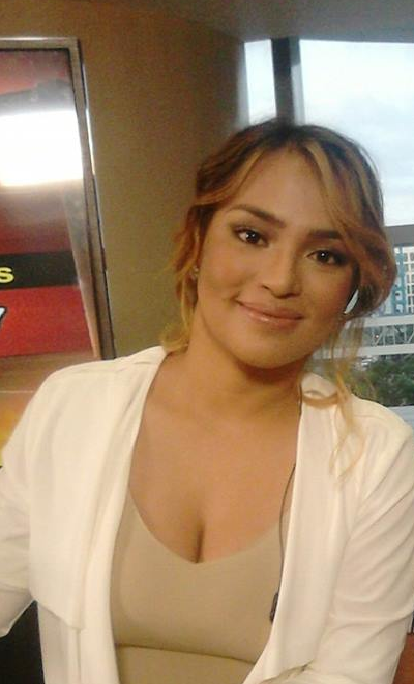
Erika Padilla

Lead cast

- Andrea Torres as Annasandra Vergara

Supporting cast

- Mikael Daez as William Benitez
- Rochelle Pangilinan as Esmeralda Salvador
- Pancho Magno as Enrico Sanchez
- Glydel Mercado as Belinda Vergara
- Emilio Garcia as Carlos Vergara
- Maria Isabel Lopez as Rosario Salvador
- Joyce Burton as Hazel Benitez
- Erika Padilla as Rebecca "Becca" Sanchez
- Arthur Solinap as Kenneth Gabriel
- Cris Villonco as Lorraine Armada

Guest cast

- Mike Lloren as Enrico's father
- Barbara Miguel as Annicka "Nikay" Sanchez
- Glenda Garcia as Enrico's mother
- Chinggoy Alonzo as Wilfredo Armada
- Juan Rodrigo as Jojo Salvador
- AJ Dee as Alex Benitez
- Winwyn Marquez as Tiana
- Mon Confiado as Dalik
- Dianne Hernandez as Stella
- Arianne Bautista as a reporter
- Rocco Nacino as Reneé
- Karel Marquez as Cecilia
- Gabriel de Leon as Jimmy
- Mercedes Cabral as Saling
- Joko Diaz as Emong
- Mega Unciano as Mikee
- Tess Bomb as Myrna

== Production ==
Principal photography commenced in July 2014. Filming concluded in January 2015.

== Ratings ==
According to AGB Nielsen Philippines' Mega Manila household television ratings, the pilot episode of Ang Lihim ni Annasandra earned a 14.3% rating. The final episode scored a 17.4% rating.

== Accolades ==
Accolades received by Ang Lihim ni Annasandra
Year	Award	Category	Recipient	Result	Ref.
2015	29th PMPC Star Awards for Television	Best Daytime Drama Series	Ang Lihim ni Annasandra	Nominated	
