= With a Smile (TV series) =

2013 Philippine television drama series

- Title card
- Genre: Drama; Romantic comedy
- Developed by: Don Michael Perez; Ma. Acy Ramos
- Written by: Abner Tulagan; Cel Santiago; Mario Banzon
- Directed by: Louie Ignacio
- Creative director: Jun Lana
- Starring: Christian Bautista; Mikael Daez; Andrea Torres
- Theme music composer: Vince Rod Catindig
- Opening theme: "Ngiti" by Christian Bautista
- Country of origin: Philippines
- Original language: Tagalog
- No. of episodes: 65

Production
- Executive producer: Arlene Pilapil
- Production locations: Quezon City, Philippines; Pampanga, Philippines
- Cinematography: Jun Fuentes; Jerry Dano
- Camera setup: Multiple-camera setup
- Running time: 30–45 minutes
- Production company: GMA Entertainment TV

Original release
- Network: GMA Network
- Release: June 24 – September 20, 2013

With a Smile is a 2013 Philippine television drama romantic comedy series broadcast by GMA Network. Directed by Louie Ignacio, it stars Andrea Torres, Christian Bautista and Mikael Daez. It premiered on June 24, 2013, on the network's morning line up. The series concluded on September 20, 2013, with a total of 65 episodes.

== Cast and characters ==
Cast

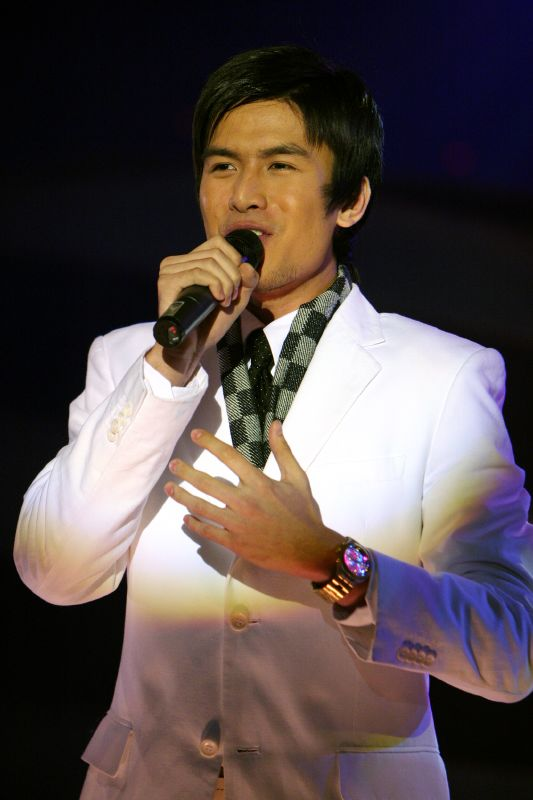
Christian Bautista

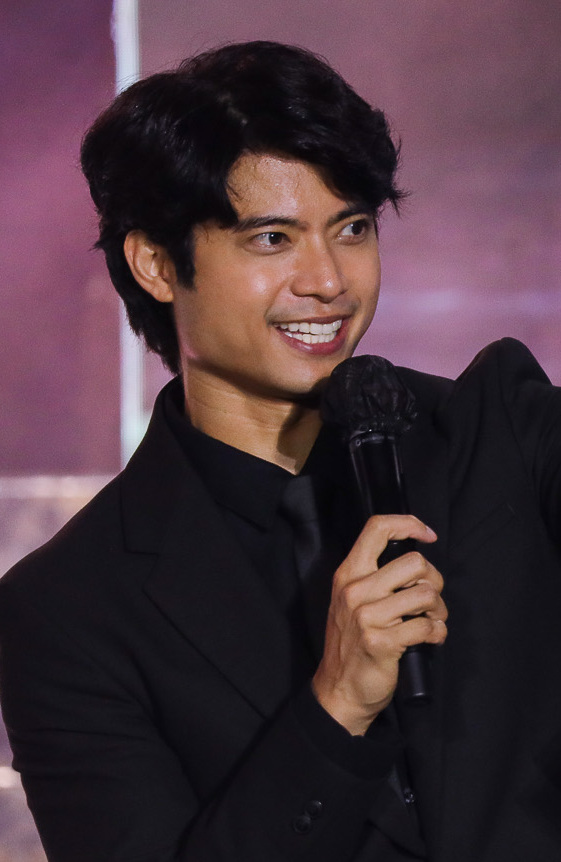
Mikael Daez

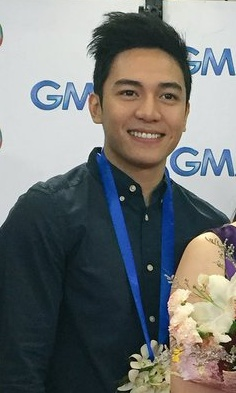
Jak Roberto

Lead cast

- Andrea Torres as Patricia "Isay" Asuncion
- Christian Bautista as Aston Martinez
- Mikael Daez as Dean Vicencio

Supporting cast

- Marnie Lapuz as Lena
- Soliman Cruz as Tomas "Tom" Asuncion
- Gilleth Sandico as Verci Asuncion
- Vince de Jesus as Teh
- Mikoy Morales as Mikoy
- Kimpoy Feliciano as Kimpoy
- Jak Roberto as Jak
- Shelly Hipolito as Sahsah
- Bryan Benedict as Athan
- RJ Padilla as Onyx
- Miggs Cuaderno as Budot

Guest cast

- Max Collins as Patricia
- Sam Pinto as Maricar

== Development ==
The idea for the series first came from screenwriter Ma. Acy Ramos, who initially had the idea to create a light drama-romantic comedy series for GMA Network's Afternoon Prime line up, which usually dominated by traditional telenovelas. When she presented and discussed the idea to GMA Entertainment TV Group, they immediately approved the project and decided to put it on morning time slot, because they thought "it would fit best there." Director and screenwriter, Don Michael Perez began writing a script for a series, which "somewhat" patterned from the Korean television series Lovers in Paris, with a different angle—two men are fighting over a girl.

The cast was announced during the series' story conference, with the main cast being Andrea Torres, Christian Bautista and Mikael Daez. The three actors were cast based on their auditions. Torres was chosen to play Isay Asuncion from more than 10 women who auditioned for the role. Torres shares certain similarities with her onscreen persona Isay, as they are both close to their families and determined to realize their dreams. Bautista, who played Aston Martinez, originally auditioned for the role of Dean Vicencio. Daez originally auditioned for Aston, and later ended up portraying Dean Vicencio. Supporting casts include stage and TV actors Soliman Cruz, Gilleth Sandico and Marnie Lapuz; composer and comedian Vince de Jesus; and Protégé: The Battle For The Big Artista Break alumni Mikoy Morales, Shelly Hipolito and Bryan Benedict.

== Production ==
Principal photography commenced in May 2013. Most of the scenes were shot on location in Quezon City. Some portions were shot in the town of Pampanga. The series' premiere was planned for June 17, 2013. Due to programming-related problems, it was delayed until June 24, 2013.

== Ratings ==
According to AGB Nielsen Philippines' Mega Manila household television ratings, the pilot episode of With a Smile earned an 8.4% rating. The final episode scored an 8.3% rating.
