= I Can See You (TV series) =

Philippine television drama series

- Title card in 2021
- Genre: Drama
- Opening theme: "Kita Mo Ba" by Crystal Paras
- Country of origin: Philippines
- Original language: Tagalog
- No. of seasons: 3
- No. of episodes: 58

Production
- Executive producer: Darling Pulido-Torres
- Editors: Paolo Mendoza; Julius James Castillo
- Camera setup: Multiple-camera setup
- Running time: 24–32 minutes
- Production company: GMA Entertainment Group

Original release
- Network: GMA Network
- Release: September 28, 2020 – February 4, 2022

I Can See You is a Philippine television drama anthology series broadcast by GMA Network. It premiered on September 28, 2020 on the network's Telebabad line up. The series concluded on February 4, 2022, with a total of three seasons and 58 episodes.

The series is streaming online on YouTube.

== Cast and characters ==
Cast

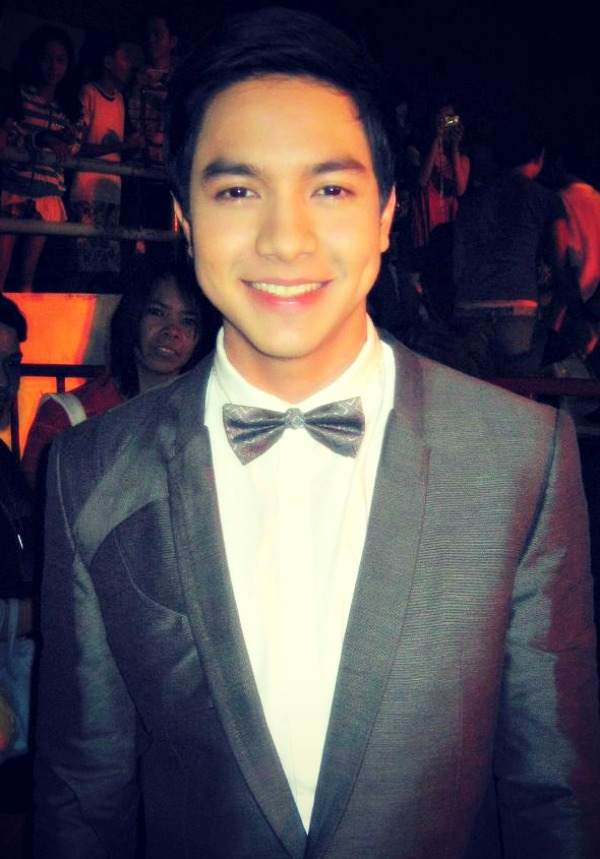
Alden Richards

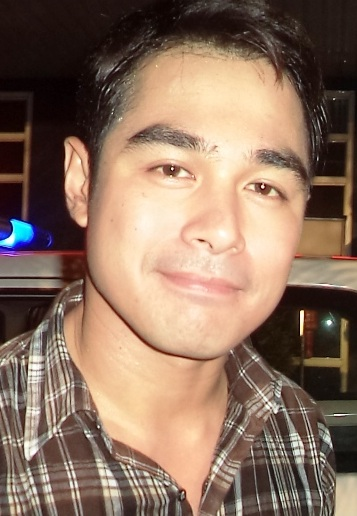
Benjamin Alves

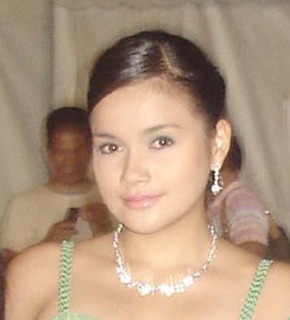
Yasmien Kurdi

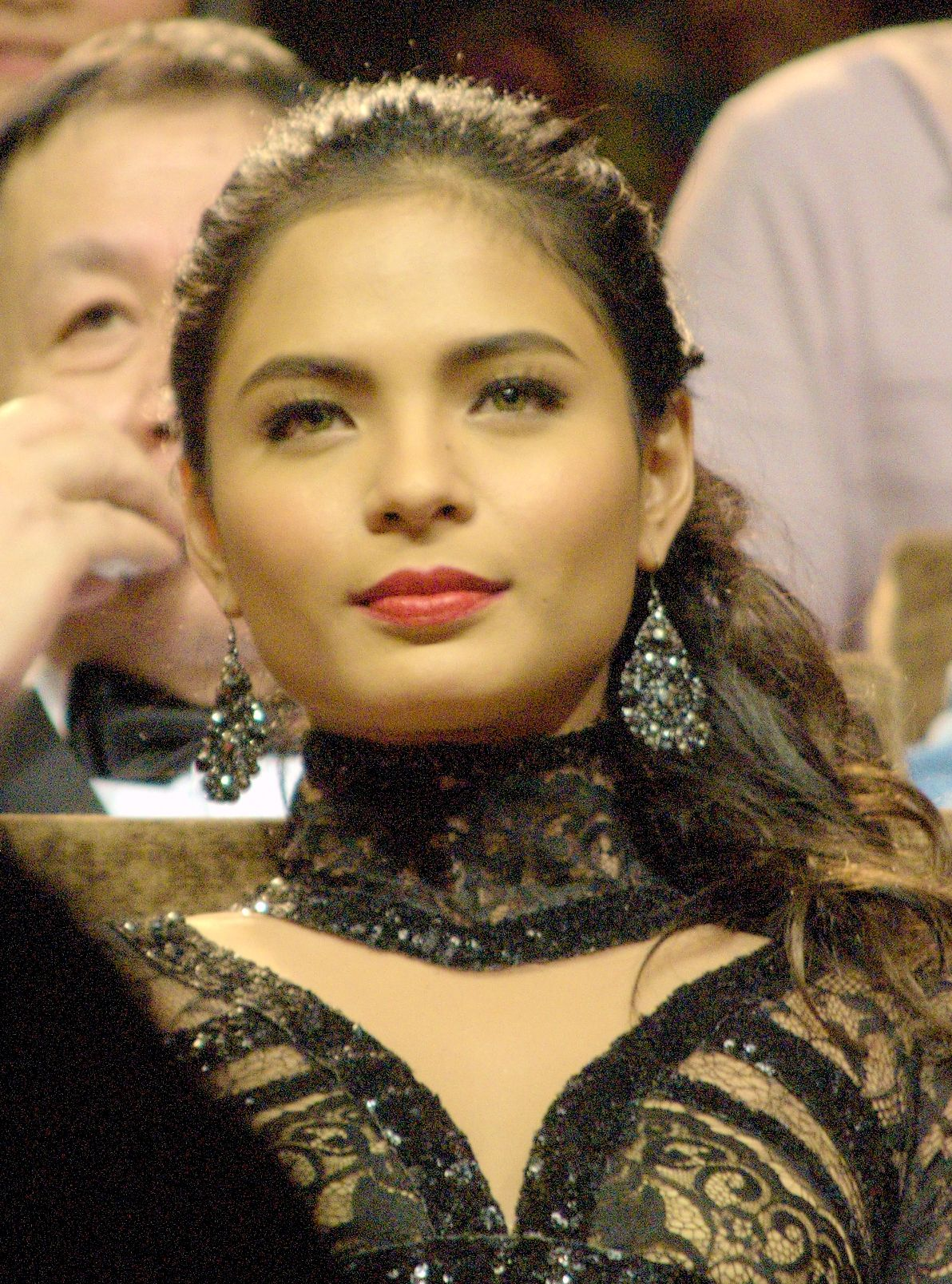
Lovi Poe

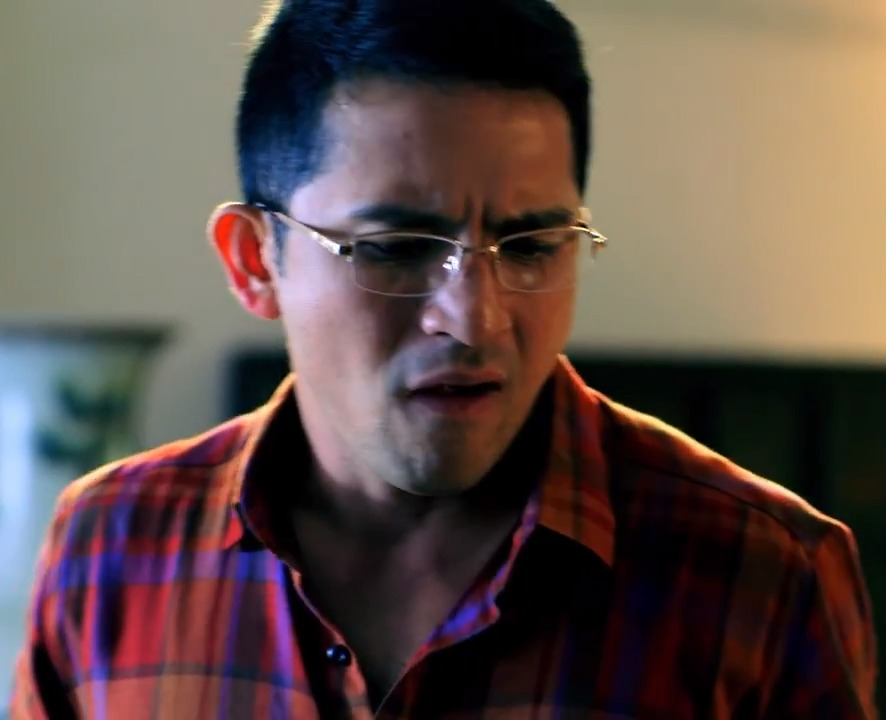
Dennis Trillo

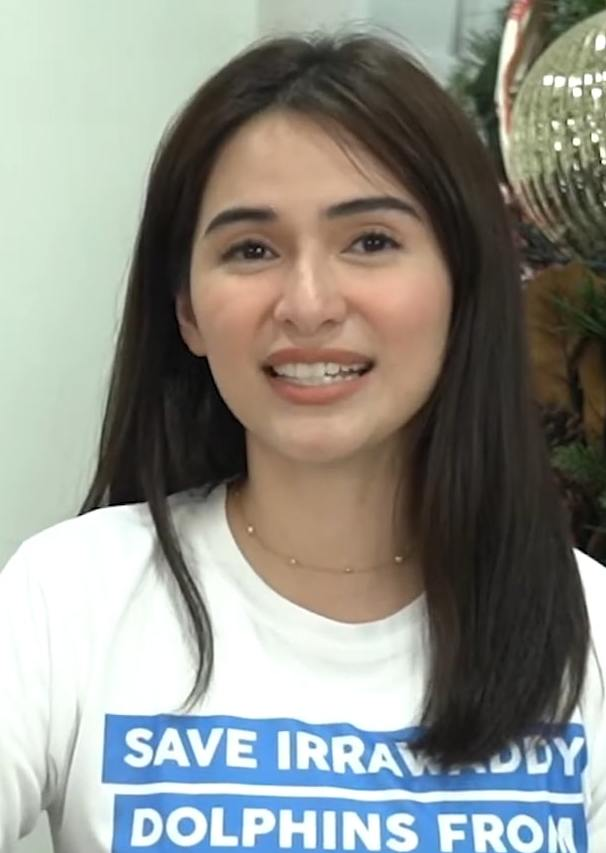
Jennylyn Mercado

Cast

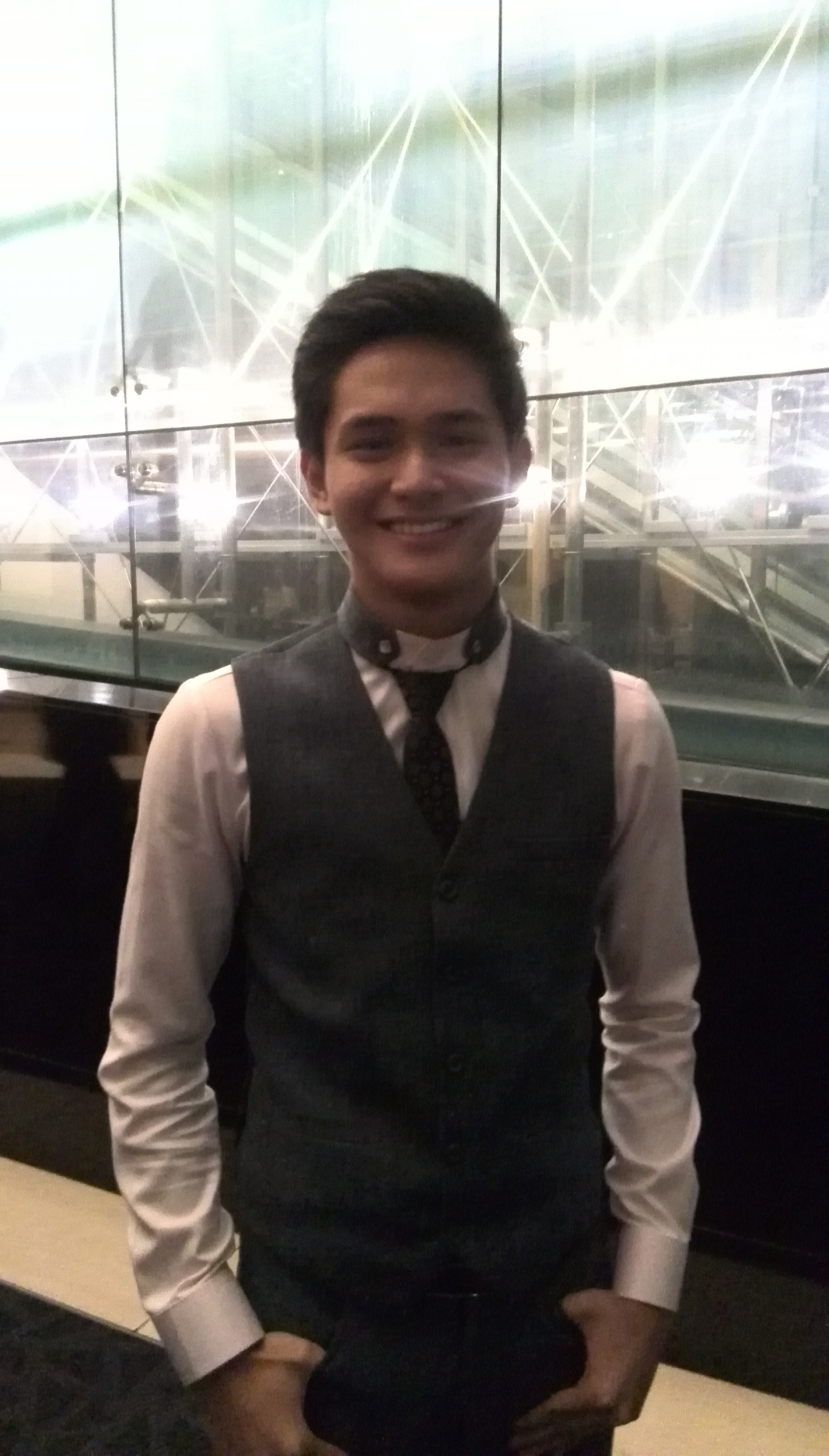
Ruru Madrid

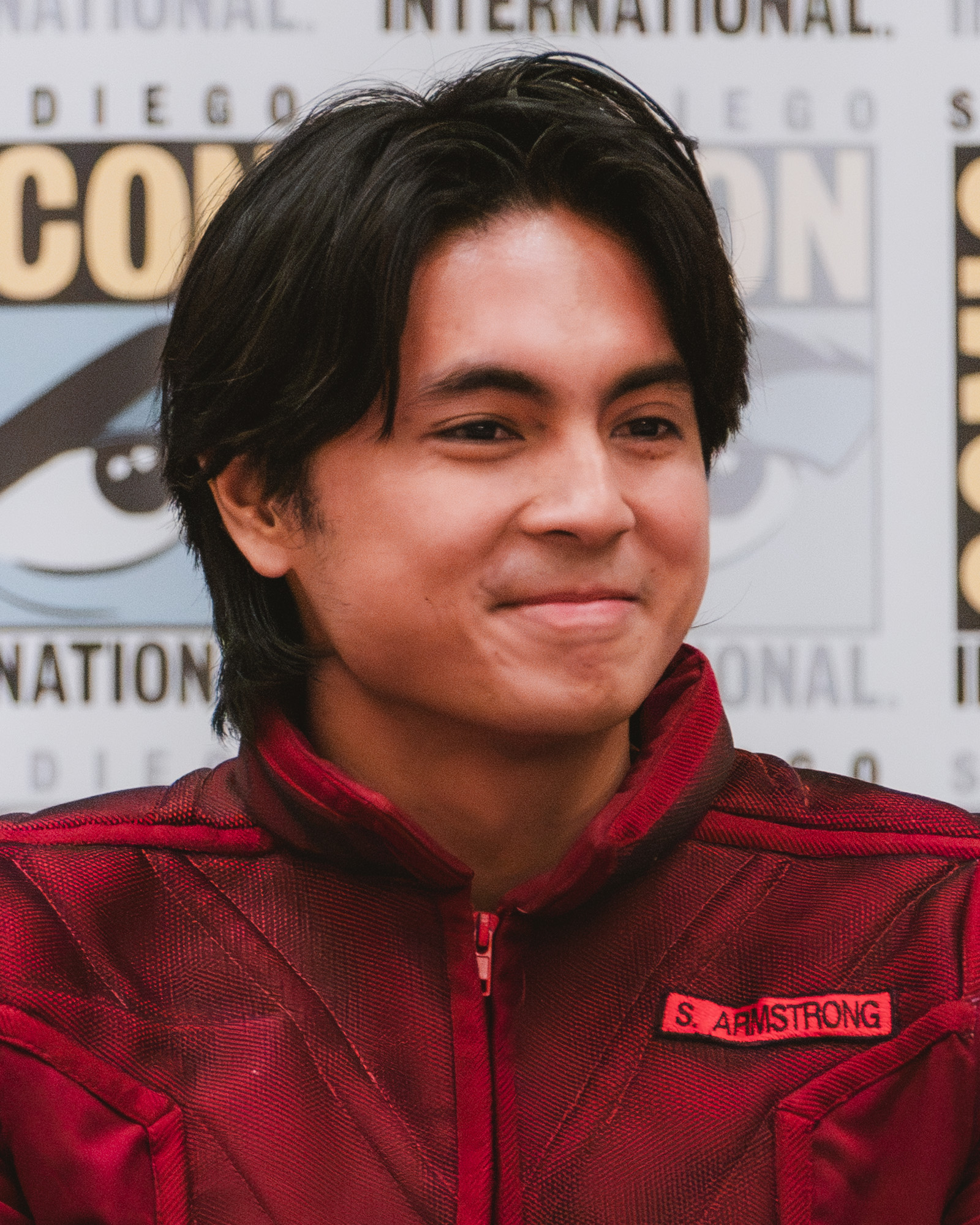
Miguel Tanfelix

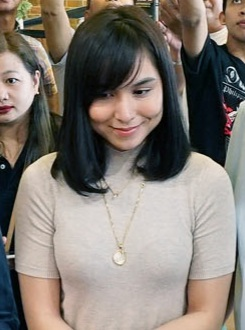
Kyline Alcantara

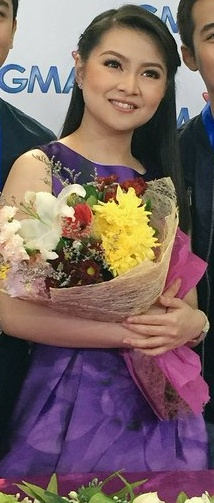
Barbie Forteza

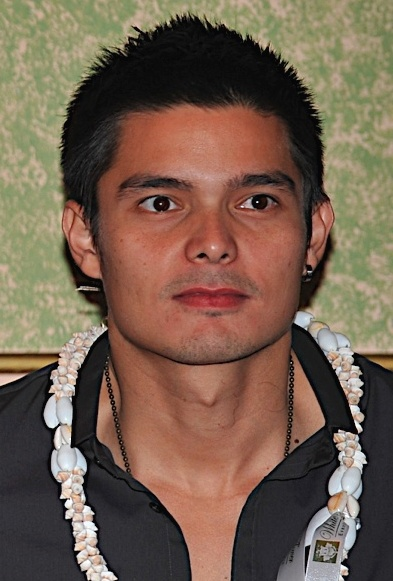
Dingdong Dantes

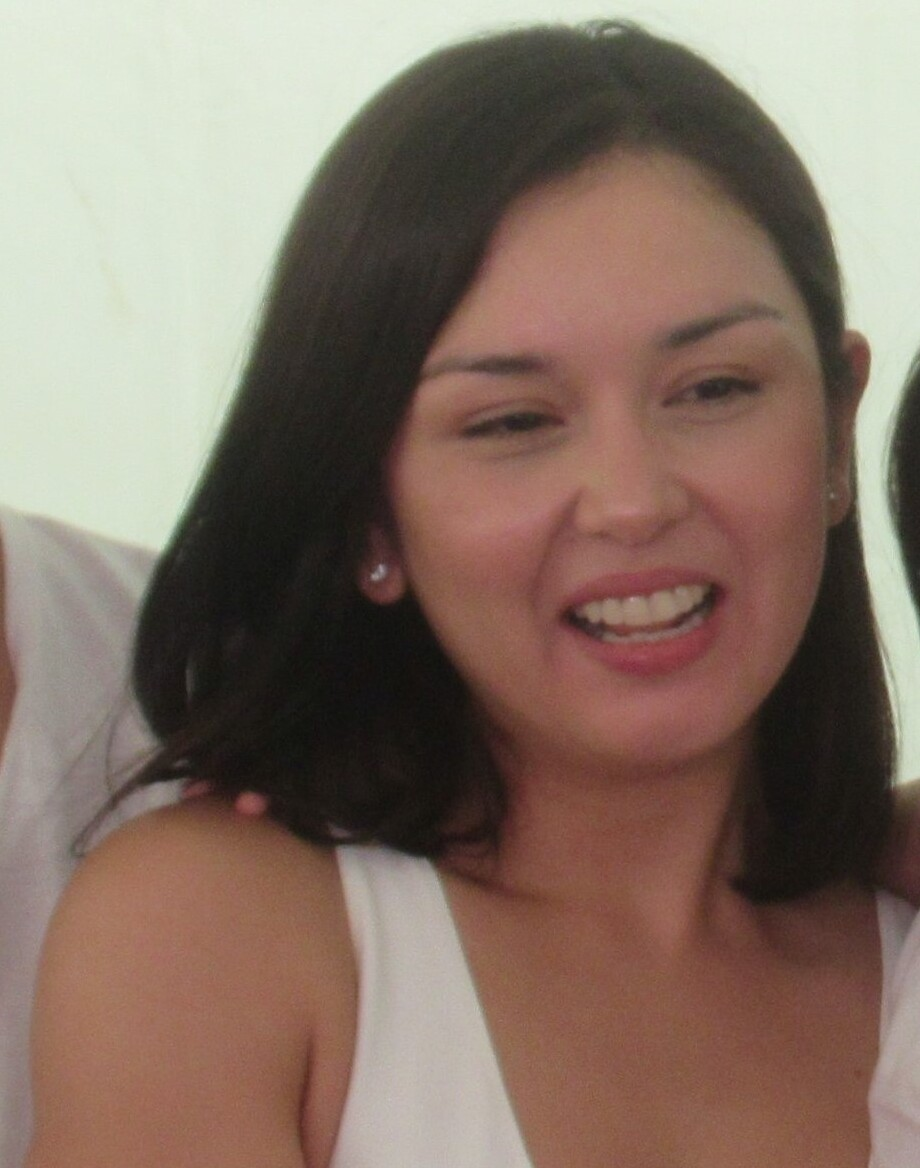
Beauty Gonzalez

=== Season 1 ===
Love on the Balcony

- Alden Richards as Iñigo "Gio" Mapa
- Jasmine Curtis-Smith as Lea Carbonel
- Pancho Magno as Val Valdez
- Denise Barbacena as Deedee Quijano
- Shyr Valdez as Connie Mapa

The Promise

- Paolo Contis as Frank Agoncillo
- Andrea Torres as Ivy Teodoro
- Benjamin Alves as Jude Agoncillo
- Maey Bautista as Rowena Marquez
- Yasmien Kurdi as Clarisse Agoncillo

High-Rise Lovers

- Lovi Poe as Samantha "Sam" Alvarez
- Winwyn Marquez as Ysabel Ortiz
- Tom Rodriguez as Luisito "Luis" Alvarez
- Teresa Loyzaga as Greta
- Divine Tetay as Ru Paul
- Ruru Madrid as Jared

Truly. Madly. Deadly.

- Jennylyn Mercado as Coleen De Vera
- Dennis Trillo as Andrew "Drew" Rivera / Warren Devira
- Rhian Ramos as Abby Lopez
- Jhoana Marie Tan as Tere
- Ruby Rodriguez as Marge
- Ollie Espino as Jerry

=== Season 2 ===
On My Way to You!

- Ruru Madrid as Jerrick Alfonso
- Shaira Diaz as Racquel "Raki" Buena-Alfonso
- Malou de Guzman as Viviana "Manang Baby" Fajardo
- Arra San Agustin as Samantha "Tammy" Razon
- Gil Cuerva as Albert Manansala
- Ashley Rivera as Lani Paras
- Richard Yap as George Alfonso
- Gelli de Belen as Rosanna Alfonso
- Robert Seña as Rod Buena
- Isay Alvarez as Ellie Buena

#Future

- Miguel Tanfelix as Vinchie Torres
- Kyline Alcantara as Lara Dacer
- Aiko Melendez as Menchie Torres
- Gabby Eigenmann as Elvin Torres
- Mikoy Morales as Royce Carlos
- Dani Porter as Analyn Fuentes
- J-Mee Katanyag as Kakai
- Francis Mata as Walter

The Lookout

- Barbie Forteza as Emma Castro
- Paul Salas as Marius Penuliar
- Christopher de Leon as Robert Penuliar
- Adrian Alandy as Jason "Lakay" Bautista
- Arthur Solinap as Randy Penuliar
- Marina Benipayo as Tessa Penuliar
- Elijah Alejo as Christine Penuliar
- Ella Cristofani as Joanne Castro
- Luis Hontiveros as Dalo
- Jana Trias as Minda
- Benjie Paras as a captain

=== Season 3 ===
AlterNate

- Dingdong Dantes as Jonathan "Nate" David / Michael Trajano
- Beauty Gonzalez as Sheila David
- Ricky Davao as Lyndon David
- Jackie Lou Blanco as Carmencita "Cita" David
- Joyce Ching as Angelica "Angie" Trajano
- Bryan Benedict as Joey
- Yan Yuzon as Darwin Trinidad

== Episodes ==
=== Season 1 ===
Episodes of Love on the Balcony
No. overall	No. in season	Title	Directed by	Original release date
1	1	"Pilot"	L.A. Madridejos	September 28, 2020
2	2	"Virtual Romance"	L.A. Madridejos	September 29, 2020
3	3	"The Date"	L.A. Madridejos	September 30, 2020
4	4	"The Kiss"	L.A. Madridejos	October 1, 2020
5	5	"Smile Again"	L.A. Madridejos	October 2, 2020

Episodes of The Promise
No. overall	No. in season	Title	Directed by	Original release date
6	6	"Pilot"	Zig Dulay	October 5, 2020
7	7	"Pagbabalik" (transl. return)	Zig Dulay	October 6, 2020
8	8	"Date"	Zig Dulay	October 7, 2020
9	9	"Lihim" (transl. secret)	Zig Dulay	October 8, 2020
10	10	"New Beginning"	Zig Dulay	October 9, 2020

Episodes of High-Rise Lovers
No. overall	No. in season	Title	Directed by	Original release date
11	11	"Pilot"	Monti Parungao	October 12, 2020
12	12	"The Kiss"	Monti Parungao	October 13, 2020
13	13	"Exposed"	Monti Parungao	October 14, 2020
14	14	"Confrontation"	Monti Parungao	October 15, 2020
15	15	"Forgiveness"	Monti Parungao	October 16, 2020

Episodes of Truly. Madly. Deadly
No. overall	No. in season	Title	Directed by	Original release date
16	16	"Pilot"	Jorron Lee Monroy	October 19, 2020
17	17	"Stalker"	Jorron Lee Monroy	October 20, 2020
18	18	"Evil Lover"	Jorron Lee Monroy	October 21, 2020
19	19	"Pasabog" (transl. explosion)	Jorron Lee Monroy	October 22, 2020
20	20	"Deadly Finale"	Jorron Lee Monroy	October 23, 2020

=== Season 2 ===
Episodes of On My Way to You!
No. overall	No. in season	Title	Directed by	Original release date
21	1	"Runaway Bride"	Mark Reyes	March 22, 2021
22	2	"Raki Meets Jerrick (Hate at the First Sight)"	Mark Reyes	March 23, 2021
23	3	"Alone Together"	Mark Reyes	March 24, 2021
24	4	"Perfect Moment"	Mark Reyes	March 25, 2021
25	5	"Goodbye"	Mark Reyes	March 26, 2021
26	6	"Tammy Returns"	Mark Reyes	March 29, 2021
27	7	"Wedding Planner"	Mark Reyes	March 30, 2021
28	8	"Road to Forever"	Mark Reyes	March 31, 2021

Episodes of #Future
No. overall	No. in season	Title	Directed by	Original release date
29	9	"Pilot"	Dominic Zapata	April 5, 2021
30	10	"Vinchie Meets Lara"	Dominic Zapata	April 6, 2021
31	11	"Guilt"	Dominic Zapata	April 7, 2021
32	12	"Danger"	Dominic Zapata	April 8, 2021
33	13	"Endgame"	Dominic Zapata	April 9, 2021

Episodes of The Lookout
No. overall	No. in season	Title	Directed by	Original release date
34	14	"Pilot"	Jules Katanyag	April 19, 2021
35	15	"Break In"	Jules Katanyag	April 20, 2021
36	16	"Hero"	Jules Katanyag	April 21, 2021
37	17	"Reunited"	Jules Katanyag	April 22, 2021
38	18	"New Beginning"	Jules Katanyag	April 23, 2021

=== Season 3 ===
Episodes of AlterNate
No. overall	No. in season	Title	Directed by	Original release date
39	1	"Pilot"	Dominic Zapata	January 10, 2022
40	2	"The Kiss"	Dominic Zapata	January 11, 2022
41	3	"Twin Lives"	Dominic Zapata	January 12, 2022
42	4	"The Pretender"	Dominic Zapata	January 13, 2022
43	5	"Pretensions"	Dominic Zapata	January 14, 2022
44	6	"Big Mistake"	Dominic Zapata	January 17, 2022
45	7	"The Thief"	Dominic Zapata	January 18, 2022
46	8	"Secrets Exposed"	Dominic Zapata	January 19, 2022
47	9	"Lyndon vs. Nate"	Dominic Zapata	January 20, 2022
48	10	"Guilt"	Dominic Zapata	January 21, 2022
49	11	"I Can't See You"	Dominic Zapata	January 24, 2022
50	12	"Voices"	Dominic Zapata	January 25, 2022
51	13	"The Witness"	Dominic Zapata	January 26, 2022
52	14	"Blame Game"	Dominic Zapata	January 27, 2022
53	15	"Another Kiss"	Dominic Zapata	January 28, 2022
54	16	"Affair"	Dominic Zapata	January 31, 2022
55	17	"Leaving Nate"	Dominic Zapata	February 1, 2022
56	18	"Shiela's Choice"	Dominic Zapata	February 2, 2022
57	19	"Nate vs. Michael"	Dominic Zapata	February 3, 2022
58	20	"Final Encounter"	Dominic Zapata	February 4, 2022

== Accolades ==
Accolades received by I Can See You
Year	Award	Category	Recipient	Result	Ref.
2023	35th PMPC Star Awards for Television	Best Drama Mini Series	I Can See You	Nominated	
