= Ka-Blog! =

Philippine television infotainment show

- Title card
- Genre: Infotainment
- Presented by: Andrea Torres; Mico Aytona; Monica Verallo
- Country of origin: Philippines
- Original language: Tagalog

Production
- Executive producer: Marissa Flores
- Camera setup: Multiple-camera setup
- Running time: 30 minutes
- Production company: GMA News and Public Affairs

Original release
- Network: GMA Network
- Release: August 9, 2008 – October 2, 2010

Ka-Blog! is a Philippine television infotainment show broadcast by GMA Network. Hosted by Andrea Torres, Mico Aytona and Monica Verallo, it premiered on August 9, 2008. The show concluded on October 2, 2010.

== Overview ==
The show serves as the "tambayan" for teenagers to get a load of the latest updates trends, and information on the many issues relevant to them—from fashion forecasts to tech toys, hangouts and the "heartthrobs", as well as more problems that concern teenagers, such as relationship and peer issues.

== Hosts ==
- Andrea Torres
- Mico Aytona
- Monica Verallo
- Lucky Mercado

== Accolades ==
Accolades received by Ka-Blog!
Year	Award	Category	Recipient	Result	Ref.
2009	Japan Prize for TV	Youth Category	"Ka-Blog Peeps Special"	Runner-up	
2009	23rd PMPC Star Awards for Television	Best Youth-Oriented Show	Ka-Blog!	Won	
2010	24th PMPC Star Awards for Television	Best Youth-Oriented Show	Ka-Blog!	Nominated	
