= Blood in Dispute =

2015 Filipino-Cambodian film

- Khmer theatrical release poster
- Directed by: Ken Simpson
- Written by: Romilly Belcourt; Ken Simpson
- Produced by: Deung Puth Por
- Starring: Andrea Torres; Mikael Daez; Meas Thorn Srenai; Khat Vaihang; Tep Rindaro
- Cinematography: Alex Dacev
- Production companies: Phum Pich Films; GMA Network; Cambodian Television Network
- Distributed by: GMA Pictures (Note: Distributor in the Philippines only. Uncredited under the predecessor, GMA Films.)
- Release dates: August 9, 2015 (Cambodia); April 17, 2016 (Philippines)
- Running time: 140 minutes
- Countries: Cambodia; Philippines
- Languages: Khmer; Filipino

Blood in Dispute (Khmer: សង្គ្រាមបងប្អូន, Sangkream Bangobaaun lit. War Brothers) is a 2015 action drama film directed by Canadian director Ken Simpson and stars Filipino actors Andrea Torres and Mikael Daez and Cambodian actors Meas Thorn Srenai, Khat Vaihang, and Tep Rindaro. The film was released as Fight for Love in the Philippines.

The film was made in collaboration of the Cambodian Television Network (CTN) and GMA Network of the Philippines.

== Synopsis ==
25 years after fleeing Cambodia for the Philippines, Mr. Sokun (Tep Rindaro) discovers a letter that compels him to return. As Mr. Sokun uncovers the details of a family secret from his youth, he realizes it has huge ramifications for his muay thai fighting son, Marco (Mikael Daez) and his bokator trained counterpart Sokeat (Khat Vaihang). With their lives in danger, Mr. Sokun must enlist the help of Marco's beleaguered girlfriend Angela (Andrea Torres) and Sokeat's childhood friend Sonita (Meas Thorn Srenai) to stop the two rivals from fighting.

== Cast ==
- Tep Rindaro as Mr. Sokun
- Mikael Daez as Marco
- Khat Vaihang as Sokeat
- Andrea Torres as Angela
- Meas Thorn Srenai as Sonita

== Production ==
Production of the film took three years to complete.

== Release ==
The film was released on August 9, 2015, in all major theaters in Phnom Penh and Siem Reap, Cambodia. The film was shown in Cambodian theaters for two weeks before it is shown during a special TV release to the Cambodian public on CTN.

However, the film was not released in Philippine theaters by GMA Pictures, but instead GMA Films producers decided, it was shown on GMA Network via the network's Sunday Night Box Office movie block. The movie was split into two parts, with the first part shown on April 17, 2016, and the second part on April 24, 2016.
