= Pancho Magno =

Filipino actor

- Born: Pancho Angelo Acuña Magno; October 2, 1986 (age 40); Marikina, Philippines
- Occupations: Actor, model
- Years active: 2011–present
- Agent(s): GMA Artist Center (2011–2026); Viva Artists Agency (2026–present)
- Height: 1.84 m (6 ft 0 in)
- Spouse: Max Collins (m. 2017; div. 2024)
- Children: 1

Pancho Angelo Acuña Magno (born October 2, 1986) is a Filipino actor. He is the oldest son of Redgie Magno, VP for Drama Productions, GMA Network.

== Early and personal life ==
Magno married Max Collins in Manila on December 11, 2017. They have a son, Skye Anakin, who was born on July 6, 2020. In May 2023, Collins confirmed her split with Magno. They divorced in October 2024.

== Filmography ==
=== Film ===
Year	Title	Role	Note(s)	Ref(s).
2016	Pilapil			

=== Television ===
Year	Title	Role	Notes
2011–2012	Amaya	Agul	
2012	Broken Vow	Rico	
2012	Kasalanan Bang Ibigin Ka?	Tristan	
2012–2013	Magdalena: Anghel sa Putikan	Jet Collado	
2013	Unforgettable	Darwin Toledo	
2013	Magpakailanman: Child For Sale	Dennis	
2013	My Husband's Lover	Paul Salcedo	
2014	Kambal Sirena	Homer Villanueva	
2014	Magpakailanman: Nakakulong Ng Puso	Rowell	
2014–2015	Ang Lihim ni Annasandra	Enrico Diaz	
2015	Maynila	Archie de Guzman	
2015	The Half Sisters	Wancho Rodriguez	27 episodes
2016–2017	Encantadia	Hitano / Berdano	
2016	Magpakailanman: Ang Sundalong Magiting	2nd Lt. Jerome Jacuba	
2017–2018	Haplos	Benedict Dizon	
2018	Imbestigador: Abo	Staff Sgt. Mark Herbert Oberes	
2018	Imbestigador: Bawal na Pag-ibig?	Dennis	
2018	Imbestigador: The Jessica Efondo Rape-Slay Case	Victor Efondo	
2018	Magpakailanman: Ang Kamao ng Beking Boksingero (The Yohan Golez Story)	Johnny	
2018	Imbestigador: Babae sa Tubig	Jonart Taruc	
2018	Victor Magtanggol	Móði	
2019	Magpakailanman: Confessions of a Lesbian Wife (The Maria Luisa Fonseca Story)	Lando	
2019	Imbestigador: Lady Cop	Jamewell Campano	
2019	Dahil sa Pag-ibig	Gary Sandoval	
2020	I Can See You: Love on the Balcony	Val Valdez	
2021	First Yaya	Conrad Enriquez	
2022	First Lady	Conrad Enriquez	
2023	Mga Lihim ni Urduja	Kenzo Diaz	
2023	Voltes V: Legacy	Takeo	
2023	Love Before Sunrise	Matthew	
2024	Shining Inheritance	Paolo	
2025	Binibining Marikit	Sonny Montero	
2025–2026	Cruz vs Cruz	Joel Santiago	
2026–present	ASAP XP	Himself	Guest performer and host
