= Mikael Daez =

Filipino actor and model

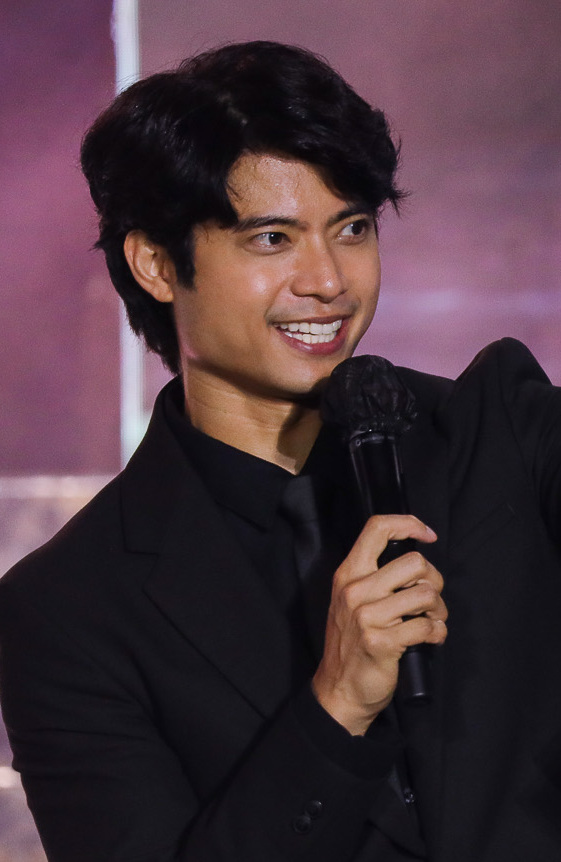
- Daez in 2023
- Born: Mikael Banzon Daez; January 6, 1988 (age 38); Manila, Philippines
- Other names: Mik, Kap
- Occupations: Actor, model, television host
- Years active: 2011–present
- Agents: Sparkle GMA Artist Center Mercator Artist and Model Management; Vidanes Celebrity Marketing
- Height: 1.83 m (6 ft 0 in)
- Spouse: Megan Young (m. 2020)
- Children: 1
- Relatives: Emilio Daez (brother)

Mikael Banzon Daez (Tagalog: [mikaˈʔel ˈdaʔes]; born January 6, 1988) is a Filipino commercial model, actor, news anchor, television and events presenter, and vlogger. Daez is well known for his starring role in Amaya, a Philippine historical drama, alongside Marian Rivera. He also starred in 2011 in the remake of the hit blockbuster 1980s film Temptation Island under GMA Films. He is currently an exclusive talent of GMA Network, Sparkle GMA Artist Center and GMA Pictures.

== Biography ==
Daez started his career as a commercial model in various advertisements and projects. Later on, Daez started opening his career into acting, and is currently signed with GMA Network in the Philippines.

=== Personal life ===
Mikhael Banzon Daez was born on January 6, 1988, in Manila, Philippines to a family of nine siblings. He attended the Ateneo de Manila University from grade school to college, earning a degree in business management.

His younger sister Bea Daez is a graduate of the University of the Philippines and was a varsity basketball player for the UP Fighting Maroons. She also provides commentaries for the UAAP Men's & Women's Basketball games.

On January 25, 2020, he married his longtime girlfriend Megan Young. Their first child was born in 2025.

== Filmography ==
=== Film ===
Year	Title	Role	Note(s)
2011	Joey Gosiengfiao's Temptation Island	Ricardo	
2012	Sosy Problems: It Girls Just Wanna Have Fun	Santiago Elizalde	
2015	Blood in Dispute	Marco	

=== Television ===
Year	Title	Role
2011–2012	Amaya	Lumad
2011	Amaya: The Making of an Epic	Himself
2011	Spooky Nights Presents: Bampirella	Michael Dela Rosa
2012	My Beloved	Nelson De Guia
2012	Legacy	Himself (Miss Tala Pageant Host)
2012–2013	Sana Ay Ikaw Na Nga	Carlos Miguel Altamonte
2012–2019	Bubble Gang	Himself
2013	Saksi	Himself / Segment anchor for "Midnight Express"
2013	With a Smile	Dean Vicencio
2013	Titser	Kurt Reyes
2013	Wagas: Ang Aking Pangako	Ronnick
2013–2014	Adarna	Falco
2014	Wagas: Howie and Ipat Love Story	Howie Severino
2014	The Ryzza Mae Show	Himself (guest)
2014–2016	Ismol Family	Bernie
2014–2015	Ang Lihim ni Annasandra	William Benitez
2015	Blood in Dispute	Marco
2015	My Faithful Husband	Dean Montenegro
2015	Dangwa	Jericho Santillian / Leon McAllister
2015	Wagas: Born to Love You	Nielsen Donato
2016	Poor Señorita	Rafael 'Paeng' Castillo
2016	Dear Uge: Acting Dyowa	Patrick
2016	Wagas: Love at Second Sight	Sonny Angara
2016	Someone to Watch Over Me	Dave
2017	Legally Blind	Edward Villareal
2017	Tsuperhero	Han
2017	People vs. the Stars	Himself (contestant)
2017	Follow Your Heart	Himself (contestant)
2017	Daig Kayo ng Lola Ko: Red Mildred and the Wolf	Temyong
2017–2018	Celebrity Bluff	Himself / Guest Player
2017–2018	All-Star Videoke	Himself (contestant)
2018	Lip Sync Battle Philippines	Himself (contestant)
2018	The Stepdaughters	Francis Almeda
2018	Dear Uge: Bagong Bahay, Bagong Away	Carlo
2019	Alex and Amie	Alex Sablay
2019	Dear Uge: Paano makawala sa friendzone?	Jake
2019	Daddy's Gurl	Kanye
2019	Studio 7	Himself (guest)
2020–2021	Love of My Life	Nikolai Gonzales
2020	The Boobay and Tekla Show	Himself (guest)
2021	The Final Word with Rico Hizon	Himself (guest)
2022	The Best Ka!	Himself (host)
2022–2023	Family Feud	Himself (guest player)
2022–2024	Running Man Philippines	Himself (contestant)
2023	Royal Blood	Kristoff Royales
2023	TiktoClock	Himself (guest)
2023–2024	Fast Talk with Boy Abunda	Himself (guest)
2024	It's Showtime	Himself (guest)

== Awards ==
Year	Film award/critics	Award/nomination
2012	Favorite Movies, TV Show, & Music Awards	Most Promising Actor of the Year (Included)
2011	1st Yahoo! OMG Awards	Amazing Male Newcomer nomination
2011	100 Sexiest Men in the Philippines	Rank #62
2011	Golden Screen TV Awards	Outstanding Breakthrough Performance by an Actor Nominee for Amaya
