= Amaya (TV series) =

Philippine television drama series

- Title card
- Genre: Historical drama
- Created by: Suzette Doctolero
- Written by: Onay Sales; Marlon Miguel; Geng Delgado
- Directed by: Mac Alejandre
- Creative director: Jun Lana
- Starring: Marian Rivera
- Theme music composer: Von de Guzman
- Opening theme: "Amaya" by Von de Guzman
- Country of origin: Philippines
- Original languages: Tagalog; Cebuano; Malay
- No. of episodes: 165

Production
- Executive producers: Michelle Borja; Camille Gomba-Montaño
- Production locations: Pangasinan, Philippines; Bataan, Philippines; Batangas, Philippines; Bulacan, Philippines
- Editor: Tara Illenberger
- Camera setup: Multiple-camera setup
- Running time: 21–37 minutes
- Production company: GMA Entertainment TV

Original release
- Network: GMA Network
- Release: May 30, 2011 – January 13, 2012

Amaya (Baybayin: ᜀᜋᜌ) is a Philippine television drama historical series broadcast by GMA Network. Directed by Mac Alejandre, it stars Marian Rivera in the title role. The series is set in the pre-colonial period of the 1500s. It premiered on May 30, 2011 on the network's Telebabad line up. The series concluded on January 13, 2012, with a total of 165 episodes.

The series is streaming online on YouTube.

== Premise ==
Amaya, born in the reign of Rajah Mangubat and as the daughter Datu Bugna, she is a "binukot" - a hidden princess and can't step on ground. Born with a twin snake, a secret hidden by her father to keep her away from danger. Due to having a twin snake, her destiny is to become the savior of her land against Rajah Mangubat.

== Cast and characters ==
Cast

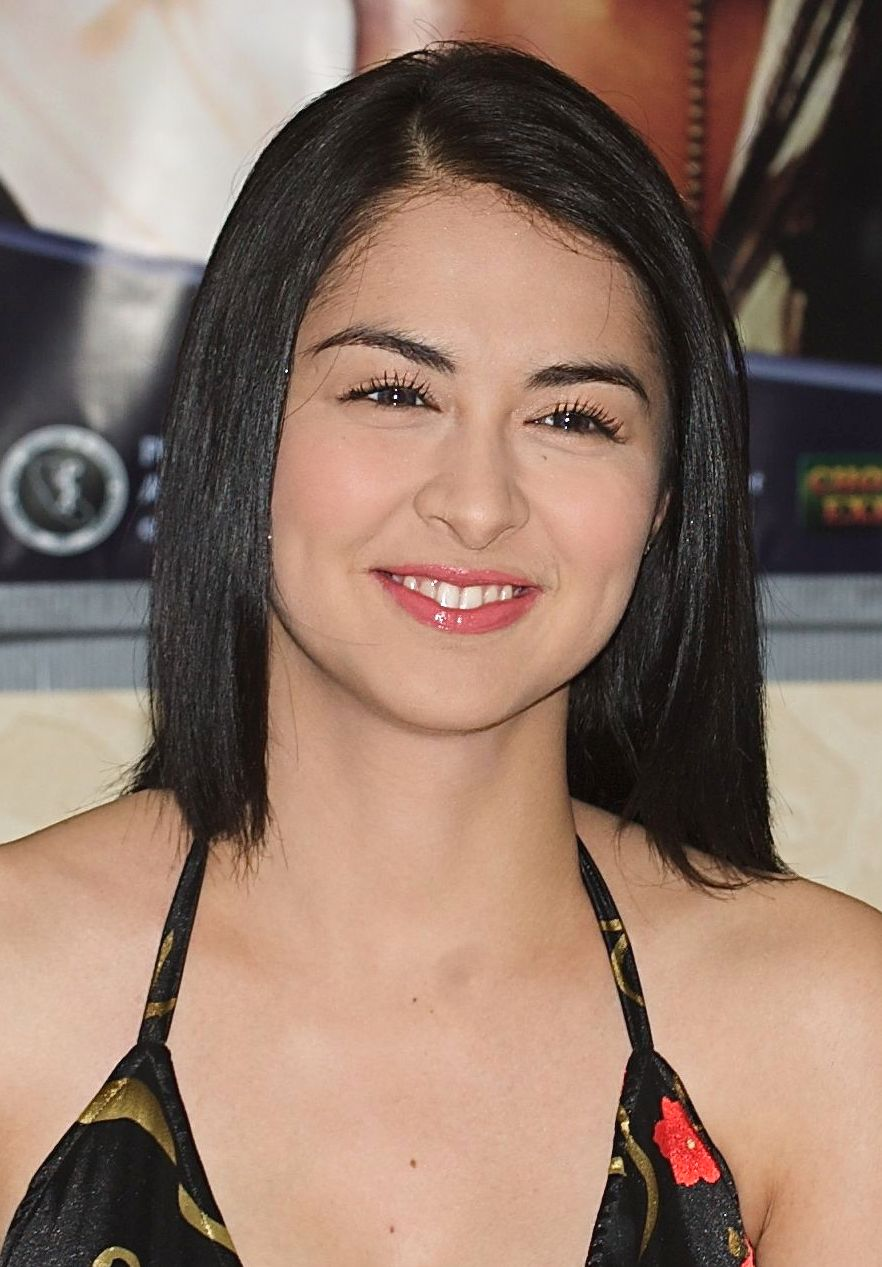
Marian Rivera

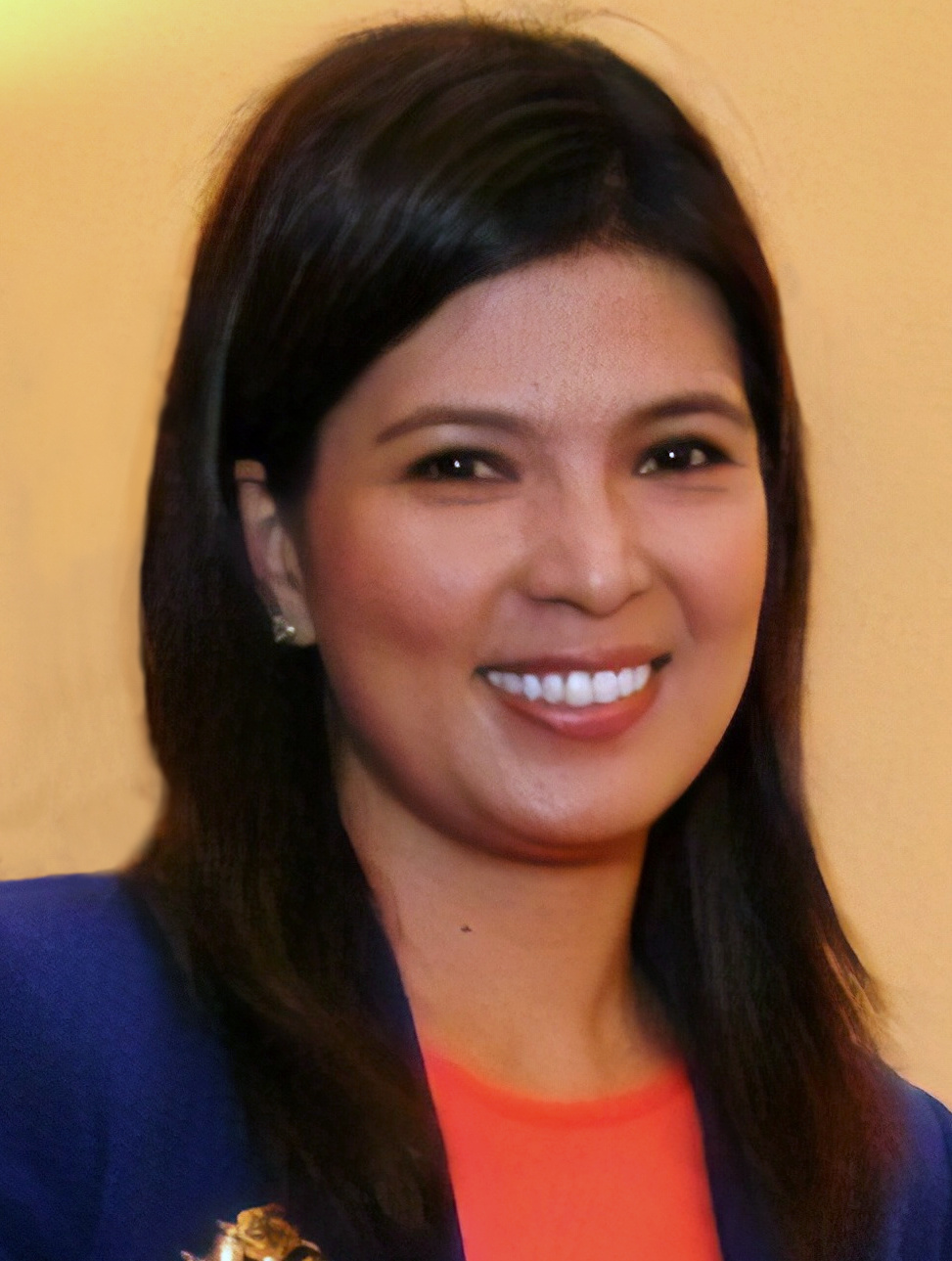
Lani Mercado

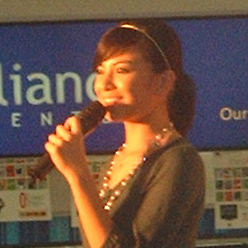
Glaiza de Castro

Lead cast

- Marian Rivera as Bai Amaya

Supporting cast

- Sid Lucero as Bagani
- Mikael Daez as Lumad
- Gina Alajar as Dian Lamitan
- Lani Mercado as Dal'lang
- Gardo Versoza as Rajah Mangubat
- Raymond Bagatsing as Datu Bugna
- Glaiza de Castro as Bai Binayaan / Yang Tersayang
- Ryan Eigenmann as Angaway
- Rochelle Pangilinan as Bai Marikit
- Irma Adlawan as Bai Mantal
- Ana Capri as Agang
- Roy Alvarez as Awi
- Ayen Munji-Laurel as Hara Lingayan
- Buboy Villar as Banuk
- Sheena Halili as Ahak
- Roxanne Barcelo as Kayang
- Mon Confiado as Songil
- AJ Dee as Paratawag
- Robert Sy as Paragahin
- Mia Pangyarihan as Silay
- Ana Feleo as Bayang

Recurring cast

- Angie Ferro as Uray Hilway
- Maybelline dela Cruz as Baylan Asinas
- Diana Zubiri as Kapid
- Dion Ignacio as Kuling

Guest cast

- Edelweiss Tuzon as younger Amaya
- Byron Ortile as younger Bagani
- Carlo Lacana as teenage Bagani
- Francis Magundayao as teenage Angaway
- Kate Velarde as young Marikit
- Francheska Salcedo as younger Binayaan
- Julian Trono as younger Rajah Mangubat
- Abby Bautista as Alunsina
- Yasmien Kurdi as Apila
- Ronnie Lazaro as Posaka
- Daniel Fernando as Atubang
- Juan Rodrigo as Datu Pulahan
- Leopoldo Wendell Salgado as Banu
- Edgar Manuel as Waba
- Jan Manual as Usbog
- Tanya Garcia as Pandaki
- Aubrey Miles as Magwayen
- Pancho Magno as Agul
- Aljur Abrenica as Dayaw
- Rocco Nacino as older Banuk
- Kris Bernal as older Alunsina
- Dingdong Dantes as Ferdinand Magellan

== Casting ==
In September 2011, Aljur Abrenica, Ronnie Lazaro and Yasmien Kurdi joined the series.

== Production ==
Principal photography commenced in March 2011. Filming concluded in January 2012. The series was extended until January 13, 2012.

A one-hour primer television special, Amaya: The Making of An Epic was aired on May 28, 2011. The show was hosted by Cesar Montano and Miguel Tanfelix, it presented behind the scenes of Amaya from the brainstorming of the management including interviews from Jun Lana and Doctolero, the creative minds behind the story with the guidance of historians from the University of the Philippines.

== Ratings ==
According to AGB Nielsen Philippines' Mega Manila household television ratings, the pilot episode of Amaya earned a 26.2% rating. The final episode scored a 32.7% rating.

== Accolades ==
Accolades received by Amaya
Year	Award	Recipient	Category	Result	Ref.
2011	Anak TV Seal Awards	Amaya	Top 10 Most Favorite TV Programs	Included	
2011	Golden Screen TV Awards	Amaya	Outstanding Original Drama Series	Won	
2011	Golden Screen TV Awards	Marian Rivera	Outstanding Performance by an Actress in a Drama Series	Nominated	
2011	Golden Screen TV Awards	Sid Lucero	Outstanding Performance by an Actor in a Drama Series	Nominated	
2011	Golden Screen TV Awards	Gina Alajar	Outstanding Supporting Actress in a Drama Series	Won	
2011	Golden Screen TV Awards	Lani Mercado	Outstanding Supporting Actress in a Drama Series	Nominated	
2011	Golden Screen TV Awards	Irma Adlawan	Outstanding Supporting Actress in a Drama Series	Nominated	
2011	Golden Screen TV Awards	Gardo Versoza	Outstanding Supporting Actor in a Drama Series	Nominated	
2011	Golden Screen TV Awards	Mikael Daez	Outstanding Breakthrough Performance by an Actor	Nominated	
2011	GMA's Trending 2011	Amaya	Showbiz and the Arts	Rank 3	
2011	Google Zeitgeist	Amaya	Top 10 Most Searched TV Programs	Rank 9	
2011	K-Zone Awards	Amaya	TV show of the Year	Won	
2011	K-Zone Awards	Marian Rivera	Favorite Actress of the Year	Won	
2012	NwSSU Annual Awards	Amaya	Best Primetime Teleserye	Won	
2012	NwSSU Annual Awards	Marian Rivera	Best Actress in a Primetime Teleserye	Won	
2012	26th PMPC Star Awards for Television	Amaya	Best Drama Series	Won	
2012	26th PMPC Star Awards for Television	Rochelle Pangilinan	Best Drama Actress	Nominated	
2013	Golden Screen TV Awards	Amaya	Outstanding Original Drama Series	Nominated	
2013	Golden Screen TV Awards	Marian Rivera	Outstanding Actress in a Drama Series	Won	
2013	Golden Screen TV Awards	Gina Alajar	Outstanding Supporting Actress in a Drama Series	Nominated	
2013	NwSSU Annual Awards	Marian Rivera	Best Actress in a Primetime Teleserye	Won	
