= Sana ay Ikaw na Nga (2012 TV series) =

Philippine television drama series

- Title card
- Also known as: It Might Be You
- Genre: Romantic drama
- Based on: Sana ay Ikaw na Nga (2001) by Gil Tejada Jr.
- Developed by: R.J. Nuevas
- Written by: Abner Tulagan; Leilani Chavez
- Directed by: Roderick A.P. Lindayag
- Creative director: Jun Lana
- Starring: Mikael Daez; Andrea Torres
- Theme music composer: Vehnee Saturno
- Opening theme: "Ikaw na Sana" by Mark Bautista and Rachelle Ann Go
- Country of origin: Philippines
- Original language: Tagalog
- No. of episodes: 115

Production
- Executive producer: Joseph T. Aleta
- Production locations: Manila, Philippines; Laguna; Tagaytay, Philippines
- Cinematography: Patrick Jess Ferrer
- Camera setup: Multiple-camera setup
- Running time: 30–45 minutes
- Production company: GMA Entertainment TV

Original release
- Network: GMA Network
- Release: September 3, 2012 – February 8, 2013

Sana ay Ikaw na Nga (transl. hope it is really you / international title: It Might Be You) is a Philippine television drama romance series broadcast by GMA Network. The series is a remake of a 2001 Philippine television drama series of the same title. Directed by Roderick Lindayag, it stars Mikael Daez and Andrea Torres. It premiered on September 3, 2012, on the network's Afternoon Prime line up. The series concluded on February 8, 2013, with a total of 115 episodes.

The series is streaming online on YouTube.

== Cast and characters ==
=== Lead cast ===
- Andrea Torres as Cecilia Fulgencio / Margarita Trajano

A beautiful and naive young lady. She is also dutiful daughter raised in hardship and strives hard to support her family. Her simple and quiet life turns upside down when she meets the wealthy and handsome Carlos Miguel, with whom she instantly falls in love. She believes that Carlos Miguel is her destiny. Little did she know that her romance with him will be what can lead her to tragedy that would drastically change her entire world.

- Mikael Daez as Carlos Miguel Altamonte

A wealthy, handsome businessman and heir of an established corporation who trapped in an arranged marriage with Olga Villavicer, a daughter of another wealthy businessman. Although he knew from the very beginning that the "marriage" is purposely designed to broaden their business empire, Carlos Miguel has learned to accept his fate and wholeheartedly submitted himself to his family’s selfish desires. However, his life is about to change when he meets Cecilia Fulgencio and discovered the true meaning of the word "love" in her.

=== Supporting cast ===
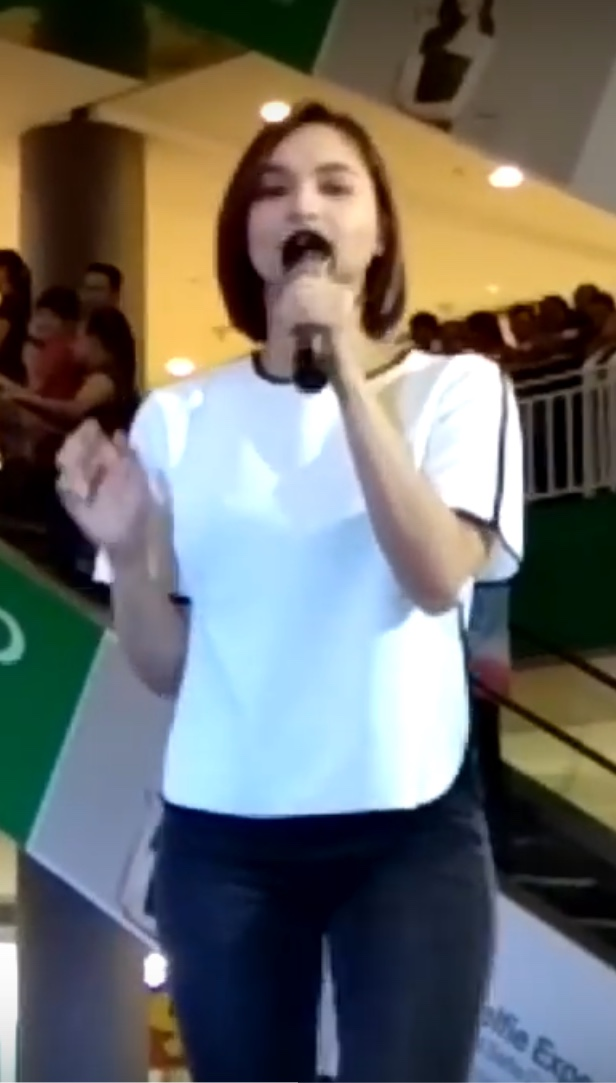
Ryza Cenon portrays Sandra Sebastian.

- Chynna Ortaleza, Andrea Torres and Ryza Cenon as Olga Villavicer / Sandra Sebastian

She grew up in the lap of luxury and is used to being given everything she wants. She is head-over-heels in love with Carlos Miguel and will do everything, even the most impossible things in the world—all for the love of him.

- Gabby Eigenmann as Gilbert Zalameda

Born to a life of privilege, Gilbert is used to having it all, except for one thing – love. Eventually, he will become Cecilia's "knight in shining armor". The one who will save and take care of her in her trying times and her source of strength to avenge those people who made her life a hell and reclaim what is rightfully hers.

- Rita Avila as Mariana Fulgencio

Mariana is the cruel mother of Cecilia. She comes from a dark past that gives her a bitter outlook towards life in general. Her greatest fear is to see her daughter commit the same mistakes she made in the past.

- Jestoni Alarcon as Ricardo Peron

The only man Mariana truly loved and Cecilia's long lost father. He made some hurtful decisions in the past so that despite being blessed with a good life, he feels that there's a big part of his life that's missing.

- Alicia Alonzo as Victoria Altamonte
- Jan Marini as Maria Consuelo Villavicer

A cold-hearted spinster and the greedy, conceited and scheming older sister of Olga. In her ruthless quest for power and wealth, she will drive Olga to pursue her craziness towards Carlos Miguel, to acquire his family's wealth and vast properties. She was later on revealed as the real mother of Olga Villavicer.

- Ynna Asistio as Esmeralda "Esme" Garela

Loud and bubbly, Esmeralda or just simply "Esme" is the best friend and confidante of Cecilia whom she knows she can always depend on when worse comes to worst.

- Marky Lopez as Alvin Guevarra

Friend of Carlos Miguel. A natural comedian, Alvin is nevertheless trustworthy and down-to-earth.

- Jace Flores as Dandoy

Cecilia's avid suitor. Despite being rejected and avoided by Cecilia, he continuously hopes that his love for her will someday be reciprocated.

- Chynna Ortaleza as Dulce

=== Guest cast ===
- Tanya Garcia as Joanna Altamonte
- Maricar de Mesa as Bernadette Zalameda
- Rommel Padilla as Leopold Guerrero
- Dexter Doria as Sofia
- Mel Martinez as Arnold
- Ama Quiambao as a fortune teller
- Irma Adlawan as Libay
- Dex Quindoza as Carding

== Origin ==
Sana ay Ikaw na Nga (transl. Hope It's Really You) was a television series originally created by R.J. Nuevas on GMA Network. The series ran for two years. It premiered on December 3, 2001, and concluded on April 25, 2003.

The original version starred Dingdong Dantes and Tanya Garcia as Carlos Miguel Altamonte and Cecilia Fulgencio/Olga Villavicer respectively. It was under the direction of Gil Tejada Jr.

== Development ==
On August 3, 2012, the network announced that they had decided to remake Sana ay Ikaw na Nga. The same date, the production team introduced the actors that would portray the two main characters, Mikael Daez and Andrea Torres.

While there are many similarities to the original version, many changes were made. Headwriter, RJ Nuevas, whose concept gave birth to the original series, further stated that compare to the original series, the new version's storyline is more matured and daring. "We had to make the story more contemporary. This is a great challenge for all of us. After a decade, one of the most-loved teledramas in Philippine television will be given a different touch that is appropriate for today's times. We’re speeding it up a little bit [because the series is good only for one season] and putting some more interesting twists and turns", he added.

=== Casting ===
Andrea Torres and Mikael Daez were chosen to play Cecilia and Carlos Miguel, respectively. The two are very happy and beyond grateful that their mother studio is trusting them with their own drama series.

Torres underwent several acting workshops as her preparation for her role.

Prior to this project, Torres once got so depressed at work that she even thought of quitting show business. She stated: "There was a point when I asked myself if I really had a future here. I gave myself until age 24 or 25. If nothing happened, I'd start looking in another direction". Until her big break had finally come. "I waited for this for so long! It's a good thing I didn't lose hope or just decided to quit. I'm glad I still believed this would happen to me. And now I’m feeling the pressure. I'm working twice as hard to prove that I deserve it", she added.

== Ratings ==
According to AGB Nielsen Philippines' Mega Manila household television ratings, the pilot episode of Sana ay Ikaw na Nga earned a 16.4% rating. The final episode scored a 22.2% rating.

== Accolades ==
Accolades received by Sana ay Ikaw na Nga
Year	Award	Category	Recipient	Result	Ref.
2012	FMTM Awards	Most Popular Afternoon TV Series	Sana ay Ikaw na Nga	Won	
2012	FMTM Awards	Best Remake/Adaptation Series	Sana ay Ikaw na Nga	Won	
2012	FMTM Awards	Top 10 Best Philippine TV Series	Sana ay Ikaw na Nga	#5	
2012	FMTM Awards	Top 10 Most Promising Actors/Actress of the Year	Andrea Torres Mikael Daez	#7	
2012	FMTM Awards	Top 10 Most Promising Actors/Actress of the Year	Andrea Torres Mikael Daez	#5	
