= Wagas =

Philippine television drama series

- Title card
- Genre: Romantic drama
- Ending theme: "Wagas" by Rachelle Ann Go
- Country of origin: Philippines
- Original language: Tagalog
- No. of episodes: 55

Production
- Executive producer: Richelle Pancho-Ramirez
- Camera setup: Multiple-camera setup
- Running time: 26–44 minutes
- Production company: GMA News and Public Affairs

Original release
- Network: GMA News TV; GMA Network
- Release: February 9, 2013 – November 15, 2019

Wagas (transl. pure) is a Philippine television drama romance anthology series broadcast by GMA News TV and GMA Network. It premiered on GMA News TV on February 9, 2013. The series aired its final episode on GMA News TV on May 25, 2019. It moved to GMA Network on September 2, 2019 on the network's morning line up. The series concluded on GMA Network on November 15, 2019, with a total of 55 episodes.

The series is streaming online on YouTube.

== Cast and characters ==
Cast

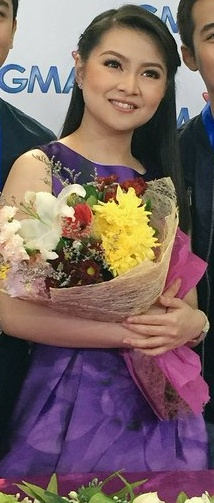
Barbie Forteza

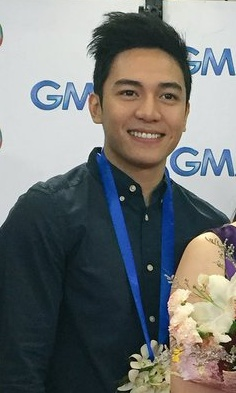
Jak Roberto

=== Throwback Pag-Ibig ===
Lead cast

- Sunshine Dizon as July Aguilar
- Mike Tan as Ryan Aguilar
- Leanne Bautista as Chloe Liam / Smile Aguilar

Supporting cast

- Regine Angeles as Amor
- Angelica Ulip as Chelsie
- Joel Palencia as Eric
- Lovely Abella as Kristine
- Jason Dewey as Hilton
- Angelina Kanapi as Sara
- Iyah Mina as Ru
- Rob Sy as Mario
- Gigi Locsin as Susing
- Antonette Garcia as Margaux

=== Wait Lang Is This Love? ===
Lead cast

- Barbie Forteza as Mayumi "Yummy" Bubuyog
- Jak Roberto as Eugene Bitao
- Kristoffer Martin as Cedrick Dacanay

Supporting cast

- Yayo Aguila as Glorious "Gloria" Bubuyog
- Tina Paner as Sonya Bubuyog
- Rey "PJ" Abellana as Rex Dacanay
- Ayra Mariano as Bane
- Ashley Ortega as Sandy
- Jun Sabayton as Andres
- Mico Aytona as Eugene
- Chrome Prince Cosio as Salazar

Guest cast

- Bianca Umali as Monica
- Migo Adecer as Waldo
- Ana Roces as Rosemary

== Episodes ==
=== Throwback Pag-Ibig ===
Episodes of Throwback Pag-Ibig
No. overall	No. in season	Title	Directed by	Original release date	Viewers (millions)
1	1	"Pilot"	Adolf Alix Jr.	September 2, 2019	4.0%
2	2	"Reunited"	Adolf Alix Jr.	September 3, 2019	3.9%
3	3	"Bahay-Bahayan" (transl. playhouse)	Adolf Alix Jr.	September 4, 2019	3.5%
4	4	"Tabi-tabi Tayo" (transl. beside each other)	Adolf Alix Jr.	September 5, 2019	3.0%
5	5	"Agawan" (transl. getting)	Adolf Alix Jr.	September 6, 2019	
6	6	"Para kay Smile" (transl. for smile)	Adolf Alix Jr.	September 9, 2019	3.5%
7	7	"Love Story"	Adolf Alix Jr.	September 10, 2019	3.6%
8	8	"I'm Sorry"	Adolf Alix Jr.	September 11, 2019	3.1%
9	9	"Episode 9"	Adolf Alix Jr.	September 12, 2019	3.5%
10	10	"Episode 10"	Adolf Alix Jr.	September 13, 2019	3.6%
11	11	"Episode 11"	Adolf Alix Jr.	September 16, 2019	3.6%
12	12	"Episode 12"	Adolf Alix Jr.	September 17, 2019	3.5%
13	13	"Episode 13"	Adolf Alix Jr.	September 18, 2019	3.9%
14	14	"Episode 14"	Adolf Alix Jr.	September 19, 2019	3.5%
15	15	"Episode 15"	Adolf Alix Jr.	September 20, 2019	4%
16	16	"Episode 16"	Adolf Alix Jr.	September 23, 2019	
17	17	"Episode 17"	Adolf Alix Jr.	September 24, 2019	
18	18	"Episode 18"	Adolf Alix Jr.	September 25, 2019	
19	19	"Episode 19"	Adolf Alix Jr.	September 26, 2019	
20	20	"Finale"	Adolf Alix Jr.	September 27, 2019	

=== Wait Lang Is This Love ===
Episodes of Wait Lang Is This Love?
No. overall	No. in season	Title	Directed by	Original release date
21	1	"JakBie"	Rember Gelera	September 30, 2019
22	2	"Yummy is Shookt"	Rember Gelera	October 1, 2019
23	3	"First Hug"	Rember Gelera	October 2, 2019
24	4	"K-Pop Pares"	Rember Gelera	October 3, 2019
25	5	"First Date"	Rember Gelera	October 4, 2019
26	6	"OMG"	Rember Gelera	October 7, 2019
27	7	"Ganda Ko" (transl. I'm beautiful)	Rember Gelera	October 8, 2019
28	8	"Secret Natin 'To" (transl. it's our secret)	Rember Gelera	October 9, 2019
29	9	"Paligaw Naman" (transl. swoon me)	Rember Gelera	October 10, 2019
30	10	"Huli Ka" (transl. I caught you)	Rember Gelera	October 11, 2019
31	11	"Ang Sakit" (transl. it is painful)	Rember Gelera	October 14, 2019
32	12	"Alam Na" (transl. I know it)	Rember Gelera	October 15, 2019
33	13	"Episode 13"	Rember Gelera	October 16, 2019
34	14	"Episode 14"	Rember Gelera	October 17, 2019
35	15	"Mahal Kita" (transl. I love you)	Rember Gelera	October 18, 2019
36	16	"Episode 16"	Rember Gelera	October 21, 2019
37	17	"Episode 17"	Rember Gelera	October 22, 2019
38	18	"Episode 18"	Rember Gelera	October 23, 2019
39	19	"Episode 19"	Rember Gelera	October 24, 2019
40	20	"Episode 20"	Rember Gelera	October 25, 2019
41	21	"Episode 21"	Rember Gelera	October 28, 2019
42	22	"Episode 22"	Rember Gelera	October 29, 2019
43	23	"Episode 23"	Rember Gelera	October 30, 2019
44	24	"Episode 24"	Rember Gelera	October 31, 2019
45	25	"Episode 25"	Rember Gelera	November 1, 2019
46	26	"Episode 26"	Rember Gelera	November 4, 2019
47	27	"Episode 27"	Rember Gelera	November 5, 2019
48	28	"Episode 28"	Rember Gelera	November 6, 2019
49	29	"Episode 29"	Rember Gelera	November 7, 2019
50	30	"Episode 30"	Rember Gelera	November 8, 2019
51	31	"Episode 31"	Rember Gelera	November 11, 2019
52	32	"Episode 32"	Rember Gelera	November 12, 2019
53	33	"Episode 33"	Rember Gelera	November 13, 2019
54	34	"Episode 34"	Rember Gelera	November 14, 2019
55	35	"Finale"	Rember Gelera	November 15, 2019

== Accolades ==
Accolades received by Wagas
Year	Award	Category	Recipient	Result	Ref.
2014	Golden Screen TV Awards	Outstanding Performance by an Actor in a Single Drama/Telemovie Program	Sid Lucero ("Walang Imposible sa Pag-ibig")	Nominated	
2014	Golden Screen TV Awards	Outstanding Performance by an Actress in a Single Drama/Telemovie Program	Julia Clarete ("The Charee and Chesco Love Story")	Nominated	
2014	Golden Screen TV Awards	Outstanding Single Drama/Telemovie Program	"Odd Couple or Perfect Couple"	Nominated	
2015	29th PMPC Star Awards for Television	Best Drama Anthology	Wagas	Nominated	
2016	30th PMPC Star Awards for Television	Best Drama Anthology	Wagas	Nominated	
2016	US International Film and Video Festival	Certificates for Creative Excellence (Docudrama category)	“Gabriela and Diego Silang Love Story”	Won	
2017	31st PMPC Star Awards for Television	Best Drama Anthology	Wagas	Nominated	
2018	32nd PMPC Star Awards for Television	Best Drama Anthology	Wagas	Nominated	
2019	Anak TV Seal Awards		Wagas	Won	
2019	33rd PMPC Star Awards for Television	Best Drama Anthology	Wagas	Nominated	
2021	34th PMPC Star Awards for Television	Best Drama Anthology	Wagas	Nominated	
2023	35th PMPC Star Awards for Television	Best Drama Anthology	Wagas	Nominated	
