= Kunwari... Mahal Kita =

2023 Filipino film by Roderick Lindayag

Kunwari Mahal Kita
- Promotional poster
- Directed by: Roderick Lindayag
- Screenplay by: Afi Africa; Maia Corrine Besmar; Roderick Lindayag
- Produced by: Vincent Del Rosario III; Veronique Del Rosario-Corpus; Edmund Mijares
- Starring: Joseph Marco; Nathalie Hart; Ryza Cenon
- Cinematography: Eli Balce; Julius Palomo Villanueva
- Edited by: Tara Illenberger
- Music by: Vincent De Jesus
- Production company: Viva Films
- Release date: March 15, 2023
- Country: Philippines
- Language: Filipino

Kunwari Mahal Kita is a 2023 Philippine romantic drama film written and directed by Roderick Lindayag. Produced and distributed by Viva Films, it features Joseph Marco, Nathalie Hart and Ryza Cenon. The film was released theatrically on March 15, 2023. The film was reviewed by Fred Hawson for ABS-CBN.

== Cast ==
- Joseph Marco as Greg, ex-husband of Cindy
- Nathalie Hart as Cindy, ex-wife of Greg
- Ryza Cenon as Hydes
- Yayo Aguila
- Thou Reyes
- Joshua Colet
- Eslove Briones
- Charlize Paras
- Jerico Zuñiga

== Production ==
The film was announced by Viva Films. Joseph Marco, Nathalie Hart and Ryza Cenon was cast to appear in the film. The principal photography of the film commenced in 2019 in Bataan and Pangasinan.
