= Mayton Eugenio =

Filipina commercial model, actress and dancer

- Born: September 14, 1992 (age 33); Quezon City, Philippines
- Occupations: Actress, teen star, dancer, model
- Years active: 2005–present
- Agents: GMA Artist Center (2005–2016); Viva Artists Agency (2016–present)

Mayton Eugenio (born September 14, 1992) is a Filipina commercial model, actress and dancer.

She is well known as the daughter of veteran choreographer and one of the Philippines' famous dance icons, Geleen Eugenio, and has been cast in various roles such as Weng Dimagiba in the horror-thriller series Dormitoryo in GMA Network.

In 2015, Eugenio finished her culinary course at the Center for Asian Culinary Studies, under Café Ysabel.

In 2016, she signed a contract with Viva Artists Agency.

== Filmography ==
=== Film ===
Year	Title	Role
2013	Kaleidoscope World	Dani
2017	100 Tula Para Kay Stella	Danica
2019	Indak	Abbie
2019	Miracle in Cell No. 7	Teacher Marilou
2022	Sisid	Blessie

=== Television ===
Year	Title	Role
2010–2013	Party Pilipinas	Herself
2011	Time of My Life	Amera
2012	One True Love	Iza
2012–2013	Magdalena: Anghel sa Putikan	Dessa
2013	Magpakailanman: Batang Ina	Mila
2013	Dormitoryo	Weng Dimagiba
2013–2015	Sunday All Stars	Herself
2014	Seasons of Love Presents: I Do, I Don't	Kirsten
2014–2015	More Than Words	Chelsea de Silva
2015	Maynila: Love by Blood	Roxanne
2015	Magpakailanman: Hakbang Tungo sa Pangarap	Eden
2015	Buena Familia	Lauren Villacorta
2016	That's My Amboy	Melissa "Issa" Carreon
2016	Wish I May	Paula
2016	Magpakailanman: The Rape Video Scandal	Tintin
2016	The Millionaire's Wife	Selena Buenaluz
2016–present	ASAP	Herself / Performer
2016–present	Pinoy Box Office	Herself / Movie Jock
2018	Tadhana: Kamao	Ayo
2020	Maalaala Mo Kaya: Posas	Karen's friend
2023	Minsan pa Nating Hagkan ang Nakaraan	Krizzy Vidal
