= Los Bastardos =

2018–19 Philippine television drama series

- Title card
- Also known as: Precious Hearts Romances Presents: Los Bastardos
- Genre: Family drama; Romance; Mystery; Thriller; Action; Crime; Revenge
- Created by: Carmela L. Abaygar
- Based on: Cardinal Bastards by Vanessa
- Written by: Genesis Rodriguez; Bridgette Ann Rebuca; Margarette Labrador; Carol Navarro; Jones Castro; Kay Conlu-Brondial
- Directed by: Raymond B. Ocampo; Carlo Po Artilliaga; Mitch Valdes; Digo Ricio; Ludwig Peralta; Roderick P. Lindayag; Catherine O. Camarillo; Ethan Pugiotto
- Starring: Ronaldo Valdez; Jake Cuenca; Marco Gumabao; Albie Casiño; Joshua Colet; Joseph Marco; Diego Loyzaga; Gloria Diaz
- Country of origin: Philippines
- Original language: Filipino
- No. of seasons: 3
- No. of episodes: 247 (list of episodes)

Production
- Executive producers: Carlo Katigbak; Cory Vidanes; Laurenti Dyogi; Ruel Bayani
- Producers: Maru R. Benitez; Louver Asuncion-Galarrira
- Production locations: Metro Manila, Philippines; Zambales, Philippines; Negros Occidental, Philippines; Rizal, Philippines
- Editors: Shyra Marie Joaquin; Godwin Lucena; Ray Ann Kristelle Endaya; Ronald Aguila
- Running time: 25–36 minutes
- Production company: RSB Scripted Format

Original release
- Network: ABS-CBN
- Release: October 15, 2018 – September 27, 2019

Related
- Precious Hearts Romances Presents: Araw Gabi

Los Bastardos (lit. 'The Bastards') is a Philippine television drama series broadcast by ABS-CBN. The series is based on the Filipino pocket book novel Cardinal Bastards by Vanessa, the series is the twentieth and final installment of Precious Hearts Romances Presents. Directed by Raymond B. Ocampo, Carlo Po Artilliaga, Mitch Valdes, Digo Ricio, Ludwig Peralta, Roderick P. Lindayag, Catherine O. Camarillo and Ethan Pugiotto, it stars Ronaldo Valdez, Jake Cuenca, Marco Gumabao, Albie Casiño, Joshua Colet, Joseph Marco (seasons 2-3), Diego Loyzaga (season 1), and Gloria Diaz. It aired on the network's Kapamilya Gold line up and worldwide on TFC from October 15, 2018 to September 27, 2019. The series was inspired by Fyodor Dostoevsky's The Brothers Karamazov.

== Plot ==
=== Book One ===
Los Bastardos is based on the Cardinal Bastards series of Precious Hearts Romances Presents. The story follows the lives of five brothers struggling with one another for their rightful place in their father's heart. The root of their conflict stems from betrayals and secrets surrounding the individuals surrounding Don Roman Cardinal.

Don Roman is the illegitimate son of Don Ismael Cardinal, a wealthy sugar cane plantation owner of the fictitious region of Victorino in the rural outskirts of Manila, Philippines. He reunites with his father as an adult, eventually inherits his father's hacienda and starts a life with his small family when tragedy strikes and he loses his wife Soledad and son, Roman Jr.

Despite the tragedy, Don Roman pursues their dreams to expand and diversify the Hacienda and build a liquor distillery using ingredients from his sugar cane produce.

Throughout his life, Don Roman builds a successful empire and sires five sons from four different women. All his sons inherit his physique, tenacity, physical strength and astuteness that serves them well in their respective fields, but two sons do not benefit from his kindness because of the family environment they grow up in.

Roman Jr, later known as Isagani, is Don Roman's legitimate firstborn son with his wife Soledad, his true love. Don Roman and the town folks fear his young family perished in the mudslide. Soledad slips him into a passing produce truck. She pins her wedding ring on his shirt praying it would lead him to his father someday, but she fails to get on the truck as it picks up speed to escape the oncoming mudslide. The child is raised by the farmers who discover the infant in their truck. Isagani Esperanza inherits his father's good qualities of kindness, compassion and bravery, as well as his father's physical strength, entrepreneurship and unique taste buds, essential for developing fine brandy. He formulates an arrack he calls Coco Brandy, when he was a student in Manila. Isagani buys a small coconut farm to set up his own distillery. He has the opportunity to realize his dreams when he is sought after by two major distilleries to partner with: the Cardinals and Silverios. Isagani chooses to partner up with the Cardinals because he admires Roman's kindness and fairness. A bond forms between Roman and Isagani though neither are aware of their kinship.

Joaquin is Alba Santillan's son. Alba is a spoiled heiress obsessed with Roman but fails to win his affection. She gets rid of Soledad and her infant by pushing them off the cliff. While grieving for Soledad, she seduces him one night and then tells him she is pregnant with his second son, Joaquin. In truth, she is already pregnant by her parents' gardener, Enrico. Roman loves the infant like his firstborn, and brings Alba and their son to live in his estate where he is raised as Roman's natural son. He never marries Alba but allows her to live as the mistress of the mansion for the sake of their son. Among the five brothers, Joaquin is the only son who grows up under his care. Joaquin has a strong and loving relationship with his father and inherits his father's fairness and kindness. Joaquin does not have the malevolent and selfish traits of his mother. He grows up to lead the management team of Cardinal Distillery, loved by all. Alba tries her best to poison Joaquin's mind against Isagani, but Joaquin's innate goodness prevails and he decides not to listen to his mother. He leaves for America to sort out his feelings, but tragedy struck when Joaquin died in a plane crash on ill-fated flight of LAKAN AIRLINES LAK271 or Flight 271 on his return. Alba's liaisons with the gardener is revealed at his memorial services. Despite the revelation Roman mourns Joaquin's passing and sends Alba away.

Matteo is Maddie Asuncion-Silverio's son. Maddie is the emotionally abused socialite wife of Menandro Silverio and sole heiress of the Asuncion fortune. Drawn to the lonely Don Roman, their affair produces a son, Matteo, but she ends their relationship and raises the child as a Silverio, business rivals of the Cardinals; Aware of his wife's and Roman's betrayal, Menandro uses Matteo as his secret pawn for revenge against them. He raises the child to fear him, devoid of character and moral values, encourage his greed and teaches him to despise the Cardinals. Matteo yearns for his father's approval but never gets it as his father is abusive to his children and wife. Matteo grows up in a household filled with cruelty, hatred, and fear.

Connor is Pilar's son, Roman's childhood friend who became a prostitute. Roman tries to save her from this life, and in their loneliness, they have a relationship. When Alba learns that Pilar is pregnant with Connor, Alba confronts her, and successfully taunts Pilar into leaving Roman for a wealthy client in Japan. Disillusioned with her life, she takes her pain out on Connor and abuses him. She tries to sell him to a stranger for sex but is rescued by Fausto, a con artist, who raises Connor along the same path. The trauma of his mother's rejection changes Connor, his longing for a family is replaced with hatred towards his father who he believes abandoned him.

And finally there is Lucas, Sita's son. Sita is an orphan raised in the Santillan household. She grows up as Alba's personal maid and witnesses Alba's duplicitous actions to ensnare Roman. In love with Roman herself, they have a brief affair and produce Lucas. When Alba discovers their relationship, she threatens to take Joaquin away. As a concession, Roman agrees not to acknowledge Lucas as his natural son but is firm that Lucas and his mother live in the estate where Lucas is raised as companion to his son Joaquin. As a result, Lucas grows up in the Cardinal household, treated like family but never knowing the man he serves is his own father. Roman loves Lucas and treats him with respect. He also teaches Joaquin to treat Lucas like a younger brother. Lucas inherits his father's leadership skills, and his mother's patience and gentle nature. He later learns about his paternity, and though conflicted at first, steps into his role as a Cardinal with strength and grace and serves his father well.

Ultimately, the five brothers’ lives collide as they learn who their true father is.

Connor is the first son to discover his father's identity. Renowned in the criminal underworld as the best con artist, he makes it his personal mission to bring his father down, believing his mother's lies that Don Roman abandoned them. He ingratiates himself with Isagani and Lucas to get close to Don Roman. Isagani and Lucas expose his dubious activities prompting Connor to admit his true identity, but surprisingly, he gains the protection of Roman Cardinal, who is more than happy to reconcile with his son. Connor bides his time to win his father's trust. His ulterior motive is to gain access to all of the Cardinals’ bank accounts, which he intends to transfer to his secret account. But his agenda changes after several attempts fail. He softens towards his father as he learns to trust and believe his father's unconditional love and acceptance of Connor, who always wanted a family to belong to.

Matteo, motivated at first to please his father Menandro, learns the truth that Roman is his real father. His keen astuteness allows him to swiftly figure out Menandro's real agenda. Furious over Menandro's treachery, he promptly strips him of his power and takes over the Silverio machinery, when he becomes the sole beneficiary of his mother's wealth. His hatred for Menandro equals his hatred for Don Roman, who he blames is the root of his miserable life. He plans to destroy him and take over the Cardinal empire.

Soon after Roman learns about his three sons, he discovers that his lost first born son, Roman Jr., is Isagani Esperanza. The news is welcomed by Lucas but not by Matteo and Connor who realize Isagani is the legitimate son and another barrier to their evil plans.

Although they come from different worlds, the discovery that they are siblings affects each of the sons who carry the baggage of their fatherless youths.

Unlike Isagani and Lucas who embrace their kinship, Connor and Matteo blame their miserable lives on their father.

But as Roman attempts to reunite his sons, the greedy and vengeful individuals in his life make sure he fails: Menandro Silverio is determined to use Matteo to destroy him; and Roman's two former lovers - Alba and Pilar are equally set on seizing the Cardinal wealth.

=== Book Two ===
While Don Roman tries to get his four sons to reconcile, a wealthy young man in Los Angeles is preparing for a trip to the Philippines. Lorenzo Cuevas wants to destroy Roman Cardinal too. He is Don Roman's second son with Soledad.

Flashback to a few years ago, his adoptive father reveals to him on his deathbed the truth that his real father is Don Roman Cardinal, the powerful ’’Hacendero’’ (landlord) of the Cardinal Plantation and Cardinal Distillery. Don Pablo Cuevas tells Lorenzo of coming across Soledad a few days after typhoons and mudslides devastate the southern region of the Philippines, wandering the countryside, distraught, disheveled, with no memory of who she is or where she comes from. A few weeks pregnant, she suffers bruises and serious injuries sustained from a violent assault. He cares for her and search for her family but initially, no information surfaces.

Suffering from memory loss as a result of her traumatic escape, unaware of the full facts about Alba's attempts on her life, Don Pablo Cuevas assumes she is running away from an abusive relationship. Upon investigating further, he traces her former husband to the powerful hacendero (or Hacienda owner, plantation owner) Don Roman Cardinal, who by now is living with a new family (Alba and a their infant son). Believing she is in danger and seeking to protect her, he takes the pregnant Soledad away from the Philippines and they move to California to start a new life. He renames her Consuelo and gives her and Lorenzo his surname. Consuelo recovers from her physical injuries, but her memory of her life with Don Roman and her first born son remains buried. Lorenzo believes Don Pablo Cuevas' story about Don Roman's abusive treatment towards his mother and seeks to avenge her.

He conducts an investigation of the Cardinals and learns about his four other brothers. He arrives in the Philippines and arranges to meet his father and his brothers under the pretext of a business partnership with his own multinational hotel and resort corporation. He ingratiates himself with them through his previous business deals with Joaquin while the latter was in America.

Meanwhile, in Los Angeles, Soledad decides to return to the Philippines to join her son. As she arrives in Victorino, the scenic drive down the countryside gives her a sense that it was a part of her past. Unknown to all including herself, Consuelo Cuevas is the true matriarch of the Cardinals. Soledad Cardinal returns to Victorino.

Inside the Silverios' crumbling empire, Matteo decides to use his sister Dulce to get Lorenzo to partner with them. Lorenzo, on the other hand, uses Dulce to undermine Isagani, to make it easier for him to destroy his siblings and ultimately Roman.

As Consuelo gets acquainted with Victorino and San Jovita, she is inexplicably surprised by its familiarity and happy with the peacefulness and beauty of its surroundings. She tells Lorenzo that she sees herself retiring there. She meets new friends and discovers a Nipa hut which she finds vaguely familiar. The caretaker tells her it is uninhabited but maintained by Don Roman Cardinal, a name that doesn't mean anything to her yet.

In the meantime, Connor begins to self destruct. Drowning in his anger towards his father and jealous of his brothers' better stations in life, he drives himself into a downward spiral. In a drunken stupor, he attempts to rape Isay who is on her way home, but his partner Lupita intercepts him, renders him unconscious, and forcibly removes him from the site. Isagani finds her on the roadside and as he tries to get help, Matteo drives by and side swipes him off the ravine. This is how Consuelo Cuevas, on her way home from a day of sightseeing, finds him. Alarmed at his condition, she instructs her driver to pick him up and brings him to the Cuevas resort to be treated.

News of the unconscious man rescued by Consuelo reach the Esperanzas who rush to the Ashton Resort, overjoyed to see Isagani. Consuelo remembers Irma from the Carinderia (Filipino term for a roadside cafeteria) where she enjoyed a Ginata-án, a visit stirring pleasant yet still unknown memories.

Alba is busy planning to get rid of Soledad again. She kills Enrico whose extortion attempts were distracting her, and joins forces with Menandro and Pilar, who share the same goal to destroy the Cardinals and steal their wealth.

Meanwhile, Consuelo's and the Cardinals’ worlds become smaller as their orbits grow closer. She is equally puzzled over her overwhelming emotions when Isagani shows her a photograph of Don Roman.

Certain that Consuelo would come face to face with Don Roman soon, Lorenzo steps up his plans for revenge. He rejects the business merger with the Cardinals and join forces with the Silverios.

Meanwhile, Consuelo seeks the help of specialists in Manila, certain her dreams are related to her past.

Alba's mental illness declines further, plagued by nightmares of Enrico and other heinous crimes she committed. Isagani witnesses her hallucinating a conversation with Joaquin, as she confesses of Enrico's murder.

Meanwhile, Roman is trying to piece things together, determined to get answers as to why Lorenzo is bent on keeping Consuelo away from the Cardinalsas. When he catches up to the woman interested in Soledad's Bahay Kubo, he is shocked when he recognizes Soledad. He tries to catch up with her at the Resort, where he is first denied entry. Searching every room in the resort, he finds her photograph with Lorenzo, and recognizes Soledad, his long lost wife. As Lorenzo and Isagani follow after him, Lorenzo reveals the truth that he is Soledad's second son, and that his adoptive father told him that his real father is Don Roman Cardinal, the abusive husband of Soledad Cardinal, who thought he killed her and then quickly took another woman and son to live with him

While Don Roman tells him the real truth, he receives a call from Alba who has Soledad as hostage. Alba wants Roman to find her so she can kill him. Soledad tries to escape from Alba when she recognizes Alba as the woman who tried to kill her and her infant son decades back. She knocks down Alba with a large dead branch and renders her unconscious.

Meanwhile, Roman and his two sons reach Alba's home and find Soledad. She immediately recognizes Don Roman and they are reunited. Alba awakens from her unconsciousness but loses her balance, falls off the cliff and is impaled on a dead tree trunk.

Reunited at last, Soledad and Lorenzo move into the mansion, and the brothers make an effort to adapt to the new family dynamics. Soledad accepts Roman's illegitimate sons and plans to get them together as a family. But their first family dinner is a disaster when Lorenzo and Matteo comes to blows after Lorenzo terminates their business partnership.

Meanwhile, Gigi who is still reeling from Matteo's rejection, joins forces with Menandro to bring down the Cardinals and ultimately take revenge on Matteo. Gigi runs the illegal gambling den and leads the hardcore criminals and the underworld.

Soon after the family dinner, Lorenzo hosts an Ashton Resorts' grand opening with members of the business and social community attending, everyone except Matteo. Unfazed, Matteo hires an assassin to bomb the resort to create chaos and mayhem. His instructions were to plant the bomb outside the building, ensuring no one gets hurt.

Menandro takes this opportunity to derail Matteo. He overrides Matteo's instructions and pays the bomber-assassin to shed blood, maim the victims and then point the blame on Matteo.

That evening, Matteo arrives at the resort, gleefully anticipating to witness the commotion caused by the bomb. He catches the bomber on his way out and realizes the bomber planted the weapon inside. Matteo rushes in and tries to warn people away but it is too late for many guests, especially Sita.

While everyone enjoys the festivities, Sita notices a man leaving hastily and as she tries to get closer to him, notices a glowing contraption he left in a flower bush. At the same time she sees Matteo from the upstairs window waving her away and realizes the presence of a bomb near her. Though she tries to run away to warn everyone, it detonates, hitting her with shrapnel and knocks her down.

Sita dies soon after she is rushed to the hospital, but not before she is able to speak to Roman and Soledad, entrusting Lucas to them. She also gets to say goodbye to Lucas, who is devastated. Her death changes Lucas.

Although the police are gathering evidences surrounding the bombing, Lorenzo and Connor suspect Matteo is involved so they investigate on their own. Lucas also suspects Matteo since he saw him at the resort. To avenge his mother's death, Lucas joins the criminal underworld of Gigi where he learns how to fight. Lucas successfully captures Matteo, tortures him in an abandoned mine and plants a bomb and detonating device to kill him. As his siblings find him, Matteo accidentally trips the detonator and a large explosion seals the cave entrance. He escapes and leaves his siblings trapped inside. They are rescued by Connor.

Fully recovered, it's business as usual for Lorenzo who takes over the Silverio Distillery angering Menandro and kicks him out.

Lucas, meanwhile, tormented over his mother's death, succumbs to Gigi and her dark criminal world. Lucas turns his back against his family.

Elsewhere, Matteo is in danger as the Silverio mansion is set on fire by Menandro and Pilar. Don Roman orders Lorenzo and Connor to rescue Matteo.

Don Roman and Soledad, decide to take Matteo into their home. He pretends to get into their good graces but continues his sinister plans to destroy the Cardinals.

Meanwhile, Isagani asks Connor to help him infiltrate Gigi's gambling den where Lucas is. Isagani enters the gambling den and confronts Lucas, but gets a brutal beating by Lucas before escaping the premises. Don Roman decides to call the authorities with Matteo's assistance and Gigi is captured.

While attempting to rescue Lucas, Don Roman is shot, damaging his liver. It turns out Lucas is the only match for Roman's liver transplant.

Gigi is shot and killed by a mysterious assassin in the presence of Lupita and Fausto. Lucas, Fausto and Lupita flee the scene. Menandro and Pilar discuss the shooting but are unaware who did it. The mysterious shooter turns out to be Catalina Silverio's henchmen. Catalina is Menandro's lost sister, also seeking revenge against Don Roman.

Matteo attempts to kill Soledad but is foiled by his siblings. Matteo escapes to hide in an old Silverio vacation home to regroup and recuperate from his injuries.

In the midst of all the conflict, Isagani proposes to Isay who accepts.

Lucas vows to change and rejoin the family and also donates part of his liver to save Roman.

=== Book Three ===
A new enemy emerges: Doña Catalina Silverio Pacheco. Her father was one of the bandits who ambushed Roman and Soledad early on, was sent to prison for it and later killed in a prison brawl. Her father's death leaves her and older brother Menando Silverio orphans. Menandro sells her to Eduardo Pacheco, a wealthy criminal boss, who marries and abuses Catalina. She loses her child, but poisons him and inherits all his wealth upon his demise. She blames Soledad and Roman Cardinal for her misery.

When Menandro fails to destroy the Cardinals, Catalina takes over, arriving with her army of female assassins.

Although Lorenzo and Lucas want Matteo to pay for his crimes, Don Roman wants to give him a chance to return into their fold. Hence, the brothers continue to search for Matteo with mixed feelings.

Meanwhile, we learn that Dulce is the infant taken from Catalina by her husband and given to Menandro to kill. Unable to kill his infant niece, Menandro legally adopts her as a Silverio.

Catalina locates and ingratiates herself to Dulce, gains her trust, and uses her as a pawn in her revenge plan. She easily manipulates Dulce to turn against the Cardinals. Jealous of Isay and Isagani's happiness and upcoming engagement, Catalina pushes Dulce to separate the young lovers. Dulce urges Matteo to gate crash Isagani and Isay's 'Pamanhikan', an engagement dinner when the bridegroom's parents ask for her hand.

At the Engagement dinner, Matteo arrives and announces that Connor was Isay's rape assailant. Furious that Isay was placed in peril, Nante believes that Isagani covered it up to protect his brother. Nante calls off the engagement, instructing Isay to cut ties with the Cardinals, and files attempted rape charges against Connor and obstruction of justice against Isagani. The relationship between Isay's father and the Cardinals and Esperanzas quickly deteriorates. The wedding plans are canceled.

Don Roman banishes Matteo. As a result, the brothers gather all their evidence and file multiple charges against Matteo who is arrested and incarcerated.

While the Fiscal office finds Nante's charges against the Cardinal brothers without merit, Nante plans to take Isay to Catbalogan. Meanwhile, Catalina befriends Soledad and Roman and manipulates Dulce, now estranged from the Cardinals. Her toxic influence quickly transforms Dulce from a good doctor into an enemy of the Cardinals.

Unaware of Dulce's duplicity, Isay turns to her trusted friend, who urges her to choose her father. To Dulce's frustration, Isagani refuses to give up on their love, convincing Isay to elope, have a church wedding and then face Nante's ire together. Isay confides in Dulce, who wastes no time warning Nante, foiling their marriage plans once again.

Back in jail, Matteo enacts a fake attempt on his life following a plan hatched by Catalina and Dulce, to get him confined into a mental institution where Catalina is a major benefactress and can control the environment.

Elsewhere at the resort, Diane gets wasted after being stood up on her blind date. Three men try to take advantage of her inebriation, but Lorenzo rescues her from their aggressive advances and has security kick them off the premises. As he tries to knock some sense into Diane, they become intimate and end up sleeping together. This affects their working relationship soon after as both are confused and awkward with each other. Lorenzo tries to admit his real feelings but is confused about it.

Meantime, Nante has a change of heart when an attempt is made on Isay's life by Catalina's assassin. He witnesses the Cardinals risk their own lives to rescue his daughter. Nante gives his blessings for their wedding.

Meanwhile, Don Roman is shocked to see Matteo's deteriorating mental state and tries to have him transferred. Unknown to everyone, Matteo is being slowly drugged with powerful psychotic drugs by medical staff under Catalina's orders.

By this time, Catalina's unusual interest in Soledad and Roman arouse their sons' suspicions. The Cardinals uncover the connection between Menandro and Catalina, and confirm she is the shadowy Señora referred to by criminals. Lucas also overhears Menandro boasting that the bomb exploding inside the resort that killed his mother, was his idea - "Matteo simply wanted to scare, but I wanted to maim and kill." Isagani also discovers that Catalina has been visiting Matteo in the mental facility on several occasions. When Don Roman tries to have him transferred, Dulce refuses and instead demands the Cardinals to stay away from Matteo, threatening a restraining order.

Dulce's transformation from a kind, and compassionate doctor into a jealous and unreasonably scorned woman, is complete. She tries to poison Isay and almost kills Isagani. Distraught, she calls Catalina who reveals that she is her mother. From this point, Dulce blindly obeys her mother.

Earlier at Catalina's island, Señora advises Lupita and Fausto that they cannot leave until they complete their next assignment. Lupita wants out but Catalina holds Fausto hostage. Catalina recognizes Lupita's superior skills and intends to gain her loyalties so she can serve as her eyes and ears in Menandro's gambling world. Lupita plays along.

Meanwhile, the Cardinal brothers obtain evidence of Catalina's shadowy world and her using Matteo's mental illness to harm the Cardinals. Connor also discovers Lupita in Menandro's illegal gambling den. She helps him escape and tries to convince her to escape with him but she won't abandon Fausto. The Cardinals hatch a plan to capture Catalina and Menandro, and rescue Lupita and Fausto.

Knowing her cover is blown after an acrimonious heart to heart between Soledad and Catalina turns ugly, lines are drawn. Catalina arranges for Matteo to leave the facility and calls Dulce, Matteo and Menandro to her secret base in Santa Jovita where she reads them the riot act on the final destruction the Cardinals. She is unaware that Soledad has her sons following Menandro, Dulce and Matteo, and the four brothers witness the meeting.

Dulce tries one last time to win Isagani back and fails. As planned, the Cardinals follow her as she unsuspectingly leads them to the Silverios' new gambling den. Carolina comforts the distraught and near-hysterical Dulce. Isay is saddened over Dulce's deception. The Cardinals have the gambling den raided and closed, effectively shutting off Catalina's main source of cash liquidity. The Silverios go into hiding.

While a nationwide search is conducted by the police, the Cardinal wedding ceremony goes without incident, although the brothers intercept a sniper assassin hired by Menandro to massacre the bride and groom and as many guests as possible. The couple learn about the attempt after they return from their honeymoon. Connor was alerted by Lupita who is determined to protect Connor and the Cardinals.

The Cardinals continue to pursue the Silverios, gathering as much evidence to bring them to court. They learn that Matteo is released from the mental institution but they do not know where he is hiding. Fact is, he is brought to Catalina's secure island fortress, where she incarcerates Menandro for his failure to stop the Cardinal wedding. Matteo is Catalina's chief weapon to use against Roman, who is not giving up on his wayward son. Dulce, on the other hand, has a revenge plan of her own. Furious over her mother's failure to stop the wedding, she secretly leaves the island on several trips to follow Isagani to his new home with Isay.

Isagani built Isay a beautiful matrimonial bungalow and the newlyweds are enjoying their first weeks as man and wife. Unknown to them, Dulce watches and plans her next move, even entering their home while Isay tends to her household chores.

In the meantime, Lorenzo realizes he is in love with Dianne but her familiarity with Connor makes him jealous. Things come to a head when he comes across Connor and Dianne in an embrace. Though it was a brotherly hug, Lorenzo's jealousy erupts into a fight with Connor. Furious, Dianne confronts him where he finally admits he is in love with her. Diane refuses to believe Lorenzo's sincere feelings for her.

=== Finale ===
Another tragedy hits the Cardinals when Catalina ambush and assassinate Bert and Irma Esperanza.

The ambush occurs on route to Irma's surprise birthday party. Lorenzo, following as escort behind the van, is overpowered by Catalina's men. During the altercation, Catalina arrives and shoots the couple in cold blood. Isagani's parents die in each other's arms, and that is how Isagani finds them.

The deaths of his adoptive parents affect Isagani who embarks on a murderous rampage for justice. The Cardinals once again cast their safety net and fight to get Isagani back into their fold.

The Cardinals learn that Menandro and Pilar are working with Catalina. To trap Catalina, Isagani pretends to forsake Isay and his family in a ploy to penetrate Catalina's hideout. The plan works and Pilar recruits him for Catalina.

Catalina tests Isagani's loyalty, ordering him to kill Isay, and then instructs Dulce to accompany him to make sure she is dead. Isagani poisons his wife and she succumbs to the toxin, but Connor brings the antidote in time to revive her. The plan works as Catalina brings Isagani into her force as her assassin.

Their plan unravels when Matteo discovers Isagani with Isay and his brothers. He finds Menandro hiding in Isagani's hideout, traps and kills Menandro in the burning house, and returns to tell Catalina.

Meanwhile, out to settle her score against Catalina, Nina discovers that Lupita is working against Catalina, captures her and brings her back to the Island to claim back her position as Catalina's right hand. Both Lupita and Fausto are tortured. They are saved by the arrival of the Cardinal brothers and the authorities. Catalina escapes with Nina and Mateo but blows up the island. Connor saves Lupita by switching the bomb jacket. The boat explodes and Connor is missing, feared dead.

While the Cardinals and the authorities search the surrounding areas for Connor, Lupita and Fausto are rushed to the hospital. Dulce is among Catalina's army captured during the raid. With plans to escape, she shoots herself so they bring her to the hospital instead of prison.

Meanwhile, her army diminishing into a handful, Catalina hides in her childhood home. Matteo is her only weapon remaining as she fuels his anger with a psychotic drug.

As the Cardinals escalate their raids on Catalina's criminal network, Catalina's key henchmen are captured, including the mayor who provides her safe passage, her lawyer and Nina. They cooperate with authorities to catch Catalina.

Meanwhile, Dulce escapes from the hospital but is captured by Pilar. Matteo obtains crucial information on the Cardinals' vulnerability: the Cardinal women. Catalina orders her remaining army to kidnap the Cardinal women, offering the last of her gold bars as reward.

The Cardinals learn the source of Catalina's hatred towards them: she blames Roman & Soledad for the death of her father, a bandit they had fought off and sent to jail long ago. The Cardinal successfully rescue their girlfriends, but are blindsided by the home invasion of the Cardinal Estate by Matteo, Dulce and Catalina. Roman & Soledad are taken hostage. As the Cardinal brothers rush to their parents, their girlfriends rescue Connor.

The brothers are captured and reunited with Roman and Soledad who are strapped with a bomb. An argument ensues between Catalina and the Cardinals, Matteo is surprised that his brothers and his father continue to fight for his right as a family member. Roman suffers a heart episode which requires his medication, asking Matteo to retrieve it, which he does. This enrages Dulce, and as the siblings get into a violent argument, the Cardinal brothers, free their parents and hide inside the large mansion.

Catalina breaks up the fight between Dulce and Matteo. She recaptures the Cardinal brothers, and orders Matteo to kill them. He refuses, further infuriating Catalina who decides to take matters into her hands and detonates the bombs her henchmen planted throughout the mansion. Fortunately, Connor and the Cardinal women successfully detonate the bombs a few minutes earlier. Horrified that her mother is bent on killing them all, Dulce tries to escape, but is overpowered by Lupita and the Cardinal women.

Matteo, battling the demons exacerbated by the drugs Catalina feeds him with, begins to doubt his hatred towards the Cardinals. As he hesitates finishing off his brothers, Roman comes forward to embrace his wayward son. Mad out of her mind, Catalina fires at Roman but Matteo takes the bullet and pushes Catalina off the stair rails.

Despondent, Matteo goes to the mansion's balcony and attempts suicide as he recalls how he has lost everything, including his mother. Roman and his brothers plead with him to not kill himself. Each ask him to forgive them for their misjudgments and lack of compassion, and the sins they committed against him. Remembering Sita's words to him about forgiveness, as she tended to him on the road, Matteo forgives his brothers.

He is sent to a mental institution for rehabilitation. Dulce is sentenced to life imprisonment, and Catalina survives the fall and committed to the psych ward in a mental institution. She lives the rest of her life in a straight jacket, losing her mind completely over imagined rats surrounding her bed.

With the Silverios finally defeated, the Cardinals finally live in peace, marrying their loved ones and have children. At Lucas' and Coralyn's wedding, Isagani learns that Isay is pregnant again, while Lorenzo and Dianne have three children. The last scene shows the entire family eating lunch al fresco celebrating another milestone: Matteo is finally released from the mental hospital fully rehabilitated. He begins rebuilding his relationship with his brothers, their wives, his father and Soledad.

== Cast and characters ==
=== Main ===
Don Roman Cardinal, Sr.
Played by: Ronaldo Valdez and Geoff Eigenmann (young)

-The Cardinal patriarch who married Soledad, but after a mudslide accident, he believed that his wife and son are both dead. He had an affair with three other women who each gave him a child.

Doña Consuelo Cuevas / Doña Soledad de Jesus-Cardinal
Played by: Gloria Diaz and Cristine Reyes (young)

-The Cardinal matriarch, the mother of Roman, Jr. (Isagani) and Lorenzo and also Don Roman's first love. After the mudslide she lost her memory and was renamed Consuelo. But unknown to Roman, she was pregnant with their second son, Lorenzo, when the accident happened. When her memory returned, she acts as a kind and loving stepmother to the three illegitimate sons of Roman.

Isagani "Gani" Esperanza / Roman De Jesus-Cardinal, Jr.
Played by Jake Cuenca

-Roman and Soledad's first child, he was adopted by Bert and Irma and renamed as Isagani. He is Lorenzo's oldest brother. He is the fourth Cardinal who discovers his real identity.

Lorenzo "Enzo" Cuevas / Lorenzo De Jesus-Cardinal
Played by: Joseph Marco

-The second son of Soledad and Roman. He wants to get revenge on Don Roman at first because he believes that he abandoned him and his mother, Soledad. Until he found out the truth that Alba assaulted Soledad when he was inside his mother's womb. He is Isagani's "full" brother.

Matteo Asuncion-Silverio / Matteo Asuncion-Cardinal
Played by: Marco Gumabao

-The son of Don Roman and Madeleine, Menandro raised him as his own, but unknown to Matteo, he is only using Menandro to get revenge on the Cardinals, especially Roman. He is the second Cardinal who discovers his real identity.

Connor Perez-Davide / Connor Perez-Cardinal
Played by: Joshua Colet

-Roman's son with his childhood friend Pilar, who is a prostitute. He was maltreated by his mother at a young age and planned to sell him to a foreigner. Fausto rescued him and made Connor a con artist like him. He is the first one to discover that he is a true-blooded Cardinal.

Lucas Aguilar-Cardinal
Played by: Albie Casiño

-Roman's son with Alba's personal maid, Sita. He inherited his father's leadership skills and his mother's patience and gentle nature. His mother's death turned him into a vengeful person which lead him to join the criminal underworld of Gigi to give justice to his mother's death. He is the third Cardinal who discovers his real identity.

Joaquin Santillian-Matias / Joaquin Santillian-Cardinal
Played by: Diego Loyzaga

- He is Alba's son who grew up with Don Roman. He inherited Don Roman's fairness and kindness but not his mother's malevolent and selfish traits. He grows up to lead the management team of Cardinal Distillery. But unbeknownst to him, he is not a true blooded Cardinal. Instead, he is the son of Alba and her gardener, Enrico. He was killed in a plane crash.

=== The Cardinal Ladies ===
Diane Liwanag-Cardinal
Played by: Ritz Azul

-She works as the Executive Secretary of Joaquin, Lucas, & Don Roman at Cardinal Distillery. She is also Connor's friend and Lorenzo's love interest.

Francesca Elizabeth "Isay" Navarro-Cardinal
Played by: Maxine Medina and Yesha Camile (young)

-Nante and Belen's daughter who is also Isagani's childhood friend-turned-love interest and later, wife.

Coralyn Montesevilla-Cardinal
Played by: Mary Joy Apostol

-Lucas' childhood friend and love interest. She and Lucas were married in the finale.

Lupita Bermudez-Cardinal
Played by: Mica Javier

-She has good combat skills and works for Senyora. Unknown to them, she is spying on them to give information to the Cardinals. She is Connor's love interest.

=== The Silverios ===
Menandro "Manding" Silverio
Played by: Lito Pimentel and Angelo Ilagan (young)

-The Silverio patriarch and owner of Silverio Distillery, he adopted Matteo to use him as a pawn to seek revenge on the Cardinals. He sold his sister Catalina to a rich criminal named Eduardo in exchange for money. He killed his own wife Madeleine. Menandro was also responsible for the bombing of Lorenzo's resort that killed Sita, mother of Lucas. He died after Matteo left him in a burning house.

Madeleine "Maddie" Asuncion-Silverio
Played by: Joyce Ann Burton and Cindy Miranda (young)

-Matteo's mother. She is the abused socialite wife of Menandro. She is the sole heiress of the Asuncion fortune. She was killed by Menandro in front of Matteo.

Dulce Silverio Asuncion/Dulce S. Rodriguez
Played by: Kylie Verzosa

-Catalina's daughter from another man and the niece of Menandro. Eduardo asked Menandro to kill her but he adopted her instead. She is a kind and compassionate doctor at first but she became a jealous and unreasonably scorned woman after Isagani falls in love with his childhood friend, Isay. She end up in jail.

Catalina "Senyora" Silverio-Pacheco / Catalina Rodriguez
Played by: Jean Saburit and Claire Ruiz (young)

-Dulce's biological mother and Menandro's sister. At a young age, Menandro sold her to Eduardo in exchange for money. She created her own organization composed of female assassins. She despises Roman because he killed her father, and her estranged brother Menandro, for selling her to Eduardo.

=== Supporting cast ===
Pilar Perez
Played by: Pinky Amador and Danita Paner (young)

-Connor's mother and also Roman's childhood friend who is a prostitute. She maltreated Connor and sold him to a foreigner. Like Alba, she has ambition to get the wealth of the Cardinals. She ended up in jail.

Fausto Davide
Played by: Jeffrey Santos and Alex Castro (young)

-He saved Connor after his mother sold him to a foreigner, he trained Connor to become a con artist like him. He became a father figure to Connor until the latter discovered his true identity.

Marta Evangelista
Played by: Perla Bautista

-a household worker in the Cardinal residence. She acts as a grandmother figure to Connor that made him trust the Cardinals.

Enrico Matias
Played by: Jeric Raval and Jerome Ponce (young)

-A gardener of the Santillian family, He is also the biological father of Joaquin. He extorts money from Alba in exchange of his silence about Joaquin's real identity. He was later killed by Alba.

Teresita "Sita" Aguilar
Played by: Ana Abad Santos and Mara Lopez (young)

-Lucas' mother, and Alba's personal maid. When she was young, she expressed her feelings to Roman that produced Lucas. She also knows that Joaquin is not a real Cardinal. Her death in the resort bombing organized by Menandro changed Lucas.

Gigi Octavio
Played by: Jane Oineza

-Owner of a gambling den and the leader of criminal underworld where Lucas joined. She likes Matteo. She was killed by Catalina's assassin.

Alba Santillan
Played by: Isabel Rivas and Roxanne Barcelo (young)

-Joaquin's mother. She used Joaquin to get the wealth of the Cardinals. When Soledad was lost, she stayed at the mansion as a mistress for Joaquin's sake but Roman refused to marry her. She gets impaled by a trunk after falling off a cliff.

Alberto "Bert" Esperanza
Played by: Efren Reyes and Alex Medina (young)

-The foster father of Isagani. He and his wife, Irma were killed by Catalina in an ambush.

Irma Esperanza
Played by: Rosanna Roces and Katya Santos (young)

-The foster mother of Isagani. She and her husband, Bert were killed by Catalina in the ambush.

Reynante "Nante" Navarro
Played by: Jun Nayra

-Isay's father. He is against Isagani and Isay’s marriage at first because Isagani’s half brother, Connor, sexually assaulted his daughter. But when Isay was kidnapped by Catalina's men, he saw how the Cardinal brothers risked their lives to save his daughter. He gave his blessing to Isagani to marry his daughter.

=== Guest cast ===
Jamil Muñoz
Played by: Luis Hontiveros

-Lucas' person under Gigi's organization.

Eduardo Pacheco
Played by: Toby Alejar

-A rich man who bought Catalina from Menandro.

Belen Navarro
Played by: Isay Alvarez

-Isay's mother.

Nina
Played by: Sarah Jane Abad

-Senyora's right hand man in the organization. She despises Lupita because she considers her as a threat to her status in the organization.

- MM Gigante as France
- Alvin Anson as Mr. Chan
- Teroy Guzman as Mr. Cuevas
- Alex Calleja as Danilo
- Mike Lloren as Menandro and Catalina's father
- Manuel Chua as Ernesto

=== Special participation ===
Don Ismael Cardinal
Played by: Dante Rivero

- The previous Cardinal patriarch who owns a wealthy sugar cane plantation owner of the fictitious region of Victorino. He has an illegitimate son named Roman. He only met him when he was an adult.

== Broadcast ==
Los Bastardos premiered on October 15, 2018.

=== Re-runs ===
The show began airing re-runs on Jeepney TV from March 2 to September 25, 2020; May 1 to October 13, 2023; and September 7, 2026 to February 26, 2027.

== Reception ==
Kantar Media National TV Ratings (4:20PM PST)
Pilot Episode	Finale Episode	Peak	Average
15.2% October 15, 2018	22.0% September 27, 2019	22.0% September 27, 2019	15.7%

== See also ==
- List of programs broadcast by ABS-CBN
- List of ABS-CBN Studios original drama series
- List of programs broadcast by Jeepney TV
