= Joshua Colet =

Filipino actor

- Born: January 4, 1995 (age 31); Bauan, Batangas, Philippines
- Occupation: actor
- Years active: 2012–present
- Spouses: Dani Mortel (m. 2021)

Joshua Colet (born January 4, 1995), is a Filipino actor.

== Early life and education ==
Colet was born on January 4, 1995, on Philippines, to Noel Colet.

Colet studied Tourism at the University of the Philippines Diliman.

== Personal life ==
On July 19, 2021, Colet got engaged to Dani Mortel. They got married on October 29, 2021.

On December 15, 2021, after marrying Dani Mortel, they talked about growing up with body dysmorphia and how they deal with it in their marriage.

== Filmography ==
=== Television ===
Year	Title	Role
2012	Lumayo Ka Man sa Akin	Stefano
2012	Oka2Kat	Joey
2014	Maalaala Mo Kaya: Card	Jude
2016	Maalaala Mo Kaya: Backpack	John
2017	Maalaala Mo Kaya: Rehab Center	US Friend
2017	La Luna Sangre	Leo Nakpil
2018	Ipaglaban Mo: Hazing	Titus Co
2018	Araw Gabi	Isaac Rodriguez
2018	Ipaglaban Mo: Diploma	Glen
2018	Los Bastardos	Connor P. Cardinal
2020	Maalaala Mo Kaya: Basketball Court	Tantan
2021	Huwag Kang Mangamba	Julius
2022	The Goodbye Girl	
2022	Mars Ravelo's Darna	Sigfried Cruz

=== Film ===
Year	Title	Role
2015	Filemon Mamon	Emil
2018	Fantastica	Young King Ama
2022	Nanahimik ang gabi	Young Chief
2023	Kunwari Mahal Kita	

=== Digital ===
Year	Title	Role
2018	Tonight with Boy Abunda	Guest
2018	Gandang Gabi, Vice!	Guest
2019	Tawag ng Tanghalan: Celebrity Champions	Contestant
2020	Bawal Na Game Show	Player
2020	Sunday 'Kada	Host
