= Joyce Ching =

Filipino actress

- Born: Joyce Giselle Palad Ching; January 5, 1995 (age 31); San Ildefonso, Bulacan, Philippines
- Education: MINT College
- Occupations: Actress; singer
- Years active: 2005–present
- Spouse: Kevin Alimon (m. 2019)
- Children: 2

Joyce Giselle Palad Ching-Alimon (born January 5, 1995) is a Filipino actress, She is best known for her role in television dramas Koreana, Munting Heredera, Anna Karenina, Dormitoryo, Strawberry Lane, Healing Hearts, and Hahamakin ang Lahat.

== Early life and education ==
Joyce Giselle Palad Ching was born on January 5, 1995, in San Ildefonso, Bulacan to Michael Ching, insurance agent and Minda Ching. She is half-Filipino and half-Chinese from her parents.

She finished her secondary education at Makati Integrated Christian Academy in April 2012, receiving a medal and a trophy for the Most Outstanding Christian Character Award. She graduated from Meridian International Business, Arts and Technology College (MINT College) in 2018 with a Bachelor of Arts in film.

== Career ==
Ching started her television career in 2005 when she joined Bubble Gang Jr. She made dozens of TV and print ads and played a series of young roles until she was cast as Bea in First Time. Her big break came when she landed the role of young Shirley in GMA Network's remake of Endless Love (based on Autumn in My Heart) opposite Kathryn Bernardo and Kristofer Martin. She also appeared in the teen romance drama Reel Love Presents Tween Hearts where she played the role of Ligaya also known as Aya, a nerd girl who speaks with nature. She is paired with Kristofer Martin, her co-star/loveteam in Reel Love Presents: Tween Hearts, Munting Heredera and Ikaw Lang ang Mamahalin (originally played by Sunshine Dizon).

In 2012, she played an antagonist role in Paroa: Ang Kuwento ni Mariposa opposite Barbie Forteza.

In 2013, she starred as one of the lead roles in Anna KareNina with Krystal Reyes and Barbie Forteza and Joyce played as Nina Fuentebella (originally played by Kim delos Santos). After the series, she goes back in an antagonist role in suspense thriller Sunday afternoon show Dormitoryo. She played as Airiz Ocampo, a mean girl in Branwood College that was later on revealed to be a serial killer.

In 2014, she was cast as the main antagonist in the mini-series Paraiso Ko'y Ikaw opposite Kim Rodriguez. By the last quarter of the same year, she played again for a lead role in Strawberry Lane. She played as Dorina, a soft-spoken girl accused of stealing. Her character in Strawberry Lane died earlier to open a new season. She recurred in the series as a new character to open another conflict. In her new character, she played as Amella, the girl used by Christopher (the antagonist) to deceive Morales' family so the other can steal the wealth of the family. Her new character as Amella is also a cameo role in the series.

In 2015, Ching did her first solo lead role in Healing Hearts. Kristofer Martin, her former boyfriend is her partner in the series while Krystal Reyes, her co-lead star in Anna KareNina is the main antagonist. Her role is Liza, the long-lost daughter of Rachel (played by Mickey Ferriols). The series started on May 11, 2015, and replaced Kailan Ba Tama ang Mali?.

Ching is co-managed by Sparkle GMA Artist Center and Viva Artists Agency.

In 2019, she came back as an antagonist role in Dragon Lady opposite Janine Gutierrez.

== Personal life ==
Ching started out as friends with non-showbiz husband Kevin Alimon before they started dating romantically. Alimon said, Ching was the one he would marry when he saw how devoted she's to God and her faith.

On December 8, 2019, Ching tied knot with Kevin Alimon at a garden wedding in Baguio City. In July 2024, she announced that they are expecting their first child. She had the first child on October 26, 2024 followed by the second child on October 31, 2026.

== Filmography ==
=== Film ===
Year	Title	Role	Notes
2011	Tween Academy: Class of 2012	Ashley	Main Cast
2011	Babang Luksa	Irene	Supporting Role
2012	Boy Pick-Up: The Movie	Cashier	Guest
2012	Si Agimat, si Enteng Kabisote at si Ako	Joyce	Guest
2013	Gabriel: Ito ang Kwento Ko		Supporting Role
2014	DOTA: Nakakabaliw		Supporting Role

=== Television ===
Year	Title	Role	Notes	Source
2005	Bubble Gang Jr.	Herself - Guest		
2005	Now and Forever: Agos	young Erika		
2006	Pinakamamahal	young Nannette		
2007	Lupin	young Bridgitte Maisog		
2007	Magpakailanman	young Iwa Moto	Episode: "Pagbangon ng Isang Pangarap"	
2008	Batang X: The Next Generation	Little Ms. Mimi		
2010	First Time	Bea		
2010	Endless Love	young Shirley Cruz/Dizon	Guest Cast / Antagonist	
2010	Party Pilipinas	Herself - Performer		
2010	Ang Yaman ni Lola	Cheska Henchanova Cabangot		
2010	Koreana	Amy Shin		
2010	Reel Love Presents Tween Hearts	Ligaya "Aya" Chan		
2011	Munting Heredera	Kyla Montereal		
2011	Ikaw Lang ang Mamahalin	Clarissa Delos Angeles		
2011	Maynila	Lily	Episode: "Lazy Lily"	
2011	Maynila	Joy	Episode: "Young Love in Trouble"	
2011	Maynila	Kate	Episode: "Officially Yors"	
2012	Maynila	Chesca	Episode: "Balik Puso"	
2012	Maynila	Karen	Episode: "Brave Heart"	
2012	Maynila	Faye	Episode: "It's Complicated"	
2012	Maynila	Tin	Episode: "Best Friend's for Love"	
2012	Broken Vow	Malou	Guest Cast	
2012	Paroa: Ang Kuwento ni Mariposa	Rebecca "Becca" Sarmiento		
2012	Maynila	Aimee	Episode: "Heart of Mine"	
2013	Maynila	Rina	Episode: "Wait for Love"	
2013	Magpakailanman	young Michelle Perez	Episode: "Pakawalang Angel"	
2013	Indio	Alunsina	Guest Cast / Antagonist	
2013	Anna Karenina	Anna Karenina "Nina" Fuentebella/ Anna Karenina "Nina" Barretto		
2013	The Ryzza Mae Show	Herself - Guest		
2013	Sunday All Stars	Herself - Performer		
2013	Bubble Gang	Herself - Cameo		
2013	On the Record: Chillin with Joyce Ching	Herself - Host		
2013	Unang Hirit	Herself		
2013	Dormitoryo	Margarita "Airiz" De Ocampo		
2013	Follow that Star	Herself		
2013	Villa Quintana	Crystal Almario		
2013	Pep Talk	Herself - Guest		
2013	Maynila	Chanel	Episode: "Heart of Trust"	
2014	Paraiso Ko'y Ikaw	Francheska "Cheska" Bartolome-Rodrigo		
2014	Tunay Na Buhay	Herself - Guest		
2014	Maynila	Vera	Episode: "Haligi ng Tahanan"	
2014	Maynila	Ainee	Episode: "Always in Love"	
2014	Strawberry Lane	Dorina Rosales / Amelia "Amy" Tolentino Morales / Dory Peralta		
2014	Maynila		Episode: "Lovelier the Second Time"	
2015	Maynila	Alex	Episode: "Girly Girl"	
2015	Celebrity Bluff	Herself - Guest		
2015	CelebriTV	Herself - Guest		
2015	Unang Hirit	Herself - Guest		
2015	Pepito Manaloto	Sabrina	Episode: "Ang Tunay na Kwento"	
2015	Healing Hearts	Mikaela "Mikmik" / Liza Saavedra Espanto		
2015	Celebrity Bluff	Herself - Guest		
2015	Pep Talk	Herself - Guest		
2015	Alisto	Herself		
2015	Wagas	Anna	Episode: "Dez & Anna Love Story"	
2015	Karelasyon		Episode: "Sumpa"	
2015	Because of You	Franchesca "Chesca" Salcedo		
2016	Karelasyon	Apple	Episode: "Ex ni BFF"	
2016	Maynila	Juliet	Episode: "Romeo and Juliet"	
2016	Lip Sync Battle Philippines	Herself - Contestant / Performer		
2016	CelebriTV	Herself - Guest		
2016	Dear Uge	Anna	Episode: "Utang Pa More"	
2016	Wagas	Jane	Episode: "The Power of Love"	
2016	Mars	Herself - Guest		
2016	Maynila	Maya	Episode: "A Mother's Son"	
2016	Karelasyon	Rosita	Episode: "Dahas"	
2016	Sunday PinaSaya	Herself - Guest	Episode: "Kanta Ririt"	
2016	Maynila	Asha	Episode: "Plano ng Kapalaran"	
2016	Magpakailanman	Rowena "Wena"	Episode: "Lost Phone, Love Found"	
2016	Dear Uge	Hannah/Boo	Episode: "Pak to the Future"	
2016–2017	Hahamakin ang Lahat	Rachel Tan Ke / Rachel Tan Solano-Labsat		
2017	Karelasyon	Leah / Abby	Episode: "Pretenders"	
2017	Maynila	Beng	Episode: "Hindi Tayo..."	
2017	Wish Ko Lang	Kris	Episode: "Manliligaw"	
2017	Wagas	Cecile	Episode: "Anak Araw"	
2017–2018	Super Ma’am	Dalikmata / Dolly	Supporting Role	
2018	Maynila	Gelay	Episode: "My Standby Lover"	
2018	The Stepdaughters	Grace	Extended Cast / Antagonist	
2018	Magpakailanman	Yuki	Episode: "Yuki: A Japinay Story"	
2019	Dragon Lady	Astrid Lim Chua / Astrid Lim Liu	Main Role / Antagonist	
2019	Daddy's Gurl	Claire	Guest	
2019	One of the Baes	Xtina "My Crown Princess" Aguilar	Supporting Cast / Antagonist	
2021	Regal Studio Presents	Marcia	Episode: "The Truth About Jane"	
2022	I Can See You: AlterNate	Angie Trajano	Supporting Cast	
2022	Raising Mamay	Arma Villasis	Supporting Cast	
2022	Abot-Kamay na Pangarap	Faith Villar	Guest Cast	
2023	Wish Ko Lang	Chit	Episode: "Marites"	
2024	Lilet Matias: Attorney-at-Law	young Ces Matias	Guest Cast	

== Awards and nominations ==
Year (Note: Indicates the year of ceremony. Each year is linked to the article about the awards held that year, wherever possible.)	Award	Category	Nominated work	Result	Ref.
2012	PMPC Star Awards for Movies	New Movie Actress of the Year	Tween Academy: Class of 2012	Nominated	
2013	FAMAS Award	German Moreno Youth Achievement Award	—N/a	Won	
