= Ikaw Lang ang Mamahalin (2011 TV series) =

Philippine television drama romance series

- Title card
- Also known as: Only You
- Genre: Romantic drama
- Created by: Dode Cruz
- Based on: Ikaw Lang ang Mamahalin (2001)
- Written by: Kit Villanueva-Langit; Anna Aleta-Nadela; Luningning Ribay; Geng Delgado
- Directed by: Roderick A.P. Lindayag
- Creative director: Jun Lana
- Starring: Barbie Forteza; Joshua Dionisio; Kristoffer Martin; Joyce Ching
- Theme music composer: Louie Ocampo
- Opening theme: "Ikaw Lang ang Mamahalin"
- Country of origin: Philippines
- Original language: Tagalog
- No. of episodes: 90

Production
- Executive producer: Joseph T. Aleta
- Camera setup: Multiple-camera setup
- Running time: 22–33 minutes
- Production company: GMA Entertainment TV

Original release
- Network: GMA Network
- Release: October 10, 2011 – February 10, 2012

Ikaw Lang ang Mamahalin (transl. only you that will be loved / international title: Only You) is a Philippine television drama romance series broadcast by GMA Network. The series is a remake of the 2001 Philippine television series of the same title. Directed by Roderick Lindayag, it stars Barbie Forteza, Joshua Dionisio, Kristoffer Martin and Joyce Ching. It premiered on October 10, 2011 on the network's Afternoon Prime line up. The series concluded on February 10, 2012, with a total of 90 episodes.

The series is streaming online on YouTube.

== Premise ==
Mylene and Clarissa are cousins and best friends. When a landslide strikes their community, Mylene suffers from amnesia. Clarissa later ends up in a slum area and grows up under the care of a family of crooks. While Mylene lives as Katherine, with the woman who saved her from the landslide. Clarissa meets Ferdinand, and mistakes her for being his missing daughter for she is wearing the necklace that Mylene gave to her. Seeing this as an opportunity to live a comfortable life, Clarissa pretends to be Mylene.

== Cast and characters ==
Cast

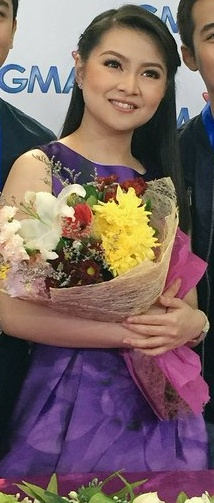
Barbie Forteza

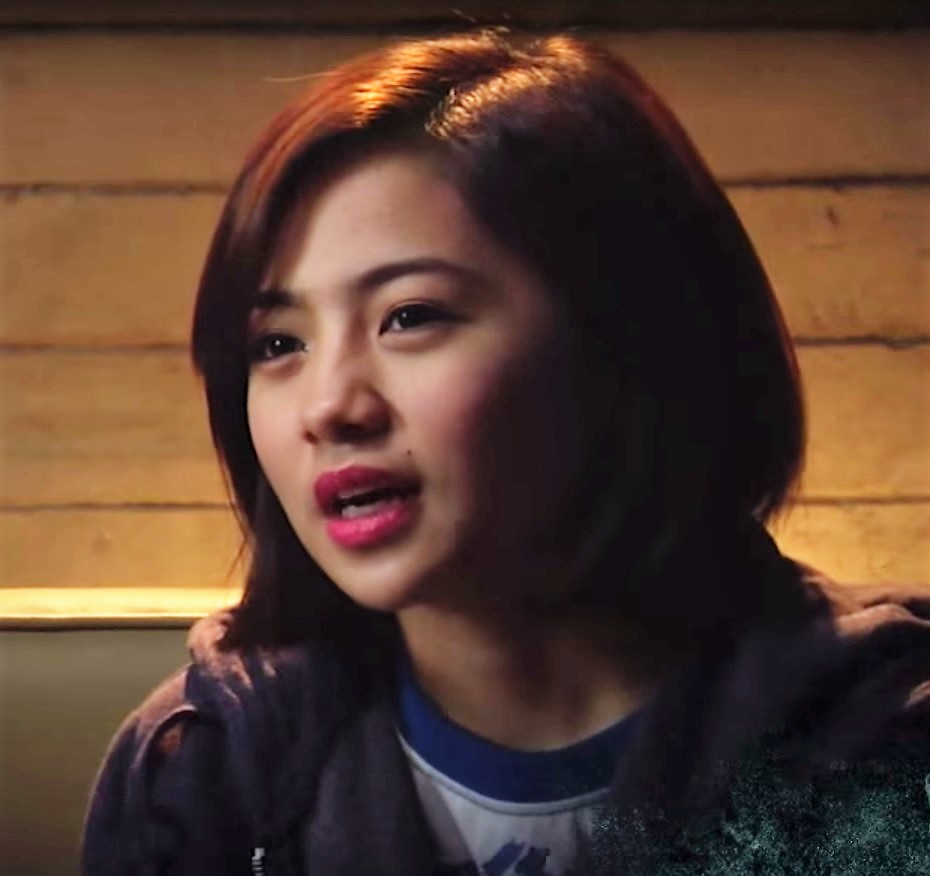
Ella Cruz

Lead cast

- Barbie Forteza as Katherine Morales / Mylene Avelino Fuentebella
- Joshua Dionisio as Charles Ballesteros
- Kristoffer Martin as Jepoy Dimaculangan
- Joyce Ching as Clarissa Delos Angeles / Clarissa Fuentebella

Supporting cast

- Gardo Versoza as Ferdinand Fuentebella
- Sheryl Cruz as Amara Luna
- Tanya Garcia as Lilian Avelino-Fuentebella
- Ehra Madrigal as Katrina
- Matet de Leon as Ising Somera
- Ernie Garcia as Badong
- Maricar de Mesa as Helena
- Karla Estrada as Loida
- Shirley Fuentes as Raquel
- Victor Aliwalas as Rommel
- Ella Cruz as Britney
- Carmen Soriano as Corazon
- Joko Diaz as Berto
- Kier Legaspi as Joel
- Teejay Marquez as Victor
- Cara Eriguel as Josie
- Chunggay Riego as Mayordoma
- Tess Bomb as Tessie

Guest cast

- Sarah Lahbati as younger Amara
- Bianca King as younger Katrina
- Diva Montelaba as younger Lilian
- Elmo Magalona as younger Ferdinand
- Julia Joan Chua as younger Clarissa
- Gianna Cutler as younger Mylene

== Production ==
Principal photography commenced on September 16, 2011.

== Ratings ==
According to AGB Nielsen Philippines' Mega Manila household television ratings, the pilot episode of Ikaw Lang ang Mamahalin earned a 15.9% rating. The final episode scored a 22.2% rating.

== Accolades ==
Accolades received by Ikaw Lang ang Mamahalin
Year	Award	Category	Recipient	Result	Ref.
2013	Golden Screen TV Awards	Outstanding Adapted Drama Series	Ikaw Lang ang Mamahalin	Nominated	
