= The Millionaire's Wife (TV series) =

2016 Philippine television drama series

- Title card
- Genre: Romantic drama
- Created by: Marlon Miguel
- Written by: Glaiza Ramirez; Gilbeys Sardea; Jesse Villabrille
- Directed by: Albert Langitan
- Creative director: Roy Iglesias
- Starring: Andrea Torres
- Theme music composer: Ann Margaret R. Figueroa
- Opening theme: "Para sa Pag-Ibig" by Frencheska Farr
- Ending theme: "Under Your Favor" by Rocco Nacino
- Country of origin: Philippines
- Original language: Tagalog
- No. of episodes: 72 (list of episodes)

Production
- Executive producer: Michele R. Borja
- Production locations: Pampanga, Philippines; Manila, Philippines
- Cinematography: Ricardo "Rommel" Santos
- Editors: Lawrence "Kish" Villenia; Jo Nieva; Kimberly Badayos; Joemill Vergara
- Camera setup: Multiple-camera setup
- Running time: 20–30 minutes
- Production company: GMA Entertainment TV

Original release
- Network: GMA Network
- Release: March 14 – June 24, 2016

The Millionaire's Wife is a 2016 Philippine television drama romance series broadcast by GMA Network. Directed by Albert Langitan, it stars Andrea Torres in the title role. It premiered on March 14, 2016, on the network's Afternoon Prime line up. The series concluded on June 24, 2016, with a total of 72 episodes.

The series is streaming online on YouTube.

== Premise ==
Louisa Ignacio, a single mother who settles in a marriage for convenience with an older man. She vows to be a wife to him in exchange of giving her son who has diabetes. After she agrees to marry Fred, Louisa will face the consequences of her decision which involves her stepdaughter, her stepdaughter's children, her child and the father of her child.

== Cast and characters ==
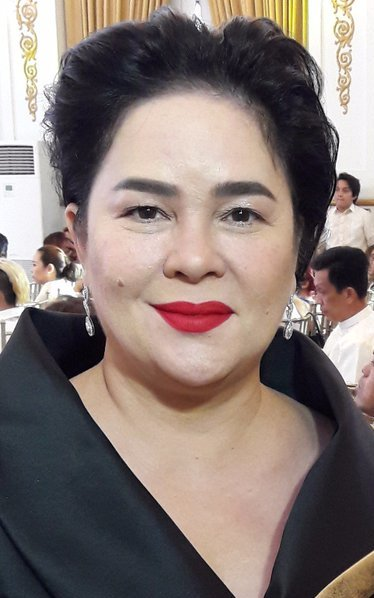
Jaclyn Jose portrays Stella Vergara-Montecillo.

Lead cast

- Andrea Torres as Luisa Ignacio-Vergara / Meneses

Supporting cast

- Mike Tan as Ivan Meneses
- Robert Arevalo as Alfredo "Fredo" Vergara
- Jaclyn Jose as Stella Vergara-Montecillo
- Ina Raymundo as Allison Montecillo
- Sid Lucero as Jared Montecillo
- James Blanco as Mike Crisostomo
- Rich Asuncion as Rosario "Rio" Samson

Guest cast

- Mymy Davao as Susan Samson
- Gilleth Sandico as Esme Meneses
- Jhoana Marie Tan as Sheila Meneses
- Luz Fernandez as Delia Cruz
- Louise Bolton as Elaine
- Denise Barbacena as Grace
- Aaron Yanga as a nurse
- Dave Roy Sotero as Rico
- Rob Moya as Jared's friend
- Billy James Renacia as Jared's friend
- Ku Aquino as Robert
- Arrly Enriquez as Ronron
- Stephanie Sol as Georgia Samson
- Justin Guevarra as Antonio "Anthony" Obras
- Sanya Lopez as Lovely
- Jade Lopez as Carla
- Mayton Eugenio as Selena Buenaluz

== Production ==
Principal photography commenced on February 26, 2016. Filming concluded in June 2016.

== Ratings ==
According to AGB Nielsen Philippines' Mega Manila household television ratings, the pilot episode of The Millionaire's Wife earned a 14.9% rating. The final episode scored a 19.2% rating.
