= Healing Hearts =

2015 Philippine television drama series

- Title card
- Genre: Drama
- Created by: Geng Delgado
- Written by: Geng Delgado; Lei Chavez; Jason Lim; Paul Sta. Ana
- Directed by: Roderick Alexis P. Lindayag
- Creative director: Roy Iglesias
- Starring: Joyce Ching; Kristoffer Martin
- Narrated by: Mickey Ferriols as Rachel
- Theme music composer: Janno Gibbs
- Opening theme: "If You Believe" by Julie Anne San Jose
- Country of origin: Philippines
- Original language: Tagalog
- No. of episodes: 89 (list of episodes)

Production
- Executive producer: Marjorie P. Garcia
- Production locations: Quezon City, Philippines
- Editors: Robert Ryan Reyes; Noel Mauricio
- Camera setup: Multiple-camera setup
- Running time: 18–25 minutes
- Production company: GMA Entertainment TV

Original release
- Network: GMA Network
- Release: May 11 – September 11, 2015

Healing Hearts is a 2015 Philippine television drama series broadcast by GMA Network. Directed by Roderick Alexis P. Lindayag, it stars Joyce Ching and Kristoffer Martin. It premiered on May 11, 2015 on the network's Afternoon Prime line up. The series concluded on September 11, 2015, with a total of 89 episodes.

The series is streaming online on YouTube.

== Premise ==
Rachel seems to have a perfect family until she discovers that her marriage is a scheme for her husband to inherit her wealth. She catches her husband and the mistress leading to her killing Michael and to her imprisonment. The mistress, Nimfa seeks revenge by stealing Rachel's daughter Mikaela. Eventually, the child grows up under the name of Liza who will eventually fall in love with Nimfa's stepson, Jay.

== Cast and characters ==
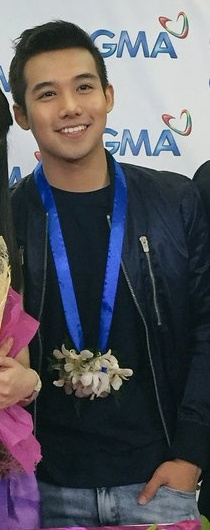
Ken Chan portrays Anton.

Lead cast

- Joyce Ching as Mikaela Liza Saavedra Espanto
- Kristoffer Martin as Jay Mendoza

Supporting cast

- Krystal Reyes as Chloe Samonte
- Ken Chan as Anton
- Angelika Dela Cruz as Nimfa Mendoza-Villamor
- Mickey Ferriols as Rachel Saavedra
- Maureen Larrazabal as Kleng Samonte
- Dominic Roco as Stephen
- Tina Paner as Alice Trajano

Guest cast

- Ronaldo Valdez as Benjie
- Neil Ryan Sese as Michael "Mike" Espanto
- Jay Manalo as Abel Villamor
- Jenny Miller as Emily Fuentes
- Arthur Solinap as Lando
- Mel Kimura as Warden
- Ashley Cabrera as younger Chloe
- Rhed Bustamante as younger Liza
- Shermaine Santiago as Elsa
- Elle Ramirez as Cecille
- Lucho Ayala as Jimboy
- Nicole Dulalia as Yvette
- Abel Estanislao as Earl
- Kyle Ocampo as May Trajano
- Robert Seña as Alfred
- Dang Cruz as Ellen
- Jace Flores as Gary
- Dino Guevarra as Fidel
- Kenneth Cruz as Kenjie
- Lotlot Bustamante as Felly
- Scarlet as Baby
- Afi Africa as Randy
- Chingga Riego as Siony
- Steph Yancha as Marlyn
- Annika Camaya as Annie
- Rania Lindayag as Chloe's friend
- Fatima Al-alawi as Chloe's friend
- Gabriel Barriento as Chloe's friend

== Ratings ==
According to AGB Nielsen Philippines' Mega Manila household television ratings, the pilot episode of Healing Hearts earned a 12.7% rating. The final episode scored a 17.9% rating.

== Accolades ==
Accolades received by Healing Hearts
Year	Award	Category	Recipient	Result	Ref.
2015	29th PMPC Star Awards for Television	Best Daytime Drama Series	Healing Hearts	Nominated	
