= Dormitoryo =

2013 Philippine television drama series

- Title card
- Also known as: The Dormitory
- Genre: Drama thriller
- Developed by: Robert Villela
- Written by: Jules Dan Katanyag; Borj Dana; John Kenneth de Leon; Liberty Trinidad; Ma. Acy Ramos
- Directed by: Jun Lana
- Creative director: Jun Lana
- Starring: Lauren Young; Enzo Pineda; Joyce Ching; Ruru Madrid; Wynwyn Marquez
- Country of origin: Philippines
- Original language: Tagalog
- No. of episodes: 13

Production
- Executive producer: Mona Coles Mayuga
- Production locations: Tagaytay, Philippines
- Cinematography: Mackie Galvez
- Camera setup: Multiple-camera setup
- Running time: 26–37 minutes
- Production company: GMA Entertainment TV

Original release
- Network: GMA Network
- Release: September 22 – December 22, 2013

Dormitoryo (transl. dormitory / international title: The Dormitory) is a 2013 Philippine television drama thriller series broadcast by GMA Network. Directed by Jun Lana, it stars Lauren Young, Joyce Ching, Enzo Pineda, Ruru Madrid and Wynwyn Marquez. It premiered on September 22, 2013. The series concluded on December 22, 2013, with a total of 13 episodes.

The series is streaming online on YouTube.

== Cast and characters ==
Cast

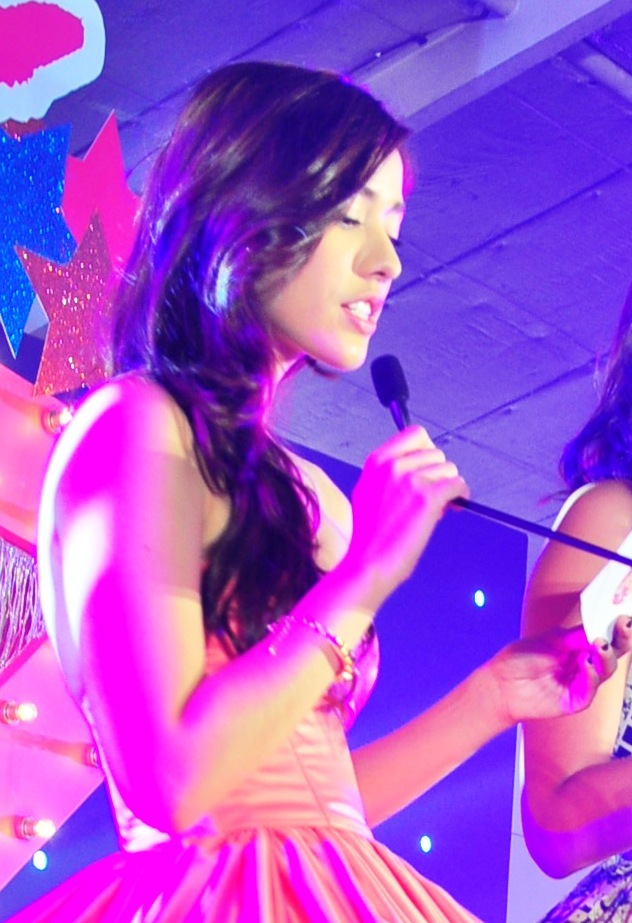
Lauren Young

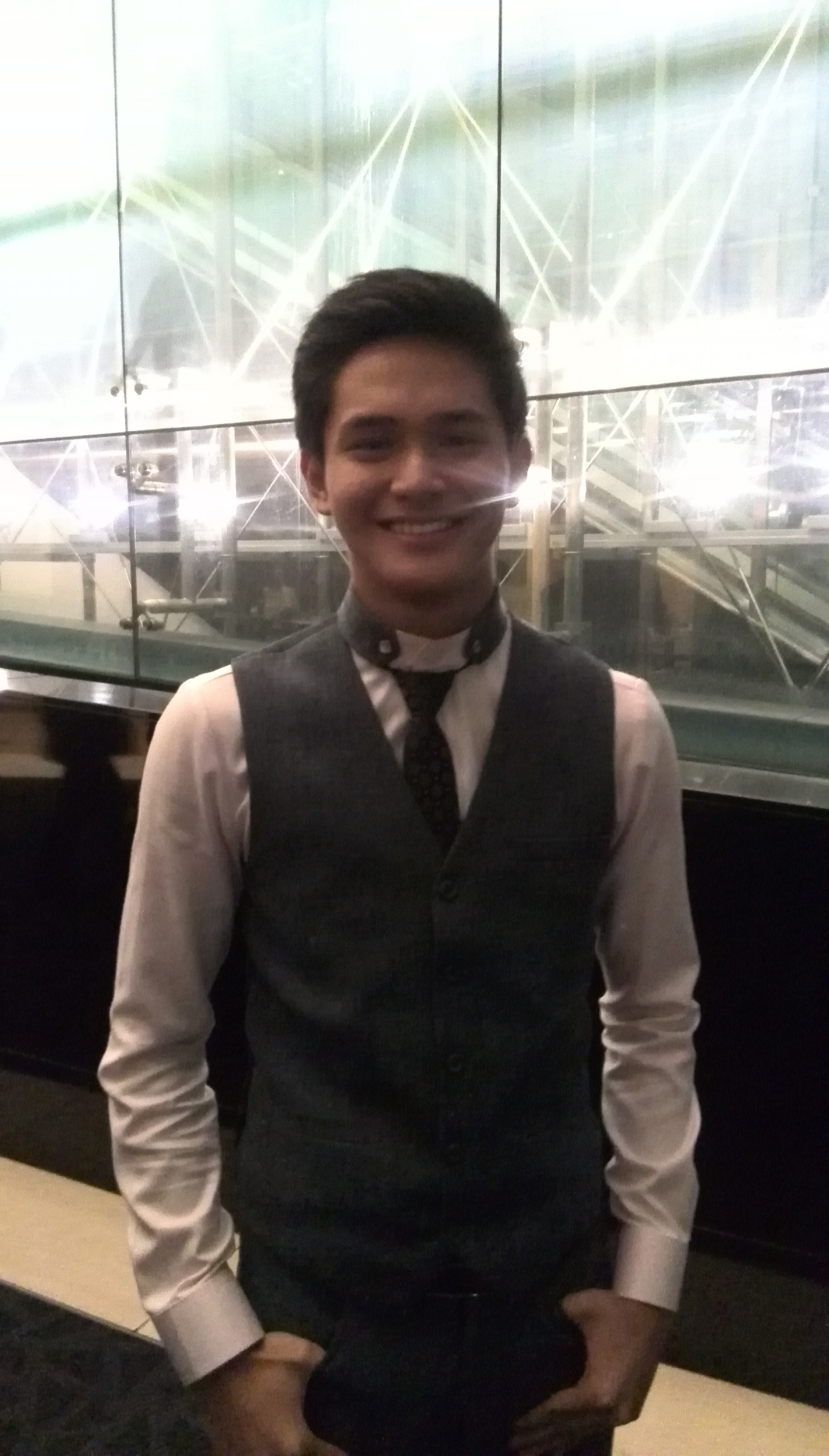
Ruru Madrid

Lead cast

- Lauren Young as Hazel "Haze" Mendoza / Hazel Benitez
- Enzo Pineda as Barney "Burn" Chavez
- Joyce Ching as Margarita "Airiz" de Ocampo
- Ruru Madrid as Charlie Chavez
- Wynwyn Marquez as Maika "Mykee" Benitez / Danica Benitez

Recurring cast

- Mayton Eugenio as Weng Dimaguiba
- Ashley Ortega as Rose Angeles
- Mel Kimura as Rona Sancuevas
- Yassi Pressman as Sophie
- Julian Trono as Kobe
- Sanya Lopez as Thea
- Gabbi Garcia as Gemma

== Development ==
The idea for the series was conceived when GMA Network wanted to put "something new" on their Sunday-afternoon block, which traditionally dominated with either teeny bop series or showbiz-oriented talk shows. And so, the network's drama department decided to "try something different on that block." Jun Lana wanted a show that represent "Generation X" and explore some relevant issues faced by the youth today, including bullying, peer pressure, dysfunctional relationships, infidelity, sibling rivalry, vague sense of morality, dishonesty and even crime. So he decided to come up with an edgy teen series with mystery-filled plot, twists and turns, wherein the lead characters deal with the controversial death of a colleague and peel away secrets that link them with each other. Lana presented the concept and the network found it to be interesting. The show is set in the fictional dormitory—the Holy Spirit Manor. The series creator had to decide on whether the setting should be inside a school or outside of it. It went through the approval and timeslot matching stages.

=== Casting ===
The cast was announced during the story conference held in August 2013, with the main cast being Lauren Young together with Joyce Ching, Enzo Pineda, Ruru Madrid and Wynwyn Marquez. The lead role Hazel Mendoza was originally intended for singer-actress Julie Anne San Jose. The network later pulled her out for another TV project. Lauren Young was chosen to replace San Jose for the said role, while the antagonist Airiz de Ocampo, the role which originally intended for Young, went to Joyce Ching. Enzo Pineda and Ruru Madrid were cast as Burn and Charlie Chavez, brothers and Hazel's love interests.

== Production ==
The series was supposed to premiere in August but it needed some "fine-tuning" before getting the go-signal to tape the pilot episode. Principal photography commenced on September 4, 2013. The series was filmed in Tagaytay. Divine Word Seminary, a seminary retreat house located also in Tagaytay, was used as the dormitory and school for the series. The series premiered on September 22, 2013. Dormitoryo was slated to run for one season, comprising thirteen episodes. According to Ali Nokom-Dedicatoria, the series' program manager, "if the ratings are good, we can extend it and do another 'dormitoryo' story (it could take another genre)."

== Ratings ==
According to AGB Nielsen Philippines' Mega Manila household television ratings, the pilot episode of Dormitoryo earned a 16.5% rating. The final episode scored a 9.6% rating.

== Accolades ==
Accolades received by Dormitoryo
Year	Award	Category	Recipient	Result	Ref.
2014	Golden Screen TV Awards	Outstanding Breakthrough Performance by An Actor	Ruru Madrid	Won	
