= Ikaw Lang ang Mamahalin =

Philippine television drama series

- Title card
- Also known as: Only You
- Genre: Romantic drama
- Developed by: Dode Cruz
- Directed by: Louie Ignacio; Khryss Adalia; Soxie Topacio
- Creative director: Jun Lana
- Starring: Angelika Dela Cruz
- Theme music composer: Louie Ocampo
- Opening theme: "Ikaw Lang ang Mamahalin" by Lani Misalucha and Joey Generoso
- Country of origin: Philippines
- Original language: Tagalog
- No. of episodes: 425

Production
- Executive producer: Redgynn Alba
- Production locations: Manila, Philippines
- Camera setup: Multiple-camera setup
- Running time: 30–40 minutes
- Production company: GMA Entertainment TV

Original release
- Network: GMA Network
- Release: March 26, 2001 – November 1, 2002

Related
- Ikaw Lang ang Mamahalin (2011)

Ikaw Lang ang Mamahalin (transl. only you whom will be loved / international title: Only You) is a Philippine television drama romance series broadcast by GMA Network. Directed by Louie Ignacio, it stars Angelika Dela Cruz. It premiered on March 26, 2001. The series concluded on November 1, 2002, with a total of 425 episodes.

The first 50 episodes of the series is streaming online on YouTube. A remake aired in 2011.

== Cast and characters ==
Lead cast

- Angelika Dela Cruz as Katherine Morales / Mylene Fuentebella / Carmencita San Diego

Supporting cast

- Sunshine Dizon as Clarissa delos Santos / Clarissa Fuentebella
- Dina Bonnevie as Martina Buenaventura
- Albert Martinez as Ferdinand Fuentebella
- Gina Alajar as Lilian delos Santos
- Cogie Domingo as Jepoy San Pedro
- James Blanco as Joseph Marcelo
- Eddie Gutierrez as Tony Madrigal
- Alicia Alonzo as Meding Morales
- Chanda Romero as Amarra Luna Fuentebella
- Carmi Martin as Beatrice Madrigal
- Janice Jurado as Mamu Lambana
- Sherwin Ordoñez as Charles Madrigal
- Gabby Eigenmann as Marc Fuentebella
- Marjorie Barretto as Vanessa Fuentebella
- Ana Capri as Gina Reyes
- K Brosas as Flor
- Mel Martinez as Finky
- Isabella de Leon as Ninay San Pedro
- Mia Gutierrez as Bebang San Pedro

Recurring cast

- LJ Moreno as Cassandra Fuentebella
- Chynna Ortaleza as Melanie Fuentebella
- Richard Gutierrez as Iñigo Zeñorosa
- Jaime Fabregas as Roberto Zeñorosa
- Russel Simon as Ruel
- Rita Avila as Corrine Martinez
- Bojo Molina as Maui Marcelo
- Mark Anthony Fernandez as Gabriel / Lorenzo
- Raven Villanueva as Yolanda / fake Mylene
- Mystica as Vera
- Geneva Cruz as Melody
- Patricia Javier as Aravella
- Danica Sotto as Agatha Narciso
- Jennifer Sevilla as Diana
- Charlie Davao as Joaquin Narciso
- Ian Veneracion as Paolo
- Paolo Ballesteros as Paul
- Gerard Pizzaras as Bato

Guest cast

- Veka Lopez as younger Katherine
- Empress Schuck as younger Clarissa
- Gary Estrada as Red Peralta
- Zoren Legaspi as Perez
- Tanya Garcia as Jessica
- Toni Gonzaga as Maya
- Trina Zuñiga as Marga
- Gary Valenciano as Ricky Lopez
- Michael de Mesa as Elmo
- Mark Gil as Miguel
- Glaiza de Castro as Marga's friend
- Tricia Roman as Enok
- Bembol Roco as Ruben
- Beverly Salviejo as Loleng
- Marky Lopez as Mike
- Rez Cortez as Basil
- Maureen Mauricio as Caring
- Kenji Marquez as Jake
- Robin da Rosa as Carlos
- Ruel Vernal as Badong
- Tom Olivar as Malvar
- Georgina Sandico as Gigi
- Paolo Bediones as Paolo
