= Hahamakin ang Lahat =

Philippine television drama series

- Title card
- Also known as: Love and Defiance
- Genre: Romantic drama
- Created by: R.J. Nuevas
- Written by: R.J. Nuevas; Kit Villanueva-Langit; Bryle Tabora; Jmee Katanyag
- Directed by: Don Michael Perez
- Creative director: Roy Iglesias
- Starring: Joyce Ching; Kristoffer Martin
- Narrated by: Eula Valdez as Ivy Tan Ke
- Opening theme: "Nang Dahil sa'yo" by Kristoffer Martin and Hannah Precillas
- Country of origin: Philippines
- Original language: Tagalog
- No. of episodes: 80 (list of episodes)

Production
- Executive producer: Darling Pulido-Torres
- Producer: Mavic Tagbo
- Production locations: Quezon City, Philippines
- Cinematography: Carlo Montano
- Editors: Mary Grace Castillo; Mildred Villegas
- Camera setup: Multiple-camera setup
- Running time: 21–33 minutes
- Production company: GMA Entertainment TV

Original release
- Network: GMA Network
- Release: October 31, 2016 – February 17, 2017

Hahamakin ang Lahat (transl. contempt all / international title: Love and Defiance) is a Philippine television drama romance series broadcast by GMA Network. Directed by Don Michael Perez, it stars Joyce Ching and Kristoffer Martin. It premiered on October 31, 2016 on the network's Afternoon Prime line up. The series concluded on February 17, 2017, with a total of 80 episodes.

The series is streaming online on YouTube.

== Premise ==
Ivy and Nelson will fall in love each other. Due to Ivy's father's disapproval to her relationship with Nelson, the two will escape which will lead to a car crash and Nelson's death. Ivy will find out that she's pregnant and the child will be raised by her sister.

== Cast and characters ==
Cast

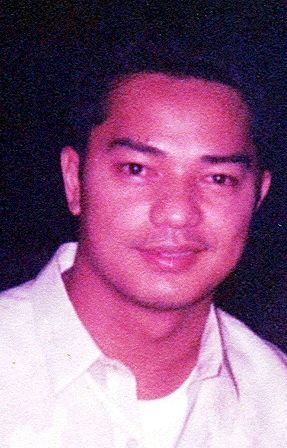
Ariel Rivera

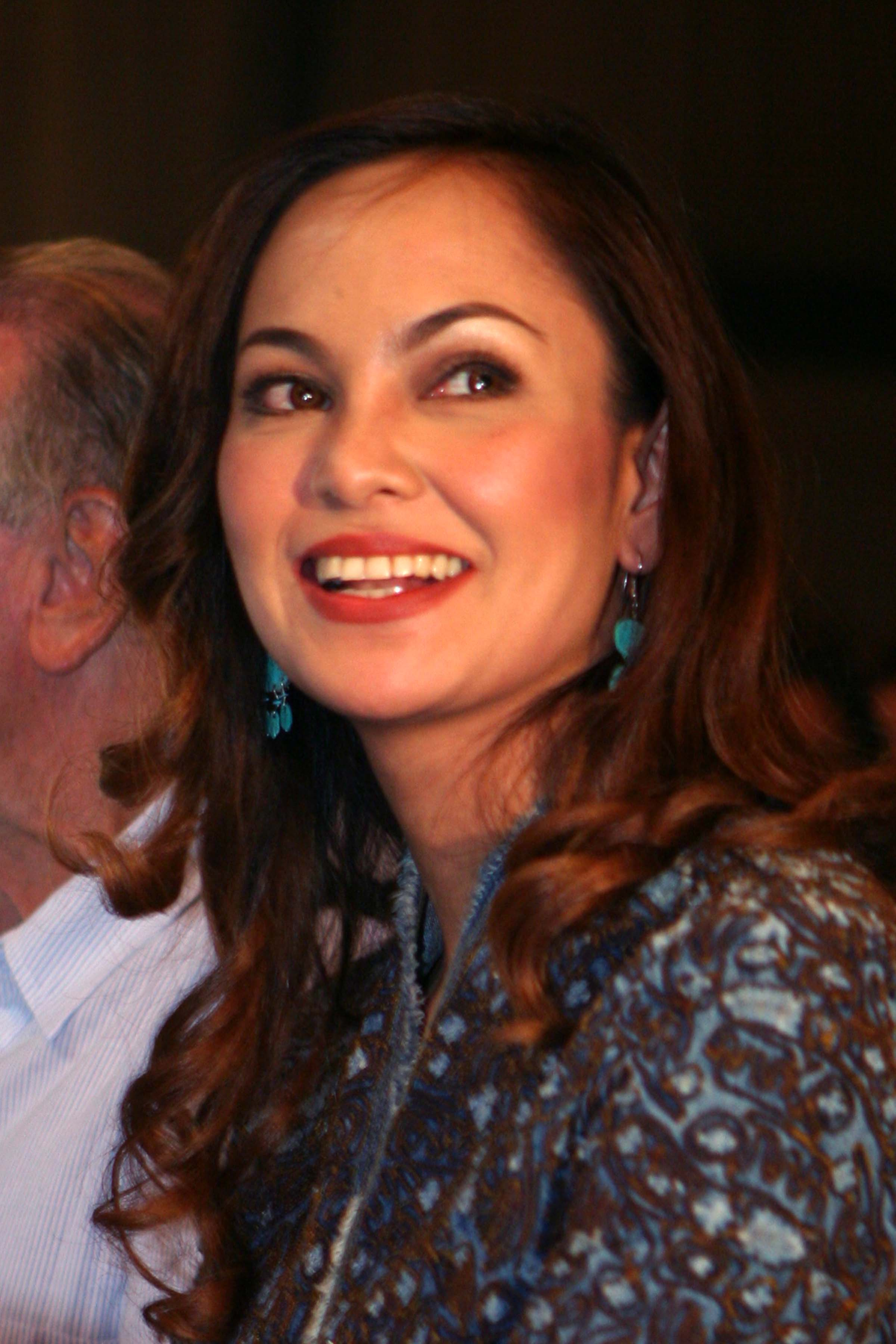
Eula Valdez

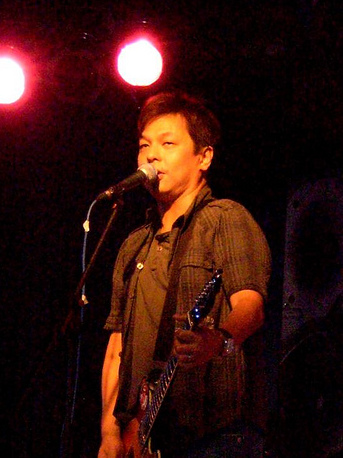
Jett Pangan

Lead cast

- Joyce Ching as Rachel Tan-Ke /Patricia Tan Solano-Labsat
- Kristoffer Martin as Luisito "Junior / Junjun" Labsat Jr.

Supporting cast

- Snooky Serna as Laura Caraca-Labsat
- Ariel Rivera as Nelson Solano / Alfred Benitez
- Eula Valdez as Ivy Tan
- Thea Tolentino as Phoebe T. Ke
- Chinggoy Alonzo as Ericson Tan
- Jett Pangan as Charlie Ke
- Marc Abaya as Luisito "Sito" Labsat Sr.
- Marina Benipayo as Cynthia Tan-Ke
- Renz Valerio as Puloy Dionisio
- Mona Louise Rey as Gigi Labsat
- Bruno Gabriel as Crisanto "Santi" Valderama III

Recurring cast

- Tina Monasterio as Divina Valderama
- Marlon Mance as Renato Valderama
- Marika Sasaki as Aliyah
- Lovely Rivero as Lily
- Allysa del Real as Cheska
- Mike "Pekto" Nacua as Johnny
- Jana Trites as Didith
- Mel Kimura as Bibsy
- Chinggay Riego as Flor
- Rebecca Chuaunsu as Karen
- Dexter Doria as Inyang

Guest cast

- Daria Ramirez as Elisa "Loring" Caraca
- Jordan Hong as Franklin Ke
- Leanne Bautista as younger Rachel
- Geson Granado as younger Luisito
- Althea Ablan as younger Phoebe

== Ratings ==
According to AGB Nielsen Philippines' Mega Manila household television ratings, the pilot episode of Hahamakin ang Lahat earned a 10.1% rating. The final episode scored a 13.4% rating.

== Accolades ==
Accolades received by Hahamakin ang Lahat
Year	Award	Category	Recipient	Result	Ref.
2017	31st PMPC Star Awards for Television	Best Drama Supporting Actress	Eula Valdez	Nominated	
2017	31st PMPC Star Awards for Television	Best New Male TV Personality	Bruno Gabriel	Nominated	
