= List of Hahamakin ang Lahat episodes =

Hahamakin ang Lahat (International title: Love and Defiance / transl. Contempt All) is a Philippine television drama romance series broadcast by GMA Network. It aired from October 31, 2016, to February 17, 2017, on the network's Afternoon Prime line up replacing Sinungaling Mong Puso and worldwide on GMA Pinoy TV.

Urban Luzon and NUTAM (Nationwide Urban Television Audience Measurement) ratings are provided by AGB Nielsen Philippines.

== Series overview ==
Month	Episodes	
Month	Episodes	Monthly averages
October 2016	1	10.1%
November 2016	22	12.1%
December 2016	22	11.7%
January 2017	22	12.3%
February 2017	13	13.3%
Total	80	11.9%

== Episodes ==
=== October 2016 ===
Episode		Original Air Date	Social media hashtag	AGB Nielsen Urban Luzon		
Episode		Original Air Date	Social media hashtag	Rating	Timeslot Rank	Ref.
1	Pilot	October 31, 2016	#HahamakinAngLahat	10.1%	#2	

=== November 2016 ===
Episode		Original Air Date	Social media hashtag	AGB Nielsen Urban Luzon		
Episode		Original Air Date	Social media hashtag	Rating	Timeslot Rank	Ref.
2	Ivy vs. Laura	November 1, 2016	#HALIvyVSLaura	11.5%	#1	
3	Young Junjun and Rachel	November 2, 2016	#HALYoungJunjunAndRachel	14.1%	#1	
4	Nasaan si Rachel	November 3, 2016	#HALNasaanSiRachel	11.9%	#1	
5	Rachel and Junjun	November 4, 2016	#HALRachelAndJunjun	13.9%	#1	
6	Halik pa More	November 7, 2016	#HALikPaMore	12.4%	#2	
7	Friendzoned	November 8, 2016	#HALFriendzoned	11.3%	#2	
8	Hugot ni Rachel	November 9, 2016	#HALHugotNiRachel	12.7%	#1	
9	Huli ka, Santi	November 10, 2016	#HALHuliKaSanti	12.6%	#1	
10	Buntis si Rachel	November 11, 2016	#HALBuntisSiRachel	12.5%	#1	
11	Junjun Saves Rachel	November 14, 2016	#HALJunjunSavesRachel	11.9%	#2	
12	Rachel, Marry Me	November 15, 2016	#HALRachelMarryMe	13.3%	#1	
13	Meet the Parents	November 16, 2016	#HALMeetTheParents	13.6%	#1	
14	Pakikisama	November 17, 2016	#HALPakikisama	11.6%	#1	
15	Bawiin si Rachel	November 18, 2016	#HALBawiinSiRachel	13.4%	#1	
16	Bagong Rachel	November 21, 2016	#HALBagongRachel	12.0%	#1	
17	Tunay na Mag-ina	November 22, 2016	#HALTunayNaMagIna	12.7%	#1	
18	Buhay pa si Nelson	November 23, 2016	#HALBuhayPaSiNelson	10.3%	#1	
19	Patawad, Rachel	November 24, 2016	#HALPatawadRachel	11.3%	#1	
20	Muling Pagtutuos	November 25, 2016	#HALMulingPagtutuos	12.8%	#1	
				AGB Nielsen NUTAM		
21	Ivy o Laura	November 28, 2016	#HALIvyOLaura	10.3%	#2	
22	Pagtitiis	November 29, 2016	#HALPagtitiis	10.0%	#2	
23	Baby in Danger	November 30, 2016	#HALBabyInDanger	10.5%	#2	

=== December 2016 ===
Episode		Original Air Date	Social media hashtag	AGB Nielsen NUTAM		
Episode		Original Air Date	Social media hashtag	Rating	Timeslot Rank	Ref.
24	Pabibo si Phoebe	December 1, 2016	#HALPabiboSiPhoebe	11.0%	#2	
25	Salpukang Ivy at Laura	December 2, 2016	#HALSalpukangIvyAtLaura	11.8%	#2	
26	Kulong si Laura	December 5, 2016	#HALKulongSiLaura	11.6%	#1	
27	Ivy ang salarin	December 6, 2016	#HALIvyAngSalarin	12.6%	#1	
28	Phoebe ang may Sala	December 7, 2016	#HALPhoebeAngMaySala	10.9%	#2	
29	Umiibig na ba?	December 8, 2016	#HALUmiibigNaBa	11.1%	#2	
30	Ivy sa kulungan	December 9, 2016	#HALIvySaKulungan	11.1%	#2	
31	Alok ni Alfred	December 12, 2016	#HALAlokNiAlfred	11.3%	#2	
32	Paglaya ni Ivy	December 13, 2016	#HALPaglayaNiIvy	12.8%	#2	
33	Selos si Rachel	December 14, 2016	#HALSelosSiRachel	11.9%	#2	
34	Junior Saves Ivy	December 15, 2016	#HALJuniorSavesIvy	12.0%	#2	
35	Rachel, anak kita	December 16, 2016	#HALRachelAnakKita	12.5%	#2	
36	Welcome Home, Rachel	December 19, 2016	#HALWelcomeHomeRachel	11.9%	#2	
37	Tensyon sa Mansyon	December 20, 2016	#HALTensyonSaMansyon	12.0%	#2	
38	Pang-aakit ni Phoebe	December 21, 2016	#HALPangAakitNiPhoebe	11.7%	#2	
39	Laura Returns	December 22, 2016	#HALLauraReturns	12.1%	#2	
40	Alfred's Proposal	December 23, 2016	#HALAlfredsProposal	11.6%	#1	
41	Muling Paghaharap	December 26, 2016	#HALMulingPaghaharap	11.4%	#1	
42	Rachel Loves Junior	December 27, 2016	#HALRachelLovesJunior	12.2%	#1	
43	Itigil ang Kasal	December 28, 2016	#HALItigilAngKasal	13.0%	#1	
44	Ama ni Rachel	December 29, 2016	#HALAmaNiRachel	11.3%	#1	
45	Rachel Meets Alfred	December 30, 2016	#HALRachelMeetsAlfred	10.7%	#2	

=== January 2017 ===
Episode		Original Air Date	Social media hashtag	AGB Nielsen NUTAM		
Episode		Original Air Date	Social media hashtag	Rating	Timeslot Rank	Ref.
46	"Rachel Jun LQ"	Monday, January 2, 2017	#HALRachelJunLQ	12.0%	#1	
47	"Laura's Party"	Tuesday, January 3, 2017	#HALLaurasParty	12.4%	#2	
48	"Ang Sampal tungkol kay Ivy" (The Slap about Ivy)	Wednesday, January 4, 2017	#HALAngSampalTungkolKayIvy	12.1%	#2	
49	"Ivy Loses It"	Thursday, January 5, 2017	#HALIvyLosesIt	12.3%	#1	
50	"Sabwatan" (Conspiracy)	Friday, January 6, 2017	#HALSabwatan	11.8%	#1	
51	"Sa pakana nga ni Cynthia" (In Cynthia's scheme)	Monday, January 9, 2017	#HALSaPakanaNgaNiCynthia	12.2%	#2	
52	"Pagpapalayas" (Eviction)	Tuesday, January 10, 2017	#HALPagpapalayas	13.5%	#1	
53	"Sa Galaw kay Phoebe" (In Moves to Phoebe)	Wednesday, January 11, 2017	#HALSaGalawKayPhoebe	13.1%	#2	
54	"Santi's Confession"	January 12, 2017	#HALSantisConfession	12.0%	#2	
55	"Alfred Remembers"	Friday, January 13, 2017	#HALAlfredRemembers	12.8%	#2	
56	"Nawawala nga si Thirdy" (Thirdy is missing)	Monday, January 16, 2017	#HALNawawalaNgaSiThirdy	11.8%	#2	
57	"Ang Pagbabalik kay Santi" (The Return of Santi)	Tuesday, January 17, 2017	#HALAngPagbabalikKaySanti	11.5%	#2	
58	"Pagkikita" (Meeting)	Wednesday, January 18, 2017	#HALPagkikita	13.1%	#1	
59	"Junior vs Santi"	Thursday, January 19, 2017	#HALJuniorVSSanti	11.5%	#2	
60	"Alfred that was Nelson"	Friday, January 20, 2017	#HALAlfredThatWasNelson	12.3%	#2	
61	"Ang Nabunyag na sa Lihim" (The Baptized in Secret)	Monday, January 23, 2017	#HALAngNabunyagNaSaLihim	12.0%	#2	
62	"Nelson Saves Rachel"	Tuesday, January 24, 2017	#HALNelsonSavesRachel	12.9%	#1	
63	"Para kay Thirdy" (For Thirdy)	Wednesday, January 25, 2017	#HALParaKayThirdy	12.4%	#2	
64	"Sa Ganti ni Santi" (In Santi's Reward)	Thursday, January 26, 2017	#HALSaGantiNiSanti	11.5%	#2	
65	"Junior's Plan"	Friday, January 27, 2017	#HALJuniorsPlan	13.3%	#1	
66	"Harapang Laura, at Cynthia" (Front Laura, and Cynthia)	Monday, January 30, 2017	#HALHarapangLauraAtCynthia	13.0%	#1	
67	"Null, and Void"	Tuesday, January 31, 2017	#HALNullAndVoid	12.0%	#1	

=== February 2017 ===
Episode		Original Air Date	Social media hashtag	AGB Nielsen NUTAM		
Episode		Original Air Date	Social media hashtag	Rating	Timeslot Rank	Ref.
68	"Junior is Sick"	Wednesday, February 1, 2017	#HALJuniorIsSick	12.7%	#1	
69	"Sugod, Laura" (Start, Laura)	Thursday, February 2, 2017	#HALSugodLaura	13.2%	#1	
70	"Santi, and Rachel's Wedding"	Friday, February 3, 2017	#HALSantiAndRachelsWedding	13.5%	#1	
71	"Ivy Returns"	Monday, February 6, 2017	#HALIvyReturns	13.4%	#1	
72	"Rachel vs. Phoebe"	Tuesday, February 7, 2017	#HALRachelVSPhoebe	13.8%	#1	
73	"Ivy, and Alfred are Reunited"	Wednesday, February 8, 2017	#HALIvyAndAlfredAreReunited	13.8%	#1	
74	"Sabwatang Cynthia, at Laura" (Conspiracy Cynthia, and Laura)	Thursday, February 9, 2017	#HALSabwatangCynthiaAtLaura	13.8%	#1	
75	"Supot ka, Phoebe" (You bag, Phoebe)	Friday, February 10, 2017	#HALSupotKaPhoebe	14.0%	#2	
76	"Huling Lunes" (Final Monday)	Monday, February 13, 2017	#HALHulingLunes	12.0%	#1	
77	"Huling Martes" (Final Tuesday)	Tuesday, February 14, 2017	#HALHulingMartes	12.6%	#1	
78	"Huling Miyerkules" (Final Wednesday)	Wednesday, February 15, 2017	#HALHulingMiyerkules	12.9%	#1	
79	"Huling Huwebes" (Final Thursday)	Thursday, February 16, 2017	#HALHulingHuwebes	14.1%	#1	
80	"Ang Pagwawakas" (The Termination)	Friday, February 17, 2017, in Finale Week	#HALAngPagwawakas	13.4%	#1	
