= List of Los Bastardos episodes =

Precious Hearts Romances Presents: Los Bastardos (lit. 'The Bastards') is a 2018 Philippine drama television series under Precious Hearts Romances loosely based on the Filipino pocket book novel Cardinal Bastards by Vanessa, starring Ronaldo Valdez, Jake Cuenca, Diego Loyzaga, Marco Gumabao, Albie Casiño, Joshua Colet, Joseph Marco, and Gloria Diaz. The series premiered on ABS-CBN's Kapamilya Gold afternoon block and worldwide via The Filipino Channel from October 15, 2018 to September 27, 2019, replacing Araw Gabi.

== Series overview ==
Season	Episodes	Originally released	
Season	Episodes	First released	Last released
1	75	October 15, 2018	January 25, 2019
2	79	January 28, 2019	May 20, 2019
3	91	May 21, 2019	September 27, 2019

== Episodes ==
=== Season 1 (2018–19) ===
No. overall	No. in season	Title	Original release date	Kantar Media Ratings (nationwide)
1	1	"Unang Bastardo"	October 15, 2018	15.2%
2	2	"Alba Desperada"	October 16, 2018	15.4%
3	3	"Meet Madeleine"	October 17, 2018	15.1%
4	4	"Apila Kay Pilar"	October 18, 2018	14.2%
5	5	"Pagsita Kay Sita"	October 19, 2018	16.6%
6	6	"Coco Brandy"	October 22, 2018	17.2%
7	7	"Kompetisyon"	October 23, 2018	15.0%
8	8	"Sanib Pwersa"	October 24, 2018	16.0%
9	9	"Banggaan"	October 25, 2018	16.0%
10	10	"Sindak"	October 26, 2018	14.4%
11	11	"Pagbalik"	October 29, 2018	12.9%
12	12	"Putik"	October 30, 2018	15.6%
13	13	"Dilemma"	October 31, 2018	13.3%
14	14	"Tagpo"	November 1, 2018	12.0%
15	15	"Pagbura"	November 2, 2018	15.1%
16	16	"Nadugas"	November 5, 2018	16.1%
17	17	"Pag-anib"	November 6, 2018	13.9%
18	18	"Sulot"	November 7, 2018	13.9%
19	19	"Kasunduan"	November 8, 2018	14.7%
20	20	"Saliksik"	November 9, 2018	14.0%
21	21	"Talampas"	November 12, 2018	15.3%
22	22	"Pagpapanggap"	November 13, 2018	13.8%
23	23	"Mantsa"	November 14, 2018	15.1%
24	24	"Paglisan"	November 15, 2018	14.6%
25	25	"Pag-ako"	November 16, 2018	13.1%
26	26	"Pag-taboy"	November 19, 2018	13.9%
27	27	"Pagninindigan"	November 20, 2018	14.9%
28	28	"Motibo"	November 21, 2018	15.3%
29	29	"Patibong"	November 22, 2018	13.1%
30	30	"Hukay"	November 23, 2018	14.7%
31	31	"Desisyon"	November 26, 2018	13.6%
32	32	"Palaban"	November 27, 2018	13.4%
33	33	"Pagsang-ayon"	November 28, 2018	14.0%
34	34	"Disgrasya"	November 29, 2018	13.0%
35	35	"Pagtatagpo"	November 30, 2018	12.7%
36	36	"Pagtatapat"	December 3, 2018	13.0%
37	37	"Hinanakit"	December 4, 2018	13.0%
38	38	"Karapatan"	December 5, 2018	11.3%
39	39	"Kumpisal"	December 6, 2018	11.6%
40	40	"Paghaharap"	December 7, 2018	12.8%
41	41	"Baho"	December 10, 2018	11.1%
42	42	"Alingasaw"	December 11, 2018	12.0%
43	43	"Tawag"	December 12, 2018	13.5%
44	44	"Paghahanda"	December 13, 2018	12.6%
45	45	"Trahedya"	December 14, 2018	13.6%
46	46	"Rockstar Boss"	December 17, 2018	15.0%
47	47	"Eskandalo"	December 18, 2018	14.5%
48	48	"Kaladkad"	December 19, 2018	14.3%
49	49	"Pagmamakaawa"	December 20, 2018	14.7%
50	50	"Pagpapalayas"	December 21, 2018	14.2%
51	51	"Pagdududa"	December 24, 2018	10.4%
52	52	"Pakikibuno"	December 25, 2018	10.3%
53	53	"Pagliyab"	December 26, 2018	12.5%
54	54	"Pagwasak"	December 27, 2018	12.1%
55	55	"Ebidensya"	December 28, 2018	14.6%
56	56	"Bulgar"	December 31, 2018	9.9%
57	57	"Pag-angkin"	January 1, 2019	12.4%
58	58	"Pagnanakaw"	January 2, 2019	14.1%
59	59	"Testigo"	January 3, 2019	12.8%
60	60	"Kapahamakan"	January 4, 2019	14.6%
61	61	"Pagsiwalat"	January 7, 2019	13.7%
62	62	"Pagkamuhi"	January 8, 2019	14.4%
63	63	"Bistado"	January 9, 2019	15.4%
64	64	"Bagong Hari"	January 10, 2019	15.7%
65	65	"Ganti"	January 11, 2019	14.3%
66	66	"Resbak"	January 14, 2019	14.7%
67	67	"Paghimok"	January 15, 2019	13.1%
68	68	"Rambol"	January 16, 2019	14.4%
69	69	"Banta"	January 17, 2019	14.3%
70	70	"Sing-sing"	January 18, 2019	13.2%
71	71	"Madugong Katotohanan"	January 21, 2019	17.7%
72	72	"Suklam"	January 22, 2019	15.9%
73	73	"Sabwatan"	January 23, 2019	16.3%
74	74	"Tapatan"	January 24, 2019	14.7%
75	75	"Agawan Ng Karapatan"	January 25, 2019	16.2%

=== Season 2 (2019) ===
No. overall	No. in season	Title	Original release date	Kantar Media Ratings (nationwide)
76	1	"Mrs. Cardinal"	January 28, 2019	15.2%
77	2	"Pagdating"	January 29, 2019	16.1%
78	3	"Engkwentro"	January 30, 2019	13.9%
79	4	"Armado"	January 31, 2019	13.8%
80	5	"Pagkikita"	February 1, 2019	14.1%
81	6	"Udyok"	February 4, 2019	16.3%
82	7	"Alinlangan"	February 5, 2019	16.0%
83	8	"Karera"	February 6, 2019	13.5%
84	9	"Sapak"	February 7, 2019	14.4%
85	10	"Peligro"	February 8, 2019	13.3%
86	11	"Hulog"	February 11, 2019	15.7%
87	12	"Aruga"	February 12, 2019	15.2%
88	13	"Pag-usisa"	February 13, 2019	14.0%
89	14	"Kumpirmasyon"	February 14, 2019	15.8%
90	15	"Katibayan"	February 15, 2019	15.7%
91	16	"Taksil"	February 18, 2019	14.7%
92	17	"Pusong Sugatan"	February 19, 2019	14.0%
93	18	"Lunod"	February 20, 2019	13.6%
94	19	"Target"	February 21, 2019	14.0%
95	20	"Siwalat"	February 22, 2019	14.9%
96	21	"Yakap"	February 25, 2019	15.7%
97	22	"Larawan"	February 26, 2019	13.9%
98	23	"Koneksyon"	February 27, 2019	14.7%
99	24	"Poot"	February 28, 2019	14.0%
100	25	"Sulyap"	March 1, 2019	14.8%
101	26	"Talon"	March 4, 2019	15.0%
102	27	"Peke"	March 5, 2019	15.5%
103	28	"Lantad"	March 6, 2019	14.0%
104	29	"Nasilayan"	March 7, 2019	15.3%
105	30	"Patunay"	March 8, 2019	15.8%
106	31	"Bihag"	March 11, 2019	17.4%
107	32	"Karma"	March 12, 2019	17.1%
108	33	"Bagong Simula"	March 13, 2019	16.1%
109	34	"Pagpapatawad"	March 14, 2019	18.3%
110	35	"Imbitasyon"	March 15, 2019	15.6%
111	36	"Salu-salo"	March 18, 2019	18.2%
112	37	"Hagupit"	March 19, 2019	17.0%
113	38	"Kaibigan"	March 20, 2019	16.0%
114	39	"Basag"	March 21, 2019	17.6%
115	40	"Yanig"	March 22, 2019	16.0%
116	41	"Bomba"	March 25, 2019	17.9%
117	42	"Damayan"	March 26, 2019	16.4%
118	43	"Dalamhati"	March 27, 2019	17.1%
119	44	"Luksa"	March 28, 2019	17.4%
120	45	"Paniningil"	March 29, 2019	16.0%
121	46	"Silakbo"	April 1, 2019	15.9%
122	47	"Panganib"	April 2, 2019	15.3%
123	48	"Pahayag"	April 3, 2019	18.2%
124	49	"Manhid"	April 4, 2019	17.1%
125	50	"Bugbog"	April 5, 2019	17.2%
126	51	"Trespasser"	April 8, 2019	17.6%
127	52	"Panunuyo"	April 9, 2019	16.5%
128	53	"Hostage"	April 10, 2019	17.2%
129	54	"Bitag"	April 11, 2019	16.4%
130	55	"Salba"	April 12, 2019	16.6%
131	56	"Kaagapay"	April 15, 2019	15.4%
132	57	"Bagong Anyo"	April 16, 2019	15.2%
133	58	"Angkinin"	April 17, 2019	15.5%
134	59	"Liyab"	April 22, 2019	15.9%
135	60	"Kupkop"	April 23, 2019	16.0%
136	61	"Singil"	April 24, 2019	17.1%
137	62	"Pagsasanay"	April 25, 2019	14.6%
138	63	"Pagpapanggap"	April 26, 2019	15.5%
139	64	"Pagsusumamo"	April 29, 2019	16.6%
140	65	"Sagip"	April 30, 2019	15.6%
141	66	"Plano"	May 1, 2019	14.5%
142	67	"Pagbaril"	May 2, 2019	15.6%
143	68	"Agaw Buhay"	May 3, 2019	17.6%
144	69	"Padre De Pamilya"	May 6, 2019	16.9%
145	70	"Donor"	May 7, 2019	17.8%
146	71	"Pakitang Tao"	May 8, 2019	16.3%
147	72	"Lab Result"	May 9, 2019	16.9%
148	73	"Paghahanap"	May 10, 2019	16.5%
149	74	"Usapang Pamilya"	May 13, 2019	15.1%
150	75	"Laro"	May 14, 2019	17.0%
151	76	"Pakiusap"	May 15, 2019	17.5%
152	77	"Konsensya"	May 16, 2019	15.6%
153	78	"Maitim Na Budhi"	May 17, 2019	19.6%
154	79	"Eskapo"	May 20, 2019	16.2%

=== Season 3 (2019) ===
No. overall	No. in season	Title	Original release date	Kantar Media Ratings (nationwide)
155	1	"Regalo"	May 21, 2019	15.4%
156	2	"Bagong Kalaban"	May 22, 2019	16.1%
157	3	"Pagtugis"	May 23, 2019	16.5%
158	4	"Sunog"	May 24, 2019	15.8%
159	5	"Aksidente"	May 27, 2019	15.2%
160	6	"Masamang Balak"	May 28, 2019	18.2%
161	7	"Natunton"	May 29, 2019	15.3%
162	8	"Babala"	May 30, 2019	15.0%
163	9	"Pamamanhikan"	May 31, 2019	15.1%
164	10	"Bulabog"	June 3, 2019	15.8%
165	11	"Piitan"	June 4, 2019	14.4%
166	12	"Pagsulsol"	June 5, 2019	15.3%
167	13	"Harapan"	June 6, 2019	13.6%
168	14	"Laban"	June 7, 2019	14.6%
169	15	"Amok"	June 10, 2019	13.5%
170	16	"Sugod"	June 11, 2019	14.1%
171	17	"Pailalim"	June 12, 2019	13.4%
172	18	"Pagsabotahe"	June 13, 2019	16.3%
173	19	"Unang Halik"	June 14, 2019	16.3%
174	20	"Desperado"	June 17, 2019	15.0%
175	21	"Tanan"	June 18, 2019	15.5%
176	22	"Abswelto"	June 19, 2019	15.3%
177	22	"Salakay"	June 20, 2019	15.9%
178	23	"Hingalo"	June 21, 2019	18.0%
179	24	"Pagsiyasat"	June 24, 2019	17.5%
180	25	"Senyora"	June 25, 2019	17.2%
181	26	"Paglason"	June 26, 2019	17.9%
182	27	"Sama Ng Loob"	June 27, 2019	17.1%
183	28	"Saksi"	June 28, 2019	16.0%
184	29	"Kunstaba"	July 1, 2019	16.7%
185	30	"Puslit"	July 2, 2019	16.8%
186	31	"Pruweba"	July 3, 2019	15.6%
187	32	"Set Up"	July 4, 2019	17.9%
188	33	"Habulan"	July 5, 2019	17.4%
189	34	"Alyansa"	July 8, 2019	17.5%
190	35	"Tukso"	July 9, 2019	18.0%
191	36	"Lusob"	July 10, 2019	19.4%
192	36	"Sorpresa"	July 11, 2019	16.6%
193	37	"Pamana"	July 12, 2019	17.4%
194	38	"Isay Gani Do Or Die"	July 15, 2019	19.1%
195	39	"Selebrasyon"	July 16, 2019	18.4%
196	40	"Unang Gabi"	July 17, 2019	16.2%
197	41	"Mahal Kita"	July 18, 2019	17.0%
198	42	"Humaling"	July 19, 2019	16.8%
199	43	"Nanghimasok"	July 23, 2019 (Note: Episode 199 did not air on July 22 as it was preempted by the coverage of the 2019 State of the Nation Address.)	16.2%
200	44	"Giba"	July 24, 2019	17.3%
201	45	"Salpukan"	July 25, 2019	17.6%
202	46	"Bangayan"	July 26, 2019	17.5%
203	47	"Birthday Surprise"	July 29, 2019	18.0%
204	48	"Ambush"	July 30, 2019	19.1%
205	49	"Pagluluksa"	July 31, 2019	16.5%
206	50	"Pagtangis"	August 1, 2019	17.6%
207	51	"Dakip"	August 2, 2019	18.2%
208	52	"Galit"	August 5, 2019	16.3%
209	53	"Palihim"	August 6, 2019	16.2%
210	54	"Pagtakwil"	August 7, 2019	16.9%
211	55	"Diskarte"	August 8, 2019	16.5%
212	56	"Palabas"	August 9, 2019	16.9%
213	57	"Preparasyon"	August 12, 2019	16.7%
214	58	"Lakbay"	August 13, 2019	15.7%
215	59	"Misyon"	August 14, 2019	16.2%
216	60	"Maskara"	August 15, 2019	16.8%
217	61	"Pagharang"	August 16, 2019	15.7%
218	62	"Piring"	August 19, 2019	17.5%
219	63	"Balatkayo"	August 20, 2019	16.1%
220	64	"Roleta"	August 21, 2019	18.7%
221	65	"Hamon"	August 22, 2019	16.9%
222	66	"Lason"	August 23, 2019	19.0%
223	67	"Pahiwatig"	August 26, 2019	18.2%
224	68	"Anunsyo"	August 27, 2019	19.2%
225	69	"Magkasangga"	August 28, 2019	19.0%
226	70	"Paglitaw"	August 29, 2019	16.4%
227	71	"Apoy"	August 30, 2019	16.5%
228	72	"Pakikipagtuos"	September 2, 2019	18.4%
229	73	"Parusa"	September 3, 2019	17.1%
230	74	"Stratehiya"	September 4, 2019	16.3%
231	75	"Atake"	September 5, 2019	18.7%
232	76	"Takas"	September 6, 2019	20.0%
233	77	"Paalam"	September 9, 2019	20.3%
234	78	"Pangako"	September 10, 2019	16.5%
235	79	"Paghabol"	September 11, 2019	18.5%
236	80	"Balita"	September 12, 2019	19.4%
237	81	"Kawala"	September 13, 2019	18.5%
238	82	"Pahamak"	September 16, 2019	18.9%
239	83	"Positive"	September 17, 2019	18.3%
240	84	"Natagpuan"	September 18, 2019	18.2%
241	85	"Dukot"	September 19, 2019	N/A
242	86	"Bilanggo"	September 20, 2019	18.3%
243	87	"Pagpapahirap"	September 23, 2019	20.3%
244	88	"Gapos"	September 24, 2019	19.3%
245	89	"Alpas"	September 25, 2019	19.9%
246	90	"Huling Laban"	September 26, 2019	21.2%
247	91	"Walang Sukuan"	September 27, 2019	22.0%

Episodes notes
