= List of Healing Hearts episodes =

Healing Hearts is a 2015 Philippine television drama series broadcast by GMA Network. It premiered on the network's Afternoon Prime line up from May 11, 2015, to September 11, 2015, replacing Kailan Ba Tama ang Mali?.

Mega Manila ratings are provided by AGB Nielsen Philippines.

== Series overview ==
Month	Episodes	Monthly Averages
Month	Episodes	Mega Manila
May 2015	15	12.6%
June 2015	22	13.0%
July 2015	22	14.1%
August 2015	21	14.9%
September 2015	9	15.5%
Total	89	14.0%

== Episodes ==
=== May 2015 ===
Episode		Original air date	Social Media Hashtag	AGB Nielsen Mega Manila Households in Television Homes			Ref.
Episode		Original air date	Social Media Hashtag	Rating	Timeslot Rank	Daytime Rank	Ref.
1	Pilot	May 11, 2015	#HealingHearts	12.7%	#1	#5	
2	Ang Rebelasyon	May 12, 2015	#HHAngRebelasyon	11.7%	#1	#7	
3	Love Triangle	May 13, 2015	#HHLoveTriangle	11.2%	#1	#8	
4	Panlilinlang	May 14, 2015	#HHPanlilinlang	11.7%	#1	#7	
5	Mikaela in Danger	May 15, 2015	#HHMikaelaInDanger	12.1%	#1	#7	
6	Finding Mikaela	May 18, 2015	#HHFindingMikaela	13.3%	#1	#4	
7	Dilim ng Paningin	May 19, 2015	#HHDilimNgPaningin	12.6%	#1	#5	
8	Stolen	May 20, 2015	#HHStolen	13.4%	#1	#5	
9	All Grown Up	May 21, 2015	#HHAllGrownUp	12.1%	#1	#6	
10	Mother's Instinct	May 22, 2015	#HHMothersInstinct	13.4%	#1	#4	
11	Crush	May 25, 2015	#HHCrush	12.1%	#1	#5	
12	Muling Pagkikita	May 26, 2015	#HHMulingPagkikita	14.0%	#1	#4	
13	Liza's New Boss	May 27, 2015	#HHLizasNewBoss	12.8%	#1	#7	
14	Mr. Sungit	May 28, 2015	#HHMrSungit	13.6%	#1	#4	
15	Tension	May 29, 2015	#HHTension	12.7%	#1	#7	

=== June 2015 ===
Episode		Original air date	Social Media Hashtag	AGB Nielsen Mega Manila Households in Television Homes			Ref.
Episode		Original air date	Social Media Hashtag	Rating	Timeslot Rank	Daytime Rank	Ref.
16	Be Careful, Liza	June 1, 2015	#HHBeCarefulLiza	12.6%	#1	#4	
17	Finding Liza	June 2, 2015	#HHFindingLiza	14.3%	#1	#4	
18	Jay Loves Liza	June 3, 2015	#HHJayLovesLiza	14.9%	#1	#4	
19	Revenge	June 4, 2015	#HHRevenge	14.2%	#1	#4	
20	Revealed	June 5, 2015	#HHRevealed	13.5%	#1	#5	
21	Sorry	June 8, 2015	#HHSorry	12.4%	#1	#6	
22	Pretty Liza	June 9, 2015	#HHPrettyLiza	14.8%	#1	#4	
23	Guho	June 10, 2015	#HHGuho	13.3%	#1	#5	
24	Tulay	June 11, 2015	#HHTulay	11.9%	#1	#5	
25	Lies	June 12, 2015	#HHLies	14.0%	#1	#5	
26	Selos	June 15, 2015	#HHSelos	12.5%	#1	#6	
27	Daydream	June 16, 2015	#HHDaydream	13.9%	#1	#4	
28	Pag-amin	June 17, 2015	#HHPagAmin	12.5%	#1	#5	
29	Kawawang Liza	June 18, 2015	#HHKawawangLiza	12.4%	#1	#5	
30	Hurt	June 19, 2015	#HHHurt	12.8%	#1	#4	
31	Paghahanap	June 22, 2015	#HHPaghahanap	12.2%	#1	#4	
32	Paratang	June 23, 2015	#HHParatang	12.0%	#1	#4	
33	Explanation	June 24, 2015	#HHExplanation	11.5%	#1	#5	
34	Confused Jay	June 25, 2015	#HHConfusedJay	11.6%	#1	#5	
35	First Kiss	June 26, 2015	#HHFirstKiss	12.4%	#1	#5	
36	Banta ni Chloe	June 29, 2015	#HHBantaNiChloe	12.2%	#1	#4	
37	Layas, Liza!	June 30, 2015	#HHLayasLiza	13.3%	#1	#4	

=== July 2015 ===
Episode		Original air date	Social Media Hashtag	AGB Nielsen Mega Manila Households in Television Homes			Ref.
Episode		Original air date	Social Media Hashtag	Rating	Timeslot Rank	Daytime Rank	Ref.
38	Accident	July 1, 2015	#HHAccident	12.3%	#1	#4	
39	Back in Jail	July 2, 2015	#HHBackInJail	10.8%	#1	#5	
40	Chloe vs. Liza	July 3, 2015	#HHChloeVsLiza	11.2%	#1	#5	
41	Rejection	July 6, 2015	#HHRejection	15.7%	#1	#4	
42	No DNA Match	July 7, 2015	#HHNoDNAMatch	13.3%	#1	#4	
43	Chloe Attacks	July 8, 2015	#HHChloeAttacks	16.3%	#1	#4	
44	Small World	July 9, 2015	#HHSmallWorld	15.3%	#1	#4	
45	Paglayo ni Liza	July 10, 2015	#HHPaglayoNiLiza	15.0%	#1	#5	
46	Separate Lives	July 13, 2015	#HHSeparateLives	14.2%	#1	#4	
47	Helping Liza	July 14, 2015	#HHHelpingLiza	14.1%	#1	#4	
48	Liza Loves Jay	July 15, 2015	#HHLizaLovesJay	13.4%	#1	#4	
49	Galit ni Rachel	July 16, 2015	#HHGalitNiRachel	14.9%	#1	#4	
50	Palaban na si Liza	July 17, 2015	#HHPalabanNaSiLiza	14.0%	#1	#5	
51	Nimfa's Scheme	July 20, 2015	#HHNimfasScheme	12.8%	#1	#4	
52	Rachel and Liza	July 21, 2015	#HHRachelAndLiza	14.5%	#1	#4	
53	Jay's Strategy	July 22, 2015	#HHJaysStrategy	14.8%	#1	#4	
54	Jay's Escape	July 23, 2015	#HHJaysEscape	13.7%	#1	#4	
55	Rescuing Rachel	July 24, 2015	#HHRescuingRachel	17.1%	#1	#4	
56	Paalam	July 28, 2015 (Note: Episode 56 did not air on July 27 during the 2015 State of the Nation Address live coverage.)	#HHPaalam	12.7%	#1	#5	
57	Nawawala	July 29, 2015	#HHNawawala	16.7%	#1	#3	
58	Pagtatago	July 30, 2015	#HHPagtatago	14.9%	#1	#4	
59	Buntis si Nimfa	July 31, 2015	#HHBuntisSiNimfa	12.9%	#1	#5	

=== August 2015 ===
Episode		Original air date	Social Media Hashtag	AGB Nielsen Mega Manila Households in Television Homes			Ref.
Episode		Original air date	Social Media Hashtag	Rating	Timeslot Rank	Daytime Rank	Ref.
60	Demolition	August 3, 2015	#HHDemolition	12.8%	#1	#5	
61	Abel's Offer	August 4, 2015	#HHAbelsOffer	14.0%	#1	#4	
62	Liza's Sacrifice	August 5, 2015	#HHLizasSacrifice	14.1%	#1	#4	
63	Rachel's New Home	August 6, 2015	#HHRachelsNewHome	15.9%	#1	#3	
64	Old Wounds	August 7, 2015	#HHOldWounds	14.7%	#1	#5	
65	Second Chance	August 10, 2015	#HHSecondChance	15.1%	#1	#5	
66	Bintang	August 11, 2015	#HHBintang	14.6%	#1	#5	
67	Lihim	August 12, 2015	#HHLihim	17.0%	#1	#4	
68	Payback	August 13, 2015	#HHPayback	15.2%	#1	#5	
69	Sampal	August 14, 2015	#HHSampal	14.7%	#1	#5	
70	The Proposal	August 17, 2015	#HHTheProposal	14.2%	#1	#5	
71	Eksena ni Nimfa	August 18, 2015	#HHEksenaNiNimfa	14.0%	#1	#5	
72	Jealous Jay	August 19, 2015	#HHJealousJay	15.8%	#1	#4	
73	Checkup	August 20, 2015	#HHCheckUp	15.4%	#1	#4	
74	Abel at Nimfa	August 21, 2015	#HHAbelAtNimfa	18.6%	#1	#3	
75	Para sa Anak	August 24, 2015	#HHParaSaAnak	16.1%	#1	#5	
76	Nimfa's Doubt	August 25, 2015	#HHNimfasDoubt	14.3%	#1	#6	
77	Kakaibang Abel	August 26, 2015	#HHKakaibangAbel	13.1%	#1	#6	
78	Hindi Makatao	August 27, 2015	#HHHindiMakatao	14.2%	#1	#5	
79	Liza in Danger	August 28, 2015	#HHLizaInDanger	14.9%	#1	#5	
80	Tangka ni Nimfa	August 31, 2015	#HHTangkaNiNimfa	14.2%	#1	#5	

=== September 2015 ===
Episode		Original air date	Social Media Hashtag	AGB Nielsen Mega Manila Households in Television Homes			Ref.
Episode		Original air date	Social Media Hashtag	Rating	Timeslot Rank	Daytime Rank	Ref.
81	Huwag, Abel!	September 1, 2015	#HHHuwagAbel	14.2%	#1	#4	
82	Liars	September 2, 2015	#HHLiars	14.7%	#1	#5	
83	Lampin	September 3, 2015	#HHLampin	15.9%	#1	#4	
84	Mother's Fear	September 4, 2015	#HHMothersFear	14.2%	#1	#6	
85	Jay to the Rescue	September 7, 2015	#HHJayToTheRescue	14.5%	#1	#5	
86	Chloe's Discovery	September 8, 2015	#HHChloesDiscovery	14.3%	#1	#5	
87	Abel's Threat	September 9, 2015	#HHAbelsThreat	16.3%	#1	#3	
88	The Revelation	September 10, 2015	#HHTheRevelation	17.3%	#1	#4	
89	Finale	September 11, 2015	#HHFinale	17.9%	#1	#3	

Episodes notes
