= List of The Millionaire's Wife episodes =

The Millionaire's Wife is a 2016 Philippine television drama romance series broadcast by GMA Network. It premiered on the network's Afternoon Prime line up from March 14, 2016 to June 24, 2016, replacing Destiny Rose.

Mega Manila ratings are provided by AGB Nielsen Philippines.

== Series overview ==
Month	Episodes	Monthly Averages
Month	Episodes	Mega Manila
March 2016	12	15.1%
April 2016	21	13.6%
May 2016	21	13.0%
June 2016	18	16.2%
Total	72	14.5%

== Episodes ==
=== March 2016 ===
Episode		Original air date	Social Media Hashtag	AGB Nielsen Mega Manila Households in Television Homes			Ref.
Episode		Original air date	Social Media Hashtag	Rating	Timeslot Rank	Daytime Rank	Ref.
1	Pilot	March 14, 2016	#TheMillionairesWife	14.9%	#1	#5	
2	Masungit na Pasyente	March 15, 2016	#TMWmasungitNaPasyente	16.2%	#1	#3	
3	Private Nurse	March 16, 2016	#TMWprivateNurse	15.5%	#1	#3	
4	Millionaire's Grandson	March 17, 2016	#TMWmillionairesGrandson	15.6%	#1	#5	
5	Muling Pagkikita	March 18, 2016	#TMWmulingPagkikita	14.3%	#1	#4	
6	Millionaire's Proposal	March 21, 2016	#MillionairesProposal	14.6%	#1	#4	
7	Para sa Anak	March 22, 2016	#TMWparaSaAnak	16.7%	#1	#5	
8	Millionaire's Fiancee	March 23, 2016	#MillionairesFiancee	16.1%	#1	#5	
9	Tangka ni Jared	March 28, 2016	#TMWTangkaNiJared	14.0%	#1	#5	
10	Tuloy ba ang Kasal?	March 29, 2016	#TMWtuloyBaAngKasal	14.8%	#1	#6	
11	Ang Paghaharap	March 30, 2016	#TMWangPaghaharap	14.6%	#1	#4	
12	Millionaire's Wedding	March 31, 2016	#MillionairesWedding	14.6%	#1	#5	

=== April 2016 ===
Episode		Original air date	Social Media Hashtag	AGB Nielsen Mega Manila Households in Television Homes			Ref.
Episode		Original air date	Social Media Hashtag	Rating	Timeslot Rank	Daytime Rank	Ref.
13	The Millionaire's Daughter	April 1, 2016	#TheMillionairesDaughter	15.4%	#1	#4	
14	Paninira	April 4, 2016	#TMWPaninira	15.7%	#1	#4	
15	Pahamak na Halik	April 5, 2016	#TMWPahamakNaHalik	13.8%	#1	#6	
16	Pasabog ni Stella	April 6, 2016	#TMWPasabogNiStella	15.1%	#1	#4	
17	Beast Mode Allison	April 7, 2016	#TMWBeastModeAllison	14.9%	#1	#5	
18	Ipaglaban mo, Ivan	April 8, 2016	#TMWipaglabanMoIvan	13.3%	#1	#5	
19	Tunay na Ama	April 11, 2016	#TMWtunayNaAma	15.0%	#1	#3	
20	Kahati sa Mana	April 12, 2016	#TMWkahatiSaMana	14.3%	#1	#5	
21	Hanap ay Ama	April 13, 2016	#TMWhanapAyAma	12.0%	#1	#6	
22	Bonding ng Mag-ama	April 14, 2016	#TMWbondingNgMagAma	13.9%	#1	#5	
23	Emergency	April 15, 2016	#TMWemergency	12.7%	#1	#7	
24	Wawa sa Ama	April 18, 2016	#TMWWawaSaAma	11.6%	#1	#7	
25	Pag-ampon	April 19, 2016	#TMWpagampon	12.2%	#1	#5	
26	Back to School	April 20, 2016	#TMWbackToSchool	14.3%	#1	#5	
27	Hello, Sir Mark!	April 21, 2016	#TMWhelloSirMark	13.9%	#1	#5	
28	Selos	April 22, 2016	#TMWselos	13.7%	#1	#5	
29	Kakampi nga ba?	April 25, 2016	#TMWkakampiNgaBa	13.4%	#1	#4	
30	Taksil ka, Rio!	April 26, 2016	#TMWtaksilKaRio	12.1%	#1	#5	
31	Friendship Over	April 27, 2016	#TMWfriendshipOver	11.8%	#1	#5	
32	Bagong Pananagutan	April 28, 2016	#TMWbagongPananagutan	13.3%	#1	#5	
33	Allison's Ex	April 29, 2016	#TMWAllisonsEx	12.7%	#1	#6	

=== May 2016 ===
Episode		Original air date	Social Media Hashtag	AGB Nielsen Mega Manila Households in Television Homes			Ref.
Episode		Original air date	Social Media Hashtag	Rating	Timeslot Rank	Afternoon Rank	Ref.
34	Pag-amin	May 2, 2016	#TMWPagAmin	12.9%	#1	#5	
35	Second Chance	May 3, 2016	#TMWsecondChance	12.7%	#1	#5	
36	Kaibigan lang ba?	May 4, 2016	#TMWkaibiganLangBa	12.6%	#1	#3	
37	Gulatan	May 5, 2016	#TMWgulatan	12.8%	#1	#4	
38	Ikaw pa rin	May 6, 2016	#TMWikawPaRin	13.1%	#1	#4	
39	Tatsulok	May 10, 2016 (Note: Episode 39 did not air on May 9 during the 2016 Philippine general election news coverage.)	#TMWtatsulok	13.7%	#1	#3	
40	Maling Hinala	May 11, 2016	#TMWmalingHinala	12.3%	#1	#5	
41	Duda ni Jared	May 12, 2016	#TMWdudaNiJared	12.4%	#1	#5	
42	Set Up	May 13, 2016	#TMWsetUp	12.0%	#1	#5	
43	Takot ni Louisa	May 16, 2016	#TMWtakotNiLouisa	11.6%	#1	#5	
44	Pag-uusisa	May 17, 2016	#TMWpagUusisa	11.3%	#1	#5	
45	Insecure si Alfredo	May 18, 2016	#TMWinsecureSiAlfredo	13.4%	#1	#5	
46	Ang Paghihigpit	May 19, 2016	#TMWangPaghihigpit	13.8%	#1	#5	
47	Resbak	May 20, 2016	#TMWresbak	12.4%	#1	#5	
48	Walang Tiwala	May 23, 2016	#TMWwalangTiwala	12.8%	#1	#5	
49	Pagtakas	May 24, 2016	#TMWpagtakas	11.3%	#1	#6	
50	Ang Paghahanap	May 25, 2016	#TMWangPaghahanap	13.9%	#1	#4	
51	Pagkabulag	May 26, 2016	#TMWpagkabulag	13.6%	#1	#5	
52	Taning	May 27, 2016	#TMWtaning	13.6%	#1	#5	
53	Paglayo kay Stella	May 30, 2016	#TMWpaglayoKayStella	13.6%	#1	#5	
54	Pagnanasa ni Jared	May 31, 2016	#TMWpagnanasaNiJared	16.5%	#1	#3	

=== June 2016 ===
Episode		Original air date	Social Media Hashtag	AGB Nielsen Mega Manila Households in Television Homes			Ref.
Episode		Original air date	Social Media Hashtag	Rating	Timeslot Rank	Afternoon Rank	Ref.
55	Paalam, Alfredo	June 1, 2016	#TMWpaalamAlfredo	13.3%	#1	#4	
56	Palabas ni Stella	June 2, 2016	#TMWpalabasNiStella	15.8%	#1	#4	
57	Bintang	June 3, 2016	#TMWbintang	16.2%	#1	#4	
58	Ang Tagapagmana	June 6, 2016	#TMWangTagapagmana	14.9%	#1	#4	
59	Uhaw sa Mana	June 7, 2016	#TMWuhawSaMana	15.4%	#1	#5	
60	Pagdakip	June 8, 2016	#TMWpagdakip	15.0%	#1	#5	
61	Suspetsa ni Louisa	June 9, 2016	#TMWsuspetsaNiLouisa	16.7%	#1	#4	
62	Louisa in Danger	June 10, 2016	#TMWLouisaInDanger	15.9%	#1	#5	
63	Panganib sa Buhay	June 13, 2016	#TMWpanganibSaBuhay	14.5%	#1	#5	
64	Si Delia ang Susi	June 14, 2016	#TMWsiDeliaAngSusi	15.5%	#1	#4	
65	Magsalita ka, Delia!	June 15, 2016	#TMWmagsalitaKaDelia	15.5%	#1	#5	
66	Huli ka, Jared!	June 16, 2016	#TMWhuliKaJared	16.4%	#1	#4	
67	Sinungaling ka, Delia!	June 17, 2016	#TMWsinungalingKaDelia	16.2%	#1	#4	
68	Huling Lunes	June 20, 2016	#TMWHulingLunes	15.7%	#1	#3	
69	Huling Martes	June 21, 2016	#TMWHulingMartes	17.3%	#1	#4	
70	Huling Miyerkules	June 22, 2016	#TMWHulingMiyerkules	18.5%	#1	#3	
71	Huling Huwebes	June 23, 2016	#TMWHulingHuwebes	19.2%	#1	#2	
72	Ang Pagwawakas	June 24, 2016	#TMWAngPagwawakas	19.2%	#1	#3	

Episodes notes
