= Roderick Lindayag =

Roderick Alexis P. Lindayag is a director for TV in the Philippines.

He is an older brother of Rondel P. Lindayag, who also worked for ABS-CBN Corporation.

== Filmography ==
=== TV director ===
Year	Title	Network
2024–2025	Lumuhod Ka Sa Lupa	TV5
2023–2024	Pira-Pirasong Paraiso	Kapamilya Channel
2022	How to Move On in 30 Days	YouTube
2019	Los Bastardos	ABS-CBN
2018	Araw Gabi	ABS-CBN
2018	The Blood Sisters	ABS-CBN
2017–2018	Wildflower	ABS-CBN
2016	Be My Lady	ABS-CBN
2015	Healing Hearts	GMA Network
2014	My BFF	GMA Network
2013	Pyra: Babaeng Apoy	GMA Network
2013	Kakambal ni Eliana	GMA Network
2012	Hiram na Puso	GMA Network
2012	Sana Ay Ikaw na Nga	GMA Network
2012	Together Forever	GMA Network
2011	Ikaw Lang ang Mamahalin	GMA Network
