= Julie Anne San Jose =

Filipino singer (born 1994)

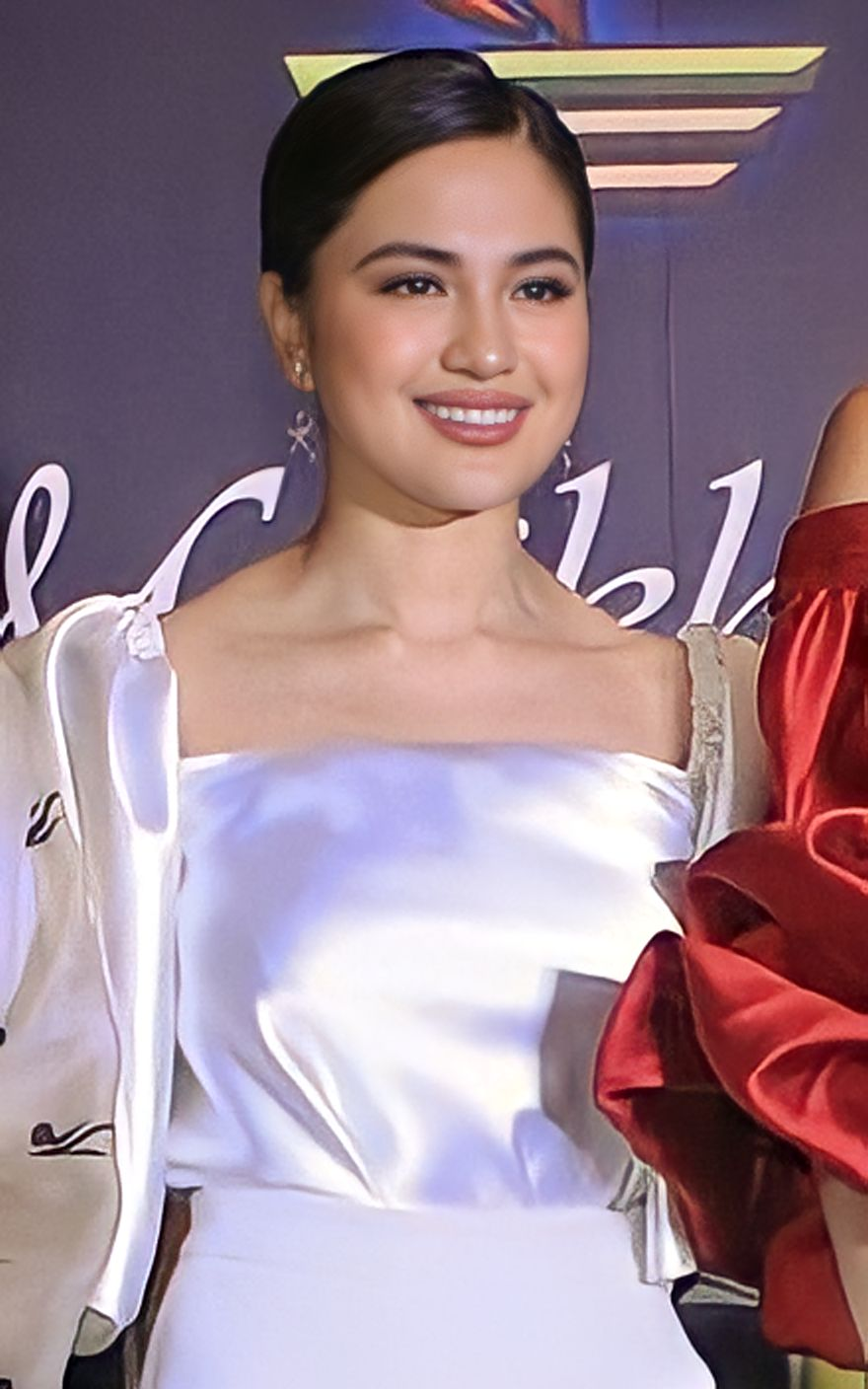
- San Jose in 2020
- Born: Julie Anne Peñaflorida San Jose; May 17, 1994 (age 32); Quezon City, Philippines
- Education: UST Angelicum College (BA)
- Occupations: Singer; songwriter; actress
- Years active: 1998–present
- Musical career
- Genres: OPM; R&B; pop
- Instruments: Vocals; guitar; piano; drums; ukulele; flute; violin
- Labels: GMA Music; Universal Records
- Website: julieannesanjose.com

Julie Anne Peñaflorida San Jose (born May 17, 1994) is a Filipino singer and actress. She rose to prominence after competing in the reality singing competition Popstar Kids in 2005.

San Jose is one of the best-selling recording artists of the 2010s in the Philippines. She is the youngest recipient of the Diamond Record Award from the Philippine Association of the Record Industry for her album Julie Anne San Jose (2012), selling 150,000 copies in the country. Among her many accolades include two FAMAS Awards, five Awit Awards, three Myx Music Awards, four PMPC Star Awards For Music, and induction into the Eastwood City Walk of Fame in 2015.

She gained prominence as an actress with many primetime and daytime dramas. San Jose starred in Kahit Nasaan Ka Man (2013), My Guitar Princess (2018), and Heartful Café (2021) on the GMA Network. She earned acting credits with ensemble soaps such as Buena Familia (2015–2016) and a remake of the film Pinulot Ka Lang sa Lupa (2017). She achieved further acclaim as an actress in the primetime soap opera Maria Clara at Ibarra (2022–2023), a drama series inspired by the Filipino novel written by José Rizal, Noli Me Tángere, where she played the demure Maria Clara.

== Early life and education ==
Julie Anne Peñaflorida San Jose was born on May 17, 1994, at San Bernardino Hospital in Novaliches, Quezon City, Philippines to Jonathan Roque San Jose, a computer operator from Manila and Marivic Camzon Peñaflorida, an instructor from Marinduque . She is the eldest among her three siblings.

San Jose attended grade school at Our Lady of Pagkabuhay Parochial School and moved to Sto. Niño de Novaliches School. She went to college at UST Angelicum College with a degree in Communications Arts and received her college diploma in 2016.

== Career ==
=== 1994–2009: Beginnings and Pop Star Kids ===
At two and half years old, San Jose sang Donna Cruz’s version of "Habang May Buhay." Her mother enrolled her at the Center for Pop Music when she turned three. In the same year, she was cast on the children's show Batibot.

In 1998, San Jose competed in Eat Bulaga!'s Little Miss Philippines, where she ended as first runner-up. She also competed in Magandang Tanghali Bayan's Munting Miss U and was third runner-up. She then appeared in a TV advertisement with Sharon Cuneta.

San Jose did not pursue a full-time show business career until 2005 when she joined Pop Star Kids, a singing competition on QTV (now GTV) hosted by R&B singer-songwriter Kyla. Although San Jose did not win the grand prize, she joined Sugarpop, the show's spin-off child singing group composed of her co-finalists Rita Daniela (then known as Rita De Guzman Iringan), Pocholo Bismonte, Enzo Almario (then known as Renzo Almario), and Vanessa Rangadhol. Sugarpop released two studio albums, Sugar Pop and Sugar Pop Repackaged. The group had a show on QTV titled Planet Q, where a young San Jose and her groupmates showcased their hosting abilities. Sugarpop also performed weekly on the GMA's variety show, SOP.

She did various soundtracks for Kapuso teleseryes and shows including two for Marian Rivera's Dyesebel: Aking Mundo and Siya Na Nga Kaya. In November 2008, she sang the GMA Christmas Station ID, "Awit ng Puso", composed by Simon Peter Tan.

In 2008, San Jose made her acting debut on GMA Network's afternoon soap opera Gaano Kadalas ang Minsan?, where she played a supporting character to Camille Prats and Marvin Agustin.

=== 2010–11: career breakthrough ===
When SOP ended in 2010, San Jose joined its replacement show, Party Pilipinas, as a solo artist. As she evolved as a performer, she began to showcase her singing, dancing, and acting abilities onstage. San Jose was also paired with a then-budding artist and rapper, Elmo Magalona. Collectively, they were known as the musical tandem JuliElmo. In Party Pilipinas, JuliElmo starred in five short films, the Red Mask Trilogy and Yellow Note 1 and 2 and the short musicals Blue Jeans: The Musical (2011), Elmo and Julie Anne: A Wazak Love Story (2012), and Status: It's Complicated (2013).

San Jose's career took a major leap when she joined GMA-7's Party Pilipinas. Her YouTube video rendition of Nicki Minaj's "Super Bass" became popular. Soon, San Jose was one of the most promising and popular young singers in the Kapuso block. She was included in the "Top 10 Women to Watch" list by the Women Leaders’ Centre in collaboration with Arc Media Global. She also made the list of "New Breed of Stars to Watch Out For In 2012."

In 2011, San Jose was chosen as the front act for David Archuleta's major concert at the Smart Araneta Coliseum. Archuleta revealed in an interview that it was his personal choice to have Julie Anne San Jose as the front act for his concert.

=== 2012–15: multimedia artist ===
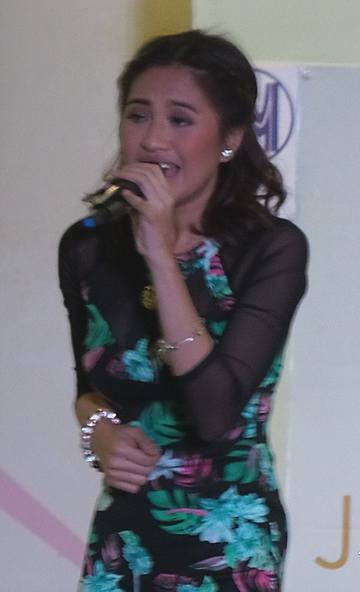
San Jose in 2015

In February 2012, San Jose signed an exclusive recording contract with GMA Records. Six months later, she released her eponymous debut album, Julie Anne San Jose, which received numerous awards and was certified Diamond Record awardee. Her single, "I'll Be There", remains the only single certified quadruple platinum by the Philippine Association of the Record Industry (PARI). Currently, San Jose has released four singles from her album.

In 2012, San Jose finally landed a lead role through the youth-oriented weekly show Together Forever. She played the role of Antoinette Escueta, more popularly known as Toyang, a boyish daddy's girl who falls in love with her best friend. The same year, San Jose debuted as a movie actress on GMA Films' summer romance Just One Summer opposite her JuliElmo partner Elmo Magalona. She played the role of Maria Bettina "Beto" Reyes Salazar and sang the movie theme song "Bakit Ba Ganyan?" which was originally popularized by Dina Bonnevie. The film was directed by Mac Alejandre.

In 2013, San Jose had her first major solo concert at the Music Museum in Greenhills, San Juan. This birthday concert entitled Julie Anne: It's My Time was a success, selling out just five days after going on sale. Guests included the dance crew Addlib, Fliptop star Abra, Elmo Magalona, and Frencheska Farr, a multi-faceted performer and friend of San Jose. Marc Lopez was the music director; the concert director was Rico Gutierrez.

San Jose landed more television projects in GMA Network in the following years. She played the lead role in the primetime drama series Kahit Nasaan Ka Man, a visually impaired but musically talented girl named Pauline Gomez. She was paired with Kristofer Martin, who played her love interest. She was also part of the now-defunct Sunday musical variety show Sunday All Stars as a lead performer. Her hosting skills were also showcased in her stint in the Marian Rivera self-titled weekly dance show Marian, alongside her co-host Christian Bautista. She also played a recurring character named Nikki in Pepito Manaloto, who is the love interest of Chito, played by Jake Vargas.

In June 2014, San Jose released her second solo studio album entitled Deeper via iTunes worldwide and spinnr.ph. Her second album received a "Triple Platinum" award from PARI in January 2016. In December 2014, following the release of her second album, San Jose had her second major concert, Julie Anne San Jose: Hologram, at the Mall of Asia Arena. Guests include Sam Concepcion, Christian Bautista, Abra, Jonalyn Viray, and Frencheska Farr.

In 2014, San Jose was part of the Metro Manila Film Festival film entry Kubot: The Aswang Chronicles 2, where she played the role of Stacey. She starred alongside Dingdong Dantes, Isabelle Daza, Lotlot De Leon, Abra and many other artists.

In 2015, San Jose released her digital single "Tidal Wave," which was arranged by Sidney Brown, better known as Omen, an American music producer from Harlem. San Jose filmed three music videos in New York City and California with Los Angeles-based company VIM Entertainment. In October 2015, Julie Anne San Jose, was chosen alongside Christian Bautista to represent the Philippines in the One-Asia Seoul Mega Concert in South Korea. The lineup included famous K-pop idols CNBLUE, Ailee, Got7 as well as other artists throughout Asia.

In April 2015, San Jose replaced Isabel Oli in GMA News TV's Day Off. She was joined by co-hosts Dasuri Choi and Boobay. San Jose was part of the afternoon soap Buena Familia alongside Kylie Padilla, Julian Trono, and Jake Vargas, who is her current on-screen partner. In August 2015, she became a part of the Sunday variety show Sunday PinaSaya.

In December 2015, San Jose received a star on the Philippines Walk of Fame. She also won two major awards in the recently concluded 28th Awit Awards at the Music Museum.

=== 2016–18: a decade in the industry ===
In July 2016, she released her third solo studio album entitled Chasing the Light under GMA Records. Her album release event was held at SM Fairview Mall in the Philippines on July 17, 2016, with crowds of thousands. The album was well-received and continues to hold the top spot on iTunes PH albums. Chasing the Light features songwriting and a rap feature from Filipino-American hip hop artist and songwriter C-Tru on the tracks "Don't Make Me Wait," "Take Me To Nirvana," and "All About You."

In November 2016, San Jose held a concert at the same venue in Kia Theatre. She joined forces with Christian Bautista as they shared the sold-out concert stage in "When Julie Anne Meets Christian".

In January 2017, she played the lead role in the afternoon soap Pinulot Ka Lang sa Lupa as Santina Marquez. The show ended after its 11th week.

In June 2017, San Jose went viral online with her cover of the latest hit single "Despacito" by Luis Fonsi featuring Daddy Yankee and Justin Bieber. The Viral YouTube Video Cover also landed a feature on famous international sites like 9gag TV and Superstar Magazine.

San Jose left GMA Records and signed a contract under Universal Records, then began working on another album in November 2017.

In January 2018, she started her year with a Sold Out Intimate Concert at Music Museum. #Julie highlighted the different stages of love in the concert. "It's going to be intimate. It will be more mature, especially when it comes to song choices. And as the title suggests, I will show—through music—the different stages of love and tackle relationships and what goes with them," the 23-year-old singer-actress told reporters at a press conference. Right after her #Julie Concert, San Jose prepared for another Concert with Christian Bautista and Ms. Regine Velasquez-Alcasid.

In May 2018, as Cosmopolitan magazine Philippines marked their last print issue, Julie Anne San Jose was featured on the final cover. She is the last cosmo cover girl on their print issue in the month of May as they ventured into the digital world.

In July 2018, after months of anticipation, she presented Breakthrough, her first album under Universal Records. Prior to the album's release on July 27, its first three singles had garnered multiple achievements. Her originals, "Nothing Left" and "Tayong Dalawa", both reached No. 1 on the iTunes Philippines All-Genre Chart just 30 minutes after release. Additionally, her rendition of the "Parokya Ni Edgar" classic "Your Song (My One and Only)" exceeded 5 million plays on Spotify. Upon its release, the album celebrated commercial success in both digital and CD formats. The album debuted at No. 1 on the iTunes Philippines All-Genre Chart and maintained the spot for a week, a rare feat for OPM albums. Breakthrough also received impressive sales during the jam-packed Grand Album Launch at the Eastwood Mall Open Park.

In November 2018, she was invited on Gary Valenciano's Advocacy Album, Awit at Laro, to promote Filipino games and songs through art and music. She is the only GMA Artist on the album, in which San Jose performs the song "Pitik Bulag", Composed by Jungee Marcelo.

In May 2018, San Jose starred in a daytime musical series My Guitar Princess, where she plays the main character, Celina Raymundo, a.k.a. the "Guitar Princess", along with leading stars Gil Cuerva and Kiko Estrada. The show features original soundtracks, including the show's theme song "Walang Kapalit", created by Roxy Fabian. The featured songs did really well on iTunes Ph Chart and Spotify.

San Jose becomes the lead host of GMA Network's musical variety show Studio 7, that premiered on October 14, 2018. She made her voice acting debut in the first Filipino anime series, Barangay 143, on GMA Network.

=== 2019–present ===
In January 2019, she bagged two awards at Wish Music Awards 2019 and renewed her contract with Universal Records (Philippines). Her rendition of "Your Song" hit seven million streams on Spotify.

In February 2019, San Jose spent Valentine's Day on Gloria de Dapitan's "Lyrics of Love, LOL: A Valentine Concert and Comedy Night with Julie Anne San Jose." She also released a new single, "Maleta", a collaboration with Gloc-9, it hit number 1 on two charts of iTunes Philippines, All Genre Songs and Hip-Hop/Rap.

In March 2019, After the successful debut of Maleta, San Jose shot a music video for the song. Julie Anne received a Favorite Album Award for Breakthrough at the first Inside Showbiz Awards. She also performed at the anticipated Castaway Music Festival in SM City Rosales.

In April 2019, San Jose released her newest composition, Regrets. The emotional song is a reflection of her experiences in the past year. Minutes after its release, the single reached the top spot on the iTunes Philippines All Genre and Pop Charts, continuing her streak of No. 1 hit singles.

In May 2019, Artist Center announced her as the Artist of The Month of May, who took the center stage in a series of digital features to celebrate her birthday. After a successful series of Studio7 Musikalye concerts across Manila and an unforgettable Kapuso concert in Dagupan, San Jose joined a musical variety show Studio 7 and GMA Pinoy TV brought the show to Brooklyn, New York City, for "Kapusong Pinoy Studio 7 Musikalye sa Brooklyn."

San Jose "embraced womanhood" as the PEP main attraction July Covergirl. She then played a sold-out "Julie Sings The Divas" concert.

She is one of Organisasyon ng Pilipinong Mang-Aawit's (OPM) active Junior Ambassadors. Her job as a Junior Ambassador is to represent and promote Filipino Music. San Jose is also a celebrity advocate of World Vision, an international child-focused non-government organization that mainly promotes children's rights, well-being, and education.

San Jose along with Rayver Cruz took over as the hosts of singing competition The Clash, replacing Regine Velasquez (the original host) that returned to GMA's rival, ABS-CBN.

After the cancellations of Sunday PinaSaya and Studio 7, San Jose joined the musical-comedy variety show All-Out Sundays as one of the main hosts and performers since its premiere on January 5, 2020.

She was named one of the newest ambassadors for music by the National Commission for Culture and the Arts (NCCA). She was awarded a plaque of recognition to solidify her role.

== Other ventures ==
=== Business ===
In 2022, San Jose launched her own online clothing brand, Mundane Club with her sister Joanna as business partner.

== Personal life ==
San Jose has opened up about mental health and taking care of oneself.

In 2022, San Jose is exclusively dating actor Rayver Cruz; her first encounter with him was in 2018 when Cruz transferred to the GMA Network. They started out as best friends for a while. Eventually, their close friendship developed into a relationship when they worked together on the competition show The Clash. She is open to settling down with Cruz, after the actor revealed that he plans to marry her.

== Discography ==
=== Studio albums ===
- Julie Anne San Jose (2012)
- Deeper (2014)
- Chasing the Light (2016)

=== EPs ===
- Forever (2015)
- Breakthrough (2018)

=== Other albums ===
- SugarPop
- SugarPop Repackaged

=== Compilation albums ===
- Tween Academy: Class of 2012 (soundtrack)
- GMA Records' No. 1 Hits
- Beauty & the Music Vol. 1
- Pers Lab : GMA Collection Series
- Julie Anne San Jose: The Anthology Vol.1
- My Guitar Princess OST

== Filmography ==
=== Film ===
| Year | Title | Role | Ref. |
|---|---|---|---|
| 2011 | Tween Academy: Class of 2012 | Herself | |
| 2012 | My Kontrabida Girl | | |
| 2012 | Just One Summer | Maria Bettina "Beto" Reyes Salazar | |
| 2014 | Kubot: The Aswang Chronicles 2 | Stacey | |
| 2023 | The Cheating Game | Hope Celestial | |

=== Television series ===
| Year | Title | Role | Ref. |
|---|---|---|---|
| 2008 | Sine Novela: Gaano Kadalas ang Minsan | Claudette Medrano | |
| 2011–12 | Daldalita | Marga de Leon | |
| 2012 | Tween Hearts | Mira | |
| 2012 | Together Forever | Antoinette "Toyang" Escueta | |
| 2013 | Kahit Nasaan Ka Man | Pauline Gomez | |
| 2014 | Himig Ng Pasko | Christiana | |
| 2015–16 | Buena Familia | Darling Buena | |
| 2017 | Pinulot Ka Lang sa Lupa | Santina Marquez-Esquivel | |
| 2018 | Barangay 143 | Vicky (Voice) | |
| 2018 | My Guitar Princess | Celina Raymundo | |
| 2021 | Heartful Café | Heart Fulgencio | |
| 2022–23 | Maria Clara at Ibarra | María Clara / Clarisse Torres | |
| 2024 | Pulang Araw | Katy Dela Cruz | |
| 2025 | Slay: 'Til Death Do Us Part | Liv Baltazar | |
| 2026 | Born to Shine | Younger Dara Halari | |

=== Web series ===
| Year | Title | Role | Ref. |
|---|---|---|---|
| 2021 | STILL (Musical Narrative Series) | Lauralene "Laura" Ramirez | |
| 2023 | Pag-ibig Na Kaya (UR Original Series) | Sab Valera | |

=== Television shows ===
| Year | Title | Role | Ref. |
|---|---|---|---|
| 2007–10 | SOP | Herself / Host / Performer | |
| 2010–13 | Party Pilipinas | Herself / Host / Performer | |
| 2013–15 | Sunday All Stars | Herself / Host / Performer | |
| 2014 | Marian | Herself / Co-host / Performer | |
| 2015–19 | Sunday PinaSaya | Herself / Main host / Performer | |
| 2018–19 | Studio 7 | Herself / Main host / Performer | |
| 2020–present | All-Out Sundays | Herself / Main host / Performer | |
| 2023 | The Voice Generations | Herself / Coach / Judge | |
| 2023 | It's Showtime | Herself / TNT Hurado / Guest Performer | |
| 2024-2026 | The Voice Kids | Herself / Coach / Judge | |

=== Sitcom (comedy shows) ===
| Year | Title | Role |
|---|---|---|
| 2011 | Andres de Saya | Lizzy |
| 2013–21 | Pepito Manaloto | Nicollete "Nikki" Villamil |
| 2017 | Bubble Gang | Guest role |
| 2022 | Happy Together | Anna Roberto |

=== TV show host ===
| Year | Title | Role |
|---|---|---|
| 2007–08 | Planet Q (QTV Kids Program) | Herself / Host |
| 2015–22 | 24 Oras | Herself / Reliever Chika Minute Anchor |
| 2015–16 | Day Off | Herself / Main Host |
| 2016 | Mars | Herself / Reliever Co-Host |
| 2019–2025 | The Clash | Herself / Clash Master / Host |
| 2026 | The Clash Teens | Herself / Clash Master / Host |

=== Anthologies ===
| Year | Title | Role |
|---|---|---|
| 2011 | Maynila: Victims of Love | Tracy |
| 2011 | Maynila: Kaninong Puso | Jade |
| 2011 | Maynila: Takot na Puso | Kim |
| 2013 | Maynila: Tunay Na Pag-Ibig | Paula |
| 2013 | Maynila: Hate You, Love You | Danica |
| 2013 | Maynila: Music and Miracles | Saree |
| 2015 | Wagas: Lala Roque and Ronnie Galongca Love Story | Lala Roque |
| 2015 | Wish Ko Lang | Bernadeth Corpuz |
| 2017 | Dear Uge: I Luv PH | Love |
| 2017 | Magpakailanman: I Will Follow You | Jelai Andres |
| 2018 | Maynila: U R My Fortune | Madam Strawberry |
| 2018 | Dear Uge: I Don't Like KDrama! | Cory |
| 2018 | Daig Kayo ng Lola Ko: Tarzan and Jane | Jane |
| 2018 | Wish Ko Lang!: Kristine&Denmar Love Story | Kristine |
| 2019 | Dear Uge: Dancing In Tandem | Rica |

=== Various TV shows ===
| Year | Title | Role |
|---|---|---|
| 1998 | Eat Bulaga! (Little Miss Philippines) | Herself / Contestant / 1st runner-up |
| 1999 | Magandang Tanghali Bayan (Munting Miss U) | Herself / Contestant / 3rd runner-up |
| 2001–02 | Hershey's Kidz Town | Herself |
| 2005 | A.S.T.I.G. (All Set To Intimate God) | Herself / Host |
| 2006 | Popstar Kids | Herself / Finalist |
| 2009 | Art Angel | Herself / Guest |
| 2009 | Dantes Peak | Herself / Guest Performer |
| 2015 | Pambansang Almusal | Herself / Guest Performer |
| 2016 | The Magic of Christmas: The 2016 GMA Christmas Special | Herself / Host / Performer |
| 2019 | Shopee 11.11 Big Christmas TV Special | Herself / Host / Performer |
| 2019–20 | Kapuso Countdown to 2020: The GMA New Year Special | Herself / Main Host / Performer |
| 2021 | Shopee 12.12 Big Christmas Sale TV Special | Herself / Main Host / Performer |
| 2022 | Lazada Epic 10th Birthday Super Party | Herself / Main Host / Performer |
| 2022–23 | Kapuso Countdown to 2023: Gayo Daejeon | Herself / Host / Performer |
| 2023–24 | Kapuso Countdown to 2024: The GMA New Year Special | Herself / Host / Performer |
| 2024–25 | Kapuso Countdown to 2025: Isa Sa Puso | Herself / Host / Performer |
| 2025 | Beyond 75: The GMA 75th Anniversary Special | Herself / Performer |

== Awards and nominations ==
Highlights

- Julie Anne San Jose was featured on the digital billboard of Times Square in New York to promote her music on Spotify's "Equal" campaign which focuses on women's empowerment
- Top 10 Asia Awards at Kuala Lumpur – Asia Music Icon (Personality Of the Year)
- Silver Awardee for Limitless: A Musical Trilogy - New York Festivals TV and Film Awards
- Aliw Awards 2020 – Entertainer of The Year
- Julie Anne San Jose is one of the celebrities who received her star at the 2015 Walk of Fame at Eastwood Citywalk
- Yahoo! Philippines OMG! Awards 2013 – Female Performer of the Year
- PMPC Star Awards for Music 2017 – Female Pop Artist of the Year
- Spinnr Hitlist Award 2014 – Best Indie Artist
- UE Gawad Lualhati Awards 2014 – Inspiring Artist of the Year
- Awit Awards 2015 – Best Selling Album of the Year for "Deeper"

== Concerts ==
=== Solo concerts ===
- Julie Anne: It's My Time! (1st Major Concert) (2013)
- HOLOGRAM (2014)
- IN CONTROL! (10th Anniversary Concert) (2016)
- #JULIE (2018)
- Julie Sings The Divas (2019)
- Limitless, A Musical Trilogy Part I: Breathe (2021)
- Limitless, A Musical Trilogy Part II: Heal (2021)
- Limitless, A Musical Trilogy Part III: Rise (2022)

=== Collaboration concerts ===
- Beyond Limits (2011)
- When Julie Anne Meets Christian (2016)
- 3 Stars and 1 Heart (2018)
- The Sweetheart and the Balladeer (2019)
- JulieVerse (2022)
- Queendom Live! (2023)
- Love Bound (2024)
- Julie x Stell: Ang Ating Tinig (2024)

=== GMA Pinoy TV / Sparkle concert series ===
- Kapusong Pinoy Sa Dubai (2013)
- Kapusong Pinoy Sa New York (2015)
- Kapusong Pinoy: Paskuhan at Kantawanan Sa Anaheim (2018)
- Kapusong Pinoy: Studio 7 Musikalye Sa Brooklyn (2019)
- Together Again: A GMA Pinoy TV @ 17 Concert, Temecula, California, US (2022)
- Taste of Manila: Isang Dekada Na! Canada (2023)
- Sparkle Goes to Canada - Calgary & Toronto (2024)
- Sparkle World Tour - Anaheim & San Francisco, CA, USA (2024)

=== Supporting act ===
- David Archuleta Live in Manila (2011)
- One Mega Seoul (2015)
- Globe: Disney Princess, I Dare To Dream Concert! (2017)
- R3.0 (30th Anniversary Concert) (2017)
