= Kahit Nasaan Ka Man =

2013 Philippine television drama series

- Title card
- Also known as: Love Sonata
- Genre: Romantic drama; Musical
- Created by: Suzette Doctolero
- Written by: Suzette Doctolero
- Directed by: Gil Tejada Jr.
- Creative directors: R.J. Nuevas; Dode Cruz; Jun Lana
- Starring: Julie Anne San Jose; Kristofer Martin
- Theme music composer: Agatha Obar-Morallos
- Opening theme: "I'll Be There" by Julie Anne San Jose and Kristofer Martin
- Country of origin: Philippines
- Original language: Tagalog
- No. of episodes: 40

Production
- Executive producers: Lilybeth G. Rasonable; Redgie Acuna-Magno; Michelle Borja; Cheryl Ching-Sy; Nini Matilac
- Production locations: Quezon City; Pampanga; Bulacan
- Camera setup: Multiple-camera setup
- Running time: 30–45 minutes
- Production company: GMA Entertainment TV

Original release
- Network: GMA Network
- Release: September 23 – November 15, 2013

Kahit Nasaan Ka Man (transl. wherever you are / international title: Love Sonata) is a 2013 Philippine television drama romance series broadcast by GMA Network. Directed by Gil Tejada Jr., it stars Julie Anne San Jose and Kristofer Martin. It premiered on September 23, 2013 on the network's Telebabad line up. The series concluded on November 15, 2013, with a total of 40 episodes.

== Cast and characters ==
Cast

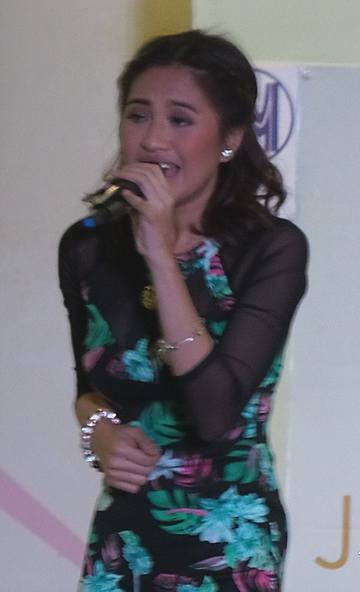
Julie Anne San Jose

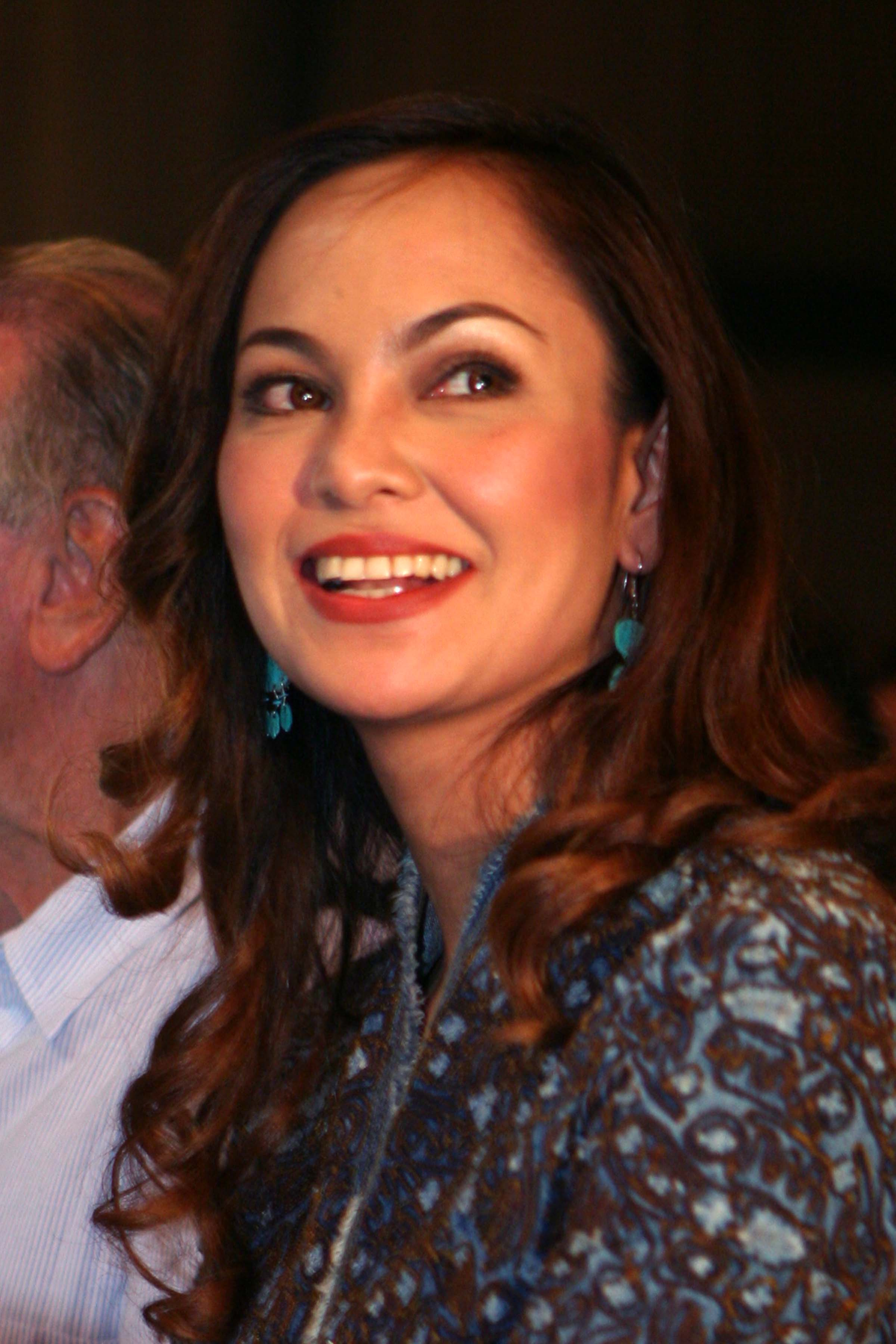
Eula Valdez

Lead cast

- Julie Anne San Jose as Pauline Gomez
- Kristoffer Martin as Leandro de Chavez

Supporting cast

- Eula Valdez as Theresa de Chavez
- Rita Avila as Delia
- Ronaldo Valdez as Tino Gomez
- Tessie Tomas as Corazon
- Yayo Aguila as Medel
- Michael de Mesa as Ernesto Gomez
- Arthur Solinap as Luis Castillo
- Vaness del Moral as Sally Castillo-Gomez
- Lucho Ayala as John
- Ervic Vijandre as Benjo

Guest cast

- Miggs Cuaderno as younger Leandro
- Roseanne Magan as younger Pauline
- Rio Locsin as Pauline's mother
- Epy Quizon as Paulo de Chavez
- Franco Laurel as Medina
- Djanin Cruz as Amy
- Camille Prats as a television show host

== Casting ==
Actor Ricky Davao was initially cast in the series, for the role of Ernesto Gomez. The role later went to actor Michael de Mesa.

== Ratings ==
According to AGB Nielsen Philippines' Mega Manila household television ratings, the pilot episode of Kahit Nasaan Ka Man earned a 24.1% rating. The final episode scored a 20.2% rating.

== Accolades ==
Accolades received by Kahit Nasaan Ka Man
| Year | Award | Category | Recipient | Result | Ref. |
|---|---|---|---|---|---|
| 2014 | 28th PMPC Star Awards for Television | Best Drama Actor | Kristofer Martin | Nominated | |
