= Marian (TV program) =

2014 Philippine television variety show

- Title card
- Genre: Variety show
- Directed by: Louie Ignacio; Mark Reyes
- Presented by: Marian Rivera
- Country of origin: Philippines
- Original language: Tagalog
- No. of seasons: 2
- No. of episodes: 25

Production
- Executive producer: Gina Quizon
- Production locations: Quezon City, Philippines
- Camera setup: Multiple-camera setup
- Running time: 42 minutes
- Production company: GMA Entertainment TV

Original release
- Network: GMA Network
- Release: June 21 – December 6, 2014

Marian is a 2014 Philippine television variety show broadcast by GMA Network. Directed by Louie Ignacio and Mark A. Reyes, it was hosted by Marian Rivera. It premiered on June 21, 2014. The show concluded on December 6, 2014, with a total of 25 episodes.

== Hosts ==
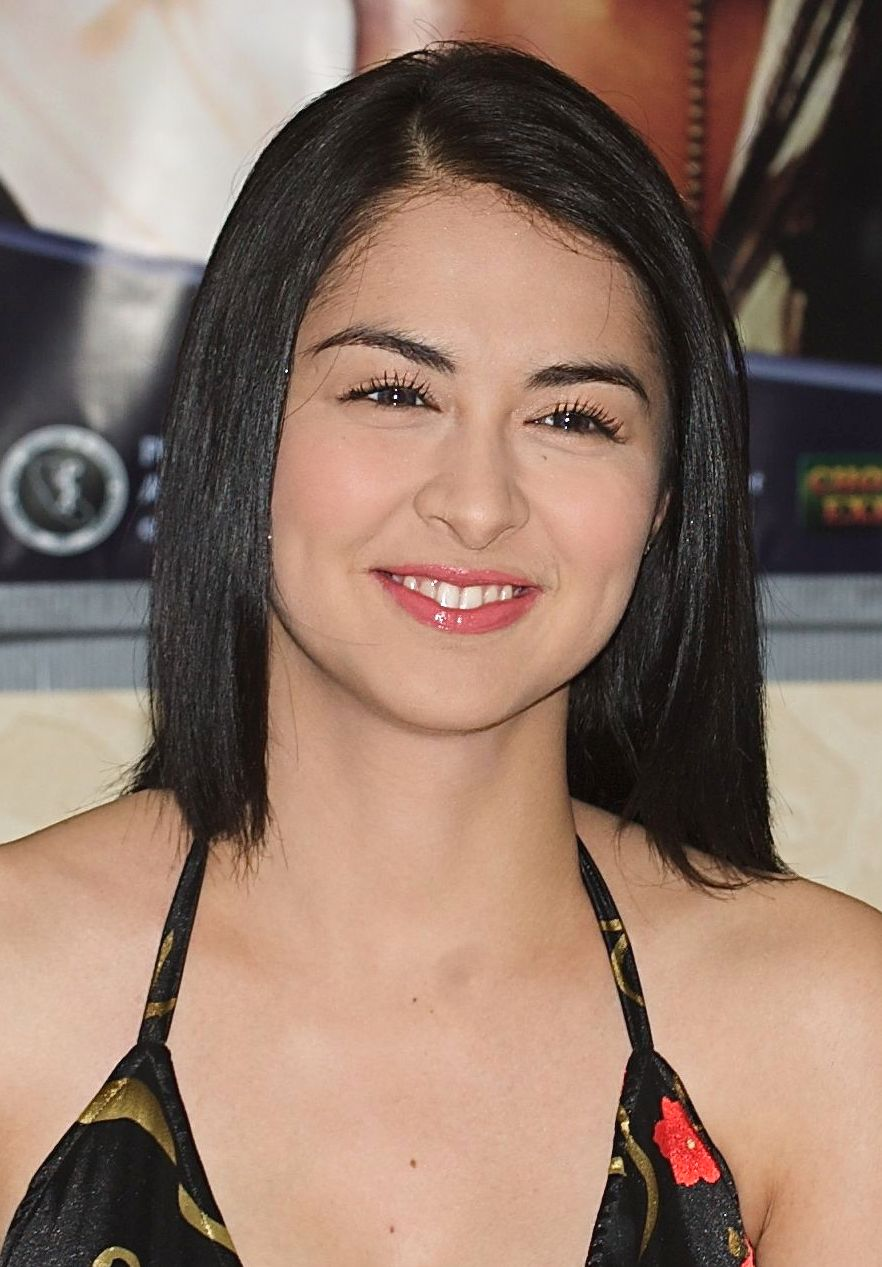
Marian Rivera serves as a host.

- Marian Rivera

Co-hosts

- Julie Anne San Jose
- Christian Bautista
- Mark Bautista (season 1)
- Paolo Ballesteros (season 1)

== Ratings ==
According to AGB Nielsen Philippines' Mega Manila household television ratings, the pilot episode of Marian earned a 21.5% rating. The final episode scored a 20.4% rating. The show got its highest rating on August 9, 2014 with a 27.1% rating which featured Dingdong Dantes' marriage proposal to Marian Rivera.

== Accolades ==
Accolades received by Marian
Year	Award	Category	Recipient	Result	Ref.
2014	28th PMPC Star Awards for Television	Best Musical Variety Show	Marian	Nominated	
