= Barangay 143 =

Philippine television series

- Title card
- Genre: Sports drama
- Created by: Katski Flores
- Written by: Katski Flores
- Directed by: Jyotirmoy Saha
- Opening theme: "Dito Sa Barangay 143" by "Gloc-9" and "Maya"
- Composer: Ricky Ho
- Countries of origin: Singapore; Philippines; Japan
- Original languages: English; Tagalog
- No. of seasons: 2
- No. of episodes: 26

Production
- Executive producers: Jyotirmoy Saha; Bernard Chong; Yutaka Imai; Takahiro Kishimoto
- Producers: Jackeline Chua; Regina Salvador
- Editors: Jason Baldorado; Aymer Alquinto; Kenneth Diaz
- Running time: 21 minutes
- Production companies: ASI Animation Studio; Shin-Ei Animation

Original release
- Network: GMA Network
- Release: October 21, 2018 – June 30, 2019
- Network: POPTV
- Release: December 12, 2020 – February 27, 2021

Barangay 143 (Japanese: バランガイ 143, Hepburn: Barangai 143) is a Philippine television drama series broadcast by GMA Network. Produced by ASI Animation Studio and Shin-Ei Animation, it premiered on October 21, 2018.

Voice cast includes Migo Adecer, Julie Anne San Jose, Ruru Madrid, Kelley Day, John Arcilla, Edu Manzano and Cherie Gil. The series is a coming of age story of a young Filipino man with Korean descent, who goes to Manila to search for his long-lost father, all while he enters a basketball league at a barangay in Tondo.

The series was released on Netflix and Pop TV. A second season was announced on November 28, and was released on December 12, 2020, on Pop TV.

== Premise ==
Two years before the start of the series, Roberto "Coach B" Sebastián, Sr.'s son, Roberto "Basti" Sebastián Jr., was killed by a gunman from a large syndicate which brought down the Barangay 143's Powerhouse team and led to today's events.

Bren Park, a player for a Korean basketball team, had recently lost his family in a tragic accident during a snowstorm in South Korea that led him to quit basketball. However, following a revelation that he was his mother's child to a Filipino man, Bren went to Manila to search for him. Along the way, he joined a local basketball team, the Puzakals of Barangay 143.

== Cast and characters ==
Cast

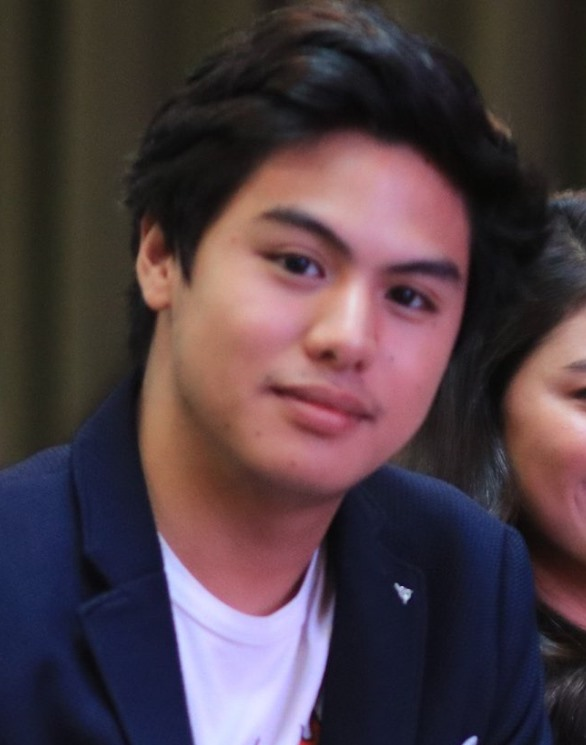
Migo Adecer

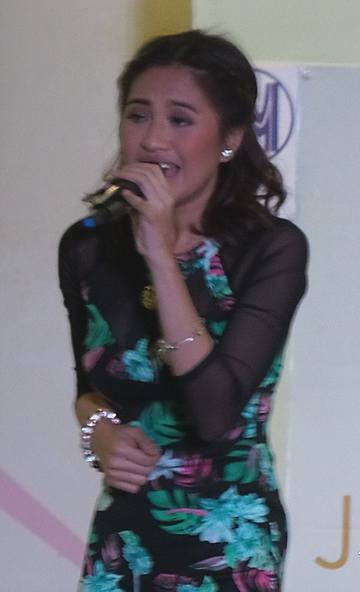
Julie Ann San Jose

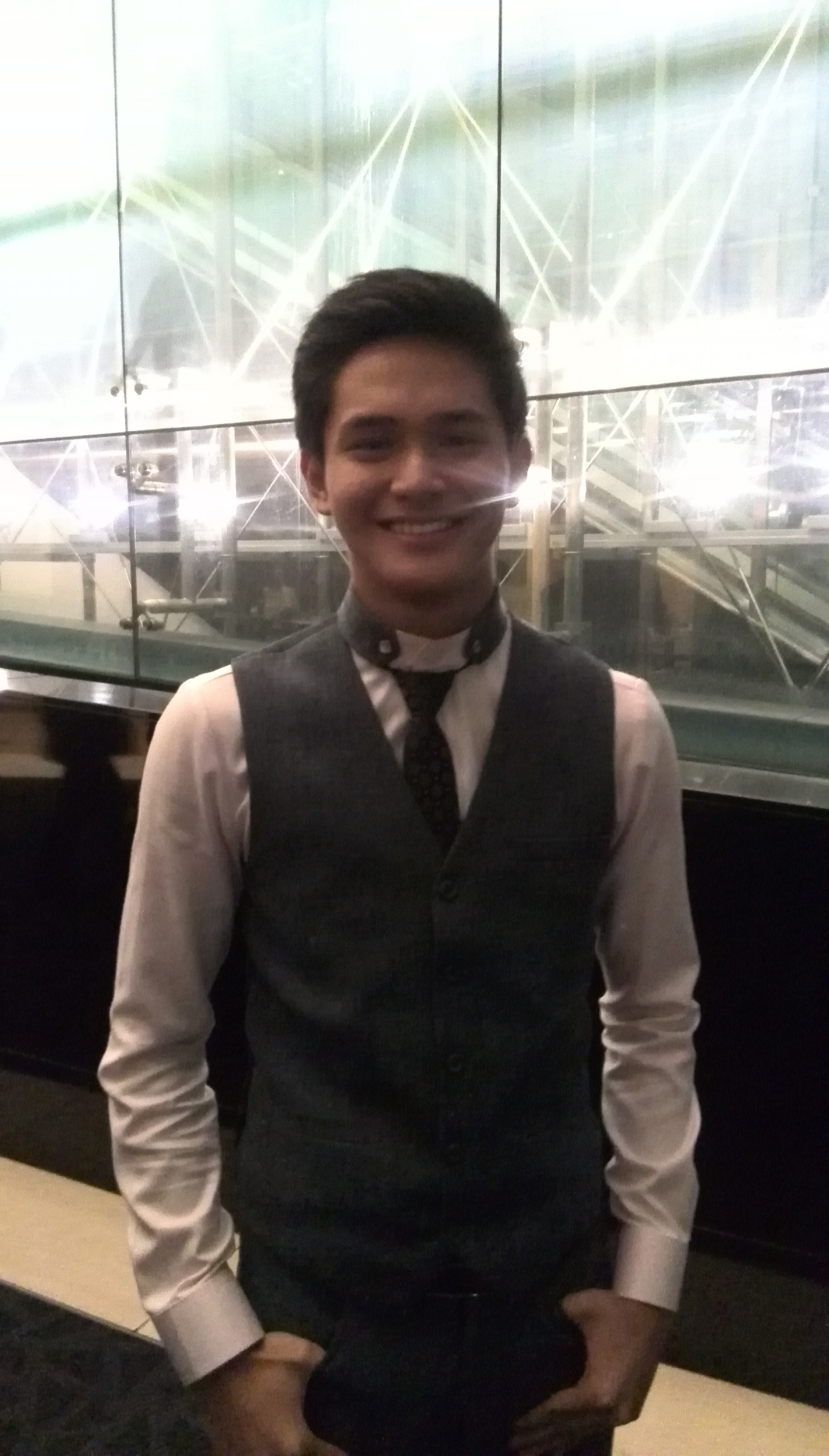
Ruru Madrid

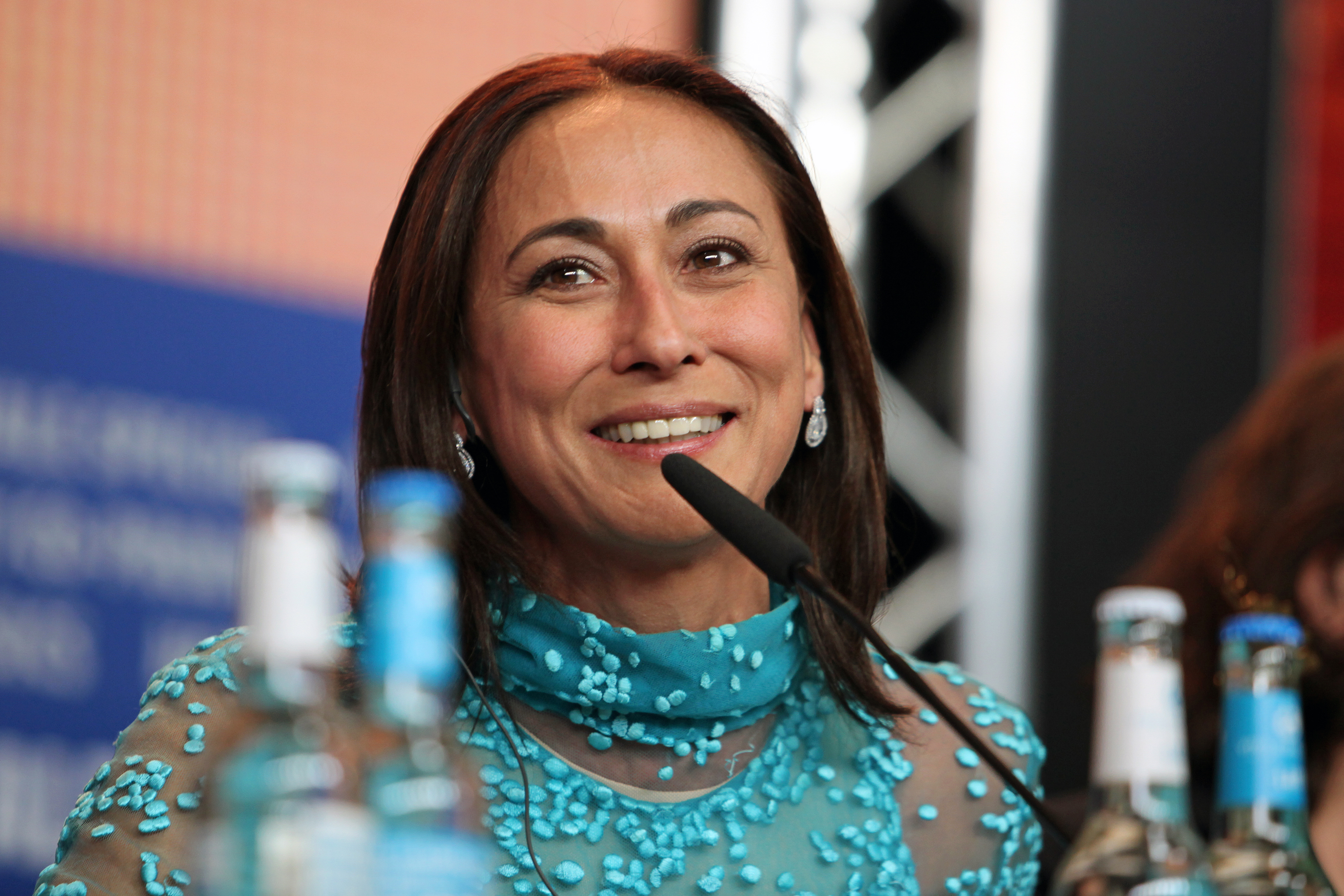
Cherie Gil

Lead cast

- Migo Adecer as Bren T. Park

Supporting cast

- Julie Anne San Jose s Victoria "Vicky" Sebastián
- Ruru Madrid as Joaquín "Wax" Rivera
- Kelley Day as Jinri Choi
- John Arcilla as Roberto "Coach B / Bobby" Sebastián Sr.
- Edu Manzano as Jack "Jumping" Rivera
- Cherie Gil as Sophia Rivera
- Paolo Contis as Koboy Guerrero
- Raver Eda as Buchoy
- Kendra Kramer as Dara T. Park
- Lorna Tolentino as Baby Dela Cruz
- Kimpoy Feliciano as Ipe Aguilar
- Gabbi Garcia as Melody
- Teresa Loyzaga as Yumi's mom
- Cheska Garcia as younger Sophia
- Pen Medina as Danny "Dandoy" Chan
- Archie Alemania as Shugo Sikat
- Doug Kramer as younger "Jumping" Jack Rivera
- Jaime Fabregas as Caloy / Grandmaster
- Rodfil Obeso Macasero as Junior Hernando
- Jerald Napoles as Chikoy Poh
- Benjie Paras by Abdul Salik
- Antonio Aquitania as Norman Nazareno

== Production ==
Quezon City-based ASI Studios, a joint venture between Philippine firm Synergy88 and Singaporean company August Media Holdings served as the production companies of the series. TV Asahi was responsible for the series' direction and character designs. ASI Studios handled the script and led the production. It was described by the producers as a "360-degree concept" and a story of love, hubris, drama, crime and basketball.

The anime series was initially produced in Tagalog feauring a celebrity voice cast. In July 2018, the voice cast was announced, along with a release date and a television network to air to.

== Episodes ==
=== Season 1 (2018–19) ===
No.	Title	Original release date
1	"Mr. Unstoppable"	October 21, 2018
Coach B (Roberto "Bobby" Sebastián, Sr.) visits the grave of his son, Basti (Roberto "Basti" Sebastián, Jr.) who was slain by a gun for hire two years before the first game of the season for Barangay 143's Basketball Team, the Puzakals. He mentioned that a new player will be coming soon to their aid. However, the Puzakals fought Barangay 369's Oso Negros without him and it resulted to failures that lead to an embarrassing loss for Barangay 143. Meanwhile Bren Park travels to the Philippines, and while on travel he reminiscence the tragedies that happened to him, especially the defeat of the Korean National Team, the death of most of the Park family due to a car accident that happened during the game due to an ongoing snowstorm, and the planned takeover of their business partners on the Park family's share on the Supermarket business.
2	"The Truth about You"	October 28, 2018
After the death of the Park family following an accident due to the Snowstorm that hit Korea during the game, Bren attended the funeral services for his family. He was also being told not only to sell his share to the supermarket business, but also to sell his insurance and the house mortgage so that he could continue his education. He was then given a last will and testament for him and for a former family employee and his former nanny, Baby Dela Cruz. Days after fixing his things and before leaving Korea, he played his last game where they were defeated by the Chinese National Team by a point, quit the National Team, committed a suicide attempt through a vehicular accident by being hit over by a delivery van, and vowed never to play the sport. After the game, he went to the Family Grave where he met Lee Sandara, Dara's godmother and Park Yumi's childhood friend, who revealed that his identity as a Korean Filipino since his biological father was not really Park Jinho through his Mother's Love letter in Filipino. He arrived at Manila, Metro Manila, Philippines and went directly to his former nanny's house who became the current Ward Captain of Barangay 143. Meanwhile, Vicky was running errands and recruiting potential team members and she was got hit by the car of Wax's teammate at one of the Barangay's intersecting streets. The next day he was accidentally awakened by a ball that entered the house from the early morning Puzakals' training in which Vicky attempted to retrieve it that led to an accidental meeting with Bren once more.
3	"Welcome To Korea"	November 4, 2018
During the night when Bren arrived back to the Philippines, Barangay 38's Green Monkeys had a practice for an upcoming match. Danny "Dandoy" Chan watched the practice and gave a lollipop to the Coach's daughter, Letty. Dandoy then revealed his intention in making the team subscribe again to Match fixing for its upcoming, game and their Coach commanded the captain that the training is already finished and to take his daughter to school and rejects the proposal. The blackmailer then said that a certain person would be angry and later, he proceeded to a car giving a bagful of money. The next day Bren was awakened by accident and saw Vicky and greeted her. However, she was angry to Bren which provoked some of the Puzakals attempting to punch Bren yet this was stopped by Kapitana Baby who wondered what happened in Korea. It was revealed that 2 years ago when they were both in Middle School, Bren was part of the Korean Delegation and Team for the Asian Youth Goodwill Hoops hosted by Korea and Vicky was from the Filipino Delegation and Team for the said event. They accidentally met the first time due to Bren was rushing to the nearest toilet and Vicky took an offer of Ice Cream. He bumped on her, spilling the ice cream on her face and asking sorry on which she didn't accept. He later greeted her "Welcome to Korea!" On a Finals Match, the Filipino Youth National Team is ahead of the Korean Youth National Team, and she was cheering for the Philippines and saw him on court then resorted to jeering Korea. Korea won by a point after he passed through Wax's defense. Later at an Incentive Dinner Event, Vicky received her brother's Valour Award and Final Buzzer due to his untimely death. After the dinner, Bren was supposed to see Vicky but bumped on to Wax who called him "engot" (which means "stupid" in Filipino) and thought it means friend whereas he was made a fool for lack of knowledge in Filipino. He saw her practicing shooting in a trash bin by using pebbles. Since he wanted to be friends with her, he accidentally called her a fool instead of a friend which she angrily corrects and they had a competition where he lost to Vicky and admitted that he is a big fan of Basti. On their field trip at Nami Island, Bren treated her with an Ice Cream as a compromise since he lost. The next days in Korea, Bren courted her and gifted her with several packages with ultimately confessing to her at Seoul Station but they did not meet again. Later, Kapitana opened her Carinderia and Bren asked her permission to go to the Sari-sari store (Filipino-style Convenience Store) and she reluctantly agreed due to his safety and naïveté since he was almost got hit by a pedicab. He went out and met drunkards on which he was protected by a kid nicknamed Buchoy. He asked Buchoy to guide him to the convenience store that ends up in busting him that he will attempt to court again Vicky.
4	"Tapsing Koreano"; Transliteration: "Korean Tapsi"	November 11, 2018
Bren asked Buchoy to go where Vicky went which is the Barangay's Basketball Arena. They met again each on which Vicky owed Bren an explanation on which Buchoy mistakenly interpreted as a lover's quarrel yet at the end of the day, Bren was frustrated did not got an answer from Vicky. This prompted Buchoy to play with him Basketball in a vacant lot which he rejected. Meanwhile, Coach B meets Detective Ramirez and discussed about a syndicate's involvement on his son's death and that person involved was revealed as Danny "Dandoy" Chan, a Chinese Filipino who barely speak Philippine Hokkien well. The next day, Bren was jogging around Barangay 143 and was almost got hit by Wax's sports car. Wax and Bren meet each other again which the latter first apologised and recognised the former for playing a prank back then in Korea. Due to his anger after being called as "Mister Engot" after meeting Bren, he went back home and played basketball in which lost against his father, Commissioner Jack Rivera. Meanwhile, Vicky recruited Bugsy to their team as their captain. After jogging, he helped his former nanny in her Tapsilog Carinderia's business by cooking and adding the Bibimbap to their menu which gained popularity for the Carinderia and was dubbed as "Tapsing Koreano" (Korean Tapsilog). In the evening, Lee Sandara send more packages that Bren left in Korea and reminded to make Philippines his home, just what like she did to Kenya where she is a University Faculty. As the days passed by, Bren continued to help in the Tapa Carinderia which end up having long queues due to its popularity. It was then noticed by Coach B the potential of Bren in being as a member of the Barangay's basketball team during his cooking but was cut short when he was notified that Vicky and Bugsy were detained at the Tondo Police Station by a Police Operation when they were about to pass the PIBA Application Form for him. Vicky was then bailed out of the jail and it was revealed that Bugsy was a pickpocket. It was revealed that Wax bailed Vicky out due to her father. Coach B then replayed the KOR vs. PHI match from 2 years ago and decided to recruit Bren which Vicky thought that it was a bad idea due to her personal relationship with him, but Coach B was certain since he lives and works with Kapitana Baby. Bren had a nightmare during his siesta which Kapitana Baby woke him and reminded to unpack a package from Korea. While unpacking, he saw a picture of his mother with several men from 18 years ago.
5	"Basketball on the Side"	November 18, 2018
Last night, Coach B went to a bar and had a conversation with Dandoy to make his team, the Puzakals be part of the teams to be involved in the game fixing in PIBA, secretly was done to bring justice for his son, on which he (Dandoy) vehemently denied any involvement. The next day, Coach B ordered Pajeon at Tapsiturbee in which he noticed Bren's footwork and cooking which are both appealing and asked if he's interested with Bren replying he's no longer interested. After serving at the carinderia, Bren went to the local Computer shop and he met Buchoy where he created a Missing Person Internet meme in which he uploaded in the SNS where Choi Jinri commented that he missed Bren which prompted her to call and apologise to him. Later that day, Coach B asked his mentor Coach Caloy about his plan where Coach Caloy reluctantly agreed. Whilst Coach B was talking to his mentor, Vicky was angered by Koboy since Koboy was fanboying all day about Bren's skills in basketball where he watched it in YouTube. Coach B ordered his lunch Bibimbap at Tapsiturbee on which he appealed to Bren and to no avail, he was again rejected. Later, Wax returned Vicky's ballpoint pen and he said that he swore to Basti that he needs to protect Vicky at all costs. Later at night, Buchoy and Bren had already two leads on his biological father's whereabouts when they were notified about Buchoy's drunken father being bullied by young children. They then fetched him to Buchoy's Houseboat in after a while Bren waited for Buchoy and had a nap where he dreamt of not saving Dara. When he woke up, he saw the houseboat was on fire and luckily, he saved Buchoy and his father from the burning houseboat. They were then rescued to the harbourside and was featured in the Local Media where Buchoy's Father blamed his son for the so-called "irresponsibly" and "pesky behaviour". Wax then saw the news in a Daily because his father reminded of the presence of Bren in the Philippines which he responded angrily. Vicky and Bren gave Buchoy relief goods and berated him for giving junk food and he casually that it was Buchoy's favourites. He was asked why she had not replied yet but she did not answer and left immediately. Later, Buchoy was being taught by Bren how to play basketball in a vacant to relieve him of his (Buchoy) sadness and anger on his father and the two was unknowingly spied by Coach B.
6	"1-4-3 Bira!"; Transliteration: "1-4-3 Go!"	November 25, 2018
Bren and Buchoy continued playing until Coach B was caught spying on Bren when he accidentally stepped on a plywood. Bren then consistently denies Coach B until a wager was agreed upon. They agreed that there will be a 1x1 basketball at the Barangay's Plaza (also known as the Old Court) nearby Tita Baby's Tapsiturbee Carinderia and the conditions were laid down that if Bren loses, he will be joining the Puzakals for a season and if Coach B loses, he will purchase 20 orders of Bibimbap. The news of the 1x1 match was spread through IM. In the 1x1 match, Bren was the one scoring first, but Coach B easily closed the gap and made the match tighter leading to the Coach's victory. Bren promised that he will start attending the training on Wednesday, 6am. After the match, Vicky was tasked to accompany Bren and Buchoy at the Araneta Center Food Park where they met a scammer who claimed knowing Yumi's friends from 18 years ago but they failed since the scammer escaped due to fear of Police Presence. PIBA rejected Coach B's plea to add Bren as one of their players due to residency and citizenship which made him meet with Kapitana Baby to create citizenship and residency certificates proving Bren is indeed a Filipino and a resident of Barangay 143 which they later submit and got the appeal approved. Before the game, Bren was facing his anxiety but it was quelled by his conscience in the form of Dara. The Puzakals faced the Bayawaks of Barangay 181 at the Seventh day of PIBA Eliminations and it was tight game where Barangay 143 dominated the 1st Quarter, the Bayawaks on the 2nd and 3rd Quarters, and Barangay 143 regaining the lead in the 4th Quarter with a matching dunk Bren to cap the game, his inaugural in the PIBA.
7	"Women's Basketball Tryout"	December 2, 2018
Bren is still hoping to find his real father and his new lead is promising but with an unpleasant twist. Vicky and Bren fights in front of the team and when things got out of control, Bren ends up saying foul remarks about her.
8	"Vicky, Puwede Ba?"; Transliteration: "Vicky, Can We?"	December 9, 2018
Wax and Vicky bonds while talking about Basti's birthday. Kpop says sorry to Vicky with the help of Buchoy and the Puzakals team. James tells Bren that Melvin is not his biological father.
9	"Uy, Shooting Star, oh!" Transliteration: "Hey, A Shooting Star!"	May 26, 2019
Vicky reminds Bren that he has a purpose in Barangay 143 when he is being dubious. Meanwhile, the team of Coach Jimmy – Green Monkey's serves as the PIBA's dark horse for the season which highly threatens the Blue Valley Lions.
10	"No Harm! No Foul!"	June 2, 2019
What makes Vicky and Wax closer is their love for the late Basti Sebastian. But with Bren in the picture and the strong dislike the Puzakal boys have for Wax, can their relationship be more than friends? Meanwhile, someone from Bren's past is coming to Tondo!
11	"She's Just My Friend"	June 9, 2019
Vicky is in denial of her jealousy towards the visitor of Bren – his ex, Jinri. Wax is to the rescue! He low-key sets up a date with Vicky.
12	"Walang Forever!"; Transliteration: "No Forever!"	June 16, 2019
As the Puzakals climb their way up to the top, Vicky and Bren's chance on love is slimming because of the arrival of Jinri and the recent confession of Wax. Meanwhile, Wax would know a secret that might change his life forever.
13	"Just Call Me Miguel"	June 23, 2019
Yumi – Mom of Bren, is craving for freedom and adventure. This leads her to deciding recklessly and leaving everything behind to chase liberation.
14	"Mahal na Mahal Kita..."; Transliteration: "I Really Love You..."	June 30, 2019
The highlight of Yumi's vacation in the Philippines is meeting the star player Jack Rivera. She goes home to Korea with a heavy heart because of how they ended up things. But, she is not expecting that things will be more difficult for her back home as a consequence of her unwise decisions.

== Release ==
Barangay 143 is primarily targeted towards the youth/young-adult market of the Philippines and was planned to be released in other Southeast Asian countries. Aside from Tagalog, Barangay 143 will also have an English-language release. It was slated to air in the Philippines in spring 2017. In July 2018, the series was set to air on GMA Network in October 2018.

TV Asahi and August Media Holdings' distribution arm – August Rights were responsible for the international distribution of the series. The series was released on the streaming service, Netflix on October 1, 2020. The series was released on the streaming service, Pop TV on November 18, 2020. A second season was announced on November 28, 2020. It was released on December 12, 2020, on the streaming service, Pop TV.

== Music ==
Most of the songs used in the series were released on the streaming service, Spotify and YouTube.

1. "Dito sa Barangay 143" – performed by Gloc-9 feat. Maya
2. "Alanganin" – performed by Kris Lawrence and Krizza Neri; composed by Thyro and Yumi
3. "Para sa Isa't Isa" – performed by Nina and JinHo Bae; composed by Vehnee Saturno
4. "Salamin" – performed by Top Suzara and Harlem Ty; written and composed by Top Suzara
5. "Liga ng Buhay" – performed by Top Suzara and Harlem Ty; composed by Thyro, Yumi and Shehyee
6. "Basketboleros" – performed by Kevin Yadao; composed by Randy Santiago
7. "Frozen in Time" – performed by Alyssa Quijano; composed by Thyro and Yum

== Ratings ==
According to AGB Nielsen Philippines' Nationwide Urban Television Audience Measurement People in Television Homes, the pilot episode of Barangay 143 earned a 4.4% rating.

== Accolades ==
Accolades received by Barangay 143
Year	Award	Category	Recipient	Result	Ref.
2019	Asian Academy Creative Awards	Best Animated Programme or Series (2D or 3D)	Barangay 143	Won	
2019	Asian Academy Creative Awards	Best Drama Series	Barangay 143	Won	
2019	Asian Academy Creative Awards	Best Theme Song or Title Theme	"Liga ng Buhay" by Top Suzara and Harlem Ty	Won	
2020	24th Asian Television Awards	Best 2D Animated Programme	Barangay 143	Won	
2020	24th Asian Television Awards	Best Theme Song	"Alanganin" Kris Lawrence and Krizza Neri	Won	
2020	24th Asian Television Awards	Best Actress in a Leading Role	Julie Anne San Jose	Nominated	

== Video game ==
Prior to the release of the anime, a video game, Barangay Basketball was released on iTunes and Google Play. It revolves around Wax, a son of a former star player, who is eager to prove that he is a player on his own right and undergoes training under the four basketball masters of Barangay 143. The video game serves as a prequel to Barangay 143. It was nominated for the People's Choice Award category of the International Mobile Gaming Awards for Southeast Asia. In October 2016, August Media Holdings announced that a subscription game with a telecommunications company would be launched.
