= List of Buena Familia episodes =

Buena Familia is a 2015 Philippine television drama series broadcast by GMA Network. It premiered on the network's Afternoon Prime line up from July 28, 2015, to March 4, 2016, replacing Yagit.

Mega Manila ratings are provided by AGB Nielsen Philippines.

== Series overview ==
Month	Episodes	Monthly Averages
Month	Episodes	Mega Manila
July 2015	4	15.7%
August 2015	21	15.9%
September 2015	22	15.6%
October 2015	22	15.9%
November 2015	21	15.9%
December 2015	23	15.8%
January 2016	21	15.1%
February 2016	21	13.9%
March 2016	4	14.2%
Total	159	15.3%

== Episodes ==
=== July 2015 ===
Episode		Original air date	Social Media Hashtag	ProdCode	AGB Nielsen Mega Manila Households in Television Homes			Ref.
Episode		Original air date	Social Media Hashtag	ProdCode	Rating	Timeslot Rank	Daytime Rank	Ref.
1	Pilot	July 28, 2015	#BuenaFamilia	1001 - A	14.6%	#1	#3	
2	All Grown Up	July 29, 2015	#BFAllGrownUp	1002 - B	16.7%	#1	#3	
3	Darling's Day	July 30, 2015	#BFDarlingsDay	1003 - C	15.7%	#1	#3	
4	Josephine Returns	July 31, 2015	#BFJosephineReturns	1004 - D	15.8%	#1	#3	

=== August 2015 ===
Episode		Original air date	Social Media Hashtag	ProdCode	AGB Nielsen Mega Manila Households in Television Homes			Ref.
Episode		Original air date	Social Media Hashtag	ProdCode	Rating	Timeslot Rank	Daytime Rank	Ref.
5	Graduation Party	August 3, 2015	#BFGraduationParty	1006 - 01 - F	14.9%	#1	#3	
6	Frenemy	August 4, 2015	#BFFrenemy	1005 - E	13.8%	#1	#5	
7	Josephine's Game	August 5, 2015	#BuenaJosephinesGame	1007 - 02 - G	15.7%	#1	#3	
8	Celine Steps Up	August 6, 2015	#BuenaCelineStepsUp	1008 - 03 - H	15.5%	#1	#4	
9	Josephine Saves Faye	August 7, 2015	#BuenaJosephineSavesFaye	1010 - 05 - J	16.0%	#1	#3	
10	Bahay ni Lola	August 10, 2015	#BuenaBahayNiLola	1011 - 06 - K	15.6%	#1	#4	
11	Darling's Song	August 11, 2015	#BuenaDarlingsSong	1009 - 04 - I	16.6%	#1	#3	
12	Harry's Story	August 12, 2015	#BuenaHarrysStory	1012 - 07 - L	18.0%	#1	#3	
13	Change of Heart	August 13, 2015	#BuenaChangeOfHeart	1013 - 08 - M	16.8%	#1	#3	
14	Arthur in Danger	August 14, 2015	#BuenaArthurInDanger	1014 - 09 - N	15.9%	#1	#4	
15	Bettina's Suitor	August 17, 2015	#BuenaBettinasSuitor	1016 - 11 - P	16.2%	#1	#3	
16	Darling Meets Olga	August 18, 2015	#BuenaDarlingMeetsOlga	1015 - 10 - O	14.3%	#1	#4	
17	Kevin Saves The Day	August 19, 2015	#BuenaKevinSavesTheDay	1017 - 12 - Q	15.5%	#1	#5	
18	Bagong Buhay ng Buena	August 20, 2015	#BagongBuhayNgBuena	1018 - 13 - R	16.5%	#1	#3	
19	Stay Strong, Darling!	August 21, 2015	#BuenaStayStrongDarling	1019 - 14 - S	18.2%	#1	#4	
20	Resbak ni Edwin	August 24, 2015	#BuenaResbakNiEdwin	1020 - 15 - T	16.9%	#1	#3	
21	Iris is Back	August 25, 2015	#BuenaIrisIsBack	1021 - 16 - U	15.6%	#1	#4	
22	Josephine's Evil Plan	August 26, 2015	#BuenaJosephinesEvilPlan	1022 - 17 - V	15.3%	#1	#4	
23	CJ's Identity	August 27, 2015	#BuenaCJsIdentity	1023 - 18 - W	15.3%	#1	#4	
24	Separate Ways	August 28, 2015	#BuenaSeparateWays	1024 - 19 - X	15.6%	#1	#4	
25	Pagtakas ni Arthur	August 31, 2015	#BuenaPagtakasNiArthur	1025 - 20 - Y	15.4%	#1	#4	

=== September 2015 ===
Episode		Original air date	Social Media Hashtag	ProdCode	AGB Nielsen Mega Manila Households in Television Homes			Ref.
Episode		Original air date	Social Media Hashtag	ProdCode	Rating	Timeslot Rank	Daytime Rank	Ref.
26	Harry Saves Celine	September 1, 2015	#BuenaHarrySavesCeline	1026 - 21 - Z	15.4%	#1	#3	
27	DarVin Closer	September 2, 2015	#BuenaDarVinCloser	1027 - 101 - AA	15.9%	#1	#3	
28	Darling Shines	September 3, 2015	#BuenaDarlingShines	1028 - 102 - BB	16.0%	#1	#3	
29	Something Special	September 4, 2015	#BuenaSomethingSpecial	1029 - 103 - CC	15.0%	#1	#3	
30	Jealousy	September 7, 2015	#BuenaJealousy	1030 - 104 - DD	15.1%	#1	#4	
31	Arthur in Hiding	September 8, 2015	#BuenaArthurInHiding	1031 - 105 - EE	14.9%	#1	#4	
32	Lost Family	September 9, 2015	#BuenaLostFamily	1032 - 106 - FF	15.8%	#1	#4	
33	Rebelasyon	September 10, 2015	#BuenaRebelasyon	1033 - 107 - GG	17.9%	#1	#3	
34	Bettina vs. Josephine	September 11, 2015	#BuenaBettinaVsJosephine	1034 - 108 - HH	17.2%	#1	#4	
35	Celine's Identity	September 14, 2015	#BuenaCelinesIdentity	1039 - 113 - MM	16.3%	#1	#3	
36	Pagtakas ni Bethina	September 15, 2015	#BuenaPagtakasNiBethina	1035 - 109 - II	15.5%	#1	#4	
37	Shoulder To Lean On	September 16, 2015	#BuenaShoulderToLeanOn	1036 - 110 - JJ	15.8%	#1	#4	
38	Nasaan si Faye?	September 17, 2015	#BuenaNasaanSiFaye	1037 - 111 - KK	15.6%	#1	#4	
39	Darling Fights Back	September 18, 2015	#BuenaDarlingFightsBack	1038 - 112 - LL	15.4%	#1	#4	
40	Muling Pagkikita	September 21, 2015	#BuenaMulingPagkikita	1040 - 114 - NN	14.6%	#1	#4	
41	Bae Kenneth	September 22, 2015	#BaeKennethOnBuenaFamilia	1042 - 116 - PP	15.2%	#1	#5	
42	Escape Plan	September 23, 2015	#BuenaEscapePlan	1044 - 118 - RR	16.0%	#1	#4	
43	Mga Pagsubok sa Buena	September 24, 2015	#MgaPagsubokSaBuena	1041 - 115 - OO	15.0%	#1	#4	
44	A Sister's Love	September 25, 2015	#BuenaASistersLove	1045 - 119 - SS	14.3%	#1	#5	
45	Pagtakas ni Celine	September 28, 2015	#BuenaPagtakasNiCeline	1043 - 117 - QQ	15.8%	#1	#4	
46	Pagtulong ni Kevin	September 29, 2015	#BuenaPagtulongNiKevin	1046 - 120 - TT	14.3%	#1	#4	
47	Pacoy In Love	September 30, 2015	#BuenaPacoyInLove	1047 - 121 - UU	15.5%	#1	#5	

=== October 2015 ===
Episode		Original air date	Social Media Hashtag	ProdCode	AGB Nielsen Mega Manila Households in Television Homes			Ref.
Episode		Original air date	Social Media Hashtag	ProdCode	Rating	Timeslot Rank	Daytime Rank	Ref.
48	Pagsagip	October 1, 2015	#BuenaPagsagip	1048 - 201 - VV	16.6%	#1	#4	
49	Harry Meets Pacoy	October 2, 2015	#BuenaHarryMeetsPacoy	1050 - 203 - XX	16.9%	#1	#5	
50	Unang Paghaharap	October 5, 2015	#BuenaUnangPaghaharap	1049 - 202 - WW	15.9%	#1	#5	
51	Pulubi Popstar	October 6, 2015	#BuenaPulubiPopstar	1051 - 204 - YY	14.1%	#1	#6	
52	Reunited Sisters	October 7, 2015	#BuenaReunitedSisters	1052 - 205 - ZZ	15.0%	#1	#5	
53	Familiar Face	October 8, 2015	#BuenaFamiliarFace	1053 - 206 - AAA	15.1%	#1	#6	
54	Pacoy's Advice	October 9, 2015	#BuenaPacoysAdvice	1054 - 207 - BBB	15.2%	#1	#6	
55	Darling on TV	October 12, 2015	#BuenaDarlingOnTV	1055 - 208 - CCC	17.0%	#1	#4	
56	Rivals	October 13, 2015	#BuenaRivals	1056 - 209 - DDD	15.6%	#1	#6	
57	The Interview	October 14, 2015	#BuenaTheInterview	1057 - 210 - EEE	16.5%	#1	#5	
58	Nasaan si Edwin?	October 15, 2015	#BuenaNasaanSiEdwin	1059 - 212 - GGG	15.4%	#1	#5	
59	Kevin the Hero	October 16, 2015	#BuenaKevinTheHero	1058 - 211 - FFF	17.1%	#1	#5	
60	Darling's Concert	October 19, 2015	#BuenaDarlingsConcert	1060 - 213 - HHH	16.1%	#1	#6	
61	True Love	October 20, 2015	#BuenaTrueLove	1061 - 214 - III	16.7%	#1	#6	
62	Darling's Choice	October 21, 2015	#BuenaDarlingsChoice	1062 - 215 - JJJ	16.4%	#1	#6	
63	Turbulence	October 22, 2015	#BuenaTurbulence	1063 - 216 - KKK	15.9%	#1	#4	
64	Plane Crash	October 23, 2015	#BuenaPlaneCrash	1064 - 217 - LLL	15.4%	#1	#6	
65	Bilin ni Harry	October 26, 2015	#BuenaBilinNiHarry	1065 - 218 - MMM	15.5%	#1	#5	
66	Kevin in Love	October 27, 2015	#BuenaKevinInLove	1066 - 219 - NNN	16.7%	#1	#4	
67	Worth the Wait	October 28, 2015	#BuenaWorthTheWait	1067 - 220 - OOO	15.3%	#1	#5	
68	Confused Celine	October 29, 2015	#BuenaConfusedCeline	1068 - 221 - PPP	16.1%	#1	#6	
69	Jealous Kevin	October 30, 2015	#BuenaJealousKevin	1070 - 223 - RRR	15.5%	#1	#5	

=== November 2015 ===
Episode		Original air date	Social Media Hashtag	ProdCode	AGB Nielsen Mega Manila Households in Television Homes			Ref.
Episode		Original air date	Social Media Hashtag	ProdCode	Rating	Timeslot Rank	Daytime Rank	Ref.
70	Meet Zach	November 2, 2015	#BuenaMeetZach	1069 - 301 - QQQ	15.4%	#1	#5	
71	Buena Familia Reunited	November 3, 2015	#BuenaFamiliaReunited	1071 - 303 - SSS	15.7%	#1	#5	
72	Sino si Sally?	November 4, 2015	#BuenaSinoSiSally	1072 - 304 - TTT	16.5%	#1	#5	
73	Sally Meets Arthur	November 5, 2015	#BuenaSallyMeetsArthur	1074 - 306 - VVV	15.7%	#1	#5	
74	Kevin vs. Zach	November 6, 2015	#BuenaKevinVsZach	1075 - 307 - WWW	16.2%	#1	#4	
75	Stolen Kiss	November 9, 2015	#BuenaStolenKiss	1073 - 305 - UUU	16.6%	#1	#4	
76	True Colors	November 10, 2015	#BuenaTrueColors	1076 - 308 - XXX	15.0%	#1	#4	
77	Karibal	November 11, 2015	#BuenaKaribal	1077 - 309 - YYY	15.0%	#1	#5	
78	First Date	November 12, 2015	#BuenaFirstDate	1078 - 310 - ZZZ	14.7%	#1	#4	
79	Welcome to Buena Familia	November 13, 2015	#WelcomeToBuenaFamilia	1079 - 311 - a	16.6%	#1	#5	
80	Pangarap ni Pacoy	November 16, 2015	#BuenaPangarapNiPacoy	1080 - 312 - b	15.9%	#1	#5	
81	DarVin Forever	November 17, 2015	#BuenaDarVinForever	1081 - 313 - c	16.8%	#1	#5	
82	Paparazzi	November 18, 2015	#BuenaPaparazzi	1082 - 314 - d	16.4%	#1	#5	
83	Kutob ni Celine	November 19, 2015	#BuenaKutobNiCeline	1083 -315 - e	15.2%	#1	#5	
84	Arthur Saves Sally	November 20, 2015	#BuenaArthurSavesSally	1084 - 316 - f	17.8%	#1	#5	
85	First Kiss	November 23, 2015	#BuenaFirstKiss	1085 - 317 - g	14.6%	#1	#4	
86	Insecure Olga	November 24, 2015	#BuenaInsecureOlga	1086 - 318 - h	15.8%	#1	#4	
87	Celine vs. Iris	November 25, 2015	#BuenaCelineVsIris	1087 - 319 - i	15.5%	#1	#5	
88	In a Relationship	November 26, 2015	#BuenaInARelationship	1090 - 322 - l	16.0%	#1	#5	
89	Moving On	November 27, 2015	#BuenaMovingOn	1088 - 320 - j	15.2%	#1	#5	
90	True Identity	November 30, 2015	#BuenaTrueIdentity	1089 - 321 - k	17.2%	#1	#5	

=== December 2015 ===
Episode		Original air date	Social Media Hashtag	ProdCode	AGB Nielsen Mega Manila Households in Television Homes			Ref.
Episode		Original air date	Social Media Hashtag	ProdCode	Rating	Timeslot Rank	Daytime Rank	Ref.
91	Mystery Girl	December 1, 2015	#BuenaMysteryGirl	1091 - 401 - m	17.4%	#1	#4	
92	Josephine's Lies	December 2, 2015	#BuenaJosephinesLies	1092 - 402 - n	17.0%	#1	#3	
93	Bettina is Back	December 3, 2015	#BuenaBettinaIsBack	1093 - 403 - o	17.9%	#1	#3	
94	Secrets and Lies	December 4, 2015	#BuenaSecretsAndLies	1094 - 404 - p	16.5%	#1	#5	
95	Pagdating ni Bettina	December 7, 2015	#BuenaPagdatingNiBettina	1095 - 405 - q	15.5%	#1	#4	
96	Happy Family	December 8, 2015	#BuenaHappyFamily	1096 - 406 - r	17.1%	#1	#3	
97	New Start	December 9, 2015	#BuenaNewStart	1097 - 407 - s	15.4%	#1	#3	
98	Forgiveness	December 10, 2015	#BuenaForgiveness	1098 - 408 - t	15.5%	#1	#3	
99	Lost Memories	December 11, 2015	#BuenaLostMemories	1099 - 409 - u	17.1%	#1	#3	
100	Bettina o Josephine?	December 14, 2015	#BuenaBettinaOJosephine	1100 - 410 - v	17.3%	#1	#4	
101	Away Kapatid	December 15, 2015	#BuenaAwayKapatid	1102 - 412 - x	18.7%	#1	#5	
102	Kapatawaran	December 16, 2015	#BuenaKapatawaran	1101 - 411 - w	17.2%	#1	#4	
103	Crazy Josephine	December 17, 2015	#BuenaCrazyJosephine	1103 - 413 - y	15.6%	#1	#4	
104	The Face Off	December 18, 2015	#BuenaFaceOff	1104 - 414 - z	16.1%	#1	#3	
105	The Threat	December 21, 2015	#BuenaTheThreat	1105 - 415 - aa	15.5%	#1	#5	
106	Pagbubunyag	December 22, 2015	#BuenaPagbubunyag	1106 - 416 - bb	15.4%	#1	#3	
107	Celine's Identity	December 23, 2015	#BuenaCelinesIdentity	1107 - 417 - cc	15.6%	#1	#3	
108	Christmas Party	December 24, 2015	#BuenaChristmasParty	1108 - 418 - dd	13.9%	#1	#3	
109	Uninvited Guest	December 25, 2015	#BuenaUninvitedGuest	1109 - 419 - ee	11.7%	#1	#3	
110	Ampon	December 28, 2015	#BuenaAmpon	1110 - 420 - ff	15.9%	#1	#3	
111	Nowhere to Go	December 29, 2015	#BuenaNowhereToGo	1111 - 421 - gg	14.2%	#1	#3	
112	Celine's Homecoming	December 30, 2015	#BuenaCelinesHomecoming	1112 - 422 - hh	13.8%	#1	#3	
113	Jealous Pacoy	December 31, 2015	#BuenaJealousPacoy	1114 - 423 - jj	12.3%	#1	#3	

=== January 2016 ===
Episode		Original air date	Social Media Hashtag	ProdCode	AGB Nielsen Mega Manila Households in Television Homes			Ref.
Episode		Original air date	Social Media Hashtag	ProdCode	Rating	Timeslot Rank	Daytime Rank	Ref.
114	The Chase	January 1, 2016	#BuenaTheChase	BF-501	14.0%	#1	#3	
115	New Year Pasabog	January 4, 2016	#BuenaNewYearPasabog	BF-502	14.8%	#1	#3	
116	Huli Ka, Josephine!	January 5, 2016	#BuenaHuliKaJosephine	BF-503	14.4%	#1	#3	
117	Pacoy's Proposal	January 6, 2016	#BuenaPacoysProposal	BF-505	13.7%	#1	#3	
118	Harry or Pacoy?	January 7, 2016	#BuenaHarryOrPacoy	BF-506	14.1%	#1	#3	
119	Celine's Choice	January 8, 2016	#BuenaCelinesChoice	BF-514	14.8%	#1	#3	
120	The 50M Ransom	January 11, 2016	#BuenaThe50MRansom	BF-508	14.7%	#1	#3	
121	Galit ni Josephine	January 12, 2016	#BuenaGalitNiJosephine	BF-509	15.5%	#1	#3	
122	Goodbye, Celine!	January 13, 2016	#BuenaGoodbyeCeline	BF-510	15.5%	#1	#3	
123	Tunay na Ina	January 14, 2016	#BuenaTunayNaIna	BF-507	19.9%	#1	#3	
124	Dugo ni Arthur	January 15, 2016	#BuenaDugoNiArthur	BF-511	19.2%	#1	#3	
125	Celine's Mom	January 18, 2016	#BuenaCelinesMom	BF-512	15.4%	#1	#3	
126	Bettina Finds Out	January 19, 2016	#BuenaBettinaFindsOut	BF-515	14.0%	#1	#3	
127	Broken Trust	January 20, 2016	#BuenaBrokenTrust	BF-516	14.7%	#1	#3	
128	A Mother's Right	January 21, 2016	#BuenaAMothersRight	BF-513	14.9%	#1	#3	
129	Paglayo ng Loob	January 22, 2016	#BuenaPaglayoNgLoob	BF-517	14.9%	#1	#3	
130	Protective Cocoy	January 25, 2016	#BuenaProtectiveCocoy	BF-518	15.2%	#1	#4	
131	I am your Mother	January 26, 2016	#BuenaIAmYourMother	BF-519	14.4%	#1	#3	
132	Kawawang Josephine	January 27, 2016	#BuenaKawawangJosephine	BF-520	13.7%	#1	#3	
133	Sampal ni Bettina	January 28, 2016	#BuenaSampalNiBettina	BF-521	14.6%	#1	#3	
134	Bagong Pagsubok	January 29, 2016	#BuenaBagongPagsubok	BF-523	14.5%	#1	#3	

=== February 2016 ===
Episode		Original air date	Social Media Hashtag	ProdCode	AGB Nielsen Mega Manila Households in Television Homes			Ref.
Episode		Original air date	Social Media Hashtag	ProdCode	Rating	Timeslot Rank	Daytime Rank	Ref.
135	Josephine Kills	February 1, 2016	#BuenaJosephineKills	BF-602	15.9%	#1	#3	
136	Patawad, Anak!	February 2, 2016	#BuenaPatawadAnak	BF-604	13.1%	#1	#4	
137	Paghihiganti	February 3, 2016	#BuenaPaghihiganti	BF-605	13.6%	#1	#4	
138	Bagong Josephine	February 4, 2016	#BuenaBagongJosephine	BF-603	14.0%	#1	#3	
139	Takas o Sagip?	February 5, 2016	#BuenaTakasOSagip	BF-606	15.2%	#1	#3	
140	The Big Shootout	February 8, 2016	#BuenaTheBigShootout	BF-601	15.5%	#1	#3	
141	Rescue Mission	February 9, 2016	#BuenaRescueMission	BF-607	14.4%	#1	#3	
142	Jealous Mother	February 10, 2016	#BuenaJealousMother	BF-608	14.2%	#1	#3	
143	Agaw Buhay	February 11, 2016	#BuenaAgawBuhay	BF-611	13.8%	#1	#3	
144	Tagapagligtas	February 12, 2016	#BuenaTagapagligtas	BF-609	14.2%	#1	#3	
145	Kevin's Dilemma	February 15, 2016	#BuenaKevinsDilemma	BF-610	13.1%	#1	#4	
146	Paglilihim ni Celine	February 16, 2016	#BuenaPaglilihimNiCeline	BF-612	13.7%	#1	#4	
147	Pagsuway sa Utos	February 17, 2016	#BuenaPagsuwaySaUtos	BF-613	13.7%	#1	#4	
148	Ang Kasunduan	February 18, 2016	#BuenaAngKasunduan	BF-614	13.3%	#1	#4	
149	Suicidal Josephine	February 19, 2016	#BuenaSuicidalJosephine	BF-618	13.2%	#1	#6	
150	Mother to Mother	February 22, 2016	#BuenaMotherToMother	BF-615	15.1%	#1	#3	
151	Bettina's Sad B-day	February 23, 2016	#BuenaBettinasSadBDay	BF-616	12.3%	#1	#5	
152	The Uninvited	February 24, 2016	#BuenaTheUninvited	BF-617	13.1%	#1	#5	
153	Angry Bettina	February 25, 2016	#BuenaAngryBettina	BF-620	13.6%	#1	#6	
154	Kardo is Back	February 26, 2016	#BuenaKardoIsBack	BF-622	13.3%	#1	#6	
155	Duguan si Pacoy	February 29, 2016	#BuenaDuguanSiPacoy	BF-618	14.0%	#1	#4	

=== March 2016 ===
Episode		Original air date	Social Media Hashtag	ProdCode	AGB Nielsen Mega Manila Households in Television Homes			Ref.
Episode		Original air date	Social Media Hashtag	ProdCode	Rating	Timeslot Rank	Daytime Rank	Ref.
156	Paalam, Pacoy!	March 1, 2016	#BuenaPaalamPacoy	BF-701	13.0%	#1	#4	
157	Huli Ka!	March 2, 2016	#BuenaHuliKa	BF-703	13.5%	#1	#4	
158	Pagpapatawad	March 3, 2016	#BuenaPagpapatawad	BF-702	14.7%	#1	#5	
159	Finale	March 4, 2016	#BuenaFamiliaFinale	BF-704	15.5%	#1	#4	
