= Buena Familia =

Philippine television drama series

- Title card
- Genre: Drama
- Created by: R.J. Nuevas
- Written by: R.J. Nuevas; Zita Garganera; Jules Katanyag; Pam Miras
- Directed by: Gil Tejada Jr.
- Creative director: Roy Iglesias
- Starring: Kylie Padilla; Julie Anne San Jose
- Theme music composer: Tata Betita
- Opening theme: "Nasaan ang Dating Tayo" by Julie Anne San Jose
- Country of origin: Philippines
- Original language: Tagalog
- No. of episodes: 159 (list of episodes)

Production
- Executive producer: Arlene D. Pilapil
- Editors: Joseph Nieva; Lawrence "Kish" Villena; A.C. Damaso
- Camera setup: Multiple-camera setup
- Running time: 22–31 minutes
- Production company: GMA Entertainment TV

Original release
- Network: GMA Network
- Release: July 28, 2015 – March 4, 2016

Buena Familia (transl. Buena family) is a Philippine television drama series broadcast by GMA Network. Directed by Gil Tejada Jr., it stars Kylie Padilla and Julie Anne San Jose. It premiered on July 28, 2015, on the network's Afternoon Prime line up. The series concluded on March 4, 2016, with a total of 159 episodes.

The series is streaming online on YouTube.

== Premise ==
The Buena family is wealthy and respected by society. When Arthur Buena's mistress comes back for revenge to Arthur and his family, she will succeed and change the lives of the Buena family. The Buena siblings will be separated, and Celine being the eldest will find a way to make them whole again.

== Cast and characters ==
Cast

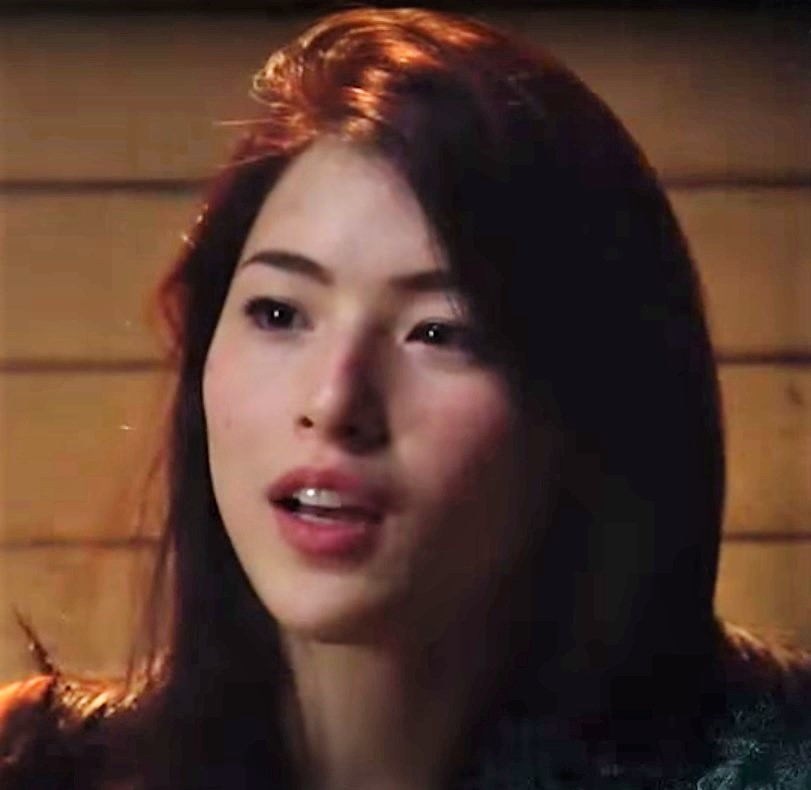
Kylie Padilla

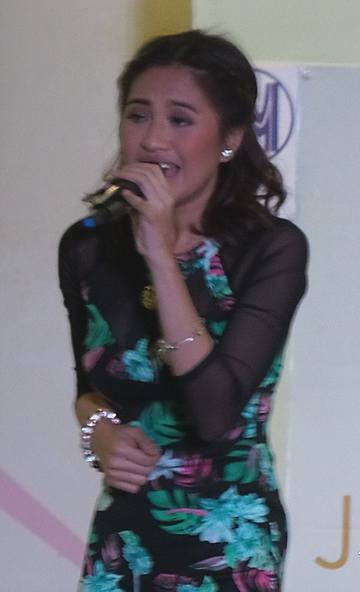
Julie Anne San Jose

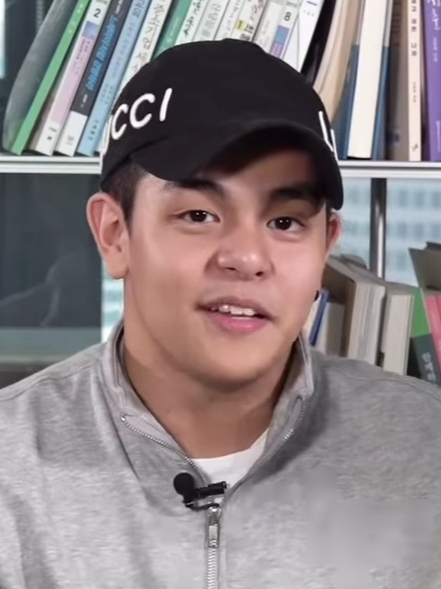
Julian Trono

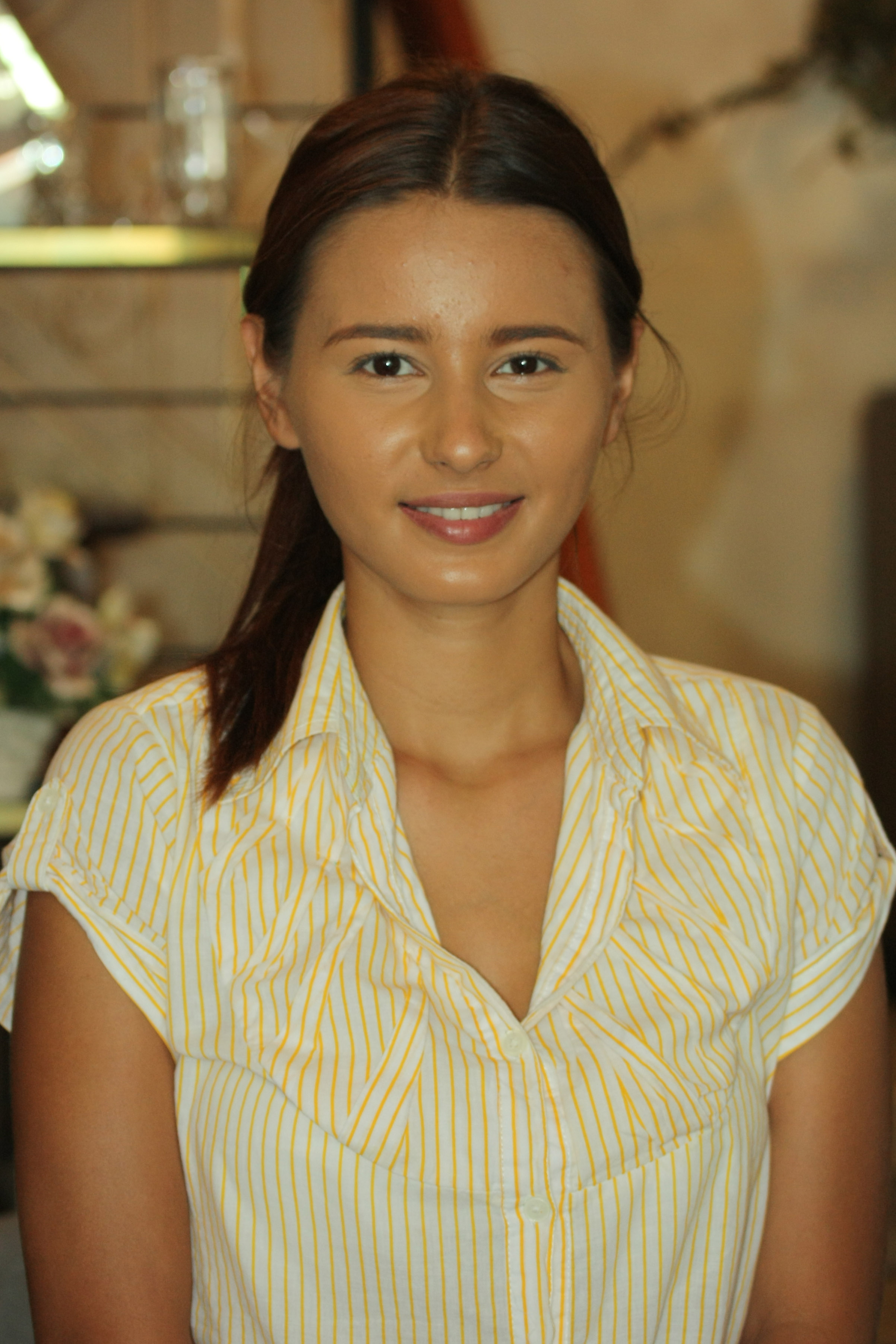
Jackie Rice

Lead cast

- Kylie Padilla as Celine Buena / Rochel C. Buena
- Julie Anne San Jose as Darlina "Darling" A. Buena

Supporting cast

- Julian Trono as Edwin A. Buena
- Mona Louise Rey as Faye A. Buena
- Angelu de Leon as Bettina Agravante-Buena / Sally Rosales
- Bobby Andrews as Arthur Buena
- Sheryl Cruz as Josephine Carter
- Jake Vargas as Kevin Acosta Vergara
- Martin del Rosario as Harry Atendido
- Jackie Rice as Iris Florencio
- Ryza Cenon as Vaness Castro
- Aicelle Santos as Olga Vergara
- Mayton Eugenio as Lauren Villacor
- Mel Kimura as Gloria Racaza
- Lou Sison as Alexis Manuel
- Tessie Tomas as Marissa Agravante

Guest cast

- Pinky Amador as Sandra Atendido
- Gerald Madrid as Marlon Abad
- Dino Guevarra as Quentin Monsanto
- Tess Bomb as Norma Sebastian
- Arianne Bautista as Pamela
- Gigi Locsin as Tonya
- Diego Llorico as Enrico Perez / Birty
- Kenneth Medrano as Pacoy Alvero
- Via Antonio as Marga Varga
- Vince Velasco as Tony Lopez
- Dan Alvaro as Kenneth Vasquez
- Marky Lopez as Utoy Velasco
- Kristoffer Martin as Zach Michaels

== Ratings ==
According to AGB Nielsen Philippines' Mega Manila household television ratings, the pilot episode of Buena Familia earned a 14.6% rating. The final episode scored a 15.5% rating.
