= My Guitar Princess =

2018 Philippine television drama series

- Title card
- Genre: Romantic drama; Musical
- Created by: Clyde Mercado; Shao Masula; Adolfo Borinaga Alix, Jr.
- Written by: Jessie Villabrille; Conan Altatis; Mario Banzon; Jerome Zamora
- Directed by: Nick Olanka
- Starring: Julie Anne San Jose
- Theme music composer: Roxy Fabian
- Opening theme: "Walang Kapalit" by Julie Anne San Jose
- Country of origin: Philippines
- Original language: Tagalog
- No. of episodes: 50

Production
- Executive producer: Sharon Rose Masula
- Cinematography: Maisa Demetillo
- Editors: Jhoan Antenor; Jerome Arataquid; John Wesly Lagdameo; Gavian Place; Genice Panuncio; Erdy Tibayan
- Camera setup: Multiple-camera setup
- Running time: 17–25 minutes
- Production company: GMA News and Public Affairs

Original release
- Network: GMA Network
- Release: May 7 – July 13, 2018

My Guitar Princess is a 2018 Philippine television drama romance musical series broadcast by GMA Network. Directed by Nick Olanka, it stars Julie Anne San Jose in the title role. It premiered on May 7, 2018, on the network's afternoon line up. The series concluded on July 13, 2018, with a total of 50 episodes.

The series is streaming online on YouTube.

== Premise ==
Celina, a daughter of a house help became famous online as the "Guitar Princess". Her mother was a former singer and was an employee of the Canadian Ambassador to the Philippines who had a Filipino wife and a son, Elton - Celina's childhood friend. They will eventually meet again, when Elton comes across a video of the Guitar Princess and instantly becomes a fan.

== Cast and characters ==
Cast

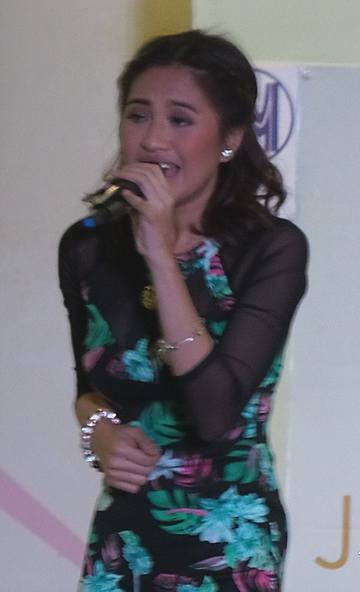
Julie Anne San Jose

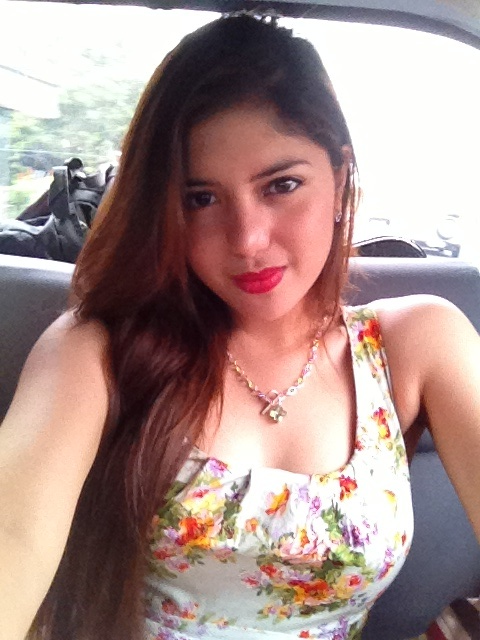
Isabella de Leon

Lead cast

- Julie Anne San Jose as Celina Raymundo-Soriano / Guitar Princess

Supporting cast

- Gil Cuerva as Elton Smith
- Kiko Estrada as Justin Garcia
- Sheryl Cruz as Adele Raymundo-Soriano
- Isabelle de Leon as Taylor Garcia / Guitar Empress
- Jazz Ocampo as Katy Garcia
- Kier Legaspi as Elvis Soriano
- Marc Abaya as Charlie
- Maey Bautista as Dolly
- Marika Sasaki as Britney
- Ralf King as Adam
- Rob Sy as Michael

Guest cast

- Frank Garcia as George
- Lui Manansala as Barbara
- Ex Battalion as themselves
- Mickey Ferriols as Mariah
- Jervy "Patani" Daño as Shakira
- Marissa Sanchez as Janet
- Althea Ablan as Kim
- Petite as Whitney
- Venice Bismonte as younger Celina
- Bryce Eusebio as younger Elton

== Production ==
Principal photography commenced in April 2018.

== Ratings ==
According to AGB Nielsen Philippines' Nationwide Urban Television Audience Measurement People in television homes, the final episode of My Guitar Princess scored a 4.4% rating.
