= List of Julie Anne San Jose concerts =

Julie Anne San Jose Concerts
- Solo concerts: 16
- Co-headlining concerts: 19
- GMA Pinoy TV Concert Series: 15
- Supporting act: 7

Filipino singer Julie Anne San Jose has headlined 16 solo concerts worldwide, co-headlined 19 concerts and has performed as a supporting acts to various local and international artists.

She has also performed 15 international concerts with other Kapuso artists for GMA Pinoy TV.

== Live and virtual concerts ==
=== Headlining concerts ===
Solo Concerts
Date	Title	Venue	Country
April 10, 2011	Spread the Love, Live!	Stone House Hotel	Philippines
February 18, 2012	From the Heart in Cebu	St. Theresa's College Auditorium	Philippines
May 16, 2012	Julie Anne San Jose: ThanksGiving Concert	Hard Rock Cafe	Philippines
May 11, 2013	Julie Anne: It's My Time!	Music Museum	Philippines
May 25, 2013	Japs Live in L.A!	Beyond the Stars Palace	United States
June 7, 2013	Japs Live In Edna's Ichiban	120 Hazewood Drive, San Francisco	United States
December 13, 2014	Hologram	Mall of Asia Arena	Philippines
May 22, 2015	Japs Live in San Francisco!	Fort McKinley, San Francisco	United States
March 5, 2016	Japs Live in Bacolod!	SMX Convention Center	Philippines
May 14, 2016	In Control! (10th Anniversary Concert)	New Frontier Theater	Philippines
January 27, 2018	#Julie	The Music Museum	Philippines
July 20, 2019	Julie Sings the Divas	The Theater at Solaire	Philippines
September 17, 2021	Limitless, A Musical Trilogy: Breathe	Various locations in Mindanao	Philippines
November 20, 2021	Limitless, A Musical Trilogy: Heal	Various locations in Visayas	Philippines
March 20, 2022	Limitless Live!	Bonifacio Global City	Philippines
April 9, 2022	Limitless, A Musical Trilogy: Rise	Various locations in Luzon	Philippines

=== Co-headlining concerts ===
Co-Headlining Concerts
Date	Title	Artists	Venue	Country
September 3, 2011	Beyond Limits	Jona Viray, Frencheska Farr	The Music Museum	Philippines
February 3, 2012	Proud to Be Pinoy!	Maja Salvador, Derek Ramsay, Melai Cantiveros	Dubai	United Arab Emirates
November 11, 2016	When Julie Anne Meets Christian	Christian Bautista	New Frontier Theater	Philippines
January 20, 2018	3 Stars 1 Heart	Regine Velasquez, Christian Bautista	Waterfront Cebu City Hotel & Casino, Cebu	Philippines
April 14, 2018	3 Stars 1 Heart	Regine Velasquez, Christian Bautista	CSI Stadia, Dagupan	Philippines
June 16, 2018	3 Stars 1 Heart	Regine Velasquez, Christian Bautista	Dubai World Trade Centre	United Arab Emirates
January 27, 2019	The Sweetheart and the Balladeer: Fun Night Only	Christian Bautista, Donita Nose, Super Tekla, Golden Cañedo	Iloilo Convention Center	Philippines
July 6, 2019	The Sweetheart and the Balladeer: Fun Night Only	Christian Bautista, Donita Nose, Super Tekla, Kyline Alcantara	Limketkai Center, Cagayan de Oro	Philippines
February 8, 2020	The Sweetheart and the Balladeer: Fun Night Only	Christian Bautista, Donita Nose, Super Tekla, Kyline Alcantara	Urdaneta City Cultural & Sports Center, Pangasinan	Philippines
November 26, 2022	JulieVerse	Rayver Cruz, Kyline Alcantara, Mavy Legaspi	Newport Performing Arts Theatre	Philippines
October 7, 2023	Luv Trip Na, Luff Trip Pa!: The JulieVer Concert With Boobay	Rayver Cruz, Boobay	Tel Aviv University	Israel
December 2, 2023	Queendom: Live	Rita Daniela, Hannah Precillas, Thea Astley, Jessica Villarubin, Mariane Osabel	Newport Performing Arts Theatre	Philippines
March 2, 2024	Love Bound	Erik Santos	Newport Performing Arts Theater	Philippines
July 27–28, 2024	Julie X Stell: Ang Ating Tinig	Stell Ajero of SB19	New Frontier Theater	Philippines
August 11, 2024	Love Bound	Erik Santos	The Grand Theatre (Oklahoma)	United States
December 7–8, 2024	JulieVer Live in Melbourne	Rayver Cruz	Williamstown Town Hall	Australia
December 7–8, 2024	JulieVer Live in Sydney	Rayver Cruz	Liverpool Catholic Club Ice Rink	Australia
April 25, 2025	Passport To the World	Janine Berdin, Carmelle Collado, Jennie Gabriel, Xiao Yunnah	Askan Park, Al Khobar	Saudi Arabia
July 5–6, 2025	London Barrio Fiesta	Rayver Cruz, Alden Richards	Cranford Community College, Hounslow West	United Kingdom
February 7, 2026	Love Generation - A Pre-Valentine Concert	Michael Pangilinan, Mark Rudio	Dubai World Trade Center	United Arab Emirates
April 25, 2026	Limitless: Star Beyond Boundaries Music Concert Live!	Jex de Castro	Dynasty Restaurant, Port Moresby	Papua New Guinea

=== Supporting act ===
Supporting Act
Date	Concert Title	Artist	Venue
July 18, 2011	David Archuleta Live in Manila	David Archuleta	Smart Araneta Coliseum
September 16, 2012	Manny Many Prizes US Concert	Manny Pacquiao	Universal Amphitheatre
October 6, 2015	One Asia Seoul Mega Concert	Got7, Ailee, CNBLUE, Reno Wang	Seoul Plaza, Korea
March 22, 2017	Globe: Disney Princess, I Dare to Dream Concert!	Lea Salonga, KC Concepcion, Morissette Amon, Sam Concepcion, Christian Bautista, Erik Santos, Tippy Dos Santos, Aicelle Santos	Mall of Asia Arena
October 21, 2017	R3.0 (30th Anniversary Concert)	Regine Velasquez	Mall of Asia Arena
April 26, 2024	Gary V PURE ENERGY: One Last Time!	Gary Valenciano	Mall of Asia Arena
May 12, 2024	Gen C: A Musical Offering from National Artist Ryan Cayabyab	Ryan Cayabyab	Samsung Theater
January 31, 2025	The Music of Vehnee Saturno	Vehnee Saturno	Newport Performing Arts Theater
February 18, 2026	Josh Groban: Gems World Tour 2026	Josh Groban	Mall of Asia Arena

GMA Pinoy TV Concert Series
Date	Title	Artists	Venue	Country
September 27, 2013	Kapusong Pinoy Sa Dubai	Marian Rivera, Christian Bautista, Rachelle Ann Go	Sheikh Rashid Auditorium, Dubai	United Arab Emirates
June 13, 2014	Kapusong Pinoy: Musika at Tawanan	Gladys Guevarra	Al-Arabi SC	Kuwait
September 27, 2014	Kapusong Pinoy Sa L.A	Carla Abellana, Tom Rodriguez, Miguel Tanfelix, Betong Sumaya	Redondo Beach, California	United States
November 7, 2014	Kapusong Pinoy Sa Dubai	Marian Rivera, Dingdong Dantes	Global Village, Dubai	United Arab Emirates
September 5, 2015	Kapusong Pinoy Sa New York	Dingdong Dantes, Ai-Ai delas Alas, Christian Bautista, Alden Richards, Betong Sumaya, Rita De Guzman	The Town Hall, New York City	United States
October 7, 2018	Kapusong Pinoy: Paskuhan at Kantawanan Sa Anaheim	Marian Rivera, Ai-Ai delas Alas, Christian Bautista, Donita Nose, Super Tekla	City National Grove of Anaheim	United States
May 11, 2019	Kapusong Pinoy: Studio 7 Musikalye Sa Brooklyn	Christian Bautista, Alden Richards, Rayver Cruz, Kyline Alcantara, Golden Cañedo, Betong Sumaya	Kings Theatre	United States
March 30, 2022	Stronger Together: GMA Pinoy TV at Expo 2020 Dubai	Xian Lim, Jessica Villarubin	Dubai Millennium Amphitheatre	United Arab Emirates
September 24–25, 2022	Together Again: A GMA Pinoy TV @ 17 Concert	Dingdong Dantes, Bea Alonzo, Lani Misalucha, Ai-Ai delas Alas, Rayver Cruz	Pechanga Theater, Pechanga Resort & Casino, California	United States
August 19–20, 2023	Taste Of Manila: Isang Dekada Na!	Rayver Cruz	Toronto, Bathurst street & Wilson Ave	Canada
August 26–27, 2023	Global Pinoy Caravan: Pista Ng Bayan		Robson Square, 800 Robson Street, Vancouver	Canada
April 5–7, 2024	Sparkle Tour	Rayver Cruz, Barbie Forteza, Bianca Umali, Ruru Madrid, David Licauco	Southview Alliance Church, Calgary	Canada
April 5–7, 2024	Sparkle Tour	Rayver Cruz, Barbie Forteza, Bianca Umali, Ruru Madrid, David Licauco	Toronto Pavillion, Toronto	Canada
June 16, 2024	126th Philippine Independence Day and Migrant Workers Day celebration Concert		Banqiao Gymnasium, New Taipei City	Taiwan
August 9–10, 2024	Sparkle Tour	Rayver Cruz, Alden Richards, Ai-Ai Delas Alas, Isko Moreno, Boobay	City National Grove of Anaheim, California	United States
August 9–10, 2024	Sparkle Tour	Rayver Cruz, Alden Richards, Ai-Ai Delas Alas, Isko Moreno, Boobay	South San Francisco High School Auditorium, San Francisco California	United States
October 19–21, 2024	Sparkle Tour	Rayver Cruz, Ruru Madrid, Bianca Umali, Ken Chan, Jillian Ward	Saitama Hall, Tokyo	JAPAN
