= Junior Ambassador =

Junior Ambassador is an international cultural exchange and relations organization. Junior Ambassador manages international cultural exchange programs, which are certified by government organizations to train young global leaders(youth ambassadors).

== Objective ==
The purpose of the program of Junior Ambassador is to train youth global cultural representatives, who could lead the generation of 21st-century cultural diplomacy and contribute to the happiness and development of mankind with much knowledge and love for mankind. The purpose of the Junior Ambassador program is to train youth ambassadors who would lead 21st-century cultural diplomacy and contribute to the happiness and development of mankind. Since the 26th UNESCO General Conference has adopted 'Seoul Agenda: Goals for Cultural Art Exchange', which was mainly led by the government of Republic of Korea, practicing cultural diversity, intercultural dialogue, and sustainable development became significant issues. To practice UNESCO's educational ideology, Junior Ambassador's object is to train 21st Century style leaders, who comprehend about the movement of global cultural flow and lead exchange of cultural art.

== Government Organizations in Partnership ==
British Council, ATOUT France, ENIT Italia, Switzerland embassy and Switzerland tourism are participating as partners of the Junior Ambassador program. These global partners assist in designing the program, co-hosting cultural activities and issuing the letter of credence.

== Programs ==
Junior Ambassador manages the following programs

Junior Ambassador Internship Program

Junior Ambassador Internship Program is an educational and international exchange program that cultivates youth cultural ambassadors who get trained to have abilities and knowledge, and is certified by governmental organization.

The UK Junior Ambassador Online Lecture

The British Empire, which had once conquered the world with power, now influences the world with culture. The UK Junior Ambassador introduces British literature, a powerful source of UK culture that has been recreated in the form of movies and musicals.

France Junior Ambassador Online Lecture

France Junior Ambassador online program shows how life becomes art in France in the fashion industry and culinary arts. Students can experience France, the country that established the world's first Ministry of Culture and practiced cultural policy with passion toward art. However, the Soviet Union established the first Ministry of Culture in 1936, followed by Italy (MinCulPop) in 1937. France only in 1959.

Italy Junior Ambassador Online Lecture

Italy is a country that many artists have been inspired by and have fallen in love with. Students can experience the creativeness of Italy through Italian architects and Italian Renaissance artists such as Leonardo da Vinci, Michelangelo, and Rafael.

Switzerland Junior Ambassador Online Lecture

Switzerland is a country best noted for its tourism. The world's first hospitality institute was created here as well as the world's first mountain train, wheel train and panoramic cable car. Students can find out the secrets of Swiss education and discover how its educational environment has produced many Nobel Prize winners and how the country overcame environmental issues to be competitive in tourism.

Dreaming Ambassador School

Dreaming Ambassador School targets on every elementary and middle school. It is a relay special program that various experts of the world organization, foreign governmental organization, and professional people in both domestic and foreign countries participate.

Cultural Youth School

Cultural Youth School is a program for training global leaders through creative activities in elementary and middle school, afterschool curriculum, and Saturday School. It provides both creativity and global citizenship simultaneously as 21st Century requested. Moreover, it manages the intensive course of Junior Ambassador Internship certified by foreign governmental organization.

Mentor School

A social learning program that is managed by sharing knowledge of Mentors in Junior Ambassador's Mentor Community. The first step is that Lee O Young, Koreas' first Minister of Culture, gives an online special lecture. Furthermore, there are special lectures, "100 minutes of journey-round-world trip" by former and current ambassador, called 'Master Ambassador'.

Cultural Experience Program

To promote understanding about the world culture, build up global citizenship, creativity and capacity of blending, Junior Ambassador processes the Cultural Experience Event with governmental organization as cosponsors and experts in many different fields. The Cultural Experience Event runs as contribution of public welfare and any adolescents can participate.

- 'Swiss Design: Criss+Cross' with Switzerland Embassy in Korea ’
- 'Feel Europe Festival' with four European Governmental Organizations
- French Christmas Party with the director of ATOUT France
- 'Swiss Weeks in Seoul' at the Embassy of Switzerland in Korea and SongEun Artspace
- Earth Day 'Global Leadership' Event with a chief of Georgia Department of Economic Development Korea Office
- 'Swiss Media Artist Talk' with the Embassy of Switzerland in Korea
- Belle France with Institut Français Séoul
- Cine France with Institut Français Séoul
- 'Learning etiquette through Japanese tea ceremony culture' with the Communication Culture Center at the Embassy of Japan in Korea, adolescent invited ceremony
- 'German Tales by Grimm Brothers' with Embassy of Germany in Seoul
- 'Viva Latin America' with Embassy of Mexico in Korea
- 'Junior Ambassador Nomination' and round table meeting with Embassy of Switzerland

Reference Book

UK, France, Italy and Switzerland textbook came out with the content of Junior Ambassador Internship Educational Course. Students, who did not participate in the Internship Program, are also available to apply Ambassador certified test.

== Test and Certifying Procedure ==
The purpose of Junior Ambassador's tests is to evaluate the intelligence, sensitivity and personality of candidates and the capability of global leaders (youth ambassadors) based on the values of education for sustainable development. All children under 14 years of age can apply for the tests. The 1st test will process as multiple-choice tests and the 2nd test will be an essay test. A Letter of Credence, certified by governmental organizations, will be given to those students who pass the last 2nd test. Specific information about the Junior Ambassador tests can be found on the Junior Ambassador Homepage.

== Activity of an Appointee ==
Students, who passed the Junior Ambassador's certified test and appointed by the government, start the real activity. Firstly, they will receive the Letter of Credence of Cultural Ambassador that was signed by the director of governmental organization and have a chance to get round-table meeting with the director. In addition, appointers will get an invitation from various VIP events so that they can represent as youth leaders of the country they have joined.

== Features ==
Cultural Activities with Foreign Government Organizations and Artists
The Junior Ambassador program offers high grade cultural experiences on a monthly basis in partnership with government organizations and international and local artists. At the events, the participants can build relationships with representatives of foreign government agencies and artists. Additionally, participants can learn to develop vision and embrace the challenge to become global leaders.

Letter of Credence, Certified by Foreign Government Organizations
A Letter of Credence, certified by foreign government organizations, will be given to those students who complete the program and pass the essay test. Successful candidates will have the priority of participating in events organized by foreign government organizations. Excellent students among the candidates can become honorary Junior Ambassadors and the best honorary Junior Ambassador will receive an opportunity to study abroad once every year.

Culture and Art Education for Sustainable Development
Students can learn geography, history, and general knowledge from around the globe, as well as get online and offline education on the culture and art of each country. This education fulfills one of the UNESCO's core agendas, 'cultural diversity'.

Self-Directed Learning Program
Junior Ambassadors have an advantage over self-directed learners. This is because the online course is designed to attract children to study on their own by piquing their curiosity about foreign culture. The letter of credence, issued by foreign government organizations, can be useful during interviews for school entry, especially for the children who dream of being a diplomat, a U.N. secretary-general or an artist.

== Mentor Community ==
The Ambassador Society is an international exchange community which performs the role of mentor for Junior Ambassadors. They are composed of professionals from various sectors in Korea and they support a new paradigm of culture and art education.

1. Senior Ambassador: Senior Ambassador Lee O Young, Koreas' first Minister of Culture, gives lectures for the Junior Ambassador program on global leadership and he instructs how to maintain one's own identity in a multicultural society.
2. Global Ambassador: Global Ambassadors consist of representatives of four European government organizations. They support and participate in Junior Ambassador cultural activities.
3. Culture Ambassador: Culture Ambassadors consist of world-leading contemporary artists. They motivate Junior Ambassadors in terms of creativity.
4. Academic Ambassador: Academic Ambassadors consist of four professors currently teaching in universities in Korea. They direct the program with a goal of education for sustainable development.

== International Cultural Exchange Events ==
Pyeonchang Olympics – The One School-One Country (OSOC) (2017–2018)
Junior Ambassador with the Ministry of Culture, Sports and Tourism(MCST), the Korea Arts & Culture Education Service(KACES) and Gangwon Province organized The One School-One Country, OSOC project. In the OSOC project, each school (30 elementary, middle and high schools in total) was assigned to one partner-country amongst the nations participating the 2018 Olympics, to experience the partner country’s arts and culture. This Project aimed to create deeper connections between students and their partner countries through school-embassy pairing and to educate the Junior Ambassadors.

== Makers ambassador Program & Festival (2018) ==
Junior Ambassador with The Ministry of SMEs and Startups of Korea, and Korea Foundation for The advancement of Science & Creativity organized Makers ambassador Program & Festival is the first international exchange program based on maker culture in Korea. As a part of the Junior Ambassador program, it is designed to foster youth makers, promote advanced technology of each country of the world, and empower makers to explore and create innovation for mankind through maker movement. In the Makers Ambassador School & Festival, each school (10 middle or high schools in total) assigned to one partner-country among the nations participating this project, to experience the partner country’s arts, leading technology, and the maker culture. This project aims to spread creativity and inspiration to youth through school-embassy pairing maker-related projects.

== BiFan (The Bucheon International Fantastic Film Festival) ==
Junior Ambassador with The 22nd edition of the BiFan festival to hold Special programs for film fanatics and citizens. Junior Ambassador hold several cultural experience sections related "Best of Asia" sections Movies premier for guests of BIFAN Industry Gathering. The Bucheon International Fantastic Film Festival (BIFAN) has held the Network of Asian Fantastic Films (NAFF) through its industry program (B.I.G.). A chance for filmmakers to show their works for numerous awards (including cash awards for production and post-productions costs), the filmmakers also have the chance to showcase their films to potential producers, investors, and distributors from around the world, bringing their stories one step closer to being shown to audiences in various regions.

== German Language Day 2015 ==
Junior Ambassador co-hosted The "2015 German Day," a cultural festival which was held by European and German-speaking countries such as Germany, Austria, and Switzerland. The event was held on 14 Nov. at the German Cultural Center in Korea. The "German Day" event is held annually to introduce to Korea the languages and diverse cultures of German-speaking countries that are not usually easily accessible and to provide a venue for mutual cultural exchanges. Marking its fifth anniversary in 2015, the German Day event was held under the theme of "The Fairy Tales," featuring performances by Austrian jazz artists and various cultural experiences, including fairy tales told by diplomats.
