= Jennylyn Mercado filmography =

- Film: 33
- Television: 24
- Hosting: 9

The following is a list of performances by Filipina singer-actress Jennylyn Mercado in movie and television industry.

== Filmography ==
=== Film ===
Year	Title	Role
2004	So... Happy Together	Wena
2005	Let the Love Begin	Alex
2005	Say That You Love Me	Kristine
2005	Lovestruck	Denise
2006	Blue Moon	Cora / Corazon
2006	Eternity	Megan
2006	Super Noypi	Lia
2007	Angels	Vivian / Bianang
2007	Tiyanaks	Rina
2007	Resiklo	Bianca
2007	Nars	Ella
2008	Half-Blood Samurai	Kristine
2008	One Night Only	Elvie
2010	Working Girls	Ada Rosales
2010	Rosario	Rosario Pereira
2012	Moron 5 and the Crying Lady	Prison Visitor
2013	The Bride and the Lover	Shiela Montes
2014	English Only, Please	Tere Madlansacay
2015	The Prenup	Wendy Cayabyab
2015	Walang Forever	Mia Nolasco
2016	Just the 3 of Us	CJ Manalo
2017	All of You	Gabby
2019	3pol Trobol: Huli Ka Balbon!	Trina Guillermo
2025	Everything About My Wife	Imogen Karuhatan

=== Drama television series ===
Year	Title	Role
2001-2003	Tabing Ilog	Julia
2002—2003	Kay Tagal Kang Hinintay	Aira
2004	Click	Carol
2004	Click Barkada Hunt	Herself
2004—2005	Joyride	Casey
2004—2005	Forever in My Heart	Joey Almasan
2005	Encantadia	Lira / Milagros
2006	Encantadia: Pag-ibig Hanggang Wakas	Lira / Milagros
2006	Fantastikids	Video Kikay
2006	I Luv NY	Natalie Young
2006	Now and Forever: Dangal	Altamira "Alta" Roxas-Marquez
2007	Super Twins	Super S
2007	Fantastic Man	Super S
2007—2008	La Vendetta	Almira Cardinale
2008	Sine Novela: Kaputol ng Isang Awit	Charmaine Ambrosio
2009	Sine Novela: Paano Ba ang Mangarap?	Elizabeth "Lisa" Estrella-Valderama
2009—2010	Ikaw Sana	Eliza Garcia / Eliza Montemayor-Olivarez
2010	Sine Novela: Gumapang Ka sa Lusak	Rachel Mantaring
2010—2011	Little Star	Helen Estrella
2010	Jillian: Namamasko Po	Cecille
2011	Mars Ravelo's Captain Barbell	Rose
2011	Futbolilits	Lani Melendez
2012	Makapiling Kang Muli	Young Mara Silvestre-Valencia
2012	Hindi Ka Na Mag-iisa	Elisa Santos
2013	Indio	Esperanza Sanreal
2014	Rhodora X	Rhodora Ferrer-Valdez / Roxanne / Baby Rowena
2015	Second Chances	Lyra Bermudez-Padilla
2015	My Faithful Husband	Melanie Fernandez
2017	My Love from the Star	Steffanie Elaine "Steffi" Chavez
2018	The Cure	Charity "Charie" Valdez-Salvador
2019	Love You Two	Rafaella "Raffy" Batungbakal-Reyes
2020	Descendants of the Sun	Dra. Maxine "Doc Beauty" Dela Cruz
2024	Love. Die. Repeat.	Angela Zafra-Yuzon
2025—2026	Sanggang-Dikit FR	PMSgt. Roberta "Bobby" Enriquez
2026	The Master Cutter	Olga Bonifacio

=== Drama anthology shows ===
Year	Title	Role
1998–2003	Maalaala Mo Kaya	Various
2004	Magpakailanman: Ano ang Kulay ng Tunay na Pagmamahal	Herself
2005	Love to Love (Season 9): Miss Match	Joey
2006	Love to Love (Season 12): Jass Got Lucky	Genie Jena
2009	SRO Cinemaserye: Suspetsa	Nina
2009	Dear Friend: Karibal	Cheska
2011	Spooky Nights: Singil	Bless
2013	Magpakailanman: May AIDS ang Asawa Ko	Melissa
2013	Wagas: The Mike and Baby Enriquez Love Story	Baby Enriquez
2013	One Day Isang Araw	Queenie
2013	Wagas: Love me Tomorrow	Lolet Carangga
2015	Magpakailanman: Rehas ng Pag-ibig	Mavic
2016	Pagsubok	Jane
2016	Magpakailanman: Gayuma ng Pag-ibig	Kukay
2018	Dear Uge: Kuha Kita	Sandy
2020	I Can See You: Truly. Madly. Deadly	Coleen De Vera
2021	Daig Kayo Ng Lola Ko	Angel

=== Variety and talk shows ===
Year	Title	Role	Notes
1998	Penpen de Sarapen	Herself / Guest performer	
2001	MTB	Herself / Performer	
2002	ASAP	Herself / Guest performer	
2003–2004	StarStruck l	Herself / Finalist / Winner	
2004–2010	SOP	Herself / Performer	
2004–2006	SOP Gigsters	Herself / Performer	
2010–2013	Party Pilipinas	Herself / Performer	
2011	Protégé: The Battle for the Big Break	Herself / Host	
2011–2012	Showbiz Central	Herself / Host	
2012	Protégé: The Battle for the Big Artista Break	Herself / Host	
2012–2013	HOT TV: Hindi Ordinaryong Tsismis	Herself / Host	
2013–2015	Sunday All Stars	Herself / Performer	
2013	Anak Ko Yan!	Herself / Host	
2015	StarStruck VI	Herself / Judge	
2015–2016	Sarap With Family	Herself / Host	
2016	Superstar Duets	Herself / Host	
2017	Everyday Sarap with CDO	Herself / Host	
2019	StarStruck VII	Herself / Host	
2020; 2024	All-Out Sundays	Herself / Guest performer	
2024–present	It's Showtime	Herself / Guest performer	
