= Dennis Trillo filmography =

- Film: 43
- Television: 34
- Hosting: 5

The following is a list of performances by Filipino-Chinese actor Dennis Trillo in films and television industry.

== Filmography ==
=== Television ===
==== Television series ====
Year	Title	Role	Ref.
1999–2000	Tabing Ilog	Nanding	
2000	Pangako Sa 'Yo	Ruel	
2001–2002	Sa Dulo ng Walang Hanggan	Jojo	
2002–2003	Kahit Kailan	Jaime	
2003–2004	Twin Hearts	Glenn Saraga	
2004–2005	Mulawin	Gabriel	
2005	Mars Ravelo's Darna	Efren / Lalaking Ahas	
2005–2006	Now and Forever: Agos	Danilo Cortez	
2005–2006	Etheria: Ang Ikalimang Kaharian ng Encantadia	Young Raquim	
2006	Majika	Argo	
2006	Now and Forever: Dangal	Adrian Villanueva	
2007	Super Twins	Eliseo Castro / Eliazar Vergara	
2007	Sine Novela: Kung Mahawi Man Ang Ulap	Rustan "Stan" Ilustre	
2007–2008	Zaido: Pulis Pangkalawakan	Gallian Magdalion / Blue Zaido	
2008	E.S.P.	Jared	
2008	Sine Novela: Magdusa Ka	Rodolfo "Rod" Henson	
2008–2009	Carlo J. Caparas' Gagambino	Gambino "Bino" Bayani / Gagambino	
2009	Adik Sa'Yo	Ruben Domingo	
2009–2010	Mars Ravelo's Darna	Pancho Macaspac	
2010	Sine Novela: Gumapang Ka sa Lusak	Levi Ramiro	
2010	Endless Love	Andrew Tantoco	
2010	Jillian: Namamasko Po	Danny Evangelista	
2011	Dwarfina	Lyndon Valencia	
2011	Sinner or Saint	Raul Marcelo	
2012	Legacy	Young Cesar Alcantara	
2012	Biritera	Andrei Marcelino	
2012–2013	Temptation of Wife	Marcelito "Marcel" H. Salcedo	
2013	My Husband's Lover	Enrico "Eric" del Mundo	
2014	Sa Puso ni Dok	Doc. Dennis	
2014–2015	Hiram na Alaala	Ivan Legaspi	
2015	My Faithful Husband	Emman dela Paz	
2016	Juan Happy Love Story	Juan Dela Costa	
2017	Mulawin vs. Ravena	Haring Gabriel Montenegro	
2018	The One That Got Away	William Dominic "Liam" Ilustre	
2018–2019	Cain at Abel	Miguel Anthony Larrazabal / Elias Ledesma	
2020	I Can See You: Truly. Madly. Deadly	Andrew "Drew" Rivera / Warren Devira	
2021	Legal Wives	Ismael Makadatu	
2022–2023	Maria Clara at Ibarra	Crisostomo Ibarra / Simoun / Barry Torres	
2023	Voltes V: Legacy	Baron Hrothgar / Dr. Ned Armstrong	
2023	Love Before Sunrise	Artemio "Atom" Menandrez Jr.	
2024	Pulang Araw	Colonel Yuta Saitoh	
2025–2026	Sanggang-Dikit FR	Police Lt. Antonio "Tonyo" Conde	
TBA	Hari ng Tondo		
TBA	Severino: The First Serial Killer	Juan Severino Mallari	

==== Television shows ====
Year	Title	Role	Ref.
2006–2010	SOP	Co-host/performer	
2009–2010	StarStruck V: The Worldwide Invasion	Host	
2010–2013	Party Pilipinas	Co-host/performer	
2013–2015	Sunday All Stars	Co-host/performer	

==== Drama anthologies ====
Year	Title	Episode	Role	Ref.
2020	Daig Kayo ng Lola Ko	Sa ilalim ng buwan: Part 4	Santi	
2020	Daig Kayo ng Lola Ko	Sa ilalim ng buwan: Part 3	Santi	
2020	Daig Kayo ng Lola Ko	Sa ilalim ng buwan: Part 2	Santi	
2020	Daig Kayo ng Lola Ko	Sa ilalim ng buwan: Part 1	Santi	
2019	Magpakailanman	OFW Most Wanted: Part 2	Rens	
2019	Magpakailanman	OFW Most Wanted: Part 1	Rens	
2019	Magpakailanman	Patawad ama ko	Samuel	
2018	Dear Uge	Who's Your Daddy?	Roy	
2016	Karelasyon	Various episodes	Various roles	
2016	Wagas	Ang Turista at Ang Probinsyana	Rome	
2016	Magpakailanman	Ang Kakambal Kong Ahas	Michael/Lucas	
2015	Magpakailanman	The PO2 Ephraim Mejia Story: Ang Mamatay ng Dahil Sa'yo	Ephraim Mejia	
2014	Magpakailanman	The Eduard Folayang & Mark Sangiao Story: Mga Bagong Mandirigma	Eduard Folayang	
2006	Magpakailanman	The Darius Razon Story	Darius Razon	
2005	Magpakailanman	The Mars Ravelo Story: Buhay na Walang Hanggan	Mars Ravelo	
2005	Magpakailanman	The Joey Faller Story	Fr. Joey Faller	
2004	Magpakailanman	The Diego Llorico Story	Diego's Boyfriend	
2011	Spooky Night Presents	Siyam	—N/a	
2011	Spooky Night Presents	Kalaro	Chris	
2010	Claudine	Bingit na Kaligayahan	Jed	
2010	Love Bug Presents	The Last Romance	Hero	
2009	SRO Cinemaserye	Exchange Gift	Miguel	
2008	Dear Friend	Chinoy	Edison	
2004	Love to Love	Kissing Beauty	Alfred	
2002	Wansapanataym	—N/a	—N/a	
2002	Maalaala Mo Kaya	Treehouse	—N/a	
2001	Maalaala Mo Kaya	Songbook	—N/a	

==== TV specials ====
Year	Title	Role	Notes	Ref.
2004	Angel Villa	St. Rafael	APT Entertainment Lenten special	
2005	Sa Kamay ng Diyos	—N/a	APT Entertainment Lenten special	
2006	Binibining Pilipinas	Presenter	Along with Dingdong Dantes and Pia Guanio	
2006	Sa Ngalan ng Anak	—N/a	APT Entertainment Lenten special	
2007	Unico Hijo	—N/a	APT Entertainment Lenten special with Eddie Garcia	
2009	Sugat ng Kahapon	Sonny	APT Entertainment Lenten special with Marian Rivera	
2011	Maestra	—N/a	APT Entertainment Lenten special with Agot Isidro	
2011–2012	Countdown to 2012: The GMA New Year Special	Performer		
2014	Ilaw ng Kahapon	Dante	Eat Bulaga! Lenten special	

=== Film ===
Year	Title	Role	Notes	Ref.
2004	Mano Po III: My Love	Sigmond Dee	Supporting role	
2004	Aishite Imasu 1941: Mahal Kita	Ignacio Basa/Inya Marasigan	Leading role with Judy Ann Santos	
2005	Mulawin: The Movie	Gabriel	Supporting role	
2006	Blue Moon	Kyle Pineda	Supporting role	
2006	Pamahiin	Noah	Leading role	
2006	TxT	Alex	Leading role with Angel Locsin	
2007	Shake, Rattle and Roll 9	Jerome	Leading role with Roxanne Guinoo	
2008	I.T.A.L.Y.	Paolo Guzman	Leading role with Jolina Magdangal	
2008	Mag-ingat Ka Sa... Kulam	Paul	Leading role with Judy Ann Santos	
2009	Yaya and Angelina: The Spoiled Brat Movie	Yaya's neighbor	Cameo role	
2009	Astig	Ariel	Leading role with Sid Lucero	
2009	Tarot	Miguel	Leading role with Marian Rivera	
2009	Mano Po 6: A Mother's Love	Daniel Chan	Supporting role	
2010	Rosario	Alberto Fernandez	Supporting role	
2011	Temptation Island	Antonio	Supporting role	
2011	My Neighbor's Wife	Aaron Santillan	Leading role with Lovi Poe	
2011	Yesterday, Today, Tomorrow	Derek	Supporting role	
2012	Boy Pick-Up: The Movie	Gabbs/Bagwis	Supporting role	
2012	Ang Katiwala	Ruben	Leading role	
2012	Shake, Rattle and Roll Fourteen: The Invasion	MSgt. Martin Barrientos	Leading role with Paulo Avelino	
2013	Sapi	Dennis	Leading role with Meryll Soriano	
2014	The Janitor	Crisanto Espina	Leading role with Richard Gomez	
2014	Shake, Rattle & Roll XV	Henry	Leading role with Carla Abellana	
2015	You're Still the One	Jojo	Leading role with Maja Salvador	
2015	Felix Manalo	Felix Y. Manalo	Leading role with Bela Padilla	
2016	Lakbay 2 Love	Biker	Leading role with Solenn Heussaff	
2016	Bakit Lahat ng Gwapo may Boyfriend?	Diego	Leading role with Anne Curtis and Paolo Ballesteros	
2018	One Great Love	Ian Arcano	Leading role with Kim Chiu	
2019	Mina-Anud	Ding	Leading role	
2019	Hellcome Home	Peter Villareal	Leading role with Beauty Gonzalez, Raymond Bagatsing and Alyssa Muhlach	
2021	On the Job: The Missing 8	Roman Rubio	Leading role with John Arcilla	
2023	Voltes V: Legacy – The Cinematic Experience	Hrothgar / Ned Armstrong	Special Participation	
2024	Green Bones	Domingo "Dom" Zamora	Leading role with Ruru Madrid	
2025	Everything About My Wife	Dominic "Dom" Brizuela	Leading role with Jennylyn Mercado and Sam Milby	
