= List of awards and nominations received by Jennylyn Mercado =

Jennylyn Mercado awards and nominations
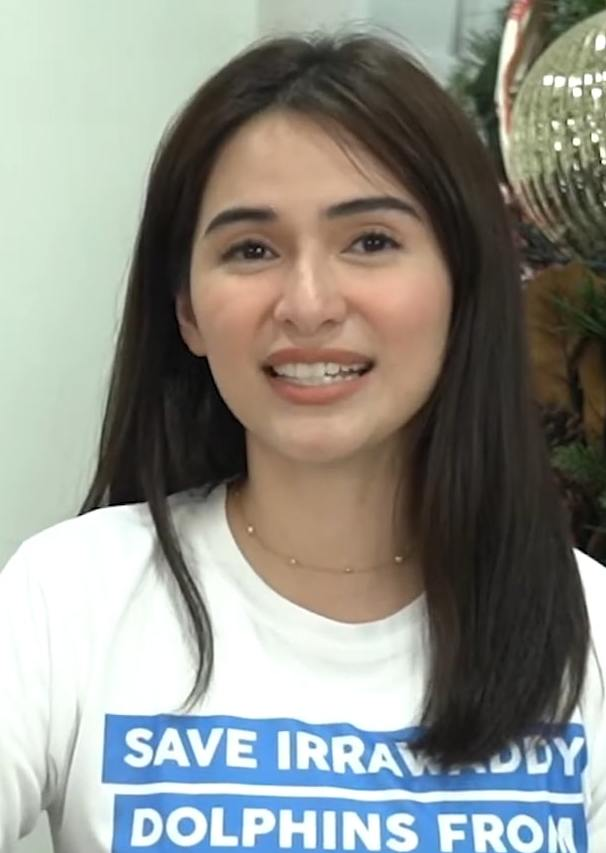
Awards and nominations
Award	Wins	Nominations

Totals (Note: Certain award groups do not simply award one winner. They acknowledge several different recipients, have runners-up, and have third place. Since this is a specific recognition and is different from losing an award, runner-up mentions are considered wins in this award tally. For simplification and to avoid errors, each award in this list has been presumed to have had a prior nomination.)
- Wins: 26
- Nominations: 38

Filipino singer-actress Jennylyn Mercado has received several awards and nominations throughout her acting career in the entertainment industry. She is dubbed as the Ultimate Star and a Rom-com Queen by several media outlet. Her accolades include three Metro Manila Film Festival Best Actress Awards, four Box Office Entertainment Awards, two Edukcircle Awards, one FAMAS Award, one PMPC Star Awards for Television, one Gawad Tanglaw Award and several nominations from Gawad Urian Award , Luna Awards and PMPC Star Awards for Movies.

Mercado made her acting debut as a recurring cast in the 2002 drama series Kay Tagal Kang Hinintay. In 2003, she joined a reality talent competition known as StarStruck and won the top prize as the Ultimate Female Survivor, winning 1 million pesos and an exclusive contract with GMA Network.

She starred in the romantic drama movie, Blue Moon directed by Joel Lamangan in 2005. For playing the shy, young Corazon, she won her first award for People's Choice Best Actress at the 31st Metro Manila Film Festival and Best Supporting Actress in 2005 Gawad Tanglaw Award with nominations from Gawad Urian Award, ENPRESS Golden Screen Awards and Luna Awards.

Mercado top billed the period drama, Rosario a movie based on a true story directed by Alberto Martinez. She played the role of Rosario, a young liberated woman. She was nominated for Best Actress in Gawad Pasado Awards, Luna Award and FAMAS Award.

In 2014, she was cast as the main lead, opposite Derek Ramsay in a romantic comedy movie, English Only, Please directed by Dan Villegas. For playing the role as a young, perky Filipino tutor, Mercado won her first Best Actress Awards in a competitive category at the 40th Metro Manila Film Festival and earned nominations from PMPC Star Awards for Movies and FAMAS Award.

The following year, she returned to romantic comedy with Jericho Rosales in the movie, Walang Forever directed by Dan Villegas. She won her second Best Actress Awards at the 41st Metro Manila Film Festival and won Best Actress award at the Box Office Entertainment Awards with nominations from Gawad Urian and Gawad Pasado. In 2017, she starred with John Lloyd Cruz in another romantic comedy movie, Just the 3 of Us directed by Cathy Garcia-Sampana for which she won a Film Actress Award at EdukCircle Awards.

In television, Mercado received a Best Actress nomination for her performance in drama series Rhodora X at the ENPRESS Golden Screen TV Awards. The next year, she starred with her husband, Dennis Trillo in a drama series My Faithful Husband and won Best Drama Actress at the PMPC Star Awards for Television. In 2019, she was chosen to star opposite Dingdong Dantes in the Philippines adaptation of the Descendants of the Sun which earned her Best Actress nomination at the PMPC Star Awards for Television.

As television host, she won Best Reality Talent Show Host for Starstruck at EdukCircle Awards and received nominations from ENPRESS Golden Screen TV Awards and PMPC Star Awards for Television. In music, Mercado won two Awit Awards with several nominations from PMPC Star Awards for Music.

== Awards and nominations ==
=== Performance awards ===
Organization	Year	Nominated Work	Category	Result	Ref.
Box Office Entertainment Awards	2005	Jennylyn Mercado and Mark Herras	Most Popular Loveteam	Won	
Box Office Entertainment Awards	2006	Jennylyn Mercado and Mark Herras	Most Popular Loveteam	Won	
Box Office Entertainment Awards	2015	The Prenup	Breakthrough Box Office Film (shared with Derek Ramsay)	Won	
Box Office Entertainment Awards	2016	WalangForever	Best Actress	Won	
Edukcircle Awards	2017	Just the 3 of Us	Film Actress of the Year	Won	
Edukcircle Awards	2017	Superstar Duets	Best Female TV Host	Nominated	
Edukcircle Awards	2019	StarStruck	Best Female Reality Show Host	Won	
ENPRESS Golden Screen Awards	2006	Lovestruck	Best Performance by an Actress in a Leading Role in Musical or Comedy	Nominated	
ENPRESS Golden Screen Awards	2006	Blue Moon	Best Performance by an Actress in a Leading Role in Drama	Nominated	
ENPRESS Golden Screen Awards	2013	Showbiz Central	Outstanding Female Program Host in a Talk Show	Nominated	
ENPRESS Golden Screen Awards	2013	Protégé: The Battle for the Big Break	Outstanding Original Reality Competition Program Host	Nominated	
ENPRESS Golden Screen Awards	2015	Rhodora X	Best Performance by an Actress in a Leading Role in Drama	Nominated	
FAMAS Award	2005	Herself	German Moreno Youth Oriented Award	Won	
FAMAS Award	2011	Rosario	Best Actress	Nominated	
FAMAS Award	2015	English Only, Please	Best Actress	Nominated	
Female network	2011	Protégé: The Battle for the Big Break	Best Television Show Host	Won	
Gawad Pasado	2011	Rosario	Pinakapasadong Aktress	Nominated	
Gawad Pasado	2016	WalangForever	Pinakapasadong Aktress	Nominated	
Gawad Tanglaw	2005	Blue Moon	Best Supporting Actress	Won	
Gawad Urian Award	2006	Blue Moon	Best Supporting Actress	Nominated	
Gawad Urian Award	2016	WalangForever	Best Actress	Nominated	
Luna Awards (PAF)	2006	Blue Moon	Best Supporting Actress	Nominated	
Luna Awards (PAF)	2011	Rosario	Best Actress	Nominated	
Metro Manila Film Festival	2006	Blue Moon	People's Choice for Best Actress	Won	
Metro Manila Film Festival	2014	English Only, Please	Best Actress	Won	
Metro Manila Film Festival	2015	WalangForever	Best Actress	Won	
Metro Manila Film Festival	2017	All of You	Best Actress	Nominated	
PEP Awards	2009	Ikaw Sana	Best Drama Actress	Nominated	
PEP Awards	2015	Rhodora X	Teleserye Actress of the Year (Editors choice)	Won	
PEP Awards	2016	Teleserye Actress of the Year	My Faithful Husband	Nominated	
PMPC Star Awards for Movies	2006	Blue Moon	Movie Actress of the Year	Nominated	
PMPC Star Awards for Movies	2015	English only, please	Movie Actress of the Year	Nominated	
PMPC Star Awards for Television	2012	Protégé: The Battle for the Big Break	Best Talent Search Program Host	Nominated	
PMPC Star Awards for Television	2013	Protégé: The Battle for the Big Break	Best Reality Competition Program Host	Nominated	
PMPC Star Awards for Television	2013	H.O.T. TV: Hindi Ordinaryong Tsismis	Best Reality Competition Program Host	Nominated	
PMPC Star Awards for Television	2014	Anak ko Yan	Best Program Host in a Talent Show	Nominated	
PMPC Star Awards for Television	2015	Sarap with Family	Best Educational Program Host	Nominated	
PMPC Star Awards for Television	2016	Sarap with Family	Best Educational Program Host	Nominated	
PMPC Star Awards for Television	2016	My Faithful Husband	Best Drama Actress	Won	
PMPC Star Awards for Television	2017	Sarap Duets	Best Game Show Host	Nominated	
PMPC Star Awards for Television	2017	Everyday Sarap with CDO	Best Educational Program Host	Nominated	
PMPC Star Awards for Television	2019	Descendants of the Sun	Best Drama Actress	Nominated	
VP Choice Awards	2020	Descendants of the Sun: The Philippine Adaptation	TV Actress of the Year	Won	

== Music awards ==
Year	Organization	Category	Result	Ref (s)
2004	Candy Mag Awards	Breakthrough Artist	Won	
2004	SOP Music Awards	Breakthrough Artist	Won	
2005	iFM Pinoy Music Awards	Most Popular Adaptation of a Foreign Song	Won	
2005	Awit Awards	Best Performance by a Duet for the song	Won	
2006	ASAP POP Viewers Choice Awards	Female Pop Artist of the Year	Nominated	
2010	2nd PMPC Star Awards for Music	Female Pop Artist of the Year – Love Is...	Nominated	
2013	5th PMPC Star Awards for Music	Female Pop Artist of the Year – Forever by Your Side	Nominated	
2013	ASAP 18 24K Gold Award – Forever by Your Side	Gold Awardee	Won	
2015	7th PMPC Star Awards for Music	Female Pop Artist of the Year – Never Alone	Nominated	
2015	7th PMPC Star Awards for Music	Pop Album of the Year – Never Alone	Nominated	
2015	7th PMPC Star Awards for Music	Album of the Year – Never Alone	Nominated	
2017	30th Awit Awards	Best Inspirational Recording – "Hagdan"	Nominated	
2017	30th Awit Awards	Best Cover Art – Ultimate	Nominated	
2017	30th Awit Awards	Best Music Video of the Year – "Hagdan"	Won	
2017	30th Awit Awards	Best Christmas Recording – "Hagdan"	Nominated	
2017	30th Awit Awards	Best Performance by a Female Recording Artist – "Hagdan"	Nominated	

=== Box-office awards ===
Year	Organization	Category	Result
2007	Kapuso Box-Office People's Choice Awards	Kapuso Box Office Princess	Won
2007	Kapuso Box-Office People's Choice Awards	Kapuso Movie Box Office Queen	Won
2007	Kapuso Box-Office People's Choice Awards	Kapuso Television Box Office Queen	Won
2007	Kapuso Box-Office People's Choice Awards	Kapuso Box Office Actress	Won
2007	Kapuso Box-Office People's Choice Awards	Kapuso Box Office Sexiest Female	Won

=== Special awards and recognitions ===
Year	Organization	Category	Result
2004	Yes Magazine Reader's Choice Awards	Most Popular Female Young Star	Won
2004	PMPC Star Awards for Television	Female Star of the Night	Won
2004	StarStruck Season 1	Ultimate Female Survivor	Won
2008	Yes Magazine Reader's Choice Awards	Young Female Superstar	Won
2012	Metro Manila Film Festival	Best Dressed Female Celebrity Award	Won
2015	PEP List Choice Awards	Teleserye Actress of the Year	Won
2015	FHM Sexiest Women in the Philippines	Philippines Finest – Rank No. 1	Won
2016	EDUKCIRCLE	Drama Actress of the Year	Nominated
2016	PUSH Awards	Female Celebrity for 2016	Nominated
2016	PEP List Editor's Choice Year 3	Female TV Star of The Year	Nominated

=== Entertainment awards ===
Year	Organization	Category/Result
2004	Yes Magazine Reader's Choice Awards	Most Popular Loveteam with Mark Herras
2006	Franz Entertainment's Top 50 Sexiest Women in the Philippines	Rank #40
2006	Inside Showbiz Magazine Reader's Choice	Most Popular Loveteam with Mark Herras
2006	MOD's Magazine 32 Most Beautiful Filipinas	Rank #12
2007	Starmometer 100 Most Beautiful Pinays	Rank #11
2008	Yes Magazine Reader's Choice Awards	Celebrity Home of the Year
2008	Friendster Most Popular	Rank #6
2009	Yes Magazine 100 Most Beautiful Stars	Mamma Mia
2009	Starmometer.com	Cover Girl of the Year: Rank #6
2011	Yahoo! OMG Awards	Hottest Actress of the Year
2012	PEP Top List	Reality-Show Talents on a Roll: Rank #4
2012	Yes Mag 100 Most Beautiful Stars	Hot Mama
2013	Inside Pinoy Showbiz	Sexiest Hot Mama
2014	Yahoo! OMG Awards	Female Kontrabida of the Year

=== FHM rankings ===
Year	Award	Category	Result	Won by
2004	FHM Philippines	100 Sexiest Woman	Ranked # 9	Cindy Kurleto
2005	FHM Philippines	100 Sexiest Woman	Ranked # 10	Angel Locsin
2006	FHM Philippines	100 Sexiest Woman	Ranked # 6	Katrina Halili
2007	FHM Philippines	100 Sexiest Woman	Ranked # 8	Katrina Halili (2)
2008	FHM Philippines	100 Sexiest Woman	Ranked # 14	Marian Rivera
2009	FHM Philippines	100 Sexiest Woman	Ranked # 17	Cristine Reyes
2010	FHM Philippines	100 Sexiest Woman	Ranked # 10	Angel Locsin (2)
2011	FHM Philippines	100 Sexiest Woman	Ranked # 7	Sam Pinto
2012	FHM Philippines	100 Sexiest Woman	Ranked # 9	Sam Pinto (2)
2013	FHM Philippines	100 Sexiest Woman	Ranked # 4	Marian Rivera (2)
2014	FHM Philippines	100 Sexiest Woman	Ranked # 4	Marian Rivera (3)
2015	FHM Philippines	100 Sexiest Woman	Ranked # 1 PH Finest	Herself
2016	FHM Philippines	100 Sexiest Woman	Ranked # 2	Jessy Mendiola
2017	FHM Philippines	100 Sexiest Woman	Ranked #	Nadine Lustre
