= Jennylyn Mercado discography =

Filipino actress discography

- Studio albums: 5
- EPs: 3
- Compilation albums: 2
- Singles: 11

Filipino-singer and actress Jennylyn Mercado has released 5 studio albums, 2 compilation albums, 3 extended plays and 11 singles.

Prior to her acting career, Mercado started as a singer in a jazz bar to help her family. In 1999, she joined Alpha Records as a recording artist and was a member of the singing group G4. The group was not able to release an album due to the departure of its two members.

In 2004, she released her first album, titled Living the Dream under GMA Records. The album contained 10 tracks with a single Kahit Sandali produced by Vehnee Saturno. The album became a commercial success and earned a platinum award from PARI. After two years, she released her second album, Letting Go containing 10 tracks in which it received a gold record status from PARI.

In 2010, Mercado signed with GMA Records and released her third album, Never Alone. After four years of hiatus, she returned and released her 4th album, titles Ultimate under Ivory Music in 2016, in which the album received gold records award from PARI.

== Discography ==
=== Studio albums ===
Title	Album details	Certifications
Living the Dream	Released: May 24, 2004; Label: GMA Records; Formats: CD, digital downloads	PARI: Platinum (30,000+)
Letting Go	Released: May 8, 2006; Label: GMA Records; Formats: CD, digital downloads	PARI: Gold (15,000+)
Love Is...	Released: March 2010; Label: Viva Records; Formats: CD, digital downloads	
Never Alone	Released: October 4, 2014; Label: GMA Records; Formats: CD, digital downloads	
Ultimate	Released: September 12, 2016; Label: Ivory Music & Video, Inc.; Formats: CD, digital downloads	PARI: Gold (15,000+)

=== Compilation album ===
Title	Album details
Kahit Sandali: The Best of Jennylyn Mercado	Released: March 1, 2008; Label: GMA Records; Formats: CD, digital downloads
GMA Collection Series: Jennylyn Mercado	Released: May 1, 2013; Label: GMA Records; Formats: CD, digital downloads

=== Extended plays ===
Title	Album details	Certifications
Forever By Your Side	Released: July 23, 2012; Label: PolyEast Records; Formats: CD, digital downloads	PARI: Gold (15,000+)
Jennylyn Mercado – Ultimate	Released: September 12, 2016; Label: Ivory Music & Video; Formats: CD, digital downloads	PARI: Gold (15,000+)
JEN	Released: May 23, 2025; Label: Star Music; Formats: CD, digital downloads	

=== Singles ===
Year	Title	Album
2004	"Kahit Sandali"	Living The Dream
2005	"Sa Aking Panaginip"	Letting Go
2005	"It's Christmas All Over The World"	Kapuso sa Pasko
2006	"Moments of Love" (with Janno Gibbs)	Moments of Love OST
2008	"Kaya Mo Bang Ibalik"	Kahit Sandali
2010	"Sometimes Love Just Ain't Enough"	Love is...
2012	"Hindi Ka Na Mag-iisa"	Forever By Your Side
2014	"Basta't Nandito Ka"	Never Alone
2016	"Hagdan"	Ultimate
2025	"Ayaw Pa rin Umuwi"	JEN
2025	"Hindi Pa Rin Sapat"	JEN

== Concerts ==
Year	Title	Venue	Notes	Ref.
2009	I am Woman	Music Museum; Greenhills San Juan, Metro Manila	Special guests include Christian Bautista, Janno Gibbs, Richard Poon, Ogie Alcasid, Jay R, Nico Antonio and Jasmine Fitzgerald	
2018	Sikat Ka Kapuso	April 7, 2018; Newark Symphony Hall, New Jersey; United States	Dingdong Dantes, Dennis Trillo, Jennylyn Mercado, Lovi Poe, Alden Richards, Betong Sumaya	
2018	Sikat Ka Kapuso	April 8, 2018; Sony Center Performing Arts, Toronto; Canada	Dingdong Dantes, Dennis Trillo, Jennylyn Mercado, Lovi Poe, Alden Richards, Betong Sumaya	
2020	Co-Love Live with Dennis Trillo	New Frontier Theater; Cubao, Quezon City	Special guests include Alden Richards, Nico Antonio, Juan Miguel Severo, Jay Durias, Nyoy Volante, Carlo Aquino, JK Labajo, and Alex Gonzaga.	
