= Ar Angel Aviles =

Filipino actress

- Born: Ar Angel Aviles; October 13, 2003 (age 22); Philippines
- Occupations: Child actress, student
- Years active: 2013–2018
- Agent: GMA Artist Center (2013–2018)

Ar Angel Aviles (born October 13, 2003) is a Filipino actress, known for Magpakailanman and Destiny Rose. The first Philippine TV series that she first appeared in GMA was Rhodora X which stars Jennylyn Mercado, Mark Herras, Yasmien Kurdi, and Mark Anthony Fernandez. She also performed in Rhodora X.

== Filmography ==
Television series

Year	Title	Role
2017	Magpakailanman: Drug Mule sa China	Joy
2017	Pinulot Ka Lang sa Lupa	young Santina
2016	Magpakailanman: Anak sa Mundo ng Druga	Joy
2016	Once Again	Clara del Mundo
2016	Hanggang Makita Kang Muli	young Odessa
2016	Magpakailanman: Multo ni Ella	Kakai
2015	Magpakailanman: Binihag na kasambahay	young Nida
2015	Destiny Rose	young April
2015	Let the Love Begin	Elsa
2015	Magpakailanman: Love After the Storm	Jovelyn
2015	Imbestigador	Aya
2014	Magpakailanman: Girl boy bakla tomboy	young Mary Rose
2014	Magpakailanman: Dalawang kasarian	young Jonalyn
2014	Rhodora X	young Rhodora
2013	Magpakailanman: Sa Hirap at Ginhawa	young Charlie
