= List of My Faithful Husband episodes =

My Faithful Husband is a 2015 Philippine television drama romance series broadcast by GMA Network. It premiered on the network's Telebabad line up and worldwide on GMA Pinoy TV from August 10, 2015 to November 13, 2015 replacing The Rich Man's Daughter.

Mega Manila ratings are provided by AGB Nielsen Philippines.

== Series overview ==
Month	Episodes	Monthly Averages
Month	Episodes	Mega Manila
August 2015	16	16.9%
September 2015	22	18.5%
October 2015	22	17.7%
November 2015	10	17.9%
Total	70	17.8%

== Episodes ==
=== August 2015 ===
Episode		Original air date	Summary	Social Media Hashtag	AGB Nielsen Mega Manila Households in Television Homes			Ref.
Episode		Original air date	Summary	Social Media Hashtag	Rating	Timeslot Rank	Primetime Rank	Ref.
1	Pilot	August 10, 2015	Emman meeting Mel is serendipitous. Though, feeling that his birthday is unimportant, Mel makes a way for Emman's birthday to become a memorable one.	#MyFaithfulHusband	17.6%	#2	#5	
2	Answered Prayer	August 11, 2015	Mel and Emman go on a date and get to know each other. Though Emman is open about his past, Mel is protective of her past with Dean.	#MFHAnsweredPrayer	17.4%	#2	#7	
3	Emman Loves Mel	August 12, 2015	Emman comforts a broken-hearted Mel; Carmen learns that Mel is pregnant and Emman admits to being the father.	#MFHEmmanLovesMel	17.0%	#2	#7	
4	Emmanie Wedding	August 13, 2015	Emman and Mel marry. But tensions are still high as Mercedes is not convinced that Emman is the father of Mel's baby.	#MFHEmmanieWedding	16.5%	#2	#8	
5	Unexpected Return	August 14, 2015	Mel gets hired as a nurse without the knowledge that Dean is one of the managers in the company.	#MFHUnexpectedReturn	18.8%	#1	#5	
6	Family Matters	August 17, 2015	Upon learning that Dean is also part of the company, Mel withholds her application giving Mercedes another reason to hate her.	#MFHFamilyMatters	16.5%	#2	#7	
7	Compromises	August 18, 2015	Mel borrows money from Carmen and Rosanna but gets mugged; in an act of desperation, Mel accepts the job offer from the company where Dean works as a manager.	#MFHCompromises	16.0%	#2	#7	
8	White Lies	August 19, 2015	Dean tries to flirt with Mel at work but gets rejected every time. Mel tries to tell Emman that she is working with her ex-boyfriend as advised by Mylene but didn't get the chance.	#MFHWhiteLies	16.8%	#2	#7	
9	Surprise Visit	August 20, 2015	Emman meets Dean at Mel's workplace which prompts him to ask Mel about him but she is uncomfortable discussing about it; Dean tries to give a gift to Mel's daughter and kisses her.	#MFHSurpriseVisit	16.6%	#2	#8	
10	Suspicions	August 21, 2015	Mel files a restraining order against Dean. The CEO wants to fire Mel, but Dean refuses and admits that she is his ex.	#MFHSuspicions	16.8%	#2	#7	
11	Regrets	August 24, 2015	Dean breaks his arm from falling down the stairs. Mel visits him to have him sign the waivers. While Emman is considering working overseas.	#MFHRegrets	15.7%	#2	#8	
12	Clueless Emman	August 25, 2015	Mel calls out Dean's name while making out with Emman making him ask if she still has feelings for her ex; Mel receives a bouquet of tulips from Dean and asks him to stay away or she will file charges against him.	#MFHCluelessEmman	16.3%	#2	#8	
13	Mel's Decision	August 26, 2015	Mel resigns from her work. While Emman is trying to help Carla cope with her pregnancy. Mylene accidentally spills to Carmen that Mel has a child Dean.	#MFHMelsDecision	16.9%	#2	#7	
14	Fateful Night	August 27, 2015	Mel admits to Emman that she quit her job and that she is borrowing money from Carmen; Emman accepts the overseas job; Adelle calls Mel to hang out without knowing that it is Dean's plan; everyone gets drunk and Dean takes Mel to his condo.	#MFHFatefulNight	17.0%	#2	#7	
15	Mel vs. Mercedes	August 28, 2015	Mercedes warns Mel about Emman going overseas for work; Mel losses her temper and starts talking back; Dean takes Mel to a restaurant and offers to listen about her problems.	#MFHMelVsMercedes	18.1%	#1	#6	
16	Marital Problems	August 31, 2015	Mel apologizes to Carmen for talking back and Emman apologizes to Mel if she feels that he is taking his mother's side; Dean admits to Mel that he is still in love with her; he gives her a goodbye kiss just before Emman arrives.	#MFHMaritalProblems	15.7%	#2	#8	

=== September 2015 ===
Episode		Original air date	Summary	Social Media Hashtag	AGB Nielsen Mega Manila Households in Television Homes			Ref.
Episode		Original air date	Summary	Social Media Hashtag	Rating	Timeslot Rank	Primetime Rank	Ref.
17	Forbidden Kiss	September 1, 2015	Mel catches Emman kissing a girl from a pub; she turns to Dean to talk about her problems and they kissed; Dean tries to convince Mel that they still have a connection.	#MFHForbiddenKiss	17.2%	#2	#6	
18	Secret Affair	September 2, 2015	Mel tells Dean that she can only offer friendship. They talked all night on the phone, keeping their friendship a secret from Mel's family. Mel receives an order for flowers.	#MFHSecretAffair	17.9%	#2	#7	
19	Torn and Confused	September 3, 2015	Dean tries to call Mel but Emman answers the phone. Dean pretends that he's calling to give Mel her job back. Mel admits to Adelle that she is still in love with Dean.	#MFHTornAndConfused	17.0%	#2	#7	
20	Hinala ni Emman	September 4, 2015	Dean tries to call Mel but Emman answers the phone. Dean pretends that he's calling to give Mel her job back. Mel admits to Adelle that she is still in love with D.	#MFHHinalaNiEmman	17.4%	#2	#7	
21	Aksidente	September 7, 2015	Dean tries to blackmail Mel and they argued inside Dean's car causing it to hit a truck; Emman receives a call from the hospital about Mel's accident and learns that she is with a guy during the accident.	#MFHAksidente	18.3%	#2	#7	
22	Galit ni Emman	September 8, 2015	Emman learns that Mel was with Dean during the accident. He overhears from the hospital staff that Mel and Dean was from a motel prior to the accident. Emman forces a confrontation with Dean.	#MFHGalitNiEmman	18.1%	#1	#5	
23	Bagsik ni Emman	September 9, 2015	Emman forces a confrontation with Dean but Arnaldo restrains him; Emman tells Mel that he knows the truth; Mel begs Emman for forgiveness but in vain; Dean tells Arnaldo that he will not tell Emman the truth.	#MFHBagsikNiEmman	19.4%	#1	#5	
24	Durog na Puso ni Emman	September 10, 2015	Emman forces a confrontation with Dean but Arnaldo restrains him; Emman tells Mel that he knows the truth; Mel begs Emman for forgiveness but in vain; Dean tells Arnaldo that he will not tell Emman the truth.	#MFHDurogNaPusoNiEmman	20.7%	#1	#5	
25	Banta ni Mercedes	September 11, 2015	Mel promises that she will be a good wife to Emman. He tells her to just do it. Emman cancels his plans of going overseas, angering Mercedes. She confronts Mel and forces a confession out of him.	#MFHBantaNiMercedes	19.5%	#2	#7	
26	Emman vs. Dean	September 14, 2015	Emman visits Dean in his office to assault him; Arnaldo wants to file a case against Emman but is surprised when he learns of Emman's real name; Mel finds Dean outside their house.	#MFHEmmanVsDean	18.3%	#1	#7	
27	Buwelta ni Mercedes	September 15, 2015	Arnaldo tells Dean to stay away from Emman; Emman confronts Mel about Dean's visit; Mercedes publicly shames Mel for her infindelity.	#MFHBuweltaNiMercedes	18.7%	#1	#6	
28	Battle of the Balaes	September 16, 2015	Arnaldo tells Dean to stay away from Emman; Emman confronts Mel about Dean's visit; Mercedes publicly shames Mel for her infindelity.	#MFHBattleOfTheBalaes	19.4%	#1	#4	
29	Desisyon ni Emman	September 17, 2015	Emman went to see Lorenz and was pleasantly surprised when he was given an inheritance that Arnaldo had left for him. There was land and some money Arnaldo had saved as well. Dante and Carla went to the funeral parlor to ask Emman to go with them to see Cedes in jail but Emman refused to go, saying that he was not yet ready to face his mother.	#MFHDesisyonNiEmman	18.3%	#2	#7	
30	Panlalamig ni Emman	September 18, 2015	Dennis, still cold with Mel, gets drunk and tells his story to a girl in a bar; she tells him that Mel probably still has feelings for Dean; Emman asks Mel if she still has feelings for Dean.	#MFHPanlalamigNiEmman	18.5%	#2	#7	
31	Pananadya ni Mercedes	September 21, 2015	Mel tells Dean that she is trying to fix her family, hangs up the phone, and destroys the sim card; Lorenz tells Emman that Mel is prioritizing him and their family; Mercedes wants Mel to admit the children are not Emman's.	#MFHPananadyaNiMercedes	18.2%	#2	#6	
32	Pagbubunyag	September 22, 2015	Mercedes forces a confession from Mel but accidentally pushes Carla down the stairs; Dean tells Emman the truth; Carmen sneaks into Mercedes' house to get the children but is caught.	#MFHPagbubunyag	16.1%	#2	#7	
33	Hiwalayan	September 23, 2015	Carmen fails to get the children. Dean is not convinced that he is Mel's rebound. He steps in when things don't work out between Emman and Mel.	#MFHHiwalayan	19.3%	#2	#7	
34	Pangako ni Emman	September 24, 2015	Carmen does not want Mel to go back with Emman; Dean sees Emman and Mel fighting outside the pastry shop and tries to break it; Mercedes wants a DNA test for Emman and his children.	#MFHPangakoNiEmman	20.4%	#1	#5	
35	Ang Katotohanan	September 25, 2015	Dean insists on getting back with Mel but she declines. Mercedes learns Munding's identity from Lorenz. Mylene advises Mel to stay away from Dean.	#MFHAngKatotohanan	19.3%	#1	#6	
36	Alsa Balutan	September 28, 2015	Mercedes goes home drunk and tells Munding that she is not her real granddaughter; Emman gets his children and moves out of the house; Mylene asks Mel where she went with Dean but Emman overhears it.	#MFHAlsaBalutan	18.1%	#2	#7	
37	Insecurities	September 29, 2015	Emman confronts Mel after she and Dean were at the same event; he finds Mel's scrapbook about Dean and asks what is with Dean that she can never forget; Dean expresses that he is not interested in anyone but Mel.	#MFHInsecurities	18.7%	#1	#6	
38	Tunay na Ama	September 30, 2015	Mel hugged a girl that she thought was Munding. The girl's mother approached them and snatched the girl away from Mel's embrace, accusing her of being a kidnapper. When Emman went to Mel, Mel became hysterical and accused him of calling her crazy because she had hugged that little girl.	#MFHTunayNaAma	17.7%	#2	#7	

=== October 2015 ===
Episode		Original air date	Summary	Social Media Hashtag	AGB Nielsen Mega Manila Households in Television Homes			Ref.
Episode		Original air date	Summary	Social Media Hashtag	Rating	Timeslot Rank	Primetime Rank	Ref.
39	Sisihan	October 1, 2015	Munding tries to run away from Mel and Emman but Mel tries to make her understand their family's situation; Dean overhears what Munding said but Mel denies it; Munding goes to Emman when Dean tries to get her; Emman and Dean get into a fistfight.	#MFHSisihan	16.4%	#2	#8	
40	Pakiusap	October 2, 2015	Dean wants to spend more time with Munding but the deal is for just one meeting; Carmen catches Dean stalking outside Munding's school; Mercedes wants to make a deal with Dean, she will give him Munding in exchange for money.	#MFHPakiusap	15.9%	#2	#8	
41	Karapatan	October 5, 2015	Emman get jealous on Dean for giving Munding's wants and needs. At the school, Mercedes plans to keep Munding away from Dean.	#MFHKarapatan	18.0%	#2	#7	
42	Kasunduan	October 6, 2015	Mercedes takes Ali to the mall and calls Dean for the exchange; she goes home and tells Emman and Mel that she lost Ali; Emman and Mel go to Dean's house and Dean pretends that he does not know that Ali's missing.	#MFHKasunduan	18.6%	#2	#7	
43	Pagdududa	October 7, 2015	Charito helps Dean hide Ali in their house; Mel goes back home to confront Mercedes about the real story; Arnaldo brings back Ali to Emman and Mel but is recognized by Mercedes; Mercedes calls him a rapist.	#MFHPagdududa	18.7%	#2	#5	
44	Harapan	October 8, 2015	Emman learns that Arnaldo is his father; Dean admits to Mel that Mercedes is the one who gave him Ali; Emman learns of Mercedes' involvement with Ali's disappearance; Mel goes home to confront Mercedes.	#MFHHarapan	18.9%	#2	#7	
45	Awa	October 9, 2015	Mercedes remembers what happened and ends up hurting Dante; Mel tells Mylene the reason why Emman is angry with Arnaldo; Lorenz asks Emman to give Arnaldo a chance to fix their relationship.	#MFHAwa	18.2%	#2	#7	
46	Kapatawaran	October 12, 2015	Arnaldo pleads Emman to give him a chance but gives a condition that he will do so if Arnaldo makes the same effort with Mercedes. Mercedes drinks on the street.	#MFHKapatawaran	18.7%	#1	#6	
47	Kasawian	October 13, 2015	Mercedes admits to Carla what she did to Arnaldo, while Arnaldo wants Emman to protect Mercedes. Meanwhile, mars tells everyone about Mercedes being near the scene of the crime, while Mercedes asks Emman for money so she and Carla can escape.	#MFHKasawian	19.7%	#1	#6	
48	Takas	October 14, 2015	Emman tries to convince Mercedes to give herself up. Lorenz asks Emman if he knows where Mercedes is. The police catches Mercedes and pleads Emman to get her and Carla out of jail.	#MFHTakas	18.5%	#1	#6	
49	Hiling	October 15, 2015	Lorenz confronts Mercedes about what she did to Arnaldo; Dean tells Emman and Mel that they will drop the charges in exchange for Ali; Mel does not want the deal but Emman calls Dean.	#MFHHiling	17.0%	#2	#7	
50	Sakripisyo	October 16, 2015	Emman declines Dean's offer; Carmen advises Mel that the children should stay with her just to be safe; Emman admits to the police that he killed Arnaldo and surrenders so Mercedes will be set free.	#MFHSakripisyo	19.0%	#2	#6	
51	Pangarap	October 19, 2015	Emman and Mel worry about Aliyah's condition; Dean promises Aliyah that he will take care of her; Emman and Mel have a difficult time coping with the condition.	#MFHPangarap	15.8%	#2	#9	
52	Proud Dad	October 20, 2015	Emman decides to study Horticulture and Mel decides to practice Nursing; Aliyah invites her dad to a 'Show Your Dad' Program at school; Dean also shows up; Mel worries about Aliyah's nose bleed.	#MFHProudDad	17.1%	#2	#7	
53	Karamdaman	October 21, 2015	Mel and Emman were worried because the doctor found an abnormality in Munding's blood and suspected that she was ill. In the doctor's room, they already found out Munding's real illness.	#MFHProudDad	16.3%	#2	#8	
54	Holding On	October 22, 2015	Mel explains the illness to Aliyah. Dean is angry at Mel for hiding their daughter's condition. Aliyah is losing her hair due to the treatment but Emman assures her that she is still be beautiful.	#MFHHoldingOn	16.4%	#2	#8	
55	Sacrifice	October 23, 2015	The doctor tells Mel the cost of the bone marrow transplant for Aliyah; Dean offers to shoulder the cost but Mel refuses; upon testing, Dean is the only bone marrow match for Aliyah but on one condition, he wants sole custody of the child.	#MFHSacrifice	17.5%	#2	#8	
56	Compromise	October 26, 2015	Dean and Mel argue about Aliyah's custody; Mel allows Dean to visit the child; Emman feels distant when he sees Dean and Mel taking care of Aliyah; Mylene tells Emman that he should be the one inside taking care of Aliyah.	#MFHCompromise	17.8%	#2	#7	
57	Sisters	October 27, 2015	Dean and Mel argue about Aliyah's custody; Mel allows Dean to visit the child; Emman feels distant when he sees Dean and Mel taking care of Aliyah; Mylene tells Emman that he should be the one inside taking care of Aliyah.	#MFHSisters	17.3%	#2	#7	
58	Pag-amin	October 28, 2015	Mylene walks out of their house when Artemio is having dinner with the family. Emman fetches Mylene and takes her home. Mylene kisses Emman but Artemio sees it.	#MFHPagAmin	17.0%	#2	#6	
59	Confession	October 29, 2015	Mylene apologizes to Emman about kissing him and admits that she has feelings for him; Emman advises her to forget her feelings for him; Mylene also admits to Mel that she is falling for Emman	#MFHConfession	17.7%	#1	#6	
60	Pangamba	October 30, 2015	Mel admits to Carmen that she is disappointed with Mylene and that she now understands what Emman felt when she cheated on him; Aliyah celebrates her birthday with Dean and Mel.	#MFHPangamba	18.3%	#1	#6	

=== November 2015 ===
Episode		Original air date	Summary	Social Media Hashtag	AGB Nielsen Mega Manila Households in Television Homes			Ref.
Episode		Original air date	Summary	Social Media Hashtag	Rating	Timeslot Rank	Primetime Rank	Ref.
61	Tiwala	November 2, 2015	Emman is drinking with Dodong and Mars, gets drunk and goes to Dean's place, shouting Mel's name. Mel gets worried upon seeing blood from Aliyah's mouth.	#MFHTiwala	16.4%	#2	#5	
62	Treatment	November 3, 2015	Dean tells Emman and Mel that he has a relative in the US that can help with Aliyah's condition; Emman confronts Mel and Dean for not telling him about Aliyah's trial treatment; Emman decides that Aliyah will not leave for US.	#MFHTreatment	17.5%	#2	#7	
63	Aliyah	November 4, 2015	Mel tells Emman the she has decided to take Aliyah to the US; Aliyah bleeds from her nose again; she asks Mel why she is not getting any better despite all the prayers.	#MFHAliyah	16.8%	#2	#7	
64	Fatal	November 5, 2015	Aliyah has a going-away party with her classmates and introduces Dean as her dad; on their way to the airport, Aliyah gets dizzy and pukes; the doctor tells them to prepare for whatever might happen.	#MFHFatal	17.5%	#1	#6	
65	Paglisan	November 6, 2015	Mel is not in favor of bringing Luningning to the hospital and she is mad at Emman for assuming that Aliyah is dying; the doctor tells the family that Aliyah is in coma; Mel notices Aliyah's movement.	#MFHPaglisan	17.0%	#2	#7	
66	Pamamaalam	November 9, 2015	Everyone is emotional over Aliyah's death; Emman asks the doctor if it is his fault but the doctor tells him that he is not to blame; Dean cannot accept the fact that his daughter's gone.	#MFHPamamaalam	18.7%	#1	#6	
67	Moving On	November 10, 2015	Dean confronts Mel that they should have insisted on bringing Aliyah to the US. Mel tells Emman that he is to be blamed for Aliyah's death. She cries while talking to Aliyah's grave.	#MFHMovingOn	18.6%	#1	#6	
68	Paninisi	November 11, 2015	Dean visits Aliyah's grave and sees Mel sleeping beside it; Mel questions Emman's ability to cope with Aliyah's death; Emman bursts in anger and admits that Aliyah's death is his fault.	#MFHPaninisi	18.5%	#1	#5	
69	Bagong Simula	November 12, 2015	Emman gives a bouquet of flowers to Mel but she tells Emman that she wants them to separate. Carmen tells Emman to fight for their family but he will do it for himself.	#MFHBagongSimula	18.5%	#1	#6	
70	Finale	November 13, 2015	Mel tells Emman about the job offer as a head nurse in Canada. She is bringing Luningning along to which Emman agrees. Mel feels that Emman doesn't need her anymore.	#MFHFinale	19.9%	#1	#5	
