= The Bride and the Lover =

- Theatrical poster
- Directed by: Joel C. Lamangan
- Written by: Rody Vera
- Produced by: Lily Y. Monteverde; Roselle Y. Monteverde
- Starring: Lovi Poe; Jennylyn Mercado; Paulo Avelino
- Cinematography: Mo Zee
- Edited by: Vanessa Ubas de Leon
- Music by: Emerzon Texon
- Production company: Regal Films
- Distributed by: GMA Films
- Release date: May 1, 2013
- Running time: 95 minutes
- Country: Philippines
- Languages: Filipino; English
- Box office: ₱10,396,904.00

The Bride and the Lover is a 2013 Filipino romantic film directed by Joel Lamangan, starring Lovi Poe, Jennylyn Mercado and Paulo Avelino.

== Synopsis ==
In the story, Vivian (Lovi Poe) is sole heir to a business empire. Sheila is Vivian's friend who is a lifestyle magazine editor. Meanwhile, Philip is the hottest bachelor in town engaged to be wed to Vivian. However, a scandalous revelation tears the three characters' worlds apart. Time passes by and the supposed bride becomes the lover and the supposed lover is now the bride. What's more, the former bride becomes a fearfully revengeful lover who is relentless in her quest to get her ex-fiancé back.

== Cast ==
Main cast

- Lovi Poe as Vivian Paredes
- Jennylyn Mercado as Shiela Montes
- Paulo Avelino as Philip Albino

Supporting cast

- Alex Castro as Matteo
- Hayden Kho as Bruno
- Tim Yap as Ricardo
- Joem Bascon as Mike
- Kat Alano as Gia
- Cai Cortez as Pinky
- Carlo Gonzales as Greg
- Alora Sasam as Poch
- Ariel Ureta as Nestor Paredes
- Timmy Cruz as Baby Montes
- Carmi Martin as Josephine Paredes
- Buboy Garovillo as Alfonso Albino
- Snooky Serna as Gloria Albino
