= Living the Dream (Jennylyn Mercado album) =

Studio album by Jennylyn Mercado
- Released: 2004
- Genre: Pop
- Label: GMA Records
- Producer: Buddy C. Medina (executive), Kedy Sanchez (A&R supervising), Jimmy Antiporda, Alwyn Cruz, Janno Gibbs, Vehnee Saturno, Melvin Morallos

Jennylyn Mercado chronology
'''Living the Dream''' (2004)	Letting Go (2006)

Living the Dream is the first solo album by the StarStruck winner Jennylyn Mercado, released in 2004.

== Background ==
After winning StarStruck, Mercado was signed by GMA Records as their second artist after Jolina Magdangal.

== Music ==
The album contains ten tracks, with its lead single being "Kahit Sandali", written by Vehnee Saturno, which became a radio hit. It also featured "If I'm Not In Love With You", a duet with Janno Gibbs, and "Sapat Na Ang Minsan", which also became a hit.

== Commercial performance ==
Living the Dream sold more than 30,000 copies, and was certified gold.

== Track listing ==
No.	Title	Writer(s)	Arranger(s)	Length
1.	"Kaibigang Tunay"	Words by Cymbee Antiporda, Music by Jimmy Antiporda	Jimmy Antiporda	4:33
2.	"Tamang In Love"	Boy Christopher	Melvin Morallos	3:39
3.	"Living The Dream"	Rebel Magdagasang	Vic Oria	4:51
4.	"Astig Ang Boyfriend Ko"	Gary Granada	Nino Regalado	3:29
5.	"If I'm Not In Love With You" (featuring Janno Gibbs)	Ann Dawn Thomas	Marvin Querido	3:44
6.	"Pump It Up"	Jimmy Antiporda	Jimmy Antiporda	2:57
7.	"Kahit Sandali"	Vehnee Saturno	Marvin Querido	4:45
8.	"Sapat Na Ang Minsan"	Agatha Obar	Melvin Morallos	4:38
9.	"The Power Of The Dream"	Kenneth B. Edmonds, David Foster, Linda Thompson	Ric Mercado	3:34
10.	"Starstruck (Final Judgment)"	Marc Lopez, additional words & music by Kedy Sanchez	Ric Mercado	3:08

== Personnel ==
- Buddy C. Medina - executive producer
- Rene Salta - in charge of marketing
- Kedy Sanchez - A&R supervising producer
- GMA Artist Center - artist management
- Jimmy Antiporda
- Aji Manalo
- Arnold Jallores
- Boggie Manipon
- Dominique Benedicto
- Alexi Corbilla
- Ramil Bahandi
- Marlon Silva
- Dong Tan - cover concept, cover design & execution
- Claude Rodrigo - cover design & execution
- Jake Versoza - photography
- Mariel Chua - hair & make-up
- Ana Kalw - wardrobe

== Release history ==
Release history for Living the Dream
Region	Date	Label	Ref.
Philippines	2004	GMA Records	

== See also ==
- GMA Records
- GMA Network
