= Little Star (TV series) =

Philippine television drama series

- Title card
- Genre: Drama; Musical
- Directed by: Maryo J. de los Reyes
- Creative director: Jun Lana
- Starring: Jennylyn Mercado; Mark Anthony Fernandez; Paolo Contis; Lovi Poe; Nicky Castro
- Theme music composer: Tito Sotto
- Opening theme: "Little Star" by Ciara Sotto
- Country of origin: Philippines
- Original language: Tagalog
- No. of episodes: 80

Production
- Executive producer: Mona Coles-Mayuga
- Camera setup: Multiple-camera setup
- Running time: 23–24 minutes
- Production company: GMA Entertainment Group

Original release
- Network: GMA Network
- Release: October 25, 2010 – February 11, 2011

Little Star is a Philippine television drama musical series broadcast by GMA Network. Directed by Maryo J. de los Reyes, it stars Nicki Castro in the title role, Jennylyn Mercado, Mark Anthony Fernandez, Lovi Poe and Paolo Contis. It premiered on October 25, 2010 on the network's Haponalo line up. The series concluded on February 11, 2011, with a total of 80 episodes.

The series is streaming online on YouTube.

== Cast and characters ==
Cast

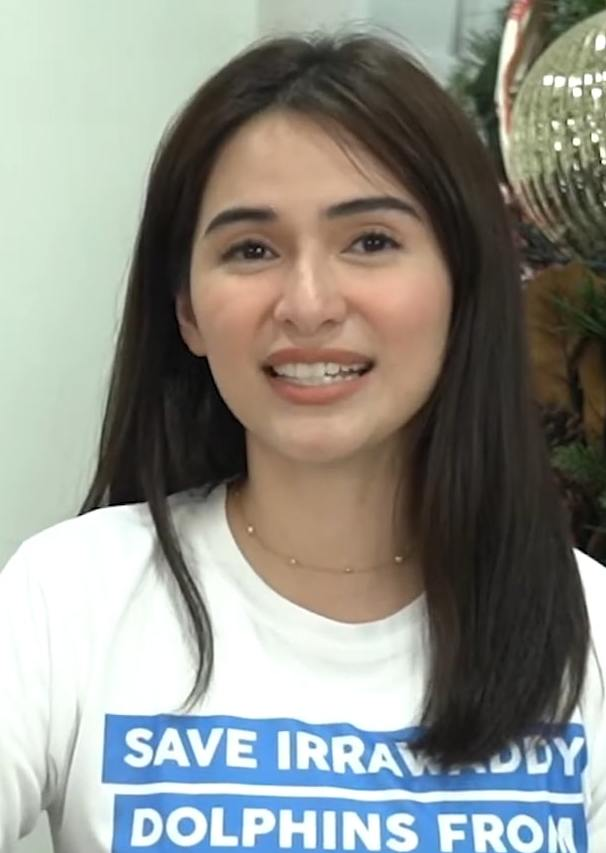
Jennylyn Mercado

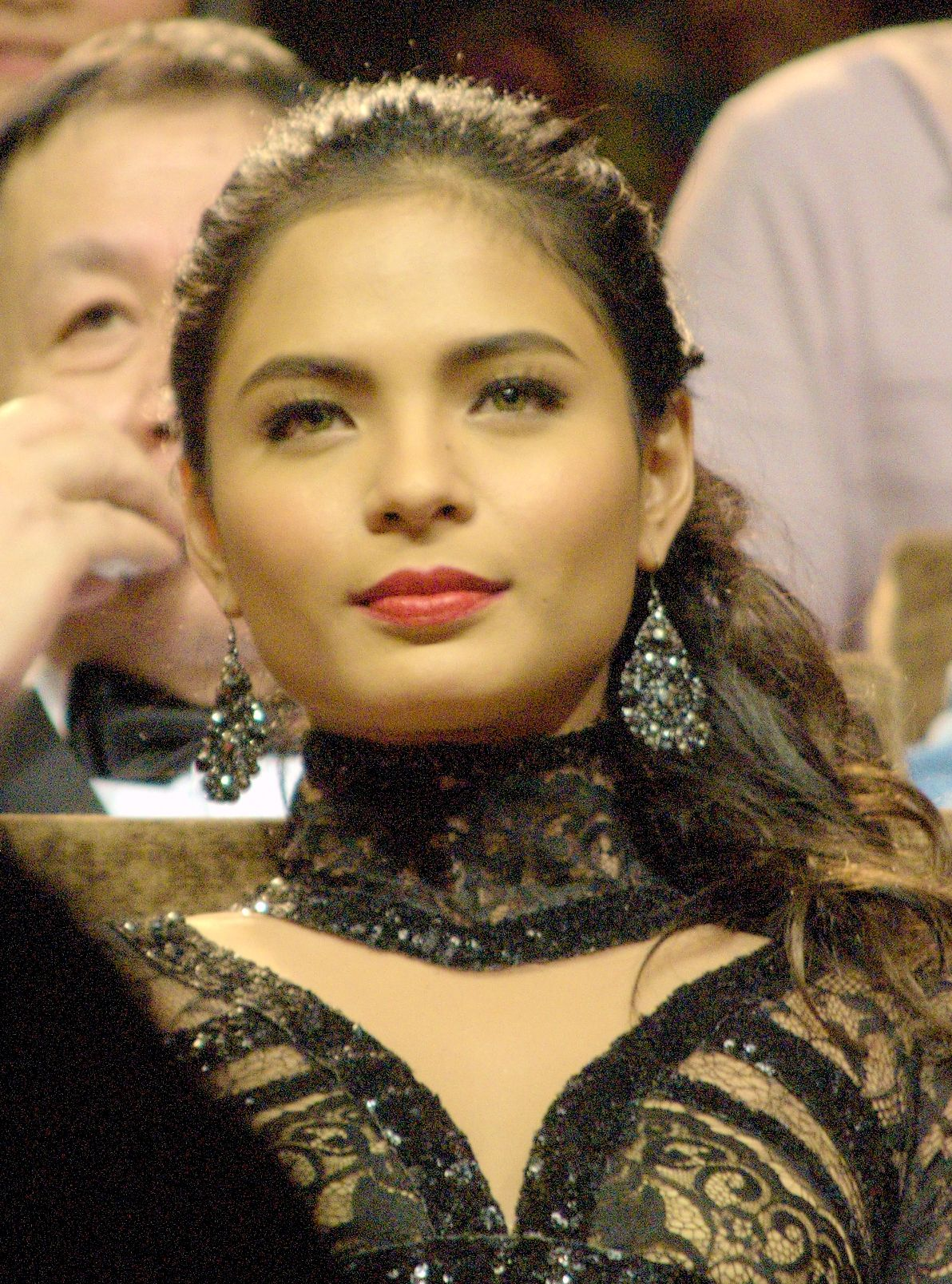
Lovi Poe

Lead cast

- Jennylyn Mercado as Helen Estrella
- Mark Anthony Fernandez as Dave de Leon
- Lovi Poe as Gwyneth Cordova
- Paolo Contis as Lester Lumibao
- Nicky Castro as Niño Estrella

Supporting cast

- Sarah Lahbati as Paula Estrella
- Divina Valencia as Divina de Leon
- Nina Kodaka as Aurora Wang
- Jiro Manio as Joross
- Allan Paule as Gener Estrella
- Maricel Morales as Ruby
- Chinggay Riego as Angge
- Rich Asuncion as Bianca Valerio
- Shamaine Buencamino as Cecilla "Cecile" Cordova
- Orlando Sol as Borge
- Hershey de Guzman as Rachel
- Mymy Davao as Elle
- Miggs Cuaderno as Botchok

== Production ==
Principal photography commenced on October 15, 2010.

== Ratings ==
According to AGB Nielsen Philippines' Mega Manila People/Individual television ratings, the pilot episode of Little Star earned a 5.6% rating. The final episode scored a 7.7% rating.

== Accolades ==
Accolades received by Little Star
Year	Award	Category	Recipient	Result	Ref.
2011	25th PMPC Star Awards for Television	Best Daytime Drama Series	Little Star	Won	
