= Jillian: Namamasko Po =

Philippine television drama series

- Title card
- Also known as: Jillian, The Christmas Doll; Jillian
- Genre: Comedy drama; Fantasy
- Directed by: Mark A. Reyes V
- Starring: Jillian Ward
- Opening theme: "Kumukutikutitap" by Jillian Ward
- Country of origin: Philippines
- Original language: Tagalog
- No. of episodes: 40

Production
- Executive producer: Winnie Hollis-Reyes
- Production locations: Metro Manila, Philippines
- Camera setup: Multiple-camera setup
- Running time: 30–45 minutes
- Production company: GMA Entertainment TV

Original release
- Network: GMA Network
- Release: November 29, 2010 – January 21, 2011

Jillian: Namamasko Po (transl. Jillian: christmasing / international title: Jillian, The Christmas Doll) is a Philippine television drama comedy fantasy series broadcast by GMA Network. It stars Jillian Ward in the title role. It premiered on November 29, 2010 on the network's Telebabad line up. On January 13, 2011, the show was renamed as Jillian. The series concluded on January 21, 2011, with a total of 40 episodes.

The series is streaming online on YouTube.

== Cast and characters ==
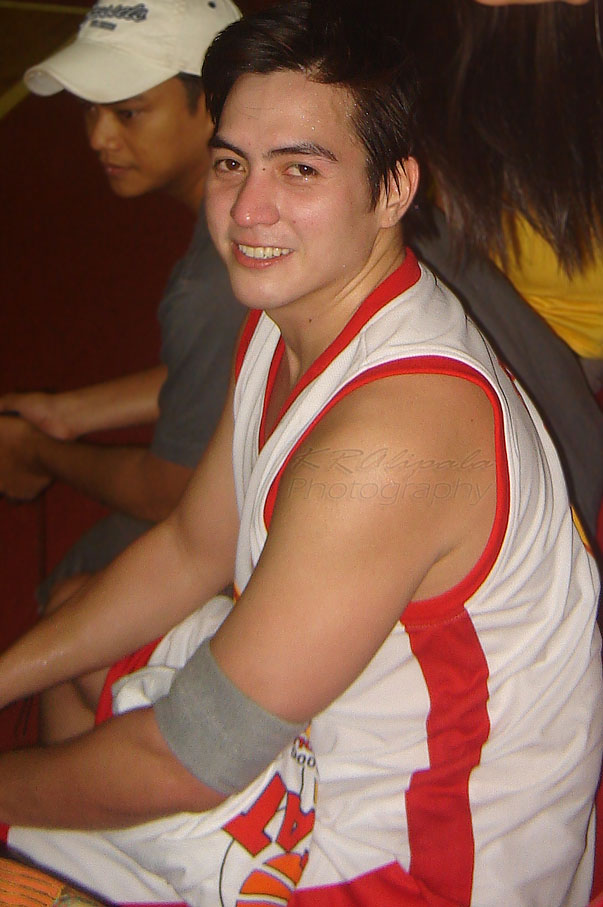
Wendell Ramos portrays Nelson Rivera.

Lead cast

- Jillian Ward as Jillian the Doll

Supporting cast

- Claudine Barretto as Lynette "Lynn" Rivera
- Wendell Ramos as Nelson Rivera

Guest cast

- Michael V. as Santa Claus / Nick
- Daniella Amable as Dolly Rivera
- Marian Rivera as Odessa Fuentes
- Yul Servo as Roberto
- Sherilyn Reyes as Carmen
- Chinggoy Alonzo as Victor
- Diva Montelaba as Sarah
- Carla Abellana as Joyce
- Nathalie Hart as Maya
- Gabby Eigenmann as Andre
- Danica Robles as Meding
- Sunshine Garcia as Andre's wife
- Paulo Avelino as James
- Enzo Pineda as Ace
- Dennis Trillo as Danny
- Jennylyn Mercado as Cecile
- Tirso Cruz III as R
- Yogo Singh as Habagat
- Ryan Eigenmann as Rico
- Arthur Solinap as himself
- Christopher de Leon as Dante Molina
- Sam Pinto as Lissa Molina
- Mark Herras as Bart Molina
- Barbie Forteza as Maggie Molina
- Eddie Garcia as Zaldy
- Luz Valdez as Virgie
- Neil Coleta as Junior
- Bernadette Alysson as Minnie
- Ian Veneracion as Migs
- Maureen Larrazabal as Lizzie
- Ynna Asistio as Jenny
- Buboy Villar
- Carlo Gonzales as Franco
- Nova Villa as Claus
- Diana Zubiri as Francine
- Grecila Rosales as Kate
- Chynna Ortaleza as Mavic
- Kiko Rustia as Noel
- Diego Llorico as Francine's friend

== Production ==
Principal photography commenced on November 18, 2010. Filming concluded on January 18, 2011.

== Ratings ==
According to AGB Nielsen Philippines' Mega Manila People/Individual television ratings, the pilot episode of Jillian: Namamasko Po earned a 10.7% rating. The final episode scored an 11.8% rating.
