= Dangal (TV series) =

2006 Philippine television drama series

- Title card
- Also known as: Now and Forever: Dangal; Honor
- Genre: Drama
- Developed by: Don Michael Perez
- Written by: Don Michael Perez; Kit Villanueva-Langit; Des Garbes-Severino; Luningning Interio-Ribay
- Directed by: Mac Alejandre
- Creative director: Roy Iglesias
- Starring: Jennylyn Mercado; Dennis Trillo
- Theme music composer: Vince de Jesus
- Opening theme: "Now and Forever" by Kyla
- Country of origin: Philippines
- Original language: Tagalog
- No. of episodes: 45

Production
- Executive producer: Camille Pengson
- Camera setup: Multiple-camera setup
- Running time: 30 minutes
- Production company: GMA Entertainment TV

Original release
- Network: GMA Network
- Release: September 25 – November 24, 2006

Dangal (trans. / international title: Honor) is a 2006 Philippine television drama series broadcast by GMA Network. The series is the seventh and final instalment of Now and Forever. Directed by Mac Alejandre, it stars Jennylyn Mercado and Dennis Trillo. It premiered on September 25, 2006. The series concluded on November 24, 2006, with a total of 45 episodes.

== Cast and characters ==
Cast

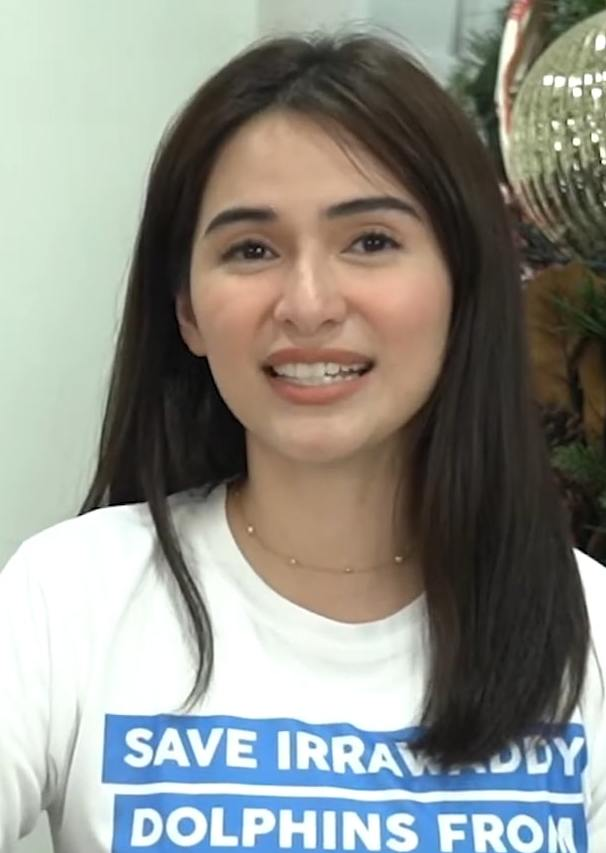
Jennylyn Mercado

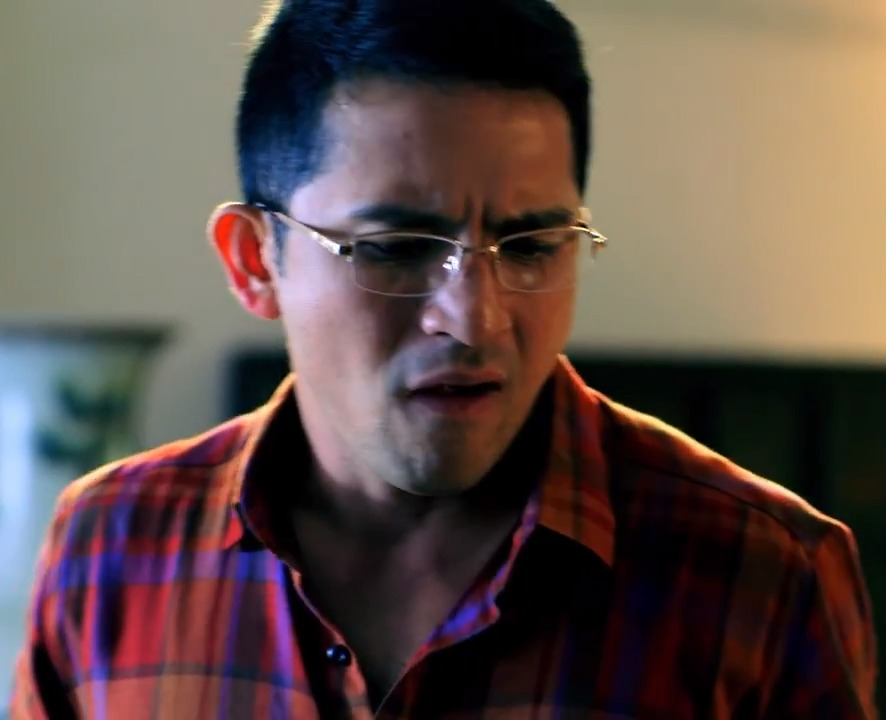
Dennis Trillo

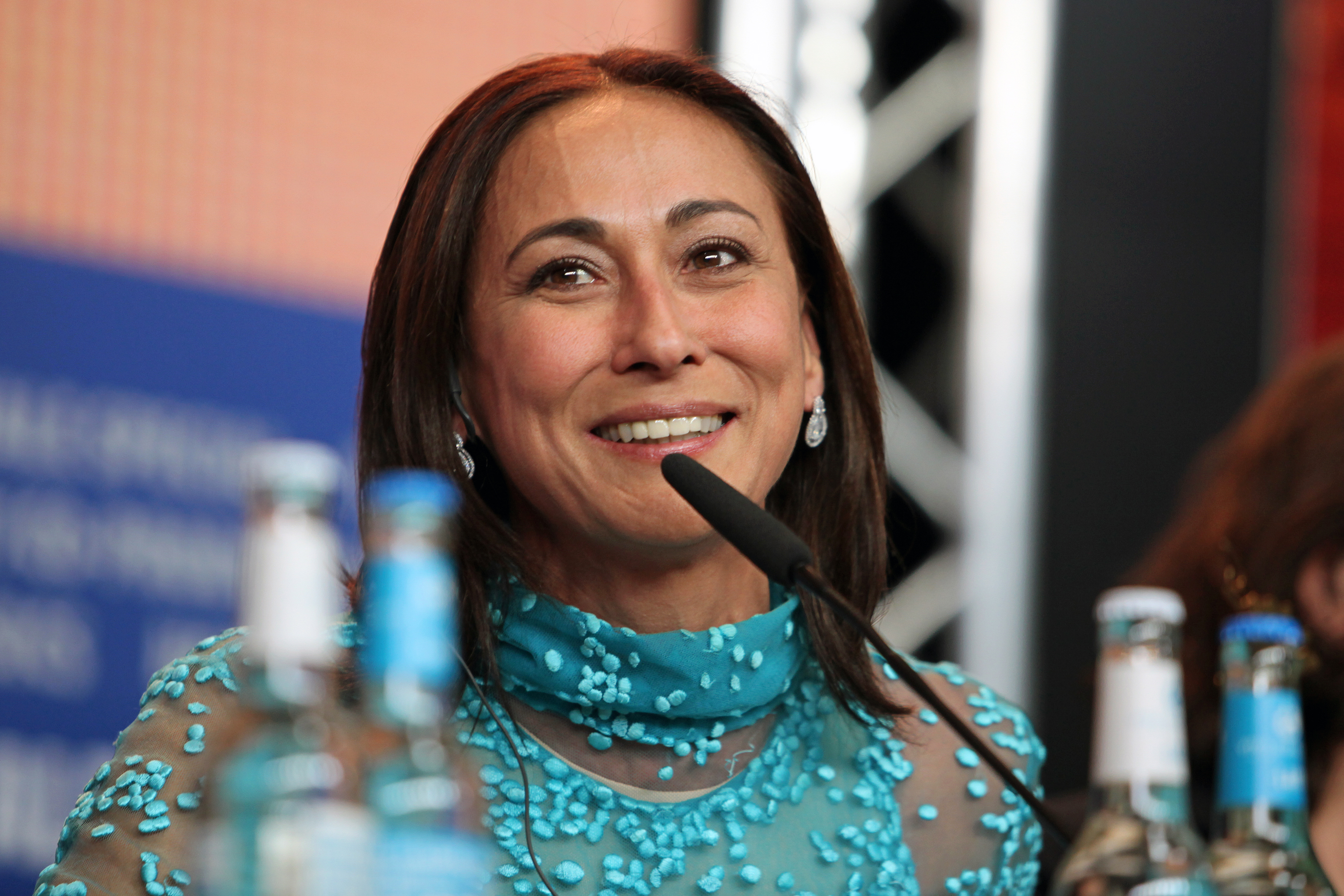
Cherie Gil

Lead cast

- Jennylyn Mercado as Altamira "Alta" Roxas-Marquez
- Dennis Trillo as Adrianno "Adrian" Marquez

Supporting cast

- Desiree del Valle as Giovanna Guillermo-Roxas
- Cherie Gil as Chandra Remedios
- Melissa Mendez as Corrina Roxas-Marquez
- Mat Ranillo III as Ricardo Marquez
- Ciara Sotto as Celestina "Celestine" Soledad
- Katya Santos as Lianna "Iyanna" Regalado
- Ella Cruz as Florentina "Flor" Gonzavo
- Polo Ravales as Miguelito "Miguel" Dominguez
- Andrew Schimmer as Inigo Regalado
