= Rhodora X =

2014 Philippine television drama series

- Title card
- Genre: Drama thriller
- Created by: Richard "Dode" Cruz
- Written by: Des Garbes-Severino; Onay Sales; Ken de Leon; Jules Katanyag
- Directed by: Albert Langitan
- Creative director: Jun Lana
- Starring: Jennylyn Mercado
- Theme music composer: Rebel Magdagasang
- Opening theme: "Sa Hatinggabi" by Jennylyn Mercado and Yasmien Kurdi
- Composer: Agatha Obar Morallos
- Country of origin: Philippines
- Original language: Tagalog
- No. of episodes: 88

Production
- Executive producers: Arlene Pilapil; Rebya Upalda
- Production locations: Quezon City, Philippines
- Editors: Mike Donald Robles; Robert Pancho; Jeron Suner
- Camera setup: Multiple-camera setup
- Running time: 22–47 minutes
- Production company: GMA Entertainment TV

Original release
- Network: GMA Network
- Release: January 27 – May 30, 2014

Rhodora X is a 2014 Philippine television drama thriller series broadcast by GMA Network. Directed by Albert Langitan, it stars Jennylyn Mercado in the title role. It premiered on January 27, 2014, on the network's Telebabad line up. The series concluded on May 30, 2014, with a total of 88 episodes.

The series is streaming online on YouTube.

== Cast and characters ==
Cast

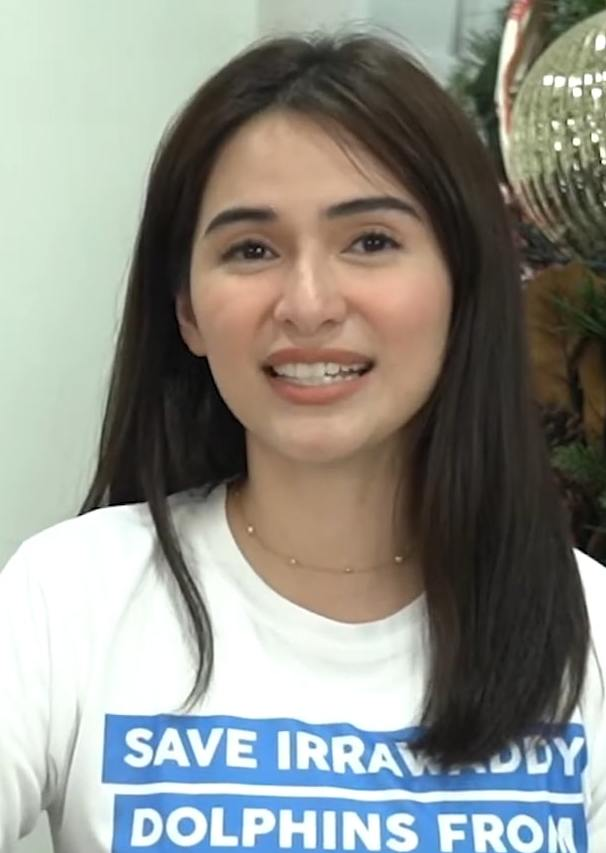
Jennylyn Mercado

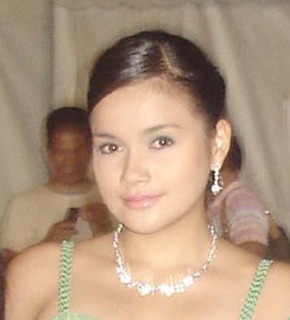
Yasmien Kurdi

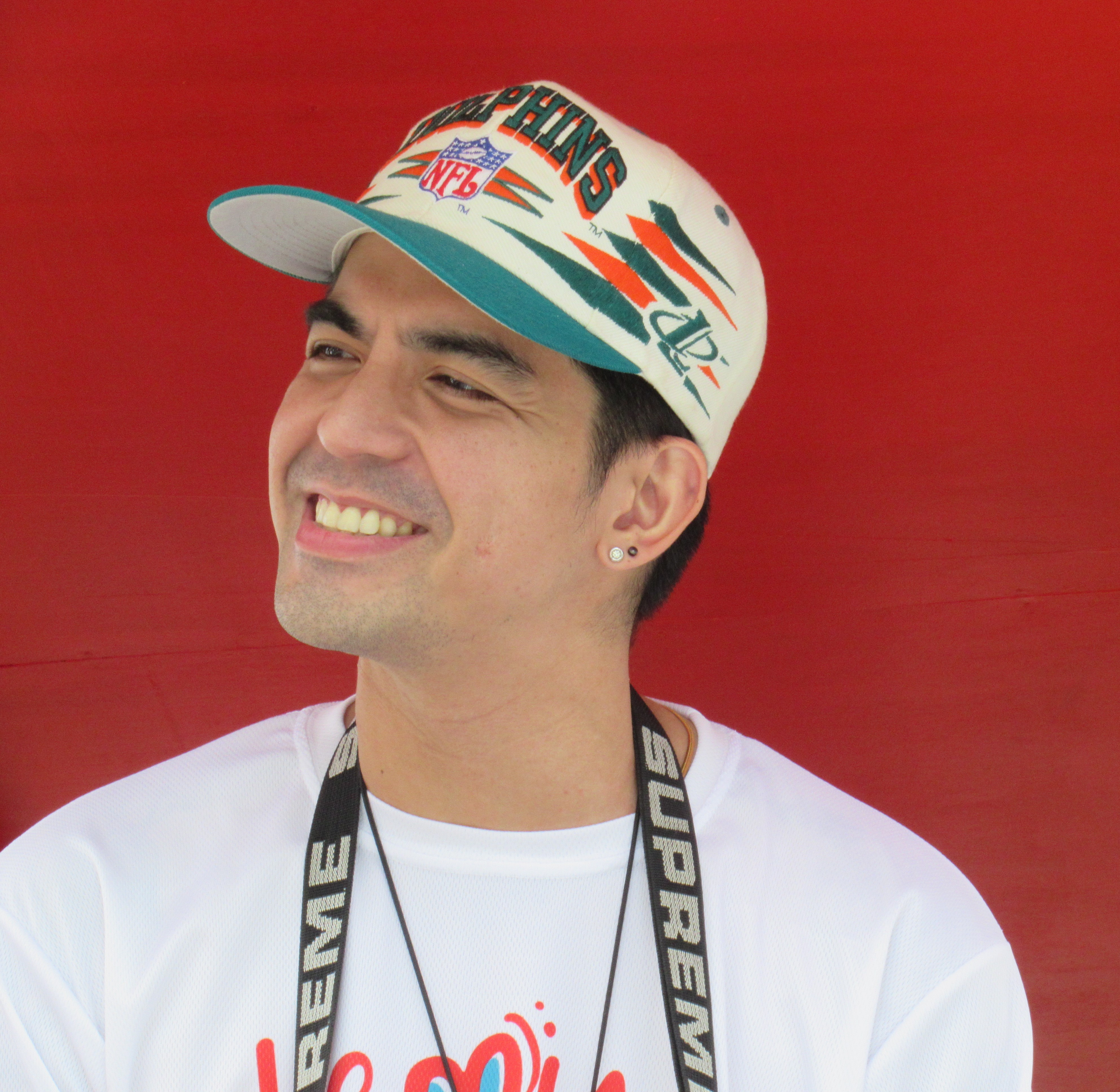
Mark Herras

Lead cast

- Jennylyn Mercado as Rhodora Ferrer-Vasquez / Roxanne Ferrer-Vasquez / Rowena

Supporting cast

- Yasmien Kurdi as Angela Ferrer-Aquino
- Mark Herras as Joaquin Vasquez
- Mark Anthony Fernandez as Nico Ledesma
- Frank Magalona as Santiago "Santi" Vasquez
- Vaness del Moral as Pia Sales-Alcantara
- Gardo Versoza as Derick Ferrer
- Glydel Mercado as Lourdes Sales-Ferrer
- Lollie Mara as Carmencita "Cita" Vasquez
- Irma Adlawan as Vivian Bautista
- Boots Anson-Roa as Amparo "Panchang" Sales

Guest cast

- Rez Cortez as a kidnapper
- Kiel Rodriguez as a kidnapper
- Gene Padilla as Peter
- Krista Miller as Tricia
- Carlo Gonzales as a bar customer
- Ken Chan as Ryan Ledesma
- Rafa Siguion-Reyna as a bar manager
- Ervic Vijandre as Ferdinand "Ferds" Salazar
- Jackie Lou Blanco as a lawyer
- Glaiza de Castro as a prisoner
- Martin del Rosario as Martin Aquino
- Kyle Ocampo as younger Angela
- Ar Angel Aviles as younger Rhodora
- Therese Malvar as younger Roxanne
- Antone Luis Limgengco
- Sarah Lopez
- Phytos Ramirez as Danny

== Production ==
Principal photography commenced in November 2013. On January 27, 2014, Actress Jennylyn Mercado was stung by a jellyfish during filming.

== Ratings ==
According to AGB Nielsen Philippines' Mega Manila household television ratings, the pilot episode of Rhodora X earned a 15.8% rating. The final episode scored an 18.9% rating.

== Accolades ==
Accolades received by Rhodora X
Year	Award	Category	Recipient	Result	Ref.
2014	Yahoo! Celebrity Awards	Female Kontrabida of the Year	Jennylyn Mercado	Won	
2014	PEP Awards Year 2	Editor's Choice Teleserye Actress	Jennylyn Mercado	Won	
