= Gumapang Ka sa Lusak (TV series) =

2010 Philippine television drama series

- Title card
- Also known as: Secret Affairs
- Genre: Drama
- Created by: Ricardo Lee
- Based on: Gumapang Ka sa Lusak (1990) by Lino Brocka
- Directed by: Maryo J. de los Reyes
- Starring: Dennis Trillo; Jennylyn Mercado
- Theme music composer: Jose Ma. Bartolome; Nonong Buencamino
- Opening theme: "Gumapang Ka sa Lusak" by Eva Castillo
- Country of origin: Philippines
- Original language: Tagalog
- No. of episodes: 92

Production
- Executive producer: Mona Coles-Mayuga
- Camera setup: Multiple-camera setup
- Running time: 30–45 minutes
- Production company: GMA Entertainment TV

Original release
- Network: GMA Network
- Release: February 8 – June 18, 2010

Gumapang Ka sa Lusak (transl. you crawl in bog / international title: Secret Affairs) is a 2010 Philippine television drama series broadcast by GMA Network. Based on a 1990 Philippine film of the same title, the series is the nineteenth instalment of Sine Novela. Directed by Maryo J. de los Reyes, it stars Dennis Trillo and Jennylyn Mercado. It premiered on February 8, 2010, on the network's Dramarama sa Hapon line up. The series concluded on June 18, 2010, with a total of 92 episodes.

== Cast and characters ==
Cast

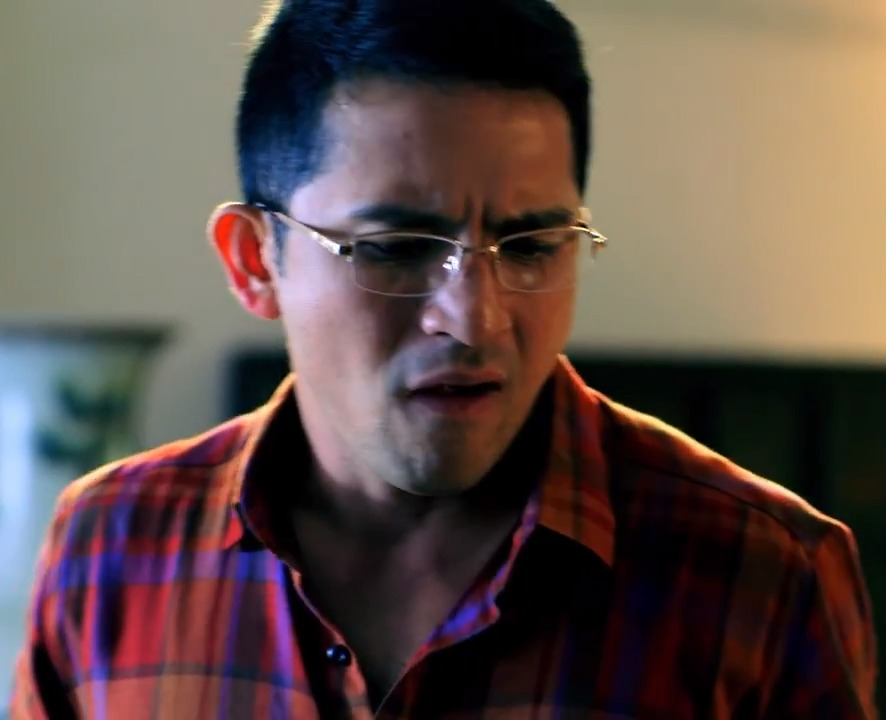
Dennis Trillo

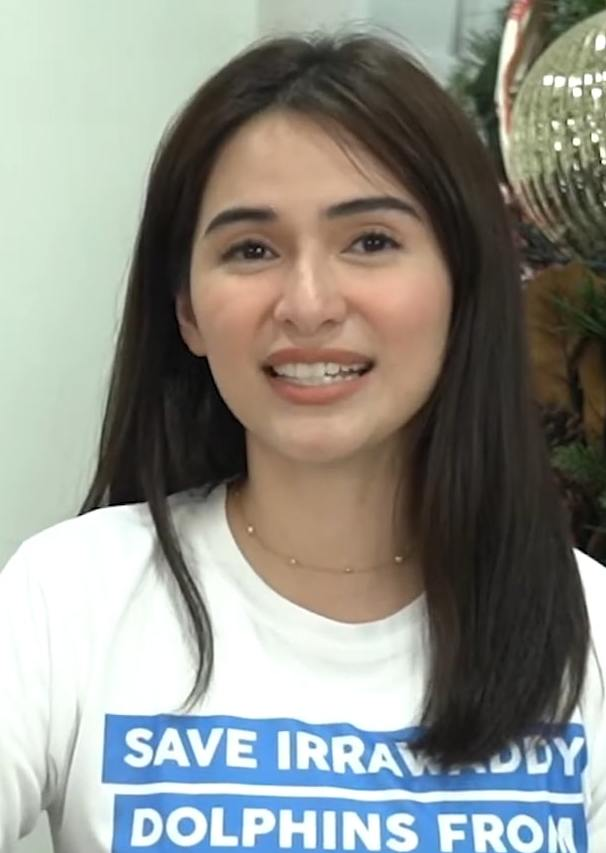
Jennylyn Mercado

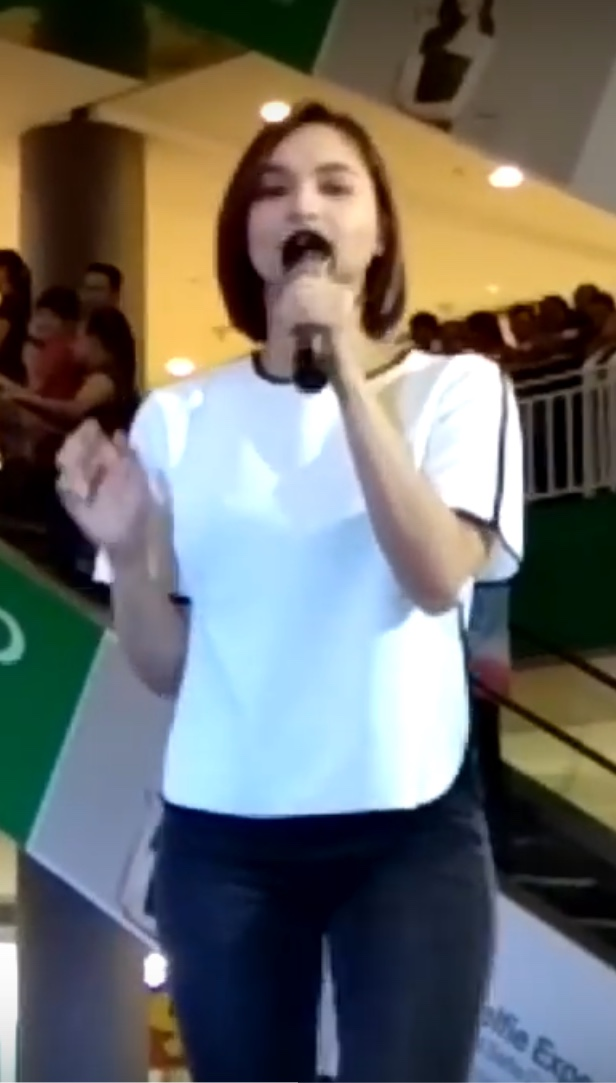
Ryza Cenon

Lead cast

- Dennis Trillo as Levi
- Jennylyn Mercado as Rachel Mantaring

Supporting cast

- Al Tantay as Edmundo Guatlo
- Sandy Andolong as Rowena Tuazon-Guatlo
- Glydel Mercado as Anita Ramiro
- Julio Diaz as Mateo Mantaring
- Lotlot De Leon as Linda Mantaring
- Ronnie Lazaro as Falcon
- Rocco Nacino as RJ Guatlo
- Ryza Cenon as Apple Madrigal
- Martin Escudero as Jonathan Guatlo
- Prince Stefan as Dodo Gaspar III
- Vaness del Moral as Gina Mantaring
- Shaun Rodriguez as Boni
- Luz Valdez as Isang
- Michael Sandico as Ricardo Guatlo
- Jolly Molly as Andrea
- Jamilla Obispo as Joana
- Patricia Ismael as Beauty

Guest cast

- Myra Ocampo as Clarissa
- Enzo Pineda as Elmer
- Sarah Lahbati as Mika
- Gail Lardizabal as a mayor

== Production ==
Principal photography commenced in January 2010.

== Ratings ==
According to AGB Nielsen Philippines' Mega Manila household television ratings, the pilot episode of Gumapang Ka sa Lusak earned a 17.1% rating. The final episode scored a 5.6% rating in Mega Manila People/Individual television ratings.
