= Sanggang-Dikit FR =

Philippine television drama series

- Title card
- Also known as: Hearts on the Badge
- Genre: Police procedural; Action comedy; Drama
- Based on: Sanggang Dikit (1983)
- Directed by: L.A. Madridejos
- Starring: Jennylyn Mercado; Dennis Trillo
- Opening theme: "Saan Ka Tatakbo" by Garrett Bolden
- Country of origin: Philippines
- Original language: Tagalog
- No. of episodes: 160

Production
- Production locations: Metro Manila, Philippines
- Camera setup: Multiple camera setup
- Running time: 24–35 minutes
- Production company: GMA Entertainment Group

Original release
- Network: GMA Network
- Release: June 23, 2025 – January 30, 2026

Sanggang-Dikit FR (pronounced as Sanggang-Dikit For Real) (transl. stick-together FR / international title: Hearts on the Badge) is a Philippine television drama action series broadcast by GMA Network. The series is based on a 1983 Philippine film, Sanggang Dikit. Directed by L.A. Madridejos, it stars Jennylyn Mercado and Dennis Trillo. It premiered on June 23, 2025, on the network's Prime line up. The series concluded on January 30, 2026, with a total of 160 episodes.

The series is streaming online on YouTube.

== Cast and characters ==
Cast

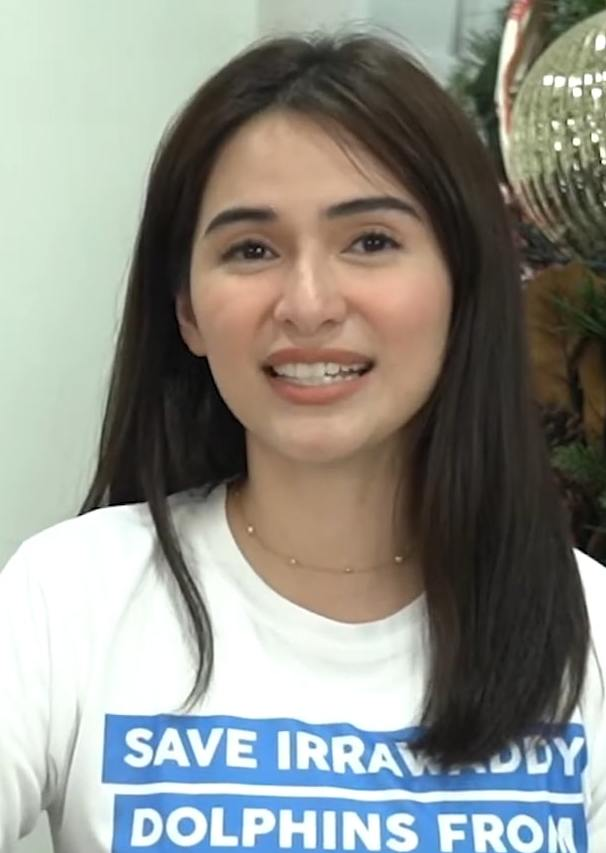
Jennylyn Mercado

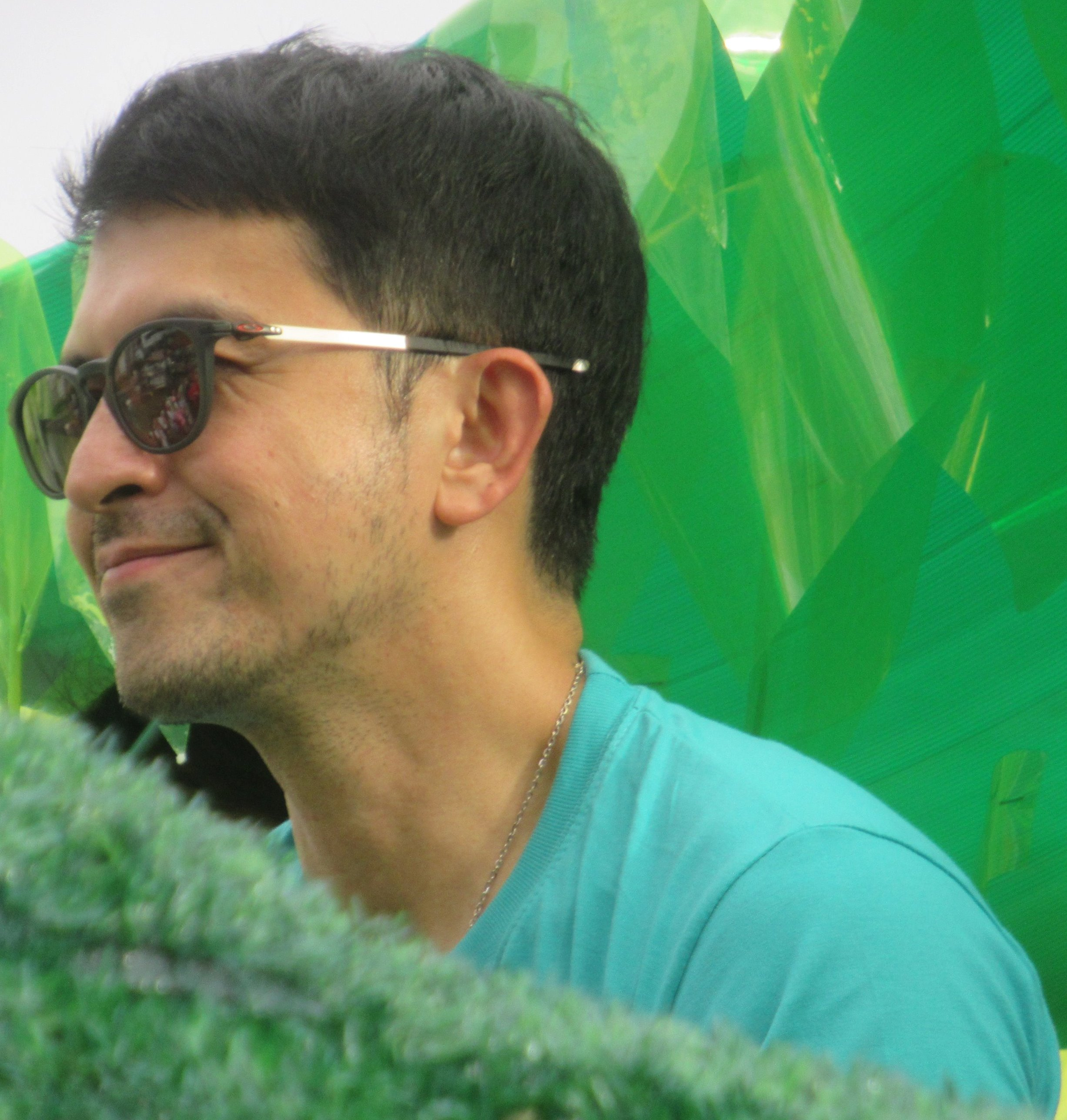
Dennis Trillo

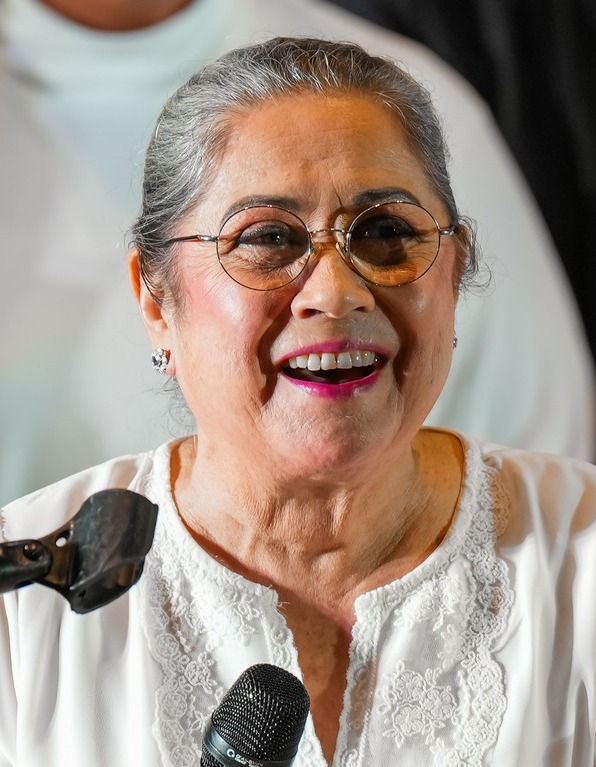
Nova Villa

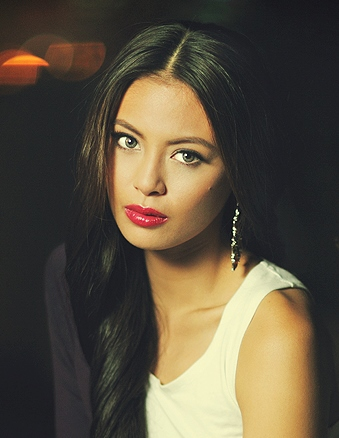
Sam Pinto

Lead cast

- Jennylyn Mercado as Roberta "Bobby" Enriquez
- Dennis Trillo as Antonio "Tonyo" Conde

Supporting cast

- Allen Dizon as Rodolfo Flores
- Roi Vinzon as Juaquin Guerrero
- Nova Villa as Isang
- Al Tantay as Victor "Amo" Santiago
- Marina Benipayo as Sophia Guerrero
- Jeffrey Santos as Roman
- Sam Pinto as Cecilia Montero
- Joross Gamboa as Eric Garcia
- Liezel Lopez as Selena Madrigal
- Juancho Trivino as Glen Guerrero
- Chanty Videla as Mira Torres
- Zonia Mejia as Faye Guerrero
- Kim Perez
- Matthew Uy as Vince de Leon
- Seb Pajarillo as Jake Noble
- John Vic De Guzman as Regan Robles
- Kiel Rodriguez as Fred Dizon
- James Lucero as Jaime Torres
- Jess Martinez as Josie Bautista
- David "Tito Abdul" Domanais as Abdul Santos
- Christian Kimp "Tito Marsy" Atip as Mar dela Cruz
- Abi Marquez as Abi Martes
- Shernan
- Zaito
- Ayanna Misola as Apple
- Alona Navarro as Peach

Guest cast

- Glydel Mercado as Dina Manalo
- Elle Villanueva as Lara Valdez
- Arthur Solinap as Carlo Manalo
- Patricia Coma as Reign Manalo
- Mikee Quintos as Tere
- Buboy Villar as Caloy
- Royce Cabrera as Sandro Paloma
- Ji Soo as Woo
- Janus del Prado as Brando "Daga" Salazar
- Che Ramos as Leslie del Mundo
- Katrina Halili as Charlie Samson
- Michael Roy Jornales as Markus
- Betong Sumaya as Pong Marasigan
- Will Ashley as Wilbert Mariano
- Conan O'Brien

== Development ==
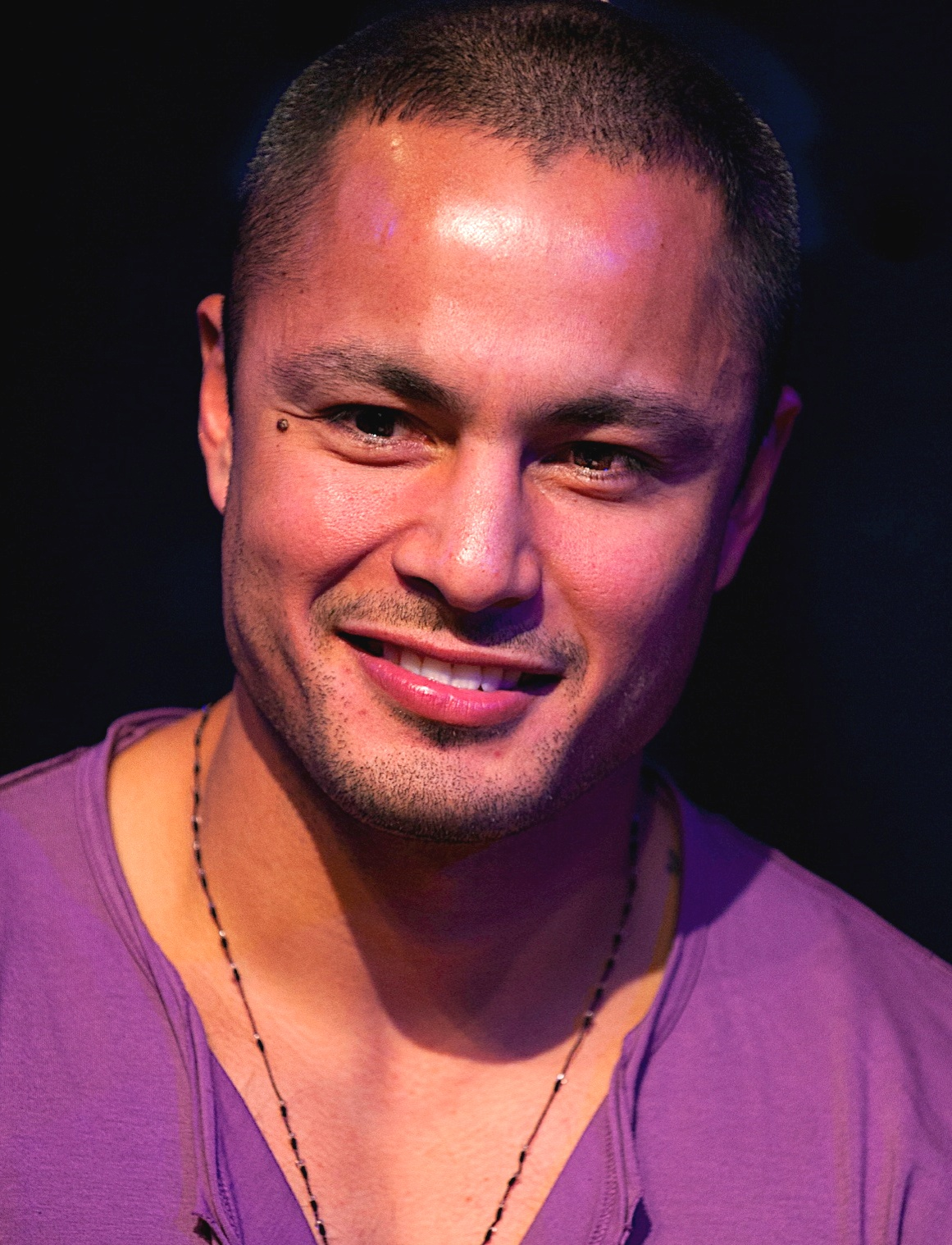
Derek Ramsay was attached to the series, with former girlfriend Andrea Torres

In January 2018, the series was first announced by GMA Network Inc.. The series is based on a Philippine film, Sanggang Dikit released in 1983. In January 2020, it was once again announced by GMA Network, with Philippine actress Andrea Torres and actor Derek Ramsay attached for the lead roles. Due to the COVID-19 pandemic, production was put on hold. In December 2020, the production was affected due to the relationship break up of Torres and Ramsay in November, causing uncertainties to the state of the series. By March 2021, it was shelved.

In January 2025, the series was announced for GMA Network's Prime line up, along with actress-singer Jennylyn Mercado and actor Dennis Trillo as the lead cast of the series. Mercado studied jujutsu and gun shooting, in preparation for the role.

== Production ==
Principal photography commenced on March 10, 2025. Additional scenes were shot in Milan, Zurich and Dubai. Filming concluded on January 16, 2026.

== Ratings ==
According to AGB Nielsen Philippines' Nationwide Urban Television Audience Measurement People in television homes, the pilot episode of Sanggang-Dikit FR scored an 8.2% rating. The finale episode earned a 7.2% rating.
