= Everything About My Wife =

2025 Filipino romantic comedy film

- Theatrical release poster
- Directed by: Real S. Florido
- Written by: Rona Co
- Based on: A Boyfriend for My Wife by Pablo Solarz
- Produced by: Nessa S. Valdellon; Annette Gozon-Valdes; Real S. Florido
- Starring: Jennylyn Mercado; Dennis Trillo; Sam Milby
- Cinematography: Lee Meily
- Edited by: Noah Tonga
- Music by: Paulo Protacio
- Production companies: GMA Pictures; CreaZion Studios; Glimmer Studio
- Distributed by: GMA Pictures
- Release date: February 26, 2025
- Running time: 110 minutes
- Country: Philippines
- Language: Filipino

Everything About My Wife is a 2025 Philippine romantic comedy film directed by Real S. Florido and written by Rona Co. Starring Dennis Trillo, Jennylyn Mercado and Sam Milby, the story follows a timid husband who hires a professional Casanova to seduce his seemingly perfect but fearsome wife, hoping this will make her divorce him.

Produced by GMA Pictures, CreaZion Studios, and Glimmer Studio, film was released in theaters on February 26, 2025. It is a remake of the Argentine film A Boyfriend for My Wife.

== Plot ==
A man in an unhappy marriage, unsure of how to end things with his wife, seeks the help of a charming womanizer to lure her away so she will leave him. However, as he observes his wife's growing connection with Casanova, his perception of her begins to shift, and eventually, he concludes that he's committed one of the gravest errors a husband can make.

== Cast ==
- Dennis Trillo as Dominic Brizuela
- Jennylyn Mercado as Imogen Karuhatan
- Sam Milby as Miguel
- Carmi Martin as Mrs. Brizuela, Imogen's Mother-in-Law
- Ruby Ruiz as Kapitana
- Nova Villa as Lola Yogi
- Isay Alvarez as Madam B
- Romnick Sarmienta as Atty. Marlon
- Bart Guingona as Mr. Macatangay
- Xena Ramos as Shirley
- Donna Cariaga as Sophia
- Polo Laurel as Arnold
- Joyce "Joyang" Glorioso as Che-che, Pussy Cafe employee
- Alex Agustin as Ciarra
- Annette Gozon-Valdes as Atty. Cathy
- Chico Alicaya as Electrical lineman
