= The Prenup =

- Theatrical release poster
- Directed by: Jun Robles Lana
- Screenplay by: Jun Robles Lana; Denoy Navarro-Punio
- Produced by: Lily Y. Monteverde; Roselle Y. Monteverde
- Starring: Jennylyn Mercado; Sam Milby
- Cinematography: Carlo Mendoza
- Edited by: Vito Cajili
- Music by: Emerzon Texon
- Production companies: Regal Entertainment; Regal Multimedia, Inc.
- Distributed by: Regal Entertainment
- Release date: October 14, 2015
- Running time: 118 minutes
- Country: Philippines
- Languages: Filipino; English
- Box office: ₱38 million

The Prenup is a 2015 Filipino romantic comedy film starring Jennylyn Mercado and Sam Milby. It is written and directed by Jun Lana. It was released on October 14, 2015, by Regal Entertainment.

The film is about two people meet on a plane and fall in love in New York. They're all set to get married back in the Philippines, but the guy's rich parents are suspicious of the girl's intentions and insist on a prenuptial agreement.

== Plot ==
Wendy (Jennylyn Mercado) is a woman who goes to the United States to meet her biological father. On board the plane, she meets Sean (Sam Milby). Wendy and Sean initially have a cat-dog relationship but they eventually warm up to each other. When her biological father fails to accommodate her, Sean invites Wendy to stay in his apartment. They fall in love with each other and decide to get married.

However, when they return to the Philippines, they become frustrated when their families don't get along. The rich guy's parents (Jaclyn Jose) and (Freddie Webb) insist that Wendy sign a prenuptial agreement. Their lives become even more complicated when Wendy's parents (Dominic Ochoa) and (Gardo Versoza) add their own clauses to the prenup.

== Cast ==
=== Main cast ===
- Jennylyn Mercado as Wendy Cayabyab
- Sam Milby as Sean Billones

=== Supporting cast ===
- Melai Cantiveros as Choosy Cayabyab
- Ella Cruz as Mocha Cayabyab
- Gardo Versoza as Agaton Cayabyab
- Dominic Ochoa as Edgar Cayabyab
- Jaclyn Jose as Sofia Billones
- Freddie Webb as Alfonso Billones
- Neil Coleta as Boom Billones
- Kryshee Grengia as Pia Billones
- Ashley Cabrera as Lilet Billones

== Reception ==
=== Box office ===
The Prenup, starring Jennylyn Mercado and Sam Milby, performed well in the box-office during its opening day. According to producer Regal Films, this rom-com was able to gross P8 million when it opened in cinemas on October 14. Directed by Jun Lana, this movie partly shot in New York has been graded B by the Cinema Evaluation Board and rated PG by MTRCB. According to Box Office Mojo, The Prenup was able to gross PhP20,470,499.00 during its opening weekend, making it the top grosser debut film for the period of October 14–18, 2015.

On Oct, 21 - 25 The Prenup was able to gross P37,684,754, According to Box Office Mojo.

=== Critical response ===
The Prenup has received mixed reviews.

Oggs Cruz from Rappler, described the movie in his review as "The romance the film serves is an idealistic one, a figment of fantasy rather than the core of a discourse." He also described the film as "cleverly subtle in its being subversive. The predictable story Lana has written is blunt in its depiction of true love, whether or not it is depicted within the realm of what is real and possible."

However, a review from LionhearTV praises Mercado's acting chops "Jennylyn Mercado is, no doubt, the film’s biggest star, and her endearing character, is what keeping everything tolerable and decent, when everything else is going downhill. Mercado’s believable delivery make her star shine the most here, placing her character both at the emotional and comic cores of the story."

Nazamel Tabares from Movies Philippines blog also commended Mercado's performance as "quirkiness and charm drives the film in an entertaining and funny way." and also cited that "The Prenup safely puts these elements for the audiences’ to have deeper connection to the film. Everything could have been better especially establishing the leads’ romantic chemistry and maybe a more clever ending but The Prenup has enough Jennylyn Mercado for the audience to enjoy every bit of it."

== See also ==
- List of Filipino films in 2015
