= English Only, Please =

- Threatical Movie Poster
- Directed by: Dan Villegas
- Screenplay by: Antoinette Jadaone; Anjeli Pessumal
- Story by: Antoinette Jadaone; Dan Villegas
- Produced by: Joji Alonso; Eduardo Rocha; Edgar Mangahas; Fernando Ortigas
- Starring: Jennylyn Mercado; Derek Ramsay
- Cinematography: Dan Villegas
- Edited by: Marya Ignacio
- Music by: Emerzon Texon
- Production companies: Quantum Films; MJM Productions; Tuko Film Productions; Buchi Boy Films
- Distributed by: Quantum Films
- Release date: December 25, 2014
- Running time: 115 minutes
- Country: Philippines
- Language: Filipino
- Box office: ₱135 million

English Only, Please is a 2014 Filipino romantic comedy film directed by Dan Villegas and co-written by Antoinette Jadaone and Anjeli Pessumal from a story by Villegas and Jadaone. The film stars Jennylyn Mercado and Derek Ramsay.

Produced by Quantum Films, in association with MJM Productions, Tuko Film Productions, and Buchi Boy Films, the film was theatrically released on December 25, 2014, as an official entry to the 40th Metro Manila Film Festival.

== Plot ==
Julian Parker comes to Manila from New York with one goal: to perfectly dictate a Filipino translation of his angry letter to his half-Pinay ex-girlfriend Megan with the help of the perky Filipino-English tutor he hired online. Tere Madlansacay is a top-notch Filipino-English tutor. She is strict and feisty and takes pride in teaching English and/or Filipino to more than 142 Americans, Fil-Ams, Koreans since 2006.

== Cast ==
=== Main cast ===
- Jennylyn Mercado as Tere Madlansacay, a Filipino tutor from the Philippines
- Derek Ramsay as Julian Parker, a Filipino-American from the States
- Kean Cipriano as Rico, Tere's "gold-digging, on-and-off" boyfriend
- Isabel "Lenlen" Frial as Kay-Kay, Mallows's witty daughter/Tere's goddaughter
- Cai Cortez as Mallows, Tere's best friend
- Jerald Napoles as "the manliligaw on the street"
- Lynn Ynchausti-Cruz as Tere's mother
- Ian de Leon as Tere's brother
- Jervy "Patani" Daño as Tere's mare

=== Special Participation ===
- Isabel Oli as Megan Montañer, Julian's ex-girlfriend
- Tom Rodriguez as Ernest, Megan's fiancée
- Meowfie as Jeepney Bystander

== Awards ==
- 40th Metro Manila Film Festival 2014
  - Best Picture: 2nd Place
  - Best Actor: Derek Ramsay
  - Best Actress: Jennylyn Mercado
  - Best Director: Dan Villegas
  - Best Story: Antoinette Jadaone and Dan Villegas
  - Best Screenplay: Antoinette Jadaone and Anj Pessumal
  - Best Editor: Marya Ignacio
