= Just the 3 of Us =

- Theatrical movie poster
- Directed by: Cathy Garcia-Molina
- Written by: Kiko Abrillo; Gillian Ebreo; Katherine Labayen; Vanessa R. Valdez; Cathy Garcia-Molina
- Produced by: Charo Santos-Concio; Malou N. Santos
- Starring: John Lloyd Cruz; Jennylyn Mercado
- Cinematography: Noel Teehankee
- Edited by: Marya Ignacio
- Music by: Jessie Lasaten
- Production company: ABS-CBN Film Productions
- Distributed by: Star Cinema
- Release date: May 4, 2016 (Philippines)
- Running time: 120 minutes
- Country: Philippines
- Language: Filipino
- Box office: ₱230 million

Just the 3 of Us is a 2016 Philippine romantic comedy-drama film directed by Cathy Garcia-Molina from a story and screenplay she co-wrote with Kiko Abrillo, Gillian Ebreo, Katherine Labayen, and Vanessa R. Valdez. Starring John Lloyd Cruz and Jennylyn Mercado in their first film project together, the film revolves around a flight attendant who is deeply infatuated with a pilot. It also features the supporting cast including Joel Torre, Ketchup Eusebio, and Maria Isabel Lopez, and a cameo appearance by Richard Yap.

Produced and distributed by Star Cinema, the film was theatrically released on May 4, 2016. It received critical and commercial success.

== Synopsis ==
The film revolves around Uno Abusado (John Lloyd Cruz) and CJ Manalo (Jennylyn Mercado) who are both involved in the airline industry. The former is an airline pilot who aspires to be a captain and the latter is part of the ground crew who aspires to be a flight attendant. After a one night stand the two were forced to live together to deal with each other's contrasting personalities with Manalo now pregnant and claiming that Abusado is the father of her unborn child.

== Plot ==
CJ presents Uno her paternity test, but he tosses it asside, saying it doesn’t matter who the child belongs to anymore. He proposes to CJ, and she accepts.

During the credits, Hopia picks up the paternity test, and reads it. She happily informs Uno that he’s the father of CJ’s child.

== Cast ==
- John Lloyd Cruz as First Officer Juan Paulo "Uno" Abusado
- Jennylyn Mercado as Clara Josefa "CJ" Manalo
- Richard Yap as Captain Alexander "Alex" Gatchalian
- Joel Torre as Arturo Manalo
- Billy Roque as Jill
- Ketchup Eusebio as Tyson
- Maria Isabel Lopez as Lulu Manalo
- Joem Bascon as BJ Manalo
- Yana Asistio as Pauline
- Victor Silayan as Tim
- Fifth Solomon as Felix
- Manuel Chua as AJ Manalo
- PJ Endrinal as DJ Manalo
- Michael Agassi as Dexter
- Josef Elizalde as Jerome
- Jed Montero as Daisy
- Lucas Maggalang as FJ Manalo
- Paulo Angeles as EJ Manalo
- Baron Geisler as Marco
- Chun Sa Jung as Hopia

== Release ==
The film's theatrical release was initially scheduled in March 2016. The scheduled released was moved to April 27, 2016, and later to May 4, 2016, to achieve simultaneous international screenings. The film was also simultaneously released internationally in selected cinemas in Australia, Canada, Malaysia, New Zealand, Singapore and the United States, as well as in the Middle East, Europe and Saipan in the Northern Mariana Islands.

=== Marketing ===
In late February 2016, the trailer for the film was released. The title of the film was revealed to the public through the trailer. Earlier, Jennylyn Mercado posted an image of her with John Lloyd Cruz at her official Facebook page announcing to the public of a then-upcoming Star Cinema film where she and John Lloyd Cruz would be paired together.

The official theatrical poster of Just the 3 of Us was released through Star Cinema's Instagram account on March 27, 2016. Jennylyn Mercado and John Lloyd Cruz made live appearance and also made guest appearances in GMA and ABS-CBN, their respective networks, to promote the film.

=== Music ===
The official theme song of the film is "Getting to Know Each Other", recorded by It's Showtime host Billy Crawford. It is a cover of the original by Gerard Kenny. The music video for the song premiered on April 5, 2016, via Star Music's YouTube channel. The music video stars real life couple Billy Crawford and Coleen Garcia.

== Reception ==
=== Box office ===
As of June 2016, Just the 3 of Us has grossed ₱230 million (US$4.9 million) worldwide.

==== Philippines ====
The film opened in the Philippines on May 4, alongside Viva Films' This Time. It made ₱16 million on its opening day compared to This Time with ₱15 million . This was confirmed on Mico del Rosario's Instagram account. On May 9, it breached the ₱100 million mark in the box office, the 3rd Filipino film in 2016 to reached the mark.

==== Other Countries ====
According to Box Office Mojo, on their first week of showing on United Arab Emirates it earned $128,630 in its opening week . While on United Kingdom it earned $14,437, on New Zealand it earned $3,373, and on Australia it earned $20,282.

=== Critical reception ===
Just the 3 of Us received mixed to positive reviews from film critics.

Movies Philippines gave a mixed review, saying that "Just The 3 Of Us is everything you love about John Lloyd and Jennylyn in one movie. Their charms, their ability to make people laugh effortlessly and of course their effectiveness in dramatic scenes. But it’s disappointing to see them in a Star Cinema formula, though tried and tested, it still feels tired." with a rating of 3 stars out of 5. Oggs Cruz from Rappler praised the two main actors, stating that "Cruz and Mercado seamlessly turn their characters’ errors and dysfunctions into anchors for affection."

Just the 3 of Us is graded B by the Cinema Evaluation Board of the Philippines (CEB).

== Possible sequel ==
Director Cathy Garcia-Molina, says that Star Cinema is planning a sequel for Just the 3 of Us if not another film starring Jennylyn Mercado and John Lloyd Cruz, following the film's box office feat.
