= My Faithful Husband =

2015 Philippine television drama series

- Title card
- Genre: Romantic drama
- Created by: Suzette Doctolero
- Written by: Suzette Doctolero; Angeli Delgado; Paul Sta. Ana
- Directed by: Joyce E. Bernal
- Creative director: Roy C. Iglesias
- Starring: Jennylyn Mercado; Dennis Trillo
- Theme music composer: Pearisha Abubakar
- Opening theme: "Hahanap-Hanapin Ka" by Rita Daniela
- Ending theme: "Ingatan Mo ang Salitang Mahal Kita" by Orlando Sol
- Country of origin: Philippines
- Original language: Tagalog
- No. of episodes: 70 (list of episodes)

Production
- Executive producer: Rebya P. Upalda
- Production locations: Quezon City, Philippines; Cavite, Philippines
- Editors: Robert Ryan Reyes; Noel S. Mauricio II
- Camera setup: Multiple-camera setup
- Running time: 26–36 minutes
- Production company: GMA Entertainment TV

Original release
- Network: GMA Network
- Release: August 10 – November 13, 2015

My Faithful Husband is a 2015 Philippine television drama romance series broadcast by GMA Network. Directed by Joyce E. Bernal, it stars Jennylyn Mercado and Dennis Trillo in the title role. It premiered on August 10, 2015, on the network's Telebabad line up. The series concluded on November 13, 2015, with a total of 70 episodes.

The series is streaming online on YouTube.

== Premise ==
Emman and Mel meet each other and become good friends. Mel finds out that she is pregnant with Dean's child and Emman claims the responsibility to be the child's father and offer to marry Mel. When Dean comes back to Mel's life, Mel gets confused about her feelings, and her weakness leads her to spend a night with Dean.

== Cast and characters ==
Cast

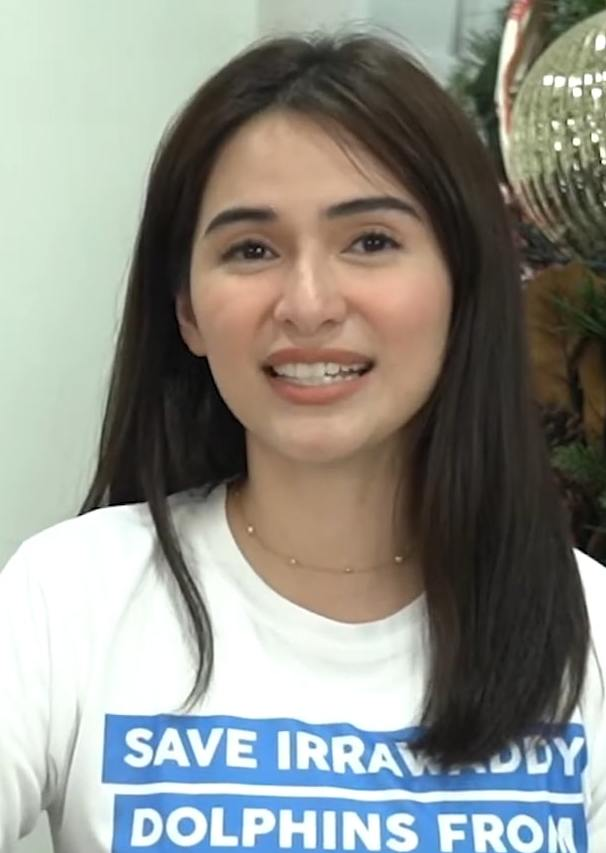
Jennylyn Mercado

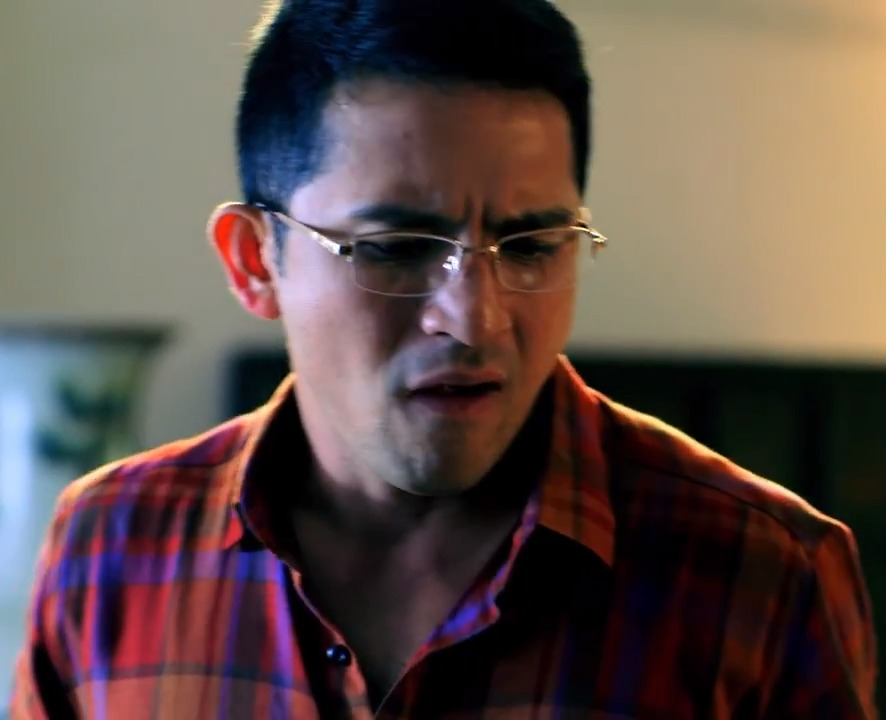
Dennis Trillo

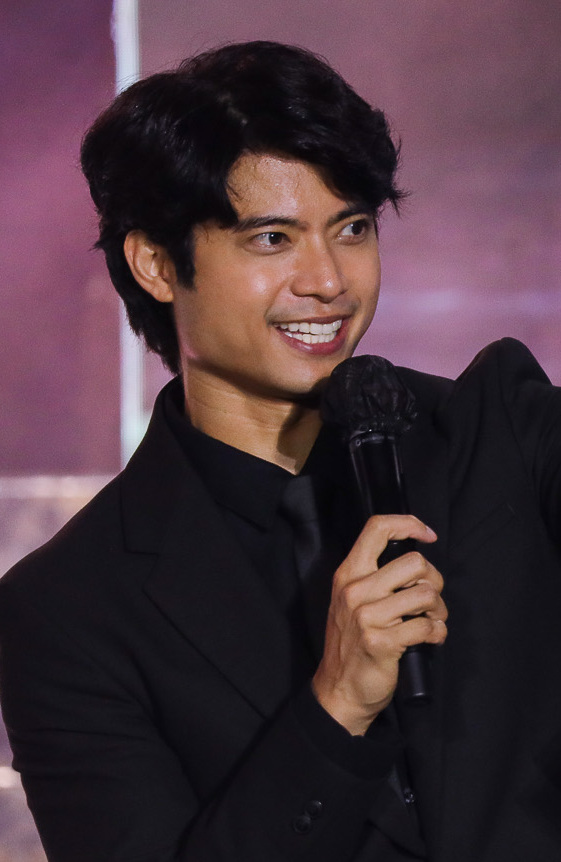
Mikael Daez

Lead cast

- Jennylyn Mercado as Melanie "Mel" Fernandez-Dela Paz
- Dennis Trillo as Emmanuel "Emman" Dela Paz

Supporting cast

- Mikael Daez as Dean Montenegro
- Louise delos Reyes as Mylene Fernandez-Sanreal
- Snooky Serna as Mercedes "Cedes" Dela Paz
- Rio Locsin as Carmen Beltran
- Ricky Davao as Arnaldo Castro
- Nonie Buencamino as Lorenz Castro
- Timmy Cruz as Elvira "Elvie" Castro
- Lloyd Samartino as Artemio Fernandez
- Kevin Santos as Dodong
- Jerald Napoles as Mars
- Jade Lopez as Doyee Dela Paz
- Julia Lee as Adelle
- Aaron Yanga as Dante Dela Paz
- Jazz Ocampo as Carla Dela Paz
- Rexcy Evert as Janet

Recurring cast

- Lynn Ynchausti-Cruz as Charito Montenegro-Castro
- Rich Asuncion as Soling
- Lance Serrano as Benjo
- Enzo Pineda as Arnel
- Coleen Perez as Michelle
- Mega Unciano as Ricky
- Zofia Quinit as Andrea "Ningning" F. Dela Paz
- Kim Margarette Belles as Aliyah Tanya "Ali" F. Montenegro

Guest cast

- Rodjun Cruz as younger Arnaldo
- Yasmien Kurdi as younger Mercedes
- Neil Ryan Sese as Pitargue
- Andrea Torres as Samantha "Sam" Fuentebella-Montenegro
- Mike Tan as Bradley "Brad" Sanreal
- Pinky Aseron as Rina Angeles
- Ronnie Henares as Amiel Montenegro

== Production ==
Principal photography commenced in July 2015.

== Ratings ==
According to AGB Nielsen Philippines' Mega Manila household television ratings, the pilot episode of My Faithful Husband earned a 17.6% rating. The final episode scored a 19.9% rating. The series had its highest rating on September 10, 2015, with a 20.7% rating. For its entire run, it had an average rating of 17.78%.

== Accolades ==
Accolades received by My Faithful Husband
Year	Award	Category	Recipient	Result	Ref.
2016	30th PMPC Star Awards for Television	Best Primetime Drama Series	My Faithful Husband	Nominated	
2016	30th PMPC Star Awards for Television	Best Drama Actor	Dennis Trillo	Nominated	
2016	30th PMPC Star Awards for Television	Best Drama Actress	Jennylyn Mercado	Won	
2016	30th PMPC Star Awards for Television	Best Drama Supporting Actress	Snooky Serna	Nominated	
