= Jennylyn Mercado =

Filipino actress (born 1987)

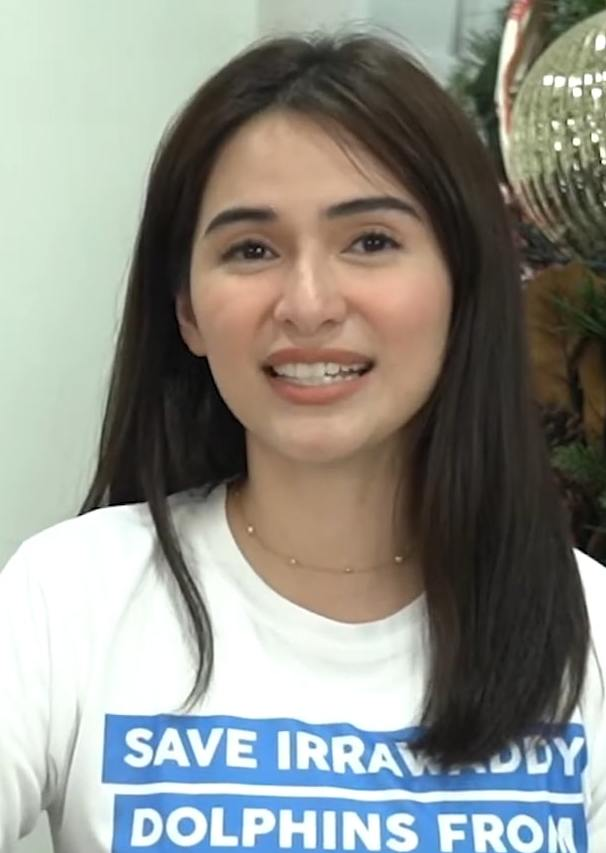
- Mercado in 2021
- Born: Jennylyn Anne Pineda Mercado; May 15, 1987 (age 39); Parañaque, Metro Manila, Philippines
- Occupations: Actress; singer
- Years active: 1998–present
- Spouse: Dennis Trillo (m. 2021)
- Children: 2
- Awards: Full list
- Musical career
- Genres: Pop; OPM
- Instrument: Vocal
- Years active: 2004–present
- Labels: GMA; Viva Records; Ivory Music; Star Music

Jennylyn Anne Pineda Mercado-Ho (born May 15, 1987) is a Filipino actress and singer. She is known for playing dramatic roles in film and television. She rose to prominence after winning the reality talent competition StarStruck in 2003. Mercado garnered acclaim at a young age for her acting performances on television and film. She has since starred in multiple commercially successful films, including English Only, Please (2014), The Prenup (2015), Walang Forever (2015), and Just the 3 of Us (2016). With GMA Records and Viva Records, Mercado has released three albums, which have several popular singles such as "Sa Aking Panaginip", "Moments of Love" in collaboration with Janno Gibbs, "Basta't Nandito Ka", and "Kahit Sandali". In 2017, Mercado starred in the Philippine remake of My Love from the Star.

Mercado's prominence in Philippine cinema earned her the nickname "Asia's Ultimate Star".

== Early life and family ==
Jennylyn Anne Pineda Mercado was born on May 15, 1987, in Parañaque, Metro Manila. As a child, Mercado suffered physical abuse from her stepfather. Her biological mother, Jinkee Pineda returned from Dubai merely to bail her stepfather out. Henceforth, Mercado was raised by her late aunt, Lydia Mercado, whom she fondly called “Mommy Lydia” who died in 2016 and whom she considers as her adoptive mother.

== Career ==
=== 1999–2000: Early years ===
Mercado started as a recording artist with Alpha Records in 1999 through the recommendation of her voice coach, Susanna Pichay. Mercado was in Nonoy Tan's singing group, G4. The group recorded two songs but never released an album due to two of the four members dropping out. After G4, Mercado went into commercial modeling, landing a stint with Bambini cologne and a Pond's TV advertisement. She was also part of the Elite Circle of "10 Modeling Search", where she competed with StarStruck co-finalist, Dion Ignacio.

In 2002, Mercado made her debut acting appearance playing a minor role in ABS-CBN's TV series Kay Tagal Kang Hinintay, which was top-billed by Bea Alonzo and John Lloyd Cruz.

=== 2003–2009: Television dramas and music releases ===
In 2003, Mercado joined the reality show StarStruck. She and Mark Herras won, receiving 1,000,000 pesos and exclusive contracts from GMA Network. After winning StarStruck, Mercado and Herras were launched as a love team in Forever in My Heart, and months earlier they were in the last batch of the teen series Click. She later starred in numerous TV series, including Encantadia, I Luv NY, Dangal, Super Twins, Paano Ba Ang Mangarap?, SRO Cinemaserye: Suspetsa, Ikaw Sana, and Gumapang Ka Sa Lusak. She also acted in films such as So Happy Together (2004) and teen-flick Let the Love Begin (2005).

Mercado released her first album Living the Dream, which contained original compositions by Vehnee Saturno, and a carrier single titled "Kahit Sandali". In May 2006, Mercado released her second album Letting Go, which included the single "Sa Aking Panaginip" by Vehnee Saturno. Mercado's first major concert was held at the Music Museum in Greenhills on May 15, 2006. In May 2009, she held a sold-out birthday concert titled "I Am Woman" at the Music Museum. In January 2010, under Viva Records, she released her third album, Love Is... Jennylyn Mercado.

=== 2010–2015: Entry into film and first MMFF Best Actress award ===
Mercado starred in Filipino period piece Rosario (2010). Her acting career was handled by Becky Aguila and Viva Entertainment, where she joined her Starstruck co-alumnus Cristine Reyes. Mercado's singing career was managed by Viva Records. In 2011, her contract with Viva ended and was not renewed, though she joined Cristine Reyes. In 2012, Mercado signed with PolyEast Records to reinvent herself as singer. She also signed an acting contract with Regal Entertainment in the same year.

Mercado branched out into television hosting, hosting reality series Protégé: The Battle for the Big Break with co-hosts Ogie Alcasid and Dingdong Dantes. She was also in the GMA-7 Sunday talk show, Showbiz Central.

In 2013, Mercado acted in the romance The Bride and the Lover (2013). Her contract with Polyeast Records ended that year. In 2014, she played the role of a woman with a split personality through Rhodora X. According to Mercado, this was the most challenging role she has ever played. In late 2014, she released her fifth album through GMA Records.

At the end of 2014, Mercado starred in English Only, Please, a role that was originally offered to singer-actress Angeline Quinto. In the film, Mercado played the role of Tere Madlansacay, a Filipino tutor. Critics deemed it a "sleeper hit", and it was chosen as one of the eight official films for the 2014 Metro Manila Film Festival (MMFF). In early 2015, Mercado received the MMFF Best Actress Award for her role in English Only, Please.

=== 2016–present: Just the 3 of Us and second MMFF Best Actress award ===
In 2015, Mercado was first in the FHM "Philippines' 100 Sexiest Women" list after Marian Rivera vacated the title. Before Mercado traveled to New York for the film PreNup with actor Sam Milby, she was surprised and given a plaque by publisher Aeus Reyes, Allan Altera, and GMA News reporter Nelson Canlas. On July 11, Mercado participated in the two-part FHM 100 Sexiest party at the SMX Convention Center in the SM Mall of Asia.

Mercado played the lead role of Melanie "Mel" Fernandez-Dela Paz in the GMA series My Faithful Husband, which aired on August 10, 2015. Despite its success, the series was not extended due to scheduling conflicts with Mercado, who at the time was acting in two films, The Prenup and WalangForever. The series earned the lead actors multiple acting awards and nominations. After the commercial success of WalangForever, Mercado earned her second consecutive MMFF Best Actress award in 2015.

Through social media, Mercado announced her upcoming project, confirming that she was acting in a new film with actor John Lloyd Cruz. The film, titled Just the 3 of Us, was produced by Star Cinema. It earned 16 million pesos in its opening day, which was the highest opening day gross of any of Mercado's movies and set a record for the highest opening day gross for a Philippine film. It went on to be one of the highest-grossing Philippine films of 2016.

After months of negotiations, Mercado and GMA renewed their contract on July 4, 2016. As part of the contract, Mercado hosted GMA's new comedy-singing show Superstar Duets. She was later chosen to play the role of Steffi for the Philippine remake of the South Korean series My Love from the Star.

In October 2018, Mercado became the first Filipina brand ambassador for international makeup brand Max Factor.

Mercado's contract with GMA Network expired in September 2024. Several media reports stated that Love. Die. Repeat., directed by Irene Villamor, would be her last project with GMA, alongside newly-signed GMA actor Xian Lim, though she re-signed with GMA on January 20, 2025.

It was announced that Mercado would star in an action television series titled Sanggang Dikit, and in a movie project entitled Anything About Your Wife with Dennis Trillo and Sam Milby. Mercado and her Aguila management also announced that she was working on a comeback album.

== Other ventures ==
=== Advocacies ===
Mercado has spoken often on the matter of women's rights, particularly violence against women. She has been recognized by GABRIELA, a Philippine women's organization, which has made her an honorary member.

=== Athletics ===
Mercado is also an aspiring triathlete. In her free time, she takes jujitsu and Muay Thai lessons. "They built up my muscles. I looked heavy onscreen," Mercado recounted. "I realized that I needed cardio exercises to slim down." She discovered running and biking, which soon led her to join duathlon competitions in Alabang and Laguna. She is also a diver and wishes to inspire people to be environment friendly.

Mercado is a practitioner of Tabimina Balintawak, a close-range variant of Balintawak Arnis created Grandmaster Bobby Tabimina, who in turn developed its principles after studying the Balintawak system developed by Grandmaster Venancio Bacon in the 1950s.

=== Business ===
In 2014, Mercado launched her first business, Fit and Form, a wellness center but when her business partner opted out, she and Trillo, her husband rebranded and named it after their daughter, DYLAN Style Lounge, a salon and nail spa business located in Baranggay U.P Campus, Quezon, City. The couple also opened a cat cafe called Litterbucks in 2020.

She serves as President and co-founder of the production company, Brightburn Production owned by his husband, Dennis Trillo which was founded in 2024.

== Personal life ==
In 2008, at age 21, Mercado announced that she was pregnant. Her ex-boyfriend Patrick Garcia, who distanced himself upon learning of her pregnancy, was announced as the father of her child. On August 16, 2008, she gave birth to their son, Alex Jazz, via Caesarian section.

In 2021, she married her longtime boyfriend Dennis Trillo. Their daughter, Dylan Jayde, was born on April 25, 2022.

Mercado and Trillo own a rest house made of shipping containers in Tanay, Rizal.

== Filmography ==
=== Selected filmography ===
Film

- So... Happy Together (2004)
- Let the Love Begin (2005)
- Lovestruck (2005)
- Say That You Love Me (2006)
- Blue Moon (2006)
- Super Noypi (2006)
- Eternity (2006)
- Tiyanaks (2007)
- Resiklo (2007)
- Nars (2007)
- Half-blood Samurai (2008)
- Rosario (2010)
- Moron 5 and the Crying Lady (2012)
- The Bride and the Lover (2013)
- English Only, Please (2015)
- The Prenup (2015)
- WalangForever (2015)
- Just the 3 of Us (2016)
- All Of You (2017)
- 3pol Trobol: Huli Ka Balbon! (2019)
- Everything About My Wife (2025)

Television

- Joyride (2005)
- Encantadia (2005)
- Encantadia: Pag-ibig Hanggang Wakas (2006)
- I Luv NY (2006)
- Super Twins (2007)
- La Vendetta (2007–2008)
- Ikaw Sana (2009–2010)
- Little Star (2010–2011)
- Jillian: Namamasko Po (2010–2011)
- Futbolilits (2011)
- Makapiling Kang Muli (2012)
- Hindi Ka na Mag-iisa (2012)
- Indio (2013)
- Rhodora X (2014)
- Second Chances (2015)
- My Faithful Husband (2015)
- My Love from the Star (2017)
- Descendants of the Sun (2020)
- Love. Die. Repeat. (2024)
- Sanggang-Dikit FR (2025–2026)

== Discography ==
Studio albums

- Living the Dream (2004)
- Letting Go (2007)
- Love Is... (2010)
- Never Alone (2014)
- Ultimate (2016)

Compilation albums

- Kahit Sandali: The Best of Jennylyn Mercado (2008)
- GMA Collection Series: Jennylyn Mercado (2014)

Extended play

- Forever By Your Side (2012)
- Jennylyn Mercado – Ultimate (2016)
- JEN (2025)

Singles

- "Kahit Sandali" (2004)
- "Sa Aking Panaginip" (2005)
- "It's Christmas All Over The World" (2005)
- "Moments of Love" with Janno Gibbs (2006)
- "Kaya Mo Bang Ibalik" Kahit Sandali 2008)
- "Sometimes Love Just Aint Enough" (2010)
- "Hindi Ka Na Mag-iisa" (2012)
- "Basta't Nandito Ka" (2014)
- "Hagdan" (2016)
- "Ayaw Pa rin Umuwi" (2025)
- "Hindi Pa Rin Sapat" (2025)

== Concert ==
- "I am Woman" (2009)
- "Sikat ka Kapuso" in USA (2018)
- "Sikat ka Kapuso" in Canada (2018)
- "Co-Love Live" with Dennis Trillo (2020)

== Awards ==
Mercado has received various awards and nominations throughout her acting career. Her accolades include three Metro Manila Film Festival Awards, four Box Office Entertainment Awards, two Edukcircle Awards, one FAMAS Award, one PMPC Star Awards for Television, one Gawad Tanglaw Award and several nominations from Gawad Urian Award, Luna Awards and PMPC Star Awards for Movies. As television host, she won Best Reality Talent Show Host for Starstruck at EdukCircle Awards and received nominations from ENPRESS Golden Screen TV Awards and PMPC Star Awards for Television. In music, Mercado won two Awit Awards with several nominations from PMPC Star Awards for Music.

Preceded by Ryza Cenon	FHM Cover Girl (June 2013)	Succeeded by Alodia Gosiengfiao
Preceded by Marian Rivera	FHM Philippines; Sexiest Woman of the Year (2015)	Succeeded by Jessy Mendiola

Awards and achievements
Preceded by New	StarStruck; 2003 (season 1)	Succeeded by Ryza Cenon
