= Jimrex Jaca =

Filipino boxer (born 1983)

Personal information
- Nickname: Executioner
- Nationality: Filipino
- Born: Jemuel Buena Divino; June 16, 1983 (age 43) Dumaguete, Negros Oriental, Philippines
- Height: 1.70 m (5 ft 7 in)
- Weight: Bantamweight; Super bantamweight; Featherweight; Super featherweight; Lightweight; Light welterweight; Welterweight; Super welterweight

Boxing career
- Stance: Southpaw

Boxing record
- Total fights: 52
- Wins: 40
- Win by KO: 22
- Losses: 8
- Draws: 4

Jemuel Buena Divino (born 16 June 1983), more known as Jimrex Jaca is a Filipino professional boxer who held the Oriental and Pacific Boxing Federation (OPBF) super bantamweight title. He also challenged for the WBO interim featherweight title once.

== Professional career ==
=== Early career ===
==== Jaca vs. Pacquiao ====
On 10 August 2001, Jaca, aged 17 fought Manny Pacquiao's infamous brother Bobby Pacquiao in Cebu City, Jaca managed to knock Pacquiao out in 1 round.

==== GAB Filipino bantamweight champion ====
On 21 October 2001, Jaca fought 10–3–1 Alfren Bulala for the vacant GAB Filipino bantamweight title, Jaca won the title via unanimous decision. Jaca would vacate the title immediately and move back up to the super bantamweight division to fight journeyman Andy Alagenio on 8 February 2002 and prevail via second-round TKO.

==== GAB Filipino super bantamweight champion ====
On 26 July 2002, Jaca challenged the reigning and defending GAB Filipino super bantamweight champion Dino Olivetti in Cebu City, Jaca dethroned Olivetti via second-round KO.

Jaca defended his Filipino crown against former PABA bantamweight champion Joel Junio on 15 November 2002 in Surigao City and won via UD, afterward he defended his title once more against Pederito Laurente on 15 March 2003, in which, he won via UD again.

=== OPBF super bantamweight champion ===
==== Jaca vs. Laurente II ====
On 30 January 2004, Jaca rematched his former for Pederito Laurente who suddenly won the OPBF super bantamweight championship, their match took place at the Waterfront Cebu City Hotel & Casino in Cebu City, Jaca was able to defeat Laurente again via UD with the wide-margin scores of 117–110, 119–109 and 116–111, he also scored a knockdown in the fourth round.

==== Jaca vs. Kunimi ====
On 30 May 2004, Jaca was set to make his first OPBF title defense against Yasuo Kunimi, however he would be stripped the day before due to missing weight, weighing 3 and a half pounds over the super bantamweight limit, thus, the title was only at stake for Kunimi. Kunimi would beat him via a seventh-round KO.

=== Super featherweight ===
==== Jaca vs. Hernandez ====
After beating season veteran compatriot Samuel Duran to win the GAB super featherweight title on 25 Nov 2005, on 21 January 2006, Jaca faced Mexican journeyman Geronimo Hernandez on the Erik Morales vs. Manny Pacquiao II undercard in Las Vegas, Nevada, this marked Jaca's debut in the United States. Jaca scored an impressive first-round stoppage.

==== OPBF ratings issue and OPBF super featherweight title challenge vs. Honmo ====
In March 2006, Jaca, who was previously unranked by the OPBF in the super featherweight division, was suddenly elevated to no. 1 in the ratings, despite his bouts in the super featherweight division being not that credible enough yet, with some even arguing that his wins over Samuel Duran and Geronimo Hernandez were not that great, stating that Duran was a "washed" 100-bouts veteran and Hernandez' can be considered as a "bum." Furthermore, Jaca's compatriot Czar Amonsot who was no. 3 last December 2005 ratings was suddenly dropped from the rankings, marking questions in the OPBF super featherweight ratings.

Due to Jaca being the no. 1 contender now, he was mandated to fight for the vacant OPBF super featherweight strap against Nobuhito Honmo on 20 May 2006 in Tokyo. Jaca would however lose to the Japanese boxer via unanimous decision. (114–117, 113–116 and 112–116)

==== Mano-A-Mano ====
After his loss against Honmo, Jaca would be scheduled to face against Mexican Hector Javier Marquez in the historic Mano-A-Mano event between Manny Pacquiao and Óscar Larios on 25 August 2007 at the Araneta Coliseum. Jaca would win via seventh-round unanimous technical decision after Jaca's cut, which he received in the third round worsened and Jaca was unfit to continue.

=== Featherweight ===
==== Jaca vs. Márquez ====
In late 2006, it was announced that Jaca was scheduled against former world champion and reigning WBO interim featherweight champion Juan Manuel Márquez for the title scheduled for 26 October 2006 under the Golden Boy Promotions. However it would be "cancelled" due to Jaca's visa issues, upon learning that news, Jaca's long-time manager and stable leader Rex "Wakee" Salud reached out to Top Rank to include Jaca in the Manny Pacquiao vs. Erik Morales III undercard, in which, the promotion would remove one scheduled bout just to accommodate for Jaca's match. Unfortunately for Salud, he got a call that the Jaca-Márquez bout would be pushed through 25 November 2006 schedule under the Golden Boys Promotions, to Salud's dismay as he was informed that the bout was cancelled not postponed, Salud had already committed the match under the Pacquiao-Morales III card on November 18. Salud would inform Jimrex Jaca and his trainer on November 2 to inform them about the commotions and to prepare to head on November 4 to train at the Wild Card Gym, Jaca would ask to go home to Sibulan. Unbeknownst to Salud, Jaca would suddenly flown towards the U.S. on November 2, to add things up, Oscar De La Hoya would receive information that Jaca is indeed training already in the Golden Boy Gym, against Salud's plans. Furthermore, Salud's manager contract with Jaca was supposed to last until 2009, however, Jaca went against his permissions, Salud who has been always at Jaca's side since he turned pro at 17 years old admitted that he felt cheated and insisted that Jaca's action was an act of treason.

Setting his problems aside, Jaca would be scheduled to a WBO interim championship against Márquez as initially planned, now on 25 November 2025 at the Dodge Arena in Hidalgo, Texas. Márquez' trainer-manager Ignacio "Nacho" Beristáin would admit that Márquez may be fighting a "first-class" opponent after observing Jaca's previous bouts, including the Mano-A-Mano match, Beristáin would state that the younger, taller and perhaps faster Jaca may be a formidable one and ultimately gained his respect. In the fight, Jaca would give a respectable and credible performance against the much more experienced and better foe, the two fighters of opposing stance gave an enjoyable back-and-forth match with Márquez nealry being dropped by Jaca from a counrr in the second round and receiving a cut that streamed blood down in Márquez' right side of his face. Ultimately, Márquez would be performing better and getting the best of exchanges en route to an incredible ninth-round knockout. In January 2007, it was reported that infamous referee Laurence Cole, who is notoriously known for his rather questionable refereeing in high-class level bouts was fined and temporarily suspended after he was reported telling the bloodied Márquez (from a clash of heads) that he was winning on the scorecards and he insisted that Márquez should avoid retiring in the corner. Previously in the eighth round, Cole brought Márquez to the ringside medics in which the medics said that he was still fit. Conclusively, Cole was fined $500 and suspended from January 1 to July 1, in which he gave reasons to why he did that and apologized.

=== Return to super featherweight ===
==== WBO Asia Pacific super featherweight champion ====
On 24 February 2007, Jaca would return to the Philippines to fight reining WBO Asia Pacific super featherweight champion Simson Butar Butar whom defeated Czar Amonsot for the title. Jaca would be victorious and reign as new WBO Asia Pacific champion via seventh-round knockout.

==== Jaca vs. Miyagi I and II ====
On 25 August 2007, Jaca defended his WBO Asia Pacific crown against slugger and power puncher Ryuta Miyagi at the SM Mall of Asia IMAX theater in Pasay. In the first round, Jaca would be dropped twice by Miyagi, showing the lack of defence but he would be able to get back on his feet and knock Miyagi down too once in the first round. The bout would end in the second round as it was stopped on cuts and ruled as a technical decision, by boxing rules, a technical decision before completing four rounds would be immediately ruled as a technical draw. They would have their second meeting in the same venue on 14 November 2007, billed as the "Battle of Manila II" in which, it would again abruptly end raw as the bout finished even faster, lasting only two minutes and thirty-six seconds before being ruled a technical decision due to a deep cut on Miyagi's forehead caused by a clash of heads. Prior to their second meeting, Jaca would be seemingly stripped or vacated of the WBO Asia Pacific title as he was unable to defend the title against Miyagi the second time.

=== Lightweight ===
==== Gatekeeper role ====
On 15 March 2008, Jaca made his lightweight division debut against former world-title challenger 32–3–2, 15KOs Kengo Nagashima in a ten-rounder bout in Tokyo. Jaca would be able to drop Nagashima in the second round but he would lose via unanimous decision. On 27 June 2008, Jaca faced former WBA super featherweight champion Yodsanan Sor Nanthachai in Pattaya, Thailand, Jaca lost via sixth-round TKO, solidifying his gatekeeper role against higher-level oppositions. On 22 October 2008, Jaca, who was reported pretty out of shaped, challenged Saddam Kietyongyuth for the WBC Asia lightweight title in Nonthaburi. Jaca would receive his third loss in a row as he was stopped in the second round.

=== Super lightweight ===
==== Return ====
On 23 January 2010, after a long hiatus, Jaca returned to face 13–2–1 Indonesian Ramadhan Weriuw in Pasay, Jaca would return to the winning column as he knocked Weriuw out in the fifth round.

==== WBO Oriental super lightweight champion ====
After facing decent to above decent oppositions in the Philippines, Jaca would compose a new record of 37–6–3, 21KOs before fighting former WBC FECARBOX champion and Mexican contender José Emilio Perea for the vacant WBO Oriental super lightweight championship in Cebu City on 25 May 2013. Jaca's opponent Perea and his trainer notably made confident statements, arguing that Perea will defeat Jaca in a manner. Jaca would beat Perea via unanimous decision with the scores of 116–110 and 115–112 (x2), Jaca was deducted a point for an intentional headbutt in round 9 and was dropped once in the final round. After the event, ALA Promotions, Jaca's stable complained that Perea have used epinephrine, an adrenaline-boosting drug at his corner, as shown in a video tape used by ALA Promotions to prove the allegations.

==== Jaca vs. Iwabuchi ====
On 28 February 2014, in his journey to continue his rise, Jaca faced Japanese contender Shinya Iwabuchi in Tokyo, Japan. Jaca dropped Iwabuchi once and was prevailing in points, however, in the seventh-round, he was hit by a hard punch and went groggy, prompting the referee to halt the bout. Ending Jaca's unbeaten streak since January 2010.

==== Retirement ====
On 16 March 2015, Jaca faced another Japanese contender Akihiro Kondo, Jaca once again dictated the pace and did more effort in the early rounds, however, he would be stopped in the fourth round. On 7 August 2015, Jaca would unexpectedly have his last bout against 21–5, 16KOs Pablo Lugo Montiel in a "Pinoy Pride" boxing event, scheduled at the World Trade Centre in Dubai, UAE. Jaca won via unanimous decision, he later mysteriously disappeared from the limelight and retired from boxing. In 2018, he explained that he retired to focus on his family.

== Professional boxing record ==
52 fights	40 wins	8 losses
By knockout	22	6
By decision	18	2
Draws	4	

No.	Result	Record	Opponent	Type	Round, time	Date	Location	Notes
52	Win	40–8–4	Pablo Lugo Montiel	UD	8	7 Aug 2015	World Trade Centre, Dubai, United Arab Emirates	
51	Loss	39–8–4	Akihiro Kondo	TKO	4 (8), 2:45	16 Mar 2015	Korakuen Hall, Tokyo, Japan	
50	Draw	39–7–4	Masayoshi Kotake	TD	3 (8), 1:15	21 Jun 2014	Cebu City Waterfront Hotel & Casino, Cebu City, Philippines	TD: Jaca cut from accidental headbutt
49	Loss	39–7–3	Shinya Iwabuchi	TKO	7 (8), 0:45	28 Feb 2014	Korakuen Hall, Tokyo, Japan	
48	Win	39–6–3	Wellem Reyk	KO	1 (6), 2:24	30 Nov 2013	Araneta Coliseum, Quezon City, Philippines	
47	Win	38–6–3	José Emilio Perea	UD	12	25 Mar 2013	Cebu City Waterfront Hotel & Casino, Cebu City, Philippines	Won vacant WBO Oriental light welterweight title
46	Win	37–6–3	Rachamongkol Sor Pleonchit	TKO	7 (10), 0:53	2 Mar 2013	Cebu City Waterfront Hotel & Casino, Cebu City, Philippines	
45	Win	36–6–3	Jaypee Ignacio	UD	10	17 Nov 2012	Lamberto Macias Sports Complex, Dumaguete, Philippines	
44	Win	35–6–3	Martín Ángel Martínez Pérez	KO	8 (10), 2:59	18 Aug 2012	Cebu City Waterfront Hotel & Casino, Cebu City, Philippines	
43	Win	34–6–3	Felipe Jun Demecillo	RTD	3 (10), 3:00	6 Aug 2011	Mandaue City Sports and Cultural Fomplex, Mandaue, Philippines	
42	Win	33–6–3	Arnel Donal	TKO	3 (10), 2:25	12 Mar 2011	Tabunoc Sports Complex, Talisay, Philippines	
41	Win	32–6–3	Han Hao	TKO	6 (10), 1:50	10 Oct 2010	Vitaliano Agan Stadium, Zamboanga City, Philippines	
40	Win	31–6–3	Gerardo Cuevas	KO	1 (10), 2:22	28 Aug 2010	Cebu City Waterfront Hotel & Casino, Cebu City, Philippines	
39	Win	30–6–3	James Kimori	TKO	4 (10), 1:13	23 May 2010	Cebu City Waterfront Hotel & Casino, Cebu City, Philippines	
38	Win	29–6–3	Ramadhan Weriuw	KO	5 (8), 2:58	23 Jan 2010	Cuneta Astrodome, Pasay, Philippines	
37	Loss	28–6–3	Saddam Kietyongyuth	TKO	2 (12), 2:41	22 Oct 2008	Sukhothai Thammathirat University, Pak Kret, Thailand	For WBC-ABCO lightweight title
36	Loss	28–5–3	Yodsanan Sor Nanthachai	TKO	6 (10), 1:36	27 Jun 2008	Pattaya, Chonburi Province, Thailand	
35	Loss	28–4–3	Kengo Nagashima	UD	10	15 Mar 2008	Korakuen Hall, Tokyo, Japan	
34	Draw	28–3–3	Ryuta Miyagi	TD	1 (10), 2:36	14 Nov 2007	IMAX Theatre at SM Mall of Asia, Pasay, Philippines	TD: Miyagi cut from accidental headbutt
33	Draw	28–3–2	Ryuta Miyagi	TD	2 (12), 2:17	25 Aug 2007	IMAX Theatre at SM Mall of Asia, Pasay, Philippines	Retained WBO Asia Pacific super featherweight title; TD: Stopped on cuts
32	Win	28–3–1	Simson Butar Butar	KO	7 (12), 2:02	24 Feb 2007	Cebu City Sports Complex, Cebu City, Philippines	Won WBO Asia Pacific super featherweight title
31	Loss	27–3–1	Juan Manuel Márquez	KO	9 (12), 2:48	25 Nov 2006	Dodge Arena, Hidalgo, Texas, U.S.	For WBO interim featherweight title
30	Win	27–2–1	Héctor Javier Márquez	TD	7 (10), 2:08	2 Jul 2006	Araneta Coliseum, Quezon City, Philippines	Unanimous TD: Jaca cut above the left eye from an accidental headbutt
29	Loss	26–2–1	Nobuhito Honmo	UD	12	20 May 2006	Korakuen Hall, Tokyo, Japan	For vacant OPBF super featherweight title
28	Win	26–1–1	Geronimo Hernández	TKO	1 (8), 2:43	21 Jan 2006	Thomas & Mack Center, Paradise, Nevada, U.S.	
27	Win	25–1–1	Samuel Duran	TKO	2 (12), 2:44	25 Nov 2005	Maasin City Sports Complex (Maasin City Gym), Maasin, Philippines	Won vacant Philippines GAB super featherweight title
26	Win	24–1–1	Renato Maghuyop	TKO	2 (10)	30 Jul 2005	Barili Sports Complex, Barili, Philippines	
25	Draw	23–1–1	Kinji Amano	MD	10	24 May 2005	Korakuen Hall, Tokyo, Japan	
24	Win	23–1	Isamu Sakashita	TD	5 (10), 1:56	17 Oct 2004	Sangyo Hall, Kanazawa, Japan	Majority TD
23	Loss	22–1	Yasuo Kunimi	KO	7 (12), 1:50	30 May 2004	Sangyo Hall, Kanazawa, Japan	OPBF super bantamweight title only at stake for Kunimi as Jaca missed weight
22	Win	22–0	Pederito Laurente	UD	12	30 Jan 2004	Cebu City Waterfront Hotel & Casino, Cebu City, Philippines	Won OPBF super bantamweight title
21	Win	21–0	Jaime Acerda	UD	10	13 Nov 2003	Sibulan Auditorium, Sibulan, Philippines	
20	Win	20–0	Jaime Barcelona	UD	10	19 Jul 2003	Mandaue City Sports and Cultural Complex, Mandaue, Philippines	
19	Win	19–0	Pederito Laurente	UD	12	15 Mar 2003	Lamberto Macias Sports Complex, Dumaguete, Philippines	Retained Philippines GAB super bantamweight title
18	Win	18–0	Joel Junio	UD	12	15 Nov 2002	Surigao City, Surigao del Norte, Philippines	Retained Philippines GAB super bantamweight title
17	Win	17–0	Vihok Jockygym	UD	8	26 Oct 2002	Rizal Memorial Colleges Gym, Davao City, Philippines	
16	Win	16–0	Dino Olivetti	TKO	2 (12), 1:56	26 Jul 2002	Cebu City Waterfront Hotel & Casino, Cebu City, Philippines	Won Philippines GAB super bantamweight title
15	Win	15–0	Michael Domingo	UD	10	27 Apr 2002	Cebu City Waterfront Hotel & Casino, Cebu City, Philippines	
14	Win	14–0	Andy Alegenio	TKO	2 (10)	8 Feb 2002	Cebu City Waterfront Hotel & Casino, Cebu City, Philippines	
13	Win	13–0	Alfren Bulala	UD	12	20 Dec 2001	Cebu City Waterfront Hotel & Casino, Cebu City, Philippines	Won vacant Philippines GAB bantamweight title
12	Win	12–0	Bobby Pacquiao	KO	1 (10)	10 Aug 2001	Barangay Lahug, Cebu City, Philippines	
11	Win	11–0	Ronnie Longakit	UD	10	26 Jun 2001	Lapu-Lapu City, Cebu, Philippines	
10	Win	10–0	Ramil Austria	KO	3 (10)	10 Mar 2001	Negros Oriental, Philippines	
9	Win	9–0	Pedro Malco	KO	5 (8), 2:59	26 Jan 2001	Cebu City Waterfront Hotel & Casino, Cebu City, Philippines	
8	Win	8–0	Bobby Rabanos	KO	4 (8), 2:43	10 Dec 2000	Guadalupe Sports Center, Cebu City, Philippines	
7	Win	7–0	Alex Escaner	UD	6	20 Oct 2000	Carmona, Cavite, Philippines	
6	Win	6–0	Michael Domingo	KO	3 (6), 2:32	6 Oct 2000	Cainta, Rizal, Philippines	
5	Win	5–0	Dot Dot Forca	UD	6	30 Sep 2000	New Cebu Coliseum, Cebu City, Philippines	
4	Win	4–0	Rene Andico	TKO	1 (4)	18 Aug 2000	Marikina, Metro Manila, Philippines	
3	Win	3–0	Roel Mangan	PTS	6	7 Jul 2000	Philippines	
2	Win	2–0	John Peter Caliente	UD	4	16 Jun 2000	Quezon City, Metro Manila, Philippines	
1	Win	1–0	Marniel Masecampo	TKO	2 (4)	4 Jun 2000	Labangon Sports Complex, Cebu City, Philippines	

== Ring name ==
Jimrex Jaca, whose real name is Jemuel Divino was given the ring name "Jimrex Jaca" by his long-time manager Rex "Wakee" Salud, where Salud would fuse the Jem (to Jim) from Jemuel with Rex to complete the Jimrex first name, and Jaca to honour his trainer Anol Jaca, serving as Divino's ring last name.

== Personal life ==
Jemuel Divino had a late wife named Brendalyn who was diagnosed with diabetes, and a has daughter born around 2004. After 7 August 2015, his last bout, Divino seemingly disappeared from the public. But in April 2018, SunStar Davao would rediscover Divino as a traffic enforcer around Talisay, Cebu, he admitted that he enjoyed being a traffic enforcer. Before so, he worked as a contractual driver for the government of San Fernando, Cebu. He later stated that he retired from boxing so he could take care of his family, mostly his ill wife who was then suffering from diabetes.

He was once depicted in a Magpakailanman episode titled "Suntok sa Buwan na Pangarap", where Polo Ravales depicted him, it was written by Dode Cruz and directed by Argel Joseph, and it was released it 30 March 2006. It followed his story of being keen to follow his dreams to become a popular boxer at an early age, despite his mother's conerns.
