= List of Magpakailanman episodes (2002–2007) =

Philippine weekly drama anthology broadcast by GMA Network

Magpakailanman (English: Forevermore) is a Philippine television drama anthology broadcast weekly by the GMA Network. The show is hosted by 24 Oras anchor and GMA Kapuso Foundation founder Mel Tiangco and features inspiring stories and life experiences from both famous and ordinary people. It was aired every Monday until early 2003 and was moved to Thursday from April 3, 2003 on the network's primetime block.

The following are the lists of Magpakailanman episodes listed by the year they were aired, in the first incarnation that was aired from December 2, 2002, to December 27, 2007.

== Series overview ==
- List of Magpakailanman episodes (2002–2007)#Episodes
- List of Magpakailanman episodes (2012–2019)#Episodes
- List of Magpakailanman episodes (2020–present)#Episodes

== Episode list ==
=== 2002 ===
No. in season	Title	Cast	Directed by	Written by	Original release date
1	"Minsan, May Isang Bituin" (The Didith Reyes Story)	Ara Mina	Argel Joseph	Don Michael Perez	December 2, 2002
Maria Helen Bella Avenila Santamaria, famously known as Didith Reyes, was one of the most popular balladeers in the Philippines during the 1970s. She was considered a breakthrough artist because of her Tagalog hits that outshined most of her contemporaries. Because of her immense popularity, she was forced to do intimate and sexy music scenarios that will further boost her marketability to the public. However, her career began to stumble when certain family and job issues affected her physical and mental health. Supporting cast: Raymond Bagatsing, AJ Eigenmann, Geoff Eigenmann, Jan Marini, Dindin Llarena, Hans Montenegro, Lala Montelibano, Jenine Desiderio, German Moreno
2	"Abot Tanaw ang Bukas" (The Wayda Cosme Story)	Jolina Magdangal	Argel Joseph	Don Michael Perez	December 9, 2002
Wayda Cosme is Philippine history's first Aeta attorney. Cosme passed the 2001 bar exam to become the first Aeta lawyer in Philippine history at the age of 26. But like in other success stories, Wayda had to overcome obstacles that seemed insurmountable to succeed. Supporting cast: Julio Diaz, Vivian Foz, James Blanco, Chynna Ortaleza, Tony Mabesa, Crispin Pineda, Connie Chua
3	"Ano ang Kulay ng Pag-asa?" (The Mark Acosta Story)	Cogie Domingo	Argel Joseph	Leah Eriguel	December 16, 2002
Supporting cast: Alice Dixson, Jaclyn Jose, Bembol Roco, Eagle Riggs, Gerald Madrid, Ardie Aquino, Jiego Malvar
4	"Sa Muling Pagsikat ng Araw" (The Maritoni Fernandez Story)	Chin-Chin Gutierrez	Argel Joseph	Dode Cruz	December 30, 2002
Maritoni Fernandez is a well known beauty in the film industry, but her life turns bad when she finds out that she has cancer. Supporting cast: Nonie Buencamino, Pinky Amador, Allan Paule, Isabella de Leon, Pocholo Montes, Menggie Cubarrubias, Jay Espano, Pinky de Leon

=== 2003 ===
No. in season	Title	Cast	Directed by	Written by	Original release date
1	"Kapit-Kamay Hanggang Wakas" (The Gonzales Couple Story)	Gina Alajar; Tirso Cruz III	Argel Joseph	Abet Raz; Jessel Duque	January 6, 2003
This is the story of a strong couple who bravely face all of life's challenges, especially after Amelia falls ill and must be admitted to a mental institution. Supporting Cast: Rio Locsin, Perla Bautista
2	"Dahil Laging Sisikat ang Araw" (The Ricky Reyes Story)	Janno Gibbs	Argel Joseph	Don Michael Perez	January 13, 2003
The story follows the difficulties in the life of the most well-known hairdresser, Mother Ricky Supporting Cast: Gina Pareño, Pen Medina, John Apacible, Gerard Pizarras, Issa Avelino, Tricia Roman, JM de Guzman, Mark Malana, Gian Bernabe
3	"Walang Hanggang Pag-asa" (The Nicanor Aranas Story)	Eddie Garcia	Argel Joseph	Dode Cruz	January 20, 2003
Nicanor feels that education and dreams are as essential as fulfilling your duties as a father to your children. Despite his age, he is eager to start learning again. Supporting Cast: Elizabeth Oropesa, Gabby Eigenmann, Roxanne Barcelo, Lester Llansang
4	"Kapag Puso ang Timbangan" (The Superintendent Joy-Sim Cabal Story)	Gelli de Belen	Argel Joseph	Leah Eriguel	January 27, 2003
Joy, a woman who instead of conforming to social expectations, chooses to serve people. Joy aspires to show that being a woman especially a policewoman does not hinder her from achieving her goals. Supporting Cast: Ariel Rivera, Kier Legaspi, Roy Alvarez, Gigi Locsin, Mara Schnittka, Machiavelli Aquino
5	"May Liwanag sa Dilim" (The Josephre "Tata" Tajada Story)	Raymond Bagatsing	Argel Joseph	Abet Raz	February 3, 2003
Tata got convicted after false accusations were made against him and lost his wife and everything he had. Supporting Cast: Ina Raymundo, Lara Fabregas, Tanya Gomez, Archie Adamos, Antonio Aquitania, Mon Confiado, Alvin Bernales, Arjay Legaspi
6	"Minsan May Isang Pangako" (The Wawel & Mila Mercado Story)	Tonton Gutierrez; Glydel Mercado	Argel Joseph	Abet Raz	February 10, 2003
Wawel and Mila have a unique love story as they journey through happiness and grief together. Supporting Cast: Eddie Gutierrez, Pilar Pilapil, Kristine Mangle, Lollie Mara, Susan Lim, Nita Grandea
7	"Sa Bawat Pag-Ikot ng Mundo" (The Joey Marquez Story)	Jomari Yllana	Argel Joseph	Leah Eriguel	February 17, 2003
Before being a famous basketball player and a well-known actor, Joey Marquez was a determined and strong son who would do anything to earn his father's attention. Supporting Cast: Daria Ramirez, Dante Rivero, Melissa Mendez, Monina Bagatsing, Goyong, JJ Zamora, Aljon Valdinebro, Paulo Valconcha
8	"Bahaghari sa Dulo ng Unos" (The Marilou "Totsie" Lazo-Garcia Story)	Snooky Serna	Argel Joseph	Abet Raz	March 3, 2003
Totsie is punished by her father for being the cause of her mother's death, but what she didn't know is that she would also face death. Supporting Cast: Ricardo Cepeda, Jennifer Sevilla, Chinggoy Alonzo, Miko Sotto, BJ De Jesus, Roje Zamora, Brian Homocillo, Olga Natividad
9	"Nang Bumaba sa Lupa ang Bituin sa Langit" (The Nelia Sancho Story)	Miriam Quiambao	Argel Joseph	Leah Eriguel	March 10, 2003
A former beauty queen turned activist, Neila would stop at nothing to defend her life, her rights, and the general populace. Supporting Cast: Gary Estrada, Ana Capri, Vic Vargas, Mandy Ochoa, Racquel Villavicencio, Crispin Pineda
10	"Sa Muling Pagngiti ng Araw" (The Africa Jailani Sampedro Story)	Janice de Belen	Argel Joseph	Don Michael Perez	March 15, 2003
Africa is eager to finish school to support her children. Find out how she strives for her life and her family. Supporting Cast: Gary Estrada, Karen delos Reyes, Priscilla Almeda, Dexter Doria, Lui Manansala
11	"Sabay sa Indayog ng Tagumpay" (The Rochelle Pangilinan Story)	Rufa Mae Quinto	Argel Joseph	Abet Raz	March 17, 2003
This is the story of Rochelle Pangilinan, the front woman of the famous dance group Sexbomb, and how she hides her family problems from the spotlight. Her only wish is to have her father reunited with her family. Supporting Cast: Liza Lorena, Dick Israel, Joshua Zamora, Lyn Tamayo, Maricar Fernandez, Empress Schuck, Sonny Alcantara, Aira Bermudez, Mia Pangyarihan, Johlan Veluz, Cynthia Yapchingco, Mae Acosta
12	"Ang Pinakamagandang Bata sa Balat ng Lupa" (The Wilma Doesnt Story)	Alessandra De Rossi	Argel Joseph	Leah Eriguel	March 24, 2003
Wilma has been told since she was a youngster that she is not pretty, yet despite this, she proves herself to be the best by pursuing her dream of becoming a model. Supporting Cast: Gloria Diaz, Rez Cortez, Christian Vasquez, Apreal Tolentino, Jim Pebangco, Sean Ignacio, Issa Aguirre, Jessette Prospero
13	"Nang Minsang Magdamot ang Langit" (The Janet Clemente Story)	Dina Bonnevie	Argel Joseph	Don Michael Perez	April 3, 2003
Janet has endured several heartbreaks during her life and has come dangerously close to facing death because of a sin she did not commit. Discover how she managed to survive all of the difficulties she faced. Supporting Cast: Amy Austria, Mark Gil, Cherry Pie Picache, Monsour del Rosario, Alicia Alonzo, Armida Siguion-Reyna, Daniel Fernando, Maita Soriano, Dencio Padilla Jr.
14	"Pangako ng Kapatawaran" (The Vicky Belo Story)	Rosanna Roces	Argel Joseph	Dode Cruz	April 10, 2003
Vicky had a difficult childhood and was harassed by her peers for being overweight, which made her more interested in the beauty industry before she rose to fame as a dermatologist. Supporting Cast: Boots Anson-Roa, Pinky de Leon, Ramil Rodriguez, Carlos Morales, Shermaine Santiago, Mosang, Alloy Rolana, Athena Pia
15	"Suntok sa Pangarap na Bukas" (The Manny Pacquiao Story)	Mark Anthony Fernandez	Argel Joseph	Abet Raz	April 24, 2003
Manny was born into poverty, but it did not hinder him from achieving his dreams of becoming the greatest professional boxer of all time. Supporting Cast: Maui Taylor, Elizabeth Oropesa, Spanky Manikan, Michael Flores, Tom Olivar, Bobby Benitez, Dyan Delfin, Ivan Gonzales, JM Mendoza, Francis Ricafort, Lloyd Barredo
16	"Pasakalye ng Isang Pangarap" (The Love Añover Story)	Jolina Magdangal	Argel Joseph	Jun Lana	May 1, 2003
Coming from a poor family in Leyte, Love Añover grew up with her relatives in the province and became an all-around vendor at their marketplace. Her life changed when she received an opportunity to study in Manila since her mother worked as a bus conductor in the city. She was discriminated by her classmates because of her looks but this never stopped her from reaching her dreams—until she became an intern at GMA Network and eventually became an energetic production assistant in a TV show. Because of her hard work and determination, she soon became one of the iconic TV personalities in the longest-running morning news program on TV, Unang Hirit. Supporting Cast: Rio Locsin, John Arcilla, Boy2 Quizon, Dennis Trillo, Gigi Locsin, Charry Arespacochaga, Bien "Beauty" Cortez, Elena Bocalan, Arnold Clavio
17	"Karugtong ng Aking Buhay" (The Ara Mina Story)	Ara Mina	Argel Joseph	Dode Cruz	May 8, 2003
Watch the life story of Ara Mina and how she struggles to achieve her dream of being an actress. Supporting Cast: Tirso Cruz III, Daria Ramirez, Jean Saburit, Dennis Roldan, Flora Gasser, Chris Mathay, Bea Nicolas
TBA	"Gaano Katagal Maghilom ang Sugat?" (The Menchavez Family Story)	Jaclyn Jose	Argel Joseph	Dode Cruz	May 29, 2003
The Menchavez Family experiences leprosy. Find out in this episode how they overcome it. Supporting Cast: Julio Diaz, Chynna Ortaleza, L.A. Mumar, Vanna Garcia, Gilleth Sandico, Anne Villegas, Malou Crisologo
TBA	"Nang Mangarap ang Munting Prinsesa" (The Noemi "Mahal" Tesorero Story)	Mahal	Argel Joseph	Abet Raz	June 12, 2003
This is the story of ‘Mahal’ or Noemi Tesorero, a TV personality and comedian who was also well-known for her tumultuous love life. Supporting Cast: Chanda Romero, Al Tantay, Monina Bagatsing, CJ Ramos, Christine Mangle, Cyrus Valdez, Sherwin Ordonez, Malou de Guzman
TBA	"Pangarap na Bituin" (The Sarah Geronimo Story)	Kyla	Argel Joseph	Dode Cruz	June 19, 2003
Before emerging as the Popstar Princess and one of the most iconic artists of her generation in the Philippines, Sarah Geronimo experienced struggles which almost withered her hope. With the help of her father, she developed an exceptional singing prowess that shocked the music industry despite her young age. Later on, joining the reality singing competition Star For A Night became her stepping stone to reach her dreams and eventually hailed as its ultimate champion. Supporting Cast: Michael de Mesa, Teresa Loyzaga, Gladys Reyes, Anne Kristel Brila, Bob Molina, Minda Flores
TBA	"Nang Magtampo ang Kerubin" (The Elvira Lerum Story)	Susan Roces	Argel Joseph	Dode Cruz	June 26, 2003
Elvira Lerum is a widow who must leave her home and work as a domestic helper in order to support her three children. Maria, her youngest child, suffers from seizures. Maria leaves the house after being treated poorly by her older children, who see her as a burden. Supporting Cast: Maybelyn dela Cruz, Marita Zobel, Ramil Rodriguez, Charina Scott, Biboy Ramirez
TBA	"Minsan May Isang Doktor" (The Sen. Juan Flavier Story)	Ogie Alcasid	Argel Joseph	Abet Raz	July 3, 2003
The episode followed the life of former senator Juan Flavier, a country boy who decides to study medicine in order to aid his impoverished townmates who still follow shamans. The young doctor found it to be a challenging and upsetting experience, as the people he wants to help laugh at him and his motives. But he eventually succeeded in winning the public's approval, and he began working for the government. Supporting Cast: Gina Pareño, Suzette Ranillo, Iza Calzado, Steve Claude Goyong, Joe Gruta, Ihman Esturco, Olga Natividad, Gigette Reyes
TBA	"Dahil Katumbas ay Iyong Ngiti" (The Allan K. Story)	Allan K.	Argel Joseph	Leah Eriguel	July 10, 2003
This episode tells the story of Allan K, the now-comedian, and how he utilizes his challenges as motivation to achieve greater success. Supporting Cast: Gloria Sevilla, Manilyn Reynes, Arnel Ignacio, Noel Trinidad, Teri Aunor
TBA	"Tagumpay sa Bawat Patak ng Luha" (The Aegis Story)	Rochelle Pangilinan	Argel Joseph	Leah Eriguel	July 17, 2003
The story revolves around overcoming struggles and how the Filipino band Aegis succeeds in their craft as musicians. Supporting Cast: Jopay Paguia, Bobby Andrews, Maureen Larrazabal, Tommy Abuel, Lucita Soriano, Archie Adamos, Girlie Alcantara, Marcus Madrigal
TBA	"Nang Muling Magliwanag ang Bukas" (The Aurelia Abrasaldo Story)	Joyce Jimenez	Argel Joseph	Leah Eriguel	July 24, 2003
This is the story of Aurelia, who got abused and forced to marry her abuser. Supporting Cast: Victor Neri, Eva Darren, Glenda Garcia, Sean Ignacio, John Romano, Val Trono
TBA	"Nang Mang-abot ang Langit at Lupa" (The Annabelle Rama and Eddie Gutierrez Story)	Anne Curtis; Richard Gutierrez	Argel Joseph	Dode Cruz	July 31, 2003
Although the public knew that their relationship began as a fan-idol one, Annabelle claims to be a tremendous admirer of the Eddie-Susan love duo, especially the lead actor Eddie. Discover how they overcome their differences to fall in love. Supporting Cast: Mark Gil, Dylan Delfin, JC de Vera, Maita Soriano, Teresa
TBA	"Silang Inihabilin ng Langit" (The Sister Monica Sison Story)	Nora Aunor	Argel Joseph	Abet Ra; Jessel Duque	August 7, 2003
Sister Monica is a woman of privilege who gave up her luxurious lifestyle to aid the majority of people who are in need and provide them with the education they are entitled to. Supporting Cast: Sunshine Dizon, Michael Roy, Amy Robles, Shyr Valdes, Neil Ryan Sese, Mario Magallona, Ruby Ruiz
TBA	"Sa Muling Pag-ikot ng Mundo" (The Lala Montelibano Story)	Angelu de Leon	Argel Joseph	Abet Raz	August 14, 2003
Lala had wanted a family of her own ever since her mother abandoned her, and the folks who adopted her used her as a housekeeper. Dreaming of success, she entered the world of show business and rose to become one of the most well-known stars of her day. Supporting Cast: Mark Anthony Fernandez, Carmi Martin, Miko Sotto, Anna Marin, Jim Pebangco, Irma Adlawan
TBA	"Aabutin Ko ang Bituin sa Langit" (The Selina Sevilla Story)	Maureen Larrazabal	Argel Joseph	Leah Eriguel; Dode Cruz	August 21, 2003
Selina travels abroad to care for her sick sibling and impoverished family. Supporting Cast: Gardo Versoza, Carlos Morales, Angel Locsin, Christine Jaka, Belinda Bright, Renee Salud, Pilar Pilapil
TBA	(The Efren "Bata" Reyes Story)	Anjo Yllana	Unknown	Unknown	TBA
The success story of Efren "Bata" Reyes, who became known in the world of sports especially in billiards. This earned him the monicker of "The Magician". Supporting Cast: Eddie Garcia, Aleck Bovick
TBA	"Sa Bingit ng Katotohanan" (The Herminia Barlam Story)	Alma Moreno	Argel Joseph	Abet Raz	September 4, 2003
Heriminia is a mute mother who ill-fatedly became a witness to one of the most gruesome rape and slay cases in the country. Supporting Cast: Anita Linda, Chanda Romero, Meryll Soriano, Ryan Eigenmann, Maureen Mauricio, Racquel Villavicencio, Din-Din Llarena, Roje Zamora, Mike Gayoso, Gerald Madrid, Joseph Izon, Tom Olivar
TBA	"Mare, Pare... I Love You" (The Arnel Ignacio Story)	Jeffrey Quizon	Argel Joseph	Benedict Mique	September 11, 2003
This episode is based on Arnell's real-life experiences as a struggling artist, it will cover every part of Arnell's life, including his eccentricities as a lover and an artist, as well as how he evolved into a devoted husband and parent. Supporting Cast: Priscilla Almeda, Dante Rivero, Liza Lorena, Delia Razon, Allan K., Christian Vasquez, Pepe Pimentel, Ethel "Booba" Benison, Craig Cirola
TBA	"Hahawakan Ko ang Mundo sa Aking Palad" (The Melanie Marquez Story)	Alessandra De Rossi	Argel Joseph	Dode Cruz	September 18, 2003
Melanie Marquez was called the Filipina supermodel and became famous for being Miss International. Supporting Cast: Elizabeth Oropesa, Lito Legaspi, Ma. Isabel Lopez, Jake Roxas, Brando Legaspi, Mel Martinez, Joy Viado
TBA	"Pag-ibig Ko'y Di Magbabago" (The Kim delos Santos & Dino Guevarra Love Story)	Cogie Domingo; Iza Calzado	Argel Joseph	Dode Cruz	September 25, 2003
This episode tells the story of how one of their generation's most famous love teams came to life. Dino and Kim show how their chemistry plays a role in their real-life relationship despite their young age. Supporting Cast: Rio Locsin, Sharmaine Arnaiz, LJ Moreno, Jackie Castillejo, Czarina Lopez de Leon, Paolo Ballesteros
TBA	"Karayom sa Talahiban" (The Salome "Isadora" Velasquez Story)	Katya Santos	Argel Joseph	Leah Eriguel	October 9, 2003
Salome started as an actress in mature films but was acclaimed as one of the most successful actresses in her prime due to her talent. She left it all behind due to a fan's dedication and unquestionable love for her. Supporting Cast: Raymond Bagatsing, Frank Garcia, Leila Kuzma, Odette Khan, Philip Lazaro, Mike Magat, Dante Javier, Gloria Diaz
TBA	"Pangako ng Walang Hanggang Pagmamahal" (The Jomari Yllana Story)	Wendell Ramos	Argel Joseph	Leah Eriguel	October 16, 2003
This is the narrative of Jomari Yllana and how he rose to fame and became one of the most successful actors of his generation in the country and internationally. Supporting Cast: Mylene Dizon, Marianne Dela Riva, Nonie Buencamino, Andrew Schimmer, Timmyboy Sta. Maria, Johnny Delgado
TBA	"Nunal Sa Pisngi ng Pangarap" (The Gil "Ate Gay" Morales Story)	Ate Gay	Maryo J. de los Reyes	Abet Raz	October 23, 2003
Watch the story of the comedian Ate Gay and how he overcomes his struggles to find love and get accepted for who he is. Supporting Cast: Polo Ravales, Chanda Romero, Joko Diaz, Wilma Doesnt, Poppo Lontoc, Chokoleit, Patricia Ismael
TBA	"Katumbas ng Buhay" (The Sonny Parsons Story)	Sonny Parsons	Argel Joseph	Elmer Gatchalian	October 30, 2003
A former action star and former member of 70s pop group, Hagibis killed two gunmen in a real-life firefight with robbers who took his family hostage. Supporting Cast: Lani Mercado, Alma Concepcion, Eddie Gutierrez, Evangeline Pascual, Patrick dela Rosa, Edgar Mande, Anton Bernardo, Gerardo Pizarra, Jake Cuenca, Bobby Molina
TBA	"Uka sa Ulap" (The Elizabeth Oropesa Story)	Alice Dixson	Argel Joseph	Gina Marissa Tagasa	November 6, 2003
This episode covers the story of the actress Elizabeth Oropesa, who endured a life like a soap opera, and how she overcame all of it. Supporting Cast: Gary Estrada, Emilio Garcia, Boots Anson-Roa, Lilia Dizon, Richard Quan, Dennis Trillo, Mike Castillo, Ricci Chan, Kathy Arguelles, Irene Celebre
TBA	"Sa Likod ng Halakhak" (The Yoyoy Villame Story)	Jimmy Santos	Argel Joseph	Neil Gumban	November 13, 2003
Yoyoy Villame is the man behind the famous novelty songs that we still sing along to this day. Despite being the face of happiness and joy, he encounters a lot of hardships at the peak of his career in showbiz. Supporting Cast: Sandy Andolong, Klaudia Koronel, Nanette Inventor, Chubi Del Rosario, Ramon Zamora, Gary Lim, Gene Padilla, Jose Manalo, Boy Alano, Pekto, Tess Bomb
TBA	"Ano Ang Mukha ng Pag-ibig?" (The Maria Isabel Lopez Story)	Andrea Del Rosario	Joel Lamangan	Jun Lana	November 20, 2003
This is the tale of Maria Isabel Lopez, the 1982 Binibining Pilipinas Universe title holder, and how she managed to find love while not having a father figure at her side. Supporting Cast: Rita Avila, Ricardo Cepeda, Jaime Fabregas, Soxy Topacio, Roxanne Barcelo, Bon Vibar, Mara Isabel Lopez, Pilar Pilapil
TBA	"Sa Bawat Paglaban sa Agos ng Buhay" (The Laban o Bawi Winners Story)	Romnick Sarmenta; Harlene Bautista; Amy Perez	Argel Joseph	Dode Cruz	November 27, 2003
A two-part story about the families who participated and won in the "Laban o Bawi" portion of Eat Bulaga!. Supporting Cast: Perla Bautista, Isabella De Leon, Steven Claude Goyong, Jesette Prospero, Sharmaine Santiago, Allan K., Ruby Rodriguez, Jose Manalo, Anjo Yllana, Sexbomb Dancers
TBA	"Sa Paglihom ng mga Sugat" (The Rizal Day Bombing Story)	Symon Paul Mano, Joel Torre, Amy Austria	Argel Joseph	Elmer Gatchalian	December 4, 2003
The episode tells the story of husband and wife, Paul (Joel Torre) and Belle Umali (Amy Austria) and a child (Symon Paul Mano) who get his feet amputated due to the Rizal Day bombing incident on December 30, 2000 at the LRT Blumentritt that killed a number of people. Supporting Cast: Jaclyn Jose, Dan Fernadez, Emil Sandoval, Gilette Sandico
TBA	"Ang Tunay na Tagumpay" (The Susan Enriquez Story)	Gelli de Belen	Argel Joseph	Leah Eriguel	December 11, 2003
The eldest and only girl among five children, Susan (Gelli de Belen) grows up in Carmona, Cavite, selling bibingka in Biñan to help finance her education. As a probinsiyana, it is hard for her to fit into radio and TV. They give her the odd assignments and she reports on typhoons, floods and earthquake. She even covers the lethal injection of Leo Echegaray in Muntinlupa and the Basilan presscon of Abu Sayyaf. Susan is taken hostage by the terrorist group Abu Sayyaf in 2000 while on duty in Basilan and is freed for 200 sacks of rice. Supporting Cast: Daria Ramirez, Ace Espinosa, John Arcilla, Brandon Legaspi, Joseph Izon, Simon Ibarra, Victor Neri
TBA	"Nang Tumawa ang Kapalaran" (The Bert "Tawa" Marcelo Story)	Jose Manalo	Argel Joseph	Elmer Gatchalian	December 18, 2003
Fondly called Kaka by his barrio-mates and colleagues in showbiz, Bert Marcelo (Jose Manalo) resorted to odd jobs when he was young to augment the family income. Then his knack for making people laugh opened doors for him via a stage play that introduced him as a comedian. Soon after, he started to receive offers on TV. In December 1995, Bert succumbed to a heart attack. Supporting Cast: Janice de Belen, Gloria Sevilla, Pinky Marquez, Jake Roxas, Daniel Fernando, Geoff Eigenmann, Berting Labra, Spanky Manikan

=== 2004 ===
No. in season	Title	Cast	Directed by	Written by	Original release date
1	"Sa Isang Kanto ng Tagumpay" (The Siakol Story)	Epy Quizon; Vandolph; Boy2 Quizon	Argel Joseph	Dode Cruz	January 8, 2004
Noel (Epy Quizon), Miniong (Vandolph) and Wowie (Boy2 Quizon), the members of the popular three-member band, Siakol, share their life story on how they face the hardships of having a band until they reach success, becoming one of the most popular Filipino rock bands in the early 2000s. Supporting Cast: Pen Medina, Eva Darren, Dolphy Jr., Bing Davao, Susan Africa, Jenny Salimao, Archi Adamos, Michael Roy
2	"Sa Bawat Pagtakbo ng Buhay" (The Lydia de Vega-Mercado Story)	Princess Punzalan	Argel Joseph	Abet Raz	January 15, 2004
She is known as the "Sprint Queen." Lydia de Vega (Princess Punzalan) was considered Asia's fastest woman in the 1980s, trained by her own father, Tatang de Vega (Dante Rivero), until she became a champion. Her life as an athlete suddenly stops when love comes in the picture. Lydia is torn between her career and love life, in the end, she chooses to marry the man of her life, scarring her relationship with her father. Supporting Cast: Dante Rivero, Allan Paule, Alicia Alonzo
3	"Indak sa Pagtaas at Pagbaba ng Buhay" (The Joy Cancio & Sexbomb Story)	Regine Tolentino	Argel Joseph	Dode Cruz	January 22, 2004
Joy Cancio (Regine Tolentino), from being a former dancer of Vicor group to becoming an entertainer who made a name for herself in Japan, relates her life story not only as a daughter and a dancer but also as a mother, a wife and a mentor. She is the lady behind the successful all-girl dance group, SexBomb Girls. Supporting Cast: Lander Vera-Perez, Marissa Delgado, Rochelle Pangilinan, Jopay Paguia, Aira Bermudez, Kier Legaspi, Arjay Legaspi, Gigi Locsin
4	"Sa Kabila ng Kaniyang Pamamaalam" (The Jhunnalyn dela Peña Story)	Angel Locsin	Unknown	Unknown	January 29, 2004
When young actor Miko Sotto died on December 29, 2003, his mother, actress-turned-broadcaster Ali Sotto, decided that his corneas would be donated to a lucky recipient. Jhunnalyn dela Pena (Angel Locsin) becomes the recipient of Miko's corneas after she suffered an unfortunate accident that left her partially blinded in the right eye. Supporting Cast: Marissa Sanchez, Snooky Serna, Albert Martinez, Yayo Aguila
5	"May Liwanag sa Dilim" (The Willy Garte Story)	Ariel Rivera	Argel Joseph	Dode Cruz	February 5, 2004
The story of blind singer Willy Garte (Ariel Rivera), who became popular for his hits such as "Bawal na Gamot". Supporting Cast: Angel Aquino, Julio Diaz, Pen Medina, Malou de Guzman, Menggie Cobarrubias, Christian Galindo, Bryan Homicillo, Raul Russo, German Moreno
6	"Kadenang Salamin" (The Miriam Quiambao Story)	Miriam Quiambao	Argel Joseph	Gina Marissa Tagasa	February 12, 2004
Watch the life story of a young beautiful woman named Miriam and her journey to be the best on top. Supporting Cast: Tonton Gutierrez, Al Tantay, Gabby Eigenmann, Racquel Montesa, Sherilyn Reyes, Jan Marini, Michelle Estevez, Girlie Sevilla, Kristine Mangle, Camella Villamin, Monica Shy, Segundo Cernadas
7	"The Diego Llorico Story"	Diego Llorico	Unknown	Unknown	February 19, 2004
Before he become a comedian and one of the mainstays of the country's longest-running gag show Bubble Gang, Diego struggles for his family despite his homosexuality and unattractive looks. Supporting Cast: Dennis Trillo, Jordan Herrera
8	"Iba't Ibang Landas Tungo Sa Tagumpay" (The StarStruck Final Four Story)	Jennylyn Mercado, Mark Herras, Yasmien Kurdi, Rainier Castillo	Argel Joseph	Dode Cruz	February 26, 2004
Part 1 of the episode shows the individual life stories of the Final 4 of GMA's phenomenal top-rating reality artista search "Starstruck", before they joined the search. Supporting Cast: Amy Austria, Sandy Andolong, Rita Avila, Mark Gil, Rez Cortez, Eva Darren, Donnie Evangelista, Ferdie Bernal, Criselda Amistad
9	"Nang Magliwanag ang mga Bituin" (The StarStruck Story)	Jennylyn Mercado, Mark Herras, Yasmien Kurdi, Rainier Castillo	Argel Joseph	Denoy Navarro-Punio	March 4, 2004
This is the continuation of the life stories of Jennylyn Mercado, Mark Herras, Yasmien Kurdi, Ranier Castillo, and other Starstruck finalists. Supporting Cast: Amy Austria, Sandy Andolong, Rita Avila, Mark Gil, Rez Cortez, Eva Darren, StarStruck Avengers, Donnie Evangelista, Ferdie Bernal, Criselda Amistad, Lolit Solis, Douglas Quijano
10	"Tukso ng Tadhana" (The Eva Eugenio Story)	Rufa Mae Quinto	Argel Joseph	Abet Raz; Elmer Gatchalian	March 11, 2004
Eva is one of the most popular singers of her time, but her story of success is not as easy as it seems. Before she released her most famous song, she had already released a lot of songs that the public chose to ignore. Supporting Cast: Zoren Legaspi, Ryan Eigenmann, Dexter Doria, Ronnie Lazaro, Manny Castañeda, Simon Soler, Denise Laurel
11	"Nang Minsang Maligaw ng Landas" (The Janice Jurado Story)	Sunshine Dizon	Argel Joseph	Dode Cruz	March 18, 2004
Janice was a famous bold star of her time, but she became hooked on drugs during her stardom and at the zenith of her career. Supporting Cast: Celia Rodriguez, Jaclyn Jose, Ramon Christopher, Janus del Prado, Mel Kimura, Crispin Pineda, Nikki Laurel
12	"Bituin sa Langit ng mga Pangarap" (The Dexter "Teri Onor" Dominguez Story)	Teri Onor	Argel Joseph	Abet Raz	March 25, 2004
This is the story of comedian Teri Onor, who encounters obstacles before becoming the famous Nora Aunor impersonator. Supporting Cast: Elizabeth Oropesa, Bembol Roco, Jake Roxas, Toni Gonzaga, Marcus Madrigal, Simon Ibarra, Gerard Pizaras, Andrew de Real, Martin Mijares, Bacci, Veborah, Allan K.
13	"Nang Mamaalam ang Isang Reyna" (The Lourdes "Inday Badiday" Jimenez-Carvajal Story)	Angelu de Leon	Argel Joseph	Dode Cruz; Jenielle Enojo	April 1, 2004
The story of the Queen of Intrigues Inday Badiday (Angelu de Leon), who became popular for her shows laced with intrigue and sensationalism. However, after being diagnosed with kidney disease, she was no longer allowed to work in television. Supporting Cast: Ian Veneracion, Victor Neri, Danica Sotto, Chubi del Rosario, Sheena Halili, Loly Mara, Gileth Sandico, Say Alonzo, Mervin Lazaro, Stephanie Carvajal
14	"Kapag ang Pag-ibig ay Wagas" (The Gerry and Marlene Mariano Story)	Ara Mina; Jomari Yllana	Argel Joseph	Leah Eriguel	April 15, 2004
Gerry and Marlene are a couple with cerebral palsy. They discovered love and acceptance for each other and proved that love is eternal. Supporting Cast: Jennifer Sevilla, Maybeline dela Cruz, Antonio Aquitania, Luz Fernandez, Encar Benedicto, Romeo Rivera, Nante Montreal, Hanni Miller, Richard Somes
15	"May Kapalit ang Bawat Halakhak" (The Ethel "Booba" Gabison Story)	Maureen Larrazabal	Argel Joseph	Leah Eriguel	April 22, 2004
Ethel Gabison, from becoming a champion in the spring singing competition Sing Galing, became one of the most top-notch comediennes in Philippine entertainment industry. Supporting Cast: Hilda Koronel, Roy Alvarez, Kier Legaspi, K Brosas, Reggie Curley, Allen Dizon, KB de Jesus, BJ de Jesus, Nelson Evangelista, Gabriella Annjane Cruz
16	"Isang Milyong Laban ng mga Pangarap" (The Laban o Bawi Winners Story)	Manilyn Reynes, Tanya Garcia, Yayo Aguila	Argel Joseph	Benedict Mique	April 29, 2004
In January 2004, an unexpected fortune happened in the longest-running noontime show, ‘Eat Bulaga,’ as three of their contestants won the one million-peso jackpot prize of ‘Laban o Bawi’ for three consecutive weeks. Follow the stories of Rochelle (Tanya Garcia), Flordeliza (Manilyn Reynes), and Erma (Yayo Aguila) on how this grand opportunity changed their lives in an instant. Supporting Cast: Keempee de Leon, Dennis Trillo, William Martinez, Irma Adlawan, Yda Yaneza, Pocholo Montes, Dennis Marasigan, Allan K., Janno Gibbs, Danz Focus
17	"Lagalab sa Lalim ng Gabi" (The Jema Tabinas Story)	Ciara Sotto	Argel Joseph	Dode Cruz	May 6, 2004
A fire broke out inside the cruise ship, causing Jema to wake up in the middle of the night. This is her story and how she survived the calamity. Supporting Cast: Helen Gamboa, Jao Mapa, Spanky Manikan, Archie Adamos, Samuel Abriza, Aldrin Gonzales
18	"Sabay Sa Tunog ng Tagumpay" (The Jacque Estevez Story)	Jacque Estevez	Argel Joseph	Abet Raz	May 13, 2004
This is about the story of Jacque and how she overcame hurdles in her family and life before becoming a famous Sexbomb girl dancer. Supporting Cast: Caridad Sanchez, Lara Melissa de Leon, Tonton Gutierrez, Glenda Garcia, Joy Cancio, Sexbomb Dancers, Danz Focus
19	"Ikaw at Ako, Walang Iwanan" (The Mike "Pekto" Nacua Story)	Pekto	Argel Joseph	Dode Cruz	May 20, 2004
Pekto was a propsman for TV programs before becoming a famous comedian. Due to his remarkable talent for making people laugh, he rose to fame and became a part of numerous TV shows. Supporting Cast: Assunta De Rossi, Michael Flores, Ces Quesada, Jim Pebanco, Minnie Aguilar, John Medina, Janno Gibbs
20	"Dahil Muli't Muling Magmamahal" (The K Brosas Story)	K Brosas	Argel Joseph	Benedict Mique	May 27, 2004
K Brosas' mother gives her away as a baby, making her an aunt's adopted daughter. Her life began in a difficult period before she entered show business. Supporting Cast: Pinky de Leon, Giselle Sanchez, Emilio Garcia, Gabby Eigenmann, Alfred Vargas, Mon Confiado, Robert Ortega, Bon Vibar, Beverly Salviejo, Gilleth Sandico, Amy Robles, Dido dela Paz, Roje Zamora
21	"Sa Pangalawang Alapaap" (The Tata Esteban Story)	Raymond Bagatsing	Argel Joseph	Gina Marissa Tagasa	June 3, 2004
He's known as the most iconic directors of bold movies during the 1980s. But, despite the fame he's experiencing, he became addicted to vices including drugs. But his deep faith in God, changed his life forever. Supporting Cast: Ynez Veneracion, Alicia Alonzo, Julio Diaz, CJ Ramos, Sean Ignacio, Bryan Homicillo, Archie Ventisa, Igi Boy Flores, Donnie Evangelista, Chiqui del Carmen, Hanni Miller, Kriselda Kristel, Karina Zobel, Zandra Montero, Isabela Gomez, Raja Montero, Miguel Garcia, Keanna Reeves
22	"Ang Salamin ng Kanyang mga Pangarap" (The Giselle Sanchez Story)	Giselle Sanchez	Argel Joseph	Elmer Gatchalian	June 10, 2004
This is the story of comedian Giselle Sanchez and how she overcame all of her obstacles to achieve fame. Supporting Cast: Ariel Rivera, Pilar Pilapil, Eddie Gutierrez, Iza Calzado, Marc Solis, Jerome Ocampo, Aliyah Mortel, Kristel Fulgar, Kristine Mangle, Manilyn Reynes
23	"Nang Mangarap ang Musikero" (The Jimmy Bondoc Story)	Jimmy Bondoc	Argel Joseph	Benedict Mique	June 17, 2004
This is how Jimmy Bondoc, a musician, made a name for himself and wrote the song "Let Me Be The One," which became an instant hit. Supporting Cast: Elizabeth Oropesa, Michael De Mesa, Gary Estrada, Angel Locsin, Maricar de Mesa, Joe D' Mango, Sharmagne Santiago, Diego Malvar, Carlo Enriquez, Glenn Dizon, Dustin Reyes
24	"Babangon Din ang Kahapon" (The Comfort Women Story)	Sunshine Dizon; Alessandra De Rossi	Argel Joseph	Elmer Gatchalian	June 24, 2004
This is the story of two comfort women who became sex slaves during WWII and how they struggled through the suffering to tell their painful experiences to the rest of the world. Supporting Cast: Victor Neri, Jaclyn Jose, Daniel Fernando, James Blanco, Dennis Trillo, Isabelle de Leon, Trisha Roman, Sid Lucero, Alicia Alonzo, Eva Darren, Ramil Rodriguez, Abet Zialcita, Marky Lopez, Liza Diño, Raul Russo, Tony Bueno, Paolo Maderal, Macky Aquino, Richard Laforteza
25	"Indayog Sa Pagdating Ng Umaga" (The Sunshine Garcia Story)	Sunshine Garcia	Argel Joseph	Dode Cruz	July 1, 2004
Sunshine holds a grudge against her father for finding another woman after her mother died. Supporting Cast: Princess Punzalan, John Regala, Maybelyn Dela Cruz, Honah Jean, Lester Liansang, Kontin Roque, Joy Cancio, Mia Pangyarihan, Cynthia Yapchingco, Aira Bermudez, Pretty Trisha, Carme Sanchez, Jimmy Santos, Ruby Rodriguez
26	"Mga Bakas Ng Kahapon" (The Ynez Veneracion Story)	Ynez Veneracion	Argel Joseph	Benedict Mique	July 8, 2004
Ynez eagerly seeks genuine affection from plenty of men to compensate for the things that her father is unable to provide for her. Supporting Cast: Bembol Roco, Susan Africa, Nino Muhlach, Mon Confiado, Pinky Amador, Richard Quan, Toby Alejar, Neil Ryan Sese, Cesar Xerex, Criselda, Kristel, Karina Zobel, Josie Tagle, BJ de Jesus, Erwin Del Rosario, Romnick Sarmienta
27	"Sa Muling Pagdating Ng Panahon" (The Aiza Seguerra Story)	Aiza Seguerra	Argel Joseph	Gina Marissa Tagasa	July 15, 2004
Aiza won the hearts of millions of Filipinos when she became one of the contestants of Little Miss Philippines, and became one of the most in-demand child stars during the late 1980s to the early 1990s. But in the early part of the new millennium, she would once again rose up to fame as an acoustic singer because of her hit song "Pagdating ng Panahon". But despite the fame, she was not immune to controversies especially her sexual preference. Supporting Cast: Sam Bumatay, Gina Pareño, Leo Martinez, Iya Villania, Mel Kimura, Gigette Reyes, Amy Robles, Lyn Tamayo
28	"Isang Iglap Tungo Sa Pangarap" (The Dion Ignacio Story)	Dion Ignacio	Argel Joseph	Dode Cruz	July 22, 2004
This is the story of Dion Ignacio, a Starstruck alumnus, and how his regular life is unexpectedly changed. Supporting Cast: Amy Austria, Jestoni Alarcon, Jake Cuenca, Eagle Riggs, Margaret Wilson, Mids Garcia, Nadine Samonte, Sheena Halili, Cristine Reyes, Jade Lopez, Alvin Aragon, Anton Del Paz
29	"Dahil Muling Sisikat ang Araw" (The Patricia Javier Story)	Patricia Javier	Argel Joseph	Benedict Mique	July 29, 2004
Patricia Javier merely wants to help her family by entering showbiz news by displaying her body and eventually, her singing abilities. Supporting Cast: Chanda Romero, Rez Cortez, Troy Montero, Alma Concepcion, Ella Guevarra, Oliver Garcia
30	"Halos Sumuko Pati Langit" (The John Regala Story)	John Regala	Argel Joseph	Benedict Mique	August 5, 2004
Having a painful childhood, John suffered maltreatment at the hands of his relatives when his mother Ruby, a former actress decided to work abroad. He would then join the world of showbiz when he became part of the popular youth-oriented show That's Entertainment, and would rise to fame by becoming one of the most popular action stars and character actors of his generation, playing either as a protagonist or antagonist. But despite the glitz and glamour that he has, he became more prone to vices, causing his stardom to decline. Supporting Cast: Liza Lorena, Angel Aquino, Delia Razon, Alvin Aragon, Juliana Palermo, Jon Santos, Lui Manansala, Jessette Prospero, Allona Amor, Archie Adamos, Pocholo Montes, Nante Montreal, Ramon Christopher, German Moreno
31	"Tagumpay sa Kabila ng Lahat" (The Grace Padaca Story)	Janice de Belen	Argel Joseph	Elmer Gatchalian	August 12, 2004
Stricken with polio, Grace Padaca never stop from dreaming despite her disability. From her stint in radio, she decided to gamble her career and entered politics. After her painful defeat for a seat in the House of Representatives, she ran again and won as governor of her home province of Isabela, defeating incumbent governor Faustino Dy, marking the end of the 32-year political rule of the Dys. Supporting Cast: Boots Anson-Roa, Kathryn Bernardo, Dante Rivero, Jennifer Sevilla, Allan Paule, Tony Mabesa, Bong dela Torre, Lawrence Roxas
32	"Iba't-ibang Baraha ng Buhay" (The Madam Auring Story)	Gina Pareño	Argel Joseph	Abi Lam	August 19, 2004
This is the story of Madam Auring, a fortune teller who predicts the artists future at a glance. Supporting Cast: Manilyn Reynes, Lotlot de Leon, Gloria Sevilla, Dexter Doria, Spanky Manikan, Kier Legaspi, Gerard Madrid, Melissa Mendez, Jhoana Marie Tan, Lito Legaspi, Simon Ibarra
33	"Minsan May Isang Anak" (The Francine Prieto Story)	Francine Prieto	Argel Joseph	Dode Cruz	September 2, 2004
When Francine Prieto entered the entertainment industry, she was only a young kid, and her family became her top priority. But as a child, she faced criticism for standing out from both her siblings and the general populace. Supporting Cast: Jean Saburit, Juan Rodrigo, Chynna Ortaleza, Joonee Gamboa, Shyr Valdez, Jim Pebangco, John Medina, Miguel Garcia, Michael Alfonso, Angelina Plummer, Pamela Natividad
34	"Minsan May Isang Tagapagligtas" (Saver The Wonder Dog and Mang June Story)	Rudy Fernandez	Unknown	Unknown	September 9, 2004
The story of Mang June and Saver The Wonder Dog Supporting Cast:
35	"Ikaw Pa Rin Sa Bandang Huli" (The Raven Villanueva Story)	Raven Villanueva	Argel Joseph	Dode Cruz	September 23, 2004
Raven was a well-known teen star on the youth-oriented show "T.G.I.S.," but her dreams were crushed when she became pregnant. Supporting Cast: Albert Martinez, Lilia Dizon, Diego Castro, Bettina Carlos, Michael Flores, Alma Concepcion, Evangeline Pascual, Julia Montes
36	"Sayaw ng Tagumpay" (The Aira Bermudez Story)	Aira Bermudez	Argel Joseph	Abi Lam	September 30, 2004
This is the story of Sexbomb dancer Aira, who competed in numerous competitions before becoming one of the country's largest girl groups. Supporting Cast: Elizabeth Oropesa, Romnick Sarmienta, Daniel Fernando, Rochelle Pangilinan, Regine Tolentino, Raquel Montesa, Jordan Herrera, Ernie Zarate, Mia Pangyarihan, Cynthia Yapchengco, Sandy Tolentino, Joana Marie Orbeta, Leo, Awo, Ola
37	"Dahil Muling Aawit Ang Tagumpay" (The Dice & K9 Story)	Geneva Cruz; AJ Eigenmann; Gabby Eigenmann; Ryan Eigenmann	Argel Joseph	Abet Raz	October 7, 2004
This is the story of the hip-hop group 'Dice and K9' and how they came to be successful. Supporting Cast: Dino Guevarra, Sylvia Sanchez, Mat Ranillo, Pinky Marquez, Lander Vera Perez, Suzette Ranillo, Ihman Esturco, Meds Garcia, KB De Jesus, Jari Gomez
38	"Ano ang Kulay ng Tunay na Pagmamahal" (The Jennylyn Mercado Untold Story)	Jennylyn Mercado	Argel Joseph	Dode Cruz	October 14, 2004
Jennylyn Mercado is the first female ultimate survivor of GMA Network's reality competition, "StarStruck". But, despite her success, a question remains unanswered in her mind: whether she was adopted or not. Supporting Cast: Sandy Andolong, Gina Alajar, John Regala, Nonie Buencamino, Mark Herras, Chinggay Riego, Kristel Fulgar, Lorna Tolentino
39	"Katuparan ng Munting Pangarap" (The Jessa Zaragoza Story)	Jessa Zaragoza	Argel Joseph	Dode Cruz	October 21, 2004
This is the story of Jessa Zaragoza before she became a hit singer with her popular hit song "Bakit Pa?" Supporting Cast: Hilda Koronel, Caridad Sanchez, Rez Cortez, Dingdong Avanzado, Alfred Vargas, Lloyd Zaragoza, Abby Abrazo, Gamliel Viray, Allan Noble, Mcmiel Dennison, Say Alonzo, Lolit Solis, German Moreno
40	"Hahamakin ang Lahat" (The Barbara Milano Story)	Katherine Luna	Argel Joseph	Benedict Mique	November 4, 2004
Barbara Milano was one of the most daring sexy stars during the early 2000s. But, she decided to take another step of her career when she entered the field of politics, running for councilor of her hometown of Talavera, Nueva Ecija. How will she able to serve the people, even though many of them known her as just a sexy actress? Supporting Cast: Tonton Gutierrez, Ricardo Cepeda, Lara Melissa De Leon, Dan Fernandez, Jaime Fabregas, Charlie Davao, Dido Dela Paz, Amy Robles, Raul Russo, Von Vibar, Susan Lim, Hana Imperial
41	"Minsan May isang Pangarap" (The Anthony "Anton Diva" Ragaza Story)	Cogie Domingo	Argel Joseph	Abet Raz	November 11, 2004
He is well-known as the impersonator of Asia's Songbird, Regine Velasquez, for his immaculate impersonation of the singer. But people are unaware that Anton Diva has a difficult past. Supporting Cast: Jeffrey Quizon, Dexter Doria, Dick Israel, Cristine Reyes, Joseph Hizon, Neil Ryan Sese, Simon Ibarra, Shyr Valdez, Eric King, JD Dionisio
42	"Ang Pag-usbong ng Isang Reyna" (The Amalia Fuentes Story)	Nadine Samonte	Argel Joseph	Dode Cruz	November 18, 2004
Amalia Fuentes, was one of the most beautiful faces of Philippine cinema, and would be known as the "Elizabeth Taylor of the Philippines". But behind the glitz and glamour, is a painful past and what will happen at the height of her career. Supporting Cast: Chanda Romero, Dennis Roldan, Mark Gil, Shermaine Santiago, CJ Ramos, Gian Bernabe, Eliza Pineda, Jiego Malvar
43	"Sapagkat Mahal Kita" (The Gerrard Pizarras and Jan Marini Love Story)	Jan Marini; Gerrard Pizarras	Argel Joseph	Abi Lam	November 25, 2004
Gerrard and Jan work in show business and are dedicated parents to their only child. Their lives were turned upside down when Gerrad was diagnosed with Bell palsy. Supporting Cast: Rio Locsin, Sherilyn Reyes, Alicia Mayer, Tom Olivar, Bianca Marie Binene, John Nite, Tessie Villarama, Daniel Bernal, Dang Amistad, Paolo De Los Santos, Arlo Antonio
44	"May Kulay Ba Ang Pagmamahal" (The Jinky Oda Story)	Sheryl Cruz	Argel Joseph	Dode Cruz	December 2, 2004
She rose to fame for her role as Bale in the sitcom 'Okay Ka, Fairy Ko!' since then, people have been making fun of Jinky Oda's (Sheryl Cruz) skin color since she was a child. Supporting Cast: Boots Anson-Roa, Bernadette Allyson, Kier Legaspi, Tin Arnaldo, Bing Davao, Joy Viado, Paul Salas, Pamela Natividad, Beatrice Labao, Gerlie Alcantara, Cocoy Palma, Dennis Apacible, Josephine Ramos, Yvette Yuzon, Monto Tirasol
45	"Minsan May Pangako" (The Juliana Palermo Story)	Juliana Palermo	Argel Joseph	Benedict Mique	December 9, 2004
Juliana Palermo (Herself) is one of the most famous and daring stars of her generation; her fame grew as news agencies gained access to her family and her one and only siblings, whom she protects from the judging eyes of society. Supporting Cast: Gina Alajar, Michael De Mesa, Rita Avila, Lester Llansang, Jhoana Marie Tan, Bryan Homicillo, Gilleth Sandico, Happee Lyn Sy, Ashley Sylverio, Urias Potter, Daniel Bollay
46	"Sa Bawat Pagsubok Ng Isang Idolo" (The Jolina Magdangal Story)	Jolina Magdangal	Argel Joseph	Dode Cruz	December 16, 2004
Jolina started her career at a young age. She would join a popular youth-oriented gag show Ang TV. While growing up as a young lady, she would become known as one of the most in-demand young actress and singer, and a pop-culture icon during the late 1990s until the early part of the new millennium. Supporting Cast: Ces Quesada, Tommy Abuel, Keempee de Leon, Mel Martinez, Reggie Curley, Gigette Reyes, Sandy Talag, Justine Rosana, Andrea Gonzales, Angel Estrada, Donnie Evangelista, Gigi Locsin, Andfrew Del Real, Butch Miraflor, Arlene Regala, Marg Bernardo

=== 2005 ===
No. in season	Title	Cast	Directed by	Written by	Original release date
1	"Sa Muling Pagsilip ng Liwanag" (The Jose and Permelita Claro Story)	Christopher de Leon; Sandy Andolong	Argel Joseph	Benedict Mique	January 6, 2005
Supporting Cast: Aya Medel, Eva Darren, Spanky Manikan, Ramil Rodriguez, Rowena Samson, Sandra Delos Reyes, Mary Jane Montreal, Jose Mari Cera
2	"Handog Ay Isang Awit" (The Nonoy Zuñiga Story)	Ariel Rivera	Argel Joseph	Benedict Mique	January 13, 2005
Nonoy lives a double life as a singer and as a medical doctor. But, a bombing incident would cause him to lose his leg. Despite his disability, he continued his love for music and would become known for his songs like "Doon Lang", "Never Ever Say Goodbye" and many others, becoming one of the hitmakers in Philippine music. Supporting Cast: Ronnie Quizon, Mon Confiado, Charlon Davao, Lito Legaspi, Encar Benedicto, Iza Calzado, Criselda Volks, Kuhdet Honasan, Lito Calzado, Boy Alano
3	"Una't Huling Makapiling" (The Evette Pabalan Story)	Evette Palaban	Argel Joseph	Dode Cruz	January 20, 2005
The group Sexbomb became recognized for their incredible dance, but after joining the singing field, it opened an opportunity for Evette to join the group and display her singing abilities. Supporting Cast: Tessie Tomas, Allan Paule, John Regala, Regine Tolentino, Jhoana Marie Tan, Rosemarie Sarita, Marie Dionne De Guzman, Edgar Sandalo, Rochelle Pangilinan, Izzy Trazona, Jopay Paguia, Monic Icban, Weng Ibarra
4	"Samahang Walang Kapantay" (The Raging Divas Story)	Michael De Mesa; Romnick Sarmenta; Wowie De Guzman; Paolo Contis; Mel Martinez	Argel Joseph	Dode Cruz	January 27, 2005
Their group was first introduced in the morning talk-show Sis, a group of gays behind the most amazing celebrity impersonation, but behind their funny personalities is a heartbreaking story. Supporting Cast: Raquel Montesa, Pen Medina, Tyron Perez, Gilleth Sandico, Andre De Real, Justin De Leon, Lelet, Twinkle, Pola, Alanis, Chanel
5	"Minsan May Isang Anak" (The Katrina Halili Story)	Katrina Halili	Argel Joseph	Abi Lam	February 3, 2005
Supporting Cast: Rio Locsin, Juan Rodrigo, Lloyd Samartino, Symon Soler, Irene Celebre, Sheena Halili, Cristine Reyes, Andrew Schimmer, Abby Abrazo, Eva Vibar, Mila Montanez, Alliyah Mortel, Rollie Inocencio, Mark Anthony Legaspi, Raul Russo
6	"Kapag Puso Ang Timbangan" (The William and Yayo Martinez Story)	William Martinez; Yayo Aguila	Argel Joseph	Dode Cruz	February 10, 2005
William Martinez and Yayo Aguila both worked together in the blockbuster youth-oriented movie Bagets, until their love team became a reality. They're marriage will take a huge blow when William was arrested for possession of illegal drugs. Despite everything, the couple never gave up until William was acquitted. Supporting Cast: Albert Martinez, Yasmien Kurdi, Rainier Castillo, Maricel Morales, John Romano, Archie Adamos, Lui Manansala, Emmanuel Aquino, Ali Mcleon
TBA	"Sa Iyo Lamang" (The Drs. Manny and Pie Calayan Story)	Tonton Gutierrez; Glydel Mercado	Argel Joseph	Abi Lam	February 24, 2005
Before becoming one of the top dermatologists in the Philippines, Drs. Manny and Pie Calayan, too, began with nothing as they navigated the trials of adolescence. Being married at a young age and dealing with family criticism, they both practiced hard work and perseverance, which resulted in a successful career as dermatology icons. Supporting Cast: Liza Lorena, Robert Arevalo, Anne Villegas, Evangeline Pascual, Romeo Rivera, Girlie Sevilla, Simon Ibarra, Giego Malvar, Maricar de Niega, Ehra Madrigal, Gigi Locsin
TBA	"Palimos ng Pangarap" (The Bernabe Dodong Pasagad Story Story)	Jose Manalo; Eddie Gutierrez	Argel Joseph	Benedict Mique	March 3, 2005
Supporting Cast: Maybelyn dela Cruz, Patricia Ysmael, Rosemarie Sarita, Crispin Pineda, Christian Galindo, Dino Erece
TBA	"Sa Kabila ng Lahat" (The Aya Medel Story)	Aya Medel	Argel Joseph	Abi Lam	March 10, 2005
This is the story of Aya Medel, a humble countryside girl who wanted to escape her abusive father. She enters the world of being a sexy star but leaves it all behind because of love. Supporting Cast: Elizabeth Oropesa, Dante Rivero, Allen Dizon, Lorenzo Mara, Jim Pebangco, Cherrie Lou Maglasang, Czarina De Leon, Chiqui Del Carmen, Allan Noble, Robert ‘alanis’ Casipit, Neil Ryan Sese, Lawrence Roxas, Donnie Evangelista, Justine Rossana, Angel Estrada, Ron Anderson, Rother Tiglao, Anne Astoria, Arriane Mondido, Kris Yoshiaki
TBA	"Nang Magbukas ng Pinto ang Langit" (The Brother Eddie Villanueva Story)	Joel Torre	Argel Joseph	Abi Lam	March 17, 2005
Eddie has encountered numerous threats in his life, yet he perseveres and is successful in making his life worthwhile. Supporting Cast: Cherry Pie Picache, Perla Bautista, Pocholo Montes, Tessie Villarama, Simon Ibarra, Kirby De Jesus, Krizzy Jareno, Gigette Reyes, Menggie Cobarrubias, Edwin Serrano, Crispin Medina
TBA	(The Alma Concepcion Story)	Alma Concepcion	TBA	TBA	TBA
From her stint in a beauty pageant, Alma entered showbusiness and became one of the most alluring sexy actresses in the mid 1990s. But, her career almost shattered when she was arrested in Guam for illegal drugs.
TBA	"Sa Kanya na Kumakatok, Ang Pinto ay Pagbubuksan" (The Vicente Undecimo Story)	John Arcilla	Argel Joseph	Abi Lam	April 7, 2005
Vicente is a kind and caring person by his family and the people in his community, but he had no idea that the simple tooth pain he ignored would develop into a terrible illness. Supporting Cast: Gina Alajar, Julia Clarete, Joseph Hizon, Nonie Buencamino, Kiel Rodriguez, Kris Martinez, Dang Amistad, Kookie Bronoso, Chinggay Riego, Rolie Innocencio, Mario Magallona, Raul Russo, Terio Francisco, Manolo Barrientos
TBA	"Laban sa Magandang Kinabukasan" (The Mitchel Martinez Story)	Rochelle Pangilinan	Argel Joseph	Dode Cruz	April 14, 2005
Supporting Cast: Daria Ramirez, Ronnie Lazaro, Lester Llansang, Ramon Christopher, Ailyn Luna, Minda Flores, Rasha Mae Manantan, Daniel Nolasco
TBA	"Isang Pag-ibig na Itinakda ng Langit" (The Manilyn Reynes Story)	Manilyn Reynes (as Herself); Ryza Cenon (as teenage Manilyn)	Argel Joseph	Abet Raz	April 21, 2005
Manilyn Reynes' voice was discovered by Mother Lily Monteverde, and she was cast in the hit variety show 'That's Entertainment' by 'Master Showman' German Moreno. Despite her brilliant career under Kuya Germs' management, she began to fall in love with her co-stars Janno Gibbs and Keempee de Leon, resulting in a devastating heartbreak. Supporting Cast: Kirby de Jesus, Marianne dela Riva, JC de Vera, Aljon Jimenez, German Moreno, Mat Ranillo III, Jhoana Marie Tan
TBA	"Liwanag Tungo sa Kinabukasan" (The Jojo "Buko King" Montemayor Story)	Mike "Pekto" Nacua	Argel Joseph	Dode Cruz	April 28, 2005
Jojo Montemayor was recognized for his strange yet exceptional knack for peeling coconut with his teeth, and he is a humble individual who uses his talents to help his family. Supporting Cast: January Isaac, James Blanco, Jaime Fabregas, Bing Davao, Alvin Aragon, Benj Pasia, Shamaine Centenera, Bryan Homicillo, Jeon Macatangay, Shun Ignacio
TBA	"Sa Kabila Ng Sakit" (A Mother's Day Special)	Lorna Tolentino; Nonie Buencamino	Argel Joseph	Elmer Gatchalian	May 5, 2005
A couple that swears to be together in sickness and in health is diagnosed with AIDS, and their children are also infected. Supporting Cast: Eva Darren, Neil Ryan Sese, Mark Philip Hernandez, Stephen James Torda
TBA	"Dahil Iginuhit ng Tadhana" (The Ruby Rodriguez Story)	Manilyn Reynes	Argel Joseph	Benedict Mique	May 12, 2005
Ruby is well-known for her part as a comedian in the popular TV show' Eat Bulaga,' but behind her jolly personality, popularity, and comfortable life, she still goes through difficult times. Supporting Cast: Dante Rivero, Dexter Doria, Keempee de Leon, Mel Kimura, Sharmaine Santiago, Sam Bumatay, John Medina, Bacci, Janna De Leon, Hillary Isaac, Mariah Velasquez, Marc Enriquez
TBA	"Karera Patungo sa Pangarap" (The Annalyn "Lady Jockey" Reloto Story)	Aiza Seguerra	Argel Joseph	Benedict Mique	May 19, 2005
This is the story of Analyn Reloto, the woman who entered the world of horse racing and was known as the first female jockey or the ‘Lady Jockey.’ Supporting Cast: Dick Israel, Raquel Montesa, Jhong Hilario, Robert Ortega, Marc Solis, Empress Schuck, Sam Bumatay, Ana Mae Mariveles
TBA	"Buhay na Walang Hanggan" (The Mars Ravelo Story)	Dennis Trillo	Argel Joseph	Dode Cruz	May 26, 2005
From being a janitor at Bulaklak Komiks, Mars Ravelo would venture in the world of comics writing. There he would be known as the person behind the success of Darna, Dyesebel, Captain Barbell, Lastikman and many others that became part of Filipino culture. Supporting Cast: Valerie Concepcion, Mia Gutierrez, Arcjie Adamos, Glenda Garcia, Simon Ibarra, Raul Russo, Dinky Doo Jr., Domingo Glandicho, Marissa Victoria, Jeon Macatangay, Angel Locsin, Celia Rodriguez
TBA	"Sa Ngalan ng Pag-ibig" (The Edgar Eniego Story)	Richard Gutierrez	Argel Joseph	Dode Cruz	June 2, 2005
Supporting Cast: Bianca King, Bembol Roco, Romnick Sarmienta, Toby Alejar, Raquel Villaviencio, Charlon Davao, Banjo Romero, Lawrence Roxas, Erwin Serrano, Rochelle Real, Crispin Medina Jr.
TBA	"Paghilom sa Isang Sugat ng Paghihintay" (The Johlan Veluz Story)	Johlan Veluz	Argel Joseph	Abet Raz	June 9, 2005
This is the story of Johlan Veluz (herself), who was bullied for not being good enough to be a member of the group Sexbomb, but she persevered to support her family. Supporting Cast: Vivian Foz, Lito Pimentel, Regine Tolentino, Ailyn Luna, Ken Punzalan, Loly Mara, Nicole Dulalia, Bianca Pulmano, Julius Gomez, Cheche Tolentino, Cynthia Yapchingco, Joanna Marie Orbeta, Aifha Medina, Sugar Mercado
TBA	"Biyayang Paslit" (The Moncayo Family Story)	Hilda Koronel; Julio Diaz	Argel Joseph	Abi Lam	June 16, 2005
This is the story of the Moncayo family, who face difficulties as a result of an illness that forces their child to sacrifice his childhood to care for his family. Supporting Cast: Renz Valerio, Eva Vibar, Jessette Prospero, Girlie Alcantara, Gigi Locsin
TBA	"Sa Ngalan ng Paglilingkod" (The Wilma Dupagen-Daquioag Story)	Ara Mina	Argel Joseph	Abet Raz	June 30, 2005
When duty calls out in her hometown, a domestic servant will stop at nothing to assist the one in need; she even assumed the role of mayor. Supporting Cast: Chanda Romero, Charlie Davao, Yul Servo, Reggie Curley, Cristine Reyes, John Apacible, Mel Kimura, Shamaine Centenera, Irma Adlawan, Mailes Canapi, Carme Sanchez, Abet Zialcita, Luming Medrano
TBA	"Ang Kulay ng Tagumpay" (The Juliet Chavez Story)	Aira Bermudez	Argel Joseph	Abi Lam	July 7, 2005
Juliet (Aira Bermudez) was known as the first woman of the Dumagat tribe who won a beauty contest and became the symbol of their tribe. Supporting Cast: Allan Paule, Melissa Mendez, Biboy Ramirez, Richard Quan, Via Veloso, Gilleth Sandico, Idda Yaneza, Rosemarie Sarita, Joseph Reyes, Kookie Bronoso
TBA	"Sa Pagbuo ng Mga Pangarap" (The Valerie Concepcion Story)	Valerie Concepcion	Argel Joseph	Benedict Mique	July 14, 2005
This is Valerie Concepcion's story and how she became one of the child stars with the potential to be the next big thing. But all of her celebrity disappeared in an instant as the news broke of her unexpected pregnancy. Supporting Cast: Jeremy Marquez, Emilio Garcia, Ana Marie Gutierrez, Princess Schuck, Cris Martinez, Sean Ignacio, Bobby Molina
TBA	"Himig ng Isang Pinoy Pop Superstar" (The Jonalyn Viray Story)	Ciara Sotto	Argel Joseph	Dode Cruz	July 21, 2005
This is the story of the first Grand Pinoy Pop Superstar winner, Jonnalyn Viray, and how she overcame all her struggles. Supporting Cast: Gardo Versoza, Lani Mercado, Sheila Israel, Joanna Marie Morales, Edlyn Tallada, Mara Garcia, Bacci, Mark Castillo, Focel Bagas, Jea Valle, Pia Guanio
TBA	"Sa Kabila ng Lahat" (The Hanni Miller Story)	Hanni Miller	Argel Joseph	Benedict Mique	July 28, 2005
She's one of the sexy stars who aspires to be a top actress, but Hanni Miller's (Herself) dreams got snatched when it was revealed that she had cancer in her uterus. Supporting Cast: Mark Gil, Maricar de Mesa, Jao Mapa, Troy Montero, Nina Medina, Dennis Marasigan, Mariel Custodio, Aya Mariveles, Gloria Diaz
TBA	"Sa Aking Paglaya" (The Angelo dela Cruz Story)	Bong Revilla	Argel Joseph	Elmer Gatchalian	August 4, 2005
This is the story of Angelo, an OFW kidnapped by terrorists in Iraq. The entire world was worried about his well-being and what might come of his freedom. Supporting Cast: Angel Aquino, Bryan Revilla, Pepoy Bardos, Tessie Villarima, Megan Young, John Romano, Crispin Medina Jr., Ann Murphy, Edwin Serrano, Shiela Mae Junsay
TBA	"Sa Kabila ng mga Halakhak" (The Vincent Daffalong Story)	Pekto	Argel Joseph	Abi Lam	August 11, 2005
Vincent Daffalong is known for his hit novelty song "Mahiwagang Nunal" and became one of the most popular novelty singers. However, series of events would lead to his gradual decline in his singing career. Supporting Cast: Bing Loyzaga, Daria Ramirez, Dick Israel, Gerard Madrid, Sherwin Ordonez, Gilleth Sandico, Patricia Ysmael, Lawrence Roxas, Jeon Macatangay
TBA	"Isang Wagas na Pag-ibig" (The Tenten Muñoz Story)	Jolina Magdangal	Argel Joseph; Louie Ignacio	Benedict Mique	August 18, 2005
Shot entirely in San Francisco, California, it tells the story of Tanghalan ng Kampeon winner Tenten Muñoz, who was the original voice behind the hit song Kaba. Tenten went to the United States to pursue an international career. However, she was diagnosed with a brain tumor that would lead to her death at a very young age of 19. Supporting Cast: Bobby Andrews, Amy Austria, John Arcilla, Gabby Eigenmann, Pocholo Montes, Ella Guevarra, Paul Salas
TBA	"Kapag Naging Buo na Ako" (The Joyce Jimenez Story)	Joyce Jimenez	Argel Joseph; Louie Ignacio	Dode Cruz	August 25, 2005
Shot entirely in Los Angeles, California, it tells the story of Joyce Jimenez, how she became known as the country's "Pantasya ng Bayan" during the early part of the 2000s. Supporting Cast: Rio Locsin, Mat Ranillo, Ryan Eigenmann, Antonio Aquitania, Reggie Curley, Gigette Reyes, Jerome Ocampo, Janna De Leon, Christine Barchini, Deandro Almariego
TBA	"Tayong Dalawa Hanggang Wakas" (The Rodel Velayo and Daniella Story)	Paolo Contis; Katrina Halili	Argel Joseph	Benedict Mique	September 1, 2005
Daniella and Rodel Velayo were known for their daring roles during the late 1990s. As bold movies gradually declined, Daniella and Rodel struggled to make ends meet, proving their love for each other that led to their marriage. Supporting Cast: Ernie Garcia, Mel Kimura, Rosemarie Sarita, Ihman Esturco, Queniee Reyves
TBA	"Ilang Hakbang Tungo Sa Pangarap" (The Giovannie Pico Story)	Rufa Mae Quinto	Argel Joseph; Louie Ignacio	Elmer Gatchalian	September 8, 2005
This is the story of Giovannie Espiritu, the first Filipina television, film, and stage actress who began her career as medical student Ludlow on NBC's top-rated hospital program ER in 2004-05 episodes. Supporting Cast: Jacklyn Jose, Joonee Gamboa, Gloria Sevilla, KC Montero, Juan Rodrigo, Isay Alvarez, Lyn Tamayo, Jemimah Sebino
TBA	"Till Death Do Us Part" (The Katya Santos Story)	Katya Santos	Argel Joseph	Abi Lam	September 22, 2005
Katya Santos is a sexy star, but despite her background in the industry, she still wants to do good for her family and friends. Supporting Cast: Ian Veneracion, Maybelyn Dela Cruz, Joshua Zamora, Justin De Leon, Lloyd Samartino, Jean Saburit, Tessie Villarama, Menggie Cobarrubias, Kristine Jaka, Paolo Serrano, Terence Baylon, Susan Lim, Kookie Bronoso, Krizia Daya
TBA	"Kapag Naligaw ng Landas" (The Bobbi Mercado Story)	Chynna Ortaleza	Argel Joseph	Elmer Gatchalian	September 29, 2005
This is the story of Bobbi, who comes from an affluent family and was raised by loving parents. Despite having a good life, she became addicted to drugs, which destroyed her life. Supporting Cast: Ariel Rivera, Chin-Chin Gutierrez, Dino Guevarra, Biboy Ramirez, Sid Lucero, Stella Ruiz, Gio Alvarez, Simon Soler, Princess Schuck, Edwin Serrano, Ernest Brylle Samson, Alyanna Marie Luna
TBA	"Ang Babae Sa Salamin" (The Julia Clarete Story)	Julia Clarete	Argel Joseph	Bibeth Orteza	October 6, 2005
This is the story of Julia Clarete and how she became viral as a result of an incident that occurred during a live broadcast of the variety show in which she performs. Supporting Cast: Sandy Andolong, John Regala, Melissa Mendez, Boy2 Quizon, Dion Ignacio, Isko Moreno, Mel Kimura, Rey PJ Abellana, Mark Solis, Julian Gomez, Lex Marcos
TBA	"Himig ng Tagumpay" (The Mike Garcia Story)	JC de Vera	Argel Joseph	Benedict Mique	October 13, 2005
Mike was a rising singer of his time and a finalist in the Pinoy Pop Superstar competition. Despite his growing popularity, he still has one problem: he is desperate for the love of his estranged mother. Supporting Cast: Dante Rivero, Chanda Romero, Wowie De Guzman, Gerard Madrid, Empress Schuck, Shyr Valdez, Edwin Reyes
TBA	"Paglaya Sa Anino Ng Nakaraan" (The Sharmaine Arnaiz Story)	Alessandra De Rossi	Argel Joseph	Dode Cruz	October 20, 2005
Sharmaine is known as one of the prime actresses of her time, but despite her fame, she still harbors repressed affection for her estranged father and carries the burden to this day. Supporting Cast: Elizabeth Oropesa, Jeremy Marquez, Al Tantay, Richard Quan, Abet Zialcita, Abby Abrazo
TBA	"Kapag Wala Nang Bukas" (The Carol Porio Story)	Glydel Mercado	Argel Joseph	Dode Cruz	October 27, 2005
Carol's primary wish is for a happy family, and she has a loving husband and caring children, but all of that was torn away in an instant when her husband and two children were killed in an accident. Supporting Cast: Tonton Gutierrez, Kirby De Jesus, Jake Cuenca, Ryza Cenon, Suzette Ranillo, Jan Marini, Shermaine Santiago
TBA	"Kulam" (The Samara Adajar Story)	Angelu De Leon	Argel Joseph	Benedict Mique	November 3, 2005
Samara aspires to be a nun, but fate has other plans for her when she encounters unexplained events that challenge her faith in the Lord. Supporting Cast: Bobby Andrews, Dexter Doria, Sherilyn Reyes, Rosemarie Sarita, Terio Francisco, Ronnie Martinez, Jhoana Marie Tan, Hannah Bustillos, Miguel Aguila, James Daniel Nolasco
TBA	"Paano Ba Ang Pag-Ibig?" (The Gwen Garci Story)	Gwen Garci	Argel Joseph	Adrian C. Ho	November 10, 2005
Gwen is a part of the captivating group Viva Hot Babes, but despite her colorful life in the celebrity world, she has had a lot of difficulties growing up. Supporting Cast: Leo Martinez, Ma. Isabel Lopez, Zoren Legaspi, Jake Roxas, Jordan Herrera, Simon Ibarra, Coco Martin, Joyce Ching, Jan Kimbert Ching, Martin David Delos Santos, Manolito Pi Roda
TBA	"Pangako Ng Isang Anak" (The Stella Ruiz Story)	Stella Ruiz	Argel Joseph	Benedict Mique	November 17, 2005
Everyone knows Stella as a well-known singer in the country, but she began her career as a model in Singapore. Supporting Cast: Liza Lorena, Nadine Samonte, Anton Dela Paz, Christian Vasquez, Angelina Plummer, Bobby Molina, Shiela Mae Junsay
TBA	"Higit Pa Sa Katuparan Ng Aking Mga Pangarap" (The Rizza Navales Story)	Julia Clarete	Argel Joseph	Abi Lam	November 24, 2005
Rizza comes from a poor household, but her determination and hardworking outlook have led her to success, just like any other famous singer. Supporting Cast: Raquel Montesa, Daniel Fernando, Sunshine Garcia, Krista Ranillo, Sandy Talag, Popoy Bardos, Donnie Evangelista, Maria Pamela Ovejas, Eva Vibar, Justin Rosanna, Gab Drilon, Chinggay Riego, Susan Lim
TBA	"Tinig ng Buhay" (The Faith Cuneta Story)	Ciara Sotto	Argel Joseph	Abi Lam	December 1, 2005
Everyone grew up listening to Faith Cuneta's voice in their favorite Korean dramas, and her songs have influenced many people. Supporting Cast: Rio Locsin, Rey PJ Abellana, Dindin Llarena, Jana Victoria, Girlie Sevilla, Gene Padilla, Pinky Marquez, Ira Eigenmann, Czarina De Leon, John Nite, Chris Martinez, Wilson Go, Girlie Alcantara, Justin De Leon, Dang Amistad, Andrea Gonzales, Risha Mae Manantan, Stephanie Tan, Alvin Bondoc, Christopher Clark Ison
TBA	"Sa Ngalan ng Katarungan" (The Star Witness Story)	Marvin Agustin	Argel Joseph	Elmer Gatchakian	December 8, 2005
This is the story of a 16-year old whose life was endangered as the sole eyewitness to Cebu's most infamous crime in 2001. Supporting Cast: Ernie Garcia, LJ Reyes, Michael Rivero, Marcus Madrigal, Shamaine Centenera, Jellaine Santos, Chris Martin, Tom Olivar, Jiego Malvar, Gilleth Sandico, Madeline Nicolas, Crispin Pineda, Lawrence Roxas, Virgo Antonio, Jeon Macatangay, Christopher Clark Ison
TBA	"Minsan May Isang Bata" (The Vicente "Enteng" Tagle Story)	Stephen Claude Goyong	Argel Joseph	Benedict Mique	December 15, 2005
The country is startled when the most unexpected tragedy occurs in Payatas, and a youngster becomes a hero after saving many people during the disaster. Supporting Cast: Sylvia Sanchez, Ronnie Lazaro, Isabelle de Leon, Lester Lansang, Epoy Bayubay, Mark Solis, Nanding Josef, Marky Lopez, Alvin Aragon, Michael Roy, Irma Adlawan, Dennis Marasigan, Gilleth Sandico, Sol Cruz, Antonette Garcia, Manolo Barrientos, Jhoana Marie Tan, Mariel Custodio, Bianca Pulmano, Lloyd Barredo, Alvin Bondoc
TBA	"Minsan May Isang Joey" (The Joey de Leon Story)	Keempee de Leon	Argel Joseph	Elmer Gatchalian	December 22, 2005
Jose Maria Ramos de Leon Jr., also known as Joey De Leon, was the breadwinner for his family during his college years. However, due to his difficulties as an architect student, he halted his studies to find work and support his family. This is the story about the comedian we grew up with. Supporting Cast: Epi Quizon, Jaclyn Jose, Chanda Romero, Matt Ranillo III, Francis "Iking" Magundayao, Sharmaine Santiago, Menggie Cobarrubias, Simon Ibarra, Neil Ryan Sese, Mac Duran, Jojo Bolado, Danny Magisa, Julianna Gomez, Ron Anderson, Contin Roque, Jose Napoleon Cuenca, Joey Arce

=== 2006 ===
No. in season	Title	Cast	Directed by	Written by	Original release date
TBA	"Sa Lihim ng mga Pangarap" (The Precious Lara Quigaman Story)	Precious Lara Quigaman	Argel Joseph	Abet Raz	January 5, 2006
Precious Lara Quigaman had been participating in beauty pageants due to her appealing looks and intelligence. This led her to participate in the Binibining Pilipinas 2001, but she failed to win. But, after the tragic death of her father, she persisted and joined Binibining Pilipinas in 2005. When she was crowned Miss International 2005, she not only made her family proud but also the entire country. Supporting Cast: Sandy Andolong, Joel Torre, Rita Avila, Anne Villegas, Perla Bautista, Empress Schuck, Benj Pacia, Anna David, Ella Guevara, Gabriel Roxas, Tiffany Quintos, Soffia Louise Andres, Jemimah Sabino, Martin Delos Santos
TBA	"Paghiwalayin Man Ang Landas" (The Jaycee Parker Story)	Jaycee Parker	Argel Joseph	Abet Raz	January 12, 2006
She is the daughter of the sexy celebrity Rowena Ruiz, and she followed in the footsteps of her mother by becoming a sexy actress and one of the youngest members of the group Viva Hot Babes. At the age of 20, Jaycee has already experienced numerous challenges in life, which has helped her to persevere. Supporting Cast: Jackie Lou Blanco, Lloyd Samartino, Alicia Alonzo, Charlie Davao, Danilo Barrios, Brad Turvey, Pinky Amador, Raquel Villavicencio, Chinggoy Alonzo, Tessie Villarama, Anne Vicente, Sheila Marie Rodriguez, Manny Aquino, Andrew Escobar, Angeli Delos Reyes
TBA	"Larawan ng Katapatan sa Mata ng Isang Musmos" (The Cristina "Tinay" Bugayong Story)	Isabella De Leon	Argel Joseph	Abet Raz	January 26, 2006
Cristina "Tinay" Bugayong was born and raised in a low-income family in Quezon City. She faced discrimination from her classmates and continued to help her family with whatever effort she could muster by selling snacks and meals at their school. Until an unexpected thing occurred, she discovered an envelope full of money that would eventually change their lives. Despite the temptation to keep the money, Tinay turned it over to the authorities, and her honesty earned her instant popularity and role model status. Supporting Cast: Princess Punzalan, John Arcilla, Valerie Concepcion, Sandy Talag, Terence Baylon, Mel Kimura, Jessette Prospero, Rasha Mae Manantan, John Nite, Shiela Mae Junsay, Marissa Victoria
TBA	"Nang Mangarap si Nanding" (The Fernando "Nanding" Santos Story)	Alfred Vargas	Argel Joseph	Adrian C. Ho	February 2, 2006
Fernando has had polio since he was eight months old, but it hasn't hindered him from achieving his dream of becoming a basketball player. Supporting Cast: Chanda Romero, K Brosas, January Isaac, Julio Diaz, Michael Rivero, Jade Lopez, Kiel Rodriguez, Jeon Macatangay, Boy Alano, Edlyn Tallada, Allan Noble, Conrad Leonardo, Maribel Cristobal
TBA	"Pag-iibigang Nakaukit sa Langit" (The Romnick Sarmenta and Harlene Bautista Love Story)	Carlo Aquino; Camille Prats	Argel Joseph	Dode Cruz	February 9, 2006
Romnick and Harlene both began their acting careers at an early age. Until they became part of 'That's Entertainment.' They developed feelings for one other throughout the years, and eventually decided to marry. Supporting Cast: Pen Medina, Gabby Eigenmann, Biboy Ramirez, Melissa Mendez, Encar Benedicto, Julianne Lee, Nicole Bates, Arthur Solinap, Krizia Daya, Crizel Banez, Jazz Moraide, Gail Orante
TBA	"Pagbangon Mula Sa Lusak" (The Edwin and Mae Montealegre Story)	Alessandra de Rossi; Jeremy Marquez	Argel Joseph	Dode Cruz	February 16, 2006
May is a strip club entertainer who falls in love with a police informant, but despite their different lifestyles, their love overcomes all obstacles. Supporting Cast: Maria Isabel Lopez, Ryan Eigenmann, Isabel Granada, Amy Robles, Jim Pebanco, Loriemel Quilab, Cyris Rana
TBA	(The Myra Manibog Story)	Tanya Garcia	TBA	TBA	TBA
Growing up in a poor family, Myra entered showbiz and become one of the most daring actresses during the 1980s. But despite the fame she's experiences, a hellish life would come to her. Supporting Cast:
TBA	"Abot Kamay Ang Tagumpay" (The Charmaine Piamonte Story)	Yasmien Kurdi	Argel Joseph	Abi Lam	March 2, 2006
Charmaine is a Pinoy Pop Superstar finalist, and life's trials have strengthened her will to pursue her aspirations. Supporting Cast: Tirso Cruz III, Jean Zaburit, Luz Valdez, Czarina De Leon, Jeff Agudelo, Ella Cruz, Justine Rosanna, Angel Estrada, Andrea Gonzales
TBA	"Sa Pagbubukas ng Mga Bintana" (The Daisy Reyes Story)	Daisy Reyes; Pauleen Luna	Argel Joseph	Abi Lam	March 9, 2006
Daisy will do everything to help her family, even if she receives criticism from other people. This is the story of a daughter who will risk everything for her family. Supporting Cast: Daria Ramirez, Susan Africa, Dexter Doria, Chinggoy Alonzo, Manolo Abarrientos, Erasmo Rodriguez, Joanna Marie Tan, Kokkie Bronoso, Denish Apacible, Pola
TBA	"Taginting ng Kapalaran" (The Marc Tupaz Story)	Dingdong Dantes	Argel Joseph	Abi Lam	March 16, 2006
This is the story of Mark Tupaz, the lead vocalist of the rock band Shamrock, who grew up in a wealthy family yet faced difficulties in life. Supporting Cast: Iza Calzado, Caridad Sanchez, Raquel Villavicencio, Freddie Webb, Glenda Garcia, Margaret Wilson, Gilleth Sandico, Jethro Ramirez, Jodell Stasic, Frederick Edward, Shamrock Band (Nico, Sam, Henry, Harold)
TBA	"Sa Ngalan ng Pagpapatawad" (The Charmaine Mendoza Story)	Jennylyn Mercado	Argel Joseph	Abet Raz	March 23, 2006
Charm faced a horrible life at the age of nine when her abusive father shot her mother in front of her. Supporting Cast: Nonie Buencamino, Ana Capri, Robert Arevalo, Gloria Sevilla, Jake Cuenca, Christine Mangle, Patricia Ann Roque, Sheila Marie Rodriguez, Stephanie Ann Tan, Maria Criselda Amistad, Prince Hernandez, Joseph Smisek
TBA	"Suntok sa Buwan na Pangarap" (The Jimrex Jaca Story)	Polo Ravales	Argel Joseph	Dode Cruz	March 30, 2006
Jimrex is keen to follow his dreams of being a famous boxer at an early age, despite his mother's concerns. Supporting Cast: Isabel Oli, Suzette Ranillo, Rez Cortez, Mon Confiado, Richard Quan, Maureen Mauricio, Gene Jay Rufino, Simon Pulmano, Bobby Molino
TBA	(The Father Joseph "Joey" Faller Story)	Dennis Trillo	TBA	TBA	TBA
A vehicular accident would change the life of a faithful Servant of God named Joseph Faller, who is known by many as "Father Joey". His ring finger and pinkie in his right hand would be permanently curled and was formed into a hand like Jesus Christ blessing each people. This led him to become God's instrument in saving the lives of many people. Supporting Cast:
TBA	(The Raffy Romilo Story)	Marvin Agustin	TBA	TBA	TBA
Before becoming part of That's Entertainment, Raffy Romilo had a painful childhood, that turned him to become rebellious. However, a freak accident would change his life forever. Supporting Cast:
TBA	"Suntok sa Tagumpay" (The Brian Viloria Story)	JC de Vera	Argel Joseph	Elmer Catchalian	April 20, 2006
This is the story of how boxing legend Brian Viloria achieves his dream of becoming one of the legends we know now. Supporting Cast: Gary Estrada, Bernadette Allyson, Jay Quintana, Bianca King, Pocholo Montes, Lollie Mara, Trisha Roman, Renz Valerio, Eisen Bayubay, Raul Russo
TBA	"Sa Piling ng Aking Ina" (The Aifa Medina Story)	Aifa Medina	Argel Joseph	Dode Cruz	April 27, 2006
This is the story of Aifa Medina, a dancer, and how she endured the most devastating type of pain: losing her mother. Supporting Cast: Al Tantay, Joy Cancio, Rochelle Pangilinan, Aira Bermudez, Che Che, Cynthia Yapchengco, Maria Criselda Armistad, Stephanie Ann Tan, Claro Fernandez, Roden Antonio, Sexbomb Dancers, Laurice Guillen
TBA	"Bagyo ng Pagpapala" (The Jennifer Dungol and John Paul Naco Story)	Isabelle de Leon, Nathaniel Lopez	Argel Joseph	Abi Lam-Parayno	May 4, 2006
Jennifer and John are two different children who experience hardships in life growing up but experience the same luck when they join a game show that will decide their fate. Supporting Cast: Tonton Gutierrez, Glydel Mercado, Ronnie Ricketts, Mariz Ricketts, Perla Bautista, Apreal Tolentino, Wilson Go, Marco Philip Hernandez, Charlie Zamora, Dyan Alqueta
TBA	"Kalbaryo ng Isang Ina" (The Patricia Dongallo Story)	Jean Garcia	Argel Joseph	Adrian Ho	May 11, 2006
This is the story of Peachy, a woman who puts almost everything on her children, who have caught a sickness that is preventive but cannot be cured. Supporting Cast: Gardo Versoza, Gigette Reyes, John Nite, Miguel Aguila, Downward Bautista, Robert Jude Felongco, Lawrence Roxas, Ronnie Martinez, James Nolasco
TBA	"Bayarang Puso" (The Minda Pascual Story)	Desiree del Valle	Argel Joseph	Benedict Mique	May 18, 2006
This is Mindy's narrative, in which she saves the lives of every girl who has been led astray in life after going through the same experience herself. Supporting cast: Yul Servo, Lito Pimentel, Cherry Lou, Kuhdet Honasan, Hanni Miller, Isabela Gomez, Tanya Gomez, Ella V., Matt Santiago, Virgo Antonio, Bacci Garcia, Arthur Solinap, Joseph Smisek, Juliana Gomez, Ashley Rhein Arca, Christian Matsler, Ace Gino Gaudia
TBA	"Tagumpay ng Lahi" (The Marky Cielo Story)	Marky Cielo	Argel Joseph	Benedict Mique	May 25, 2006
An architecture student, Marky dreamed of one day entering the world of showbusiness despite being an Igorot. He would later join the third season of StarStruck and become its Ultimate Male Survivor and the show's Ultimate Sole Survivor. Supporting Cast: Tetchie Agbayani, Ernie Garcia, Miguel Tanfelix, Sandy Talag, Jan Marini Alano, Zeny Zabala, Justin Rosana, Manny Tibay, St. Louis Dance Troup
TBA	"Sa Muling Pagbangon" (The Joy Sumilang Story)	Tanya Garcia	Argel Joseph	Abi Lam	June 1, 2006
Joy (Tanya Garcia) is a bold star who has experienced every setback in life, which has taught her everything she needs to know to be strong, especially for her family. Supporting Cast: Carlos Morales, Ryan Eigenmann, Maybelyn dela Cruz, Melissa Mendez, Luz Fernandez, Jr Valetin, Tony Angeles, Cris Nartinez, Gigi Locsin, Ella Cruz, Heidi Badion, Jovita Ligutan
TBA	"Ama, Anak, Kapatid, Kaibigan" (The Darius Razon Story)	Darius Razon; Dennis Trillo	Argel Joseph	Adrian Ho	June 15, 2006
Darius Razon entered showbiz as part of the '70s youth-oriented show D' Sensations and would become a jazz singer. However a series of tragedies would struck him and his family, when his two children would die a tragic death. His youngest daughter Darleen, died in a house fire. But, almost 14 years after that fateful death of Darleen, his only surviving son and actor Denver, died in a vehicular accident. Supporting Cast: Marian Rivera, Jao Mapa, Bugs Daigo, Empress Schuck, Nina Medina, Shiela Rodriguez, Kris Orosco, Susan Lim, Jimmy Morato, Mark Sapon, Mariel Pamintuan, Webster Villanueva
TBA	"Nang Mamulaklak Ang Isang Pangarap" (The Jasmine Trias Story)	Jolina Magdangal	Argel Joseph	Benedict Mique	June 22, 2006
Supporting Cast: Sandy Andolong, Mark Gil, Bianca Pulmano, Peter Christopher Turcotte, Lara Mehesa
TBA	"Tungo sa Isang Matamis na Tagumpay" (The Jackie Rice Story)	Jackie Rice	Argel Joseph	Abet Raz	June 26, 2006
This is the story of how Jackie Rice came to fame with the help of her family and how she balances her life within the spotlight. Supporting Cast: Gina Alajar, Jaime Fabregas, Marky Lopez, Meinard Lapid, Donnie Evangelista, Marky Cielo, Jana Roxas, Bugs Daigo, Arci Munoz, Chuck Allie, Vivo Ouano, Joan Santos, Jeric Rizaldo, Antonio Marquez, Angelina Plummer, Joana Padua, Nikko Castillo, Jheddie Mendoza, Jason Cuvinar, Gene Rufino
TBA	"Sa Likod Ng Tagumpay" (The Gerald Santos Story)	Gerald Santos	Argel Joseph	Dode Cruz	July 6, 2006
Gerald (Himself), who grew up in a low-income family, aspired to enhance his family's circumstances. He would compete in the second season of Pinoy Pop Superstar and become the grand champion. Supporting Cast: Hilda Koronel, Juan Rodrigo, Benj Pacia, Jj Zamora, Josie Marie Ora, Nico Arca, Rowie Zamora, Lorraine Timbol
TBA	"Muling Babangon ang Pag-asa" (The Irenea Velasco And Arlene Ibanez Story)	Tessie Tomas; Iza Calzado	Argel Joseph	Abet Raz	July 13, 2006
This is the story of Irenea Velasco and Arlene Ibanez and how the Leyte tragedy claimed the lives of their loved ones in a single night. Supporting Cast: Nanding Josef, Neil Ryan Sese, Anton Bernardo, Ping Medina, Patricia Ann Roque, Jeon Macatangay, Sol Cruz
TBA	"Tagumpay Sa Kabila Ng Kahinaan" (The Gian Carlos Story)	Gian Carlos	Argel Joseph	Dode Cruz	July 27, 2006
This is the story of Gian Carlos and how he overcame life's challenges despite having an incurable disease since birth. Supporting Cast: Gloria Sevilla, Chanda Romero, Louella De Cordova, Rey PJ Abellana, Bing Davao, Earl Paas, Marky Cielo, Jana Roxas, Chuck Allie, Bugs Daigo, Vivo Ouano, Vaness del Moral, Johan Santos, Reah Nakpil, Sarah Larson
TBA	"Luha Sa Likod Ng Mga Pangarap" (The Ella V. Story)	Ella V.	Argel Joseph	Abet Raz	August 3, 2006
Supporting Cast: John Regala, Maria Isabel Lopez, Maureen Mauricio, Kirby De Jesus, John Medina, Abet Zialcita, Shiela Marie Rodriguez, Justine Villacrusis, John Paul Lanot
TBA	"Muling Sumilang ang Pag-ibig" (The Patricia Javier Story 2)	Patricia Javier	Argel Joseph	Benedict Mique	August 2006
This is the continuation of Patricia Javier's story, and how she ended up in a difficult circumstance because she loved the wrong person. Supporting Cast: Chanda Romero, KC Montero, Jake Roxas, Ann Villegas, Simon Ibarra, Edwin Reyes, Arlene Gonzales, Johnbee Bautista
TBA	"Hindi Ako Mahihiya" (The Alyssa Alano Story)	Alyssa Alano	Argel Joseph	Dode Cruz	August 31, 2006
This is the story of Alyssa Alano and how she rose to fame because of her humorous rendition of the song 'Kiss Me.' Supporting Cast: Melissa Mendez, Valerie Concepcion, Dion Ignacio, Philip Lazaro, Menggie Cobarubias, Abet Zialcita, Ella Cruz, Nicole Dulalia, Lindsay Kennedy, Jessie Catimoy, Celia Rodriguez
TBA	"Nang Minsang Magtanong ang Puso" (The Asia Agcaoili Story)	Asia Agcaoili	Argel Joseph	Real Florido; Adrian Ho	September 7, 2006
She was known as one of the most daring actresses of the early to mid-2000s and a member of Viva Hot Babes. But who is Asia Agcaoili in real life? Supporting Cast: Tetchie Agbayani, Gary Estrada, Ian Veneracion, Daniel Fernando, Jake Cuenca, Margaret Wilson, Andrew Wolff, Shiela Marie Rodriguez, Ken Punzalan, Lyn Tamayo
TBA	"Sa Dulo Ng Pag-Ibig" (The Olivia Ortiz Story)	Pauleen Luna	Argel Joseph	Benedict Mique	September 14, 2006
This is the story of Oliva Ortiz, a famous bold star, and how she overcame adult challenges at such a young age. Supporting Cast: Alfred Vargas, Wendell Ramos, Antonio Aquitania, JC De Vera, Raquel Villavicencio, Raquel Monteza, Robert Magisa
TBA	"Pagbangon Ng Isang Pangarap" (The Iwa Moto Story)	Iwa Moto	Argel Joseph	Benedict Mique	September 21, 2006
Iwa Moto became famous not only because of her unique name but also because of her unique story about how her journey on Starstruck started. Supporting Cast: Cherry Pie Picache, Dan Fernandez, Lloyd Samartino, Ic Mendoza, Hyca Bunavacz, Joyce Ching, Yumi Loseo, Yason Loseo
TBA	"Hiram Na Haplos" (The Jimmy And Cora Salalima Story)	Lorna Tolentino; Rudy Fernandez	Argel Joseph	Dode Cruz	October 2006
This is the story of Jimmy And Cora, a husband and wife who promote the cause of foster parenting and have fostered many children throughout their lives. Supporting Cast: Miguel Tanfelix, Suzette Ranillo, Sandy Talag, Rea Nakpil, Vaness del Moral, Renz Juan, Rosemarie Sarita, Issa Beltran
TBA	"Pinagpapala Ang Mga Tumutulong" (The Naga Family Story)	Phillip Salvador	Argel Joseph	Abi Lam	October 12, 2006
This is the story of the heroism of a family who saved the lives of the passengers of an aircraft that crashed near Manila Bay. Supporting Cast: Joko Diaz, Alma Concepcion, Aileen Luna, Tom Olivar, Bryan Homicillo, Angelo Ilagan, Girlie Alcantara, Webster Valenzuela, Rado Peru, Aurel Ayson, Jose Napoleon Cuenca
TBA	"Pag-Ahon Mula Sa Putikan" (The Shine Mariquit Story)	Joyce Jimenez	Argel Joseph	Unknown	October 19, 2006
Supporting Cast: Alicia Alonzo, Michael De Mesa, Carmi Martin, Encar Benedicto, Gian Carlo, and Dang Amistad
TBA	"Ang Muling Pagharap sa Bukas" (The Pinong Lagari Story)	Bearwin Meily	Argel Joseph	Abi Lam	October 26, 2006
This is the story of Pinong and how he rose to fame as a voice talent as Pinong of Love Radio, the voice behind 'Kadyot Lang' and other Love Radio microphone bloopers. Supporting Cast: K Brosas, Tommy Tambay, Sexy Terry, Rey Porter, Dyan Alguer, Thalassa Elizalde
TBA	"Sa Pagbuhos ng Unos" (The Estrella Family Story)	Joel Torre, Cherry Pie Picache	Argel Joseph	Unknown	November 9, 2006
This is the story of Gerardo and Thelma, how they raised their children with special needs, and how they faced the judgement of other people. Supporting Cast: Angelo Ilagan, Martin Delos Santos, Susan Lemon, Renford Alano, Julius Gomez, Joshua Burac, Michael Pequit, Susan Robles-Tongco, Chiqui Del Carmen
TBA	"Sa Kabila ng Pagsubok" (The James Bruma Story)	Marvin Agustin	Argel Joseph	Unknown	November 16, 2006
This is the story of James, who got obsessed with drugs and changed his life for the better. Supporting Cast: Pauleen Luna, Eva Darren, Nanding Josef, Raul Russo, Tessie Villarama, Crispin Pineda, Abet Zialcita, Neil Ryan Sese, Freddie Garcia, Virgo Antonio
TBA	"Liyab ng Pag-asa" (The Teresa Hortelano Story)	Gina Alajar	Argel Joseph	Unknown	November 23, 2006
This is the story of a family that lost five of their children in an unexpected fire in their neighborhood. How will they confront and overcome the nightmare of their new reality? Supporting Cast: Tirso Cruz III, Criselda Volks, Glaiza de Castro, Sheena Halili, Joanna Marie Tan, Jeon Macatangay, Nikko Arca, Daniel Gulla
TBA	"Laro na Tadhana" (The Carmelita Mendoza Story)	Sandy Andolong	Unknown	Unknown	November 30, 2006
This is the story of Carmelita and how her two children, separated from birth, eventually became lovers. Supporting Cast: Jennylyn Mercado, Jeremy Marquez, Anne Villegas, Charlie Davao, Luz Fernandez, Rosemarie Sarita, Simon Ibarra
TBA	(The Ray Agpawa Story)	Alfred Vargas	TBA	TBA	TBA
Supporting Cast: Diana Zubiri, Archie Adamos, Justin de Leon, John Medina, Idda Yaneza, Raul Russo, Jay Jay Zamora, Gilleth Sandico, Josef Marcelo, Jesseth Prospero, Gigi Locsin
TBA	"Hating Kapatid sa Pag-ibig" (The Ellen and Julia Alfonso Story)	Mylene Dizon, Jay Manalo	Argel Joseph	Unknown	December 14, 2006
This is the story of two sibling who fell in love with the same man and shared him in the same roof. Supporting Cast: Danica Sotto, Dexter Doria, Menggie Cobarrubias, Justin De Leon
TBA	"Iisang Puno, Magkaibang Bunga" (The Sinforoso Sisters Story)	Nadine Samonte, Yasmien Kurdi	Argel Joseph	Unknown	December 21, 2006
This is the story of two siblings who are different in their physical appearance and lived a different life. Supporting Cast: Rez Cortez, Sylvia Sanchez, Perla Bautista, Eunice Laguslad, Jolina Mare Reyes, Brian Homicillo, Kris Martinez, Webster Valenzuela, Antonio Marquez, Christian Burke, John Paul Lanot
TBA	"Kapag Pag-ibig ay Wagas" (The Robin Estacio Story)	Alfred Vargas	Unknown	Unknown	December 27, 2006
This is the story of a man with an intellectual disability who, after seeing the horrific fate that befell his friend, became an eyewitness to the crime. Supporting Cast: LJ Reyes, Jaclyn Jose, Matt Ranillo, Irma Adlawan, Mon Confiado, Augusto Victa, Esther Chavez, Simon Ibarra, Mario Magalona, Tom Olivar, Josef Marcelo, Paul Salas, Sandy Talag, Gabriel Roxas

=== 2007 ===
No. in season	Title	Cast	Directed by	Written by	Original release date
1	"Kapag Naglaho ang Gunita"	Snooky Serna	Unknown	Unknown	January 4, 2007
This is the story of a woman who suddenly experiences memory loss at a young age, losing all her capabilities to be on her own. Supporting Cast: Gary Estrada, Eva Darren, Mel Kimura, John Nite, Jessette Prospero, Eleuterio Francisco, Sweet Ramos, Ana Marie Tablizo
2	"Kamaong Bulaklak" (The Noel Sumingwa Story)	Patrick Garcia	Argel Joseph	Dode Cruz	January 18, 2007
This is the story of a closeted gay man, Noel who is continuously fighting for who he wants to be against the judgment of others and his homophobic father. Supporting Cast: Tetchie Agbayani, Bembol Roco, Archie Adamos, Gio Alvarez, Justin De Leon, Michael Roy Jornales, Simon Ibarra, Piuo Jun Hidalgo, Richard Lim
3	"Anghel sa Lupa" (The Angela Marie Chua Story)	Angel Chua	Argel Joseph	Unknown	January 25, 2007
This is the story of Angela Marie Chua, a woman who relentlessly battles her bone disease, osteogenesis imperfecta, a rare genetic condition that causes bones to break easily, often with little to no apparent cause of injury. Supporting Cast: Gina Pareno, Leo Martinez, Luz Fernandez, Sheena Halili, Ida Ynares, John Medina, Coco Martin, Girlie Alcantara, Joyce Ching, Julianna Gomez, George Lim, Sharon Clair Sison
4	"Gaano Kailap ang Katarungan?" (The Analyn Villanueva Story)	Rufa Mae Quinto	Unknown	Unknown	February 1, 2007
This is the story of Analyn, a mentally challenged teenager who suffered sexual abuse from her father’s best friend. Supporting Cast: Dante Rivero, Elizabeth Oropesa, Pen Medina, Glaiza de Castro, Anne Villegas, Je Sison
TBA	"Paano Ba Ang Maging Ina?" (The Rebecca Escobar Story)	Iza Calzado	Argel Joseph	Dode Cruz	February 8, 2007
This is the story of a woman who uses her body to earn money for her sick brother and helps a couple who are struggling to have a baby. Supporting cast: Gardo Versoza, Lotlot De Leon, Gerlie Sevilla, Deborah Sun
TBA	"Munting Kagat, Dambuhalang Sugat" (The Igmidio Alcones Story)	Jinggoy Estrada	Argel Joseph	Adrian Ho	February 15, 2007
This is the story of a man who contracted filariasis but was too stubborn to seek medical help. Supporting cast: Diana Zubiri, Menggie Cobarrubias, Richard Quan, Jojo Bolado, Sweet Ramos, Tony Angeles, Raul Rosso
TBA	"Ang Batang Di Tumatanda" (The Rochelle Pondare Story)	Sam Bumatay	Argel Joseph	Benedict Mique	February 22, 2007
This is the story of a child who is aging faster than usual and how she spent her remaining years with her condition. Supporting cast: Rita Avila, Pocholo Montes, Nonie Buencamino, Raquel Montesa
TBA	"Ibulong Mo Sa Hangin" (The Liza Dela Cruz Story)	Alessandra De Rossi	Argel Joseph	Unknown	March 1, 2007
This is the story of a mute woman who was attacked by the person she believed loved her, along with the friend who turned their back on her. Supporting cast: Desiree del Valle, Maria Isabel Lopez, Antonio Aquitania, Viviene Dela Cruz
TBA	"Silang Mga Anak ng Araw" (The Marquez Family Story)	Rommel Padilla, Cherry Pie Picache	Argel Joseph	Adrian Ho	March 8, 2007
This is the story of five children who have albinism, an inherited condition that causes to them to have very light skin, hair, and eyes, and how they face criticism from people who are unaware of their condition. Supporting cast: Ralph Padilla, Tessie Villarama, Jodell Stasic, Grace Imperial, Kyle Palen, Angelina Plumer
TBA	"Mula sa Pilat ng Kahapon" (The Mina Idao Story)	Jean Garcia	Argel Joseph	Abet Raz	March 15, 2007
This is the story of a woman who experienced two failed relationships, one of which almost ended up killing her. Supporting cast: Victor Neri, Ian de Leon, Sheena Halili, Melissa Mendez, Renford Alano, Joy Sunga, Benj Pacia
TBA	"Walang Kapantay Na Pag-Ibig" (The Edward and Sheryl Vitto Love Story)	Pauleen Luna, Mura Padua	Argel Joseph	Unknown	March 22, 2007
This is the story of a man with dwarfism and how he met the woman who will accept him for who he is. Supporting cast:
TBA	"Pira-pirasong Pagsubok" (The Cancer Survivors Story)	Lorna Tolentino	Unknown	Unknown	April 6, 2007
Supporting cast: Allan Paule, Lucita Soriano, Kirby de Jesus, Joanna Marie Tan, Roshan Guevarra, Andrew de Real
TBA	"Sa Ating Muling Pagkikita" (The Deanon Twins Story)	Dominique Roco, Felix Roco	Argel Joseph	Unknown	April 12, 2007
This is the story of twin siblings who got separated. Will they be able to find each other again? Supporting cast: Andy Andolong, Rio Locsin, Bembol Roco, Ernie Garcia
TBA	"Ang Buhay Sa Kahihiya't Laman" (The Ronald and Elaine Dela Vera Story)	Alfred Vargas, Katrina Halili	Jun Lana	Benedict Mique	April 19, 2007
This is the story of two sex workers who fell in love, became parents, and were forced to sell out their dignity in order to save their baby's life. Supporting cast: Gigeth Reyes, Paolo Serrano, Bacci, Soliman Cruz, Menggie Cobarrubias
TBA	"Kahit Pa Magunaw ang Mundo" (The Elizabeth Galido Story)	Manilyn Reynes	Argel Joseph	Dode Cruz	May 3, 2007
This is the story of a woman who lost her entire family in the 1990 earthquake that shook the country. Supporting cast: Ramon Christopher, Sheila Marie Rodriguez, Alicia Alonzo, Sweet Ramos
TBA	"Sa Tugatog ng Kagandahan" (The Gloria Diaz Story)	Maggie Wilson	Argel Joseph	Elmer Gatchalian	May 10, 2007
Gloria brought pride to the Philippines when she became the first Filipino to be crowned as Miss Universe 1969. But, after winning the crown, different struggles came to her. Supporting Cast: Polo Ravales, Baron Geisler, Raquel Villavicencio, Gilleth Sandico, Bing Davao, Mel Martinez, Aiza Espino, Paul Laceda
TBA	"Medalya Ng Mga Pangarap" (The Elma Muros Story)	Jennylyn Mercado	Argel Joseph	Abet Raz	May 17, 2007
This is the story of the ‘Long Jump Queen’ of the Philippines, Elma Muros, and how she achieved her dreams despite having setbacks in life. Supporting Cast: Mark Anthony Fernandez, Chanda Romero, Karen Delos Reyes, Soliman Cruz, Adwin Reyes
TBA	"Dugo ng Buhay" (The Rosa Rosal Story)	Rosa Rosal; Iza Calzado (as young Rosa)	Argel Joseph	Benedict Mique	May 24, 2007
Rosa Rosal became one of the most sought-after leading ladies during the post-war era. She became known for some films such as Anak Dalita and Biyaya ng Lupa. However, she decided to give up her career and dedicated her life to public service when she became a volunteer of the Philippine Red Cross. Supporting Cast: Mark Gil, Pinky Marquez, Tom Olivar, Crispin Pineda, Lawrence Roxas, Rita Carlos, Joy Folloso, Rainier Pamintuan, Reynaldo Ucat, Robert Carreon
TBA	"Kahit Di Ako Mestiza" (The Caridad Sanchez Story)	Pauleen Luna	Unknown	Unknown	May 31, 2007
In Philippine showbiz, where only fair-skinned women are accepted, Caridad, a Cebuana broke the barrier. She would become an award-winning actress in the entertainment industry. Supporting Cast: Mart Escudero, Sunshine Garcia, Marky Cielo, Tommy Abuel, Ces Quesada, Cathay Arguelles
TBA	"Isang Bahay, Dalawang Maybahay" (The Melanie Avila Story)	Valerie Concepcion	Argel Joseph	Benedict Mique	June 7, 2007
This is a story of the blind man, Cocoy, who is living with two women under one roof: his wife, Julie and his mistress, Melanie. Supporting Cast: Sunshine Dizon, Romnick Sarmienta, Simon Soler, Patricia Ann Roque, Raul Russo, Wilson Go, Danny Magisa
TBA	"Sa Muling Pag-Ahon" (The Allan James Rafael Story)	Ryan Eigenmann	Unknown	Unknown	June 14, 2007
This is a story of a good man, Allan, who got into an accident that left him brain-dead and paralyzed for a few months. Can he still live a good life despite his injuries? Supporting cast: Gina Alajar, Michael de Mesa, Alessandra De Rossi, Ira Eigenmann, Mymy Davao, Bart Guingona, Gian Carlo Serrano
TBA	"Pag-ibig sa Kabila ng Kapansanan" (The Rose and Rex Tuazon Story)	Dennis Trillo, Rochelle Pangilinan	Argel Joseph	Dode Cruz	June 21, 2007
This is a story of a man with cerebral palsy and an amazing woman who taught him that love exists beyond all flaws and sickness Supporting cast: Paulo Avelino, Robert Villar, Ida Yaneza, Deborah Sun, Diana Malatag, Antonnette Garcia
TBA	"Sa Piling ng Mailap na Pag-asa" (The Edgardo Canaleza Story)	Aubrey Miles	Unknown	Unknown	June 28, 2007
This is a story of a man who lost his family in the Bocaue Pagoda Festival and had to live in the streets for a few years after refusing to move on. Supporting cast: Yul Servo, Jelaine Santos
TBA	"Ang Kambal na Kapalaran" (The Tony and John Cabanlig Story)	Pekto, John Feir	Argel Joseph	Abet Raz	July 19, 2007
This is the story of conjoined twins who face hardship growing up because of their condition. Supporting cast: Chanda Romero, Richard Quan, Juan Rodrigo, Dido Dela Cruz, Martin Del Rosario, Robert Villar, Carlito Caayos Jr. Renee Lascuna, Reynaldo Bejar
TBA	"Nang Umibig si Neneng Kuba" (The Luisa “Neneng” Lopez Story)	Jennylyn Mercado	Argel Joseph	TBA	TBA
Supporting Cast: Mark Herras, Gladys Reyes, Chynna Ortaleza, Allan Paule, Vaness del Moral, Maita Soriano, John Apacible
TBA	"Nang Sumagot ang Langit" (The Bonifacio Lenes Story)	JC de Vera	TBA	TBA	TBA
“Nang Sumagot ang Langit” tells the story of boxer Bonifacio Lenes and how a reality game show changed his life. Bonifacio knows how much passion and dreams can take from a person's life, but he never failed to follow his dreams. A struggling boxer, he pursued his passion with energy that was unseen in his comrades. And though life wasn't kind to him in the city, it never stopped him from believing that all good things come to those who wait. Supporting Cast: Yasmien Kurdi, Pen Medina, Dexter Doria, Dick Israel, Deborah Sun, Ernie Garcia, Patricia Anne Roque, Tom Olivar, Antonette Garcia
TBA	"Mana sa Ama" (The Merlu Acunan Story)	Pauleen Luna	Unknown	Unknown	December 27, 2007
Mel Tiangco tells the story of Merlu Acunan, a child whose only wish was to be accepted for who she was, and not for the color of her skin. But with the arrival of a man who she thought would change her life, something more unfortunate happens to her. Follow the life of Merlu, as she goes from being unwanted to a rape victim, and find out how she was able to live through life's challenges. Supporting Cast: Rio Locsin, Boboy Garrovillo, Gabby Eigenmann, Marcus Madrigal, Susan Lim, Christian Burke
