= Samuel Duran =

Filipino boxer

Personal information
- Nickname: Sammy
- Nationality: Filipino
- Born: Samuel Duran; 1 September 1968 (age 58) Dangcagan, Bukidnon, Philippines
- Height: 5 ft 10 in (1.78 m)
- Weight: Super featherweight

Boxing career
- Stance: Orthodox

Boxing record
- Total fights: 101
- Wins: 72
- Win by KO: 35
- Losses: 27
- Draws: 2

Samuel Duran (born September 1, 1968, in Dangcagan, Bukidnon, Northern Mindanao, Philippines) is a Filipino former professional boxer.

== Professional career ==
Samuel Duran made his professional debut on September 29, 1990, coming out triumphant for KO in the 5th round by a match against Thai Saming Kiatpech. After losing the next three matches, he began a series of consecutive victories, including a win against young Gerry Peñalosa (19-0-1). He was the first boxer to beat the former World Champion Gerry Penalosa. He is now an assistant trainer at Pacquiao's Gym in General Santos City.

Duran was a former Philippine Games and Amusement Board Featherweight Champion in 2002. He was a Philippine Boxing Federation Featherweight Champion in 2001. He was also an OPBF Featherweight Title holder in 1997 against Singnum Chuwatana and former PABA Bantamweight Champion and World Boxing Council International Bantamweight Champion.

== Professional boxing record ==
101 fights	72 wins	27 losses
By knockout	35	12
By decision	37	14
By disqualification	0	1
Draws	2	

No.	Result	Record	Opponent	Type	Round, time	Date	Location	Notes
101	Loss	72–27–10	Jimrex Jaca	TKO	2 (12), 2:44	25 Nov 2005	Maasin City Sports Complex (Maasin City Gym), Maasin, Philippines	For vacant GAB super featherweight title
100	Win	72–26–10	Benjie Cañete	UD	8	25 Aug 2005	Valencia, Bukidnon, Philippines	
99	Loss	71–26–2	Terdsak Kokietgym	KO	4 (12)	4 Oct 2004	Nakhon Ratchasima, Nakhon Ratchasima Province, Thailand	For WBO Asia Pacific featherweight title
98	Loss	71–25–2	Noriyuki Nakata	UD	10	7 May 2004	Bunka Gym, Yokohama, Japan	
97	Win	71–24–2	Julius Tarona	UD	8	23 Dec 2003	Valencia City Gymnasium, Valencia, Philippines	
96	Loss	70–24–2	Bert Abapo	DQ	8 (10), 2:40	19 Jan 2003	Gaisano Country Mall Parking Lot, Cebu City, Philippines	
95	Loss	70–23–2	Ibrahim Aroby	PTS	10	5 Oct 2002	Jakarta, Indonesia	
94	Loss	70–22–2	Jeffrey Onate	PTS	12	17 Aug 2002	Iba Sports Complex, Iba, Philippines	Lost GAB featherweight title
93	Loss	70–21–2	Chi In-jin	KO	3 (10), 3:07	30 Mar 2002	Guro Highschool, Seoul, South Korea	
92	Win	70–20–2	Baby Lorona Jr.	SD	12	22 Dec 2001	Bren Z. Guiao Convention Center, San Fernando, Philippines	Won GAB featherweight title
91	Win	69–20–2	Joemar Damosmog	TKO	8 (12)	9 Nov 2001	Festival Mall, Muntinlupa, Philippines	Won vacant PBF featherweight title
90	Win	68–20–2	Laberto Peliño	TKO	5	18 Oct 2001	Barangay Tongantongan, Valencia, Philippines	
89	Win	67–20–2	Jeffrey Onate	TKO	8	19 Aug 2001	Valencia, Bukidnon, Philippines	
88	Win	66–20–2	Isagani Pumar	TKO	8	1 Jun 2001	Barangay Lahug, Cebu City, Philippines	
87	Win	65–20–2	Bert Navarez	PTS	10	27 Apr 2001	Philippines	
86	Win	64–20–2	Dechdamrong Pormuangsurin	PTS	10	8 Apr 2001	Valencia, Bukidnon, Philippines	
85	Win	63–20–2	Felipe Longakit	TKO	9	16 Feb 2001	Gold City Coliseum, Cagayan de Oro, Philippines	
84	Win	62–20–2	Joebar Damosmog	KO	8	20 Dec 2000	Philippines	
83	Win	61–20–2	Loon Pantasi	PTS	8	3 Nov 2000	Lopburi, Lopburi Province, Thailand	
82	Win	60–20–2	Edward Escriber	TD	4 (10)	19 Sep 2000	Teresa, Rizal, Philippines	
81	Loss	59–20–2	Roongsurin Lookongchan	PTS	10	21 Jun 1991	Bangkok, Thailand	
80	Win	59–19–2	Ariel Loyloy	TKO	6	6 May 2000	Philippines	
79	Loss	58–19–2	Choe Chol-su	KO	2 (12)	22 Aug 1999	Shenyang, Liaoning, China	
78	Loss	58–18–2	Jerry Quiñones	KO	3	19 Dec 1998	Philippines	
77	Win	58–17–2	Fernando Montilla	UD	10	22 Aug 1998	Tagum, Davao del Norte, Philippines	
76	Loss	57–17–2	Takeo Imaoka	MD	12	13 Jul 1998	Korakuen Hall, Tokyo, Japan	For OPBF featherweight title
75	Win	57–16–2	Jimmy Laping	KO	1	15 Mar 1998	Bacolod, Valencia, Philippines	
74	Loss	56–16–2	Takeo Imaoka	UD	12	12 Nov 1997	Korakuen Hall, Tokyo, Japan	Lost OPBF featherweight title
73	Win	56–15–2	Jonathan Mercado	TKO	8	3 Aug 1997	Valencia, Bukidnon, Philippines	
72	Win	55–15–2	Singnum Chuwatana	PTS	12	17 May 1997	Luneta Park, Manila, Philippines	Won vacant OPBF featherweight title
71	Win	54–15–2	Ariel Neri	PTS	10	2 Feb 1997	Bacolod, Valencia, Philippines	
70	Loss	53–15–2	Koji Matsumoto	KO	8 (12), 2:07	5 Nov 1996	Korakuen Hall, Tokyo, Japan	Lost OPBF featherweight title
69	Win	53–14–2	Noboru Hirase	TKO	6 (12), 2:45	31 Aug 1996	Lipa City Youth Cultural Center, Lipa, Philippines	Retained OPBF featherweight title
68	Win	52–14–2	Park Yong-woon	PTS	12	6 Jun 1996	South Korea	Won vacant OPBF bantamweight title
67	Win	51–14–2	Sonrit Sithsurasakgym	KO	1 (10), 1:31	30 Mar 1996	Mandaluyong City Sports Complex, Mandaluyong, Philippines	
66	Win	50–14–2	Lito Gonzaga	PTS	10	3 Mar 1996	Philippines	
65	Win	49–14–2	Ulyses Puzon	UD	12	20 Jan 1996	Ninoy Aquino Stadium, Manila, Philippines	Retained GAB featherweight title
64	Draw	48–14–2	Virgilio Openo	TD	7 (12)	28 Oct 1995	Philippines	Retained GAB featherweight title
63	Win	48–14–1	Chatchai Lookmingkwan	KO	2 (10)	8 Jul 1995	Araneta Center, Quezon City, Philippines	
62	Win	47–14–1	Ric Ramirez	TKO	5 (12)	21 May 1995	Philippines	Retained GAB featherweight tirle
61	Loss	46–14–1	Park Yong-woon	KO	2 (10)	1 Apr 1995	Jinju Gymnasium, Jinju, South Korea	
60	Win	46–13–1	Style Adigue	TKO	9 (12)	4 Feb 1995	Mandaluyong, Metro Manila, Philippines	Retained GAB featherweight title
59	Win	45–13–1	Nick Enero	UD	12	4 Dec 1994	Valencia, Bukidnon, Philippines	Won GAB featherweight title
58	Win	44–13–1	Ichiya Ishiyama	TKO	3 (10), 1:28	16 Aug 1994	Prefectural Gymnasium, Osaka, Japan	
57	Win	43–13–1	Marlon Arlos	TKO	8 (10), 0:49	3 Jun 1994	Cuneta Astrodome, Pasay, Philippines	
56	Loss	42–13–1	Jess Maca	PTS	12	29 Apr 1994	Cagayan de Oro, Misamis Oriental, Philippines	Lost GAB bantamweight title
55	Loss	42–12–1	Hiroaki Yokota	KO	7 (10), 1:42	4 Mar 1994	Korakuen Hall, Tokyo, Japan	
54	Win	42–11–1	Arnuldo Indat	PTS	10	13 Feb 1994	Philippines	
53	Loss	41–11–1	Chalarm Por Pongsawang	PTS	10	26 Dec 1993	Rangsit, Pathum Thani Province, Thailand	
52	Win	41–10–1	Vic Galme	TKO	8 (12)	15 Oct 1993	Cavite Coliseum, Bacoor, Philippines	Retained GAB bantamweight title
51	Win	40–10–1	Alberto Peliño	TKO	7	22 Aug 1993	Valencia, Bukidnon, Philippines	
50	Loss	39–10–1	Junai Ramayana	TKO	7	11 Jul 1993	Bandar Lampung, Lampung, Indonesia	
49	Loss	39–9–1	Lee Yong-hoon	PTS	10	7 Mar 1993	Chungmu Gymnasium, Daejeon, South Korea	
48	Win	39–8–1	Jonas Torregoza	TKO	7 (12)	7 Feb 1993	Bukidnon, Philippines	Retained GAB bantamweight title
47	Win	38–8–1	Roger Quisaba	KO	3	15 Jan 1993	Dangcagan, Bukidnon, Philippines	
46	Win	37–8–1	Ernesto Urdaniza	KO	1	25 Oct 1992	Bacolod, Valencia, Philippines	
45	Loss	36–8–1	Orlando Canizales	UD	12	18 Sep 1992	Brick Breeden Fieldhouse, Bozeman, Montana, U.S.	For IBF bantamweight title
44	Win	36–7–1	Dodong Virtuzado	PTS	10	23 Aug 1992	Valencia, Bukidnon, Philippines	
43	Win	35–7–1	Gerry Peñalosa	SD	12	1 Aug 1992	Cebu Coliseum, Cebu City, Philippines	Retained GAB bantamweight title
42	Win	34–7–1	Jun Cardinal	KO	9	8 May 1992	Rizal Memorial Sports Complex, Manila, Philippines	Retained GAB bantamweight title
41	Win	33–7–1	Flash Romanos	TKO	3	12 Apr 1992	Bacolod, Valencia, Philippines	
40	Win	32–7–1	Rey Paciones	PTS	10	22 Feb 1992	General Santos, Cotabato del Sur, Philippines	
39	Win	31–7–1	Danny Ortega	TKO	7	19 Jan 1992	Valencia, Bukidnon, Philippines	
38	Win	30–7–1	Rod Naiconi	PTS	12	6 Dec 1991	Feliciano, Ozamiz, Philippines	Retained GAB bantamweight title
37	Win	29–7–1	Oley Kiatoneway	KO	6	5 Nov 1991	Bangkok, Thailand	
36	Win	28–7–1	Ronnie Romero	KO	2 (12)	25 Aug 1991	Davao City, Davao del Sur, Philippines	Won vacant GAB bantamweight title
35	Win	27–7–1	Erning Tinoy	TKO	6	21 Jul 1991	Bukidnon, Philippines	
34	Win	26–7–1	Mario Sumalinog	PTS	10	28 Apr 1991	Bukidnon, Philippines	
33	Win	25–7–1	Felix Sala	TKO	3	23 Feb 1991	Davao City, Davao del Sur, Philippines	
32	Win	24–7–1	Nelson Harada Cabig	SD	10	19 Jan 1991	Almendras Gym, Davao City, Philippines	
31	Win	23–7–1	Ramil Austria	PTS	10	23 Dec 1990	Manila, Metro Manila, Philippines	
30	Win	22–7–1	Pat Bracero	PTS	10	4 Nov 1990	Manila, Metro Manila, Philippines	
29	Loss	21–7–1	Donnie Hood	SD	12	9 Oct 1990	Kelvin Hall, Glasgow, Scotland	Lost WBC International bantamweight title
28	Loss	21–6–1	Virgilio Openo	UD	12	14 Sep 1990	Rizal Memorial Coliseum, Manila, Philippines	
27	Loss	21–5–1	Joichiro Tatsuyoshi	KO	7 (10), 2:10	28 Jun 1990	Prefectural Gymnasium, Osaka, Japan	
26	Win	21–4–1	Saming Kiatpetch	KO	5 (12)	24 Mar 1990	Pattaya, Chonburi Province, Thailand	Won WBC International bantamweight title
25	Loss	20–4–1	Loremer Pontino	MD	12	11 Feb 1990	Bacolod, Negros Occidental, Philippines	For GAB bantamweight title
24	Win	20–3–1	Ruel Idombingo	PTS	10	24 Dec 1989	Bukidnon, Philippines	
23	Win	19–3–1	Roger Vicera	UD	10	19 Nov 1989	Valencia, Bukidnon, Philippines	
22	Win	18–3–1	Bonnie Balientos	TKO	7	22 Oct 1989	Mambajao, Camiguin, Philippines	
21	Win	17–3–1	Rey Tibayan	PTS	10	27 Aug 1989	Bukidnon, Philippines	
20	Win	16–3–1	Danny Crisostomo	PTS	10	16 Jul 1989	Bukidnon, Philippines	
19	Win	15–3–1	Pepito Semblante	TKO	5	24 Jun 1989	Davao City, Davao del Sur, Philippines	
18	Win	14–3–1	Eldie Paradero	TKO	4	21 May 1989	Lanao del Sur, Philippines	
17	Loss	13–3–1	Erning Tinoy	PTS	10	7 May 1989	Davao City, Davao del Sur, Philippines	
16	Win	13–2–1	Jun Edward	PTS	10	30 Apr 1989	Lanao del Sur, Philippines	
15	Loss	12–2–1	Nelson Harada Cabig	TKO	8	1 Apr 1989	Bukidnon, Philippines	
14	Win	12–1–1	Jun Generale	TKO	9	12 Feb 1989	Bukidnon, Philippines	
13	Win	11–1–1	Bonnie Balientes	PTS	10	22 Jan 1989	Camiguin, Philippines	
12	Win	10–1–1	Joel Castrodes	PTS	10	29 Dec 1988	Davao City, Davao del Sur, Philippines	
11	Win	9–1–1	Eldie Paradero	PTS	10	8 Dec 1998	Ozamiz, Misamis Occidental, Philippines	
10	Win	8–1–1	Bonnie Balientos	PTS	10	20 Oct 1988	Valencia, Bukidnon, Philippines	
9	Loss	7–1–1	Bonnie Balientos	KO	2	14 Aug 1988	Valencia, Bukidnon, Philippines	
8	Win	7–0–1	Bernie Herra	PTS	10	31 Jul 1988	Valencia, Bukidnon, Philippines	
7	Win	6–0–1	Nelson Yacapin	PTS	10	25 Jun 1988	Valencia, Bukidnon, Philippines	
6	Win	5–0–1	Allan Inguito	TKO	8 (10)	22 May 1988	Bukidnon, Philippines	
5	Win	4–0–1	Boy Ansongay	PTS	8	27 Mar 1988	Bukidnon, Philippines	
4	Win	3–0–1	Rodolfo Ignacio	PTS	8	13 Feb 1988	Bukidnon, Philippines	
3	Win	2–0–1	Jojie Agusan	UD	4	27 Dec 1987	Valencia, Bukidnon, Philippines	
2	Draw	1–0–1	Max Baguhin	PTS	4	30 Nov 1987	Maramag, Bukidnon, Philippines	
1	Win	1–0	Lito Valmora	PTS	6	24 Jan 1987	Bukidnon, Philippines	
