= José Emilio Perea =

Mexican boxer (born 1983)

Personal information
- Born: José Emilio Perea Trujillo; 19 January 1983 (age 43) Pachuca, Hidalgo, Mexico
- Height: 1.81 m (5 ft 11 in)
- Weight: Light welterweight Lightweight; Super featherweight

Boxing career
- Reach: 185 cm (73 in)
- Stance: Orthodox

Boxing record
- Total fights: 23
- Wins: 21
- Win by KO: 13
- Losses: 2
- Draws: 0
- No contests: 0

José Emilio Perea Trujillo (born 19 January 1983) is a Mexican professional boxer. He's currently the WBC FECARBOX lightweight Champion and was the WBC FECARBOX super featherweight Champion.

== Professional career ==
On 20 February 2010 Perea beat Panama's Julio Camano by 9th round T.K.O. in Mérida, Yucatán, Mexico.
