= Kris Martinez =

- Also known as: Kristory
- Born: September 1, 1973 (age 51); Los Angeles
- Occupation(s): Entertainer, musician, songwriter, comedian
- Website: www.krismartinez.com

Kris Martinez (born September 1, 1973) is an American entertainer, musician, songwriter and, previously, a comedian.

Martinez's comedic stage name was Kristory; he performed in, and hosted, shows at the Laugh Factory and The Improv Comedy club, Hollywood, California, He has appeared on cable television shows MUN2's Loco Comedy Jam, and Si TV's Latino Laugh Festival, and has been the subject of articles at Latina Magazine, Chicano Rap Magazine and the Los Angeles Times's calendarlive.

Martinez has presented on KIIS-FM radio in Los Angeles, with two-minute celebrity gossip clips on his Kristory's K-Spot.
