= Saddam Kietyongyuth =

Thai boxer

- Born: Narong Bunchan; March 8, 1983 (age 43); Krabi, Thailand
- Other names: Da Bomb
- Nationality: Thai
- Height: 168 cm (5 ft 6 in)
- Weight: 63 kg (139 lb; 9.9 st)
- Division: Lightweight
- Fighting out of: Bangkok, Thailand

Professional boxing record
- Total: 36
- Wins: 28
- By knockout: 22
- Losses: 8

Other information
- Boxing record from BoxRec

Saddam Kietyongyuth (born March 3, 1983) is a professional boxer and former Muay Thai fighter from Thailand. He is a former WBC Asian Boxing Council Champion.

== Boxing career ==
His first fight was against Munukifi Suivu at the Phayao Province, Thailand 2004-05-18. He was the WBC Asian Boxing Council lightweight champion.
