= Jana Roxas =

Filipina actress

- Born: Joanna Bangis; August 22, 1990 (age 36); Tarlac, Philippines
- Occupation: Actress
- Years active: 2005–2010
- Agent: GMA Artist Center (2005–2010)
- Height: 1.63 m (5 ft 4 in)
- Spouse: Ejay Falcon (m. 2023)

Joanna Bangis-Falcon (born August 22, 1990), simply known as the stage name, Jana Roxas, is a Filipina former actress.

She was known as Starstruck Batch 3 Avenger along with Chuck Allie, Iwa Moto, Gian Carlos and the Ultimate Survivors Jackie Rice and Marky Cielo. She appeared in GMA-7 TV series like Dapat Ka Bang Mahalin? with Aljur Abrenica and Kris Bernal, and Ikaw Sana with Jennylyn Mercado and Mark Herras.

After she played the kind-hearted rape victim in Dapat Ka Bang Mahalin?, Jana Roxas reappeared as the vindictive and socialite Charlene in Ikaw Sana.

== Personal life ==
Roxas was born in Tarlac. Her parents were separated shortly after she was born. She was abandoned by her father at birth, while her mother left and remarried. She was raised by her grandmother.

In 2016, Roxas began a relationship with actor Ejay Falcon. They got married on March 25, 2023 after seven years of dating.

== Filmography ==
- StarStruck: The Nationwide Invasion (2005–2006)
- SOP Gigsters (2005–2006)
- Love to Love - Young At Heart (2006)
- Now and Forever - Duyan (2006)
- Mga Kwento ni Lola Basyang - Ang Mahiwagang Balabal (2007)
- My Only Love (2007)
- Zaido: Pulis Pangkalawakan (2007)
- E.S.P. (2008)
- Lipgloss (2008)
- Magkaibigan (2008)
- Codename: Asero (2008)
- Gaano Kadalas ang Minsan (2008)
- Dapat Ka Bang Mahalin? (2009)
- Adik Sa'Yo (2009)
- Ikaw Sana (2009)
