= Vaness del Moral =

Filipino actress

- Born: Martha Vanessa Antonio del Moral; May 23, 1988 (age 38); Baguio, Philippines
- Other names: Vaneng, Van, Vane, Gurna, Vanessa
- Occupations: Actress; dancer; singer
- Years active: 2005–present
- Agent: Sparkle GMA Artist Center (since 2005)
- Known for: Dina, Crisel, Gurna, Alex, Vicky, Jackie, Elena, Sally, Amasonang Kahel, Sosira, Hillary, Lea
- Spouse: Matthew Kier (m. 2018)
- Children: 2

Martha Vanessa Antonio del Moral-Kier (born Martha Vanessa Antonio del Moral; May 23, 1988), better known by her screen name Vaness del Moral, is a Filipino actress, dancer, and singer. She started her showbiz career through the interactive reality television show, StarStruck. She is best known for her television roles as Gurna in Encantadia and as Hillary Suarez in Widows' Web. She is a talent signed under GMA Artist Center.

== Early life ==
Del Moral was born on May 23, 1988 in Baguio, Benguet. She finished high school through Alternative Learning System along actress Barbie Forteza at San Francisco High School in Quezon City.

== Career ==
Del Moral joined StarStruck season 3 in 2005. She made it through to the Top 14 but was eliminated in week two. Following her elimination from StarStruck, Del Moral appeared in some of GMA's major shows such as Dyesebel, Zaido: Pulis Pangkalawakan and in Impostora. She is also in the movie One True Love. She played Dennis Trillo's sister in Adik Sa'Yo. After her Adik Sa'yo Role, she played Jennylyn Mercado's cousin in Ikaw Sana.

In 2010, Del Moral is in the Sine Novela's Gumapang Ka Sa Lusak and even the show is still in air, she is now had her biggest break yet, her villain role in Basahang Ginto opposite Carla Abellana. After her Basahang Ginto stint, Vaness also starred in the 2012 soap Faithfully and 2013 soap Kahit Nasaan Ka Man. In 2014 during daytime drama The Half Sisters as Jackie Perez. In 2016 she Joins in Encantadia as Gurna originally played by Girlie Sevilla.

== Personal life ==
Del Moral started a relationship with Matthew Kier in 2015. They engaged in May 2017. They married on February 18, 2018, for a garden ceremony at Pinewoods Golf & Country Club Estate in Baguio City. They had their first child on May 26, 2021, followed by second child in 2025.

== Filmography ==
=== Film ===
Year	Title	Role
2008	One True Love	Mimi
2011	Shake, Rattle & Roll 13	Denice Yuan
2013	Ang Maestra	Girlie

=== Television ===
Year	Title	Role(s)	Note(s)
2006	Posh	Vaness	
2006	Love to Love: Young at Heart	–	
2006	Love to Love: Fat is Fabulous	–	
2006	Love to Love: Jass Got Lucky	Via	
2006	Project 11	Various roles	
2007	Mga Kuwento ni Lola Basyang	Various roles	
2007	Muli	Rose	
2007	Impostora	Dindy	
2007–2008	Zaido: Pulis Pangkalawakan	Amasonang Kahel / Rhea	
2008	ESP	Grace	
2008	Dyesebel	Sosira	
2008–2009	Sine Novela: Saan Darating ang Umaga?	Donna	
2009	Adik Sa'Yo	Racquel Domingo	
2009–2010	Ikaw Sana	Lucia Mendez	
2010	Diva	Teen Eva	
2010	Sine Novela Presents: Gumapang Ka sa Lusak	Gina Mantaring	
2010	Sine Novela Presents: Mars Ravelo's Basahang Ginto	Sylvia Villamor	
2011	Dwarfina	Camilla	
2011	Magic Palayok	Magic Sandok	
2011	Futbolilits	Clarissa "Isay" Estrella	
2011	Spooky Nights: Singil	Melissa	
2011–2012	Ruben Mari's Kokak	Elizabeth Mampusti	
2012	Tweets for My Sweet	Anne	
2012	Faithfully	Dina Carvajal	
2012	Makapiling Kang Muli	Salve	
2013	Bingit	Lourvila	
2013	Indio	Elena Decena	
2013	Wagas	Uyen Feir	
2013	Kahit Nasaan Ka Man	Sally Castillo-Gomez	
2014	Rhodora X	Pia Sales-Alcantara	
2014–2015	The Half Sisters	Jackilyn "Jackie" Perez-Alcantara / Estrella Liwanag	247 episodes
2015–2016	Because of You	Alexandra "Alex" Tamayo	
2016–2017	Encantadia	Gurna	
2017–2018	Impostora	Criselda "Crisel" Estanislao	
2017	Daig Kayo ng Lola Ko	Witch	
2018	Tadhana: Dukot	Lanie	
2018–2019	Onanay	Imelda Samonte-Pascual	
2019	Hiram na Anak	Alma Alonta	
2019	Magpakailanman: Lotto Winner naging Loser	Vergie	
2019	Tadhana: Tatay Eddie	Carmen	
2020–2021	Love of My Life	Joyce Castro	
2022	Widows' Web	Hillary Pelaez-Suarez	
2022	Tadhana: Baliw na Puso	Sharlene	
2022–2023	Nakarehas na Puso	Natalia "Lea" Galang-Divino	
2023	Royal Blood	Hillary Pelaez-Suarez (a crossover character from Widows' Web)	
2023	Voltes V: Legacy	Contessa Zaki	
2023	Love Before Sunrise	Marijo Alcantara	
2024	Widows' War	Hillary Pelaez-Suarez (a crossover character from Widows' Web)	
2025	Lolong: Pangil ng Maynila	Ester	
