= SOP Gigsters =

Philippine television variety show

- Title card
- Genre: Variety show
- Presented by: Richard Gutierrez; Raymond Gutierrez
- Country of origin: Philippines
- Original language: Tagalog

Production
- Production locations: Studio 3, GMA Network Center, Quezon City, Philippines
- Camera setup: Multiple-camera setup
- Running time: 60 minutes
- Production company: GMA Entertainment TV

Original release
- Network: GMA Network
- Release: June 13, 2004 – October 22, 2006

Related
- SOP

SOP Gigsters is a Philippine television variety show broadcast by GMA Network. Hosted by Richard Gutierrez and Raymond Gutierrez, it premiered on June 13, 2004. The show concluded on October 22, 2006.

== Cast ==
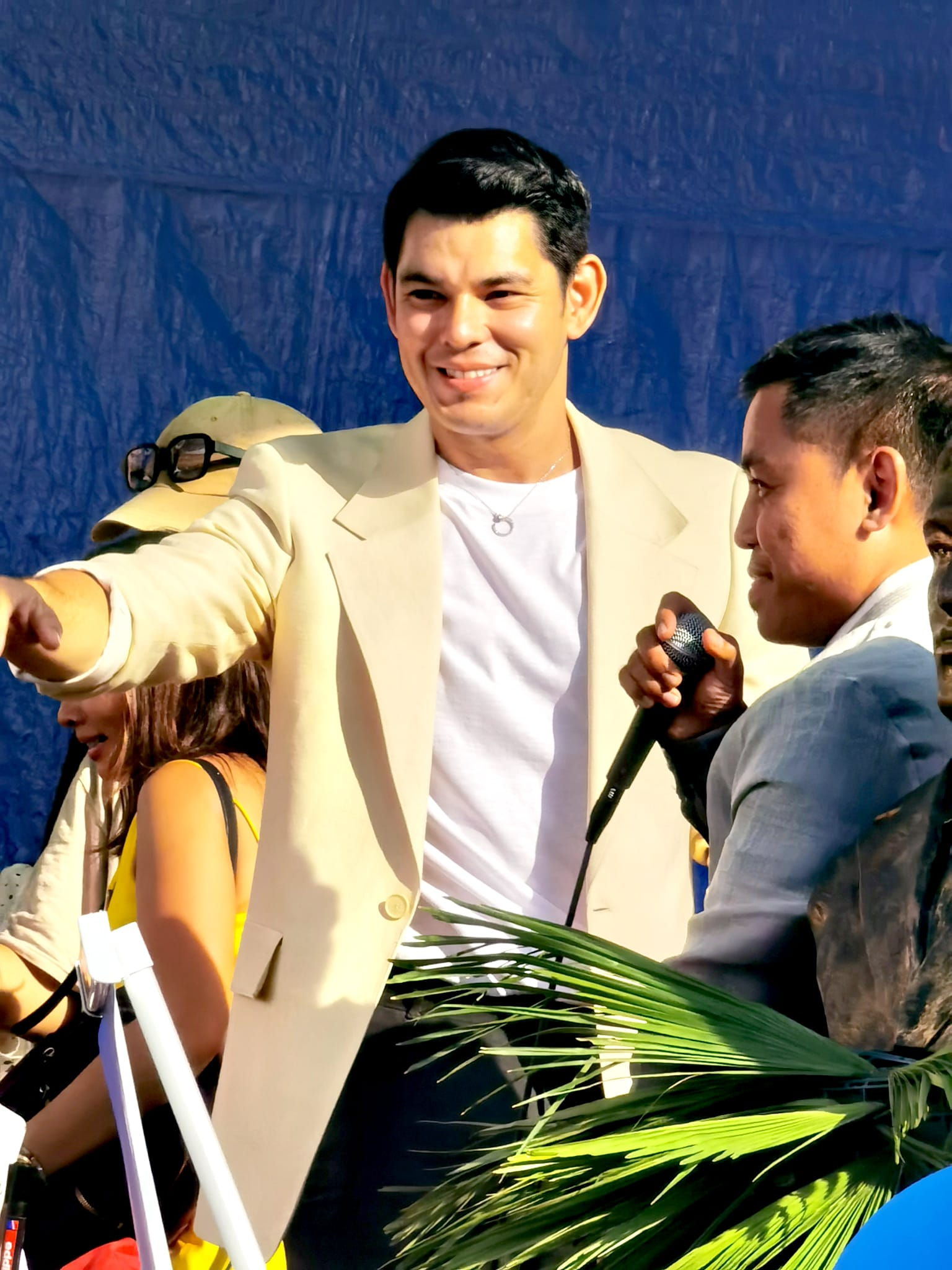
Richard Gutierrez served as a host.

Hosts

- Richard Gutierrez (2004–06)
- Raymond Gutierrez (2004–06)

Performers

- Chuck Allie (2006)
- Nicole Andersson (2004–06)
- Gian Carlos (2006)
- Rainier Castillo (2004–06)
- Marky Cielo (2006)
- Ryza Cenon (2005–06)
- JC De Vera (2004–06)
- Jacque Esteves
- Sheena Halili (2004–06)
- Mark Herras (2004–06)
- Yasmien Kurdi (2004–06)
- Jade Lopez (2004–06)
- Ehra Madrigal
- Jennylyn Mercado (2004–06)
- Iwa Moto (2006)
- C. J. Muere (2005–06)
- Rhian Ramos (2006)
- LJ Reyes (2005–06)
- Jackie Rice (2006)
- Jana Roxas (2006)
- Mike Tan (2005–06)
- Iya Villania (2004)
