= Duyan (TV series) =

2006 Philippine television drama series

- Also known as: Cradle of Love
- Genre: Drama
- Developed by: Don Michael Perez
- Written by: Kit Villanueva-Langit; Des Garbes-Severino; Luningning Interio-Ribay
- Directed by: Mac Alejandre
- Creative director: Roy Iglesias
- Starring: Dawn Zulueta; Ariel Rivera
- Theme music composer: Vince de Jesus
- Opening theme: "Now and Forever" by Kyla
- Country of origin: Philippines
- Original language: Tagalog
- No. of episodes: 70

Production
- Executive producer: Camille Pengson
- Camera setup: Multiple-camera setup
- Running time: 30 minutes
- Production company: GMA Entertainment TV

Original release
- Network: GMA Network
- Release: April 17 – July 21, 2006

Duyan (transl. cradle / international title: Cradle of Love) is a 2006 Philippine television drama series broadcast by GMA Network. The series is the fifth installment of Now and Forever. Directed by Mac Alejandre, it stars Dawn Zulueta and Ariel Rivera. It premiered on April 17, 2006. The series concluded on July 21, 2006, with a total of 70 episodes.

== Cast and characters ==
Cast

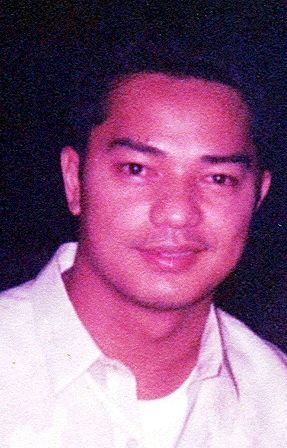
Ariel Rivera

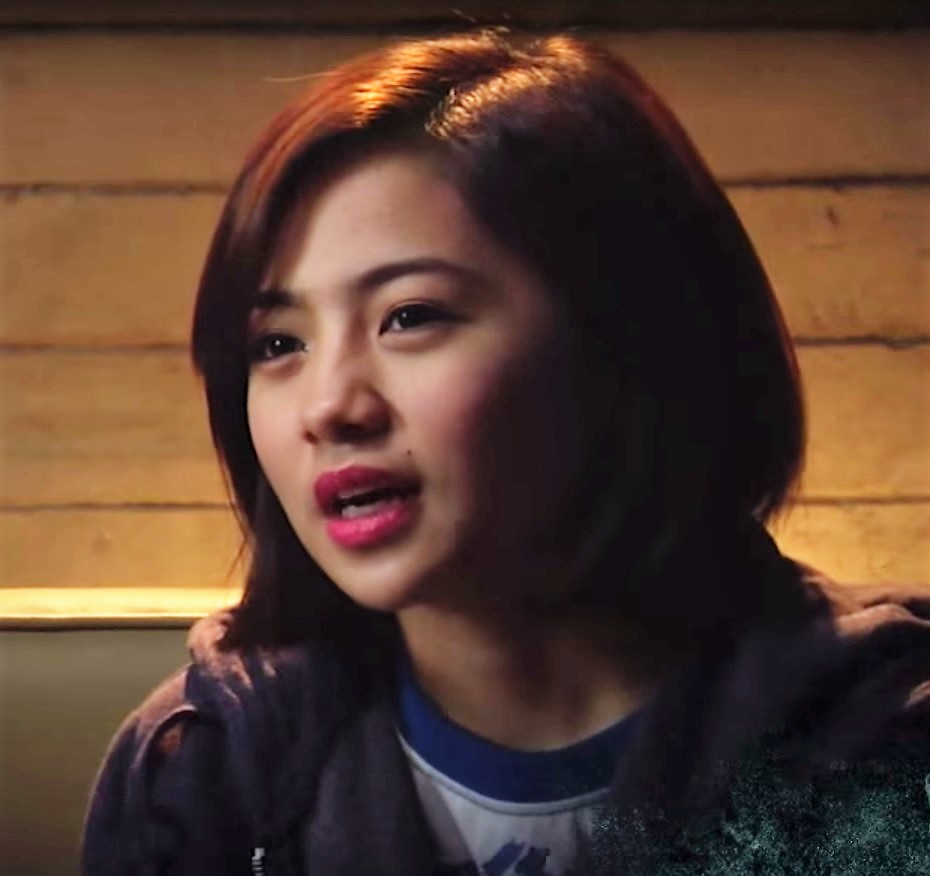
Ella Cruz

Lead cast

- Dawn Zulueta as Adea
- Ariel Rivera as Mateo

Supporting cast

- Glydel Mercado as Loren
- Ella Guevara as Cindy
- Ella Cruz as Ella
- Emilio Garcia as Raul
- Alicia Alonzo as Precy
- Jana Roxas as Rowena
- Chuck Allie as Francis
- Gabby Eigenmann as Allan
- Ramil Rodriguez as Ronaldo
