= Zaido: Pulis Pangkalawakan =

Philippine television drama series

- Title card
- Also known as: Zaido: The Space Sheriff
- Genre: Science fiction drama; Action
- Based on: Metal Hero Series by Toei Company
- Developed by: Don Michael Perez
- Written by: Des Garbes Severino; Anna Aleta Nadela
- Directed by: Dominic Zapata
- Starring: Dennis Trillo; Marky Cielo; Aljur Abrenica
- Theme music composer: Don Michael Perez
- Opening theme: "Pulis Pangkalawakan" by Sandwich
- Country of origin: Philippines
- Original language: Tagalog
- No. of episodes: 100

Production
- Executive producer: Helen Rose S. Sese
- Camera setup: Multiple-camera setup
- Running time: 30–45 minutes
- Production company: GMA Entertainment TV

Original release
- Network: GMA Network
- Release: September 24, 2007 – February 8, 2008

Related
- Shaider

Zaido: Pulis Pangkalawakan (transl. Zaido: space police / international title: Zaido: The Space Sheriff) is a Philippine television drama science fiction action series broadcast by GMA Network. The series is a spin-off of the Japanese Metal Hero Series' Space Sheriff Shaider. Directed by Dominic Zapata, it stars Dennis Trillo, Marky Cielo and Aljur Abrenica. A special Zaido: Ang Bagong Alamat (transl. Zaido: The New Legend) – The Making of Zaido aired on September 22, 2007. It premiered on September 24, 2007 on the network's Telebabad line up. The series concluded on February 8, 2008, with a total of 100 episodes.

The series is streaming online on YouTube.

== Cast and characters ==
Cast

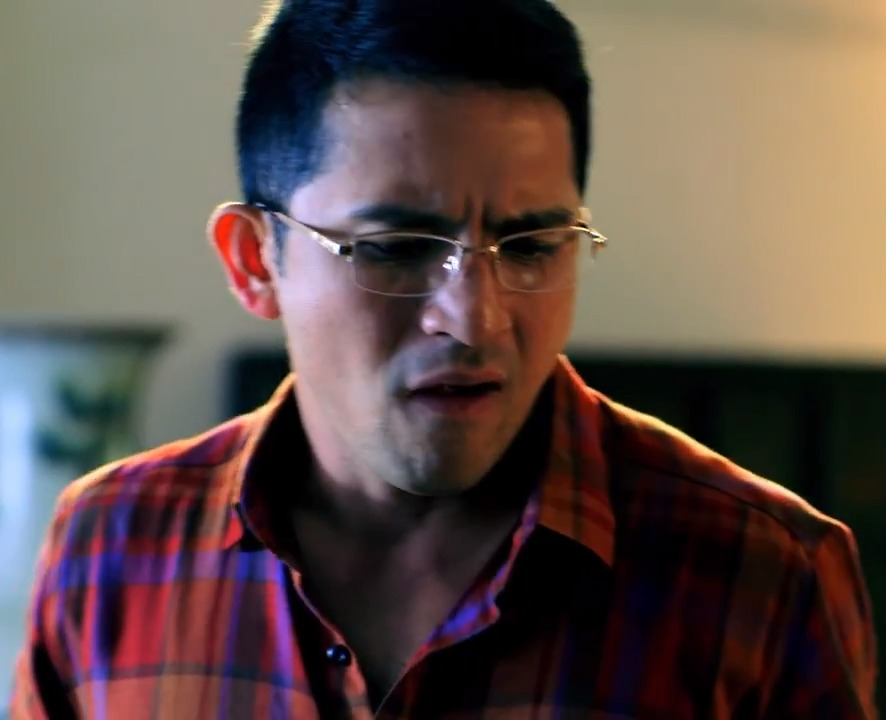
Dennis Trillo

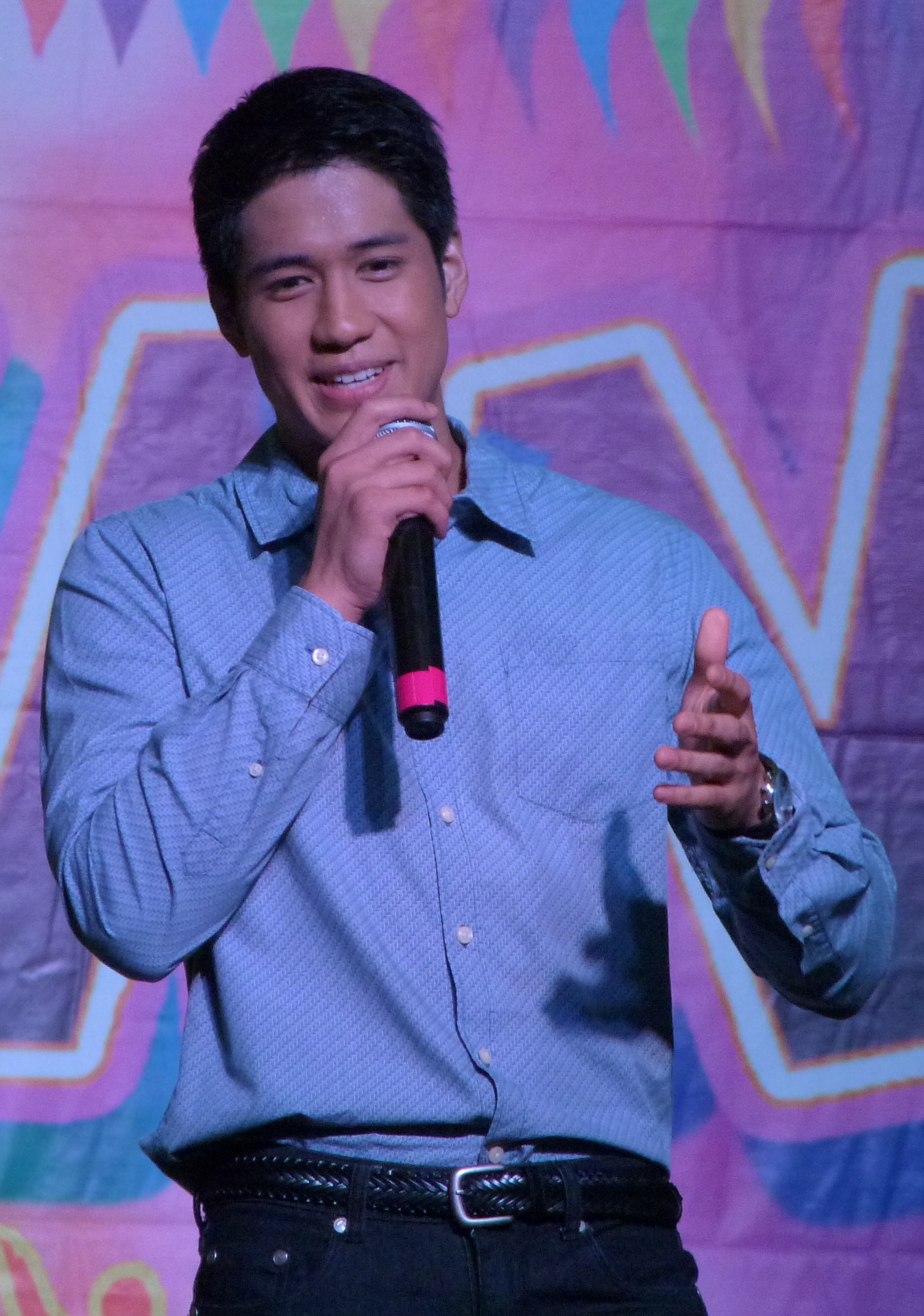
Aljur Abrenica

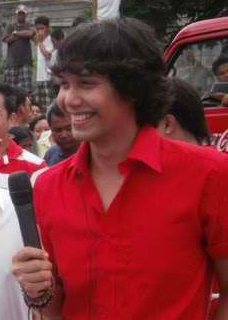
Paolo Ballesteros

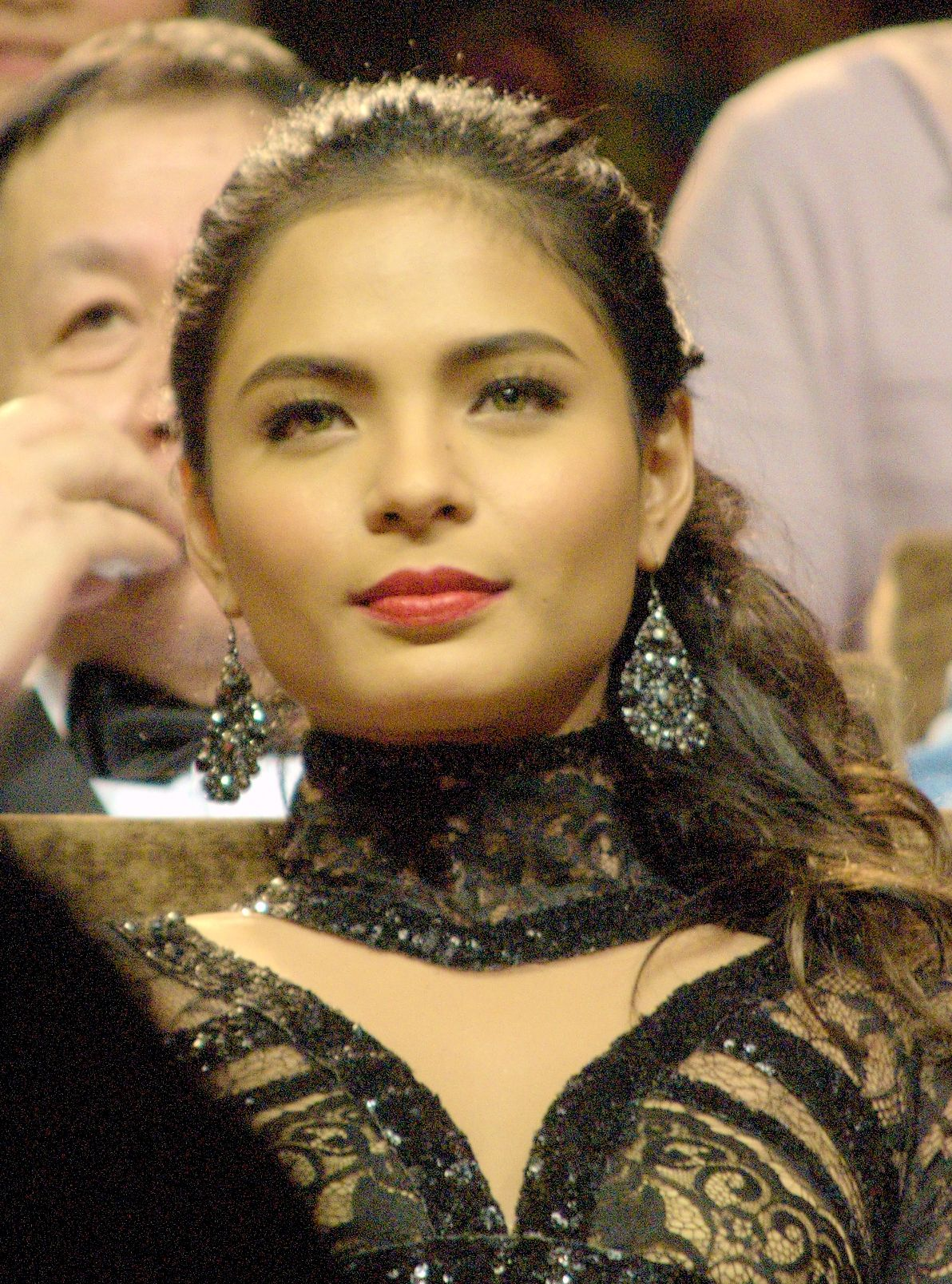
Lovi Poe

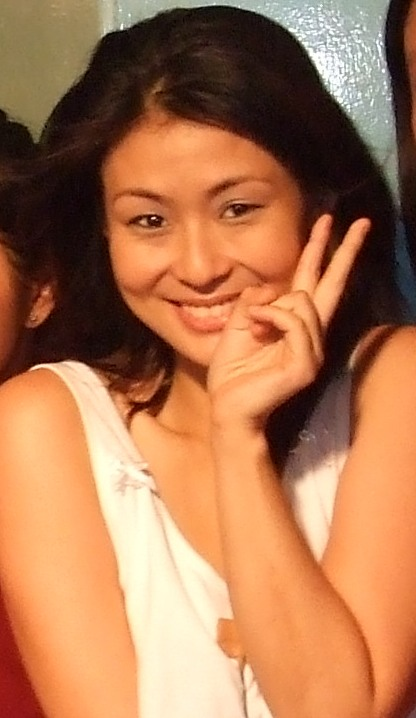
Iwa Moto

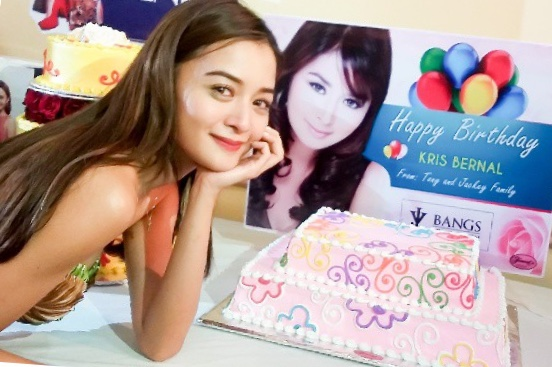
Kris Bernal

Lead cast

- Dennis Trillo as Gallian Magdalion / Zaido Blue
- Marky Cielo as Alexis Lorenzo / Zaido Green
- Aljur Abrenica as Cervano Torres / Zaido Red

Supporting cast

- Lorna Tolentino as Helen Lorenzo / Shanara
- Raymart Santiago as Alvaro Lorenzo / Azur / Gamma
- Tirso Cruz III as Ramiro
- Diana Zubiri as Carmela Langit / Arianna
- Jay Manalo as Drigo
- Ian de Leon as Zion
- Paolo Ballesteros as Ida
- Lovi Poe as Mona Langit
- Dion Ignacio as Thor Mentor
- Karel Marquez as Lyka
- LJ Reyes as Lila / Debbie
- Iwa Moto as Itim / Sonia Tamano
- Kris Bernal as Amy Maltayra
- Melissa Avelino as Rosas / Marla
- Arci Muñoz as Puti / Stacy
- Vaness del Moral as Kahel / Rhea
- Tiya Pusit as Angge Mentor
- Spanky Manikan / John Feir as Eng
- Pinky Amador as Armida
- Ricardo Cepeda as Nalax King
- Richard Quan as Danny Torres
- Lovely Rivero as Elaine Torres

Guest cast

- Chariz Solomon as Gayke
- Jacob Rica as Gelo Torres / Zaido Kid Red
- Pauleen Luna as Lyvia
- Isabel Granada as Luna
- Robert Villar as Oggy Lorenzo / Zaido Kid Green
- JM Reyes as Aqualia / Zaido Kid Blue
- Charisse Hermoso as Ave / Zaido Kid Yellow
- Charlotte Hermoso as Vea / Zaido Kid Pink
- Nicole Dulalia as Ida Dida
- Patricia Ysmael as Fasullo / Inday
- Paulo Avelino as Cervano's buddy
- Ken Punzalan as Cervano's buddy
- Vivo Ouano as Cervano's buddy
- Karen delos Reyes as Ederlyn
- Lifernand as Dodong
- Gio Alvarez as Giggle / Giga-wiga
- Sandy Talag as younger Sharina
- Gian Carlos as Toby Mendoza / Zaido Gold Shadow
- Dexter Doria as Selma
- Jana Roxas as Sharina, younger Helen Lorenzo
- Ryan Yllana as Tabatino
- Alex Crisano as Vola
- Mura as Buboy
- Louie Alejandro as Izcaruz
- Al Tantay as Alberto Lorenzo
- Tai Tomoyuki as Shigeki

Voice cast

- Tirso Cruz III as Kuuma Le-ar
- Vincent Gutierrez as Shaider
- Noel Urbano as Ulla
- Jeffrey Tam as Robix

== Ratings ==
According to AGB Nielsen Philippines' Mega Manila household television ratings, the pilot episode of Zaido: Pulis Pangkalawakan earned a 34.6% rating. The final episode scored a 32.3% rating.
