= Marco Alcaraz =

Filipino actor

- Born: Marco Antonio Faylona Alcaraz; July 12, 1983 (age 43); Cebu City, Cebu, Philippines
- Education: San Sebastian College–Recoletos
- Occupations: Actor, model, basketball player
- Years active: 2003–present
- Agents: Star Magic (2003–2005); GMA Artist Center (2005–present)
- Height: 6 ft 1 in (185 cm)
- Spouse: Precious Lara Quigaman (m. 2012)
- Website: http://www.igma.tv/profile/marco-alcaraz

Marco Antonio Faylona Alcaraz (Tagalog pronunciation: [alkaˈɾas]; born July 12, 1983) is a Filipino actor, model, and former varsity basketball player at San Sebastian College-Recoletos. His first movie was Aishite Imasu 1941: Mahal Kita with Dennis Trillo. He wed on July 8, 2012, to the former beauty queen and the winner of the 2005 Miss International, Precious Lara Quigaman.

== Early life and education ==
Alcaraz is the eldest of six children in his family. Growing up in Cebu, he grew up wanting to be a basketball player. He studied at San Sebastian College-Recoletos, where he played for their varsity team, the Stags. However, in his rookie season, he suffered an ACL injury.

== Career ==
As he rehabbed from his injury for six months, Alcaraz tried modeling. He then auditioned for a role on ABS-CBN's It Might Be You. He got the role, in which he starred alongside John Lloyd Cruz and Bea Alonzo in a love triangle. The role made him popular, and led to him getting roles in an episode of Wansapanataym and as the lead in the film Birhen ng Manaoag. In 2008, he played a merman in Mars Ravelo's Dyesebel, in which he had to take swimming lessons for. He also had a role in Manay Po 2, in which he had comedic scenes and fight scenes.

== Personal life ==
Alcaraz is married to former beauty queen and the winner of the 2005 Miss International, Precious Lara Quigaman. They have three sons together and are currently based in Canada.

Alcaraz graduated with a degree in business management, which he once used to open a cell phone repair shop in a Rizal mall.

== Filmography ==
=== Film ===
Year	Title	Role
2004	Aishite Imasu 1941: Mahal Kita	Akihiro
2004	Beautiful Life	Peter
2005	Birhen ng Manaoag	-
2005	Shake, Rattle and Roll 2k5	Gener
2006	Blue Moon	-
2006	Don't Give Up on Us	Samuel
2006	Mga Batang Bangketa	Raymond
2007	Angels	Acid
2008	Manay Po 2: Overload	Moxie
2008	Shake, Rattle & Roll X	Agtaya
2009	Villa Estrella	Gabriel
2009	Pitik Bulag	Angelo
2009	Marino	
2020	Happy Times	Kim's father

=== Television ===
Year	Title	Role
2003–2004	It Might Be You	Axel
2004	Seasons of Love	Ian
2005	Pablo S. Gomez's Kampanerang Kuba	Gabriel
2006	Love to Love: Bestfriends	Gio
2006	Komiks Presents: Blusang Itim	Angelo
2006	Ganda ng Lola Ko	
2007	Fantastic Man	Ivan
2007	Sine Novela: Pati Ba Pintig ng Puso	Bien
2007–2008	Sine Novela: My Only Love	Jonas
2008	E.S.P.	Edmund
2008	Mars Ravelo's Dyesebel	Usaro
2009	Dear Friend: Madrasta	Lino
2009	Zorro	Julio
2009	Everybody Hapi	Rick Sandoval (Guest Appearance)
2009	Rosalinda	Anibal Pacheco
2009–2010	Sine Novela: Tinik sa Dibdib	Dr. Paolo Ramirez
2010	Endless Love	Nestor
2010	Claudine Presents: Hostage	Various
2010	Beauty Queen	Himself / Presenter
2011	My Lover, My Wife	Arthur Salvador / Lawrence Delgado
2011	Sisid	Chad
2011	Spooky Nights: Nuno Sa Feng Shui	Nunok
2011	Pahiram ng Isang Ina	Ryan Perez
2012	Broken Vow	Michael Pascual
2012	Magpakailanman: The Mirriam Castillo Story	Albert
2012	Luna Blanca	Alex
2013	Indio	Javier Crisanto
2013	Bukod Kang Pinagpala	Digoy
2013–2014	Prinsesa ng Buhay Ko	Waldo Salazar
2014	Innamorata	Juanito Padilla
2014	Ang Dalawang Mrs. Real	Edgar Ramos
2014	Ilustrado	Paciano Rizal
2014	Give Love on Christmas: The Gift Giver	Anton Sanchez
2015	Pari 'Koy	Bart
2015	Ipaglaban Mo!: Inabusong Karapatan	Jimmy
2015	FPJ's Ang Probinsyano	Dr. Ramon Dalisay
2015	All of Me	Daniel
2016	Hanggang Makita Kang Muli	Dominic Santos
2016	Walang Kapalit: Eat Bulaga! Lenten Special 2016	Jay
2016	A1 Ko Sa 'Yo	Rex
2016	Karelasyon: Kabit-kabit	Paolo
2016	Ipaglaban Mo!: Bulag	Tomas
2016–2018	Ika-6 na Utos	Chandler
2017	Trops	Bastie
2017	Love is...	Miguel
2017	Magpakailanman: Mag-Inang Biktima	Daniel
2017	Daig Kayo ng Lola Ko	Mario
2018	Tadhana: Luho	Oliver
2018	Magpakailanman: Kuya Na, Nanay Pa	Marco
2018	Ika-5 Utos	Sen. Renato ''Senator Atong'' Martirez
2018	Dear Uge: Si Yaya Madrama	Chris
2018	Tadhana: Pinagsabay	Rodrigo
2018	Wagas: Hanggang Langit	Donn
2018–2019	Onanay	Vincent "Vince" Delgado
2019	Tadhana: Positive	Jonald
2019	The Better Woman	Glenn Santiago
2019	Magpakailanman: Nagmahal, Nasaktan, Pinagsamantalahan	Elias
2021	Maalaala Mo Kaya: TV	Denis Alcantara
2021	Ang Dalawang Ikaw	Rex
2022	Lolong	Marco Mendrano
