= Iwa Moto =

Filipino actress, model and reality television personality

Iwa Moto イワ モト
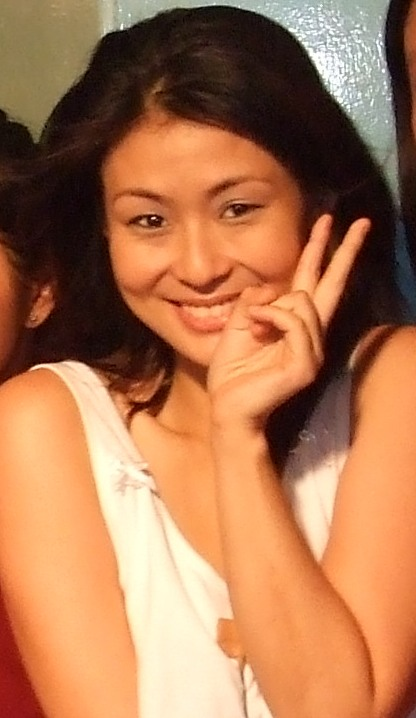
- Iwa Moto in April 2010
- Born: Aileen Quimado Iwamoto; August 29, 1988 (age 38); Las Piñas, Metro Manila, Philippines
- Occupations: Actress, model, reality television personality
- Years active: 2005–present
- Known for: StarStruck; Kung Mahawi Man ang Ulap; Bakekang; Darna
- Partner: Pampi Lacson (since 2012)
- Children: 2
- Relatives: Miki Iwamoto (sister); Joaquin Regio (nephew)

Aileen Quimado Iwamoto (born August 29, 1988), known professionally as Iwa Moto (イワ モト), is a Japanese–Philippine actress, model and reality television personality. She is the first runner up in the third season of StarStruck, a reality-based talent search show of GMA Network. She is well known for playing Rita Acuesta on Kung Mahawi Man ang Ulap and Valentina in Darna.

== Acting ==
Moto auditioned for StarStruck, but failed to qualify until she has succeeded in audition for the third season, in which she ended up as the First Princess along with Gian Carlos as the First Prince. After StarStruck, Iwamoto appeared on SOP Gigsters, Love to Love: Young At Heart and Nuts Entertainment. During her stint in Nuts Entertainment, Iwamoto was suspended for 6 weeks along with Jackie Rice. After the suspension, Iwamoto came back to Nuts Entertainment, joining the cast of Bakekang, her first primetime show where she played Jenny, the best friend of Kristal, played by Lovi Poe, and also on the last season of Love to Love which is Jazz Got Lucky. Iwamoto also portrayed her life story on Magpakailanman. In 2007, Moto appeared in Super Twins, wherein she portrayed the character Moshi Moshi Manika, her first antagonist role. After that, Iwamoto portrayed Rita on Sine Novela's third installment Kung Mahawi Man ang Ulap, wherein she got a favorable response from the viewers of the show.

Due to her performance in Kung Mahawi Man ang Ulap, she was in included in Zaido: Pulis Pangkalawakan as a Black Amazona, her third antagonist role. In 2008, Iwamoto became the image model of FHM Philippines, making her the third Filipina to hold that title after Asia Agcaoili and Katrina Halili. In September of the same year, Iwamoto appeared on the cover of FHM Philippines for the second time. She was a previous covergirl of FHM Singapore. Straight after Zaido: Pulis Pangkalawakan, Iwamoto was given a supporting role in Robin Padilla's Joaquin Bordado, as Diane, but her character was killed off for Iwamoto to focus on Sine Novela's eighth installment Magdusa Ka with Katrina Halili and Dennis Trillo. After that, Iwamoto was included on the cast of Luna Mystika as Donita Sagrado, the main antagonist of Heart Evangelista's character.

In 2009, Moto appeared in the primetime series Adik Sa'Yo as Andrea, but left for Darna to play Valentina, the main antagonist of Darna and her biggest role in a drama so far. In 2010, Iwamoto began reappearing currently reappearing in Darna and also on Sine Novela: Ina, Kasusuklaman Ba Kita?, in which she portrays the role of Rossan. In Darna, she played the character Valentina, the prime rival of superheroine Darna. She appeared in Love Bug: "Last Romance" and also as a guest in Pilyang Kerubin and in the TV series Beauty Queen. In 2011, she participated in Dwarfina, starring Heart Evangelista and Dennis Trillo. Her last TV project was Andres de Saya, starring Cesar Montano and Iza Calzado. In 2012, she appeared on Wil Time Bigtime but left shortly due to her existing contract with GMA Network.

== Personal life ==
Moto is the eldest of the three siblings. Her father, Hiroaki Iwamoto (岩本 宏明) was a Japanese immigrant to the Philippines while her mother is Filipino.

Since 2012, Moto is in a relationship with Panfilo "Pampi" Lacson Jr., son of Senator Panfilo Lacson, with whom she has a daughter, Hiromi "Eve", born on September 23, 2013. She gave birth to a son, Caleb Jiro, on January 21, 2021. She is a stepmother to Pampi's son, Panfilo "Thirdy" Lacson III, child with Jodi Sta. Maria, born in 2005.

In 2009, Moto married martial arts fighter, Mickey Ablan, but the couple separated in 2011 when Mickey had a new partner, Janna Dominguez.

In 2026, Moto and Lacson were engaged.

== Filmography ==
=== Film ===
Year	Title	Role
2006	White Lady	Mimi
2006	Pitong Dalagita	Tisha
2008	My Monster Mom	Vivian
2008	Shake, Rattle & Roll X	Wai Lana
2017	The Debutantes	Kate's aunt

=== Television ===
Year	Title	Role
2005–2006	StarStruck: The Nationwide Invasion	Herself
2006–2008	Nuts Entertainment	Co-host
2007	Bitoy's Funniest Videos	Co-host
2006	Posh	Herself
2006	SOP Gigsters	Host/Performer
2006	Love to Love: Young at Heart	Denisse
2006	Magpakailanman: The Iwa Moto Life Story	Herself
2006	Love to Love: Jass Got Lucky	Max
2006–2007	Bakekang	Jenny
2007	Magic Kamison: The True Lindsay	Lindsay/Laura
2007	Mga Kuwento ni Lola Basyang	Princesa Singsing
2007	SOP Rules	Performer
2007	Super Twins	Monica/Moshi Moshi Manika
2007	Sine Novela: Kung Mahawi Man ang Ulap	Rita Acuesta
2007–2008	Zaido: Pulis Pangkalawakan	Amasonang Itim / Soñia Tamano
2008	Joaquin Bordado	Dianne
2008	Sine Novela: Magdusa Ka	Millet Calpito
2008–2009	Luna Mystika	Donita Sagrado
2009	Dear Friend: Madrasta	Gellie
2009	Adik Sa'Yo	Andrea
2009–2010	Darna	Valentina / Babaeng Ahas
2010	Sine Novela: Ina, Kasusuklaman Ba Kita?	Rossan Montenegro-Ortega
2010	Diz Iz It!	Celebrity Judge
2010	Love Bug: The Last Romance	Remy
2010	Pilyang Kerubin	Eva
2010	Beauty Queen	young Leavida Acuesta-Rivas
2011	Dwarfina	Lucille Ballesteros
2011	Andres de Saya	Nica Landutay
2012	Kapitan Awesome	Aphrodite
2012	Felina: Prinsesa ng mga Pusa	Liza Golvez
2012	Third Eye	Daisy
2012–2013	Enchanted Garden	Santana
2013	Cassandra: Warrior Angel	Ursula's mother
2015	Marimar	Magda Evangelista

== Awards ==
Year	Awards/Critics/Contest	Result
2006	FHM 100 Sexiest Women in the World (Philippines)	Rank 16
2006	HI Magazine's one of the most beautiful faces in Philippine Showbiz	Rank 20
2007	FHM 100 Sexiest Women in the World (Philippines)	Rank 10
2007	MAXIM 100 Hottest Women on the Planet (Philippines)	Rank 50
2008	MAXIM 100 Hottest Women on the Planet (Philippines)	Rank 10
2008	UNO 100 Hottest Women on the Planet (Philippines)	Rank 2
2008	FHM 100 Sexiest Women in the World (Philippines)	Rank 7
2008	Yes Magazine's 100 Most Beautiful People in the Philippines	Random
2009	FHM 100 Sexiest Women in the World (Philippines)	Rank 5
2010	FHM 100 Sexiest Women in the World (Philippines)	Rank 4
2011	FHM 100 Sexiest Women in the World (Philippines)	Rank 8
2012	FHM 100 Sexiest Women in the World (Philippines)	Rank 14

Awards and achievements
Preceded by LJ Reyes	StarStruck; Runner-up; 2005 (season 3)	Succeeded by Rich Asuncion; Kris Bernal
