= Dapat Ka Bang Mahalin? =

2009 Philippine television drama series

- Title card
- Also known as: Second Chances
- Genre: Romantic drama
- Based on: Dapat Ka Bang Mahalin? (1984) by Emmanuel H. Borlaza
- Directed by: Maryo J. de los Reyes
- Starring: Aljur Abrenica; Kris Bernal
- Theme music composer: George Canseco
- Opening theme: "Dapat Ka Bang Mahalin" by Mae Flores
- Country of origin: Philippines
- Original language: Tagalog
- No. of episodes: 78

Production
- Executive producer: Camille Gomba-Montaño
- Production locations: Metro Manila, Philippines
- Camera setup: Multiple-camera setup
- Running time: 25–35 minutes
- Production company: GMA Entertainment TV

Original release
- Network: GMA Network
- Release: March 2 – June 19, 2009

Dapat Ka Bang Mahalin? (transl. should you be loved? / international title: Second Chances) is a 2009 Philippine television drama romance series broadcast by GMA Network. Based on a 1984 Philippine film of the same title, the series is the thirteenth instalment of Sine Novela. Directed by Maryo J. de los Reyes, it stars Aljur Abrenica and Kris Bernal. It premiered on March 2, 2009 on the network's Dramarama sa Hapon line up. The series concluded on June 19, 2009, with a total of 78 episodes.

== Cast and characters ==
Cast

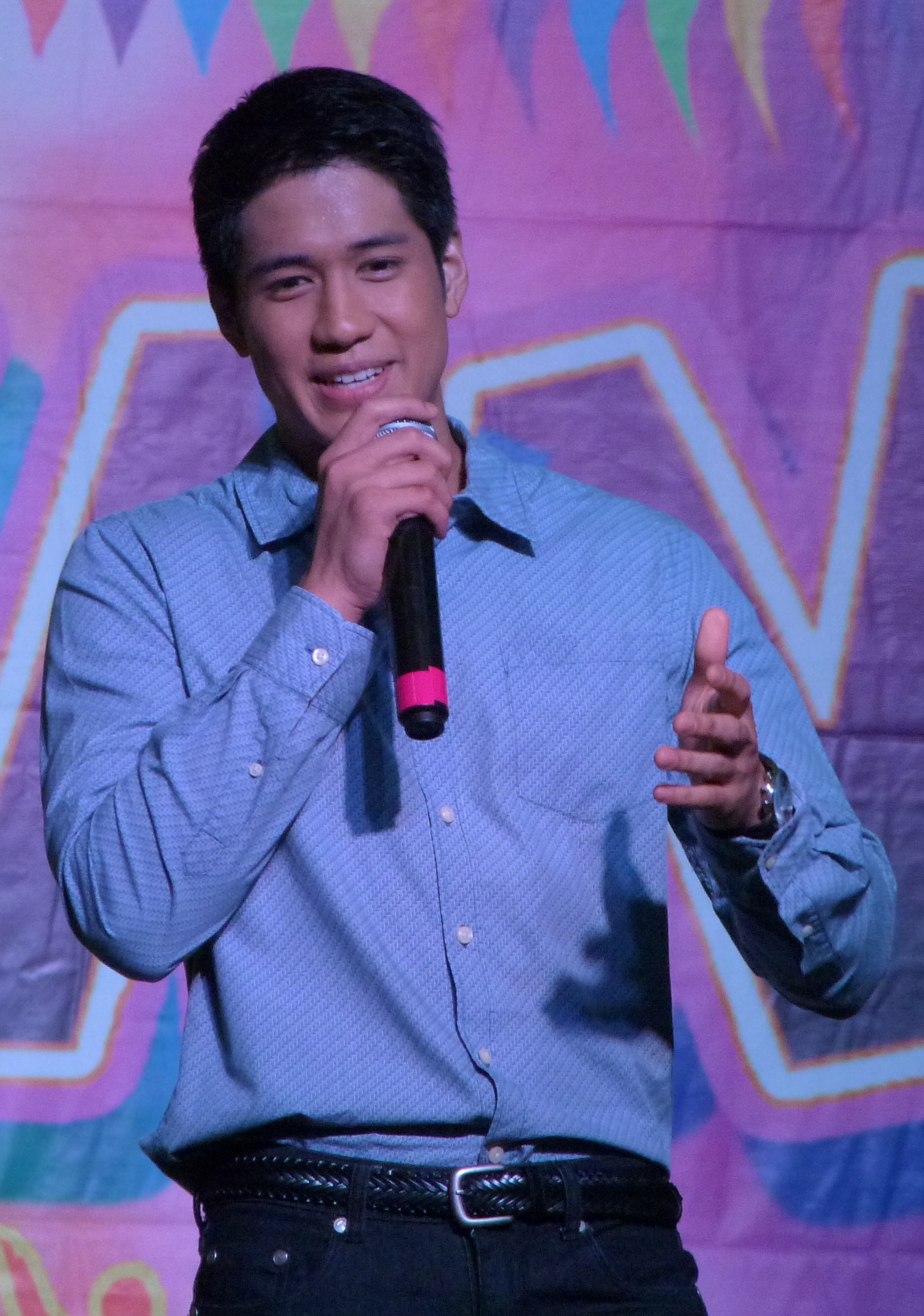
Aljur Abrenica

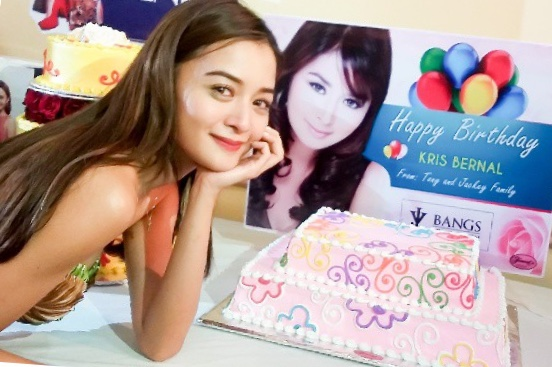
Kris Bernal

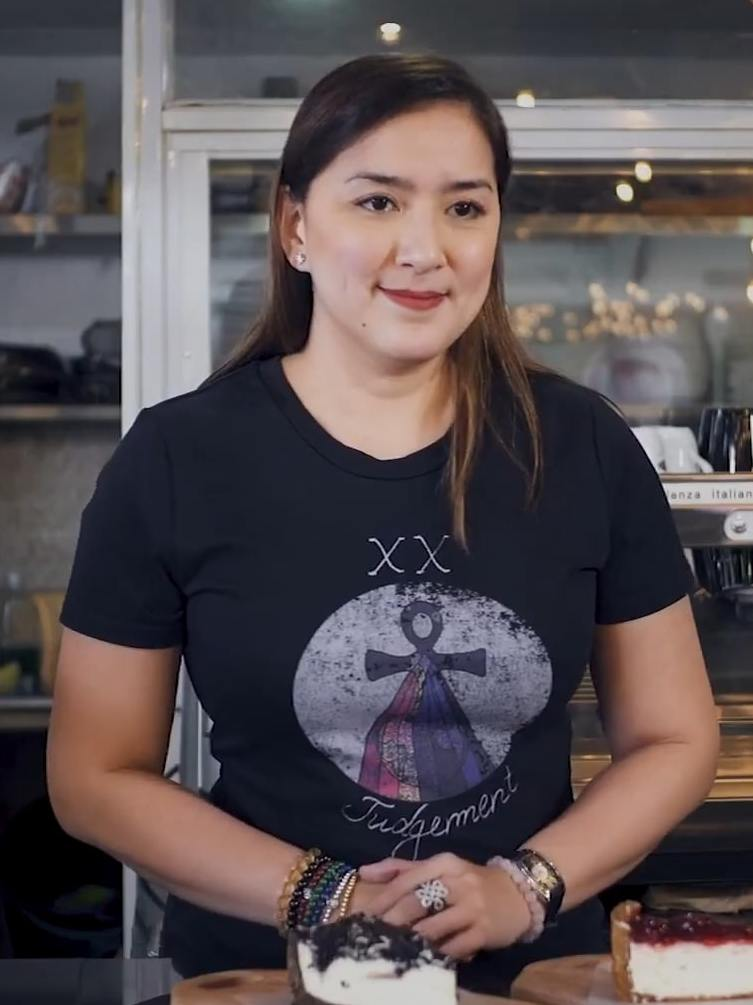
Ara Mina

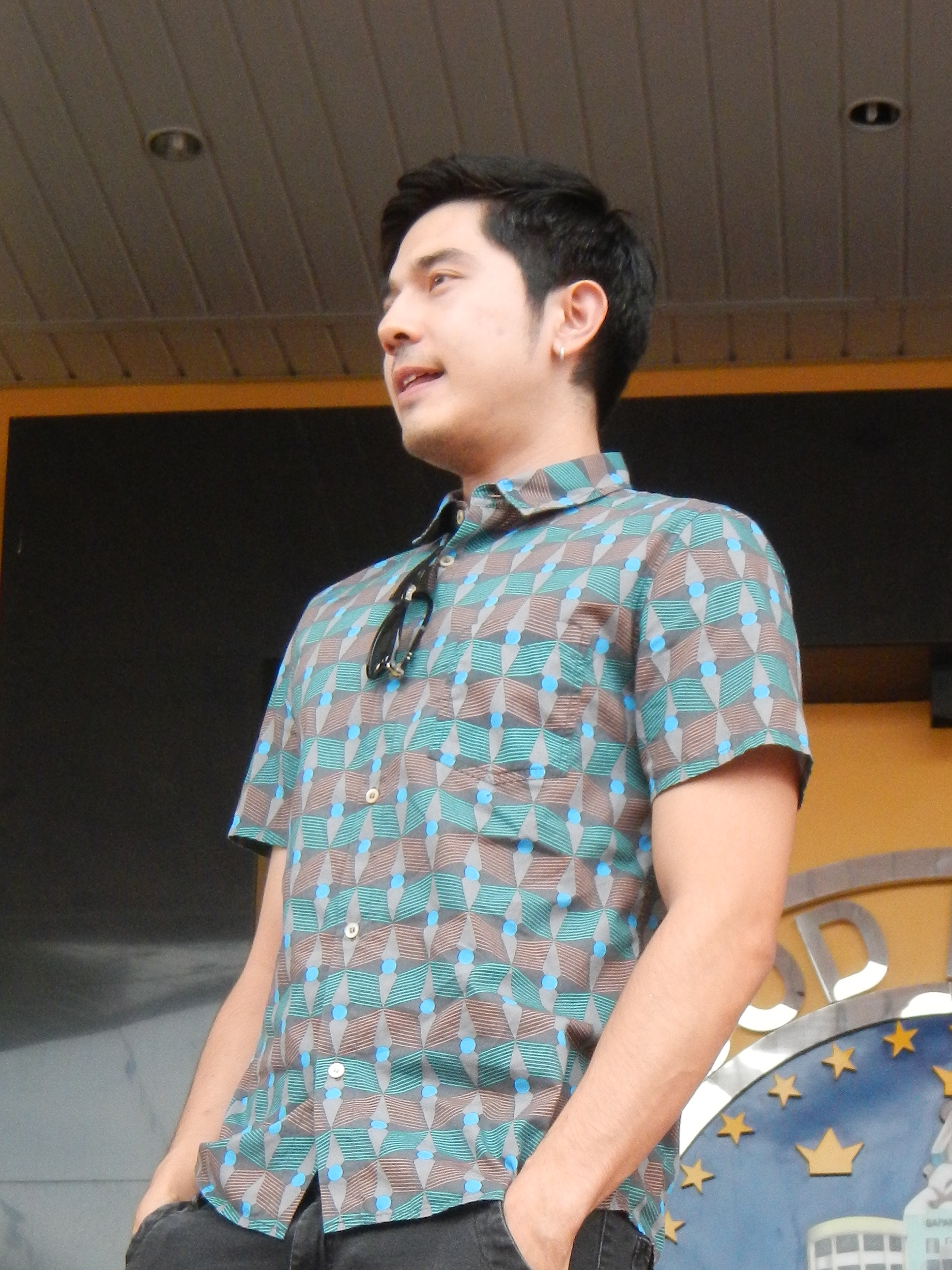
Paulo Avelino

Lead cast

- Aljur Abrenica as Miguelito "Lito" Sanchez
- Kris Bernal as Myrna Ramos-Sanchez

Supporting cast

- Ara Mina as Glacilda Bautista
- Paulo Avelino as Kiko Claro
- Mike Tan as Bong Ramos
- Juan Rodrigo as Rene Ramos
- Mariz Ricketts as Linda Ramos
- Lloyd Samartino as Eddie Sanchez
- Maritoni Fernandez as Constance "Connie" Sanchez
- Carlo Aquino as Philippe "Phil" Bautista
- Maybelyn Dela Cruz as Cherry Ramos
- Rhea Nakpil as Encar
- Jana Roxas as Antonia Claro
- Krystal Reyes as Angeli Claro
- Say Alonzo as Anina
- Jake Vargas as Elmer Ramos
- Matutina as Sima
- Dart Zia as Yanboy
- Kiko Junio as Ovige
- Lawrence Gutierrez as Migs

Guest cast

- Pen Medina as Tata Teryo
- Julio Diaz as Rafael Bautista
- Ana Capri as Jessa
- Boy Roque as Phil's jailmate

== Ratings ==
According to AGB Nielsen Philippines' Mega Manila household television ratings, the pilot episode of Dapat Ka Bang Mahalin? earned a 22.1% rating. The final episode scored a 30.5% rating.
