= Sandy Talag =

Filipino actress

- Born: Sandy Ann Rivera Talag; June 11, 1998 (age 28); Baguio, Benguet, Philippines
- Occupations: Actress, singer, model, radio host
- Years active: 2004–present
- Agent: GMA Artist Center (2004–present)

Sandra Ann Rivera Talag (born June 11, 1998) is a Filipina actress, singer, radio host and model. She rose to fame through the television talent search show StarStruck Kids.

== Career ==
Talag entered showbiz through StarStruck Kids in 2004. Although she didn't win, she went on to do more GMA television series such as Ang Mahiwagang Baul and Majika.

In 2012, Talag starred in a Dutch indie film Lilet Never Happened as a young prostitute. The film was received well in film festivals, and earned her acting awards in some film festivals.

In 2014, Talag joined the cast of Niño.

== Filmography ==
=== Film ===
Year	Title	Role	Notes
2005	Lovestruck	Young Denise	played the younger counterpart of Jennylyn Mercado for the first time
2007	Ouija	Young Ruth	played the younger counterpart of Rhian Ramos
2007	Bahay Kubo: A Pinoy Mano Po!	Young Jasmine	played the younger counterpart of Isabella De Leon
2012	Lilet Never Happened	Lilet	played a child prostitute

=== Television ===
Year	Title	Role
2004	StarStruck Kids	Herself
2005	Love To Love	Marcia
2005	Ang Mahiwagang Baul	Jewel
2006	Majika	Young Sara
2007	Lupin	Angela
2007	Daisy Siete	Young Rochelle
2007	Sine Novela: My Only Love	Musay
2007	Carlo J. Caparas' Kamandag	Young Ditas
2008	Codename: Asero	Sofie Aguillar
2008	Obra: Suspetsa	Young Nina
2008	Luna Mystika	Young Luna
2009	Dear Friend: The Three Bachelors	Young Sarah
2009	All About Eve	Young Erika
2009	Carlo J. Caparas' Totoy Bato	Hospital Client
2009	Adik Sa'Yo	Ria Domingo
2009	Ikaw Sana	Young Eliza
2009	Sana Ngayong Pasko	Young Fely
2010	Diva	Charice
2010	Langit sa Piling Mo	Young Marj
2010	JejeMom	Tweety Wilson
2010	Midnight DJ: Terror sa Talyer	Ghost of Girl
2011	Amaya	Herself/Girl Singer
2011	Futbolilits	
2011	Maynila: Loving Your Own	Alda
2012	Maynila: Oh Boy!, She's my Girl	
2013	Kidlat	Young Lara
2014	Carmela	Sabel Mener
2014	Niño	Tiny
2015	Maynila	Tiny
2016	Wish I May	Donna
2016	Calle Siete	Crystal

== Other appearances ==
Sandy became the youngest of 5 celebrities who have won the one-million peso jackpot on the celebrity game show All Star K! when she sang Chaka Khan's song "Through the Fire".

== Awards and nominations ==
Year	Award	Category	Nominated work	Result
2013	Oaxaca International Film Festival	Outstanding Achievement in Acting	Lilet Never Happened	Won
2014	Jaipur International Film Festival	Best Actress	Lilet Never Happened	Won
