= Sisid =

2011 Philippine television drama series

- Title card
- Also known as: Pearl Diver
- Genre: Drama
- Written by: Maribel Ilag; Luningning Ribay
- Directed by: Ricky Davao
- Creative director: Jun Lana
- Starring: Jackie Rice
- Theme music composer: Roosevelt Ilum
- Opening theme: "Sa Piling Ko" by Julie Anne San Jose
- Country of origin: Philippines
- Original language: Tagalog
- No. of episodes: 79

Production
- Executive producer: Kaye Atienza-Cadsawan
- Editor: Eddie Esmedia
- Camera setup: Multiple-camera setup
- Running time: 30–45 minutes
- Production company: GMA Entertainment TV

Original release
- Network: GMA Network
- Release: May 30 – September 16, 2011

Sisid (transl. dive / international title: Pearl Diver) is a 2011 Philippine television drama series broadcast by GMA Network. Directed by Ricky Davao, it stars Jackie Rice. It premiered on May 30, 2011 on the network's Dramarama sa Hapon line up. The series concluded on September 16, 2011, with a total of 79 episodes.

== Cast and characters ==
Cast

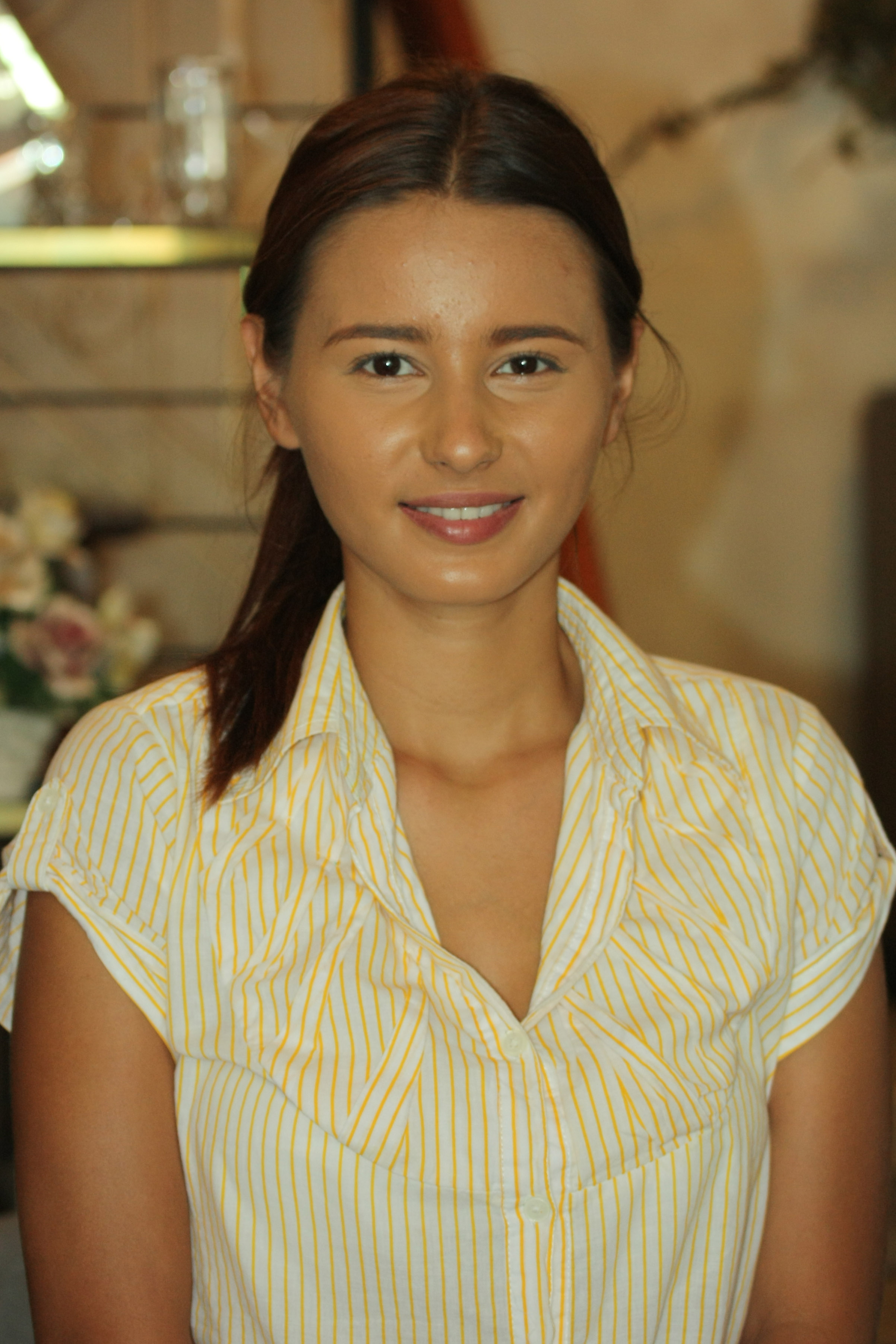
Jackie Rice

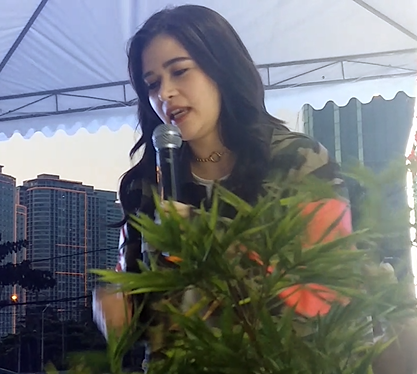
Bela Padilla

Lead cast

- Jackie Rice as Eden Cordelia / Pearl dela Vida

Supporting cast

- Dominic Roco as Sigfried Zaragoza
- JC Tiuseco as Ahmed
- Marco Alcaraz as Chad
- Rich Asuncion as Frida
- Bela Padilla as Monique
- Ian Batherson as Dexter
- Ynna Asistio as Gina
- Marc Acueza as Samuel Zaragoza
- Angelu de Leon as Alicia Cordelia
- Daniel Fernando as Hamil Cordelia
- Alicia Mayer as Alona Zaragoza
- Bembol Roco as Segismundo Zaragoza
- Maricar de Mesa as Perla
- Patricia Ysmael as Lovely
- Leo Martinez as Ramon dela Vida / Leo Sision
- Chanda Romero as L
- Lorenzo Mara as Akhim
- Bodjie Pascua as Ikong
- Mailes Kanapi as Mela
- Orlando Sol as Osama
- Ozu Ong as Toto
- Maria Rosario as Lira

Guest cast

- Cris Catagenas as a fisherman
- Mash Mojica as a fisherman
- Jeffrey Luna as a fisherman
- Enrico Reyes as a fisherman
- Romeo Edgar Abaygar as Nato
- Annie Revilla as a village woman
- Chie Nicdao-Alvear as a village woman

== Development ==
Maryo J. delos Reyes was hired as the director of the television series. He was later replaced by Ricky Davao.

== Production ==
Principal photography commenced on February 5, 2011.

== Ratings ==
According to AGB Nielsen Philippines' Mega Manila household television ratings, the pilot episode of Sisid earned a 17.9% rating. The final episode scored an 18.5% rating.

== Accolades ==
Accolades received by Sisid
Year	Award	Category	Recipient	Result	Ref.
2011	Golden Screen TV Awards	Outstanding Supporting Actress in a Drama Series	Angelu de Leon	Nominated	
