= Posh (2006 TV series) =

2006 Philippine television drama series

- Genre: Teen drama
- Directed by: Jay Altarejos
- Starring: Iwa Moto; Gian Carlos; Vaness del Moral
- Opening theme: "Nandito Lang Ako" by Soapdish
- Country of origin: Philippines
- Original language: Tagalog
- No. of seasons: 2
- No. of episodes: 27

Production
- Camera setup: Multiple-camera setup
- Running time: 60 minutes
- Production companies: GMA Entertainment TV; Viva Television

Original release
- Network: QTV
- Release: June 24 – December 23, 2006

Posh is a 2006 Philippine television teen drama series broadcast by QTV. Directed by Joselito Altarejos, it stars Iwa Moto, Gian Carlos and Vaness del Moral. It premiered on June 24, 2006. The series concluded on December 23, 2006, with a total of two seasons and 27 episodes.

== Cast ==
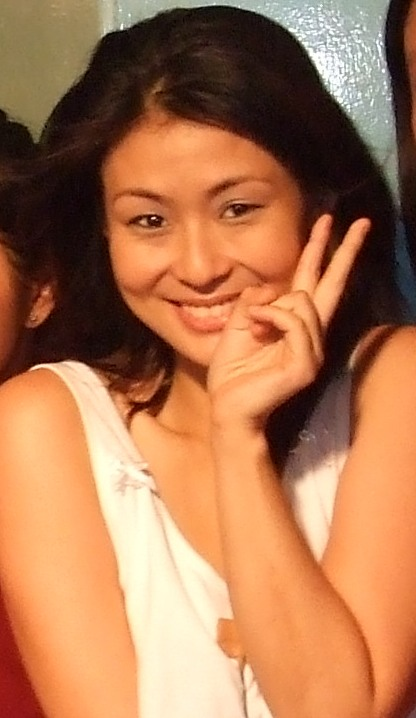
Iwa Moto stars.

- Iwa Moto
- Gian Carlos
- Vaness del Moral
- Vivo Ouano
- Rhea Nakpil
- Princess Violago
- PJ Valerio
- Ivan Carapiet
- Benjamin Alves
- Ashley Gruenberg
- Hayca Bunevacz
- Nikki Bacolod

== Production ==
Principal photography concluded on November 29, 2006.

== Accolades ==
Accolades received by Posh
Year	Award	Category	Recipient	Result	Ref.
2007	21st PMPC Star Awards for Television	Best Youth-Oriented Program	Posh	Nominated	
