= Codename: Asero =

2008 Philippine television drama series

- Title card
- Genre: Science fiction drama; Action
- Developed by: R.J. Nuevas
- Written by: R.J. Nuevas; Suzette Doctolero; Christina Velasco; Jules Katanyag
- Directed by: Mark A. Reyes V; Mike Tuviera
- Starring: Richard Gutierrez
- Theme music composer: Janno Gibbs; Tats Faustino
- Ending theme: "Asero" by Janno Gibbs
- Country of origin: Philippines
- Original language: Tagalog
- No. of episodes: 90

Production
- Executive producers: Angie C. Castrence; Carol Celino-Reyes
- Production locations: Metro Manila, Philippines; United Arab Emirates
- Camera setup: Multiple-camera setup
- Running time: 19–50 minutes
- Production company: GMA Entertainment TV

Original release
- Network: GMA Network
- Release: July 14 – November 14, 2008

Codename: Asero (transl. codename: steel) is a 2008 Philippine television drama science fiction action series broadcast by GMA Network. Directed by Mark A. Reyes V and Mike Tuviera, it stars Richard Gutierrez in the title role. It premiered on July 14, 2008 on the network's Telebabad line up. The series concluded on November 14, 2008, with a total of 90 episodes.

The series is streaming online on YouTube.

== Cast and characters ==
Cast

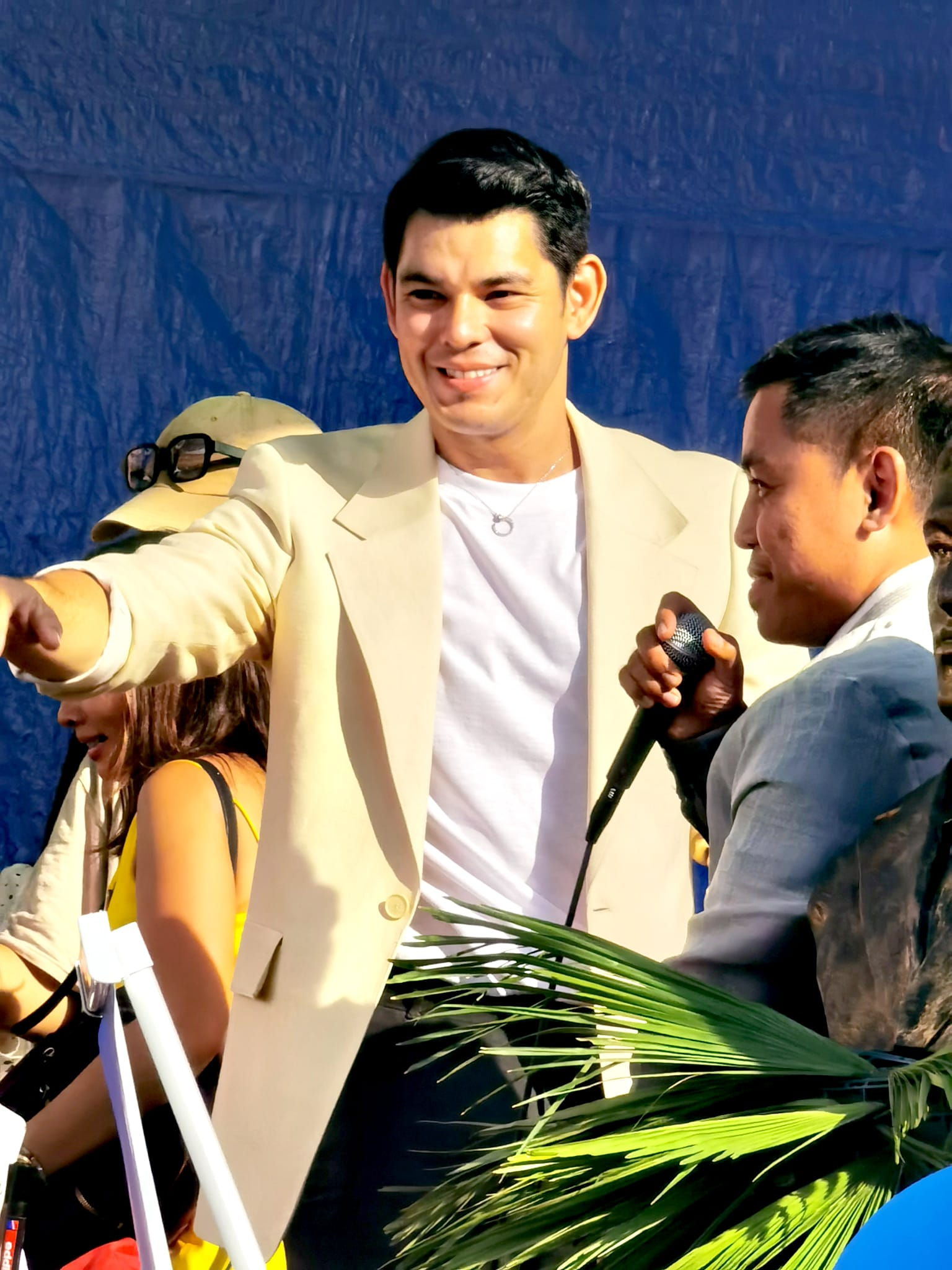
Richard Gutierrez

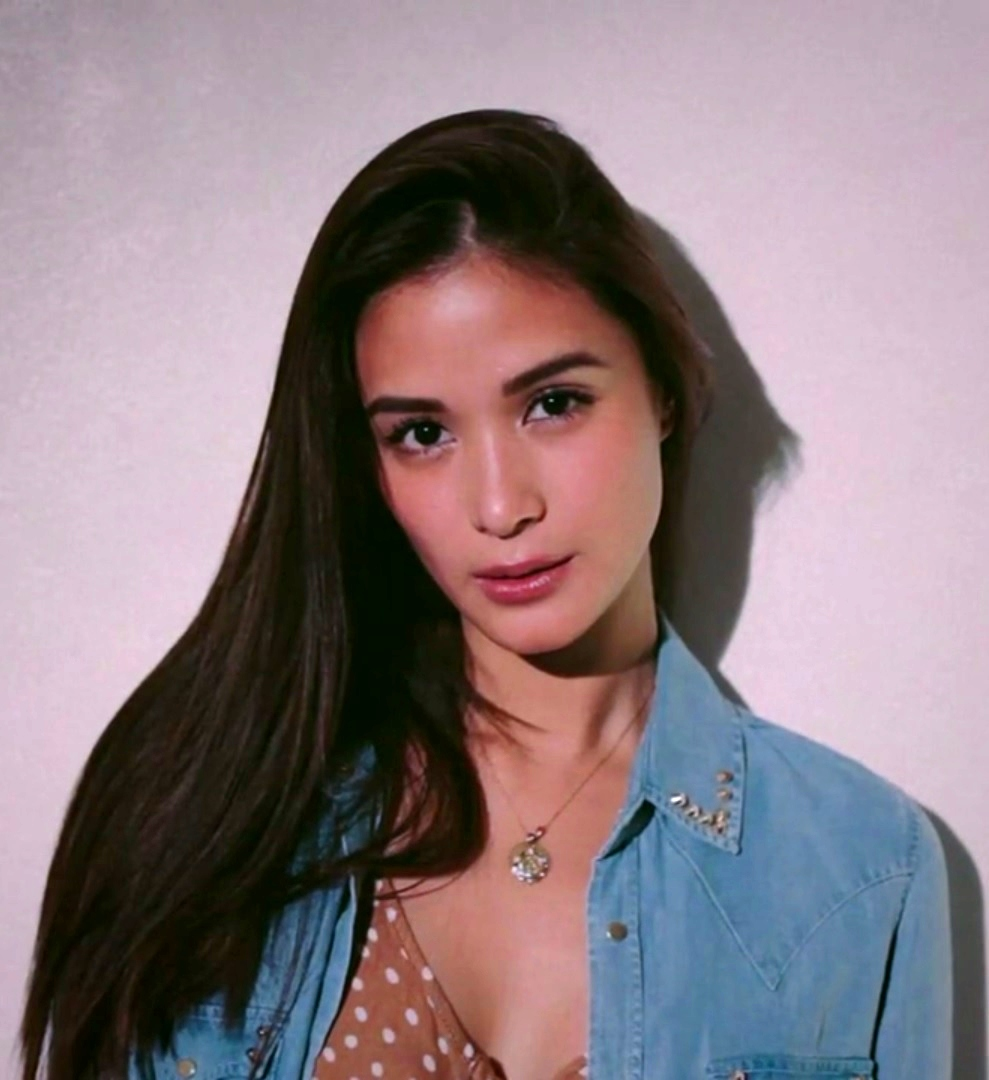
Heart Evangelista

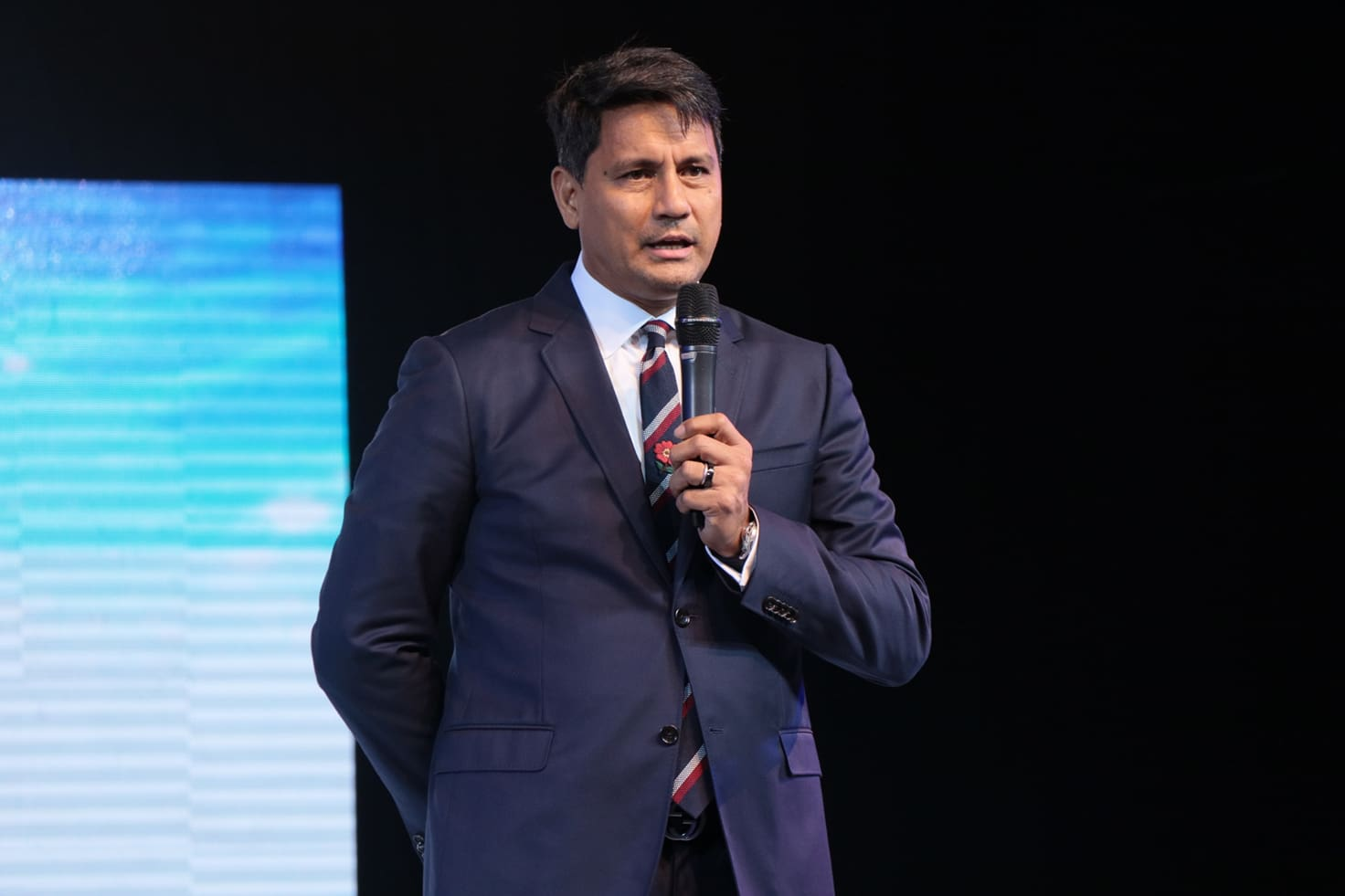
Richard Gomez

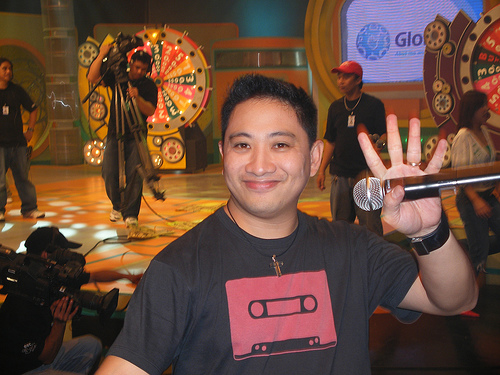
Michael V.

Lead cast

- Richard Gutierrez as Grecko Abesamis / Phoenix / Asero

Supporting cast

- Heart Evangelista as Emily San Juan
- Richard Gomez as Ibsen Abesamis / Zeus
- Janno Gibbs as Geron Aguilar / Rock Star
- Michael V. as Bodjie X
- Paolo Contis as Dave Aviejo
- Carmina Villarroel as Lady Q
- Rhian Ramos as Claire Morales
- Ehra Madrigal as Dayze Tagimoro
- Caridad Sanchez as Bertita
- Ramon Christopher as Apollo
- Francine Prieto as Aureana
- Bobby Andrews as Jupiter
- Chynna Ortaleza as Fran Guevarra
- Marky Cielo as Troy Motimor / Beat Box
- Rainier Castillo as Ricky San Juan
- Elvis Gutierrez as Vladimir
- Joanne Quintas as Gelyn Abesamis
- Bubbles Paraiso as Minnie
- Chariz Solomon as Gigi
- Rocky Gutierrez as Felix / Mercury
- Shyr Valdez as Delia San Juan
- Martin delos Santos as Tantam
- Ysa Villar as Perchy
- Jenny Miller as Greta
- Sheree as Malta
- Lovely Rivero as Myra
- Ana Roces as Ellen
- Sandy Talag as Sophie
- Pen Medina as Tagimoro
- Isay Alvarez as Minerva
- Mike Gayoso as Aris
- Jana Roxas as Mia
- Anthony Labrusca as Junic
- Mike Magat as Roboticman

Guest cast

- Schai Sigrist as Pigtails
- Karen delos Reyes as Cleo

== Production ==
Principal photography commenced on May 11, 2008. Filming concluded in November 2008.

== Ratings ==
According to AGB Nielsen Philippines' Mega Manila household television ratings, the pilot episode of Codename: Asero earned a 40.1% rating. The final episode scored a 32.5% rating.

== Accolades ==
Accolades received by Codename: Asero
Year	Award	Category	Recipient	Result	Ref.
2009	23rd PMPC Star Awards for Television	Best Primetime Drama Series	Codename: Asero	Nominated	
