= StarStruck season 3 =

Season of a Philippine television reality show

StarStruck
- Season 3
- Title card 2005
- No. of episodes: 77

Release
- Original network: GMA Network
- Original release: November 28, 2005 – March 12, 2006

Season chronology
- ← Previous; Season 2 Next → Season 4

The third season of StarStruck, also known as StarStruck: The Nationwide Invasion, is a Philippine television reality talent competition show, was broadcast on GMA Network. Hosted by Dingdong Dantes, Jolina Magdangal and Raymond Gutierrez, it premiered on November 28, 2005. The council was composed of Joey de Leon, Louie Ignacio and Lorna Tolentino. The season ended with 77 episodes on March 12, 2006, having Marky Cielo and Jackie Rice as the Ultimate Survivors.

== Overview ==
The third season of StarStruck was announced, the return of their reality-based talent show on GMA Network's variety program, SOP, where the hosts invited teenagers from 15 to 18 years old to audition for the upcoming season. Much of the auditions were held at the GMA Network's headquarters and at SM Supermalls throughout the Philippines.

The pilot episode was aired on December 5, 2005. Out of numerous who auditioned nationwide, only fourteen will have the chance to survive. If in the first and two seasons, StarStruck is shown only weekdays having Fridays as elimination night, this season Mondays to Fridays will be tests and Sundays would be the elimination night. The show held its the Final Judgment on March 12, 2006, at the Marikina Sports Complex.

== Selection process ==
In the third year of the reality-talent search, Out of numerous who auditioned nationwide, only the Top 100 was chosen for the first cut. From the Top 100, it was trimmed down to the Top 60, then from the Top 60 to the Top 43, then from the Top 43 to the Top 20, and from the Top 20 hopefuls. This batch was trimmed down to Top 20 hopefuls, from Top 20 finalists were reduced to Top 16 finalists and they formed the final fourteen finalists.

The Final 14 underwent various workshops and training in order to develop their personalities, talents, and charisma. But, the twist is that every week, one or two hopefuls from the final fourteen may have to say goodbye until only four remain. Those who were eliminated were dubbed as StarStruck Avengers.

The Final 4 will vie for the coveted Ultimate Male Survivor and Ultimate Female Survivor titles, both of them will received P1,000,000 pesos each plus and an exclusive management contract from GMA Network. This time, from the two Ultimate Survivors, the highest votes will be an Ultimate Sole Survivor title, has received a house and lot prize worth P2,500,000, an additional P300,000 in cash, and a business package worth P1,500,000 pesos each.

The First Prince and First Princess, both of them will received P250,000 pesos each plus and an exclusive management contract from the network. The StarStruck Avengers (the losing contestants) also received an exclusive contract from the network.

It also featured new ultimate title in StarStruck History, the Ultimate Sole Survivor and the two runners-up coveted to the First Prince and First Princess in the Final Judgment Night.

== Hopefuls ==
The introduction of the Top 20 dreamers revealed, for this season, instead of having just the traditional final fourteen, there will be the final twenty Survivors who will compete in various challenges. The hopefuls who will standout and survive these challenges will be part of the final fourteen.

When the Final 14 was chosen, they are assigned to different challenges every week that will hone their acting, singing, and dancing abilities. Every Friday, one is meant to leave the competition until there were just six others who are left. From survivor six, there will be two of them who will be eliminated and after the elimination of the two; the final four will be revealed.

The Final 4 will be battling with each other on the Final Judgment. People will choose who they want to win the competition by online voting and text voting. 30% of the result will come from the online and text votes and the remaining 70% is from the council.

=== Controversy ===
A controversial incident happened in the sixth week of this season. The council member, Louie Ignacio revealed that someone from the remaining survivors had opened a confidential file on the show's computer and had subsequently told the other finalists about the next challenges the show has in store for them. Those implicated were Sara Larsson, Jackie Rice and Jana Roxas. Sara Larsson eventually ousted as the fifth finalist to bid the contest goodbye. But even with Sara Larsson eliminated, the issue did not die but grew into a big controversy with more shocking revelations and crying bouts. Jackie Rice and Jana Roxas accused another survivor, Arci Muñoz of lying. The show aired footage captured by surveillance cameras showing the girls taking turns at the computer, but they all denied opening the confidential file in question. On the seventh week, the avenger Sara Larsson was given time to reveal her side of the story. On that same night, Arci Muñoz was eliminated.

Color key:

Male contestant
Female contestant
Semi-finalist
Finalist
Runner-up
Winner

| Place | Contestant | Age | Hometown | Exit | Result |
|---|---|---|---|---|---|
| 1 | Marky Cielo | 17 | Bauko, Mountain Province | March 12, 2006 | Ultimate Sole Survivor Ultimate Male Survivor |
| 2 | Jackie Rice | 15 | Olongapo, Zambales | March 12, 2006 | Ultimate Female Survivor |
| 3 | Gian Carlos | 16 | Iloilo City | March 12, 2006 | First Prince |
| 4 | Iwa Moto | 17 | Las Piñas | March 12, 2006 | First Princess |
| 5 | Chuck Allie | 17 | Davao City | February 26, 2006 | Avenger |
| 6 | Jana Roxas | 15 | Tarlac | February 26, 2006 | Avenger |
| 7 | Vivo Ouano | 15 | Quezon City | February 5, 2006 | Avenger |
| 8 | Bugz Daigo | 18 | Cebu City | February 5, 2006 | Avenger |
| 9 | Arci Muñoz | 16 | Antipolo, Rizal | January 22, 2006 | Avenger |
| 10 | Sara Larsson | 17 | Iloilo City | January 15, 2006 | Avenger |
| 11 | Rea Nakpil | 16 | San Mateo, Rizal | January 8, 2006 | Avenger |
| 12 | Johan Santos | 18 | Quezon City | January 1, 2006 | Avenger |
| 13 | Vaness del Moral | 17 | Baguio, Benguet | December 25, 2005 | Avenger |
| 14 | Jeric Rizalado | 17 | San Juan | December 18, 2005 | Avenger |
| 15 | Bea dela Fuente | 16 | Davao City | December 11, 2005 | Top 16 |
| 16 | Jay-L Dizon | 16 | Angeles, Pampanga | December 11, 2005 | Top 16 |
| 17 | Jom Gonzales | 18 | Cabanatuan, Nueva Ecija | December 4, 2005 | Top 20 |
| 18 | Kimber Guevarra | 18 | Tarlac | December 4, 2005 | Top 20 |
| 19 | Don-B Manalo | 17 | Parañaque | December 4, 2005 | Top 20 |
| 20 | Di Queblawi | 18 | Quezon City | December 4, 2005 | Top 20 |

== Weekly Artista Tests ==
Color key:

| Contestant with the Challenge Winner |
| Contestant was saved by the Public Vote and Council Vote |
| Contestant was in the Bottom Group |
| Contestant was Eliminated |
| Contestant was in the Circle 16 |
| Contestant was in the Final 14 and Final 4 |
| Contestant was advanced to the Grand Finals |
| Contestant was the Runner-up |
| Contestant was the Winner |

Week 1: The Top 20 hopefuls, were reduced to the Circle 16 hopefuls.

  - Challenge Winner: Not Awarded

| Contestant | Result |
|---|---|
| Bugz Daigo | Circle 16 |
| Chuck Allie | Circle 16 |
| Don-B Manalo | Eliminated |
| Gian Carlos | Circle 16 |
| Jay-L Dizon | Circle 16 |
| Jeric Rizalado | Circle 16 |
| Johan Santos | Circle 16 |
| Jom Gonzales | Eliminated |
| Marky Cielo | Circle 16 |
| Vivo Ouano | Circle 16 |

| Contestant | Result |
|---|---|
| Arci Muñoz | Circle 16 |
| Bea dela Fuente | Circle 16 |
| Bea dela Fuente | Eliminated |
| Iwa Moto | Circle 16 |
| Jackie Rice | Circle 16 |
| Jana Roxas | Circle 16 |
| Kimber Guevarra | Eliminated |
| Rea Nakpil | Circle 16 |
| Sara Larsson | Circle 16 |
| Vaness del Moral | Circle 16 |

Week 2: The Circle 16 hopefuls, the official Final 14 hopefuls have been chosen.

  - Challenge Winner Contestant: Not Awarded

| Contestant | Result |
|---|---|
| Bugz Daigo | Final 14 |
| Chuck Allie | Final 14 |
| Gian Carlos | Final 14 |
| Jay-L Dizon | Eliminated |
| Jeric Rizalado | Final 14 |
| Johan Santos | Final 14 |
| Marky Cielo | Final 14 |
| Vivo Ouano | Final 14 |

| Contestant | Result |
|---|---|
| Arci Muñoz | Final 14 |
| Diana Qeblawi | Eliminated |
| Iwa Moto | Final 14 |
| Jackie Rice | Final 14 |
| Jana Roxas | Final 14 |
| Rea Nakpil | Final 14 |
| Sara Larsson | Final 14 |
| Vaness del Moral | Final 14 |

Week 3: The Final 14 hopefuls.

  - Challenge Winner Contestant: Not Awarded

| Contestant | Result |
|---|---|
| Bugz Daigo | Safe |
| Chuck Allie | Safe |
| Gian Carlos | Safe |
| Jeric Rizalado | Eliminated |
| Johan Santos | Safe |
| Marky Cielo | Safe |
| Vivo Ouano | Safe |

| Contestant | Result |
|---|---|
| Arci Muñoz | Safe |
| Iwa Moto | Safe |
| Jackie Rice | Safe |
| Jana Roxas | Safe |
| Rea Nakpil | Bottom 3 |
| Sara Larsson | Safe |
| Vaness del Moral | Bottom 3 |

Week 4: The Final 13 hopefuls.

| Contestant | Result |
|---|---|
| Bugz Daigo | Safe |
| Chuck Allie | Safe |
| Gian Carlos | Challenge Winner |
| Johan Santos | Safe |
| Marky Cielo | Safe |
| Vivo Ouano | Safe |

| Contestant | Result |
|---|---|
| Arci Muñoz | Safe |
| Iwa Moto | Safe |
| Jackie Rice | Challenge Winner |
| Jana Roxas | Bottom 3 |
| Rea Nakpil | Safe |
| Sara Larsson | Bottom 3 |
| Vaness del Moral | Eliminated |

Week 5: The Final 12 hopefuls.

| Contestant | Result |
|---|---|
| Bugz Daigo | Bottom 4 |
| Chuck Allie | Challenge Winner |
| Gian Carlos | Safe |
| Johan Santos | Eliminated |
| Marky Cielo | Safe |
| Vivo Ouano | Safe |

| Contestant | Result |
|---|---|
| Arci Muñoz | Safe |
| Iwa Moto | Challenge Winner |
| Jackie Rice | Safe |
| Jana Roxas | Safe |
| Rea Nakpil | Bottom 4 |
| Sara Larsson | Bottom 4 |

Week 6: The Final 11 hopefuls.

| Contestant | Result |
|---|---|
| Bugz Daigo | Safe |
| Chuck Allie | Challenge Winner |
| Gian Carlos | Bottom 3 |
| Marky Cielo | Safe |
| Vivo Ouano | Safe |

| Contestant | Result |
|---|---|
| Arci Muñoz | Safe |
| Iwa Moto | Challenge Winner |
| Jackie Rice | Safe |
| Jana Roxas | Safe |
| Rea Nakpil | Eliminated |
| Sara Larsson | Bottom 3 |

Week 7: The Final 10 hopefuls. First week of the Computer Controversy.

| Contestant | Result |
|---|---|
| Bugz Daigo | Safe |
| Chuck Allie | Safe |
| Gian Carlos | Safe |
| Marky Cielo | Challenge Winner |
| Vivo Ouano | Safe |

| Contestant | Result |
|---|---|
| Arci Muñoz | Safe |
| Iwa Moto | Safe |
| Jackie Rice | Bottom 3 |
| Jana Roxas | Bottom 3 |
| Sara Larsson | Eliminated |

Week 8: The Final 9 hopefuls. Second week of the Computer Controversy.

| Contestant | Result |
|---|---|
| Bugz Daigo | Safe |
| Chuck Allie | Safe |
| Gian Carlos | Safe |
| Marky Cielo | Challenge Winner |
| Vivo Ouano | Safe |

| Contestant | Result |
|---|---|
| Arci Muñoz | Eliminated |
| Iwa Moto | Bottom 4 |
| Jackie Rice | Bottom 4 |
| Jana Roxas | Bottom 4 |

Week 9: The Final 8 hopefuls. Avengers versus Survivors.

  - Challenge Winner Contestant: Not Awarded
  - Eliminated Contestant: None

| Contestant | Result |
|---|---|
| Bugz Daigo | Safe |
| Chuck Allie | Bottom 4 |
| Gian Carlos | Safe |
| Marky Cielo | Bottom 4 |
| Vivo Ouano | Safe |

| Contestant | Result |
|---|---|
| Iwa Moto | Bottom 4 |
| Jackie Rice | Safe |
| Jana Roxas | Bottom 4 |

Week 10: The Final 8 hopefuls.

  - Challenge Winner Contestant: Not Awarded

| Contestant | Result |
|---|---|
| Bugz Daigo | Eliminated |
| Chuck Allie | Bottom 5 |
| Gian Carlos | Bottom 5 |
| Marky Cielo | Bottom 5 |
| Vivo Ouano | Eliminated |

| Contestant | Result |
|---|---|
| Iwa Moto | Safe |
| Jackie Rice | Safe |
| Jana Roxas | Safe |

Week 11: The Survivor 6 hopefuls.

  - Challenge Winner Contestant: Not Awarded
  - Eliminated Contestant: None

| Contestant | Result |
|---|---|
| Chuck Allie | Safe |
| Gian Carlos | Safe |
| Marky Cielo | Safe |

| Contestant | Result |
|---|---|
| Iwa Moto | Safe |
| Jackie Rice | Safe |
| Jana Roxas | Safe |

Week 12: The Survivor 6 hopefuls.

  - Challenge Winner Contestant: Not Awarded
  - Eliminated Contestant: None

| Contestant | Result |
|---|---|
| Chuck Allie | Bottom 6 |
| Gian Carlos | Bottom 6 |
| Marky Cielo | Bottom 6 |

| Contestant | Result |
|---|---|
| Iwa Moto | Bottom 6 |
| Jackie Rice | Bottom 6 |
| Jana Roxas | Bottom 6 |

Week 13: The Survivor 6 hopefuls, the official Final 4 hopefuls have been chosen.

  - Challenge Winner: Not Awarded

| Contestant | Result |
|---|---|
| Chuck Allie | Eliminated |
| Gian Carlos | Final 4 |
| Marky Cielo | Final 4 |

| Contestant | Result |
|---|---|
| Iwa Moto | Final 4 |
| Jackie Rice | Final 4 |
| Jana Roxas | Eliminated |

Week 14: The Final 4 Homecoming

| Contestant | Result |
|---|---|
| Iwa Moto | Advanced |
| Jackie Rice | Advanced |

| Contestant | Result |
|---|---|
| Gian Carlos | Advanced |
| Marky Cielo | Advanced |

Week 15: The Final Judgment, the Ultimate Survivors have been proclaimed.

| Contestant | Result |
|---|---|
| Gian Carlos | First Prince |
| Marky Cielo | Ultimate Male Survivor |

| Contestant | Result |
|---|---|
| Iwa Moto | First Princess |
| Jackie Rice | Ultimate Female Survivor |

  - The Ultimate Survivors: The highest title has been proclaimed.

| Contestant / Result; Marky Cielo / Ultimate Sole Survivor | Contestant / Result; Jackie Rice / Ultimate Female Survivor |

== Final Judgment ==
The winner was announced on a two-hour TV special dubbed as StarStruck The Nationwide Invasion: The Final Judgment was held live on March 12, 2006, at the Marikina Sports Complex, the biggest venue in StarStruck history to avoid the recent Wowowee Stampede Tragedy in Philsport Arena where almost 200,000 attended in arena designed to accommodate 10,000 only. 10,000 spectators attended.

The opening dance number, together with this season's avengers, and they were joined by this final four and the graduates from the previous season. Hosted by Dingdong Dantes, Jolina Magdangal and Raymond Gutierrez. The council was formed with Joey de Leon, Louie Ignacio and Lorna Tolentino.

Before the performance of the final four, they were joined onstage by first the male graduates, Mark Herras, Rainier Castillo, Mike Tan and CJ Muere performs a dance number along with the male survivors, Gian Carlos and Marky Cielo the dance number song of Y-Not's Average Joe and Soul Control's Hello, Hello Hey, with the Abstract Dancers and G-MIC Dancers.

And next is the female graduates, Jennylyn Mercado, Yasmien Kurdi, Ryza Cenon and LJ Reyes performs a dance number along with the female survivors, Iwa Moto and Jackie Rice the dance number song of Elvis Presley Rubber Necking and Aryanna's Bop It, with the Abstract Dancers and G-MIC Dancers.

Jolina Magdangal sing and signature dance performing, the dance hits, together with the avengers performs a signature dance, Step Into The Rhythm signature dance for the first season avengers, Soul Control's Chocolatte signature dance for the second season avengers, and DJ Trix's I Like You signature dance for this season's avengers with the Abstract Dancers and G-MIC Dancers.

The final four perform their solo performances. Iwa Moto a dance number song of ?'s ?, Jackie Rice a dance number song of ?'s ?, Gian Carlos a dance number song of ?'s ? and Marky Cielo a dance number song of Y-Not's Favourite Son, performs a solo dance number with the Steved Groups and Kids@Work.

The avengers' performance came in next, in a song and dance medley detailing the journey of the survivors from the audition process, the four International contenders and the elimination of the tenth avengers for a dance number. Before the winners were Announced, Janno Gibbs and Jennylyn Mercado sang Moments of Love, from the film soundtrack of Moments of Love.

Announcement come, Jackie Rice of Olongapo, Zambales is the Ultimate Female Survivor and Marky Cielo of Bauko, Mountain Province is the Ultimate Male Survivor were proclaimed as the Ultimate Survivors, each of them received P1,000,000 pesos each plus and an exclusive management contract from GMA Network worth P2,000,000 pesos each.

While, Iwa Moto of Las Piñas is the First Princess and Gian Carlos of Iloilo City is the First Prince were proclaimed as the runner-ups, each of them received P250,000 cash each plus and an exclusive management contract from the network. The StarStruck Avengers (the losing contestants) also received an exclusive contract from the network.

And the first-ever Ultimate Sole Survivor won by Marky Cielo received a house and lot prize worth P2,500,000, an additional P300,000 in cash, and a business package worth P1,500,000 pesos each. The Final Judgment gained 32.7% rating.

== Homecoming: A StarStruck Special ==
This season of the final four were given their own TV special entitled Homecoming: A StarStruck Special which was aired on April 23, 2006. In the special with, Marky Cielo, Jackie Rice, Gian Carlos and Iwa Moto went back to their respective hometowns where they were treated accordingly as VIPs in their respective home provinces. Apart from that, there were several revelations from the final four as far as their lives were concerned.

== TV Assignment ==
For their first TV Assignment, the final four Marky Cielo, Jackie Rice, Gian Carlos and Iwa Moto with the avengers Chuck Allie, Jana Roxas and Vaness del Moral. headlined one of the episodes of Love To Love (Season 10) presents: Young At Hearts. They co-starred with Leo Martinez and Luz Valdez.

== Signature dances ==
There are signature dances and songs made in each batch. With this batch, their signature dances and songs are:

- I Like You
- Wait A Minute
- L.O.V.E.
- Chicken Noodle Soup
- Favorite Son

== Elimination chart ==
Color key:

Male contestant
Female contestant
Semi-finalist
Circle 16
Final 14 and Final 4
Challenge Winner
Safe
Bottom Group
Advanced
Eliminated
Finalist
Runner-up
Winner

Results per public and council votes
| Place | Contestant | Top 20 (Week 1) | Top 16 (Week 2) | Top 14 (Week 3) | Top 13 (Week 4) | Top 12 (Week 5) | Top 11 (Week 6) | Top 10 (Week 7) | Top 9 (Week 8) | Top 8 (Week 9-10) | | Top 6 (Week 11-13) | | | Top 4 (Week 14-15) | |
| Place | Contestant | 12/4/05 ^{1} | 12/11/05 ^{2} | 12/18/05 | 12/25/05 | 1/1/06 | 1/8/06 | 1/15/06 ^{3} | 1/22/06 ^{4} | 1/29/06 ^{5} | 2/5/06 ^{6} | 2/12/06 ^{7} | 2/19/06 ^{8} | 2/26/06 ^{9} | 3/5/06 | 3/12/06 ^{10} |
|---|---|---|---|---|---|---|---|---|---|---|---|---|---|---|---|---|
| 1–4 | Marky Cielo | Circle 16 | Final 14 | Safe | Safe | Safe | Safe | Challenge Winner | Challenge Winner | Bottom 4 | Bottom 5 | Safe | Bottom 6 | Final 4 | Advanced | Ultimate Sole Survivor Ultimate Male Survivor |
| 1–4 | Jackie Rice | Circle 16 | Final 14 | Safe | Challenge Winner | Safe | Safe | Bottom 3 | Bottom 4 | Safe | Safe | Safe | Bottom 6 | Final 4 | Advanced | Ultimate Female Survivor |
| 1–4 | Gian Carlos | Circle 16 | Final 14 | Safe | Challenge Winner | Safe | Bottom 3 | Safe | Safe | Safe | Bottom 5 | Safe | Bottom 6 | Final 4 | Advanced | First Prince |
| 1–4 | Iwa Moto | Circle 16 | Final 14 | Safe | Safe | Challenge Winner | Challenge Winner | Safe | Bottom 4 | Bottom 4 | Safe | Safe | Bottom 6 | Final 4 | Advanced | First Princess |
| 5–6 | Chuck Allie | Circle 16 | Final 14 | Safe | Safe | Challenge Winner | Challenge Winner | Safe | Safe | Bottom 4 | Bottom 5 | Safe | Bottom 6 | Eliminated | | Avenger |
| 5–6 | Jana Roxas | Circle 16 | Final 14 | Safe | Bottom 3 | Safe | Safe | Bottom 3 | Bottom 4 | Bottom 4 | Safe | Safe | Bottom 6 | Eliminated | | Avenger |
| 7–8 | Vivo Ouano | Circle 16 | Final 14 | Safe | Safe | Safe | Safe | Safe | Safe | Safe | Eliminated | | | | | Avenger |
| 7–8 | Bugz Daigo | Circle 16 | Final 14 | Safe | Safe | Bottom 4 | Safe | Safe | Safe | Safe | Eliminated | | | | | Avenger |
| 9 | Arci Muñoz | Circle 16 | Final 14 | Safe | Safe | Safe | Safe | Safe | Eliminated | | | | | | | Avenger |
| 10 | Sara Larsson | Circle 16 | Final 14 | Safe | Bottom 3 | Bottom 4 | Bottom 3 | Eliminated | | | | | | | | Avenger |
| 11 | Rea Nakpil | Circle 16 | Final 14 | Bottom 3 | Safe | Bottom 4 | Eliminated | | | | | | | | | Avenger |
| 12 | Johan Santos | Circle 16 | Final 14 | Safe | Safe | Eliminated | | | | | | | | | | Avenger |
| 13 | Vaness del Moral | Circle 16 | Final 14 | Bottom 3 | Eliminated | | | | | | | | | | | Avenger |
| 14 | Jeric Rizalado | Circle 16 | Final 14 | Eliminated | | | | | | | | | | | | Avenger |
| 15–16 | Bea dela Fuente | Circle 16 | Eliminated | | | | | | | | | | | | | Top 16 |
| 15–16 | Jay-L Dizon | Circle 16 | Eliminated | | | | | | | | | | | | | Top 16 |
| 17–20 | Jom Gonzales | Eliminated | | | | | | | | | | | | | | Top 20 |
| 17–20 | Kimber Guevarra | Eliminated | | | | | | | | | | | | | | Top 20 |
| 17–20 | Don-B Manalo | Eliminated | | | | | | | | | | | | | | Top 20 |
| 17–20 | Di Queblawi | Eliminated | | | | | | | | | | | | | | Top 20 |

=== Notes ===
1. The Top 20 were reduced to the Circle 16 was chosen on December 4, 2005.
2. The final fourteen was chosen on December 11, 2005.
3. Jackie Rice and Jana Roxas accused another survivor, Arci Muñoz, of lying. The show aired footage captured by surveillance cameras showing the girls taking turns at the StarStruck computer, but they all denied opening the confidential file in question. Sara Larsson was eliminated on January 15, 2006.
4. The seventh week the fifth avenger Sara Larsson was given time to reveal her side of the story. Arci Muñoz was eliminated on January 22, 2006.
5. It was a non-elimination week. The bottom group are Chuck Allie, Iwa Moto, Marky Cielo and Jana Roxas, but next week the two survivors were eliminated from the competition on February 5, 2006.
6. It was a double-elimination week. The bottom group are Bugz Daigo, Chuck Allie, Gian Carlos, Marky Cielo and Vivo Ouano. The first called to eliminated is Bugz Daigo and the second called is Vivo Ouano.
7. It was a non-elimination week. On February 12, 2006, the two hopefuls are possible were eliminated.
8. It was a non-elimination week. The bottom group are the remaining survivor six, was safe for the elimination on February 19, 2006.
9. The final four was chosen on February 26, 2006, And the last avengers are Jana Roxas and Chuck Allie. The first called to eliminated is Jana Roxas and the second called is Chuck Allie.
10. In the final judgment night, Marky Cielo and Jackie Rice were proclaimed as the Ultimate Survivors.
