= Marky Cielo =

Filipino actor and dancer (1988–2008)

- Born: Mark Angelo Cadaweng Cielo; May 12, 1988; Butuan, Agusan del Norte, Philippines
- Died: December 7, 2008 (aged 20); Antipolo, Rizal, Philippines
- Resting place: Bauko, Mountain Province, Philippines
- Other names: Boknoi; Kuya Marky
- Occupations: Actor, dancer
- Years active: 2005–2008

Mark Angelo "Marky" Cadaweng Cielo (May 12, 1988 – December 7, 2008) was a Filipino actor and dancer. The first known Igorot in Philippine showbiz, he rose to prominence after winning the third season of the reality talent competition StarStruck in 2006. During his two-year career, he appeared in several television shows and one film, notably Fantastikids (2006), Asian Treasures (2007), Boys Nxt Door (2007), Zaido: Pulis Pangkalawakan (2007–2008), Sine Novela: Kaputol ng Isang Awit (2008), and his final performance, LaLola (2008). He also voiced Ichigo Kurosaki in the Filipino dub of the Japanese anime series Bleach (2007).

== Early life ==
Mark Angelo Cadaweng Cielo, better known as Boknoi to his family and friends, was born on May 12, 1988, at Manuel J. Santos Hospital in Butuan in Agusan del Norte, where he lived with his mother, Mildred Ban-e.g. Cadaweng and sister, Marcel Andrea or "Bonsai". In 2001, he and his family moved to Bauko, Mountain Province to live with their other relatives, who are of Igorot descent. As a student of the local high school, San Isidro, he would soon become proud of his indigenous roots, despite being raised in the Roman Catholic environment. He fluently spoke Kankana-ey, a language spoken in the Cordilleras. Aside from this, he was also fluent in English, Ilocano, Tagalog, and Visayan languages (specifically Butuanon and Cebuano). According to an episode of Magpakailanman which revolved around life, his parents separated when he was still young and his mother took care of him, along with his sister on her own. Despite this, he was able to reunite with his father, Avelino "Bobby" Cielo, and spend time with him after many years. Later in his life, he had stated, privately, that he truly loves his father.

== Career ==
Prior to his career, Cielo was a freshman studying Architecture at Saint Louis University, Baguio in Benguet, where he was a member of SLU Dance Troupe. When his classmates and close friends convinced him to audition for Starstruck, he accepted so he joined under the stage name, Marky Cielo. He audition for Starstruck where he emerged as "Ultimate Male Survivor" and the first and only "Sole Survivor", defeating his fellow contestants Jackie Rice, Gian Carlos, Iwa Moto, Chuck Allie, and Arci Muñoz. He is the first Igorot ever to join a talent contest. He won 10 million pesos worth of prizes and an exclusive GMA talent management contract, and a house and lot in Antipolo, Rizal. He and his family moved to this new home only in 2008, during his birthday, May 12. Prior to that, he lived in Pasig.

Soon after winning StarStruck, Cielo made his debut as the lead role Daniel Trinidad in the fantasy television show, Fantastikids. After this, he began to appear in primetime with guest starring roles in shows first in Encantadia: Pag-ibig Hanggang Wakas as Arman, then Bakekang as Miguelito "Michael" Dimayacyac and Asian Treasures as Mateo Madrigal;, as well as a leading role in the Sunday afternoon drama, Boys Nxt Door, which is dubbed in Malay by 8TV and is to be the first Philippine drama to air on KBS2 of South Korea. In 2007, he and fellow StarStruck graduates, Yasmien Kurdi and Rainier Castillo decided to shift from mainstream acting to voice acting for a while by trying characters from the anime Bleach, such as Ichigo Kurosaki. During the same year, he won the Guillermo Mendoza Memorial Scholarship Foundation Award for Most Promising Male Artist. He was soon chosen by his network to be the main protagonist in the Philippine remake of Uchuu Keiji Shaider as Alexis del Mundo or Shaider but Dennis Trillo and Aljur Abrenica were included so the show was reformatted to Zaido: Pulis Pangkalawakan, a spin-off sequel to the Metal Hero Series. He joined the cast of Sine Novela: Kaputol ng Isang Awit, which also stars Glaiza de Castro, Lovi Poe and Jolo Revilla. He was also a spokesman for Department of Health and was seen in a no-smoking ad campaign with secretary Francisco Duque III. In 2008, he joined the cast of Codename: Asero then LaLola. His last appearance was in LaLola, in which he portrayed the character Billy Lobregat.

== Death ==
Cielo, 20, was found unconscious on December 7, 2008, by his mother. The night before, he was last seen playing an online video game up until 10 pm in an internet cafe in Quezon City. Cielo was said to have made several unanswered calls to his manager-mentor. When he arrived home, he had a discussion with his mother about "something personal". His mother advised him to sort out his problem saying that only he can solve his problems. The next morning, his mother entered his room in their house in Antipolo at around 6 AM to wake him up for a charity event. When he did not respond, she immediately rushed him to the nearby Antipolo Doctors Hospital where he was declared dead on arrival. Cielo's cause of death remains unclear.

His wake was held in his home for three days then his remains were brought to the Cathedral of the Resurrection in Baguio, where it stayed for a day. He was buried on December 15, in Bauko, Mountain Province, in his family's backyard according to traditional Kankanaey custom.

== Filmography ==
=== Film ===
Year	Title	Role
2006	Till I Met You	Bryan
2007	Batanes	
2008	Bleach: Memories of Nobody	Ichigo Kurosaki (voice)

=== Television ===
Year	Title	Role
2005–2006	StarStruck: The Nationwide Invasion	Himself, contestant / Ultimate Male/Sole Survivor
2006	Encantadia: Pag-ibig Hanggang Wakas	Arman, son of Odessa and Alexus (Ybrahim)
2006	Fantastikids	Daniel
2006–2007	Carlo J. Caparas' Bakekang	Michael
2007	Asian Treasures	Mateo Madrigal
2007–2008	Boys Nxt Door	Mario Alberto "Buboy" Almante
2007–2008	Zaido: Pulis Pangkalawakan	Alexis Lorenzo / Zaido Green / Sigma
2008	Joaquin Bordado	Young Joaquin Apacible / Young Joaquin Bordado
2008	Sine Novela: Kaputol ng Isang Awit	Eric Valderama
2008	Maynila	Guest
2008	Obra	Guest
2008	One Proud Mama	Featured guest
2008	Codename: Asero	Troy / Agent Beatbox
2008	Dear Friend	Jerome
2008	All Star K	Contestant
2008	LaLola	Billy Lobregat / Enrico
2008	Bleach	Ichigo Kurosaki

== Honors and awards ==
- Posthumously Celebrity Inductee Winner, Eastwood City Walk Of Fame Philippines 2009
- 21st and 22nd PMPC Star Awards for Television (won, 2007 & 2008)
- Guillermo Mendoza's Most Promising Male Star of 2007
- Candy Mag's 100 Candy Cuties (#17)
- Cosmopolitan Top 69 Bachelors
- Yes! Magazine's The next Big Thing
- Yes! Magazine's 100 Most Beautiful Stars Of 2007
- StarStruck's First and Only Ultimate Sole Survivor (2006)

Awards and achievements
Preceded by Mike Tan	StarStruck; 2005 (season 3)	Succeeded by Aljur Abrenica; Martin Escudero
