= Ikaw Sana =

Philippine television drama series

- Title card
- Also known as: To Love You
- Genre: Romantic drama
- Directed by: Joel Lamangan
- Starring: Jennylyn Mercado; Mark Herras; Pauleen Luna
- Theme music composer: Ogie Alcasid
- Opening theme: "Ikaw Sana" by Ogie Alcasid
- Country of origin: Philippines
- Original language: Tagalog
- No. of episodes: 100

Production
- Executive producer: Helen Rose S. Sese
- Camera setup: Multiple-camera setup
- Running time: 30–45 minutes
- Production company: GMA Entertainment TV

Original release
- Network: GMA Network
- Release: September 21, 2009 – February 5, 2010

Ikaw Sana (transl. hope it is you / international title: To Love You) is a Philippine television drama romance series broadcast by GMA Network. Directed by Joel Lamangan, it stars Jennylyn Mercado, Mark Herras and Pauleen Luna. It premiered on September 21, 2009, on the network's Telebabad line up. The series concluded on February 5, 2010, with a total of 100 episodes.

== Cast and characters ==
Cast

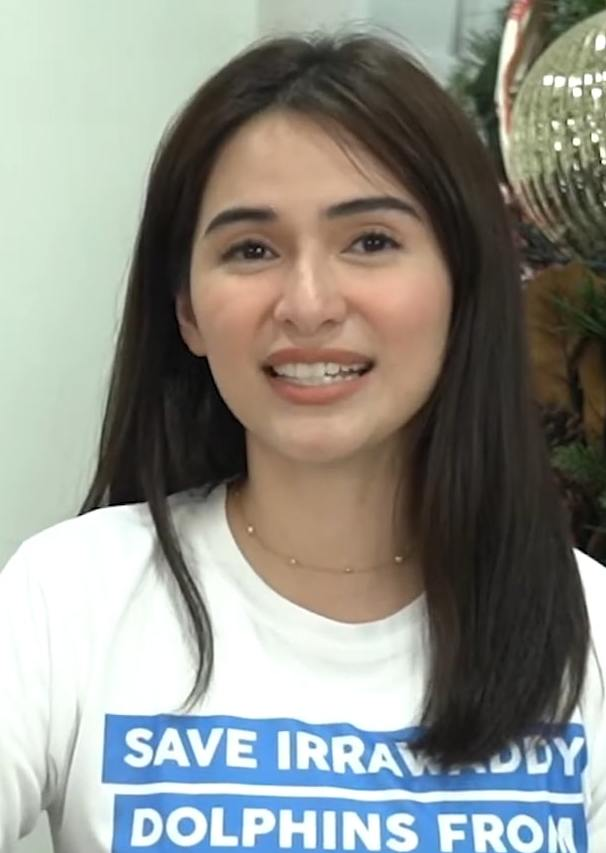
Jennylyn Mercado

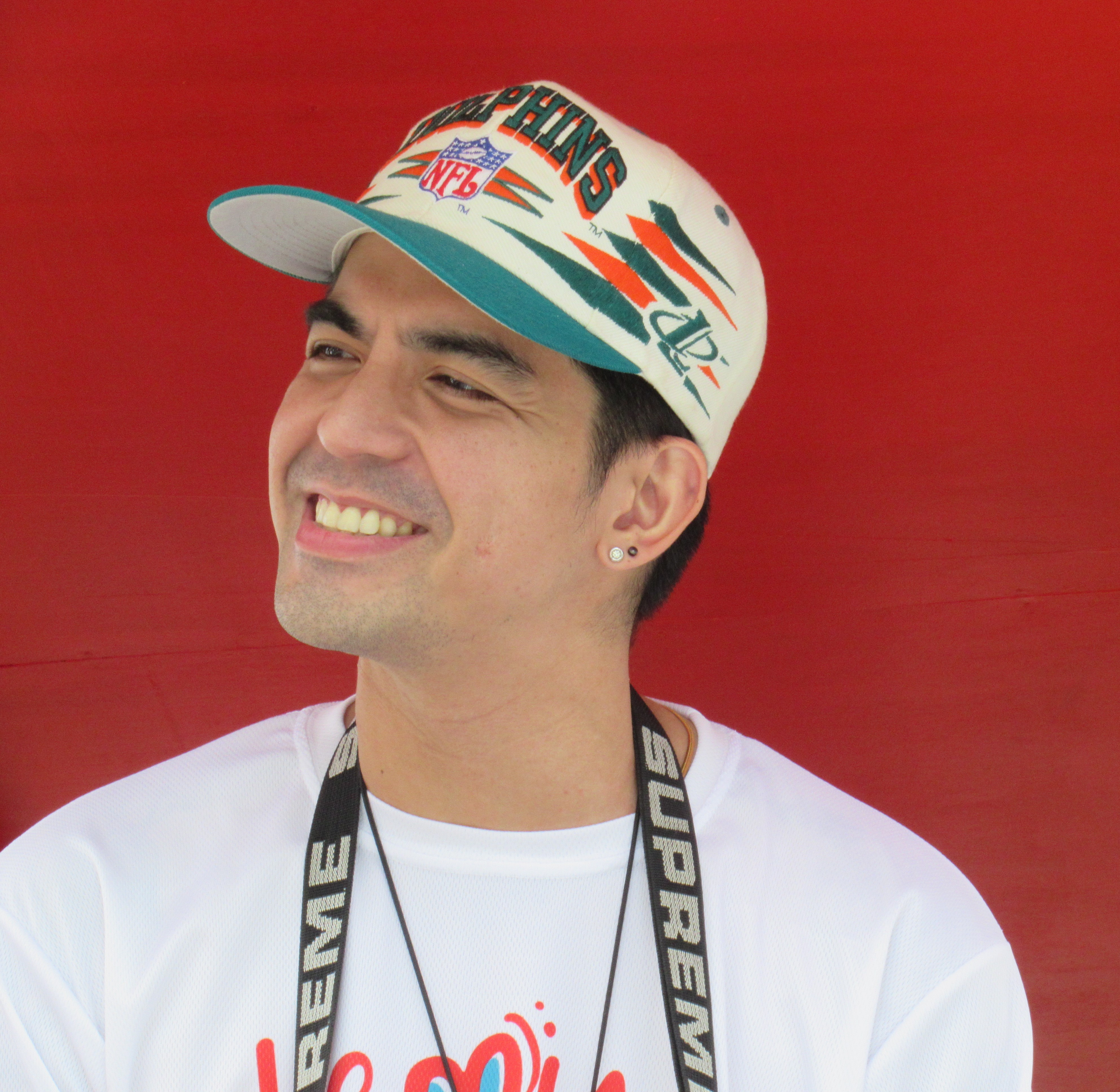
Mark Herras

Lead cast

- Jennylyn Mercado as Eliza Garcia / Eliza Montemayor-Olivarez
- Mark Herras as Michael Olivarez
- Pauleen Luna as Sofia Reyes / Montemayor-Olivarez

Supporting cast

- Tirso Cruz III as Gener Montemayor
- Maritoni Fernandez as Loreta Reyes-Montemayor
- Marissa Delgado as Amanda Montemayor
- Mariz Ricketts as Sonia Garcia
- Tony Mabesa as Ramon Olivarez
- Luz Valdez as Chabeng Mendez-Garcia
- Alicia Alonzo as Mameng
- Vaness del Moral as Lucia Mendez
- Arthur Solinap as Dave Arnaiz
- Vivo Ouano as Bobby
- Jana Roxas as Charlene
- Jim Pebanco
- Joey Paras as Afi

Guest cast

- Camille Prats as Giselle
- Zoren Legaspi as Enrico Santa Maria
- Frank Garcia as Luis
- Alliyah Fatima Dela Riva as Nina
- Byron Ortile as Georgie Lorenzo
- Sandy Talag as younger Eliza
- Miguel Tanfelix as younger Michael
- Charlotte Hermoso as younger Sofia
- Jace Flores as Carlo Arellano
- Pinky Marquez as Sylvia Arellano
- Gabriela Joson as younger Nina
- Richard Quan as Chen
- Harlene Bautista-Sarmenta as Jane

== Production ==
Principal photography concluded on January 29, 2010.

== Ratings ==
According to AGB Nielsen Philippines' Mega Manila household television ratings, the pilot episode of Ikaw Sana earned a 16% rating. The final episode scored a 21.1% rating.

== Accolades ==
Accolades received by Ikaw Sana
Year	Award	Category	Recipient	Result	Ref.
2010	24th PMPC Star Awards for Television	Best Primetime TV Series	Ikaw Sana	Nominated	
