= Love Bug (Philippine TV program) =

2010 Philippine television drama series

- Title card
- Genre: Drama; Romantic comedy
- Opening theme: "Lovebug" by Joshua Dionisio, Jake Vargas, Elmo Magalona and Six Feet Long
- Country of origin: Philippines
- Original language: Tagalog
- No. of episodes: 16

Production
- Production locations: Metro Manila, Philippines
- Camera setup: Multiple-camera setup
- Running time: 30–60 minutes
- Production company: GMA Entertainment TV

Original release
- Network: GMA Network
- Release: May 23 – September 19, 2010

Love Bug is a 2010 Philippine television drama romance anthology series broadcast by GMA Network. It premiered on May 23, 2010. The series concluded on September 19, 2010, with a total of 16 episodes.

== Cast and characters ==
"The Last Romance"

- Carla Abellana as Rackie
- Hero Dennis Trillo

"Exchange of Hearts"

- Diva Montelaba
- Sarah Lahbati
- Steven Silva
- Enzo Pineda

"Wish Come True"

- Rich Asuncion
- Chariz Solomon
- Daniel Matsunaga
- Kris Bernal

"Say I Do"

- Mark Anthony Fernandez as Alvin
- Lovi Poe as Faye

== Ratings ==
According to AGB Nielsen Philippines' Mega Manila household television ratings, the pilot episode of Love Bug earned a 9.9% rating. The final episode scored a 2.7% rating in Mega Manila People/Individual television ratings.

== Accolades ==
Accolades received by Love Bug
Year	Award	Category	Recipient	Result	Ref.
2011	25th PMPC Star Awards for Television	Best Drama Mini-Series	"The Last Romance"	Nominated	
