= Jackie Rice =

Filipino actress (born 1990)

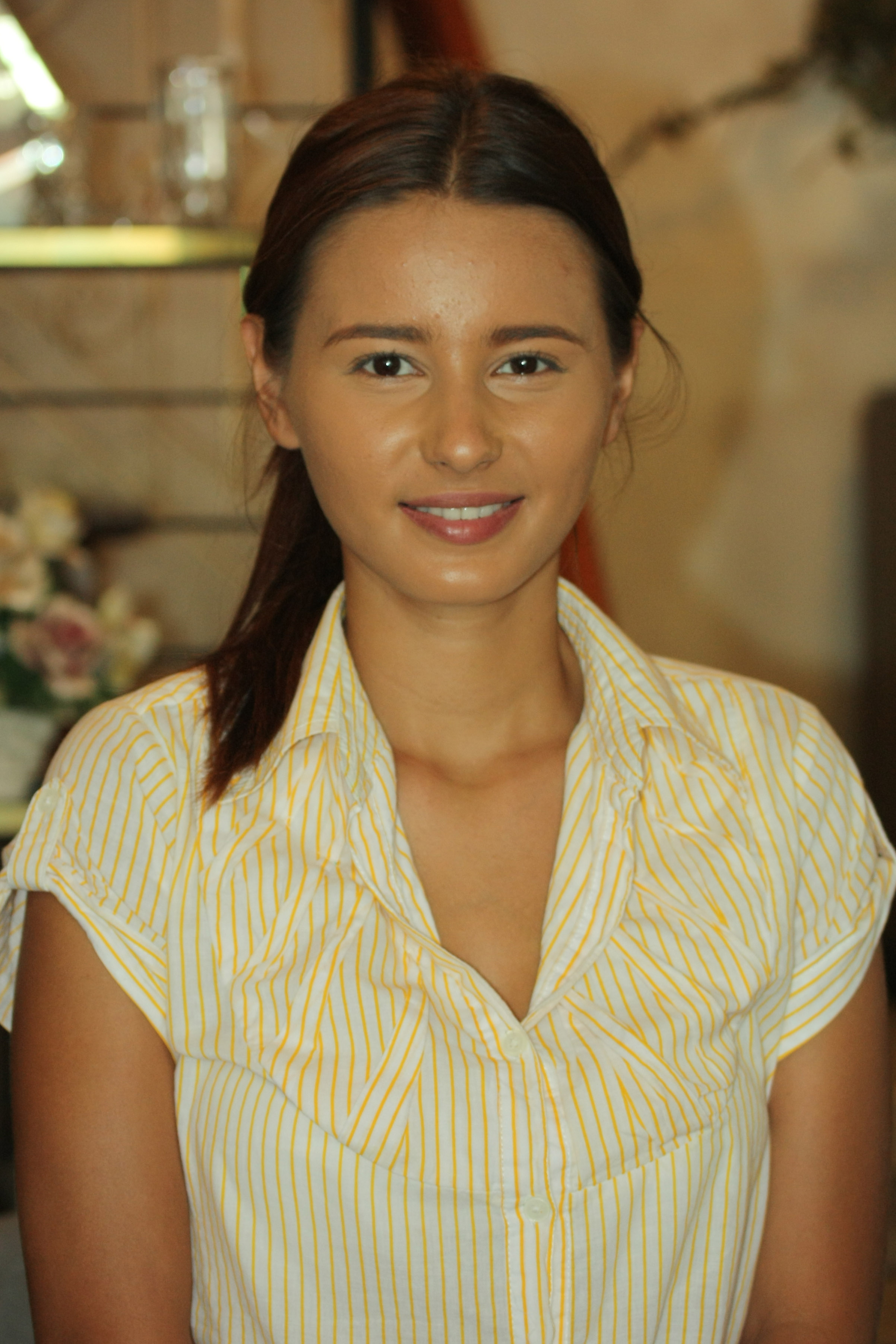
- Rice in 2011
- Born: Jacqueline Sobreo Rice; April 27, 1990 (age 36); Dinalupihan, Bataan, Philippines
- Occupations: Actress; model
- Years active: 2005–2022
- Agent: Sparkle GMA Artist Center (2005–2022)
- Partner: Andrew Lopez (2020)

Jacqueline Sobreo Rice (born April 27, 1990) is a Filipino former actress and model. Until 2022, she was a contract artist of GMA Artist Center. Rice appeared as the cover girl for Maxim magazine in July 2009 and FHM twice in January 2010 and July 2012.

== Life and career ==
Born to an American father and a Filipino mother, Rice grew up in Olongapo City, Zambales. She was a student at St. Anne Academy in Olongapo City when she entered showbusiness through GMA Network's reality search contest StarStruck, where she became the Ultimate Female Survivor in the show's third season.

After StarStruck, she appeared in Love to Love. She was then suspended from work by GMA for six weeks after she was seen drinking and smoking in public. After her suspension, she appeared in Fantastikids, Princess Charming and later starred in Fantastic Man. She then joined Dyesebel and Ang Babaeng Hinugot sa Aking Tadyang.

In 2009, Rice was cast in a supporting role in the remake of Kung Aagawin Mo ang Lahat sa Akin, playing Maxene Magalona's younger sister, and as a costar to Manny Pacquiao in the indie film Sa Ngalan ng Busabos. She also appeared as the cover girl for Maxim magazine in July 2009. To end the year, she played Helga, ang Demonyita, a villainess in Mars Ravelo's Darna starring Marian Rivera and also took a supporting role in the MMFF film Ang Darling Kong Aswang.

For January 2010, Rice was the cover girl for FHM, making her debut on the men's magazine. When FHM released their 25 Sexiest Women of the Decade, she was listed at no. 23. She was also cast in the fantaserye Panday Kids before landing lead roles for the shows Dear Friend Presents: Tisay and Ilumina, where she played a dark sorceress possessed by a demon.

In 2017, she joined the cast of My Love from the Star, the Philippine remake of the Korean drama of the same name. In 2018, Rice took on another villainous role when she played the insane Ava, lead antagonist of Hindi Ko Kayang Iwan Ka, drawing similarities to fellow StarStruck alumna Ryza Cenon's performance in Ika-6 na Utos. Later in 2019, she was cast as Tiffy, the comical supporting villain in TODA One I Love. In an interview with Rice, she admitted that the antagonist role was far from her previous characters, stating her character in Hindi Ko Kayang Iwan Ka was a "very dark and cold-blooded murderer," whereas TODA One I Love, she was "flirtatious and comical."

== Personal life ==
Rice was first in a relationship with Gian Carlos, who was also on Starstruck season 3. She was also in a relationship with actor Biboy Ramirez. Around 2010, she began a relationship with a non-showbiz boyfriend.

== Filmography ==
=== Television ===
Year	Title	Role	Ref.
2006	Encantadia: Pag-ibig Hanggang Wakas	Armea	
2006	Fantastikids	Princess	
2007	Princess Charming	Bernadette de Saavedra	
2007	Fantastikman	Helen	
2008	Mars Ravelo's Dyesebel	Arana	
2009	Ang Babaeng Hinugot sa Aking Tadyang	Cassandra Alcaraz	
2009	Sine Novela: Kung Aagawin Mo Ang Lahat Sa Akin	Mercedita Andrada	
2009–2010	Mars Ravelo's Darna	Helga/Demonyita	
2009	Ikaw Sana	Nina (cameo)	
2010	Carlo J. Caparas' Panday Kids	Jana/Sarah	
2010	Ilumina	Krisanta Sebastian	
2011	Sisid	Eden Cordelia/Pearl Dela Vida	
2012	Kasalanan Bang Ibigin Ka?	Erica Santiago-Montelibano	
2013	Bukod Kang Pinagpala	Janet Perez-Cheng	
2014	Innamorata	Georgina "Gina" Cunanan Manriquez	
2015	Second Chances	Denise Paredes-Castello	
2015	The Rich Man's Daughter	Young Ama	
2015–2016	Buena Familia	Iris Florencio	
2016	Magpakailanman:Tiyahin Ko, Karibal Ko	Milette	
2016	Dear Uge	Gina	
2016	Karelasyon	Various roles	
2016	Naku, Boss Ko!	Margeaux	
2016	Wagas	Madel	
2017	My Love from the Star	Lucy Yuzon	
2018	Hindi Ko Kayang Iwan Ka	Ava Imperial Policarpio	
2019	TODA One I Love	Tiffany "Tiffy" Obrero	
2019	Dahil sa Pag-ibig	Mercedes "Cedes" Reyes/Mylene Buenaventura	
2019	Beautiful Justice	Apple	

=== Drama anthology ===
Year	Title	Role	Ref.
2006	Magpakailanman: The Jackie Rice Life Story	Herself	
2006	Love to Love: Season 10	Claire	
2007	Maynila	Joan	
2008	Midnight DJ: Bloody Christmas Tree	Mylene (Cameo Role)	
2010	Dear Friend Presents: Tisay	Ella	
2011	Spooky Nights: Singil	Young Linda	
2011	Spooky Nights: Kadugo	Jess	
2011	Spooky Nights: Panata	Cristy	
2012	Spooky Valentine Presents: Manibela	Joan	
2015	Wagas: Colors of Love	Tessa Prieto-Valdes	
2015	Maynila: Substitute for Love	Nina	
2022	Wish Ko Lang: Asido	Josie	
2022	Tadhana: Tayong Dalawa	Sophia's mother	

=== Other shows ===
Year	Title	Role	Ref.
2005	StarStruck: Season 3	Herself/Contestant	
2006	SOP Gigsters	Herself/Performer	
2008–2019	Bubble Gang	Herself/Various Roles/Main Cast	
2015	Sabado Badoo	Herself/Guest	

=== Film ===
Year	Title	Role	Ref.
2006	Till I Met You	Hazel	
2009	Tatlong Baraha		
2009	Sa Ngalan Ng Busabos/Pangarap Kong Jackpot		
2009	Hellphone		
2009	Ang Darling Kong Aswang	Alpha	
2012	Si Agimat, si Enteng Kabisote at si Ako	Munyita	
2014	Kamkam	Shane	

Awards and achievements
Preceded by Ryza Cenon	StarStruck; 2005 (season 3)	Succeeded by Jewel Mische
