= Love to Love (TV program) =

Philippine television drama series

- Title card
- Genre: Romantic drama
- Opening theme: "Love to Love" by Jay R and Kyla
- Country of origin: Philippines
- Original language: Tagalog
- No. of episodes: 171

Production
- Executive producer: Ramel L. David
- Camera setup: Multiple-camera setup
- Running time: 33–54 minutes
- Production company: GMA Entertainment TV

Original release
- Network: GMA Network
- Release: July 13, 2003 – October 22, 2006

Love to Love is a Philippine television drama romance anthology series broadcast by GMA Network. It premiered on July 13, 2003. The series concluded on October 22, 2006, with a total of 171 episodes.

The show is streaming online on YouTube.

== Cast and characters ==
Rich in Love

- Oyo Boy Sotto
- Maxene Magalona
- Bryan Revilla
- Valerie Concepcion

Maid for Each Other

- Richard Gutierrez
- Chynna Ortaleza
- Nancy Castiglione
- Cogie Domingo

Yaya Lovely

- Tin Arnaldo
- Frank Garcia
- Sunshine Dizon
- Geoff Eigenmann
- JM de Guzman

My 1, 2 Love

- Richard Gutierrez
- Chynna Ortaleza
- Anne Curtis
- Kiel Rodriguez
- Bettina Carlos

Kissing Beauty

- Dennis Trillo
- Angel Locsin
- Cogie Domingo
- Dion Ignacio
- Nadine Samonte

Duet for Love

- Jay-R
- Toni Gonzaga
- Mark Herras
- Jennylyn Mercado
- Tyron Perez

Pretty Boy

- Paolo Contis
- Nancy Castiglione
- JC De Vera
- Cristine Reyes
- Gabby Eigenmann
- Julianne Lee
- Cindy Kurleto

Sweet Exchange

- Dingdong Dantes
- Karylle
- Bettina Rodriguez
- Railey Valeroso
- Iza Calzado
- Andrew Paredes

True Romance

- Antonio Aquitania
- Sunshine Dizon
- Brad Turvey
- Jacque Estevez

Love Blossoms

- Alfred Vargas
- Jolina Magdangal
- Biboy Ramirez
- Jake Cuenca
- Jan Marini
- Gerard Pizzaras

Wish Upon a Jar

- Yasmien Kurdi
- Rainier Castillo
- Jay Aquitania
- Bianca King
- Katrina Halili

Love for Rent

- Keempee de Leon
- Francine Prieto
- Nancy Castiglione
- Jeremy Marquez
- Kimberly Loveless

Love Ko Urok

- Mark Herras
- Jennylyn Mercado
- Mike Tan
- LJ Reyes
- Megan Young
- Chris Martin

Haunted Lovehouse

- Jay-R
- Chynna Ortaleza
- Paolo Contis
- Cindy Kurleto

Stuck in Love

- Ryza Cenon
- LJ Reyes
- Mike Tan
- CJ Muere

Love-ban o Bawi

- Ian Veneracion
- Jopay Paguia
- Ciara Sotto
- Paolo Ballesteros

Miss Match

- Jennylyn Mercado
- Jake Cuenca
- Katrina Halili
- Dion Ignacio

Like Mother, Like Daughters

- Isabel Oli
- Julia Clarete
- Paolo Contis
- Alfred Vargas

My Darling Mermaid

- Pauleen Luna
- Mark Herras
- Bianca King

Young at Heart

- Jackie Rice
- Iwa Moto
- Marky Cielo
- Gian Carlos

Fat is Fabulous

- Isabel Oli
- Paolo Contis
- Marco Alcaraz

Best Friends

- Ciara Sotto
- Paolo Ballesteros

Jass Got Lucky

- Lovi Poe
- Iwa Moto
- Bianca King
- Cogie Domingo
- Marky Cielo
- Ryza Cenon
- Nikki Bacolod

== Accolades ==
Accolades received by Love to Love
Year	Award	Category	Recipient	Result	Ref.
2005	19th PMPC Star Awards for Television	Best Youth Oriented Program	Love to Love	Nominated	
2005	Golden Screen TV Awards	Outstanding Lead Actress in a Drama Series	Karylle	Nominated	
2005	Golden Screen TV Awards	Outstanding Youth-Oriented Drama Series	Love to Love	Nominated	
2006	20th PMPC Star Awards for Television	Best Youth Oriented Program	Love to Love	Won	
2007	21st PMPC Star Awards for Television	Best Weekly Drama Series	Love to Love	Nominated	
