= E.S.P. (TV series) =

2008 Philippine television drama series

- Title card
- Genre: Horror drama
- Developed by: Jun Lana
- Directed by: Argel Joseph
- Starring: Iza Calzado
- Ending theme: "Kisapmata" by Aegis
- Country of origin: Philippines
- Original language: Tagalog
- No. of episodes: 18

Production
- Executive producer: Wilma Galvante
- Production locations: Metro Manila, Philippines
- Camera setup: Multiple-camera setup
- Running time: 26–43 minutes
- Production company: GMA Entertainment TV

Original release
- Network: GMA Network
- Release: February 7 – May 8, 2008

E.S.P. is a 2008 Philippine television drama horror series broadcast by GMA Network. Directed by Argel Joseph, it stars Iza Calzado. It premiered on February 7, 2008. The series concluded on May 8, 2008, with a total of 18 episodes.

The series is streaming online on YouTube.

== Cast and characters ==
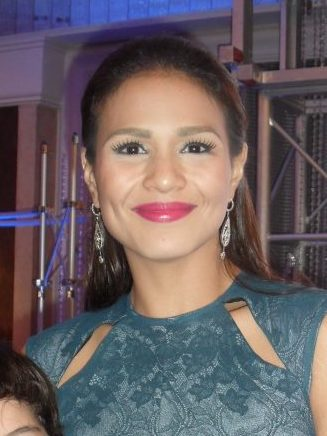
Iza Calzado portrays Cassandra.

Lead cast

- Iza Calzado as Cassandra

Supporting cast

- Ricky Davao as Larson
- Alfred Vargas as Dave
- Pen Medina as Bestre
- Francine Prieto as Ivy
- Patricia Ismael as Anne

== Accolades ==
Accolades received by E.S.P.
Year	Award	Category	Recipient	Result	Ref.
2008	22nd PMPC Star Awards for Television	Best Horror-Fantasy Program	E.S.P.	Nominated	
