= C. J. Muere =

Filipino actor

- Born: Caesar Joseph L. Muere; February 18, 1988 (age 38); San Pablo, Laguna, Philippines
- Occupations: Dentist; Former: actor, host
- Years active: 2004–2008
- Agent: GMA Artist Center (2004–2008)
- Spouse: Patricia Vargas (m. 2018)
- Children: 1

Caesar Joseph L. Muere (born February 18, 1988), popularly known simply as C. J. Muere, is a former Filipino actor. He is best known for being in the Final Four of StarStruck season two and portraying Ding in the 2005 television series of Darna. Before applying for GMA Network's StarStruck, he was a dropped from ABS-CBN's Star Circle Quest, which is also a reality television talent search show.

== StarStruck ==
He auditioned in StarStruck in 2004 and he made it until the Top 7. He may be eliminated but through the Wild Card that was included in the season's format, he was selected, replacing Benj Pacia. He proved that he really deserved to be the wild card pick. He made it through to the coveted Final 4 along with LJ Reyes, Ryza Cenon and Mike Tan and wherein he finished as the runner up to Mike Tan.

=== StarStruck standing ===
| Week # | Finalists | Status | Eliminated | Date |
| 1 | Final 14 | Safe | N/A | 2004-10-22 |
| 2 | Final 14 | Safe | Jellaine Santos | 2004-10-29 |
| 3 | Final 13 | Safe | Kevin Santos | 2004-11-05 |
| 4 | Final 12 | Pro Recognition Awardee | Ailyn Luna | 2004-11-12 |
| 5 | Final 11 | Safe | Ken Punzalan | 2004-11-19 |
| 6 | Final 10 | Bottom 3 | N/A | 2004-11-26 |
| 7 | Final 10 | Safe | N/A | 2004-12-03 |
| 8 | Final 10 | Safe | Ana David | 2004-12-06 |
| 8 | Final 9 | Safe | Chris Martin | 2004-12-10 |
| 9 | Final 8 | Safe | Krizzy Jareño | 2004-12-17 |
| 10 | Final 7 | Bottom 3 | Eliminated | 2004-12-24 |
| 11 | Final 6 | - | - | 2004-12-31 |
| 13 | Wild Card Week | Selected | Benj Pacia | 2005-01-14 |
| 14 | Final 6 | Safe | Kirby de Jesus; Megan Young | 2005-01-21 |
| Final Judgment | Final 4 | First Prince (Runner - Up) | N/A | 2005-02-20 |

- ^1 CJ got the highest point for that week.

== Filmography ==
=== Film ===
- Lovestruck (2005) as Cocoy

=== Television ===
- Mars Ravelo's Darna
- Love to Love
- Ay, Robot!
- Now and Forever: Mukha
- SOP Gigsters
- StarStruck Season Two

== Priority ==
Muere called a batch mate of his in StarStruck to tell that he formally said good bye to Ms. Ida Henares, to say good bye to show business. Muere wants to study full-time and he is taking Dentistry at Centro Escolar University. In March 2013, he graduated at Centro Escolar University with the degree of Doctor of Dental Medicine and passed the Dentistry Licensure exam at the same year. He is currently taking his M.S. Orthodontics at Centro Escolar University Graduate School.

Awards and achievements
| Preceded by Rainier Castillo | StarStruck; Runner-up; 2004 (season 2) | Succeeded by Gian Carlos |
