= Ryza Cenon =

Filipino actress, dancer, model, and painter (born 1987)

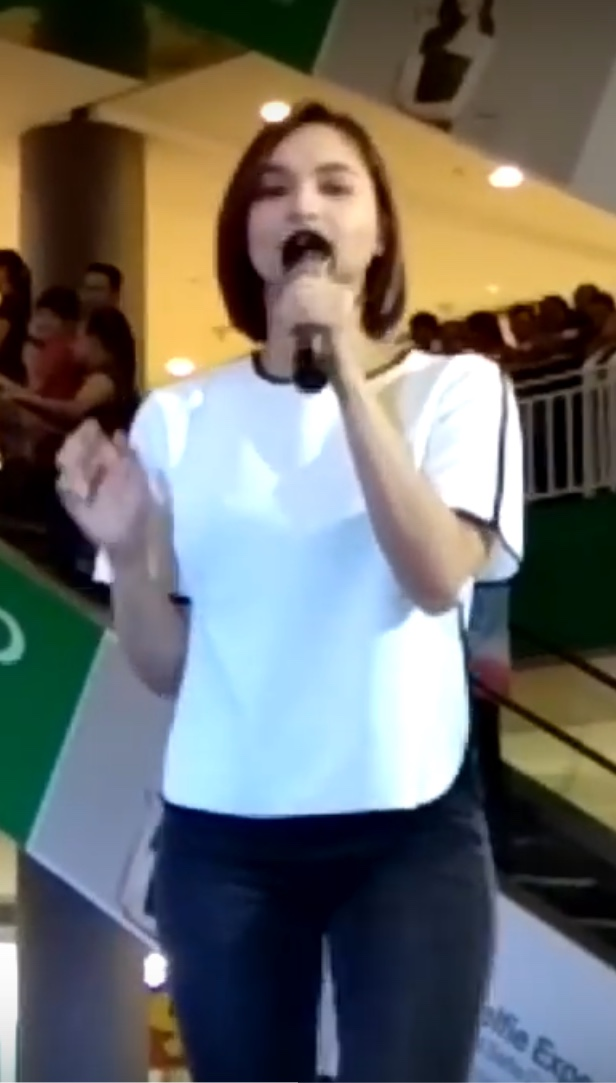
- Ryza Cenon at Gaisano Mall of Davao in 2017
- Born: Rhiza Ann Cenon Simbulan; December 21, 1987 (age 38); Gapan, Nueva Ecija, Philippines
- Education: Augustinian School of Cabuyao; AMA Computer Learning Center; Center for Culinary Arts, Manila
- Occupations: Actress; Dancer; Model; Painter
- Years active: 2004–present
- Agents: GMA Artist Center (2004–2018, 2026–present); Viva Artists Agency (2017–present)
- Known for: Georgia, Aubrey, Jessie
- Height: 5 ft 2 in (157 cm)
- Partner: Miguel Antonio Cruz (2020–present)
- Children: 1

Rhiza Ann "Ryza" Cenon Simbulan (born December 21, 1987) is a Filipino actress, dancer, model and painter. In 2004, she became the Ultimate Female Survivor of the second season of StarStruck of GMA Network. She appeared in several shows including Darna, Ay, Robot!, Majika, Fantastikids, Fantastic Man, Joaquin Bordado, Buena Familia, and Alyas Robin Hood.

In the year 2016, Cenon starred as Jewel in the romantic gore indie film Ang Manananggal sa Unit 23B. In December 2016, she appeared as Georgia Acuzar-Ferrer in the TV show Ika-6 na Utos and became more popular because of that.

== Early life and education ==
Ryza Cenon was born Rhiza Ann Cenon Simbulan on December 21, 1987, in then municipality of Gapan, province of Nueva Ecija, Philippines. She was the youngest child of the two children. Her mother, Rosanna C. Simbulan, died of stomach cancer in 1991 when Cenon was only three years old. Her father works as an OFW in Abu Dhabi, UAE.

Cenon lived with her maternal grandmother for most of her childhood. Right after Rosanna's death, Rhiza and her grandmother stayed in Gapan. They transferred to the province of Laguna a few years later. After her father's marriage to his second wife, Cenon transferred to Malabon City. She later transferred to Santa Rosa, Nueva Ecija after her father and step mother's separation. Few years later she left the province and transferred to her grandmother's residence in Santa Rosa, Laguna.

Cenon finished her elementary and high school at the Augustinian School of Cabuyao in Laguna. She later enrolled at the AMA Computer Learning Center and graduated as a computer programmer.

== Career ==
=== Acting career ===
==== 2004: Winning Star-Struck ====
In 2004, Cenon joined GMA Network's original reality talent search. She became the Ultimate Female Survivor of StarStruck season 2 (with Mike Tan as the Ultimate Male Survivor). They both received 1,000,000 pesos plus exclusive contracts from the GMA Network. After winning StarStruck, Cenon appeared as a guest performer on the musical variety show SOP Gigsters (2004 - 2006).

==== 2005–2010: Career beginnings ====
Cenon began her career with GMA Network playing the role of Mae in Now and Forever (2005). In the same year, she joined the cast of Darna. Cenon played the villainous Louella, a member of the Divas Impaktitas who was determined to exact vengeance upon Darna (played by Angel Locsin) after she what she did to her sister. Darna became the first primetime television series in the Philippines to earn a 47.1% rating in its pilot episode, the highest rating for a pilot episode in the Philippine television history.

In 2006, Cenon appeared in Majika with Angel Locsin, Dennis Trillo, and Katrina Halili. It is directed by Eric Quizon (who also directed Darna) and Mac Alejandre. Cenon played the anti-heroine role of Pria / Sara, Sabina's (played by Angel Locsin) younger sister. After Majika, she starred in the movie Lovestruck (2006) where she won the New Movie Actress of the Year at the 2006 Star Awards for Movies. In the same year she also played Anabelle on the fantasy-adventure series, Fantastikids, where she starred alongside Marky Cielo, Jackie Rice and Glaiza de Castro, as well as former child star Paolo Contis and former beauty queen Melanie Marquez.

In 2008, Cenon starred in the drama action series Joaquin Bordado alongside Robin Padilla, Iza Calzado, and Mark Herras. The series is based from a comic book serial by Carlo J. Caparas with the same title. Cenon played the role of Cecile, the granddaughter of General Russo (played by Eddie Garcia) and sister of Kevin (played by Antonio Aquitania) but spitefully angry at the person who caused her blindness. Actresses Jennylyn Mercado and Cristine Reyes were initially tapped to play important roles in the series. Due to Mercado's pregnancy, she had to be replaced by Cenon, while Reyes had some problems with the production and was quickly replaced by Iwa Moto.

Cenon played a number of supporting roles from 2007 to 2010, Cenon played the superheroine Wena / Fantastic Girl in Fantastic Man (2007) alongside Mark Herras and Jackie Rice, the estranged & cold-blooded Abril Del Castillo in Rosalinda (2009), the jealous and selfish Apple Madrigal in Gumapang Ka sa Lusak (2010), the gold digger Candy / Joy Flores in Langit sa Piling Mo (2010), the happy and lighthearted Darlene Roces in Koreana (2010); and the villain Regine in Bantatay (2010).

==== 2011–2016: Notable roles ====
In 2011, Cenon appeared as Mia Valencia in I Heart You, Pare! and her second project on GMA for 2011 was in another villain role in Machete which debuted on GMA Network on January 24, 2011, and ended on March 19 of that year. The show, which also starred Aljur Abrenica, Bela Padilla, Kris Bernal and the director actress Gina Alajar and is partly based on the 1990s Machete. Cenon played the ambitious Marla Lucero / Fake Aginaya / New Bugana and soon-to-be a villainess to dancer-actress Bela Padilla's heroine Aginaya/Rosella.

The following year, she appeared in the drama series Legacy. Cenon played the supporting role of Juliet, the super ambitious best friend of Diana Calcetas (played by Heart Evangelista). Right after Legacy, she played another villain role on Luna Blanca: Ang Ikalawang Yugto (Book 2). Cenon played Ashley Alvarez, one of the main villainess of the series second chapter and the younger sister of Divine Alvarez-Buenaluz (played by Chynna Ortaleza and later Carmi Martin).

Cenon appeared on three television series in 2013. The first drama series is Sana ay Ikaw na Nga where she played the female villain Olga Villavicer / Sandra Sebastian, the psychopathic and cold-hearted murderess. The second series, Indio, was an epic fantasy series directed by Dondon Santos. She also played the role of Isabel Alonso, the supportive younger sister of the noble man Mariano Alfonso (played by Carlos Morales) but very arrogant and highly malevolent. The third series was Adarna where she played the role of Mikay.

In 2015, Cenon appeared as a supporting actress in three drama series on GMA Network: Mariel in Second Chances (2015), the supportive cunning sister Margarita "Rita" Barcial in Kailan Ba Tama ang Mali? (2015); and the supportive partner in crime Vaness Castro in Buena Familia (2015).

Cenon's acting career blossomed in the year 2016. She with actor Martin del Rosario starred in Ang Manananggal sa Unit 23B. This romantic gore independent film was directed by Prime Cruz and produced under The IdeaFirst Company. Cenon plays Jewel, the lonely manananggal who fell in love with the heartbroken man named Nico (played by Martin del Rosario). Sex and masturbation scenes were shot during the filming (one with actor Cholo Barretto). Her portrayal of Jewel is considered as her first mature role.

In December 2016, Cenon together with fellow actors Sunshine Dizon, Gabby Concepcion, and Mike Tan starred in the afternoon primetime series Ika-6 na Utos. Ryza plays the main villain role of Georgia Ferrer / Athena Francisco, the glamorous and evil mistress of Airline Captain Jerome "Rome" Fuentabella (played by Gabby Concepcion). Her character is described as a ruthless, psychopathic, cunning and seductive femme fatale. Cenon was nominated for Best Supporting Actress in the 2017 7th EdukCircle Awards for her performance in Ika 6 na Utos. On December 8, 2017, Cenon won her first Best Supporting Actress award in the 7th OFW Gawad Parangal. She received her TV Supporting Actress of the Year in the 49th Box-Office Entertainment Awards on May 1, 2018.

Cenon also appeared as the hotel attendant Georgia in the fantasy-comedy film Enteng Kabisote 10 and the Abangers (2016).

==== 2017: Contract with Viva Artist Agency ====
On June 15, 2017, after thirteen years of being a talent of GMA Artist Center under GMA Network, Cenon signed an exclusive contract with Viva Artist Agency. In 2017, Cenon starred with JC Santos in Mr. and Mrs. Cruz. The movie was released on January 24, 2018. Cenon received the Yakushi Pearl Award at Osaka Asian Film Festival 2018 for her performance in Mr. and Mrs. Cruz.

==== 2018: Transfer to ABS-CBN ====
On April 12, 2018, Cenon signed an exclusive contract with ABS-CBN. Her first project was FPJ's Ang Probinsyano. She played the role of Aubrey Hidalgo, the daughter of President Oscar Hidalgo (played by Rowell Santiago) and First Lady Marissa Hidalgo (played by Dawn Zulueta). She also appeared as one of the lead cast in The General's Daughter alongside Angel Locsin, Eula Valdez, Maricel Soriano, Janice de Belen, Albert Martinez and Tirso Cruz III.

=== Modeling career ===
Cenon appeared on several covers of FHM Philippines Magazine and was included on the list of the magazine's 100 Sexiest Women in the World. Cenon was ranked number 45 in 2005, number 68 in 2006, number 50 in 2007, number 58 in 2008, number 91 in 2009, number 95 in 2010, number 95 in 2011, number 15 in 2013, number 26 in 2014, number 22 in 2015, number 75 in 2016, and number 45 in 2017. She succeeded Sunshine Cruz as the FHM Philippines Cover Girl in May 2013.

=== SH3 trio ===
Cenon, together with LJ Reyes and Chynna Ortaleza, formed a sing-and-dance group called SH3 in January 2010. The trio performed on the Sunday variety show SOP Rules. The group disbanded in the same year.

== Personal life ==
Cenon had an estranged relationship with her father and brother.

In an interview in 2017, she said that she had suffered depression. She took up painting as an instrument to beat her depression. Independencia: Ang Panimula, Cenon's first painting exhibit, was held in a restaurant in San Juan City on June 19, 2016. Most of her paintings were abstract.

Aside from painting, Cenon is an enthusiast of archery. She is also into cooking. In 2015, she enrolled at the Center for Culinary Arts, Manila after the successful opening of her food business, PaBurrito.

She had a relationship with actor and model Cholo Barretto, cousin of fellow actor Julia Barretto. The relationship was confirmed by Cenon on November 23, 2016. The two broke up in January 2019, and in November of the same year, Cenon announced her "engagement" to herself.

In July 2020, Cenon announced on her Instagram that she was five months pregnant with her boyfriend and cinematographer Miguel Antonio Cruz. On October 31, 2020, Cenon and Cruz welcomed their first child, a son named Night.

== Filmography ==
=== Television ===
Year	Title	Role	Notes	Ref.
2004	StarStruck	Herself / Ultimate Female Survivor		
2005	Now and Forever	Mae	Episode: "Mukha"	
2005	SOP Gigsters	Herself / Performer		
2005	Baywalk	Various		
2005	Darna	Louella / Divas Impaktitas		
2005	Love to Love (Season 8)	Barbie	Episode: "Stuck In Love"	
2005–2010	SOP Rules	Herself / Co-Host		
2005–2007	Ay, Robot!	Aiza		
2006	Majika	Sarah / Pria		
2006	Fantastikids	Annabelle		
2006	Love to Love (Season 12)	Chloe	Episode: "Jass Got Lucky"	
2007	Fantastic Man	Wennah / Fantastic Girl		
2008	Joaquin Bordado	Cecille		
2008	Dear Friend	Kate		
2009	Gagambino	Ada		
2009	Dear Friend	Mia	Episode: "Bakasyonistas"	
2009	Rosalinda	Abril Del Castillo		
2009	SRO Cinemaserye	Veronique	Episode: "Exchange Gift"	
2010	Sine Novela: Gumapang Ka sa Lusak	Apple Madrigal		
2010	Dear Friend	Weng	Episode: "Tisay"	
2010	Langit sa Piling Mo	Candy / Joy Flores		
2010	Bantatay	Regine		
2010	Untold Stories mula sa Face to Face	Dawn	Episode: "Dalawang Babae, Pusong Lalake"	
2010–2011	Koreana	Darlene Roces		
2010–2013	Party Pilipinas	Co-Host / Performer		
2011	I ♥ You, Pare!	Mia Valencia		
2011	Machete	Marla Lucero / Fake Aginaya / New Bugana		
2011	Spooky Nights	Alice	Episode: "Panata"	
2011	Time of My Life	Rochelle		
2012	Legacy	Juliet		
2012	Spooky Nights	White Lady	Episode: "Sapi"	
2012	My Beloved	Pepay (young adult)		
2012	Luna Blanca: Ang Ikalawang Yugto (Book 2)	Ashley Alvarez		
2012	Aso ni San Roque	Grace Santos		
2012	Magpakailanman	Jenny	Episode: "The Power of Love"	
2012–2013	Sana ay Ikaw na Nga	Olga Villavicer / Sandra Sebastian		
2013	Indio	Isabelle Alfonso		
2013	Tanikala V	May Montealegre	Episode: "Liwanag sa Dapithapon"	
2013	Magpakailanman	Kat	Episode: "Transman"	
2013	Magpakailanman	Alyssa Quijano	Episode: "Coming Out: The Charice Pempengco Story"	
2013	Prinsesa ng Buhay Ko	Selena Monteverde		
2013	Wagas: Ed-Julie Love Story	Julie		
2013–2015	Sunday All Stars	Herself / Co-Host		
2013–2014	Adarna	Mikay		
2014	Innamorata	Donya Prescillia Manansala		
2014	Magpakailanman	Cynthia	Episode: "Tatay na si Totoy, Nanay na si Nene"	
2014	Wagas	Danica Sotto	Episode: "Marc & Danica Love Story"	
2014	Magpakailanman	Malou	Episode: "Ang Ina na Hindi Malilimutan"	
2015	Second Chances	Marielle		
2015	Kailan Ba Tama ang Mali?	Margaritha Barcial		
2015	Maynila	Miranda	Episode: "Sisters for Life"	
2015	Magpakailanman		Episode: "Tapat na Asawa, Baliw na Ina"	
2015	Karelasyon#PanchoLJRyza	Linda		
2015	Imbestigador	Sara	Episode: "Magkapatid"	
2015–2016	Buena Familia	Vaness Castro		
2016	Karelasyon: Third Eye	Marie		
2016	Maynila		Episode: "Fan Mode"	
2016	A1 Ko Sa 'Yo	Candy		
2016	Sinungaling Mong Puso	Leda Robles Aguirre		
2016	Dear Uge	Dahlia	Episode: "Maid in China"	
2016	Alyas Robin Hood	Nancy Benitez		
2016–2017	Sunday PinaSaya	Performer		
2016–2018	Ika-6 na Utos	Georgia Acuzar Ferrer		
2017	Magpakailanman	Jorina	Episode: "The Healing Touch of Love"	
2018	Maalaala Mo Kaya	Rio	Episode: "Life on Wheels"	
2018	ASAP Natin 'To	Co-host / Performer		
2018	Ipaglaban Mo	Hellena	Episode: "Dangal"	
2018–2019	FPJ's Ang Probinsyano	Aubrey Hidalgo		
2018–2019	Home Sweetie Home	Luisa Caruhatan		
2019	The General's Daughter	Jessica De Leon		
2019	Ipaglaban Mo	Annie	Episode: "Labandera"	
2020	A Soldier's Heart	Young Minda Marasigan		
2020	Bella Bandida	Annabelle Suarez		
2022	Maalaala Mo Kaya	Lorraine	Episode: "Medalyon"	
2022	Mga Kwentong Epik	Ria / Maria Makiling		
2023	FPJ's Batang Quiapo	Young Olga		
2023	Kurdapya	Margie		
2023	The Iron Heart	Circe Miranda		
2024–2025	Lumuhod Ka sa Lupa	Christina Maceda Balmores		
2026	Hari ng Tondo			

=== Film ===
Year	Title	Role	Notes	Ref.
2005	Lovestruck	Myka		
2006	Puso 3	-		
2012	Migrante	Mila		
2016	Diyos-diyosan		Segment: "Mukbang"	
2016	Enteng Kabisote 10 and the Abangers	Ruth		
2016	Ang Manananggal sa Unit 23B	Jewel		
2017	Mr. & Mrs. Cruz	Gela		
2018	Jack Em Popoy: The Puliscredibles	Andrea Montenegro	An entry to the 2018 Metro Manila Film Festival	
2022	Rooftop	Ellie		
2023	Kunwari Mahal Kita	Hydes		
2023	Sa Muli	Aurora / Belen / Elly		
2023	Instant Daddy	Kate		
2024	Lilim	Helena		
2025	Posthouse	Ange		

== Awards and recognitions ==
Year	Award-giving body	Category	Nominated work	Result	Ref.
2006	Star Awards For Movies	New Movie Actress for the Year	Lovestruck	Won	
2016	QCinema Film Festival 2016	Best Actress	Ang Manananggal sa Unit 23B	Nominated	
2017	7th EdukCircle Awards	Best Supporting Actress	Ika-6 na Utos	Nominated	
2017	7th OFW Gawad Parangal	Best Supporting Actress	Ika-6 na Utos	Won	
2018	Osaka Asian Film Festival	Best Performer (Yakushi Pearl Award)	Mr. and Mrs. Cruz	Won	
2018	49th Box-Office Entertainment Awards	TV Supporting Actress of the Year	Ika-6 na Utos	Won	
2020	9th OFW Gawad Parangal	Best Supporting Actress	The General's Daughter	Won	

== FHM Philippines rankings ==
Year	Magazine Company / Issue Title	Award Title	Result	Reference
2005	FHM Philippines	FHM Philippines’ 100 Sexiest Women	Rank No. 45	
2006	FHM Philippines	FHM Philippines’ 100 Sexiest Women	Rank No. 68	
2007	FHM Philippines	FHM Philippines’ 100 Sexiest Women	Rank No. 50	
2008	FHM Philippines	FHM Philippines’ 100 Sexiest Women	Rank No. 58	
2009	FHM Philippines	FHM Philippines’ 100 Sexiest Women	Rank No. 91	
2010	FHM Philippines	FHM Philippines’ 100 Sexiest Women	Rank No. 95	
2011	FHM Philippines	FHM Philippines’ 100 Sexiest Women	Rank No. 95	
2013	FHM Philippines	FHM Philippines’ 100 Sexiest Women	Rank No. 15	
2014	FHM Philippines	FHM Philippines’ 100 Sexiest Women	Rank No. 26	
2015	FHM Philippines	FHM Philippines’ 100 Sexiest Women	Rank No. 22	
2016	FHM Philippines	FHM Philippines’ 100 Sexiest Women	Rank No. 75	
2017	FHM Philippines	FHM Philippines’ 100 Sexiest Women	Rank No. 45	

Preceded by Sunshine Cruz	FHM Cover Girl (May 2013)	Succeeded by Jennylyn Mercado

Awards and achievements
Preceded by Jennylyn Mercado	StarStruck; 2004 (season 2)	Succeeded by Jackie Rice
