= Fantastic Man =

2007 Philippine television drama series

- Title card
- Genre: Action drama; Fantasy
- Based on: Fantastic Man (2003)
- Directed by: Zoren Legaspi
- Starring: Mark Herras
- Country of origin: Philippines
- Original language: Tagalog
- No. of episodes: 31

Production
- Executive producer: Wilma Galvante
- Camera setup: Multiple-camera setup
- Running time: 60 minutes
- Production company: GMA Entertainment TV

Original release
- Network: GMA Network
- Release: April 14 – November 10, 2007

Fantastic Man is a 2007 Philippine television drama action fantasy series broadcast by GMA Network. The series is based on a 2003 Philippine film of the same title. Directed by Zoren Legaspi, it stars Mark Herras in the title role. It premiered on April 14, 2007. The series concluded on November 10, 2007, with a total of 31 episodes.

== Cast and characters ==
Cast

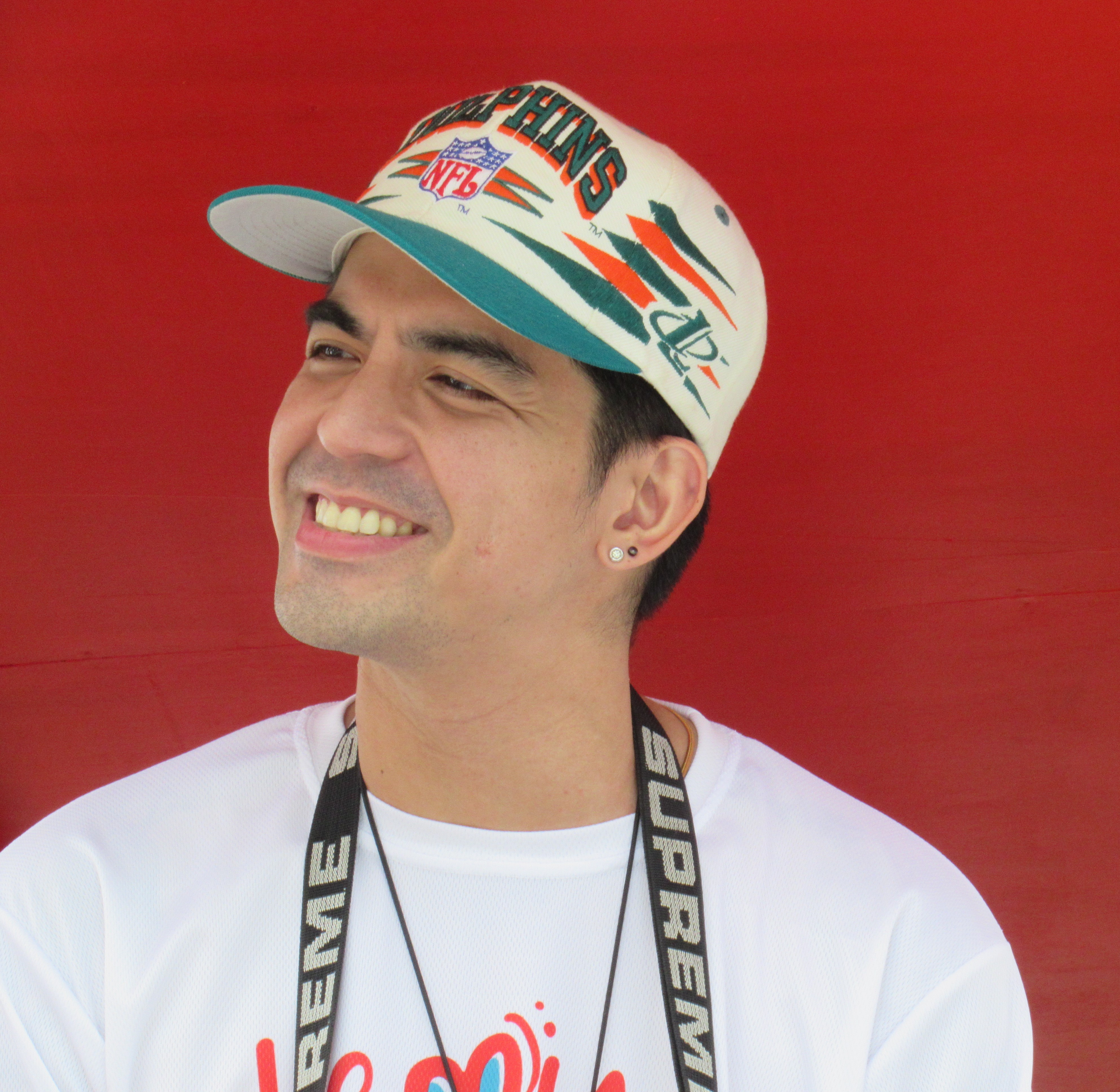
Mark Herras

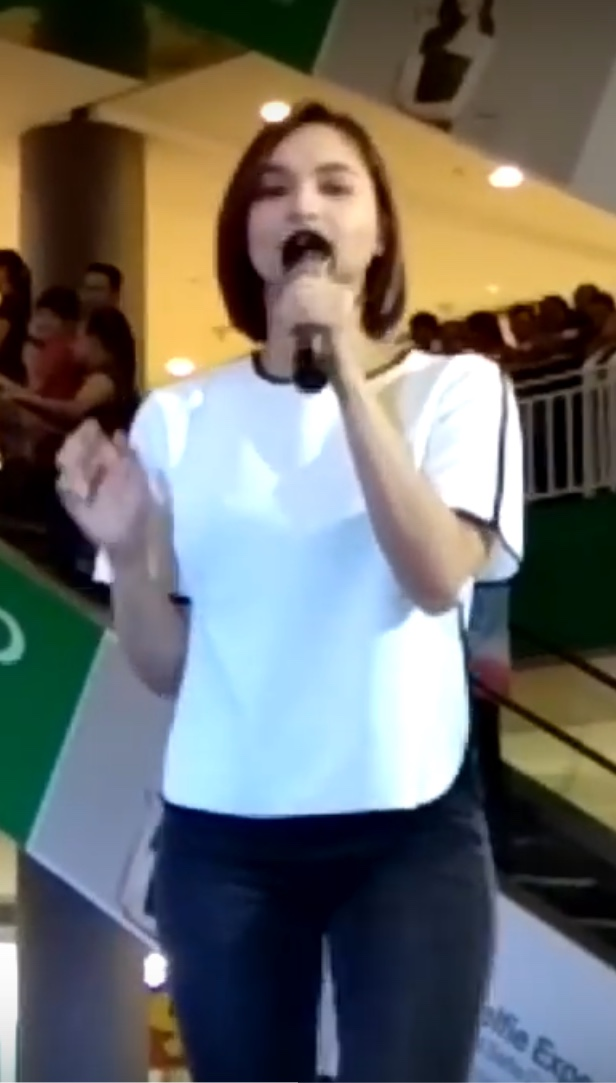
Ryza Cenon

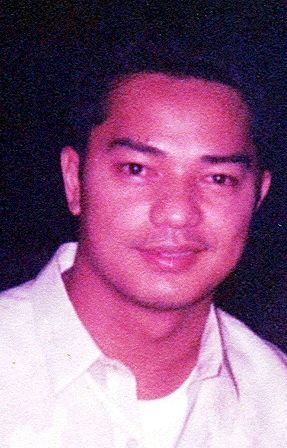
Ariel Rivera

Lead cast

- Mark Herras as Fredo / Fantastic Man

Supporting cast

- Ryza Cenon as Wena / Fantastic Girl
- Joey Marquez as Manalo
- Gloria Sevilla as Cedes
- Miguel Tanfelix as Tikboy
- Ariel Rivera as Danny / Tadtad
- Patricia Ysmael
- Jackie Rice as Helen
- Beth Tamayo as Linda
- Paolo Contis as Tisay
- Benjie Paras as Gobo
- Rez Cortez as Elvis
- Pen Medina as Singkit
- Keempee de Leon as Budol
- Nicole Anderson as K
- Ana Lea Javier as Faith
- Patrick Garcia as Lloyd
- Valerie Concepcion as Belle
- Chuck Allie
- Alvin Aragon
- Jewel Mische as Vicky
- Dion Ignacio as Dexter / Fire Man
- Cristine Reyes as Kate / Screamer / Sylvia (special episode)
- Ryan Yllana as Jopet / Lava Man
- Arci Muñoz as Candy / Ice Candy
- Rainier Castillo as Arman
- Kevin Santos
- Kirby de Jesus
- Mike Tan as Bornok
- Mart Escudero
- Sherilyn Reyes as Elektrika
- Maureen Larrazabal as Juliet
- Jennylyn Mercado as Super S
- Nadine Samonte as Super T
- Marco Alcaraz as Ivan
- LJ Reyes as Binhi
- Luis Alandy as Draxor
- Jose Manalo and Wally Bayola as Super Dings
- Paulo Avelino
- Vivo Ouano
- Bugz Daigo
- Boy 2 Quizon as Cardo
- Joyce Jimenez

== Production ==
Principal photography concluded on October 19, 2007.

== Accolades ==
Accolades received by Fantastic Man
Year	Award	Category	Recipient	Result	Ref.
2007	21st PMPC Star Awards for Television	Best Horror-Fantasy Program	Fantastic Man	Nominated	
