= LJ Reyes =

Filipina actress (born 1987)

- Born: Lourna Jane Pujeda Reyes; December 25, 1987 (age 38); Quezon City, Philippines
- Occupations: Actress, Dancer, Model
- Years active: 2004–2018, 2026–present
- Agent(s): Sparkle GMA Artist Center (2004–2018); Star Magic (2026–present)
- Known for: Marge in D' Originals; Senyora Angeli in Pinulot Ka Lang sa Lupa; Flora in Yagit; Kate in Prinsesa ng Buhay Ko; Lourdes in Aso ni San Roque; Zaira in Time of My Life; Frances in The Good Daughter
- Spouse: Philip Evangelista (m. 2023)
- Children: 2

Lourna Jane Pujeda Reyes-Evangelista (born December 25, 1987), known professionally as LJ Reyes, is a Filipino actress. She is best known as one of the Final Four in the second season of the widely acclaimed GMA reality TV show, StarStruck. She won Best Actress at the 39th Gawad Urian Awards. She was an exclusive artist of GMA Network until she left when her contract expired in 2018.

== Life and career ==
LJ Reyes was born in Fairview, Quezon City. She spent her high school days at St. Stephen's High School.

In 2004, Reyes auditioned for the second season of StarStruck where she ended up as First Princess. Her first show was Now and Forever: Mukha, where she worked with StarStruck runners-up and winners Ryza Cenon, CJ Muere and Mike Tan. Aside from acting, she is also a good dancer, performing with Cenon, Mark Herras, Marky Cielo among others. She is involved mostly in supporting roles on GMA Network shows.

Reyes had her biggest break as a lead villainess in Zaido: Pulis Pangkalawakan then, playing one of the leading ladies to JC de Vera in Babangon Ako't Dudurugin Kita. Reyes had another break by joining the cast of Una Kang Naging Akin, another Filipino soap opera. Reyes was given many praises by critics for her outstanding role in Una Kang Naging Akin which made her rise to fame. She posed for the local FHM magazine in December 2009 where she was also the cover girl.

In 2010, she formed a trio called SH3, with Ryza Cenon and Chynna Ortaleza, and they performed on the Sunday variety show SOP Rules until the group disbanded because of plagiarism issues. In the same year, she won as Best Supporting Actress in Cinemalaya for her role in the indie movie The Leaving.

Reyes was baptized as a Born again Christian in August 2015.

== Personal life ==
She dated fellow GMA artist Paulo Avelino, who was a contestant in the fourth season of StarStruck. On July 24, 2010, she gave birth to their son. She dated Paolo Contis from 2016 to 2021. On January 4, 2019, she gave birth to their daughter, Summer Ayana. On September 1, 2021, she confirmed that she and Contis were no longer together. On May 30, 2023, Reyes announced her engagement to her boyfriend, Philip Evangelista. The couple married on October 8, 2023, in Eatons Neck, New York.

== Filmography ==
=== Film ===
Year	Title	Role
2005	Lovestruck	Sophia
2006	Puso 3	Erika
2006	Manay Po!	Gina
2007	Pi7ong Tagpo	Tanya
2010	The Leaving	Grace
2012	Intoy Syokoy ng Kalye Marino	Doray
2012	Tiktik: The Aswang Chronicles	Hilda
2013	She's the One	Alice
2015	Anino sa Likod ng Buwan	Emma
2015	Haunted Mansion	Veronica Lobregat

=== Television ===
Year	Title	Role
2005	Now and Forever: Mukha	Melody
2006	I Luv NY	Ponyang
2006–2007	Makita Ka Lang Muli	Vianne
2007	Magic Kamison	Misty
2007	Lupin	Elaine
2007	Fantastic Man	Binhi (Season 2)
2007–2008	Zaido: Pulis Pangkalawakan	Amazonang Lila / Debbie
2008	Babangon Ako't Dudurugin Kita	Joanna Marie "Joey" Salcedo
2008	Sine Novela: Una Kang Naging Akin	Liway Mallari
2009	Totoy Bato	Gilette Molina
2009	Zorro	Sandy
2009	All My Life	Maricar
2010	Sine Novela: Ina, Kasusuklaman Ba Kita?	Katrina Evangelista
2011	Time of My Life	Zaira Marquez
2012	The Good Daughter	Francesca "Frances" Alejandro Reyes
2012–2013	Aso ni San Roque	Lourdes / Lualhati Salvador
2013	Wagas (Coach Rio Dela Cruz and Nicole Wuthrich Story)	Nicole Wuthrich
2013	Bayan Ko	Atty. Karen Canlas
2013–2014	Prinsesa ng Buhay Ko	Kate Napoleon
2014–2015	Yagit	Florentina "Flora" Fabro Trinidad-Macabuhay
2015	Magpakailanman: Under1Roof	Heidi
2015	Karelasyon#PanchoLJRyza	Melissa
2015–2016	MariMar	Inocencia Corcuera-Arcega
2016	Wagas (Courageous Caitie Story)	Feliz Lucas
2016	Alamat: Alamat ng Saging	Juana (Voice Only)
2016	Karelasyon	Claire
2016	Poor Señorita	Angie Batumbakal
2016	Dear Uge: Single Teacher meets Single Dad	Luisa
2016	Dear Uge: My Millenial Mom	Rita
2017	Pinulot Ka Lang sa Lupa	Angeli "Geli" Martinez-Esquivel
2017	Wish Ko Lang: Miss Pulis	SPO3 Rowena Jacosalem
2017	D' Originals	Marjorie "Marge" Pineda-Tolentino
2017	3 Days of Summer	Herself
2017	Tadhana: Yaya Abogada	Chona
2017	Road Trip	Herself
2018	Sherlock Jr.	Meryl
2018	The Cure	Katrina Contes

== Awards and nominations ==
Year	Organization/Critics	Category	Work	Result
2005	StarStruck 2	4 Pre-Recognition Award		
2005	StarStruck 2	First Princess		
2006	FHM Philippines	Rank #65		
2007	FHM Philippines	Rank #45		
2008	FHM Philippines	Rank #89		
2010	Cinemalaya 2010	Best Supporting Actress	The Leaving	
2013	ENPRESS Golden Screen Awards	Best Performance by an Actress in a Leading Role (Drama)	Intoy Shokoy ng Kalye Marino	Nominated
2016	32nd PMPC Star Awards for Movies	Movie Actress of the Year	Ang Anino sa Likod ng Buwan	Nominated
2016	39th Gawad Urian Awards	Best Actress	Ang Anino sa Likod ng Buwan	Won

Awards and achievements
Preceded by Yasmien Kurdi	StarStruck; Runner-up; 2004 (season 2)	Succeeded by Iwa Moto
