= Lovestruck (film) =

2005 Filipino film

- Directed by: Louie Ignacio
- Screenplay by: Suzette Doctolero
- Story by: Annette Gozon-Abrogar
- Produced by: Jose Mari Abacan; Annette Gozon-Abrogar
- Starring: Jolina Magdangal; Jennylyn Mercado; Mark Herras; Mike Tan
- Cinematography: Vivencio Gonzales Jr.
- Edited by: Marya Ignacio
- Music by: Vince de Jesus
- Production company: GMA Films
- Distributed by: GMA Films
- Release date: September 14, 2005
- Running time: 112 minutes
- Country: Philippines
- Languages: Filipino; English
- Box office: 42 million

Lovestruck is a 2005 Philippine romantic comedy film directed by Louie Ignacio. The film stars Jolina Magdangal, Jennylyn Mercado, Mark Herras and Mike Tan.

The film is streaming online on YouTube.

== Cast ==
- Jolina Magdangal as Jandra
- Jennylyn Mercado as Denise
- Mark Herras as Joel
- Mike Tan as Jason
- Rainier Castillo as Cholo
- Yasmien Kurdi as Jojo
- Ryza Cenon as Myka
- CJ Muere as Cocoy
- LJ Reyes as Sophia
- Kirby de Jesus as Lloyd
- Lorna Tolentino as Cocoy and Myka's mother
- Gina Alajar as Amalia
- Keempee de Leon as Chico
- Allan K. as Allan
- Julio Diaz as Banjo

== Awards ==
Year	Awards	Category	Recipient	Result	Ref.
2006	3rd Golden Screen Awards	Best Performance by an Actress in a Leading Role-Musical or Comedy	Jennylyn Mercado	Nominated	
2006	22nd PMPC Star Awards for Movies	New Movie Actress of the Year	Ryza Cenon	Won	
2006	22nd PMPC Star Awards for Movies	New Movie Actress of the Year	LJ Reyes	Nominated	
2006	22nd PMPC Star Awards for Movies	New Movie Actor of the Year	Mike Tan	Nominated	
