= List of Ika-6 na Utos episodes =

Ika-6 na Utos was a Philippine television drama broadcast by GMA Network. It premiered on GMA Afternoon Prime block and worldwide on GMA Pinoy TV from December 5, 2016 to March 17, 2018, replacing Oh, My Mama!. Since April 1, 2017, the program expanded to Saturdays due to its immense popularity and high viewership, replacing Case Solved.

NUTAM (Nationwide Urban Television Audience Measurement) People in Television Homes ratings are provided by AGB Nielsen Philippines. The series ended, but its the 67th-week run, and with 383 episodes. It was replaced by Contessa.

== Series overview ==
Month	Episodes	Monthly averages
Month	Episodes	NUTAM
December 2016	20	8.9%
January 2017	21	8.9%
February 2017	23	9.7%
March 2017	20	9.7%
April 2017	20	9.1%
May 2017	27	8.2%
June 2017	26	7.9%
July 2017	26	8.3%
August 2017	27	8.4%
September 2017	26	8.3%
October 2017	26	7.7%
November 2017	26	7.8%
December 2017	26	7.7%
January 2018	27	7.7%
February 2018	24	8.3%
March 2018	15	7.9%
Total	383	8.4%

== Episodes ==
=== December 2016 ===
Episode		Original Air Date	Social Media Hashtag	AGB Nielsen NUTAM		
Episode		Original Air Date	Social Media Hashtag	Rating	Timeslot Rank	Ref.
1	Pilot	Monday, December 5, 2016	#Ika6NaUtos	11.9%	#1	
2	Emma's Savior	Tuesday, December 6, 2016	#IANUEmmasSavior	12.9%	#1	
3	Monster-in-Law	Wednesday, December 7, 2016	#IANUMonsterInLaw	11.5%	#2	
4	Georgia Is Back	Thursday, December 8, 2016	#IANUGeorgiaIsBack	11.7%	#2	
5	Marital Problem	Friday, December 9, 2016	#IANUMaritalProblem	11.9%	#2	
6	Pang-aakit ni Georgia (Georgia's Flirting)	Monday, December 12, 2016	#IANUPangaakitNiGeorgia	11.8%	#2	
7	Pagseselos (Jealousy)	Tuesday, December 13, 2016	#IANUPagseselos	13.3%	#2	
8	Seducing Rome	Wednesday, December 14, 2016	#IANUSeducingRome	11.9%	#2	
9	Hiram na Asawa (Borrowed Spouse)	Thursday, December 15, 2016	#IANUHiramNaAsawa	13.1%	#1	
10	Patibong (Trap)	Friday, December 16, 2016	#IANUPatibong	13.7%	#1	
11	Kahinaan (Weakness)	Monday, December 19, 2016	#IANUKahinaan	12.9%	#2	
12	Pagdadahilan (Reasoning)	Tuesday, December 20, 2016	#IANUPagdadahilan	13.3%	#1	
13	Georgia's Plan	Wednesday, December 21, 2016	#IANUGeorgiasPlan	13.1%	#2	
14	Panlalamig (Getting Cold)	Thursday, December 22, 2016	#IANUPanlalamig	12.7%	#1	
15	Pagkukumpara (Comparison)	Friday, December 23, 2016	#IANUPagkukumpara	12.5%	#2	
16	Hinala ni Emma (Emma's Suspicion)	Monday, December 26, 2016	#IANUHinalaNiEmma	12.0%	#1	
17	Pagseselos (Jealousy)	Tuesday, December 27, 2016	#IANUPagseselos	12.1%	#1	
18	Pagsugod sa Kabit (Facing with the Mistress)	Wednesday, December 28, 2016	#IANUPagsugodSaKabit	13.3%	#1	
19	Tutukan (Focus)	Thursday, December 29, 2016	#IANUTutukan	12.4%	#1	
20	Paglimot (Forgetting)	Friday, December 30, 2016	#IANUPaglimot	11.5%	#1	
Average						

=== January 2017 ===
Episode		Original Air Date	Social Media Hashtag	AGB Nielsen NUTAM		
Episode		Original Air Date	Social Media Hashtag	Rating	Timeslot Rank	Ref.
21	Pusong Sawi (Unfortunate Heart)	Monday, January 2, 2017	#IANUPusongSawi	12.7%	#1	
22	Utuin si Emma (Fooling Emma)	Tuesday, January 3, 2017	#IANUUtuinSiEmma	13.4%	#1	
23	Regalo ni Rome (Rome's Gift)	Wednesday, January 4, 2017	#IANURegaloNiRome	12.7%	#1	
24	Pag-iimbestiga (Investigation)	Thursday, January 5, 2017	#IANUPagiimbestiga	14.1%	#1	
25	Emma vs. Georgia	Friday, January 6, 2017	#IANUEmmaVsGeorgia	14.2%	#1	
26	Pagsisisi (Repentance)	Monday, January 9, 2017	#IANUPagsisisi	13.7%	#1	
27	Goodbye	Tuesday, January 10, 2017	#IANUGoodbye	14.8%	#1	
28	New Rules	Wednesday, January 11, 2017	#IANUNewRules	14.6%	#1	
29	Bantay Sarado (Guard Closed)	Thursday, January 12, 2017	#IANUBantaySarado	14.5%	#1	
30	Laban, Emma (Fight, Emma)	Friday, January 13, 2017	#IANULabanEmma	16.2%	#1	
31	Hidden Feelings	Monday, January 16, 2017	#IANUHiddenFeelings	13.8%	#1	
32	Surprise	Tuesday, January 17, 2017	#IANUSurprise	15.0%	#1	
33	Kasabwat (Accomplice)	Wednesday, January 18, 2017	#IANUKasabwat	14.8%	#1	
34	Emergency	Thursday, January 19, 2017	#IANUEmergency	13.5%	#1	
35	Pagseselos ni Rome (Rome's Jealousy)	Friday, January 20, 2017	#IANUPagseselosNiRome	14.3%	#1	
36	Eskandalo (Scandal)	Monday, January 23, 2017	#IANUEskandalo	13.5%	#1	
37	Paninindigan (Standing)	Tuesday, January 24, 2017	#IANUPaninindigan	14.3%	#1	
38	Pang-aapi (Oppression)	Wednesday, January 25, 2017	#IANUPangaapi	14.1%	#1	
39	Konsensiya (Conscience)	Thursday, January 26, 2017	#IANUKonsensiya	13.0%	#1	
40	Peligro (Danger)	Friday, January 27, 2017	#IANUPeligro	15.8%	#1	
41	Fake Text	Monday, January 30, 2017	#IANUFakeText	14.8%	#1	
42	Gigil (Annoyed)	Tuesday, January 31, 2017	#IANUGigil	14.4%	#1	
Average						

=== February 2017 ===
Episode		Original Air Date	Social Media Hashtag	AGB Nielsen NUTAM		
Episode		Original Air Date	Social Media Hashtag	Rating	Timeslot Rank	Ref.
43	Bangon, Emma (Rise, Emma)	Wednesday, February 1, 2017	#IANUBangonEmma	16.6%	#1	
44	Paghahabol (Claiming)	Thursday, February 2, 2017	#IANUPaghahabol	17.0%	#1	
45	Alone	Friday, February 3, 2017	#IANUAlone	16.6%	#1	
46	New Emma	Monday, February 6, 2017	#IANUNewEmma	19.9%	#1	
47	Annulment	Tuesday, February 7, 2017	#IANUAnnulment	18.0%	#1	
48	Bangungot (Nightmare)	Wednesday, February 8, 2017	#IANUBangungot	17.6%	#1	
49	Survivor	Thursday, February 9, 2017	#IANUSurvivor	18.0%	#1	
50	Paghaharap (Confrontation)	Friday, February 10, 2017	#IANUPaghaharap	18.0%	#1	
51	Panunumbat (Criticism)	Monday, February 13, 2017	#IANUPanunumbat	16.5%	#1	
52	Pangamba (Fear)	Tuesday, February 14, 2017	#IANUPangamba	17.0%	#1	
53	Viral Video	Wednesday, February 15, 2017	#IANUViralVideo	16.4%	#1	
54	Hinanakit (Anger)	Thursday, February 16, 2017	#IANUHinanakit	17.5%	#1	
55	Paliwanag (Explanation)	Friday, February 17, 2017	#IANUPaliwanag	16.9%	#1	
56	Bangayan (Conflict)	Monday, February 20, 2017	#IANUBangayan	16.9%	#1	
57	Seduction	Tuesday, February 21, 2017	#IANUSeduction	17.9%	#1	
58	Kompetisiyon (Competition)	Wednesday, February 22, 2017	#IANUKompetisiyon	18.9%	#1	
59	Panunukso (Temptation)	Thursday, February 23, 2017	#IANUPanunukso	20.0%	#1	
60	Kahihiyan (Shame)	Friday, February 24, 2017	#IANUKahihiyan	19.7%	#1	
61	Paninindigan (Standing)	Monday, February 27, 2017	#IANUPaninindigan	18.7%	#1	
62	Anniversary	Tuesday, February 28, 2017	#IANUAnniversary	18.4%	#1	
Average						

=== March 2017 ===
Episode		Original Air Date	Social Media Hashtag	AGB Nielsen NUTAM		
Episode		Original Air Date	Social Media Hashtag	Rating	Timeslot Rank	Ref.
63	Sumbatan (Blame)	Wednesday, March 1, 2017	#IANUSumbatan	20.8%	#1	
64	Laban Kung Laban (Fight Against)	Thursday, March 2, 2017	#IANULabanKungLaban	20.1%	#1	
65	Paasa (Hope)	Friday, March 3, 2017	#IANUPaasa	20.0%	#1	
66	Praning	Monday, March 6, 2017	#IANUPraning	19.1%	#1	
67	The Game	Tuesday, March 7, 2017	#IANUTheGame	19.5%	#1	
68	Panunugod (Predestination)	Wednesday, March 8, 2017	#IANUPanunugod	20.0%	#1	
69	Ganti ni Emma (Emma's Reward)	Thursday, March 9, 2017	#IANUGantiNiEmma	19.2%	#1	
70	Emergency	Friday, March 10, 2017	#IANUEmergency	19.5%	#1	
71	Mahal Pa Rin (Still Love)	Monday, March 13, 2017	#IANUMahalPaRin	—N/a		
72	Malaking Hadlang (Big Barrier)	Tuesday, March 14, 2017	#IANUMalakingHadlang	—N/a		
73	Double Proposal	Wednesday, March 15, 2017	#IANUDoubleProposal	—N/a		
74	Sagupaan (Encounter)	Thursday, March 16, 2017	#IANUSagupaan	—N/a		
75	Selosan (Jealousy)	Friday, March 17, 2017	#IANUSelosan	—N/a		
76	Marry Me Emma	Monday, March 20, 2017	#IANUMarryMeEmma	—N/a		
77	Emma's Decision	Tuesday, March 21, 2017	#IANUEmmasDecision	—N/a		
78	Engaged	Wednesday, March 22, 2017	#IANUEngaged	—N/a		
79	Request ni Austin (Austin's Request)	Thursday, March 23, 2017	#IANURequestNiAustin	—N/a		
80	Too Late	Friday, March 24, 2017	#IANUTooLate	—N/a		
				AGB Nielsen NUTAM People		
81	The Wedding Is On	Monday, March 27, 2017	#IANUTheWeddingIsOn	7.7%	#1	
82	Paghahanda (Preparation)	Tuesday, March 28, 2017	#IANUPaghahanda	8.0%	#1	
83	Rivalry	Wednesday, March 29, 2017	#IANURivalry	8.2%	#1	
84	Bridal War	Thursday, March 30, 2017	#IANUBridalWar	8.7%	#1	
85	Mutual Feelings	Friday, March 31, 2017	#IANUMutualFeelings	9.6%	#1	
Average						

=== April 2017 ===
Episode		Original Air Date	Social Media Hashtag	AGB Nielsen NUTAM People		
Episode		Original Air Date	Social Media Hashtag	Rating	Daytime Rank	Ref.
86	Secret ni Emma (Emma's Secret)	Saturday, April 1, 2017	#IANUSecretNiEmma	9.1%	#1	
87	Guilty as Charged	Monday, April 3, 2017	#IANUGuiltyAsCharged	9.0%	#1	
88	Come with Me	Tuesday, April 4, 2017	#IANUComeWithMe	8.3%	#1	
89	Kritikal (Critical)	Wednesday, April 5, 2017	#IANUKritikal	8.7%	#1	
90	Flatline	Thursday, April 6, 2017	#IANUFlatline	8.6%	#1	
91	Change of Plans	Friday, April 7, 2017	#IANUChangeOfPlans	9.0%	#1	
92	The Choice	Saturday, April 8, 2017	#IANUTheChoice	7.4%	#1	
93	Emma's Promise	Monday, April 10, 2017	#IANUEmmasPromise	8.1%	#1	
94	Pangamba (Anxiety)	Tuesday, April 11, 2017	#IANUPangamba	9.0%	#1	
95	Pagkabigo (Failure)	Wednesday, April 12, 2017	#IANUPagkabigo	8.6%	#1	
96	Pagbubuntis (Pregnancy)	Monday, April 17, 2017	#IANUPagbubuntis	8.0%	#1	
97	Banta ni Georgia (Georgia Threat)	Tuesday, April 18, 2017	#IANUBantaNiGeorgia	8.0%	#1	
98	Emotional Blackmail	Wednesday, April 19, 2017	#IANUEmotionalBlackmail	7.9%	#1	
99	Engagement Party	Thursday, April 20, 2017	#IANUEngagementParty	7.8%	#1	
100	Buking	Friday, April 21, 2017	#IANUBuking	8.3%	#1	
101	Pagbubunyag (Disclosure)	Saturday, April 22, 2017	#IANUPagbubunyag	7.8%	#1	
102	Eskandalosa (Scandal)	Monday, April 24, 2017	#IANUEskandalosa	8.9%	#1	
103	Bawi ni Emma (Emma's Recovery)	Tuesday, April 25, 2017	#IANUBawiNiEmma	7.8%	#1	
104	Buntis for Real (Pregnant for Real)	Wednesday, April 26, 2017	#IANUBuntisForReal	8.2%	#1	
105	Humility	Thursday, April 27, 2017	#IANUHumility	8.4%	#1	
106	Looking for Austin	Friday, April 28, 2017	#IANULookingForAustin	7.7%	#1	
107	The Search	Saturday, April 29, 2017	#IANUTheSearch	7.9%	#1	
Average						

=== May 2017 ===
Episode		Original Air Date	Social Media Hashtag	AGB Nielsen NUTAM People		
Episode		Original Air Date	Social Media Hashtag	Rating	Timeslot Rank	Ref.
108	Rescuing Austin	Monday, May 1, 2017	#IANURescuingAustin	8.0%	#1	
109	Red Alert	Tuesday, May 2, 2017	#IANURedAlert	8.0%	#1	
110	Para kay Austin (For Austin)	Wednesday, May 3, 2017	#IANUParaKayAustin	8.2%	#1	
111	Pamamaalam (Farewell)	Thursday, May 4, 2017	#IANUPamamaalam	8.0%	#1	
112	Dalamhati (Grief)	Friday, May 5, 2017	#IANUDalamhati	8.3%	#1	
113	Goodbye	Saturday, May 6, 2017	#IANUGoodbye	8.3%	#1	
114	Burol (Hill)	Monday, May 8, 2017	#IANUBurol	8.2%	#1	
115	Sulat ni Austin (Austin's Letter)	Tuesday, May 9, 2017	#IANUSulatNiAustin	7.8%	#1	
116	Pangungulila (Loneliness)	Wednesday, May 10, 2017	#IANUPangungulila	7.2%	#1	
117	Buntis si Emma (Emma's Pregnant)	Thursday, May 11, 2017	#IANUBuntisSiEmma	7.8%	#1	
118	Kabuwanan (Monthly)	Friday, May 12, 2017	#IANUKabuwanan	7.7%	#1	
119	Pagwawala ni Angelo (Angelo's Loss)	Saturday, May 13, 2017	#IANUPagwawalaNiAngelo	8.3%	#1	
120	Pagbubuntis ni Emma (Emma's Pregnancy)	Monday, May 15, 2017	#IANUPagbubuntisNiEmma	6.8%	#1	
121	Pagtanggap (Acceptance)	Tuesday, May 16, 2017	#IANUPagtanggap	7.5%	#1	
122	Plano ni Angelo (Angelo's Plan)	Wednesday, May 17, 2017	#IANUPlanoNiAngelo	7.3%	#1	
123	Acceptance	Thursday, May 18, 2017	#IANUAcceptance	8.0%	#1	
124	Agawan (Conflict)	Friday, May 19, 2017	#IANUAgawan	8.4%	#1	
125	Rome's Investigation	Saturday, May 20, 2017	#IANURomesInvestigation	8.5%	#1	
126	Disgrasya (Disgrace)	Monday, May 22, 2017	#IANUDisgrasya	8.7%	#1	
127	Babala (Warning)	Tuesday, May 23, 2017	#IANUBabala	8.7%	#1	
128	Baby Bump	Wednesday, May 24, 2017	#IANUBabyBump	9.2%	#1	
129	Espiya (Spy)	Thursday, May 25, 2017	#IANUEspiya	9.1%	#1	
130	Kapahamakan (Disaster)	Friday, May 26, 2017	#IANUKapahamakan	9.3%	#1	
131	Paglilihim (Secret)	Saturday, May 27, 2017	#IANUPaglilihim	8.4%	#1	
132	Tunay na Ama (Real Father)	Monday, May 29, 2017	#IANUTunayNaAma	8.7%	#1	
133	Imbestigador (Investigator)	Tuesday, May 30, 2017	#IANUImbestigador	8.7%	#1	
134	Saklolo (Help)	Wednesday, May 31, 2017	#IANUSaklolo	8.4%	#1	
Average						

=== June 2017 ===
Episode		Original Air Date	Social Media Hashtag	AGB Nielsen NUTAM People		
Episode		Original Air Date	Social Media Hashtag	Rating	Timeslot Rank	Ref.
135	Nasaan si Milan (Where's Milan)	Thursday, June 1, 2017	#IANUNasaanSiMilan	8.8%	#1	
136	Sisihan (Blame)	Friday, June 2, 2017	#IANUSisihan	8.6%	#1	
137	Anak ni Georgia (Georgia's Daughter)	Saturday, June 3, 2017	#IANUAnakNiGeorgia	8.3%	#1	
138	Baby Sydney	Monday, June 5, 2017	#IANUBabySydney	7.1%	#1	
139	Kutob	Tuesday, June 6, 2017	#IANUKutob	6.7%	#1	
140	Proposal ni Angelo (Angelo's Proposal)	Wednesday, June 7, 2017	#IANUProposalNiAngelo	7.2%	#1	
141	Pagtatagpo (Encounter)	Thursday, June 8, 2017	#IANUPagtatagpo	7.3%	#1	
142	Tunay na mag-ina (Real Mother)	Friday, June 9, 2017	#IANUTunayNaMagIna	8.2%	#1	
143	Mix-up	Saturday, June 10, 2017	#IANUMixUp	9.1%	#1	
144	Lukso ng Dugo (Leap of Blood)	Monday, June 12, 2017	#IANULuksoNgDugo	8.6%	#1	
145	Getting Closer	Tuesday, June 13, 2017	#IANUGettingCloser	7.4%	#1	
146	Flowers for Emma	Wednesday, June 14, 2017	#IANUFlowersForEmma	7.8%	#1	
147	Duda ni Georgia (Georgia's Doubt)	Thursday, June 15, 2017	#IANUDudaNiGeorgia	7.7%	#1	
148	Kawawang Sydney (Poor Sydney)	Friday, June 16, 2017	#IANUKawawangSydney	8.0%	#1	
149	Dalawang ina (Two Mothers)	Saturday, June 17, 2017	#IANUDalawangIna	9.3%	#1	
150	Sikreto ni Georgia (Georgia's Secret)	Monday, June 19, 2017	#IANUSikretoNiGeorgia	7.0%	#1	
151	Bagong Hamon (New Challenge)	Tuesday, June 20, 2017	#IANUBagongHamon	7.4%	#1	
152	Welcome Geneva	Wednesday, June 21, 2017	#IANUWelcomeGeneva	7.7%	#1	
153	Caught in the Act	Thursday, June 22, 2017	#IANUCaughtInTheAct	7.5%	#1	
154	I Want Tita Emma (I want Aunt Emma)	Friday, June 23, 2017	#IANUIWantTitaEmma	8.1%	#1	
155	Ngitngit ni Georgia (Georgia's Darkness)	Saturday, June 24, 2017	#IANUNgitngitNiGeorgia	8.2%	#1	
156	Paawa ni Georgia (Pardon of Georgia)	Monday, June 26, 2017	#IANUPaawaNiGeorgia	9.0%	#1	
157	Child Custody	Tuesday, June 27, 2017	#IANUChildCustody	8.2%	#1	
158	Court's Decision	Wednesday, June 28, 2017	#IANUCourtsDecision	6.6%	#1	
159	Missing Sydney	Thursday, June 29, 2017	#IANUMissingSydney	7.6%	#1	
160	Lihim ni Emma (Secret of Emma)	Friday, June 30, 2017	#IANULihimNiEmma	7.2%	#1	
Average						

=== July 2017 ===
Episode		Original Air Date	Social Media Hashtag	AGB Nielsen NUTAM People		
Episode		Original Air Date	Social Media Hashtag	Rating	Timeslot Rank	Ref.
161	"Magkapatid" (Siblings)	Saturday, July 1, 2017	#IANUMagkapatid	9.1%	#1	
162	Pagkikita ng Magkapatid (Sibling Meetings)	Monday, July 3, 2017	#IANUPagkikitaNgMagkapatid	6.7%	#1	
163	Damit ni Emma (Emma's Clothes)	Tuesday, July 4, 2017	#IANUDamitNiEmma	7.5%	#1	
164	Paramdam ni Loleng (Loleng's Feeling)	Wednesday, July 5, 2017	#IANUParamdamNiLoleng	7.3%	#1	
165	Paggising ni Loleng (Loleng's Awakening)	Thursday, July 6, 2017	#IANUPaggisingNiLoleng	7.5%	#1	
166	Panganib sa Buhay (Life Danger)	Friday, July 7, 2017	#IANUPanganibSaBuhay	8.0%	#1	
167	Bantay Sarado (Guard Closed)	Saturday, July 8, 2017	#IANUBantaySarado	8.9%	#1	
168	Plano ni Geneva (Geneva's Plan)	Monday, July 10, 2017	#IANUPlanoNiGeneva	7.1%	#1	
169	Big Decision	Tuesday, July 11, 2017	#IANUBigDecision	7.6%	#1	
170	Bagong Pasabog (New Explosion)	Wednesday, July 12, 2017	#IANUBagongPasabog	7.1%	#1	
171	Truth is Out	Thursday, July 13, 2017	#IANUTruthIsOut	7.5%	#1	
172	Harapan Na (Facing)	Friday, July 14, 2017	#IANUHarapanNa	7.3%	#1	
173	Paglalantad (Explosing)	Saturday, July 15, 2017	#IANUPaglalantad	9.5%	#1	
174	Paniningil (Billing)	Monday, July 17, 2017	#IANUPaniningil	8.2%	#1	
175	Puno na si Rome (Full Rome)	Tuesday, July 18, 2017	#IANUPunoNaSiRome	8.4%	#1	
176	Together Again	Wednesday, July 19, 2017	#IANUTogetherAgain	8.6%	#1	
177	"Intimate Moment"	Thursday, July 20, 2017	#IANUIntimateMoment	8.3%	#1	
178	"Paghahanda ni Emma" (Emma's Preparation)	Friday, July 21, 2017	#IANUPaghahandaNiEmma	7.9%	#1	
179	"Walang urungan" (No Retreat)	Saturday, July 22, 2017	#IANUWalangUrungan	9.6%	#1	
180	"Gantihan" (Revenge)	Monday, July 24, 2017	#IANUGantihan	9.4%	#1	
181	"Poot ni Emma" (Emma's Hate)	Tuesday, July 25, 2017	#IANUPootNiEmma	7.5%	#1	
182	"Karma Time"	Wednesday, July 26, 2017	#IANUKarmaTime	9.2%	#1	
183	"Pagdurusa ni Georgia" (Georgia's Suffering)	Thursday, July 27, 2017	#IANUPagdurusaNiGeorgia	10.2%	#1	
184	"Paniningil" (Billing)	Friday, July 28, 2017	#IANUPaniningil	10.7%	#1	
185	"Kabayaran" (Revenge)	Saturday, July 29, 2017	#IANUKabayaran	10.5%	#1	
186	"Atake ni Geneva" (Geneva Attack)	Monday, July 31, 2017	#IANUAtakeNiGeneva	7.3%	#1	
Average						

=== August 2017 ===
Episode		Original Air Date	Social Media Hashtag	AGB Nielsen NUTAM People		
Episode		Original Air Date	Social Media Hashtag	Rating	Timeslot Rank	Ref.
187	Magkapatid vs. Emma (Siblings vs. Emma)	Tuesday, August 1, 2017	#IANUMagkapatidVsEmma	7.6%	#1	
188	Double Team	Wednesday, August 2, 2017	#IANUDoubleTeam	8.5%	#1	
189	Sindakan	Thursday, August 3, 2017	#IANUSindakan	7.4%	#1	
190	Negosyo Wars (Business Wars)	Friday, August 4, 2017	#IANUNegosyoWars	8.9%	#1	
191	Thank You Rome	Saturday, August 5, 2017	#IANUThankYouRome	9.6%	#1	
192	Dinner Gone Wrong	Monday, August 7, 2017	#IANUDinnerGoneWrong	7.9%	#1	
193	Ayaw Patalo (Don't Lose)	Tuesday, August 8, 2017	#IANUAyawPatalo	7.6%	#1	
194	Pagbabalik ni Loleng (Loleng's Return)	Wednesday, August 9, 2017	#IANUPagbabalikNiLoleng	8.0%	#1	
195	Loleng	Thursday, August 10, 2017	#IANULoleng	7.6%	#1	
196	Peligroso (Risky)	Friday, August 11, 2017	#IANUPeligroso	7.9%	#1	
197	Loleng Is Back	Saturday, August 12, 2017	#IANULolengIsBack	9.2%	#1	
198	Say Yes, Emma	Monday, August 14, 2017	#IANUSayYesEmma	8.1%	#1	
199	I Love You, Emma	Tuesday, August 15, 2017	#IANUILoveYouEmma	7.2%	#1	
200	Paglubog (Sinking)	Wednesday, August 16, 2017	#IANUPaglubog	7.9%	#1	
201	Pagbabalikan (Returning)	Thursday, August 17, 2017	#IANUPagbabalikan	7.8%	#1	
202	Engagement	Friday, August 18, 2017	#IANUEngagement	7.6%	#1	
203	Engagement Party	Saturday, August 19, 2017	#IANUEngagementParty	9.3%	#1	
204	Unwanted Guests	Monday, August 21, 2017	#IANUUnwantedGuests	9.1%	#1	
205	Desperado (Desperate)	Tuesday, August 22, 2017	#IANUDesperado	9.1%	#1	
206	Masamang Balak (Bad Intentions)	Wednesday, August 23, 2017	#IANUMasamangBalak	8.8%	#1	
207	Huli sa CCTV (CCTV Late)	Thursday, August 24, 2017	#IANUHuliSaCCTV	8.2%	#1	
208	No More Lies	Friday, August 25, 2017	#IANUNoMoreLies	8.8%	#1	
209	Pagpapaalam (Letting Go)	Saturday, August 26, 2017	#IANUPagpapaalam	9.7%	#1	
210	Abduction	Monday, August 28, 2017	#IANUAbduction	9.4%	#1	
211	Nasaan si Angelo (Where's Angelo)	Tuesday, August 29, 2017	#IANUNasaanSiAngelo	8.8%	#1	
212	Rebelasyon (Revelation)	Wednesday, August 30, 2017	#IANURebelasyon	8.0%	#1	
213	Paalam, Angelo (Goodbye, Angelo)	Thursday, August 31, 2017	#IANUPaalamAngelo	7.7%	#1	
Average						

=== September 2017 ===
Episode		Original Air Date	Social Media Hashtag	AGB Nielsen NUTAM People		
Episode		Original Air Date	Social Media Hashtag	Rating	Timeslot Rank	Ref.
214	"Pagdidiin" (Pressure)	Friday, September 1, 2017	#IANUPagdidiin	9.4%	#1	
215	Suspek (Suspect)	Saturday, September 2, 2017	#IANUSuspek	8.3%	#1	
216	Pagtakas (Escape)	Monday, September 4, 2017	#IANUPagtakas	7.6%	#1	
217	Suspect	Tuesday, September 5, 2017	#IANUSuspect	8.6%	#1	
218	Biktima (Victim)	Wednesday, September 6, 2017	#IANUBiktima	8.7%	#1	
219	Matinding Pagsubok (Severe Trial)	Thursday, September 7, 2017	#IANUMatindingPagsubok	8.1%	#1	
220	Bilin ni Angelo (Order of Angelo)	Friday, September 8, 2017	#IANUBilinNiAngelo	8.2%	#1	
221	Kasabwat (Conspiracy)	Saturday, September 9, 2017	#IANUKasabwat	8.4%	#1	
222	Pahiwatig (Hint)	Monday, September 11, 2017	#IANUPahiwatig	9.0%	#1	
223	Court Trial	Tuesday, September 12, 2017	#IANUCourtTrial	9.9%	#1	
224	Depressed Rome	Wednesday, September 13, 2017	#IANUDepressedRome	8.5%	#1	
225	Paghihigpit (Restriction)	Thursday, September 14, 2017	#IANUPaghihigpit	8.1%	#1	
226	Sulat (Letter)	Friday, September 15, 2017	#IANUSulat	7.6%	#1	
227	Nasaan si Milan (Where is Milan)	Saturday, September 16, 2017	#IANUNasaanSiMilan	9.0%	#1	
228	Kapit Lang (Closer)	Monday, September 18, 2017	#IANUKapitLang	7.6%	#1	
229	Pagkilos (Action)	Tuesday, September 19, 2017	#IANUPagkilos	—N/a		
230	Dead End	Wednesday, September 20, 2017	#IANUDeadEnd	—N/a		
231	Ang Saksi (The Witness)	Thursday, September 21, 2017	#IANUAngSaksi	9.1%	#1	
232	Red Alert	Friday, September 22, 2017	#IANURedAlert	7.8%	#1	
233	Rome	Saturday, September 23, 2017	#IANURome	8.4%	#1	
234	Jordan	Monday, September 25, 2017	#IANUJordan	7.0%	#1	
235	Pagbabago (Change)	Tuesday, September 26, 2017	#IANUPagbabago	7.7%	#1	
236	Motibo (Motive)	Wednesday, September 27, 2017	#IANUMotibo	7.2%	#1	
237	Pagpapatawad (Forgiveness)	Thursday, September 28, 2017	#IANUPagpapatawad	7.4%	#1	
238	Pagtatago (Hiding)	Friday, September 29, 2017	#IANUPagtatago	7.5%	#1	
239	Pagtatagpo (Encountering)	Saturday, September 30, 2017	#IANUPagtatagpo	8.9%	#1	
Average						

=== October 2017 ===
Episode		Original Air Date	Social Media Hashtag	AGB Nielsen NUTAM People		
Episode		Original Air Date	Social Media Hashtag	Rating	Timeslot Rank	Ref.
240	"Therapy"	Monday, October 2, 2017	#IANUTherapy	7.5%	#1	
241	Pangamba (Fear)	Tuesday, October 3, 2017	#IANUPangamba	7.4%	#1	
242	Desperate Moves	Wednesday, October 4, 2017	#IANUDesperateMoves	6.7%	#1	
243	Patunay (Proof)	Thursday, October 5, 2017	#IANUPatunay	7.4%	#1	
244	DNA Test	Friday, October 6, 2017	#IANUDNATest	6.8%	#1	
245	Death Anniversary	Saturday, October 7, 2017	#IANUDeathAnniversary	7.1%	#1	
246	Paglalapit (Approach)	Monday, October 9, 2017	#IANUPaglalapit	6.8%	#1	
247	The Discovery	Tuesday, October 10, 2017	#IANUTheDiscovery	7.5%	#1	
248	Kampihan (Side)	Wednesday, October 11, 2017	#IANUKampihan	7.4%	#1	
249	Muling Paghaharap (Confrontation Again)	Thursday, October 12, 2017	#IANUMulingPaghaharap	7.1%	#1	
250	Paglalapit ng Loob (Intimacy)	Friday, October 13, 2017	#IANUPaglalapitNgLoob	7.7%	#1	
251	Pagdalaw (Visitation)	Saturday, October 14, 2017	#IANUPagdalaw	8.9%	#1	
252	Chef J	Monday, October 16, 2017	#IANUChefJ	8.1%	#1	
253	Sydney vs Chelsea	Tuesday, October 17, 2017	#IANUSydneyVsChelsea	8.4%	#1	
254	Boses (Voice)	Wednesday, October 18, 2017	#IANUBoses	7.1%	#1	
255	Patibong Ni Maui (Maui's Trap)	Thursday, October 19, 2017	#Ika6NaUtos	7.2%	#1	
256	Recovering	Friday, October 20, 2017	#IANURecovering	7.4%	#1	
257	Fate	Saturday, October 21, 2017	#IANUFate	7.7%	#1	
258	Malikmata (Mirror)	Monday, October 23, 2017	#IANUMalikmata	8.1%	#1	
259	Rome on TV	Tuesday, October 24, 2017	#IANURomeOnTV	7.0%	#1	
260	Finding Rome	Wednesday, October 25, 2017	#IANUFindingRome	7.3%	#1	
261	Batangas Face Off	Thursday, October 26, 2017	#IANUBatangasFaceOff	8.6%	#1	
262	Nagkrus na Landas (Crossed Path)	Friday, October 27, 2017	#IANUNagkrusNaLandas	8.0%	#1	
263	Mensahe ng Kalapati (Dove's Message)	Saturday, October 28, 2017	#IANUMensaheNgKalapati	9.1%	#1	
264	One Ferry Ride	Monday, October 30, 2017	#IANUOneFerryRide	7.8%	#1	
265	Hello, Boss J	Tuesday, October 31, 2017	#IANUHelloBossJ	9.0%	#1	
Average						

=== November 2017 ===
Episode		Original Air Date	Social Media Hashtag	AGB Nielsen NUTAM People		
Episode		Original Air Date	Social Media Hashtag	Rating	Timeslot Rank	Ref.
266	Kita Kita (Earning Income)	Wednesday, November 1, 2017	#IANUKitaKita	8.6%	#1	
267	Rome Is Alive	Thursday, November 2, 2017	#IANURomeIsAlive	8.5%	#1	
268	The Proof	Friday, November 3, 2017	#IANUTheProof	8.7%	#1	
269	Face to Face	Saturday, November 4, 2017	#IANUFaceToFace	8.7%	#1	
270	Pagkikita ng Mag-ama (Encountering Fatherhood)	Monday, November 6, 2017	#Ika6NaUtos	8.3%	#1	
271	Karma	Tuesday, November 7, 2017	#IANUKarma	8.1%	#1	
272	Shared Experience	Wednesday, November 8, 2017	#IANUSharedExperience	7.5%	#1	
273	Alibi	Thursday, November 9, 2017	#IANUAlibi	7.5%	#1	
274	Dinner Date	Friday, November 10, 2017	#IANUDinnerDate	8.1%	#1	
275	Muling Pagkikita ng Mag-ama (Reconnecting Fatherhood)	Saturday, November 11, 2017	#Ika6NaUtos	8.0%	#1	
276	Surprise for Emma	Monday, November 13, 2017	#IANUSurpriseForEmma	6.9%	#1	
277	Tuliro (Puzzling)	Tuesday, November 14, 2017	#IANUTuliro	7.3%	#1	
278	Torn	Wednesday, November 15, 2017	#IANUTorn	7.2%	#1	
279	Duda (Doubt)	Thursday, November 16, 2017	#IANUDuda	7.1%	#1	
280	White Lies	Friday, November 17, 2017	#IANUWhiteLies	7.6%	#1	
281	Realization	Saturday, November 18, 2017	#IANURealization	7.4%	#1	
282	Lihim (Secret)	Monday, November 20, 2017	#IANULihim	7.3%	#1	
283	Iwas (Avoidance)	Tuesday, November 21, 2017	#IANUIwas	7.1%	#1	
284	Cornered	Wednesday, November 22, 2017	#IANUCornered	7.5%	#1	
285	Harapan (Face)	Thursday, November 23, 2017	#IANUHarapan	7.2%	#1	
286	Aminan (Belief)	Friday, November 24, 2017	#IANUAminan	8.4%	#1	
287	Ebidensiya (Evidence)	Saturday, November 25, 2017	#IANUEbidensiya	8.2%	#1	
288	Pagbawi (Recovery)	Monday, November 27, 2017	#IANUPagbawi	—N/a		
289	Tunay na Mahal (True Love)	Tuesday, November 28, 2017	#IANUTunayNaMahal	—N/a		
290	Sinungaling (Liar)	Wednesday, November 29, 2017	#IANUSinungaling	—N/a		
291	Katunayan (Proof)	Thursday, November 30, 2017	#IANUKatunayan	—N/a		
Average						

=== December 2017 ===
Episode		Original Air Date	Social Media Hashtag	AGB Nielsen NUTAM People		
Episode		Original Air Date	Social Media Hashtag	Rating	Timeslot Rank	Ref.
292	"Traydor" (Traitor)	Friday, December 1, 2017	#IANUTraydor	7.4%	#1	
293	"Habulan" (Chase)	Saturday, December 2, 2017	#IANUHabulan	8.3%	#1	
294	"Mother Knows Best"	Monday, December 4, 2017	#IANUMotherKnowsBest	8.1%	#1	
295	"Lukso ng Dugo" (Leap of Blood)	Tuesday, December 5, 2017	#IANULuksoNgDugo	8.3%	#1	
296	"Totoong Resulta" (Real Results)	Wednesday, December 6, 2017	#IANUTotoongResulta	8.1%	#1	
297	"Nalilito" (Confused)	Thursday, December 7, 2017	#IANUNalilito	7.7%	#1	
298	"Paghabol" (Chasing)	Friday, December 8, 2017	#IANUPaghabol	8.9%	#1	
299	"Rome's Choice"	Saturday, December 9, 2017	#IANURomesChoice	8.8%	#1	
300	"Sanib Pwersa" (Joint Force)	Monday, December 11, 2017	#IANUSanibPwersa	7.5%	#1	
301	"Pagtanggap" (Acceptance)	Tuesday, December 12, 2017	#IANUPagtanggap	7.7%	#1	
302	"Coming Home"	Wednesday, December 13, 2017	#IANUComingHome	7.3%	#1	
303	"I Miss You"	Thursday, December 14, 2017	#IANUIMissYou	7.8%	#1	
304	"Hiling" (Request)	Friday, December 15, 2017	#IANUHiling	7.6%	#1	
305	"Pagkakalayo" (Distance)	Saturday, December 16, 2017	#IANUPagkakalayo	8.4%	#1	
306	"Totoong Pamilya" (Real Family)	Monday, December 18, 2017	#IANUTotoongPamilya	8.1%	#1	
307	"Bestfriend"	Tuesday, December 19, 2017	#IANUBestfriend	7.7%	#1	
308	"Pag-aalaga" (Care)	Wednesday, December 20, 2017	#IANUPagAalaga	7.0%	#1	
309	"Tiwala" (Trust)	Thursday, December 21, 2017	#IANUTiwala	7.4%	#1	
310	"Kasunduan" (Agreement)	Friday, December 22, 2017	#IANUKasunduan	8.1%	#1	
311	"The Vow"	Saturday, December 23, 2017	#IANUTheVow	6.7%	#1	
312	"Kasalan" (Marriage)	Monday, December 25, 2017	#IANUKasalan	5.4%	#1	
313	"Jealous"	Tuesday, December 26, 2017	#IANUJealous	7.1%	#1	
314	"Fake Mom"	Wednesday, December 27, 2017	#IANUFakeMom	8.0%	#1	
315	"Georgia's Heartbreak"	Thursday, December 28, 2017	#IANUGeorgiasHeartbreak	8.2%	#1	
316	"Regalo" (Gifts)	Friday, December 29, 2017	#IANURegalo	7.5%	#1	
317	"Pasabog" (Explosion)	Saturday, December 30, 2017	#IANUPasabog	7.7%	#1	
Average						

=== January 2018 ===
Episode		Original Air Date	Social Media Hashtag	AGB Nielsen NUTAM People		
Episode		Original Air Date	Social Media Hashtag	Rating	Timeslot Rank	Ref.
318	"Sisihan" (Blame)	Monday, January 1, 2018	#IANUSisihan	6.8%	#1	
319	"Alaga" (Pet)	Tuesday, January 2, 2018	#IANUAlaga	8.1%	#1	
320	"Bagong Pagsubok" (New Trial)	Wednesday, January 3, 2018	#IANUBagongPagsubok	7.4%	#1	
321	"Biktima" (Victim)	Thursday, January 4, 2018	#IANUBiktima	8.0%	#1	
322	"Distansya" (Distance)	Friday, January 5, 2018	#IANUDistansya	7.7%	#1	
323	"Hiwalay" (Separate)	Saturday, January 6, 2018	#IANUHiwalay	8.1%	#1	
324	"Atensyon" (Attention)	Monday, January 8, 2018	#IANUAtensyon	7.4%	#1	
325	"Kasabwat" (Conspirator)	Tuesday, January 9, 2018	#IANUKasabwat	7.2%	#1	
326	"Larawan" (Picture)	Wednesday, January 10, 2018	#IANULarawan	6.9%	#1	
327	"Saksi" (Witness)	Thursday, January 11, 2018	#IANUSaksi	7.9%	#1	
328	"Palusot" (Intrusion)	Friday, January 12, 2018	#IANUPalusot	7.7%	#1	
329	"Seduction"	Saturday, January 13, 2018	#IANUSeduction	9.2%	#1	
330	"Buking" (Seen)	Monday, January 15, 2018	#IANUBuking	8.0%	#1	
331	"Desperada" (Desperate)	Tuesday, January 16, 2018	#IANUDesperada	7.5%	#1	
332	"Blackmail"	Wednesday, January 17, 2018	#IANUBlackmail	7.6%	#1	
333	"Kustodiya" (Custody)	Thursday, January 18, 2018	#IANUKustodiya	8.0%	#1	
334	"Pagtakas" (Escape)	Friday, January 19, 2018	#IANUPagtakas	7.7%	#1	
335	"The Heart Never Forgets"	Saturday, January 20, 2018	#IANUTheHeartNeverForgets	7.9%	#1	
336	"Paalam, Jordan" (Farewell, Jordan)	Monday, January 22, 2018	#IANUPaalamJordan	7.3%	#1	
337	"Pagtatago" (Concealment)	Tuesday, January 23, 2018	#IANUPagtatago	7.2%	#1	
338	"Pagpapanggap" (Pretense)	Wednesday, January 24, 2018	#IANUPagpapanggap	7.8%	#1	
339	"Katibayan" (Evidence)	Thursday, January 25, 2018	#IANUKatibayan	8.0%	#1	
340	"Attempt"	Friday, January 26, 2018	#IANUAttempt	7.5%	#1	
341	"Rescue Mission"	Saturday, January 27, 2018	#IANURescueMission	9.4%	#1	
342	"Engkwentro" (Encounters)	Monday, January 29, 2018	#IANUEngkwentro	7.6%	#1	
343	"Away Kapatid" (Sister Fight)	Tuesday, January 30, 2018	#IANUAwayKapatid	7.5%	#1	
344	"Pagbawi" (Recovery)	Wednesday, January 31, 2018	#IANUPagbawi	7.7%	#1	
Average						

=== February 2018 ===
Episode		Original Air Date	Social Media Hashtag	AGB Nielsen NUTAM People		
Episode		Original Air Date	Social Media Hashtag	Rating	Timeslot Rank	Ref.
345	"Pagtunton" (Tracing)	Thursday, February 1, 2018	#IANUPagtunton	7.6%	#1	
346	"Walang Sala" (Not Guilty)	Friday, February 2, 2018	#IANUWalangSala	7.8%	#1	
347	"Kakampi" (Ally)	Saturday, February 3, 2018	#IANUKakampi	7.8%	#1	
348	"Paranoia"	Monday, February 5, 2018	#IANUParanoia	7.6%	#1	
349	"Loleng"	Tuesday, February 6, 2018	#IANULoleng	7.3%	#1	
350	"Pagpapahirap" (Torture)	Wednesday, February 7, 2018	#IANUPagpapahirap	7.4%	#1	
351	"Dalamhati" (Heart)	Thursday, February 8, 2018	#IANUDalamhati	7.8%	#1	
352	"Sumbong" (Report)	Friday, February 9, 2018	#IANUSumbong	7.9%	#1	
353	"Arestado" (Arrested)	Saturday, February 10, 2018	#IANUArestado	8.6%	#1	
354	"Balik Kulungan" (Back To Jail)	Monday, February 12, 2018	#IANUBalikKulungan	7.4%	#1	
355	"Apela" (Appeal)	Tuesday, February 13, 2018	#IANUApela	7.5%	#1	
356	"Banta" (Threat)	Wednesday, February 14, 2018	#IANUBanta	7.8%	#1	
357	"Ipit" (Pinch)	Thursday, February 15, 2018	#IANUIpit	7.8%	#1	
358	"Paglantad" (Exposure)	Friday, February 16, 2018	#IANUPaglantad	9.9%	#1	
359	"Case Closed"	Saturday, February 17, 2018	#IANUCaseClosed	9.7%	#1	
360	"Paghahanap" (Search)	Monday, February 19, 2018	#IANUPaghahanap	8.3%	#1	
361	"Tuso" (Cunning)	Tuesday, February 20, 2018	#IANUTuso	9.2%	#1	
362	"Pananakot" (Intimidation)	Wednesday, February 21, 2018	#IANUPananakot	7.9%	#1	
363	"Determinado" (Determined)	Thursday, February 22, 2018	#IANUDeterminado	9.1%	#1	
364	"Protector"	Friday, February 23, 2018	#IANUProtector	8.9%	#1	
365	"Sakripisyo" (Sacrifice)	Saturday, February 24, 2018	#IANUSakripisyo	10.0%	#1	
366	"Paalam" (Goodbye)	Monday, February 26, 2018	#IANUPaalam	9.2%	#1	
367	"Hinagpis" (Grief)	Tuesday, February 27, 2018	#IANUHinagpis	8.3%	#1	
368	"Kapatid" (Sister)	Wednesday, February 28, 2018	#IANUKapatid	8.0%	#1	
Average						

=== March 2018 ===
Episode		Original Air Date	Social Media Hashtag	AGB Nielsen NUTAM People		
Episode		Original Air Date	Social Media Hashtag	Rating	Timeslot Rank	Ref.
369	"Patibong" (Trap)	Thursday, March 1, 2018	#IANUPatibong	7.9%	#1	
370	"Kulong" (Imprisonment)	Friday, March 2, 2018	#IANUKulong	8.0%	#1	
371	"Pagdurusa" (Suffering)	Saturday, March 3, 2018	#IANUPagdurusa	8.0%	#1	
372	"Hirap" (Difficulty)	Monday, March 5, 2018	#IANUHirap	7.4%	#1	
373	"Ganti" (Over)	Tuesday, March 6, 2018	#IANUGanti	7.1%	#1	
374	"Nagkaambang Panganib" (Imminent Risk)	Wednesday, March 7, 2018	#IANUNakaambangPanganib	7.0%	#1	
375	"Trauma"	Thursday, March 8, 2018	#IANUTrauma	7.7%	#1	
376	"Maitim na Balak" (Dark Intentions)	Friday, March 9, 2018	#IANUMaitimNaBalak	7.5%	#1	
377	"Panganib" (Risk)	Saturday, March 10, 2018	#IANUPanganib	8.1%	#1	
378	"Huling Lunes" (Final Monday)	Monday, March 12, 2018	#IANUHulingLunes	7.6%	#1	
379	"Huling Martes" (Final Tuesday)	Tuesday, March 13, 2018	#IANUHulingMartes	7.7%	#1	
380	"Huling Miyerkules" (Final Wednesday)	Wednesday, March 14, 2018	#IANUHulingMiyerkules	7.7%	#1	
381	"Huling Huwebes" (Final Thursday)	Thursday, March 15, 2018	#IANUHulingHuwebes	7.8%	#1	
382	"Huling Biyernes" (Final Friday)	Friday, March 16, 2018	#IANUHulingBiyernes	8.6%	#1	
383	"Huling Paghaharap" (The Final Battle)	Saturday, March 17, 2018 in Finale Week	#IANUHulingPaghaharap	10.4%	#1	
Average						
