= StarStruck season 2 =

Season of a Philippine television reality show

StarStruck
- Season 2
- Title card 2004
- No. of episodes: 96

Release
- Original network: GMA Network
- Original release: October 11, 2004 – February 20, 2005

Season chronology
- ← Previous; Season 1 Next → Season 3

The second season of StarStruck, is a Philippine television reality talent competition show, was broadcast on GMA Network. Hosted by Dingdong Dantes with the StarStruck Kids host, Jolina Magdangal, it premiered on October 11, 2004. The council was composed of Joey de Leon, Christopher de Leon and Louie Ignacio. There were slight changes made in the Council, Joyce Bernal was replaced by Louie Ignacio. The season ended with 96 episodes on February 20, 2005, having Mike Tan and Ryza Cenon as the Ultimate Survivors.

The series is streaming online on YouTube.

== Overview ==
The second season of StarStruck was announced once again on GMA Network's variety program, SOP, where the hosts invited teenagers from 14 to 18 years old to audition for the upcoming season. Like its first season, much of the auditions were held at the GMA Network's headquarters and at SM Supermalls throughout the Philippines.

The show primer aired the untold secrets of the first season's final fourteen the life they had before and after StarStruck, and the changes StarStruck made into their lives.

The pilot episode was aired on October 11, 2004. With a new set of survivors and more rigid tests. The same rules were applied in selecting the Ultimate Survivors. StarStruck is shown only weekdays having Mondays to Thursdays will be tests and Fridays would be the elimination night. The show held its the Final Judgment on February 20, 2005 at the Araneta Coliseum.

== Selection process ==
In the second year of the reality-talent search, Out of thousands who auditioned nationwide, only the Top 100 was chosen for the first cut. From the Top 100, it was trimmed down to the Top 60, then from the Top 60 to the Top 30, and from the Top 30 to the final fourteen finalists.

The Final 14 underwent various workshops and training in order to develop their personalities, talents, and charisma. But, the twist is that every week, one or two hopefuls from the final fourteen may have to say goodbye until only four remain. Those who were eliminated were dubbed as StarStruck Avengers.

The Final 4 will vie for the coveted the Ultimate Survivors titles, the Ultimate Male Survivor and the Ultimate Female Survivor, both of them will received P1,000,000 pesos each plus and an exclusive management contract from GMA Network.

The Runners-up, both of them will received P250,000 each plus and an exclusive management contract from the network. The StarStruck Avengers (the losing contestants) also received an exclusive contract from the network.

== Hopefuls ==
When the Final 14 was chosen, they are assigned to different challenges every week that will hone their acting, singing, and dancing abilities. Every Friday, one is meant to leave the competition until there were just six others who are left. From survivor six, there will be two of them who will be eliminated and after the elimination of the two; the final four will be revealed.

The Final 4 will be battling with each other on the Final Judgment. People will choose who they want to win the competition by online voting and text voting. 30% of the result will come from the online and text votes and the remaining 70% is from the council.

=== Avengers Strike's Back Twist ===
This season was the first occurrence where a former eliminated contestant returned to the competition which was named The Avengers Strike's Back. The avengers competing with the remaining survivors are Jelaine Santos, Kevin Santos, Ailyn Luna, Ken Punzalan, Ana David, Chris Martin, Krizzy Jareño and CJ Muere.

=== Survivor Six Twist ===
CJ Muere was eliminated on December 24, 2004. But because of the Strike's Back, Benj Pacia was later replaced by him and returned to the contest through a major twist wherein an avengers will be given the chance to re-enter the contest by emerging with at least fourth-best in cumulative scores among the Survivor Six now consists of LJ Reyes, Megan Young, Ryza Cenon, Benj Pacia, Kirby de Jesus and Mike Tan.

CJ Muere emerged in the survivor six, and was reinstated while Benj Pacia was eliminated. Some viewers did not like this twist for it undermined the rules and regulations of the show. Although, the fans of CJ Muere and welcomed his return to the competition and proved to be worthy to be part of the elite final four. CJ Muere also got the highest Jollibee votes, thus he starred in a Jollibee Commercial.

Color key:

Male contestant
Female contestant
Finalist
Runner-up
Winner

Place	Contestant	Age	Hometown	Exit	Result
1	Mike Tan	17	Angono, Rizal	February 20, 2005	Ultimate Male Survivor
2	Ryza Cenon	17	Gapan, Nueva Ecija	February 20, 2005	Ultimate Female Survivor
3	CJ Muere	16	San Pablo, Laguna	February 20, 2005	First Prince
4	LJ Reyes	17	Quezon City	February 20, 2005	First Princess
5	Kirby de Jesus	16	Caloocan	January 21, 2005	Avenger
6	Megan Young	14	Olongapo, Zambales	January 21, 2005	Avenger
7	Benj Pacia	16	Angeles, Pampanga	January 14, 2005	Avenger
8	Krizzy Jareño	15	Metro Manila	December 17, 2004	Avenger
9	Chris Martin	16	Santo Tomas, Pampanga	December 10, 2004	Avenger
10	Ana David	14	San Fernando, Pampanga	December 6, 2004	Avenger
11	Ken Punzalan	15	Santo Tomas, Batangas	November 19, 2004	Avenger
12	Ailyn Luna	15	Rosario, Cavite	November 12, 2004	Avenger
13	Kevin Santos	16	Metro Manila	November 5, 2004	Avenger
14	Jelaine Santos	15	Quezon City	October 29, 2004	Avenger

== Weekly Artista Tests ==
Color key:

Contestant with the Pre-Recognation Awardee
Contestant was saved by the Public Vote and Council Vote
Contestant was in the Bottom Group
Contestant was Eliminated
Contestant was advanced to the competition and Grand Finals
Contestant with the Wild Card Winner
Contestant was in the Survivor 6 and Final 4
Contestant was the Runner-up
Contestant was the Winner

Week 1: The official Final 14 hopefuls have been chosen.

  - Eliminated Contestant: None

Contestant	Result
Ailyn Luna	Bottom 3
Ana David	Safe
Jelaine Santos	Safe
Krizzy Jareño	Safe
LJ Reyes	Pre-Recognation Awardee
Megan Young	Safe
Ryza Cenon	Safe

Contestant	Result
Benj Pacia	Safe
Chris Martin	Safe
CJ Muere	Safe
Ken Punzalan	Bottom 3
Kevin Santos	Bottom 3
Kirby de Jesus	Safe
Mike Tan	Safe

Week 2: The Final 14 hopefuls, are still complete.

Contestant	Result
Ailyn Luna	Safe
Ana David	Safe
Jelaine Santos	Eliminated
Krizzy Jareño	Bottom 3
LJ Reyes	Safe
Megan Young	Safe
Ryza Cenon	Safe

Contestant	Result
Benj Pacia	Pre-Recognation Awardee
Chris Martin	Safe
CJ Muere	Safe
Ken Punzalan	Bottom 3
Kevin Santos	Safe
Kirby de Jesus	Safe
Mike Tan	Safe

Week 3: The Final 13 hopefuls.

Contestant	Result
Ailyn Luna	Safe
Ana David	Bottom 3
Krizzy Jareño	Safe
LJ Reyes	Safe
Megan Young	Safe
Ryza Cenon	Pre-Recognation Awardee

Contestant	Result
Benj Pacia	Safe
Chris Martin	Bottom 3
CJ Muere	Safe
Ken Punzalan	Safe
Kevin Santos	Eliminated
Kirby de Jesus	Safe
Mike Tan	Safe

Week 4: The Final 12 hopefuls.

Contestant	Result
Ailyn Luna	Eliminated
Ana David	Safe
Krizzy Jareño	Safe
LJ Reyes	Safe
Megan Young	Safe
Ryza Cenon	Safe

Contestant	Result
Benj Pacia	Safe
Chris Martin	Safe
CJ Muere	Pre-Recognation Awardee
Ken Punzalan	Safe
Kirby de Jesus	Bottom 3
Mike Tan	Bottom 3

Week 5: The Final 11 hopefuls.

Contestant	Result
Ana David	Bottom 3
Krizzy Jareño	Safe
LJ Reyes	Safe
Megan Young	Safe
Ryza Cenon	Safe

Contestant	Result
Benj Pacia	Safe
Chris Martin	Safe
CJ Muere	Safe
Ken Punzalan	Eliminated
Kirby de Jesus	Bottom 3
Mike Tan	Pre-Recognation Awardee

Week 6: The Final 10 hopefuls.

  - Eliminated Contestant: None

Contestant	Result
Ana David	Bottom 3
Krizzy Jareño	Bottom 3
LJ Reyes	Safe
Megan Young	Safe
Ryza Cenon	Safe

Contestant	Result
Benj Pacia	Pre-Recognation Awardee
Chris Martin	Safe
CJ Muere	Bottom 3
Kirby de Jesus	Safe
Mike Tan	Safe

Week 7: The Final 10 hopefuls.

  - Eliminated Contestant: None

Contestant	Result
Ana David	Bottom 3
Krizzy Jareño	Safe
LJ Reyes	Safe
Megan Young	Safe
Ryza Cenon	Pre-Recognation Awardee

Contestant	Result
Benj Pacia	Bottom 3
Chris Martin	Safe
CJ Muere	Safe
Kirby de Jesus	Bottom 3
Mike Tan	Safe

Week 8: The Final 10 hopefuls, on Monday elimination night.

Contestant	Result
Ana David	Eliminated
Krizzy Jareño	Safe
LJ Reyes	Safe
Megan Young	Safe
Ryza Cenon	Safe

Contestant	Result
Benj Pacia	Bottom 3
Chris Martin	Safe
CJ Muere	Safe
Kirby de Jesus	Bottom 3
Mike Tan	Pre-Recognation Awardee

Week 8: The Final 9 hopefuls, on Friday elimination night.

Contestant	Result
Krizzy Jareño	Bottom 5
LJ Reyes	Bottom 5
Megan Young	Bottom 5
Ryza Cenon	Pre-Recognation Awardee

Contestant	Result
Benj Pacia	Safe
Chris Martin	Eliminated
CJ Muere	Safe
Kirby de Jesus	Safe
Mike Tan	Bottom 5

Week 9: The Final 8 hopefuls

Contestant	Result
Krizzy Jareño	Eliminated
LJ Reyes	Pre-Recognation Awardee
Megan Young	Safe
Ryza Cenon	Safe

Contestant	Result
Benj Pacia	Bottom 3
CJ Muere	Safe
Kirby de Jesus	Bottom 3
Mike Tan	Safe

Week 10: The Final 7 hopefuls.

  - Pre-Recognation Awardee Contestant: Not Awarded

Contestant	Result
LJ Reyes	Safe
Megan Young	Safe
Ryza Cenon	Safe

Contestant	Result
Benj Pacia	Safe
CJ Muere	Eliminated
Kirby de Jesus	Bottom 3
Mike Tan	Bottom 3

Week 11: The Survivor 6 hopefuls.

  - Pre-Recognation Awardee Contestant: None
  - Eliminated Contestant: None

Contestant	Result
LJ Reyes	Safe
Megan Young	Safe
Ryza Cenon	Bottom 3

Contestant	Result
Benj Pacia	Safe
Kirby de Jesus	Bottom 3
Mike Tan	Bottom 3

Week 12: The First week of The Avengers Strike's Back Twist.

  - Pre-Recognation Awardee Contestant: None
  - Eliminated Contestant: None
  - Avengers Strike's Back Twist

Contestant	Result
Ailyn Luna	Advanced
Ana David	Advanced
Jelaine Santos	Advanced
Krizzy Jareño	Advanced

Contestant	Result
Chris Martin	Advanced
CJ Muere	Advanced
Ken Punzalan	Advanced
Kevin Santos	Advanced

Week 13: The Second week of The Avengers Strike's Back Twist.

  - Pre-Recognation Awardee Contestant: Not Awarded
  - Survivor 6 Hopefuls

Contestant	Result
LJ Reyes	Bottom 6
Megan Young	Bottom 6
Ryza Cenon	Bottom 6

Contestant	Result
Benj Pacia	Eliminated
Kirby de Jesus	Bottom 6
Mike Tan	Bottom 6

  - Avengers Strike's Back Twist

Contestant	Result
Ailyn Luna	Eliminated
Ana David	Eliminated
Jelaine Santos	Eliminated
Krizzy Jareño	Eliminated

Contestant	Result
Chris Martin	Eliminated
CJ Muere	Strike's Back
Ken Punzalan	Eliminated
Kevin Santos	Eliminated

  - Survivor 6 Twist

Contestant	Result
LJ Reyes	Survivor 6
Megan Young	Survivor 6
Ryza Cenon	Survivor 6

Contestant	Result
CJ Muere	Wild Card
Kirby de Jesus	Survivor 6
Mike Tan	Survivor 6

Week 14: The Survivor 6 hopefuls.

  - Pre-Recognation Awardee Contestant: Not Awarded

Contestant	Result
LJ Reyes	Bottom 6
Megan Young	Bottom 6
Ryza Cenon	Bottom 6

Contestant	Result
CJ Muere	Bottom 6
Kirby de Jesus	Bottom 6
Mike Tan	Bottom 6

Week 15: The Survivor 6 hopefuls, The official Final 4 hopefuls have been chosen.

  - Pre-Recognation Awardee Contestant: Not Awarded

Contestant	Result
LJ Reyes	Final 4
Megan Young	Eliminated
Ryza Cenon	Final 4

Contestant	Result
CJ Muere	Final 4
Kirby de Jesus	Eliminated
Mike Tan	Final 4

Week 16-17: The Final 4 Homecoming

Contestant	Result
LJ Reyes	Advanced
Ryza Cenon	Advanced

Contestant	Result
CJ Muere	Advanced
Mike Tan	Advanced

Week 18: The Final Judgment, the Ultimate Survivors have been proclaimed.

Contestant	Result
LJ Reyes	First Princess
Ryza Cenon	Ultimate Female Survivor

Contestant	Result
CJ Muere	First Prince
Mike Tan	Ultimate Male Survivor

== Final Judgment ==
The winner was announced on a two-hour TV special dubbed as StarStruck: The Final Judgment was held live on February 20, 2005 at the Araneta Coliseum again, the venue was jam-packed of an estimated 12,000 inside and 3,000 outside fans.

The opening dance number, together with season's avengers, and they were joined by this final four and the graduates from the previous season. Hosted by Dingdong Dantes and Jolina Magdangal with the guest co-hosting on the event Raymond Gutierrez. The council was formed with Joey de Leon (dubbed as the Entertainment Guru), Christopher de Leon (multi-awarded actor), and Louie Ignacio (director) representing it.

The final four then performs their solo performances. The female survivors, LJ Reyes with Rainier Castillo from a dance number by a song of Aryanna’s Bop It performs a dance number with the Abstract dancers and Kids@Work, Ryza Cenon with Mark Herras a dance number by a song of Master P featuring Weebie Krazy’s Rock It performs a dance number with the Abstract dancers and Kids@Work and together with the Manoeuvres. Next the male survivors, CJ Muere with Yasmien Kurdi a dance number by a song of ?’s ? performs a dance number with the Abstract dancers and Kids@Work and Mike Tan with Jennylyn Mercado a dance number by a song of ?’s ? performs a dance number with the Abstract dancers and Kids@Work.

The avengers’ performance came in next, in a song and dance medley detailing the journey of the survivors from the audition process, the four International contenders and the elimination of the tenth avengers for a sing and dance number.

Announcement come, Ryza Cenon of Gapan, Nueva Ecija with a score of 92.34% is the Ultimate Female Survivor and Mike Tan of Angono, Rizal with a score of 90.58% is the Ultimate Male Survivor were proclaimed as the Ultimate Survivors, each of them received P1,000,000 pesos each plus and an exclusive management contract from GMA Network.

While, LJ Reyes of Quezon City with a score of 89.99% and CJ Muere of San Pablo, Laguna with a score of 88.96% were proclaimed as the Runners-up, each of them received P250,000 pesos each plus and an exclusive management contract from the network. The StarStruck Avengers (the losing contestants) also received an exclusive contract from the network. The Final Judgment gained 37.2% in ratings.

== Film Assignment ==
For their first Film Assignment, the final four Mike Tan, Ryza Cenon, CJ Muere and LJ Reyes with the avenger Kirby de Jesus for upcoming cast of the Philippine romantic comedy film, Lovestruck Dream. Believe. Fall In Love! directed by Louie Ignacio. They co-starred with Jolina Magdangal and the StarStruck alumna Mark Herras, Jennylyn Mercado, Rainier Castillo and Yasmien Kurdi.

== Signature dances ==
There are signature dances and songs made in each batch. With this batch, their signature dances and songs are:

- Chocolatte
- El Biro-Biro
- Don't You Just Know It
- Follow The Leader
- Bop It
- Rock It

== Elimination chart ==
Color key:

Male contestant
Female contestant
Pre-recognition Awardee
Safe
Bottom Group
Eliminated
Advanced
Wild Card
Final 4
Finalist
Runner-up
Winner

Results per public and council votes
Place	Contestant	Top 14 (Week 1-2)		Top 13 (Week 3)	Top 12 (Week 4)	Top 11 (Week 5)	Top 10 (Week 6-8)			Top 9 (Week 9)	Top 8 (Week 10)	Top 7 (Week 11)	Top 6 (Week 12-15)				Top 4 (Week 16-19)			
Place	Contestant	10/22/04 ^{1}	10/29/04	11/5/04	11/12/04	11/19/04	11/26/04 ^{2}	12/3/04 ^{3}	12/6/04	12/10/04	12/17/04	12/24/04	12/31/04 ^{4}	1/7/05 ^{5}	1/14/05 ^{6}	1/21/05 ^{7}	1/28/05 ^{8}	2/5/05	2/12/05	2/20/05 ^{9}
1–4	Mike Tan	Safe	Safe	Safe	Bottom 3	Pre-recognition Awardee	Safe	Safe	Pre-recognition Awardee	Bottom 5	Safe	Bottom 3	Bottom 3	Safe	Bottom 6	Bottom 6	Final 4	Advanced	Advanced	Ultimate Male Survivor
1–4	Ryza Cenon	Safe	Safe	Pre-recognition Awardee	Safe	Safe	Safe	Pre-recognition Awardee	Safe	Pre-recognition Awardee	Safe	Safe	Bottom 3	Safe	Bottom 6	Bottom 6	Final 4	Advanced	Advanced	Ultimate Female Survivor
1–4	CJ Muere	Safe	Safe	Safe	Pre-recognition Awardee	Safe	Bottom 3	Safe	Safe	Safe	Safe	Eliminated		Advanced	Wild Card	Bottom 6	Final 4	Advanced	Advanced	First Prince
1–4	LJ Reyes	Pre-recognition Awardee	Safe	Safe	Safe	Safe	Safe	Safe	Safe	Bottom 5	Pre-recognition Awardee	Safe	Safe	Safe	Bottom 6	Bottom 6	Final 4	Advanced	Advanced	First Princess
5–6	Kirby de Jesus	Safe	Safe	Safe	Bottom 3	Bottom 3	Safe	Bottom 3	Bottom 3	Safe	Bottom 3	Bottom 3	Bottom 3	Safe	Bottom 6	Bottom 6	Eliminated			Avenger
5–6	Megan Young	Safe	Safe	Safe	Safe	Safe	Safe	Safe	Safe	Bottom 5	Safe	Safe	Safe	Safe	Bottom 6	Bottom 6	Eliminated			Avenger
7	Benj Pacia	Safe	Pre-recognition Awardee	Safe	Safe	Safe	Pre-recognition Awardee	Bottom 3	Bottom 3	Safe	Bottom 3	Safe	Safe	Safe	Eliminated					Avenger
8	Krizzy Jareño	Safe	Bottom 3	Safe	Safe	Safe	Bottom 3	Safe	Safe	Bottom 5	Eliminated			Advanced	Eliminated					Avenger
9	Chris Martin	Safe	Safe	Bottom 3	Safe	Safe	Safe	Safe	Safe	Eliminated				Advanced	Eliminated					Avenger
10	Ana David	Safe	Safe	Bottom 3	Safe	Bottom 3	Bottom 3	Bottom 3	Eliminated					Advanced	Eliminated					Avenger
11	Ken Punzalan	Bottom 3	Bottom 3	Safe	Safe	Eliminated								Advanced	Eliminated					Avenger
12	Ailyn Luna	Bottom 3	Safe	Safe	Eliminated									Advanced	Eliminated					Avenger
13	Kevin Santos	Bottom 3	Safe	Eliminated										Advanced	Eliminated					Avenger
14	Jelaine Santos	Safe	Eliminated											Advanced	Eliminated					Avenger

=== Notes ===
1. It was a non-elimination week. The bottom group are Ailyn Luna, Ken Punzalan and Kevin Santos was safe for the elimination on October 22, 2004.
2. It was a non-elimination week. The bottom group are Ana David, CJ Muere and Krizzy Jareño was safe for the elimination on November 26, 2004.
3. It was a non-elimination week. The bottom group are Ana David, Benj Pacia and Kirby de Jesus was safe for the elimination on December 3, 2004.
4. It was a non-elimination week. The bottom group are Kirby de Jesus, Ryza Cenon and Mike Tan was safe for the elimination on December 31, 2004.
5. The avengers strikes back: Jelaine Santos, Kevin Santos, Ailyn Luna, Ken Punzalan, Ana David, Chris Martin, Krizzy Jareño. CJ Muere was eliminated on December 24, 2004. But because of the strike back, Benj Pacia was later replaced by him and returned to the contest through a major twist wherein an avenger (a losing contestant) will be given the chance to re-enter the contest by emerging with at least fourth-best in cumulative scores among the survivor six.
6. CJ Muere emerged in the final four, and was reinstated while Benj Pacia was eliminated.
7. It was a non-elimination week. The bottom group are the remaining survivor six, was safe for the elimination on January 21, 2005.
8. the final four was chosen on January 28, 2005. And the last avengers are Megan Young and Kirby de Jesus. The first called to eliminated is Megan Young and the second called is Kirby de Jesus.
9. In the final judgment night, Mike Tan and Ryza Cenon were proclaimed as the Ultimate Survivors.
