= Ang Manananggal sa Unit 23B =

- Theatrical release poster
- Directed by: Prime Cruz
- Written by: Jen Chuaunsu
- Starring: Ryza Cenon; Martin del Rosario; Cholo Barretto; Vangie Labalan
- Production company: The IdeaFirst Company
- Release dates: October 13, 2016 (QCinema); August 16, 2017 (Commercial release)
- Running time: 82 minutes
- Country: Philippines
- Language: Filipino

Ang Manananggal sa Unit 23B (lit. 'The Manananggal at Unit 23B') is a 2016 Filipino independent romantic horror film directed by Prime Cruz under The IdeaFirst Company. It stars Ryza Cenon, Martin del Rosario, Cholo Barretto, and Vangie Labalan.

== Synopsis ==
Jewel (Ryza Cenon) is a lonely woman secretly a manananggal who falls in love with Nico (Martin del Rosario), a heartbroken man who also has a low self-esteem like her. She is puzzled between allowing herself to love Nico or saving him from herself.

== Cast ==
- Ryza Cenon as Jewel
- Martin del Rosario as Nico
- Cholo Barretto
- Vangie Labalan

== Production ==
Ang Manananggal sa Unit 23B which had a genre described as "Romantic Gore" was directed by Prime Cruz and written by Jen Chuaunsu and was produced under The IdeaFirst Company.

Prime wanted to make a film revolving around the local folklore creature, the manananggal. Jen Chuaunsu said that the production team wanted to create a film where the mananaggal is the protagonist instead of the antagonist as usually portrayed in film. Chuausnu who made a research on the folklore creature said that the particular character in Manananggal was added with human characteristic in an effort to make the supernatural more relatable.

Sex scenes were shot for the Manananggal: the character of Cenon masturbating and sex between the characters of Cenon and Cholo Barretto. Cenon's portrayal in the film is considered as her first "mature" role and was initially hesitant to do the scenes. She considered the masturbation scene as easier to make since she was alone compared with her scene with Barretto. The two scenes were shot a day each and the production staff - the camera and lighting crew involved in the scenes were all women.

The makers of Manananggal weighed in the reception of those who watch the film at the QC Cinema International Film Festival and made edits and shot additional scenes before it was screened at the Pista ng Pelikulang Pilipino.

== Release ==
Manananggal had its first release at the 2016 QCinema International Film Festival which ran from October 13–22, 2016 as one of the official entries of the film festival. The film had its first commercial release on August 16, 2017, as one of the twelve official entries at the 2017 Pista ng Pelikulang Pilipino.

== Reception ==
Award / film festival	Category	Recipient(s)	Result
QCinema International Film Festival 2016	Best Director	Prime Cruz	Won
QCinema International Film Festival 2016	Best Supporting Actress	Vangie Labalan	Won
