= Mukha (TV series) =

2005 Philippine television drama series

- Also known as: Facade
- Genre: Drama
- Developed by: Don Michael Perez
- Written by: Kit Villanueva-Langit; Des Garbes-Severino; Luningning Interio-Ribay
- Directed by: Mac Alejandre
- Creative director: Roy Iglesias
- Starring: Ryza Cenon; LJ Reyes; JC de Vera
- Theme music composer: Vince de Jesus
- Opening theme: "Now and Forever" by Kyla
- Country of origin: Philippines
- Original language: Tagalog
- No. of episodes: 63

Production
- Executive producer: Camille Pengson
- Camera setup: Multiple-camera setup
- Running time: 30 minutes
- Production company: GMA Entertainment TV

Original release
- Network: GMA Network
- Release: March 14 – June 10, 2005

Mukha (transl. face / international title: Facade) is a 2005 Philippine television drama series broadcast by GMA Network. The series is the first installment of Now and Forever. Directed by Mac Alejandre, it stars Ryza Cenon, LJ Reyes and JC de Vera. It premiered on March 14, 2005. The series concluded on June 10, 2005, with a total of 63 episodes.

== Plot ==
Mae and Melody went to the same college. Mae struggled with pursuing her dreams, family drama, and love life issues. Melody suffered in the clutches of her cunning and abusive stepmother, Dulce. The woman was after the inheritance that her late father, Miguel, had left her. Tragedy struck as a chemical explosion occurred in the school laboratory with both Mae and Melody inside. People thought that Mae died, but she survived with severe burns in her face. Meanwhile, Melody had gone missing, leaving Dulce no way of getting her inheritance since she needed her personal appearance to sign documents in front of a lawyer. In desperation, Dulce offered Mae to help her undergo a reconstructive surgery in exchange for using Melody's face. Mae accepted it, believing she could get back the life she thought she had lost. She assumed Melody's identity, not knowing the peril she was getting herself into. As Miguel's evil twin, Manuel, entered the picture and connived with Dulce, Mae found herself in a life-and-death situation. How long could she live under the facade of Melody's life? Would the real Melody come back?

== Cast and characters ==
Cast

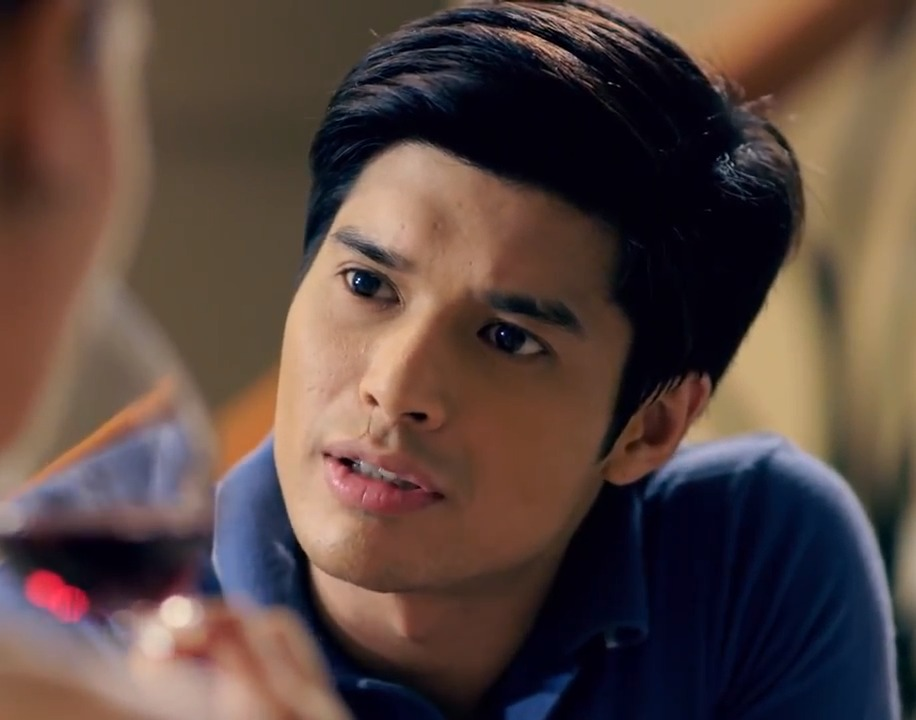
JC de Vera

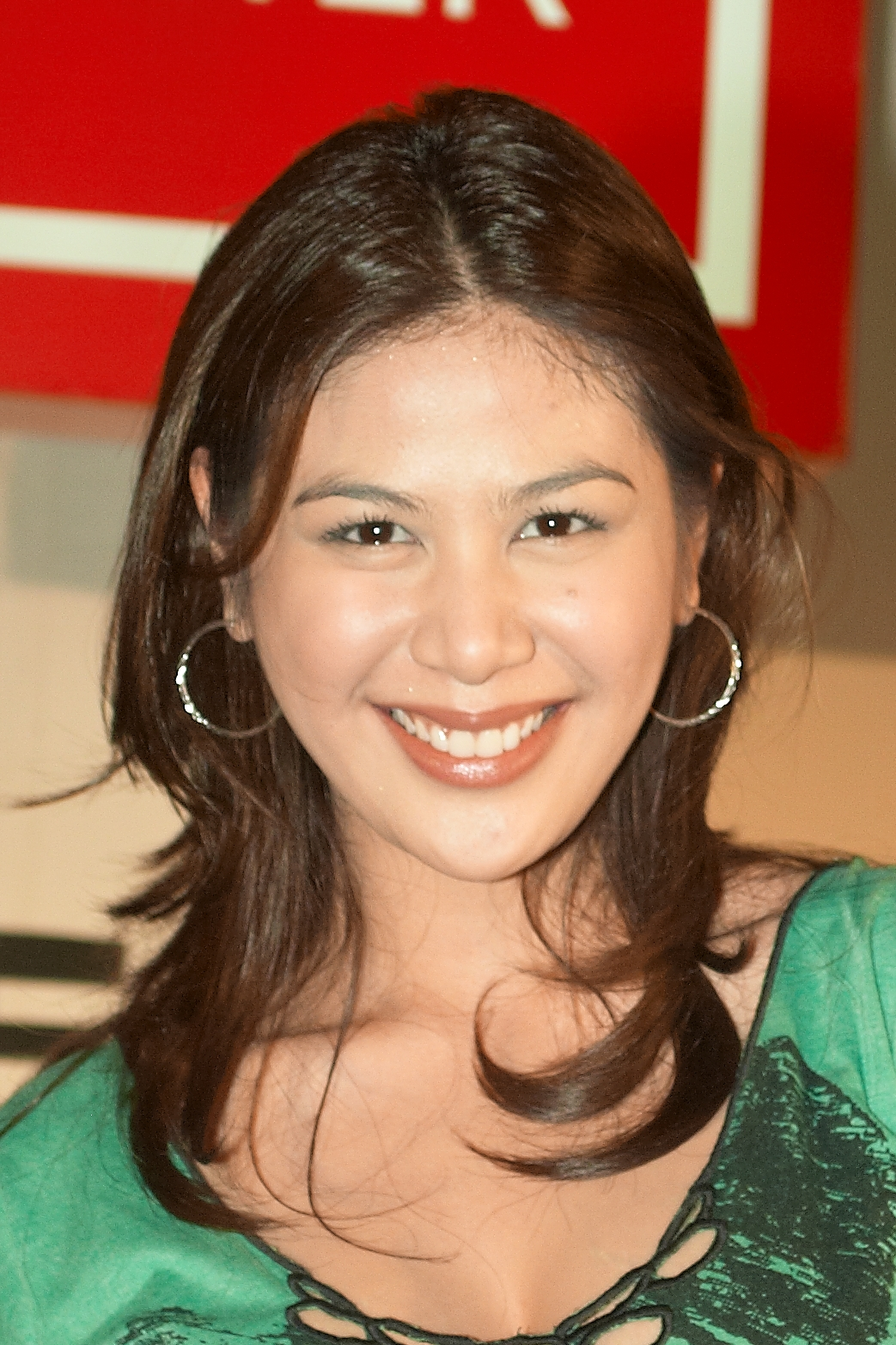
Valerie Concepcion

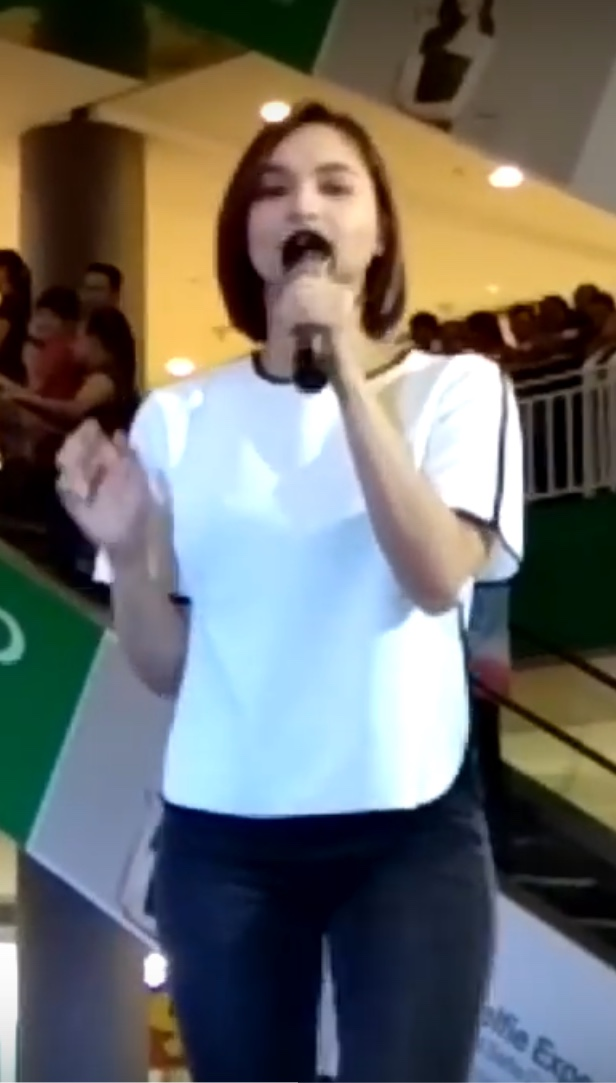
Ryza Cenon

Lead cast

- Ryza Cenon as Mae
- LJ Reyes as Melody
- Valerie Concepcion as Karen
- CJ Muere as Vince
- JC de Vera as William
- Mike Tan as Paolo

Supporting cast

- Princess Punzalan as Dulce
- Amy Austria as Fatima
- Joel Torre as Guido
- Alicia Alonzo as Juanita
- Glenda Garcia as Vivian
- Chinggoy Alonzo as Miguel / Manuel
- Susan Africa as Leonor
- Czarina de Leon as Georgina
- Carlo Maceda as Edward

== Accolades ==
Accolades received by Mukha
| Year | Award | Category | Recipient | Result | Ref. |
|---|---|---|---|---|---|
| 2005 | 19th PMPC Star Awards for Television | Best Daytime Drama Series | Mukha | Won | |
