= Ika-6 na Utos =

Philippine television drama series

- Title card
- Also known as: A Woman Scorned
- Genre: Drama
- Created by: Richard "Dode" Cruz; R.J. Nuevas
- Written by: Richard "Dode" Cruz; Geng Delgado; Luningning Ribay
- Directed by: Laurice Guillen
- Creative director: Roy Iglesias
- Starring: Sunshine Dizon; Gabby Concepcion; Ryza Cenon
- Theme music composer: Len Calvo
- Opening theme: "Sa Lahat ng Iba" by Aicelle Santos
- Country of origin: Philippines
- Original language: Tagalog
- No. of episodes: 383 (list of episodes)

Production
- Executive producer: Arlene D. Pilapil
- Producer: Mark Andrew Valdez
- Production locations: Quezon City, Philippines; Cebu City, Philippines; Batangas, Philippines
- Cinematography: Jay Abello
- Editors: Neil Stephen Cervantes; Ryan Balatbat
- Camera setup: Multiple-camera setup
- Running time: 24–32 minutes
- Production company: GMA Entertainment TV

Original release
- Network: GMA Network
- Release: December 5, 2016 – March 17, 2018

Ika-6 na Utos (pronounced as ika-anim na utos / transl. sixth commandment / international title: A Woman Scorned) is a Philippine television drama series broadcast by GMA Network. Directed by Laurice Guillen, it stars Sunshine Dizon, Gabby Concepcion and Ryza Cenon. It premiered on December 5, 2016 on the network's Afternoon Prime line up. On April 1, 2017, it joined the network's Sabado Star Power sa Hapon line up. The series concluded on March 17, 2018, with a total of 383 episodes.

The series is streaming online on YouTube.

== Premise ==
Rome and Emma have problems and when issues arise, their marriage is in jeopardy. Rome eventually meets Georgia, who will become his mistress.

== Cast and characters ==
Cast

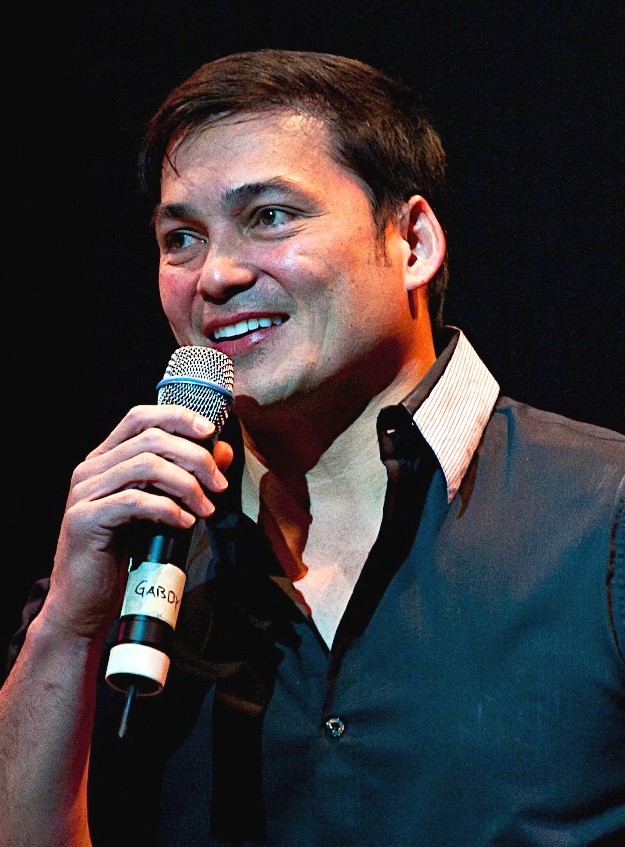
Gabby Concepcion

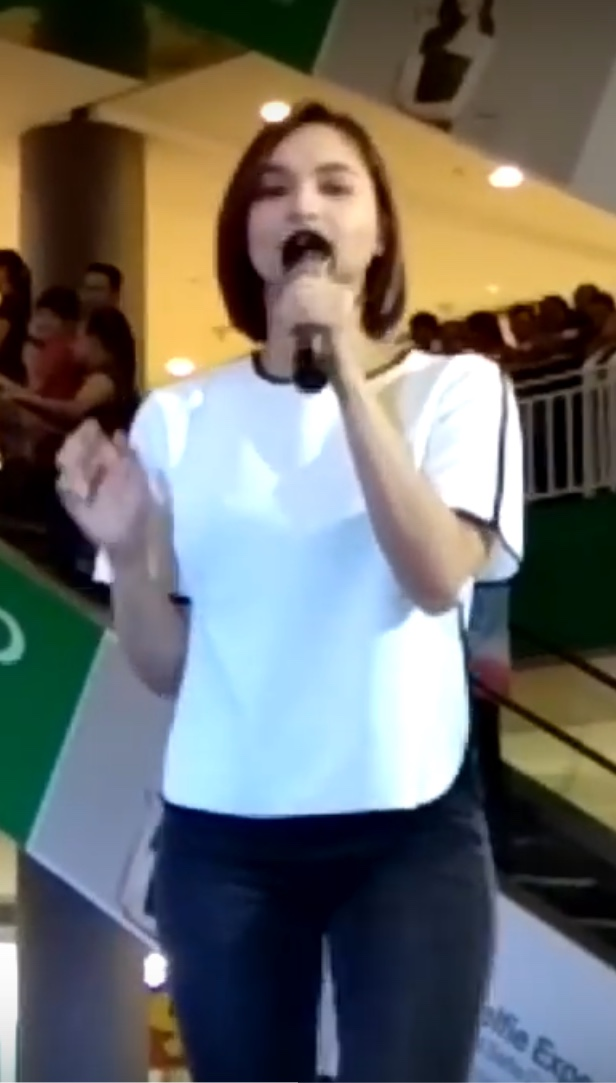
Ryza Cenon

Lead cast

- Sunshine Dizon as Emma Doqueza de Jesus-Fuentabella
- Gabby Concepcion as Jerome "Rome" Fuentabella / Jordan "Boss J" Francisco
- Ryza Cenon as Georgia "Adyang" Ferrer / Athena Francisco

Supporting cast

- Mike Tan as Angelo Trinidad
- Rich Asuncion as Flora "Flor" Trinidad
- Daria Ramirez as Lourdes Doqueza-de Jesus
- Carmen Soriano as Margarita vda. de Fuentabella
- Marco Alcaraz as Chandler Vasquez
- Mel Martinez as Zeny
- Arianne Bautista as Anselma "Selma" Del Rosario

Recurring cast

- Zach Briz as younger Austin
- Odette Khan as Loleng / Consuelo Domingo vda. de Guidotti
- Marife Necesito as Vicky
- Ollie Espino as Mando
- Rosemarie Sarita as Mildred Ferrer
- Eunice Lagusad as Becca
- Angelica Ulip as Sydney Ferrer Fuentabella / Milan de Jesus Fuentabella
- Cai Cortez as Charlotte Amalie "Char" Ledesma
- Pen Medina as Antonio “Noel” de Jesus
- Jacob Briz as Austin de Jesus Fuentabella
- Angelika Dela Cruz as Geneva "Gengen" Ferrer-Takahashi

Guest cast

- Elijah Alejo as younger Emma
- Karel Marquez as Lara Salcedo-Fuentabella
- Lito Legaspi as Allan
- Toby Alejar as Orlando
- Anna Marin as Anita
- Marcus Madrigal as Dave
- Sheila Marie Rodriguez as Cynthia
- Allan Paule as Danilo
- Luane Dy as a television host
- Aprilyn Gustillo as Grace
- Zoren Legaspi as Lyon Muller
- Chynna Ortaleza as Maui Alcaraz
- Leanne Bautista as Chelsea Muller
- Lharby Policarpio as Morgan
- Vince Gamad as Darwin
- Elle Ramirez as Kenya
- Marnie Lapuz as Chona
- Bryan Benedict as Nato
- Ranty Portento as Brian Santiago
- Izzy Trazona-Aragon as Alberta Alcaraz-Muller

== Production ==
Principal photography commenced on November 10, 2016. Filming concluded in March 2018.

== Ratings ==
According to AGB Nielsen Philippines' Nationwide Urban Television Audience Measurement, the pilot episode of Ika-6 na Utos earned an 11.9% rating. The final episode scored a 10.7% rating.

== Accolades ==
Accolades received by Ika-6 na Utos
Year	Award	Category	Recipient	Result	Ref.
2017	7th OFW Gawad Parangal	Best Actress	Sunshine Dizon	Won	
2017	7th OFW Gawad Parangal	Best Actor	Gabby Concepcion	Won	
2017	7th OFW Gawad Parangal	Best Supporting Actress	Ryza Cenon	Won	
2017	Gawad Amerika Awards	Most Outstanding Filipino Actress in TV	Sunshine Dizon	Won	
2017	31st PMPC Star Awards for Television	Best Daytime Drama Series	Ika-6 na Utos	Nominated	
2017	31st PMPC Star Awards for Television	Best Drama Actor	Gabby Concepcion	Nominated	
2017	31st PMPC Star Awards for Television	Best Drama Actress	Sunshine Dizon	Nominated	
2017	31st PMPC Star Awards for Television	Best Child Performer	Angelica Ulip	Nominated	
2017	7th EdukCircle Awards	Best Actor (TV series)	Gabby Concepcion	Won	
2017	7th EdukCircle Awards	Best Actress (TV series)	Sunshine Dizon	Nominated	
2017	7th EdukCircle Awards	Best Supporting Actor	Mike Tan	Nominated	
2017	7th EdukCircle Awards	Best Supporting Actress	Angelika dela Cruz Ryza Cenon	Nominated	
2017	12th Seoul International Awards	Asian Star Prize	Gabby Concepcion	Won	
2018	49th Box Office Entertainment Awards	TV Actor of the Year	Gabby Concepcion	Won	
2018	49th Box Office Entertainment Awards	TV Supporting Actress of the Year	Ryza Cenon	Won	
2018	1st Asian Academy Creative Awards	Best Telenovela/Soap (National)	Ika-6 na Utos	Won	
