= Now and Forever (TV series) =

Philippine television series

- Genre: Drama
- Created by: Don Michael Perez
- Written by: Kit Villanueva-Langit; Des Garbes-Severino; Luningning Interio-Ribay
- Directed by: Mac Alejandre
- Creative director: Roy Iglesias
- Theme music composer: Vince de Jesus
- Opening theme: "Now and Forever" by Kyla
- Country of origin: Philippines
- Original language: Tagalog
- No. of seasons: 7
- No. of episodes: 441

Production
- Executive producer: Camille Pengson
- Camera setup: Multiple-camera setup
- Running time: 30 minutes
- Production company: GMA Entertainment TV

Original release
- Network: GMA Network
- Release: March 14, 2005 – November 24, 2006

Now and Forever is a Philippine television drama series broadcast by GMA Network. It premiered on March 14, 2005 on the network's Dramarama sa Hapon line up with Mukha as the first instalment. The series concluded on November 24, 2006 with Dangal as the seventh and final installment.

== Seasons ==
- Mukha (March 14, 2005 – June 10, 2005)
- Ganti (June 13, 2005 – October 21, 2005)
- Agos (October 24, 2005 – January 6, 2006)
- Tinig (January 9, 2006 – April 12, 2006)
- Duyan (April 17, 2006 – July 21, 2006)
- Linlang (July 24, 2006 – September 22, 2006)
- Dangal (September 25, 2006 – November 24, 2006)

== Accolades ==
Accolades received by Now and Forever
Year	Award	Category	Recipient	Result	Ref.
2005	19th PMPC Star Awards for Television	Best Daytime Drama Series	Mukha	Won	
2006	20th PMPC Star Awards for Television	Best Daytime Drama Series	Tinig	Won	
