= Mike Tan =

Filipino actor (born 1986)

- Born: Jan Michael Silverio Tan; December 31, 1986 (age 39); Angono, Rizal, Philippines
- Education: Arellano University
- Occupations: Actor, dancer, model
- Years active: 2004–present
- Agent: Sparkle GMA Artist Center (2004–present)
- Height: 1.79 m (5 ft 10 in)
- Children: 2

Jan Michael Silverio Tan (born December 31, 1986), is a Filipino actor, dancer, and model. He became famous after winning in the second batch of the reality show StarStruck aired on GMA Network. He is currently an exclusive talent of GMA Network, Sparkle GMA Artist Center and GMA Pictures.

== Personal life ==
Tan is of Chinese descent. He is the last born of three children. He was born in Mandaluyong City and grew up there. He was baptized on July 31, 2016, as a Born Again Christian.

== Career ==
He played the role of Rick in the installment of Sine Novela Maging Akin Ka Lamang aired on GMA Network. Also, he had a special appearance on GMA Telebabad shows Babangon Ako't Dudurugin Kita which is the last program on GMA Network that he appeared.

There have been rumors of Mike transferring to ABS-CBN, but he has confirmed in a 2009 interview that he will remain with GMA. He also had his first religious television movie "Tanikala: Ang Ikalawang Libro" with co-star and former StarStruck Alumni Sheena Halili, and co-produced with CBN Asia, Inc., which was recently shown on GMA 7 during Holy Week 2010.

He recently appeared into a remake of Trudis Liit a final special offering of Sine Novela drama anthology where he played one of the series regular. Then he joined the cast of Captain Barbell: Ang Pagbabalik the sequel of 2006 series. Mike starred again into the upcoming TV series Kung Aagawin Mo ang Langit opposite Carla Abellana as the show's leading man. After the show's success, he starred in his first prime time series as part of the main cast, Legacy with Heart Evangelista, Lovi Poe, Alessandra de Rossi, Geoff Eigenmann and Sid Lucero. Right after Legacy, Mike came back in daytime soap via Faithfully as the lead man of Maxene Magalona.

== Filmography ==
=== Television ===
Year	Title	Role
2004–2005	StarStruck (season 2)	Himself
2005	Baywalk	Various
2005	Love to Love Season 7: Love Ko Urok	JD
2005	Now and Forever: Mukha	Paolo
2005–2010	SOP Rules	Himself / Performer
2005–2006	Sugo	Peping
2005–2006	SOP Gigsters	Himself / Co-host
2006	Love to Love Season 8: Stuck in Love	Engelbert
2006	I Luv NY	Tero
2007–2008	Marimar	Choi
2008	Sine Novela: Maging Akin Ka Lamang	Rick Rivera
2008	Babangon Ako't Dudurugin Kita	Mario
2008	Dear Friend	Various role
2009	Sine Novela : Dapat Ka Bang Mahalin?	Bong Ramos
2009	Rosalinda	Rico
2010	Daisy Siete: Bebe and Me	Daniel Tan
2010	Love Bug Presents: The Last Romance	Dado
2010	Sine Novela: Trudis Liit	Migs Ocampo
2011	Captain Barbell: Ang Pagbabalik	Teban / Anino
2011–2012	Kung Aagawin Mo ang Langit	Jonas Alejandro
2011	Spooky Nights: Singil	JR
2011	Spooky Nights: Kadugo	Ronnie
2012	Legacy	Arturo "Thirdy" San Jose
2012	Faithfully	Perry Escanio
2012	Tweets for My Sweet	Marco
2013	Party Pilipinas	Himself / Performer
2013	Magpakailanman	Nil Nolado
2013	Mga Basang Sisiw	Gregorio "Rigor" Manalastas
2014	Kambal Sirena	Jun
2014	Dading	Lexi's boyfriend
2015	Pari 'Koy	Dindo Altamira
2015	Magpakailanman: PO2 Ephraim Mejia Story	Macoy
2015	The Rich Man's Daughter	Paul Tanchingco
2015	Alamat: Juan Tamad	Juan Tamad (voice)
2015	Magpakailanman: 8Gay Pride	Rebecca
2015	My Faithful Husband	Brad
2016	Karelasyon	Daniel
2016	Dear Uge: Ang Krisis ng Dalawang Misis	Joselito
2016	The Millionaire's Wife	Ivan Meneses
2016–2017	Ika-6 na Utos	Angelo Trinidad
2017	Dear Uge: Kwentong Kutsero	Ino
2017	Tadhana: Hulog ng Langit	Manny
2017	Daig Kayo ng Lola Ko: Si Genna at ang Gintong Itlog	Fredo
2017	Stories for the Soul: Hanggang Saan, Hanggang Kailan?	Ramon
2018	Dear Uge: Kabit-sabit	Tomas
2018	Hindi Ko Kayang Iwan Ka	Marco Angeles
2018	Pamilya Roces	Young Rodolfo
2018	Magpakailanman: The Haunted Wife	Marvin
2019	Kara Mia	Iswal / Wally
2019	Wagas: Throwback Pag-Ibig	Ryan
2021	Nagbabagang Luha	Aidan "Bien" De Dios
2022	Artikulo 247	Julian Pineda
2023	The Seed of Love	Robert Nelson "Bobby" Jurado III
2024	Love. Die. Repeat.	Elton Villaforte
2024	Widows' War	Atty. Iñigo Morales / Antonio Berenguela
2025	Lolong	
2025	Mommy Dearest	Altaire
2025	Cruz vs Cruz	
2026	House of Lies	Paolo Torrecampo
TBA	My Daddy Long Legs	TBA

=== Film ===
Year	Title	Role
2005	Lovestruck	Jason
2006	Puso 3	
2006	Manay Po	Marky
2006	Barang	
2007	Batanes: Sa Dulo ng Walang Hanggan	Noel
2008	Manay Po 2: Overload	Marky
2009	Marino	
2009	Hellphone	
2010	Marino: Call of the Sea	
2015	No Boyfriend Since Birth	Paolo

== Awards ==
Year	Award	Category	Nominated work	Result
2015	29th PMPC Star Awards for Television	Best Supporting Actor	The Rich Man's Daughter	Nominated

Awards and achievements
Preceded by Mark Herras	StarStruck; 2004 (season 2)	Succeeded by Marky Cielo
