= Dingdong Dantes filmography =

- Film: 43
- Television: 29
- Hosting: 30

The following is a list of performance by Filipino actor Dingdong Dantes in the film and television industry.

== Filmography ==
=== Film ===
| Year | Title | Role |
|---|---|---|
| 1987 | Forward March | Small Boy |
| 1992 | Takbo Talon Tili | German |
| 1993 | Makati Avenue Office Girls | Marco |
| 1993 | Edgardo Gang: Santa Rosa Daang | Ben Santa Rosa |
| 1994 | Hindi Magbabago | Ritchie |
| 1994 | Shake, Rattle & Roll V | Elmer |
| 1998 | I'm Sorry, My Love | Butch |
| 1999 | Honey, My Love, So Sweet | Paco |
| 1999 | Kiss Mo 'Ko | Aaron Vincent Nakpil |
| 2002 | Akala Mo | Eric |
| 2002 | Magkapatid | Mike |
| 2003 | Pangarap Ko ang Ibigin Ka | Kevin |
| 2003 | Malikmata | Alvin |
| 2004 | Annie B. | Fernando |
| 2004 | Spirit of the Glass | Choppy |
| 2005 | Bahay ni Lola 2 | Rupert |
| 2005 | Mulawin: The Movie | Ybrahim |
| 2005 | Moments of Love | Marco |
| 2006 | Eternity | Crisanto |
| 2007 | Resiklo | Angelo |
| 2008 | One True Love | Miguel "Migs" Mijares |
| 2009 | Kimmy Dora: Kambal sa Kiyeme | Johnson |
| 2010 | You to Me Are Everything | Raphael Benítez |
| 2010 | Noy | Himself/Cameo |
| 2011 | Tween Academy: Class of 2012 | Cameo |
| 2011 | Segunda Mano | Ivan Gálvez |
| 2012 | Kimmy Dora and The Temple of Kiyeme | Johnson |
| 2012 | Boy Pick-Up: The Movie | Cameo |
| 2012 | Tiktik: The Aswang Chronicles | Makoy |
| 2012 | One More Try | Edward |
| 2013 | Dance of the Steel Bars | Inmate |
| 2013 | She's the One | Wacky Delos Reyes |
| 2013 | Kimmy Dora: Ang Kiyemeng Prequel | Johnson |
| 2014 | Kubot: The Aswang Chronicles 2 | Makoy |
| 2016 | The Unmarried Wife | Geoff Victorio |
| 2017 | Seven Sundays | Bryan Bonifacio |
| 2018 | Sid & Aya: Not a Love Story | Sid |
| 2018 | Fantastica | Dong Nam |
| 2019 | Family History | Ronaldo Reyes |
| 2021 | A Hard Day | Detective Edmund Villon |
| 2023 | Rewind | John Nuñez |
| 2023 | Firefly | Antonino "Tonton" Alvaro (Note: Special participation role of an adult version of the film's main child protagonist) |
| 2025 | Only We Know | Ryan Sliva |
| 2026 | Remember | Joseph |

=== Television ===
==== Television series ====
| Year | Title | Role | Notes | Ref. |
|---|---|---|---|---|
| 1996–2002 | Anna Karenina | Brix | Supporting role | |
| 2001–2003 | Sana ay Ikaw na Nga | Carlos Miguel Altamonte | Leading role with Tanya Garcia | |
| 2003–2004 | Twin Hearts | Adrian Asuncion | Leading role with Tanya Garcia | |
| 2005 | Encantadia | Ybrahim / Ybarro | Main cast | |
| 2005–2006 | Etheria: Ang Ikalimang Kaharian ng Encantadia | Ybrahim / Ybarro / Alexus | Main cast | |
| 2006 | Encantadia: Pag-ibig Hanggang Wakas | Haring Ybrahim / Ybarro | Main cast | |
| 2006–2007 | Atlantika | Aquano | Leading role with Iza Calzado | |
| 2007–2008 | Marimar | Sergio Santibañez | Leading role with Marian Rivera | |
| 2008 | Dyesebel | Fredo Legaspi | Leading role with Marian Rivera | |
| 2009 | Ang Babaeng Hinugot sa Aking Tadyang | Homer Alcaraz | Leading role with Marian Rivera | |
| 2009 | Stairway to Heaven | Pocholo "Cholo" Fuentebella | Leading role with Rhian Ramos | |
| 2010 | Diva | Himself | Cameo role | |
| 2010 | Endless Love | Johnny Dizon | Leading role with Marian Rivera | |
| 2011 | I ♥ You, Pare! | Kenneth Castillo | Leading role with Regine Velasquez/Iza Calzado | |
| 2012 | Amaya | Ferdinand Magellan | Cameo role | |
| 2012 | My Beloved | Benjamin "Benjie" Castor / Arlan | Leading role with Marian Rivera | |
| 2012–2013 | Pahiram ng Sandali | Alex Santiago | Leading role with Lorna Tolentino, & Max Collins | |
| 2013 | Genesis | Isaak Macalintal | Leading role with Rhian Ramos | |
| 2014 | Ang Dalawang Mrs. Real | Juan Antonio "Anthony" V. Real III | Leading role with Maricel Soriano, & Lovi Poe | |
| 2015 | Pari 'Koy | Father Jericho "Kokoy" Evangelista | Leading role with David Remo | |
| 2015 | Yagit | Father Jericho "Kokoy" Evangelista | Cameo role; Crossover character from Pari 'Koy | |
| 2016 | Poor Señorita | Rafael Buenaventura | Special Participation | |
| 2016 | Encantadia | Prinsipe Raquim | Special Participation with real-life wife, Marian Rivera. originally by Richard Gomez | |
| 2016–2017 | Alyas Robin Hood | Jose Paolo "Pepe" De Jesus / Crisostomo "Cris" Bonifacio / Alyas Robin Hood | Leading role with Megan Young, Solenn Heussaff and Andrea Torres | |
| 2018–2019 | Cain at Abel | Daniel Anthony Larrazabal | Leading role with Dennis Trillo, Sanya Lopez and Solenn Heussaff | |
| 2020 | Descendants of the Sun | Capt. Lucas Manalo (a.k.a. Big Boss) | Leading role with Jennylyn Mercado | |
| 2023 | Royal Blood | Napoleon "Napoy" Terrazo-Royales | Leading role | |
| 2025 | Lilet Matias: Attorney-at-Law | Pres. Frederico Macalintal | Special participation | |
| 2026–present | The Master Cutter | Anthony "Atoy" Padua | Main cast | |
| 2026 | Sun Chaser | Necrofrost (voice) | Supporting role | |
| TBA | Behind Close Doors | | Special participation | |

==== Television shows ====
| Year | Title | Role | Ref. |
|---|---|---|---|
| 1997–1999 | T.G.I.S. | Iñaki Torres | |
| 1997–2010 | SOP | Himself / Co-host / Performer | |
| 2003–2004 | StarStruck | Himself / Host | |
| 2004–2005 | StarStruck Season 2 | Himself / Host | |
| 2004–2006 | Wag Kukurap | Himself / Host | |
| 2005–2006 | StarStruck: The Nationwide Invasion | Himself / Host | |
| 2006–2007 | StarStruck: The Next Level | Himself / Host | |
| 2009–2010 | StarStruck V: The Worldwide Invasion | Himself / Host | |
| 2009–2010; 2022–present | Family Feud | Himself / Host | |
| 2010–13 | Party Pilipinas | Himself / Co-host / Performer | |
| 2011 | Mind Master | Himself / Host | |
| 2011 | Protégé: The Battle for the Big Break | Himself / Host | |
| 2012 | Protégé: The Battle for the Big Artista Break | Himself / Host | |
| 2015 | StarStruck VI | Himself / Host | |
| 2015–2016; 2018–2019 | Sunday PinaSaya | Himself / Regular guest (later a co-host and performer) | (Note: Attributed to multiple references:) |
| 2017 | Case Solved | Himself / Host | |
| 2018–present | Amazing Earth | Himself / Host | |
| 2019 | StarStruck VII | Himself / Host | |
| 2020; 2023; 2024; 2025 | All-Out Sundays | Himself / Guest / Performer | |
| 2022; 2024 | Jose & Maria's Bonggang Villa | Jose | |
| 2023 | The Voice Generations | Himself / Host | |
| 2024–present | The Voice Kids | Himself / Host | |

==== Drama anthologies ====
| Year | Title | Role | Episode | Ref. |
|---|---|---|---|---|
| 1998 | TEXT (The Extreme Team) | Lance | | |
| 2000 | GMA Mini-Series | Gerald | Tuwing Kapiling Ka | |
| 2005 | Kakabaka-Boo! | | | |
| 2007 | Magic Kamison | Rudy | Little Big Rufo | |
| 2011 | Spooky Nights Presents | Bongbong | The Mommy Returns: Ang Mama Kong Mamaw | |
| 2011 | Spooky Nights Presents | Franco | Da Mami | |
| 2011 | Spooky Nights Presents | Alfonso | Bampirella | |
| 2016 | Magpakailanman | Rev. Ricardo Manlapaz / Boy Bonus | The Rev. Ricardo Manlapaz Story: Ang Kriminal na Binuhay ng Diyos | |
| 2022 | I Can See You | Nate / Michael | AlterNate | |

==== TV specials ====
| Year | Title | Role | Notes | Ref. |
|---|---|---|---|---|
| 1998 | T.G.I. X-Mas | Iñaki Torres | T.G.I.S. Christmas TV special | |
| 2000 | Binibining Pilipinas 2000 | Himself / Host | Host with Ralion Alonso and KC Montero | |
| 2001 | Binibining Pilipinas 2001 | Himself / Host | Host with David Bunevacz, Ruffa Gutierrez and China Cojuangco | |
| 2004 | Binibining Pilipinas 2004 | Himself / Host | Host with Ariel Rivera and Miriam Quiambao | |
| 2006 | Binibining Pilipinas 2006 | Himself / Host | Host with Dennis Trillo and Pia Guanio | |
| 2008 | MariMar: Isang Pasasalamat | Sergio Santibañez | MariMar farewell special | |
| 2009 | Dantes Peak | Himself / Host / Performer | His 29th birthday celebration special | |
| 2010 | GMA @ 60: The Heart of Television | Himself / Host / Performer | GMA Network 60th anniversary special | |
| 2011 | Report Card: Antas Ng Edukasyon Sa Pilipinas | Himself / Host | GMA News and Public Affairs documentary special | |
| 2011 | Kwentong Dabarkads (30 Dekada ng Eat Bulaga!) | Himself / Host | Eat Bulaga! documentary special | |
| 2015 | 2°: Panahon Na | Himself / Host | GMA News and Public Affairs climate change special | |
| 2017 | Selda 1430 | Argel Corpuz | APT Entertainment holy week special. (aired im Black Saturday) | |
| 2025 | Beyond 75: The GMA 75th Anniversary Special | Himself / Host / Performer | GMA Network 75th anniversary special | |

== Discography ==
=== Albums ===
| Year | Title | Record label | Certifications |
|---|---|---|---|
| 2009 | The Dingdong Dantes Experience | Universal Records | Platinum Award |
