= List of awards and nominations received by Dingdong Dantes =

Dingdong Dantes awards and nominations
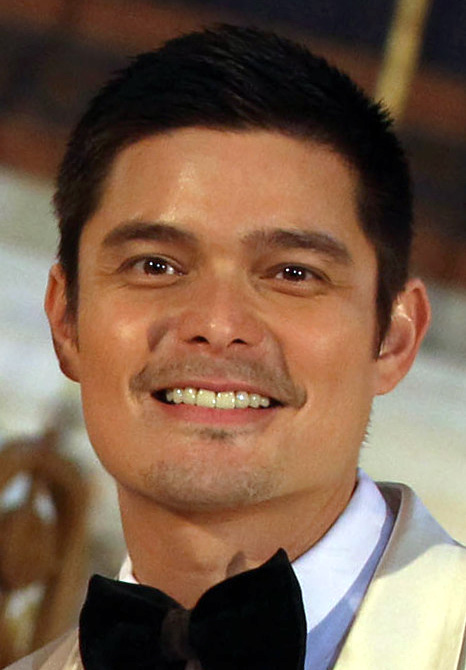
- Dantes in July 2008
Awards and nominations
Award	Wins	Nominations

Totals (Note: Certain award groups do not simply award one winner. They acknowledge several different recipients, have runners-up, and have third place. Since this is a specific recognition and is different from losing an award, runner-up mentions are considered wins in this award tally. For simplification and to avoid errors, each award in this list has been presumed to have had a prior nomination.)
- Wins: 33
- Nominations: 45

Filipino actor Dingdong Dantes has received several awards and nominations throughout his career in the entertainment industry. He is known for his acting versatility and played dramatic and fantasy-action roles in movies and television. His accolades include 11 times Box Office Entertainment Awards, 5 times PMPC Star Awards for Television, 3 times EdukCircle Awards, 2 times FAMAS Award, 2 times EDDYS Awards, 2 times Metro Manila Film Festival for Best Actor, 1 time Manila International Film Festival for Best Actor, a Seoul International Drama Awards Asian Star Prize, an Asian Academy Creative Awards for Best Entertainment Host, a Nickeledon Kids Choice Awards, a Gawad Pasado Award and a Gawad Tanglaw Award and a PMPC Star Awards for Movie including nominations from Gawad Urian Award, Golden Screen Awards for Movie, Luna Award and an Asian Television Awards nomination.

Dantes first acting debut in television was in the youth oriented show T.G.I.S. playing one of the main characters as Iñaki Torres in 1997. He acted opposite Tanya Garcia in drama series Sana ay Ikaw na Nga (2001) and Twin Hearts (2003). He gained further recognition in the fantasy-action series Encantadia (2005) and Atlantika (2006).

He solidified his place as the "Kapuso Primetime King" when he was paired with his wife Marian Rivera in Marimar (2007), and they continued to work in Dyesebel (2008), Ang Babaeng Hinugot sa Aking Tadyang (2009), Endless Love (2010) and My Beloved (2012) which gave them a Box Office Entertainment Awards for popular loveteam in 2009 and 2010 and two nominations for Dantes in Best Drama Actor category at PMPC Star Awards for Television in 2010 and 2012. The couple worked in two romantic comedy movies One True Love (2008) and You to Me Are Everything (2010).

Dantes received his first Best Actor award in the Korean TV adaptation series Stairway to Heaven (2009) at the 24th PMPC Star Awards for Television and a nomination from Asian Television Awards. In 2015, Dantes won a Best Actor award at the Golden Screen TV Awards in the series Ang Dalawang Mrs. Real (2015) opposite Maricel Soriano and Lovi Poe. The following year, he returned with an action-series Alyas Robin Hood (2016) and won his second Best Drama Actor at the 31st PMPC Star Awards for Television.

In movies, Dantes co-starred with Kris Aquino and Angelica Panganiban in horror movie Segunda Mano (2011) and won a Best Actor award at 37th Metro Manila Film Festival and nominations from FAMAS Award, Luna Award, Golden Screen Movie Award and PMPC Star Awards for Movie. The next year, he returned in the movie One More Try co-starred Angel Locsin, Angelica Panganiban and Zanjoe Marudo; Dantes won his second Best Actor award at the 38th Metro Manila Film Festival and a Gawad Tanglaw Award for Best Actor with nominations from FAMAS Award, Luna Award and PMPC Star Awards for Movie. He starred with Anne Curtis-Smith in Sid & Aya: Not a Love Story (2019) and won The EDDYS Best Actor Award and received nominations from Gawad Urian Award, Luna Award and PMPC Star Awards for Movies.

In 2023, Dantes and Marian Rivera returned to mainstream and starred in the movie Rewind , a Star Cinema's movie entry to 49th Metro Manila Film Festival. Rewind was a box office success with a movie gross of ₱924 million, becoming the highest grossing film of all time and the highest grossing movie in history of Metro Manila Film Festival. He received a Phenomenal Box Office Star and Most Popular Loveteam award with his wife Marian Rivera and Film Actor award at the Box Office Entertainment Awards in 2024. He also received a Best Actor award at the 1st Manila International Film Festival.

As a television host, he received 4 awards from PMPC Star Awards for Television, a Golden Screen TV Awards, an EdukCircle Award and an Asian Academy Creative Awards.

== Awards and nominations ==
Awards and nominations received by Dingdong Dantes
Film and TV Awards	Year	Category	Nominated work	Result	Ref.
Asian Academy Creative Awards	2024	Best Entertainment Host	Family Feud	Won	
Asian Television Awards	2009	Best Actor	Stairway to Heaven	Nominated	
Box Office Entertainment Awards	2003	Prince of RP Movies	Himself	Won	
Box Office Entertainment Awards	2009	Most Phenomenal Loveteam; Special Awards	Dingdong Dantes and Marian Rivera	Won	
Box Office Entertainment Awards	2010	Loveteam of the Year	Dingdong Dantes and Marian Rivera	Won	
Box Office Entertainment Awards	2013	Film Actor of the Year	One More Try	Won	
Box Office Entertainment Awards	2017	Film Actor of the Year	The Unmarried Wife	Won	
Box Office Entertainment Awards	2018	Film Actor of the Year	Seven Sundays	Won	
Box Office Entertainment Awards	2019	Phenomenal Box Office Star	Fantastica	Won	
Box Office Entertainment Awards	2024	Film Actor of the Year	Rewind	Won	
Box Office Entertainment Awards	2024	Phenomenal Box Office Star (shared with Marian Rivera)	Rewind	Won	
Box Office Entertainment Awards	2024	Most Popular Loveteam for Movies	Rewind	Won	
EDDYS Entertainment Editors Choice Awards	2017	Best Actor	The Unmarried Wife	Nominated	
EDDYS Entertainment Editors Choice Awards	2019	Best Actor	Sid & Aya: Not a Love Story	Won	
EDDYS Entertainment Editors Choice Awards	2022	Best Actor	A Hard Day	Nominated	
EDDYS Entertainment Editors Choice Awards	2024	Best Actor	Rewind	Nominated	
EDDYS Entertainment Editors Choice Awards	2024	Box Office Heroes	Rewind	Included	
EdukCircle Awards	2017	Most Influential Film Actor of the Year	The Unmarried Wife	Won	
EdukCircle Awards	2018	Most Influential Film Actor of the Year	Sid & Aya: Not a Love Story	Won	
EdukCircle Awards	2019	Best Educational Host	Amazing Earth	Won	
Gawad Pasado	2018	Best Actor	Seven Sundays	Won	
Gawad Tanglaw Awards	2013	Best Actor	One More Try	Won	
Golden Screen Awards (ENPRESS)	2012	Best Performance by an Actor in a Lead Role-Drama	Segunda Mano	Nominated	
Golden Screen Awards (ENPRESS)	2013	Best Performance by an Actor in a Lead Role-Drama	Tiktik: The Aswang Chronicles	Nominated	
Golden Screen Awards (ENPRESS)	2014	Best Performance by an Actor in a Lead Role-Drama	Dance of the Steel Bars	Nominated	
Golden Screen Television Awards (ENPRESS)	2013	Outstanding Reality Competition Program Host	Protégé: The Battle for the Big Artista Break	Won	
Golden Screen Television Awards (ENPRESS)	2013	Outstanding Performance by an Actor in a Drama Series	My Beloved	Nominated	
Golden Screen Television Awards (ENPRESS)	2014	Outstanding Performance by an Actor in a Drama Series	Pahiram ng Sandali	Nominated	
Golden Screen Television Awards (ENPRESS)	2015	Outstanding Performance by an Actor in a Drama Program	Ang Dalawang Mrs. Real	Won	
Gawad Urian Award	2019	Best Actor	Sid & Aya: Not a Love Story	Nominated	
Gawad Urian Award	2022	Best Actor	A Hard Day	Nominated	
FAMAS Award	2002	German Moreno Youth Achievement Award	Himself	Won	
FAMAS Award	2008	Best Supporting Actor	Resiklo	Nominated	
FAMAS Award	2012	Best Actor	Segunda Mano	Nominated	
FAMAS Award	2013	Best Actor	One More Try	Nominated	
FAMAS Award	2014	Best Actor	She's the One	Nominated	
FAMAS Award	2017	Best Actor	The Unmarried Wife	Nominated	
FAMAS Award	2017	FPJ Memorial Award	Himself	Won	
FAMAS Award	2018	Best Actor	Seven Sundays	Nominated	
FAMAS Award	2024	Best Actor	Rewind	Nominated	
International Golden Summit Excellence Award in Vietnam	2025	Television Icon of the Year	Family Feud	Won	
FAP or Luna Awards	2012	Best Actor	Segunda Mano	Nominated	
FAP or Luna Awards	2013	Best Actor	One More Try	Nominated	
FAP or Luna Awards	2019	Best Actor	Sid & Aya: Not a Love Story	Nominated	
Manila International Film Festival	2024	Best Actor	Rewind	Won	
Metro Manila Film Festival	2011	Best Actor	Segunda Mano	Won	
Metro Manila Film Festival	2012	Best Actor	One More Try	Won	
Metro Manila Film Festival	2014	Best Actor	Kubot: The Aswang Chronicles 2	Nominated	
Metro Manila Film Festival	2021	Best Actor	A Hard Day	Nominated	
Metro Manila Film Festival	2023	Best Actor	Rewind	Nominated	
Metro Manila Film Festival	2023	Best Supporting Actor	Firefly	Nominated	
Nickelodeon	2008	Favorite Television Actor	Himself	Won	
PMPC Star Awards for Movies	2008	Movie Director of the Year	Angels	Nominated	
PMPC Star Awards for Movies	2012	Movie Actor of the Year	Segunda Mano	Nominated	
PMPC Star Awards for Movies	2013	Movie Actor of the Year	One More Try	Nominated	
PMPC Star Awards for Movies	2014	Movie Actor of the Year	Dance of the Steel Bars	Nominated	
PMPC Star Awards for Movies	2017	Movie Actor of the Year	The Unmarried Wife	Nominated	
PMPC Star Awards for Movies	2018	Movie Actor of the Year	Seven Sundays	Nominated	
PMPC Star Awards for Movies	2019	Movie Actor of the Year	Sid & Aya: Not a Love Story	Nominated	
PMPC Star Awards for Television	2004	Best Talent Search Program Host	Starstruck	Nominated	
PMPC Star Awards for Television	2006	Best Talent Search Program Host	StarStruck: The Nationwide Invasion	Nominated	
PMPC Star Awards for Television	2007	Best Talent Search Program Host	StarStruck: The Next Level	Won	
PMPC Star Awards for Television	2010	Best Drama Actor	Stairway to Heaven	Won	
PMPC Star Awards for Television	2011	Best Drama Actor	Endless Love	Nominated	
PMPC Star Awards for Television	2012	Best Drama Actor	My Beloved	Nominated	
PMPC Star Awards for Television	2012	Best Talent Search Program Host	Protégé: The Battle For The Big Artista Break	Nominated	
PMPC Star Awards for Television	2013	Best Reality Competition Program Host	Protégé: The Battle For The Big Artista Break	Nominated	
PMPC Star Awards for Television	2014	Best Drama Actor	Ang Dalawang Mrs. Real	Nominated	
PMPC Star Awards for Television	2016	Best Talent Search Program Host	StarStruck	Nominated	
PMPC Star Awards for Television	2017	Best Drama Actor	Alyas Robin Hood	Won	
PMPC Star Awards for Television	2018	Best Educational Program Host	Amazing Earth	Nominated	
PMPC Star Awards for Television	2019	Best Drama Actor	Cain at Abel	Nominated	
PMPC Star Awards for Television	2019	Best Education Program Host	Amazing Earth	Nominated	
PMPC Star Awards for Television	2021	Best Drama Actor	Descendants of the Sun	Nominated	
PMPC Star Awards for Television	2021	Best Educational Program Host	Amazing Earth	Won	
PMPC Star Awards for Television	2025	Best Game Show Host	Family Feud	Won	
PMPC Star Awards for Television	2025	Best Talent Search Program Host	The Voice Kids Philippines	Nominated	
PMPC Star Awards for Television	2025	Best Educational Program Host	Amazing Earth	Won	
Seoul International Drama Awards	2020	Asian Star Prize Award	Descendants of the Sun	Won	

=== Special awards ===
Year	Organization	Categories
2007	Cosmopolitan Magazine	2007's Number 1 Bachelor of the Year
2008	Yes Magazine Readers Choice Awards	Young Male Superstar: Rank #1
2008	Yes Magazine Readers Choice Awards	Most Popular Loveteam with Marian Rivera
2008	E! Entertainment Television Hollywood	Top 25 Sexiest Men in the World: Rank #3
2008	Philippine Walk of Fame	Walk of Fame Awardee
2009	YES Magazine	Most Powerful in Showbiz: Rank #7
2013	Movie Writers Welfare Foundation	Gintong Palad Public Service Awardee with Marian Rivera
2013	International Business and Academe Conference	Outstanding Youth Ambassador Awardee
2013	Anak TV Awards	Anak TV Makabata Awardee
2014	Anak TV Awards	Anak TV Makabata Awardee
2023	GMA Gala 2023	Couple of the Night with Marian Rivera

=== Entertainment awards ===
Year	Organization	Categories
2007	1st Annual Fil-Am Visionary Awards	Favourite Television Actor
2008	Supreme to the Extreme Awards	Best in Chemistry with Marian Rivera
2009	SOP Kapuso Tag Awards	Most Romantic Kapuso Smooch with Marian Rivera
2009	SOP Kapuso Tag Awards	Most Kapuso Blopped with Marian Rivera
2009	SOP Kapuso Tag Awards	Kapuso Male Fav-Artist
2012	1st Party Pilipinas Most Liked Awards	Most Liked Love Team with Marian Rivera
2012	1st Party Pilipinas Most Liked Awards	Most Liked Kilig Moments with Marian Rivera
2012	Meg Top Choice Awards	Hottest Couple with Marian Rivera
2012	1st Party Pilipinas Most Liked Awards	Most Liked Kapuso Drama Actor
