= Dingdong Dantes =

Filipino actor and filmmaker (born 1980)

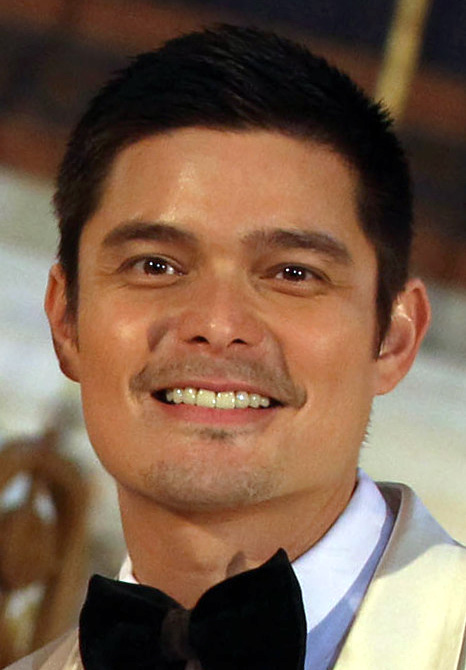
- Dantes at his wedding to Marian Rivera, December 2014

Commissioner-at-large of the National Youth Commission
- In office May 2014 – April 2016
- President: Benigno Aquino III
- Chairperson: Gregorio Ramon Tingson

Personal details
- Born: Jose Sixto Gonzalez Dantes III; August 2, 1980 (age 46) Quezon City, Philippines
- Spouse: Marian Rivera (m. 2014)
- Children: 2
- Relatives: Bianca Gonzalez (cousin); Arthur Solinap (cousin); Carlo Gonzales (cousin); Enrique Gil (uncle)
- Education: San Beda University; West Negros University; Ateneo de Manila University
- Occupation: Actor; director; television personality
- Awards: Full list
- Works: Filmography

Military service
- Allegiance: Philippines
- Branch/service: Philippine Navy; Naval Reserve Command
- Years of service: 2006–present
- Rank: Lieutenant Commander

Jose Sixto "Dingdong" Gonzalez Dantes III (born August 2, 1980) is a Filipino actor, director, and television personality. He is known for his acting versatility and his dramatic and fantasy-action roles in film and television. Dantes's accolades include 10 Box Office Entertainment Awards, five PMPC Star Awards for Television, two FAMAS Awards, two EDDYS Awards, two Metro Manila Film Festival awards, a Seoul International Drama Award, an Asian Academy Creative Award, and a PMPC Star Award for Movies, as well as nominations for a Gawad Urian Award, a Luna Award, and an Asian Television Award.

Dantes gained prominence in the early 2000s when he co-starred with Tanya Garcia in the drama series Sana ay Ikaw na Nga (2001) and Twin Hearts (2004). He achieved greater recognition in the late 2000s for his role opposite Marian Rivera in the television adaptation of Marimar (2007). His other notable television appearances include Stairway to Heaven (2009), Endless Love (2010), and I Heart You, Pare! (2011). In addition to acting, Dantes has established himself as a television presenter, hosting several programs such as StarStruck (2003–2019), Family Feud (2009–present), Amazing Earth (2018–present), and The Voice Generations (2023). Dantes has produced his own films under his production company, AgostoDos Pictures, including Segunda Mano (2011), Tiktik: The Aswang Chronicles (2012), Kubot: The Aswang Chronicles 2 (2014), and Rewind (2023), the last of which became the highest-grossing film in the Philippines. He married Rivera in 2014, with whom he has two children.

== Early life and education ==
Jose Sixto Gonzales Dantes III was born on August 2, 1980, in Quezon City, Philippines to Angeline Gonzales-Dantes and Jose Sixto "Jig" Dantes Jr, a commander of Philippine Coast Guard Auxiliary. He is the eldest son of five siblings with three younger sisters and a younger brother.

Dantes studied at San Beda University but moved to Ateneo de Manila University to finish high school. He pursued higher education while juggling his showbiz career. Dantes enrolled college at West Negros University with a degree in Business Administration majoring in marketing. He graduated from college in 2014.

He was enlisted as member of Philippine Naval Reserve Command in 2006 and was promoted to the rank of Lieutenant Commander in 2020. He graduated as part of Naval Combat Engineer Officer Class in 2023 and had his field training as military reservist.

== Career ==
Dantes began his career as a child model. Several other commercials ensued before he joined an all-male dance group called Abztract Dancers, with his friend, actor Nathan Dados, and his cousin, actor Arthur Solinap. Their group became regulars on Eat Bulaga! and That's Entertainment.

As an actor, his first movie appearance was in the Shake, Rattle & Roll V episode "Anino". After three years, he debuted on GMA Network's youth-oriented T.G.I.S. when he was 17, under the name Raphael Dantes playing the role of Iñaki. He was first paired with Antoinette Taus. Dantes and Taus became one of the most memorable loveteams in Philippine entertainment industry, especially in the '90s. He appeared in films like Honey My Love So Sweet, Kiss Mo 'Ko and I'm Sorry My Love, and television show Anna Karenina.

=== 2000s ===
In 2000, Dantes appeared in the sitcom Super Klenk. In 2001, he was paired with actress Tanya García as they top-billed GMA-7's primetime soap opera series Sana ay Ikaw na Nga. The two headlined in another primetime romance-drama billing in 2003 titled Twin Hearts. He took on several hosting jobs including beauty pageants such as Binibining Pilipinas and GMA Network's reality artist search, StarStruck, and the game show Family Feud before its transfer to Edu Manzano. Aside from his television stints, he also appeared in films including Magkapatid and Pangarap Ko Ang Ibigin Ka. He hosts the suspense-thriller Wag Kukurap, occasionally directing. He played King Ybrahim/Ybarro in the Encantadia fantasy-themed television saga and the 2006 film Moments of Love.

In 2007, Dantes portrayed the lead role Sergio to Marian Rivera's character, Marimar in Marimar. During the same year, he was named No. 1 Bachelor of 2007 by Cosmopolitan magazine (Philippines). He won the USTV Students’ Choice Award for "Most Popular Actor in a Drama/Mini-series."

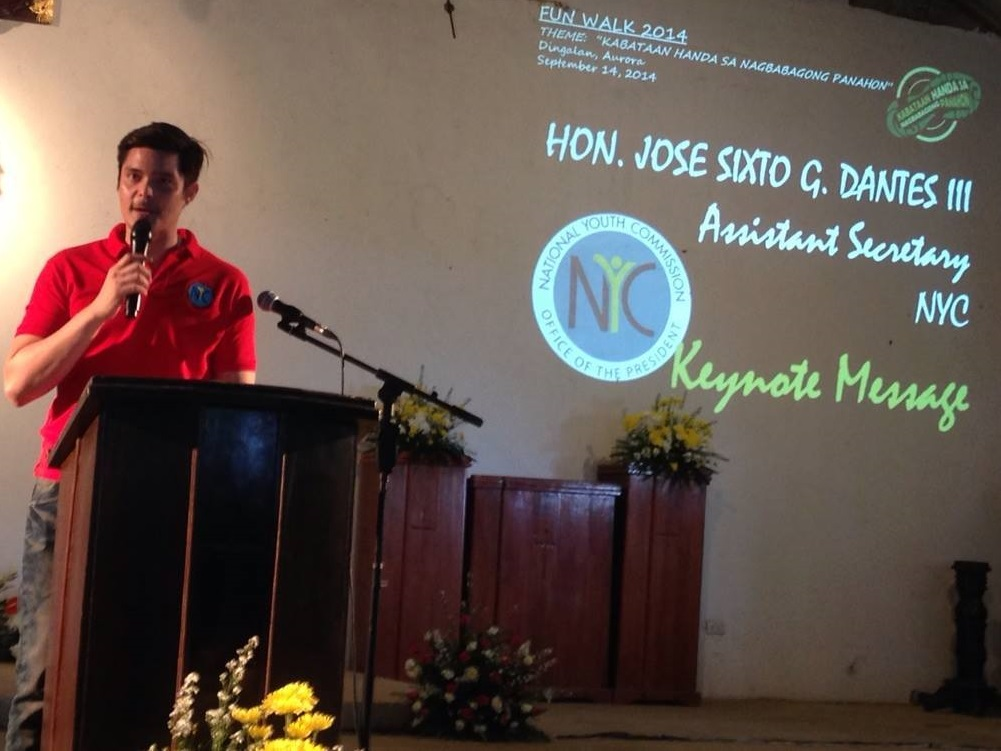
Dantes at the National Youth Commission event in Dingalan, Aurora, September 15, 2014.

In 2008, he was cast by his home studio to play the role of Fredo, a love interest of Dyesebel in Dyesebel. In March 2008, he debuted as the Bench image model. Also in 2008, Dantes starred in One True Love. The Cinema Evaluation Board of the Philippines rated the film a B.

In early 2009, Dantes appeared on Ang Babaeng Hinugot sa Aking Tadyang. He was chosen as Myx guest VJ in August 2009 to promote his album The Dingdong Dantes Experience. The album turned gold one week after it was released on the variety show SOP. Dantes was chosen to portray the role of "Cholo" in the 2009 Philippine adaptation of the Korean drama Stairway to Heaven. He also replaced Richard Gomez as the new host for Family Feud.

Dantes founded YesPinoy Foundation on August 21, 2009. It helped bridged the resources gap in education, and assisted out-of-school youth and children of fallen soldiers.

=== 2010s ===
In 2010, Dantes was scheduled to release You to Me Are Everything. He was part of Regine Velasquez and Ogie Alcasid's U.S. tour mid-May to June. He appeared in the television show Endless Love from June 25 to October 15, 2010. Dantes became a cohost of Party Pilipinas on channel 7. He won the "Best Drama Actor Award" for Stairway To Heaven in the 2010 PMPC Star Awards for TV and was nominated for the same category at the 2010 Asian Television Awards.

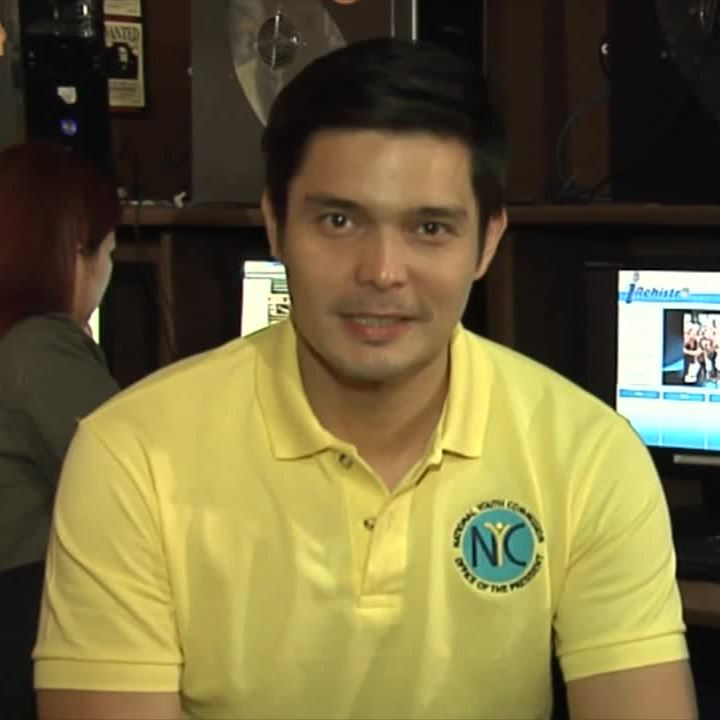
Dantes as NYC Commissioner in October 2014.

In 2011, Dantes did a comedy primetime TV series titled, I Heart You, Pare! with his leading lady Regine Velasquez. He plays an obnoxious macho guy who falls with a heterosexual woman played by Velásquez who, after a chance encounter, met again as she plays a drag who tries to run away from the law. Unfortunately Regine Velasquez left seven weeks before the series came to a close due to her pregnancy with husband Ogie Alcasid. Iza Calzado replaced Velasquez in the series.

He was part of the Star Cinema suspense film Segunda Mano with Kris Aquino and Angelica Panganiban as he played the main antagonist role, Ivan. This marked Dantes' first project with the rival station and film archive Star Cinema, a division of ABS-CBN. It was also his first time to work with Kapamilya stars. He stated that he signed a one-film contract with Star Cinema to do the film and work with Kris Aquino.

He did a primetime TV series, My Beloved which aired on February 13, 2012. In June 2012, he was chosen to star in another MMFF Entry for 2012 in the film One More Try starring Kapamilya actors Angelica Panganiban, Angel Locsin and Zanjoe Marudo. It was Dante's second film with rival Star Cinema of ABS-CBN and was a comeback for Ruel S. Bayani after his critically acclaimed successful blockbuster film No Other Woman hit the box-office last year. In November 2012, Dantes was set in a primetime TV series Pahiram ng Sandali with Lorna Tolentino, Christopher de Leon and Max Collins.

In 2013, Dantes and Marian Rivera joined PETA in their campaign to free the elephant Mali from the Manila Zoo, where she has been kept for the majority of her life alone in a tiny enclosure and in need of proper care.

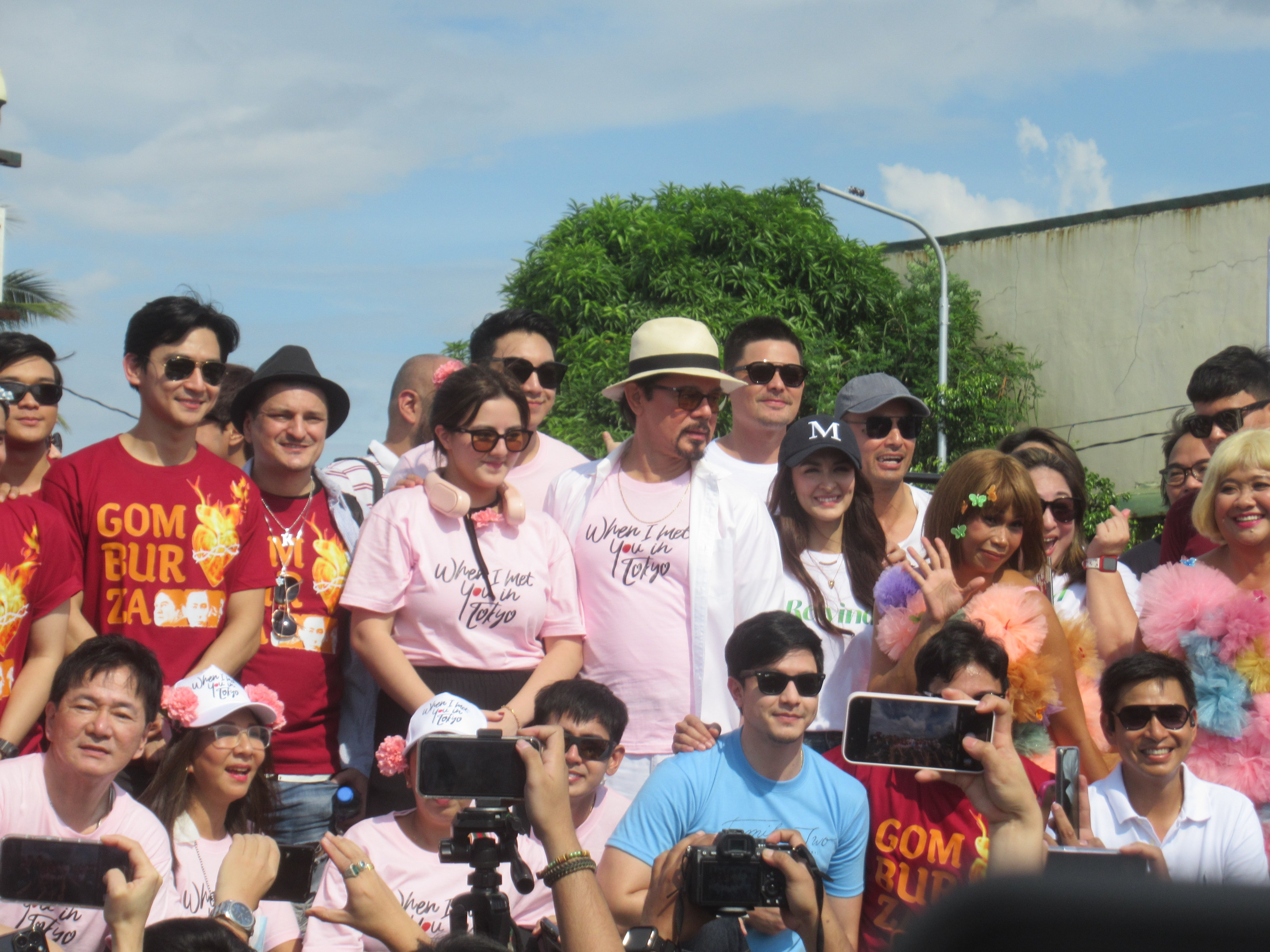
Dantes (2023 Metro Manila Film Festival)

On May 5, 2014, Dantes was appointed and sworn in by President Benigno Aquino III as commissioner-at-large of the National Youth Commission. Two years later, he decided to resign as the NYC commissioner to give way for his endorsement for Grace Poe as president and Leni Robredo as vice president in the 2016 national elections.

In April 2017, he visited Calapan, Oriental Mindoro to inaugurate the Mindoro State College of Agriculture and Technology (MinSCAT) Grandstand. A day later, he became the guest speaker during the 43rd Commencement Exercises of Mindoro State College of Agriculture and Technology-Calapan Campus.

=== 2020s ===
In 2020, Dantes appeared in a Philippine adaptation of Descendants of the Sun from South Korean TV series of his role Capt. Lucas Manalo, together with Jennylyn Mercado.

In 2022, Dantes hosted the game show as the second time on GMA Network, Family Feud. During the season break, he appeared in his drama Royal Blood and hosted The Voice Generations.

On October 30, 2023, Dantes joined Mowelfund's Board of Trustees.

His next films were part of the 2023 Metro Manila Film Festival: Rewind, directed by Mae Cruz-Alviar where he co-starred with Marian Rivera in a lead role, and Firefly, directed by Zig Dulay, where he played an adult version of a character played by Euwenn Mikaell. Rewind became one of the highest grossing Filipino movies of all time and the highest-grossing movie in Metro Manila Film Festival history.

== Other ventures ==
=== Business ===
Dantes owned AgostoDos Pictures, an independent film studio established in 2011. He is the CEO of Doorbell Apps, a delivery apps which offers work to jobless showbiz workers. In 2025, he also ventured into food business chain and partnered with MESA, a restaurant food group. He wanted to be a franchise owner of MESA restaurant 88, as a gift to Marian Rivera-Dantes, his wife.

=== Motorcyclist ===
Dantes is a passionate motorcyclist. In 2015, he enrolled in California Superbike School. He trained motorcycle in Clark International Speedway in Pampanga. He is a member of motorbike enthusiast called, Euro Monkeys Philippines including fellow actors Aga Muhlach, Paulo Avelino, Dominique Roque and Kim Atienza. Euro Monkeys Philippines is an exclusive motorcycle conglomerate that supports and promotes safe motorcycle riding.

In 2019, Dantes shared his experiences in riding motorcycles with his team in Europe covering four countries: Spain, Italy, Monaco and France in a 2,000 kilometers motorbike ride on his TV show, Amazing Earth. Dantes has several collection of motorbikes including Ducati Diavel, BMW R100 Scramble, Ducati Sports Classic 1000s, Ducati Paul Smart.

=== Sports ===
Dantes has been a sports enthusiast. He is a NCCAA Alumni.

He took part in RunFest 2016 and finished 10 km run. He joined a 42 km Berlin Marathon in 2019. Dantes participated in several marathon for a cause namely, UNICEF Heros for Children Run, Book Run for Yes Pinoy Foundation, Lights, Camera, Run for Mowelfund members and a marathon against Corruption.

In 2016, he joined his first IronMan Triathlon race with Kim Atienza, his teammates in Team Gotta for the Asia Pacific Championship in Cebu; where he finished a 90 kilometer bike ride. Dantes also joined the IronMan Triathlon race 70.3 Davao in 2019.

== Personal life ==
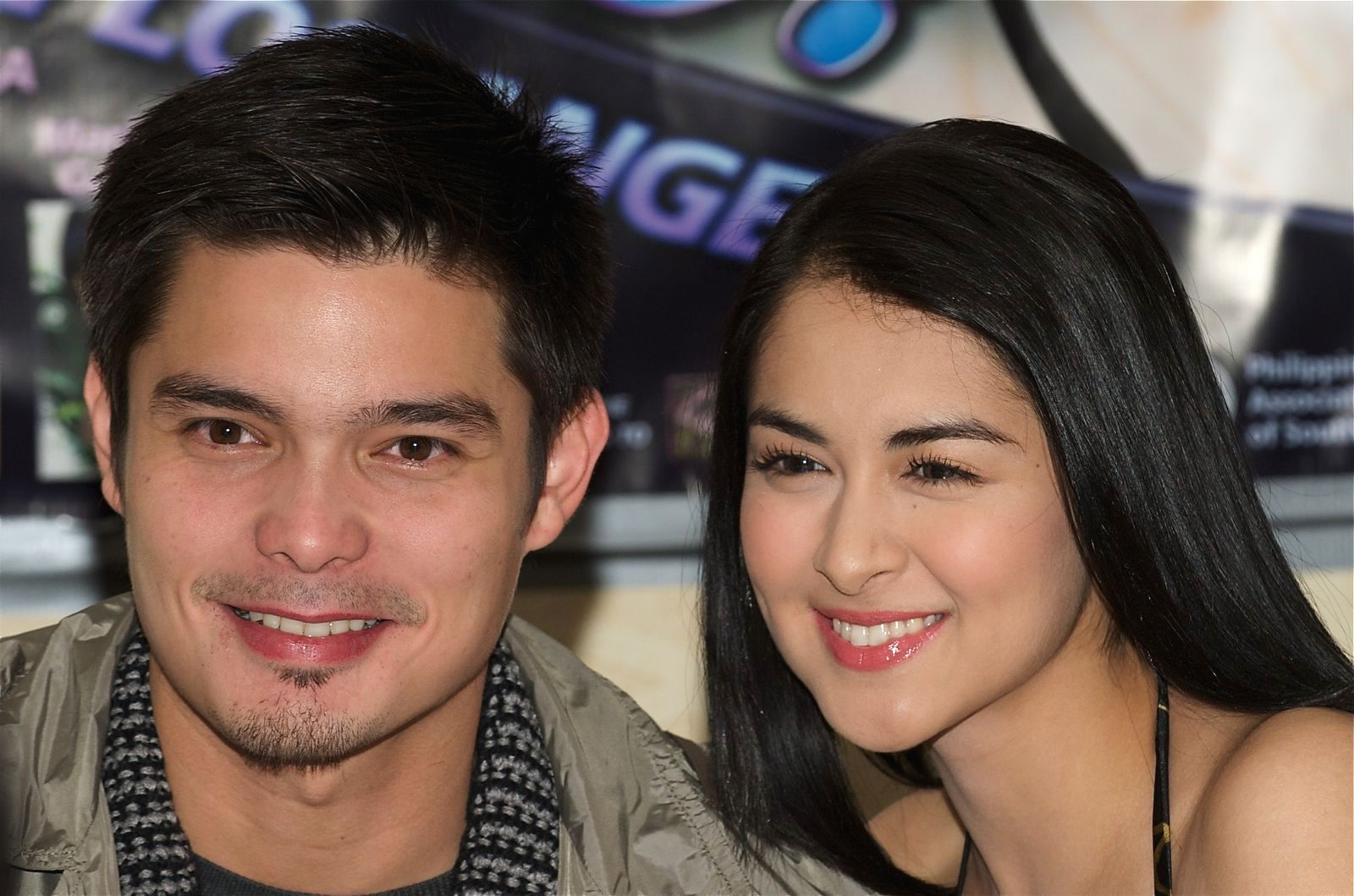
Dantes with Marian Rivera in December 2008

Dantes proposed for the second time to his perennial leading lady and longtime girlfriend, Marian Rivera, on the Marian dance show on August 9, 2014. They met on the set of Marimar in 2007. His first proposal was in Macau in August 2012.

On December 30, 2014 (Rizal Day), Dantes married Rivera in the Immaculate Conception Cathedral, Cubao, Quezon City. Both Dantes and Rivera are exclusive artists of GMA Network. After years of hard work and proven successes of their television projects, both individually or together, GMA gave them the honor of the title as their network's primetime king and queen. Thus, their wedding was given the title "The Royal Wedding". They announced an expected first child in April 2015; Rivera gave birth to Maria Letizia on November 23, 2015, (Note: Attributed to multiple references:) and later gave birth to their second child Jose Sixto IV (Sixto) on April 16, 2019, Holy Tuesday of the Holy Week.

Dantes is the cousin of fellow actors Carlo Gonzalez, Arthur Solinap, and former sports anchor and current TV host Bianca Gonzalez-Intal. He is also related to actor Enrique Gil in which Dantes referred Enrique as his uncle.

== Filmography ==
=== Selected filmography ===
Film

- I'm Sorry, My Love (1998)
- Honey, My Love So Sweet (1999)
- Spirit of the Glass (2004)
- Mulawin: The Movie (2005)
- Moments of Love (2006)
- Resiklo (2007)
- One True Love (2008)
- Kimmy Dora: Kambal sa Kiyeme (2009)
- Segunda Mano (2011)
- Tiktik: The Aswang Chronicles (2012)
- One More Try (2012)
- She's the One (2013)
- The Unmarried Wife (2016)
- Seven Sundays (2017)
- Sid & Aya: Not a Love Story (2018)
- A Hard Day (2021)
- Firefly (2023)
- Rewind (2023)
- Only We Know (2025)
- Remember (2026)

Television

- Anna Karenina (1996–2002)
- Sana ay Ikaw na Nga (2001–2003)
- Encantadia (2005)
- Etheria: Ang Ikalimang Kaharian ng Encantadia (2005–2006)
- Atlantika (2006–2007)
- Marimar (2007–2008)
- Dyesebel (2008)
- Ang Babaeng Hinugot sa Aking Tadyang (2009)
- Stairway to Heaven (2009)
- Endless Love (2010)
- I Heart You, Pare! (2011)
- My Beloved (2012)
- Genesis (2013)
- Ang Dalawang Mrs. Real (2014)
- Pari 'Koy (2015)
- Encantadia 2016 (2016)
- Alyas Robin Hood (2016–2017)
- Cain at Abel (2018–2019)
- Descendants of the Sun (2020)
- Royal Blood (2023)
- The Master Cutter (2026)

== Awards and recognitions ==
Dantes dubbed as the Kapuso Primetime King has received several awards and nominations throughout his career in the entertainment industry. He is known for his acting versatility and played dramatic and fantasy-action roles in movies and television. His accolades include 11 times Box Office Entertainment Awards, 5 times PMPC Star Awards for Television, 3 times EdukCircle Awards, 2 times FAMAS Award, 2 times EDDYS Awards, 2 times Metro Manila Film Festival for Best Actor, 1 time Manila International Film Festival for Best Actor, a Seoul International Drama Awards Asian Star Prize, an Asian Academy Creative Awards for Best Entertainment Host, a Nickeledon Kids Choice Awards, a Gawad Pasado Award and a Gawad Tanglaw Award and a PMPC Star Awards for Movie including nominations from Gawad Urian Award, Golden Screen Awards for Movie, Luna Award and an Asian Television Awards nomination.
