= Spirit of the Glass =

- Directed by: Jose Javier Reyes
- Written by: Jose Javier Reyes
- Produced by: Orly R. Ilacad; Paul K. Ilacad; Catherine K. Ilacad
- Starring: Marvin Agustin; Rica Peralejo; Alessandra de Rossi; Dingdong Dantes
- Cinematography: Lito 'Itok' Mempin; Ricardo Jose Tropeo
- Edited by: Vito Cajili
- Music by: Francis Guevarra; Freddie Marquez
- Production companies: OctoArts Films; Canary Films
- Distributed by: OctoArts Films
- Release date: December 25, 2004 (Philippines)
- Running time: 102 minutes
- Country: Philippines
- Language: Filipino
- Box office: ₱39.3 million

Spirit of the Glass is a 2004 Philippine supernatural horror film written and directed by Jose Javier Reyes. The film stars Rica Peralejo, with the supporting cast includes Marvin Agustin, Dingdong Dantes, Ciara Sotto, Drew Arellano, and Jake Cuenca and follows a group of people moving into a house by playing on a ouija board only for them to encounter supernatural elements from the past.

Produced with Canary Films and distributed by Octoarts Films, the film was theatrically released on December 25, 2004, as one of the official entries at the 30th Metro Manila Film Festival. A sequel entitled Spirit of the Glass 2: The Haunted was released in 2017.

== Plot ==
Sometime in the 1960s, a brutally beat-up Dante (Marvin Agustin) was dragged down by hitman Fredo (Dido Dela Paz) and his henchmen for him to be buried alive as requested by Carlos (Mark Gil) while a young caretaker named Andoy (Archie Masibay) witnessed it.

Forty years later, hotel receptionist Kelly (Rica Peralejo) and her companions, known as "The Love Team", consisting of her boyfriend and photographer Choppy (Dingdong Dantes), her coworker Cecile (Ciara Sotto) and her boyfriend and architect Anton (Drew Arellano), her stoning brother Aries (Jay Aquitania) and his friend PJ (Jake Cuenca) and an overheated couple Drew and Myra (Paolo Contis and Alessandra de Rossi), are planning to go on vacation at a remote house during Holy Week.

When the Team arrived there, they were greeted by an elderly Andoy (Cris Daluz) and his wife Mara, who was also a caretaker. The team ends up unpacking their things to stay there for a few days. Later that night, Drew and Myra argued a bit while Choppy took some photos for his deadline, PJ and Aries noticed the blood drippings and Anton looked at something inside the wardrobe.

The next day, Choppy took a couple of pictures of Kelly, while PJ and Aries were at the lake talking to the caretakers. Back at the house, Drew and Myra discovered what looked like a ouija board. The "Love Team", except for Cecile, who was too scared, ended up playing at night while Mang Andoy warned them not to. Kelly was asking the spirit about what was happening and causing everyone to move the glass uncontrollably as she ends up breaking it, resulting in a complete panic.

The group eventually left the house, never to return there as a result of the incident. Anton and Drew went to a renovated room when a figure shows up watching Anton for the schematics. Meanwhile, Choppy was looking at his computer when he noticed that a shadowy figure was next to Kelly from the picture he took a day before and Kelly spotted somebody in white clothes during her time in the hotel.

Kelly and Choppy stopped by at Myra's house and she told them about what she saw in her bathroom last night before Choppy showed her the pictures he took on the second day of the trip.

After having a conversation with Cecile about the spirit's appearance, Kelly headed to her car and the spirit appears once again scaring her. Kelly's father, Caloy, vaguely revealed that Auring was actually the sister of his mother, Adriana, which led the two to go to her house.

An elderly Adriana eventually remembered the fact that her brother Carlos was very angry at his sister Auring, who soon found out that she was dating Dante.

Sometime in the following days, Choppy and Drew eventually went to Ada's house and said about the house the Team visited there.

Back at the house, Ada and the "Love Team" performed a ritual to know what happens with Dante many years ago before flashbacking into the moment that Dante was looking for Auring, only for him to get beaten up and buried him alive by Fredo and his henchmen. As for Auring, she was looking for Dante and made her brother Carlos upset by sending her upstairs to the room while the young Adriana tried to stop him from doing this, causing her to die of suicide from hanging which leads to the spirit being present encountering the group.

This snaps back to reality after Auring and Dante sacrificed together as the spirit was eventually free and Kelly and Ada passed out from this.

The next morning, the Team are preparing to leave the house only to discover the sound of footsteps coming from upstairs turning out that the little girl was holding the ouija board along with other ghosts, who the team apparently summoned during this previously. When she asked everyone to play, the film ends with the group screaming for their lives while transitioning to the tree circling around.

== Cast ==
- Rica Peralejo as Kelly/Auring
- Marvin Agustin as Dante
- Dingdong Dantes as Choppy
- Paolo Contis as Drew
- Ciara Sotto as Cecille
- Drew Arellano as Anton
- Alessandra De Rossi as Myra
- Jake Cuenca as PJ
- Jill Yulo as young Adriana
- Jay Aquitania as Aries
- Dido Dela Paz† as Fredo
- Cris Daluz† as Mang Andoy
- Menggie Cobarrubias† as Caloy
- Ana Capri as Ada
- Mark Gil† as Carlos
- Lollie Mara† as Adriana
- Thor Dulay as himself (uncredited)

== Sequel ==
A sequel titled Spirit of the Glass 2: The Haunted was released in the Philippines in November 2017. A reviewer for Rappler was critical of the movie, as they felt that the first film didn't require a sequel and that "The only thing really scary about 'Spirit of the Glass 2: The Haunted' is the amount of babble one has to endure to get anything out of the film".

== See also ==
- List of ghost films
