= Remember (2026 film) =

2026 drama film by Mae Cruz-Alviar

- Theatrical poster
- Directed by: Mae Cruz-Alviar
- Screenplay by: Enrico C. Santos; Daisy Cayanan-Mejares
- Story by: Enrico C. Santos
- Produced by: Daisy Cayanan-Mejares; Marjorie B. Lachica; Camille G. Montaño
- Starring: Dingdong Dantes; Marian Rivera
- Cinematography: Yves R. Jamero
- Edited by: Marya Ignacio
- Music by: Cesar Francis S. Concio
- Production companies: ABS-CBN Film Productions; ABS-CBN Studios; AgostoDos Pictures; APT Entertainment; Regal Entertainment
- Distributed by: ABS-CBN Film Productions
- Release date: 11 November 2026
- Running time: 111 minutes
- Country: Philippines
- Language: Filipino

Remember is a 2026 Philippine drama film directed by Mae Cruz-Alviar and written by Enrico C. Santos and Daisy Cayanan-Mejares (who also serves as co-producer) from a story by Santos. Starring Dingdong Dantes and Marian Rivera, the story follows a separated couple who have lost sight of what it is to love one another, and they end up pretending to be a couple once more for their daughter, whose memories began to fade.

A co-production of ABS-CBN Film Productions, ABS-CBN Studios, AgostoDos Pictures, APT Entertainment, and Regal Entertainment, the film was released theatrically in the Philippines on 11 November 2026.

== Cast ==
- Dingdong Dantes as Joseph
- Marian Rivera as Ria
- Zia Grace as Ella, Joseph and Ria's daughter
- Joross Gamboa
- Kyle Echarri
- Ana Abad Santos
- Aiza Marquez
- Carla Humphries
- Jobert Austria
- Jeff Lamay as Hugo
- Dominic Lorange as Otto / Pierre

== Production ==
=== Filming ===
Principal photography commenced in the second week of June 2026, with the lead stars departing for Quebec.

== Release ==
Apart from its nationwide release on 11 November, the film is also scheduled to be released overseas on 12 November in the United Arab Emirates, Qatar, Bahrain, Australia, and New Zealand, and on 13 November in the United States, Canada, and Guam. It is also yet to be screened in Singapore and Malaysia.
