= Stairway to Heaven (Philippine TV series) =

2009 Philippine television drama series

- Title card
- Genre: Romantic drama
- Based on: Stairway to Heaven (2003) by Park Hye-kyung
- Developed by: Dode Cruz
- Written by: Dode Cruz; Suzette Doctolero; Des Garbes-Severino; Denoy Navarro-Punio
- Directed by: Joyce E. Bernal; Andoy Ranay; Mac Alejandre
- Starring: Dingdong Dantes; Rhian Ramos
- Theme music composer: Romer Timberza; Elmer Blancaflor; Richard Gonzales
- Opening theme: "Pag-ibig Ko'y Pansinin" by Regine Velasquez
- Country of origin: Philippines
- Original language: Tagalog
- No. of episodes: 65 (list of episodes)

Production
- Executive producer: Joseph Buncalan
- Production locations: Metro Manila; Kalibo, Aklan; Enchanted Kingdom, Santa Rosa, Laguna
- Camera setup: Multiple-camera setup
- Running time: 18–38 minutes
- Production company: GMA Entertainment TV

Original release
- Network: GMA Network
- Release: September 14 – December 11, 2009

Stairway to Heaven is a 2009 Philippine television drama romance series broadcast by GMA Network. The series is based on a 2003 South Korean television series of the same title. Directed by Joyce E. Bernal, Andoy Ranay and Mac Alejandre, it stars Dingdong Dantes and Rhian Ramos. It premiered on September 14, 2009, on the network's Telebabad line up. The series concluded on December 11, 2009, with a total of 65 episodes.

The series was released on DVD by GMA Home Video and is streaming online on YouTube.

== Cast and characters ==
Cast

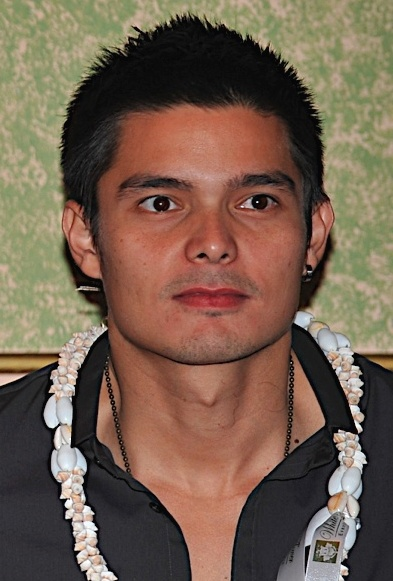
Dingdong Dantes

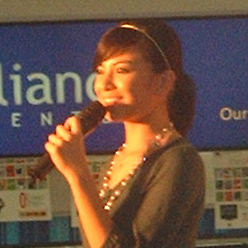
Glaiza de Castro

Lead cast

- Dingdong Dantes as Pocholo "Cholo" Fuentebella
- Rhian Ramos as Jodi Reyes-Fuentebella / Jenna Cruz

Supporting cast

- TJ Trinidad as Tristan Aragon / Charlie Matias
- Glaiza de Castro as Eunice Aragon
- Sandy Andolong as Zoila Fuentebella
- Jestoni Alarcon as Jovan Reyes
- Jean Garcia as Maita Aragon-Reyes
- Soliman Cruz as Dindo Aragon
- Karen delos Reyes as Bernadette "Badet" Mallari
- Carlo Gonzalez as Enrico
- Paul Holmes as John
- Say Alonzo as Sheryl
- Ricci Chan as Giorgio

Guest cast

- Joshua Dionisio as younger Cholo
- Barbie Forteza as younger Jodi
- Jhake Vargas as younger Tristan
- Jhoana Marie Tan as younger Eunice
- Mosang as Violet
- Nonie Buencamino as Rodolfo

== Development ==
Stairway to Heaven is a South Korean television drama series broadcast by Seoul Broadcasting System. Written by Park Hye-kyung and directed by Lee Jang-soo, the series starred Kwon Sang-woo and Choi Ji-woo. The television series was broadcast in the Philippines through GMA Network.

== Production ==
Principal photography commenced on August 17, 2009.

== Ratings ==
According to AGB Nielsen Philippines' Mega Manila household television ratings, the pilot episode of Stairway to Heaven earned a 33.5% rating. The final episode scored a 30.7% rating.

== Accolades ==
Accolades received by Stairway to Heaven
Year	Award	Category	Recipient	Result	Ref.
2010	Asian Television Awards	Best Actor	Dingdong Dantes	Nominated	
2010	37th Guillermo Mendoza Awards	Favorite Television Drama	Stairway to Heaven	Nominated	
2010	24th PMPC Star Awards for Television	Best Drama Actor	Dingdong Dantes	Won	
