= The Unmarried Wife =

2016 romantic drama film by Maryo J. Delos Reyes

- Official movie poster
- Directed by: Maryo J. de los Reyes
- Written by: Vanessa R. Valdez
- Story by: Keiko Aquino
- Produced by: Elma S. Medua
- Starring: Angelica Panganiban; Dingdong Dantes; Paulo Avelino
- Cinematography: Jun Gonzales
- Edited by: Tara Illenberger
- Music by: Jesse Lucas
- Production company: Star Cinema
- Distributed by: ABS-CBN Film Productions
- Release date: November 16, 2016
- Running time: 130 minutes
- Country: Philippines
- Language: Filipino
- Box office: ₱17 million (Opening day); ₱246.3 million (Three-week run)

The Unmarried Wife is a 2016 Filipino romantic drama film directed by Maryo J. de los Reyes (in his final feature film directing role before his death almost two years later) from a story and screenplay written by Vanessa R. Valdez, based on an original story by Keiko Aquino. Starring Angelica Panganiban, Dingdong Dantes, and Paulo Avelino, the film revolves around a woman who was torn between her husband and her lover.

Produced and distributed by ABS-CBN Film Productions, the film was theatrically released in the Philippines on November 16, 2016, with limited screenings in the United States and Canada. It marks the reunion of Panganiban and Dantes (which is his fourth film for the film studio) after their box-office success with One More Try (2012), which co-starred with Angel Locsin and Zanjoe Marudo.

== Synopsis ==
Anne, a successful brand manager, files for an annulment from Geoff, her unfaithful husband who has cheated on her repeatedly. Anne meets Bryan, a carefree man who is also separated from his wife. After her initial hesitation, Anne warms up and begins a relationship with Bryan despite still being legally married to her husband. Rediscovering her new life, Anne is torn between her unresolved feelings towards her husband and her new lover.

== Cast ==
Main cast

- Angelica Panganiban as Anne Victorio
- Dingdong Dantes as Geoff Victorio
- Paulo Avelino as Bryan

Supporting cast

- Maricar Reyes as Cristina
- Denise Laurel as Louise
- Dimples Romana as Carmela
- Justin Cuyugan as Bobby
- Martin Escudero as Geru
- Pamu Pamorada as Laika
- Lei Andre Navarro as Ino
- Irma Adlawan as Veronica
- Marina Benipayo as Lorraine
- Loren Burgos as Lorena

Guest cast

- Joan Palisoc as Camille
- Jace Flores as Frank
- Joaquin Manansala as Jax
- Anne Feo

== Release ==
The film was released on November 16, 2016, in Philippine cinemas nationwide, earning ₱17 million on its first day of showing. On its 6th day, the film breached the ₱100 million mark while it reached ₱170 million on its two-week run. It was shown in 200 cinemas nationwide.

== Reception ==
=== Accolades ===
Year	Award Giving Body	Recipient(s)	Award	Result
2017	15th Gawad Tanglaw	Jesse Lucas	Best Musical Scoring	Won
2017	Box Office Entertainment Awards by Guillermo Mendoza Memorial Scholarship Foundation	Dingdong Dantes	Film Best Actor of the Year	Won
2017	19th Gawad Pasado	Angelica Panganiban	Pinakapasadong Aktres	Nominated
2017	19th Gawad Pasado	Paulo Avelino	Pinakapasadong Katuwang na Aktor	Won
2017	33rd Philippine Movie Press Club (PMPC) Star Awards for Movies	Maryo J. Delos Reyes	Movie Director of the Year	Nominated
2017	33rd Philippine Movie Press Club (PMPC) Star Awards for Movies	The Unmarried Wife	Movie of the Year	Nominated
2017	33rd Philippine Movie Press Club (PMPC) Star Awards for Movies	Dingdong Dantes	Movie Actor of the Year	Nominated
2017	33rd Philippine Movie Press Club (PMPC) Star Awards for Movies	Lei Navarro	Movie Child Performer of the Year	Nominated
2017	33rd Philippine Movie Press Club (PMPC) Star Awards for Movies	Vanessa Valdez	Movie Screen Writer of the Year	Nominated
2017	33rd Philippine Movie Press Club (PMPC) Star Awards for Movies	Winston Acuyong	Movie Production Designer of the Year	Nominated
2017	33rd Philippine Movie Press Club (PMPC) Star Awards for Movies	Tara Illenberger	Movie Editor of the Year	Nominated
2017	33rd Philippine Movie Press Club (PMPC) Star Awards for Movies	Jesse Lucas	Movie Musical Scorer of the Year	Nominated
2017	33rd Philippine Movie Press Club (PMPC) Star Awards for Movies	Arnel Labayo	Movie Sound Engineer of the Year	Nominated
