= Endless Love (2010 TV series) =

2010 Philippine television drama series

- Title card
- Genre: Romantic drama
- Based on: Autumn in My Heart (2000) by Oh Soo Yun
- Written by: Denoy Navarro-Punio; Renato Custodio; Des Garbes Severino; Onay Sales
- Directed by: Mac Alejandre; Andoy Ranay
- Starring: Dingdong Dantes; Marian Rivera
- Theme music composer: Rannie Ilag (lyrics); Cecil Borja (music)
- Opening theme: "Ikaw Lang" by Rachelle Ann Go
- Country of origin: Philippines
- Original language: Tagalog
- No. of episodes: 80

Production
- Executive producer: Joseph Buncalan
- Camera setup: Multiple-camera setup
- Running time: 19–32 minutes
- Production company: GMA Entertainment TV

Original release
- Network: GMA Network
- Release: June 28 – October 15, 2010

Endless Love is a 2010 Philippine television drama romance series broadcast by GMA Network. The series is based on a 2000 South Korean television series, Autumn in My Heart. Directed by Mac Alejandre and Andoy Ranay, it stars Dingdong Dantes and Marian Rivera. It premiered on June 28, 2010 on the network's Telebabad line up. The series concluded on October 15, 2010, with a total of 80 episodes.

== Cast and characters ==
Cast

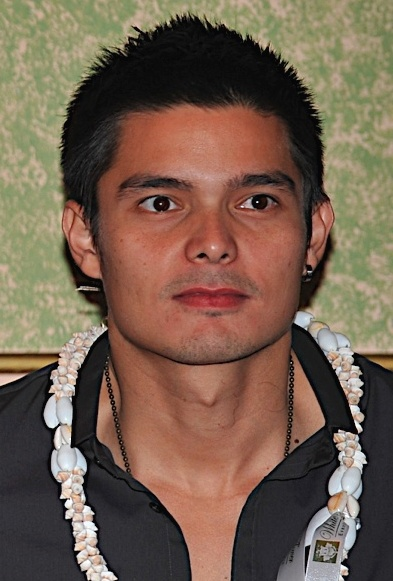
Dingdong Dantes

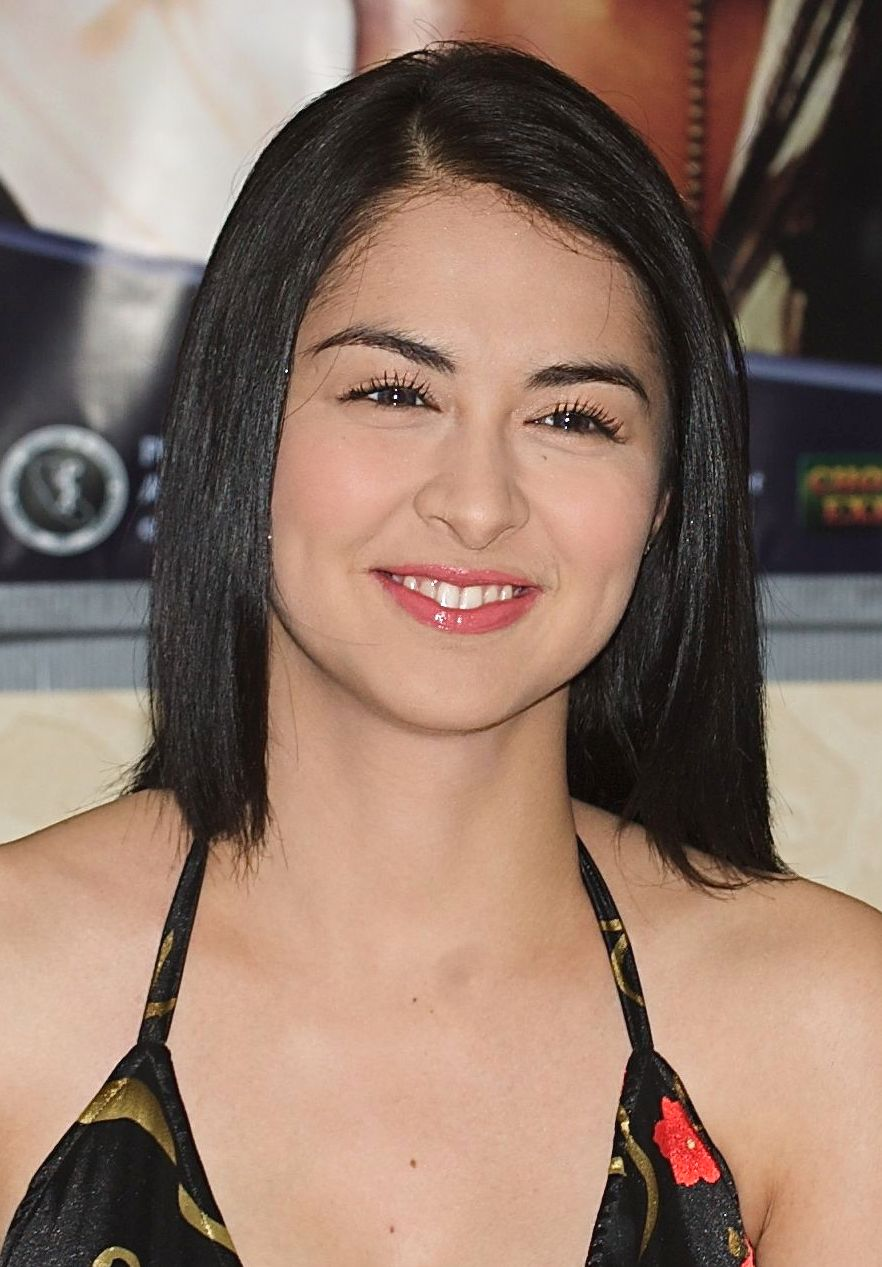
Marian Rivera

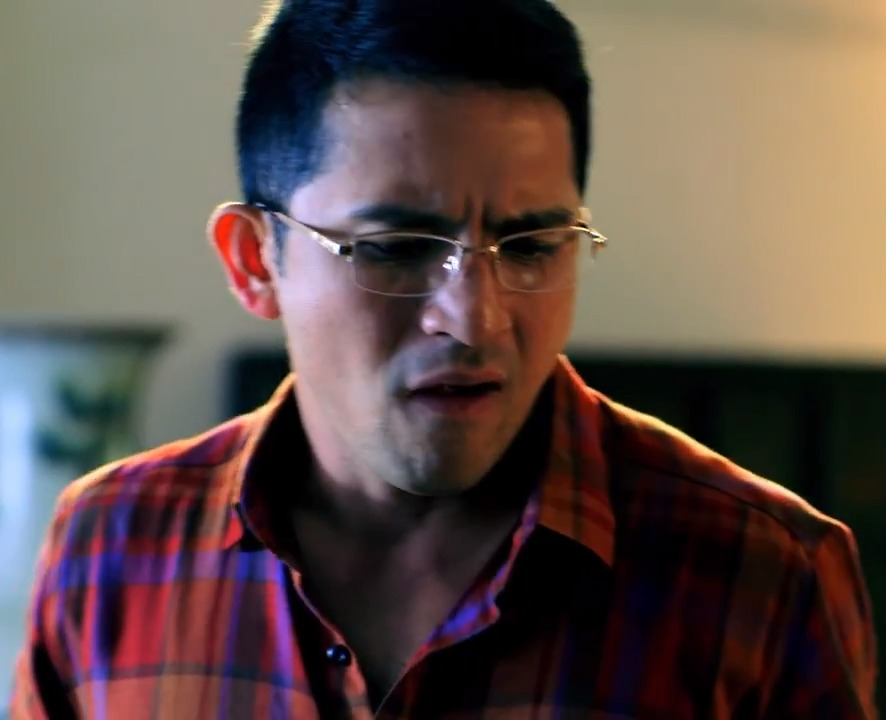
Dennis Trillo

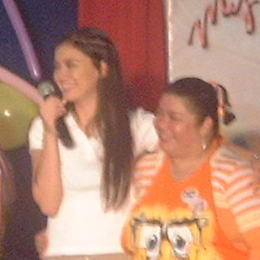
Nadine Samonte (left)

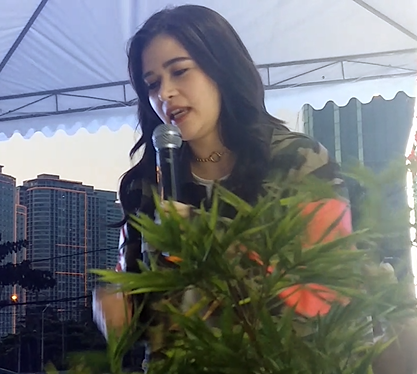
Bela Padilla

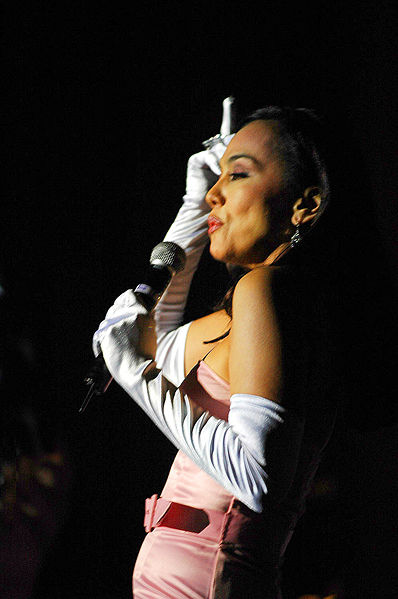
Kuh Ledesma

Lead cast

- Dingdong Dantes as Johnny Dizon
- Marian Rivera as Jenny Dizon / Jenny Cruz-Tantoco

Supporting cast

- Dennis Trillo as Andrew Tantoco
- Nadine Samonte as Shirley Cruz / Shirley Dizon
- Tirso Cruz III as Robert Dizon
- Sandy Andolong as Katherine Dizon
- Janice de Belen as Suzette "Suzy" Cruz
- Kuh Ledesma as Jackie Tantoco
- Gabby Eigenmann as Jojo Cruz
- Ces Quesada as Nora Ramirez
- Bernard Palanca as Raul Tuazon
- Marco Alcaraz as Nestor
- Mosang as Christine Santos
- Bela Padilla as Yumi Ramirez
- Janna Dominguez as Mylene Ortiz

Guest cast

- Kristoffer Martin as younger Johnny
- Lucho Ayala as younger Jojo
- Kathryn Bernardo as younger Jenny
- Joyce Ching as younger Shirley
- John Nite as a doctor

== Development ==
Endless Love is a South Korea television series by Yoon Seok-ho aired through KBS2 from September 16 to November 7, 2000. In 2003, the series was broadcast by GMA Network in the Philippines.

=== Casting ===
Ryan Agoncillo, Paulo Avelino and Hero Angeles were all considered to take on the second lead male role before Dennis Trillo was eventually cast. The production encountered delays, causing director Joyce E. Bernal to leave production and eventually replaced by Mac Alejandre; actress Gina Alajar left to pursue another role, whilst actor Christopher de Leon chose to focus on his political career in the meanwhile - both were replaced by Kuh Ledesma and Tirso Cruz III, respectively.

== Production ==
Principal photography commenced in April 2010.

== Ratings ==
According to AGB Nielsen Philippines' Mega Manila People/Individual television ratings, the pilot episode of Endless Love earned a 15.8% rating. The final episode scored a 15.1% rating.

== Accolades ==
Accolades received by Endless Love
Year	Award	Category	Recipient	Result	Ref.
2011	25th PMPC Star Awards for Television	Best Drama Actor	Dingdong Dantes	Nominated	

== Home media release ==
In 2011, the series was released on DVD by GMA Home Video.

== Controversy ==
During the filming of the series, Philippine actress Bela Padilla accused actress Marian Rivera of bullying her, and locking her inside the comfort room, due to Rivera's alleged jealousy to Padilla for working with Rivera's boyfriend-actor, Dingdong Dantes in the series. Rivera denied the accusation in October 2026.
