= My Beloved =

2012 Philippine television drama series

- Title card
- Genre: Drama; Romantic fantasy
- Created by: R.J. Nuevas
- Written by: RJ Nuevas; Des Garbes-Severino; Lobert Villela; Vinuel Ello
- Directed by: Dominic Zapata; Lore Reyes
- Creative director: Jun Lana
- Starring: Dingdong Dantes; Marian Rivera
- Theme music composer: Cecile Azarcon ("How Did You Know"); Joseph Olfindo ("Forever, My Beloved")
- Opening theme: "How Did You Know" by Mark Bautista & Rachelle Ann Go
- Ending theme: "Forever My Beloved" by Rachelle Ann Go
- Country of origin: Philippines
- Original language: Tagalog
- No. of episodes: 83

Production
- Executive producer: Mona Coles-Mayuga
- Producer: Wilma Galvante
- Production locations: Manila, Philippines; Zambales, Philippines
- Cinematography: Roman Theodossis
- Editors: Cesar Colina; Maita Dator; Amiran Juco; Jay Mendoza
- Camera setup: Multiple-camera setup
- Running time: 18–38 minutes
- Production company: GMA Entertainment TV

Original release
- Network: GMA Network
- Release: February 13 – June 8, 2012

My Beloved is a 2012 Philippine television drama romance fantasy series broadcast by GMA Network. Directed by Dominic Zapata and Lore Reyes, it stars Dingdong Dantes and Marian Rivera. It premiered on February 13, 2012 on the network's Telebabad line up. The series concluded on June 8, 2012, with a total of 83 episodes.

The series is streaming online on YouTube.

== Cast and characters ==
Cast

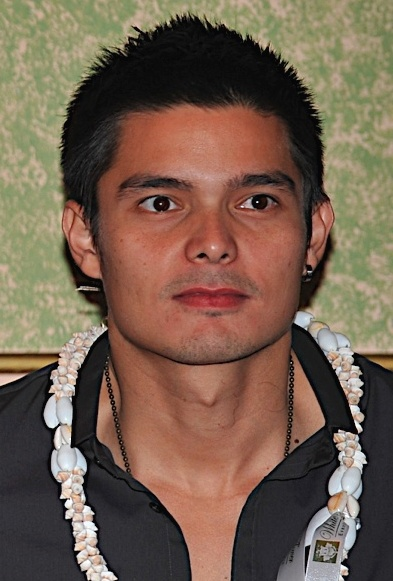
Dingdong Dantes

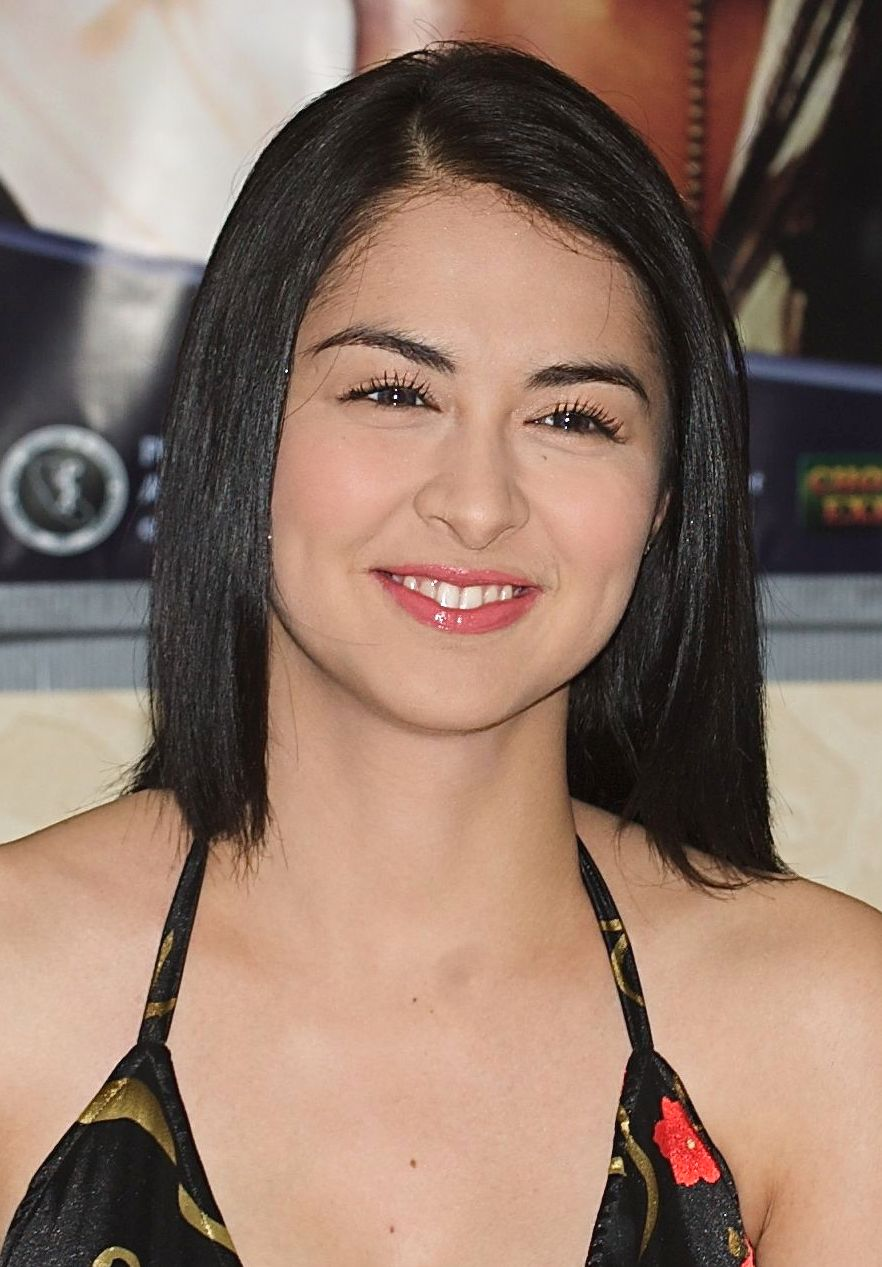
Marian Rivera

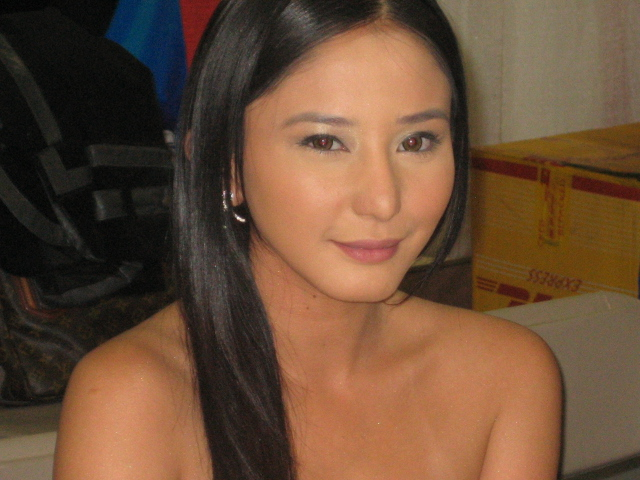
Katrina Halili

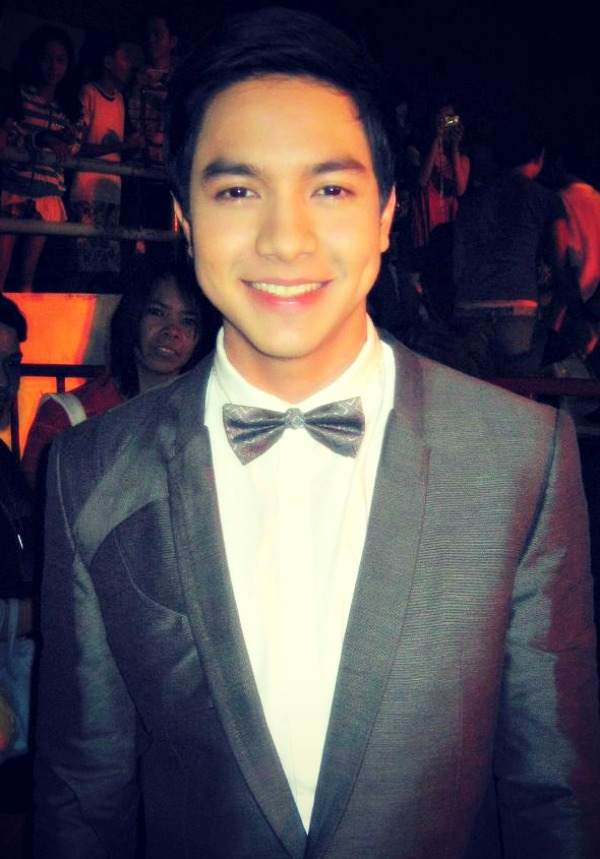
Alden Richards

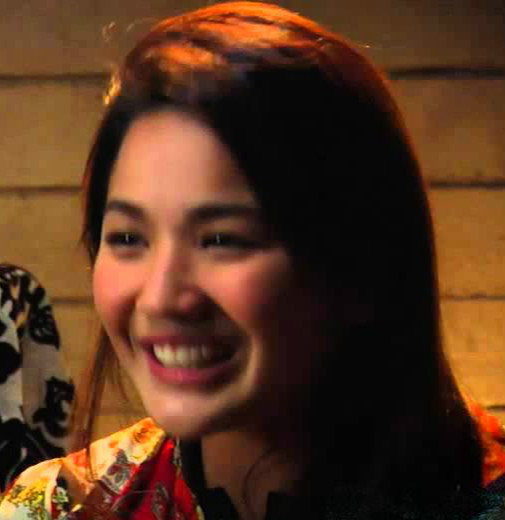
Ynna Asistio

Lead cast

- Dingdong Dantes as Benjamin "Benjie" Castor / Arlan
- Marian Rivera as Sharina Quijano-Castor

Supporting cast

- Nova Villa as Inggay Castor
- Paolo Contis as Geronimo "Gimo" Magtoto
- Katrina Halili as Emilia "Emmie" Montecastro
- Jennica Garcia as Monica Quijano
- Carl Guevara as Junic Tablante
- Mikael Daez as Nelson De Guia
- Louise delos Reyes as Grace Velasco
- Alden Richards as Rico Castor
- Ynna Asistio as Lyzette
- Saab Magalona as Ginella Quijano
- Marky Lopez as Tikyo
- Djanin Cruz as Lucy
- Andrea Torres as Dessa
- Chanda Romero as Elsa Quijano
- John Hall as Joryl
- Fabio Ide as Rowan
- Jay Gonzaga as Mikal

Recurring cast

- Gianna Cutler as Pepay
- Jestoni Alarcon as Archangel
- Frank Magalona as Ronald
- Reika Suzuki / Veyda Inoval as Sunshine

Guest cast

- John Arcilla as Romeo Quijano
- Sharmaine Arnaiz as Perla Quijano-Castor
- Rio Locsin as Lily
- Gwen Zamora as younger Lily
- James Ronald Obeso as Michael
- Rodfil Obeso as Jackson
- Nathalie Hart as Trixie Montemayor
- Cris Villanueva as Crisanto Castor
- Janine Gutierrez as Joanne Ledesma
- Mel Kimura as a manager
- RJ Padilla as Tisoy
- Yassi Pressman as teenage Joy
- Ryza Cenon as teenage Pepay
- Hiro Magalona as Erwin
- Boots Anson-Roa as older Sharina
- Tanya Garcia as older Joy

== Casting ==
Actress Rhian Ramos was initially cast for the lead role, and later left due to "personal" reasons. On December 16, 2011, actress Marian Rivera was hired as Ramos' replacement.

== Ratings ==
According to AGB Nielsen Philippines' Mega Manila household television ratings, the pilot episode of My Beloved earned a 30.3% rating. The final episode scored a 26.1% rating.

== Accolades ==
Accolades received by My Beloved
Year	Award	Category	Recipient	Result	Ref.
2012	26th PMPC Star Awards for Television	Best Drama Actor	Dingdong Dantes	Nominated	
2012	FMTM Awards	TV series Loveteam of the Year	Dingdong Dantes, Marian Rivera	Nominated	
2013	10th Golden Screen TV Awards	Outstanding Performance by an Actor in a Drama Series	Dingdong Dantes	Nominated	
