= Seven Sundays (2017 film) =

2017 family comedy-drama film by Cathy Garcia-Molina

- Theatrical release poster
- Directed by: Cathy Garcia-Molina
- Screenplay by: Roumella Monge; Kiko Abrillo; John Raphael Gonzaga
- Story by: Vanessa R. Valdez; Roumella Monge; Kiko Abrillo
- Produced by: Elma S. Medua
- Starring: Ronaldo Valdez; Dingdong Dantes; Cristine Reyes; Enrique Gil; Aga Muhlach
- Cinematography: Theo Lozada
- Edited by: Marya Ignacio
- Music by: Jessie Q. Lasaten
- Production company: Star Cinema
- Distributed by: ABS-CBN Film Productions
- Release date: October 11, 2017
- Running time: 128 minutes
- Language: Filipino
- Box office: ₱271 million

Seven Sundays (stylized in all lowercase) is a 2017 Philippine family comedy-drama film directed by Cathy Garcia-Molina and written by Roumella Monge, Kiko Abrillo, and John Raphael Gonzaga from a story developed by Abrillo, Monge, and Vanessa R. Valdez. Starring Aga Muhlach, Ronaldo Valdez, Cristine Reyes, Dingdong Dantes, and Enrique Gil, the story follows four siblings who discovered that their father has lung cancer and before time is running out, they have to settle every problem faced by the family.

Produced and distributed by ABS-CBN Film Productions, the film was theatrically released on October 11, 2017, and received praise from both critics and audiences and became the seventh highest-grossing Philippine film of 2017. It also marks Muhlach's return since Of All The Things in 2012.

== Plot ==
Manuel Bonifacio is a widowed former barangay captain and overseas Filipino worker who lives with his nephew Jun. On his birthday, he is greeted by the townsfolk and his children (through greeting cards). However, late in the evening, he receives the news from his doctor that he has lung cancer and has only two months to live. Manuel's children arrive at their old household and vote to discuss the matter. They decide to visit him for seven Sundays in spite of their own problems. Allan competed with a rival business owner named Mr. Kim. Bryan wanted to meet a woman named Juliana Smith. Charmaine struggled with her husband Jerry's infidelity. Dexter is on the run after a botched concert event.

While out buying prepaid phone credits, Dexter meets his old friend, goes to Allan's store, and realizes that he faces financial issues. The next day, the siblings decide to host a birthday party for their father after not showing up to his birthday. They ask Jun to stall their father to buy some time, but Manuel catches up. Allan and Bryan argue in the middle of a game, involving the rest and the process, and causing their father to bring out knives to stop the fighting. Jun asks his cousins to get along, even if they have to pretend. The next day, the siblings pretended to get along but could not agree on how to bring their father to the funeral parlor. He tells them to prepare a eulogy in advance, causing an awkward moment.

While at the family household, Bryan, Charmaine, and Dexter talk about their past. Manuel receives a call from the doctor that he was misdiagnosed and that he simply had tuberculosis. Manuel does not disclose the news to his children, fearing that they will abandon him again. Next Sunday, the family goes to the beach. Manuel shows an unusual amount of vigor, causing his children to be suspicious of his true medical condition. Manuel shows his family a game where he picks out a letter from the old Rebisco can, and the siblings have to guess who wrote the letter. They realize how distant they have become over the years.

Dexter stays with his father and buys ice cream together at Allan's store. They realize his financial situation while confronting Mr. Kim. While eating, Dexter sees Charmaine's husband and a college student flirting with each other, causing Dex to hit Jerry. Manuel calls Bryan to help Allan regarding his financial situation. In response to the favor, Allan helps Bryan open up about the woman he is after, who turned out to be the mother of his illegitimate child. After a checkup, Allan realizes the truth about Manuel's illness and confronts him. One evening, as the family prepares for dinner, Dexter confronts Charmaine about hitting her husband and overhears the conversation about Manuel's condition. Bryan gets a call about what Dexter allegedly did during the botched concert, causing him to confront Dexter. Because of this, the siblings fight and leave.

The next day, Charmaine evicts her husband, Allan returns to his store, Dexter returns to his old room, and Bryan receives a message from the woman. Allan makes amends to Bryan and finds the other siblings. They then go to the cemetery where their late mother is buried. They see their father talking to her grave, lamenting about how he felt like a failure in being a father. The siblings say their promised eulogy to their still-living father and make a loving embrace. The movie ends with Allan's store being relaunched successfully, with Mr. Kim's brother unsuccessfully trying to invite people to his groundbreaking event.

== Cast ==
=== Main cast ===
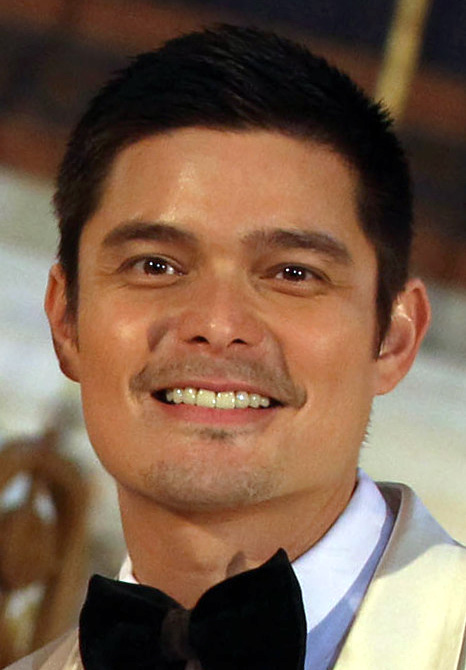
Dingdong Dantes portrays Bryan "Bry" A. Bonifacio.

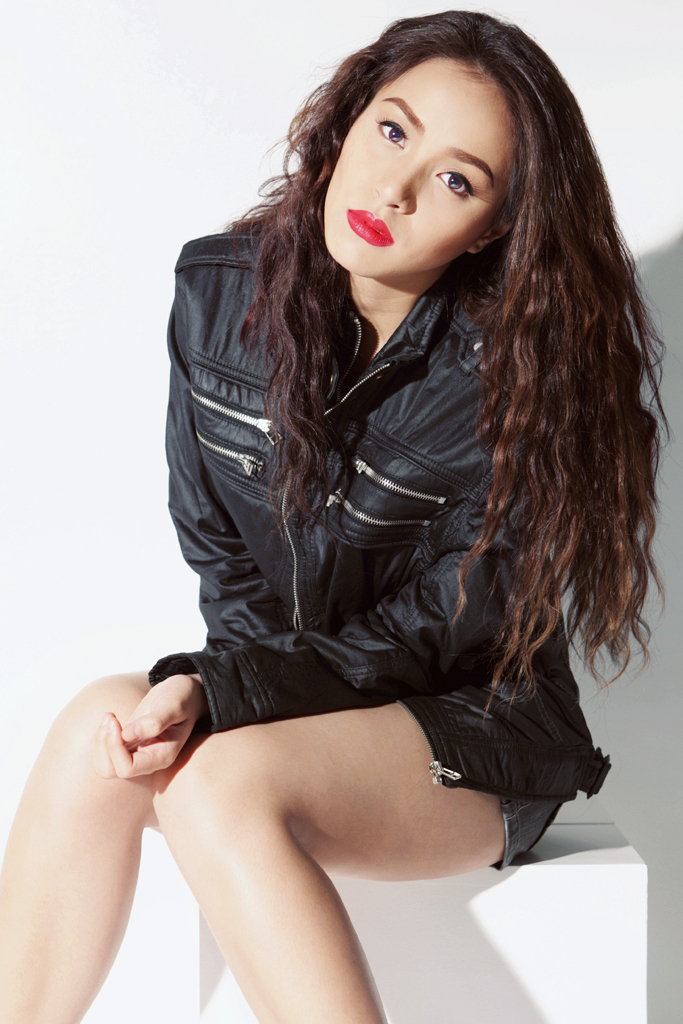
Cristine Reyes portrays Charmaine "Cha" A. Bonifacio.

- Ronaldo Valdez as Capt. Manuel Bonifacio: The family patriarch, he invited his children for seven Sundays as he initially thought that he would die of lung cancer.
- Aga Muhlach as Allan A. Bonifacio: The firstborn of the family, he manages the ABC's Family Store, a family business founded by his father. He faces the issue of his business being threatened by Mr. Kim, an enterprising businessman.
- Dingdong Dantes as Bryan "Bry" A. Bonifacio: The breadwinner of the family. He is a successful business manager and a Certified Public Accountant; however, he faced the issue of being apparently exploited by his own family members, and wanted to meet his own biological son.
- Cristine Reyes as Charmaine "Cha" A. Bonifacio: The only daughter of the family. She inherited many of her late mother's traits, such as her cooking skills as exemplified in cooking Pancit Bihon and playing piano music. She faced the issue of dealing with her cheating husband.
- Enrique Gil as Dexter "Dex / Baby D" A. Bonifacio: The youngest in the family. He worked as a disc jockey; however, he was on the run from people, especially after the concert he was involved in failed massively.

=== Supporting cast ===
- Ketchup Eusebio as Jun: The nephew of Capt. Manuel and the cousin of Allan, Bry, Cha, and Dex.
- Kyle Echarri as Marc Bonifacio: Allan's son who idolizes his uncle Bry.
- Donita Rose as Bechay Bonifacio: Allan's loving wife who is pregnant with another child.
- Kean Cipriano as Jerry: Cha's husband who cheated on her multiple times.
- Kakai Bautista as Baby: Bry's secretary who has a one-sided relationship with him.
- Charlie Dizon (Note: Credited as April Matienzo.) as Camille: Dex's old friend.
- Jeffrey Tam as Mr. Kim: The rival business owner to Allan, who threatened to buy the family store multiple times.
- Kin Billote as Kath
- Angelica Cruz as Leila
- Angelee Cruz as Sofia
- Gabriel Iribagon as Zac
- Alyanna Angeles as Yna
- Menggie Cobarrubias as Dr. Nelson: The Bonifacio family's doctor who initially diagnosed Capt. Manuel has lung cancer.

=== Cameo appearances ===
- Bela Padilla as Marie A. Bonifacio
- Iza Calzado as Juliana Smith: Gian's biological mother.
- Edward Barber as Gian S. Bonifacio: Bry's 19-year-old biological son.
- Ryan Bang as Mr. Kim's younger brother

== Reception ==
=== Critical response ===
Oggs Cruz, writing for Rappler, praised the story and the acting performances of the cast, particularly Ronaldo Valdez playing the patriarch, but criticized some scenes and dialogues where it became a softer version of the director's previous works.

=== Accolades ===
Year	Award-giving body	Recipient(s)	Award	Result	Ref.
2018	Asia-Pacific Tambuli Awards	Seven Sundays	Cinema for Good	Won	
2018	40th Catholic Mass Media Awards	Seven Sundays	Best Film (Student's Choice)	Won	
2018	49th GMMSF Box-Office Entertainment Awards	Aga Muhlach	Film Actor of the Year	Won	
2018	49th GMMSF Box-Office Entertainment Awards	Dingdong Dantes	Film Actor of the Year	Won	
2018	49th GMMSF Box-Office Entertainment Awards	Cristine Reyes	Movie Supporting Actress of the Year	Won	
2018	66th FAMAS Awards	Aga Muhlach	Best Supporting Actor	Nominated	
2018	66th FAMAS Awards	Cristine Reyes	Best Supporting Actress	Nominated	
2018	36th Luna Awards	Aga Muhlach	Best Actor	Won	
2018	36th Luna Awards	Cristine Reyes	Best Supporting Actress	Nominated	
2018	36th Luna Awards	Roumella Monge, Kiko Abrillo, John Raphael Gonzaga	Best Screenplay	Won	
2018	36th Luna Awards	Marya Ignacio	Best Editing	Won	
2018	34th PMPC Star Award for Movies	Seven Sundays	Movie of the Year	Nominated	
2018	34th PMPC Star Award for Movies	Cathy Garcia-Molina	Movie Director of the Year	Nominated	
2018	34th PMPC Star Award for Movies	Dingdong Dantes	Movie Actor of the Year	Nominated	
2018	34th PMPC Star Award for Movies	Aga Muhlach	Movie Actor of the Year	Nominated	
2018	34th PMPC Star Award for Movies	Enrique Gil	Movie Supporting Actor of the Year	Nominated	
2018	34th PMPC Star Award for Movies	Kyle Echarri	New Movie Actor of the Year	Nominated	
2018	34th PMPC Star Award for Movies	Melai Monge, Kiko Abrillo, John Raphael Gonzaga	Movie Screenwriter of the Year	Nominated	
2018	34th PMPC Star Award for Movies	Theo Lozada	Movie Cinematographer of the Year	Nominated	
2018	34th PMPC Star Award for Movies	Marya Ignacio	Movie Editor of the Year	Nominated	
2018	The EDDYS	Aga Muhlach	Best Actor	Won	
2018	The EDDYS	Enrique Gil	Best Supporting Actor	Nominated	
