= Amazing Earth =

Philippine television infotainment show

- Title card since 2025
- Genre: Infotainment
- Presented by: Dingdong Dantes
- Country of origin: Philippines
- Original language: Tagalog

Production
- Camera setup: Multiple-camera setup
- Running time: 45 minutes
- Production company: GMA Entertainment Group

Original release
- Network: GMA Network
- Release: June 17, 2018 – present

Amazing Earth is a Philippine television infotainment show broadcast by GMA Network. Hosted by Dingdong Dantes, it premiered on June 17, 2018, on the network's Sunday Grande sa Gabi line up.

== Production ==
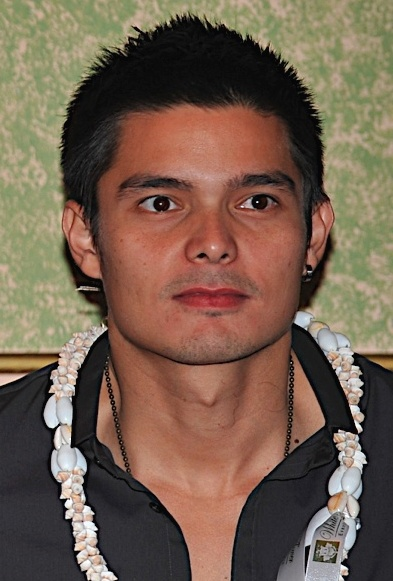
Dingdong Dantes serves as the host.

In March 2020, production was halted due to the enhanced community quarantine in Luzon caused by the COVID-19 pandemic. Production resumed in July 2020. The show resumed its programming on July 26, 2020.

== Ratings ==
According to AGB Nielsen Philippines' Nationwide Urban Television Audience Measurement People in television homes, the pilot episode of Amazing Earth earned a 19.3% rating.

== Accolades ==
Accolades received by Amazing Earth
Year	Award	Category	Recipient	Result	Ref.
2018	32nd PMPC Star Awards for Television	Best Educational Program Host	Dingdong Dantes	Nominated	
2019	Anak TV Seal Awards		Amazing Earth	Won	
2019	33rd PMPC Star Awards for Television	Best Educational Program Host	Dingdong Dantes	Nominated	
2021	34th PMPC Star Awards for Television	Best Educational Program Host	Dingdong Dantes	Won	
2024	6th Gawad Lasallianeta	Most Outstanding Educational Show	Amazing Earth	Won	
2024	6th Gawad Lasallianeta	Most Outstanding Educational Show Host	Dingdong Dantes	Won	
2025	36th PMPC Star Awards for Television	Best Educational Program Host	Dingdong Dantes	Pending	
