= Tanya Garcia =

Filipino actress (born 1981)

Tanya Garcia-Lapid
- Born: Tanya Katherine Rosales Lyttle; August 5, 1981 (age 44); Manila, Philippines
- Occupation: Actress
- Years active: 1996–present
- Spouse: Mark Lapid (m. 2010)
- Children: 3
- Relatives: Jericho Rosales (cousin)

Tanya Katherine Rosales Lyttle-Lapid (born August 5, 1981), known professionally as Tanya Garcia (Tagalog: [ˈtɐnjɐ gaɾˈsɪa]), is a Filipino actress. She became a household name after playing Cecilia in one of the longest running soap operas of GMA Network, Sana ay Ikaw na Nga, opposite Dingdong Dantes. In 2015 she moved back to her home network ABS-CBN. During the year 2020, she returned to GMA Network.

== Career ==
Garcia's showbiz career started when she was introduced as one of the teen stars of Star Circle Batch 5 on ABS-CBN. She appeared in youth-oriented shows like Gimik (where she was first paired with Patrick Garcia) and played a supporting role in Esperanza as the sister of the titular heroine, portrayed by Judy Ann Santos.

She took a break from her showbiz career for a while and concentrated on her studies. She took up mass communication at Dominican College in San Juan when she was signed by Viva Films and later on appeared in the Viva Television afternoon drama Anna Karenina as Grace opposite Dingdong Dantes. She also had a cameo role in the TV drama Ikaw Lang ang Mamahalin.

Her rise to fame started when she played the role of Cecilia in the drama telebabad show Sana ay Ikaw na Nga with Dingdong Dantes, Bobby Andrews and Angelu de Leon. On the later part of the soap, she also played the role of Olga, the antagonist of Cecilia, which was played again by Maricar de Mesa.

After her stint at that show, she was reunited with onscreen partner Dingdong Dantes at the light dramedy Twin Hearts as Althea, a heart operation survivor who fell in love with the ex-boyfriend of the heart donor. She was also paired with Dennis Trillo.

Garcia did a religious-theme show in QTV called Noel where she was paired with James Blanco and Paolo Contis. She was then later on paired with Ogie Alcasid in the family-oriented TV show Ay Robot! again with QTV. Tanya also appeared in Agos, the third season of Now and Forever, in which she played Sophia, a young liberated lawyer who eventually falls in love with her brother (played by Dennis Trillo). She also had a cameo role in the show Makita Ka Lang Muli as the young Celia Rodriguez.

Garcia also starred in numerous movies. She played the role of a possessed man's wife in Kulimlim with Robin Padilla as her leading man in 2004. Some of her movie credits are Shake, Rattle and Roll 2k5, Filipinas and Batas Militar.

After a hiatus from telebabad series, Garcia returned as a supporting cast member in the GMA Network show Super Twins, playing Aloya Blossom alongside Jennylyn Mercado, Nadine Samonte, and Dennis Trillo.

After four years of hiatus due to Tanya's pregnancy (twice), she inked a two-year contract with Viva Management for TV and movie projects last June 6, 2011. She plays the role of Lilian Avelino-Fuentebella in the remake of Ikaw Lang ang Mamahalin.

In 2015, Garcia moved back to her home network ABS-CBN. She had a guest stint on the longest running drama anthology of the network Maalaala Mo Kaya with Yves Flores as a 30 and 15 year old lovers. She is currently on the hit teleserye Ningning as Mak-Mak's mother Alicia.

After being a Kapamilya, Garcia made her Kapuso comeback and appeared in GMA-7's Babawiin Ko ang Lahat, with Pauline Mendoza, John Estrada and Carmina Villarroel.

== Personal life ==
Garcia has three daughters namely Mischa Amidala, Matilda Anika, and Madeleine Ariana with her husband, former Pampanga Governor Mark Lapid, son of former Pampanga Governor and Senator Lito Lapid. They reside at Poblacion, Porac.

== Filmography ==
=== Film ===
| Year | Title | Role | Notes |
|---|---|---|---|
| 1998 | Haba-Baba-Doo! Puti-Puti-Poo! | Angelika | |
| 1999 | Esperanza: The Movie | Andrea Estrera | |
| 1999 | Tik Tak Toys, My Kolokotoys | Donita | |
| 2002 | Jeannie, Bakit Ngayon Ka Lang | Emma | |
| 2002 | Ikaw Lamang Hanggang Ngayon | Anna | |
| 2003 | Filipinas | Dindi | |
| 2004 | Kulimlim | Hannah Cabrera | |
| 2005 | Shake, Rattle & Roll 2k5 | Rene's wife | "Ang Lihim ng San Joaquin" segment |
| 2006 | Nasaan si Francis? | Sofia | |
| 2006 | Batas Militar | Lt. Christine Castro | |
| 2006 | Matakot Ka sa Karma | The Ghost | "Kama" segment |
| 2024 | Sunny | Janet | |

=== Television ===
| Year | Title | Role |
|---|---|---|
| 1996 | Gimik | Angela |
| 1997–1999 | Esperanza | Andrea Estrera |
| 1997 | Mikee | Various |
| 1998 | Wansapanataym: Chemistry | |
| 1998 | Lihim ng Gabi | Various |
| 1998 | Dear Mikee | Various |
| 1999–2000 | Labs Ko Si Babe | Alicia |
| 2000 | Katapat: Mayor Fred Lim: Ang Huling Alma ni Alma | Alma Buenafe |
| 2000–2002 | Anna Karenina | Anna Karenina "Grace" San Victores |
| 2000 | Campus Romance | Various |
| 2000 | GMA Telecine Specials | Various |
| 2000 | GMA Love Stories | Various |
| 2001 | Ikaw Lang ang Mamahalin | Jessica |
| 2001–2003 | Sana ay Ikaw na Nga | Cecilia Fulgencio / Margarita Zalameda |
| 2003–2004 | Twin Hearts | Althea Fontanilla |
| 2004 | Mulawin | Paloma |
| 2005 | Maynila | Various |
| 2005 | Baywalk | Various |
| 2005–2006 | Now and Forever: Agos | Sophia |
| 2006 | Noel | Nanette |
| 2006 | Makita Ka Lang Muli | Young Olmypia |
| 2007 | Super Twins | Aloya Blossom |
| 2011 | Amaya | Pandaki |
| 2011 | Rod Santiago's The Sisters | Georgia |
| 2011–2012 | Ikaw Lang ang Mamahalin | Lilian Avelino-Fuentebella |
| 2012 | My Beloved | Adult Joy Castor |
| 2012 | Sana ay Ikaw na Nga | Joanna Altamonte |
| 2012–2013 | Paroa: Ang Kuwento ni Mariposa | Aurora |
| 2013–2014 | Villa Quintana | Amparing Mangaron |
| 2014 | Strawberry Lane | Myrna Javier |
| 2015 | Maalaala Mo Kaya: Computer Shop | Ruby Maranan |
| 2015–2016 | Ningning | Alicia "Mama Isha" Demetion-Bautista |
| 2017 | ASAP | Herself |
| 2017 | La Luna Sangre | Rica "Fall" Sison-Toralba |
| 2018 | Asintado | Criselda Gaspar-Ramirez |
| 2018 | The Blood Sisters | Brenda Ortega-Solomon |
| 2018 | Maynila: Munting Hiling | Evelyn |
| 2021 | Babawiin Ko ang Lahat | Christine Allegre-Salvador |
| 2022–2023 | Mano Po Legacy: The Flower Sisters | Marilou Ong |
| 2023 | Maria Clara at Ibarra | Doña Pía Alba |
