= Ang Babaeng Hinugot sa Aking Tadyang =

2009 Philippine television drama series

- Title card
- Also known as: Dangerous Love
- Genre: Drama thriller
- Based on: Ang Babaeng Hinugot sa Aking Tadyang by Carlo J. Caparas
- Developed by: R.J. Nuevas
- Directed by: Joyce E. Bernal; Topel Lee
- Starring: Dingdong Dantes; Marian Rivera
- Theme music composer: Ogie Alcasid
- Opening theme: "Ikaw ang Pag-ibig Ko" by La Diva
- Country of origin: Philippines
- Original language: Tagalog
- No. of episodes: 63

Production
- Executive producer: Winnie Hollis Reyes
- Camera setup: Multiple-camera setup
- Running time: 30–45 minutes
- Production company: GMA Entertainment TV

Original release
- Network: GMA Network
- Release: February 2 – May 1, 2009

Ang Babaeng Hinugot sa Aking Tadyang (transl. the girl pulled from my rib / international title: Dangerous Love) is a 2009 Philippine television drama thriller series broadcast by GMA Network. The series is an adaptation of Carlo J. Caparas' graphic novel. Directed by Joyce E. Bernal and Topel Lee, it stars Dingdong Dantes and Marian Rivera. It premiered on February 2, 2009 on the network's Telebabad line up. The series concluded on May 1, 2009, with a total of 63 episodes.

The series was released on DVD by GMA Records.

== Cast and characters ==
Cast

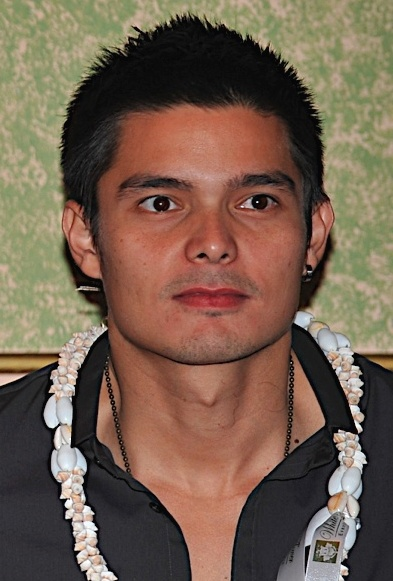
Dingdong Dantes

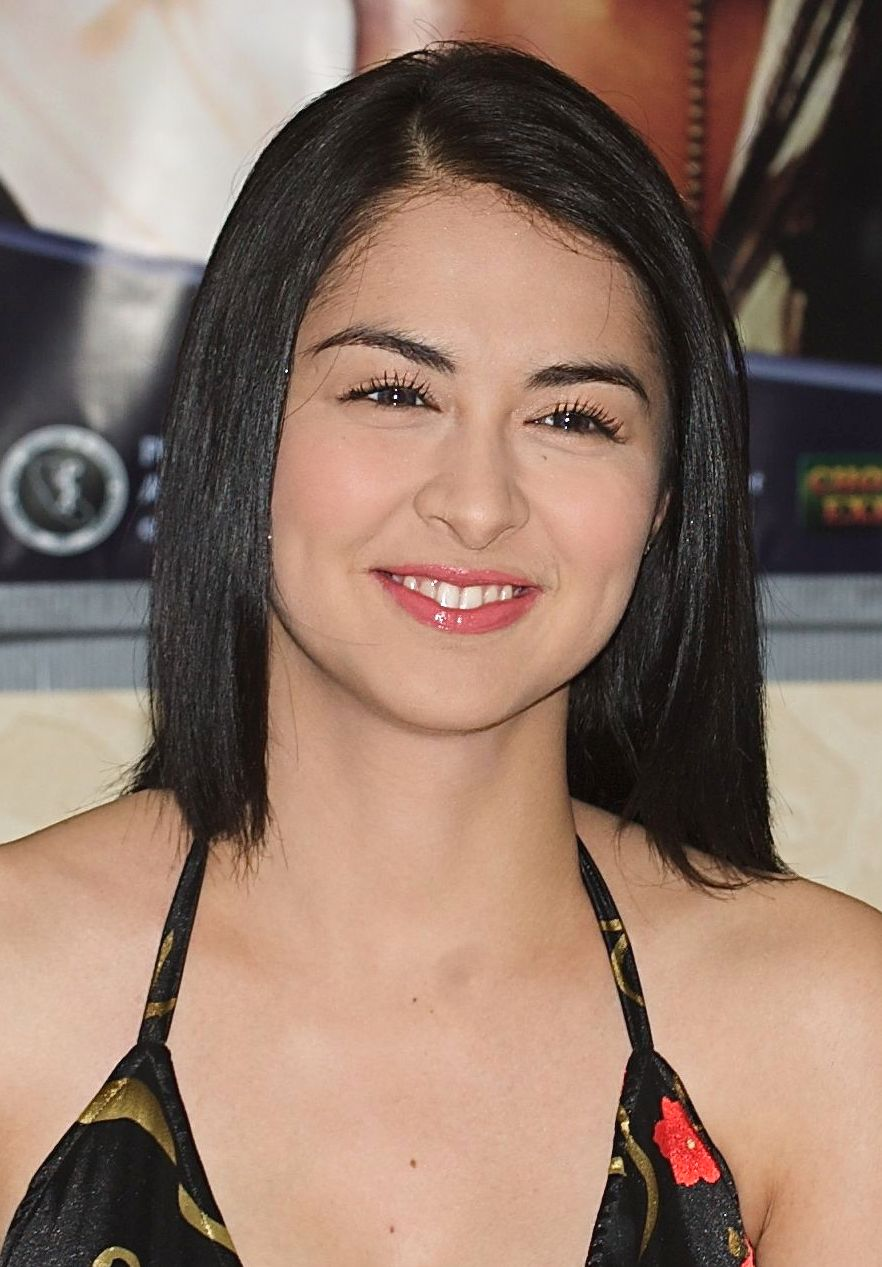
Marian Rivera

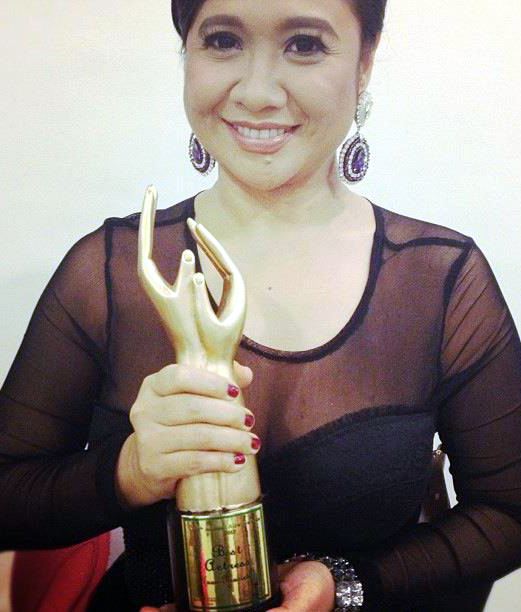
Eugene Domingo

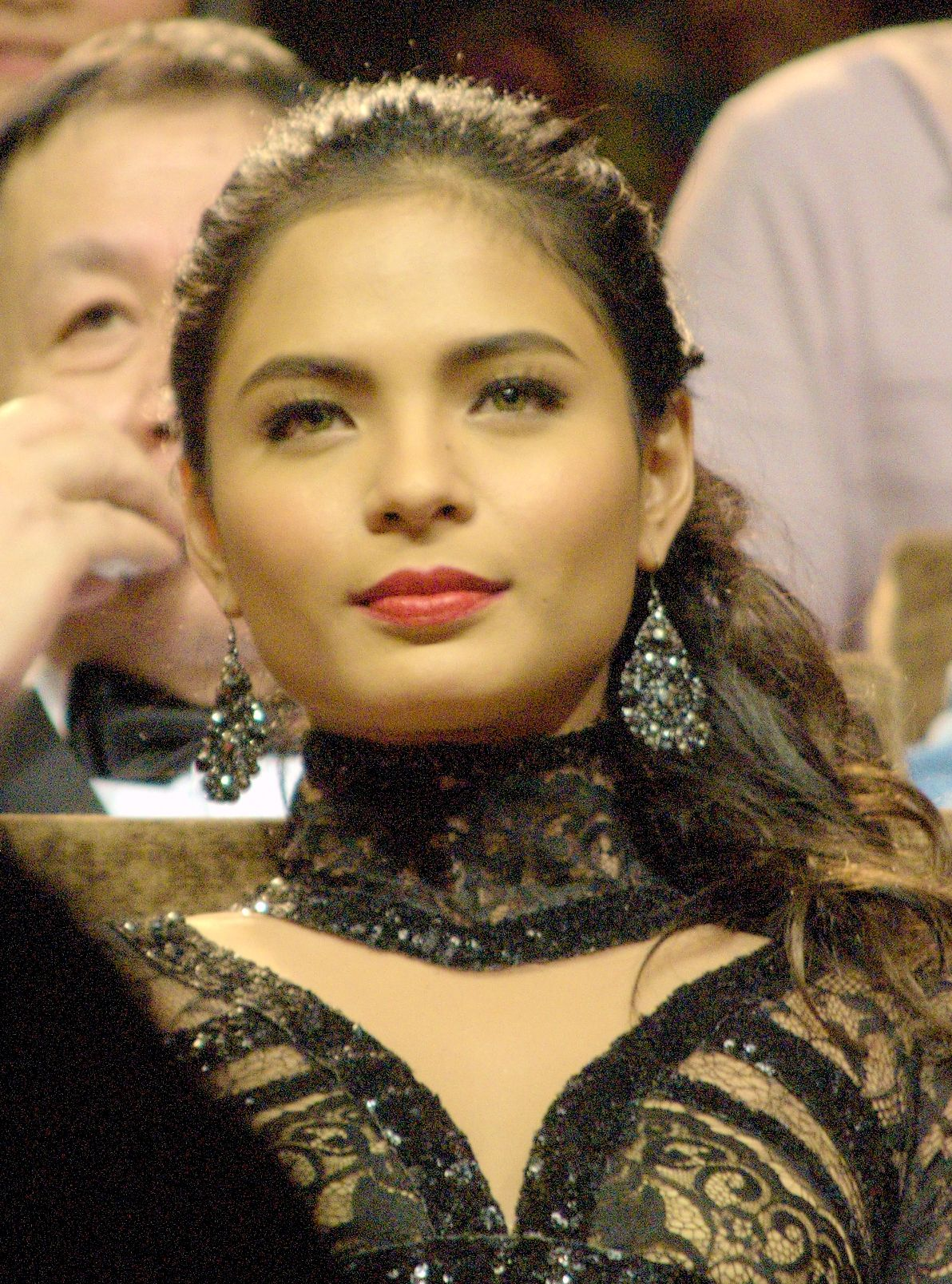
Lovi Poe

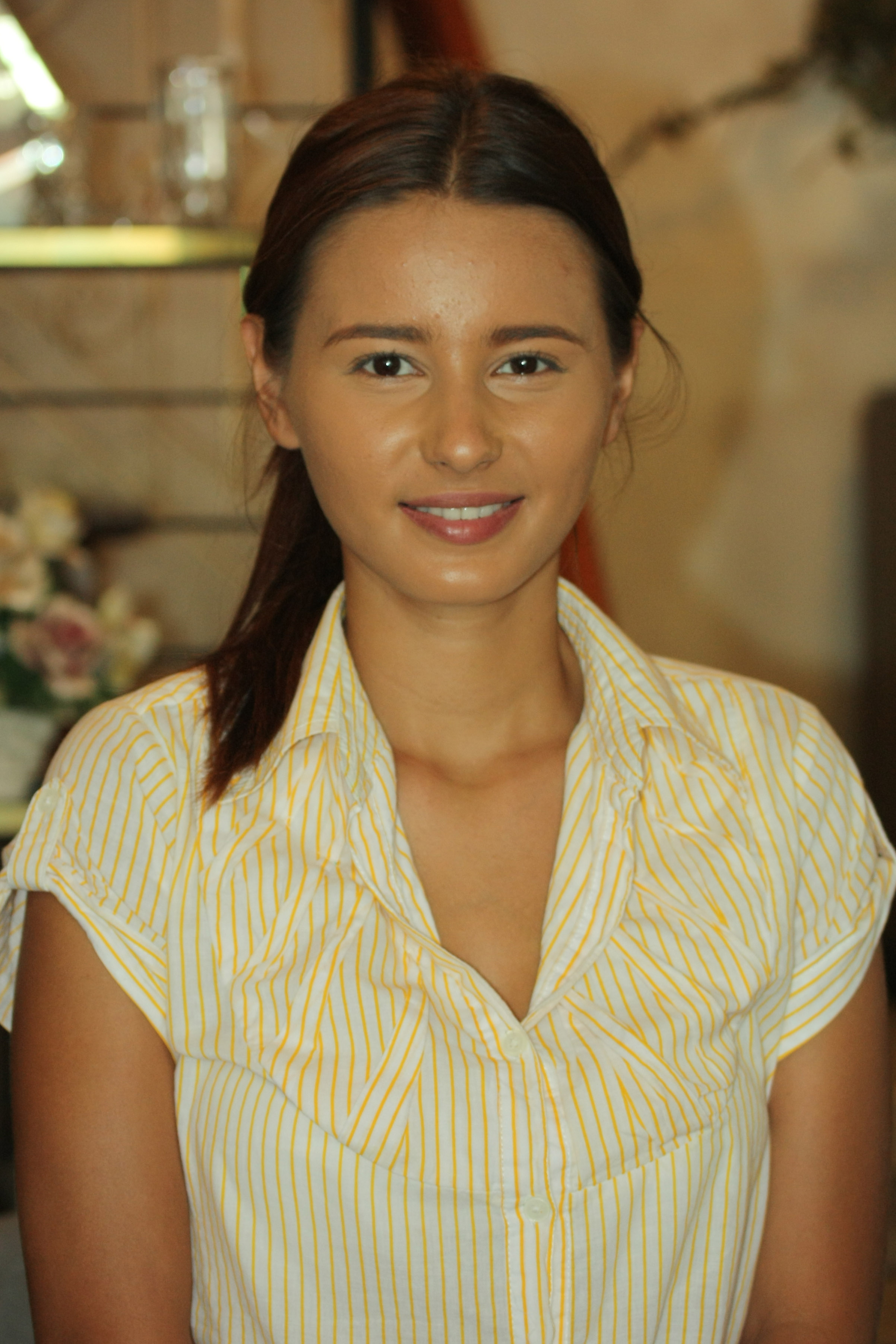
Jackie Rice

Lead cast

- Dingdong Dantes as Homer Alcaraz
- Marian Rivera as Proserfina J. Valdez-Alcaraz

Supporting cast

- Angelu de Leon as Heleen Barrientos
- Paolo Contis as Conrado "Rado" Barrientos
- Eugene Domingo as Madeline "Madel" Morales
- Carmi Martin as Hera Alcaraz
- Francine Prieto as Sheila Velasco
- Sherilyn Reyes as Galatea Alcaraz
- Lovi Poe as Athena Cruz
- Mart Escudero as Ulysses Valdez
- Jackie Rice as Cassandra Alcaraz
- Prince Stefan as Aristotle "Aris" Alcaraz
- Alyssa Alano as Citas Villareal
- Carlene Aguilar as Clarisse Morales
- Paolo Paraiso as Mike Villareal
- Celia Rodriguez as Laurenna Alcaraz

Recurring cast

- Joanne Quintas as Sylvia Torres
- Kiel Rodriguez as Ruel Alcaraz

Guest cast

- Ricardo Cepeda as Vito Valdez
- Freddie Webb as Apollo Alcaraz
- Lorenz Tan as Achilles Valdez
- Ryan Eigenmann as Enrico dela Cruz
- Jace Flores as Anton Torres
- Glydel Mercado as Celina Valdez

== Production ==
Principal photography commenced on January 6, 2009. Filming concluded on April 20, 2009.

== Ratings ==
According to AGB Nielsen Philippines' Mega Manila household television ratings, the pilot episode of Ang Babaeng Hinugot sa Aking Tadyang earned a 30.1% rating. The final episode scored a 32% rating.
