= Atlantika =

Philippine television drama series

- Title card
- Genre: Fantasy drama
- Written by: Renato Custodio Jr.; Kit Villanueva-Langit; Dode Cruz; Denoy Navarro-Punio; Adrian Ho
- Directed by: Mark A. Reyes; Zoren Legaspi
- Starring: Dingdong Dantes
- Theme music composer: Jun Lana; Chi Datu; Allan Feliciano
- Opening theme: "Maghihintay Ako" by Regine Velasquez
- Country of origin: Philippines
- Original language: Tagalog
- No. of episodes: 95 + 1 special

Production
- Executive producer: Winnie Hollis Reyes
- Camera setup: Multiple-camera setup
- Running time: 21–42 minutes
- Production company: GMA Entertainment TV

Original release
- Network: GMA Network
- Release: October 2, 2006 – February 9, 2007

Atlantika is a Philippine television drama fantasy series broadcast by GMA Network. Directed by Mark A. Reyes and Zoren Legaspi, it stars Dingdong Dantes. It premiered on October 2, 2006 on the network's Telebabad line up. The series concluded on February 9, 2007, with a total of 95 episodes.

A special, Atlantika: Ang Lihim ng Karagatan (transl. Atlantika: the secret of the sea) was aired on October 1, 2006. The series is streaming online on YouTube.

== Cast and characters ==
Cast

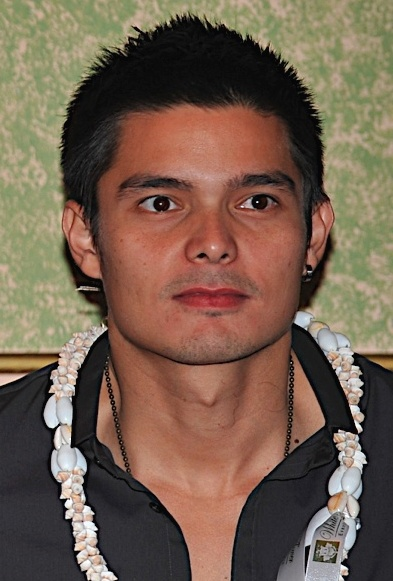
Dingdong Dantes

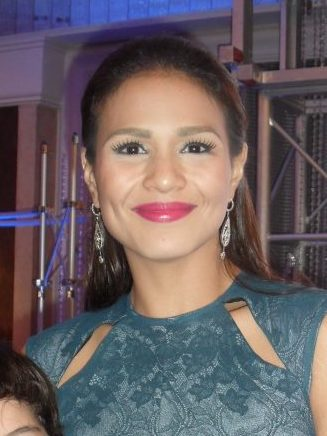
Iza Calzado

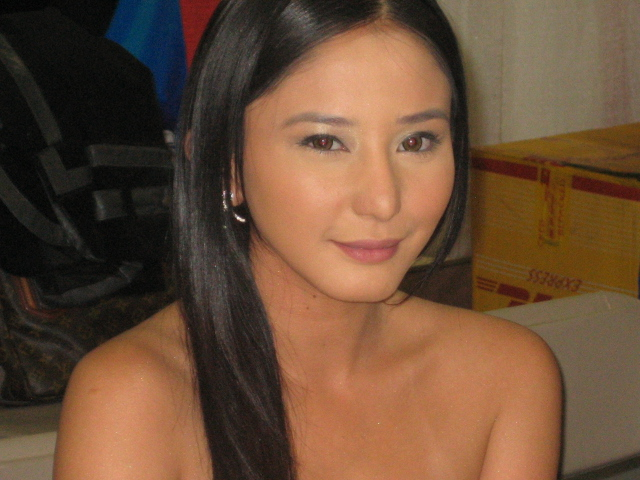
Katrina Halili

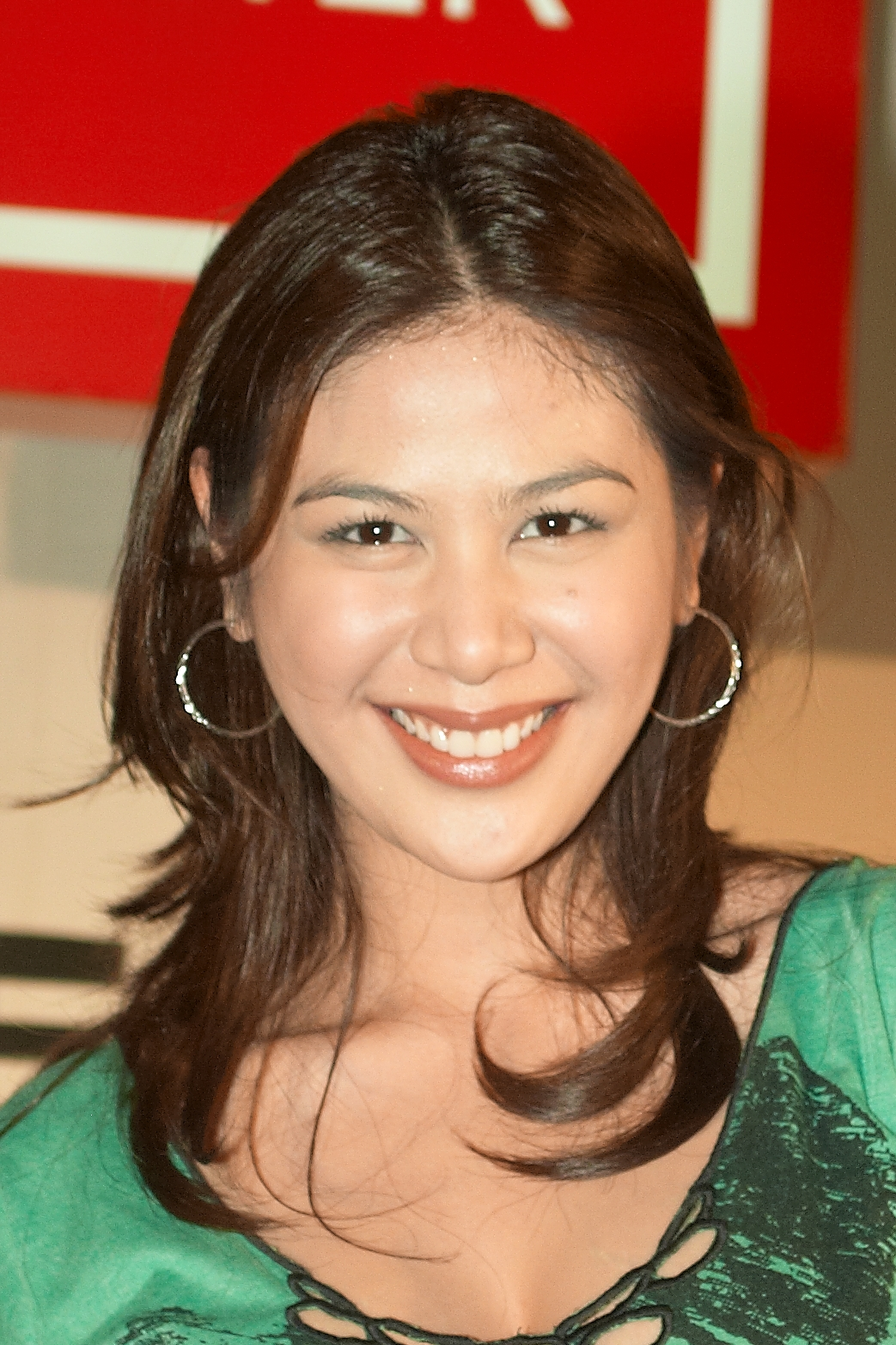
Valerie Concepcion

Lead cast

- Dingdong Dantes as Aquano

Supporting cast

- Rudy Fernandez as Camaro
- Jean Garcia as Celebes / Celeste
- Ariel Rivera as Baraccud
- Gardo Versoza as Agat
- Cherry Pie Picache as Remedios
- Iza Calzado as Amaya / Cielo
- Paolo Contis as Piranus
- Katrina Halili as Ruana / Helena
- Chynna Ortaleza as Vera
- Isabel Oli as Alona
- Tin Arnaldo
- Valerie Concepcion as Elisa
- Bianca King as Xera
- Elvis Gutierrez as Andromedo
- Mark Gil as Felipe
- Pen Medina as Naval / Balawis
- Ronnie Lazaro as Roman
- Janice Jurado as Amaya's mom
- Jackie Castillejo as Remedios' sister
- Jojo Alejar
- Gene Padilla as Talakitok
- Arthur Solinap as Eno

Guest cast

- Celia Rodriguez as Segunda
- Emilio Garcia as Ereus
- Edwin Reyes as Tiktakulo
- Noel Urbano as Elahe
- Renz Valerio as younger Aquano
- Biboy Ramirez as Daniel
- Bianca Pulmano as younger Amaya
- Paul Salas as younger Piranus
- Ella Cruz as younger Elisa
- Desiree del Valle as Azita
- Jana Victoria
- Rugene Ramos as Kiko

== Production ==
Principal photography commenced in September 2006.
