= Twin Hearts =

Philippine television drama series

- Title card
- Genre: Romantic drama
- Created by: Don Michael Perez
- Directed by: Dominic Zapata; Erick Salud
- Starring: Dingdong Dantes; Tanya Garcia; Dennis Trillo; Karylle
- Theme music composer: Wency Cornejo
- Opening theme: "Twin Hearts" by Sarah Geronimo and Devotion
- Country of origin: Philippines
- Original language: Tagalog
- No. of episodes: 173

Production
- Executive producers: Wilma Galvante; Redgynn Alba
- Camera setup: Multiple-camera setup
- Running time: 30 minutes
- Production company: GMA Entertainment TV

Original release
- Network: GMA Network
- Release: October 20, 2003 – June 18, 2004

Twin Hearts is a Philippine television drama romance series broadcast by GMA Network. Directed by Dominic Zapata and Erick Salud, it stars Dingdong Dantes, Tanya Garcia, Dennis Trillo and Karylle. It premiered on October 20, 2003 on the network's Telebabad line up. The series concluded on June 18, 2004, with a total of 173 episodes.

== Cast and characters ==
Cast

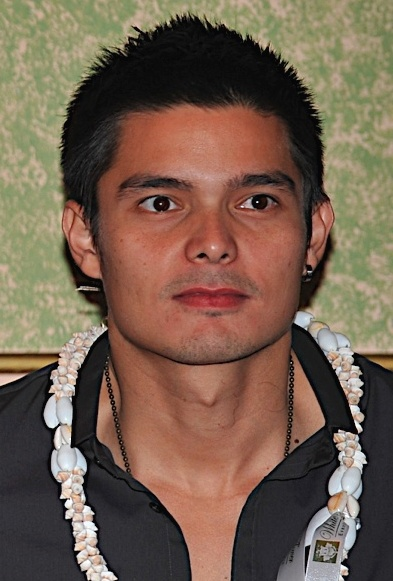
Dingdong Dantes

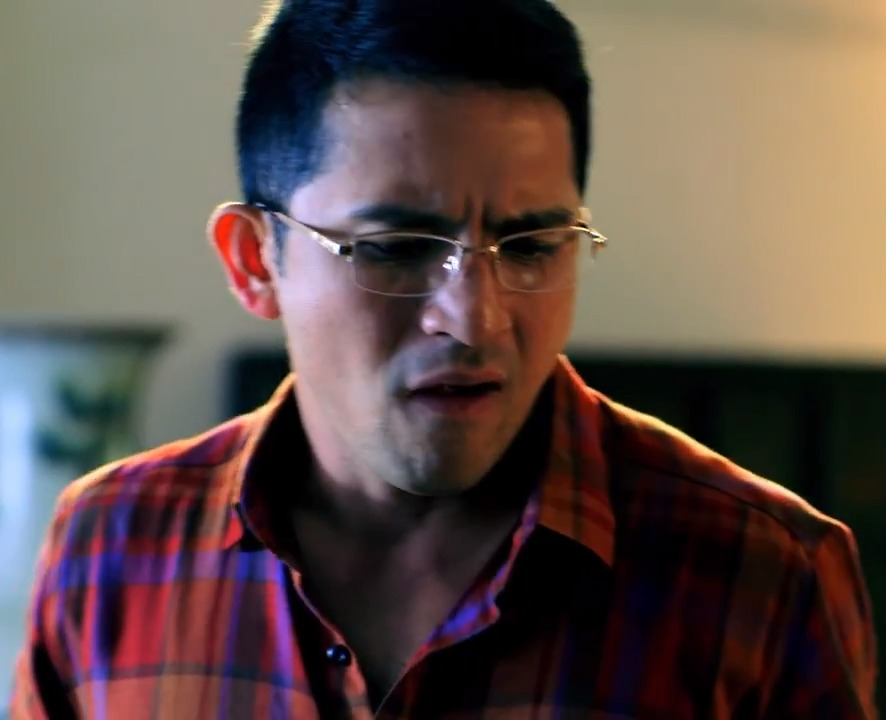
Dennis Trillo

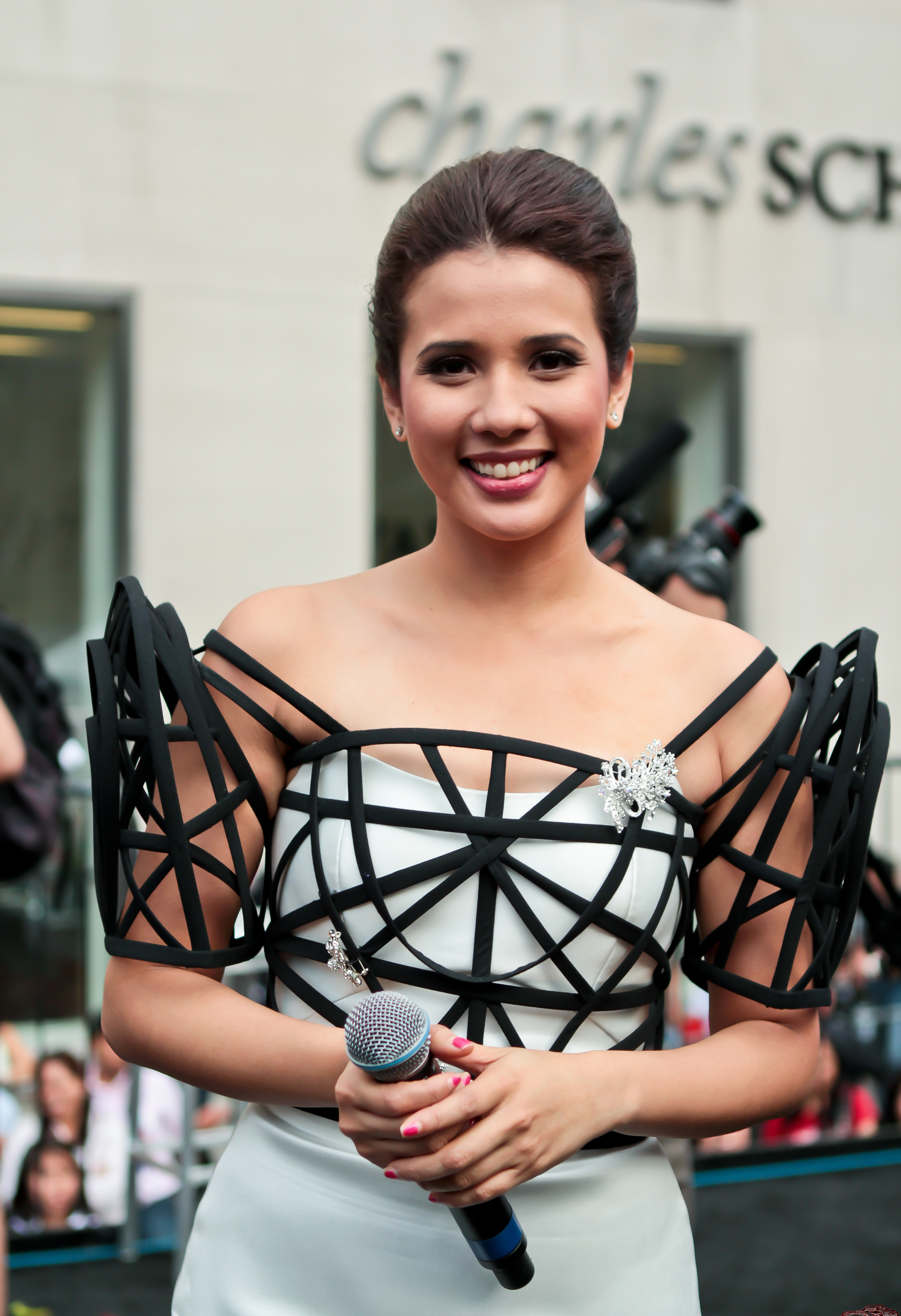
Karylle

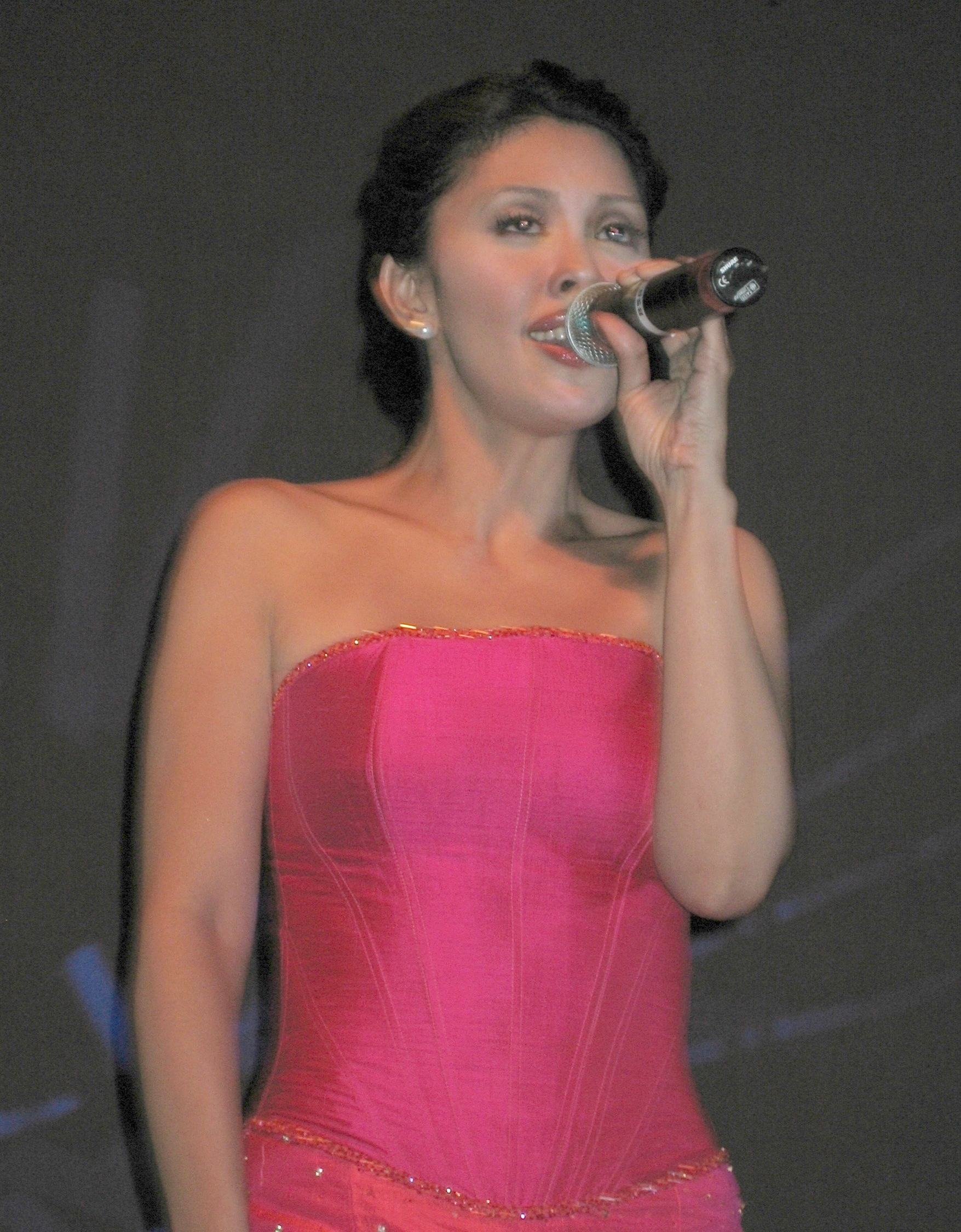
Pops Fernandez

Lead cast

- Dingdong Dantes as Adrian Asuncion
- Tanya Garcia as Althea Fontanilla
- Dennis Trillo as Glenn Saraga
- Karylle as Iris Medira / Jade Villanueva

Supporting cast

- Rudy Fernandez as Oscar Saraga
- Pops Fernandez as Adelle Medira
- Lani Mercado as Vanessa Fontanilla
- Jestoni Alarcon as Renan Fontanilla
- Liza Lorena as Sofia Fontanilla
- Toby Alejar as Gaston Asuncion
- Alicia Alonzo as Ceta Saraga
- Sandy Andolong as Frida Villanueva
- Albert Martinez as Ben Katigbac
- Pinky Amador as Murielle Brillo
- Tin Arnaldo as Yvette Kesller
- Maybelyn dela Cruz as Faith Ang
- Gabby Eigenmann as Cedrick Sebastian
- Marky Lopez as Joey Santos
- Melisa Henderson as Coco Borha

Guest cast

- Michael de Mesa
- Bembol Roco
- Marianne dela Riva
- Yayo Aguila
- Roy Alvarez
- Alvin Aragon
- Val Iglesias
- Rez Cortez
- Dyan Delfin
- Angel Locsin
- Vivian Foz
- January Isaac
- Vangie Labalan
- Berting Labra
- Maureen Larrazabal
- Joey Padilla
- Robert Ortega
- Jordan Herrera
- Jay Salas
- Frank Garcia
- Geoff Rodriguez
- Richard Quan
- Jake Roxas
- Jean Saburit
- Railey Valeroso
- Rich Vergara
