= List of My Husband's Lover characters =

The following is a list of regulars, recurring, guest and minor characters who have appeared in My Husband's Lover, a Filipino drama television series created and developed by Suzette Doctolero and produced by GMA Network. The series aired from June 10, 2013, til October 18, 2013, on the network's prime time block and starred Carla Abellana, Tom Rodriguez and Dennis Trillo as the main characters. Carolyn Galve serves as the executive producer of show for its entire run and Dominic Zapata directed the series.

The show is credited as the very first gay-themed series in Philippine television due to the series' central subject of homosexual relationships. The show tackles sensitive yet relevant social issues such as homosexual and bisexual relationships, homophobia and discrimination towards gay men, infidelity, pre-marital sex, and HIV/AIDS. It also tackles the importance of family, friendship, integrity and love.

My Husband's Lover chronicles the life of a woman, who belatedly discovers that her husband has been carrying on an affair, but not with another woman.

== Main characters ==
=== Eric Del Mundo ===
Portrayed by Dennis Trillo, Enrico or most commonly known as Eric is Vincent's high school buddy, basketball teammate and first romance. He is described as smart and sophisticated. He is an architect, managing his own design business. He poses a tough image for everyone to see, but in reality, he is an openly gay.

After several years abroad, Eric returns and is determined to win back the love of the man he lost in his youth. Instead, he finds that Vincent is already married to Lally, with whom he already has two kids.

Trillo was originally cast to play the character Vincent Soriano but he decided to play Eric del Mundo, instead. In an interview, Trillo explained that "[In] Temptation of Wife, where I played a philandering husband like Vincent; the only difference is that Vincent is gay. Basically, that's what drew me to choose [the role] Eric. I felt I had been doing the same roles over and over again for the past five years. I was getting bored and I needed something that would challenge me as an actor—and perhaps also remind people and the audience that I'm still here."

Trillo's breakthrough as an actor came when he won a Best Actor award from the Metro Manila Film Festival for his role as a cross-dressing gay spy in the 2004 period movie Aishite Imasu 1941: Mahal Kita. After that, he thought way past doing gay onscreen. But the role of Eric was "too good to pass up." He also considers My Husband's Lover as his "most triumphant TV outing".

=== Lally Agatep-Soriano ===
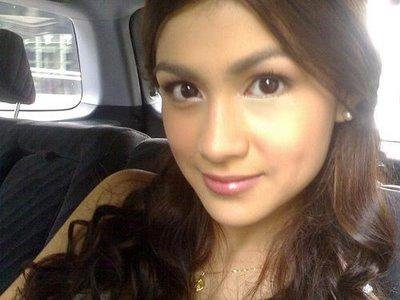
Carla Abellana plays Lally Soriano

Portrayed by Carla Abellana, Eulalia or just simply Lally is the loving wife of Vincent and a mother of Diego and Hanna. She is described as intelligent, romantic lady who will do everything for the man she loves. Lally comes from an impoverished and broken family. Her father, Galo Agatep (played by Mark Gil) left them for another woman when she was ten years old. Her younger version is portrayed by Therese Malvar.

Lally has been married to Vincent for ten years. She tries to be a perfect wife to Vincent in all aspects. But their seemingly perfect marriage starts to fall apart when Eric Del Mundo comes into the picture. It turns out that Eric was Vincent's first love, and the two have rekindled their flame.

Abellana was one of the first two (along with Dennis Trillo) to be cast for the lead roles. Although she described the series as "a risky project", Abellana didn't have qualms accepting the role. In an interview, she stated, "I have come out of my shell. I'm no longer shy, and I have more confidence. The concept is groundbreaking, so I didn't think twice about accepting the role of Lally." Abellana also felt that the show made her "a formidable actress to contend with."

Abellana has received raved reviews for her performance that are layered and subtle, way above the usual melodramatic ways usually expected in Filipino teledrama. According to her, she uses subtle acting to make her portrayal more effective. She further explains, "I've learned to use my piercing eyes to convey emotions. I want to be believable and convincing. I want the audience to see my character, not the actress. But, we have to watch every step we take, we have to be careful." Abellana also reveals that the most difficult scene she have done was the revelation that "her husband was gay". "The hospital scene was emotionally taxing, as well, because it was when Vincent (Tom Rodriguez) admitted that he was gay."

=== Vincent Soriano ===
Portrayed by Tom Rodriguez, Vince, called by Eric, Vicente or Vincent is Lally's loving husband. He is the only child of prominent couple—Armando, a retired military man and Elaine, a loving yet overbearing woman. Vincent is a car enthusiast; he collects and sells luxury cars as his business.

Rich, handsome and intelligent, Vincent is a "perfect catch" with one flaw – he is a closeted gay man. He fought his homosexual feelings and married Lally to please his parents and society, but he later realizes that he cannot totally forget his love for his high school lover, Eric del Mundo.

Recently left ABS CBN, Tom Rodriguez was chosen to portray Vincent Soriano, from many actors who auditioned for the said role. Rodriguez had to go through tests before being cast. During his audition, he acted one scene—a break-up scene—with Trillo. Zapata described Rodriguez as "the perfect Vincent" among the many actors who auditioned for the role, said that "[While] the others treated homosexuality as a disease, Tom interpreted it with so much understanding, and that's what we're looking for." Rodriguez described his role as very complex and demanding as the whole conflict of the show lies in his character. Rodriguez said, to prepare for the project, he watched gay-themed films like Brokeback Mountain and Love of Siam and talked to people with similar stories. He also did research and found out that "homosexual love is not really different from a heterosexual one. But of course things are more difficult for them because of all the social biases that exist."

Rodriguez considers the series as his "biggest break". He, likewise, considers it a challenge working with Trillo, with whom he has developed a friendship and considers him (Trillo) as one of the finest actors he has worked with, in the short period that he has been in the limelight.

== Recurring characters ==
=== Armando Soriano ===
Portrayed by Roi Vinzon. He is Vincent's delightful father. Armando or General Armando Garcia y Soriano is a retired Army-General and a certified womanizer during his prime. A homophobe; Armando easily gets irritated every time he encounters gay men and treats them with contempt and spite. When he finds out about Vincent's sexuality, he forcibly sent him to a military camp (to join a 45-day boot camp) with the purpose of "correcting" his sexual preference, the younger version is portrayed by Jay Aquitania. It is revealed in the series that Armando entered the PMA at the age of 18 under the suggestion of his father (Vincent's grandfather) and admits that he is afraid of wielding a gun, to die and to kill others for the sake of defending the country. However, Armando told Vincent that his life as a soldier helped him change his mind and heart. As the story progresses, Armando is suffering from HIV after he had a brief affair with some women at the beerhouse. In the end of the series, he finally apologizes his son, Vincent because of his horrible condition and accepting his son as gay finally overcoming his homophobia.

=== David ===
Portrayed by Victor Basa, David is Vincent's college best friend and ex-lover. David is a chef and is proud of being gay but not the "flamboyant" type. He is described as an intelligent, romantic guy who will do everything for his greatest love. David also serves as "conscience" to Vincent, advised him to come out of the closet and choose the one who will make him happy.

Basa originally auditioned for the role of Vincent Soriano, but ended up portraying David. In an interview, Basa described his role David quite difficult in the sense that he doesn't want his character to look stereotype. He further stated, "I don't want it to look stereotype people might say it was just like any gay role that they have seen before. So in playing my role, I have to be truthful in my scenes. Some scenes were kind of awkward to do at first but later on I used to it.

=== Danny ===
portrayed by Kevin Santos, Danny is Eric's best friend and confidante. An "all-out" gay, known for his biting and sarcastic wit, and bad luck in relationships – which become a point of humor within the series. His failed love life is possibly due to his being the breadwinner of his family.

=== Diego and Hannah Soriano ===
Portrayed by Antone Limgenco and Elijah Alejo, respectively, Vincent and Lally's children.

=== Elaine Soriano ===
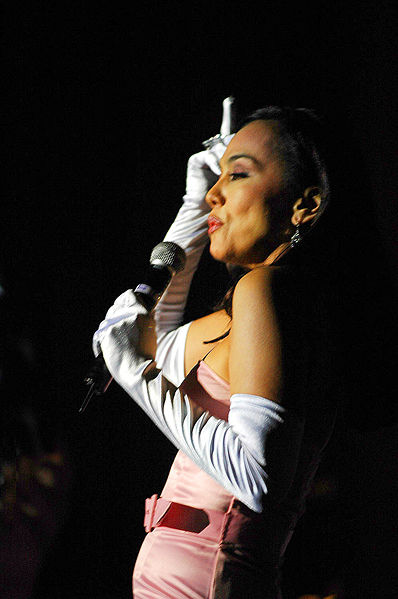
Kuh Ledesma plays Elaine Soriano.

Portrayed by Kuh Ledesma. She is Vincent's loving mother and an austere mother-in-law to Lally. Known for her overbearing and perfectionist nature, Elaine is not easy to please and rarely satisfied with anything. She is also opinionated and frequently can't help but express her strongly held belief, regardless of offending others.

=== Evelyn Agatep ===
Portrayed by Karel Marquez. She is Lally's older sister, who is her exact opposite in terms of outlook on life. Her frustrations, rebellious and self-centered nature drives her to make drastic decisions that eventually leads her to life of mistakes, regrets and penance. At present, she lives a humble life with her three children and a womanizer husband.

=== Sandra Agatep ===
Portrayed by Glydel Mercado. She is Lally and Evelyn's doting mother. Though she is not a perfect mom, Sandra is admirable for single-handedly raising her two daughters. She spends her life as a destitute mother whose only dream is to give her children a better future and is willing to sacrifice everything – even her morals – for them.

=== Soledad "Sol" Del Mundo ===
Portrayed by Chanda Romero. She is Eric's loving and supportive mother. Sinag, as she is commonly referred to (a Tagalog word which means "ray") is a visual artist. Sinag knows about her son's sexual orientation and she supports him wholeheartedly. She is characterized as being liberated and has a pleasant outlook on life, sympathetic yet realistic woman. Sol is also a novelist, botanist, and legendary painter.

Romero has received raved reviews for her performance as Mommy Sol, reason why she is now called the "Pambansang Ina ng mga Beki" (lit. National Mother of the Gays). In an interview, Romero explained what makes her character special, said that "I've always loved gays! [...] So when this role was given to me, I was excited not only because it's different from my usual kontrabida (villain) roles but because Sol was to be the wisdom and the conscience of Eric and of the story for that matter. But I never expected Sol would turn out to be such a character so loved by everyone especially gays. Gays wished I was their mother. Everywhere I went, gays from all walks of life would react so warmly to me. Some get giggle and jump up and down in excitement. Some want me to adopt them [laughs].

=== Vicky Araneta ===
Portrayed by Bettina Carlos, Victoria or Vicky is Lally's best friend and confidante. She is a thirty-year-old single mother, working as a fashion editor and stylist at a magazine. Vicky is characterized as being so jaded with love that she chooses to have a string of flings with younger men than to be in a committed relationship.

== Notable guest characters ==
Below is the list of notable guest characters (being those who have been in the series for some considerable time and have had a significant impact on the story) appeared in the series:

=== Galo Agatep ===
Portrayed by Mark Gil. He is Sandra's husband and father to Evelyn and Lally. Galo left his family for another woman but he, later on, returns to asks for their acceptance and Sandra finally forgives him after finding out that he has a lung cancer.

=== Manuel Soriano ===
Portrayed by Roy Alvarez(†), Manuel is Vincent's uncle and Armando's older brother, a retired Navy Admiral. Just like Armando, Manuel used to despise his son Zandro for being gay but he eventually accepted him wholeheartedly.

=== Martin Lizada ===
Portrayed by Rodjun Cruz. He met Eric at a bar and became the new love interest of Eric. However, Martin broke up with Eric afterwards.

=== Paul Salcedo ===
Portrayed by Pancho Magno. He became Lally's friend after he gave her a ride to her home. He is there to comfort her during her problematic times, despite knowing that Lally is already married to Vincent.

=== Stella ===
Portrayed by Chynna Ortaleza. She is the pregnant, homeless woman who David offers to help in exchange for her baby. Although Stella knows David's sexual preference, she can't help herself but to fall in love with him because of his kindness.

=== Zandro "Zsa Zsa" Soriano ===
Portrayed by Keempee de Leon, Zandro or "Zsa Zsa" is Vincent's gay cousin who struggles for his father's love and acceptance.

It is revealed in episode 42 that he studied in a Catholic school through his father's efforts. He is also a licensed medical doctor who studied in one of the country's most prestigious universities.

Unlike De Leon's comic roles in the past, the role Zandro requires serious acting since the character is a "legitimate" contributor to the show's drama, not a comic relief. In an in terview, De Leon finds the role as is more challenging than his previous gay roles. He recalls "Beforehand, the director (Dominic Zapata) told me that the role is a "serious" one unlike the "gay" roles I usually done in the past." The actor also admitted that he was supposed to decline the role when it was first offered to him only because the taping schedule ran in conflict with his daily stint as co-host of Eat Bulaga!. Fortunately, the actor's manager and the producers of the series were able to make some adjustments to the schedule. "So I said "Yes" right away."

De Leon's debut in the series created a buzz online and was heavily discussed on Twitter. "Netizens" praised the actor for his natural and convincing portrayal of the gay character.

== Minor characters ==
- Manny – portrayed by Mike Magat. He is Evelyn's womanizer husband who left her for another woman. Manny eventually returned to his family after he realizes his wrongdoings.
- Luz – portrayed by Dexter Doria. She is Danny's mother. Has criticism with gay relationships though she has accepted Danny's sexual preference.
- Bek Bek – portrayed by Jade Lopez. Danny's younger sister who became a mother at a young age and whose family is being supported by Danny.
- Mike – portrayed by Vince Velasco. David's first long-term boyfriend. However, he broke David up after David has to choose Stella instead.
- Doña Charito Vda. de Carbonel – portrayed by Jaclyn Jose. She is a crossover character from the show Mundo Mo'y Akin. She is an arrogant and judgmental friend of Elaine Soriano.
- Stanley dela Rosa – portrayed by Kiel Rodriguez. He's one of Vincent's friends and also work in the car dealership owned by Vincent.
- Gary – portrayed by Rey Talosig. He was recommended by Danny to Eric for a date after Eric's breakup with Vincent.
- Victor – portrayed by Franco Laurel, Eric's co-architect.
- Yaya Ona – portrayed by Flora Gasser. She is Sol and Eric's trusted nanny.
- Mark Evasco – portrayed by Gino dela Peña, Eric's co-architect.
- Bessie – portrayed by Louella de Cordova, Elaine's socialite friend.
- Jackson – portrayed by Kokoy de Santos, son of Yaya Ona; a houseboy.
- Sam – portrayed by Ryan Agoncillo, Lally's love interest at the end of the series.
