= List of Mundo Mo'y Akin characters =

The following is a list of major, recurring, notable and minor characters appeared in Mundo Mo'y Akin (internationally titled as Deception), a Filipino drama television series created by RJ Nuevas, developed by Denoy Navarro-Punio and produced by GMA Network. The series premiered on March 18, 2013, on the network’s prime time block, 8:45 p.m. time slot, and on March 19, 2013, worldwide via GMA Pinoy TV. The series concluded its twenty-five-week run on September 6, 2013, with a total of 122 episodes. Michele Borja served as the executive producer of the series, while Andoy Ranay directed the show.

The television drama entails a compelling storyline that explores the insatiable quest for beauty, and wealth. The main characters find themselves ensnared in a game of deceit and betrayal and will stop at anything to gain power and prestige.

== Major characters ==
=== Perlita Mendoza † /- Smith ===
Portrayed by Sunshine Dizon, Perlita is Marilyn Mendoza's loving and protective adopted-mother and Darlene's biological mother from George Smith. Perlita is a simple woman who, although deprived of a beauty appearance, has a kind heart and an adorable character. For her, "it is what on the inside that counts!" She works as a household helper at the Carbonel mansion, wherein she crosses paths with Giselle—the wife of her boss, Ziggy Carbonel—oblivious that the former is her own best friend Rodora Santos in disguise. As a mother, Perlita is willing to sacrifice everything for the sake of her beloved daughter. But what she does not know is that her daughter is actually not hers.

Later in the series after she reveals Giselle's real identity as Rodora Santos to Ziggy due to plastic surgery made by Dr. Ron Reyes and her scheme of switching her own daughter Marilyn to her daughter Darlene, she reunites with her penpal, George Smith who is now a multi-billionaire and wants to propose his marriage to her. But after Darlene accidentally knocks Marilyn in the stove during their physical brawl, it causes fire in the kitchen when she attempts to save Marilyn from the fire until she dies from suffocation. Her death causes both Darlene and Marilyn to end their rivalry.

The series served as Dizon's comeback television project after her four-year hiatus from showbiz. Dizon described the project as "A very good one that is hard to refuse. The story itself convinced me to accept the job. When they laid down the storyline, I was really moved." Mundo Mo'y Akin is one of the two television dramas she signed-up for the network for the year 2013.

=== Giselle Atienza-Carbonel / Rodora Santos ===
Portrayed by Angelika dela Cruz, Giselle is Ziggy Carbonel's wife, adopted mother to Darlene and the mother of Marilyn. With a beautiful face, an impeccable figure, plus a handsome and wealthy husband, Giselle holds the world in her hands. But behind her beautiful appearance and perfect life is a secret past. In reality, she is Rodora Santos, a dark-skinned and ugly woman who underwent plastic surgery. Worse, to make her deception more realistic, she switches her ugly baby with Perlita's beautiful child. Giselle, however, still dreads the moment when she will have to tell Ziggy the truth. Fears of abandonment push her, however, to keep the secret hidden.

However, her dark secret is exposed by Perlita as well as her scheme. Causing Ziggy to get angry and dismayed from her actions and leaves. But he accepts Marilyn as their daughter after her face is disfigured by Darlene in a car accident. Giselle also apologizes to her husband for her actions as they reconcile for their daughter.

In an interview, Dela Cruz said that at first, she had qualms accepting the role because "she finds it a bit weird and unrealistic for her age to play a mother to a teenage girl." After several discussions with the production people regarding the concept, story line and her character, Dela Cruz finally accepted the role.

=== Lauren Young as Darlene Atienza Carbonel / Darlene Mendoza Smith ===
Portrayed by Lauren Young, Darlene is Perlita Mendoza's biological daughter but was switched with Marilyn. Safe in the make-believe that Ziggy and Giselle Carbonel are indeed her real family, Darlene grew up in affluence and is used to getting whatever she wants, except for one thing — the love of her mother, Giselle Carbonel. She finds comfort in Marilyn Mendoza's company, the daughter of their household helper, Perlita. Despite the apparent differences in their social status, the two became best of friends. However, their relationship starts to falter when they fell in love with the same man – Jerome Alvarez.

Later after her biological mother, Perlita exposes Giselle's real identity and her schemes. She could not accept the truth but she begins to care for her mother as the series progresses but her rivalry with Marilyn still remains. The car accident made by her causes Marilyn's ugly face to be disfigured as a result she ends up in jail for her actions. Her actions sterns for jealousy, disrespect and bratty which she imitates Dona Charito Carbonel's mean and strict actions which is the main reason why Jerome rejects her for Marilyn. When Darlene returns for being a mean streak after revealing she was a daughter of Perlita and George Smith who is a multi-billionaire, she still treats Marilyn as ugly despite her face made by plastic surgery. Her behavior causes her own downfall when she accidentally knocks Marilyn in the stove that causes fire but at the cost of her own mother's life when she saves Marilyn from the fire before she dies in suffocation. At her mother's funeral, Darlene finally apologizes for her actions as she cries of her mother's death as Marilyn thanked Perlita for taking care of her. Both her and Marilyn's rivalry had ended as they reconcile their friendship. In the end, she goes with her biological father, George in Italy.

Young signed on to portray the antagonist character, Darlene and is served as her first project after she transferred and inked an exclusive contract with GMA Network.

=== Louise delos Reyes as Marilyn Atienza Carbonel / Marilyn Mendoza ===
Portrayed by Louise delos Reyes, Marilyn is the rightful heiress of the Carbonels but was switched with Darlene and grew up in poverty. Marilyn is a caring and obedient daughter who strives to better herself for the sake of her foster mother, Perlita Mendoza. She is intelligent, brave and kind-hearted, but despite all of these good qualities, Marilyn experiences being bullied and humiliated by others because of her unattractive appearances. During these hard times, Marilyn finds comfort in the company of Darlene Carbonel, the daughter of the family that her mother Perlita works for. But their friendship will be put to test as one guy comes between them – Jerome Alvarez.

Their rivalry begins with only Jerome Alvarez as Darlene treats her like trash. After revealing she was Giselle's daughter and the rightful heiress to the Carbonels after Perlita exposes her biological mother's scheme. Darlene could not accept the truth as she takes her to her car for a joyride as a result of the car accident, Marilyn's ugly face was disfigured causing Darlene to be in jail for her actions and she along with her family to take her in the US for her face surgery. In later episodes, Marilyn becomes beautiful and fine lady after the accident as Jerome likes her appearance. Despite the Carbonels ending up bankrupt, she decides to help her family. Her rivalry with Darlene continues when she was revealed to be the daughter of both Perlita and George, both girls went into a physical brawl. Darlene accidentally knocks her in a stove causing a fire in a kitchen. Marilyn was later saved by Perlita before she dies in suffocation. After her step-mother's death, she thanked her for taking care of her. In the end of the series, she and her family decide to travel the US as she gives farewell to Jerome before she leaves the airport.

=== Jerome Alvarez ===
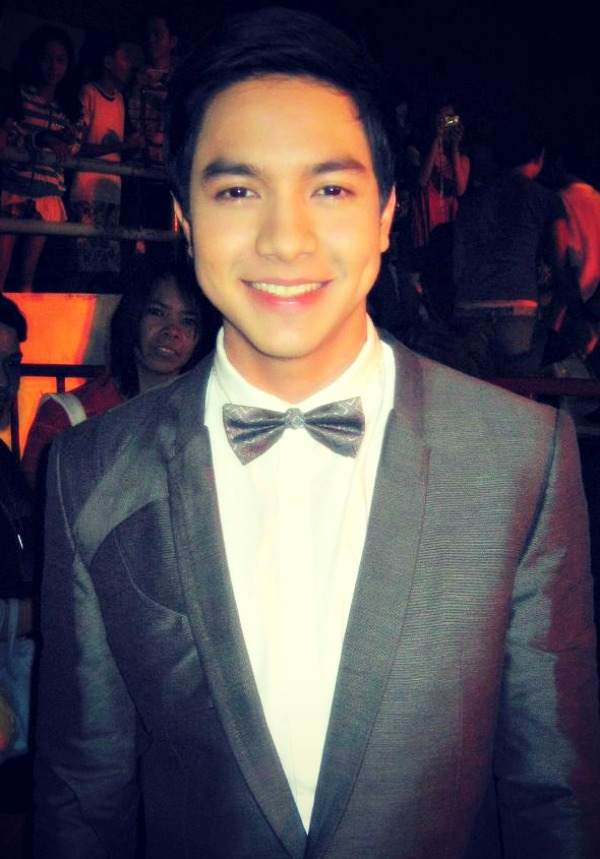
Alden Richards plays the protagonist character Jerome Alvarez

Portrayed by Alden Richards. Good-looking, street-smart, romantic with the soul of a dreamer, Jerome finished Culinary Arts and now working as a sous-chef in the resort owned by the Carbonels. Jerome has an unrequited crush on the bratty Darlene Carbonel, and has been long-time friends with both her and Marilyn Mendoza [a girl who despite possessing an ugly appearance lies a heart of gold]. He eventually embroiled in a complicated love triangle between the two girls.

=== Zenaida "Aida" Carbonel ===
Portrayed by Jolina Magdangal, Aida is the niece of Charito Carbonel's late husband, Ziggy's cousin and the surrogate mother of Jerome Alvarez. Aida finished her degree in Business Management but ended up working for the Carbonels as a constant aid to Charito's every whim and demand. Aida believes that she also has the rights for the Carbonel's vast properties and is determined to reclaim what is rightfully hers. She holds the key to the secret behind the real identities of Darlene Carbonel and Marilyn Mendoza and uses it to blackmail Giselle Carbonel to get what she wants, as well as to exact revenge on Doña Charito and Ziggy.

The role, Aida was originally offered to Agot Isidro but the actress turned it down because she found the role "quite similar" to her popular character Leila Samonte in the 2012 hit series, One True Love. The role went to Magdangal, who says in an interview "it's my first time to play antagonist role [...] it's kinda weird but challenging." Mundo Mo'y Akin was Jolina’s last television series on GMA before returning to ABS-CBN the following year.

=== Ziggy Carbonel ===
Portrayed by Gabby Eigenmann, Ziggy is Doña Charito Carbonel's only son, Giselle's husband and father to Darlene. Born with a silver spoon in his mouth, Ziggy is used to being given everything he wants. He works as the general manager of "Carbonel Barongs"–their family business, and later as a resort owner. Happy-go-lucky and vain, Ziggy believes that life is all about pleasure. He is also known for being a womanizer and loves being surrounded by beautiful and sexy women. A vicious man, he can stand up to anyone and he never hesitates to speak his mind on things. But behind his seemingly "perfect world" hid a deep, dark secret that his wife, Giselle has been hiding for him for a long time.

Eigenmann was the first actor cast and said "I do not mind it playing another antagonist. There is so much challenge from it. People never get bored of it, including myself."

=== Doña Charito Vda. de Carbonel ===
Portrayed by Jaclyn Jose, Charito is the matriarch of the prominent Carbonel clan. A former beauty queen and model, Charito now owns and runs "Carbonel Barongs", a well-known barong tagalog and Filipiniana shop. Arrogant and highly judgemental, Charito believes in the importance of beauty and hates ugly people [making Perlita and Marilyn the objects of her scorn]. A perfectionist and ambitious woman, she will do anything and everything just to accomplish her goals. Unaware of her granddaughter's true identity, Charito treats Darlene like a real princess—she spoils her to no end and sees to it that she has everything.

== Recurring characters ==
Several supporting characters were given expansive and recurring appearances in the progressive story line.

=== Romeo "Romy" Alvarez ===
Portrayed by Kier Legaspi, Romy is the irresponsible father of Jerome Alvarez and Aida Carbonel's hot-tempered live in partner. Romy is a lazy leech who wants to get rich but refuses work and loves to gamble.

=== Mama Josie ===
Portrayed by Frances Makil-Ignacio, Josie is Perlita Mendoza's comic best friend and confidante, and Marilyn's godmother. Loud, bubbly and unconventional, Josie owns and runs a beauty parlor. She proves herself a true friend as she constantly stands by Perlita's side through all the latter's ordeals.

=== Nonoy Pambide ===
Portrayed by Sef Cadayona, Nonoy is the friend of Jerome who also works in the resort owned by the Carbonels. He knows about the special relationship between Jerome Alvarez and Darlene Carbonel and soon notices Marilyn Mendoza's feelings for his friend. He has a biting and sarcastic wit, serving as somewhat of a comic relief throughout the series.

=== Alison Alcantara ===
Portrayed by Rita Daniela, Alison is the mean-spirited buddy of Darlene Carbonel later Marilyn Carbonel (formerly Marilyn Mendoza). She is quite against Jerome Alvarez for her friend due to his social status. She is also quite against Perlita for her mother due to her ugliness. She is opinionated and often can't help but express her strongly held beliefs.

=== Harry Renacia ===
Portrayed by Marc Acueza, Harry is Marilyn's new-found friend, working as a television news reporter. Harry pretends to be Marilyn's boyfriend (to make Jerome jealous) for quite some time on the series, until he realized he already fall in love for her—for real!

=== Chef Andy Santos ===
Portrayed by Jojit Lorenzo, Chef Andy is Jerome's business partner, friend, confidante, and somewhat a father figure. He is the former head chef of the Carbonels but he later decides to partner up with Jerome and Nonoy and put up their own restaurant. The character provides comic relief to the otherwise dramatic events that plague Jerome.

== Other notable characters ==
Below is the list of notable characters (being those who have been in the series for some considerable time and have had a significant impact on the story) appeared in the series:

- Doña Carmen Atienza† – portrayed by Lui Mananzala. She was Rodora Santos/Giselle Carbonel's former employer—a hot-tempered and abusive spinster who willed her vast fortune to her. She died because of heart attack and this became Rodora's way in order to undergo plastic surgery, change her name into Giselle Atienza, and marry Ziggy Carbonel.
- Ruben Santos - portrayed by Bing Davao. He is Rodora/Giselle's father who despises her because of her ugly appearance. He is characterized as being drunkard and womanizer. Ruben eventually regrets his actions and repents.
- Krizzy Ferreira – portrayed by Jenny Miller. She is a socialite and cunning woman, considered as a family friend of the Carbonels. She is also Ziggy's ex-girlfriend and business partner—they established a resort. However, her closeness to Ziggy also makes her the object of jealousy of Giselle.
- Dr. Ron Reyes - portrayed by Leandro Baldemor, an in-demand plastic surgeon and the one who created Rodora/Giselle's beautiful face. Dr. Reyes blackmails Giselle and threatens to expose her secret in order to get what he wants—particularly the business deal with the Carbonels.

== Minor characters ==
- George Smith / Miguel Archangel - portrayed by Fabio Ide, Perlita's Filipino-American "penpal" whom she believes loves her sincerely, but immediately dumps her after taking her virginity and all her money. He is Darlene's biological father. Later in the series, George returns as a multi-millionaire artist and asks for Perlita's forgiveness and acceptance. She tried to engage to Perlita for marriage but she died.
- Ezperanza - portrayed by Ama Quiambao †, the midwife who begat Perlita and Giselle and also served as the key in unraveling the mystery behind Marilyn and Darlene's real identity.
- Ryan Ferreira - portrayed by Vivo Ouano, the arrogant son of Krizzy Ferreira and the avid suitor of Darlene Carbonel. He is a car enthusiast and loves to talk everything about cars and racing, which for Darlene is "one boring topic".
- Aaron Morales - portrayed by Benedict Campos, the rich and arrogant suitor of Darlene.
- Cong. Ramon Borja - portrayed by Menggie Cobarrubias, a congressman, family friend of the Carbonel's and the proud father of Anthony. Charito cut her connections with him after discovering that his son tried to rape Marilyn.
- Anthony Borja - portrayed by Frank Magalona, son of a congressman and a family friend of the Carbonels. He is Doña Charito's bet to become Marilyn's boyfriend. Like Jerome, Anthony is also a chef and a businessman, as well, managing his own five-star restaurant. He was beat by Ziggy after he found out that he tried to rape Marilyn.
- Ria - portrayed by Arny Ross Roque, Jerome's newfound friend, confidante and somewhat new love interest. She gave back Jerome to Marilyn after realizing that he really loves Marilyn.
- Elaine Soriano - portrayed by Kuh Ledesma (a crossover character from My Husband's Lover), Doña Charito's socialite "friend". She heard rumors that the Carbonels are now bankrupt.
- Anna Karenina "Karen" Villarama Zamora - portrayed by Barbie Forteza (a crossover character from Anna KareNina), Perlita's "Helper". Perlita met her while she stopped her vehicle to bump her.
