= Obra (TV program) =

2008 Philippine television drama series

- Title card
- Genre: Drama
- Developed by: Jun Lana
- Starring: Katrina Halili; JC de Vera; Sunshine Dizon; Iza Calzado
- Country of origin: Philippines
- Original language: Tagalog
- No. of episodes: 16

Production
- Executive producer: Wilma Galvante
- Production locations: Metro Manila, Philippines
- Camera setup: Multiple-camera setup
- Running time: 34–42 minutes
- Production company: GMA Entertainment TV

Original release
- Network: GMA Network
- Release: August 14 – November 27, 2008

Obra (transl. work) is a 2008 Philippine television drama anthology series broadcast by GMA Network. Starring Katrina Halili, JC de Vera, Sunshine Dizon and Iza Calzado, it premiered on August 14, 2008. The series concluded on November 27, 2008, with a total of 16 episodes.

The series is streaming online on YouTube.

== Episodes ==
=== Katrina Halili episodes ===
No.	Title	Directed by	Written by	Co-starring	Original release date
1	"Misteryosa" (transl. mysterious)	Jun Lana	Jun Lana	Ian Veneracion; Antonio Aquitania; Deborah Sun	August 14, 2008
2	"Bayaran" (transl. payment)	Maryo J. de los Reyes	Kit Villanueva-Langit	Richard Gomez; Gary Estrada; Carmen Soriano	August 21, 2008
3	"For Love or Money"	Bibeth Orteza	Denoy Navarro-Punio	Eddie Garcia; Eugene Domingo; Polo Ravales; John Lapus	August 28, 2008
4	"Taong Grasa" (transl. grease person)	Joel Lamangan	Dode Cruz	Paolo Contis; Raquel Villavicencio	September 4, 2008

=== JC de Vera episodes ===
No.	Title	Directed by	Written by	Co-starring	Original release date
5	"Pretty Boy"	Jun Lana	Jun Lana	Gina Alajar; Chanda Romero	September 11, 2008
6	"Rehas" (transl. jail)	Mac Alejandre	Dode Cruz	Tirso Cruz III; Lovi Poe; Joko Diaz; Shyr Valdez	September 18, 2008
7	"Daddy Dearest"	Joel Lamangan	Denoy Navarro-Punio	Gardo Versoza; Michelle Madrigal; Bernadette Alyson; John Feir	September 25, 2008
8	"Sintoy"	Maryo J. de los Reyes	R.J. Nuevas	Rhian Ramos; Carmi Martin; Baron Geisler	October 2, 2008

=== Sunshine Dizon episodes ===
No.	Title	Directed by	Written by	Co-starring	Original release date
9	"Butch"	Joel Lamangan	Dode Cruz	Chynna Ortaleza; Robert Villar	October 9, 2008
10	"Drama Queen"	Maryo J. de los Reyes	R.J. Nuevas	Yul Servo; Liza Lorena; Marky Cielo; Paolo Paraiso	October 16, 2008
11	"Rosa Negra: Part I"	Jun Lana	Jun Lana	Jay Manalo; Maureen Larrazabal; Dexter Doria	October 23, 2008
12	"Rosa Negra: Part II"	Jun Lana	Jun Lana	Jay Manalo; Maureen Larrazabal; Dexter Doria	October 30, 2008

=== Iza Calzado episodes ===
No.	Title	Directed by	Written by	Co-starring	Original release date
13	"Sanib" (transl. joint)	Topel Lee	Denoy Navarro-Punio	Ian de Leon; Rommel Padilla; Isabel Granada; Spanky Manikan; Sandy Talag	November 6, 2008
14	"Beauty Queen"	Dominic Zapata	Senedy Que	Melanie Marquez; Carlene Aguilar; Marco Alcaraz; Miriam Quiambao	November 13, 2008
15	"Boksingera" (transl. boxer)	Mark Reyes	Roy C. Iglesias	Dingdong Dantes; Pen Medina; Shirley Fuentes	November 20, 2008
16	"Stella .45"	Rico Gutierrez	Elmer L. Gatchalian	Ian Veneracion; Bobby Andrews; Neil Ryan Sese	November 27, 2008

== Accolades ==
Accolades received by Obra
Year	Award	Category	Recipient	Result	Ref.
2009	1st MTRCB TV Awards	Best Drama Anthology	Obra	Won	
2009	23rd PMPC Star Awards for Television	Best Drama Anthology	Obra	Nominated	
2009	23rd PMPC Star Awards for Television	Best Single Performance by an Actress	JC de Vera ("Pretty Boy")	Nominated	
2009	23rd PMPC Star Awards for Television	Best Single Performance by an Actress	Richard Gomez ("Bayaran")	Nominated	
2009	23rd PMPC Star Awards for Television	Best Single Performance by an Actress	Gina Alajar ("Pretty Boy")	Nominated	
2009	23rd PMPC Star Awards for Television	Best Single Performance by an Actress	Sunshine Dizon ("Butch")	Won	
2009	5th USTv Students' Choice Award	Best Drama Anthology	Obra	Won	
