= List of Mundo Mo'y Akin episodes =

The following is a list of episodes of Mundo Mo'y Akin (internationally titled Deception), a Filipino drama television series created by RJ Nuevas, developed by Denoy Navarro-Punio and produced by GMA Network. It premiered on March 18, 2013 on the network's prime time block, 8:45 p.m. time slot, and on March 19, 2013 worldwide via GMA Pinoy TV. The series concluded its twenty-five-week run on September 6, 2013 with a total of 122 episodes. Michele Borja served as the executive producer while Andoy Ranay directed the show.

The forty-five-minute scripted drama follows a compelling storyline that explores the insatiable quest for beauty, and wealth. The main characters find themselves ensnared in a game of deceit and betrayal and will stop at anything to gain power and prestige.

Originally slated to air for sixteen weeks, the series was awarded several extensions due to its consistent good performance in the ratings game. On July 12, 2013 the series claimed the top spot in the list of most watched programs across Nation Urban Philippines, Urban Luzon and Mega Manila. Based on data from Nielsen TV Audience Measurement (overnight data), the show became the highest rating program in NUTAM with an average household rating of 27.9%. It likewise led the lists of most watched programs in Urban Luzon and Mega Manila, which represent 76 and 59 percent of the total urban TV household population in the entire country, with an average household rating of 33.2% and 36.4%, respectively. The series was also considered a critical success, positively received by viewers, writers and critics, from its premiere episode.

== Series overview ==
The ratings indicate below are based on Mega Manila and Urban Luzon (represent 76 and 59 percent of the total urban TV household population in the entire Philippines) overnight ratings gathered by the TV ratings supplier, Nielsen TV Audience Measurement, where it consistently ranked within the top ten of the weekly television ratings. "Rank" refers to how well the show rated compared to other television series that aired that date. The "Season premiere" is the date that the first episode of the season aired, and the "Season finale" is the date that the final episode of the season aired.

Season	No. of episodes	Season premiere	Rating	Rank	Season finale	Rating	Rank
1	77	March 18, 2013	22.7%	4	July 5, 2013	31.4%	1
2	45	July 8, 2013	29.6%	1	September 6, 2013	31.6%	1

== Synopsis ==
Childhood best friends, Rodora and Perlita have always suffered from the incessant taunting and ridicule for their ugly appearances. While Perlita accepted these criticisms gracefully and is contented with her life, Rodora, on the other hand, believed that there's no future and hope for unattractive people like them. Armed with her sheer determination, Rodora works under Doña Carmen, a rich but abusive old woman. When the spinster dies of a heart attack, Rodora claims all her wealth and uses it to undergo plastic surgery. She completely put her past behind her and changes her name to Giselle.

Meanwhile, Perlita is willing to love any man who will accept her entirely despite her physical flaw. This leads her to trust George, a Filipino-American guy whom she believes loves her sincerely. But after one night, this guy dumps her, and takes all her money. Left with no choice but to accept her fate, Perlita works as a maid in the mansion of the Carbonels. By some twist of fate, the paths of former friends Perlita and Rodora cross again in the mansion. However, Giselle is now the wife of Ziggy, the son of Doña Charito, the matriarch of Carbonels. Unknown to Perlita, the beautiful wife of her boss is childhood best friend Rodora.

Soon after, Giselle and Perlita get pregnant at the same time. Giselle is anxious and concerned that her child will inherit her ugly features. And this situation will bring shame on her husband's family and will eventually reveal her true identity. Giselle's worst fears become reality when she gives birth to an ugly baby. Her world is shattered and she knows that her relationship with Ziggy is over. Perlita, on the other hand, is surprised with her cute and beautiful baby. But after giving birth, she passed out. Giselle learns from Aida, Ziggy's cousin, about Perlita's baby. Giselle conspires with Aida to switch her ugly baby with Perlita's child and in return, she will support her in the family business. Aida agrees and Giselle successfully covers up her identity and switches the two babies.

As years pass by, Perlita dutifully takes care of her daughter Marilyn while Giselle raises Darlene as her own child. Marilyn and Darlene become close despite their social status. But things will turn differently when Jerome, Aida's son, who has always defended Marilyn, will fall in love with Darlene. A love triangle ensues and Darlene and Marilyn are now rivals.

== Episodes ==
=== Season 1 ===
No.	Title	Original release date	Prod. code
1	"The Ugly Side of Life"	March 18, 2013	MMA1001
2	"The Ugly Side of Life"	March 19, 2013	MMA1001
3	"The Ugly Side of Life"	March 20, 2013	MMA1001
4	"The Ugly Side of Life"	March 21, 2013	MMA1001
5	"The Ugly Side of Life"	March 22, 2013	MMA1001
The series opens with Perlita and Rodora, best of friends, and their sufferings from incessant taunting and ridicule because of their ugly features. The two got separated and face their respective fates. Perlita works as a hired help in the Carbonel mansion, while Rodora works as a nursing aide under the wealthy spinster, Doña Carmen Atienza. When the old lady dies, she left all her wealth to Rodora. The latter uses it to go under the knife for a new face.
6	"Deceiving Beauty"	March 25, 2013	MMA1002
7	"Deceiving Beauty"	March 26, 2013	MMA1002
8	"Deceiving Beauty"	March 27, 2013	MMA1002
Perlita crosses paths again with her best friend Rodora, now known as Giselle, the wife of Ziggy Carbonel — Perlita's employer. Ziggy is completely unaware of Giselle's past. Giselle, on the other hand, will go to great lengths to protect her secrets. Soon after, Giselle and Perlita get pregnant at the same time. The former is anxious that her child will inherit her ugly features, and worst, might reveal her real identity. Her greatest fears become reality when she gives birth to an ugly baby girl. Meanwhile, Perlita gives birth to a beautiful baby girl (the baby's father is a half-Filipino, half-American guy who later dumped Perlita). Giselle conspires with Aida, Ziggy's cousin, to switch her ugly baby with Perlita's child.
9	"Switched Fate"	April 1, 2013	MMA1003
10	"Switched Fate"	April 2, 2013	MMA1003
11	"Switched Fate"	April 3, 2013	MMA1003
12	"Switched Fate"	April 4, 2013	MMA1003
13	"Switched Fate"	April 5, 2013	MMA1003
Years gone by, Perlita dutifully takes care of her daughter Marilyn while Giselle raises Darlene as her own child. At present, Perlita manages her own business – an eatery, while Marilyn is on her second year in college, taking Hotel and Restaurant Management course. Marilyn shares a very close relationship with her mother and strives hard to finish her studies. On the other hand, Darlene grew up spoiled and bratty. She used to getting what she wants, except for one thing—the love and affection of her mother, Giselle.
14	"Prince Charming"	April 8, 2013	MMA1004
15	"Prince Charming"	April 9, 2013	MMA1004
16	"Prince Charming"	April 10, 2013	MMA1004
17	"Prince Charming"	April 11, 2013	MMA1004
18	"Prince Charming"	April 12, 2013	MMA1004
One fateful night, while going home from school, Marilyn is attacked by two drunk men. Then a handsome guy comes to rescue her—Jerome Alvarez, her long-lost childhood best friend.
19	"The Real Daughter"	April 15, 2013	MMA1005
20	"The Real Daughter"	April 16, 2013	MMA1005
21	"The Real Daughter"	April 17, 2013	MMA1005
22	"The Real Daughter"	April 18, 2013	MMA1005
23	"The Real Daughter"	April 19, 2013	MMA1005
Perlita is diagnosed with Type 2 diabetes. This leads Marilyn to work—without Perlita’s approval—under Giselle as a personal assistant. Giselle on the other hand, welcomes the idea that she will see her "real" daughter regularly and help her in her needs—realizing how lucky Perlita is for having Marilyn as a daughter. At the same time, she feels pity for herself and Darlene for having a turbulent relationship.
24	"Blood Ties"	April 22, 2013	MMA1006
25	"Blood Ties"	April 23, 2013	MMA1006
26	"Blood Ties"	April 24, 2013	MMA1006
27	"Blood Ties"	April 25, 2013	MMA1006
28	"Blood Ties"	April 26, 2013	MMA1006
Darlene can't help but notice the special closeness and the overwhelming attentions of Giselle to Marilyn. This issue will also cause misunderstanding between Perlita and Marilyn, later on. Aida, on the other hand, advises Giselle to stop treating Marilyn as her daughter, instead put all her attentions to her "daughter" Darlene.
29	"Marilyn's Well-Kept Secret"	April 29, 2013	MMA1007
30	"Marilyn's Well-Kept Secret"	April 30, 2013	MMA1007
31	"Marilyn's Well-Kept Secret"	May 1, 2013	MMA1007
32	"Marilyn's Well-Kept Secret"	May 2, 2013	MMA1007
33	"Marilyn's Well-Kept Secret"	May 3, 2013	MMA1007
Marilyn—drunk and out of her mind—accidentally revealed her true feelings for Jerome, much to Darlene's utter shock and dismay. The following day, Darlene confronts Marilyn about last night's revelations. The confrontation ends with Marilyn promising that she will help Darlene to patch things up with Jerome.
34	"Broken"	May 6, 2013	MMA1008
35	"Broken"	May 7, 2013	MMA1008
36	"Broken"	May 8, 2013	MMA1008
37	"Broken"	May 9, 2013	MMA1008
38	"Broken"	May 10, 2013	MMA1008
Jerome plans of putting up his own restaurant so he could prove to the Carbonels that he is worthy of his girlfriend Darlene's love. Darlene patched things up with Marilyn and asked her to accompany her to a friend's party. Unknown to Marilyn, Darlene, has a nasty plan: she will humiliate Marilyn at the party by showing everyone a video that was taken when Marilyn was drunk. In the video, the obviously intoxicated Marilyn repeatedly expressed her love for Jerome. Meanwhile, Doña Charito hired a detective to spy on Giselle and Aida and find out what they are up to. Marilyn goes to the party with Jerome and Darlene. When they arrive at the venue, Marilyn's video was projected on a large screen. Marilyn could not believe what has happened and Jerome was equally shocked. Humiliated, Marilyn walks out of the party and Jerome and Darlene followed her. After learning that everything was Darlene's plan, Jerome chided her girlfriend telling her she shouldn't have done what she's done because Marilyn was not conscious when she said that she's in love with him. But Jerome is surprised when Marilyn admits the truth.
39	"Ghosts from the Past"	May 14, 2013	MMA1009
40	"Ghosts from the Past"	May 15, 2013	MMA1009
41	"Ghosts from the Past"	May 16, 2013	MMA1009
42	"Ghosts from the Past"	May 17, 2013	MMA1009
Perlita accidentally overhears conversation between Giselle and her former surgeon, Dr. Ron Reyes (Leandro Baldemor), and finds out the truth about Giselle's real identity. Despite her denial that she is not Rodora, Giselle cannot stop herself anymore from visiting her very ill father in the hospital. During her visit, she witnesses with her own eyes her father's death. Giselle is devastated and Perlita immediately comforts her and calls her using the name Rodora. Giselle acknowledges Perlita and confesses the truth about her identity. She is deeply worried that Ziggy and Doña Charito will discover the truth because Dr. Reyes, the surgeon who did her beautiful face, is blackmailing her and wants to work in their company.
43	"Web of Treachery and Revenge"	May 20, 2013	MMA1010
44	"Web of Treachery and Revenge"	May 21, 2013	MMA1010
45	"Web of Treachery and Revenge"	May 22, 2013	MMA1010
46	"Web of Treachery and Revenge"	May 23, 2013	MMA1010
47	"Web of Treachery and Revenge"	May 24, 2013	MMA1010
Jerome's effort to have a successful launch for his restaurant are sabotaged by Doña Charito. This reaches Aida's boiling point that ended up into a major fight between her and Doña Charito. Days passed, Aida once again blackmails Giselle for ten million pesos, but the latter refuses to give in. The next thing, Aida finds herself behind bars after Giselle twisted a story and accused Aida of forging her signature to steal money from the company fund. To get even, Aida reveals to Perlita the truth about Darlene and Marilyn's identity. Although in doubt, Aida's shocking revelation leads Perlita to investigate and later discovered the painful truth!
48	"The Lies, the Truth and the Complications"	May 27, 2013	MMA1011
49	"The Lies, the Truth and the Complications"	May 28, 2013	MMA1011
50	"The Lies, the Truth and the Complications"	May 29, 2013	MMA1011
51	"The Lies, the Truth and the Complications"	May 30, 2013	MMA1011
52	"The Lies, the Truth and the Complications"	May 31, 2013	MMA1011
Perlita is very upset with Rodora/Giselle for deceiving her and she feels robbed over all those years of being separated from her real daughter. Perlita is clueless for what will happen next; she doesn’t want to give up Marilyn but she can't help but think of her real daughter Darlene. On the other hand, Jerome fails to free Aida because Giselle files a heavier case against her. Left with no choice, he will approach the Carbonels to withdraw the case. Ziggy will agree to his plea if Jerome will do his one condition — to stay away from Darlene. Meanwhile, Perlita decides to meet up with Giselle to confront her. Giselle’s worst fears are realized when Perlita tells her she finally knows that she conspired with Aida to switch their babies. Giselle is shocked but nonetheless, she admits to Perlita the truth. Their meeting ends in a physical confrontation with Perlita demanding Giselle to have her daughter back.
53	"Raging Heart"	June 3, 2013	MMA1012
54	"Raging Heart"	June 4, 2013	MMA1012
55	"Raging Heart"	June 5, 2013	MMA1012
56	"Raging Heart"	June 6, 2013	MMA1012
57	"Raging Heart"	June 7, 2013	MMA1012
Darlene overhears Giselle and Perlita arguing, and here she discovers the truth about her real identity. It further propels her antagonism towards Marilyn whom she blamed for all the misfortunes and agonies she recently experiences. In one incident, Darlene forces Perlita to choose between her and Marilyn. Perlita, on the other hand, rejects the idea of choosing and losing anyone of them. Filled with hurt and anger, thinking that her own mother chooses Marilyn over her, Darlene decides to go back to the Carbonels and vows to seek revenge on those who caused her pain.
58	"The Real Carbonel"	June 10, 2013	MMA1013
59	"The Real Carbonel"	June 11, 2013	MMA1013
60	"The Real Carbonel"	June 12, 2013	MMA1013
61	"The Real Carbonel"	June 13, 2013	MMA1013
62	"The Real Carbonel"	June 14, 2013	MMA1013
Little by little, Jerome develops romantic feelings for Marilyn, but still in denial about it. Meanwhile, Darlene reveals Marilyn and Harry's "fake relationship". Harry, on the other hand, tells Marilyn that he wants to continue being boyfriend to her—for real. But Marilyn decides "it would be best to remain friends". Aida—who wants to get even with the Carbonels—reveals to Marilyn the truth about her identity... that she is the real Carbonel and not Darlene!
63	"Friends in Love?!?"	June 17, 2013	MMA1014
64	"Friends in Love?!?"	June 18, 2013	MMA1014
65	"Friends in Love?!?"	June 19, 2013	MMA1014
66	"Friends in Love?!?"	June 20, 2013	MMA1014
67	"Friends in Love?!?"	June 21, 2013	MMA1014
Marilyn and Jerome find themselves in each other's arms as he professes his love for her. Marilyn is, of course, incredulous aware that she is miles in looks away from Darlene who is obsessed with Jerome. Still, Marilyn harbors resentment towards her biological mother, Giselle and her adoptive mother, Perlita.
68	"Reversal of Fate"	June 24, 2013	MMA1015
69	"Reversal of Fate"	June 25, 2013	MMA1015
70	"Reversal of Fate"	June 26, 2013	MMA1015
71	"Reversal of Fate"	June 27, 2013	MMA1015
72	"Reversal of Fate"	June 28, 2013	MMA1015
Doña Charito has begun looking at Darlene (previously her beloved granddaughter) as a parasite and tries to mend ways with Marilyn who has vowed not to embrace her being by birth a Carbonel. Darlene, on the other hand, also tries to win back Jerome to Marilyn's dismay. Meanwhile, Perlita needs surgery to remove the blood clot in her brain. Marilyn needs a large amount of money to pay for her operation. With even lesser options and no one else to turn to, Marilyn asks for Ziggy and Doña Charito's help. Ziggy agrees to lend her money, on the condition that Marilyn will leave Perlita.
73	"One Painful Decision"	July 1, 2013	MMA1016
74	"One Painful Decision"	July 2, 2013	MMA1016
75	"One Painful Decision"	July 3, 2013	MMA1016
76	"One Painful Decision"	July 4, 2013	MMA1016
77	"One Painful Decision"	July 5, 2013	MMA1016
With a heavy heart, Marilyn complies with Ziggy and Doña Charito's condition (to stay with them and abandon Perlita) just to save the life of her beloved adoptive mother. However, Marilyn's arrival in the resort brings trouble to Darlene. It further propels her antagonism towards her former best friend, and vows that she will do everything to get her out of the resort. Meanwhile, Ziggy reconciles with Giselle after a heart-to-heart conversation, realizes that even though she is a mess, he can't get over her. Doña Charito, on the other hand, continues to manipulate Marilyn; convincing her to go under the knife for a pretty face, which Marilyn strongly rebuffs.

=== Season 2 ===
No.	Title	Original release date	Prod. code
78	"Battles for Love and Acceptance"	July 8, 2013	MMA2017
79	"Battles for Love and Acceptance"	July 9, 2013	MMA2017
80	"Battles for Love and Acceptance"	July 10, 2013	MMA2017
81	"Battles for Love and Acceptance"	July 11, 2013	MMA2017
82	"Battles for Love and Acceptance"	July 12, 2013	MMA2017
Giselle goes to the resort to patch things up with Doña Charito, but the latter refuses. Meantime, Darlene takes care of Perlita but the latter—still devastated about Marilyn's decision to stay with the Carbonels—keeps her distance from her real daughter, causing Darlene to feel unwanted. On the other hand, Marilyn finally gives in to Doña Charito's request; regards that the "major makeover" is the best solution for her to be able to achieve her dreams and earn the respect and acceptance of other people. But things do not go as planned as Perlita stops her.
83	"Freak"	July 15, 2013	MMA2018
84	"Freak"	July 16, 2013	MMA2018
85	"Freak"	July 17, 2013	MMA2018
86	"Freak"	July 18, 2013	MMA2018
87	"Freak"	July 19, 2013	MMA2018
Marilyn figures in a vehicular accident while riding in a car driven by the drunken Darlene. After the freak accident, Darlene faces a legal battle as Doña Charito files a heavy case against her. Perlita approaches Doña Charito and Ziggy to withdraw the case, but the former will agree to her plea only if she surrenders all her rights as the surrogate mother of Marilyn. Left with no choice, Perlita complies with Doña Charito's condition. Soon after, Doña Charito takes Marilyn to the US to undergo reconstructive surgery.
88	"Ugly No More"	July 22, 2013	MMA2019
89	"Ugly No More"	July 23, 2013	MMA2019
90	"Ugly No More"	July 24, 2013	MMA2019
91	"Ugly No More"	July 25, 2013	MMA2019
92	"Ugly No More"	July 26, 2013	MMA2019
After six long months, Marilyn returns—and she is no longer the erstwhile ugly girl but a stunning beauty. Everybody, including Jerome and Darlene, are all astonished at Marilyn's lovely transformation. However, the rift between Marilyn and Jerome gets wider after Marilyn sees him with Darlene in the restaurant and gets jealous. Meantime, Darlene gets closer to her real mother, Perlita, and Marilyn also feels jealous about it.
93	"Unrequited Love"	July 29, 2013	MMA2020
94	"Unrequited Love"	July 30, 2013	MMA2020
95	"Unrequited Love"	July 31, 2013	MMA2020
96	"Unrequited Love"	August 1, 2013	MMA2020
97	"Unrequited Love"	August 2, 2013	MMA2020
Harry decides to end his "one-way" relationship with Marilyn, and advised her to "stay true to herself and follow her heart". In the meantime, Darlene talks to Jerome, pleading him to stop loving Marilyn and "take her back" instead, but Jerome—for the nth time—rejects her. Marilyn realizes Harry is right, that she should give herself and Jerome another chance
98	"Deception Continues"	August 5, 2013	MMA2021
99	"Deception Continues"	August 6, 2013	MMA2021
100	"Deception Continues"	August 7, 2013	MMA2021
101	"Deception Continues"	August 8, 2013	MMA2021
102	"Deception Continues"	August 9, 2013	MMA2021
Doña Charito, Ziggy and Giselle joined forces to sabotage Marilyn and Jerome's new-found bliss. And for the first phase of the plan, Doña Charito invited Jerome for dinner (which surprised Marilyn). During the dinner, Doña Charito attempted to undermine Jerome's "achievements" but since his restaurant is doing great, she ran out of things to throw at Jerome. The next day, Doña Charito talks to Darlene and asks her to join them in their "plan" of separating Jerome and Marilyn and she even offers her a huge amount of money. Though at first, Darlene is hesitant to accept the offer, however, she eventually accepts it after realizing that that's the best way to get even with Marilyn.
103	"Against All Odds"	August 12, 2013	MMA2022
104	"Against All Odds"	August 13, 2013	MMA2022
105	"Against All Odds"	August 14, 2013	MMA2022
106	"Against All Odds"	August 15, 2013	MMA2022
107	"Against All Odds"	August 16, 2013	MMA2022
After continuing to feud with each other, Marilyn and Darlene call a truce and resolve their friendship (with Marilyn completely unaware of the latter's true motive). Meanwhile, Jerome overhears Doña Charito spreading false rumors against his mother, Aida. He furiously confronts the old lady, which eventually leads to a misunderstanding between him and Marilyn. The "Carbonel's Barong & Filipiniana" fashion show serves as a backdrop for another series of dramatic events. While Jerome and Marilyn struggle to solve their disagreement, Darlene, on the other hand, sees this as an opportunity to put her evil plan into action.
108	"Betrayed"	August 19, 2013	MMA2023
109	"Betrayed"	August 20, 2013	MMA2023
110	"Betrayed"	August 21, 2013	MMA2023
111	"Betrayed"	August 22, 2013	MMA2023
112	"Betrayed"	August 23, 2013	MMA2023
Darlene talks to Jerome and, once again, finds herself begging for another "chance". But Jerome rejects her plea, humiliates her, and tells her to stay away from him. Plot thickens when Marilyn discovers that Giselle is actually the mastermind behind the "plan" to destroy her relationship with Jerome. Feeling betrayed and no one to turn to, Marilyn turned to Perlita for comfort. Perlita welcomes her wholeheartedly, much to Darlene's dismay.
113	"What Goes Around, Comes Around"	August 26, 2013	MMA2024
114	"What Goes Around, Comes Around"	August 27, 2013	MMA2024
115	"What Goes Around, Comes Around"	August 28, 2013	MMA2024
116	"What Goes Around, Comes Around"	August 29, 2013	MMA2024
117	"What Goes Around, Comes Around"	August 30, 2013	MMA2024
Bitterness, insecurities, dissatisfaction with her life, and Marilyn's presence, push Darlene to abandon Perlita. Still reeling from his doomed affair with Marilyn, Jerome meets Ria (played by Arnee Ross) and found a "friend" in her. In the meantime, guilt-ridden Giselle tries to convince Marilyn to go home but the latter refuses—much to her dismay. On the other hand, Ziggy struggles to save their businesses on the verge of bankruptcy — and Doña Charito, upon finding out the "very bad news" is horrified. She decides to sell the resort (as her last option) just to save their "barong" business. Meanwhile, after [almost 20] years of absence in Perlita's life, George (the biological father of Darlene, played by Fabio Ide) shows up.
118	"The Beautiful Ending"	September 2, 2013	MMA2025
119	"The Beautiful Ending"	September 3, 2013	MMA2025
120	"The Beautiful Ending"	September 4, 2013	MMA2025
121	"The Beautiful Ending"	September 5, 2013	MMA2025
122	"The Beautiful Ending"	September 6, 2013	MMA2025
In a sudden reversal of fortune, Perlita is now living an extravagant life, thanks to her multi-millionaire fiancé, George — and Darlene goes about as usual with her loathsome self, mocking the family that raised her and Marilyn, who has also gone downhill with the Carbonel's riches now dissipated. Jerome, on the other hand, finds comfort with Ria, an amusing friend who easily wins his trust and affection. But the latter gives way after noticing that Jerome is indeed can't get over with Marilyn. Darlene's birthday celebration ends with an explosion—resulting to Perlita's tragic death. However, the said tragedy leads some warring characters to reconcile. George and Darlene decided to appoint Doña Charito and Aida to manage their resort. Meanwhile, Ziggy, Giselle and Marilyn decided to start a new life abroad. The finalé episode ends with Jerome and Marilyn at the airport... promising that they would love each other, forever.
