= Anna Karenina (2013 TV series) =

2013 Philippine television drama series

- Title card
- Genre: Drama
- Based on: Anna Karenina (1996) by R.J. Nuevas
- Written by: Leilani Chavez; John Borgy Danao; Mary Rose Colindres
- Directed by: Gina Alajar; Gil Tejada Jr.
- Starring: Krystal Reyes; Barbie Forteza; Joyce Ching
- Narrated by: Krystal Reyes as Anna; Barbie Forteza as Karen; Joyce Ching as Nina
- Theme music composer: Willy Cruz
- Opening theme: "Sana'y Wala Nang Wakas" by Rachelle Ann Go and La Diva
- Country of origin: Philippines
- Original language: Tagalog
- No. of episodes: 80

Production
- Executive producer: Rebya Upalda
- Camera setup: Multiple-camera setup
- Running time: 22–32 minutes
- Production company: GMA Entertainment TV

Original release
- Network: GMA Network
- Release: June 3 – September 20, 2013

Anna Karenina is a 2013 Philippine television drama series broadcast by GMA Network. The series is based on a 1996 Philippine television series of the same title. Directed by Gina Alajar and Gil Tejada Jr., it stars Krystal Reyes, Barbie Forteza and Joyce Ching all in the title role. It premiered on June 3, 2013, on the network's Telebabad line up. The series concluded on September 20, 2013, with a total of 80 episodes.

The series is streaming online on YouTube.

== Cast and characters ==
Cast

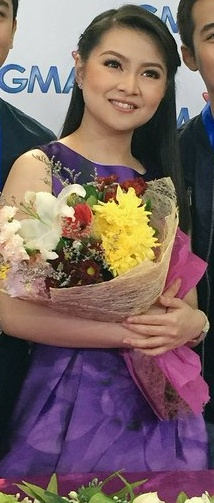
Barbie Forteza

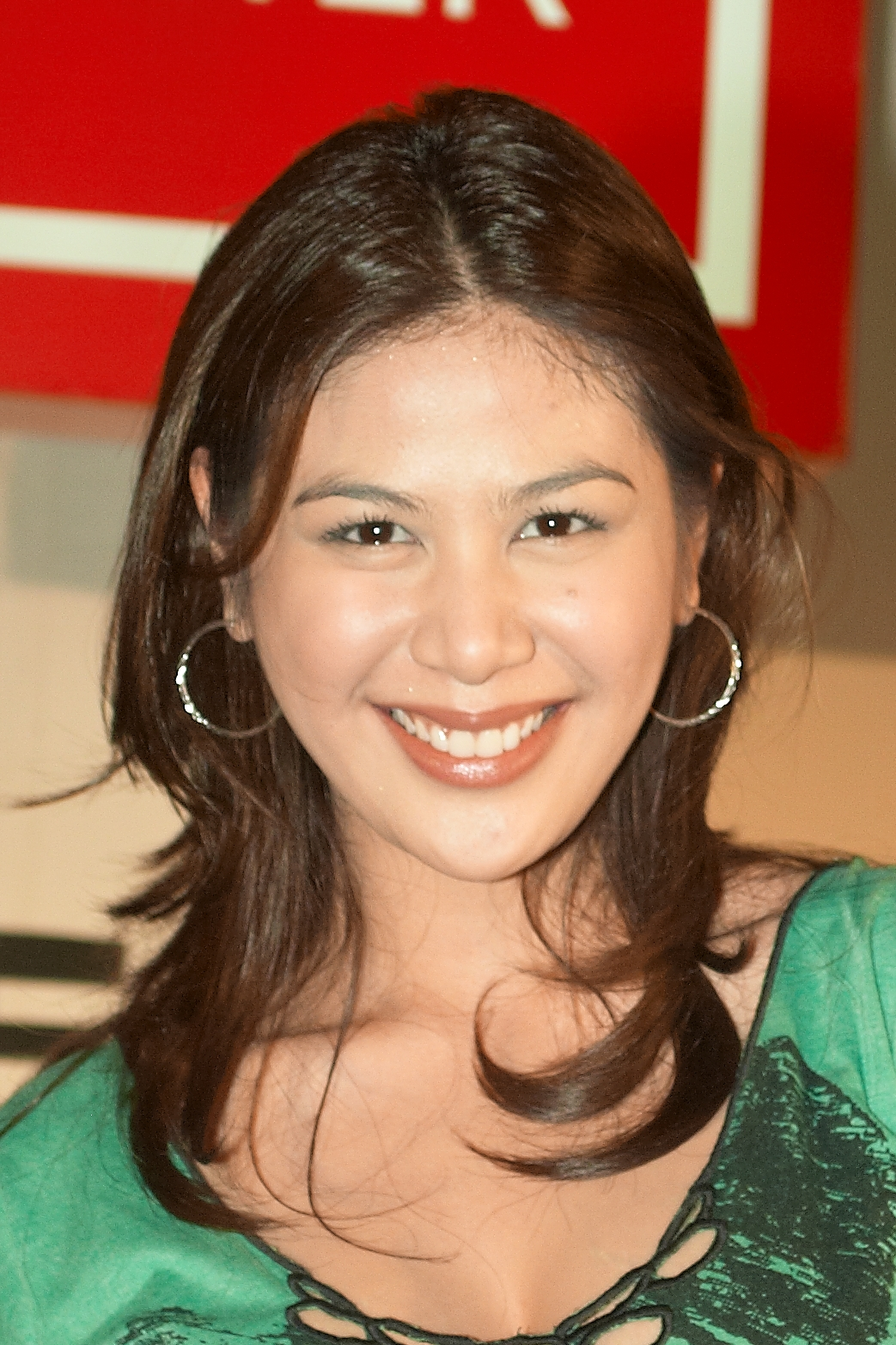
Valerie Concepcion

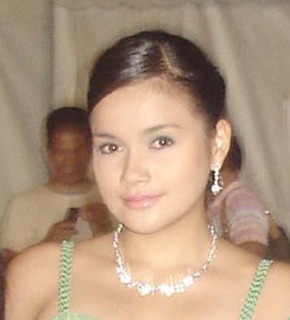
Yasmien Kurdi

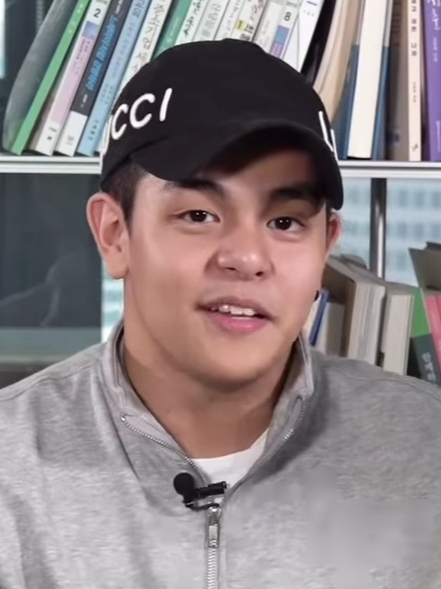
Julian Trono

Lead cast

- Krystal Reyes as Anna Karenina "Anna" Serrano/Anna Karenina "Anna" Monteclaro
- Barbie Forteza as Anna Karenina "Karen" Zamora / "Karen" Villarama
- Joyce Ching as Anna Karenina "Nina" Fuentebella / "Nina" Barretto

Supporting cast

- Yasmien Kurdi as Margarita "Maggie" C. Monteclaro
- Derrick Monasterio as Aldrin Monteclaro Barretto
- Julian Trono as Brix Manahan
- Hiro Peralta as Brian Manahan
- Sandy Andolong as Carmela Cruz-Monteclaro
- Juan Rodrigo as Xernan Monteclaro
- Yul Servo as Ricardo "Kadyo" Isidro
- Valerie Concepcion as Ruth Monteclaro-Barretto
- Neil Ryan Sese as Abel Barretto
- Allan Paule as Lucas Fuentebella
- Ana Roces as Dahlia "Daisy" Manahan
- Maybelyn Dela Cruz as Anaida "Nayda" Serrano
- Maureen Larrazabal as Suzana "Suzie" Zamora-Isidro
- Alicia Mayer as Bridgette Cruz-Fuentebella
- Kathleen Hermosa as Rebecca "Becky" Serrano
- Jhoana Marie Tan as Carla Monteclaro Barretto

Guest cast

- Thea Tolentino as Maria Angela "Angel" dela Cruz / "fake" Anna Karenina Monteclaro
- Isabel Granada as Alona Villarama
- Gabriel Roxas as Dindo / Dindi
- Chromewell Prince Cosio as Peter Calzado
- Dino Guevarra as Andres dela Cruz / "Fake" Brent Dizon
- Mymy Davao as Onay
- Rhen Escaño as Geleen
- Nicole Dulalia as Candice
- Yassi Pressman as Jenna Vera
- Teejay Marquez as Benjie
- Alicia Alonzo as Zenaida "Zeny" Cervantes
- Sunshine Dizon as Perlita Mendoza
- Shermaine Santiago as Glenda Caluya
- Aifha Medina as Rochelle

== Casting ==
In September 2013, actress Sunshine Dizon made an appearance as Perlita, who originated from the 2013 Philippine television drama series Mundo Mo'y Akin.

== Ratings ==
According to AGB Nielsen Philippines' Mega Manila household television ratings, the pilot episode of Anna Karenina earned a 22.5% rating. The final episode scored a 34.3% rating.

== Legacy ==
Actress Barbie Forteza appeared in the 2013 Philippine television drama series Mundo Mo'y Akin in a guest role, portraying the same character she played in Anna Karenina.
