= My Husband's Lover =

2013 Philippine television drama series

- Title card
- Genre: Romantic drama
- Created by: Suzette Doctolero
- Written by: Marlon Miguel; Geng Delgado; Jason Lim; Jonathan Cruz; Michelle Amog
- Directed by: Dominic Zapata
- Creative director: Jun Lana
- Starring: Dennis Trillo; Tom Rodriguez; Carla Abellana
- Theme music composer: Cecile Azarcon; Tata Betita
- Opening theme: "One More Try" (instrumental)
- Country of origin: Philippines
- Original language: Tagalog
- No. of episodes: 94

Production
- Executive producer: Carolyn B. Galve
- Production locations: Quezon City, Philippines; Subic, Zambales, Philippines
- Cinematography: Roman Theodossis
- Camera setup: Multiple-camera setup
- Running time: 30–45 minutes
- Production company: GMA Entertainment TV

Original release
- Network: GMA Network
- Release: June 10 – October 18, 2013

My Husband's Lover is a 2013 Philippine television drama romance series broadcast by GMA Network. The series is the first gay-themed drama series in Philippine television. Directed by Dominic Zapata, it stars Dennis Trillo in the title role, Tom Rodriguez and Carla Abellana. It premiered on June 10, 2013 on the network's Telebabad line up. The series concluded on October 18, 2013, with a total of 94 episodes.

The series is streaming online on YouTube.

== Premise ==
Vincent Soriano gets his girlfriend Lally pregnant while they were still in college. They marry and raise a family. While Vincent keeps a secret from his wife, he is gay. When Vincent's former male lover Eric returns to his life, they have an affair until Lally catches them.

== Cast and characters ==
Cast

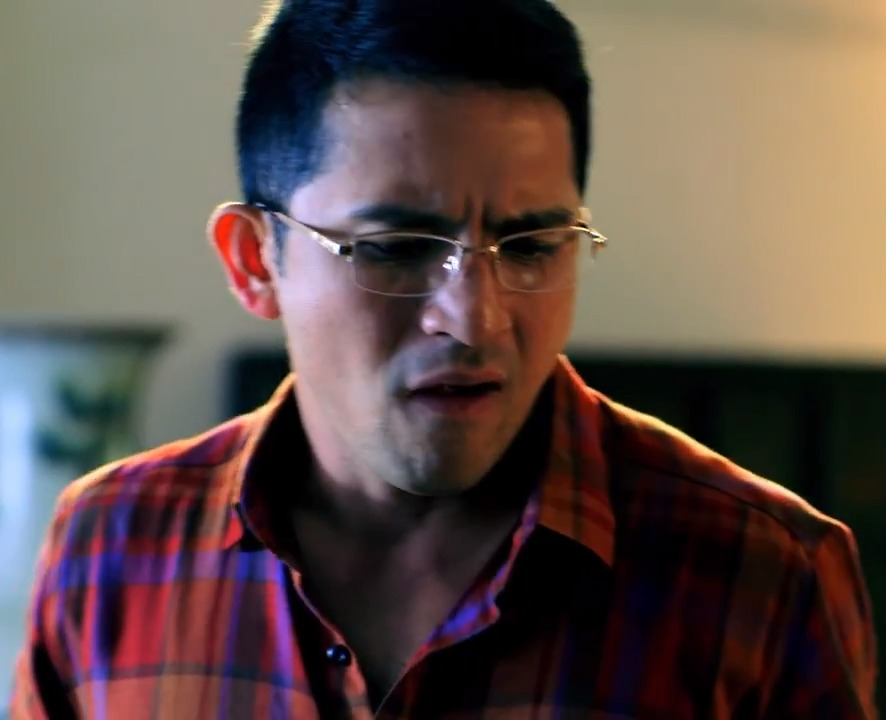
Dennis Trillo

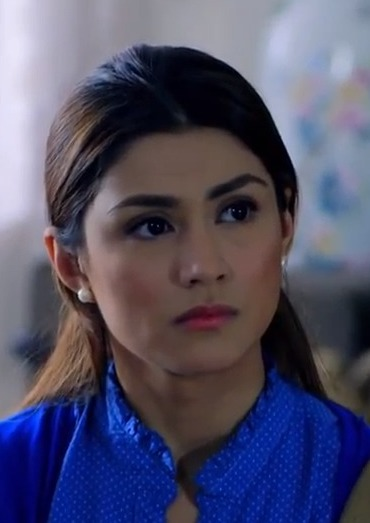
Carla Abellana

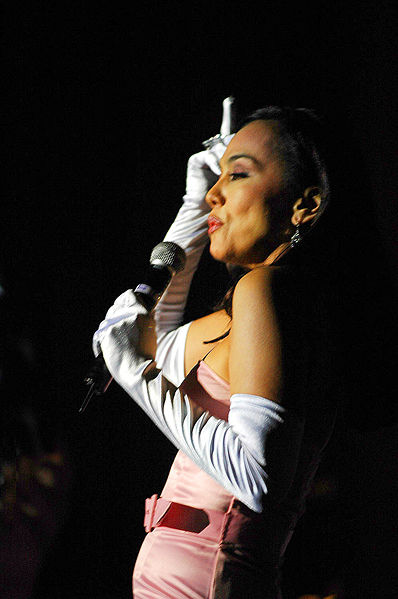
Kuh Ledesma

Lead cast

- Dennis Trillo as Enrico "Eric" del Mundo
- Tom Rodriguez as Vicente "Vincent" Soriano
- Carla Abellana as Eulalia "Lally" Agatep-Soriano

Supporting cast

- Pancho Magno as Paul Salcedo
- Bettina Carlos as Vicky Araneta
- Karel Marquez as Evelyn Agatep
- Kevin Santos as Danny
- Victor Basa as David
- Glydel Mercado as Sandra Agatep
- Chanda Romero as Sol del Mundo
- Roi Vinzon as Armando Soriano
- Kuh Ledesma as Elaine Soriano

Recurring cast

- Antone Limgenco as Diego "Diegs" Soriano
- Elijah Alejo as Hanna "Munchkin" Soriano

Guest cast

- Keempee de Leon as Zandro "Zsa Zsa" Soriano
- Rodjun Cruz as Martin Lizada
- Roy Alvarez as Manuel Soriano
- Mark Gil as Galo Agatep
- Chynna Ortaleza as Stella
- Ashley Cabrera as Mikaella
- Jaclyn Jose as Charito Vda. de Carbonel
- Ryan Agoncillo as Sam

== Development ==
"I'm sure a lot of people are gonna say a thing or two about the show. All I really have to say is, this show is a love story. And love is a beautiful thing and it shines through no matter age, no matter race, no matter color, and no matter gender preference. Love is love and no matter what package it comes in, it's still beautiful."
— Series' director, Dominic Zapata on the series' theme

Series' creator Suzette Doctolero began developing the series in early 2013, due to with her desire to create a non-traditional, out of the box yet has social relevance, truthful, emotional and with "real" characters stories. The idea for the series was conceived when Doctolero began thinking about the question: "What would you do if you find out that you husband is cheating on you with another man?." Doctolero stated that the series is "not all about the queerness of the characters and more of a love story and a family drama. When Doctolero presented the idea to the management of GMA Network, and immediately got a "yes" due to the concept being seen as interesting and the "relatability of the topic to the masses."

Carolyn Galve served as the executive producer of the series throughout its run. Dominic Zapata was hired as the director. Zapata said "It's very refreshing for me to direct this material. The subject is really sensitive. I want to be accurate in portraying how gay people are and the dynamics of gay relationships. I don't want to make a mistake or make a misrepresentation." Regarding the theme, Zapata stressed "I'm sure a lot of people are gonna say a thing or two about the show. All I really have to say is, this show is a love story. Love is a beautiful thing and it shines through no matter age, no matter race, no matter color, and no matter gender preference. Love is love and no matter what package it comes in, it's still beautiful."

The series' program manager, Helen Rose Sese clarified that the series would not delve on the sensual aspects of relationships—straight or not. "The show's intention is not to promote gay and lesbian relationship, but more of a reflection that this is happening now. The creative team will also be under scrutiny to try and avoid noise on the part of religious groups. We make sure we don't go beyond anything that will offend them, as well as the gay community." Sese said that the network has informed the local censors' body on the potentially controversial series. The Movie and Television Review and Classification Board has shown understanding of their material and warned them to observe certain limitations in presenting delicate scenes for general viewership. The series has been approved without cuts by the MTRCB, with a Strong Parental Guidance rating.

A kissing scene between Rodriguez and Trillo was supposed to be included in the final episode. It was cut due to MTRCB's guidelines. The scene was later released in the series' DVD.

=== Casting ===
The series featured three main characters and nine supporting characters throughout its run. Dennis Trillo and Carla Abellana were the first two actors to be cast for the lead roles. Abellana was cast as Lally Agatep-Soriano, a woman who struggles to be the "perfect" wife for the husband she loves who is a closeted gay. Abellana described the series as "a risky project", she didn't have qualms accepting the role. She loves that the series encompasses a wider audience which include straight, gay, lesbian, married or single audience. Trillo was chosen to play Eric del Mundo, a gay architect and the lover of Lally's husband, Vincent Soriano. Trillo was originally cast as Vincent Soriano and decided to play Eric del Mundo instead.

Tom Rodriguez was chosen to portray Vincent Soriano, a closeted gay, from many actors who auditioned for the role. Rodriguez had to go through tests before being cast. He signed with GMA Network Inc. to appear in the series. During his audition, Rodriguez acted one scene—a break-up scene—with Trillo. Zapata described Rodriguez as "the perfect Vincent" among the many actors who auditioned for the role, said that "the others treated homosexuality as a disease, Tom interpreted it with so much understanding and that's what we're looking for." Rodriguez described his role as very complex and demanding as the whole conflict of the show lies in his character. Rodriguez said, to prepare for the project, he watched gay-themed films like Brokeback Mountain and Love of Siam and talked to people with similar stories. He also did research and found out that "homosexual love is not really different from a heterosexual one. Things are more difficult for them because of all the social biases that exist."

Singer Kuh Ledesma was signed on to portray Elaine Soriano, after reading the week one script. The role Armando Soriano was originally offered to Phillip Salvador and he turned it down. The role went to Roi Vinzon. Bettina Carlos was signed on to play the "young cougar" Vicky Araneta. Carlos described her role as "seemingly simple but a challenge to make the cougar come out and give life to a young cougar." Victor Basa originally auditioned for the role of Vincent Soriano, and later ended up portraying David, Vincent's gay friend and former lover. Basa found his role "quite difficult" in the sense that he doesn't want his character to look "stereotype" and just like any other homosexual role seen in media.

Actress Jaclyn Jose made an appearance as Charito, who originated from the 2013 Philippine television drama series Mundo Mo'y Akin.

== Production ==
Principal photography commenced on May 21, 2013. Many of the scenes were filmed on location in Quezon City. Filming concluded in October 2013. The series was designed for a sixteen-week run. It was later extended for additional three weeks, and concluded in October 2013.

== Music ==
The theme song of My Husband's Lover is "One More Try" by Kuh Ledesma. Used in the opening and ending credits of the series, the song was written by composer Cecile Azarcon. It was released in 1984 and part of the album I Think I'm in Love from Blackgold Records.

Another featured song was "Help Me Get Over" by Jonalyn Viray. Written by Tata Betita, it is under Viray's self-titled extended play Jonalyn Viray, released on May 19, 2013. Other featured songs include "Sabihin Mo Naman" by Kris Lawrence and composed by Lawrence and Noah Zuniga; and "Ayoko Na" by Jessa Zaragoza, composed by Dingdong Avanzado.

== Reception ==
=== Ratings ===
According to AGB Nielsen Philippines' Mega Manila household television ratings, the pilot episode of My Husband's Lover earned a 22.8% rating. The final episode scored a 25.3% rating.

=== Critical response ===
The series garnered a positive response from professional critics, noting network's move in producing an "out-of-the-box" television series. The show was featured on June 17, 2013 issue of UK-based LGBT global news website Gay Star News. It noted that the first episode of My Husband's Lover for its "mature, nuanced and honest depiction of gay characters."

Walden Sadiri M. Belen of Manila Bulletin responded well to the story, the ensemble's performances, and the director, said that "the story, unconventional and provocative as it is, was treated beautifully and convincingly. The subject matter — a married man and a father having an affair with another man — could be controversial considering the relatively conservative nature of Filipinos, but so far the series have been decent in presentation and treatment which is fast-paced too. And most noticeable was the remarkable portrayal of the main cast in their respective roles [...]. They are credible in their performances, and especially noted was Tom Rodriguez's portrayal of a closet gay who is, ironically, the son of an army general. All the other members of the cast also delivered A-1 performances: Kuh Ledesma, Victor Basa, Glydel Mercado and Karel Marquez." Manila Bulletin's Mr. Fu said the series was "beautiful, moving, interesting and promising. It has very interesting characters played by credible actors [...]. Carla Abellana, for one, is able to make audiences feel her love for her mother and husband in the story. She has this very fresh television presence, that you would love to watch her every now and then. Trillo has already proven his acting talent and he does not fail on this show. A best example of a cute "gay who is not so gay", he knows when to use his eyes, his mouth, his whole body to portray the "gayness". Tom, on the other hand, can portray that "paminta" transl. pepper (closeted gay) character with confidence, and charm that makes him appealing on screen. Their on-cam chemistry also makes them effective in their roles. The way they trade lines is believable and their body language seems very natural. Their "revolving glass door" scene where they accidentally meet after years of not communicating was so romantic and intense."

Journal's Butch Roldan said that "the series explains in a broad spectrum that love cannot be defined by sexual preference alone, that love has its own understanding of what is right and wrong and is ready to suffer even under very harsh circumstances."Journal's entertainment columnist, Mario Bautista gave it a mixed review, said that "the series should have started in the thick of things, since the title and the trailers have already shown where the story is going. Trillo should have been there from the start and then they just go back to how the story all started."

Television and film director Jose Javier Reyes congratulated the network "for taking a risk and giving a fresh take on the tired templates of the telenovelas for something new."

Book author, Raymond Alikpala said "GMA Network deserves congratulations for daring to go down this road less travelled. Eschewing the stereotypical storylines and cardboard cliché characters, the writers of My Husband's Lover are depicting homosexual persons as no different from heterosexuals, which is radical in these parts. Homosexual characters have long been television staples, but they have been limited to supporting roles and comic relief. The series' non-stereotypical depiction of gay men can accomplish what Ladlad failed to do, which is to bring LGBT awareness into the mainstream of Filipino consciousness. Positive media depictions of LGBT persons are crucial in encouraging greater acceptance and recognition of our fundamental equality."

Allan Diones of Abante Tonite said that "Trillo and Tom Rodriguez has good screen chemistry [and] they are both excellent actors and can feel the emotions of their characters."

PEP's Mark Angelo Ching said Suzette Doctolero and Dominic Zapata for "how the series looks polished. It feels like a lot of brainpower went into the preparation of the show. Some elements are borderline meticulous, like choosing to add a variety of gay characters to battle the gay stereotype head-on." He even added that "unlike other series that only depicts homosexual men as lustful beasts, or as sidekicks in crass, laughable situations, the series shows its gay characters in normal, everyday situations: going to the gym, working in an office or relaxing at home. The characters have successful lives not as beauticians or stand-up comedians, but as architects and businessmen." Closing the review, he further added that the series is "progressive—a unique creation in today's media landscape where gay men are mostly relegated as sidekicks who provide comic relief. Let's hope that the series continues to present homosexuals far from their cliché images on television."

The series was under the scrutiny of the Catholic Bishops' Conference of the Philippines - Episcopal Commission on Youth's Conegundo Garganta. He stated that television producers and writers should study themes being shown to the viewers, especially to the younger ones and should be based on moral standards. In response to the CBCP statement, the Malacañang and MTRCB urged viewers to report any complaints about the series if they saw any unacceptable content against its SPG television rating. GMA Network responded that they would continue to comply with MTRCB policies.

On July 19, 2013, the House of Representatives of the Philippines held a "mock" session for the new representatives regarding investigating the possible ending of the series. On August 8, 2013, Albay - 1st District representative Edcel Lagman filed the House Bill 2352 in the 16th Congress. Labeled as the "My Husband's Lover bill", it aimed to expand the scope of Article 333 of the Revised Penal Code which imposes punishment for a spouse having a sexual intercourse to another person of the opposite sex, other than their husband and wife. With the bill, it would add same-sex adultery to "provide equality" in the society.

== Accolades ==
Accolades received by My Husband's Lover
| Year | Award | Category | Recipient | Result | Ref. |
|---|---|---|---|---|---|
| 2013 | White Party Manila / Malate Business Association | Plaque of Appreciation | My Husband's Lover | Won | |
| 2013 | 27th PMPC Star Awards for Television | Best Drama Actor | Dennis Trillo Tom Rodriguez | Nominated | |
| 2013 | 27th PMPC Star Awards for Television | Best Drama Actress | Carla Abellana | Nominated | |
| 2013 | 27th PMPC Star Awards for Television | Best Drama Supporting Actress | Glydel Mercado | Nominated | |
| 2013 | 27th PMPC Star Awards for Television | Best Drama Supporting Actor | Roi Vinzon | Nominated | |
| 2013 | 27th PMPC Star Awards for Television | Best Primetime Drama Series | My Husband's Lover | Nominated | |
| 2014 | 12th Gawad Tanglaw Awards | Best Ensemble Performance (TV series) | My Husband's Lover | Won | |
| 2014 | 5th Golden Screen TV Awards | Outstanding Original Drama Program | My Husband's Lover | Won | |
| 2014 | 5th Golden Screen TV Awards | Outstanding Performance by an Actress in a Drama Series | Carla Abellana | Won | |
| 2014 | 5th Golden Screen TV Awards | Outstanding Performance by an Actor in a Drama Series | Dennis Trillo Tom Rodriguez | Won | |
| 2014 | 5th Golden Screen TV Awards | Outstanding Performance by an Actor in a Drama Series | Dennis Trillo Tom Rodriguez | Nominated | |
| 2014 | 5th Golden Screen TV Awards | Outstanding Supporting Actress in a Drama Program | Glydel Mercado | Won | |
| 2014 | 5th Golden Screen TV Awards | Outstanding Supporting Actor in a Drama Program | Kevin Santos | Won | |
| 2014 | 5th Golden Screen TV Awards | Outstanding Supporting Actor in a Drama Program | Roi Vinzon | Nominated | |
| 2014 | Pepsters' Choice Awards | Primetime Teleserye of the Year | My Husband's Lover | Nominated | |
| 2014 | Pepsters' Choice Awards | Male TV Star of the Year | Dennis Trillo | Nominated | |
| 2014 | Pepsters' Choice Awards | Female TV Star of the Year | Carla Abellana | Nominated | |
| 2014 | Pepsters' Choice Awards | Breakout Star of the Year | Tom Rodriguez | Won | |
| 2014 | Pepsters' Choice Awards | Celebrity Pair of the Year | Dennis Trillo, Tom Rodriguez | Won | |
| 2014 | Editors' Choice Awards | TV show of the Year (Primetime) | My Husband's Lover | Won | |
| 2014 | Editors' Choice Awards | Breakout Star of the Year | Tom Rodriguez | Won | |
| 2014 | 42nd International Emmy Awards | Best Telenovela | My Husband's Lover | Nominated | |
| 2014 | 19th Asian Television Awards | Best Actor in a Lead Role | Dennis Trillo | Highly Commended | |
| 2014 | 19th Asian Television Awards | Best Direction | Dominic Zapata | Nominated | |

== Concert ==
A concert for the show, One More Try: My Husband's Lover The Concert was held on October 12, 2013 at the Araneta Coliseum, Quezon City. It was broadcast in television by GMA Network on October 20, 2013. According to AGB Nielsen Philippines' Mega Manila household ratings, the television broadcast of One More Try: My Husband's Lover The Concert earned an 11.9% rating.
