= Umulan Man o Umaraw =

2000 Philippine television drama series

- Title card
- Also known as: Seasons of Love
- Genre: Romantic drama
- Created by: Dode Cruz
- Directed by: Louie Ignacio
- Starring: Angelika Dela Cruz; Sunshine Dizon; KC Montero
- Theme music composer: Louie Ignacio
- Opening theme: "Umulan Man o Umaraw" by Angelika Dela Cruz
- Country of origin: Philippines
- Original language: Tagalog
- No. of episodes: 13

Production
- Executive producer: Lilybeth G. Rasonable
- Camera setup: Multiple-camera setup
- Running time: 60 minutes
- Production company: GMA Entertainment TV

Original release
- Network: GMA Network
- Release: June 5 – August 28, 2000

Umulan Man o Umaraw (transl. rain or shine / international title: Seasons of Love) is a 2000 Philippine television drama romance series broadcast by GMA Network. The series is the third installment of GMA Mini-Series. Directed by Louie Ignacio, it stars Angelika Dela Cruz, KC Montero and Sunshine Dizon. It premiered on June 5, 2000. The series concluded on August 28, 2000.

== Cast and characters ==
Lead cast

- Angelika Dela Cruz as Andrea
- Sunshine Dizon as Rebecca
- KC Montero as Jason

Supporting cast

- Wowie de Guzman as Manuel
- Eddie Gutierrez as Rafael
- Ali Sotto as Karina
- Amy Austria as Chona
- Gabby Eigenmann as Nick
- Trina Zuñiga as Arlene

Guest cast

- Evangeline Pascual as Sylvana
- Anna Marin as Rhodora
- Sheila Mercado as Angie
- Ryan Serrano as Mike
