= Delivery Boi =

Philippine television drama series

- Title card
- Genre: Comedy drama
- Directed by: Adolfo Alix Jr.; Dominic Zapata
- Starring: Will Ashley
- Country of origin: Philippines
- Original language: Tagalog
- No. of episodes: 25

Production
- Camera setup: Multiple-camera setup
- Production company: GMA Entertainment Group

Original release
- Network: GMA Network
- Release: October 19, 2026 – present

Delivery Boi is a Philippine television drama comedy series broadcast by GMA Network. Directed by Adolfo Alix Jr. and Dominic Zapata, it stars Will Ashley in the title role. It premiered on October 19, 2026, on the network's Afternoon Prime line up.

The series is streaming online on YouTube.

== Premise ==
Boi, a dyslexic delivery rider aspires to achieve his dreams including meeting his biological father, while taking on daily road challenges.

== Cast and characters ==
Cast

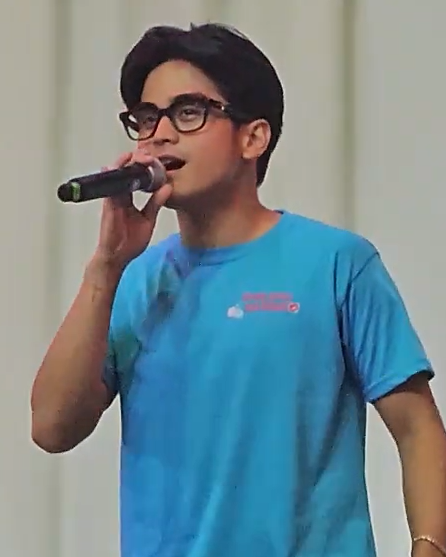
Will Ashley

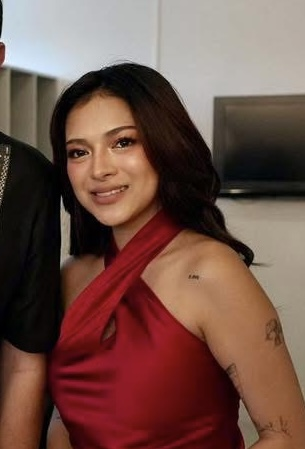
Mika Salamanca

Lead cast

- Will Ashley as Robert "Boi" Ragasa

Supporting cast

- Eric Quizon
- Yasser Marta
- Meryll Soriano
- Maricar de Mesa
- Keempee de Leon
- Gio Alvarez
- Mika Salamanca
- Vince Maristela
- Mikoy Morales
- Angeli Nicole Sanoy
- Juharra Asayo
- Baninay Bautista

== Production ==
The series, its directors–Adolfo Alix Jr. and Dominic Zapata and its cast members were announced in May 2026. Principal photography commenced in August 2026. The cast members underwent a "safety in riding" seminar in preparation for their roles.

== Release ==
Delivery Boi is set to premiere on GMA Network on October 19, 2026. An advanced release is scheduled to be released on GMA Play, on October 17, 2026.

== Ratings ==
According to AGB Nielsen Philippines' Nationwide Urban Television Audience Measurement People in television homes, the pilot episode of Delivery Boi earned a 3.8% rating.
