= Dominic Zapata =

Filipino television and film director (born 1971)

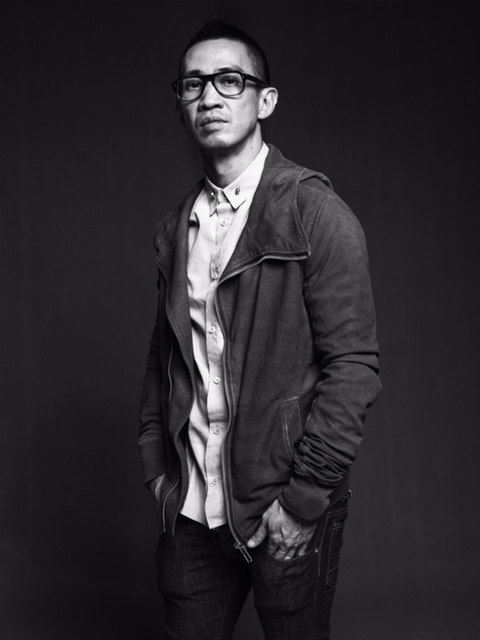
- Born: February 14, 1971 (age 55); Philippines
- Occupation: Director
- Years active: 1994–present
- Employer: GMA Network

Dominic Zapata (born February 14, 1971), is a Filipino television and film director. He is now one of the resident directors of GMA Network since 1997.

== Career ==
His most noted work is My Husband's Lover, nominated as Best Telenovela in the 2014 International Emmy Awards held at New York City. The same project also got him a nomination nod for Best Director at the Asian TV Awards in Singapore that same year.

Zapata first became known for directing large-scale soaps, namely Mar's Ravelo's Darna (both versions, first with Angel Locsin and the updated Marian Rivera starrer) and Captain Barbell. He showed his versatility with the musical soap, Diva. He did local adaptations of international titles like the Kim Samsoon (Korea), La Lola (Argentina), Zaido (Japan) and Zorro (US).

His Filipino version of the Korean drama, Temptation of Wife and My Beloved were aired in 2012 while Carmela: Ang Pinakamagandang Babae sa Mundong Ibabaw was aired in 2014. Then came the commercial and critical success of My Husband's Lover. Aside from television shows, Dominic directed films such as Kuya, Mulawin: The Movie, My Valentine Girl, and Boy Pick-up the Movie.

In 2005, he won the Metro Manila Film Festival People's Choice Award for Best Director for his work on Mulawin, the Movie. He also won five citations in the 5th Golden Screen TV Awards. He was nominated in the 2014 Asian Television Awards in the Best Direction category, nominated in the 9th Seoul International Drama Awards and also nominated for an International Emmy Award under the Telenovela category, given by the International Academy of Television Arts & Sciences.

== Filmography ==
Year	Title	Category
1994–1996	Music Bureau	Weekly Music-Oriented Show
1997–1999	T.G.I.S. Batch 2	Weekly Teen Drama
2000-2004	Click Batch 1 and 2	Weekly Teen Drama
2002–2003	Beh Bote Nga	TV Sitcom
2003	Love to Love	Anthology
2003–2008	Nuts Entertainment	Weekly Sketch Comedy
2003–2004	Twin Hearts	TV series
2004–2005	Mulawin	TV series
2004	Kuya	Movie
2005	Mars Ravelo's Darna	TV series
2005–2006	Sugo	TV series
2005	Mulawin: The Movie	Movie
2006–2007	Mars Ravelo's Captain Barbell	TV series
2007	Super Twins	TV series
2007–2008	Zaido: Pulis Pangkalawakan	TV series
2008	Ako si Kim Samsoon	TV series
2008	Obra	Weekly TV Anthology
2008–2009	LaLola	TV series
2009	Zorro	TV series
2009–2010	Mars Ravelo's Darna	TV series
2010	Diva	TV series
2010	Panday Kids	TV series
2010–2011	Comedy Bar	Weekly TV Comedy Variety
2010	JejeMom	Weekly TV Family Comedy
2010–2011	Grazilda	TV series
2011	My Valentine Girls	Movie
2011	Mars Ravelo's Captain Barbell	TV series
2012	My Beloved	TV series
2012	Luna Blanca	TV series
2012	Boy Pick-Up: The Movie	Movie
2012–2013	Temptation of Wife	TV series
2013	My Husband's Lover	TV series
2013	Magpakailanman	TV Anthology
2014	Carmela: Ang Pinakamagandang Babae sa Mundong Ibabaw	TV series
2014–2016	Ismol Family	Weekly TV Family Comedy
2014–2015	Hiram na Alaala	TV series
2015	The Rich Man's Daughter	TV series
2015–2016	MariMar	TV series
2016	That's My Amboy	TV series
2016	Poor Señorita	TV series
2016–2017	Alyas Robin Hood	TV series
2017	Mulawin vs. Ravena	TV series
2018	Victor Magtanggol	TV series
2019	Kara Mia	TV series
2020	Descendants of the Sun	TV series
2021–2022	The World Between Us	TV series
2022	Bolera	TV series
2022	Start-Up PH	TV series
2023	Hearts on Ice	TV series
2023	Royal Blood	TV series
2024	Pulang Araw	TV series
2025	My Father's Wife	TV series
2025	Akusada	TV series
2026	Never Say Die	TV series
2026–present	The Master Cutter	TV series
2026–present	Delivery Boi	TV series
2026	Red Crown	Movie

== Awards and nominations ==
Event	Award	Title
2006 New York Festivals	TV Programming & Promotion for Best Special Effects (TV-Movie/Mini-Series)	Mulawin
31st Metro Manila Film Festival	People’s Choice for Best Director	Mulawin the Movie
8th Seoul International Drama Awards	Programmer’s Choice for Best Drama Series	Temptation of Wife
5th Golden Screen Television Awards	Outstanding Adapted Drama Program	
2nd International Emmy Awards	Best Telenovela	My Husband's Lover
19th Asian Television Awards	Best Director- Nomination	
PEP List Editor's Choice Awards	TV Show of the Year	
5th Golden Screen Television Awards	Outstanding Original Drama Program	
31st PMPC Star Awards for Television	Best Primetime Drama Series	Alyas Robin Hood
