= Sunshine Dizon =

Filipina actress

- Born: Margaret Sunshine Cansancio Dizon; July 3, 1983 (age 43); Quezon City, Philippines
- Occupations: Actress; host; singer; television; director
- Years active: 1986–2010; 2012–present
- Agent(s): Viva Artists Agency; Freelancer (2021–present)
- Spouse: Timothy Tan (m. 2010; sep. 2016)
- Children: 2

Sunshine Dizon (born Margaret Sunshine Dizon-Tan on July 3, 1983, in Quezon City, Philippines;Tagalog pronunciation: [ˈdɪsɔn]), formerly credited with the mononym Sunshine, is a Filipino actress, director and producer. She is known primarily for her dramatic roles in television and film. At age 3, she made her screen debut in the film God's Little Children (1986) and won her first acting award at the FAMAS Award for Best Child Actress in 1995. A prominent figure in television, she received wider recognition for her performances in the succeeding years such as Umulan Man O Umaraw (2000), Kung Mawawala Ka (2002), Encantadia (2005), Bakekang (2006), Impostora (2007) and Ika-6 na Utos (2016). Among her acclaimed films include Sabel (2004), Mulawin: The Movie (2005), Hustisya (2014) and Rainbow's Sunset (2018).

== Early life ==
Margaret Sunshine Cansancio Dizon was born on July 3, 1983, to Isagani Bengzon Dizon and Dorothy Cansancio Dizon, in Quezon City. She is the youngest in her family. At a young age, her mother who was then a part of the Producers' Guild of the Philippines who used to produce films and TV shows noticed her interest in show business and would always tag her along on gatherings with other producers. She had a white pet dog during her childhood named Spencer.

== Career ==
=== Acting ===
Dizon started acting at the age of three, with her screen name being simply "Sunshine". The first film she starred in was God's Little Children.

She has already worked in Kung Kasalanan Man (1989), Hindi Pa Tapos ang Laban and Kahit Butas ng Karayom Papasukin Ko where she got her first acting recognition as Best Child Actress from FAMAS.

On television, she became a regular on Bubble Gang. She also became part of That's Entertainment for six months. After which, VIVA signed her and cast her in DATS.

She became part of the ABS-CBN drama anthology series Maalaala Mo Kaya, having a role on the episodes "Abaniko" (1992), "Palara" (1994), and "Latay" (1995).

She played one of the leads in the TV series Anna Karenina as well as on the cast of Thank God It's Sabado. She starred in Honey, My Love, So Sweet (1999) and Kiss Mo Ko (1999).

Dizon's films include Honey, My Love, So Sweet and Kiss Mo Ko.

Sunshine Dizon appeared in the television series, Anna Karenina.

In 2001, she starred in the prime-time television drama Ikaw Lang ang Mamahalin with Angelika Dela Cruz and later the soap opera Kung Mawawala Ka. She was cast in Masikip sa Dibdib (2004) and the TV sitcom Daboy en Da Girl (2002), Mga Batang Lansangan... Ngayon (2002), Filipinas (2003) and Sabel (2004). She also starred in the GMA mini-series Umulan Man o Umaraw and Tuwing Kapiling Ka.

She played Sang'gre Pirena in Encantadia for which she won two Best Actress Awards from ENPRESS and Gawad Amerika.

She appeared in the sitcom Bahay Mo Ba 'To? and Captain Barbell as well as the title role in Carlo J. Caparas' Bakekang, for which she received the Best Actress by PMPC Star Awards.

In Impostora, she played a dual role and later appeared in La Vendetta for GMA Network who signed her as an exclusive contract star. She was cast in the GMA Films' movie Dagaw and Sundo which to be aired in 2009.

In 2008, she starred in Obra. In 2009, Dizon started taping for All About Eve.

In 2012, Dizon briefly returned to Philippine television, appearing on Regine Velasquez-Alcasid's cooking/talk show Sarap Diva along with Katrina Halili. Later in 2013, Dizon has made her acting comeback via Mundo Mo'y Akin where she plays Perlita Mendoza. The appearance of Dizon's character in Mundo Mo'y Akin is quite similar to her previous titular role in Bakekang.

In 2016, Dizon was joining again in the retelling-sequel of Encantadia in which she plays Adhara. This also serves as her return in that said show but with a different role. But in the middle of the series, she left the production to be a part of the show Ika-6 na Utos where she played the role of Emma de Jesus, her most personal role. It started airing last December 5, 2016, which later got extensions proven to be with the ratings and viewers alike. And in 2019, she played Laura Ramirez-Santos in the series Magkaagaw.

After becoming a mainstay actor of GMA Network, she became a freelance actress on April 30, 2021, where she appeared on various ABS-CBN series such as Marry Me, Marry You and Pira-Pirasong Paraiso both produced by Dreamscape Entertainment despite its free TV shutdown. Dizon was also part of Mga Lihim ni Urduja aired on GMA.

== Personal life ==
In 2010, Dizon married a businessman Timothy Tan. However, after six years of marriage, they separated after Dizon learned that her husband had an affair with another woman. Although they did not file for an annulment, the two has remained civil with each other, and are now co-parenting their two children.

=== Directing ===
In 2016, Dizon made her directorial debut as an in-house television director of the weekend programs produced by 8TriMedia Broadcasting Network through its television channel 8TriTV on CableLink Channel 7.

== Filmography ==
=== Film ===
Year	Title	Role	Notes	Source
1986	God's Little Children	Anna		
1986	Salamangkero	Freza		
1988	Angelica: Sugo sa Lupa	Angelica		
1988	Guhit ng Palad	Sunshine Salvador		
1988	One Day, Isang Araw	Sunshine		
1988	Sheman: Mistress of the Universe	Prinsesa Aliksha		
1988	Patrolman			
1989	Si Malakas, at si Maganda	Young Anna		
1989	Florencio Diño: Public Enemy No. 1 of Caloocan			
1989	Tatak ng Isang Api			
1989	Bote, Dyaryo, at Garapa			
1989	Kung Kasalanan Man	Yvette		
1989	Pulis, Pulis sa Ilalim ng Tulay	Liza		
1989	Huwag Kang Hahalik sa Diablo	Kulit		
1991	Kapitan Jaylo: Batas sa Batas	Baby		
1993	Silang Mga Sisiw sa Lansangan	Teresa		
1994	Kadenang Bulaklak	Young Jasmine		
1995	The Jessica Alfaro Story	Jessica's daughter		
1995	Kahit Butas ng Karayom	Mimi		
1999	Hindi Pa Tapos ang Laban			
1999	Honey, My Love, So Sweet	Liza		
1999	Kiss Mo Ko	Dindi		
2002	Mga Batang Lansangan Ngayon	Alma		
2003	Filipinas	Diana		
2004	Kilig... Pintig... Yanig	Natasha		
2004	Masikip sa Dibdib	Brigitte		
2004	Sabel	Toni	Uncredited	
2005	Mulawin The Movie	Sang'gre Pirena	Also producer (as My Own Womann)	
2009	Sundo	Louella		
2014	Kamkam	Elaine		
2014	Hustisya	Lorena		
2016	Fruits N' Vegetables: Mga Bulakboleros	Female Principal		
2016	Sekyu			
2018	Rainbow's Sunset	Marife		
2019	Mystified	Althea		
2021	Versus	Baby		
2023	Becky and Badette	Working Girl 3		
2024	Sunny	Gwen		

=== Television / Digital Series ===
Year	Title	Role	Ref.
1996–2002	Anna Karenina	Anna Karenina "Karen" Villarama	
1997–1999	T.G.I.S.	Carla "Calai" Escalante (Second Batch Cast)	
2000	Umulan Man o Umaraw	Rebecca	
2000	Kakabakaba (Episode: The Dormitory)		
2001–2002	Ikaw Lang ang Mamahalin	Clarissa Delos Santos	
2002–2003	Kung Mawawala Ka	Rosa Camilla Montemayor	
2002–2003	Kahit Kailan	Bettina De Guzman / Betchay	
2005	Encantadia	Sang'gre Pirena	
2005–2006	Now and Forever: Agos	Erika Arevalo	
2005–2006	Etheria: Ang Ikalimang Kaharian ng Encantadia	Sang'gre Pirena	
2006	Encantadia: Pag-ibig Hanggang Wakas	Sang'gre Pirena	
2006–2007	Mars Ravelo's Captain Barbell	Blanca / Clarissa Magtangol / Ex-O	
2006–2007	Carlo J. Caparas' Bakekang	Jacoba "Bakekang" Maisog	
2007	Impostora	Sara Carreon / Vanessa "Nessa" Cayetano	
2007–2008	La Vendetta	Eloisa Salumbides-Cardinale	
2007–2008	Carlo J. Caparas' Kamandag	Reyna Ragona	
2009	All About Eve	Erika Alegre Reyes	
2009	Sine Novela: Tinik Sa Dibdib	Lorna Yadao-Domingo (within 3 weeks)	
2013	Mundo Mo'y Akin	Perlita Mendoza (Cross-over Character / Special Participation)	
2013	Anna Karenina	Perlita Mendoza (Cross-over Character / Special Participation)	
2013–2014	Villa Quintana	Iluminada "Lumeng" Digos-Samonte	
2014–2015	Strawberry Lane	Elaine Tolentino-Morales	
2015	Pari 'Koy	Noemi Espiritu-Cruz	
2015–2016	Little Nanay	Helga Vallejo-Cubrador	
2016	Encantadia	Sang'gre Adhara	
2016–2018	Ika-6 na Utos	Emma D. De Jesus-Fuentabella	
2018	Kambal, Karibal	Maricar Akeem Nazar	
2018	Inday Will Always Love You	Martina Lazaro	
2019	Inagaw na Bituin	Belinda Lopez-Sevilla	
2019–2021	Magkaagaw	Laura Ramirez-Santos / Laura Ramirez-de Villa	
2021	It's Showtime	Herself / Guest Celebrity Player	
2021–2022	Marry Me, Marry You	Maria Pauleene "Paula" Justiniano	
2023	Magandang Buhay	Herself / Guest Ku-Momshie	
2023	Mga Lihim ni Urduja	Iris Dayanghirang	
2023–2024	Pira-Pirasong Paraiso	Rosalinda "Osang" Guinto-Abiog	

=== Drama anthologies ===
Year	Title	Role	Notes	Source
1992	Maalaala Mo Kaya		Episode: "Abaniko"	
1994	Maalaala Mo Kaya		Episode: "Palara"	
1995	Maalaala Mo Kaya		Episode: "Latay"	
2003	Love to Love	Lovely Santos	Episode: "Yaya Lovely"	
2004	Magpakailanman	Janice Jurado	Episode: "The Janice Jurado Story"	
2004	Magpakailanman	Amonita Balajadia	Episode: "Babangon Din Ang Kahapon"	
2004	Love to Love	Laura	Episode: "True Romance"	
2005	Magpakailanman	Monica Sison	Episode: "Silang Mga Inihabilin sa Langit"	
2008	Obra	Butch / Mira Bella Amor / Rosa		
2009	Dear Friend	Rachel	Episode: "Kay Tagal Kitang Hinintay"	
2010	Claudine	Melba	Episode: "Love Your Neighbor"	
2013	Magpakailanman	Lucy Aroma	Episode: "The Lucy Aroma Story"	
2013	Magpakailanman	Arlene Tolibas	Episode: "Isang Linggong Pag-ibig"	
2013	Magpakailanman	Love Añover	Episode: "Sa Mata ng Daluyong"	
2014	Magpakailanman	Lenly Bayabados	Episode: "Pinutol na Kaligayahan"	
2014	Magpakailanman	Susan	Episode: "Ang Paghihiganti ng Masamang Engkanto"	
2014	Magpakailanman	Lovely Pineda Ishii	Episode: "Ang Ina Sa Gitna ng Tsunami"	
2015	Karelasyon	Ria	Episode: "Daddy Santa"	
2015	Magpakailanman	Millete	Episode: "Ang Batang Isinilang Sa Bilangguan"	
2016	Dear Uge	Julieta	Episode: "My Husband's Ander"	
2016	Magpakailanman	Lisa	Episode: "The Abused Boy"	
2016	Dear Uge	Diane Vicencio	Episode: "Faking Girls"	
2016	Karelasyon	Mary	Episode: "Halloween Special"	
2017	Magpakailanman	Gee	Episode: "Best Sisters Forever"	
2018	Wagas Valentine's Special	Editha	Episode: "Mukha ng Pag-Ibig"	
2018	Dear Uge	Tess	Episode: "Hus Da Boss?"	
2018	Tadhana	Perlita	Episode: "Naulilang Ina"	
2018	Magpakailanman	Ayesa	Episode: "My Sister, My Mother"	
2018	Imbestigador	Jenaliz "Bajen" Niida	Episode: "Mastermind"	
2018	Tadhana	Marge	Episode: "Pinagsabay"	
2018	Dear Uge	Jane	Episode: "Pasiklaban sa lamayan"	
2018	Magpakailanman	Cynthia	Episode: "Ina, dapat ba kitang patawarin?"	
2019	Tadhana	Annie	Episode: "Chop Chop"	
2019	Dear Uge	Haya	Episode: "Ferpect Boyfriend"	
2019	Imbestigador	Maria Cristina Palanca	Episode: "Babae sa Lababo"	
2019	Wagas	July	Episode: "Throwback Pag-Ibig"	
2020	Tadhana	Bekang	Episode: "Magkano ang forever"	
2023	Wish Ko Lang!	Lea	Episode: "Sa Piling Mo"	

=== Comedy shows ===
Year	Title	Role	Notes
1995–2005	Bubble Gang	Various / Pirena	Episode: "Club Mwah!"
2002	Daboy en Da Girl	Baby	Supporting Cast
2004–2007	Bahay Mo Ba 'To?	Dorothy Benoit	Recurring Cast
2017	Pepito Manaloto	Rica	
2019	Daddy's Gurl	Demi Macaspac	Episode: "Amnesia Gurl"

=== Hosting ===
Year	Title	Role	Notes
1986	That's Entertainment	Herself / Performer / Host	Friday Group Member
1997	Jamming	Co-Host	
2009	SOP	Herself / Performer	
2009–2010	SOP Fully Charged	Co-Host	
2010–2013	Party Pilipinas	Herself / co-host	Performer
2013–2014	Mars	Temporary host	
2017	All Star Videoke	All Star Laglager	
2021	Magandang Buhay	Guest Ku-Momshie	

== Awards ==
Year	Nominee / work	Award	Result
2017	OFW GAWAD PARANGAL 2017	Best Actress Awardee for Ika6-Na Utos	—N/a
2017	16th Gawad Amerika Awards	Most Outstanding Filipina Actress in Television Awardee for Ika-6 Na Utos	—N/a
2016	30th PMPC Star Awards for TV	Best Supporting Actress Awardee for Little Nanay	—N/a
2015	63rd FAMAS	Best Supporting Actress Nomination for Hustisya	—N/a
2014	5th Golden Screen TV Awards	Outstanding Supporting Actress in a Drama Series Nomination for Mundo Mo'y Akin	—N/a
2009	23rd PMPC Star Awards for TV	Female Face of the Night winner	—N/a
2009	23rd PMPC Star Awards for TV	Best Single Performance by an Actress for "Obra Butch" episode-	—N/a
2009	SOP Tag Awards	Female Kapuso Fun Favorite Nominee	—N/a
2008	22nd PMPC Star Awards for TV	Best Actress Awardee for Impostora	—N/a
2007	21st PMPC Star Awards for TV	Best Actress Awardee for Bakekang	—N/a
2006	3rd Gawad Amerika Awards	Best Actress Awardee for Encantadia	—N/a
2006	20th PMPC Star Awards for TV	Best Drama Actress Nominee for Encantadia: Pag-ibig Hanggang Wakas	—N/a
2006	54th PMPC Star Awards for Movies	Best Supporting Actress Nomination for Mulawin The Movie	—N/a
2006	USTv Students' Choice Awards	Students' Choice for Best Actress Nominee for Encantadia	—N/a
2005	18th PMPC Star Awards for TV	Best Single Performance by an Actress Nominee for Magpakailanman: Silang Mga Inihabilin ng Langit	—N/a
2005	2nd ENPRESS Golden Screen Entertainment TV Awards	Outstanding Lead Actress in a Drama Series Awardee for Encantadia	—N/a
2005	Kapuso's Viewers Choice Awards	Idol Mong Anti-Bida Nominee for Encantadia	—N/a
2005	53rd PMPC Star Awards for Movies	Best Supporting Actress Nominee for Sabel	—N/a
2005	53rd FAMAS Awards	Best Supporting Actress Nominee for Sabel	—N/a
2005	Film Academy of the Philippines Awards	Best Supporting Actress Nominee for Sabel	—N/a
2005	Metro Manila Film Festival	Best Supporting Actress Nominee for Sabel	—N/a
2004	1st ENPRESS Golden Screen Entertainment TV Awards	Outstanding Lead Actress in a Drama Special Awardee for Magpakailanman: Babangon Din Ang Kahapon	—N/a
2003	16th PMPC Star Awards for TV	Best Single Performance by an Actress Nominee for Magpakailanman: Kakaibang Mukha Ng Pag-ibig	—N/a
1995	FAMAS	Best Child Actress for Kahit Butas ng Karayom, Papasukin Ko	—N/a
