= Mundo Mo'y Akin =

2013 Philippine television drama series

- Title card
- Also known as: Deception
- Genre: Drama
- Created by: R.J. Nuevas
- Written by: Denoy Navarro-Punio; Des Garbes-Severino; Marlon Miguel; John Kenneth de Leon
- Directed by: Andoy Ranay
- Creative director: Jun Lana
- Starring: Sunshine Dizon; Angelika Dela Cruz; Alden Richards; Louise delos Reyes
- Theme music composer: Willy Cruz ("Pangarap na Bituin"); Sam Santos ("Haplos")
- Opening theme: "Pangarap na Bituin" by Rachelle Ann Go
- Ending theme: "Haplos" by Alden Richards
- Country of origin: Philippines
- Original language: Tagalog
- No. of episodes: 122 (list of episodes)

Production
- Executive producer: Michele Borja
- Production locations: Silang, Cavite, Philippines; Tagaytay, Cavite, Philippines; Quezon City, Philippines
- Cinematography: Pao Orendain
- Editors: Robert Reyes; Noel Mauricio
- Camera setup: Multiple-camera setup
- Running time: 20–36 minutes
- Production company: GMA Entertainment TV

Original release
- Network: GMA Network
- Release: March 18 – September 6, 2013

Mundo Mo'y Akin (transl. your world is mine / international title: Deception) is a 2013 Philippine television drama series broadcast by GMA Network. Directed by Andoy Ranay, it stars Sunshine Dizon, Angelika Dela Cruz, Alden Richards and Louise delos Reyes. It premiered on March 18, 2013 on the network's Telebabad line up. The series concluded on September 6, 2013, with a total of 122 episodes.

The series is streaming online on YouTube.

== Premise ==
Best friends Rodora and Perlita have suffered from ridicule for their physical looks. After being not seeing each other, the paths of Perlita and Rodora, now Giselle with a changed face, cross in Giselle's husband's mansion. They both get pregnant at the same time. When Giselle gives birth to an ugly baby, she switched her baby to Perlita's baby in secret.

== Cast and characters ==
Cast

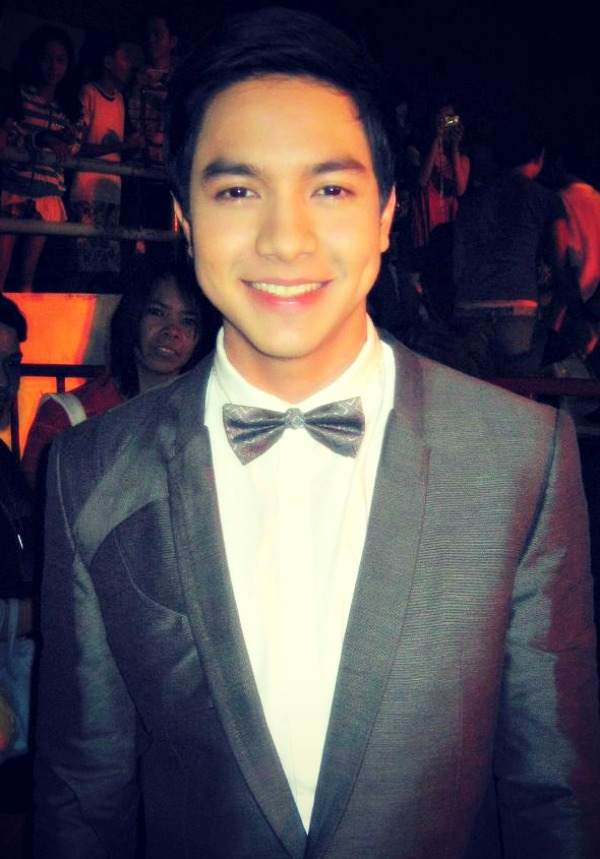
Alden Richards

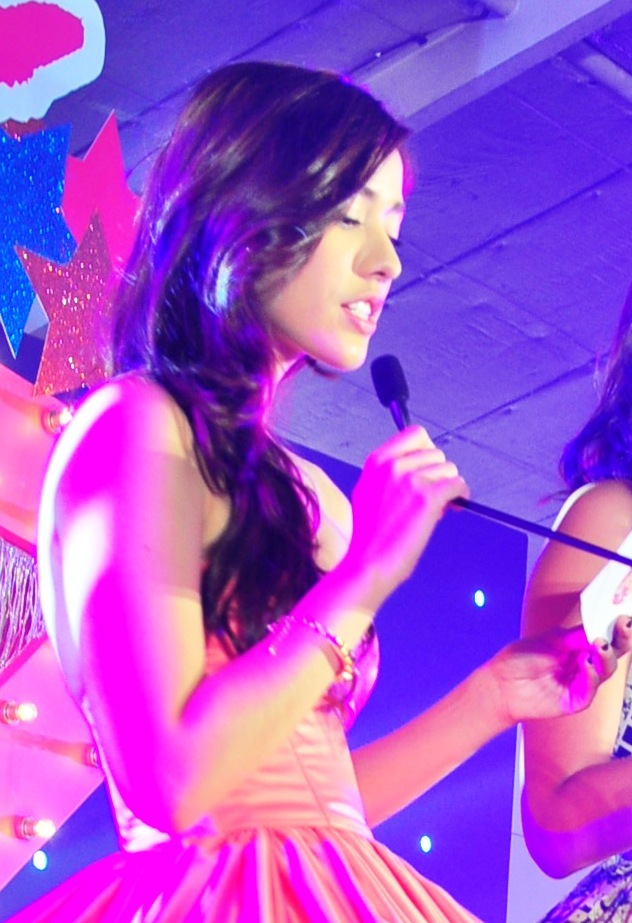
Lauren Young

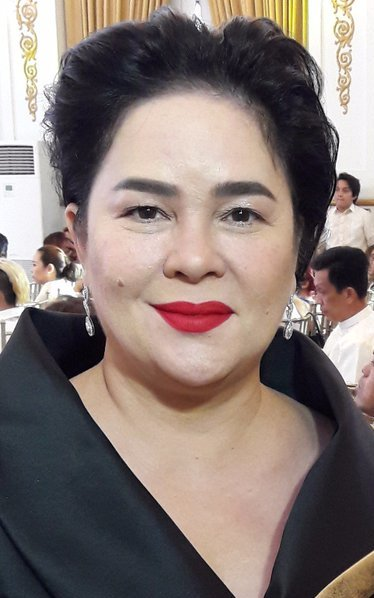
Jaclyn Jose

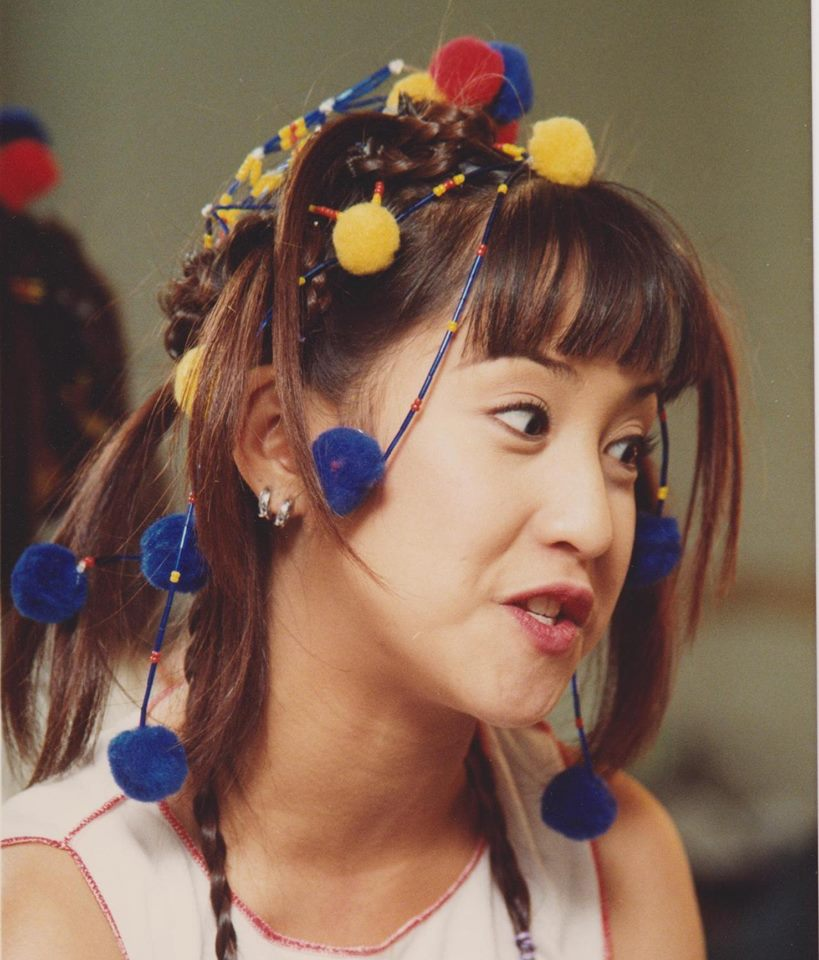
Jolina Magdangal

Lead cast

- Sunshine Dizon as Perlita Mendoza-Smith
- Angelika Dela Cruz as Giselle Atienza-Carbonel / Rodora Santos
- Alden Richards as Jerome Alvarez
- Louise delos Reyes as Marilyn Mendoza / Marilyn Atienza Carbonel

Supporting cast

- Jolina Magdangal as Zenaida "Aida" Carbonel
- Gabby Eigenmann as Ziggy Carbonel
- Lauren Young as Darlene Atienza Carbonel / Darlene Mendoza Smith
- Jaclyn Jose as Charito Carbonel

Recurring cast

- Kier Legaspi as Romeo "Romy" Alvarez
- Frances Makil-Ignacio as Josie
- Sef Cadayona as Nonoy Pambide
- Rita De Guzman as Alison Alcantara
- Marc Acueza as Harry Renacia
- Jojit Lorenzo as Andy Santos
- Fabio Ide as George Smith
- Frank Magalona as Anthony Borja

Guest cast

- Barbie Forteza as Karen

== Development ==
The series was conceptualized by R.J. Nuevas for GMA Entertainment TV and intended for an early 2013 premiere. Nuevas began developing the series mid-2012 under the title Ang Mundo Ko'y Ikaw (transl. You Are My World)

=== Casting ===
The series features eight regular cast members: Sunshine Dizon was chosen to play the protagonist, Perlita Mendoza. Dizon described the project as "A very good one that is hard to refuse. The story itself convinced me to accept the job. When they laid down the storyline, I was really moved." Angelika dela Cruz was chosen to play Rodora Santos and Giselle Carbonel. Dela Cruz said she had qualms accepting the role because "she finds it a bit weird and unrealistic for her age to play a mother to a teenage girl."

Richards and Delos Reyes portray the roles of Jerome Alvarez and Marilyn Mendoza in the series, respectively. They described their roles as "more mature and more serious than their previous acting roles." Lauren Young signed on to portray the antagonist Darlene Carbonel.

The role of Aida Carbonel was originally offered to Agot Isidro, and was turned down because Isidro found the role "quite similar" to her role in the 2012 television series, One True Love. The role eventually went to Jolina Magdangal. Gabby Eigenmann signed on to portray the role Ziggy Carbonel. He was also the first actor cast and said "I do not mind it playing another antagonist. There is so much challenge from it. People never get bored of it, including myself." Actress Jaclyn Jose signed on to play the antagonist character Charito Carbonel.

Actress Barbie Forteza made an appearance as Karen, who originated from the 2013 Philippine television drama series Anna Karenina.

== Production ==
Principal photography commenced on February 27, 2013. Originally slated to air for sixteen weeks, the series was given a three weeks extension because of its consistent high ratings and positive feedback.

== Reception ==
=== Ratings ===
According to AGB Nielsen Philippines' Mega Manila household television ratings, the pilot episode of Mundo Mo'y Akin earned a 22.7% rating. The final episode scored a 31.6% rating.

=== Critical response ===
Nestor U. Torre of Philippine Daily Inquirer said the series "generally made a positive impression on him, due to the confident and believable portrayals of its two leads, Angelika dela Cruz and Sunshine Dizon, and the penchant for "brisk" storytelling. Unlike other series that start two generations in the past, this one begins with the two leads already as young adults." Entertainment columnist, Joe Barrameda of Abante described the series as "talk of the town" because of the grand scenes and exciting flow of story. Dinno Erece of Show and Tell complimented Jolina Magdangal's performances in the series, said that "I can see her effectiveness as an anti-hero." Abante's Jojo Gabinete, complimented the performance of Jaclyn Jose, stating that "she is one of the reasons why I watching the show", and described her performance as "effortless". Gabinete also stated Gabby Eigenmann's acting performances was "powerful" in episode 67 and he was looking forward for another acting nomination and award for Eigenmann. Isah Red of Manila Standard complimented Jaclyn Jose's acting by saying that "Jose's bravura performance [in the scene] when she went into hysterics after hearing words from Perlita that Marilyn is Ziggy's daughter; and when she reacted to the DNA test results confirming that Darlene isn't her son's daughter." Red also complimented Gabby Eigenmann's performance said that "Eigenmann's reaction [in the scene] when the DNA results confirmed Marilyn is her daughter, he simply held Darlene's hand and cried quietly. The actor showed restraint only the best actors in the industry can do. Though I am no big fan of soap operas, I think with Jose and Eigenmann around, it won't be much of a waste of time to sit and watch and maybe have some tears go by for 45 minutes," he added. Red said Louise delos Reyes' acting performance in the scene where de los Reyes [...] visited Perlita (Dizon) in the hospital where she is recovering after a brain surgery, "she started showing very realistic emotions when someone sees a member of a family in that kind of state. She cried real tears even as she was blurting out her feelings for a person she knew as her mother. And that was continuous, without cuts. That's what I call good acting! And De los Reyes didn't mind that theprosthesis applied to her face to make her look "ugly" would even make her features even more horrid than already was."

== Accolades ==
Accolades received by Mundo Mo'y Akin
Year	Award	Category	Recipient	Result	Ref.
2014	Golden Screen TV Awards	Outstanding Original Drama Program	Mundo Mo'y Akin	Nominated	
2014	Golden Screen TV Awards	Outstanding Performance by an Actor in a Drama Series	Alden Richards	Nominated	
2014	Golden Screen TV Awards	Outstanding Supporting Actress in a Drama Program	Angelika dela Cruz Sunshine Dizon Jaclyn Jose	Nominated	
2014	Golden Screen TV Awards	Outstanding Supporting Actor in a Drama Program	Gabby Eigenmann	Nominated	

== Legacy ==
Actress Jaclyn Jose appeared in the 2013 Philippine television romantic drama series My Husband's Lover, portraying the same character she played in Mundo Mo'y Akin. In September 2013, actress Sunshine Dizon appeared in the 2013 Philippine television drama series Anna Karenina, portraying the same character she played in Mundo Mo'y Akin.
