= Kuh Ledesma =

Filipino musician

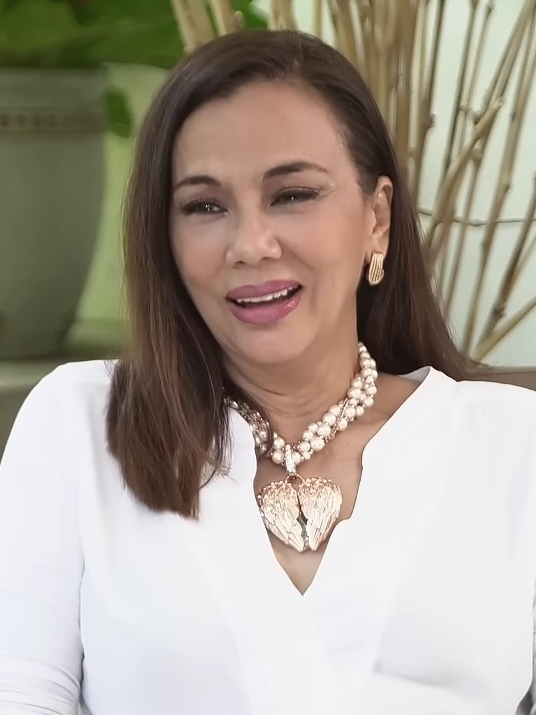
- Ledesma in 2023
- Born: Maria Socorro Hashim Ledesma; March 16, 1955 (age 71); Bacolod, Negros Occidental, Philippines
- Occupations: Singer; actress; model; fashion designer; painter
- Years active: 1980–present
- Title: OPM Pop Diva
- Children: Isabella Gonzalez

Maria Socorro "Kuh" Hashim Ledesma (born March 16, 1955) is a Filipino singer and actress, regarded for a sophisticated and distinctive vocal style of OPM. Ledesma established herself as one of the most influential and enduring figures in the Philippine music industry with a career spanning over 40 years.

== Early life ==
Ledesma was born on 16 March 1955 in Bacolod to a Filipino father (Luis Bermejo Ledesma) and a Lebanese mother (Carmen Hashim).

== Carnegie Hall ==
Filipino singer Kuh Ledesma performed at Carnegie Hall on June 3, 1988, headlining her own show, "Kuh of the Year". She is one of the first Filipino pop artists to perform at the prestigious venue.

Ledesma is famed both for her style and commanding stage presence. In 1989, Ledesma was the first Filipino artist to win the coveted Salem Music Award, affirming her international standing. In 1997, she released her U.S. debut album, Precious, featuring songs written by celebrated artists Kenny Loggins and Michael McDonald. The album achieved commercial success, making the Top 20 on the US Billboard Jazz charts. The American music database AllMusic praised Ledesma as "one of the best singers in the Philippines," underscoring her global presence. Kuh Ledesma is also an entrepreneur, founding the Music Museum, an iconic concert venue in the Philippine music scene. From its establishment, the Music Museum had hosted performances by some of the country's biggest stars including Sarah Geronimo, Lea Salonga and Regine Velasquez.

== Awards ==
Through her career, Ledesma had received numerous accolades, including the Pilita Corrales Lifetime Achievement Award at the 12th PMPC Star Awards For Music 'Singer of the Year at the 2022 Gawad Buhay Awards Lifetime Achievement Award at the 2020 Aliw Awards Dangal ng Musikang Pilipino Award at the 25th Awit Awards. The awards recognize her outstanding contributions to Original Pilipino Music and legacy as one of Asia's most successful pop icons.

== Personal life ==
Ledesma was married to Luisito "Louie" Gonzalez (a grandson of Elpidio Quirino, president of the Philippines from 1948 to 1953). Gonzalez's mother Victoria Quirino-Gonzalez, daughter of the former president, married the shipping magnate Francisco Delgado, a widower.

=== Controversy ===
Ledesma's husband, Louie Gonzalez, voluntarily surrendered to the Philippine National Bureau of Investigation on July 16, 2008, after an arrest warrant for murder and physical injuries was issued by the Manila Regional Trial Court Branch 32 Judge Thelma Medina amid the Court of Appeals review of the case. Gonzalez was arrested on March 10, 2007, for the killing of his stepbrother, Federico Delgado, who was found dead with multiple stab wounds. Kuh Ledesma, a born-again Evangelical Christian, has a daughter with Gonzalez.

== Career ==
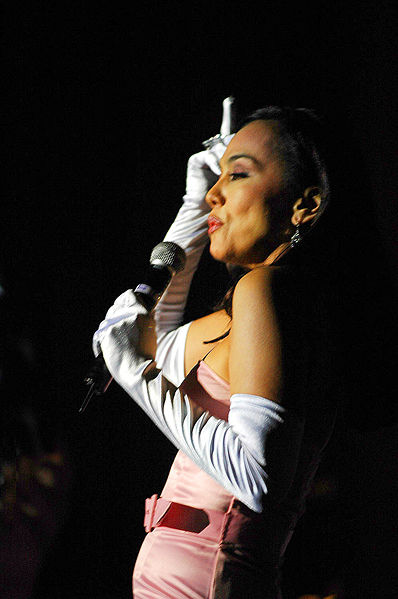
Ledesma in concert

=== Philippine and international music industry ===
Ledesma's career in music began when she joined the Lastiko band (formerly known as Ensalada band) in Bacolod while she was still a nursing student at Colegio San Agustin-Bacolod. Ledesma finished the course successfully passed the Philippine National Nursing Board Exam, and became a registered nurse. Ledesma and her bandmates Toto Gentica and Jet Montelibano later went to Manila to form the Music & Magic band which became pivotal for her career. She later received the lead role in the pop ballet Rama Hari by Alice Reyes. She eventually went solo with "Dito Ba?", Ledesma's first hit song.

==== 1980s ====
During the 1980s, Ledesma performed solo concerts at the Cultural Center of the Philippines (CCP), the Araneta Coliseum, PICC and the Philippine Folk Arts Theater.

In 1982, Ledesma launched an all-Filipino concert, 'Ako ay Pilipino' ("I am a Filipino") at the Cultural Center of the Philippines which featured a repertoire of ethnic sounds, classic kundimans and pop songs, tapping into the rich node of indigenous art and contemporary pop music to produce alternative approaches to songs. Her show eventually became a television special followed by two albums. This was immediately followed by another production at the CCP, 'Inspired Madness' in 1983, which was created in collaboration with Philippine film director Peque Gallaga and musical director Ryan Cayabyab.

During the political ambience of the 1980s, Ledesma paid tribute to Ninoy Aquino at the end of one of her shows at the Cultural Center of the Philippines by singing an a cappella rendition of "Impossible Dream" and "You'll Never Walk Alone (Hindi Ka Nagiisa)". From 1984 to 1986, Ledesma joined the APO Hiking Society in 'Ang Pinoy Nga Naman (1, 2, and 3)' at the Folk Arts Theater.

On June 3, 1988, Ledesma performed in the musical KUH of the Year at the prestigious Carnegie Hall in New York.

In March 1989, after competing with other top singers, Ledesma was selected to represent Asia at the Salem Music Awards at the Royal Albert Hall in London.

==== 1990s ====
In 1991, Ledesma accepted an invitation to be a member of the panel of judges during the Miss Universe beauty pageant in Las Vegas.

Ledesma had a series of concerts with foreign artists such as Noel Pointer, Jack Jones, Kenny Rankin, The Platters and Michel Legrand followed by other concerts with popular Philippine artists such as Regine Velasquez (U.S. tour, 1999), Pops Fernandez and Jaya ('Power of Two', 1999). After Ledesma's four-night concert with the jazz violinist Noel Pointer, she released the album, The Voice, The Violin. Ledesma was also one of the judges in the coronation night of Miss Universe 1991. In February 1994, Ledesma had the 'Two of Hearts' concert with balladeer Jack Jones. During 1995's Valentine's season, she performed with Kenny Rankin. Ledesma started the new millennium in a Valentine show with The Platters. In 2002, Ledesma had Valentine presentation with Michel Legrand.

Ledesma has her own production company Headline Concepts and built concert venues such as the Music Museum (a combined theater-restaurant built in 1988 in the Greenhills commercial complex, San Juan, Metro Manila); and the Republic of Malate in Manila, a facility located along Mabini Street in Manila, which housed a restaurant, bar, dance club and theater. However, The Republic of Malate was destroyed by a fire in November 2001.

Ledesma had a regular monthly television special called Akuhstic Café which is a musical travelogue that presented viewers the urban night life of Metro Manila by visiting clubs, lounges and concerts. Akuhstic Café was a grand finalist in the Asian Television Awards in Singapore for best musical program.

In April 1997, Ledesma became the featured artist of the 'Muling Aawit ang Pasig', a benefit concert of former Philippine First Lady Ming Ramos for the rehabilitation of the Pasig River.

In 1998, the centennial year of Philippine Independence, after producing a Valentine concert at Fort Santiago, Manila, Ledesma was commissioned by the National Centennial Commission to stage a three-night centennial concert of the year, Lahi... Kami ang Pilipino, held at the Expo Center in the former Clark Air Force Base.

==== 2000s ====
Ledesma celebrated her 25th year in the music industry by holding a series of shows at Captain's Bar of the Mandarin Oriental Manila ('Kuh Ledesma Presents').

Ledesma became a member of the Artista Para Sa Pagbabago ("Artists for Change"), an organization of artists, environmentalists and businessmen. She was also the president of the Restaurant Owners Association of Malate.

During the 2001 Philippine national elections, Ledesma was chosen by the PINATUBO (Pinag-isang Lakas Tungo sa Pagbabago) Party as a first nominee for congress. The PINATUBO Party professed a goal of alleviating poverty in the Philippines through grassroots development.

In 2002, Ledesma teamed up with composer Michel Legrand in a back-to-back concert at the Philippine International Convention Center. Years prior to that, she teamed up with international artists Noel Pointer, Jack Jones and Kenny Rankin.

In 2009, she went on a tour called A Love Affair with her daughter Isabella to New Zealand where she had a series of concerts in Auckland, Wellington, Christchurch and Hamilton.

==== 2010s ====
In December 2011, she released her first worship album, Fragrance of Worship.

Ledesma produced the Divas 4 Divas concert tour with Regine Velasquez, Zsa Zsa Padilla and Pops Fernandez.

Ledesma released her album Memories on Universal Records in 2014. She re-recorded her song, "I Think I'm in Love" for the album.

== Discography ==
=== Studio albums ===
- 1980: Kuh (LP and Cassettes)
- 1981: Kuh's Magic (LP and Cassettes)
- 1981: The Love Songs of Kuh (Cassettes)
- 1982: Just You (LP and Cassettes)
- 1983: Ako Ay Pilipino (LP, CD and Cassettes)
- 1984: I Think I’m in Love (LP and Cassettes)
- 1985: Unforgettable (LP, CD and Cassettes)
- 1986: Too Marvelous for Words (LP, CD and Cassettes)
- 1987: Feeling (LP and Cassettes)
- 1987: My First Christmas Album (LP, CD and Cassettes)
- 1989: Lihim (Cassettes)
- 1991: Ba't Mahihiyang Sabihin (LP, CD and Cassettes)
- 1992: Night and Day (Cassettes)
- 1994: The Voice and the Violin (with Noel Pointer) (CD and Cassettes)
- 1997: Precious (CD and Cassettes)
- 1999: Akuhstic (CD and Cassettes)
- 2000: Duet with Me (CD and Cassettes)
- 2003: Diva2Diva (with Zsa Zsa Padilla) (CD and Cassettes)
- 2007: K (CD)
- 2011: Fragrance of Worship (CD)
- 2014: Memories (CD)

=== Compilation albums ===
- Greatest Hits Volume 1 (Blackgold)
- Greatest Hits Volume 2 (Blackgold)
- 1989: A Long Long Time Ago (Blackgold)
- 1989: Dito Ba (Blackgold)
- 1996: The Best of Kuh (Universal)
- 2006: Till I Met You (Blackgold)
- 2006: Ako ay Pilipino 2 CD Special Collectors Edition (Blackgold)
- 2006: Silver Series (Viva)
- 2010: 18 Greatest Hits (Viva)

=== Commercial jingles ===
- Tunay Na Ligaya composed by Ogie Alcasid for NIDO
- One World of Nescafe composed by Louie Ocampo for NESCAFE
- White Lux
- Sa Health Center, Suportado Ka with Isabella for DOH
- Anejo Rhum
- Suntory Japan
- "Pilipino Ako" composed by Cecile Azarcon for Banco Filipino
- "Dalawang Dekada" for GMA 7 News and Public Affair with Freddie Aguilar, Cookie Chua, Jett Pangan and Joey Ayala
- "Panata Sa Bayan" for GMA News and Public Affairs Anthem

=== Singles ===
- "I Think I'm in Love" (1984) – re-recorded by Kuh Ledesma 30 years later in 2013; also covered by American singer Marié Digby; also covered by Martin Nievera in 2006.
- "Ako Ay Pilipino" (1982)
- "Bayan Ko" (1981) – original by Freddie Aguilar
- "Dito Ba?" (1982) – also covered by Mitoy Yonting
- "Till I Met You" (1983) – also covered by Kyla, Angeline Quinto and Regine Velasquez-Alcasid
- "Sino Ang Baliw" (1983) - also covered by Nonoy Zuñiga

== Television and film ==
=== Television ===
Ledesma self-produced several of her own TV specials including the award-winning program, Kuh by Special Arrangement. She was also a co-host on the Sunday variety show ASAP Mania.

She starred in her first TV soap, Bituin on ABS-CBN which premiered in September 2002 and appeared later on in Endless Love on GMA Network in June 2010. In 2013, she appeared on My Husband's Lover playing Elaine Soriano. She also re-recorded "One More Try" for the series (composed by Cecil Azarcon).

In March 1990, Ledesma appeared as a guest performer in a Gilbert Becaud's television show in Paris where she sang "Bulaklak" ("The Flower") in three languages (Filipino, English and French). In July 1990, she was the Philippine's representative-performer at the international television special, Earth 90 in Tokyo, Japan. Earth 90 was a show that celebrated the importance of the environment and was aired simultaneously around 80 countries.

Notable television appearances

Year	Title	Role
2002–2003	Bituin	Lyrica Luna
2003–2010	ASAP	Herself/Performer
2010	Endless Love	Carina Tantoco
2013	My Husband's Lover	Elaine Soriano
2013	Sunday All Stars	Guest judge
2013–2014	The Ryzza Mae Show	Herself/guest with daughter Isabella Gonzalez
2014	My Destiny	Selena Andrada
2015	To the Top	Guest Judge
2015–2016	Because of You	Charina Santiago
2016	Kalyeserye: The Wedding	Wedding Singer

=== Filmography ===
Ledesma has appeared in the following Philippine feature films:

- Oro, Plata, Mata
- Tinimbang ang Langit
- The Year of Living Dangerously (with Mel Gibson)
- Till I Met You (with Robin Padilla)

In 1982, Ledesma was chosen by international director Peter Weir to play the role of Tiger Lily in the film, The Year of Living Dangerously, to work with actors Mel Gibson and Sigourney Weaver.

=== Movie and television themes recorded by Kuh Ledesma ===
- Dito Ba, composed by George Canseco for Miss X
- Minsan Sa Isang Panahon, composed by Greg Ching for Karma and Tinimbang Ang Langit
- Brilyanteng Buhangin, composed by Jun Latonio and Nicanor for Kasal
- Pinulot Ka Lang Sa Lupa, composed by Gines Tan for Pinulot Ka Lang Sa Lupa
- Nagbabagang Luha, composed by Gines Tan for Nagbabagang Luha
- Babaeng Hampaslupa, composed by Gines Tan for Babaeng Hampalupa
- So It's You, composed by Cecile Azarcon for So It's You
- One More Try, (new version) composed by Cecile Azarcon for My Husband's Lover
- Father, composed by Boom Dayupay for Crying Ladies
- Fordeliza, composedy by George Canseco for Flordeliza
- Lumakad Ka, composed by George Canseco for Babae

=== Theater ===
Ledesma performed in Rama Hari and Kapinangan.

=== Endorsements ===
After becoming a model for Lux soap in the Philippines from 1984 to 1990, Ledesma also appeared in a series of print ads and television commercials for Lux in Singapore from 1988 to 1989, and in Indonesia in 1992.

== Awards and recognitions ==
=== Record certifications ===
Record
Year Awarded	Work	Certification	Ref.
1981	Dito Ba?	2× Platinum	
1981	Kuh	Gold	
1981	Kuh's Magic	Gold	
1984	Ako Ay Pilipino	2× Platinum	
1985	I Think I'm In Love	2× Platinum	
1985	Unforgettable	4× Platinum	
1990	Lihim	2× Platinum (40,000)	
2000	Akuhstic	Gold (20,000)	
