= R.J. Nuevas =

Filipino television and film writer

Robert Joseph Nuevas is a Filipino television writer and film writer. He is a resident writer of GMA Network, for which he created the graphic novel-themed series Impostora.

He has adapted, for television, three of Carlo J. Caparas' graphic novels: Bakekang in 2006, Kamandag in 2007 and Ang Babaeng Hinugot sa Aking Tadyang in 2009. He is also writing the screenplay for the big-budget movie adaptation of Caparas' most famous work, Ang Panday.

== Filmography ==
=== Television ===
- 1995: Villa Quintana (as developer)
- 1996: Anna Karenina (as writer)
- 1996: Mukha ng Buhay (as writer)
- 1997: Ikaw na Sana (as developer)
- 1998: Ganyan Kita Kamahal (as developer)
- 1998: Halik sa Apoy (as developer)
- 2000: May Bukas Pa (as head writer)
- 2003: Walang Hanggan (as writer)
- 2004: Te Amo, Maging Sino Ka Man (as creator)
- 2004: Ikaw sa Puso Ko (as writer)
- 2004: Forever in My Heart (as creator)
- 2006: Sugo (as head writer)
- 2006: Majika (as head writer)
- 2006: Bakekang (as head writer)
- 2007: Impostora (as head writer and creator)
- 2007: La Vendetta (as head writer)
- 2007: Kamandag (as head writer)
- 2008: Codename: Asero (as head writer and creator)
- 2008: Luna Mystika (as head writer)
- 2009: Ang Babaeng Hinugot sa Aking Tadyang (as head writer)
- 2009: Rosalinda (as head writer)
- 2009: Darna (as writer)
- 2010: The Last Prince (as developer)
- 2011: Captain Barbell (as developer)
- 2011: Sinner or Saint (as creator)
- 2011: Kung Aagawin Mo ang Langit (as creator)
- 2012: My Beloved (as creator)
- 2012: Luna Blanca (as creator)
- 2012: Faithfully (as creator and head writer)
- 2012: Sana ay Ikaw na Nga (as creator and head writer)
- 2012: Magdalena: Anghel sa Putikan (as creator)
- 2013: Bukod Kang Pinagpala (as creator and head writer)
- 2013: Mundo Mo'y Akin (as creator)
- 2013: Love & Lies (as creator)
- 2013: Home Sweet Home (as creator and head writer)
- 2013: Anna Karenina (as creator and head writer)
- 2013: Kahit Nasaan Ka Man (as creative director)
- 2013: Magkano Ba Ang Pag-ibig? (as creative director)
- 2013: Genesis (as creator and head writer)
- 2013: Villa Quintana (as creator and head writer)
- 2014: Innamorata (as creator and head writer)
- 2015: Second Chances (as creator)
- 2015: Buena Familia (as creator)
- 2016: Once Again (as head writer)
- 2016: Hahamakin ang Lahat (as creator and head writer)
- 2016: Ika-6 na Utos (as creator and head writer)
- 2017: Impostora (as creator and head writer)
- 2018: Sherlock Jr. (as head writer)
- 2018: Ika-5 Utos (as head writer)
- 2021: Babawiin Ko ang Lahat (as creator)
- 2021: Heartful Café (as creator and head writer)
- 2022: Maria Clara at Ibarra (as creator)
- 2023: The Seed of Love (as creator)
- 2023: Royal Blood (as creator)
- 2024: Widows' War (as creator)
- 2025: Slay (as creator)
- 2025: Encantadia Chronicles: Sang'gre (as creative director)
- 2026: Apoy sa Dugo (as writer)

=== Film ===
- 1992: Ngayon at Kailan Man (screenplay)
- 1997: Wala na Bang Iba (story and screenplay)
- 2000: Birthday Gift 2 (screenplay)
- 2003: Captain Barbell (story and screenplay)
- 2004: Annie B. (screenplay)
- 2004: Lastikman: Unang Banat (story)
- 2005: Let the Love Begin (screenplay)
- 2005: Say That You Love Me (screenplay)
- 2006: I Will Always Love You (story and screenplay)
- 2007: Bahay Kubo (screenplay)
- 2008: Dobol Trobol (screenplay)
- 2009: Ang Panday (screenplay)
- 2010: Si Agimat at si Enteng Kabisote (story and screenplay)
