= List of horror films of 1996 =

A list of horror films released in 1996.

Horror films released in 1996
Title	Director	Cast	Country	Notes
Aatank (translation: Terror)	Prem Lalwani	Dharmendra, Vinod Mehra, Hema Malini, Amjad Khan	India	
Amityville Dollhouse	Steve White	Robin Thomas, Starr Andreeff, Allen Cutler	United States	Direct-to-video
Are You Afraid of the Dark?	Don Escudero	Angelu De Leon, Rica Peralejo, Bobby Andrews, Michael Flores, Red Sternberg, Raven Villanueva, Lee Robin Salazar, Onemig Bondoc	Philippines	
Bad Moon	Eric Red	Mariel Hemingway, Michael Paré, Mason Gamble	United States	
Bangis	Philip Ko, Rogelio Salvador	Jasmin Reyes	Philippines	
Carnosaur 3: Primal Species	Jonathan A. Winfrey	Scott Valentine, Janet Gunn, Rick Dean	United States	
Children of the Corn IV: The Gathering	Greg Spence	Naomi Watts, Karen Black, William Windom	United States	Direct-to-video
The Craft	Andrew Fleming	Fairuza Balk, Neve Campbell, Rachel True	United States	
Dead of Night (a.k.a. Dark Hunger)	Kristoffer Tabori	Diana Frank, Paul Winfield, Tanya Newbould, Robert Knepper, Alex Rocco	United States	
The Dentist	Brian Yuzna	Corbin Bernsen, Linda Hoffman, Molly Hagan	United States	
Don't Look Up	Hideo Nakata	Yurei Yanagi, Yasuyo Shirashima, Kei Ishibashi	Japan	
Ebola Syndrome	Herman Yau	Anthony Wong Chau-Sang, Fui-On Shing, Yeung-ming Wan	Hong Kong	
Eko eko azaraku II	Shimako Sato	Kimika Yoshino, Akira Otano, Miho Fukuya	Japan	
The Frighteners	Peter Jackson	Michael J. Fox, Trini Alvarado, Peter Dobson, Dee Wallace Stone, John Astin, Jeffrey Combs	New Zealand; United States	
Frostbiter: Wrath of the Wendigo	Tom Chaney	Ron Asheton, Lori Baker, Devlin Burton	United States	Horror comedy
From Dusk Till Dawn	Robert Rodriguez	George Clooney, Harvey Keitel, Quentin Tarantino	United States	
Goblet of Gore	Andreas Schnaas	Bela B., Vivian Giaretti, Per Gilomen	Germany	
Head of the Family	Charles Band	Blake Bailey, Bob Schott, J.W. Perra	United States	
Hellraiser: Bloodline	Alan Smithee, Kevin Yagher	Bruce Ramsay, Valentina Vargas, Doug Bradley	United States	
Impakto	Don Escudero	Gelli De Belen, Antonio Aquitania	Philippines	
Leprechaun 4: In Space	Brian Trenchard-Smith	Warwick Davis, Rebekah Carlton, Brent Jasmer, Jessica Collins, Guy Siner	United States	
Licántropo	Francisco Rodríguez Gordillo	Paul Naschy, Amparo Muñoz, Antonio Pica	Spain	
Life Among the Cannibals	Harry Bromley Davenport	Juliet Landau, Wings Hauser, Bette Ford	United States	
Night Hunter	Rick Jacobson	Don Wilson, Maria Ford	United States	
Pinocchio's Revenge	Kevin S. Tenney	Candace McKenzie, Lewis Van Bergen, Ivan Gueron	United States	
Polymorph	J. R. Bookwalter	James L. Edwards, Jennifer Huss, Michael Ruso, Ariauna Albright	United States	
Scream	Wes Craven	Neve Campbell, Courteney Cox, David Arquette, Skeet Ulrich, Drew Barrymore, Matthew Lillard, Rose McGowan, Jamie Kennedy	United States	
Tales from the Crypt Presents Bordello of Blood	Gilbert Adler	Dennis Miller, Erika Eleniak, Angie Everhart	United States	
Thinner	Tom Holland	Robert John Burke, Joe Mantegna, Lucinda Jenney	United States	Based on the 1984 Stephen King novel
Tremors II: Aftershocks	S. S. Wilson	Fred Ward	United States	Direct-to-video
Trilogy of Terror II	Dan Curtis	Lysette Anthony, Geraint Wyn Davies, Matt Clark	United States	Television film
The Uninvited	Larry Shaw	Sharon Lawrence, Shirley Knight, Beau Bridges, Emily Bridges	United States	Television Movie; Based on a true story
Vampirella	Jim Wynorski	Talisa Soto, Roger Daltrey, Tom Deters, Angus Scrimm	United States	Presented by Roger Corman; Based on the 1969 comic book series
Witchcraft VIII: Salem's Ghost	Joseph John Barmettler	Kim Kopf, Jack Valan, David Jean Thomas	United States	
