= Laging Naroon Ka =

- Official movie poster
- Directed by: Don Escudero
- Written by: Jose Javier Reyes
- Produced by: Vic Del Rosario Jr.
- Starring: Angelu de Leon; Bobby Andrews; Kim delos Santos; Red Sternberg
- Production company: Viva Films
- Distributed by: Viva Films
- Release date: April 9, 1997
- Running time: 115 minutes
- Country: Philippines
- Language: Filipino

Laging Naroon Ka is a 1997 Philippine teen romance-comedy film directed by Don Escudero and written by Jose Javier Reyes. The film stars Angelu de Leon and Bobby Andrews. The story follows an "opposite attracts trope".

== Synopsis ==
After breaking up with her boyfriend, an outgoing and candid Trixie agrees to be in a group date with a shy and introverted Quinito, her schoolmate. Initially, the two dislike each other but fate keeps bringing them back together until they start to develop a romantic feelings for one another.

== Cast ==
Main cast

- Angelu de Leon as Patricia "Trixie" Gomez
- Bobby Andrews as Quinito

Supporting cast

- Kim delos Santos as Pia
- Red Sternberg as Jake
- Megan Aguilar as Patsy
- Jake Roxas as Christian
- Gloria Romero as Lola Lucing
- Mitch Valdez as Tipsy
- Noel Trinidad as Ossie
- Eddie Arenas as Lolo Paquing
- Mandy Ochoa as Wally
- Carlo Headsman as Cedric

== External link ==
- Laging Naroon Ka at IMDb
- Laging Naroon Ka at Rotten Tomatoes
