= T.G.I.S. The Movie =

T.G.I.S The Movie
- Official movie poster
- Directed by: Mark A. Reyes
- Written by: Kit Villanueva-Zapata
- Produced by: William C. Leary
- Starring: Angelu de Leon; Bobby Andrews; Rica Peralejo; Onemig Bondoc; Raven Villanueva; Michael Flores; Ciara Sotto; Red Sternberg
- Production companies: Viva Films; GMA Films
- Distributed by: Viva Films
- Release date: January 4, 1997
- Running time: 115 minutes
- Country: Philippines
- Language: Filipino

T.G.I.S. The Movie is a 1997 Philippine teen adventure film directed by Mark A. Reyes and written by Kit Villanueva-Zapata. The film stars Angelu de Leon, Bobby Andrews, Rica Peralejo, Onemig Bondoc, Raven Villanueva , Michael Flores, Ciara Sotto and Red Sternberg. The movie is the film adaptation of the youth orientation series Thank God It's Sabado (T.G.I.S).

== Synopsis ==
Joaquin "Wacks" plans a weekend get-away with Peachy and the rest of his group of friends using his father's yacht without telling him. The boat broke down, leaving him and his friends stranded on an island.

== Cast ==
Main cast

- Angelu de Leon as Maria Patrice "Peachy" Real
- Bobby Andrews as Joaquin "Wacks"
- Rica Peralejo as Michelle "Mitch" Ferrer
- Onemig Bondoc as Jose Mari "JM" Rodriguez
- Raven Villanueva as Christina "Cris" De Guzman
- Michael Flores as Miguel "Mickey" Ledesma
- Ciara Sotto as Regina "Rain" Abrera
- Red Sternberg as Kiko

Supporting cast

- Lito Legaspi as Rocky Torres
- Mia Gutierrez as Nieves Torres
- Kim delos Santos as Tere
- Belinda Panelo as Ivy
- Maybelyn dela Cruz as Maruja
- Idelle Martinez as Samantha
- Chico Ventosa as Gabby
- Lester Llansang as Casper
- Shintaro Valdez as Jay
- Evangeline Pascual as Anne Rodriguez
- Orestes Ojeda as Greg Rodriguez
- Pocholo Montes as James Real
- Sherry Lara as Apples Real
- Lucita Soriano as Saling
- Eva Darren as Linda
- Melissa Mendez as Andrea Abrera
- Fame delos Santos as Doris De Guzman
- Chinggoy Alonzo as Randy Ferrer
- Mon Confiado as rescuer
