= Raven Villanueva =

Filipino actress

- Occupation: Actress

Raven Villanueva is a Filipino actress in movies and television shows in the Philippines.

== Career ==
Villanueva started as a commercial model, then joined defunct GMA youth-oriented program That's Entertainment in 1994, where her batchmate was another actress Rufa Mae Quinto. From there, Villanueva played as Cris in T.G.I.S. (Thank God It's Sabado), youth-oriented drama series produced by Viva Television aired on GMA Network from 1995 to 1997, together with Angelu de Leon, Bobby Andrews, Onemig Bondoc, Ciara Sotto, her That's co-star Kim delos Santos, among others, and continued sequel Growing Up from 1997 to 1999.

She was later on repackaged as a sexy actress. She did her first sexy movie with Rica Peralejo (her former T.G.I.S. co-star) and Mark Anthony Fernandez in Erik Matti's Dos Ekis (2001) under Viva Films. Her last movie appearance was in the 2002 action-drama film Hari ng Selda: Anak ni Baby Ama 2 co-starring her with Robin Padilla and Angelika Dela Cruz. She also continued her television career via Ikaw Lang ang Mamahalin under GMA Network in 2002, wherein she reunited with her co-star Angelika Dela Cruz, the leading actress of the TV series.

== Personal life ==
She was previously married to actor and news anchor Diego Castro III on August 11, 1998 in the U.S., wherein she has a daughter, Angelica Claire. She worked in Guam for three years as a manager in a jewelry store. Villanueva and Castro are now divorced.

She is currently married to an American minister. She just recently gave birth to a baby boy and now living in Ohio, USA. Her daughter, Angelica Claire, became a contract star of Sparkle GMA Artist Center and is now known as Claire Castro.

== Filmography ==
=== Film ===
- April Boys: Sana'y Mahalin Mo Rin Ako (1996)
- Wanted: Perfect Mother (1996)
- Are You Afraid of the Dark? (1996)
- Where 'D Girls 'R (1996)
- T.G.I.S.: The Movie (1997)
- Honey, Nasa Langit Na Ba Ako? (1998)
- Dos Ekis (2001)
- Hari Ng Selda: Anak ni Baby Ama 2 (2002)
- Mama San (2002)
- Lastikman (2003)
- Troika (2007)

=== Television ===
- T.G.I.S. (1995–1997)
- Growing Up (1997–1999)
- Ikaw Lang ang Mamahalin (2001)
- Narito ang Puso Ko (2003–2004)
- At Your Service (2005)
