= Angelu de Leon =

Filipino actress

The Honorable Angelu de Leon
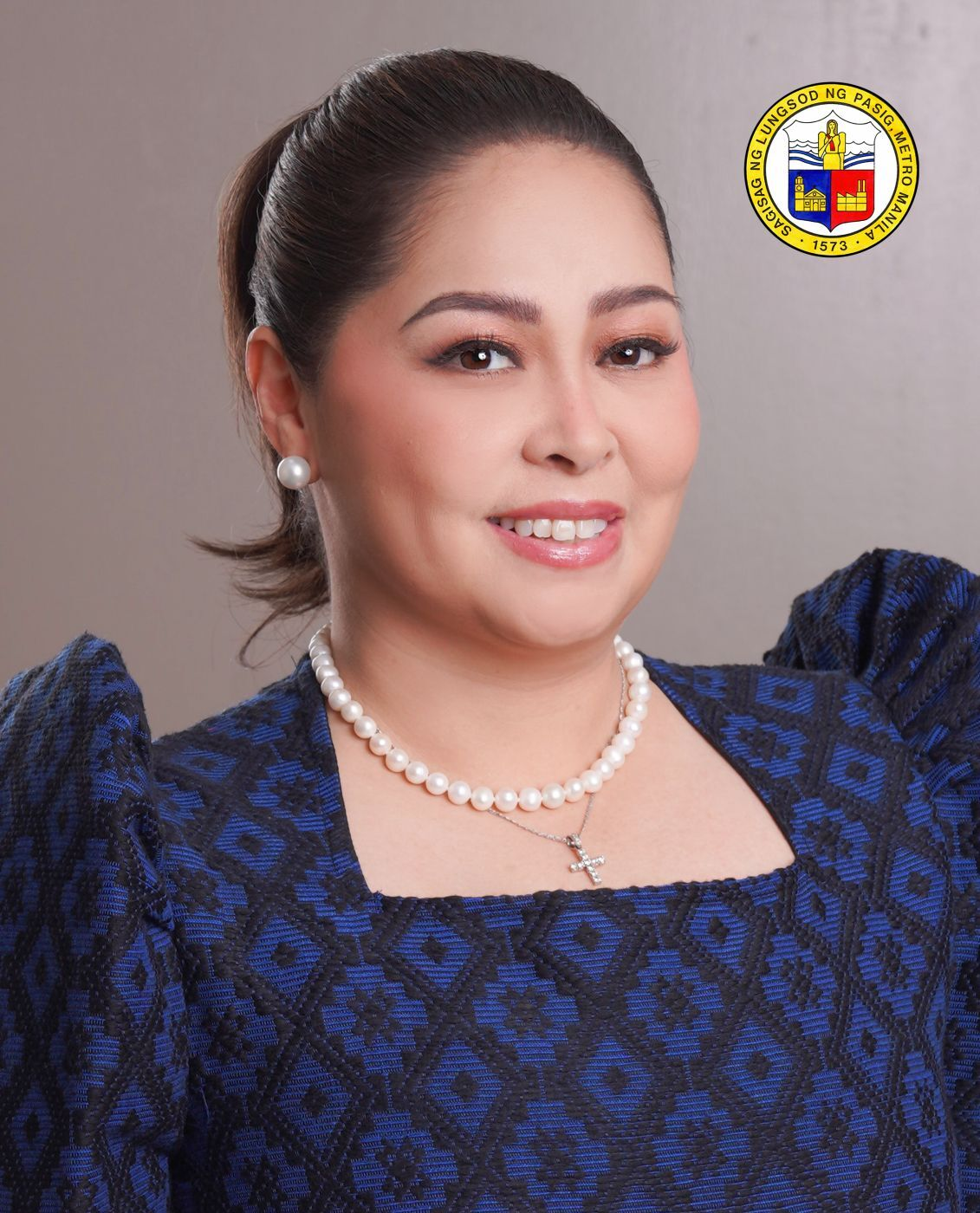
- Official portrait, 2025

Member of the Pasig City Council from the 2nd district
- Incumbent
- Assumed office June 30, 2022

Personal details
- Born: Maria Luisa Angela Martinez de Leon; August 22, 1979 (age 46) Manila, Philippines
- Party: Independent (2024–present); Giting ng Pasig (local party; 2021–present)
- Other political affiliations: Aksyon (2021–2024)
- Spouse: Wowie Rivera (m. 2010)
- Children: 3
- Occupation: Actress; politician

Maria Luisa Angela "Angelu" Martinez de Leon-Rivera (born August 22, 1979) is a Filipino actress and politician.

== Early and personal life ==
Angelu de Leon is the youngest daughter of Luis and Flora de Leon. She attended St. Joseph's College, Holy Spirit and Siena College. She made her first commercial, without her father's knowledge, when she was just ten years old. Her father eventually gave his blessing to her acting career before his death from colon cancer.

In 2007, De Leon became a born again Christian and became an active member of a church in Ortigas.

In 2016, De Leon disclosed that she had been diagnosed with Bell's palsy in 2009.

De Leon is married to Lorenzo "Wowie" Rivera. They married on September 17, 2010.

De Leon has three children: Nicole, her daughter with actor Joko Diaz; Loise, her daughter with businessman Jojo Manlongat; and Rafa, her son with husband Wowie Rivera.

== Acting career ==
De Leon started acting on television at the age of 12. She was discovered by Johnny Manahan for a kiddie gag show Ang TV (1992–1993), aired on ABS-CBN. Among her batchmates were Claudine Barretto, Jolina Magdangal and Rica Peralejo. After about a year on the said youth-oriented comedy variety-show, she transferred to GMA Network, where she became part of Ober Da Bakod (1992–1997) with Janno Gibbs and Anjo Yllana. In the same year, she became a talent of Viva Films, with Di Na Natuto (1993) as her theatrical debut. During her early years, she mostly played younger sister to more established stars. In 1994, she bagged her first major role in Kadenang Bulaklak (1993), where she starred alongside Ana Roces, Vina Morales, and Donna Cruz.

In 1995, de Leon got her break when she was included in teen oriented shows like T.G.I.S. or Thank God It's Sabado (1995–1997) and Growing Up (1997–1999) with Onemig Bondoc, Ciara Sotto, Raven Villanueva, Michael Flores, Rica Peralejo and Red Sternberg. She became the highest-paid actress on T.G.I.S. These shows gave her a chance to team up with Bobby Andrews, and their partnership became one of the hottest onscreen love teams of her generation in the mid-1990s. Among the noted Angelu-Bobby team-up movies were: Takot Ka Ba Sa Dilim (1996), T.G.I.S.: The Movie (1997), Laging Naroon Ka (1997) and Wala Na Bang Pag-ibig (1997), as well as their first drama series Ikaw Na Sana, which was also turned into a movie.

In 1998, at the peak of her career, de Leon became pregnant by fellow Viva talent Joko Diaz. This caused her to go on maternity leave, with projects lined up for her either shelved or passed on to other young stars. A year later, she made a comeback on film, this time bagging mature roles in Bulaklak ng Maynila (1999) and Abandonada (2000). Her career was put on hold again when she got pregnant again in 2001 by businessman Jojo Manlongat. Among the films she starred outside Viva were 'Elmer Jamias (2000) and Aishite Imasu 1941: Mahal Kita (2004).

In late 2001, de Leon started bagging mother roles, beginning with Sana ay Ikaw na Nga. In 2006, she went back to GMA's rival station ABS-CBN, where she played supporting roles, including Super Inggo (2006-2007), its sequel Super Inggo 1.5: Ang Bagong Bangis (2007) and Parekoy (2009).

She returned to GMA with Ang Babaeng Hinugot sa Aking Tadyang (2009), starring Marian Rivera and Dingdong Dantes. It was for her work in the said soap that she was given rave reviews, complemented with the fact that she was back to her sexy figure and can give other young actresses a run for their money. de Leon is a talent of Viva Artists Agency since 2021.

== Political career ==
De Leon entered into politics when she filed her candidacy for councilor in Pasig's 2nd district for the May 2022 polls under Aksyon Demokratiko. She was included in the Giting ng Pasig coalition of Mayor Vico Sotto. She garnered 138,427 votes, making her as the topnotcher councilor for Pasig's 2nd district.

== Electoral history ==
Electoral history of Angelu de Leon
Year	Office	Party		Votes received				Result
Year	Office	Local	National	Total	%	P.	Swing	Result
2022	Councilor of Pasig's 2nd District	Giting ng Pasig	Aksyon	138,427	12.37%	1st	—N/a	Won
2025	Councilor of Pasig's 2nd District	Giting ng Pasig	IND	174,041	14.82%	1st	+2.45	Won

== Filmography ==
=== Television ===
Year	Title	Role
1992–1993	Ang TV	Various roles
1993	Home Along Da Riles	Episode Guest
1994	Ober Da Bakod	Kuting
1995–1997	T.G.I.S.	Ma. Patrice "Peachy" Real-Torres née da Silva
1997–1999	Growing Up	Ma. Patrice "Peachy" Real-Torres née da Silva
1997–1998	Ikaw na Sana	Blanca Rosales Perez / Susan Saavedra
2000–2001	May Bukas Pa	Irene Buencamino
2001–2003	Sana ay Ikaw na Nga	Agnes Consuelo Villavicer
2003–2004	Buttercup	Cloe
2004	Te Amo, Maging Sino Ka Man	Colette Camacho
2006–2007	Super Inggo	Pacita Jacinto
2007	Super Inggo 1.5: Ang Bagong Bangis	Pacita Jacinto
2009	Parekoy	Angelique
2009	Ang Babaeng Hinugot sa Aking Tadyang	Heleen Barrientos
2010	The Last Prince	Mayang
2010	Love Bug Presents: Exchange of Hearts	Fina
2010–2011	Koreana	Nerissa Rosales-Jung
2011	Sisid	Alicia Cordelia
2012	Hindi Ka na Mag-iisa	Jordana Montenegro
2012–2013	Teen Gen	Ma. Patrice "Peachy" Real-Torres née da Silva
2013	Pyra: Babaeng Apoy	Merly Lucente
2014	Niño	Leny Inocente
2015–2016	Buena Familia	Bettina Agravante-Buena / Sally Rosales
2016	Encantadia	Amanda Reyes-Quizon
2017	Mulawin vs. Ravena	Lourdes
2017	Road Trip	Herself / Guest
2018	Sirkus	Liza
2018	The Stepdaughters	Brenda Salvador
2018	Inday Will Always Love You	Rica
2019	Inagaw na Bituin	Aurora Mendoza-Dela Cruz
2021	Di Na Muli	Grace
2024	Pulang Araw	Carmela Borromeo
2026	Never Say Die	Clarissa Delgado
2026	Paskong Pinoy: The Last New Year in Boracay	

=== Talk show ===
Celebrity DAT Com is a showbiz talk show aired on IBC from May 22, 2003, to September 3, 2004. Launched in 2003, after IBC was reformatted, with its new slogan New Face. New Attitude, one of the programs launched was Celebrity DAT Com. DAT stands for Dolly (Dolly Ann Carvajal), Angelu, and TJ (TJ Manotoc). The program was one of the reincarnation of IBC's past showbiz talk shows in evening slot like Seeing Stars with Joe Quirino and See True. It was aired every Thursdays at 9:30pm. This show gave the viewers with some interviews with the celebrities, movie and CD reviews, human interest stories, sports updates, and blind items.

=== Film ===
Year	Title	Role
1993	Di Na Natuto	Elisa
1993	Kadenang Bulaklak	Daisy Abolencia / Tricia Hidalgo
1994	Ober da Bakod: The Movie	Kuting
1994	Forever	Cindy Valdez
1995	P're Hanggang Sa Huli	Jing-jing
1995	Okey si Ma'am	Ida
1995	Jessica Alfaro Story	Lorraine
1996	Takot Ka Ba sa dilim?	Carly
1996	Where 'D' Girls 'R'	Demetria
1997	T.G.I.S. The Movie	Ma. Patrice "Peachy/Pancakes" Real
1997	Isinakdal Ko Ang Aking Ina	Karen Ilagan
1997	Wala Na Bang Pag-ibig?	Gemma Caringal
1997	Laging Naroon Ka	Patricia Gomez/Tricia/Trixie
1998	Ikaw na Sana: The Movie	Blanca
1998	Ang Lahat ng Ito'y Para Sa 'yo	Catherine Mendoza/Cathy
1999	Bulaklak ng Maynila	Ada
2000	Col. Elmer Jamias: Barako ng Maynila	Goody Ramirez Jamias
2000	Bukas na Lang Kita Mamahalin	Abigail Mansueto/Abby
2000	Abandonada	Cindy
2002	D' Uragons	Claudia
2003	www.XXX.com	Doray/Habibi
2004	Aishite Imasu 1941: Mahal Kita	Maura
2008	Paupahan	Angela San Pedro
2009	Status: Single	Wanda
2009	Hellphone	Cate
2011	Tween Academy: Class of 2012	Luisa
2013	Girl, Boy, Bakla, Tomboy	Rhea
2014	Echoserang Frog	Madam Berta
2020	Pakboys Takusa	Selina
2024	Sunny	Chona

== Awards and nominations ==
=== Acting awards ===
Year	Award	Category	Work	Result
1999	Metro Manila Film Festival	Best Supporting Actress	Bulaklak ng Maynila	Won

=== Other awards ===
Year	Award	Category
1993	Guillermo Mendoza Scholarship Foundation	Darling of The Press for Kadenang Bulaklak
1998	Guillermo Mendoza Scholarship Foundation	Teenage Queen for T.G.I.S. and Growing Up
1998	Guillermo Mendoza Scholarship Foundation	Most Popular Love Team for T.G.I.S. and Growing Up
2009	YES! Magazine	100 Most Beautiful Stars Year 2009

=== Nominations ===
Year	Award	Category
1999	FAMAS	Best Supporting Actress for Bulaklak ng Maynila
1999	Star Awards	Best Supporting Actress for Bulaklak ng Maynila
2000	FAP Awards	Best Actress for Bukas Na Lang Kita Mamahalin
2000	Parangal ng Bayan Awards	Best Young Actress for Bukas Na Lang Kita Mamahalin
2000	FAP Awards	Best Supporting Actress for Abandonada
2000	Star Awards	Best Supporting Actress for Abandonada
2004	FAMAS	Best Supporting Actress for Aishite Imasu 1941: Mahal Kita
2011	Empress Golden Screen Awards	Outstanding Supporting Actress for Sisid
2011	Empress Golden Screen Awards	Outstanding Performance by an Actress in a Single Drama Untold Stories : Anak ng Aliw
