= Teen Gen =

Philippine television drama series

- Title card
- Genre: Drama
- Developed by: Kit Villanueva-Langit; Mark A. Reyes V
- Written by: Kit Villanueva-Langit
- Directed by: Mark A. Reyes; Albert Langitan
- Creative director: Jun Lana
- Starring: Angelu de Leon; Bobby Andrews; Dianne Hernandez; Juancho Trivino; Jeric Gonzales; Thea Tolentino; Seth Isay; Abel Estanislao; Sunyee Maluche; Gianna Revilla; Mikoy Morales
- Theme music composer: Mikoy Morales
- Opening theme: "Everything is Alright" by Julie Anne San Jose
- Country of origin: Philippines
- Original language: Tagalog
- No. of episodes: 28

Production
- Executive producer: Jan Navarro
- Production locations: Quezon City, Philippines
- Cinematography: Jay Linao
- Camera setup: Multiple-camera setup
- Running time: 60 minutes
- Production company: GMA Entertainment TV

Original release
- Network: GMA Network
- Release: December 16, 2012 – June 30, 2013

Related
- T.G.I.S.; Growing Up

Teen Gen is a Philippine television drama series broadcast by GMA Network. The series is a spin-off of the 1990s television series T.G.I.S. Directed by Mark A. Reyes V and Albert Langitan, it stars Angelu de Leon and Bobby Andrews. It premiered on December 16, 2012, on the network's Sunday afternoon line up. The series concluded on June 30, 2013, with a total of 28 episodes.

The series is streaming online on YouTube.

== Cast and characters ==
Cast

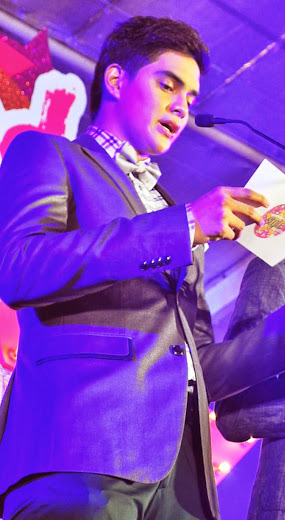
Juancho Triviño

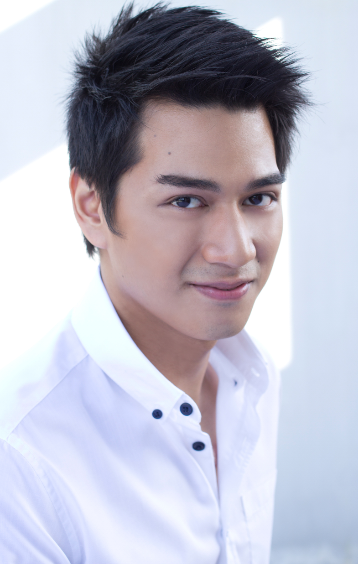
Abel Estanislao

=== Main cast ===
- Angelu de Leon as Ma. Patrice "Peachy" Real-Torres nee da Silva – A main character from T.G.I.S. and Growing Up, Peachy was originally slated to marry Wacks during the initial season of Growing Up, and eventually bailed. By the time of the events of Teen Gen, Peachy is a widowed single mother.
- Bobby Andrews as Joaquin "Wacks" Torres III
- Dianne Hernandez as Ma. Lyca da Silva
- Juancho Triviño as Luis Joaquin "Lucho"
- Jeric Gonzales as Santiago "Tiago" Torres – Wacks' nephew and Lucho's cousin, Tiago is TG's resident musician. He is depicted as the son of a shipping magnate, but does not let his rich-kid status go to his head. Wacks often calls on him to rein in Lucho's bad behavior.
- Thea Tolentino as Angela "Angge" Parahinog
- Gianna Revilla as Madison Avenida – One of the more popular girls in school, Madison is every bit a trendsetter and claims to have followers on Twitter and Instagram. She is one of the campus A-listers, but gradually hangs out with the other female characters.
- Abel Estanislao as Jose Vicente "JV" Cortez - One of the four TG boys, JV is a young man from the province. He often has a penchant for romantic gestures.
- Sunyee Maluche as Andrea "Drew" Remulla
- Seth Isay as Carlitos "Itos" Buenavidez Jr. – Lucho's best friend and one of the four TG boys, Itos is the athletic type and tries to have his way with women. Isay left the show in late 2012, citing personal reasons. His character was written off as having signed up for a soccer league in the US.
- Mikoy Morales as Xavier "Xavi" de Leon

=== Guest cast ===
- Gab de Leon as Jeffrey "Jeff" Buenavidez
- Isabel Granada as Mrs. Parahinog
- Robert Ortega as Mr. Parahinog
- Rica Peralejo as Czarina
- Arkin Magalona as Mackenzie Parahinog
- Michael Flores as Miguel "Migs" Ledesma
- Bernadette Allyson as Beatrice "Bea" Santillan
- Ara Mina as Violet Bernardo
- Bubbles Paraiso as Sophie Torres
- Alden Richards as Inigo Bermudez
- Neri Naig as Selena Ramirez

== Development ==
Kit Villanueva-Langit, began developing the series mid-2012, under the title TGIS New Generation. The title eventually changed to Teen Gen as the series' creator and director, Mark Reyes and the production team wanted the series to have a fresh start stating they "didn't want to look back, instead move forward."

Auditions for the cast took place at GMA Network Center in Quezon City in September 2012. Mark Reyes, Kit Villanueva-Langit and series' executive producer Jan Navarro served as the casting panel. The cast was finalized in October 2012. T.G.I.S. alumni and loveteam Angelu de Leon and Bobby Andrews were the first two actors to be cast reprising their original characters Peachy and Wacks, respectively. Protégé: The Battle For The Big Artista Break winners, Jeric Gonzales and Thea Tolentino, commercial models Dianne Hernandez and Juancho Trivino were chosen for the roles of Lyca and Lucho, respectively. Gianna Revilla, Gab de Leon and Arkin Magalona - all children of Philippine celebrities - auditioned and landed roles.

== Production ==
Principal photography commenced on November 25, 2012. Most of the series' scenes were shot on location in a private subdivision in Quezon City.

Albert Langitan formally took over directorial duties at the start of the second season. The same season, Seth Isay confirmed his departure from the show, citing personal reasons for his decision.

In May 2013, the network renewed the series for a shorter third season, comprising only two episodes. However, GMA management shortly announced that Teen Gen would be cancelled. Officials explained that the series, along with Party Pilipinas on May 18, 2013, were axed to make way for a new show.

== Ratings ==
According to AGB Nielsen Philippines' Mega Manila household television ratings, the pilot episode of Teen Gen earned a 9.1% rating. The final episode scored an 8.6% rating.

== Accolades ==
Accolades received by Teen Gen
| Year | Award | Category | Recipient | Result | Ref. |
|---|---|---|---|---|---|
| 2013 | 27th PMPC Star Awards for Television | Best Youth-Oriented Program | Teen Gen | Nominated | |
| 2013 | 27th PMPC Star Awards for Television | Best New Female TV Personality | Thea Tolentino Gianna Revilla | Nominated | |
| 2013 | 27th PMPC Star Awards for Television | Best New Male TV Personality | Mikoy Morales | Nominated | |
| 2014 | Golden Screen TV Awards | Outstanding Breakthrough Performance by an Actor | Jeric Gonzales Mikoy Morales Ruru Madrid | Nominated | |
| 2014 | Golden Screen TV Awards | Outstanding Breakthrough Performance by an Actress | Thea Tolentino | Nominated | |
