= Ikaw na Sana =

Philippine television drama series

- Title card
- Also known as: Destiny
- Genre: Romantic drama
- Developed by: R.J. Nuevas
- Directed by: Mac Alejandre
- Starring: Angelu de Leon; Bobby Andrews
- Theme music composer: Vehnee Saturno
- Opening theme: "Ikaw na Sana" by Butch Montejo and Kristine Mercaida
- Country of origin: Philippines
- Original language: Tagalog
- No. of episodes: 272

Production
- Executive producer: Veronique del Rosario-Corpus
- Camera setup: Multiple-camera setup
- Running time: 30–45 minutes
- Production company: Viva Television

Original release
- Network: GMA Network
- Release: March 17, 1997 – April 3, 1998

Ikaw na Sana (transl. hope it is you / international title: Destiny) is a Philippine television drama romance series broadcast by GMA Network. Directed by Mac Alejandre, it stars Angelu de Leon and Bobby Andrews. It premiered on March 17, 1997. The series concluded on April 3, 1998, with a total of 272 episodes.

The series was later adapted into a film of the same title.

== Cast and characters ==
Cast

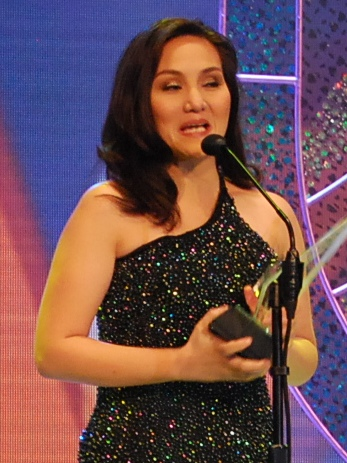
Gladys Reyes

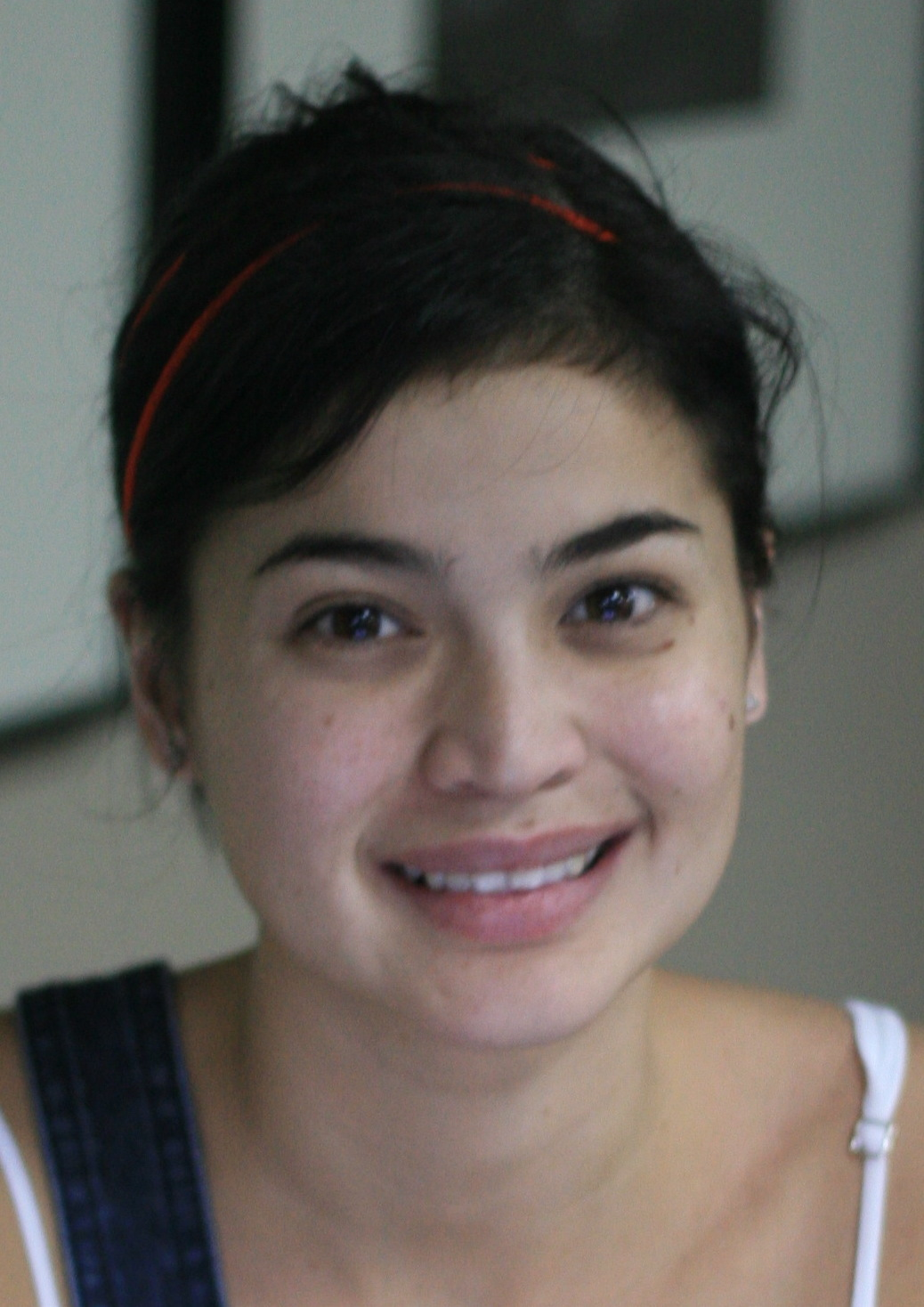
Anne Curtis

Lead cast

- Angelu de Leon as Blanca Rosales Perez / Susan Saavedra
- Bobby Andrews as Rafael Huico

Supporting cast

- Gladys Reyes as Angela Rosales
- Carmi Martin as Barbara Rosales Juico
- Cherry Pie Picache as Corazon Rosales-Perez
- Jake Roxas as Emil
- Isabel Granada as Lucila Rosales
- Jeffrey Santos as Eric de Saavedra
- Alicia Mayer as Gia
- Aura Mijares as Impong Isidra
- Julio Diaz as Gardo Perez
- Nonie Buencamino as Gardo
- Chubi del Rosario as Billy
- Blue de Leon as Benjamin Saavedra
- Anne Curtis as Jasmine
- Melise "Mumay" Santiago as Nina
