= Buttercup (TV series) =

Philippine television drama series

- Title card
- Genre: Teen drama
- Directed by: Wenn V. Deramas
- Starring: Claudine Barretto; Assunta de Rossi; Piolo Pascual; Diether Ocampo; Onemig Bondoc; Ciara Sotto; Mico Palanca
- Opening theme: "Build Me Up Buttercup"
- Country of origin: Philippines
- Original language: Filipino
- No. of episodes: 37

Production
- Executive producer: Ethel Manaloto-Espiritu
- Running time: 45–60 minutes
- Production company: Dreamscape Entertainment

Original release
- Network: ABS-CBN
- Release: May 31, 2003 – February 7, 2004

Buttercup is a Philippine television drama series broadcast by ABS-CBN. Directed by Wenn V. Deramas, it stars Claudine Barretto, Assunta de Rossi, Onemig Bondoc, Ciara Sotto, Mico Palanca, Piolo Pascual, and Diether Ocampo. It premiered on May 31, 2003 on the network's Saturday evening line up. The show concluded on February 7, 2004, with a total of 37 episodes.

== Premise ==
The story revolves around Meg and her friends, who have just finished college and now face different struggles. The group often met at a restaurant called "Buttercup".

== Cast and characters ==
The Cast of Buttercup

Lead cast

- Claudine Barretto as Meg

Main cast

- Assunta de Rossi as Sharon
- Piolo Pascual as Lance
- Diether Ocampo as Winston
- Onemig Bondoc as Wilson
- Carlos Agassi as Pippo
- Ciara Sotto as Sheryl
- Mico Palanca as Chris

Supporting cast

- Rio Locsin as Elsa
- John Arcilla as Orly
- Tin Arnaldo as Caroline Uy
- Ricardo Cepeda as Christopher
- Carmi Martin as Angela
- Jenny Miller as Rochelle
- Tessie Tomas as Erlinda
- Angelu De Leon as Cloe
- Mat Ranillo III as Eduardo
- Buboy Garovillo as Miguel
- Carla Martinez as Carmelita
- Ricky Davao
- Tetchie Agbayani
- Pinky Amador
- Miguel Vera as Rolie
- Frances Ignacio as Lily
- Marjorie Barretto
- Eugene Domingo as Susan
- Angel Jacob as Monica

Guest cast

- Bobby Andrews as Ted
