= Lindsay Custodio =

Filipino actress and singer

- Born: October 22, 1978 (age 47); Alabang, Muntinlupa, Philippines
- Other name: Lindsay Custodio-Platon
- Occupations: Actress; singer
- Years active: 1991–2001
- Spouses: Julius Caesar Platon II (m. 2000; died 2018) Frederick Cale (m. 2022)
- Children: 2

Lindsay Custodio-Cale (born October 22, 1978) is a Filipino former actress and singer.

== Career ==
Custodio was cast in the youth-oriented variety show Ang TV in 1992.

In 1995, she was cast in the romantic dance film Hataw Na.

Custodio appeared in the films Kristo and Ang TV: The Adarna Adventure in 1996. In the same year, her debut album My First was released.

Her second album New Horizons was released in 1998.

== Personal life ==
Custodio was married to Tanauan, Batangas former vice mayor Julius Caesar Platon II from December 2000 until his death in November 2018 on car accident, with whom she has two children, Sean Christopher and Charisse Marianne Custodio Platon. On May 2, 2022, she married Businessman Frederick Cale at a civil wedding ceremony in Muntinlupa. In June 2025, Custodio filed a Violence Against Women and Children (VAWC) complaint against her estranged husband, Frederick Cale.

She is also a traditional Catholic.

== Filmography ==
=== Film ===
Year	Title	Role	Notes	Source
1995	Hataw Na	Cathy Lopez		
1996	Kristo	Salome		
1996	Ang TV Movie: The Adarna Adventure	Prinsesa Cassandra		
1996	Milyonaryong Mini	Tina		
1999	D'Sisters: Nuns of the Above	Daisy		
1999	Desperado: Bahala na ang Itaas			

=== Television ===
Year	Title	Role	Notes	Source
1991	Magic Kamison			
1992–96	Ang TV	Herself		
1993	Kool Skool			
1994–96	Palibhasa Lalake	Lindsay		
1995–2001	ASAP	Herself – host / performer		
1996–1999	GMA Telesine Specials	Various		
1997	Maalaala Mo Kaya		Episode: "Entablado"	
1997	T.G.I.S.	Tricia		
1997–99	Growing Up	Melissa Valenzuela		
1998–99	Tropang Trumpo	Herself		
2000	Sa Bayan...	Herself		

== Discography ==
=== Studio albums ===
Title	Details
My First	Released: 1996; Format: CD, Cassette; Label: Star Music
New Horizons	Released: 1998; Format: CD, Cassette; Label: Star Music

=== Guest appearances ===
List of non-single guest appearances, with other performing artists, showing year released and album name
Title	Year	Other artist(s)	Album
"Sinong May Sabi" (with Marnie Arcilla, Ericka Fife, Joymee Lim, Susan Hosseinzadeh & Lailani Navarro)	1994	None	Ang TV: The Album
"Gotta Groove" (with Ang TV Teens)	1994	Gio Alvarez and Rica Peralejo	Ang TV: The Album
"Tuksuhan"	1997	None	Flames - The Movie (Original Motion Picture Soundtrack)
"Malay Mo"	1997	None	Flames - The Movie (Original Motion Picture Soundtrack)
"I Must Be Dreaming"	1998	Jose Mari Chan	Souvenirs
"Say That You Love Me" (with Roselle Nava and Jolina Magdangal)	1999	None	Hataw Na
"Sa Araw ng Pasko" (as part of all star cast)	1998	None	Sa Araw ng Pasko
"My Only Christmas Wish"	1998	None	Sa Araw ng Pasko
"'Di Ba't Pasko'y Pag-ibig" (as part of all star cast)	1999	None	'Di Ba't Pasko'y Pag-ibig?
"My Only Christmas Wish"	1999	None	Gimik: The Reunion
