= Anna Karenina (1996 TV series) =

Philippine television drama series

- Title card
- Genre: Drama
- Created by: R.J. Nuevas
- Directed by: Gil Tejada Jr.
- Starring: Antoinette Taus; Sunshine Dizon; Kim delos Santos
- Opening theme: "Ikot ng Mundo" by Antoinette Taus
- Country of origin: Philippines
- Original language: Tagalog
- No. of episodes: 286

Production
- Executive producers: Vic del Rosario Jr.; Wilma Galvante
- Camera setup: Multiple-camera setup
- Running time: 90 minutes
- Production company: Viva Television

Original release
- Network: GMA Network
- Release: November 10, 1996 – April 28, 2002

Related
- Anna Karenina (2013)

Anna Karenina (stylized as Annakarenina) is a Philippine television drama series broadcast by GMA Network. Directed by Gil Tejada Jr., it stars Antoinette Taus, Sunshine Dizon and Kim delos Santos all in the title role. It premiered on November 10, 1996 on the network's Sunday afternoon line up. The series concluded on April 28, 2002, with a total of 286 episodes.

A remake aired in 2013.

== Cast and characters ==
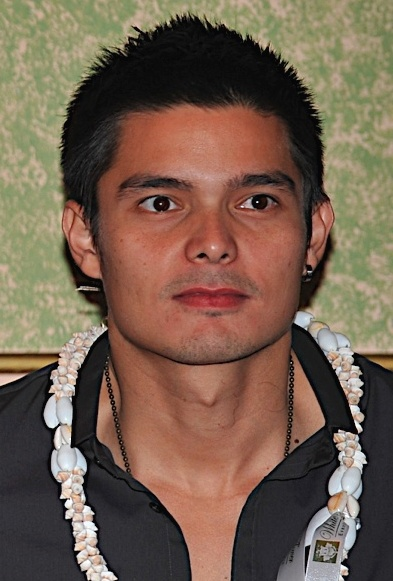
Dingdong Dantes portrays Brix.

Lead cast

- Antoinette Taus as Anna Karenina "Anna" Serrano Monteclaro and Anna Karolina Monteclaro / Victoria "Bekbek"
- Sunshine Dizon as Anna Karenina "Karen" Villarama
- Kim delos Santos as Anna Karenina "Nina" Fuentebella

Supporting cast

- Pinky Amador as Margarita "Maggie" Monteclaro
- Rosemarie Gil as Carmela Cruz-Monteclaro
- Chinggoy Alonzo as Xernan Monteclaro
- Maritoni Fernandez as Ruth Monteclaro
- Dingdong Dantes as Brix
- Polo Ravales as Vincent
- Dino Guevarra as Brian
- Tanya Garcia as Anna Karenina "Grace" San Victores

Recurring cast

- Katya Santos as Carla
- Harold Macasero as Aldrin
- Toby Alejar as Abel
- Mat Ranillo III as Raul
- Czarina Lopez de Leon as Nayda
- Anne Curtis as Ginny
- Chubi del Rosario as Benjie
- Joanne Quintas as Melissa Cruz
- Marky Lopez as Dennis
- Bea Bueno as China
- Kristine Garcia as Agnes
- Aiza Marquez as Samantha
- Ramon Recto as Jim
- Red Sternberg as Milo
- Maui Taylor as Brigitte
- Vivian Foz
- Dimples Romana as younger Carmela
- Rita Avila
- Rufa Mae Quinto as Chona
- Cheska Diaz
- Gloria Diaz
