= Parekoy =

Filipino TV program

- Parekoy logo
- Genre: Sitcom
- Created by: ABS-CBN Studios
- Directed by: Randy L. Santiago; Quark Henares
- Starring: Jason Gainza; John Prats; Zanjoe Marudo
- Theme music composer: Randy Santiago
- Country of origin: Philippines
- Original language: Filipino
- No. of episodes: 73

Production
- Executive producer: Jessamae Samson
- Running time: 30 minutes
- Production company: Dreamscape Entertainment Television

Original release
- Network: ABS-CBN
- Release: January 5 – April 17, 2009

Parekoy (Buddy) is a 2009 Philippine television sitcom series broadcast by ABS-CBN. Directed by Randy L. Santiago and Quark Henares, it stars Jason Gainza, John Prats and Zanjoe Marudo. It aired on the network's Hapontastic line up from January 5 to April 17, 2009, and was replaced by Kambal sa Uma.

== Synopsis ==
Follow the crazy adventures of the PA-pabol waiter Mario (Zanjoe Marudo), the RE-sponsibol nurse Joseph (John Prats), and the KOY-abol messenger Jess (Jayson Gainza) as their friendship keep them together through the tough times. Will the playboy and homophobic Mario be shocked to find out his father's true identity? Can Joseph handle being a good brother to his three sexy younger sisters? For how long will Jess put up with his domineering wife? What long-kept secret will test the brotherly bond of the three?

== Cast ==
=== Main cast ===
- Jason Gainza as Jess
- John Prats as Joseph
- Zanjoe Marudo as Mario

=== Supporting and guest casts ===
- Angelu de Leon as Angelique (special participation)
- Maria Isabel Lopez as Mother Divine
- Tetchie Agbayani as Lucy
- Roy Alvarez as Benjamin
- Dennis Padilla as Bart
- Raymund Concepcion as Henry
- Kitkat as Sharon/Shawie
- Leandro Baldemor as BIGBOSS/Mayor Banal
- Israel Carreon as Younger Mario
- Ronald Jaimeer Humarang as Younger Jess
- Christian Mercado as Younger Joseph
- Kristofer Dangculos as Younger Ringo/Ringo Jr.
- Aria Clemente as Hilary
- Diamond Dela Cruz
- Reginald Marquez as Jules
- Bobby Andrews as Paul
- Long Mejia as Boss Goodie
- Charee Pineda as Toni
- Michelle Carbonell
- Mikylla Ramirez as Fatima
- Igi Boy Flores as Angelito
- Jacq Yu as Britney
- Giselle Sanchez as Glenda
- Irma Adlawan as Ema
- Olive Cortez as Rachelle
- Empress Schuck as Maricorn
- Dawn Jimenez (as Dawn Balagot) as Nikka
- Bodie Cruz
- Jaymee Joaquin as Beverly and Lyka Biscotti
- Janna Dominguez as Ligaya
- Joy Viado as Bart's friend
- Bam Romana as George
- James Blanco as Ting Pao Jr.

== See also ==
- Yu-Gi-Oh Gx
- Aalog-Alog
- List of programs broadcast by ABS-CBN
