= Diego Castro (journalist) =

Filipino actor, broadcaster (born 1975)

- Born: Angelo Diego Keithley Castro III; November 30, 1975 (age 50); Quezon City, Philippines
- Other name: Diego Castro
- Occupations: Actor; broadcaster
- Years active: Actor (1996–2016); News Anchor (2013–present)
- Spouse: Angela Lagunzad (m. 2023)
- Parents: Angelo Castro Jr. (father); June Keithley (mother)
- Relatives: Kenneth Ilagan (cousin); Rico Yan (cousin); Mondo Castro (cousin)

Angelo "Diego" Keithley Castro III (born November 30, 1975), is a Filipino broadcaster and retired actor. He has appeared in over forty movies and dozens of television shows, and was a part of the youth-oriented shows, Gimik and T.G.I.S. He served as the news anchor for One Balita Pilipinas with Cheryl Cosim on One PH from 2022 to 2023 and One News Now on One News from 2023 to 2024. On February 19, 2024, he and his wife, Angela Lagunzad, began anchoring a new hybrid news program called Brunch which currently airs Monday to Friday, 10am to 11am on One News.

== Biography ==
Diego Castro is the only son of veteran broadcast journalists, June Keithley (1947–2013) and the late Angelo Castro Jr. (1945–2012)

He started his career in front of the camera as an actor in a series of soap operas and TV commercials. He started acting in theater at the age of 11, appearing in plays by Fr. James B. Reuter productions.

He is also an accomplished chef. He graduated from Culinary Arts Management in 2004 and was Executive Chef for two major food brands in the Philippines. He currently owns a restaurant called Lord of the Wings.

His background in journalism and interest in cooking led to his role as a resident host and cook on UNTV's morning program Good Morning Kuya.

He has appeared in several TV series in the Philippines, including Esperanza (1997), Growing Up (1997) and Gulong ng Palad (2006) to name a few in ABS-CBN and GMA Network. Kasalanan Bang Ibigin Ka? is considered as Castro's biggest break.

== Filmography ==
=== Television ===
- Gimik (1996) as Jigs Mercado
- Esperanza (1997) as Bernard Castello
- Pangako Sa' Yo (2000) as Lloyd Sandoval
- Sa Dulo Ng Walang Hanggan (2001) as Larry Medrano
- Basta't Kasama Kita (2003) as Borgy
- 30 Days (2004)
- Spirits (2004) as Harvey
- Gulong ng Palad (2006) as Terrence Morales
- Sa Piling Mo (2006) as Marco Jimenez
- Rounin (2007) as Tristan
- Maalaala Mo Kaya: Cellphone (2008) as Chase
- Kasalanan Bang Ibigin Ka? (2012) as Vitto
- The Borrowed Wife (2014) as Carlo
- Strawberry Lane (2014) as Mario Escudero
- Magpakailanman: Boses ng Puso (2015) as John
- Maynila: Party Pa More (2016) as Armand
- Good Morning Kuya (2013–2022)
- One Balita Pilipinas (2022–2023)
- Why News (2015–2022)
- One News Now (2023–2024)
- Brunch on One News (2024–present)

== Personal life ==
Castro married his then-fellow UNTV co-anchor Angela Lagunzad in 2023, after spending twenty years together as a couple.

Prior to his marriage with Lagunzad, Castro was previously married to former actress Raven Villanueva, whom he had a child, Angelica Claire, who later became an actress in GMA Network. Castro also has a daughter named Raffa from another ex-wife, Czarina Polman, a former actress by the name Rina Rosal.
