= Wala Na Bang Pag-ibig? =

- Official movie poster
- Directed by: Mac Alejandre
- Written by: R.J. Nuevas
- Produced by: William Leary
- Starring: Angelu de Leon; Bobby Andrews
- Cinematography: Rolly Manuel
- Edited by: Kelly Cruz
- Music by: Gerdie Francisco
- Production company: Viva Films
- Distributed by: Viva Films
- Release date: October 22, 1997
- Running time: 90 minutes
- Country: Philippines
- Language: Filipino

Wala Na Bang Pag-ibig? is a 1997 Philippine drama film directed by Mac Alejandre. The film stars Angelu de Leon and Bobby Andrews.

== Plot ==
Childhood friends Eric, (Bobby Andrews), Gemma (Angelu de Leon) and Ponsie (Mel Martinez) are elated when they learn they would be classmates in Manila as well. Eric is the weak, fickle-minded playboy. Gemma is the pretty tomboy content to look for girls for her friend Eric. Ponsie, on the other hand, is their gay friend. The situation remains ideal until the arrival of Gemma's cousin, Vivian (Mariel Lopez), who wants Eric as a boyfriend and Gemma promises to make it happen. But Vivian leaves for a three-week stay in the states for an art exhibit and competition. This separation triggers Gemma and Eric to realise and declare their long-hidden feelings for each other. When Vivian returns home to surprise Eric, she gets a surprise instead when she catches an affectionate Gemma and Eric. They fail to resolve the problem because of Eric's inability to decide. He claims to love both Vivian and Gemma. Vivian declares she's not giving up Eric without a fight, never mind if all of them suffer. Realising the futility of it all, Gemma heads back for the province. Will true love triumph over loyalty? Will setting something free really make it come back?

== Cast ==
Main cast

- Angelu de Leon as Gemma
- Bobby Andrews as Eric

Supporting cast

- Mel Martinez as Ponsie
- Mariel Lopez as Vivian
- Maureen Mauricio as Sining
- Joel Torre as Ambo
- Evangeline Pascual as Carmen
- Ramon Recto as Fernan
- Barbie Puzon as Peachy
- Mon Castro as Jim
- Ramon Mateo as Bonn
- Lui Manansala as Tita Laura
- Katya Santos as Adette
- Deña Larosa as Katy
- Iwi Nicolas as Bunsoy
- April Tolentino as Pia
