= Tropang Trumpo =

1994–99 Philippine television sketch comedy show

- Genre: Sketch comedy
- Created by: Associated Broadcasting Company
- Directed by: Jose Javier Reyes (1994); Edgar Mortiz (1994–98); Al Quinn (1998–99)
- Starring: Ogie Alcasid; Michael V. Gelli de Belen; Carmina Villarroel; Earl Ignacio; Smokey Manaloto
- Theme music composer: Michael V.
- Opening theme: "Tropang Trumpo" by Michael V. (1994–96) "Tropang Trumpo" by Legit Misfitz (1996–98)
- Country of origin: Philippines
- Original language: Tagalog
- No. of episodes: 256

Production
- Executive producers: Ina Santos (1994–97); Mon Torres (1997–99)
- Running time: 1 hour (1994–96; 1998–99); 1 hour and 30 minutes (1996–98)

Original release
- Network: ABC 5
- Release: March 12, 1994 – March 13, 1999

Related
- Tropa Mo Ko Unli

Tropang Trumpo (Tagalog for Troop of Tops) is a Philippine television sketch comedy show broadcast by ABC. It aired from March 12, 1994 to March 13, 1999, and was replaced by Ispup.

== History ==
The original cast included Ogie Alcasid, Michael V., Carmina Villarroel, Gelli de Belen, and theatre/voice actors Nonie Buencamino, Manny Castañeda, Earl Ignacio, Sheilou Bharwani, Mhalou Crisologo, Ana Abad Santos and Lorna Gay Long. Tropa originally aired on Friday nights and was directed by Jose Javier Reyes.

However, when Reyes became busy with movies, former Goin' Bananas cast members Edgar "Bobot" Mortiz, Al Tantay and former Goin' Bananas headwriter Dan Salamante came in and assumed the respective posts of director and writers. The ABC management also moved the show to Saturday nights and found greater success in the show's ratings and advertising revenues. Mortiz, Tantay and Salamante introduced new segments for the show, the most famous was Battle of the Brainless, a satirical quiz show sketch parodying the 90s game show Battle of the Brains aired over RPN, where simple quiz questions are never answered. The show went on even when two of its main cast, Michael V. and Ogie Alcasid, left in 1995 to do another gag show for GMA entitled Bubble Gang. It was then that Maoi Roca and Smokey Manoloto joined the show with Gelli de Belen, Carmina Villaroel and Earl Ignacio. The show won as Best Gag Show during the 1995 Star Awards for Television and received regional acclaim as "Highly Commended" in the Best Comedy Programme or Series in the 1996 Asian Television Awards held in Singapore.

Tropang Trumpo started to decline when several new shows started copying its format. In 1997, however, Tropang Trumpo was reformatted again and introduced a new powerful ensemble led by the ever-loyal Smokey Manoloto, Sunshine Cruz and Keempee de Leon. Backing up the main cast were Cholo Escano, Cheska Garcia, Meryll Soriano, Sherilyn Reyes and Marco McKinley. In late 1997 former cast members Gelli de Belen and Carmina Villaroel re-joined the show.

In early 1998, some key people in the production team led by Edgar Mortiz, Al Tantay and Dan Salamante left due to conflict with ABC executives. At the same time, cast members Smokey Manaloto and Keempee de Leon also left to side with their beleaguered director. Mortiz, Tantay, Salamante, Manaloto and de Leon, along with former cast member Earl Ignacio transferred to IBC where they did a new gag show entitled Goin' Bayabas, a spin-off of the 80's gag show Goin' Bananas. The ABC management named Al Quinn and Ding Bolanos as replacements for Tantay and Mortiz, while surviving lead cast members Gelli de Belen, Carmina Villaroel and Candy Pangilinan headlined the reformatted show together with Caloy Alde, Raffy Rodriguez, Diego "Binoy" Salvador and Onemig Bondoc. In mid-1998 de Belen and Villaroel left the show again as the management decided to go with another reformat. Among the new cast members joining the reformatted show were Anjanette Abayari, Rufa Mae Quinto, Lindsay Custodio, Daniel Pasia, Blakdyak and Jake Roxas. It finally closed at the end of the year and was replaced with Ispup.

The show was re-aired from January 6 to November 17, 2001, every Saturdays on the same network airing in 1 hour as Tropang Trumpo: Ang Orig .In 2007, it was re-aired again. This time, it joined forces with Wow Mali!, and Ispup in the show named Comedy Bites, also aired in Saturdays.

A new show entitled Tropa Moko Unli was launched on September 14, 2013, as a part of the Weekend Do It Better programming block on TV5, combining the former shows Tropang Trumpo and Lokomoko U.

From August 7, 2021 to July 31, 2022, selected episodes of "Tropang Trumpo" started to re-air once more when TV5 launched BuKo (TV channel), a cable channel exclusively owned by Cignal.

== Cast ==
- Ogie Alcasid (1994–95)
- Michael V. (1994–95)
- Gelli de Belen (1994–96; 1997–98)
- Carmina Villarroel (1994–96; 1997–98)
- Earl Ignacio (1994–97)
- Nonie Buencamino (1994)
- Shielu Bharwani (1994)
- Manny Castañeda (1994)
- Ana Abad Santos (1994)
- Malou Crisologo (1994–95)
- Jomari Yllana (1994–95)
- Mark Anthony Fernandez (1994–95)
- Eric Fructuoso (1994–95)
- Whitney Tyson (1994–96)
- Smokey Manaloto (1995–98)
- Maoi Roca (1995–1?97)
- Maricel Morales (1995)
- Diego "Binoy" Salvador (1995–99)
- Ariel "Hyubs" Azarcon (1995–98)
- Jennifer Mendoza (1995–96)
- Caloy Alde (1996–99)
- Marco Mckinley (1996–97)
- Leandro Baldemor (1997)
- Meryll Soriano (1997)
- Gary Estrada (1997)
- Sunshine Cruz (1997)
- Keempee de Leon (1997-98)
- Cholo Escano (1997)
- Sherilyn Reyes (1997–98)
- Cheska Garcia (1997–98)
- Candy Pangilinan (1997–99)
- Kevin Vernal (1997–98)
- Onemig Bondoc (1998)
- Raffy Rodriguez (1998–99)
- Anjanette Abayari (1998–99)
- Blakdyak (1998–99)
- Daniel Pasia (1998–99)
- Jake Roxas (1998–99)
- Lindsay Custodio (1998–99)
- Novia (1998–99)
- Rufa Mae Quinto (1998–99)

== Directors ==
- Jose Javier Reyes
- Al Quinn
- Deo Directo
- Edgar Mortiz
- Al Tantay (Writer)
- Dan Salamante (Headwriter/Musical Director)

== Recurring characters and segments ==
=== Recurring Segments ===
- Ana Luha (a parody of Anna Luna)
- Ano Daw?
- Bahaw: Ang Kaning Lamig/Ikalawang Saing (a parody of Valiente)
- Baliw Balita (a parody of Balitang Balita)
- Battle of the Brainless (a parody of Battle of the Brains)
- Brainless Book of World Records (a parody of Guinness World Records)
- Bitoy the Little Boy
- Brainless Name That Tune (a parody of Name That Tune)
- Cookie da Weathergirl/Cookie da Magician
- Chicken/Caronia Dance
- D' Bugs Baron D'Bate (a parody of The Bob Garon Debate)
- Ediboy Scoreless
- E.R. (Emergency Raw) (a parody of Emergency and/or a parody of ER)
- Ikaw At Ang Bata (a parody of Ikaw At Ang Batas)
- Hoy!!! Taksi (a combined parody of Hoy Gising! and Saksi)
- Noon at Ngayon
- Ogag
- Planet of the Ipis (a parody of Planet of the Apes)
- PHLEGMS "Starts with a PH, sounds like an F" (a parody of Flames)
- Stupid Family Feud (a parody of Family Feud)
- Supposed to be, Yun Nga! (a parody of Actually, Yun Na!)
- Top Of The Hour Joke News (a parody of Top Of The Hour News and/or Live on 5)
- Travel with Claire Deyhins
- Usapang Lashing
- Wow Mali! (a bloopers segment)
- X-Treme Baha Stir Olympics (a parody of Star Olympics)

=== Recurring characters ===
- David Semplang/Dave May Sheldan (a parody of David Celdran) - played by Ogie Alcasid and Smokey Manaloto
- Tina Monsoor Kalma (a parody of Tina Monzon-Palma) - played by Carmina Villaroel
- Jose Simpson (a parody of Atty. Jose C. Sison) - played by Michael V.
- Jobart Simpson (a parody of Jopet Sison) - played by Earl Ignacio
- Mike N. Rickett's (a parody of Mike Enriquez and Ronnie Ricketts) - played by Earl Ignacio
- Harem Aguila (a parody of Karen Davila) - played by Carmina Villaroel
- Arnold Camvio (a parody of Arnold Clavio) - played by Smokey Manaloto
- Jesibel Syokoy (a parody of Jessica Soho) - played by Gelli De Belen
- Bugs Baron (a parody of Bob Barron) - played by Earl Ignacio
- Tiyo Vanny Kalbo (a parody of Giovanni Calvo) - played by Smokey Manaloto
- Dalian Carnaval (a parody of Dolly Anne Carvajal) - played by Gelli De Belen
- Tina Monsour Del Rosario (a parody of Tina Monzon-Palma and Monsour del Rosario) - played by Carmina Villaroel
- Tonton Bersolo (a parody of Christine Bersola) - played by Earl Ignacio
- Smokiko Headbanger-lista (a parody of Frankie Evangelista) - played by Smokey Manaloto
- Vivian Salbabida (a parody of Vivian Zalvidea) - played by Cheska Garcia
- Bahaw ang Kaning Lamig characters (a parody of Valiente)
  - Gelli De B as Bettina - played by Gelli De Belen
  - Carmina Villaru as Donya Martina - played by Carmina Villaroel
  - Earl Cio-Igna as Sar. Bayong - played by Earl Ignacio
  - Smokey Makaloto as Don Vitaliano - played by Smokey Manaloto
  - Maoi Coca Roca as Gabriel - played by Maoi Roca
  - Whitney Tutonggi as Clara - played by Whitney Tyson
  - Miguel V. as Conchito - played by Michael V.

== See also ==
- List of TV5 (Philippine TV network) original programming
- Bubble Gang
- Super Laff-In
