= Di Ba't Ikaw =

1999 Philippine television drama series

- Title card
- Also known as: Love and Revenge
- Genre: Romantic drama
- Developed by: Raquel Villavicencio
- Directed by: Maryo J. de los Reyes
- Starring: Jessa Zaragoza; Angelika Dela Cruz; Jomari Yllana; Jao Mapa
- Theme music composer: Vehnee Saturno
- Opening theme: "Di Ba't Ikaw" by Jessa Zaragoza
- Country of origin: Philippines
- Original language: Tagalog
- No. of episodes: 120 + 1 special

Production
- Executive producer: Lilybeth G. Rasonable
- Production locations: Metro Manila, Philippines; Imus, Cavite, Philippines
- Camera setup: Multiple-camera setup
- Running time: 30 minutes
- Production company: GMA Entertainment TV

Original release
- Network: GMA Network
- Release: May 17 – October 29, 1999

Di Ba't Ikaw (transl. isn't it you / international title: Love and Revenge) is a 1999 Philippine television drama romance series broadcast by GMA Network. Directed by Maryo J. de los Reyes, it stars Jessa Zaragoza, Angelika Dela Cruz, Jao Mapa and Jomari Yllana. It premiered on May 17, 1999 on the network's Telebabad line up. The series concluded on October 29, 1999, with a total of 120 episodes.

== Cast and characters ==
Lead cast

- Jessa Zaragoza as Hasmin Cardenas
- Jao Mapa as Victor "Junie" Montecillo Jr.
- Jomari Yllana as Paolo Montecillo

Supporting cast

- Romeo Vasquez as Victor Montecillo
- Pilar Pilapil as Amelia Montecillo
- Edu Manzano as Guiller
- Ciara Sotto as Grace Montecillo
- Angelika Dela Cruz as Eloisa
- Daria Ramirez as Saling
- Julio Diaz as Domeng Cardenas
- Ali Sotto and Jean Saburit as Karina Latada
- Gabby Eigenmann as Alexander "Alex" Montecillo
- Jake Roxas as Berting

Guest cast

- Matthew Mendoza as Dave
- Trina Zuñiga as Celia
- Melissa Mendez as Helen
- Maricar de Mesa as Carla
- Jackie de Guzman as Anita
- Francis Ricafort as Alvin
- Spanky Manikan as Celia's father
- Xaxa Manalo as Celia's friend
