= Ngayong Nandito Ka =

- Official movie poster
- Directed by: Jerry Lopez Sineneng
- Written by: Henry King Quitain
- Produced by: Charo Santos-Concio; Malou N. Santos
- Starring: Kristine Hermosa; Jericho Rosales; Onemig Bondoc
- Cinematography: Ricardo Jose Trofeo
- Edited by: Marya Ignacio
- Music by: Jessie Lasaten
- Production company: Star Cinema
- Distributed by: Star Cinema
- Release date: February 26, 2003 (Philippines)
- Running time: 110 minutes
- Country: Philippines
- Language: Filipino
- Box office: ₱115 million

Ngayong Nandito Ka (Now That You're Here) is a 2003 Filipino romantic drama film written by Henry King Quitain, directed by Jerry Lopez Sineneng, and produced by Star Cinema. The film was theatrically released on February 26, 2003.

== Synopsis ==
Happy couple Rocky and Garie are members of a P-pop band who is set to perform a contractual gig in Japan, but fate has different plans for Rocky when his family business is on the verge of bankruptcy. Facing a delimmna, Rocky is the only one who can save it by marrying the daughter of affluent congressman causing his relationship with Garie to fall apart. Years later, the former lovers meet again and consider rekindling their relationship despite their differences.

== Cast ==
Main cast

- Kristine Hermosa as Margaret "Garie" Cruz
- Jericho Rosales as Enrique "Rocky" Rodriguez
- Onemig Bondoc as Derek Cervantes

Supporting cast

- Dianne dela Fuente as Menchie
- January Isaac as Donna Rodriguez
- Cindy Kurleto as Angela
- Jenny Miller as Mina Cruz
- Angeli Gonzales as Gia Rodriguez
- Sandy Andolong as Naida Cruz
- Toby Alejar as Efren Cruz
- Jaime Fabregas as Don Federico Rodriguez
- Pinky Marquez as Donya Leony Rodriguez
- Carlo Muñoz as Kent Rodriguez
- Marc Acueza as Gilbert Cruz
- Chinggoy Alonzo as Teddy Cervantes
- Karlyn Bayot as Mandy
- Justin Cuyugan as Steven
- Steve Alonzo as Banjo
- Gigette Reyes as Cynthia

== Production ==
After the success of Forevermore (released in June 2002), Rosales and Hermosa became the 2nd on-screen partner ("love team") movie from the top-rating primetime soap opera Pangako Sa 'Yo (2000-2002), where they played the role of Angelo and Yna (together with Bondoc, which also played the role of Errol). The film was shot in Baguio. Jerry Lopez Sineneng was brought on for this film.

== Soundtracks ==
- Ngayong Nandito Ka - Martin Nievera/Divo Bayer
- Magsayawan - Dianne dela Fuente and All Star Cast of the movie
- Afraid For Love to Fade - Jericho Rosales and Kristine Hermosa
- Iniwan Mo - Dianne dela Fuente
- Bakit Ba? - Stagecrew
- Cinderella - Stagecrew
- Bongga Ka Day - Dominic Benedicto
- Huwag Ka Nang Magbabalik - Roselle Nava
