= Maoi Roca =

Filipino basketball player and actor (1974–2022)

Personal information
- Born: December 12, 1974
- Died: January 14, 2022 (aged 47)
- Listed height: 6 ft 4 in (1.93 m)

Career information
- High school: Saint Francis School (San Pedro, Laguna)
- College: De La Salle
- PBA draft: 2001: 4th round, 32nd overall pick
- Drafted by: Tanduay Rhum Masters
- Playing career: 1994–1998

Career history
- 1994–1998: Batangas Blades

Maoi Recampo Roca (December 12, 1974 – January 14, 2022) was a Filipino basketball player and actor.

== Early life ==
Maoi Recampo Roca was born on December 12, 1974. He was introduced to basketball by his athlete father, Bobby Roca. A natural athlete himself, Maoi got obsessed with the sport as a youngster and quickly became well known as he joined every local street league in his hometown in San Pedro, Laguna. His siblings recalled how Maoi, when told to run errands by his mother in the morning, would often forget what he was told to do and just starts playing basketball until almost noon.

As a teenager, he made a name for himself as San Pedro's best varsity basketball player. He was ranked as one of the top High School recruits from his class and various College basketball scouts from Manila were quick to notice the potential of the star way before graduating. After high school, Maoi decided to fulfill his childhood dream of playing for the De La Salle Green Archers.

== Basketball career ==
Roca played for the De La Salle Green Archers at the University Athletic Association of the Philippines (UAAP) from 1994 to 1998. He helped the Archers clinch the Season 61 championship and was named part of the UAAP Mythical Team.

After graduating from college, Roca suited up for the Batangas Blades of the Metropolitan Basketball Association from 1999 to 2000 and later became part of the Tanduay Rhum Masters of the Philippine Basketball Association after he was selected in the 2001 draft although he did not play any game for the team.

== Acting career ==
As an actor, Roca made appearances in Tropang Trumpo of ABC-5 (now TV5) with Carmina Villarroel and Gelli de Belen. He was also a co-host in IBC's Ano Ba’ng Hanap Mo? along with Mickey Ferriols and Hyubs.

== Later life and death ==
Roca has been living in San Pedro, Laguna during his last years. He died on January 14, 2022, due to complications arising from being diabetic.
