= Kim delos Santos =

Filipino-American actress (born 1981)

- Born: Kim Nicole Gehring de los Santos; July 27, 1981 (age 45); New Jersey, United States
- Education: Sunny Hill High School
- Occupations: Actress, model and Nurse
- Years active: 1989–2004
- Known for: Anna Karenina Serrano (Anna Karenina) and Tere Gonzaga (T.G.I.S.)
- Height: 1.57 m (5 ft 2 in)

Kim Nicole Gehring delos Santos (born July 27, 1981), better known as Kim delos Santos or Kim Nicole, is a former actress and television personality in the Philippines who later pursued a career as a nurse in Texas, United States. She made her film debut in Rosenda (1989), where her performance as a child actress earned her the Film Academy of the Philippines award for Best Child Actor. She is best known for her leading roles in the television series Anna Karenina, T.G.I.S., and May Bukas Pa.

== Early life ==
Kim Nicole Gehring delos Santos was born on July 27, 1981, to Hormaidas delos Santos, a stationary engineer in the United States, and Dolores, an American. Her father passed away in 2015 at the age of 67.

She has one brother, Eddie delos Santos, who was a former child actor.

== Career ==
=== Becoming an artist ===
Kim began her career with an appearance in the 1989 film Rosenda, portraying the daughter of characters played by Janice de Belen and Gabby Concepcion. Her performance earned her the Film Academy of the Philippines award for Best Child Performance.

She rose to prominence in the 1990s through her roles in the GMA Network television series T.G.I.S. and Anna Karenina, while under contract with Viva Films. Anna Karenina aired from 1996 to 2002, making it the longest-running drama series on GMA Network. Delos Santos played Nina, one of the three central characters, alongside Anna (played by Antoinette Taus) and Karen (played by Sunshine Dizon).

She also appeared in several films, including Where 'D' Girls 'R' (1996), Laging Naroon Ka (1997), and Azucena (2000). In addition, she starred in T.G.I.S.: The Movie (1997), a film adaptation of the popular television series.

=== Becoming a nurse ===
In 2004, Delos Santos left show business and migrated to the United States. She attended nursing school and initially worked as a Licensed Practical Nurse (LPN) at a clinic in Houston, Texas, while also working in a restaurant.

She later pursued advanced studies, earning a Master of Science in Nursing and qualifying as a psychiatric mental health nurse practitioner.

== Personal life ==
Kim experienced a thyroid condition that led to weight gain. She and her former loveteam partner and co-star Dino Guevarra later became a couple.

Delos Santos married Guevarra in a civil ceremony officiated by Mayor JV Ejercito of San Juan, Metro Manila, on January 9, 2002. Their love story was later featured in an episode of Magpakailanman on GMA Network in 2003. After two years of marriage, the couple separated following a physical altercation. Delos Santos subsequently migrated to the United States, and their marriage was annulled in 2010. In 2013, she and Guevarra reconciled but their relationship eventually ended.

She was later engaged to her longtime boyfriend Ben-G, but their engagement ended after 11 years together.

== Filmography ==
=== Films ===
Year	Title	Role	Notes
1997	T.G.I.S The Movie	Tere	
1997	Isinakdal ko ang Aking Ina	Rica	
1998	Ang Lahat ng Ito'y Para Sa 'Iyo	May	
1999	Sumigaw Ka Hanggang Gusto Mo	Jennifer	
1999	My Pledge of Love	Cathy	
1999	Honey, My Love, So Sweet	Cecille	
1999	Dahil May Isang Ikaw	Marsha	
1999	Ikaw Lamang	Ella	
1999	Kiss Mo 'Ko		

=== Television ===
Year	Title	Role
1992	5 and Up	Herself
1992–95	The Whimpols	Herself/ Host
1996	Anna Karenina	Nina
1997	T.G.I.S.	Tere
1998	Ganyan Kita Kamahal	Irene
1998	Halik sa Apoy	Doreen
1999	May Bukas Pa	Charlie Miguel
2001	Kakabakaba	Halina sa Haunted Hotel
2003	Magpakailanman	Herself
