= Agawin Mo Man ang Lahat =

2006 Philippine television drama series

- Title card
- Also known as: Stolen Love
- Genre: Romantic drama
- Directed by: Ruel S. Bayani
- Starring: Oyo Boy Sotto; Marian Rivera
- Theme music composer: Ogie Alcasid
- Opening theme: "Minamahal Kita" by Ogie Alcasid
- Country of origin: Philippines
- Original language: Tagalog
- No. of episodes: 123

Production
- Executive producers: Malou Choa-Fagar; Wilma Galvante
- Producer: Antonio P. Tuviera
- Camera setup: Multiple-camera setup
- Running time: 30–45 minutes
- Production company: TAPE Inc.

Original release
- Network: GMA Network
- Release: February 20 – August 11, 2006

Agawin Mo Man ang Lahat (transl. even if you take everything / international title: Stolen Love) is a 2006 Philippine television drama romance series broadcast by GMA Network. Directed by Ruel S. Bayani, it stars Oyo Boy Sotto and Marian Rivera. It premiered on February 20, 2006, on the network's Dramarama sa Hapon line up. The series concluded on August 11, 2006, with a total of 123 episodes.

== Cast and characters ==
Cast

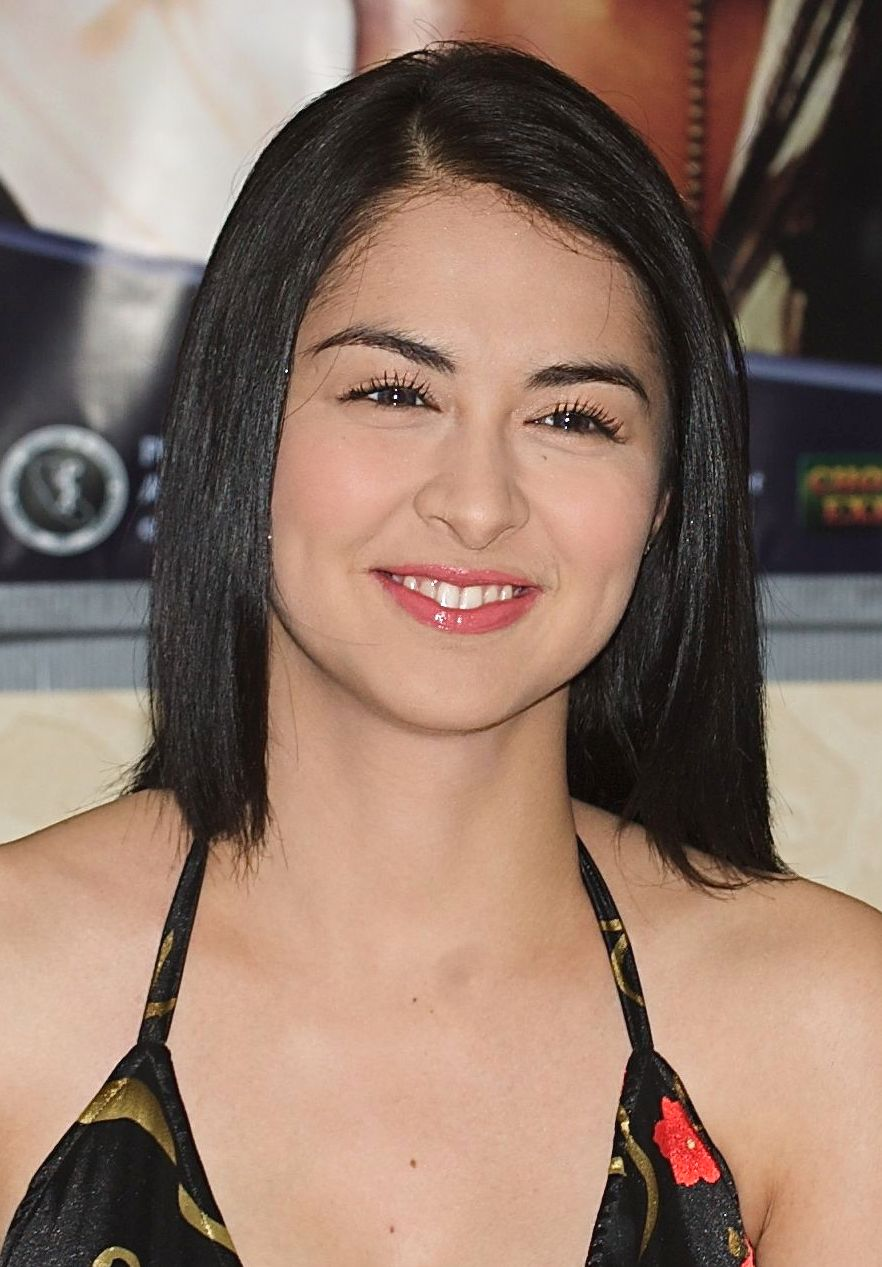
Marian Rivera

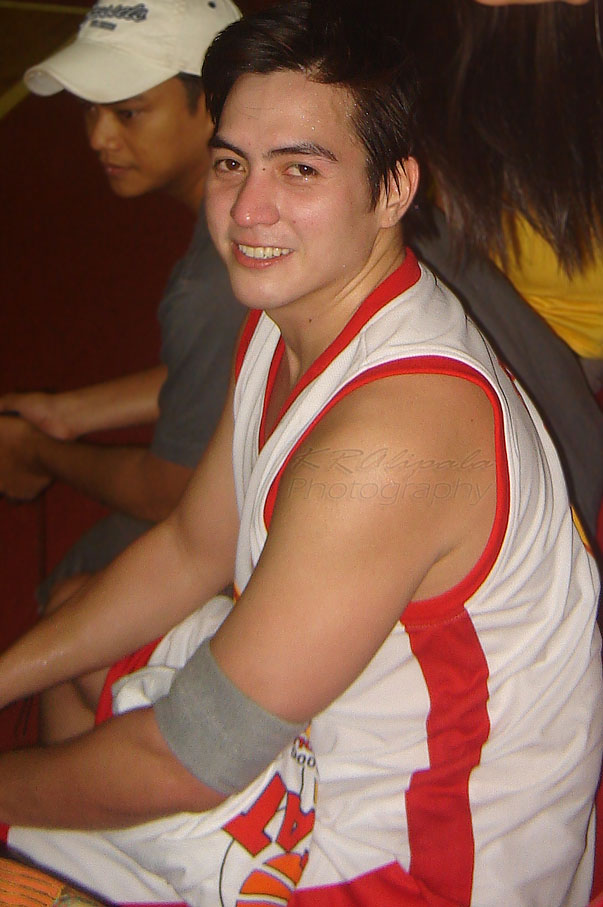
Wendell Ramos

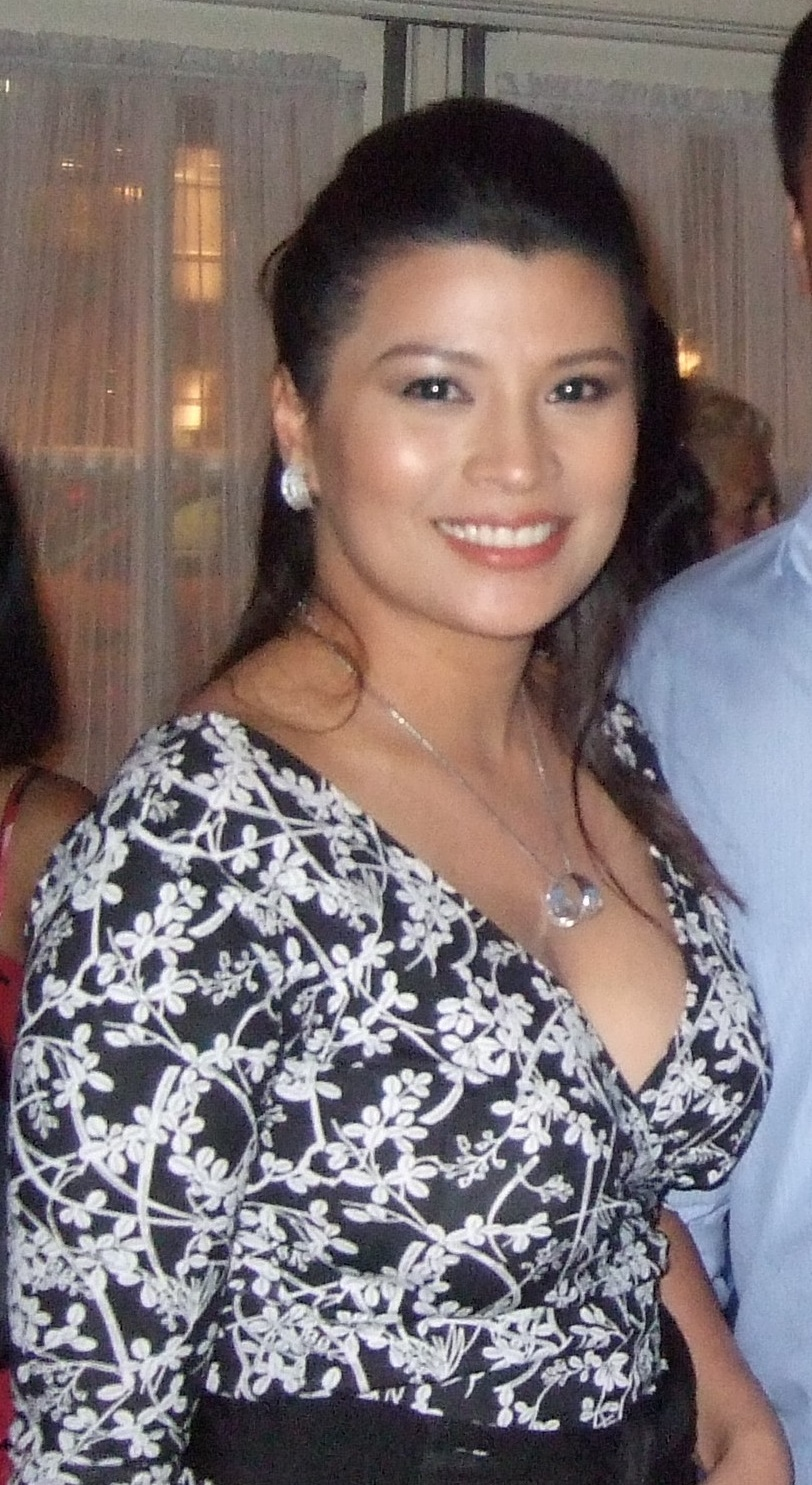
Mylene Dizon

Lead cast

- Marian Rivera as Almira Dueñas-Valverde / Isadora Valencia / Alegra
- Oyo Boy Sotto as Nicolas "Nick" Valverde

Supporting cast

- Bobby Andrews as Gonzalo Valverde
- Mylene Dizon as Greta Valverde
- Rita Avila as Clara Dueñas
- LJ Moreno as Leda
- Perla Bautista as Meding Dueñas
- Jake Roxas
- Bernadette Allyson as Elizabeth "Beth" Lizadores
- Cheska Garcia as Sissy Lizadores-Valverde
- Matthew Mendoza as Chuck Lizadores
- Alma Lerma
- Gandong Cervantes
- Kookoo Gonzales
- Bea Candaza
- Martin Escudero as Emmanuel "Emman" Dueñas
- Kevin Santos
- Luz Imperial
- Frances Ignacio as Ingrid
- Bugs Daigo
- CJ Ramos
- Neil Ryan Sese as Teodoro "Teddy" Besa
- Carlene Aguilar as Giselle
- Peter Serrano
- Kakai Bautista as Rita
- Joel Molina
- Kevin Harris as Nol
- Malou Crisologo

Guest cast

- Nonie Buencamino as Ceding Dueñas
- Wendell Ramos as Tristan
- Johnny Revilla as Feliciano
- Arci Muñoz as Chantal

== Accolades ==
Accolades received by Agawin Mo Man ang Lahat
Year	Award	Category	Recipient	Result	Ref.
2006	20th PMPC Star Awards for Television	Best New Female TV Personality	Marian Rivera	Won	
