= Sana ay Ikaw na Nga (2001 TV series) =

Philippine television drama series

- Title card
- Also known as: It Might Be You
- Genre: Romantic drama
- Directed by: Gil Tejada Jr.
- Starring: Dingdong Dantes; Tanya Garcia
- Theme music composer: Cecille Azarcon
- Opening theme: "Sana'y Ikaw na Nga" by Janno Gibbs and Jaya
- Country of origin: Philippines
- Original language: Tagalog
- No. of episodes: 361

Production
- Camera setup: Multiple-camera setup
- Running time: 30–45 minutes
- Production company: GMA Entertainment TV

Original release
- Network: GMA Network
- Release: December 3, 2001 – April 25, 2003

Related
- Sana ay Ikaw na Nga (2012)

Sana ay Ikaw na Nga (transl. hope it is really you / international title: It Might Be You) is a Philippine television drama romance series broadcast by GMA Network. Directed by Gil Tejada Jr., it stars Tanya Garcia and Dingdong Dantes. It premiered on December 3, 2001. The series concluded on April 25, 2003, with a total of 361 episodes.

The series is streaming online on YouTube. A remake aired in 2012.

== Cast and characters ==
Cast

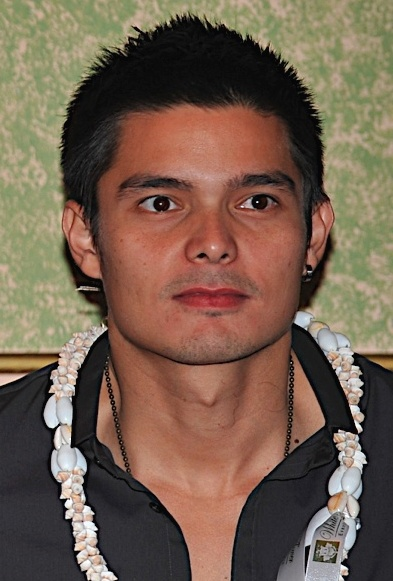
Dingdong Dantes

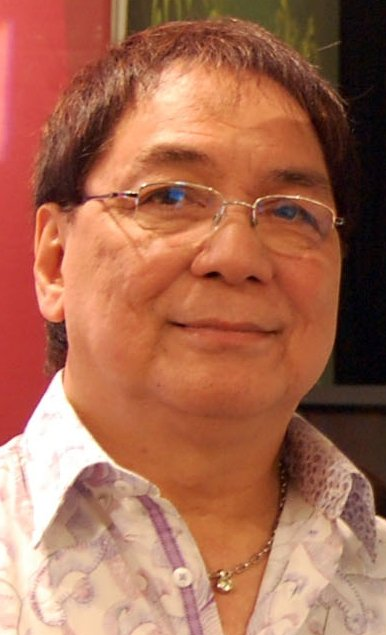
Joey de Leon

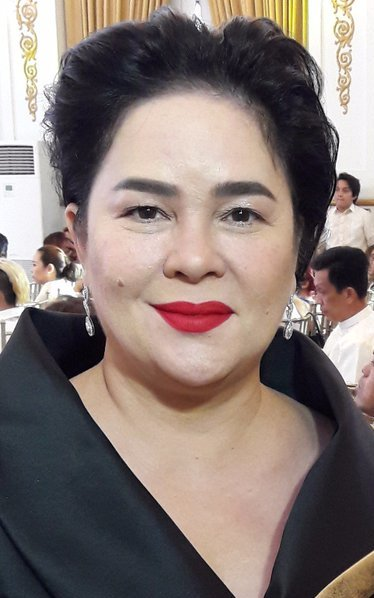
Jaclyn Jose

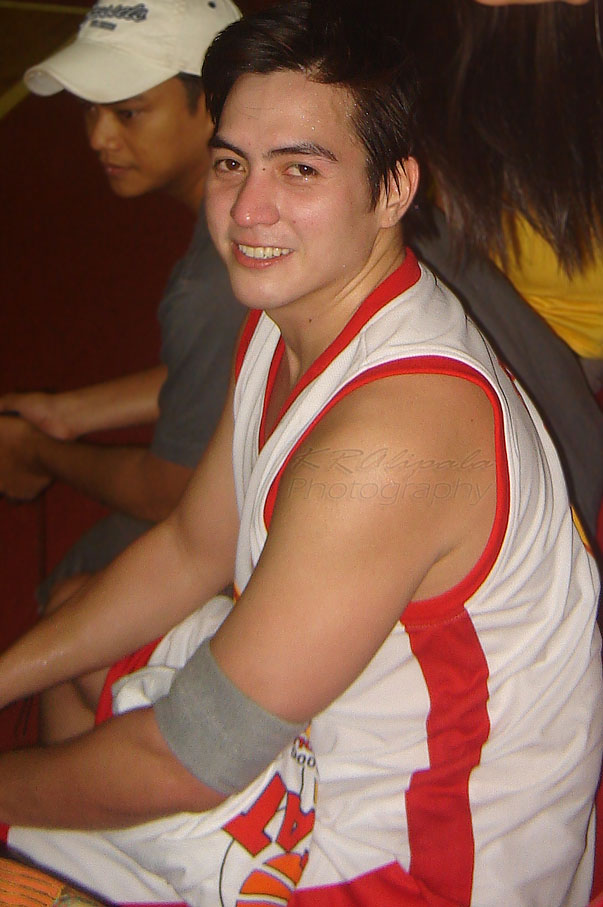
Wendell Ramos

Lead cast

- Tanya Garcia as Cecilia Fulgencio-Altamonte / Margarita Zalameda
- Dingdong Dantes as Carlos Miguel Altamonte

Supporting cast

- Maricar de Mesa as Olga Villavicer / Vanessa Del Rio / Samantha Aguirre
- Eric Quizon as Gilbert Zalameda
- Nancy Castiglione as Patrice Saavedra
- Angelu de Leon as Agnes Consuelo Villavicer
- Bobby Andrews as Vladimir Gaston
- Antoinette Taus as Rosemarie Madrigal
- Joey de Leon as Ricardo Peron
- Tirso Cruz III as Juancho Fulgencio
- Jaclyn Jose as Mariana Madrigal-Fulgencio / Mariana Madrigal-Peron
- Elizabeth Oropesa as Victoria Altamonte
- Chinggoy Alonzo as Ramon Altamonte
- Wendell Ramos as Jose Enrique Altamonte
- Roxanne Barcelo as Eloisa Fulgencio
- Kevin Vernal as Apollo
- Meryll Soriano as Esme

Recurring cast

- King Alcala as Jimboy Villavicer
- Monina Bagatsing as Alyssa
- Aleck Bovick as Yvonne
- Robin Da Rosa as JC Fulgencio
- Dexter Doria as Rebecca
- Ryan Eigenmann as Leroy Zalameda
- Cheska Garcia as Charity Gaston
- Vanna Garcia as Frances Peron
- Mel Kimura as Anna
- Maureen Larrazabal as Pandora
- Lala Montelibano as Ambrosia
- Tita Muñoz as Doña
- Miles Poblete as Ponyang
- Tiya Pusit as Ising
- Biboy Ramirez as Guiller
- Dennis Roldan as Amadeus
- Red Sternberg as Raul Gaston
- Marita Zobel as Mona

Guest cast

- Marianne dela Riva
- Roy Alvarez
- Bernadette Allyson
- Kier Legaspi
- L.A. Mumar
- Julia Montes as Danica
- Jaime Fabregas
- Isko Moreno
- Ilonah Jean
- Jet Alcantara
- Via Veloso
- Lara Fabregas
- Wendy Fernado
- Tessie Villarama
- Pia Pilapil
- Gabby Eigenmann
- Marcus Madrigal
- Dino Guevara
- Kristopher Peralta
- Raquel Montesa
- Tricia Roman
- Leandro Valdemor
- Odette Khan
- Yraz Melchor
- Eagle Riggs
- Rachel Tan-Carrasco
