= T.G.I.S. =

Philippine television drama series

- Title card
- Genre: Teen drama
- Developed by: Kit Villanueva-Langit
- Directed by: Mark A. Reyes; Dominic Zapata
- Starring: Bobby Andrews; Onemig Bondoc; Angelu de Leon; Michael Flores; Rica Peralejo; Ciara Sotto; Red Sternberg; Raven Villanueva; Maybelyn dela Cruz; Bernadette Allyson; Dingdong Dantes; Antoinette Taus; Anne Curtis; Sunshine Dizon; Polo Ravales; Kim delos Santos; Dino Guevarra
- Opening theme: "T.G.I.S. Theme (Thank God It's Sabado)" by DP2; "Dyslexic Heart" by Paul Westerberg; "Walking on Sunshine" by Katrina and the Waves
- Country of origin: Philippines
- Original language: Tagalog
- No. of episodes: 233

Production
- Executive producer: Veronique del Rosario-Corpuz
- Producer: Leny C. Parto
- Production locations: Manila, Philippines
- Cinematography: Monino Duque; Jay Linao
- Camera setup: Multiple-camera setup
- Running time: 32–53 minutes
- Production company: Viva Television

Original release
- Network: GMA Network
- Release: August 12, 1995 – November 27, 1999

Related
- T.G.I.S. The Movie; Growing Up; Teen Gen

T.G.I.S. is a Philippine television teen drama series broadcast by GMA Network. Directed by Mark A. Reyes and later Dominic Zapata, it stars Bobby Andrews, Angelu de Leon, Onemig Bondoc, Michael Flores, Raven Villanueva, Red Sternberg, Dingdong Dantes, Antoinette Taus, Sunshine Dizon and Anne Curtis. It premiered on August 12, 1995, on the network's Saturday line up. The series concluded on November 27, 1999, with a total of 233 episodes.

The series is streaming online on YouTube. The series was followed by a spin-off film, T.G.I.S. The Movie and two television series, Growing Up and Teen Gen.

== Cast and characters ==
Cast

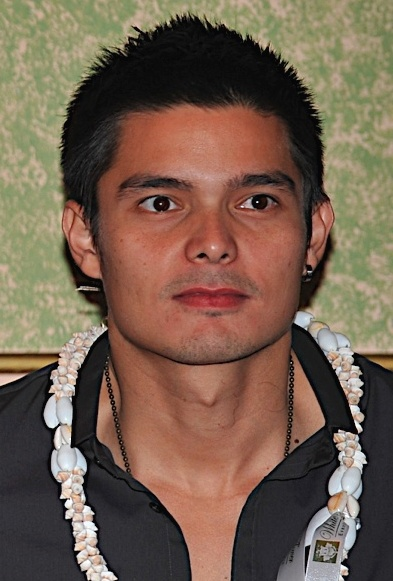
Dingdong Dantes

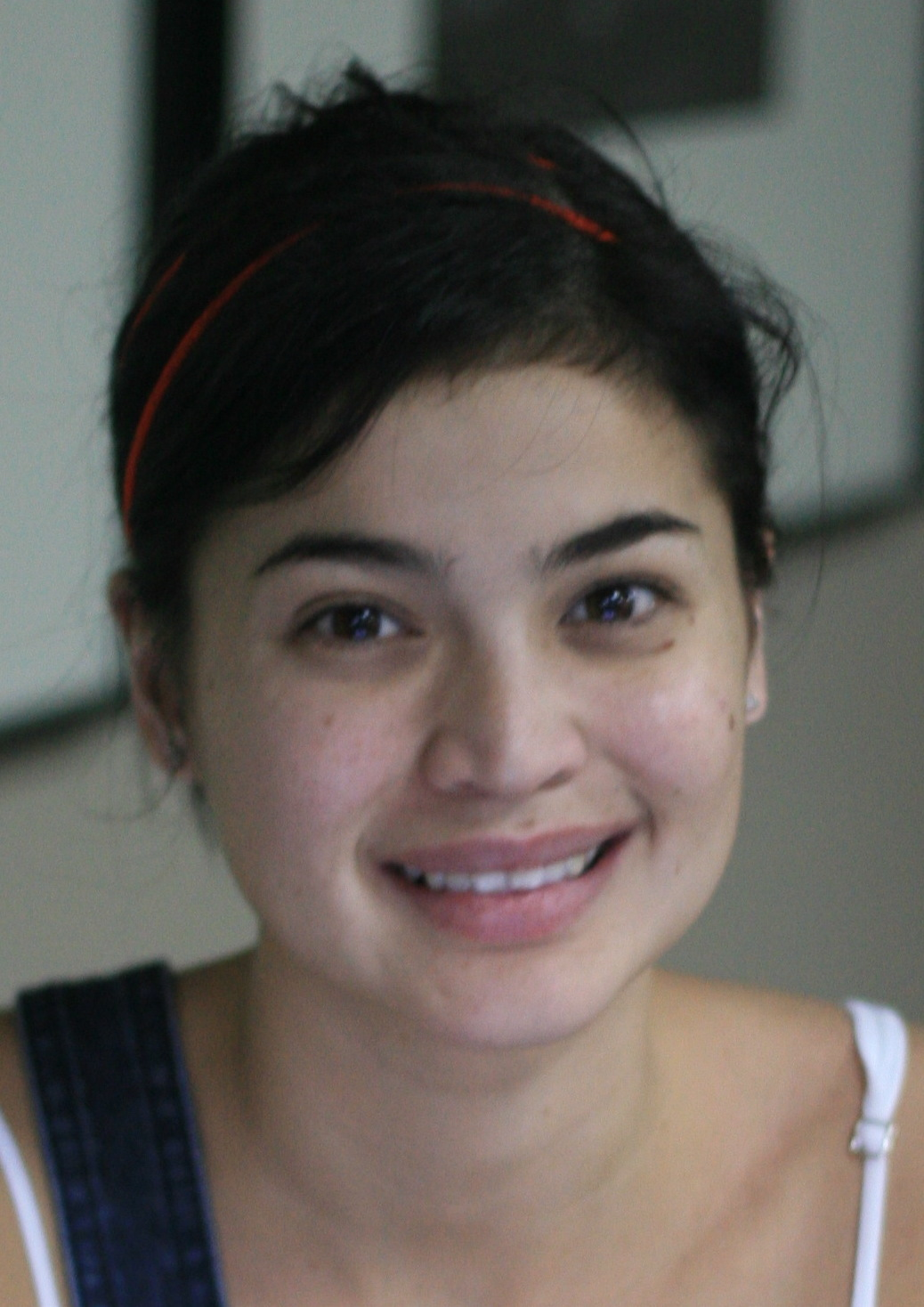
Anne Curtis

- Angelu de Leon as Maria Patrice "Peachy" Real
- Bobby Andrews as Joaquin "Wacks" Torres III
- Michael Flores as Miguel "Mickey" Ledesma
- Red Sternberg as Francisco Martin "Kiko" Arboleda De Dios
- Raven Villanueva as Cristina "Cris" De Guzman
- Maybelyn dela Cruz as Maruja
- Lester Llansang as Casper
- Bernadette Allyson as Beatrice "Bea" Santillan
- Idelle Martinez as Samantha Real
- Kim delos Santos as Tere Gonzaga
- Chico Ventosa as Gabby Torres
- Onemig Bondoc as Jose Mari "JM" Rodriguez
- Rica Peralejo as Michelle "Mitch" Ferrer
- Ciara Sotto as Regina "Rain" Abrera
- Dingdong Dantes as Iñaki Torres
- Antoinette Taus as Bianca de Jesus
- Chantal Umali as Happy
- Kenneth Cajucom as Marciano "Marci" Macatangay
- Chubi del Rosario as Reyster
- Anne Curtis as Emily "Em"
- Polo Ravales as Inocencio "Ice" Martinez
- Sunshine Dizon as Carla "Calai" Escalante
- Dino Guevarra as David
- Ardie Aquino as Benjo
- Jam Melendez as Jag
- Jason Aguilar as Bullet
- Mark Stefens as Zyron
- Aiza Marquez as Billie
- Vanna Garcia
- Maui Taylor as Marie
- Jake Roxas as Noel Santa Maria
- Joseph Izon as Nicko
- Erwin Aquino as Paolo
- Shielu Bharwani as Wacks' date
- Amanda Page as Amy
- Diego Castro
- Victoria Haynes as a student

== Development ==
T.G.I.S. was first directed by Mark A. Reyes with story by Kit Villanueva-Langit. The title of the show was conceptualized by Reyes to mean "Thank God It's Sabado," which was derived from commercials of Jollibee ("I Love You Sabado") and San Miguel Beer (Sabado Nights), and the expression "Thank God It's Friday," replacing the Friday with Sabado (the Tagalog word for Saturday).

== Music ==
The opening theme of the show was originally "Dyslexic Heart" by Paul Westerberg that was taken from the Singles film. It was later changed to "Walking on Sunshine" by Katrina and the Waves.

== Accolades ==
Accolades received by T.G.I.S.
Year	Award	Category	Recipient	Result	Ref.
1997	Catholic Mass Media Awards	Best Teen-Oriented Show	T.G.I.S.	Won	
1997	Japan TV Festival	Crossword Puzzle OBB	T.G.I.S.	Bronze	
1997	New York TV Festival	Best Drama Show	T.G.I.S.	Finalist	
1997	11th PMPC Star Awards for Television	Best Youth-Oriented Show	T.G.I.S.	Won	
1998	12th PMPC Star Awards for Television	Best TV Special Winner	"TGI-Xmas"	Won	
1998	12th PMPC Star Awards for Television	Best Youth-Oriented Show	T.G.I.S.	Won	

== Spin-offs ==
In 1997, the film adaption of T.G.I.S – T.G.I.S. The Movie was released. Directed by Mark A. Reyes, the cast of the TV series—Angelu de Leon, Bobby Andrews, Rica Peralejo, Onemig Bondoc, Raven Villanueva, Michael Flores, Ciara Sotto and Red Sternberg reprised their roles. Viva Films and GMA Films served as the distributors. A television series, Growing Up also aired on GMA Network, featuring the cast of T.G.I.S. In December 2012, a second television spin-off, Teen Gen premiered on GMA Network.
