= Halik sa Apoy =

Philippine television drama series

- Title card
- Also known as: Fiery Kiss
- Genre: Romantic drama
- Developed by: R.J. Nuevas
- Directed by: Jay Altarejos
- Starring: Carmina Villarroel; Ynez Veneracion; Bobby Andrews
- Theme music composer: Alvina Eileen Sy; Diane Warren
- Opening theme: "Ano Bang Meron Ka?" by Zsa Zsa Padilla
- Ending theme: "I Love You, Goodbye" by Céline Dion
- Country of origin: Philippines
- Original language: Tagalog
- No. of episodes: 145

Production
- Executive producer: Veronique del Rosario-Corpuz
- Production locations: Metro Manila, Philippines
- Camera setup: Multiple-camera setup
- Running time: 30 minutes
- Production company: Viva Entertainment

Original release
- Network: GMA Network
- Release: August 10, 1998 – February 26, 1999

Halik sa Apoy (transl. kiss on fire / international title: Fiery Kiss) is a Philippine television drama romance series broadcast by GMA Network. Directed by Jay Altarejos, it stars Carmina Villarroel, Ynez Veneracion and Bobby Andrews. It premiered on August 10, 1998. The series concluded on February 26, 1999, with a total of 145 episodes.

== Cast and characters ==
Lead cast

- Carmina Villarroel as Alyssa Lambino
- Ynez Veneracion as Maricar
- Bobby Andrews as Carlo

Supporting cast

- Celia Rodriguez as Tuding
- Tirso Cruz III as Benjamin Rosales
- Kim Delos Santos as Mylene
- Dino Guevarra as Jilmer
- Jake Roxas as Benj
- Jay Manalo as Jonas
- Ciara Sotto as Adelle
- Marianne dela Riva as Lorreine

Recurring cast

- Daria Ramirez as Trining
- Rachel Alejandro as Maxine
- Mariel Lopez as Alexis
- Dexter Doria as Cora
- Maria Isabel Lopez as Marta
- Katya Santos as Shiela
- Timmy Cruz as Toyang
- Eula Valdez as Delia
- Tanya Gomez as Mameng
- Teresa Loyzaga as Beatriz
- Polo Ravales as Ricky
- Joyce Jimenez as Trixie
