= Ganyan Kita Kamahal =

1998 Philippine television drama series

- Title card
- Also known as: That's How Much I Love You
- Genre: Romantic drama
- Developed by: R.J. Nuevas
- Directed by: Jay Altarejos
- Starring: Carmina Villarroel; Bobby Andrews; Onemig Bondoc
- Theme music composer: Jimmy Borja
- Opening theme: "Ganyan Kita Kamahal" by Zsa Zsa Padilla
- Country of origin: Philippines
- Original language: Tagalog
- No. of episodes: 85

Production
- Executive producer: Veronique del Rosario-Corpuz
- Production locations: Metro Manila, Philippines
- Camera setup: Multiple-camera setup
- Running time: 30 minutes
- Production company: Viva Television

Original release
- Network: GMA Network
- Release: April 13 – August 7, 1998

Ganyan Kita Kamahal (trans. / international title: That's How Much I Love You) is a 1998 Philippine television drama romance series broadcast by GMA Network. Directed by Jay Altarejos, it stars Carmina Villarroel, Bobby Andrews and Onemig Bondoc. It premiered on April 13, 1998. The series concluded on August 7, 1998, with a total of 85 episodes.

== Cast and characters ==
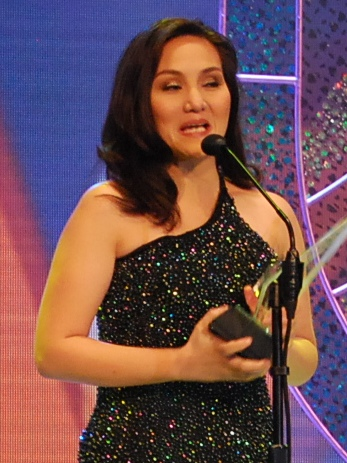
Gladys Reyes portrays Gwen.

Lead cast

- Carmina Villarroel as Eloisa Espiritu
- Bobby Andrews as Henry Cortez
- Onemig Bondoc as Jules Alonzo

Supporting cast

- Sandy Andolong as Teresa
- Gladys Reyes as Gwen
- Bart Guingona as Julian
- Ramon Recto as Gonzalo
- Dindi Gallardo as Greta
- Kim delos Santos as Isabel
- Dino Guevarra as Marlon
- Angela Zamora as Bettina

Recurring cast

- Lee Robin Salazar
- Katya Santos
- Carmen Enriquez
- Ynez Veneracion
- Nonie Buencamino
- Maureen Mauricio
- Richard Quan
- Sheree Lara
- Joko Diaz
- Maricel Morales
- Naty Santiago
- Ardie Aquino
