= Antoinette Taus =

Filipino-American actress (born 1981)

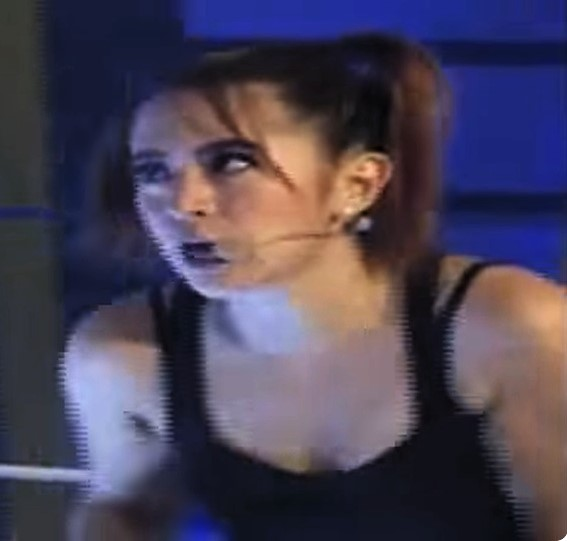
- Taus on Eat Bulaga! "BoxSing" Challenge Accepted in 2016
- Born: Antoinette Cherish Flores Taus; August 30, 1981 (age 45); Angeles City, Pampanga, Philippines
- Other names: Antoinette, Toni
- Education: Political science
- Alma mater: Ateneo de Manila University
- Occupations: Actress, model, singer, host, humanitarian, SDGs advocate
- Years active: 1992–2006; 2014–present
- Known for: Anna Karenina Serrano (Anna Karenina); Bianca de Jesus (T.G.I.S.); Alicia "Allie" Mendoza (Click)
- Height: 1.53 m (5 ft 0 in)
- Website: Official Website; Official FB Page

Antoinette Cherish Flores Taus (born August 30, 1981) is a Filipino-American actress and environmentalist. Taus started out as a child actress for ABS-CBN and Viva and rose to popularity starring in the GMA drama series Anna Karenina (1996–2002), T.G.I.S. (1995–1999) and Click (1999–2004), where she was first paired with Dingdong Dantes. Taus famously hosted the Philippine coverage of BBC Millennium Celebration 2000 Today, which was broadcast over 67 countries around the world. She spent ten years living in Los Angeles. She recently has returned to the Philippines to resume her career.

Aside from her showbiz stints, she is actively part of humanitarian works and serves as an advocate in various campaigns about climate change and mental health. She founded the non-profit Cora and is a UN Environment Programme Goodwill Ambassador.

== Life and career ==
Antoinette Taus was born on August 30, 1981, to Thomas Sr. and Maria Corazon Flores Taus. Her younger brother Tom, a DJ who lives in the United States, is the former child actor who starred in Cedie (1996). Taus started out as a child actress under the agency ABS-CBN Talent Center. She appeared on the ABS-CBN children's television series Hiraya Manawari and in Patayin Sa Sindak si Barbara (1996) as the possessed daughter of Dawn Zulueta's character.

In 1996, Taus moved to VIVA Artists Agency and got a lead role in Anna Karenina (1996–2002), a VIVA-produced teledrama which aired weekly on GMA-7. She played the kind and reserved Anna Serrano, one of three girls claiming to be the titular missing heiress. Anna Karenina's success led to Taus being cast as Bianca in the second batch of the GMA weekly teenage drama T.G.I.S. (1995–1999).

After her mother died from cancer in 2004, Taus became depressed and organized a feeding program to cope. Although it was intended to be a one-off event, Taus was inspired to continue after it received attention on social media and eventually founded Communities Organized for Resource Allocation (CORA), a non-profit organization named for her mother.

== Filmography ==
=== Film ===
Year	Title	Role
1993	Kung Ako'y Iiwan Mo	Alice
1994	Greggy en' Boogie: Sakyan mo na lang, Anna	Buchikik
1994	Hindi Pa Tapos Ang Labada, Darling	Tonette
1995	Patayin sa Sindak si Barbara	Karen
1997	Hanggang Ngayon Ika'y Minamahal	Patricia Perez
1998	I'm Sorry, My Love	Ria
1999	Honey, My Love, So Sweet	Jenny
1999	Kiss Mo 'Ko	Clarisse Mallari
2001	Tabi Tabi Po	Cathy (segment "Engkantada")
2001	Carta Alas... Huwag Ka Nang Humirit	Andy
2016	Lumayo Ka Nga sa Akin	Señorita Avila (segment "Asawa Ni Marie")
2016	Every Room is a Planet	Dra. Cara

=== Television ===
Year	Title	Role(s)
1993–1996	Ang TV	Herself
1993–1995	Oki Doki Doc	Antoinette / Tonette
1995–1996	ASAP	Herself
1996–2000	Anna Karenina	Anna Karenina "Anna" Serrano Monteclaro
1997–1999	T.G.I.S.	Bianca de Jesus
1997–2004	SOP	Herself
1999–2001	GMA Love Stories	Various roles/Herself
1999–2000	2000 Today: Philippines Broadcast	Herself
2000	Munting Anghel	Florence
2000	Tago Ka Na!	Jude
2000–2001	Click	Allie
2001–2002	Anna Karenina	Victoria "Bekbek" / Anna Karolina Monteclaro
2001	Larawan Presents: Antoinette Taus	Herself
2001–2002	Sana ay Ikaw na Nga	Rosemarie Madrigal
2004	Kakabakaba	
2008	Dear Friend	Audrey
2011	The Sing-Off	Herself
2014–present	Especially for You	VJ
2015	Bridges of Love	Camille Panlilio
2015	Maalaala Mo Kaya: Picture	Cheche
2016	Tubig at Langis	Nancy Agoncillo
2016	Wattpad: Hiling	
2016	FPJ's Ang Probinsyano	Maggie Padua
2016	Ipaglaban Mo: Kasambahay	Vicky
2016	The Wives of House No. 2	Maria
2019	Where To Next?	Herself

=== Theatre ===
- The Wizard of Oz
- I Ought to be in Pictures
- Les Misérables (as Gavroche)
- The Little Mermaid at the Ayala Center (2003)
- Grease The Musical (as Betty Rizzo, 2014)
- Bituing Walang Ninging The Musical (as Lavinia Arguelles, 2015)

== Discography ==
=== Album ===
Year	Album	Label	Certification
1997	First Voice	Viva Records	PARI Gold

=== Single ===
Year	Song	Album
2000	Give Thanks	Servant of All (Under Viva Records)
2002	Mamacita, Donde Esta Santa Claus	Give Love On Christmas Day (Under Viva Records)
2002	Nag-iisang Ikaw	VIVA Greats Sing Saturno Hits (Under Viva Records)

== Philanthropy ==
Aside from her stints on television, she is currently active on advocating Sustainable Development Goals, and Mental Health in the Philippines. She founded an organization named CORA (Communities Organized for Resource Allocation) that aims to help the need especially the poor, and to raise awareness and take actions against environmental problems like climate change.) On September 26, 2019, Antoinette Taus was hailed as National Goodwill Ambassador for the Philippines by UN Environment Programme to continually promote sustainability and environmental protection.
