= Growing Up (1997 Philippine TV series) =

Philippine television drama series

- Title card
- Genre: Drama
- Developed by: Kit Villanueva-Langit
- Written by: Kit Villanueva-Langit
- Directed by: Mark A. Reyes
- Starring: Angelu de Leon; Bobby Andrews; Onemig Bondoc; Red Sternberg; Raven Villanueva; Michael Flores; Donna Cruz; Jake Roxas
- Theme music composer: Paul Westerberg
- Opening theme: "Dyslexic Heart" by Paul Westerberg; "Walking on Sunshine" by Katrina and the Waves; "Build Me Up, Buttercup" by The Foundations
- Country of origin: Philippines
- Original language: Tagalog
- No. of episodes: 88

Production
- Executive producer: Neil del Rosario
- Producer: Leny C. Parto
- Production locations: Manila, Philippines
- Cinematography: Monino Duque; Jay Linao
- Camera setup: Multiple-camera setup
- Running time: 60 minutes
- Production company: Viva Television

Original release
- Network: GMA Network
- Release: June 2, 1997 – February 12, 1999

Related
- T.G.I.S.

Growing Up is a Philippine television drama series broadcast by GMA Network. The series served as a sequel to the Philippine television series T.G.I.S. Directed by Mark A. Reyes, it stars Angelu de Leon, Bobby Andrews and Onemig Bondoc. It premiered on June 2, 1997. The series concluded on February 12, 1999, with a total of 88 episodes.

== Cast and characters ==
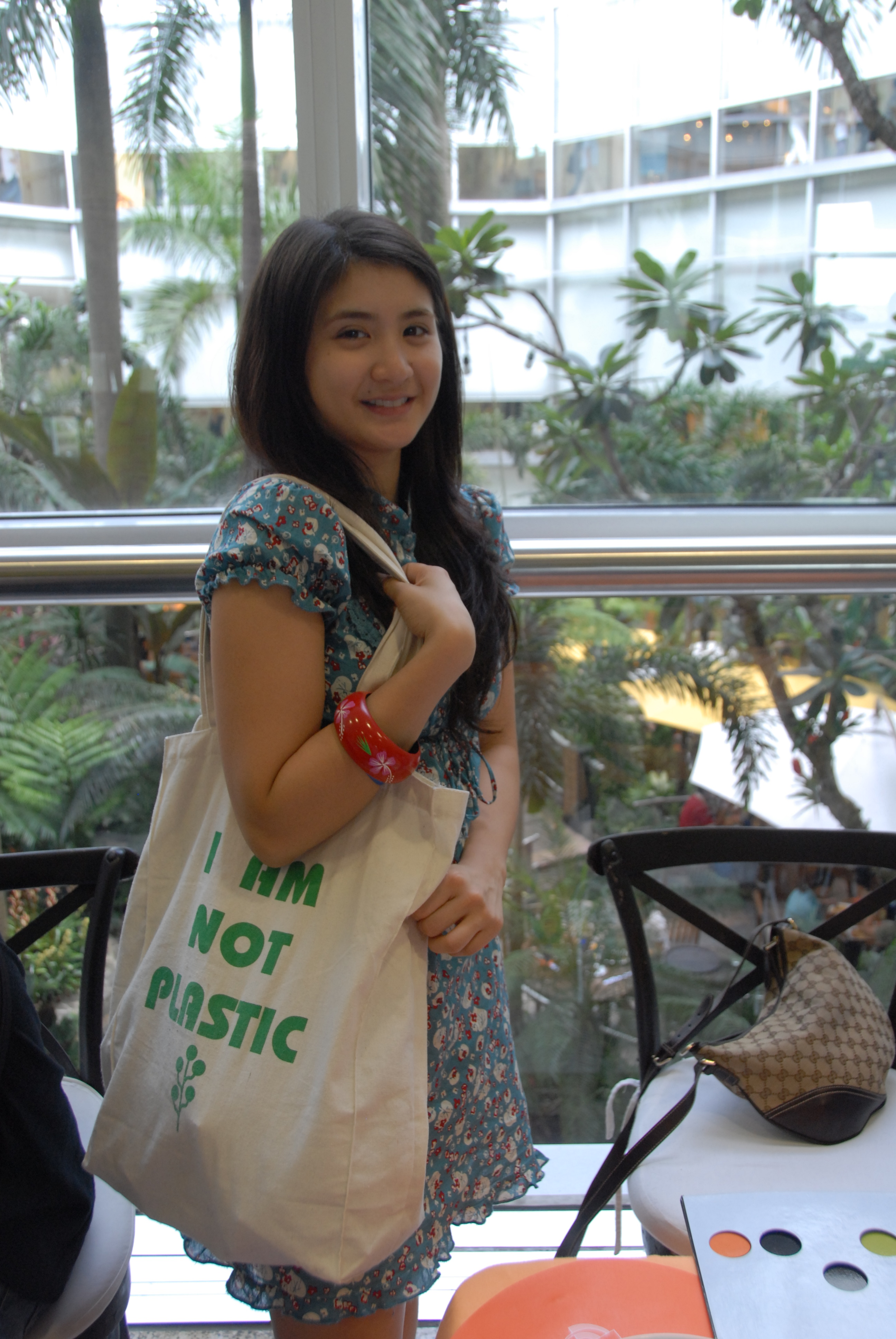
Rica Peralejo portrays Mitch Ferrer.

- Angelu de Leon as Ma. Patrice "Peachy" Real
- Bobby Andrews as Joaquin "Wacks" Torres III
- Onemig Bondoc as Jose Mari "JM" Rodriguez
- Red Sternberg as Francisco Martin "Kiko" Arboleda de Dios
- Michael Flores as Miguel "Mickey" Ledesma
- Donna Cruz as Stephanie Enriquez
- Jake Roxas as Noel Sta. Maria
- Raven Villanueva as Cristina "Cris" de Guzman
- Rica Peralejo as Michelle "Mitch" Ferrer
- Ciara Sotto as Regina "Rain" Abrera
- Mariel Lopez as Angel Buena
- Diego Castro III as Anton Villanueva
- Bernadette Allyson as Beatrice Santillan
- Ryan Eigenmann as Iñigo Escaler Torres
- Lindsay Custodio as Melissa Valenzuela
