= Jake Roxas =

Filipino actor

- Born: July 13, 1977 (age 48); Philippines
- Occupations: Actor, Model
- Years active: 1995–present
- Agents: GMA Artist Center (1995–2010); Star Magic (2010–2013)

Jake Roxas (born July 13, 1977) is a Filipino actor. He is mostly known for his role in Imortal as Magnus Imperial. He was a contract actor of ABS-CBN.

== Career ==
Roxas started his showbiz career in the GMA Network. He was a cast member of the teen-oriented show T.G.I.S. He took a rest out of showbiz for six years. In 2010, he came back to showbiz signed with the ABS-CBN network. He returned again to showbiz for FPJ's Ang Probinsyano in 2017.

== Filmography ==
=== Television ===
Year	Title	Role
1995–1999	T.G.I.S.	Noel Sta. Maria
1997–1999	Growing Up	Noel Sta. Maria
1997–2006	SOP	Himself/co-host
1998	Halik sa Apoy	Benj
1998–1999	Tropang Trumpo	Himself
1999	Di Ba't Ikaw	Berting
1999	Beh Bote Nga	Tom
2001	Idol Ko si Kap	Supporting Role
2002	Sana ay Ikaw na Nga	Guest Role
2006	Agawin Mo Man ang Lahat	Supporting Role
2010	Magkano ang Iyong Dangal?	Andrew Marquez
2010	Imortal	Magnus Imperial
2011	Maria la del Barrio	David Decasa
2011	Maalaala Mo Kaya: Make-Up	Edong
2012	Maalaala Mo Kaya: Tinapay	Tony
2012	Wansapanataym: Mitos' Touch	Special Guest
2013	Wansapanataym: Kilalang Kilala Ka Ba Niya?	Ishma
2013	Little Champ	Miguel Suarez
2013	Wansapanataym: Doggy, Daddy, Doggy	Mark Jr.
2017	FPJ's Ang Probinsyano	Daniel
2024	FPJ's Batang Quiapo	PMAJ Arnold Trillio

=== Films ===
- T.G.I.S.: The Movie (1997)
- Ikaw Na Sana (1998)
- Bulaklak ng Maynila (1999)
- Message Sent (2003)
- Xerex (2003)
- Walang Hanggang Paalam (2009)

== Awards ==
- Winner, Best New Television Personality For Ikaw Na Sana (GMA 7), 1997 PMPC Star Awards For TV
