= Bobby Andrews =

Filipino actor

- Born: Robert Riu Andrews; November 30, 1976 (age 49); Makati, Philippines
- Occupations: Actor, TV host
- Years active: 1995–present
- Agent: Viva Artists Agency (1995–present)
- Political party: Lakas
- Spouse: Bienne Co
- Children: 2

Robert Riu Andrews (born November 30, 1976) is a Filipino actor, TV host and former matinee idol. Starting out as a commercial model, he rose to fame when he teamed up with Angelu de Leon in the famous teen-oriented television show T.G.I.S. and its sequel Growing Up.

== Acting career ==
In 2009, Andrews appeared in the Philippine remake series of Zorro aired on GMA Network. He was part of the installment of Sine Novela called Kaya Kong Abutin ang Langit with Iza Calzado, Wendell Ramos and Angelika dela Cruz.

In 2010, he went back to ABS-CBN to become part of the Precious Hearts Romances Presents of Martha Cecila's Impostor. He was also seen in the hit primetime remake of Emil Cruz Jr.'s Mara Clara.

=== Television success ===
In the 1990s, Andrews gained fame with the hit GMA-7 and Viva television show T.G.I.S., a teen-and-youth-oriented show which pioneered teen television dramas in the Philippines. In 1997, he did the hit soap Ikaw Na Sana and ended with a movie with his co-star and then-screen partner Angelu de Leon.

In 1998, he became part of GMA soaps such as Ganyan Kita Kamahal and Halik sa Apoy. In 2002, he was part of the melodramatic soap Sana ay Ikaw na Nga. In 2004, he came to ABS-CBN to star in the now-defunct hit memorable first fantasy television drama Marina.

In 2005, he became part of GMA-7's first fantasy series Encantadia The First Season and 2006's Agawin Mo Man ang Lahat. In 2007, he came back to primetime as Ronald Santilian in the primetime series Walang Kapalit and 2008's, Lobo as a supporting role. In 2009, he was part of the Sine Novela afternoon soap Kaya Kong Abutin ang Langit. In 2010, he was in the afternoon hit soap Martha Cecila's Impostor which topped the afternoon line up and was mostly seen daily on the primetime remake of Emil Cruz Jr.'s Mara Clara as Amanthe Del Valle.

== Political career ==
Andrews entered into politics when he filed his candidacy for councilor in Quezon City's 4th district for the May 2022 polls under Lakas–CMD. He was included in the Malayang Quezon City coalition of Anakalusugan partylist representative Mike Defensor.

However, he failed to win a seat in the city council when he got the 8th place in the official count.

In 2023, Andrews filed his candidacy for the 2023 barangay and Sangguniang Kabataan Elections for Barangay Captain in Barangay Sacred Heart, Quezon City. Andrews lost once again after placing 2nd, losing to incumbent candidate, Camille Malig David.

== Personal life ==
Andrews is married to a Chinese woman named Bienne Co. They have two children.

== Filmography ==
=== Film ===
| Year | Title | Role |
|---|---|---|
| 1995 | Sabado Nights | Jerome |
| 1996 | Wanted: Perfect Mother | Arnel |
| 1996 | Takot Ka Ba sa Dilim? | Jude |
| 1997 | T.G.I.S. The Movie | Joaquin "Wacks" Torres III |
| 1997 | Laging Naroon Ka | Quinito |
| 1997 | Wala Na Bang Pag-ibig? | Eric |
| 1998 | Ikaw Na Sana: The Movie | Rafael Huico |
| 1998 | Ang Lahat ng Ito'y para sa 'Yo | Ariel |
| 1999 | Sumigaw Ka Hanggang Gusto Mo! | Louie |
| 1999 | Katawan | Andres |
| 2001 | Abakada... Ina | Jojo |
| 2001 | Buhay Kamao | |
| 2001 | Pangako... Ikaw Lang | Bert |
| 2001 | Susmaryosep! Four Fathers | Fr. Ep |
| 2002 | Mga Batang Lansangan Ngayon | |
| 2002 | Mahal Kita, Final Answer | Kenneth |
| 2003 | Sukdulan | Roy |
| 2004 | Annie B. | Alberto |
| 2004 | Masikip sa Dibdib: The Boobita Rose Story | |
| 2004 | Volta | Oh-Vlading |
| 2004 | Lastikman: Unang Banat | Adan |
| 2006 | Kapag Tumibok ang Puso: Not Once, But Twice | Johnny Tor |
| 2006 | Reyna | Dino |
| 2007 | A Love Story | Roy |
| 2007 | Resiklo | Dos |
| 2008 | For the First Time | Mike Villaraza |
| 2008 | Magkaibigan | Lito |
| 2010 | You to Me Are Everything | Atty. Ronnie Domingo |
| 2010 | Vox Populi | |
| 2011 | In the Name of Love | Neil |
| 2011 | Tween Academy: Class of 2012 | Robin's father |
| 2011 | My House Husband: Ikaw Na! | Ariel |
| 2013 | Ano ang Kulay ng Mga Nakalimutang Pangarap? | |
| 2013 | Girl, Boy, Bakla, Tomboy | Jack |
| 2014 | Talk Back and You're Dead | Teddy Pendleton |
| 2015 | Felix Manalo | Apolinario "Inar" Ramos |
| 2017 | Deadma Walking | Doctor |
| 2018 | Kasal | Alfie |
| 2020 | Suarez: The Healing Priest | |

=== Television ===
| Year | Title | Role |
|---|---|---|
| 1995 | T.G.I.S. | Joaquin "Wacks" Torres III |
| 1996 | Tierra Sangre | Cesar Sangre |
| 1997 | Growing Up | Joaquin Torres III |
| 1997 | Ikaw na Sana | Rafael Huico |
| 1998 | Ganyan Kita Kamahal | Henry Cortez |
| 1998 | GMA Love Stories | Various |
| 1998–1999 | Halik sa Apoy | Enrico |
| 1998–1999 | Takot Ka Ba Sa Dilim? | Jude |
| 2000–2001 | Subic Bay | |
| 2000–2002 | Kagat ng Dilim | Nathan |
| 2002–2003 | Sana ay Ikaw na Nga | Vladimir Gaston |
| 2002 | Magandang Morning Philippines | Himself / Host |
| 2004 | Marina | Raphael Sandico |
| 2005 | Encantadia | Asval |
| 2006 | Agawin Mo Man ang Lahat | Gonzalo Valverde |
| 2007 | Walang Kapalit | Ronald Santillian |
| 2007 | Super Inggo 1.5: Ang Bagong Bangis | Binatang X |
| 2008 | Lobo | Emilio "Emil" Ortega |
| 2008 | Codename: Asero | Jupiter |
| 2008 | Obra | Maloy |
| 2009 | Pare Koy | Paul |
| 2009 | Zorro | Sergeant Pedro Gonzales |
| 2009–2010 | Sine Novela: Kaya Kong Abutin ang Langit | Nick Arnaldo |
| 2010 | Claudine Presents: Stage Mother | Various |
| 2010 | Precious Hearts Romances Presents: Impostor | Leo Serrano |
| 2010–2011 | Mara Clara | Amanthe Del Valle |
| 2011 | Rod Santiago's The Sisters | Young Enrique Zialcita |
| 2011 | Wansapanataym: Sabay-Sabay Pasaway | Dr. Ferrer |
| 2011–2012 | Munting Heredera | Stanley Lobregat |
| 2012 | Wansapanataym: Dollhouse | Nestor |
| 2012 | Maalaala Mo Kaya: Panyo | |
| 2012 | Kasalanan Bang Ibigin Ka? | Neil |
| 2012–2013 | Teen Gen | Joaquin Torres III |
| 2013 | Indio | Young Hernando |
| 2013 | Love and Lies | Jose Lorde Villamor |
| 2013 | One Day Isang Araw | Jun |
| 2013 | Got to Believe | Rodolfo San Juan |
| 2015 | Pablo S. Gomez's Inday Bote | Angelo Delgado |
| 2015–2016 | Buena Familia | Arthur Buena |
| 2016–2017 | The Greatest Love | Alvin Sales |
| 2017 | A Love to Last | Himself / Guest |
| 2017 | Wansapanataym: My Hair Lady | Marcus Agustin |
| 2017 | Mulawin vs. Ravena | Antonio |
| 2017 | Road Trip | Himself / Guest |
| 2017 | Wildflower | Mateo Ruiz |
| 2018 | FPJ's Ang Probinsyano | Special Assistant to the President William Celerio |
| 2018 | Ipaglaban Mo: Titser | Peter Roces |
| 2018 | Ipaglaban Mo: Bastardo | Rommel Aguilar |
| 2018 | Magpakailanman: Top of the Clash | Joseph |
| 2019 | Halik | Manuel Vegafria |
| 2019 | Ipaglaban Mo: Malasakit | Bobby |
| 2020 | Pamilya Ko | Carlitos Quisumbing |
| 2020 | Descendants of the Sun | Eric Chavez |
| 2020 | Bawal na Game Show | Himself / Contestant |
| 2020 | Stay-In Love | Chris Ortega |
| 2021 | Paano ang Pangako? | Richard Dominante-Cruz |
| 2021 | Di Na Muli | Alfred |
| 2022 | Maria Clara at Ibarra | Anton Villarama |
| 2022 | Tadhana: Isabella | Crisanto |
| 2022 | Suntok sa Buwan | Benj |
| 2023 | Luv is: Caught in His Arms | Lorenzo Almero |
| 2023 | Stolen Life | Julian Hidalgo |
| 2024–2025 | Lilet Matias: Attorney-at-Law | Ramir Engano |
| 2025 | Para sa Isa't Isa | George Revina |
| 2025 | Rainbow Rumble | Himself / Contestant |
| 2025 | Hating Kapatid | Chito Alarcon |
| 2026 | Paskong Pinoy: The Last New Year in Boracay | |
