= Onemig Bondoc =

Filipino actor-politician

- Born: Juan Miguel Rivera Bondoc; May 12, 1977 (age 49); Manila, Philippines
- Education: La Salle Greenhills; CAP College Foundation
- Occupations: Actor, commercial model
- Years active: 1992–present
- Agent: Star Magic (1999–2004; 2010–2014); Viva Artists Agency (1995–present)
- Children: Armelle Bariou Bondoc

Juan Miguel Rivera Bondoc (born May 12, 1977), professionally known as Onemig Bondoc, is a Filipino actor and television host. He was known for his roles in shows like T.G.I.S. and its spin-off Growing Up shown on GMA Network. He later became an ABS-CBN talent, seen on several films and television series of the network, including Ngayong Nandito Ka with Kristine Hermosa and Jericho Rosales.

== Personal life ==
Bondoc was born to businessman Mariano Bondoc Jr. and Milo Rivera. He is the eldest of four.

Bondoc spent most of his high school and grade school at La Salle Greenhills. He left the country and finished high school at Port Alberni, British Columbia, Canada.

He was engaged to Aiko Melendez in October 2026.

== Career ==
=== Commercial model ===
Bondoc was discovered at age 13 by Louie Aguinaldo, who became his manager. He made his mark as the youngest lead ever in the popular Close-Up toothpaste advertising campaign by the time he was 14 years old. By the time he entered showbiz, he has done over seventeen TV commercials and print ads for some of the most respectable brands in the market including Jollibee, Ivory Shampoo, Eveready, Del Monte 202, Mister Donut, Ayala Center and Oishi.

=== The TGIS years ===
Onemig entered showbiz in 1995 and was a mainstay in Viva and GMA Network co-produced shows like Villa Quintana and Ober Da Bakod. However, he only became well known when he joined the teen series T.G.I.S. (Thank God It's Sabado).

He was signed to a nine-picture contract by Viva Films at age 17. His first movie in 1996 with his co-stars from TGIS, Takot Ka Ba sa Dilim? (Are You Afraid of the Dark?), was a breakthrough success. This was followed up with hit films like Where D' Girls R, TGIS the Movie and Silaw, all of which were done from 1996 to 1997.

On television, Onemig became a regular host of the popular noontime show Eat Bulaga! before graduating from TGIS in 1997 and later moved on to roles in shows like Growing Up (spin-off of T.G.I.S.), Ganyan Kita Kamahal (That's How Much I Love You) and Tropang Trumpo in 1997–98. He was able to work with his idols Aga Muhlach and Mikee Cojuangco in the film Dahil Ba Sa Kanya (Is It Because of Her?). He was launched as a romantic leading man in Viva Films' I'm Sorry My Love opposite Judy Ann Santos in 1998. He also played a young man who witnessed student murders in the suspense film Sumigaw Ka Hanggang Gusto Mo (Shout While You Can) in 1999. He did his last film with Viva, My Pledge of Love, again with Judy Ann Santos before moving to ABS-CBN.

=== At ABS-CBN ===
Bondoc signed a five-year contract with the network and had his career managed by ABS-CBN Talent Center (now known as Star Magic). His first TV assignment with ABS-CBN was a one-month episode in the now-defunct drama anthology Star Drama Theatre. He played roles in the show ranging from light to heavy ones. Soon after, he became a regular fixture in the Sunday noontime variety show ASAP and appeared in the light dramedy Labs Ko Si Babe opposite Jolina Magdangal and Marvin Agustin. Though he was busy with television, he was not able to do movies for almost a year since he still had a movie contract with former mother studio Viva Films. At that time he severed ties with Viva and, as a result, he had to wait till his Viva movie contract expired.

Bondoc made a movie comeback in 2000 in the horror trilogy Tabi-Tabi Po of FLT Films where he was paired with another former Viva talent Antoinette Taus; the movie suffered low sales at the box office. However, he made it up by finally making a box-office success movie called Trip with ABS-CBN's movie outfit Star Cinema in 2001. He was quickly given a follow-up movie in 2002, Jologs, which was also a successful hit. He did other projects like Attagirl and Pangako Sa 'Yo while working on Jologs. In 2003, Bondoc played the closet gay Wilson in the youth-oriented series Buttercup. His last TV series appearance was in 2004 on ABS-CBN's fantaserye Marina. That same year, he starred with the loveteam of Jericho Rosales and Kristine Hermosa in Ngayong Nandito Ka.

=== At IBC-13 ===
Bondoc signed a two-year contract with the network of IBC 13. In 2005 his final television show called Chowtime Na! showed in 2005 to 2006.

== Advocacy ==
In 2001, Bondoc was named as official spokesperson for youth and students by the National Youth Commission and Center for Students and Co-Curricular Affairs of the Department of Education.

== Businesses ==
During his stay in showbiz, Bondoc became an investor in his family's businesses. Among his businesses was the Benedictine International School of Quezon City.

=== Politics ===
In 2013, Bondoc ran for representative at the 2nd district of Bataan under Aksyon Demokratiko. Bondoc withdrew his candidacy before the election.

== Filmography ==
=== Film ===
- Takot Ka Ba sa Dilim (Viva) - 1996
- Where the Girls Are (Viva) - 1996
- T.G.I.S.: The Movie (Viva) - 1997
- Silaw (Viva) - 1998
- Dahil Ba sa Kanya (Viva) - 1998
- I'm Sorry My Love (Viva) - 1998
- Sumigaw Ka Hanggang Gusto Mo (Viva) - 1999
- My Pledge of Love (Viva) - 1999
- Tabi-Tabi Po (FLT) - 2000
- Trip as Louie (Star Cinema) - 2001
- Jologs as Trigger (Star Cinema) - 2002
- Message Sent (FLT) - 2003
- Ngayong Nandito Ka as Derek Cervantes (Star Cinema) - 2003
- Pinay Pie as Elmo (Star Cinema) - 2003
- Volta as Oh-Blah-Blah (Star Cinema) - 2004
- Nang Humupa ang Ingay as himself (short film)- 2026

=== Television ===
- Young Love, Sweet Love (RPN) 1992–1993
- Maalaala Mo Kaya (ABS-CBN) 1993–2005
- Villa Quintana as Alfon (GMA Network) 1994–1997
- T.G.I.S. as Jomai/JM Rodriguez (GMA Network) 1995–1999
- Ober Da Bakod as Bubwit (GMA Network) 1995–1996
- Eat Bulaga! (GMA Network) 1997
- Growing Up Jomai/JM Rodriguez (GMA Network) 1997–1999
- Tropang Trumpo (ABC) 1998
- Ganyan Kita Kamahal (GMA Network) 1998
- ASAP (ABS-CBN) 1999–2005
- Star Drama Theatre (ABS-CBN) 1999
- Labs Ko Si Babe (ABS-CBN) 1999
- Star Drama Presents: Burn (ABS-CBN) 2000
- !Oka Tokat (ABS-CBN) 2001
- Attagirl (ABS-CBN) 2001
- Pangako Sa 'Yo as Errol (ABS-CBN) 2002
- Tabing Ilog as Toby (ABS-CBN) 2002
- Buttercup as Wilson Go (ABS-CBN) 2003
- Marina as Binggoy (ABS-CBN) 2004
- Chowtime Na! (IBC) 2005–2006
- Tunay na Buhay (GMA Network) 2014
- Sabado Badoo (GMA Network) 2015 - cameo footage
