= Ciara Sotto =

Filipina actress and singer

- Born: Ciara Anna Gamboa Sotto; 1980 (age 45–46); Makati, Philippines
- Occupations: Actress; singer; host
- Years active: 1992–present
- Agents: APT Entertainment (V Management Group); Sparkle GMA Artist Center; MQuest Ventures and Star Worx
- Spouse: Jojo Oconer (m. 2010; ann. 2019)
- Children: 1
- Parent: Vicente Sotto III (father); Helen Gamboa (mother)
- Relatives: Gian Sotto (brother); Lala Sotto (sister); Vic Sotto (uncle); Pauleen Luna (aunt-in-law); Val Sotto (uncle); Oyo Boy Sotto (cousin); Sharon Cuneta (cousin); KC Concepcion (niece); Kakie (niece); Vico Sotto (cousin)

Ciara Anna Gamboa Sotto (Tagalog: [ˈʃaɾa ˈsɔtɔ] SHA-ra so-to; born 1980), is a Filipino actress singer and host.

== Career ==
At age six, Sotto made her first appearance on the noontime variety show Eat Bulaga!. She began her television career in T.G.I.S. before becoming a recurring co-host on Eat Bulaga!. As a teenager, she regularly performed on the show with her cousin Danica Sotto and Jocas de Leon; they were dubbed the "Ang TVJ (Tito, Vic, and Joey) Kids." During her stint, she was paired with co-host Paolo Ballesteros as the "CiaPao" tandem. She later appeared in several television programs aired by GMA Network.

In 2008, Sotto launched her album entitled If You Love Me. She said that she was involved in different aspects of the album's production. The album contains songs written by her father, Tito, with her uncle, Vic Sotto along with Joey de Leon doing the back-up vocals of one song. It was Sotto's second album and it is produced and was distributed by Sony BMG Music.

== Personal life ==
She is the youngest daughter of actress Helen Gamboa-Sotto and actor and Senator Vicente Sotto III. She is a first cousin of Sharon Cuneta (their mothers are sisters) and an aunt to KC Concepcion. She is also cousins with Oyo Boy Sotto, as well as Pasig Mayor Vico Sotto.

In 2010, Sotto married businessman Jojo Oconer, with whom she has a son. Their marriage was annulled in 2019, after which she briefly dated for 2 years but has since remained single.

== Filmography ==
=== Film ===
| Year | Title | Role |
|---|---|---|
| 1985 | Mama Said Papa Said I Love You | Ciara |
| 1997 | T.G.I.S.: The Movie | Rain Abrera |
| 1999 | Sumigaw Ka Hanggang Gusto Mo | Jessie |
| 2000 | Di Ko Kayang Tanggapin | Sheryl |
| 2000 | Minsan, Minahal Kita | Mary Ann |
| 2004 | Spirit of the Glass | Cecille |
| 2006 | Enteng Kabisote 3: Okay Ka, Fairy Ko: The Legend Goes On and On and On | Sha |
| 2009 | Mano Po 6: A Mother's Love | Carol Uy |
| 2010 | White House | Angelique |
| 2011 | Enteng Ng Ina Mo | Trainors |
| 2014 | Where I Am King | Battered girlfriend |

=== Television ===
| Year | Title | Role | Note(s) |
|---|---|---|---|
| 1995–1999 | T.G.I.S. | Regina "Rain" Abrera | |
| 1997–1999 | Growing Up | Regina "Rain" Abrera | |
| 1998–present | Eat Bulaga! | Herself (co-host, recurring guest performer) | |
| 1998 | Halik sa Apoy | Adelle | |
| 1999 | Di Ba't Ikaw | Grace | |
| 2001 | Sa Dulo ng Walang Hanggan | Barbara Wilwayco | |
| 2003 | Buttercup | Sheryl Bala | |
| 2004 | Magpakailanman | Herself (various episode roles) | Episode role |
| 2005–2006 | Love to Love | Princess | Episode: "Love-an O Bawi" |
| 2005–2006 | Love to Love | Samantha / Sam | Episode: "Best Friends" |
| 2006 | Dangal | Celestina "Celestine" Soledad | |
| 2009 | Darna | Selena / Babaeng Apoy | |
| 2010 | Talentadong Pinoy | Celebrity Talentado Champion | |
| 2011 | Star Confessions | Sfazhiva | |
| 2012 | Valiente | young Luming | |
| 2012 | Walang Hanggan | young Margaret Montenegro | |
| 2012 | Wansapanataym | Janine | Episode: "Magic Shoes" |
| 2013–2014 | Madam Chairman | Jingle | |
| 2015 | Princess in the Palace | Daphne Jacinto | |
| 2016 | Tonight with Arnold Clavio | Herself | |
| 2016 | Yan ang Morning! | Herself | |
| 2018 | Contessa | Verlina Venganza | |
| 2022–2025 | M.O.M.S — Mhies on a Mission | Herself (host) | |
| 2024–2025 | Ang Himala ni Niño | Andrea | |
| 2025 | Rainbow Rumble | Herself (contestant) | Season 2; Episode 23 |
