= Red Sternberg =

Filipino actor (1974–2025)

- Born: Rodwick Carlin Fong Sternberg; May 30, 1974; Philippines
- Died: May 27, 2025 (aged 50); United States
- Occupation: Actor
- Years active: 1990–2004
- Children: 3

Rodwick Carlin "Red" Fong Sternberg (May 30, 1974 – May 27, 2025) was a Filipino–German actor in film and television shows in the Philippines.

== Education ==
Sternberg took up computer science at Adamson University in Manila.

== Career ==
Sternberg began his career a model in 1990, appearing in television commercials and print ads. He entered showbiz in 1995 when he was cast in the popular youth-oriented show of GMA-7 entitled T.G.I.S.. He portrayed the role of Francisco Martin "Kiko" Arboleda de Dios in over 200 episodes and in the 1997 spin-off film T.G.I.S.: The Movie. His success in that role led to him starring in his own film It's Cool Bulol. That same year, he appeared in the thriller Silaw. In 1999, he starred in My Pledge Of Love, which performed below expectations in the box office.

Sternberg then retired from acting in the early 2000s, with his final television series appearance being in 2002 in the drama series Sana ay Ikaw na Nga. He took up various jobs before moving to the United States, where he became a hotel manager. In 2004, he briefly returned to the Philippines to run for councilor of Pasay's second district. He was endorsed by presidential candidate Fernando Poe Jr. while running under the same political party of Laban ng Demokratikong Pilipino (LDP). He lost the elections.

== Personal life and death ==
Sternberg was in a brief relationship with T.G.I.S. co-actor Rica Peralejo, then with T.G.I.S. co-actor Kim delos Santos. He later married Sandy in December 2005 and had three children. Sternberg died of a heart attack in the United States, on May 27, 2025, three days before his 51st birthday.

== Filmography ==
=== Film ===
- The Jessica Alfaro Story (1995)
- Where 'D' Girls 'R' (1996)
- Are You Afraid of the Dark? (1996)
- T.G.I.S.: The Movie (1997)
- Laging Naroon Ka (1997)
- Silaw (1998)
- It's Cool Bulol (1998)
- Sumigaw Ka Hanggang Gusto Mo (1999)
- My Pledge Of Love (1999)

=== Television ===
- T.G.I.S. (1995–1997)
- Ober da Bakod (1996)
- Growing Up (1997–1999)
- Campus Romance: Angelika's Fallen (1998)
- Mikee Forever (1999)
- Anna Karenina (1999–2000)
- Sana ay Ikaw na Nga (2001–2003)
