= Aguinaldo (disambiguation) =

Aguinaldo is a thirteenth salary paid to workers in Latin American countries during the Christmas season.

Aguinaldo may also refer to:

- Aguinaldo (music), a folk genre of Christmas music found in Latin America
- Aguinaldo (name), a surname and given name
- Aguinaldo, Ifugao, a municipality in the Philippines
- Aguinaldo Highway, a primary and secondary highway in Cavite, Philippines
- Emilio Aguinaldo, a Filipino revolutionary leader.
- General Emilio Aguinaldo, Cavite, a municipality in the Philippines
- The Aguinaldos, a mother-and-son content creator duo
