= Kapamilya, Deal or No Deal =

Philippine game show

- 2026 title card
- Genre: Game show
- Created by: ABS-CBN Corporation (Note: Credits as per the show's closing credits.); Dick de Rijk; John de Mol
- Written by: Chris Violago; Cecille Matutina; TP Adanza; Alex Balite; Waldo Mariano Bautista; Mark Joseph Buenafe; Rochelle Veron; Aol Rivera
- Directed by: Bobet Vidanes (2006–16); John Prats (2026–present); Joane Laygo (2026–present)
- Creative directors: Willy Cuevas; Bobet Vidanes; TP Adanza; Luis Manzano
- Presented by: Kris Aquino; Luis Manzano
- Starring: The Banker; 26K; 24K; 20 Lucky Stars
- Theme music composer: Martijn Schimmer
- Opening theme: "Deal or No Deal"
- Country of origin: Philippines
- Original languages: Filipino (primary); English (secondary)
- No. of seasons: 6
- No. of episodes: 912

Production
- Executive producers: Eugenio Lopez III (2006–09, 2012–13); Morly Stewart Nueva (2006–09); Paeancyd Pearl B. Sabangan (2012–13, 2015–16); Charo Santos-Concio (2013–16); Carlo L. Katigbak (2016, 2026–present); Cory V. Vidanes; Laurenti M. Dyogi; Luis L. Andrada
- Producer: Olivia M. Zarate
- Editor: Ariel Diaz
- Camera setup: Multi-camera
- Running time: 45–60 minutes
- Production companies: ABS-CBN Studios; Endemol Asia (2006–2016); Banijay Philippines (along with Banijay Rights 2026–present)

Original release
- Network: ABS-CBN
- Release: June 5, 2006 – March 4, 2016
- Network: Kapamilya Channel (Note: Through its ABS-CBN licensing, it also airs on All TV as well as other affiliate blocktime channels and online platforms via Kapamilya Online Live through Facebook and YouTube. It is also available on-demand via iWant and internationally via The Filipino Channel.)
- Release: April 25, 2026 – present

Kapamilya, Deal or No Deal is a Philippine television game show broadcast by ABS-CBN, Kapamilya Channel, A2Z, All TV and TV5, based on the Netherlands game show Miljoenenjacht, which is first hosted by Kris Aquino. The series first premiered on June 5, 2006, and aired on weekdays. The first series aired for three seasons until March 27, 2009. After a three-year hiatus, the show returned for a fourth season premiering on February 25, 2012, with Luis Manzano taking over the hosting duties, and continued for one more season until 2016. In July 2025, ABS-CBN announced that the show would be revived after a decade-long hiatus with Manzano reprising his hosting duties. Its sixth season premiered on April 25, 2026.

== History ==
Title card used from 2006 to 2016

The hosts of Kapamilya, Deal or No Deal

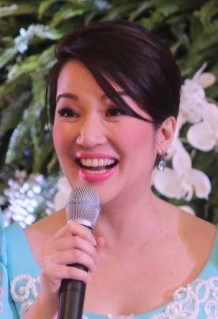
Kris Aquino

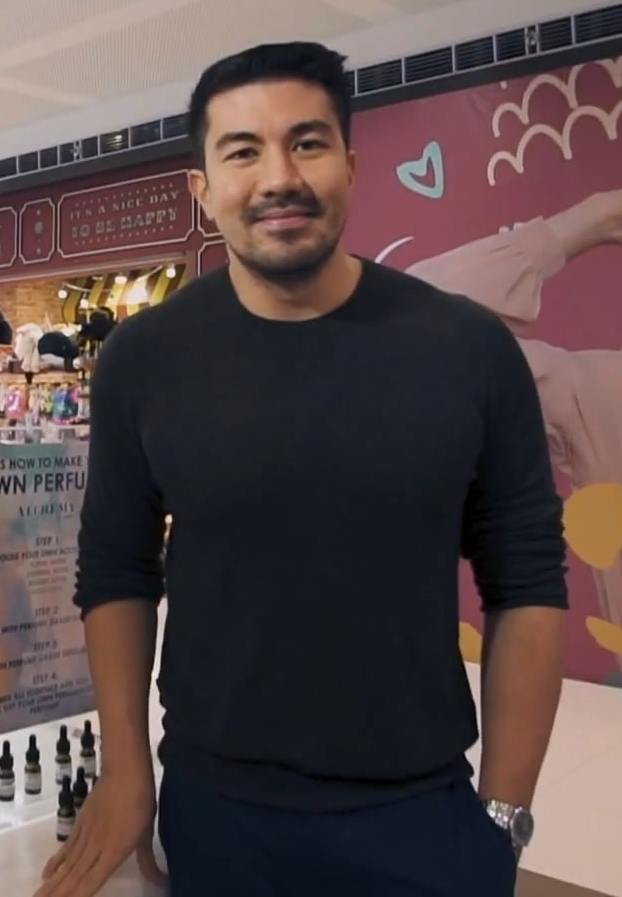
Luis Manzano

Kapamilya, Deal or No Deal first premiered on June 5, 2006, at 8:00 PM PHT (UTC + 8) as lead-out programming after TV Patrol World, with Kris Aquino as its hostess.

Kapamilya, Deal or No Deal originally planned for the show to be aired for three months to give way to Pinoy Dream Academy - another Endemol-produced program, but immense popularity resulted in the show being extended by another six months before concluding with 190 episodes on February 23, 2007.

The second season premiered on June 11, 2007, and was supposed to end on September 21 the same year. Once again, its success amongst viewers resulted in an extended season and was moved to the lead-in timeslot (5:45 PM PHT) before TV Patrol World on September 24; the second season concluded with 155 episodes on January 11, 2008. After a six-month hiatus, the third season premiered on July 28, 2008, and became the first one to be broadcast on TFC's North American feed before concluding on March 27, 2009.

The fourth season premiered on February 25, 2012 after a three-year hiatus, and Luis Manzano took over Aquino as the host due to her commitments with Kris TV and taping conflicts with Kailangan Ko'y Ikaw. Considered as a continuation of the original series, the fourth season lasted until September 28, 2013, and had noticeable changes in gameplay while airing only on Saturdays as would be the case for succeeding years, serving as lead-out program to TV Patrol Weekend.

The fifth season premiered on February 9, 2015, after numerous teasers hinting of its return. The fifth season saw noticeable changes such as the reduced grand prize and number of cases; for the first time in the series, neither civilian contestants nor the 26K models were involved in the show, but celebrities (dubbed "Lucky Stars") acted as both case holders and contestants for the show. Season five concluded with on-location filming for the first time in the series, dubbed Barangay Edition, which held weekly episodes between January 25 and March 4, 2016.

ABS-CBN launched an official YouTube channel for Kapamilya Deal or No Deal in September 2024, with each episode from the majority of its fifth season (including some episodes from the preceding 4th and Barangay Edition) being uploaded daily from September 30 of that year until January 30, 2026, a manner similar to the American's Deal or No Deal channel and its YouTube counterpart channel Deal or No Deal Universe. These episodes were uploaded on Facebook and coincided with terrestrial TV reruns on All TV and A2Z.

On July 29, 2025, omnibus teasers from ABS-CBN revealed that the game show would return for a sixth season after years of absence with Manzano reprising his role as host and additional duties as creative consultant. The sixth season eventually premiered on April 25, 2026. On July 4, 2026, the game show expanded its airing to TV5.

== Overview ==
Season	Episodes	Originally aired		Presenter
Season	Episodes	First released	Last released	Presenter
1	190	June 5, 2006	February 23, 2007	Kris Aquino
2	155	June 11, 2007	January 11, 2008	Kris Aquino
3	175	July 28, 2008	March 27, 2009	Kris Aquino
4	82	February 25, 2012	September 28, 2013	Luis Manzano
5	277 (Note: The first 247 episodes were regular episodes which aired until January 22, 2016. The Barangay Edition, which began from January 25, 2016, aired for 30 remaining episodes.)	February 9, 2015	March 4, 2016	Luis Manzano
6	44 (Note: As of November 15, 2026; tally excluding 16 re-run episodes.)	April 25, 2026	ongoing	Luis Manzano

== Gameplay ==
This version is very similar to the U.S. version of Deal or No Deal (including the logo), except for the sounds and musical scoring, which were adapted from the original Dutch version.

Before each game, a third-party independent adjudicator, who is the only person to know the value inside each case, randomly places such values in the 20 briefcases (previously 26 for the first three seasons, and 24 in Season four), each handled by dressed models in Seasons 1-4 (called the 26K/24K) or potential contestants since Season 5 (called Lucky Stars). Each case contains some amount of money, ranging between ₱1 and ₱1 million. The top prize was previously ₱2 million in most episodes prior to season five, was ₱3 million in most of Season two, and ₱4 million in some episodes of Seasons one and three. (Note: During the Christmas episodes from season 3, the top prize was set to ₱1 million with five briefcases holding that amount, similar to the "Million Dollar Mission" in the American counterpart; the five briefcases containing ₱1 million was likely a reference on the setup for that American's first millionaire Jessica Robinson, which have occurred two months earlier. However, the automatic top prize win, which occurred for the other millionaire Winnow "Tomorrow" Rodriquez (where she won the million with three of 10 briefcases remaining on the board), did not repeat in the Filipino version.)

After picking a case, the contestant selects among the remaining cases to be revealed one at a time. The game is divided into rounds; the first round has the contestant select 5 cases (6 in Seasons 1-3), with successive rounds generally having the contestant select fewer cases than the previous.

After each round, a "phone call" will be made by "The Banker", a mysterious figure whose face is not shown (at times a silhouette can be seen). He purportedly sits in a skybox (situated between the two audience sections) and makes an offer via telephone to the host (his voice is never heard) to buy the contestant's case, loosely based on the mean of the cash amounts still in play, and also based on the contestant's psychology. The contestant is shown a button that is revealed underneath a Plexiglas lid. The contestant is then asked by the host the title question: "Deal or No Deal?"

When asked the question, the contestant must either press the button to accept the Banker's offer (Deal) or shut the lid to refuse it (No Deal). If the contestant accepts the Deal, the game ends, and they win whatever the Banker offered. Contestant who accept the Deal are often given the chance to play out the game entirely at no risk to them to see if they had made the right choice in accepting. Hypothetical offers are also displayed to see if they could have won a better deal from the Banker or if their offer was the best. On the other hand, if the contestant refuses the Deal, they proceed to the next round, selecting other cases to reveal. The Banker's succeeding offers may be higher or lower than the previous offer depending on the round's gameplay (i.e., the offer generally increases when smaller amounts are revealed, and vice versa). If the contestant says "No Deal" to every offer the Banker makes, they win whatever is in their briefcase. There are some episodes that when the contestant declined the final offer, he/she will given a chance to swap his/her case to the remaining case if she thinks that the other case has higher amount than to his case. As in other game shows, any prize money won by the celebrity (and specifically from the fifth season onwards) is equally divided between them and their charity of their choice. In most of season four and in the Barangay editions, some briefcases also added a bonus prize which is awarded to the contestant, plus the amount won during the game.

Contestants who joined through text messaging are selected and screened with a series of interviews and tests, including a psychological one, before they appear on the show. Each contestant has several supporters (usually three or four) who sit in a special section just off stage during his/her game. As the field of briefcases dwindles, one or more of the supporters are asked to consult with the contestant and help them make a decision. These exchanges have become emotional, particularly when very high and very small amounts remain, and the Banker offers a large cash buyout. The contestant's supporters are typically revealed after the second Bank deal and before the third round; although if a contestant is doing well, the host will let the game run its course for some time, often only consulting the supporters when the tide begins to turn.

== Case values ==
The currency of the amounts on the money board, on the briefcases, and offered by the Banker to the contestants is in Philippine pesos. Throughout the show, the peso sign is neither used in all of the amounts on the money board or on the briefcases, nor offers by the Banker to the contestants due to existing limitations in font and character support in computer graphics for the actual peso sign (₱). But on the sixth season, the peso sign was used for the recap of Banker's Previous Offer which shown on the left side of the screen. Throughout the series, the smallest prize has always been ₱1, but the values and the board's grand prize has always varied.

=== Kris Aquino era ===
Seasons 1 & 3		4 Million Edition (Seasons 1 & 3)		Season 2		Christmas Edition (Season 3)	
₱1	₱1,000	₱1	₱1,000	₱1	₱1,000	₱1	₱1,000
₱5	₱2,500	₱5	₱10,000	₱5	₱2,500	₱5	₱2,500
₱10	₱5,000	₱10	₱25,000	₱10	₱5,000	₱10	₱5,000
₱25	₱10,000	₱25	₱50,000	₱25	₱10,000	₱25	₱10,000
₱50	₱25,000	₱50	₱75,000	₱50	₱25,000	₱50	₱25,000
₱75	₱50,000	₱75	₱100,000	₱75	₱50,000	₱75	₱50,000
₱100	₱100,000	₱100	₱200,000	₱100	₱75,000	₱100	₱100,000
₱150	₱200,000	₱150	₱300,000	₱150	₱100,000	₱150	₱200,000
₱200	₱300,000	₱200	₱400,000	₱200	₱250,000	₱200	₱1,000,000
₱300	₱400,000	₱300	₱500,000	₱250	₱500,000	₱300	₱1,000,000
₱400	₱500,000	₱400	₱1,000,000	₱300	₱1,000,000	₱400	₱1,000,000
₱500	₱1,000,000	₱500	₱2,000,000	₱400	₱2,000,000	₱500	₱1,000,000
₱750	₱2,000,000	₱750	₱4,000,000	₱500	₱3,000,000	₱750	₱1,000,000

=== Luis Manzano era ===
Season 4		Christmas Edition (Season 4)		Anniversary Special (Season 4)		Season 5		Season 6	
₱1	₱1,000	₱1	₱10,000	₱1	₱5,000	₱1	₱1,000	₱1	₱1,000
₱5	₱5,000	₱5	₱25,000	₱5	₱10,000	₱5	₱5,000	₱5	₱5,000
₱10	₱10,000	₱10	₱50,000	₱10	₱25,000	₱10	₱10,000	₱10	₱10,000
₱25	₱25,000	₱25	₱100,000	₱25	₱50,000	₱25	₱50,000	₱25	₱50,000
₱50	₱50,000	₱50	₱200,000	₱50	₱100,000	₱50	₱100,000	₱50	₱100,000
₱75	₱100,000	₱75	₱300,000	₱75	₱200,000	₱100	₱200,000	₱100	₱125,000
₱100	₱200,000	₱100	₱300,000	₱100	₱300,000	₱200	₱300,000	₱200	₱150,000
₱200	₱300,000	₱200	₱300,000	₱200	₱400,000	₱300	₱400,000	₱300	₱250,000
₱300	₱400,000	₱300	₱400,000	₱300	₱500,000	₱400	₱500,000	₱400	₱500,000
₱400	₱500,000	₱500	₱500,000	₱400	₱1,000,000	₱500	₱1,000,000	₱500	₱1,000,000
₱500	₱1,000,000	₱1,000	₱1,000,000	₱500	₱1,000,000				
₱750	₱2,000,000	₱5,000	₱2,000,000	₱1,000	₱2,000,000				

== Models ==
=== Kris Aquino's 26K ===
Kapamilya, Deal or No Deal's first three seasons featured the 26K. Unlike their American counterparts, the ladies were not assigned to fixed positions and so could handle any briefcase number during the game. This was determined before broadcast or taping by a drawing of lots backstage.

Charmel de Asis, who gained attention and celebrity status for frequently handling briefcases with the highest amounts in the game, which became a running gag during games. Musical scoring from horror films such as "The Murder" from the Alfred Hitchcock-directed 1960 film Psycho would be often played before Aquino commanded her to open a briefcase.

Most notable models from the show include Chloe Dauden, who would win 2nd Princess in the 2011 Miss World Philippines, Naomi Peña, (a well-known food and mukbang vlogger), Jeck Maierhofer, Wendy Valdez, Diana Qeblawi, Toni Alyessa Hipolito, Dang Palma, Bernice Tan, and Ferleene Noguera, among others.

=== Luis Manzano's 24K and Lucky Stars ===
In the fourth season, the show featured a new set of models known as the 24K alluding to the number of cases played per game.

The fifth season introduced celebrities as case models, known as the "20 Lucky Stars", a first in the franchise's history. Each month, twenty celebrities held twenty briefcases, with their tenure ending at the close of the month, when they were replaced by a new batch of celebrity case holders. Contestants for each episode were selected through the Gulong ng Tala (Wheel of Stars; a roulette-like wheel), or Lucky Wheel (wheel with 20 three-pegged spaces) during the sixth season. Since the celebrities did not choose their initial cases, they were given the option to either swap for another briefcase or keep their assigned one until the end of the game.

==== Season 5 ====
After the four batches, the 20 Lucky Stars were combined into a single group, with selected members from each batch assigned different case numbers for specific games.

The following table lists the celebrities who served as case models, divided into four batches.

List of Kapamilya, Deal or No Deal season 5 celebrity case holders
Case No.	Batch 1	Batch 2	Batch 3	Batch 4
1	Ryan Bang	Deniesse Joaquin	Niño Muhlach	Anton Diva
2	Melanie Marquez	Giselle Sanchez	Negi	Bonel Balingit
3	Donnalyn Bartolome	Marx Topacio	Gary Lim	Mutya Johanna Datul
4	Garie Concepcion	Wilma Doesnt	**Ara Mina**	MM Magno and MJ Magno of MMJ*
5	Yam Concepcion	Ian Batherson	Sylvia Sanchez	Jon Lucas
6	Long Mejia	Loonie	Jett Pangan of The Dawn	John Spainhour
7	Dominic Roque	Atak Araña	Ella Cruz	Regine Angeles
8	Baron Geisler	Candy Pangilinan	Vandolph Quizon	Boom Labrusca*
9	Bianca Manalo	Neil Coleta	Hero Angeles	Sue Ramirez
10	Arron Villaflor	Miko Palanca†	Bayani Agbayani	Aiko Climaco
11	Arlene Muhlach	Dennis Padilla	Meg Imperial	Myrtle Sarrosa
12	Bonito	Nadia Montenegro	Ariella Arida	Tanya Gomez
13	Epy Quizon	Joross Gamboa	Bodie Cruz	Arjo Atayde
14	Ramon Christopher	**Bearwin Meily**	Daiana Menezes	Archie Alemania
15	Karen Reyes	Bea Rose Santiago	Mary Jean Lastimosa	Jeric Raval
16	Rez Cortez	Maui Taylor of Viva Hot Babes	Vickie Rushton	Pooh
17	Markki Stroem	Teddy Corpuz of Rocksteddy	Jason Abalos	KC Montero
18	Niña Jose	Valerie Concepcion	Neil Perez	Frenchie Dy
19	Matt Evans	JV Kapunan	Hyubs Azarcon	Melissa Ricks
20	Eric Nicolas	Bangs Garcia	Gio Alvarez	Paul Jake Castillo

Notes

- Names in **bold** are winners of ₱1,000,000 prize.
- Names with * played the game, but their episode never aired.

==== Season 6 ====
The Lucky Stars from the previous seasons Negi, Maui Taylor of Viva Hot Babes, and Long Mejia, all reprised their roles along the new cast of "lucky stars". The first episode to begin with the format was in episode three.

List of Kapamilya, Deal or No Deal season 6 celebrity case holders
Case No.	Holders				
Case No.	Episodes 1 & 2	Batch 1 (Episodes 3 to 14; 16 to 19)	Batch 2		Batch 3
Case No.	Episodes 1 & 2	Batch 1 (Episodes 3 to 14; 16 to 19)	Transition	Permanent	Batch 3
1	Bassilyo		Marco Masa*	Bobby Andrews^{1}^{,}^{2}	Empoy Marquez^{3}^{,}^{4}
2	Kolette Madelo			Maui Taylor of Viva Hot Babes	Roxanne Guinoo^{5}
3	Cris Villanueva		Troy Montero*	Emilio Daez^{6}^{,}^{7}^{,}^{8}	Brent Manalo^{9}^{,}^{12}
4	Ynez Veneracion			Kim Rodriguez^{6}	Karina Bautista^{10}
5	Jeremy G	Rave Victoria	Long Mejia^{8}^{,}^{11}^{,}^{12}		Esnyr^{13}^{,}^{14}
6	Negi^{14}		Maui Taylor of Viva Hot Babes	Jannah Alanise Chua	Eliza Borromeo^{15}
7	Inah Evans		Negi^{16}^{,}^{17}^{,}^{18}		Patricia 'Patsy' Reyes^{14}^{,}^{28}
8	Diego Gutierrez	Jameson Blake^{19}	Mauro Lumba^{20}^{,}^{21}		Pepay Aguilar^{22}^{,}^{23}
9	Christine Samson		Pokwang	Abby Viduya-Yllana^{24}^{,}^{25}	Dylan Menor^{26}
10	Eric Fructuoso		Jeffrey Santos	Iñigo Jose^{27}^{,}^{28}	Krystal Mejes^{29}^{,}^{36}
11	Aubrey Miles		Sharlene San Pedro	Crisha Uy	Leonida and Lester Aguinaldo of The Aguinaldos^{30}
12	AC Bonifacio	Diego Gutierrez^{31}		Jeffrey Santos^{20}^{,}^{32}	Hana Beshie
13	Arizona Brandy		Crisha Uy	Jenny Miller^{33}	Iñigo Jose
14	Leonida and Lester Aguinaldo of The Aguinaldos		Betong Sumaya*	**Abdul & Marsy**^{18}^{,}^{34}^{,}^{35}	Dawn Chang
15	Anji Salvacion	AC Bonifacio^{36}	Anji Salvacion^{7}^{,}^{37}^{,}^{38}^{,}^{39}		Ryan Eigenmann
16	Red Ollero		Pepay Aguilar^{16}		Negi^{16}
17	Long Mejia		Migs Bustos	Geneva Cruz of Smokey Mountain^{32}^{,}^{40}	Migs Bustos
18	Asia Yoona		Joyce 'Joyang' Glorioso		Abby Viduya-Yllana
19	Jopay Paguia-Zamora		Kim Rodriguez^{31}	Migs Bustos	Long Mejia^{41}
20	Pepay Aguilar	Jeremy G^{42}	Jenny Miller	Sharlene San Pedro^{25}^{,}^{37}^{,}^{43}	Kim Rodriguez^{44}

Notes

- Names in **bold** are winners of ₱1,000,000 prize.
- Names with * did not play the game.
- Italicized names are the returning celebrity case models from the previous season.

List of Substitute Lucky Stars
**^1** Long Mejia substituted in Episodes 23 & 24.
**^2** Betong Sumaya was initially assigned to Case 1 until Episode 26.
**^3** Eric Fructuoso substituted for Empoy in Episode 50.
**^4** Roxanne Guinoo was moved to Case 1 in Episodes 54, 57, & 60.
**^5** Marcelito Pomoy substituted for Guinoo in Episodes 54, 57, & 60.
**^6** Marco Masa was initially assigned to Case 3 until Episode 24 but switched places with Rodriguez in Episodes 23 & 24. Masa also substituted in Episodes 26 & 27 to Case 10.
**^7** Kim Rodriguez switched places with Masa in Episodes 23 & 24 and substituted for Salvacion in Episodes 20 & 22.
**^8** Iñigo Jose substituted for Daez in Episode 46, and switched places with Mejia in Episodes 30, 38, & 42.
**^9** Krystal Mejes was moved to Case 3 in Episodes 54, 57, & 60.
**^10** Brent Manalo was moved to Case 4 in Episodes 54, 57, & 60.
**^11** Sharlene San Pedro substituted for Mejia in Episodes 23 & 24.
**^12** Rave Victoria substituted for Mejia in Episodes 43 & 61, and for Manalo in Episode 50.
**^13** Igi Boy Flores substituted for Esnyr in Episode 50.
**^14** Pepay Aguilar substituted for Negi in Episodes 10 & 13; for Reyes in Episode 50; and for Esnyr in Episodes 54, 57, & 60.
**^15** Zaijian Jaranilla substituted for Borromeo in Episodes 54, 57, & 60.
**^16** Divine Tetay substituted for Negi in Episodes 21, 26, 27, 54, 57, & 60; and for Pepay in Episodes 23 & 24.
**^17** Beki Velo acted as a recurring substitute for Negi.
**^18** Jeffrey Santos was moved to Case 7 in Episode 46 and was initially assigned to Case 14 in Episodes 21, 26 to 28.
**^19** Diego Gutierrez acted as a recurring substitute for Blake.
**^20** Marco Navarra substituted for Lumba in Episodes 34 & 39, and for Santos in Episode 46.
**^21** Jenny Miller was moved to Case 8 in Episode 46.
**^22** Yllana Aduana substituted for Pepay in Episode 50.
**^23** Patricia 'Patsy' Reyes was moved to Case 8 in Episodes 54, 57, & 60.
**^24** Pokwang was initially assigned to Case 9 until Episode 28 but played in Episode 24.
**^25** Geneva Cruz of Smokey Mountain substituted in Episodes 26 & 27, and for San Pedro in Episodes 23 & 24.
**^26** Empoy Marquez substituted for Menor in Episodes 50, 54, 57, & 60.
**^27** Reiven Umali was initially assigned to Case 10 until Episode 28.
**^28** Abdul & Marsy substituted for Jose in Episode 46, and for Reyes in Episodes 54, 57, & 60.
**^29** Reign Parani substituted for Mejes in Episode 50.
**^30** Eliza Borromeo substituted for The Aguinaldos in Episodes 54, 57, & 60.
**^31** Jeremy G acted as a recurring substitute for Gutierrez and substituted for Rodriguez in Episodes 20 & 22.
**^32** Cris Villanueva was initially assigned to Case 12 in Episodes 21, 26 to 28, and substituted for Cruz in Episodes 23 & 24.
**^33** Negi was moved to Case 13 in Episode 46.
**^34** Maey Bautista substituted in Episodes 23 & 24.
**^35** Mauro Lumba was moved to Case 14 in Episode 46.
**^36** Anji Salvacion acted as a recurring substitute for Bonifacio.
**^37** Karina Bautista acted as a recurring substitute for Salvacion; substituted for San Pedro in Episodes 43 & 61, and was moved to Case 10 in Episodes 54, 57, & 60.
**^38** Asia Yoona substituted for Salvacion in Episodes 30, 38, & 42.
**^39** Lorraine Galvez substituted for Salvacion in Episodes 34 & 39.
**^40** Kitkat substituted for Cruz in Episodes 26 & 27.
**^41** Bobby Andrews substituted for Mejia in Episodes 54, 57, & 60.
**^42** Kobie Brown acted as a recurring substitute for Jeremy G.
**^43** Jopay Paguia-Zamora substituted for San Pedro in Episodes 30, 38, & 42.
**^44** Sam Coloso substituted for Rodriguez in Episode 50.

== Winners of at least ₱1,000,000 ==
Throughout the show's history, 31 contestants had won at least ₱1 million, with seven being played as teams; 10 contestants or teams won the top prize, with four of them winning ₱2 million. Those contestants or teams who have won that much is dubbed by the show as "Milyonaryo" (a wordplay of the word "millionaire"). (Note: Similarly, a contestant who won the minimum ₱1 is dubbed by the show as a "Pisonaryo", a wordplay of the word "Peso".)
Color key

The contestant(s) won at the top prize on the board.
The contestant(s) declined the final deal and won the bigger possible amount.
The contestant(s) accepted a deal and won the bigger possible amount.
The contestant(s) declined the final deal and left with the smaller possible amount.
The contestant(s) accepted a deal and left with the smaller possible amount.

No.	Episode air date	Contestant	Amount inside chosen briefcase	Deal amount (if sold)	Amount on other case	Notes
Season 1 (June 5, 2006 – February 23, 2007)
1	August 7, 2006	Edna Amarille	₱1,000,000 (#7)	₱499,000	₱10,000 (#25)	Amarille claimed that the omens from her late daughter prompted her to defend her chosen briefcase all the way to the end. Amarille and her family's life story were later adapted into a Maalaala Mo Kaya episode.
2	September 25, 2006	Elsa Payumo	₱400	₱1,127,000	₱2,000,000	Payumo donated her winnings to the Buklod ng Pag-ibig Community to complete the roof of its building. Payumo was the first millionaire via accepting a banker offer.
3	December 29, 2006	Terry Lim Cua	₱2,000,000 (#8)	₱1,400,000	₱1,000,000	Cua, a bank customer service representative, was the first male contestant to win at least ₱1 million and the first to win the top prize. Cua played a perfect game, having kept the top three amounts on the board till the very end, then eliminated ₱500,000 in the final round leaving the top two amounts on the board. After the game, the banker congratulated him via a phone call while Aquino asked for Cua's necklace and shared the closing announcement with him in the episode. As of the show's closure, Cua was the only contestant to win the ₱2 million as the top prize displayed in the board (there were three other contestants who have won ₱2 million, but said amount was not the top prize).
4	February 19, 2007	Robert Jaworski	₱2,000,000	₱1,000,007	₱200,000	Jaworski, a former senator and PBA player, was the first celebrity millionaire. All bank offers by him at least had his former jersey number (7) or have its digits add up to it. His eventual offer that he sold was offered twice.
Season 2 (June 11, 2007 – January 11, 2008)
5	July 10, 2007	Jennel Montero	₱1,000,000 (#21)	₱600,000	₱500,000	
6	August 6, 2007	Allen Paul Aguada	₱2,000,000 (#20)	₱2,250,000	₱3,000,000 (#14)	Aguada was the second contestant to play a perfect game by keeping the top two amounts on the board to the end. The final offer was the largest amount that have declined in the series; as such, he was also the only millionaire to decline a final seven-figure offer and ended up winning a lower prize. Aquino described Aguada as lucky during the later stages of the game after eliminating the last two small amounts (₱5 and ₱150), and the banker also congratulated him via phone. According to Aguada, his father was originally the contestant, but he urged him to play instead.
7	September 5, 2007	Jerhan Mama-O	₱2,000,000 (#2)	₱999,999	₱250,000 (#7)	Mama-O, a father of Marawi City, Mindanao, was the last civilian contestant to win ₱2 million in the Philippine version. His choice of his briefcase was by his instincts, and while he knocked out the ₱1 million and ₱3 million in the first round, he believed that his briefcase would have ₱2 million, which was later proven correct. After eliminating ₱1 in the final round, he was given the final offer of ₱999,999, as because Mama-O is a Muslim, the amount was based from the 99 names of God according to Islam.
8	October 2, 2007	Rene Lamprea	₱400 (#5)	₱1,250,000	₱3,000,000	Lamprea's choice of his briefcase was based on the omens from his late younger brother (his death date on October 5 and the five-peso coin). Lamprea was the first millionaire after the show moved to the new timeslot of 6:00 PM.
9	October 16, 2007	Melody Macol	₱1,000,000 (#9)	₱499,000	₱250,000	According to Macol, the ₱250,000 happens to be the value amount which her house was at mortgage. Macol was coincidentally the ninth millionaire based on the numerical and her chosen briefcase, where the same numbered briefcase Aquino chose when she played as a contestant four days earlier, where she won ₱50.
10	October 22, 2007	Aiko Melendez	₱3,000,000 (#18)	₱1,000,000	₱50,000	Melendez, actress and Quezon City second District Councilor, played for her charity for East Avenue Medical Center; she was the second celebrity millionaire in the series, after Robert Jaworski.
11	November 6, 2007	Kim Atienza	₱1,000,000	₱400,000	₱25,000	The banker's final offer, which according to Atienza, was the life span in years of the quahog clam.
12	December 12, 2007	Maria Rosario Odabel	₱1,000,000	₱600,000	₱250,000	Odabel managed to kept all six-digit amounts and ₱1 million after opening the ₱75, the last amount on the left side of the board.
Season 3 (July 28, 2008 – March 27, 2009)
13	November 3, 2008	Anthony Solis	₱1,000,000 (#9)	₱490,000	₱100,000 (#10)	Solis's board in the penultimate round contained the amounts of ₱100,000, ₱200,000 and ₱1 million, and his penultimate banker offer was ₱368,000.
14	November 17, 2008	Rey Beltran	₱200,000 (#7)	₱1,100,000	₱2,000,000 (#2)	Beltran's penultimate bank offer was ₱780,000, before opening the ₱400,000 next in the final round. According to the banker, the reason for the non-exact amounts in his offers was because he was tithing some of his winnings for the Christian fellowships he was supporting.
15	November 25, 2008	Aiko Melendez & Candy Pangilinan	₱1,000,000 (#22)	₱345,001	₱10 (#24)	Melendez and Pangilian were the first team to win at least ₱1 million, and due to the twists during the Christmas Edition, they were also the second contestants to win the top prize on the board in two years, after Terry Lim Cua. Both contestants were also repeat contestants, and Melendez was the only contestant to win at least ₱1 million on both appearances.
16	December 1, 2008	Jhaphet Flordeliza	₱1,000,000 (#13)	₱150,000	₱50 (#6)	Flordeliza's board in the penultimate round contained ₱50 and two ₱1 million amounts, and his penultimate banker offer was ₱466,000. Flordeliza was the only civilian contestant to win the top prize during the 2008 Christmas Edition run, and the third to win the top prize.
17	December 11, 2008	Arnel Pineda	₱1,000,000 (#5)	₱249,999	₱200 (#11)	Pineda, a lead singer of the American band Journey, was the second-ever internationally known celebrity to play in the game (after apl.de.ap less than a year before), the fourth overall celebrity millionaire, and the third and final millionaire during the 2008 Christmas Edition. According to Pineda, he visited Philippines to spend his Christmas in his homeland while his band was taking a tour break.
18	January 12, 2009	Judy Ann Santos & Ryan Agoncillo	₱75 (#8)	₱1,000,030	₱4,000,000 (#2)	Actors Santos and Agoncillo's penultimate offer was initially ₱1,150,000, but later increased to ₱1,500,000 after their manager Alfie Lorenzo joined in as part of the banker's promise. After declining the offer and then eliminating ₱1 million in the ensuing final round, their bank offer was lowered to ₱1,000,030, which the ₱30 referenced both contestants totals during their first stint in the show (Santos and Agoncillo respectively won ₱25 and ₱5). After the game, they pledged to use their winnings to fund their campaign for their film Ploning to be included as nomination for the Best Foreign Language Film in the 81st Academy Awards.
19	January 28, 2009	Maribuena Noche	₱1 (#22)	₱1,075,600	₱500,000 (#11)	After eliminating ₱10 in the penultimate round, Noche took the ₱1,075,600 offer, which according to the banker, the extra ₱75,600 was a reference to her mother's medical bills. Her deal was at the correct opportunity, having that she would have knocked out the top prize of ₱4 million next (which was inside briefcase #2), and her next potential bank offer would have dropped down to ₱275,600 (which also had the extra ₱75,600).
20	February 2, 2009	Gerald Anderson & Jake Cuenca	₱2,000,000 (#3)	₱838,000	₱75,000 (#9)	Anderson and Cuenca, both being the lead actors of the hit drama Tayong Dalawa, started the game rough by opening ₱4 million in the first round and most of the six-digit amounts, but eventually rebounded on winning ₱2 million in the end. Both of them were also repeat contestants but they have paired with different partners on their first appearances, with Kim Chiu (in season 1) and Roxanne Guinoo (in season 2) respectively. Probably to prevent any misunderstanding, they brought in every male supporters. Anderson later appeared in season four, but won the minimum ₱1. After the ₱2 million prize was removed in season five, they were the last ₱2 million winners in the show to date.
21	February 16, 2009	Christopher Viray	₱4,000,000	₱1,600,000	₱75,000	After Viray eliminated ₱400 in the penultimate round, his next offer he turned down was ₱1,050,000 (originally ₱750,000). He opened the ₱500,000 amount in the final round, giving the final offer of ₱1,600,000. The amount accepted by Viray was the largest Banker's offer that has been accepted by a contestant in the show series. The deal was made under the advice of his supporters, particularly his older brother Robert. Viray was also the last millionaire during Aquino's tenure.
Season 4 (February 25, 2012 – September 28, 2013)
22	August 18, 2012	Kean Cipriano & Enchong Dee	₱1,000,000 (#21)	₱420,000	₱10 (#7)	Cipriano and Dee were the first millionaires after Manzano took over as host. As of this episode, the show have stopped acknowledging the numerical count of millionaires, and the millionaire chyron is no longer displayed on the screen.
23	December 29, 2012	Janice de Belen	₱1,000,000 (#11)	₱563,855	₱25,000 (#16)	
24	June 8, 2013	Boy Abunda	₱2,000,000 (#3)	₱1,186,003	₱5 (#9)	According to Abunda, he actually accepted the offer not willingly to take the risk as he was playing for charity.
25	August 31, 2013	Genelyn Sandaga	₱2,000,000 (#6)	₱1,123,000	₱25,000 (#19)	Sandaga was the last millionaire to date to win more than ₱1 million via an offer. Due to the new contestant format introduced in season five where celebrities are playing instead, Sandaga was also the last civilian millionaire (and the only one during Manzano's tenure) to date.
Season 5 (February 9, 2015 – March 4, 2016)
26	March 23, 2015	Bearwin Meily	₱1,000,000 (#14)	₱614,000	₱100,000 (#9)	Meily was the first contestant to win the top prize on the board in seven years.
27	April 17, 2015	Ara Mina	₱1,000,000 (#7)	₱355,000	₱100 (#2)	Mina's board in the penultimate round contained the amounts of ₱100, ₱500,000 and ₱1 million, and her penultimate banker offer was ₱407,000.
28	August 14, 2015	Bela Padilla & Joyce Bernal	₱1,000,000 (#19)	₱699,000	₱400,000 (#9)	Padilia and Bernal were the first contestants this season who won the ₱1 million who were not part of the "lucky stars".
29	September 7, 2015	Kaye Abad & Nikki Valdez	₱1,000,000 (#2)	₱510,000	₱50,000 (#1)	Abad & Valdez were the last team to win the ₱1 million in the show until nearly 11 years later in 2026.
30	January 8, 2016	Janine Tugonon	₱1,000,000 (#1)	₱650,000	₱300,000 (#7)	Tugonon was the final millionaire in the series prior to the show going for a 10-year hiatus.
Season 6 (April 25, 2026 – present)
31	August 2, 2026	David "Abdul" Domanais & Christian "Marsy" Kimp Atip	₱1,000,000 (#6)	₱560,000	₱125,000 (#9)	Domanais and Kimp Atip were the first millionaires since the show's revival. It also marked the first time in the Philippine series where confetti was sprayed during a top prize win. On the following episode aired August 8 featuring celebrity Angeline Quinto, the duo (who held briefcase #14) coincidentally held the ₱1 million top prize.

== Parodies and crossover episodes ==
- Toni Gonzaga of Gudtaym (a sitcom previously aired on ABS-CBN) hosted "Kapamilya Meal or No Meal," which was a parody of the show. Filipinos from low income brackets were invited to the studio to play for the meal they wish to eat. The contestants were literally not given dinner to eat before the game. In the pilot installment of the sketch, the contestant won and got to eat tuyô (dried fish). The prizes were lechon (roasted pig) with ₱6,000, tinolang manók (stewed chicken soup) with ₱3,000, adobong dagâ (rat stewed with soy sauce), tuyô, and asín (salt).
- Wazzup Wazzup of ABS-CBN's sister network Studio 23 also came up with a parody dating segment titled "Kazupista, Feel or No Feel". TV5's Lokomoko High later premiered a similarly premised sketch named "Feel or No Feel," but this time, the parody involved underwear.
- In 2006, Wow Maling Mali on ABC-5, hosted by Joey de Leon, impersonating Kris Aquino, made a spoof named "Kabarangay, Beer or No Beer", with some males as the crossdressing version of the (less than) 26K, and a go-go dancing-Banker in a covered cage, offering beer in exchange of the value within the briefcases.
- John en Shirley, a sitcom aired on ABS-CBN during Deal or No Deal's first season, featured a crossover (episode 8, aired September 16, 2006) where one of the sitcom's title characters, John H. Puruntong (portrayed by Philippine Comedy King Dolphy) played as a contestant of the game show as his family had a debt of ₱134,000. John fought for the value of his briefcase until the end, refusing the banker's offer of ₱101,000. His briefcase contained ₱200,000, while the other remaining briefcase contained ₱1.
- When the Commission on Elections opened the filing of candidacy for the midterm senatorial elections in the Philippines last January 15, 2007, several individuals applied for candidacy, even those that are considered nuisance candidates like a certain Daniel Magtira who introduced himself as Kris Aquino's husband. After two days, a certain Julieto Esmeralda Sr., who claims to be both a pastor and a businessman, filed his candidacy referring to himself as Mr. Deal signifying his aiming of building a culture of optimism to prevail among Filipinos. He was quoted on National TV saying "I want people to know that the answer to everything is always 'deal', walang laban o bawi, always 'deal'," referring to the Laban o Bawi segment of Eat Bulaga!.
- Noynoy Aquino, Kris Aquino's brother and a senatorial candidate for the 2007 Philippine Midterm Elections, released a "Deal or No Deal" inspired political advertisement for television. In the commercial, Kris recalled how strict Noynoy was as well as how hard he struggled to take care of the family as requested by their father Ninoy Aquino prior to their father's 1983 assassination. Kris even made a "Deal" pose and catchphrase in the last part of the commercial, signifying her way of convincing the voters to vote for him. Ironically, Noynoy's response to Kris in the ad was "Ayos, Game Na", inspired from the catchphrase of Kris Aquino's game show Pilipinas, Game KNB?. Noynoy won the senate race and landed on the 6th out of 12 slots.
- On the October 12, 2007 episode, McDonald's Philippines launched its advertisement featuring Kris Aquino playing "Meal or No Meal" over the counter with a McDonald's cashier. The McDonald's crew featured in the commercial were holding trays instead of briefcases containing the "value meals" that can be selected by patrons of the fast food chain. The restaurant chain also had a raffle promotion in which its winner eventually played in the show.
- On the ABS-CBN comedy special Poohkwang topbilled by Pooh and Pokwang, the game show sketch Wow Wow Wheel or No Deal Ka Na Ba?, juxtaposed the title of Wowowee, Wheel of Fortune, Kapamilya, Deal or No Deal and Pilipinas, Game KNB?. It featured Kim Idol as game show master while Pooh and Pohkwang were portrayed as Rey and Marina respectively.

== Criticisms ==
- Philippine Daily Inquirer columnist Nestor U. Torre expressed disappointment in the show because it is not "all that spellbinding and empathetic" since the briefcase a contestant has chosen would keep it to the end (contrary to some versions which exchanging briefcases is allowed). Also, he pointed out that the format of the show limited Aquino's effectivity as a host.
- In his January 18, 2007 column, Nestor U. Torre expressed that the game show makes it so difficult for its players to win big because it's based on sheer luck, with a player's fate being sealed by the choice he makes of a particular briefcase to place his hopes on at the start of the game. He cited that another major factor that reduces players' winnings is the "greed" motive that pushes contestants to reject already substantial deals from the show's resident "banker," because they want to make even more money by pushing the game into the next round. However, Torre does recognize that subsequent contestants were the first to benefit from the game show's beefed-up top prize and will bring new excitement in everyone involved—the contestants, the studio audience, and the host. He mentioned that the move to double the game's pot sets the show apart from other game programs, many of which offer a couple of million pesos in potential top winnings. With its P4 million pot for the 2007 run of the first season, he pointed out that it is now the best game show to beat.
- The July 14, 2006 episode featuring psychic Rene Mariano became controversial when the host complimented Rene's abilities because the latter predicted the end of the career of Hero Angeles, Star Circle Quest grand champion, at Morning Girls with Kris and Korina (previously aired on the same network). Hero and his brother reacted at GMA Network's Startalk saying that the host's remarks were unnecessary and foul.

== World Tour U.S. episode ==
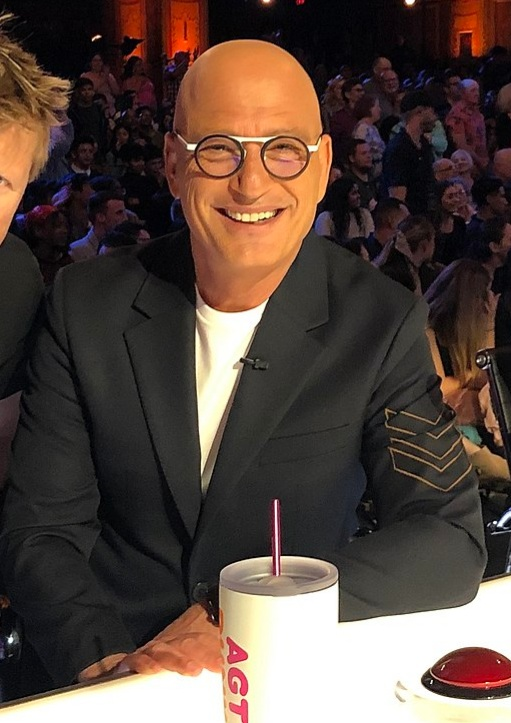
Howie Mandel

In April 2008, the U.S. version of Deal or No Deal filmed an episode from the studio of the Filipino version, as part of a series of "World Tour" episodes showcasting international entries in the franchise. The episode was conducted in a similar manner to the U.S. version of the format, featuring an American contestant and prizes in U.S. dollars. Kris Aquino joined U.S. host Howie Mandel as co-host. The episode premiered on NBC in the U.S. on May 5, 2008, and aired on ABS-CBN on June 22; although it was actually the last of the "World Tour" episodes to actually be filmed (the first was filmed from the Estonian version Võta või jäta), ABS-CBN business unit head Alou Almaden stated that Endemol USA "loved the episode so much" that it was aired first instead.

ABS-CBN's PR campaign for that event also earned the show a Philippine Quill Award of Merit in the same year.

== Reception ==
Kapamilya, Deal or No Deal has been consistently topping on its timeslot. Season 4 aired the show's highest-rated overall episode, aired on October 6, 2012, with Vice Ganda as the guest player and garnering a nationwide rating of 32.7%. This is, to date, the highest-rated episode for any game show on Philippine television.

== See also ==
- List of programs broadcast by ABS-CBN
- List of Kapamilya Channel original programming
- List of Kapamilya Online Live original programming
- List of A2Z original programming
- List of All TV original programming
- List of TV5 original programming
