= Katya Santos =

Filipino actress

- Born: 1981 or 1982 (age 43–44); Manila, Philippines
- Occupation: Actress
- Years active: 1992–present
- Children: 1

Katya Santos (born 1981/1982) is a Filipino actress. She started her career on the Philippine television series Ang TV and then Oki Doki Doc at the age of 13. She later became a sex symbol in Philippine cinema after becoming a member of the Viva Hot Babes, which also included other actresses such as Maui Taylor, Gwen Garci and Andrea del Rosario. Perhaps she is known for her role as Carla in the drama series Anna Karenina which ran in 1996-2002 and in the afternoon drama series Dangal where she played Iyanna Salve, previously aired on GMA Network.

Santos was born in Manila and graduated with a degree in Business Administration. She used to work as a sales consultant for a security systems corporation.

Santos has also been a long time Viva contract artist alongside other Viva Hot Babes such as Andrea del Rosario and Maui Taylor. In 2011, they reunited for an FHM photo shoot.

== Filmography ==
=== Television ===
| Year | Title | Role | Notes | Source |
|---|---|---|---|---|
| 1992–96 | Ang TV | Herself / Various characters | | |
| 1993–95 | Oki Doki Doc | Katya | | |
| 1995 | T.G.I.S | Missy | Guest, 1 episode | |
| 1996–2002 | Anna Karenina | Carla | | |
| 1996 | Hiraya Manawari | Emily | Episode “Nawawalang Kwintas” | |
| 1998 | Halik sa Apoy | Jenny | | |
| 2000 | May Bukas Pa | Tricia | | |
| 2003 | Kool Ka Lang | Katya | Guest, 1 episode | |
| 2003–2004 | Whattamen | Blossom | | |
| 2005 | Yes, Yes Show! | Herself - Host | | |
| 2006 | Now and Forever: Dangal | Ivanna | | |
| 2007 | Sineserye Presents: Hiram na Mukha | Morita Ponce | | |
| 2010 | Pablo S. Gomez' Juanita Banana | Margaux Mamaril | | |
| 2011 | Maalaala Mo Kaya | Irene | Episode: "TV" | |
| 2011 | Maria la del Barrio | Cha-Cha | | |
| 2012 | Luv U | Sylvia | | |
| 2012 | Mundo Man ay Magunaw | Young Lailani "Lani" San Juan | | |
| 2012 | Wansapanataym | Elsa | Episode: "Da Revengers" | |
| 2013 | Wansapanataym | Belen | Episode: "Nicolas Layas" | |
| 2013 | Little Champ | Maricel | | |
| 2014 | Maalaala Mo Kaya | Yvette Bautista | Episode: "Marriage Contract" | |
| 2014 | Villa Quintana | Linda Carillo | | |
| 2014 | Strawberry Lane | Helena | | |
| 2014 | Be Careful with my Heart | Camille | | |
| 2014 | Dream Dad | Precious San Juan-Castro | | |
| 2015 | On the Wings of Love | Ofelia Medina | Special participation | |
| 2015 | Marimar | Vanessa | | |
| 2015 | Karelasyon | Sandra | Episode: "Cougar" | |
| 2016 | Born for You | Tess | | |
| 2017 | Road Trip | Herself / Guest | | |
| 2018 | FPJ's Ang Probinsyano | Blossom Santos | | |
| 2018 | Precious Hearts Romances Presents: Los Bastardos | Young Irma | | |
| 2019 | Pepito Manaloto: Ang Tunay na Kwento | Daisy Dimalanta | | |
| 2022 | My Papa Pi | Delia | | |
| 2022 | Love in 40 Days | Helen Catapang | | |
| 2023 | Pantaxa: Laiya | | Mentor | |
| 2023 | Can’t Buy Me Love | Edna | | |
| 2024 | Wish Ko Lang! | Tisay | | |
| 2025 | Totoy Bato | Alira | | |
| 2026 | You're My Favorite Song | Beverly "Mama Bebe" Dimaculangan | | |

=== Film ===
| Year | Title | Role | Notes | Source |
|---|---|---|---|---|
| 1994 | Eat All You Can | | | |
| 1996 | Ang TV Movie: The Adarna Adventure | Jajay | | |
| 1996 | Aringkingking: Ang Bodyguard Kong Sexy | Rosario | | |
| 1997 | Wala Na Bang Pag-Ibig? | | | |
| 1998 | Ang Lahat Ng Ito'y Para Sa'yo | Aimee | | |
| 1999 | Honey My Love So Sweet | Vanessa | | |
| 1999 | Kiss Mo 'Ko | Cynthia | | |
| 2000 | Kailangan Ko'y Ikaw | Bel | | |
| 2001 | Radyo | Myla | | |
| 2002 | Ikaw Lamang Hanggang Ngayon | Jean | | |
| 2003 | Sukdulan | Elaine | | |
| 2003 | Sex Drive | Sheila | | |
| 2004 | Keka | Francesca 'Keka' Jose | | |
| 2005 | Boso | Cecilia | Direct-to-video | |
| 2010 | Working Girls | Amy | | |
| 2016 | How to Be Yours | Tanya | | |
| 2019 | Sons of Nanay Sabel | Aling Tetay Waehn | | |
| 2019 | Sanggano, Sanggago't Sanggwapo | Venus | | |
| 2019 | Kainin mo ko Jay | Perlita | | |
| 2021 | Maasim na | Ason | | |
| 2023 | Keys to the Heart | Eva | | |
| 2023 | Mahal Kita, Beksman | Gemma Salvador | | |
| 2024 | Sunny | Becky | | |
| 2024 | Pasahero | Tina | | |
