= Keka (2003 film) =

2003 revenge romantic comedy film by Quark Henares

- Directed by: Quark Henares
- Written by: Quark Henares
- Produced by: Vicente G. del Rosario III; Veronique D. Corpus
- Starring: Katya Santos; Wendell Ramos
- Cinematography: J.A. Tadena
- Edited by: Marya Ignacio
- Music by: Diego Castillo; Diego Mapa
- Production company: Cinema Vendetta Productions
- Distributed by: Viva Films
- Release date: 20 August 2003
- Running time: 93 minutes
- Country: Philippines
- Language: Filipino
- Budget: ₱6 million

Keka is a 2003 Philippine crime thriller romantic black comedy film written and directed by Quark Henares. Starring Katya Santos in a title role and Wendell Ramos, the story follows a call center employee who decides to kill the fraternity members who are responsible for killing her beloved boyfriend. It co-stars Vhong Navarro, Ryan Eigenmann, Bobby Andrews, TJ Trinidad, Luis Alandy, Tristan Enriquez, Jordan Herrera, Marky Lopez, and Tuesday Vargas.

Produced by Cinema Vendetta Productions and distributed by Viva Films, the film premiered on 18 August 2003 as one of the two Philippine films exhibited at the Cinemanila International Film Festival, and its commercial run began on 20 August. It later screened in various international film festivals, including Udine Far East Film Festival in Italy and the Los Angeles Asian Pacific Film Festival in the United States in late April-early May 2004.

== Plot ==
Francheska Jose, popularly known as "Keka," and Pedro Jose "PJ" Valera, the master initiator of the Alpha Kappa Omega fraternity, were deeply in love during their time in university. However, on 4 November 1998, five members of the rival fraternity Sigma Omicron Sigma, consisting of Arvin, Marco, Jigger, Jessie, and Bobbie, murdered PJ, turning her life upside down. To Keka's dismay and rage, the court found the five members innocent after they were implicated in a trial, which led to her decision to kill them all. She had learned martial arts, turned into a recluse, graduated from college, secured employment, and found a place to live in order to prevent the five men from learning about her and her relationship with PJ. Finally, one day, Keka is now prepared to eliminate them after Bong, who was the right-hand at the AKO fraternity, gave important information about the five men and their current whereabouts. Before she commenced the bloodbath, Bong gave Keka a gun.

The bloodbath begins with Arvin Cortez, the group's weakest member. Arvin worked all night at the Gomez and Diaz accounting firm. However, on a rainy night, Arvin leaves the building premises and walks home. Moments later, Keka finds him and begins to shoot him, only to become hesitant twice until she finally shoots him and leaves the area anonymously. A year earlier, police officer Jason proposes marriage to his four-year girlfriend, Kaye, at a posh restaurant, but she rejects him and ends their relationship. Jason becomes a recluse for a year after the heartbreak, but his dedication to his work eventually gets him promoted to detective. His life later changed when he met Keka, and they fell in love.

The bloodbath goes on when Keka strangles Marco Torres and then stabs him with a kitchen knife while they are on a date at her apartment, while Jigger Ortiz, who is playing video games, is stabbed with an ice pick. The reports of their deaths alarmed the remaining two, Jessie Sta. Ana and Bobbie Domingo, who was in the shooting set of a television drama. They thought that someone from the AKO fraternity planned to kill them despite the two fraternities having a ceasefire pact. Unknown to the remaining two, Keka was present and began following Jessie. Keka later kills Jessie by stabbing and slitting his throat.

== Cast ==
Main cast

- Katya Santos as Francheska "Keka" Jose: A titular 23-year-old call center employee who takes revenge by killing her boyfriend's killers.
- Wendell Ramos as Jason: A police detective who later meets and then falls in love with Keka.

The five members of Sigma Omicron Sigma who murdered PJ

- TJ Trinidad as Arvin Cortez: An honor student and the group's total loser who now works as an accounting assistant at an accounting firm.
- Bobby Andrews as Marco Torres: A young man who became a marketing executive of his family-owned shipping company.
- Tristan Enriquez as Jigger Ortiz: An academic overstayer who had not graduated from university.
- Luis Alandy as Jessie Sta. Ana: A commercial model who was known in a deodorant commercial.
- Ryan Eigenmann as Bobbie Domingo: An actor who is the son of a lawmaker.

Supporting cast

- Vhong Navarro as Bong Bisina: PJ's comrade at the Alpha Kappa Omega fraternity. He also gave information about PJ's killers to Keka.
- Jordan Herrera as Pedro Jose "PJ" Valera: Keka's boyfriend and a senior member of the Alpha Kappa Omega fraternity. He was murdered by the rival fraternity.
- Marky Lopez as Ryan: Jason's partner at the police.
- Rissa Samson as Kay: Jason's ex-girlfriend.
- Tuesday Vargas as Mica: Keka's curious neighbor.
- Ramon Bautista and Jun Sabayton as Showbiz Kachipan Chippies

== Production ==
Keka is director Quark Henares's "dream project", which he wrote the screenplay for when he was in high school and served as his homage to Mike de Leon's 1982 psychological drama film, Batch '81. The film's title was named after Francesca "Keka" Enriquez, his art teacher during his Montessori days.

=== Casting ===
Henares considered Jolina Magdangal and Epy Quizon for the title role and Jason, the police detective, respectively. However, he did not protest when the studio executives of Viva Films chose Viva Hot Babes member Katya Santos for the title role, while the role of Jason was given to Bubble Gang mainstay Wendell Ramos. Ramos previously collaborated with the director in his feature film directorial debut, Gamitan, two years earlier.

=== Filming ===
To prepare for this process, the director suggested that Santos watch Luc Besson's 1990 action thriller film, La Femme Nikita, and when they commenced, he was impressed by her on-screen overhaul as well as her willingness to take her character to far heights, particularly her fight scenes with actor Ryan Eigenmann. She also underwent liposuction sessions with dermatologist Vicki Belo, who is also the director's mother, to maintain her physique.

== Reception ==
=== Critical response ===
Film critic Robert Koehler, writing for Variety, gave the film a positive review, describing it as a "refreshing change of pace for Philippine cinema" that combines influences from South Korean and Hong Kong cinema, such as director Wong Kar-wai and cinematographer Christopher Doyle, with the narrative about a darkly sinister yet humorous revenge. He commended director Quark Henares for mastering his craft and defying genre conventions, even though he noted the cast's subpar performances and the lack of overt sexuality, which affected its local box office results. He also praised the film's sophisticated style, inventive cinematic techniques, and ironic humor, which would be a contender for finding success in overseas markets.

Filmmaker Quentin Tarantino, who was one of the director's inspirations, reportedly loved the film when he visited the Philippines for Cinemanila in August 2007.

=== Box office ===
While the film was produced for ₱6 million, the box office results were disappointing, with audiences mistaking it for erotica or a thriller, and fans were disappointed by Katya's role as a serial killer.
