= Alari Kivisaar =

Estonian game show host

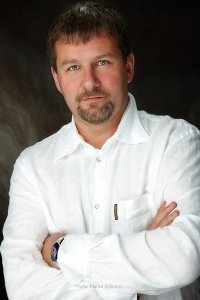
Kivisaar in 2011

Alari Kivisaar (born 16 January 1967 in Tartu) is an Estonian television personality and nature photographer, best known as the host of the game show Võta või jäta.
