= Aguinaldo (name) =

Name list

Aguinaldo is a Portuguese masculine given name and a Tagalog surname. Notable people with this name include:

== Given names ==
- Aguinaldo Braga (born 1974), Brazilian-Macedonian footballer
- Aguinaldo Fonseca (1922–2014), Cape Verdean poet
- Aguinaldo Jaime (born 1954), Angolan economist
- Aguinaldo (footballer) (born 1989), Angolan-Portuguese footballer
- Aguinaldo Ribeiro (born 1969), Brazilian politician
- Aguinaldo Roberto Gallon (born 1958), Brazilian footballer
- Aguinaldo Silva (born 1943), Brazilian writer
- Aguinaldo Tati (born 1990), Angolan handball player

== Surnames ==
- Aguinaldo family, a political family in the Philippines
  - Ameurfina Aguinaldo Melencio (1922–2020), Filipina lawyer
  - Baldomero Aguinaldo (1869–1915), leader of the Philippine Revolution
  - Bernadette Sembrano-Aguinaldo (born 1976), Filipina reporter
  - Cesar Enrique Aguinaldo Virata (born 1930), Filipino former statesman and businessman
  - Críspulo Aguinaldo (1863–1897), Filipino lieutenant general
  - Emilio Aguinaldo (1869–1964), former president of the Philippines
  - Francis Gerald Aguinaldo Abaya (born 1975), Filipino politician
  - Hilaria Aguinaldo (1877–1921), first wife of Emilio Aguinaldo
  - Joseph Emilio Aguinaldo Abaya (born 1966), Filipino politician
  - Reynaldo Aguinaldo (1946–2019), Filipino politician
- Amani Aguinaldo (born 1995), Filipino footballer
- Rodolfo Aguinaldo (born 1946), Filipino politician and former governor of Cagayan
- Sandra Aguinaldo (born 1975), Filipina television news anchor journalist
