= Viva Hot Babes =

Filipino girl group

- Also known as: Hot Babes; VHB
- Origin: Manila, Philippines
- Genres: P-pop; OPM; bubblegum pop; teen pop; dance-pop
- Years active: 2003–present
- Label: Viva Records

The Viva Hot Babes are a celebrity Filipino pop girl group composed of actresses and models, founded in Manila by producer Vicente "Vic" del Rosario, Jr. in 2003. They were mainly spearheaded by actresses Maui Taylor, Katya Santos and Andrea del Rosario. The girls released softcore movies all under Viva Films, as well as a full-length album containing songs with double entendres and sexual innuendos with highly controversial meanings. The group rose to fame after the release of Hotstuff and Hotstuff 2 pornographic magazines, which created a stir in the early 2000s. Their debut single "Bulaklak" was one of the most controversial and critically panned songs of the 2000s, due to its double entendre and underlying sex themes.

== Biography ==
=== Early formation ===
In the 1990s, Viva Films had successfully molded screen favorites like Joyce Jimenez and Rica Peralejo, whose softcore movies raked in millions for the production company. In 2001, Viva Entertainment founder Vicente "Vic" del Rosario, Jr. decided to formally launch a girl group composing of sexy up-and-comers. Former teen star Maui Taylor and Kristine Jaca were among the first to join the group, after their breakthrough stint in the 2001 Metro Manila Film Festival entry, Tatarin. Current Viva contract star Katya Santos before they were named the 'Hot Babes', along with newcomers Jen Rosendahl, Sheree, Gwen Garci, Myles Hernandez, and Hazel Cabrera.

=== In print, film and home media ===
The group was launched in the January 2003 edition of FHM Magazine in the Philippines. They were officially introduced to the public upon the release of the much-publicized Hotstuff magazine, with the inclusion of actress Andrea del Rosario. Hotstuff magazine sold extremely well during the first month it was issued, having 765,000 copies of the magazine sold in just four weeks, which forced Viva Entertainment to print 4,000,000 copies for the rest of the year. After a dispute between the publishers regarding the photos used for the magazine, Taylor left the group to concentrate on a solo career. She remained being managed under Viva Entertainment despite her fall-out with the Hotstuff publishers and continued to co-star in movies with other existing members like Santos and del Rosario.

The girls were initially marketed as a pool of upcoming sexy screen sirens, two of which were launched before the actual formation of the group. Maui Taylor was formally introduced in 2002's Gamitan, as well as Katya Santos in Sukdulan early in 2003 just before the official line-up was finalized. Throughout each of the member's individual activity in the movies, only three managed to obtain leading status: Taylor (in Gamitan, Sex Drive, Masamang Ugat, Bugbog Sarado, and Ang Huling Birhen sa Lupa), Santos (in Sukdulan, Keka, Sex Drive, and Boso) and del Rosario (in Lupe: A Seaman's Wife, and Bugbog Sarado). A special Hot Babes-starred film entitled 1st Time was also released in 2003 with Rosendahl, Garci, and Hernandez being the main characters, and Jaca, Cabrera with newcomer Asia Agcaoili, Ella V. and Anna Leah Javier getting supporting roles.

Other than the theatrical releases of movies featuring many of the girls, the Hot Babes also released softcore home videos. The highly buzzed Viva Hot Babes: Videoke four-volume karaoke home video was released to huge commercial reception. After the success of their karaoke home videos, Taylor released Sex Goddess as soon as she parted from the group in 2003, and a year later, Santos and Agcaoili, released their own home videos entitled Wet, Wild & Kinky...Come Shag Me! and Sex Guru respectively. The video version of the Hotstuff magazine was also released as Hotstuff: The Video, featuring all the original first two batches of the Viva Hot Babes excluding Taylor. Other home video releases under Hot Babe's catalog were Agcaoili's Erotica: Lessons of the Flesh, Jennifer Lee and Sheree's Bosom Bodies: Twin Peaks Exposed, and the final Hot Babes video, Viva Hot Babes Gone Wild in 2007, which featured the return of Taylor in the group. During that same year, multi-award-winning director Peque Gallaga was also set to direct Scorpio Nights 3 (the previous installment catapulted Viva contract star Joyce Jimenez to superstardom) with Sheree in the lead role, but the film failed to materialize.

=== Crossover to the music scene ===
It was during the height of the novelty songs from the likes of the Sexbomb Girls, Masculados, Bayani Agbayani, Joey de Leon and Willie Revillame that the girls decided to embark on their singing career. In 2003, after the success of their karaoke home videos, the group finally released their debut single "Bulaklak" and the EP of the same name. During that same year, the Hot Babes released the controversial "Bulaklak" music video, which was almost banned due to the song's underlying message. "Bulaklak" was written by songwriter Lito Camo, whose compositions have been associated with double entendre and controversial meanings. The group later released the second EP Kikay which featured the song of the same title, before releasing a full-length studio album, Basketbol, a year later. The Viva Hot Babes scored four hit singles in the Philippines: "Bulaklak", "Kikay", "Basketball" and "Batuta ng Pulis", all became huge in radio airplay from 2003 to 2004.

== Line-up changes, comebacks, and member replacements ==
All in all, there were thirty-six members of the Viva Hot Babes. The original line-up was composed of Maui Taylor, Katya Santos, Andrea del Rosario, Jen Rosendahl, Gwen Garci, Myles Hernandez, Kristine Jaca, Hazel Cabrera, and Sheree. When Sheree left in 2003, she was temporarily replaced by Pam Sarmiento. Sheree returned in late 2003 during the release of their first EP, "Bulaklak" and remained with the group until 2007.

In 2004, a new batch of Hot Babes introduced JayCee Parker, Asia Agcaoili, Jennifer Lee, Ella V., and Anna Leah Javier, who previously took part in 1st Time. Both batches of Hot Babes (excluding Taylor who left after the release of the Hotstuff magazine) were included in the release of Hotstuff: The Video. Towards the end of 2004, Javier left and was replaced by Katrina Gonzales, just in time before the release of their first full-length album, Basketbol. In that same year, a search for the next Hot Babe was made though the now-defunct ABS-CBN reality show, To The Max, and it was R'U Miranda who was chosen to be part of the group. Despite winning the search, Miranda's career as a Hot Babe was short-lived as she was never officially signed to Viva Entertainment. It was in that year that Alyssa Alano joined the group, but after becoming a viral sensation (with her performance and diction mishap of the song "Kiss Me"), she pursued a solo career as a comedian outside the management of Viva Entertainment. The last two girls who were included in the second batch were Vanessa Khain and Maia Majendra, who were late additions in 2005.

In 2007, the Hot Babes released their final home video entitled Viva Hot Babes Gone Wild and it saw the return of original member Maui Taylor. The girls who were still part of the group other than Taylor were Katya Santos, Jennifer Lee, Gwen Garci, Myles Hernandez, Vanessa Khain and Hazel Cabrera. The third batch that was introduced in the home video was Vanessa Khain, Carla Samonte, Sachie Sanders, Mara Daniega, together with Maricar dela Fuente and Zara Lopez, who both previously appeared in Erotica: Lessons of the Flesh. During their official return to the scene, they were joined by newly added recruits Briana Blanco, Rachel Villanueva, Sofie Garrucho, Lailanie Vergara, Shanella Strauss, Anna Scott, and Scarlet Garcia, all of which were also part of the third line-up. The fourth batch of Hot Babes, which included Carla Samonte, Precious Adona, Irish Contreras, Russia Rimes, Kaye Villaseñor, and Sharon Cebujano was introduced in 2008. Adona gained a supporting role in Taylor's comeback Viva movie film, Torotot, which was released in 2008.

== List of members ==
VIVA HOTBABES 1

- Maui Taylor
- Katya Santos
- Andrea del Rosario
- Jen Rosendahl
- Gwen Garci
- Myles Hernandez
- Kristine Jaca
- Hazel Cabrera
- Sheree Bautista

VIVA HOTBABES 2

- Asia Agcaoili
- Ella V.
- Jaycee "JC" Parker
- Jennifer Lee
- Anna Leah Javier
- Katrina Gonzales
- Alyssa Alano
- R'U Miranda
- Vanessa Khain
- Maia Majendra

VIVA HOTBABES 3

- Zara Lopez
- Maricar dela Fuente
- Briana Blanco
- Rachel Villanueva
- Sofie Garrucho
- Sachie Sanders
- Mara Deniega
- Lailanie Vergara
- Shanella Strauss
- Anna Scott
- Scarlet Garcia†

VIVA HOTBABES 4

- Precious Adona
- Carla Samonte
- Irish Contreras
- Russia Rimes
- Kaye Villaseñor
- Sharon Cebujano

== Solo ventures ==
- Maui Taylor (2003; 2007–2008, 2013–present)

Taylor was the most popular member and founding member of the group. Oftentimes labeled as the group's main star, Taylor introduced the Hot Babes in the January 2003 edition of FHM Philippines. Her involvement in the Manila Film Festival entry Ang Huling Birhen Sa Lupa enabled her to gain her first nomination as Best Actress in a Leading Role.

- Katya Santos (2003–2008, 2013–present)

Santos was originally a child actress in ABS-CBN's Ang TV and she appeared in the sitcom Oki Doki Doc with Aga Muhlach, Antoinette Taus, and Camille Prats in the 1990s. In the late 1990s, she transferred under Viva management and became part of the GMA Network's Anna Karenina as a villain. Santos was officially launched in the 2003 skin-flick Sukdulan. She is the longest-staying member of the group.

- Andrea del Rosario (2003–2005, 2013–present)

Del Rosario was already an actress in ABS-CBN's Attagirl before she joined the Hot Babes in 2003. her first film as a Hot Babe was 2003's Lupe: A Seaman's Wife and she also took part in the film Bugbog Sarado alongside Taylor and Victor Neri. Del Rosario focused on more serious roles on television when she embarked on ABS-CBN's remake of Gulong Ng Palad. In 2011, she gave birth to a baby girl named Beatrice Anne.

- Gwen Garci (2003–2007)

Garci was launched in the first batch of Hot Babes. Despite being one of the favorites by fans, her career never really took off, and she was limited to softcore bit-player roles mostly. Garci's whirlwind romance with boyfriend Andrew Wolff was talked about in the blogosphere. She gave birth to a daughter named Naima Kimora in 2010. Garci returned as an actress via Lolong, along with del Rosario (as Rosenda) and Taylor (as Kap. Dolores Baticusin).

- Sheree Bautista (2003–2007, 2013–present)

Sheree was a singer before she joined the Hot Babes in 2003. Despite being part of the softcore nature of the group, Sheree initially didn't bare any. In 2008, Sheree and boyfriend Gian Magdangal had a son named Gian Hailey.

== Discography ==
=== Albums ===
Year	Album
2004	Basketbol: Released: 2004; Label: Viva; Format: CD

=== Extended plays ===
Year	Album	Certifications (sales thresholds)
2003	Bulaklak: Released: 2003; Label: Viva; Format: CD	PARI: Platinum
2003	Kikay: Released: 2003; Label: Viva; Format: CD	

=== Singles ===
Title	Year	Album
"Bulaklak"	2003	Bulaklak
"Oops! Ay..."	2003	Bulaklak
"Kikay"	2003	Kikay
"Basketbol"	2004	Basketbol
"Batuta ng Pulis"	2004	Basketbol

== Videography ==
=== Film ===
- 2001: Tatarin
- 2002: S2pid Luv
- 2002: Gamitan
- 2002: Hibla
- 2002: Sukdulan
- 2003: Lupe: A Seaman's Wife
- 2003: Ang Huling Birhen sa Lupa
- 2003: Sex Drive
- 2003: Keka
- 2003: 1st Time
- 2003: Masamang Ugat
- 2003: Bugbog Sarado
- 2005: Boso
- 2005: Ilusyon
- 2006: Co-Ed Scandal
- 2008: Torotot

=== Home videos ===
- Hot Stuff: The Video (2003)
- Maui Taylor: Sex Goddess (2003)
- Viva Hot Babes Videoke Vol. 1: OPM Hits (2003)
- Viva Hot Babes Videoke Vol. 2: Current Hits (2003)
- Viva Hot Babes Videoke Vol. 3: Pop Standards (2003)
- Viva Hot Babes Videoke Vol. 4: Rap-oke (2003)
- Katya Santos: Wet, Wild & Kinky...Come Shag Me! (2004)
- Asia Agcaoili: Sex Guru (2004)
- Erotica: Lessons of the Flesh (2005)
- Pinoy Kama Sutra (2006)
- Bosom Bodies: Twin Peaks Exposed (2007)
- Viva Hot Babes Gone Wild (2007)
- Pinoy Kama Sutra 2 (2008)
