= Diana Qeblawi =

Jordanian-Filipina model, television personality and entrepreneur

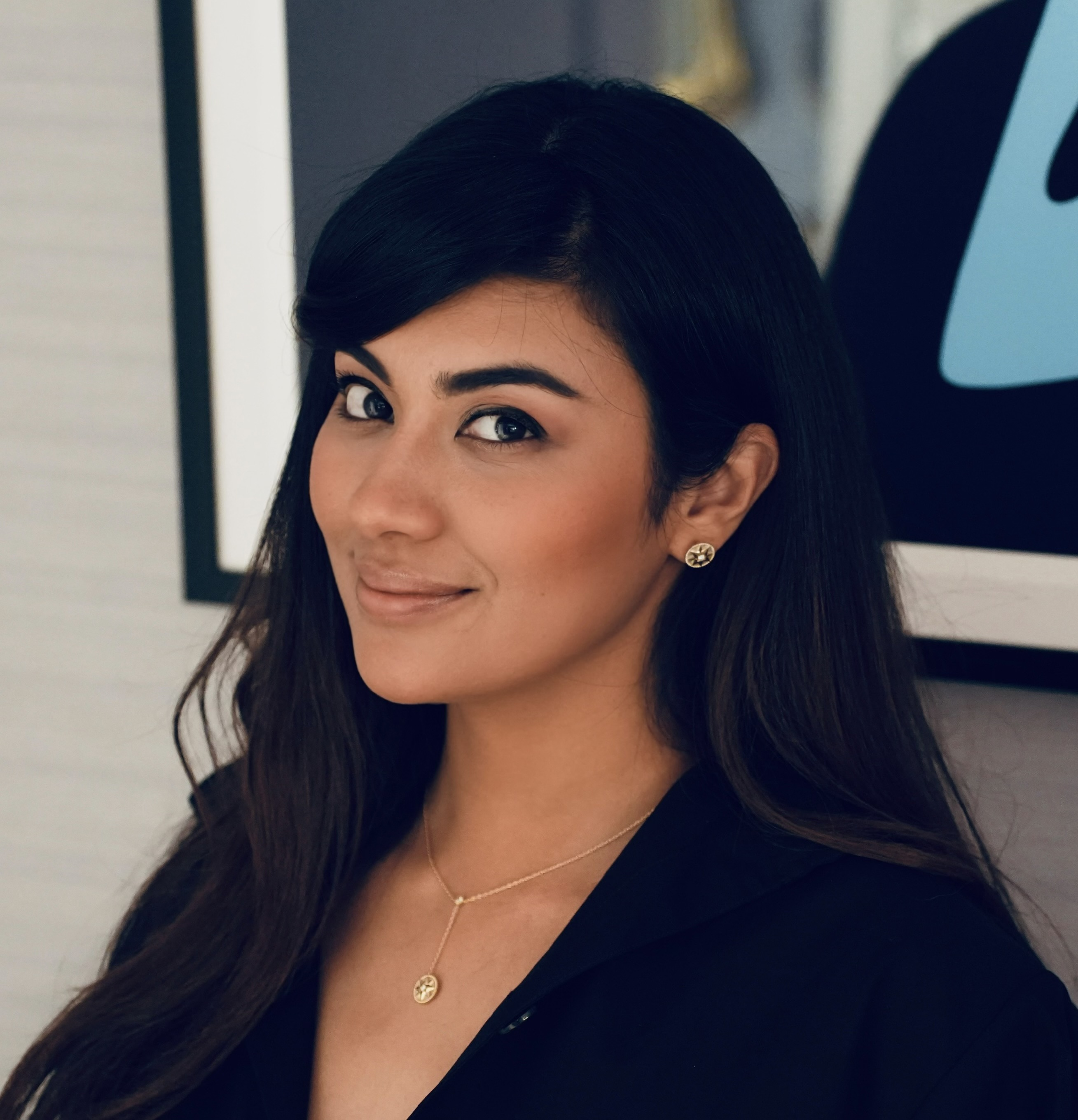
- Qeblawi in 2025
- Born: Diana Qeblawi; January 22, 1990 (age 36); Kuwait
- Other names: Diana Qeblawi Wong
- Occupations: Model, television personality, entrepreneur
- Years active: 2005–present
- Known for: Kapamilya, Deal or No Deal (briefcase model); Founder of Qeblawi Cosmetics
- Spouse: John Wong
- Website: qeblawi.com

Diana Qeblawi (also known as Diana Qeblawi Wong; born January 22, 1990) is a Jordanian-Filipina model, television personality, and entrepreneur. She is best known as one of the original briefcase models (nicknamed the "26K Girl") on the ABS-CBN game show Kapamilya, Deal or No Deal from 2006 to 2009 and as the founder of Qeblawi Cosmetics, a California-based halal-certified beauty brand.

Born in Kuwait to a Palestinian-Jordanian father and a Filipina mother, Qeblawi was raised primarily in Jordan before moving to the Philippines around college age, where she spent her formative years in Caloocan and began her modeling career.

== Early life ==
Qeblawi won the Miss Caloocan title in 2005 while living in Caloocan.

== Career ==
=== Pageantry and early television ===
She gained early recognition as a contestant on GMA Network's reality talent competition StarStruck (season 3) in 2005–2006, advancing to the Final 15.

She later became one of the original briefcase models on Kapamilya, Deal or No Deal, hosted by Kris Aquino, from 2006 to 2009.

=== Modeling and endorsements ===
Qeblawi has appeared in commercials, print campaigns, and runway shows for brands including American Eagle, Converse, Maxi-Peel (Middle East), and BMW Philippines.

=== Entrepreneurship ===
In November 2021 she founded Qeblawi Cosmetics in California — the first Arab-Filipina-owned halal-certified cosmetics brand. The line is vegan, cruelty-free, hypoallergenic, paraben-free, and EU-compliant, with a focus on inclusivity for all skin tones.

In 2025 she visited Manila for media interviews in which she discussed her California-based brand and reflected on her early career.

=== Fashion and recent activities ===
Qeblawi is a frequent attendee at Christian Dior events. In December 2025 she was invited as a VIP guest to the 10th anniversary celebration of the Dior Lady Art collection in New York and is known for incorporating Dior pieces into her personal style.
