= Scarlet Garcia =

Filipino glamour model

- Born: Scarlet Mae Bouffard Garcia; 13 March 1985; Manila, Philippines
- Died: 13 March 2008 (aged 23); Olongapo, Philippines
- Cause of death: Stab and gunshot wound
- Occupations: Glamour model, actress

Scarlet Mae Bouffard Garcia (13 March 1985 – 13 March 2008) was a Filipino glamour model and actress. She and three other people were terrorized and murdered at her home in Olongapo City in 2008.

== Career ==
Popularly known as Scarlet Bouffard, she was one of the girls featured in the FHM Philippines' November 2007 issue and was a member of the Viva Hot Babes for two years.

== Death ==
On 13 March 2008, Garcia, her live-in partner George Castro Jr., 23, Garcia's cousin Rachelle Estacio, 21, and Estacio's boyfriend Von Mark Mandehas, were found dead in Garcia's home in Olongapo City. They were found stabbed and shot when authorities responded to a fire at the home, apparently set in an attempt to destroy evidence of the murders.

Garcia and Estacio were discovered in the bathroom on the second floor of the three storey townhouse unit, and the two men were found in the hall.

Fellow Viva Hot Babes member and FHM model Anna Scott gave details about the crime scene and a supposed police theory as to what happened. According to Scott, Garcia and Castro were found naked, and the police theorized that they were forced to have sex before they were killed.

The background of the murder remains a mystery, although Olongapo City police chief has indicated Castro's connections to an organized crime ring involved in car theft. In January 2009, five suspects were arrested in the province of Rizal. The five men were members of a gang operating in Central Luzon, Metropolitan Manila and Southern Luzon region, known as "Sako".

=== Aftermath ===
On 25 July 2014, a suspect was arrested by the anti-vice unit of the Mandaluyong City police while he was buying cigarettes in Barangay Barangka Ibaba. Senior Superintendent Tyrone Masigon, chief of the city’s police, said the suspect was one of Philippine National Police's most wanted criminals. He had arrest warrants for theft, five counts of rape, and two counts of robbery with intimidation and violence.

The Mandaluyong City Police Anti-vice unit Chief Inspector Dominador Ignacio said they took six months of surveillance to confirm the suspect's identity. He added that the modus operandi of suspect's group was to forcibly enter their target victim’s house, rape the female occupants and hogtie them before robbing them.

The suspect was temporarily detained in Mandaluyong Jail. His custody will be turned over to the Olongapo judge handling his case.
