= Maui Taylor =

Filipino actress

- Born: Maureen Anne Tupaz Fainsan; 28 June 1983 (age 43); Brighton, England
- Education: Colegio San Agustin
- Occupations: Actress, model, singer, actress
- Years active: 1996–present
- Height: 148 cm (4 ft 10 in)
- Children: 2

Maui Taylor (born Maureen Anne Tupaz Fainsan; 28 June 1983) is a Filipino actress and former member of Viva Hot Babes.

== Career ==
Taylor entered the entertainment industry with the aid of a cousin who was a member of a dance group in the Philippines. At age 14, she was cast in the Filipino TV soap opera Anna Karenina, leading to other roles in various films and television shows.

Her first main role came in the sitcom Kool Ka Lang (1998-2003). She also appeared in Back to Iskul Bukol at the same time. However, it was her controversial performance in the 2001 erotic film Tatarin (inspired by National Artist Nick Joaquin's story, The Summer Solstice) that catapulted her to fame, shedding her previously demure and wholesome image.

Her first starring role in the movie Gamitan grossed almost P70 million at the local box office. She also starred in the film Hibla with Rica Peralejo in the same year. In April 2003, she co-starred in the sex comedy Sex Drive with Katya Santos and Wendell Ramos.

Taylor followed up with the movie Ang Huling Birhen sa Lupa, where her performance was well received, earning her a Best Actress nomination, which eventually went to her co-star Ara Mina. Later in 2003, she starred in Masamang Ugat and Bugbog Sarado, as well as a cinematography collection called Sex Goddess.

Taylor was a former member of the Viva Hot Babes, a group of actresses and models created in 2003 by Viva Entertainment founder Vicente Del Rosario, Jr. The original group included fellow actresses Katya Santos, Andrea del Rosario, Kristine Jaca, Sheree, Gwen Garci, Jen Rosendahl, Myles Hernandez, and Hazel Cabrera.

In 2012, Taylor returned to acting in the South Korean film The Taste of Money as the tragic maid of a wealthy conglomerate family. In 2015, she appeared as one of the 20 "lucky stars" in the ABS-CBN game show Kapamilya, Deal or No Deal and was selected as contestant on 26 March where she won ₱141,000 via a banker's offer; her briefcase contained ₱50 while the last unopened amount was ₱500,000. Taylor was one of only three "lucky stars" to reprise her role again in the 2026 season (the others were Long Mejia and Negi), and eventually selected as contestant on 30 August; as with her first appearance, she made the right decision on accepting the banker's offer, by selling her ₱100,000 briefcase for ₱555,000, while the other unopened amount contained the top prize of ₱1 million. With that, her total winnings for both of her appearances totaled to ₱696,000; it was also the largest win for both an accepted offer and outside the grand prize for that season, only behind Abdul & Marsy who won the top prize on earlier that same month.

== Personal life ==
Taylor opted to go low-key after working as an actress for several years in order to focus on her personal life. She and her non-showbiz partner, Anton Sabarre, have two sons, Antoine Miguel and Matteo Alonzo.

She uploads vlogs on YouTube.

== Filmography ==
=== Film ===
| Year | Title | Role | Ref. |
|---|---|---|---|
| 1998 | Ang Lahat ng Ito'y Para Sa'yo | Elena | |
| 1999 | Honey, My Love, So Sweet | Sam | |
| 2001 | Tatarin | Maggie | entry to the 2001 Metro Manila Film Festival |
| 2002 | S2pid Luv | Jo | |
| 2002 | Hibla | Clara | |
| 2002 | Gamitan | Cathy | |
| 2003 | Sex Drive | Sheila | |
| 2003 | Bugbog Sarado | Stella | |
| 2003 | Masamang Ugat | Lara | |
| 2008 | Torotot | | |
| 2012 | The Taste of Money | Eva | |
| 2020 | Pakboys Takusa | Miley | entry to the 2020 Metro Manila Film Festival |
| 2021 | Paglaki Ko, Gusto Kong Maging Pornstar | Herself | |
| 2021 | 69+1 | Ivy | |

=== Television ===
| Year | Title | Role |
|---|---|---|
| 1997–1999 | T.G.I.S. (Thank God It's Sabado) | Marie |
| 1997–2002 | Anna Karenina | Brigitte |
| 1998–2003 | Kool Ka Lang | Waikiki |
| 1999 | Back to Iskul Bukol | |
| 2000–2001 | May Bukas Pa | Ruthy |
| 2003 | Maalaala Mo Kaya: Kotse | Pia Moran |
| 2015, 2026 | Kapamilya, Deal or No Deal | Contestant/Herself |
| 2016 | A1 Ko Sa 'Yo | Donna |
| 2017 | Road Trip | Herself |
| 2017 | D' Originals | Gigi |
| 2018 | FPJ's Ang Probinsyano | Rose |
| 2022 | Lolong | Kapitana Dolores Baticusin |
| 2023 | Pantaxa: Laiya | |
| 2024 | Rainbow Rumble | Contestant/Herself |

=== Microdrama ===
| Year | Title | Role |
|---|---|---|
| 2026 | OJT Hours of Love | Elaine |
