= Võta või jäta =

Estonian television series

Logo

Võta või jäta (English: Take or Leave) is the Estonian version of the game show Deal or No Deal, airing on Viasat's TV3 channel since 2007. Estonia is the first of the three Baltic States to obtain a version of the television program.

The host is Alari Kivisaar. The prizes originally went from as little as 10 senti (about €0.006 or $0.01) to as big as 250,000 Estonian krooni (about €16,000 or $21,000), but the money tree was changed in August 2007 and the prizes went from 1 sent (about €0.0006 or $0.001) to 1,000,000 krooni (about €63,900 or $85,000). The set is very similar to the US counterpart.

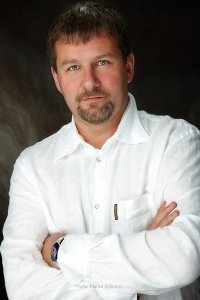
Alari Kivisaar

A new series was started on 8 March 2013 and is also hosted by Alari Kivisaar. The top prize is €100,000.

== Amount table ==
=== 2007 ===
0.10 EEK
0.50 EEK
1 EEK
3 EEK
5 EEK
10 EEK
25 EEK
50 EEK
100 EEK
200 EEK
300 EEK
400 EEK
500 EEK

1,000 EEK
2,500 EEK
5,000 EEK
7,500 EEK
10,000 EEK
20,000 EEK
30,000 EEK
40,000 EEK
50,000 EEK
75,000 EEK
100,000 EEK
150,000 EEK
250,000 EEK

=== 2007–2010 ===
0.01 EEK
0.50 EEK
1 EEK
5 EEK
10 EEK
25 EEK
50 EEK
75 EEK
100 EEK
200 EEK
300 EEK
400 EEK
500 EEK

1,000 EEK
2,500 EEK
5,000 EEK
10,000 EEK
20,000 EEK
30,000 EEK
40,000 EEK
50,000 EEK
100,000 EEK
150,000 EEK
300,000 EEK
500,000 EEK
1,000,000 EEK

=== NBC Around the World ===
$.01	$1,000
$1	$5,000
$5	$10,000
$10	$25,000
$25	$50,000
$50	$75,000
$75	$100,000
$100	$200,000
$200	$300,000
$300	$400,000
$400	$500,000
$500	$750,000
$750	$1,000,000

=== 2013 ===
€0.01
€0.10
€0.50
€1
€2
€5
€10
€15
€20
€30
€40
€50
€75

€100
€250
€500
€750
€1,000
€2,000
€3,000
€4,000
€5,000
€10,000
€25,000
€50,000
€100,000

== Deal or No Deal USA visits Estonia ==
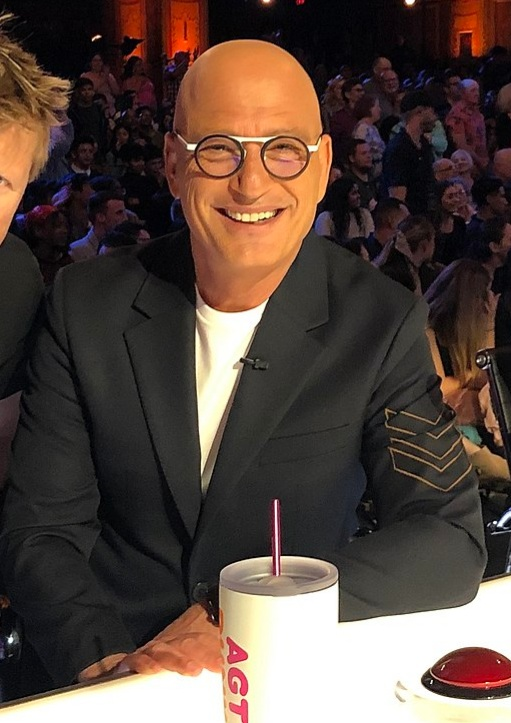
Howie Mandel

The US version of Deal or No Deal visited Estonia in early 2008, to tape a special episode as part of the show's ongoing World Tour. In this special edition, the show's studio, host and models are used; however, the on-screen graphics and audio cues were the American version's, added in the United States during post-production. Also, the game was played by American rules, using American money and contestants. Alari Kivisaar joined US host Howie Mandel as co-host. This special episode aired on the American NBC network on 7 May 2008. This stop was the first to be taped, but the Philippine stop was the first to air. It is unknown if TV3 will be airing this special episode.
