= Diego Gutierrez (Filipino entertainer) =

Filipino actor and singer

- Born: November 11, 1996 (age 29)
- Occupations: Singer, songwriter, actor, basketball player
- Years active: 2021–present
- Parent(s): Lotlot de Leon (mother); Ramon Christopher Gutierrez (father)
- Family: Gutierrez clan De Leon clan

Diego de Leon Gutierrez (born November 11, 1996) is a Filipino actor and singer.

== Early life and education ==
Gutierrez is the third of the four children, and only son, of actors Lotlot de Leon and Ramon Christopher. His older sister is actress Janine Gutierrez while his grandmother is singer Pilita Corrales. His parents separated in 2010. Growing up, he and his siblings were spared from their conflict. In 2018, he earned a degree in Bachelor of Arts in Integrated Marketing Communications from the University of Asia and the Pacific (UA&P) and was also the captain of their basketball varsity team.

== Career ==
Gutierrez first pursued a career in basketball. He joined the Quezon City Defenders, a NBL team which his mother and her husband Fadi El Soury later became the owners of.

In 2020, Gutierrez signed with to the same talent agency as his mother and sister Janine. On February 5, 2021, Gutierrez released his debut single "On A Dream", which he wrote during the COVID-19 pandemic with Erick Walls & Mark J. Feist and contains lyrics in both English and Filipino. He had previously been signed to the Los Angeles-based indie label Hitmakers Entertainment in 2019, but due to the pandemic, his time with them was cut short. He also joined the cast of the Sunday noontime variety show ASAP that year.

In 2022, Gutierrez released the single "Sino Na Tayo", his first song written in full Tagalog. The following year, he competed on Family Feud Philippines alongside his aunt Jackie Lou Blanco and her children. They won the ₱200,000 jackpot prize. Two years after releasing "Sino Na Tayo", he released "Hanggang Sa Dulo" on July 3, 2024, now under his new record distribution deal with Sony Music Philippines. In 2026, he was among the cast of 20 different celebrity contestants taking part in the ABS-CBN game show revival Kapamilya Deal or No Deal. Gutierrez was selected to play as contestant on the July 5 episode, where he unfortunately won the minimum ₱1 prize.

== Personal life ==
Gutierrez is in a relationship with Bea San Jose, who is also a UA&P alumna.

== Filmography ==
=== Television ===
Year	Title	Role	Notes	Source
2021–present	ASAP	Himself – Host / Performer		
2023	Regal Studio Presents	Basti	Episode: "Baddest Best Friend"	
2023	Family Feud Philippines	Himself		
2025	Rainbow Rumble	Himself		
2026	Kapamilya Deal or No Deal	Briefcase No. 12		

== Awards and nominations ==
Year	Nominated work	Award	Category	Result	Source
2024		Awit Awards	Best New Male Recording Artist	Won	

== Discography ==
=== Singles ===
==== As a lead artist ====
List of singles, showing year released, selected chart positions, and name of the album
Title	Year	Peak chart positions	Album
Title	Year	PHL	Album
"On a Dream"	2021	—	Non-album singles
"House of Tears"	2021	—	Non-album singles
"I Don't Think You Can"	2021	—	Non-album singles
"Sino Na Tayo"	2022	—	Non-album singles
"Hanggang Sa Dulo"	2024	—	Non-album singles
