= Pantaxa: Laiya =

Philippines erotic reality show

- Genre: Reality
- Presented by: Rose Van Ginkel; Wilbert Ross
- Country of origin: Philippines
- Original language: Filipino
- No. of episodes: 6

Production
- Production location: Laiya, Batangas
- Running time: 46–61 minutes

Original release
- Network: Vivamax
- Release: April 23 – May 27, 2023

Pantaxa: Laiya is the Philippines erotic reality show. The series is hosted by Rose Van Ginkel and Wilbert Ross along with Katya Santos and Maui Taylor as mentors that premiered on 23 April 2023 on Vivamax. Angelica Hart and Aiko Garcia emerged as the winner.

== Contestants ==
- Angelica Hart
- Audrey Avila
- Aiko Garcia
- Apple Dy
- Aria Bench
- Aila Cruz
- Armina Alegre
- Cess Garcia

== Crew ==
=== Host ===
- Rose Van Ginkel
- Wilbert Ross

=== Mentors ===
- Katya Santos
- Maui Taylor
- Pallab Das

=== Guest appearances ===
- Angeli Khang
- Ayanna Misola
- Massimo Scofield
- Nico Locco
- Yuki Sakamoto

== Episodes ==
No.	Title	Original release date	Prod. code
1	"Fulfill Your Fantasy"	23 April 2023	46 mins.
2	"Get Your Kinx on"	29 April 2023	46 mins.
3	"Wet and Wild"	6 May 2023	58 mins.
4	"Slippery When Wet"	13 May 2023	61 mins.
5	"Bed Scenes"	20 May 2023	55 mins.
6	"Crowning The Pantaxa"	27 May 2023	55 mins.

== Production ==
The series was announced on Vivamax consisting of six episodes. The principal photography of the series commenced in April 2023 in Laiya, Batangas with Rose Van Ginkel and Wilbert Ross joining as the host. The press conference for the series was held on April 14, 2023. The trailer of the series was released on April 12, 2023.
