= Sukdulan (2003 film) =

Filipino erotic drama film

- Directed by: Mac C. Alejandre
- Screenplay by: Edgar Ilao
- Story by: Edgar Ilao; Erik Matti (uncredited)
- Produced by: Vicente G. del Rosario III; Veronique Del Rosario-Corpus
- Starring: Katya Santos; Raymond Bagatsing; Carlo Maceda
- Cinematography: Miguel Fabie III
- Edited by: Danny C. Gloria
- Music by: Eazer Pastor
- Production company: Viva Films
- Distributed by: Viva Films
- Release date: January 29, 2003
- Country: Philippines
- Language: Filipino

Sukdulan (lit. 'Extremity') is a 2003 erotic drama film directed by Mac C. Alejandre from a script by Edgar Ilao and starring Katya Santos, Raymond Bagatsing and Carlo Maceda. About a tollbooth operator (Santos) who seeks to leave her husband (Bagatsing) for the love of a construction worker (Maceda), the film was produced by Viva Films and released in theaters on January 29, 2003.

== Cast ==
- Katya Santos as Elaine
- Raymond Bagatsing as Orly
- Carlo Maceda as Miguel
- Bobby Andrews as Roy
- Daria Ramirez as Inta
- Kristine Jaca as Marge
- Cheska Garcia as Claire
- Jim Pebanco as Carding
- Kathy Arguelles as Lumen
- Nanding Josef as pastor
- Harold Macasero as a "tambay" (lit. 'bystander')
- Ardi Aquino as husband
- Gwen Garci
- Hazel Ann Cabrera
- Randy Punsal
- Jerry Sabater as foreman
- Danilo Zacarias as a "tambay"
- James Ryan as Miguel's buddy
- Nick Alcantara as Miguel's buddy
- Pinky Amador as Vivian
- Christian Vasquez as Miguel's buddy
- Cholo Escaño as Miguel's buddy
- Alex Sabater as a "tambay"

== Production ==
Actresses who were previously considered for the lead role in Sukdulan included Lorna Tolentino, Assunta de Rossi and Angelu de Leon. Katya Santos, the fourth choice, had finished taking a break from show business to finish her college degree in Business Administration when she accepted the role. Her decision to star in Sukdulan was to veer away from her "wholesome image" and become a more recognizable actress to audiences. She had previously rejected offers from Viva Films to star in Scorpio Nights 2, Tatarin and Balahibong Pusa due to her being underage when the roles were offered.

Santos and Raymond Bagatsing attended an acting workshop before starting production on the film.

== Release ==
Sukdulan was released in theaters on January 29, 2003.

=== Home media ===
In 2021, the film was made available for streaming on Vivamax, where it reached the top ten chart for the most-viewed films on the site within a few months after the site was launched.
