= Kool Ka Lang =

Philippine television sitcom series

- Title card
- Also known as: Kool Ka Lang, Oo Naman
- Genre: Sitcom
- Directed by: Ipe Pelino; Al Tantay
- Starring: Raymart Santiago
- Country of origin: Philippines
- Original language: Tagalog

Production
- Executive producer: Redgie Acuña-Magno
- Camera setup: Multiple-camera setup
- Running time: 39–57 minutes
- Production company: GMA Entertainment TV

Original release
- Network: GMA Network
- Release: October 19, 1998 – October 13, 2003

Kool Ka Lang (transl. just be cool) is a Philippine television sitcom series broadcast by GMA Network. Starring Raymart Santiago, it premiered on October 19, 1998 on the network's KiliTV line up replacing Ibang Klase. The series concluded on October 13, 2003.

The series is streaming online on YouTube.

== Cast and characters ==
Cast

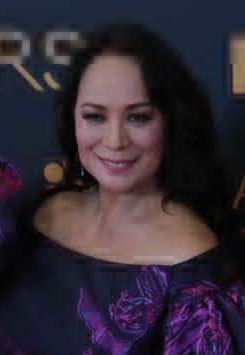
Gloria Diaz

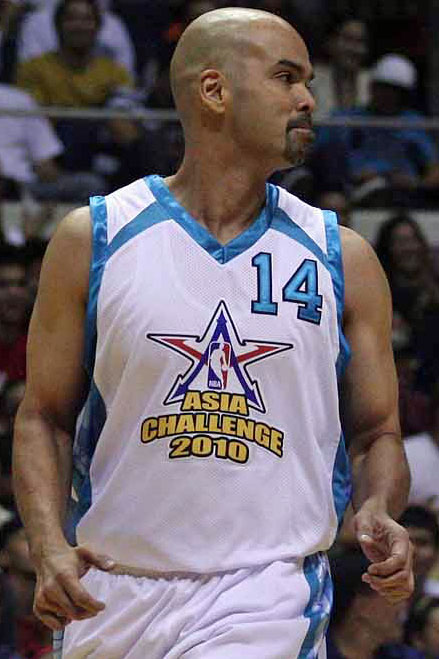
Benjie Paras

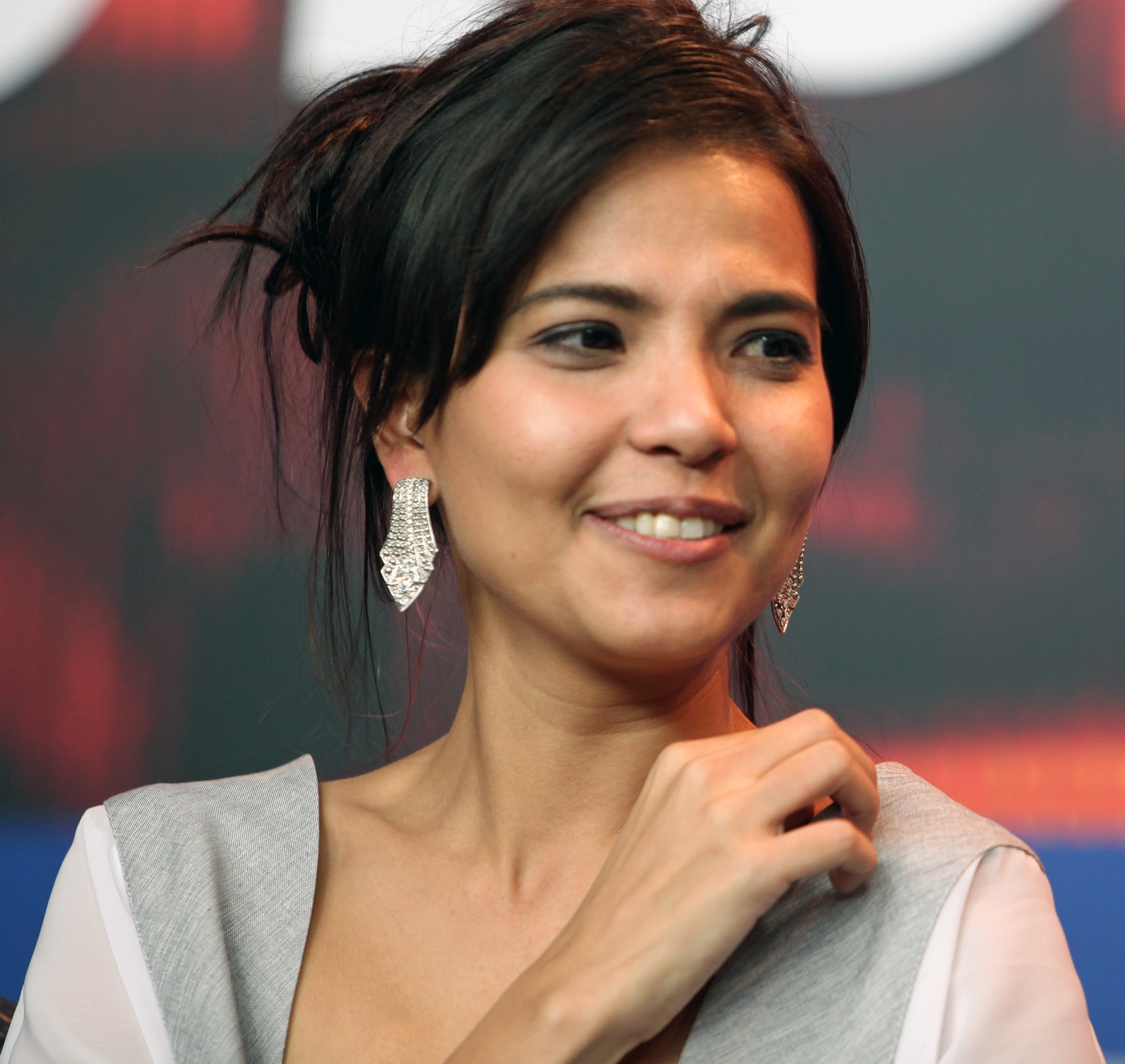
Alessandra De Rossi

Lead cast

- Raymart Santiago as Jack Mangalikot
- Bonel Balingit as Empoy Mangalikot
- Joey Marquez as Magdaleno "Mags" Magdangal

Supporting cast

- LJ Moreno as Gina
- Gloria Diaz as Nadya
- Blakdyak as Uling
- Maureen Larrazabal as Maina
- Robert "Long" Mejia as Long
- Rufa Mae Quinto as Teenie
- Dagul as himself
- Jomari Yllana as Bal
- Benjie Paras as Jie
- Alessandra De Rossi as Maji Magdangal
- Maui Taylor as Waikiki
- Dennis Padilla as Gancho
- Isko Salvador as Clinton
- Mark Wilson as Pot-pot
