= Reynaldo Aguinaldo =

Filipino politician (1946–2019)

Reynaldo B. Aguinaldo

Mayor of Kawit
- In office June 30, 2007 – June 30, 2016
- Preceded by: Federico Poblete
- Succeeded by: Angelo Emilio Aguinaldo

Vice Mayor of Kawit
- In office June 30, 1998 – June 30, 2007

Personal details
- Born: September 28, 1946
- Died: March 24, 2019 (aged 72)
- Party: Liberal (2007–2019); Partido Magdalo (local party; 1998–2019)
- Other party: LDP (1998–2007)

Reynaldo Bautista Aguinaldo (September 28, 1946 – March 24, 2019) was a Filipino politician who served as mayor of Kawit, Cavite from 2007 to 2016. He had previously served as vice mayor for three consecutive terms, from 1998 to 2007.

Aguinaldo was a grandson (son of Emilio Aguinaldo, Jr.) of Emilio Aguinaldo, the first President of the Philippines.

He died from a cardiac arrest on March 24, 2019.
