= Lolong (TV series) =

Philippine television drama series

- Season 2 title card
- Also known as: Crocodile Whisperer; Crocodile Whisperer Book 2; Lolong: Bayani ng Bayan (Note: Season 2 (2025).); Lolong: Pangil ng Maynila
- Genre: Adventure; Action drama
- Created by: Jessica Soho; Lee Joseph Castel
- Directed by: Rommel P. Penesa
- Starring: Ruru Madrid
- Theme music composer: Ann Margaret R. Figueroa; Rico Blanco
- Ending theme: "Para sa Pangarap" by Hannah Prescillas; "214" by Jeremiah Tiangco
- Country of origin: Philippines
- Original language: Tagalog
- No. of seasons: 2
- No. of episodes: 167

Production
- Executive producers: Eunice F. Mandia; Mark Anthony B. Norella; John Gary Criel J. Candelaria
- Production locations: Quezon, Philippines
- Editors: Tricia Senia; Jhoan Longboy; Kim Badayos
- Camera setup: Multiple-camera setup
- Running time: 25–43 minutes
- Production company: GMA Public Affairs

Original release
- Network: GMA Network
- Release: July 4, 2022 – June 13, 2025

Lolong (international title: Crocodile Whisperer / Crocodile Whisperer Book 2 ) is a Philippine television drama action series broadcast by GMA Network. Directed by Rommel P. Penesa, it stars Ruru Madrid in the title role. It premiered on July 4, 2022, on the network's Telebabad line up. The series concluded on June 13, 2025, with a total of two seasons and 167 episodes.

The series is streaming online on YouTube.

== Cast and characters ==
Cast

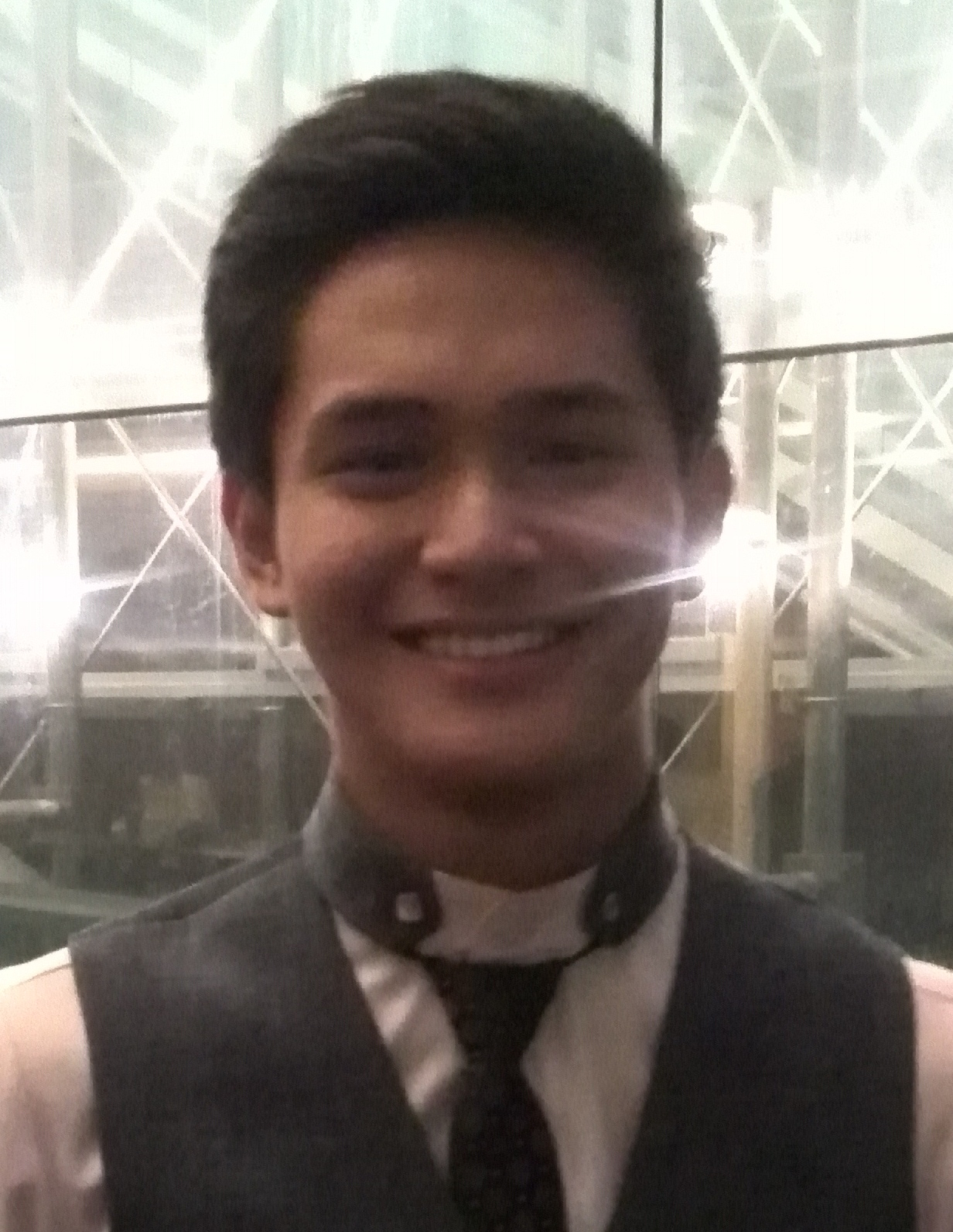
Ruru Madrid

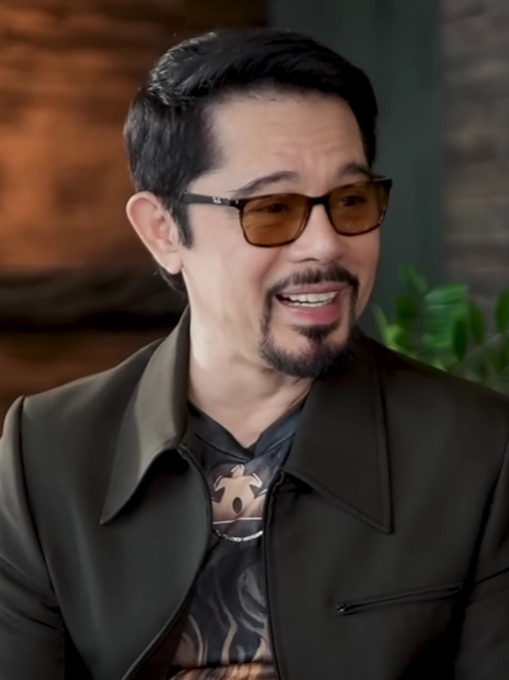
Christopher de Leon

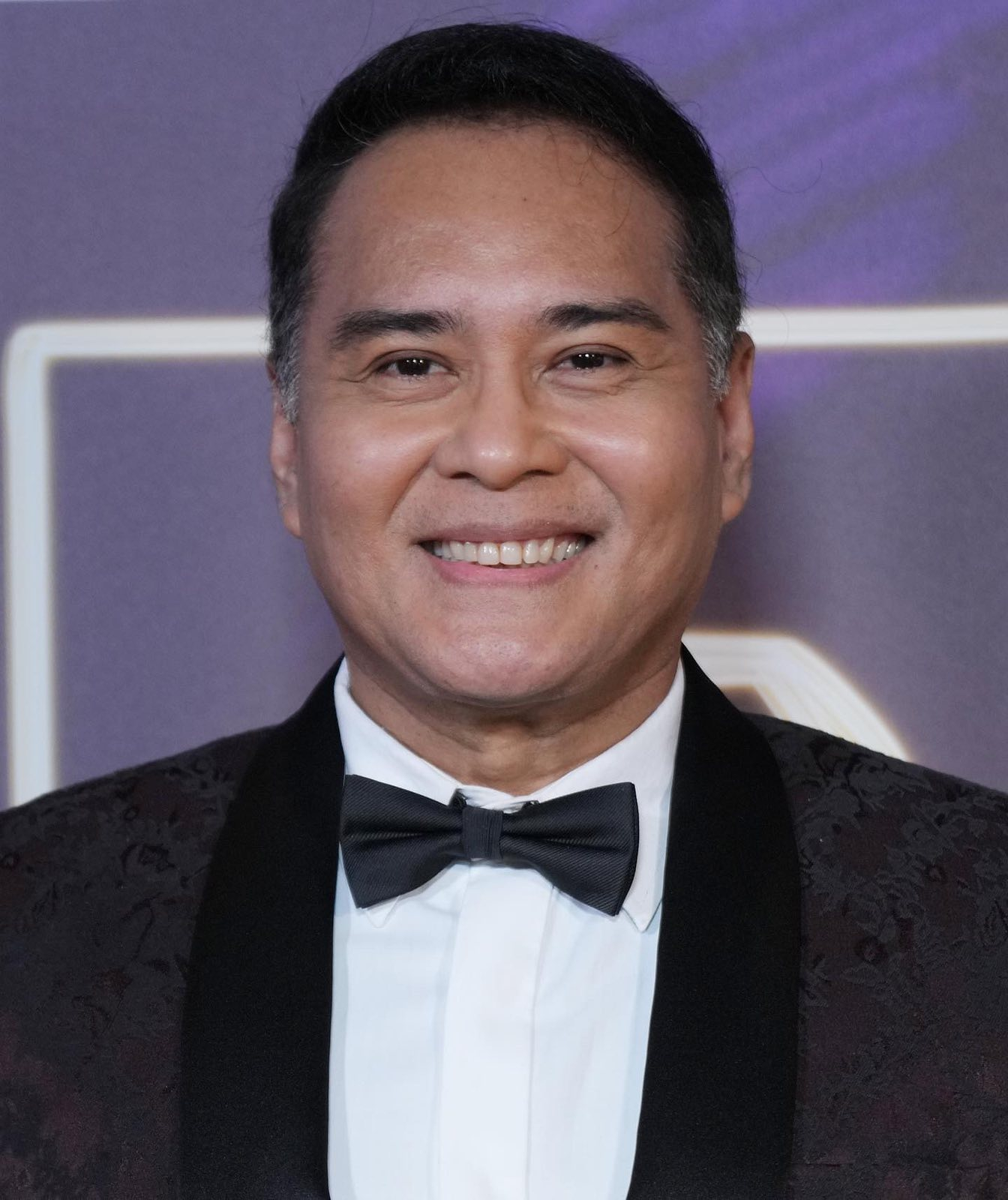
John Arcilla

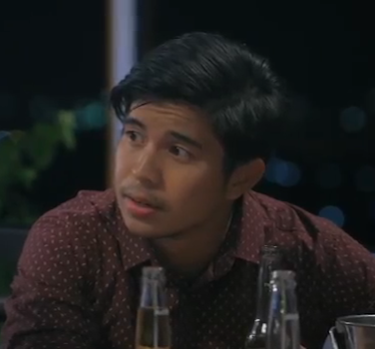
Rodjun Cruz

Lead cast

- Ruru Madrid as Rolando "Lolong" Candelaria

Supporting cast

- Christopher de Leon (season 1) as Armando Banson
- Jean Garcia as Donatella "Dona" Banson
- Shaira Diaz as Elsie Dominguez
- Arra San Agustin (season 1) as Isabella "Bella" Melendez
- Paul Salas as Martin Candelaria / Martin Banson
- Rochelle Pangilinan as Karina Marabe
- Bembol Roco (season 1) as Narciso "Narsing" Candelaria
- Malou de Guzman (season 1) / Tetchie Agbayani (season 2) as Isabel
- Mikoy Morales as Victoriano "Bokyo" Dela Cruz
- Ian de Leon (season 1) as Lucas Morales
- DJ Durano (season 1) as Alberto "Abet" Dominguez
- Marco Alcaraz (season 1) as Marco Mendrano
- Maui Taylor as Dolores Baticusin
- Alma Concepcion as Ines Candelaria
- John Arcilla (season 2) as Julio Figueroa
- Martin del Rosario (season 2) as Ivan
- Nonie Buencamino as Nando
- Leo Martinez (season 2) as Kanor
- Rocco Nacino (season 2) as Flavio Elustrisimo
- Klea Pineda (season 2) as Laya
- Victor Neri (season 2) as Dominador Innocenio
- Rodjun Cruz (season 2) as Bungo
- Nikki Valdez (season 2) as Jessabel Hermosa-Calaycay
- Pancho Magno (season 2) as Franco
- Bernadette Allyson (season 2) as Anna
- Boom Labrusca (season 2) as Jose Dela Vega
- Michael Roy Jornales (season 2) as Leo
- Rob Sy (season 2) as Khaleed
- Jan Marini (season 2) as Jopay dela Cruz
- Gerard Pizarras (season 2) as Joshua dela Cruz
- Tanya Gomez (season 2) as Chona
- Archi Adamos (season 2) as Delfin
- Rubi Rubi (season 2) as Auring
- Karenina Haniel (season 2) as Wenggay
- Via Antonio (season 2) as Joy
- John Clifford (season 2) as Ricky
- Waynona Collings (season 2) as Rain
- Inah Evans (season 2) as Cinderella
- Nikko Natividad (season 2) as Hudas
- Nicco Manalo (season 2) as Boy Kamot
- Joe Vargas (season 2) as Tisoy
- Barbingot Forteza (season 2)
- Jennie Gabriel (season 2) as Roxie
- Saviour Ramos (season 2) as Wowie
- Kate Yalung (season 2) as Mila
- Jim Pebanco (season 2) as Nunez
- Drey Lampago (season 2) as Tres
- Ryrie Sophia (season 2) as Gelai
- Aljohn Banaira (season 2) as Memot

Guest cast

- Leandro Baldemor as Raul Candelaria
- Priscilla Almeda as Gloria Candelaria
- Pokwang as Coring
- Sue Prado as Riza dela Torre
- Luke Conde as Benjo Dominguez
- Vin Abrenica as Diego
- Thea Tolentino as Celia
- Lucho Ayala as Victor
- Rafael Rosell as Reyes
- Ryan Eigenmann as Delfin
- Mon Confiado as Luciano
- Michelle Dee (season 2) as Apo Ayong
- Vangie Labalan (season 2) as Tonette
- Juancho Trivino (season 2) as Hector
- Chai Fonacier (season 2) as Mercy
- Marcus Madrigal (season 2) as Tigreal
- Kim Perez (season 2) as Miyo
- Don Umali (season 2) as Alex
- Tessie Tomas as Grasya
- Rowell Santiago as Manuel Magtalas
- Elle Villanueva as Tamara "Tetet" Melendez
- Vaness del Moral as Ester
- Yasser Marta as George "Goryo" Figueroa
- Ketchup Eusebio as Badong
- Matt Lozano as Benjamin "Benjo" Mendrano
- Wendell Ramos as Pacquito Magtalas
- Sienna Stevens as Mimay
- Geleen Eugenio as Divina
- Michael Flores as Carlos Elustrisimo
- Erlinda Villalobos as Teodora
- Leonida Aguinaldo as Susie

== Seasons ==
| Season | Episodes | Originally released | |
| Season | Episodes | First released | Last released |
|---|---|---|---|
| 1 | 65 | July 4, 2022 | September 30, 2022 |
| 2 | 102 | January 20, 2025 | June 13, 2025 |

== Development ==
Broadcast journalist Jessica Soho came up with the series' concept of conflict between humans and a crocodile, which was featured in her show Kapuso Mo, Jessica Soho. Lolong is named after a crocodile of the same name, which was known as the world's largest crocodile in captivity. A 6.7 meters (22 ft) long animatronic, enhanced by computer-generated imagery was used to depict the crocodile "Dakila".

=== Casting ===
In October 2020, Philippine actress Sanya Lopez left the series due to joining the drama series First Yaya. Kim Domingo was also initially attached to appear in the series. For the second season, the cast members were announced on October 25, 2024.

== Production ==
Principal photography for the first season commenced in July 2021 in Quezon. It was halted in August 2021 due to the enhanced community quarantine in National Capital Region caused by the COVID-19 pandemic. Filming resumed in January 2022. For the second season, principal photography for commenced in November 2024 and concluded in June 2025.

== Ratings ==
According to AGB Nielsen Philippines' Nationwide Urban Television Audience Measurement People in television homes, the pilot episode of Lolong earned a 17.7% rating. The season one finale scored a 19.3% rating. The season two premiere achieved a 10.8% rating. The season two finale scored a 10.2% rating.

== Accolades ==
Accolades received by Lolong
| Year | Award | Category | Recipient | Result | Ref. |
|---|---|---|---|---|---|
| 2022 | Gawad Pilipino Awards | Best Primetime Series | Lolong | Won | |
| 2022 | Asian Academy Creative Awards | Best Visual or Special FX (TV or Feature Film) | Lolong | Won | |
