= The Aguinaldos =

Mother-and-son content creator duo

- Born: Leonida Aguinaldo; Lester Aguinaldo Abion
- Years active: 2019–present
- Known for: Viral family comedy skits

TikTok information
- Page: The Aguinaldos
- Followers: 1.8 million

YouTube information
- Channel: The Aguinaldos
- Years active: 2015–present
- Subscribers: 97.4 thousand
- Views: 26.6 million
- Last updated: November 18, 2026

The Aguinaldos are a Filipino mother-and-son content creator duo composed of Leonida Aguinaldo Abion (also known as "Nanay Ganda" or "Mommy Ganda" ) and her son Lester Aguinaldo Abion (also known as "Bunso"). They are known for producing comedic and prank-oriented online content on social media platforms such as Facebook and TikTok, often centered on family interactions and relatable everyday situations. Their content gained significant popularity during the COVID-19 pandemic, leading to viral videos and a growing online following.

== Background ==
Before becoming full-time content creators, Lester worked as a licensed architect. He later began creating online content in 2019 after losing his job as a form of personal outlet during stressful work conditions. During the COVID-19 pandemic, he experienced job loss, which led him to focus more on content creation. Eventually, he began involving his mother in his videos, forming the mother-and-son tandem now known as The Aguinaldos. The duo rose to prominence in 2022 following the viral "scholarship prank" video, which featured candid reactions from his parents.

== Career ==
=== Content creation ===
The Aguinaldos produce comedic skits, pranks, and slice-of-life videos centered on family interactions. Their early earnings from content creation reportedly began at around ₱10,000, eventually growing to six-digit income as their online presence expanded.

As of 2026, they have amassed approximately 2.9 million followers on Facebook, 1.6 million followers on TikTok, and around 88,500 subscribers on YouTube.

=== Brand ambassadorship ===
The Aguinaldos have partnered with brands such as Sensodyne and Polident, serving as ambassadors and collaborating on sponsored content.

== Television and media appearances ==
=== Events ===
The Aguinaldos attended the GMA Gala 2025 held at the Marriott Hotel in August 2025, where they met several Kapuso artists, including Alden Richards and Marian Rivera.

=== Game and talk shows ===
In April 2024, The Aguinaldos appeared as guests on the ABS-CBN talk show Magandang Buhay, where they discussed their experiences as content creators and their family dynamic as a mother-and-son tandem.

On August 7, 2025, The Aguinaldos appeared as contestants on the It's Showtime segment MASAsagot Mo Ba? as Team Aguinaldo where they competed against the Whamonette Family, led by Whamos Cruz. Team Aguinaldo advanced to the jackpot round, where they answered all three questions perfectly and won ₱50,000. During their appearance on It's Showtime, Nanay Leonida went viral after mistakenly calling Jackie Gonzaga "Kim Chiu." She also jokingly shouted at Jhong Hilario during the game, adding to the comedic moment that drew attention online. On October 21, 2026, they performed on It's Showtime for its 17th anniversary celebration.

They also appeared in Family Feud as contestants. In one episode, they participated in gameplay segments alongside other teams and later won ₱100,000. They also featured in an online exclusive segment of Family Feud where Nanay Ganda interacted with host Dingdong Dantes.

=== Acting ===
Leonida Aguinaldo Abion appeared in the television series Lolong: Pangil ng Maynila, where she portrayed the character Aling Susie, a comedic sari-sari store owner.

=== News magazine shows ===
The Aguinaldos was featured on an episode of Tao Po! in May 2024 where they shared their experiences before becoming content creators.

On January 19, 2025, The Aguinaldos were featured on the magazine news program Kapuso Mo, Jessica Soho, where they discussed their experiences as content creators. During the feature, they also showcased their under-construction house funded through their vlogging activities. In one segment, Nanay Ganda was given a brief hosting moment and delivered the program’s signature line, "i-KMJS na 'yan!" they also have her a surprise birthday segment, which included a staged appearance of an impersonator of Jessica Soho, followed by a video greeting from the real Jessica Soho wishing her a happy birthday.

== Filmography ==
=== Television appearances ===
Year	Title	Role	Notes	Ref.
2022	Eat Bulaga!	Himself (Lester)	Contestant	
2023	E.A.T.	Themselves	Invited audience for pilot episode of E.A.T.	
2023	Tropang LOL	Themselves	Contestants	
2024	Magandang Buhay	Themselves	Guests	
2024	Tao Po!	Themselves	Featured guests	
2025	Family Feud	Themselves	Contestants	
2025	Kapuso Mo, Jessica Soho	Themselves	Featured guests	
2025	Lolong: Pangil ng Maynila	Aling Susie	Only Leonida Abion	
2025	It's Showtime	Themselves	Contestants	
2026	Kapamilya, Deal or No Deal	Themselves	Lucky stars	
2026	It's Showtime	Themselves	Guests	
