= List of Sine Novela episodes =

This is the list of episodes of GMA Network's daytime drama Sine Novela.

== Sine Novela episodes ==
=== Season 1 ===
==== Sinasamba Kita ====
Air date	April 30 to July 27, 2007
English Title	All For You
Synopsis	They are half-sisters, connected by blood. But to Divina, Nora is just her late father's illegitimate daughter. Yet, despite the harsh treatment she gets, Nora remains awestruck and continues to adulate her strong-willed older sister. But even the meekest of people can only bear so much. Nora leaves the comfort of home to find her own place under the sun, and in due time, she and Divina are to meet again to settle the score once and for all.
Director	Joel Lamangan
Writer(s)	Don Michael Perez
Cast	Sheryl Cruz, Wendell Ramos, Carlo Aquino and Valerie Concepcion

==== Pati Ba Pintig ng Puso ====
Air date	May 21 to September 7, 2007
English Title	Of Love and Lies
Synopsis	When Aldrin returns from the States, everyone is as ecstatic as his grandfather. But his reason for going home is not because of his grandfather but his sister Mabel, who is in an asylum. His vow is to take her away from their grandfather who caused the early death of their parents. To avenge for what happened to his family, Aldrin plans a final revenge and that's when Jenna comes into his life. But Aldrin refused to marry Agatha the girl who his grandfather wants him to marry because he loves Jenna.
Director	Gil Tejada
Writer(s)	Kit Villanueva-Langit
Cast	JC de Vera and Yasmien Kurdi

==== Kung Mahawi Man ang Ulap ====
Air date	July 30 to November 9, 2007
English Title	Through It All
Synopsis	Catherine goes through all the travails of a young woman, who had to deal with her first love Stan, her vulnerable mother, her mother's scheming new husband, and his equally money-hungry family who are out to dupe her of her inheritance.
Director	Mac Alejandre
Writer(s)	Des Garbes-Severino
Cast	Dennis Trillo, Iwa Moto and Nadine Samonte

==== Pasan Ko ang Daigdig ====
Air date	September 10, 2007, to January 11, 2008
English Title	The World is On My Shoulder
Synopsis	Lupe is born into poverty but her dreams are for a better life. She cares for her crippled mother who is also her harshest critic. Poor, crippled persons normally engender feelings of pity, but Lupe's mother adds to the burden and is the metaphor that represents the title of the movie—Lupe carries her mother on her back as she begs for alms.
Director	Joel Lamangan
Writer(s)	Kit Villanueva-Langit
Cast	JC de Vera, Yasmien Kurdi and Gina Alajar

=== Season 2 ===
==== My Only Love ====
Air date	November 12, 2007, to February 29, 2008
Synopsis	They are teenagers trapped in the conflicted world of their parents. Two children of two marriages gone sour. Young and confused by the whole situation, they try to look for answers, but the whole business of life is not as simple as it seems. Left with no choice but to come to terms with whatever it is that life presents, they rely on each other for emotional support. And in the process, they learn that despite their parents marital woes, much remains in life and love reserved for the two of them.
Director	Louie Ignacio
Writer(s)	Des Garbes-Severino
Cast	Mark Herras, Bianca King and Rhian Ramos

==== Maging Akin Ka Lamang ====
Air date	January 21 to May 9, 2008
English Title	Till You Are Mine
Synopsis	The story unveils the intertwined lives of four people: Elsa Paruel (Nadine Samonte), a travel agent; Andy Abrigo (Polo Ravales), an ambitious & business-minded OFW architect; Rosita Monteverde (Isabel Oli), a wealthy brat; and Ernie Balboa (Carlo Aquino), a businessman. Elsa is an orphan working as a travel agent when she accidentally meets Andy, with whom she instantly falls in love. But rich heiress Rosita, Andy's childhood friend who is obsessed with him, will do everything to have the architect for herself. Rosita seduces him and they have a one-night stand. When Rosita's father, Augusto (Juan Rodrigo), finds out about his daughter's affair with Andy, his secretary's son, he sends Andy abroad. Afraid that Don Augusto will fire his mom Aida (Dexter Doria) from work, Andy has no choice but to go, leaving Elsa heartbroken. But true love can wait. After five years, Andy returns and rekindles his romance with Elsa and eventually gets married. Andy and Elsa's marriage leaves Rosita devastated and vengeful. Using her wealth and even her family friend Ernie, who is obsessed with her, Rosita steals Elsa's baby and makes it appear that the child died at birth. This leaves Elsa and Andy distraught. After several years, Rosita comes back with Elsa's child who she has named Adrian (Jacob Tingson). Is stealing Elsa's child enough to end Rosita's vengeance? Or is it just the start of her never-ending revenge and fury? And what if Elsa discovers her obsession; will she remain true and just to Andy? Is Andy's great love for Elsa enough to protect his family from Rosita's wrath? And will Ernie be able to find his much-needed space in Rosita's heart? Or will he just end up being the big loser Things are working out for Rosita as she uses the child against Andy and Elsa but the tables are about to turn on her when Andy's Best friend Rick (Mike Tan) arrived from the States and told Andy that he saw Rosita left the country with a baby that Rosita claimed to him as her nephew also at the same time that he left the country for the States as well, this revelation made Andy felt that the child Rosita introduced to him and Elsa is their child since he knew that Rosita is an only child so it's impossible for her to have a nephew or a niece & at that same time Andy realized that the rumors spreading that Rosita stole their child is true.
Director	Gil Tejada Jr.
Writer(s)	Kit Villanueva-Langit
Cast	Nadine Samonte, Isabel Oli, Polo Ravales and Carlo Aquino

==== Kaputol ng Isang Awit ====
Air date	March 3 to June 13, 2008
English Title	The Other End of a Song; "Unsung Melody" (International title)
Synopsis	When Eric discovers the potential of Sarah as a solo performer, will he also discover a new love in her? Seeing Sarah as a threat to her love and career, what schemes will Joanna use to destroy her competition? Meanwhile, when Marco realizes that the woman he loves is in love with someone else, will he give in and accept defeat? Or will he connive to get what he wants? And what fate does the mysterious—and unfinished—music sheet keep secret for the four main characters?
Director	Mike Tuviera
Writer(s)	Des Garbes-Severino
Cast	Glaiza de Castro, Lovi Poe, Marky Cielo and Jolo Revilla

==== Magdusa Ka ====
Air date	May 12 to August 29, 2008
English Title	Misery
Synopsis	Christine has lived a life of poverty with her mother. She dreams that she will have a better life than the one she has right now. So when she discovers that her father is very much alive and very rich, unlike her mother's story whom she says he's already dead, she slowly creeps to the lives of his father's new family, inching her way slowly to the top. But when her plan backfires on her, she realizes she already gave up a lot just for her blind ambition.
Director	Maryo J. de los Reyes
Writer(s)	Aloy Adlawan
Cast	Katrina Halili, Iwa Moto and Dennis Trillo

=== Season 3 ===
==== Gaano Kadalas ang Minsan ====
Air date	June 23 to November 7, 2008
English Title	Love Me Again
Synopsis	They are two women in love with one man. One is the wife, the other is the mistress. And between them, the man whose love and time they share. But even the most discreet of affairs can be laid open, and the most submissive of wives can lose her patience.
Director	Gil Tejada Jr.
Writer(s)	Don Michael Perez
Cast	Camille Prats, Diana Zubiri and Marvin Agustin

==== Una Kang Naging Akin ====
Air date	September 1 to December 19, 2008
English Title	When You Were Mine
Synopsis	Nick is a rich businessman about to be married to Manila socialite, Vanessa when a plane crash suddenly changes his life, although he escaped death, he cannot remember anything! Jessa is an artist whose past failed relationship have made her cynical. Her love for art shows in her beautiful masterpieces. Then fate leads them to each other and, although Nick is in his vulnerable state, Jessa falls in love with him even though she knows the consequences of getting in this complicated situation. But her worst fears has come sooner than expected and now she must fight heaven and earth to get him back even if it seems she's at the losing end.
Director	Joel Lamangan
Writer(s)	Kit Villanueva-Langit
Cast	Angelika dela Cruz, Maxene Magalona and Wendell Ramos

==== Saan Darating ang Umaga? ====
Air date	November 10, 2008, to February 27, 2009
English Title	Morning Awaits
Synopsis	The story is about the Rodrigo clan led by the powerful patriarch Don Leonardo Rodrigo. Don Leonardo is a wealthy businessman who is very proud of his humble beginnings. It was only through hard work and diligence that he was able to achieve all the luxuries in life. Today, he is one of the most respected and well known businessmen in the real estate business. And because of this he also expects his two sons to Dindo Rodrigo and Ruben Rodrigo to follow his lead. Dindo and Ruben are architects working for their father's company. But it was Ruben who took after his father's ideals and compassion for the business. Not only is he talented but he is kind-hearted. He is a loving husband to Lorrie Rodrigo and a caring father to his daughter Shayne Rodrigo . Dindo, meanwhile, is the opposite of Ruben. He and his evil wife Agatha Rodrigo are very dependent and still live with Leonardo. Aside from not having a child, Dindo has been rumored for having an extramarital affair with his secretary Marinel "Mylene" Medina. When Don Leonardo passes away, the Rodrigo patriarch leaves all his wealth as well as the firm to Ruben. But unknown to Ruben, his father's last will marks the beginning of a series of misfortune in their family. Ruben and Lorrie have been longing to have another child since their only daughter Shayne is already a teenager. However, they will find out that Lorrie can no longer bear a child, leading them to adopt a young boy named Joel Rodrigo. Joel's presence provides an overwhelming happiness to Lorrie and Ruben. But it will be the beginning of Shayne's rebellion when she begins to feel neglected. Shayne will then meet Raul Agoncillo who will give her the attention she has been looking for from her parents. Ruben and Lorrie try to mend back their family. Just when they thought it's going to be alright again, tragedy struck. As Ruben died Lorrie became mentally unstable and she blames Joel for her husband's death. Shayne must then make a painful decision. Should she take Joel back to the orphanage? Especially now she has learned to love the child as his brother.
Director	Maryo J. De Los Reyes
Writer(s)	Des Garbes-Severino
Cast	Yasmien Kurdi, Dion Ignacio, Lani Mercado, Joel Torre and Jacob Rica

==== Paano Ba ang Mangarap? ====
Air date	February 16 to June 5, 2009
English Title	Without Your Love
Synopsis	Despite their different social backgrounds, Lisa and Benny have found their match in each other. Unfortunately, Benny dies before they could marry, and Lisa is left with no choice but to seek the help of Benny's parents. But their arrogance is as lofty as their fortune, and to them, Lisa is nothing but an opportunist. Their only concern is their late son's unborn child that Lisa is carrying in her womb. The only person who treats Liza with kindness is Eric, Benny's brother, who has secretly fallen in love with her...
Director	Joel Lamangan
Writer(s)	Aloy Adlawan
Cast	Jennylyn Mercado and Mark Herras

=== Season 4 ===
==== Dapat Ka Bang Mahalin? ====
Air date	March 2 to June 19, 2009
English Title	Second Chances
Synopsis	The series begins with Myrna Ramos falling in love with her classmate, Miguelito "Lito" Sanchez. Soon, Myrna's father discovered Myrna and Lito's relationship and he quickly tears their relationship apart. But still, Myrna and Lito still dated each other secretly. Soon, Lito proposes to marry Myrna. Myrna agrees and they are married. But they faces a lot of problems after getting married. Lito mostly spends time with his friends and he falls in love with Glacilda Bautista. Glacilda would cause trouble for Lito and Myrna's relationship. Meanwhile, Myrna also mostly hang out with friends and she became best friends with the handsome and kind Kiko Claro. It causes a threat for Lito since he thinks Kiko and Myrna have a love relationship.
Director	Maryo J. Delos Reyes
Writer(s)	Don Michael Perez
Cast	Aljur Abrenica and Kris Bernal

==== Ngayon at Kailanman ====
Air date	June 8 to September 25, 2009
English Title	Until Forever
Synopsis	The story begins in Hacienda Noche where Ayra Noche and Edwin Torres are best friends. Later on, they develop a love relationship. When Ayra's father, Don Artemyo finds out about this, the two are separated and Don Artemyo forced Ayra to move to United States. When Ayra returns, she finds out that Don Artemyo died and Ayra's brother, Ronald blames Edwin for it. Ayra listens to Ronald. Ayra also finds out that Edwin became the new owner of Hacienda Noche after Don Artemyo's death. Ayra and Edwin become big time rivals. Ayra wants the Hacienda back but Edwin says no. What makes this really worse is that Edwin has a new girlfriend named Donna Benitez. Donna feels hatred for Ayra and comes up with schemes for Ayra and Edwin. But soon, Edwin tricks Ayra into loving him. Will Ayra and Edwin ever get reunited? Will Ayra get the Hacienda back? Will Ayra and Edwin survive the schemes of Donna?
Director	Mike Tuviera
Writer(s)	Kit Villanueva-Langit
Cast	JC de Vera and Heart Evangelista

==== Kung Aagawin Mo ang Lahat sa Akin ====
Air date	June 22 to September 25, 2009
English Title	When All Is Gone
Synopsis	Don Gilbert Andrada and his wife Dona Clara Andrada always wanted to have children. But due to Dona Clara's heart problem, conceiving a child would prove fatal for her. One stormy night, a mysterious woman gave two baby girls to Don Gilbert in a relief operation. He named them Maureen and Mercedita. Don Gilbert arranged the papers so the children would be legally theirs. But Dona Clara cannot accept the children. She said they are not hers. She became pregnant with Don Gilbert, he tried to convince her to abort but she didn't agree. Surprisingly, she actually survived the pregnancy and bore a baby girl named Gladys despite being Don Gilbert's real child Both Maureen and Mercedita's became closer to Don Gilbert because of their good and studious attitude because of this Gladys always envied her sisters because of their father's attention. She tormented her sisters, while Dona Clara encourages her to maltreat them even more. She was encouraged even more when she learned that they were adopted and she's the only real daughter. Gladys cannot comprehend why everything she wanted falls to Maureen, so she tries to ruin Maureen's life with schemes, try to get Maureen's love away from her and use Mercedita against her own sister. Gladys tries to take away everything from her sister, but unknown to herself, she is only taking away her own joy and happiness. Then, Maureen falls in love with her classmate Arvin Samaniego. But, when Don Gilbert discovers Maureen and Arvin's relationship, the two where separated. Arvin tries to bring back Maureen but she refuses to love him. Meanwhile, Gladys has a crush on Arvin and tries to steal Arvin but was unsuccessful. Now these questions remain: Will Gladys take everything from Maureen? Will Arvin persuade Maureen to love him again with their parents around? Will Mercedita reunite with Maureen again? Will the Andrada family survive the obstacles coming in their way?
Director	Topel Lee and Rommel Gacho
Writer(s)	Des Garbes-Severino
Cast	Maxene Magalona, Glaiza de Castro, JC Tiuseco and Patrick Garcia

==== Kaya Kong Abutin ang Langit ====
Air date	September 28, 2009, to February 5, 2010
English Title	Selfish Desires
Synopsis	How much are you willing to gamble for your dreams. For Clarissa, it is everything. Born in destitution, she has always wanted to be rich and get out of the miserable life they have. She will use everything in her arsenal to gain the favor of her philanthropic god mother and to outsmart the people in the company that mock her abilities. She will climb the ladder of success but fails to realize that she has begun to abandon the people that love her. When her sudden fall comes, she realizes there is nobody there to catch her.
Director	Topel Lee and Soxie Topacio
Writer(s)	Aloy Adlawan
Cast	Iza Calzado, Wendell Ramos and Angelika dela Cruz

==== Tinik sa Dibdib ====
Air date	September 28, 2009, to January 22, 2010
English Title	Thorns In the Heart
Synopsis	This is a searing drama about a young woman Lorna (Sunshine Dizon/Nadine Samonte) who was married to escape from her family of parasites only to find herself in a worse situation. Her husband's Lando (Marvin Agustin) family included a mentally disturbed sister Moret (Michelle Madrigal) and a retarded brother plus skeletons like parricide and incest that were now threatening to come out of the closet. Superb performances from the entire cast.
Director	Gil Tejada
Writer(s)	Don Michael Perez
Cast	Marvin Agustin, Nadine Samonte and Sunshine Dizon

=== Season 5 ===
==== Ina, Kasusuklaman Ba Kita? ====
Air date	January 25 to May 21, 2010
English Title	A Mother's Sacrifice
Synopsis	The series tells the story of Alvina Montenegro (Jean Garcia) and her three children, Rav (Dion Ignacio), Rossan (Iwa Moto), and Rizzi (Jennica Garcia) who all have different fathers. Despite such unconventional set-up, Alvina fully embraces her duties as a mother and only has the best interest of her family at heart. Of the three, Alvina is closest to Rizzi, who, unlike Rav and Rossan, grew up without the privilege of having a father around. Until one day, a man by the name of Daniel Bustamante (Ariel Rivera) arrives at Alvina's doorstep and claims to be Rizzi's father. Owing to her materialistic nature, Alvina doubts Daniel's capability as a father due to his financial instability. Rizzi, on the other hand, wants to be with Daniel. And days before her 18th birthday, Rizzi plans a rendezvous with Daniel in order for them to finally be together, as well as to break free from Alvina’s manipulative ways. Desperate to prove himself to Alvina, Daniel dabbles in business but in the process, ends up losing all of his hard-earned savings. This prompts him to commit a crime and he ends up in jail causing him to miss what might have been his last chance to finally be with his daughter. Life goes on for Alvina and her children but nothing is the same again. Alvina is able to convince Rizzi that Daniel has abandoned her but at what cost? Rossan's rich politician dad turns his back at her, while Rav's mental condition a result of a traumatic incident as a child becomes worse forcing him to risk his own life. As a result, Alvina couldn't help but blame herself for her children's misfortune and categorizes herself as a failure in being a mother. Can Alvina still find enough faith and fortitude to rebuild her family? More importantly, can she find it in her heart to forgive herself?
Director	Gil Tejada Jr.
Writer(s)	Senedy Que
Cast	Jean Garcia, Jennica Garcia and Ariel Rivera

==== Gumapang Ka sa Lusak ====
Air date	February 8 to June 18, 2010
English Title	Secret Affairs
Synopsis	Gumapang Ka sa Lusak revolves around the lives of engaged sweethearts Rachel (Jennylyn Mercado), an aspiring young actress, and Levi (Dennis Trillo), a poor, happy-go-lucky guy. In the town of San Felipe, Rachel's beauty stands out. She becomes the object of desire for many men, including their own mayor, Edmundo Guatlo (Al Tantay). With a fervent desire to have her, Mayor Guatlo will use all his power to make Rachel his mistress. Rachel rejects all the gifts and favors offered by the mayor. However, she will fall into the wicked mayor's trap after a series of misfortunes happen to her loved ones, including her fiancé Levi, who gets imprisoned due to an illegal activity. Although the mayor's wife, Rowena (Sandy Andolong), is aware of her husband's infidelity, she goes along with it as long as the affair doesn't affect her comfortable and powerful position in the society. However, things will make a sudden turn when Mayor Guatlo's secret is exposed to the public. It is a secret that will uncover a series of other secrets. Will the mayor be able to win when he runs anew for the mayoralty post in the coming election? Will the expose free Rachel from being the Mayor's mistress? Will fate lead her back to the loving arms of Levi? Or is it too late for the hapless lovers to rekindle their affection?
Director	Mario J. delos Reyes
Writer(s)	Keiko Aquino
Cast	Dennis Trillo and Jennylyn Mercado

==== Basahang Ginto ====
Air date	May 24 to September 24, 2010
English Title	Golden Heart
Synopsis	Orang was raised in an Aeta community by a couple who rescued her from a mining accident. When her father was killed while trying to protect their land, Orang, her pregnant mother Ising, and sister Gilay were left with no choice but to evacuate and seek new life in the city. But life in Manila turned out to be crueler than they expected. One night, while selling rugs on the street, a speeding car accidentally hit Ising, leaving her permanently incapacitated. As such, Orang was left with the responsibility of single-handedly caring and providing for her entire family. By a stroke of fate, Orang meets Danny, a wealthy bachelor who mysteriously offers her a job as a maid in his grandmother's house. Nurturing a broken heart from her scheming girlfriend Sylvia, Danny plans to use Orang to claim revenge against Sylvia by educating and dressing their housemaid to act and look like a real socialite. Danny also changes her name from Orang to Laura Esquiviel. But Danny soon realizes that he no longer needs to make Sylvia jealous as he is already falling in love with the beautiful Laura. Upon this discovery, however, Laura also finds out about what really happened during the night of the accident, which presumably involves Danny. Laura ends up running away from the mansion bearing two things in mind: to seek revenge and to unravel the mystery that conceals her true identity.
Director	Joel Lamangan
Writer(s)	R.J. Nuevas
Cast	Geoff Eigenmann and Carla Abellana

==== Trudis Liit ====
Air date	June 21 to October 22, 2010
English Title	Little Trudis
Synopsis	Trudis, a five-year-old girl who possesses ideal traits that parents would want to have for their daughter: pretty, kind-hearted, helpful, diligent and smart. She is well loved by her adoptive father Lino (Jao Mapa) and her younger sister Upeng (Jamaica Oliver). The only thing missing in Trudis life is the affection from her mother, Magda (Maricel Morales). Unfortunately a tragic incident will hit the family leading Trudis and Upeng to seek refuge from their caring and compassionate distant relative Mercedes (Maxene Magalona) who will be assisted by her friend Migs (Mike Tan). But Trudis' serene and joyful life changes when the little girl finally meets her biological father Nick (Cris Villanueva). Hoping to have a better life, Trudis will move in with Nick and his new family which includes Nick's wife Honey (Pauleen Luna), Honey's sister Sugar (Francheska Salcedo) and her mother Lolly (Gina Alajar). Little did Trudis know that her father’s family will just make her life miserable.
Director	Don Michael Perez
Writer(s)	Kit Villanueva-Langit
Cast	Maxene Magalona, Pauleen Luna, Mike Tan and Jillian Ward

== See also ==
- Sine Novela
