= Rainier Castillo =

Filipino actor, singer and model

- Born: Rainier Joseph Diaz Castillo; October 21, 1985 (age 40); Quezon City, Metro Manila, Philippines
- Other names: Rain, Buboy, RJ
- Occupations: Actor; dancer; singer; model; endorser
- Years active: 2003–2011; 2014–2017; 2023–present
- Spouse: Diane Quizon (m. 2019)
- Children: 1

Rainier Joseph Diaz Castillo, better known simply as Rainier Castillo (born October 21, 1985), is a Filipino actor, singer, model, and dancer. His father lives in Winnipeg, Manitoba, Canada. He is known for his "killer smile" and one-trick pony of identified with his F4 hairstyle of Jerry Yan. He made it as one of the Final Four in the first season of StarStruck, though he eventually lost the title of Ultimate StarStruck Male Survivor to Mark Herras. He is a former star of GMA Network, now a Kapatid of TV5 then in 2014, Castillo went back to Kapuso Network.

== Biography/career ==
A freshman from AMA Computer University, he joined the reality-based artista search StarStruck and was linked over four female survivors during the competition: Jade Lopez, Yasmien Kurdi, Jennylyn Mercado and Sheena Halili. He was linked with Jade Lopez because during the competition Lopez had a crush on him, he was linked with Sheena Halili and was his love team on the competition but when Halili got eliminated their love team had stopped after the contest they continued to have a relationship but later called it off.

Though he lost in the competition, StarStruck is considered the turning point for his career. He is visible in shows of the station such as teen-oriented shows like Click and Joyride, fantaseryes like Mulawin, Majika, Kamandag, Fantastic Man and Tasya Fantasya, comedy shows like Hokus Pokus and drama series like Maynila, Love to Love and Bakekang.

In 2010, he transferred to TV5 and signed a two-year non-exclusive contract with the network and was managed by Noel Ferrer (the manager of Ryan Agoncillo and many others).

== Endorsements ==
Castillo has a few commercials to his credit, like Hapee Toothpaste (one commercial as an individual and another with Angel Locsin). He was also a model for Bench FIX Salon and he took part in Bench's 2004 Understatement underwear fashion show held at the Araneta Coliseum. In December 2005, he also appeared in a Sunsilk Touch Flicks short film with his then-on-screen partner Yasmien Kurdi.

== Filmography ==
=== Film ===
Year	Title	Role
2004	So Happy Together	Miles
2005	Happily Ever After	Gio
2005	Lovestruck	Cholo
2005	Shake, Rattle & Roll 2k5	Jay
2009	Rock & Roll	–
2009	Ded na si Lolo	Jimmy
2009	OMG (Oh, My Girl!)	Inday Langging
2009	Pangarap Kong Jackpot: Bahay ni Lolo Hugo	–
2009	Hellphone	–

=== Television / Digital Series ===
Year	Title	Role
2004	StarStruck	Himself/First Prince
2004	Stage 1: Live!	Himself
2004	Stage 1: The StarStruck Playhouse	Himself
2004	Click	Jerry
2004	CLICK Barkada Hunt	Himself
2004	Joyride	Ken
2004	SOP: Sobrang Okey, Pare!	Himself/Guest
2004	SOP Gigsters	Himself/Guest
2004	Mulawin	Pagaspas/Gus
2005	Love To Love (Season 6): Wish Upon A Jar	Obet – The Genie
2005	Now and Forever: Ganti	Ricky
2005	Etheria: Ang Ikalimang Kaharian ng Encantadia	Nakba
2006	Encantadia: Pag-ibig Hanggang Wakas	Nakba
2006	Hokus Pokus	Prince
2006	Majika	Jimboy/Erastus
2006	Bakekang	Joshua
2007	Mga Kuwento ni Lola Basyang: Pandakyotyong	Pandakyotyong
2007	Bleach	Uryū Ishida (voice acting)
2007	Fantastic Man	Arman
2007	Carlo J. Caparas' Kamandag	Ikoy
2008	E.S.P.: When the Phone Rings	Guest
2008	Tasya Fantasya	Raz
2008	Codename: Asero	Nicky San Juan
2008	LaLola	Adult Boggie (Special Guest Role)
2009	Sine Novela: Paano Ba Ang Mangarap?	Vince Galton
2009	Dear Friend: Bakasyonistas	Aaron
2009	Bubble Gang	Himself/Cast Member
2009	SRO Cinemaserye: Reunion	Angelo
2009	Full House	Donald Asuncion
2010	Lokomoko U	Himself
2010	P.O.5	Himself/Co-host
2011	Midnight DJ	Himself/Guest
2011	Face To Face Untold Stories: Madilim Na Kahapon	Himself/Guest
2011	Ang Utol Kong Hoodlum	Peter
2014	Imbestigador	Romnick
2014	Magpakailanman: Pabrika Ng Bata	Roland
2014	Sunday All Stars	Himself/Guest
2014	AHA!	Himself/Guest
2014	Celebrity Bluff	Himself/Guest
2014	Tunay Na Buhay	Himself
2016	Wattpad Presents: The Other Side	Kiel
2016	LolaBasyang.com	Tristan
2016	Wish Ko Lang: Masakit Ang Umibig	Pedro
2016	CelebriTV	Himself/Guest
2017	All Star Videoke	Himself/Player
2020	Eat Bulaga!	Himself/Bawal Judgmental guest
2021; 2024	All-Out Sundays	Himself/Guest
2023–24	Black Rider	Kim Arthur†

== Discography ==
- I Love You Babe

== Award ==
- 2004 PMPC Star Awards for TV "Best Male New TV Personality" from his show "Click"

Awards and achievements
Preceded by New	StarStruck; Runner-up; 2003 (season 1)	Succeeded by CJ Muere
