= Sheena Halili =

Filipino actress

Sheena Halili-Manzanero
- Born: Sheena Yvette Castro Halili; January 16, 1987 (age 39); San Fernando, Pampanga, Philippines
- Occupations: Actress, host
- Years active: 2003–2019; 2023–present
- Agent: Sparkle GMA Artist Center (2004–2019)
- Spouse: Jeron Manzanero (m. 2020)
- Children: 3

Sheena Yvette Castro Halili-Manzanero (born January 16, 1987) is a Filipino actress, host, and businesswoman. She is best known for her portrayals as a sidekick to protagonists or antagonists in hit television series.

== Career ==
Halili entered Philippine showbusiness through the first wave of StarStruck, the reality-based star search of GMA Network. She was one of finalists, dubbed as the Final 14. Halili, together with those who were eliminated during the course of the show, are now known as Starstruck Batch 1 Avengers. She was linked with her co-survivor Rainier Castillo but it was later confirmed that they really dated after the show. She also starred in a commercial for Head & Shoulders where she was partnered with Alvin Aragon.

She considers her role in the highly acclaimed remake series Marimar (2007) as her biggest break on television. She played the role of Monica, the oppressive and ditzy best friend of Angelika, portrayed by Katrina Halili. While Katrina's character never improved, Sheena's villain role turned good in the end. After Marimar, Halili would star in another number of remake TV Series such as LaLola (2007) as the antagonist Vicky, Ako si Kim Samsoon (2008) as Cynthia, Zorro (2009) as the recurring Lena, Rosalinda (2009) as the titular protagonist's best friend Becky, and in Full House (2009).

She starred as Pepper, her first lead role, in an episode of SRO Cinemaserye called, Reunion with Jennica Garcia.

Halili had her first Christian telemovie, Tanikala: Ang Ikalawang Libro with her StarStruck co-alumni, Mike Tan. It aired on GMA Network and was co-produced by CBN Asia in Holy Week 2010.

From 2011 to 2013, Halili became one of the news anchors in a defunct comedy news program, May Tamang Balita, which aired every Thursday night on GMA News TV (formerly Q 11). She also played a major supporting characters in historical-cultural epic, Amaya (2011).

=== StarStruck ===
Week #	Finalists	Status	Eliminated	Date
1	Final 14	Eliminated	Alvin Aragon	2003-11-07
2	Final 13	Eliminated	Cristine Reyes	2003-11-14
3	Final 12	Eliminated	Anton Dela Paz	2003-11-21
4	Final 11	Eliminated	Jade Lopez	2003-11-28
5	Final 10	Eliminated	Sheena Halili	2003-12-05

== Personal life ==
On August 26, 2018, Halili was engaged to Jeron Manzanero, a lawyer. They married on February 23, 2020. Their daughter, Martina, was born on December 13, 2020, followed by a son, Jio, on August 9, 2024 and her second son in September 2026.

== Filmography ==
=== Television ===
Year	Title	Role
2003–2004	StarStruck	Herself
2004	Stage 1: The Starstruck Playhouse	Herself
2004–2005	Joyride	Andrea
2005	SOP Gigsters	Herself
2005	Love to Love Season 5: Love Blossoms	
2005–2006	My Guardian Abby	Devi
2006	Maynila: Heart Beat	Julie
2006	Majika	Lyness
2007	Super Twins	Reporter
2007	Sine Novela: Sinasamba Kita	Diane
2007	Sine Novela: Kung Mahawi Man ang Ulap	Monique
2007–2008	Boys Nxt Door	Quinee
2007–2008	Marimar	Monica
2007–2010	Pinoy Records	Herself/Segment Host (Pinay Recorder)
2008	Ako si Kim Samsoon	Cynthia
2008–2009	LaLola	Vicky
2009	Zorro	Lena
2009	Maynila: Fight or Hide	Nikki
2009	Dear Friend: Bakasyonistas	Tracy
2009	Rosalinda	Becky
2009	SRO Cinemaserye Presents: Reunion	Pepper Pie Paras
2009–2010	StarStruck	Herself
2009–2010	Full House	Lisette Montemayor-Asuncion
2010	Panday Kids	Oxana
2010	Diva	Lilet
2010	Langit sa Piling Mo	Bernadette "Berna" Soriano
2010	Kaya ng Powers	Shalani Powers
2010	Bantatay	Ming-ming
2011	Dwarfina	Sabrina
2011–2012	May Tamang Balita	Herself/Anchor
2011–2012	Amaya	Ahak
2012	Alice Bungisngis and her Wonder Walis	Sinag
2012	Spooky Nights: Orasyon	Carla
2012	Tweets for My Sweet	Lily Montecarlo
2012	Temptation of Wife	Young Yolanda Armada
2013	Indio	Mayang/Fernando
2013	Celebrity Bluff	Herself/Guest Player
2013	Magpakailanman: Bayaning Yagit, The Kesz Valdez Story	
2013	Binoy Henyo	Agnes Santos
2014	Magpakailanman: A Mother's Sacrifice	Revekka Advincula
2014	Tanikala	Socorro (Cora)
2014–2015	Hiram na Alaala	Yasmin
2015	Pari 'Koy	Nida Oliviado-Altamira
2015	Magpakailanman: The Roland "Bunot" Abante Story	Cep
2015	The Rich Man's Daughter	Sally Lim-Apolinario
2015	Maynila: Twist of Fate	Lea
2015–2016	Destiny Rose	April Rose Vergara
2016	Poor Señorita	Maika Abesamis
2016	Laff Camera Action	Host/Comedian
2016	Dear Uge: Ms. Fortune Teller	Rose
2016	A1 Ko Sa 'Yo	Saling
2017	Destined to be Yours	Ninay
2017	Dear Uge: Retokada	Susie
2017	Road Trip	Herself/Guest
2018	Impostora	Rafaela "Riffy" Maniego/Rosette Cuevas
2018	Victor Magtanggol	Janice
2019	Ika-5 Utos	Millet
2019	Love You Two	Nina Solis

=== Film ===
Year	Title	Role
2006	Kilig... Pintig... Yanig...	Bea
2007	Pi7ong Tagpo	Young Carmen
2007	Katas ng Saudi	cameo appearance/Agnes
2008	Loving You	Pinky
2008	One True Love	Lily
2009	Yaya and Angelina: The Spoiled Brat Movie	May Dakono
2009	Ang Panday	Dahlia
2010	Super Inday and the Golden Bibe	Tonette
2011	Shake, Rattle & Roll 13 ("Lunod")	Sofia Hernandez
2011	Ang Panday 2	Dahlia
2012	Just One Summer	Catherine
2018	The Girl in the Orange Dress	Sasha

=== Other ===
Year	Title	Role
2008	Body Buddies: The Body Circuit Workout	Herself
2009	You-Rhian Ramos	Back-up Dancer

== Accolades ==
Year	Critics	Award
2004	StarStruck	10th Placer
2004	FHM (Philippines)	Rank 76
2006	FHM	Rank 73
2007	FHM	Rank 46
2007	PEP Forum Awards	Most Promising Actress
2008	FHM	Rank 60
2009	Kapuso Tag Awards	NOMINATED
2009	FHM	Rank 97
2011	FHM	Rank 80
2013	Golden Screen TV Awards	Best Supporting Actress (Comedy Category) Winner for Tweets for My Sweet
2014	Golden Screen TV Awards	Best Supporting Actress (Drama Category) Nominated for Indio
2016	PCMP Star Awards for TV	Best Game Show Host (Nominated with Betong Sumaya ) for Laff, Camera, Action!
2017	FHM	Rank 87
