= Paano Ba ang Mangarap? =

2009 Philippine television drama series

- Title card
- Also known as: Without Your Love
- Genre: Romantic drama
- Based on: Paano Ba ang Mangarap? (1983) by Eddie Garcia
- Directed by: Joel Lamangan
- Starring: Jennylyn Mercado; Mark Herras
- Theme music composer: Tata Betita
- Opening theme: "Paano Ba ang Mangarap?" by Jennylyn Mercado
- Country of origin: Philippines
- Original language: Tagalog
- No. of episodes: 78

Production
- Executive producer: Camille Gomba-Montaño
- Camera setup: Multiple-camera setup
- Running time: 25–35 minutes
- Production company: GMA Entertainment TV

Original release
- Network: GMA Network
- Release: February 16 – June 5, 2009

Paano Ba ang Mangarap? (transl. how is it to dream? / international title: Without Your Love) is a 2009 Philippine television drama romance series broadcast by GMA Network. Based on a 1983 Philippine film of the same title, the series is the twelfth instalment of Sine Novela. Directed by Joel Lamangan, it stars Jennylyn Mercado and Mark Herras. It premiered on February 16, 2009 on the network's Dramarama sa Hapon line up. The series concluded on June 5, 2009, with a total of 78 episodes.

== Cast and characters ==
Cast

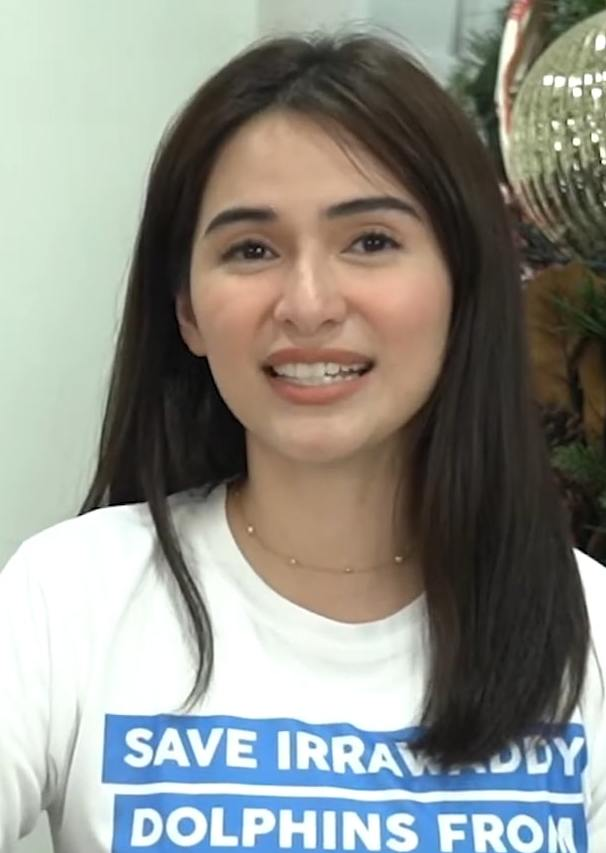
Jennylyn Mercado

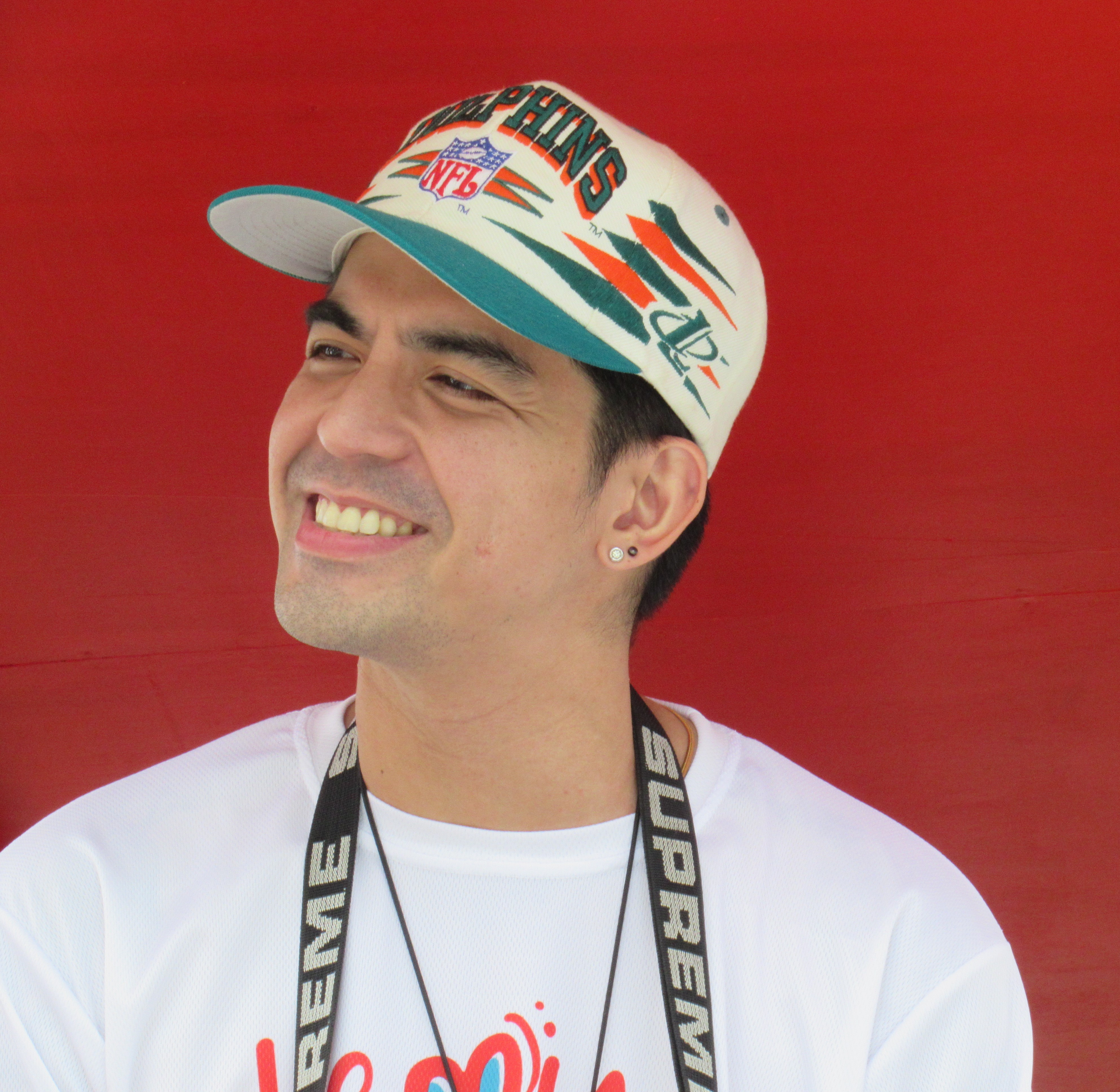
Mark Herras

Lead cast

- Jennylyn Mercado as Elizabeth "Lissa" Estrella-Valderama
- Mark Herras as Eric Valderama

Supporting cast

- Chynna Ortaleza as Maya Benitez
- Tirso Cruz III as Mateo Valderama
- Bing Loyzaga as Francia Balmores-Valderama
- Rainier Castillo as Vince Galton
- Irma Adlawan as Ising Estrella
- Emilio Garcia as Ramon Tolibas
- Jan Marini Alano as Gemma Estrella
- Jay Aquitania as Ardi
- Jim Pebangco as Gardo
- Ysa Villar as Glaiza
- Menggie Cobarrubas

Guest cast

- Hero Angeles as Benjamin "Benny" Valderama

== Ratings ==
Based from AGB Nielsen Philippines' Mega Manila household television ratings, the pilot episode of Paano Ba ang Mangarap? earned a 21.9% rating. The final episode scored a 27.8% rating.
