= Linlang =

Linlang may refer to:

- Linlang (film), a 1999 Philippine movie starring Pops Fernandez
- Linlang (2006 TV series), a Philippine thriller series
- Linlang (2023 TV series), a Philippine thriller series
