= Dear Friend (TV series) =

Philippine television drama series

- Title card
- Genre: Drama
- Presented by: Jolina Magdangal; Marvin Agustin
- Country of origin: Philippines
- Original language: Tagalog
- No. of seasons: 2
- No. of episodes: 92

Production
- Camera setup: Multiple-camera setup
- Running time: 30–59 minutes
- Production company: GMA Entertainment TV

Original release
- Network: GMA Network
- Release: July 20, 2008 – May 16, 2010

Dear Friend is a Philippine television drama anthology series broadcast by GMA Network. Hosted by Jolina Magdangal and Marvin Agustin, it premiered on July 20, 2008. The series concluded on May 16, 2010, with a total of 92 episodes.

== Cast and characters ==
=== First season ===
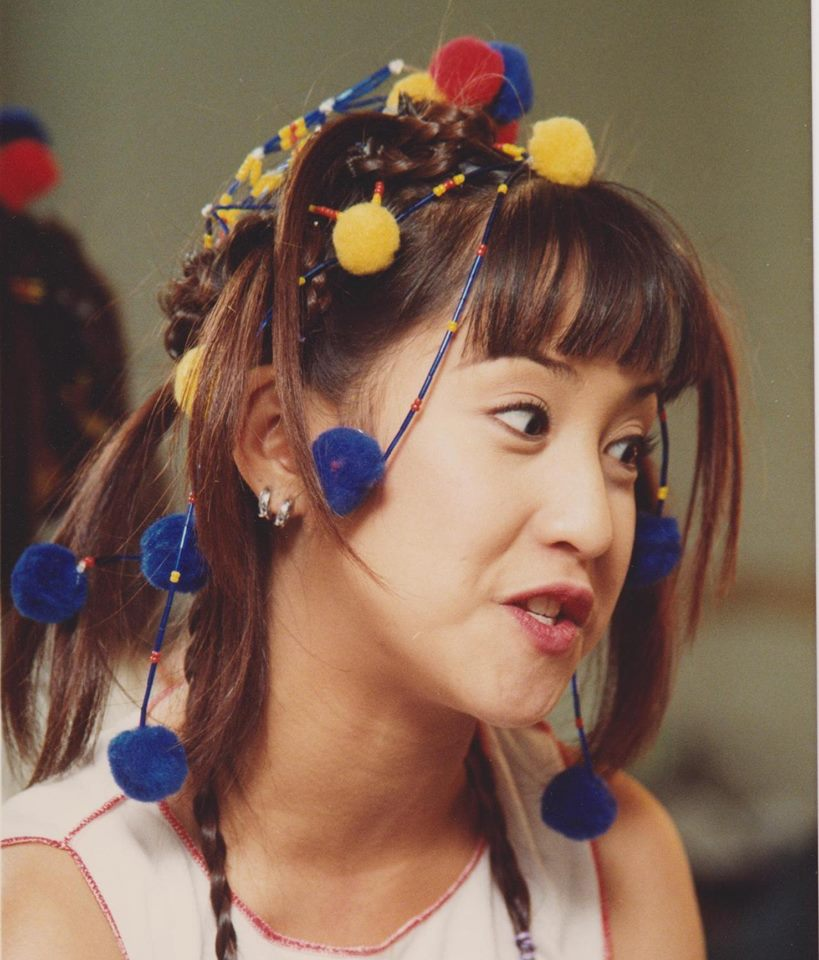
Jolina Magdangal serves as the host.

Guest cast

- Jennica Garcia
- Mart Escudero
- Aljur Abrenica
- Kris Bernal
- Dennis Trillo
- Antoinette Taus
- Paolo Contis
- Heart Evangelista
- Nadine Samonte
- Sheena Halili
- Sunshine Dizon
- Mark Anthony Fernandez
- Ehra Madrigal
- Michelle Madrigal
- Mark Herras
- Jennylyn Mercado
- Ryza Cenon
- JC de Vera
- Diana Zubiri
- Luis Alandy

Bulong ng Puso

- Jennica Garcia as Toni
- Mart Escudero as Mateo
- Rich Asuncion as Amor
- Dion Ignacio as Patrick
- Rainier Castillo as
- Daniel Fernando as Toni's father

Magkaribal

- Katrina Halili as Kim
- Jewel Mische as Cindy
- Alfred Vargas as Ron
- JC Tiuseco as Kiko

Igorota

- Glaiza de Castro
- Patrick Garcia
- Polo Ravales

Madrasta

- Yasmien Kurdi as Sheila
- Iwa Moto as Gellie
- Gary Estrada as Arnold
- Marco Alcaraz as Lino

Bakasyonistas

- Mark Herras as Alex
- Isabel Oli as Gina
- Ryza Cenon as Mia
- Chris Cayzer as Troy
- Sheena Halili as Tracy
- Rainier Castillo as Aaron

Kay Tagal Kitang Hinintay

- Sunshine Dizon as Rachel
- Polo Ravales as Michael
- Chynna Ortaleza as Dianne

Karibal

- Jennylyn Mercado as Cheska
- Wendell Ramos as Darrel
- Jean Garcia as Claire
- Hero Angeles as Junby

Three Bachelors

- Jennica Garcia as Emily
- Mart Escudero as Miguel Gonzales
- Jay R as Vince Gonzales
- Kyla as Sarah Ocampo
- Paulo Avelino as Jaime Gonzales
- Roy Vinzon as Vicente Gonzales
- Sandy Talag as younger Sarah
- JM Reyes as younger Miguel

Special

- JC de Vera as Tyron
- Ynna Asistio as Ella
- Jewel Mische

My Christmas List

- Barbie Forteza as Abby / Abygail
- Joshua Dionisio as Enzo
- Jake Vargas as Otep
- Bea Binene as Jillian / Jill
- Krystal Reyes
- Manilyn Reynes as Abby's mother
- Eula Valdez as Enzo's mother
- Ramon Christopher Gutierrez as Enzo's father

Almost A Love Story

- Rhian Ramos as Hannah
- TJ Trinidad as Rommel
- Paulo Avelino as Luigi
- Arci Muñoz

My Stalking Heart

- Jennica Garcia as Doris Degampat/Dora
- Carl Guevarra as Julio Makabugay
- Jef Gaitan as Nina
- Marvin Kiefer as Eric Manalastas
- Geoff Taylor
- Jay Aquitana
- Caridad Sanchez

Tisay

- Jackie Rice as Ella / Shiva
- Joross Gamboa as Adrian
- Chynna Ortaleza as Danielle
- Jade Lopez as Melody
- Ryza Cenon as Weng
- Jay Perillo as Mark
- Celia Rodriguez
- Sheree as Vien
- Rez Cortez

== Ratings ==
According to AGB Nielsen Philippines' Mega Manila household television ratings, the final episode of Dear Friend scored a 10.5% rating.
