= Chynna Ortaleza =

Filipino actress

- Born: Lara Serena Roque Ortaleza; December 6, 1982 (age 43); Quezon City, Philippines
- Occupations: Television host, model, actress
- Years active: 1995–2020; 2023—present
- Agent: Sparkle GMA Artist Center (2001–2020)
- Height: 1.6 m (5 ft 3 in)
- Spouse: Kean Cipriano (m. 2015)
- Children: 2

Lara Serena "Chynna" Roque Ortaleza-Cipriano (born December 6, 1982) is a Filipino actress, television host, and model. She is formerly a contract star of GMA Network. She is also Vice President for Production & Artist Management for O/C Records a fast rising music & entertainment agency in the Philippines.

== Career ==
Ortaleza landed her first TV gig as a junior reporter on the children's magazine show 5 and Up. She left the show after three years to concentrate on her studies. She returned to acting after graduating from high school, when she became known as Sprite's Kitikitxt girl via a popular TV commercial that launched her showbusiness career.

Ortaleza was later cast as Mimi on GMA Network's teen drama, Click, where she starred next to Richard Gutierrez.

In 2004, Ortaleza began to focus on her hosting career. After the success of the first season of StarStruck, Ortaleza hosted the StarStruck's Friday live show, Stage 1 Live, with Cogie Domingo and Raymond Gutierrez. Stage 1 Live was cancelled after one season. She was then added to the new youth segment of SOP (Sobrang Okey Pare), titled as SOP Gimikada then changed to SOP Gigsters. She was then cast as host in the second season of 3R with Iza Calzado and Bettina Carlos. She was also a cast member of Joyride.

In 2010 to 2012, she played more than five major villainess character roles.

In 2013, Ortaleza was cast as the hard-hearted and soft-spoken Minerva on Kakambal ni Eliana, along with Sherilyn Reyes-Tan and Lexi Fernandez, the three of them are the lead villains to the main heroine, Eliana. Ortaleza's character in the end became snake and tries to murder Eliana as a revenge for Nora's demise (Sherilyn Reyes-Tan).

In 2005, Ortaleza appeared in the first issue of Pump Magazine. She was also a part of Metro Magazine and FHM's "100 Sexiest Women in the World."

Ortaleza then starred in the soap opera Sugo and joined the MTV VJ Hunt to become one of the 16 finalists.

Though she did not win the title, she got the People Choice awards.

For the year 2006, Ortaleza was on the list again of FHM 100 sexiest women.

In 2014 she played as Colleen on Second Chances and on 2018 she played the kind-hearted and tough Lynette on Victor Magtanggol. Her Lynette character was slightly hateful to her mother for abandoning them but later learns to forgive her.

== Personal life ==
In November 2015, Ortaleza married singer and actor Kean Cipriano. On April 20, 2016, the couple had their first child, a daughter named Stellar. The name of their daughter was inspired by one of the songs of their favorite band Incubus. On September 25, 2019, Ortaleza gave birth to their son, Salem. The name of their son means "peace" in Hebrew.

== Filmography ==
=== Film ===
Year	Title	Role
2002	Bakit Papa	Chiqui
2003	Mano Po 2: My Home	Yna
2004	Kuya	Jill
2005	Kilig, Pintig, Yanig	Mitch
2009	Forget Me Not	Karla
2012	Migrante	Edna
2013	Menor de Edad	Nancy
2013	Ano Ang Kulay Ng Mga Nakalimutang Pangarap?	Monette
2014	Basement	Angela
2014	Dementia	Olivia
2014	Hustisya	Kristal
2014	#Y	Abby

=== Television / Digital Series ===
Year	Title	Role
1997–2002	5 and Up	Herself / Host
1999–2004	Click	Mimi Mendez
2001	Ikaw Lang ang Mamahalin	Melanie Fuentebella
2001	GMA Telecine Specials	Various
2002	Campus Romance	Various
2002–2003	Habang Kapiling Ka	Donna Javellana-Capistrano
2002	Maynila	Various
2002	Click Barkada Hunt	Host
2003–2004	Joyride	Lea
2003	Love to Love: Maid For Each Other	Jen
2003	Love to Love 2: My 1, 2 Love	Nikki
2005	Bahay Mo Ba 'To?	Tingting
2005	Love to Love 7: Haunted Love House	Nadia
2005–2006	Sugo	Rebecca
2006	Now and Forever: Linlang	Jane
2006	Atlantika	Vera
2007	Sine Novela: Pati Ba Pintig ng Puso	Mabel
2007–2008	La Vendetta	Joanna Alumpihit
2008	Codename: Asero	Fran Guevarra
2009	Sine Novela: Paano Ba ang Mangarap?	Maya Benitez
2009	Dear Friend: Kay Tagal Kitang Hinintay	Dianne
2009	SRO Cinemaserye: The Eva Castillo Story	Pilar
2009	Adik Sa'Yo	Lisa
2010	The Last Prince	Lourdez
2010	Dear Friend: Tisay	
2010	Claudine	
2010	Sine Novela: Trudis Liit	Precious Toledo
2010	Jillian: Namamasko Po	Mavic
2011	Magic Palayok	Natasha Ledesma
2011	Pepito Manaloto	Nancy
2011	Pahiram ng Isang Ina	Sophia
2012	Legacy	Young Eva Altamirano-Alcantara
2012	Luna Blanca	Young Divine Alvarez-Buenaluz (1st and 2nd chapter)
2012–2013	Sana ay Ikaw na Nga	Olga Villavicer / Dulce
2013	Kakambal ni Eliana	Minerva San Beda
2013	My Husband's Lover	Stella
2013–2014	Adarna	Janelle
2014	Dading	Celine Pacheco-Rodriguez
2015	Second Chances	Colleen Paredes
2015	The Rich Man's Daughter	Batchi Luna
2015	Karelasyon	Julia
2015	Juan Tamad	Ellen Da General
2016	Magpakailanman: Hula ng kamatayan: The Marivic Celi Story	Marivic Celi
2016	Magpakailanman: The Happy and Sad Adventures of Tekla: The Romeo Librada Story	Ayrin
2017	Mulawin vs. Ravena	Reyna Rashana
2017	Ika-6 na Utos	Maui Alcaraz
2017–2020	Idol sa Kusina	Herself / Co-host
2018	Wagas	Kara David
2018	Victor Magtanggol	Lynette Magtanggol-Domingo / Hel
2018	Wowowin	Herself
2023—2024	Black Rider	Brenda Yuzon-Valmoria

== Awards and nominations ==
Year	Film Awards/Critics	Award	Result
2013	61st FAMAS Awards	Best Supporting Actress (Migrante)	Nominated
2015	17th Gawad PASADO Awards	Pinakapasadong Katuwang na Aktres (Dementia)	Nominated
