= StarStruck season 1 =

Season of a Philippine television reality show

StarStruck
- Season 1
- Title card 2003
- No. of episodes: 71

Release
- Original network: GMA Network
- Original release: October 27, 2003 – February 1, 2004

Season chronology
- Next → Season 2

The first season of StarStruck, is a Philippine television reality talent competition show, was broadcast on GMA Network. Hosted by Dingdong Dantes and Nancy Castiglione, it premiered on October 27, 2003. The council was composed of Joey de Leon, Joyce Bernal and Ida Henares. The season ended with 71 episodes on February 1, 2004, having Mark Herras and Jennylyn Mercado as the Ultimate Survivors.

The series is streaming online on YouTube.

== Overview ==
StarStruck was first announced on GMA Network program SOP, where the hosts invited teenagers from 14 to 18 years old to audition for the upcoming season. Most of the auditions were held at the GMA Network's headquarters and at SM Supermalls throughout the Philippines.

The first season was directed by Lino Cayetano, who studied and taught film in the University of the Philippines, aside from his film and audio-visual communications course in New York Film Academy.

The pilot episode was aired on October 27, 2003. StarStruck was shown only on weekdays with tests shown from Mondays to Thursdays and the elimination night aired on Fridays. The show held its Final Judgment on February 1, 2004, at the Araneta Coliseum.

== Selection process ==
In the first year of the reality-talent search, out of hundreds who auditioned nationwide, only the Top 100 was chosen for the first cut. From the Top 100, it was trimmed down to the Top 60, then from the Top 60 to the Top 30, and from the Top 30 to the final fourteen finalists.

The Final 14 underwent various workshops and training in order to develop their personalities, talents, and charisma. But, the twist is that every week, one or two hopefuls from the final fourteen may have to say goodbye until only four remain. Those who were eliminated were dubbed as StarStruck Avengers.

The Final 4 vied for the coveted Ultimate Survivors titles, the Ultimate Male Survivor and the Ultimate Female Survivor. Both of them received P1,000,000 pesos each plus an exclusive management contract from GMA Network.

The Runners-up both received P100,000 pesos each plus an exclusive management contract from the network. The StarStruck Avengers (the losing contestants) also received an exclusive contract from the network.

== Hopefuls ==
When the Final 14 was chosen, they are assigned to different challenges every week that honed their acting, singing, and dancing abilities. Every Friday, one was to leave the competition until there were just six others left. From survivor six, there would be two eliminated, revealing the final four.

The Final 4 battled with each other on the Final Judgment. People chose who they wanted to win by online voting and text voting. 30% of the result came from the online and text votes and the remaining 70% from the council.

Color key:

Male contestant
Female contestant
Finalist
Runner-up
Winner

Place	Contestant	Age	Hometown	Exit	Result
1	Mark Herras	16	San Pablo, Laguna	February 1, 2004	Ultimate Male Survivor
2	Jennylyn Mercado	16	Las Piñas	February 1, 2004	Ultimate Female Survivor
3	Rainier Castillo	18	Quezon City	February 1, 2004	First Prince
4	Yasmien Kurdi	15	San Juan	February 1, 2004	First Princess
5	Nadine Samonte	15	Metro Manila	January 9, 2004	Avenger
6	Dion Ignacio	17	Siniloan, Laguna	January 9, 2004	Avenger
7	Christian Esteban	18	Tuguegarao	December 26, 2003	Avenger
8	Katrina Halili	17	Quezon City	December 19, 2003	Avenger
9	Tyron Perez	18	Concepcion, Tarlac	December 12, 2003	Avenger
10	Sheena Halili	16	San Fernando, Pampanga	December 5, 2003	Avenger
11	Jade Lopez	16	Tanauan, Batangas	November 28, 2003	Avenger
12	Anton dela Paz	17	Quezon City	November 21, 2003	Avenger
13	Cristine Reyes	15	Marikina	November 14, 2003	Avenger
14	Alvin Aragon	15	San Juan	November 7, 2003	Avenger

== Weekly Artista Tests ==
Color key:

Contestant with the Challenge Winner
Contestant was saved by the Public Vote and Council Vote
Contestant was in the Bottom Group
Contestant was Eliminated
Contestant was in the Final 4
Contestant was advanced to the Grand Finals
Contestant was the Runner-up
Contestant was the Winner

Week 1: The official Final 14 hopefuls have been chosen.

Contestant	Result
Rainier Castillo	Safe
Christian Esteban	Safe
Mark Herras	Safe
Dion Ignacio	Safe
Anton dela Paz	Safe
Tyron Perez	Safe
Alvin Aragon	Eliminated

Contestant	Result
Katrina Halili	Challenge Winner
Sheena Halili	Safe
Yasmien Kurdi	Bottom 3
Jade Lopez	Bottom 3
Jennylyn Mercado	Safe
Nadine Samonte	Safe
Cristine Reyes	Safe

Week 2: The Final 13 hopefuls.

Contestant	Result
Rainier Castillo	Safe
Christian Esteban	Safe
Mark Herras	Safe
Dion Ignacio	Safe
Anton dela Paz	Bottom 3
Tyron Perez	Safe

Contestant	Result
Katrina Halili	Safe
Sheena Halili	Challenge Winner
Yasmien Kurdi	Safe
Jade Lopez	Bottom 3
Jennylyn Mercado	Safe
Nadine Samonte	Safe
Cristine Reyes	Eliminated

Week 3: The Final 12 hopefuls.

Contestant	Result
Rainier Castillo	Challenge Winner
Christian Esteban	Safe
Mark Herras	Safe
Dion Ignacio	Safe
Anton dela Paz	Eliminated
Tyron Perez	Bottom 3

Contestant	Result
Katrina Halili	Safe
Sheena Halili	Safe
Yasmien Kurdi	Safe
Jade Lopez	Safe
Jennylyn Mercado	Bottom 3
Nadine Samonte	Safe

Week 4: The Final 11 hopefuls.

Contestant	Result
Rainier Castillo	Bottom 5
Christian Esteban	Bottom 5
Mark Herras	Bottom 5
Dion Ignacio	Safe
Tyron Perez	Safe

Contestant	Result
Katrina Halili	Safe
Sheena Halili	Bottom 5
Yasmien Kurdi	Challenge Winner
Jade Lopez	Eliminated
Jennylyn Mercado	Safe
Nadine Samonte	Safe

Week 5: The Final 10 hopefuls.

Contestant	Result
Rainier Castillo	Safe
Christian Esteban	Safe
Mark Herras	Bottom 5
Dion Ignacio	Bottom 5
Tyron Perez	Bottom 5

Contestant	Result
Katrina Halili	Safe
Sheena Halili	Eliminated
Yasmien Kurdi	Bottom 5
Jennylyn Mercado	Challenge Winner
Nadine Samonte	Safe

Week 6: The Final 9 hopefuls.

Contestant	Result
Rainier Castillo	Bottom 4
Christian Esteban	Safe
Mark Herras	Challenge Winner
Dion Ignacio	Bottom 4
Tyron Perez	Eliminated

Contestant	Result
Katrina Halili	Bottom 4
Yasmien Kurdi	Safe
Jennylyn Mercado	Safe
Nadine Samonte	Safe

Week 7: The Final 8 hopefuls.

Contestant	Result
Rainier Castillo	Safe
Christian Esteban	Safe
Mark Herras	Safe
Dion Ignacio	Bottom 3

Contestant	Result
Katrina Halili	Eliminated
Yasmien Kurdi	Safe
Jennylyn Mercado	Challenge Winner
Nadine Samonte	Bottom 3

Week 8: The Final 7 hopefuls. Avengers versus Survivors.

Contestant	Result
Rainier Castillo	Challenge Winner
Christian Esteban	Eliminated
Mark Herras	Bottom 3
Dion Ignacio	Safe

Contestant	Result
Yasmien Kurdi	Safe
Jennylyn Mercado	Bottom 3
Nadine Samonte	Safe

Week 9: The Final 6 hopefuls.

  - Eliminated Contestant: None

Contestant	Result
Rainier Castillo	Safe
Mark Herras	Bottom 3
Dion Ignacio	Bottom 3

Contestant	Result
Yasmien Kurdi	Challenge Winner
Jennylyn Mercado	Safe
Nadine Samonte	Bottom 3

Week 10: The Survivor 6 hopefuls, The official Final 4 hopefuls have been chosen.

  - Challenge Winner Contestant: Not Awarded

Contestant	Result
Rainier Castillo	Final 4
Mark Herras	Final 4
Dion Ignacio	Eliminated

Contestant	Result
Yasmien Kurdi	Final 4
Jennylyn Mercado	Final 4
Nadine Samonte	Eliminated

Week 11-12: The Final 4 Homecoming

Contestant	Result
Rainier Castillo	Advanced
Mark Herras	Advanced

Contestant	Result
Yasmien Kurdi	Advanced
Jennylyn Mercado	Advanced

Week 13: The Final Judgment, the Ultimate Survivors have been proclaimed.

Contestant	Result
Rainier Castillo	First Prince
Mark Herras	Ultimate Male Survivor

Contestant	Result
Yasmien Kurdi	First Princess
Jennylyn Mercado	Ultimate Female Survivor

== Final Judgment ==
The winner was announced on a two-hour TV special dubbed as StarStruck: The Final Judgment was held live on February 1, 2004, at the Araneta Coliseum, the venue of the event was jampacked with an estimated 15,000 StarStruck fans and supporters and almost the same number of fans used to wait outside the venue because of seats' insufficiency.

The opening dance number, together with this season's avengers, and they were joined by this final four. Hosted by Dingdong Dantes and Nancy Castiglione. The council was formed with Joey de Leon, Joyce Bernal and Ida Henares.

The final four then performs their solo performances. Rainier Castillo a dance number by a song of Klippers's Step Into The Rhythm performs a solo dance number with the Abstract dancers, and Mark Herras a dance number by a song of Britney Spears's Outrageous performs a solo dance number with the Manoeuvres, Yasmien Kurdi sang Christina Aguilera's The Voice Within, Jennylyn Mercado sang Alicia Keys's Fallin.

The avengers’ performance came in next, in a song and dance medley detailing the journey of the survivors from the audition process, the four International contenders and the elimination of the tenth avengers for a sing and dance number.

The male survivors, Rainier Castillo and Mark Herras dancing together with Joshua Zamora dance number with the Manoeuvres. Next the female survivors, Yasmien Kurdi and Jennylyn Mercado singing together with Lani Misalucha sang Mananatili Kang Mahal, Jaya sang Wala Na Bang Pag-ibig, and Regine Velasquez sang Dadalhin.

Announcement come, Jennylyn Mercado of Las Piñas is the Ultimate Female Survivor and Mark Herras of San Pablo, Laguna is the Ultimate Male Survivor were proclaimed as the Ultimate Survivors, each of them received P1,000,000 pesos each plus and an exclusive management contract from GMA Network.

While, Yasmien Kurdi of San Juan and Rainier Castillo of Quezon City were proclaimed as the Runners-up, each of them received P100,000 pesos each plus and an exclusive management contract from the network. The StarStruck Avengers (the losing contestants) also received an exclusive contract from the network.

It was also announced that the final fourteen will be having our own show. The Final Judgment rated 42.8%, impressively high for a late Sunday night telecast; the StarStruck: The Final Judgment was the only TV event that narrowly matched the Eat Bulaga Silver Anniversary Special.

== Signature dances ==
There are signature dances and journey songs made in this batch are the following:

- Average Joe
- Hey Yah
- Milkshake
- Outrageous
- Rubber Necking
- Step Into The Rhythm

== Stage 1: The StarStruck Playhouse ==
Because of the StarStruck fever, GMA Network created a new show, Stage 1: The StarStruck Playhouse. it premiered on March 22, 2004. The StarStruck test continues on this show where the final fourteen has to prove their staying power in the business. Every week from Mondays to Thursdays, the show presents a miniseries starring the final fourteen, but this time their acting prowess is put into test. The series ended on August 12, 2004 to give way to Joyride.

Color key:

Male contestant
Female contestant

Contestants	Original Loveteam	Final Loveteam
Mark Herras	Cristine Reyes	Jennylyn Mercado
Rainier Castillo	Jade Lopez	Yasmien Kurdi
Dion Ignacio	Katrina Halili	Nadine Samonte
Christian Esteban	Sheena Halili	Jade Lopez
Tyron Perez	Nadine Samonte	Katrina Halili
Anton dela Paz	Jennylyn Mercado	Cristine Reyes
Alvin Aragon	Yasmien Kurdi	Sheena Halili
Jennylyn Mecado	Anton dela Paz	Mark Herras
Yasmien Kurdi	Alvin Aragon	Rainier Castillo
Nadine Samonte	Tyron Perez	Dion Ignacio
Katrina Halili	Dion Ignacio	Tyron Perez
Sheena Halili	Christian Esteban	Alvin Aragon
Jade Lopez	Ranier Castillo	Christian Esteban
Cristine Reyes	Mark Herras	Anton dela Paz

=== Stage 1: LIVE! ===
Fridays would serve as critical day because the audience will judge their performance for the week through text messaging. An acting award is also given to the survivor who excelled in that week. Stage 1: LIVE! Is also somewhat a variety show for the survivors?

If Mondays to Thursdays, they showed their acting skills, during Fridays, they are able to show their dancing, singing and hosting prowess. The show was hosted by Chynna Ortaleza, Cogie Domingo and Raymond Gutierrez. The show already went off the air.

== Elimination chart ==
Color key:

Male contestant
Female contestant
Challenge Winner
Safe
Bottom Group
Eliminated
Advanced
Final 4
Finalist
Runner-up
Winner

Results per public and council votes
Place	Contestant	Top 14 (Week 1)	Top 13 (Week 2)	Top 12 (Week 3)	Top 11 (Week 4)	Top 10 (Week 5)	Top 9 (Week 6)	Top 8 (Week 7)	Top 7 (Week 8)	Top 6 (Week 9-10)		Top 4 (Week 11-13)		
Place	Contestant	11/7/03	11/14/03	11/21/03	11/28/03	12/5/03	12/12/03	12/19/03	12/26/03	1/2/04 ^{1}	1/9/04 ^{2}	1/16/04	1/23/04	2/1/04 ^{3}
1–4	Mark Herras	Safe	Safe	Safe	Bottom 5	Bottom 5	Challenge Winner	Safe	Bottom 3	Bottom 3	Final 4	Advanced	Advanced	Ultimate Male Survivor
1–4	Jennylyn Mercado	Safe	Safe	Bottom 3	Safe	Challenge Winner	Safe	Challenge Winner	Bottom 3	Safe	Final 4	Advanced	Advanced	Ultimate Female Survivor
1–4	Rainier Castillo	Safe	Safe	Challenge Winner	Bottom 5	Safe	Bottom 4	Safe	Challenge Winner	Safe	Final 4	Advanced	Advanced	First Prince
1–4	Yasmien Kurdi	Bottom 3	Safe	Safe	Challenge Winner	Bottom 5	Safe	Safe	Safe	Challenge Winner	Final 4	Advanced	Advanced	First Princess
5–6	Nadine Samonte	Safe	Safe	Safe	Safe	Safe	Safe	Bottom 3	Safe	Bottom 3	Eliminated			Avenger
5–6	Dion Ignacio	Safe	Safe	Safe	Safe	Bottom 5	Bottom 4	Bottom 3	Safe	Bottom 3	Eliminated			Avenger
7	Christian Esteban	Safe	Safe	Safe	Bottom 5	Safe	Safe	Safe	Eliminated					Avenger
8	Katrina Halili	Challenge Winner	Safe	Safe	Safe	Safe	Bottom 4	Eliminated						Avenger
9	Tyron Perez	Safe	Safe	Bottom 3	Safe	Bottom 5	Eliminated							Avenger
10	Sheena Halili	Safe	Challenge Winner	Safe	Bottom 5	Eliminated								Avenger
11	Jade Lopez	Bottom 3	Bottom 3	Safe	Eliminated									Avenger
12	Anton dela Paz	Safe	Bottom 3	Eliminated										Avenger
13	Cristine Reyes	Safe	Eliminated											Avenger
14	Alvin Aragon	Eliminated												Avenger

=== Notes ===
1. It was a non-elimination week. The bottom group are Mark Herras, Nadine Samonte and Dion Ignacio, But next week the two survivors were eliminated from the competition on January 9, 2004.
2. The final four was chosen on January 9, 2004. And the last avengers are Dion Ignacio and Nadine Samonte, The first called to eliminate is Dion Ignacio and the second called is Nadine Samonte.
3. In the final judgment night, Mark Herras and Jennylyn Mercado were proclaimed as the Ultimate Survivors.
