= Loving You (2008 film) =

2008 Filipino romance film

- Directed by: Don M. Cuaresma
- Screenplay by: Fairlane Raymundo
- Story by: Don M. Cuaresma; Fairlane Raymundo
- Produced by: Lily Y. Monteverde
- Starring: Yasmien Kurdi; JC de Vera
- Cinematography: Charlie Peralta
- Edited by: Ria De Guzman
- Music by: Jesse Lucas
- Production companies: Regal Films; Regal Multimedia, Inc. StudioMax
- Distributed by: Regal Films
- Release date: August 20, 2008
- Country: Philippines
- Languages: Filipino; English

Loving You is a 2008 Philippine romance film produced and distributed by Regal Films. It was released on August 20, 2008.

== Cast ==
=== Main cast ===
- Yasmien Kurdi as Lane Cruz
- J.C. de Vera as Jepoi Gumba
- Jean Garcia as Cyrill Sales
- John Prats as Axel Chua
- Polo Ravales as Tom Base
- Ehra Madrigal as Bry Damire
- Kris Bernal as Tonee Tienza
- Aljur Abrenica as Ryan Peyra
- Sheena Halili as Pinkie
- Andrea Torres as Kim
- Brent Javier as Caleb
- Jeri Neeman as Weej

=== Supporting cast ===
- John Lapus as Erich
- Tonton Gutierrez as Virgilio
- Karla Estrada as Lina
- Pinky Amador as Jackie
- Lovely Romero as Aleli
- Pinky Marquez as Cyrill's mom
- Hopia Legaspi as Lala
- Bianca Pulmano as Carol
