= Babangon Ako't Dudurugin Kita =

2008 Philippine television drama series

- Title card
- Also known as: Sweet Revenge
- Genre: Drama thriller
- Based on: Babangon Ako't Dudurugin Kita (1989) by Gilda Olvidado
- Developed by: Don Michael Perez
- Directed by: Joel Lamangan
- Starring: JC de Vera; Yasmien Kurdi
- Theme music composer: Von de Guzman ("Vengeance"); Tata Betita and Garry Cruz ("Kung Sana Bukas")
- Opening theme: "Vengeance"
- Ending theme: "Kung Sana Bukas" by Maricris Garcia
- Country of origin: Philippines
- Original language: Tagalog
- No. of episodes: 70

Production
- Executive producer: Winnie Hollis-Reyes
- Camera setup: Multiple-camera setup
- Running time: 20–42 minutes
- Production company: GMA Entertainment TV

Original release
- Network: GMA Network
- Release: March 24 – June 27, 2008

Babangon Ako't Dudurugin Kita (transl. I will rise and crush you / international title: Sweet Revenge) is a 2008 Philippine television drama thriller series broadcast by GMA Network. The series is based on a 1989 Philippine film of the same title. Directed by Joel Lamangan, it stars Yasmien Kurdi and JC de Vera. It premiered on March 24, 2008 on the network's Telebabad line up. The series concluded on June 27, 2008, with a total of 70 episodes.

The series is streaming online on YouTube.

== Cast and characters ==
Cast

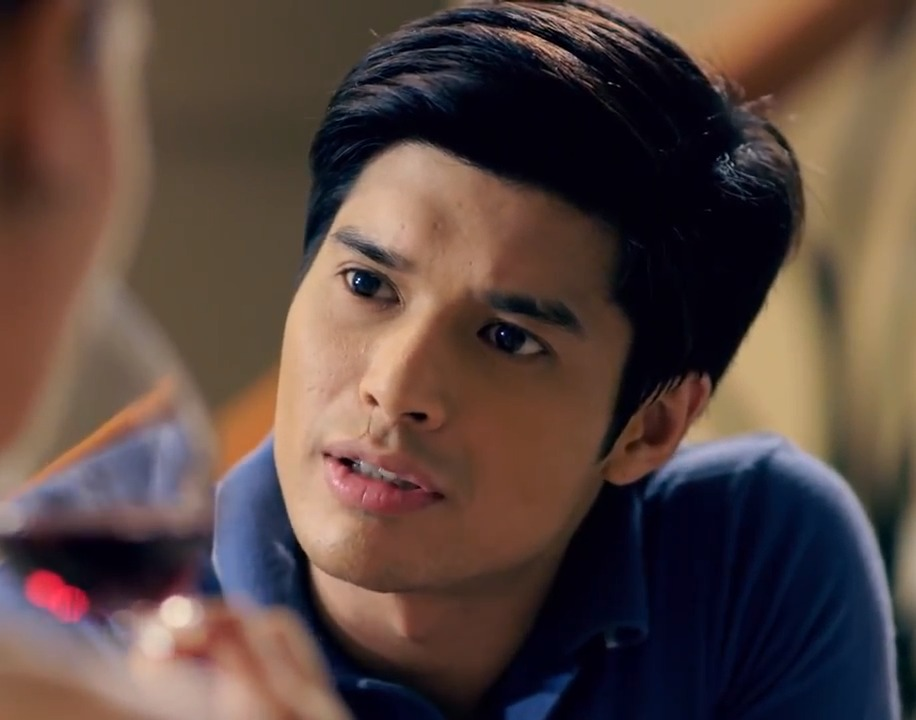
JC de Vera

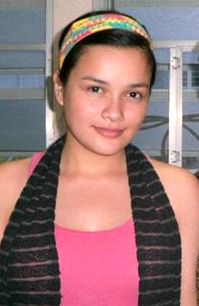
Yasmien Kurdi

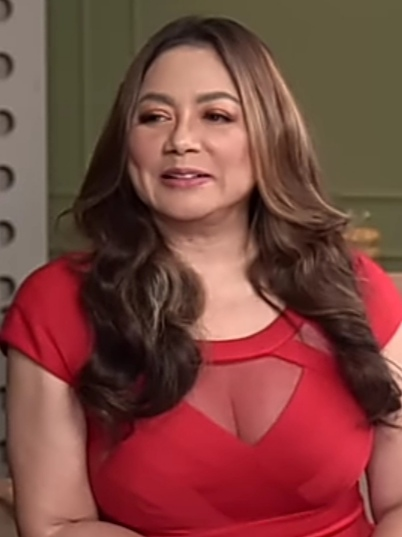
Dina Bonnevie

Lead cast

- JC de Vera as Derek Perantes / Rod
- Yasmien Kurdi as Salve Dizon de Leon / Emma Perantes

Supporting cast

- Dina Bonnevie as Evita Gomez Perantes
- Marvin Agustin as Alfred De Leon
- Angelika Dela Cruz as Via Fausto
- Tonton Gutierrez as Jango San Juan
- Paolo Contis as Tyrone San Juan
- Glydel Mercado as Imelda / Verna Jornales
- Diana Zubiri as Julie Maceda San Juan

Recurring cast

- Tony Mabesa as Gabriel Fausto
- LJ Reyes as Joanna Marie "Joey" Salcedo
- Jay Aquitania as Juno San Juan
- Patrick Garcia as Lawrence Fajardo
- Robert Ortega as Fredo
- Dion Ignacio as Pablo
- Jenny Miller as Beverly Castro
- Mart Escudero as Roman
- Arthur Solinap as Harry
- Stef Prescott as Courtney
- Paolo Serrano as Jake Sanchez

Guest cast

- Ian De Leon as Melvin
- Jennica Garcia as younger Julie
- Joseph Bitangcol as younger Tyrone
- Caloy Alde as Ariel
- Hanni Miller as Agnes
- Lizzy Pecson as Belen
- Chariz Solomon as Jadane
- Paulo Avelino as Brenan
- Mike Magat as Ruben Manansala
- Andrew Schimmer as Dennis
- Maybelline dela Cruz as Dolly dela Cruz
- Juan Rodrigo as Arturo Salcedo
- Gino Padilla as himself
- Emilio Garcia as Emilio Perantes
- Roi Vinzon as Roberto
- Mike Tan as Mario
- Odette Khan as Yolly
- Deborah Sun as Amparo
- Menggie Cobarrubias as Pepito

== Ratings ==
According to AGB Nielsen Philippines' Mega Manila household television ratings, the pilot episode of Babangon Ako't Dudurugin Kita earned a 28% rating.

== Accolades ==
Accolades received by Babangon Ako't Dudurugin Kita
Year	Award	Category	Recipient	Result	Ref.
2008	22nd PMPC Star Awards for Television	Best Drama Actress	Dina Bonnevie	Nominated	
