= Basement (2014 film) =

- Theatrical release poster
- Directed by: Topel Lee
- Screenplay by: Rona Lean Sales; Hector Macaso
- Story by: Topel Lee; Rona Lean Sales; Emmanuel Dela Cruz
- Produced by: Topel Lee; Larry Ang; Jose Mari Abacan; Annette Gozon-Abrogar; Erik Matti; Ronald “Dondon” Monteverde
- Starring: Betong Sumaya; Alvin Aragon; Carl Acosta; Chynna Ortaleza; Dex Quindoza; Dion Ignacio; Ellen Adarna; Enzo Pineda; Jan Manual; Kevin Santos; Kristofer Martin; Louise delos Reyes; Mona Louise Rey; Pilita Corrales; RJ Padilla; Sarah Lahbati; Teejay Marquez
- Cinematography: Sasha Palomares
- Edited by: Jay Halili
- Music by: Diwa de Leon
- Production companies: Coffee House Productions; Reality Entertainment; Springboard Films
- Distributed by: GMA Films
- Release date: February 12, 2014
- Running time: 100 minutes
- Country: Philippines
- Languages: Filipino; English
- Budget: ₱19 million
- Box office: ₱670,780,250 (April 2014); $356,890 (International Sales)

Basement is a 2014 horror film co-written and directed by Topel Lee.

== Synopsis ==
A group of people gets stuck in a basement parking for the night. At the onset, some are irritated and just can't wait to go home, while some don't even give a damn, knowing they can easily come out the next day. But when the power is shut off and as it gets close to midnight, strange things start to happen.

It all starts with one death. Followed by another and another. They don't really witness the killings, but they hear the screaming, and they see the bloodied bodies thereafter, making them fear for their lives.

As the night unfolds, they soon realize they're not dealing with an ordinary being. There's an evil creature stuck inside the basement with them. But what kind of creature is this? And how can they fight it?

== Cast ==
- Betong Sumaya as Bernard
- Alvin Aragon as Parley
- Carl Acosta as GJ
- Chynna Ortaleza as Angela
- Dex Quindoza as Lui
- Dion Ignacio as Mendoza
- Ellen Adarna as the victim
- Enzo Pineda as Jules
- Jan Manual as Migs
- Kevin Santos as Mang Mario
- Kristoffer Martin as Macoy
- Louise delos Reyes as Roxy
- Mona Louise Rey as Anna
- Pilita Corrales as Lola Meding
- RJ Padilla as Dondie
- Sarah Lahbati as Eliza
- Teejay Marquez as Ryan
- Anton Ferrer
- Aljur Abrenica

== Production ==
=== Filming ===
Topel Lee said the film was ten years in the making because of the CG (computer graphics) requirements. The film was shot in Metro Mall Las Piñas.
