= SRO Cinemaserye =

Philippine television drama series

- Title card
- Genre: Drama
- Developed by: Jun Lana
- Country of origin: Philippines
- Original language: Tagalog
- No. of episodes: 35

Production
- Executive producer: Joseph Buncalan
- Production locations: Metro Manila, Philippines
- Camera setup: Multiple-camera setup
- Running time: 45–60 minutes
- Production company: GMA Entertainment TV

Original release
- Network: GMA Network
- Release: March 26, 2009 – April 8, 2010

SRO Cinemaserye (transl. SRO cinemaseries) is a Philippine television drama anthology series broadcast by GMA Network. It premiered on March 26, 2009. The series concluded on April 8, 2010, with a total of 35 episodes.

== Chapters ==
=== Ganti ===
Genre	Drama
Air date	March 26 to May 21, 2009
Director	Dominic Zapata
Writer	R.J. Nuevas; Denoy Navarro-Punio
Cast and characters	Marvin Agustin as Jacob Manansala; Sheryl Cruz as Viola Ojeda; Geoff Eigenmann as Kevin Rodriguez; Maxene Magalona as Eloisa Barrientos; Bianca King as Janelle Alcantara; Daria Ramirez as Adella; Arci Muñoz as Annie; Kris Martinez as Luigi

=== Suspetsa ===
Genre	Suspense-Thriller, Drama
Air date	May 28 to July 16, 2009
Director	Mark A. Reyes
Writer	Des Garbes-Severino
Cast and characters	Jennylyn Mercado as Nina; Yasmien Kurdi as Leonor; Nadine Samonte as Abigail; Paolo Contis as Adam; Baron Geisler as Danny; Ryan Eigenmann as Chris; Victor Aliwalas as Matt

=== The Eva Castillo Story ===
Genre	Biography, Drama, Musical
Air date	July 23 to August 13, 2009
Director	Jun Lana
Writer	Suzette Doctolero
Cast and characters	Manilyn Reynes as Eva Castillo; Regine Velasquez as herself Glaiza de Castro as teenage Eva; Afi Africa as Louie Ignacio; Chynna Ortaleza as Pilar; Dion Ignacio as Jimboy; Renz Juan as younger Eva; Ella Guevarra as younger Regine; Stef Prescott as teenage Regine; Jan Manual as Danny Ayla Mendero as Charrie

=== Rowena Joy ===
Genre	Drama, Comedy
Air date	August 20 to September 10, 2009
Director	Soxie Topacio
Writer	Jun Lana
Cast and characters	Iza Calzado as Rowena Joy/RJ; Paolo Ballesteros as RJ; TJ Trinidad as Gino; Rez Cortez as RJ/Rowena Joy's father John Apacible as Gino's brother Joey Paras as Jessi; BB Gandanghari as Frannie; Renz Valerio as JR; Prince Stefan as Christian; Lawrence Gutierrez as Paolo; Sherrie as Mina; Sharmaine Centenera as RJ/Rowena Joy's mother

=== Reunion ===
Genre	Romance, Comedy
Air date	September 17 to October 15, 2009
Director	Soxie Topacio
Writer	Jun Lana
Cast and characters	Sheena Halili as Peppe; Jennica Garcia as Chantilly; Rainier Castillo as Angelo; Mart Escudero as Benjo; Kevin Santos as Ryan; Jade Lopez as Asheewari; Stef Prescott as Violet; Patani as Jemalyn; Jose Manalo as Ricky Tienes; John Lapus as Mother

=== Moshi-Moshi, I Love You ===
Genre	Romance, Comedy
Air date	October 22 to November 5, 2009
Director	Andoy Ranay
Writer	Jun Luna
Cast and characters	Rufa Mae Quinto as Perseveranda; Akihiro Sato as Akihiro Watanabe; Alicia Mayer as Gina Ukihino; Gloria Sevilla as Flora; Mosang; Ricci Chan

=== Carenderia Queen ===
Genre	Romance, Comedy
Air date	November 12 to December 3, 2009
Director	Mac Alejandre
Writer	Jun Lana
Cast and characters	Carla Abellana as Juliet; Geoff Eigenmann as Romeo; Gina Alajar as Waray; Rey "PJ" Abellana as Brigido; Melanie Marquez as Biday; Jace Flores as Harrold; Boobay as Sandra; Krista Kleiner as Britney

=== Exchange Gift ===
Genre	Comedy, Romance
Air date	December 10, 2009 to January 7, 2010
Director	Mac Alejandre
Writer	Jun Lana
Cast and characters	Dennis Trillo as Miguel; Francis Magundayao as EJ; Nadine Samonte as Sharon; Ryza Cenon as Veronique; Gene Padilla as Santa; Andi Eigenmann as Louella

=== Meet the Fathers ===
Genre	Comedy, Drama
Air date	February 11 to March 4, 2010
Director	Mac Alejandre
Writer	Des Garbes-Severino
Cast and characters	Christopher de Leon as Larry; Bayani Agbayani as Rigor; Ynna Asistio as Cheska; Joross Gamboa as Brent

=== Hot Mama ===
Genre	Comedy, Drama
Air date	March 11 to April 8, 2010
Director	Joel Lamangan
Writer	Des Garbes-Severino
Cast and characters	Eugene Domingo as Lola Cardenas/Hot Mama; Wendell Ramos as Randy; Janna Dominguez; Maureen Larrazabal as Mari; Victor Aliwalas as Bruce; Ces Quesada; Joseph Smisek

== Ratings ==
According to AGB Nielsen Philippines' Mega Manila household television ratings, the pilot episode of SRO Cinemaserye earned an 18.3% rating.

== Accolades ==
Accolades received by SRO Cinemaserye
Year	Award	Category	Recipient	Result	Ref.
2009	23rd PMPC Star Awards for Television	Best Drama Mini-Series	"Ganti"	Nominated	
2009	23rd PMPC Star Awards for Television	Best Drama Mini-Series	"Suspetsa"	Nominated	
2009	23rd PMPC Star Awards for Television	Best Drama Actor	Baron Geisler ("Suspetsa")	Nominated	
2010	24th PMPC Star Awards for Television	Best Drama Mini-Series	"Exchange Gift"	Nominated	
2010	24th PMPC Star Awards for Television	Best Drama Mini-Series	"The Eva Castillo Story"	Won	
