= Love Is All I Need =

Studio album by Yasmien Kurdi
- Released: May 2007
- Recorded: 2007
- Genre: Pop
- Language: English, Tagalog
- Label: GMA Records
- Producer: Felipe S. Yalung (EVP and COO); Buddy Medina (Executive Producer); Kedy Sanchez (Producer); Rene A. Salta (Managing Director)

Yasmien Kurdi chronology
In the Name of Love (2005)	Love Is All I Need (2007)

Singles from Love Is All I Need
- 1. "Kisapmata" Released: 2007; 2. "Love Is All I Need" Released: 2007; 3. "Take It or Leave It" Released: 2008; 4. "Goodbye" Released: 2008

Love Is All I Need the second solo album of Yasmien Kurdi after her successful debut album, In the Name of Love. This 13-track album was produced and released by GMA Records in May 2007

== Track list ==
1. "Kisapmata" - 4:41
2. "Give Me a Sign" - 2:52
3. "Love Is All I Need" - 3:47
4. "Even If" - 4:15
5. "Take It or Leave It" - 3:49
6. "Wishing Well" - 3:15
7. "One Day" - 3:36
8. "Hayaan Mo Na" - 3:19
9. "Goodbye" - 4:00
10. "Candlelight Romance" - 2:51
11. "Take It or Leave It" (I Know Mix) - 3:49
12. "Love Is All I Need" (Acoustic) - 3:40
