= In the Name of Love (Yasmien Kurdi album) =

Studio album by Yasmien Kurdi
- Released: May 27, 2005
- Genre: Pop
- Label: GMA Records
- Producer: Buddy C. Medina (executive), Freddie Saturno (album supervising), Kedy Sanchez (album supervising)

Yasmien Kurdi chronology
In the Name of Love (2005)	Love Is All I Need (2007)

In the Name of Love is the debut studio album of StarStruck finalist Yasmien Kurdi, released in May 2005. It was released on GMA Records. In 2006, the repackaged version of the album were released.

== Track listing ==
No.	Title	Writer(s)	Arranger(s)	Length
1.	"I Know"	Rebel Magdagasang	Marvin Querido	3:13
2.	"In the Name of Love"	Jimmy Antiporda	Jimmy Antiporda	4:40
3.	"Enjoy & Ride"	Ghost 13	Tristan Suguitan	4:06
4.	"Mamahalin"	Freddie Saturno	Alvin Nunez	3:49
5.	"Patuloy Pa Rin"	Freddie Saturno	Jun Tamayo	3:49
6.	"Umaambisyon"	Kedy Sanchez	Jun Tamayo	3:56
7.	"Kunwari Lang Ba"	Rebel Magdagasang	Alvin Nunez	3:54
8.	"Sa Akin Lang Sana"	Freddie Saturno	Jun Tamayo	3:58
9.	"Ikaw Pa Rin Sa Akin" (featuring Ghost 13)	Ghost 13	Tristan Suguitan	4:04
10.	"Manunumbalik Lamang"	Freddie Saturno	Tito Cayamanda	3:45

=== In the Name of Love (repackaged) AVCD format ===
No.	Title	Writer(s)	Arranger(s)	Length
1.	"Format data, not playable"
2.	"I Know" (music video)
3.	"In the Name of Love" (music video)
4.	"Umaambisyon" (music video)
5.	"I Know"	Rebel Magdagasang	Marvin Querido	3:13
6.	"In the Name of Love"	Jimmy Antiporda	Jimmy Antiporda	4:40
7.	"Enjoy & Ride"	Ghost 13	Tristan Suguitan	4:06
8.	"Mamahalin"	Freddie Saturno	Alvin Nunez	3:49
9.	"Patuloy Pa Rin"	Freddie Saturno	Jun Tamayo	3:49
10.	"Umaambisyon"	Kedy Sanchez	Jun Tamayo	3:56
11.	"Kunwari Lang Ba"	Rebel Magdagasang	Alvin Nunez	3:54
12.	"Sa Akin Lang Sana"	Freddie Saturno	Jun Tamayo	3:58
13.	"Ikaw Pa Rin Sa Akin" (featuring Ghost 13)	Ghost 13	Tristan Suguitan	4:04
14.	"Manunumbalik Lamang"	Freddie Saturno	Tito Cayamanda	3:45

== Personnel ==
- Buddy C. Medina - executive producer
- Freddie Saturno - album supervising producer
- Kedy Sanchez - album supervising producer
- Rene A. Salta - in charge of marketing
- Dominic Benedicto - mix engineering
- Nikki Cunanan - mix engineering
- Arnold Jallores - mix engineering
- Jimmy Antiporda - mix engineering
- Tris Suguita - mix engineering
- Joseph de Vera - cover design
- Jason Tablante - cover photography
- Jenjen Cabriana of Bambbi Fuentes Salon - make-up & hair

== See also ==
- GMA Records
- GMA Network
