= Joyride (TV series) =

Philippine television drama series

- Title card
- Genre: Drama
- Developed by: Don Michael Perez
- Written by: Don Michael Perez; Kit Villanueva-Zapata; Des Garbes-Severino
- Directed by: Mac Alejandre
- Starring: Cogie Domingo; JC de Vera; Mark Herras; Jennylyn Mercado; Yasmien Kurdi; Rainier Castillo
- Opening theme: "Overdrive" by Eraserheads
- Country of origin: Philippines
- Original language: Tagalog
- No. of episodes: 150

Production
- Executive producer: Camille Pengson
- Camera setup: Multiple-camera setup
- Running time: 42–54 minutes
- Production company: GMA Entertainment TV

Original release
- Network: GMA Network
- Release: August 16, 2004 – March 11, 2005

Joyride is a Philippine television drama series broadcast by GMA Network. Directed by Mac Alejandre, it stars Cogie Domingo, JC de Vera, Mark Herras, Jennylyn Mercado, Yasmien Kurdi, Sheena Halili and Rainier Castillo. It premiered on August 16, 2004 on the network's Dramarama sa Hapon line up. The series concluded on March 11, 2005, with a total of 150 episodes.

The series is streaming online on YouTube.

== Cast and characters ==
Cast

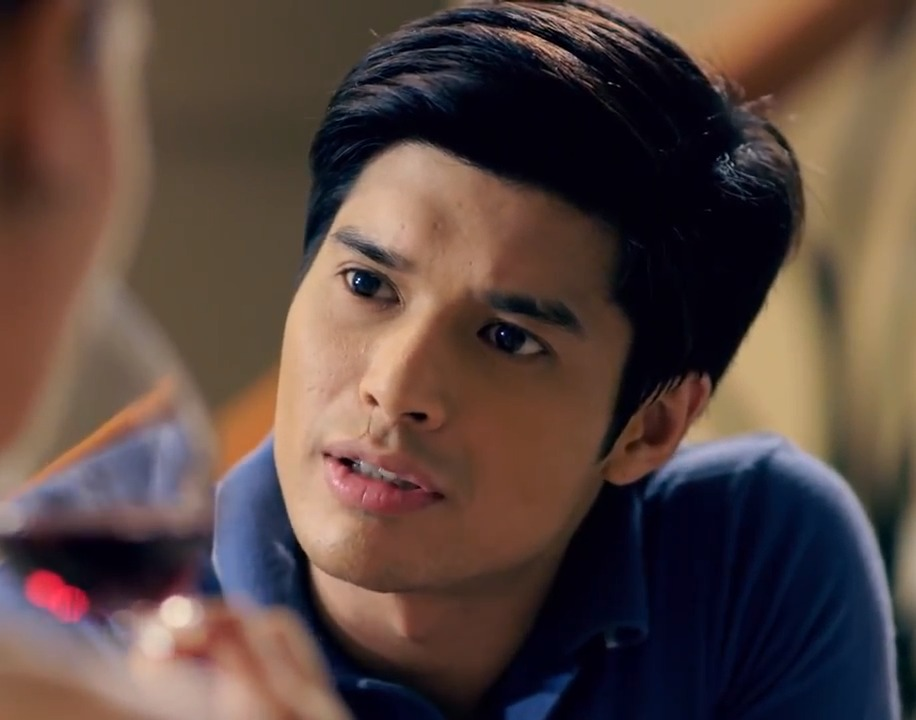
JC de Vera

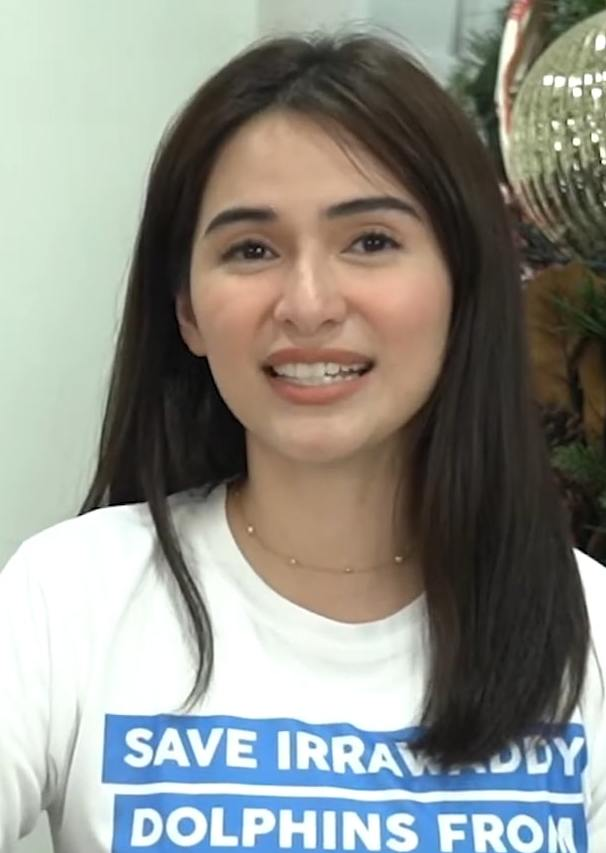
Jennylyn Mercado

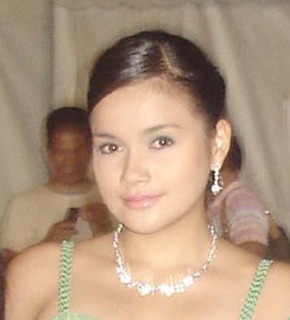
Yasmien Kurdi

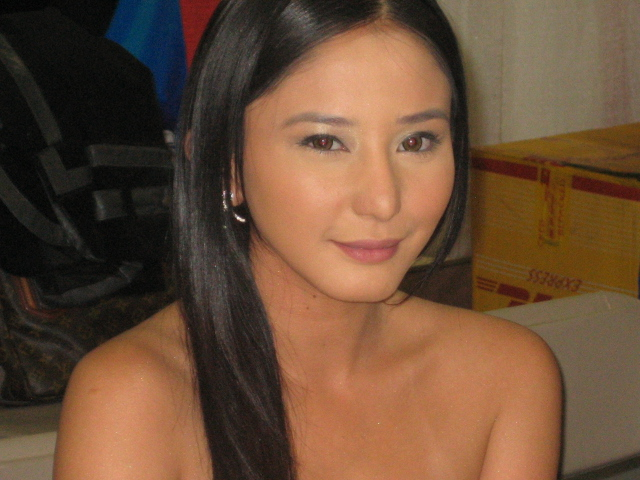
Katrina Halili

Lead cast

- JC de Vera as Carlo
- Cogie Domingo as Jason
- Jennylyn Mercado as Casey
- Mark Herras as Joeyboy
- Yasmien Kurdi as Rene / Irene
- Rainier Castillo as Ken

Supporting cast

- Katrina Halili as Vicki
- Sheena Halili as Andrea
- Dion Ignacio as D.J. / Brix
- Julianne Lee as Nicole
- Warren Austria as Justin
- Chynna Ortaleza as Lea

Recurring cast

- Isay Alavarez as Marisa
- Tonton Gutierrez as Bong
- Yayo Aguila as Evelyn
- Al Tantay as Rene's father
- Dino Guevarra as Kiko
- Jackie Lou Blanco as Aurora
- Allan Paule as Johnny
- Rez Cortez as Coach James
- Nanette Inventor as Lola Paula
- Alma Concepcion as Sonia
- Chinggoy Alonzo as Casey and Vicki's father
- Goyong as Bullet
- Kristel Fulgar as Angelica
- Czarina Lopez de Leon as Andrea's sister
- Gilleth Sandico as Malou
- Miguel Vera as Rico
- Girlie Sevilla as Girlie
- Charlie Davao

Guest cast

- Biboy Ramirez
- Tin Arnaldo
- Jake Cuenca
- John Medina
- Gayle Valencia

== Accolades ==
Accolades received by Joyride
Year	Award	Category	Recipient	Result	Ref.
2005	Golden Screen TV Awards	Outstanding Youth-Oriented Drama Series	Joyride	Nominated	
