= Kisapmata (song) =

1996 song performed by Rivermaya

Single by Rivermaya

from the album Trip
- Released: December 1995
- Genre: Pinoy rock
- Length: 4:41
- Label: Musiko Records & BMG Records (Pilipinas) Inc.
- Composer: Rico Blanco
- Lyricist: Rico Blanco
- Producers: Rico Blanco, Chito Roño, Lizza G. Nakpil

Rivermaya singles chronology
"Bring Me Down" (1995)	"Kisapmata" (1995)	"Himala" (1996)

"Kisapmata" (lit. 'In a Blink of an Eye') is a song written by Rico Blanco for the Filipino rock band Rivermaya. It was released as the lead single from their second album, Trip, in December 1995.

It was one of Rivermaya's songs on which the group's original frontman Bamboo Mañalac sings lead vocals, and was the first Rivermaya single after original guitarist Perf de Castro left. David Gonzales of Allmusic describes "Kisapmata" as "pleasant and tuneful", but "is less adventurous than much of the other material on Trip."

== Cover versions ==
- In 1996, comedian Michael V covered the song Kisapmata in English Version "Twinkle of an Eye". the track was included in his album "MEB: Miyusik English Bersyon".
- The song was covered in 2001 by APO Hiking Society. This was released on their album Banda Rito.
- In 2007, Yasmien Kurdi recorded this song and later released on Love Is All I Need and her version later released as a single.
- In 2018, The song was covered by YouTube sensation Raphiel Shannon and release as a debut single. A few days after its online release, her song grabbed the No. 4 spot on Spotify’s Philippines Viral 50 chart last March 30, 2018.
- In 2013, Daniel Padilla covered this song and was released on his second album DJP in April that year.
- On June 16, 2013, it was performed by Charice Pempengco in ASAP.
