= Sugo =

Philippine television drama series

- Title card
- Also known as: The Chosen One
- Genre: Action drama; Fantasy
- Developed by: R.J. Nuevas
- Written by: R.J. Neuvas; Renato Custodio, Jr.; Ma. Cristina Samson Velasco; Jules Katanyag
- Directed by: Dominic Zapata; Lore Reyes
- Creative directors: Jun Lana; Jake Tordesillas; Suzette Doctolero
- Starring: Richard Gutierrez
- Theme music composer: Jay Durias
- Opening theme: "Asa" by South Border
- Country of origin: Philippines
- Original language: Tagalog
- No. of episodes: 160

Production
- Executive producer: Helen Rose Sese
- Cinematography: Rhino Vidanes
- Camera setup: Multiple-camera setup
- Running time: 20–39 minutes
- Production company: GMA Entertainment TV

Original release
- Network: GMA Network
- Release: July 4, 2005 – February 10, 2006

Sugo (transl. emissary / international title: The Chosen One) is a Philippine television drama action fantasy series broadcast by GMA Network. Directed by Dominic Zapata and Lore Reyes, it stars Richard Gutierrez in the title role. It premiered on July 4, 2005, on the network's Telebabad line up. The series concluded on February 10, 2006, with a total of 160 episodes.

The series is streaming online on YouTube.

== Premise ==
Twins, Miguel and Amante are "Sugo" – the "chosen ones" to stop Apo Abukay—an evil warlord from the ancient times, whom used to perform human sacrifices to dark forces and is about to be resurrected as an "evil Anito" - a dark ancestral deity.

== Cast and characters ==
Cast

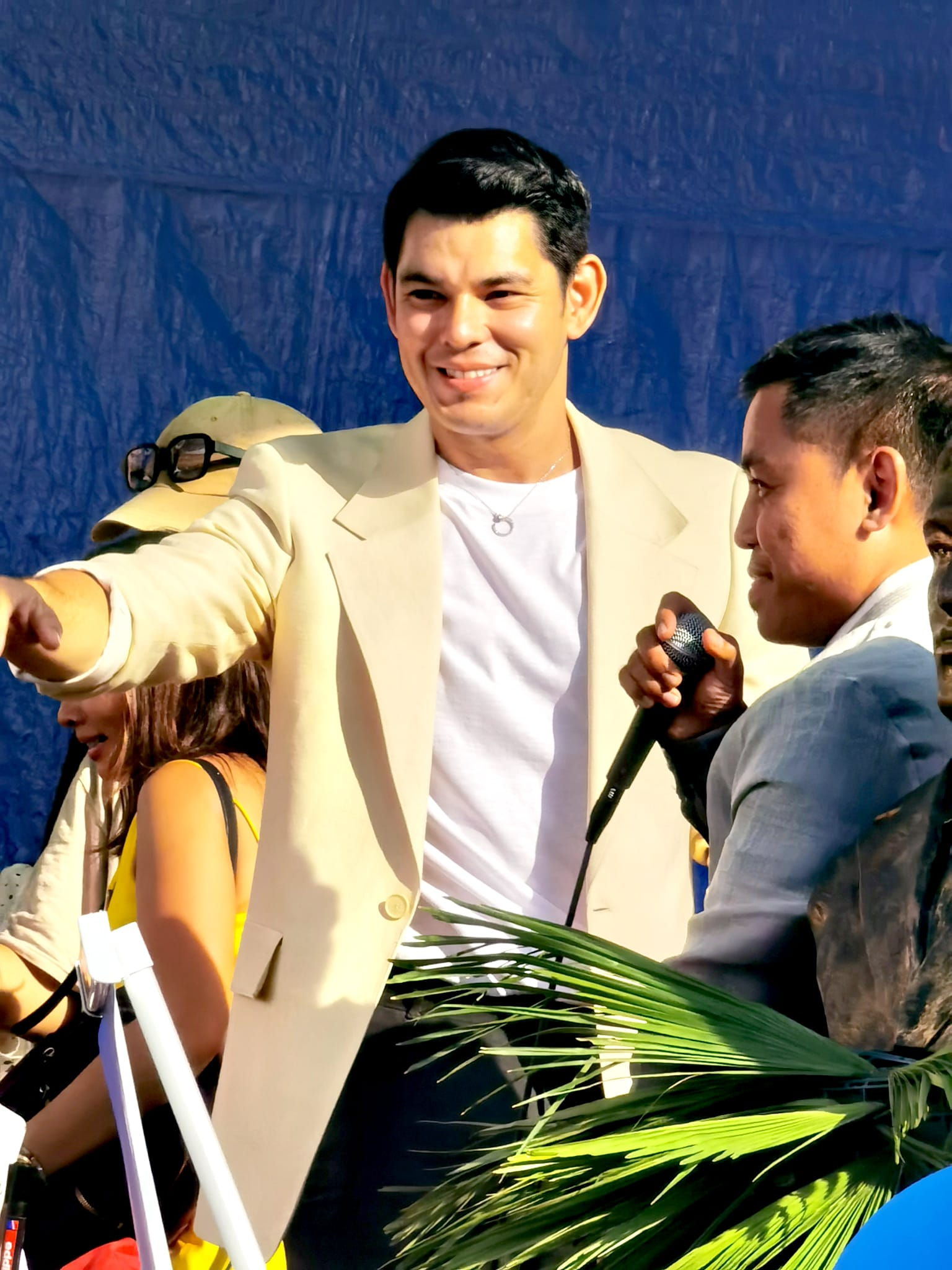
Richard Gutierrez

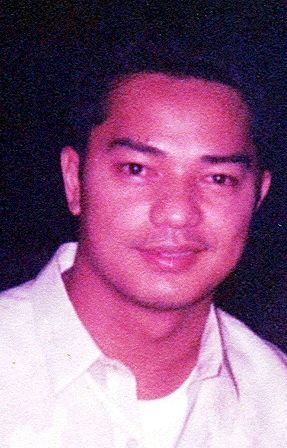
Ariel Rivera

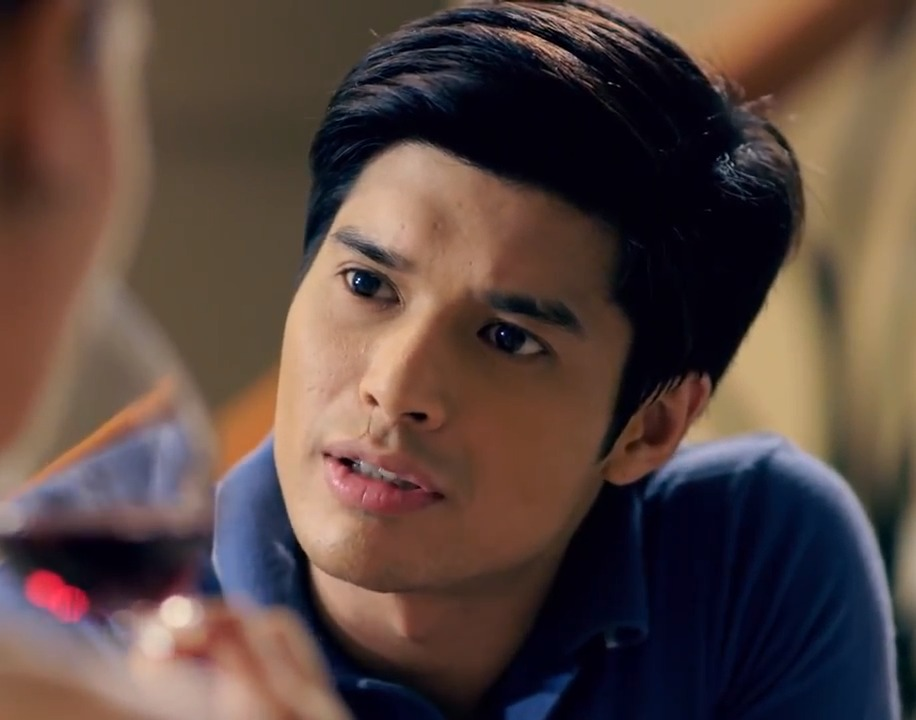
JC de Vera

Lead cast

- Richard Gutierrez as Amante / Miguel / Conde Vergonze

Supporting cast

- Amy Austria as Graciela
- Ariel Rivera as Samuel
- Gardo Versoza as Apo Abukay
- Leo Martinez as Francis
- Boots Anson-Roa as Adela
- Luz Valdez as Giray
- Paolo Contis as Adan
- Chynna Ortaleza as Rebecca
- Ramon Christopher as Guillermo
- Emilio Garcia as Luis
- Yayo Aguila as Anita
- John Arcilla as Romeo
- Lorna Tolentino as Amelia
- Isabel Oli as Isabel
- Gabby Eigenmann as Crisanto
- Richard Quan as Bernie
- Stella Ruiz
- Francine Prieto
- JC de Vera as James
- Julianne Lee
- Dion Ignacio as Dario
- LJ Reyes as Dorina
- Mike Tan as Peping
- John Medina
- Ken Punzalan
- Paolo Serano

Guest cast

- Ronaldo Valdez as Arando
- Jestoni Alarcon as Rodolfo
- Sherilyn Reyes as Garela
- Joe Chen as Mei Li
- Alicia Mayer as Sontaya
- Teddy Corpuz as Pikoy
- Miguel Tanfelix as Onyok
- Dionne De Guzman as Benilda
- Joanne Quintas
- Ryan Yllana as Balgog
- Bianca King
- Ruffa Gutierrez
- Nina Ricci Alagao as Babaylan
- Michael De Mesa as Gayoso
- Elvis Gutierrez
- James Blanco as Topel
- Joonee Gamboa as Apo Adlaw
- T-mur Lane Lee as Enchong
- Christian Vasquez as Karuma
- Goyong as Anigma
- Dick Israel as Tanok
