= Dion Ignacio =

Filipino actor and musician

- Born: Dion Joseph Ignacio; March 28, 1986 (age 40); Siniloan, Laguna, Philippines
- Occupations: Actor; musician; model
- Years active: 2003–present
- Agent(s): Sparkle GMA Artist Center (since 2003)
- Height: 1.85 m (6 ft 1 in)
- Spouse: Aileen Sison (m. 2021)
- Children: 2

Dion Joseph Ignacio (born March 28, 1986) is a Filipino actor and musician. Popularly known of his role as Raul Agoncillo in the afternoon soap opera Saan Darating ang Umaga?, a role originally portrayed by former 1980s teen idol Raymond Lauchengco, but his most notable role in TV is in the afternoon drama Magdalena, where he is paired with Bela Padilla.

Ignacio is also the rhythm guitarist of the rock band Philia with Arci Muñoz as their lead vocalist.

== Biography ==
Ignacio entered Philippine show business after joining StarStruck. He is one of the StarStruck Avengers. Though he wasn't to bag the Ultimate Survivor title, Ignacio shows off his guitar skills as the bassist of the All Star Band, and with a movie together with TV guestings. He played various roles like playing a villain, leading man or supporting character in various shows. Ignacio was also a member of Studs, an all-male group.

=== Career ===
As of 2008, his biggest break is playing a leading man to Yasmien Kurdi in Sine Novela, Saan Darating ang Umaga?. He is now immortalizing a role originally portrayed by Rustom Padilla (now known as BB Gandanghari) in the new Sine Novela Ngayon at Kailanman. Ignacio joined the cast of My Lover, My Wife in 2011 co-starring Maxene Magalona and Nadine Samonte.

=== As a musician ===
Ignacio is formerly a part of Filipino hard rock band Philia as rhythm guitarist.

== Personal life ==
Ignacio married his longtime, non-showbiz girlfriend Aileen Sison on March 28, 2021 at Viridis Countryside garden in Cavite. The couple are blessed with two children, their first child, Dylanne Jailee was born in 2018 and their second child, Creighton was born in 2021.

Ignacio and his wife are Baptized Christians, the couple had their water baptism facilitated by Pastor Bodie Cruz on December 27, 2021.

== Filmography ==
=== Film ===
Year	Title	Role
2004	Kilig... Pintig... Yanig...	
2005	Hari ng Sablay	Billie
2005	Happily Ever After	
2005	Mulawin: The Movie	Tayag
2006	Moments of Love	Kiko
2006	I Wanna Be Happy	
2008	Desperadas 2	Paul
2009	Patient X	Samuel
2014	Basement	Mendoza
2016	Vampire Transformation: Usapang Vampire na 'yan!	Sensei Robert Ba
2023	Voltes V: Legacy – The Cinematic Experience	Obgen

=== Television ===
Year	Title	Role(s)	Ref.
2003–04	StarStruck	Himself	
2003–04	Stage 1: The Starstruck Playhouse	Various	
2004	SOP Gigsters	Himself / Performer	
2004	Stage 1: Live		
2004–05	Joyride	Brix	
2004–05	Love to Love	Dale	
2005–06	Sugo	Dario	
2006	Magpakailanman	Jonas	
2006–07	Captain Barbell	Askoboy Vice Captain	
2006	Now and Forever: Linlang	Danny Villamonte	
2006–07	Carlo J. Caparas' Bakekang	Aldrin Sandoval	
2006–07	Makita Ka Lang Muli		
2007	Fantastic Man: Ikalawang Laban	Dexter / Fire Man (Season 2)	
2007–08	Zaido: Pulis Pangkalawakan	Thor Mentor	
2007–08	Daisy Siete Season 17: Uling-ling	Arthur	
2008	Babangon Ako't Dudurugin Kita	Pablo	
2008–09	Sine Novela: Saan Darating ang Umaga?	Raul Agoncillo	
2009	SRO Cinemaserye: Eva Castillo Story	Jimboy	
2009	Sine Novela: Ngayon at Kailanman	Dags De Leon	
2010	Sine Novela: Ina, Kasusuklaman Ba Kita?	Rav Montenegro-Asuncion	
2010	Diva	Jay-Z	
2011	My Lover, My Wife	Jordan Castro	
2011	Amaya	Kuling	
2012	The Good Daughter	Paul Noche	
2012–13	Magdalena: Anghel sa Putikan	Abel Soriano	
2013	Maghihintay Pa Rin	Orlando "Orly" Ramirez	
2014	Innamorata	Dencio I. Manansala	
2015	Kailan Ba Tama ang Mali?	Oliver Mallari	
2015–16	Marimar	Nicandro Mejia	
2016	Magkaibang Mundo	Jeffrey Dizon	
2016	Magpakailanman: Kadugo, Kaaway, Kakampi	Raymond	
2017	Mulawin vs. Ravena	Siklab	
2017	Magpakailanman: Kambal na Pagmamahal	Jak / Jill	
2018	Victor Magtanggol	Percival 'Perci' Domingo	
2019	Hiram na Anak	Adrian Sandejo	
2019	The Gift	Ex Boyfriend	
2019–21	Magkaagaw	Zander Rodriguez	
2021	The World Between Us	Franco Libradilla	
2021	To Have & to Hold	Ian Lobangco	
2022	I Can See You: AlterNate	Body double of Dingdong Dantes	
2022	Bolera	young Joma Fajardo	
2023	Abot-Kamay na Pangarap	Bart	
2023	Luv Is: Caught in His Arms	Samuel Almero	
2023	Voltes V: Legacy	Obgen	
2023	Royal Blood	Andrew Castor	
2024	Walang Matigas na Pulis sa Matinik na Misis	Blake	
2025	Mommy Dearest	Danilo Joseco	
2026	Sanggang-Dikit FR	Mr. Ignacio	

== Awards and nominations ==
Year	Award	Category	Nominated work	Result	Ref.
2022	3rd Annual TAG Awards Chicago	Best Supporting Actor	I Can See You: AlterNate	Nominated	
2022	Gintong Parangal 2022	Natatanging Gintong Parangal bilang Mahusay na Aktor sa Telebisyon	I Can See You: AlterNate	Won	
