= Pinoy Records =

Philippine television infotainment show

- Title card
- Genre: Infotainment
- Directed by: Rico Guttierrez
- Presented by: Manny Pacquiao; Chris Tiu; Sheena Halili
- Opening theme: "Pambansang Kamao" by D-Coy and Beatmathics
- Country of origin: Philippines
- Original language: Tagalog
- No. of episodes: 135

Production
- Executive producer: Wilma Galvante
- Camera setup: Multiple-camera setup
- Running time: 60 minutes
- Production company: GMA Entertainment TV

Original release
- Network: GMA Network
- Release: December 8, 2007 – July 17, 2010

Pinoy Records (transl. Filipino records) is a Philippine television infotainment show broadcast by GMA Network. Hosted by Manny Pacquiao, Chris Tiu and Sheena Halili, it premiered on December 8, 2007. The show concluded on July 17, 2010, with a total of 135 episodes.

== Hosts ==
Hosts

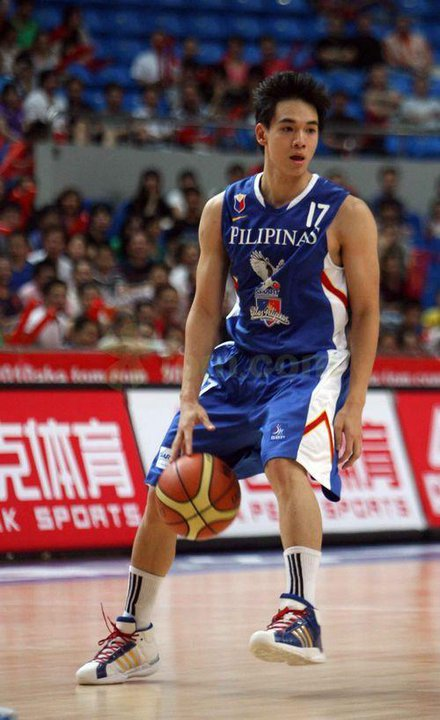
Chris Tiu

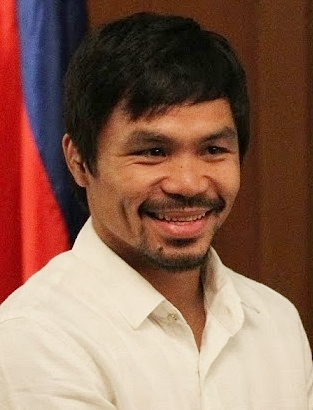
Manny Pacquiao

- Manny Pacquiao
- Chris Tiu
- Sheena Halili
- Jai Reyes (Face Your Fear segment host)
- Bearwin Meily (Totoong Magic segment host)

Guest hosts

- Rhian Ramos
- Iza Calzado
- Kris Bernal

== Ratings ==
According to AGB Nielsen Philippines' Mega Manila People/Individual television ratings, the final episode of Pinoy Records scored a 7.8% rating.

== Accolades ==
Accolades received by Pinoy Records
Year	Award	Category	Recipient	Result	Ref.
2008	22nd PMPC Star Awards for Television	Best Reality Competition Program	Pinoy Records	Nominated	
2008	22nd PMPC Star Awards for Television	Best Reality Competition Program Host	Manny Pacquiao Chris Tiu	Nominated	
2009	23rd PMPC Star Awards for Television	Best Reality Program	Pinoy Records	Nominated	
2009	23rd PMPC Star Awards for Television	Best Reality Program Host	Manny Pacquiao Chris Tiu	Nominated	
2010	24th PMPC Star Awards for Television	Best Reality Program	Pinoy Records	Nominated	
2010	24th PMPC Star Awards for Television	Best Reality Program Host	Manny Pacquiao Chris Tiu	Nominated	
