= Pati Ba Pintig ng Puso =

2007 Philippine television drama series

- Title card
- Also known as: Of Love and Lies
- Genre: Romantic drama
- Created by: Helen Meriz
- Based on: Pati Ba Pintig ng Puso (1985) by Leroy Salvador
- Written by: Luningning Interino-Ribay; Kit Villanueva-Langit
- Directed by: Gil Tejada Jr.
- Creative director: Roy Iglesias
- Starring: Yasmien Kurdi; JC de Vera
- Theme music composer: Willy Cruz
- Opening theme: "Pati Ba Pintig ng Puso?" by Yasmien Kurdi
- Country of origin: Philippines
- Original language: Tagalog
- No. of episodes: 80

Production
- Executive producer: Joseph Buncalan
- Camera setup: Multiple-camera setup
- Running time: 25–35 minutes
- Production company: GMA Entertainment TV

Original release
- Network: GMA Network
- Release: May 21 – September 7, 2007

Pati Ba Pintig ng Puso? (transl. even the pulse of the heart? / international title: Of Love and Lies) is a 2007 Philippine television drama romance series broadcast by GMA Network. Based on a 1985 Philippine film of the same title, the series is the second instalment of Sine Novela. Directed by Gil Tejada Jr., it stars Yasmien Kurdi and JC de Vera. It premiered on May 21, 2007 on the network's Dramarama sa Hapon line up. The series concluded on September 7, 2007, with a total of 80 episodes.

== Cast and characters ==
Cast

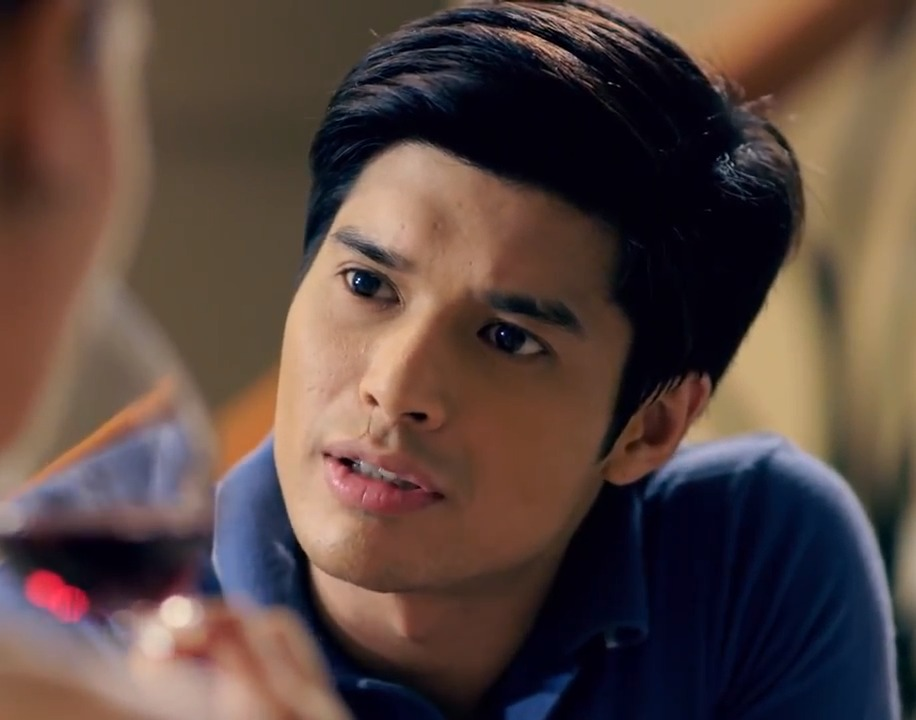
JC de Vera

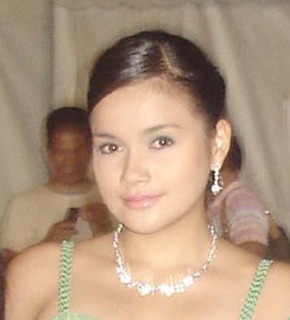
Yasmien Kurdi

Lead cast

- JC de Vera as Aldrin Griego
- Yasmien Kurdi as Jenna

Supporting cast

- Eddie Gutierrez as Griego
- Chynna Ortaleza as Mabel
- Karel Marquez as Agatha
- Arci Muñoz as Claire
- Jennifer Sevilla as Rosa
- Marco Alcaraz as Bien
- Pinky Amador as Nena
- Kier Legaspi as Franco
- Maureen Larrazabal as Betty
- Marcus Madrigal as Jeffrey
- Karen delos Reyes as Sosima
- Sweet Ramos as Kaykay
- Ramon Christopher Gutierrez as Ricardo

Guest cast

- Bea Binene as younger Jenna
- Miguel Tanfelix as younger Aldrin
- Krystal Reyes as younger Claire
- Ella Guevara as younger Betty

== Production ==
Principal photography commenced on May 2, 2007.
