= Linlang (2006 TV series) =

2006 Philippine television drama series

- Also known as: Deception
- Genre: Drama thriller
- Developed by: Don Michael Perez
- Written by: Don Michael Perez; Kit Villanueva-Langit; Des Garbes-Severino; Luningning Interio-Ribay
- Directed by: Mac Alejandre
- Creative director: Roy Iglesias
- Starring: Lorna Tolentino; Rudy Fernandez
- Theme music composer: Vince de Jesus
- Opening theme: "Now and Forever" by Kyla
- Country of origin: Philippines
- Original language: Tagalog
- No. of episodes: 45

Production
- Executive producer: Camille Pengson
- Camera setup: Multiple-camera setup
- Running time: 30 minutes
- Production company: GMA Entertainment TV

Original release
- Network: GMA Network
- Release: July 24 – September 22, 2006

Linlang (trans. / international title: Deception) is a 2006 Philippine television drama thriller series broadcast by GMA Network. The series is the sixth installment of Now and Forever. Directed by Mac Alejandre, it stars Lorna Tolentino and Rudy Fernandez. It premiered on July 24, 2006. The series concluded on September 22, 2006, with a total of 45 episodes.

== Cast and characters ==
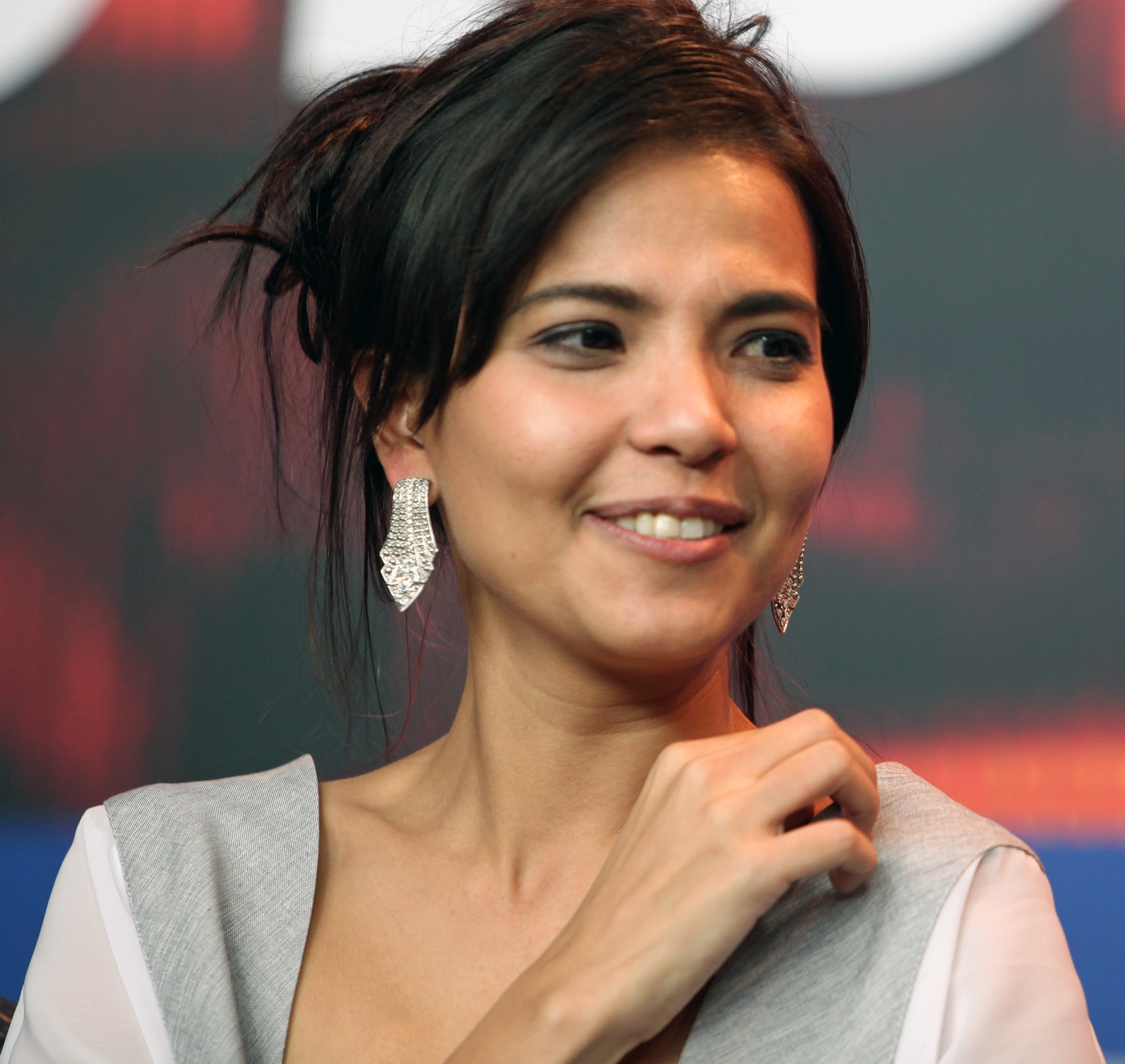
Alessandra De Rossi portrays Brenda Villareal.

Lead cast

- Lorna Tolentino as Lorena Castrillo
- Rudy Fernandez as Arman Barrinuevo

Supporting cast

- Chanda Romero as Gina Dimaano
- Chynna Ortaleza as Jane Vergara
- Dion Ignacio as Danny Villamonte
- Polo Ravales as Paolo Ramos
- Miguel Tanfelix as Pepe Javier
- Antonio Aquitania as Samuel Reyes
- Alessandra De Rossi as Brenda Villarreal
- Efren Reyes, Jr. as Boyong Calderon
- Terence Baylon as Ricky Sebastian-Valdez
- Eva Darren as Sister Stella
- Diana Zubiri as Divina Agustin
- Kyle Danielle Ocampo as Maddie Reyes
