= Saan Darating ang Umaga? =

Philippine television drama series

- Title card
- Also known as: Morning Awaits
- Genre: Drama
- Based on: Saan Darating ang Umaga? (1983) by Maryo J. de los Reyes
- Written by: Anna Aleta Nadela; Marides Garbes-Severino
- Directed by: Maryo J. de los Reyes
- Starring: Yasmien Kurdi
- Theme music composer: George Canseco
- Opening theme: "Saan Darating ang Umaga?" by Yasmien Kurdi
- Country of origin: Philippines
- Original language: Tagalog
- No. of episodes: 80

Production
- Executive producer: Camille Gomba-Montaño
- Camera setup: Multiple-camera setup
- Running time: 25–35 minutes
- Production company: GMA Entertainment TV

Original release
- Network: GMA Network
- Release: November 10, 2008 – February 27, 2009

Saan Darating ang Umaga? (transl. where will the morning come? / international title: Morning Awaits) is a Philippine television drama series broadcast by GMA Network. Based on a 1983 Philippine film of the same title, the series is the eleventh instalment of Sine Novela. Directed by Maryo J. de los Reyes, it stars Yasmien Kurdi. It premiered on November 10, 2008 on the network's Dramarama sa Hapon line up. The series concluded on February 27, 2009, with a total of 80 episodes.

== Cast and characters ==
Cast

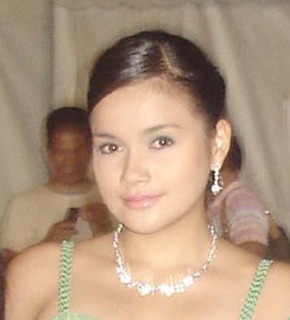
Yasmien Kurdi

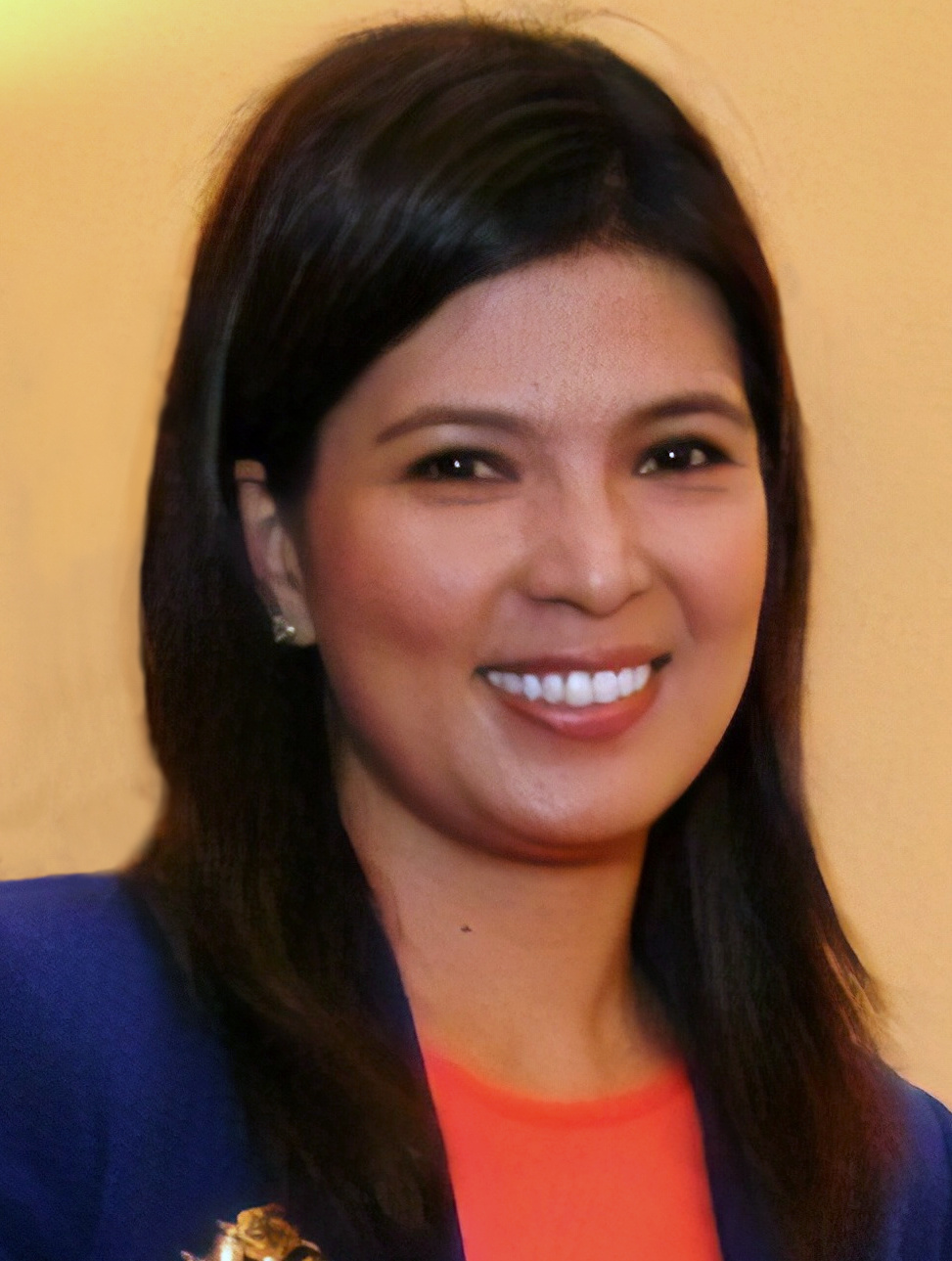
Lani Mercado

Lead cast

- Yasmien Kurdi as Shayne Rodrigo

Supporting cast

- Lani Mercado as Lorrie Rodrigo
- Joel Torre as Ruben Rodrigo
- Jacob Rica as Joel Rodrigo
- Dion Ignacio as Raul Agoncillo
- Andrea del Rosario as Patricia Bernales
- Gary Estrada as Dindo Rodrigo
- Pinky Amador as Agatha Rodrigo
- Charlie Davao as Leonardo Rodrigo
- Shirley Fuentes as Marinel "Mylene" Medina Michikawa / Rose
- Arci Muñoz as Bianca
- Luz Valdez as Sabel
- Vaness del Moral as Donna

Guest cast

- Deborah Sun as Melody Valera / Bea Torralba
- Nicole Dulalia as younger Shayne
- Gay Balignasay as Acy
- Lui Manansala as Olive
- Joseph Bitangcol as Mark

== Ratings ==
According to AGB Nielsen Philippines' Mega Manila household television ratings, the pilot episode of Saan Darating ang Umaga? earned a 22.3% rating. The final episode scored a 23.4% rating.

== Accolades ==
Accolades received by Saan Darating ang Umaga?
Year	Award	Category	Recipient	Result	Ref.
2009	23rd PMPC Star Awards for Television	Best Daytime Drama Series	Saan Darating ang Umaga?	Nominated	
