= John Medina =

John Medina may refer to:

- John Medina (molecular biologist)
- John Medina (actor)
- John Medina (footballer)
- John Baptist Medina (1659–1710), artist of Flemish-Spanish origin who worked in England and Scotland
