= Yasmien Kurdi =

Filipino actress and singer (born 1989)

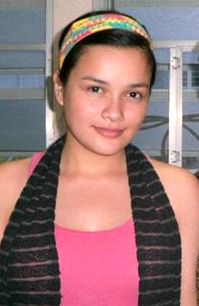
- Kurdi in 2011
- Born: Yasmien Yuson Kurdi; January 25, 1989 (age 37); San Juan, Philippines
- Education: Arellano University (BA)
- Occupations: Actress; singer
- Years active: 2002–present
- Label: GMA Music
- Spouse: Rey Soldevilla Jr. (m. 2012)
- Children: 2

Yasmien Yuson Kurdi-Soldevilla (Tagalog: [ˈjasmin (jasˈmin) ˈkəɹdi]; born January 25, 1989) is a Filipino actress and singer. She rose to prominence as a contestant in the first season of StarStruck (2003–2004), a reality-based talent search show on GMA Network, where she finished as the first runner-up.

Kurdi gained further prominence in television, portraying Mira on the fantasy series Encantadia (2005), Salve Dizon de Leon on the remake of Babangon Ako't Dudurugin Kita (2008), Shayne Rodrigo on the remake of Saan Darating ang Umaga? (2008–2009), Angela on Rhodora X (2014), Dolores on the afternoon drama series Yagit (2014), and Ysabel on Sa Piling ni Nanay (2016–2017).

As a singer, Kurdi released two studio albums. Her first album, In the Name of Love, was released in 2006 and attained platinum status, while in 2007, her second album, Love Is All I Need, reached gold status.

== Early life ==
Yasmien Yuson Kurdi was born to a Muslim father, Mohammad Kurdi, and Miriam Ong-Yuson, who is a member of Iglesia ni Cristo. She is of Lebanese and Chinese Filipino (maternal) descent. She spent most of her early life in Kuwait because of her father's work there, and was there with her family during the Gulf War. She was a member of the junior choir in her church before joining StarStruck.

She studied elementary in Jabriya Indian School, high school in Angelicum College and graduated magna cum laude with a degree of political science in Arellano University.

== Career ==
=== 2002–2006: Starstruck, career beginnings, and In The Name of Love ===
Her early career included modeling for Candy, Seventeen, and MOD magazine. She was one of the finalists in ABS-CBN's ASAP Pond's Soft Skin Search, but lost to the Jaboom twins.

=== 2007–2011: Breakthrough and Love Is All I Need ===
In May 2007, after her success in the Bakekang series as "Charming", Kurdi starred in Pati Ba Pintig ng Puso with JC de Vera. She played Jenna, a maid who has an eye on her employer's grandson. In its press conference, GMA Network crowned her as its GMA Drama Princess. On September 10, 2007, Kurdi starred again with JC de Vera in Pasan Ko ang Daigdig, which originally starred Sharon Cuneta in 1987. After their huge success as a loveteam in Pati Ba Pintig ng Puso, GMA cast them both in Sine Novela.

The network gave them an adaptation of another Sharon Cuneta movie, Babangon Ako't Dudurugin Kita. The series crushed its rival My Girl. In the last quarter of 2008, Kurdi led the remake of Saan Darating ang Umaga? which garnered prime time ratings, though it aired in the afternoon. The Sine Novela is a top rater and the all-time highest in national TV ratings, never beaten by Dapat Ka Bang Mahalin? which held the Mega Manila only.

Kurdi then appeared on Dear Friend: Madrasta, which topped the weekend daytime ratings. She then starred in SRO Cinemaserye's suspense drama Suspetsa.

In 2010, Kurdi was cast in her first role as a villain, on the GMA Network fairy tale television series Grazilda.

=== 2011–2017: Rising popularity ===
In 2011, Kurdi joined the epic series Amaya for a multi-episode guest arc playing Apila, she then quit show business to concentrate on her college education and raising a family, coming back in 2013 after a two-year hiatus. Recently, she starred in the hit afternoon drama series Sa Piling ni Nanay where she played a surrogate mother.

=== 2018: Critical acclaim ===
In 2018, after a year-long hiatus, Kurdi returned to television by starring on Hindi Ko Kayang Iwan Ka. Her role earned her a Best Drama Actress award at the 32nd PMPC Star Awards for Television.

== Personal life ==
In 2013, Kurdi revealed to Philippine Entertainment Portal that she had married pilot Rey Soldevilla on January 25, 2012, her 23rd birthday. They have two daughters together, one born in 2012 and another born in 2024.

Since 2025, Kurdi has been studying law at Arellano University.

=== Health ===
In early 2014, Kurdi was diagnosed with a cyst on her vocal folds, which explained hoarseness in her voice. She was scheduled for surgery in July 2014 to remove the cyst. According to her doctor, there was no guarantee that her voice would fully recover after the operation.

== Filmography ==
=== Film ===
Year	Title	Role	Notes
2004	Aishite Imasu 1941: Mahal Kita	Senyang	
2004	So Happy Together	Raphie	
2005	Lovestruck	Jojo	
2005	Happily Ever After	Jenny	
2005	Shake, Rattle & Roll 2k5	Leila	
2006	Pitong Dalagita	Mayo	
2007	Bahay Kubo: A Pinoy Mano Po!	Dahlia	
2008	Loving You	Lane Cruz	

=== Television ===
Year	Title	Role
2002-2003	ASAP	Herself
2003–2004	StarStruck	Herself
2004	Stage 1: Live!	Herself
2004	Stage 1: The StarStruck Playhouse	Herself
2004	Click	Leilani
2004	Click Barkada Hunt	Herself
2004–2010	SOP Rules	Herself
2004–2006	SOP Gigsters	Herself
2004–2005	Joyride	Rene / Irene
2005	Encantadia	Mira
2005	Love To Love (Season 6): Wish Upon A Jar	Neneng
2005–2007	Hokus Pokus	Jackie
2006	Bleach	Rukia Kuchiki
2006	Now and Forever: Tinig	Victoria / Ikay
2006–2007	Carlo J. Caparas' Bakekang	Charming Maisog / Lokresha / Karisma
2007	Sine Novela: Pati Ba Pintig ng Puso	Jenna
2007–2008	Sine Novela: Pasan Ko ang Daigdig	Lupe Velez
2008	Bleach: Season 2	Rukia Kuchiki
2008	Babangon Ako't Dudurugin Kita	Salve Dizon
2008	Carlo J. Caparas' Tasya Fantasya	Tasya
2008–2009	Sine Novela: Saan Darating ang Umaga?	Shayne Rodrigo
2009	SRO Cinemaserye: Suspetsa	Leonor
2009	Dear Friend: Madrasta	Princess / Shiela Gomez
2009	All My Life	Princess
2010	Pilyang Kerubin	Hannah
2010–2011	Grazilda	Cindy
2011–2012	Amaya	Apila
2013	Anna Karenina	Margarita "Maggie" Monteclaro
2014	Rhodora X	Angela Ferrer
2014–2015	Yagit	Dolores "Dolor" Macabuhay-Guison
2015	Magpakailanman: Nuno Sa Punso	Flor
2016	Wagas	Mitch
2016—2017	Sa Piling ni Nanay	Ysabel Salvacion / Zeny
2017	Dear Uge	Mylene
2017	Tadhana	Connie
2017	Magpakailanman: Anak Mo, Anak Ko, Anak Natin	Mary Jane
2018	Hindi Ko Kayang Iwan Ka	Thea Balagtas-Angeles
2018	Dear Uge: Beki Boyfie	Mina
2018	Magpakailanman: The Haunted Wife	Inday
2018–2019	Cain at Abel	young Belen Castillo
2019	Hiram na Anak	Miren Alonta-Sandejo
2019–2020	Beautiful Justice	Alicia "Alice" Santos-Vida
2020	I Can See You: The Promise	Clarisse Agoncillo
2021–2022	Las Hermanas	Dorothy Manansala-Lucero
2022	Start-Up PH	Katrina "Ina" Cortez Sison/Diaz
2023	The Missing Husband	Millicent "Millie" Soriano-Rosales
2025	It's Showtime	Herself
2026	Taskforce Firewall	

== Discography ==
In 2005, Kurdi released her first album, In the Name of Love, under GMA Records. She released her first single, "I Know" (which was used as a Filipino soundtrack of the Korean teledrama Sweet 18 aired by GMA), followed by "In the Name of Love" and "Umaambisyon" in the same year. In 2007 she released her second album, Love Is All I Need, which included the singles "Candlelight Romance", "Goodbye", "Kisapmata", "One Day", "Take It or Leave It", "Even If" and "Love Is All I Need".

=== Albums ===
Title	Details	Peak chart positions			
Title	Details	PH	PH Hit	PH Heat	PH Indie
In the Name of Love	Release date: July 9, 2005; Label: GMA Records; Formats: CD, music download	6	19	10	15
Love Is All I Need	Release date: May 2007; Label: GMA Records; Formats: CD, music download	10	23	17	21

=== Singles ===
Year	Single	Album
2005	"I Know"	In the Name of Love
2005	"In the Name of Love"	In the Name of Love
2005	"Umaambisyon"	In the Name of Love
2006	"Patuloy Parin"	In the Name of Love
2007	"Kisapmata"	Love Is All I Need
2007	"Love Is All I Need"	Love Is All I Need
2008	"Take It or Leave It"	Love Is All I Need
2008	"One Day"	Love Is All I Need
2008	"Goodbye"	Love Is All I Need

=== Compilation and soundtrack appearances ===
Song	Album title
"I Know"	Kahimig Videoke Series Vol.1
"In the Name of Love", "Umaambisyon"	Kahimig Videoke Series Vol.2
"It’s Just Another New Year’s Eve"	Kapuso Sa Pasko
"Pintig Ng Puso", "Ngayong Wala Ka Na"	Ngayong Wala Ka Na
"I Know", "In the Name of Love"	Mga Awit Mula Sa Puso
"I Know"	Lovestruck (soundtrack album)
"Pasan Ko ang Daigdig", "In the Name of Love"	Mga Awit Kapuso Vol. 4

==== Music videos ====
Year	Title	Director(s)
2005	"I Know"	Marco Yanig
2005	"In the Name of Love"	Jun Lana
2005	"Patuloy Pa Rin"	Eric Quezon
2007	"Love Is All I Need"	Mark J. Delos Reyes
2008	"Take It or Leave It"	Joel Lamangan

== Awards and nominations ==
Year	Award giving body	Category	Nominated work	Results
2004	Click 18th PMPC Star Awards for Television	Best New Female TV Personality	—N/a	Nominated
2005	GMMSF Box-Office Entertainment Awards	Most Promising Female Singer	—N/a	Won
2006	IFM Pinoy Music Awards	Breakthrough Singer of the Year	—N/a	Won
2006	IFM Pinoy Music Awards	Song of the Year	In the Name of Love	Won
2006	MYX Music Awards	Favorite New Artist	—N/a	Won
2006	Philippine Association of the Record Industry	Platinum Record Award	In the Name of Love	Won
2007	Philippine Association of the Record Industry	Gold Record Award	Love Is All I Need	Won
2014	28th PMPC Star Awards for Television	Best Single Performance by an Actress	Magpakailanman: Nalunod na Pag-asa: The Cebu Ship Collision	Nominated
2018	32nd PMPC Star Awards for Television	Best Drama Actress	Hindi Ko Kayang Iwan Ka	Won
2019	33rd PMPC Star Awards for Television	Best Single Performance by an Actress	Tadhana	Won
2019	33rd PMPC Star Awards for Television	Best Drama Actress	Hiram na Anak	Nominated

Awards and achievements
Preceded by New	StarStruck; Runner-up; 2003 (season 1)	Succeeded by LJ Reyes
