= Sine Novela =

Philippine television series

- Title card from May 2007 to February 2010
- Genre: Drama
- Country of origin: Philippines
- Original language: Tagalog
- No. of episodes: 1,727 (list of episodes)

Production
- Executive producers: Camille Gomba-Montaño; Joseph Buncalan; Kaye Atienza-Cadsawan; Mona Coles-Mayuga
- Camera setup: Multiple-camera setup
- Running time: 25-35 minutes
- Production company: GMA Entertainment TV

Original release
- Network: GMA Network
- Release: April 30, 2007 – October 22, 2010

Sine Novela (transl. cinema novel) is a Philippine television drama series broadcast by GMA Network. The series is a television adaptation of the Philippine films. It premiered on April 30, 2007 on the network's Dramarama sa Hapon line up. The series concluded on October 22, 2010 with a total of 21 installments and 1,727 episodes.

== Episodes ==
Sine Novela's Bakit Kay Tagal ng Sandali? was shelved.

== Accolades ==
=== 2007 ===
21st PMPC Star Awards for Television

- Nominated, Best Actor, Carlo Aquino (Sinasamba Kita)
- Winner, Best Daytime Drama Series (Sinasamba Kita)

=== 2008 ===
22nd PMPC Star Awards for Television

- Winner, Best Daytime Drama Series - Kaputol ng Isang Awit
- Nominated, Best Daytime Drama Series - Maging Akin Ka Lamang
- Nominated, Best Daytime Drama Series - My Only Love
- Nominated, Best Drama Actor - Tirso Cruz III (Kaputol ng Isang Awit)
- Nominated, Best Drama Actress - Lovi Poe (Kaputol ng Isang Awit)

=== 2009 ===
23rd PMPC Star Awards for Television

- Nominated, Best Daytime Drama Series - Saan Darating ang Umaga?

37th International Emmy Awards

- Nominated, Best Telenovela - Saan Darating ang Umaga?

=== 2010 ===
24th PMPC Star Awards for Television

- Nominated, Best Daytime Drama Series - Kung Aagawin Mo ang Lahat sa Akin
