= List of programs broadcast by Fox Filipino =

Programs aired by Philippine TV channel

The following is a list of programs aired by Fox Filipino.

== Final programming ==
=== Drama ===
- Adarna (Note: Originally aired on GMA.)
- Adik Sa'Yo
- Ako si Kim Samsoon
- Alakdana
- All About Eve
- All My Life
- Alyas Robin Hood
- Amaya
- Ang Babaeng Hinugot sa Aking Tadyang
- Ang Dalawang Mrs. Real
- Asian Treasures
- Aso ni San Roque
- Babaeng Hampaslupa (Note: Originally aired on TV5.)
- Babangon Ako't Dudurugin Kita
- Bakekang
- Bantatay
- Beauty Queen
- Because of You
- Buena Familia
- Captain Barbell
- Carmela
- Cielo de Angelina
- Codename: Asero
- Darna
- Destiny Rose
- Dwarfina
- Dyesebel
- Encantadia (2005)
- Encantadia (2016)
- Enchanted Garden
- Endless Love
- Futbolilits
- Gagambino
- Genesis
- Glamorosa
- Grazilda
- Habang Kapiling Ka
- The Half Sisters
- Hiram na Alaala
- Iglot
- Ikaw Sana
- Ika-6 na Utos
- Ilumina
- Ilustrado
- Impostora
- Ina, Kasusuklaman Ba Kita?
- Indio
- Ismol Family
- JejeMom (Note: Currently being broadcast on GMA.)
- Joaquin Bordado
- Kamandag
- Kambal Sirena
- Katipunan
- Kaya Kong Abutin ang Langit
- Kokak
- Koreana
- La Vendetta
- The Last Prince
- Legacy
- Let the Love Begin
- Little Nanay
- Little Star
- Love & Lies
- Luna Blanca
- Luna Mystika
- Machete
- Magdusa Ka
- Magic Palayok
- Magkano Ba ang Pag-ibig?
- Majika
- Makapiling Kang Muli
- MariMar
- Mga Mata ni Anghelita
- Mulawin
- Mulawin vs. Ravena
- Muli
- Mundo Mo'y Akin
- Munting Heredera
- My Beloved
- My Destiny
- My Husband's Lover
- Nandito Ako
- Niño
- Paano Ba ang Mangarap?
- Pahiram ng Sandali
- Panday Kids
- Pati Ba Pintig ng Puso
- Pilyang Kerubin
- Poor Señorita
- Rhodora X
- Rosalinda
- Rod Santiago's The Sisters
- Sa Ngalan ng Ina
- Someone to Watch Over Me
- Spooky Nights
- Stairway to Heaven
- Sugo
- Super Twins
- Strawberry Lane
- That's My Amboy
- Temptation of Wife
- Trudis Liit
- Wagas (Note: Currently being broadcast on GMA News TV.)
- Wish I May
- Yagit

=== Anthology ===
- Case Solved
- Karelasyon

=== Comedy ===
- Bubble Gang
- Kaya ng Powers
- Pepito Manaloto

=== Foreign ===
- Alpha Dogs (Note: Also being broadcast on National Geographic Channel.)
- La Teniente
- The Fierce Wife
- It Started with a Kiss (Note: Dubbed in Filipino.)
- Snake Wranglers
- The Walking Dead (Note: Also being broadcast on FOX.)

=== Informative ===
- Camera Trap: Wild Scene Investigation
- Planet Philippines

=== Public affairs ===
- 100% Pinoy
- Balikbayan (Note: Originally aired on Q.)
- Born to Be Wild
- Biyahe ni Drew
- Pinoy Abroad
- Pinoy Meets World
- Wish Ko Lang

=== Original programming ===
- Native Tongue
