= Bukod Kang Pinagpala =

2013 Philippine television drama series

- Title card
- Also known as: Mother's Love
- Genre: Drama
- Developed by: R.J. Nuevas
- Written by: Jules Dan Katanyag; Leilani Chavez; John Borgy Danao
- Directed by: Don Michael Perez
- Creative director: Jun Lana
- Starring: Camille Prats; Mona Louise Rey
- Theme music composer: Wency Cornejo; Arnel de Pano
- Opening theme: "Nag-iisa Lang" by Rocco Nacino
- Ending theme: "Habang May Buhay" by Kyla
- Country of origin: Philippines
- Original language: Tagalog
- No. of episodes: 82

Production
- Executive producer: Winnie Hollis-Reyes
- Production locations: Tagaytay, Philippines
- Cinematography: Carlo S. Montaño
- Camera setup: Multiple-camera setup
- Running time: 30–45 minutes
- Production company: GMA Entertainment TV

Original release
- Network: GMA Network
- Release: February 11 – June 7, 2013

Bukod Kang Pinagpala (transl. you are way blessed / international title: Mother's Love) is a 2013 Philippine television drama series broadcast by GMA Network. Directed by Don Michael Perez, it stars Camille Prats and Mona Louise Rey. It premiered on February 11, 2013 on the network's Afternoon Prime line up. The series concluded on June 7, 2013, with a total of 82 episodes.

The series is streaming online on YouTube.

== Cast and characters ==
Cast

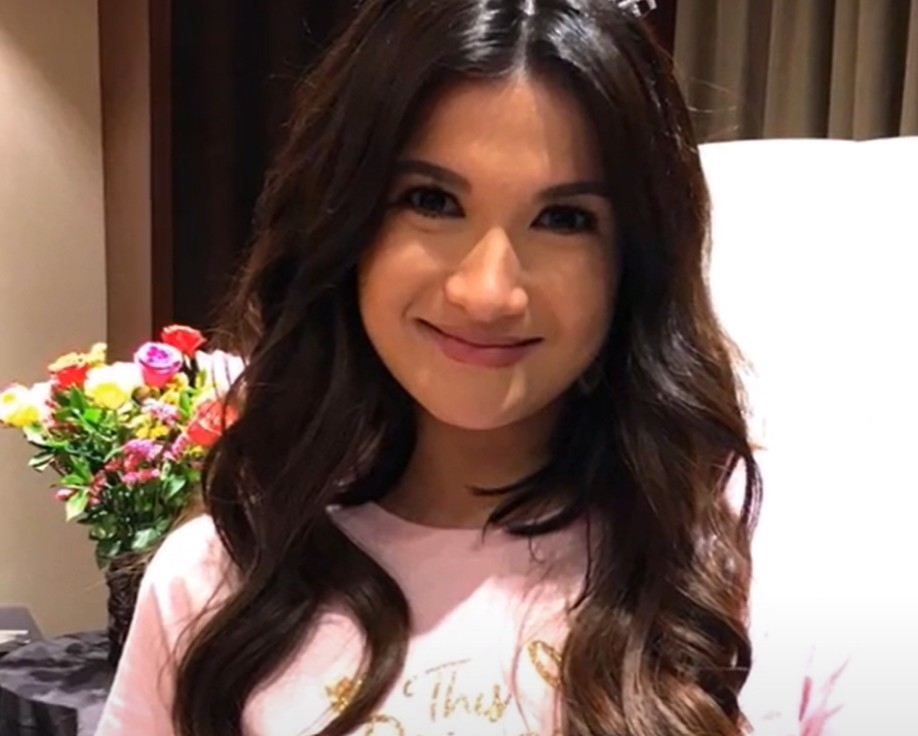
Camille Prats

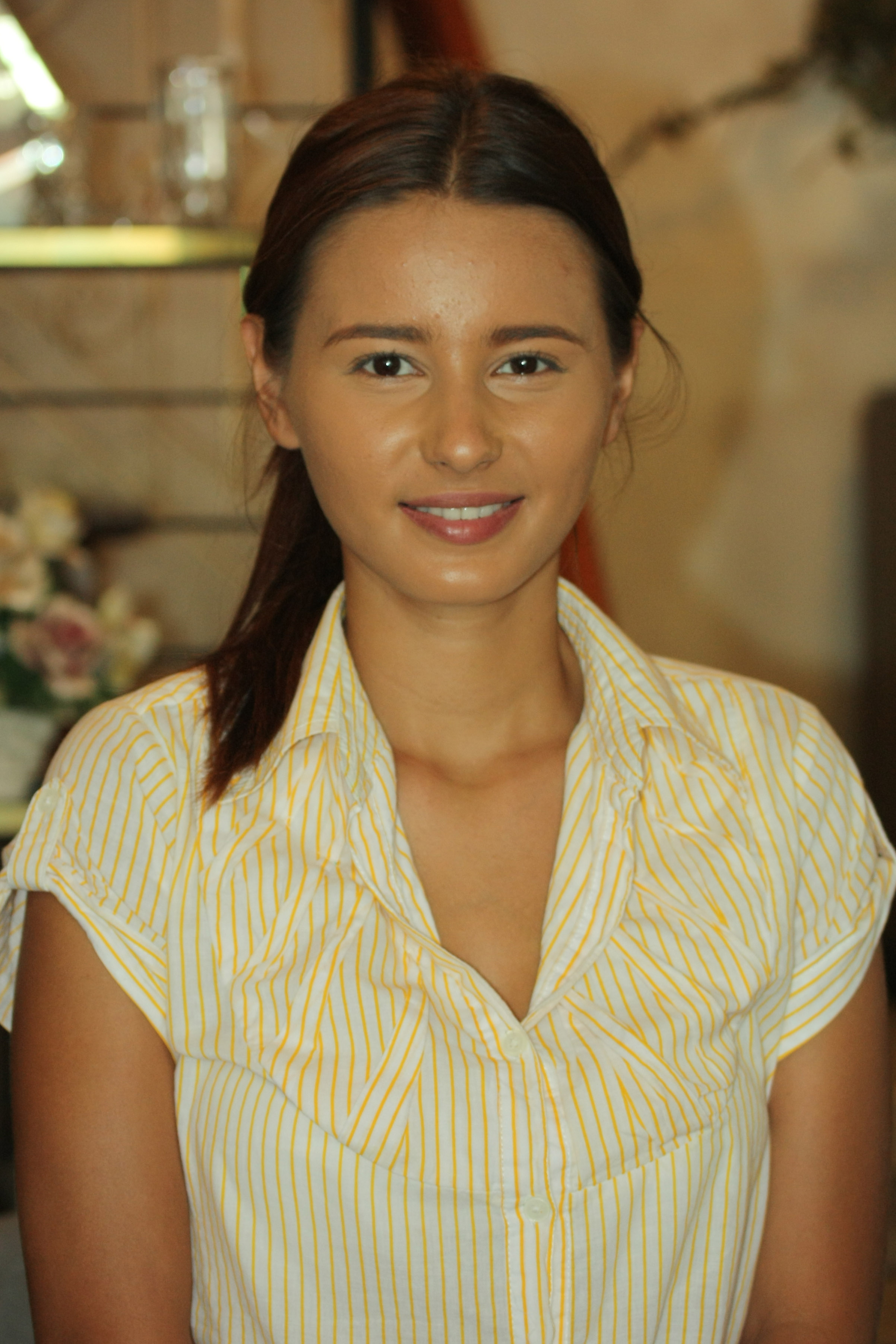
Jackie Rice

Lead cast

- Camille Prats as Bessilda "Bessie" Villerte-Alcuar
- Mona Louise Rey as Cindy Lara Villerte Alcuar

Supporting cast

- Jackie Rice as Janet Perez-Cheng
- Jennica Garcia as Ofelia "Ofe" Almazan-Alfonso
- Mark Anthony Fernandez as Leandro Alcuar
- Carl Guevara as Andrew Alfonso

Recurring cast

- Krystal Reyes as Janella Perez
- Glenda Garcia as Melinda "Miling" Almazan
- Sharmaine Suarez as Rebecca "Becca" Perez
- Frencheska Farr as Diana
- Djanin Cruz as Paula
- Jacky Woo as Genki Cheng
- Carlo Gonzales as Oscar
- Rap Fernandez as Ronald
- Menggie Cobarrubias as Ramon Alcuar
- Anna Marin as Raquel Villerte
- Zandra Summer as Amy
- Lolli Mara as Luisa Alcuar
- Marco Alcaraz as Digoy
- Arny Ross as Bella Caravide
- Lenlen Frial as Lizzy Almazan

== Development ==
From the creative engineering of RJ Nuevas, the series was conceived late 2012. Early in its development, the series was titled Tatlong Ina, Isang Anak (transl. three mothers, one child). It was changed to Bukod Kang Pinagpala (transl. you are way blessed), following its concept "the greatest kind of love is the love a mother has for her child." Winnie Hollis-Reyes served as the executive producer and Don Michael Perez assigned to direct the show.

The majority of the ensemble cast was personally chosen by the network and assembled from December 2012 to January 2013. Actresses Camille Prats, Jackie Rice and Jennica Garcia headlined the show as the three mothers fighting for the custody of a child – Lara, played by Mona Louise Rey. The said role was originally meant for Jillian Ward but later replaced by Rey because "She's more fit for the role." Mark Anthony Fernandez, who had previously worked with Prats and Rey on the 2011 television series Munting Heredera, was cast as the lead.

As the series progressed, recurring cast members appeared. Carl Guevarra, Krystal Reyes, singer-actress Frencheska Farr and Japanese actor-producer Jacky Woo joined the series. Glenda Garcia, Sharmaine Suarez and Anna Marin made several appearances throughout the series' run. Series' director Don Michael Perez stated that "despite the series' title, no "chosen" character is given more exposure than the other members of the cast, from writing to the directing."

== Production ==
Principal photography commenced on February 1, 2013. Most of the series' scenes, including the fictional "Alcuar Farm" and "Bessie's Organic Farm & Restaurant", were shot on location in Tagaytay.

== Ratings ==
According to AGB Nielsen Philippines' Mega Manila household television ratings, the pilot episode of Bukod Kang Pinagpala earned a 16.6% rating. The final episode scored a 12.4% rating.
