= Lloyd Samartino =

Filipino actor

- Born: Lloyd Samartino Jr. February 2, 1963 (age 63); Caloocan, Philippines
- Other names: John Lloyd Samartino, Lloydie, JLS
- Occupation: Actor
- Years active: 1979–present
- Spouse: Jo Ramos (m. 1992; sep. 2004)
- Children: 1
- Parents: Lloyd Samartino Sr. (father); Carmen Soriano (mother)

Lloyd Samartino Jr. (born February 2, 1963) is a Filipino actor.

== Personal life ==
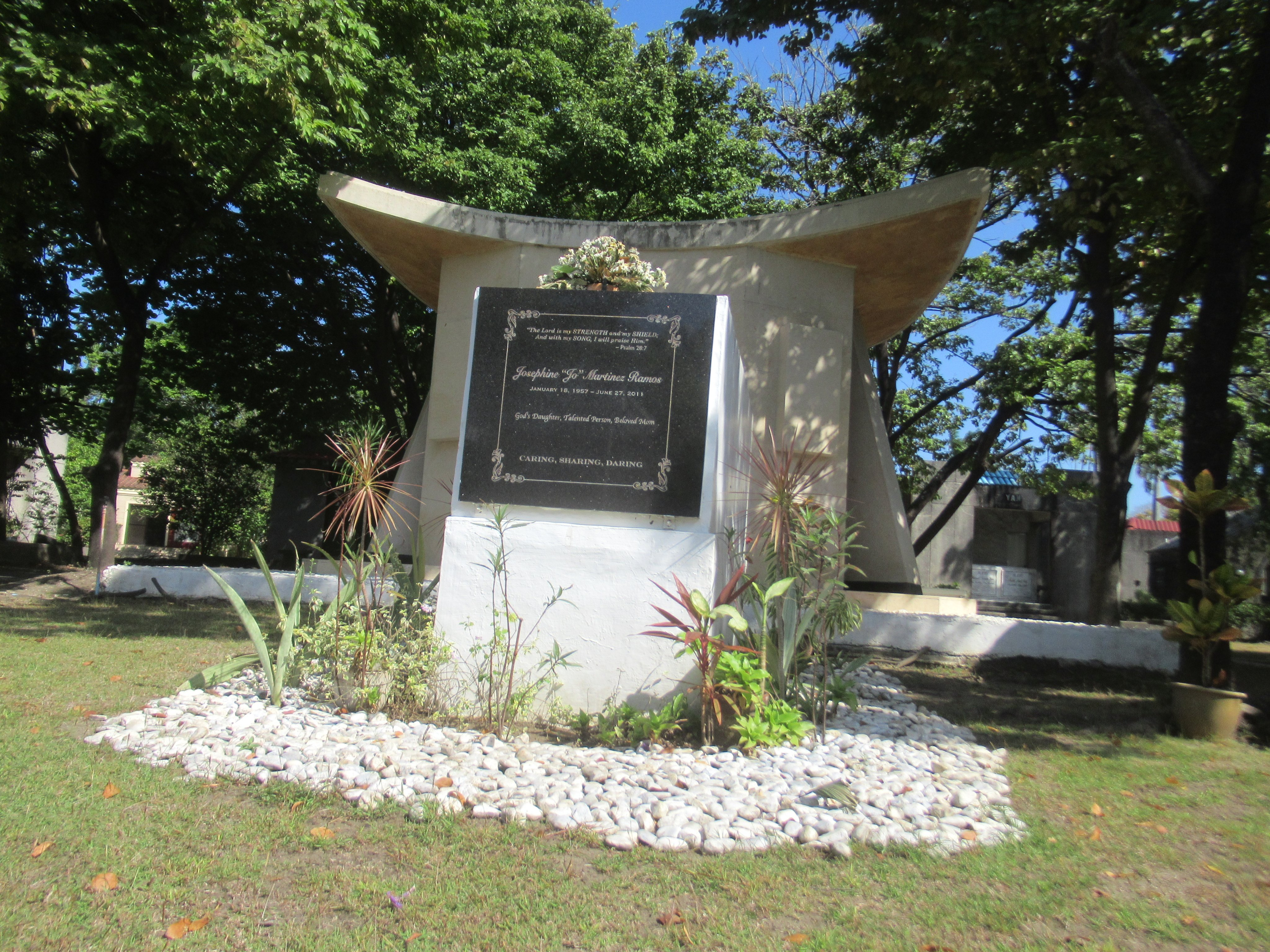
Josephine Ramos-Samartino's (wife) grave at Manila Memorial Park – Sucat.

Samartino's mother is Carmen Soriano, an actress and singer. Samartino's wife was Jo Ramos, a singer and daughter of former Philippine President Fidel V. Ramos. They have a son, Sergio.

== Career ==
Samartino started his career as a commercial model for Close-Up tooth paste in 1978. His first film appearance was Gabun: Anak Mo, Anak Ko in 1979. He became a popular matinee-idol in 1980s. Samartino has played the leading man with actresses including Nora Aunor, Vilma Santos-Recto and Rio Locsin.

== Filmography ==
=== Film ===
- Gabun: Anak Mo, Anak Ko (1979)
- Annie Batungbakal (1979)
- 4 na Maria (1980)
- Problem Child (1980)
- Good Morning Sunshine (1980)
- Salamat... Kapatid Ko! (1980)
- Unang Yakap – Roy (1980)
- Reyna ng Pitong Gatang – Joey Sta. Maria (1980)
- Bongga Ka 'Day! (1980)
- Sampaguitang Walang Halimuyak (1980)
- Totoy Boogie – Totoy Boogie (1980)
- Pag-Ibig Ko, Hatiin Ninyo (1980)
- Nakakabaliw, Nakakaaliw (1981)
- Showbiz Scandal (1981)
- Ibalik ang Swerti (1981)
- Bawal (1981)
- Tropang Bulilit (1981)
- Rock n' Roll (1981)
- Ito Ba ang Ating Mga Anak (1982)
- Anak – Gabriel (1982)
- No Other Love (1982)
- Diosa – Teddy (1982)
- Indecent Exposure (1983)
- Strangers in Paradise – Tony (1983)
- Mortal Sin (1983)
- Andrea, Paano Ba ang Maging Isang Ina? – Emil (1990)
- Iisa Pa Lamang – Eric (1992)
- Santo-Santito (1996)
- Anak ng Bulkan – Greg Miranda (1997)
- Naglalayag – Dorinda's dead husband (2004)
- Happily Ever After (2005)
- I Will Always Love You – Edward Ledesma (2006)
- I've Fallen For You – Randy Reyes (2007)
- Tutok – Mr. Delgado (2009)
- Kamoteng Kahoy – Congressman (2009)
- Nandito Ako... Nagmamahal sa 'Yo – Orly Suganob (2009)
- Paano Na Kaya – Alvin (2010)
- Rosario – Don Enrique's Friend (2010)
- My Valentine Girls – Aia's father (segment "Soulmates", 2011)
- The Road – Ella's father (2011)
- Shake, Rattle & Roll 13 – Norman (segment "Parola", 2011)
- Amorosa: The Revenge – Lito (2012)
- Biktima (2012)
- Bayang Magiliw (2013)
- Lihis (2013)
- Boy Golden (2013)
- Sa Ngalan ng Ama, Ina, at mga Anak – Derick Pagano (2014)
- Felix Manalo – Juan Natividad (2015)
- Whistleblower (2016)
- This Time – Aldrin's father (2016)
- Isa Pang Bahaghari – Cenen (2020)
- Love Is Color Blind – Ninong Gary (2021)

=== Television ===
Year'	Title	Role
1990	The Maricel Drama Special: "May Mata ang Puso"	
1991	Maalaala Mo Kaya: "Ring"	
1993	Maalaala Mo Kaya: "Obando"	
1993	Noli Me Tangere	Alfonso Linares
2003	Love to Love: "Maid for Each Other"	Ariston
2004–05	Mulawin	Lucio Montenegro
2006	Love Spell	Charm's father
2007	Walang Kapalit	Arnold Santillian
2007	Mga Kuwento ni Lola Basyang: "Prinsesang Kalbo"	Hari
2007	My Only Love	Ricardo
2008	Babangon Ako't Dudurugin Kita	Rosario San Juan
2008	Dyosa	Amang Suga
2008	Lipgloss	Meg's father
2009	Dapat Ka Bang Mahalin?	Don Eddie Sanchez
2009	All My Life	Gilbert
2010	Sine Novela: Ina, Kasusuklaman Ba Kita?	Congressman Arnel Ortega
2011	Maalaala Mo Kaya: "Ice Cream"	Lory's father
2011	Machete	Edgar
2011	Captain Barbell	Manuel Javier
2011	P. S. I Love You	Antonio Tuazon
2012	Legacy	Rowell
2012	Hindi Ka Na Mag-iisa	Bernard Montenegro
2012	Aso ni San Roque	Aldrin Salvador / Diego
2013	Kahit Konting Pagtingin	Philip Ledesma
2013	Love & Lies	Ramon Alcantara
2013	Maalaala Mo Kaya: "Picture Frame"	Eric
2013	Magpakailanman: "Kasalanan Ba ang Umibig?"	Agaton
2013	Genesis	President's Colleague
2014	Carmela	Efren Flores
2014	Rhodora X	Jaime Macalintal
2014	Maalaala Mo Kaya: "Sulat"	Arman
2014	Seasons of Love: BF for Hire, GF for Life	Lulu Villareal
2015	My Faithful Husband	Artemio Fernandez
2016	Usapang Real Love	Fabian Samaniego
2017	Daig Kayo ng Lola Ko: Ang Pulubi at Ang Prinsipe	Mahal na Hari
2017	Dear Uge: Manang and Me	Mr. Lopez
2018	The One That Got Away	Zoe's father
2018	Dear Uge: A Tikoy Love Story	Marco
2018	Hindi Ko Kayang Iwan Ka	Manuel Policarpio
2019	Tadhana: Akin Ang Anak Ko	Fahad
2019	Pamilya Ko	Mr. Palisoc
2020	Love Thy Woman	Eric Chua
2021	Stories From The Heart: Loving Miss Bridgette	Manolo Villareal
2022	A Family Affair	Gov. Elvis "Bingbing" Arevalo
2022	Mano Po Legacy: The Flower Sisters	Leopoldo Chua
2024	Abot-Kamay na Pangarap	Atty. Constantino de Leon
2024–2025	Lilet Matias: Attorney-at-Law	Atty. Constantino de Leon
2025	Maka	Mr. Rodente
2025	FPJ's Batang Quiapo	Henry Angeles
2026	Roja	Sen. Eduardo Maristella
