= A Family Affair (TV series) =

Philippine television drama series

- Title card
- Genre: Melodrama; Romantic thriller Revenge; Family; Soap opera
- Written by: Rona Co; En Villasis; Gena Tenaja
- Directed by: Jerome C. Pobocan; Raymund B. Ocampo; Tak G. Barrios; Richard I. Arellano
- Starring: Ivana Alawi; Gerald Anderson; Sam Milby; Jameson Blake; Jake Ejercito
- Music by: Jessie Lasaten
- Opening theme: "Akin Ka Na Lang (Main version)" by Gigi de Lana
- Composer: Kiko Salazar
- Country of origin: Philippines
- Original language: Filipino
- No. of seasons: 2
- No. of episodes: 95

Production
- Executive producers: Carlo Katigbak; Cory Vidanes; Laurenti Dyogi; Des de Guzman
- Producers: Henry King Quitain; Jay Fernando; Des de Guzman; Sackey Prince Pendatun; Kristine Sioson; Maria Pamela Mendiola Quizon
- Production locations: Masbate; Metro Manila
- Editor: Kathryn Jerry Perez
- Production company: Star Creatives

Original release
- Network: Kapamilya Channel (Note: The series was also broadcast on Jeepney TV, A2Z, TV5. It was also available on-demand via Netflix and iWantTFC.)
- Release: June 27 – November 4, 2022

A Family Affair is a Philippine television drama series broadcast by Kapamilya Channel. Directed by Jerome C. Pobocan, Raymund B. Ocampo, Tak G. Barrios and Richard I. Arellano, it stars Ivana Alawi, Gerald Anderson, Sam Milby, Jameson Blake and Jake Ejercito. It aired on the network's Primetime Bida line up on June 27, 2022. The series concluded on November 4, 2022, with a total of 2 seasons and 95 episodes.

== Summary ==
Cherry Red Magwayen works for the Estrella family while also gaining the inheritance of the late matriarch, Carol. She falls in love and marries Paco, the second son, but she also had a past romance with Dave, the eldest Estrella. However, she'll soon find out that the people she treated like family were also involved in the death of her father. Could this give her a chance to forgive those who wronged her or will she vow revenge to ease her pain and suffering?

== Cast and characters ==
Main cast

- Ivana Alawi as Cherry Red Magwayen-Estrella
  - Mona Alawi as young Cherry Red
- Gerald Anderson as Francisco "Paco" Estrella
  - Louise Abuel as young Paco
- Sam Milby as Dave Estrella
  - Anthony Jennings as young Dave
- Jameson Blake as Andrew "Drew" Estrella
  - Robbie Wachtel as young Drew
- Jake Ejercito as Sebastian "Seb" Estrella
  - Jesse James Ongteco as young Seb

Supporting cast

- Edu Manzano as Frederico "Freddie" Estrella
  - Rocco Nacino as young Freddie
- Ana Abad Santos as Everly "Ebs" Magwayen
- Lito Pimentel as Apolinario "Panyong" Magwayen
- Rans Rifol as Colleen de Jesus
- Aya Fernandez as Rebecca "Becca" Lazaro
- Heaven Peralejo as Victoria "Tori" Simbulan
- Claire Ruiz as Florabelle Ramirez
- Lloyd Samartino as Gov. Elvis Arevalo

Guest cast

- Dawn Zulueta as Carolina "Carol" Estrella
- Jong Cuenco as Mayor Arturo Villanueva
- Jonic Magno as Lando Esquivel
- Sienna Stevens as Malaya M. Estrella

== Production ==
The series began pre-production in 2019 as Kahit Minsan Lang, with Bea Alonzo, Richard Gutierrez, Rafael Rosell and Christian Bables initially part of the cast and while Jameson Blake stays as an original cast along with Ana Abad Santos and Edu Manzano. Principal photography began in early 2020. However, it was temporarily halted due to the lockdown caused by the COVID-19 pandemic. In late June 2020, it was announced that Kahit Minsan Lang was cancelled.

On April 8, 2022, Star Creatives TV has confirmed the official main cast of A Family Affair. The official trailer was released on May 26, 2022.

== Episodes ==
Season	Episodes	Originally released	
Season	Episodes	First released	Last released
1	45	June 27, 2022	August 26, 2022
2	50	August 29, 2022	November 4, 2022

=== Season 1 ===
No. overall	No. in season	Title	TV title	Original release date (Note: iWantTFC streams two episodes first in advance before its television broadcast.)	AGB Nielsen Ratings (NUTAM People)
1	1	"The Homecoming"	"Stripping Now"	June 27, 2022	4.3%
2	2	"Just Like Old Times"	"Rivalry Begins"	June 28, 2022	4.4%
3	3	"The Reconciliation"	"The Plot Thickens"	June 29, 2022	4.2%
4	4	"Us Against the World"	"Bugso ng Damdamin"	June 30, 2022	3.7%
5	5	"Kill This Love"	"The Biggest Secret"	July 1, 2022	4.3%
6	6	"Beginning of the End"	"The Choice"	July 4, 2022	3.7%
7	7	"Fight for Love"	"Addict"	July 5, 2022	3.8 %
8	8	"Moving Forward"	"Moving Forward"	July 6, 2022	3.6 %
9	9	"A New Beginning"	"Flirted Fate"	July 7, 2022	3.8 %
10	10	"Love Amidst Chaos"	"Worth the Wait"	July 8, 2022	4.5 %
11	11	"The Proposal"	"Fall To Win"	July 11, 2022	4.0 %
12	12	"Welcome Home"	"Sorry, Not Sorry"	July 12, 2022	3.2 %
13	13	"Four Brothers and a Wedding"	"AFaiDo"	July 13, 2022	4.3 %
14	14	"Marry the Family"	"Cherry Red Hot Night"	July 14, 2022	3.9 %
15	15	"50/50"	"Life Line"	July 15, 2022	3.4 %
16	16	"Love & Loss"	"Mourning After"	July 18, 2022	4.2 %
17	17	"Favorite Son"	"The Heir"	July 19, 2022	4.3 %
18	18	"Family Feud"	"Family Feud"	July 20, 2022	4.9%
19	19	"Dreams and Nightmare"	"Bad Dreams"	July 21, 2022	4.6 %
20	20	"The President’s a Woman"	"Mind Games"	July 22, 2022	3.9 %
21	21	"Midnight Snacks"	"Twist of Fate"	July 25, 2022	3.9 %
22	22	"The Past"	"Ex Reveal"	July 26, 2022	3.5 %
23	23	"Midnight Snacks"	"Alpha Wars"	July 27, 2022	3.8 %
24	24	"Unknown Images"	"Truth Hurts"	July 28, 2022	4.2 %
25	25	"Surprise"	"New Affair"	July 29, 2022	3.8 %
26	26	"Rodeo King"	"One Strip Closer"	August 1, 2022	3.7 %
27	27	"Storm Signal"	"Rejection"	August 2, 2022	4.0 %
28	28	"After a Storm"	"Wild Night"	August 3, 2022	2.8 %
29	29	"Caught in the Act"	"Evidence"	August 4, 2022	4.2 %
30	30	"Confidential"	"Forda Truth"	August 5, 2022	3.7 %
31	31	"Worry About Me"	"Shady"	August 8, 2022	4.7 %
32	32	"Hidden Gem"	"No Turning Back"	August 9, 2022	3.3 %
33	33	"Confusion"	"Letter and Corpse"	August 10, 2022	3.6 %
34	34	"Fam Day"	"Cover Up"	August 11, 2022	3.3 %
35	35	"For Paco"	"Luck and Lies"	August 12, 2022	2.6 %
36	36	"Lando"	"Tangled"	August 15, 2022	4.1 %
37	37	"Paco for Mayor"	"Run"	August 16, 2022	4.0 %
38	38	"Guilt and Politics"	"Mayor"	August 17, 2022	3.8 %
39	39	"Mayor Paco"	"Blackmail"	August 18, 2022	4.5 %
40	40	"Hit and Run"	"2 Lines"	August 19, 2022	N/A
41	41	"Extra Careful"	"Caged"	August 22, 2022	3.4 %
42	42	"Quick Escape"	"Angsty"	August 23, 2022	3.5 %
43	43	"Blackmail"	"Cancelledt"	August 24, 2022	3.2 %
44	44	"Protect the Family"	"Harassed"	August 25, 2022	3.2 %
45	45	"The Speech"	"Bloody Reveal"	August 26, 2022	2.9 %

=== Season 2 ===
No. overall	No. in season	Title	TV title	Original release date (Note: iWantTFC streams two episodes first in advance before its television broadcast.)	AGB Nielsen Ratings (NUTAM People)
46	1	"Price to Pay"	"The Fallen"	August 29, 2022	3.1%
47	2	"That's What You Get"	"Kidnap"	August 30, 2022	3.4%
48	3	"Caught in the Middle"	"Ransom"	August 31, 2022	3.5%
49	4	"Under Control"	"Truth Teller"	September 1, 2022	3.3%
50	5	"The Great Escape"	"No Escape"	September 2, 2022	3.4%
51	6	"When the Sun Goes Down"	"No One is Safe"	September 5, 2022	3.1%
52	7	"Memory Kill"	"Hard Truth"	September 6, 2022	3.0%
53	8	"Let's Get Married"	"Sealed With a Kiss"	September 7, 2022	3.0%
54	9	"Secret Life"	"Secret Kiss"	September 8, 2022	3.1%
55	10	"Endgame"	"Raining Blood"	September 9, 2022	3.5%
56	11	"The Moment I Knew"	"Gaslighting"	September 12, 2022	3.1%
57	12	"All is Well"	"Lies 4 Life"	September 13, 2022	3.2%
58	13	"Almost Do"	"For Worse"	September 14, 2022	2.7%
59	14	"Mad Woman"	"Escape Plan"	September 15, 2022	2.8%
60	15	"Los in Her"	"Ruined"	September 16, 2022	2.9%
61	16	"Dark Horse"	"True Lies"	September 19, 2022	2.5%
62	17	"This is The"	"Confinement"	September 20, 2022	2.7%
63	18	"Exile"	"Lies After Lies"	September 21, 2022	2.3%
64	19	"Speak Now"	"Lies and Other Drugs"	September 22, 2022	2.7%
65	20	"She Knows"	"End the Curse"	September 23, 2022	2.6%
66	21	"Woman Like"	"Turning Black"	September 26, 2022	2.5%
67	22	"Crocked Sm"	"Wicked Reveal"	September 27, 2022	3.2%
68	23	"Let The Gam"	"Bro Fight"	September 28, 2022	2.8%
69	24	"Solt It Goes"	"Red Turns Black"	September 29, 2022	2.7%
70	25	"llicit Affair"	"Blank Space"	September 30, 2022	3.5%
71	26	"Critical Mist"	"Talk of the Town"	October 3, 2022	2.8%
72	27	"Wanna Be"	"Seductively Wrong"	October 4, 2022	2.7%
73	28	"The Audacity"	"Forbidden Kiss"	October 5, 2022	2.7%
74	29	"One Time T"	"Lying Hearts"	October 6, 2022	3.0%
75	30	"cry your He"	"The Raid"	October 7, 2022	3.0%
76	31	"Take You A"	"Checkmate"	October 10, 2022	3.1%
77	32	"The Worman"	"Payback"	October 11, 2022	2.4%
78	33	"The Body is"	"Black Revenge"	October 12, 2022	2.3%
79	34	"Repent and"	"It's a Trap"	October 13, 2022	2.3%
80	35	"Repent and Pay"	"Torment"	October 14, 2022	3.0%
81	36	"Fade Into You"	"Hanging Pain"	October 17, 2022	2.6%
82	37	"Not My Fault"	"Sorry, Too Late"	October 18, 2022	2.3%
83	38	"Walk Away"	"Untouchable"	October 19, 2022	2.4%
84	39	"Burried Mys"	"Escape Offer"	October 20, 2022	2.5%
85	40	"Eyes Open"	"Crash and Burn"	October 21, 2022	N/A
86	41	"Take a Blow"	"Crazed and Dazed"	October 24, 2022	N/A
87	42	"Back to You"	"Cliffhanger"	October 25, 2022	N/A
88	43	"In the Blood"	"Expectant"	October 26, 2022	2.2%
89	44	"Last Train Home"	"The Call"	October 27, 2022	N/A
90	45	"You're Gonna Live Forever"	"Left Behind"	October 28, 2022	2.8%
91	46	"A Face to Call Home"	"Leap of Blood"	October 31, 2022	2.6%
92	47	"The Age of Worry"	"Lovingly Father"	November 1, 2022	2.5%
93	48	"Carry Me Away"	"Unending Love"	November 2, 2022	2.8%
94	49	"The Heart of Life"	"Apologies"	November 3, 2022	2.3%
95	50	"A Family Affair"	"The End"	November 4, 2022	3.7%

== Reception ==
The official trailer of A Family Affair garnered 1.7 million views in less than six hours on Facebook. According to Manila Bulletin, the trailer gained more than 7 million views, two weeks since it was premiered. A Family Affair is also consistently among the top shows on the streaming service iWantTFC, becoming the third most watched show on the platform.

Upon its availability on the streaming service Netflix, the series immediately became a hit and became the most watched TV show on the platform.

== Accolades ==
Year	Work	Award-giving body	Category	Recipient	Result	Source
2022	A Family Affair	Gawad Pilipino Icon Awards	Best Actress	Ivana Alawi	Won	
