= Mona Alawi =

Filipino actress and model (born 2004)

- Born: Mona Marbella Al-Alawi; August 19, 2004 (age 21); Manila, Philippines
- Other name: Mona Louise Rey
- Education: St. Monique College of Manila
- Agent: Sparkle (2011–2021)
- Relatives: Ivana Alawi (sister)

YouTube information
- Years active: 2011–present
- Subscribers: 2.21 million
- Views: 16.8 million
- Last updated: July 6, 2023

Mona Marbella Al-Alawi (Tagalog: [ˈmɔnɐ ɐˈlaʊɪ]; born August 19, 2004), then-credited as Mona Louise Rey, is a Filipino actress and model. She is known for appearing in the television series Munting Heredera (2011–2012), Aso ni San Roque (2012–2013), Luna Blanca (2012), Bukod Kang Pinagpala (2013), and My BFF (2014), among others.

== Career ==
Alawi was born in Manila, Philippines. She started her career in show business playing the title role of Jennifer Montereal in the hit GMA Network family drama Munting Heredera that aired for more than a year. She then portrayed the role of Fatima Salvador, a blind girl with a golden heart who is an offspring of a mortal and a manananggal, in the same network's fantaserye Aso ni San Roque.

== Personal life ==
Mona Alawi is the youngest of four siblings born to a Filipino mother, Fatima Marbella, and a Moroccan father, Samier Al-Alawi. One of her older sisters, Ivana Alawi, is an actress and social media influencer with millions of followers. Alawi's mother separated from her father when she was pregnant with her and went to Manila in 2004. Alawi's mother left her three older children with their father; Alawi would not be reunited with her in Manila until 2006. Alawi and her family are Catholic.

Alawi has Type 1 diabetes, a disease she was diagnosed with in 2011, the year she started her career in show business. As a result, she has to maintain a strict daily regimen of insulin self-injections and avoiding foods and drinks rich in sugar and carbohydrates.

== Filmography ==
=== Film ===
Year	Title	Role	Notes
2014	Basement	Anna	
2014	Kubot: The Aswang Chronicles 2	Young Aswang	
2015	Child Haus		

=== Television ===
Year	Title	Role	Notes
2011–2012	Munting Heredera	Jennifer Montereal	
2011	Spooky Nights	Ena	Spooky Nights Presents: Kalaro
2012	Spooky Valentine	Paula	Spooky Valentines Presents: Manibela
2012	Luna Blanca	Blanca Sandoval	Book 1
2012–2013	Aso ni San Roque	Fatima Salvador / Racquel	
2013	Bukod Kang Pinagpala	Lara Alcuar / Cindy Alcuar	
2013	Magpakailanman	Princess Pura (young)	Episode: Prinsesa ng Mga Pipi
2013	Magkano Ba ang Pag-ibig?	Margot (young)	
2013	Villa Quintana	Lyn (young)	
2014	Carmela: Ang Pinakamagandang Babae sa Mundong Ibabaw	Carmela (young)	
2014	My BFF	Rachel Garcia	
2015–2016	Buena Familia	Faye A. Buena	
2016	Ismol Family	Ghost	
2016	Imbestigador	Mary Ann	
2016–2017	Hahamakin ang Lahat	Gigi Labsat	
2017	Dear Uge	Ella	Episode: Segunda Mommy
2018	Hindi Ko Kayang Iwan Ka	Ava Imperial (young)	
2018	Daig Kayo ng Lola Ko	Dopey	Snow White and the Seven Dwarfs
2018	Daig Kayo ng Lola Ko	Christine	Episode: Pepe and the Werpa Kids
2018	Daig Kayo ng Lola Ko	Mary	Episode: Nonoy, ang Santang Pinoy
2018	Tadhana	Roan	Episode: Ang Dalawang Ina
2022	A Family Affair	Young Cherry	
2024	FPJ's Batang Quiapo	Young Bubbles	

== Awards and nominations ==
Year	Award giving body	Category	Result	Source
2012	26th PMPC Star Awards for Television	Best Child Performer	Nominated	
