= Ivana Alawi =

Filipino actress, YouTuber, model (born 1996)

- Alawi in 2026
- Born: Mariam Sayed Sameer Marbella Al-Alawi; December 25, 1996 (age 29); Philippines
- Other names: Mariel Rey; Mariam Al-Alawi
- Citizenship: Philippines; Morocco
- Occupations: Actress; social media influencer
- Years active: 2011–present
- Agents: GMA Artist Center (2015–17); Star Magic (2018–present)
- Relatives: Mona Alawi (sister)

YouTube information
- Years active: 2018–present
- Genre: Vlogging
- Subscribers: 20.4 million
- Views: 1.9 billion
- Last updated: Apr 24, 2026

Mariam "Ivana" Sayed Sameer Marbella Al-Alawi (born December 25, 1996) is a Filipino actress, YouTuber and social media personality.

Alawi is the most-subscribed Filipino personality on YouTube, having been honored by Google as the "Top YouTube Content Creator" in the Philippines for two consecutive years. In 2019, she won a PMPC Star Award for Best New Female TV Personality.

== Career ==
=== Film and television ===
Alawi appeared on the sixth season of GMA-7's competition series StarStruck that aired in 2015, where she placed among the top 22 contestants. She was later signed by GMA Artist Center.

In 2018, Alawi appeared as Rina on ABS-CBN's Precious Hearts Romances Presents: Araw Gabi. A year later she appeared as Amor in FPJ's Ang Probinsyano, made her film debut in the film Open, was later cast in the Metro Manila Film Festival entry 3pol Trobol: Huli Ka Balbon!, and appeared as Lolita in Sino ang Maysala?: Mea Culpa, for which she was awarded Best New Female Personality at the 33rd PMPC Star Awards for Television.

=== YouTube ===
Alawi launched a self-titled YouTube channel in 2019. Her channel is currently one of the most growing and subscribed in YouTube Philippines.

== Personal life ==
Alawi was raised in Bahrain by a Filipino mother and a Moroccan father. The third of four children, she eventually inherited all of her father's money after his death in 2018. Her youngest sibling is actress and model Mona Alawi.

On February 12, 2024, Albee Benitez publicly apologized to Alawi over speculations that they were having an affair, after Ogie Diaz revealed on YouTube that they were spotted at Tokyo airport. "I went there on a business trip as stated in my official travel order. I apologize to Ms. Alawi, there is no truth to any and all the rumors spreading and I am setting the record straight to avoid further hurt and damage to them," Benitez said. In May 2025, Benitez's wife, Dominique Lopez, filed a criminal complaint for Violence Against Women and Children (VAWC) against him, accusing him of "severe mental and emotional distress" through his extramarital affairs, including an alleged affair with Alawi.

In October 2024, Alawi was hospitalized due to polyendocrine metabolic ovarian syndrome (PMOS).

== Filmography ==
=== Film ===
| Year | Title | Role | Notes | Ref. |
|---|---|---|---|---|
| 2019 | Open | Monique | | |
| 2019 | 3pol Trobol: Huli Ka Balbon! | Stacey Jimenez | Guest | |
| 2020 | Sitsit | Joyce | Segment: "Aswang" | |
| 2022 | Partners in Crime | Barbara Nicole Rose Albano | Lead role | |
| 2025 | Shake, Rattle & Roll: Evil Origins | Edris | Segment: "2050" | |

=== Television ===
| Year | Title | Role | Notes | Ref. |
|---|---|---|---|---|
| 2011 | Tween Hearts | Alexa | Credited as "Mariel Rey" | |
| 2015 | StarStruck (season 6) | Herself | Contestant; credited as "Mariam Al-Alawi" | |
| 2016 | Magpakailanman | Young Lourdes | Episode: "Ang Lolo kong Prosti"; credited as "Mariam Al-Alawi" | |
| 2016 | Magpakailanman | KC | Episode: "The Rape Video Scandal"; credited as "Mariam Al-Alawi" | |
| 2016 | Juan Happy Love Story | Ava | Cameo role | |
| 2016 | Once Again | Joan | Recurring role | |
| 2018 | Araw Gabi | Rina | Supporting role | |
| 2018–19 | FPJ's Ang Probinsyano | Madonna | Guest role | |
| 2019 | Sino ang Maysala?: Mea Culpa | Lolita Del Rio | Main role | |
| 2022 | A Family Affair | Cherry Red Magwayen-Estrella | Main role | |
| 2022–present | ASAP XP | Herself | Performer | |
| 2023–24 | FPJ's Batang Quiapo | Samantha Montenegro-Macaraig / Samantha "Bubbles" Fortun-Zaballa | Supporting role | |
| 2025 | Edens Zero | Rebecca Bluegarden (voice) | Main role | |
| 2025 | Pinoy Big Brother: Celebrity Collab Edition | Herself | Contestant / Houseguest | |
| 2025 | It's Showtime | Herself | Performer | |
| 2025 | Rainbow Rumble | Herself | Contestant | |
| 2026 | Love Is Never Gone | Yana Kassir / Gem Verona | Main role | |

=== Music videos ===
| Year | Title | Artist(s) | Role | Ref. |
|---|---|---|---|---|
| 2020 | "Sana All" | Ivana Alawi | Herself | |
| 2021 | "Paraluman" | Adie | Herself | |
| 2021 | "Inferno" | Sub Urban and Bella Poarch | Herself | |

== Awards and nominations ==
| Year | Work | Award | Category | Result | Ref. |
|---|---|---|---|---|---|
| 2019 | Sino ang Maysala?: Mea Culpa | PMPC Star Awards for Television | Best New Female Personality | Won | |
| 2022 | A Family Affair | Gawad Pilipino Icon Awards | Best Actress | Won | |
| 2022 | Partners in Crime | 48th Gabi Ng Parangal: Metro Manila Film Festival | Best Actress | Nominated | |
