= PMPC Star Award for Best New TV Personality =

The PMPC Star Awards for Television Best New TV Personalities are presented to the best new performers in a different television programs except 1988 which is "Most Promising TV Personality" (a Special award).

== Winners ==
=== Single Category ===
==== 1980s ====
Year	Actor	Program	Network
1987 (1st)	Princess Punzalan	Lovingly Yours, Helen	GMA
1988 (2nd)	Alice Dixson	Okay Ka, Fairy Ko!	IBC
1988 (2nd)	Jenjon Otico	Dina	ABS-CBN
1988 (2nd)	Melissa Perez Rubio	Dina	ABS-CBN
1988 (2nd)	Whitney Tyson	Goin' Bananas	ABS-CBN
1989 (3rd)	Aiko Melendez	Regal Drama Hour Presents: Aiko	IBC

==== 1990s ====
Year	Actor	Program	Network
1990 (4th)	Margarita Fuentes	Anna Luna	ABS-CBN
1991 (5th)	Christine Jacob	Eat Bulaga!	ABS-CBN
1992 (6th)	Rustom Padilla	Lunch Date	GMA
1993 (7th)	Claudine Barretto	Ang TV	ABS-CBN
1994 (8th)	Mikee Cojuangco	Spotlight	GMA
1995 (9th)	Dayanara Torres	ASAP	ABS-CBN
1996 (10th)	Shaina Magdayao	Lyra	GMA
1997 (11th)	Jake Roxas	Ikaw na Sana	GMA
1998 (12th)	Jericho Rosales	Maalaala Mo Kaya: Pampang	ABS-CBN

Notes:

- Dayanara Torres is the first foreign artist to win this award in the Philippines since 1995.

=== Male New TV Personalities ===
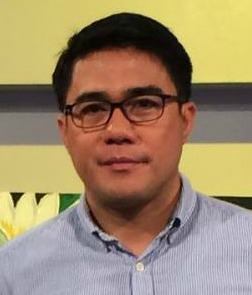
Aljo Bendijo as Best Male New TV Personality (2001)

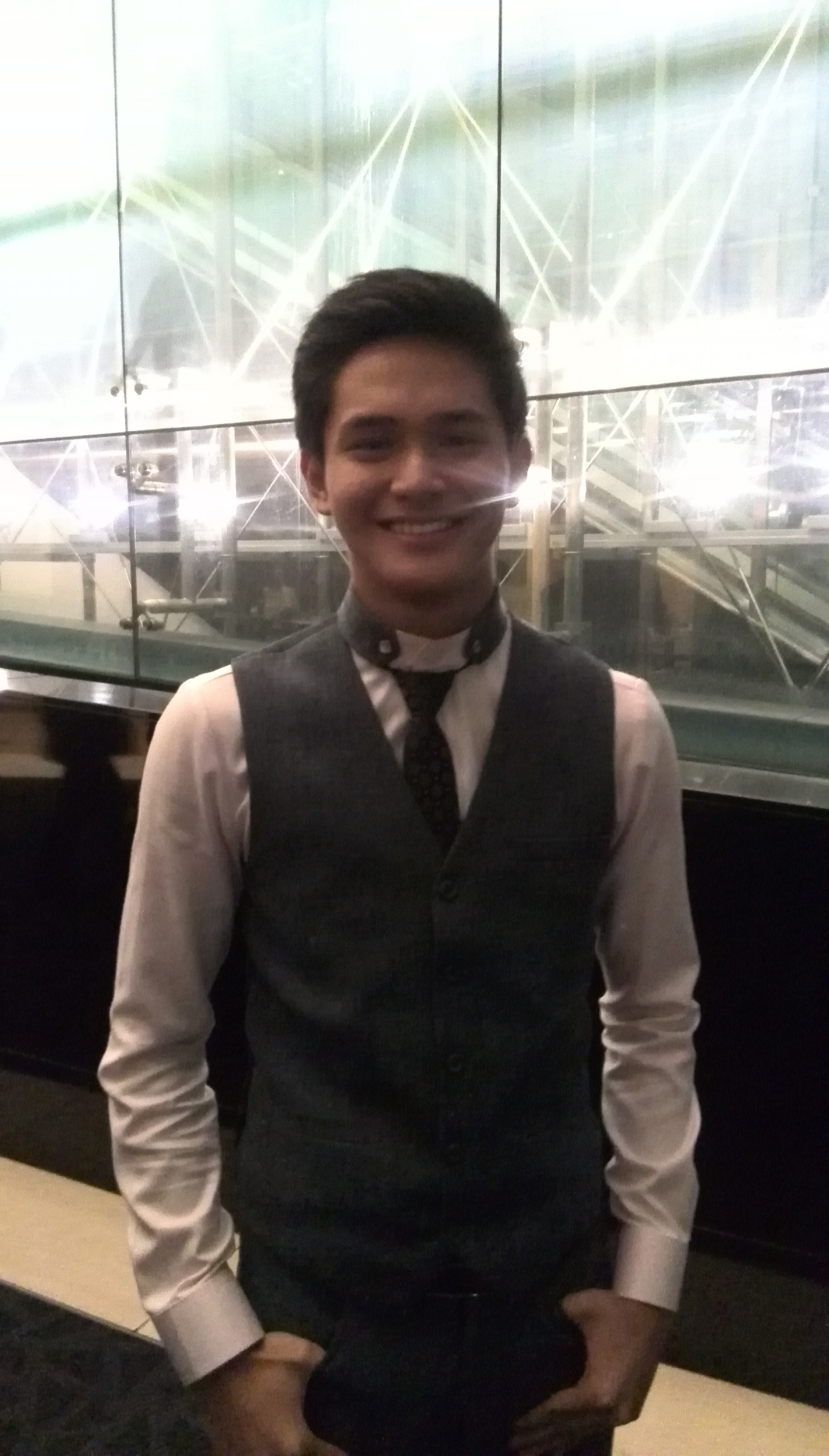
Ruru Madrid won the Best New TV Personality award for 2013

1999: Leandro Muñoz (Saan Ka Man Naroroon / ABS-CBN 2)

2000: James Blanco (Click / GMA 7)

2001: Aljo Bendijo (TV Patrol / ABS-CBN 2)

2002: Paolo Ballesteros (Daddy Di Do Du / GMA 7)

2003: Luis Manzano (ASAP Mania / ABS-CBN 2)

2004: Rainier Castillo (Click / GMA 7) & Erik Santos (ASAP Mania / ABS-CBN 2) [tied]

2005: Joross Gamboa (Nginiiig! / ABS-CBN 2)

2006: Sam Milby (ASAP '06 / ABS-CBN 2)

2007: Gerald Anderson (Sana Maulit Muli / ABS-CBN 2) & Ronnie Liang (ASAP '07 / ABS-CBN 2) [tied]

2008: Robi Domingo (ASAP ‘08 / ABS-CBN 2)

2009: JR de Guzman [later as Benjamin de Guzman] (Midnight DJ / TV5) & Zaijian Jaranilla (May Bukas Pa / ABS-CBN 2) [tied]

2010: Johan Santos (Precious Hearts Romances Presents: Love Me Again / ABS-CBN 2)

2011: Derick Monasterio & Teejay Marquez (Reel Love Presents: Tween Hearts / GMA 7) [tied]

2012: Arjo Atayde (Maalaala Mo Kaya: Bangka / ABS-CBN 2)

2013: Ruru Madrid (Maynila: Faith in Love; GMA-7)

2014: Manolo Pedrosa (Maalaala Mo Kaya: Selfie / ABS-CBN 2)

2015: Alonzo Muhlach (Inday Bote / ABS-CBN 2)

2016: Jake Ejercito (God Gave Me You / GMA 7) & Onyok Pineda (Ang Probinsyano / ABS-CBN 2) [tied]

2017: Tony Labrusca (La Luna Sangre / ABS-CBN 2)

2018: Tenten "Kendoll" Mendoza (Eat Bulaga! / GMA 7)

2019: Aljon Mendoza (Maalaala Mo Kaya: Medal of Valor / ABS-CBN 2) & Klinton Starto (Bee Happy, Go Lucky / Net 25) [tied]

2020: Joaquin Domagoso (All-Out Sundays / GMA 7)

2021: Renshi de Guzman (Huwag Kang Mangamba / A2Z 11, TV5) & L.A. Santos (Ang Sa’yo Ay Akin / A2Z 11, TV5) [tied]

2023: John Clifford (Pepito Manaloto / GMA 7)

2024: Andres Muhlach (Da Pers Family / TV5)

=== Female New TV Personalities ===
1999: Tracy Vergel (Sa Sandaling Kailangan Mo Ako / ABS-CBN 2)

2000: Carla Guevara (Star Drama Mini-Series: Bum / ABS-CBN 2)

2001: Yam Ledesma (Lunch Break / IBC 13) & Heart Evangelista (G-Mik / ABS-CBN 2) [tied]

2002: Nancy Castiglione (Sana Ay Ikaw Na Nga / GMA 7)

2003: Valerie Concepcion (Click / GMA 7)

2004: Bettina Carlos (Kakabakaba Adventures / GMA 7) & Pauleen Luna (Marina / ABS-CBN 2) [tied]

2005: Melissa Ricks (SCQ Reload: OK Ako / ABS-CBN 2)

2006: Marian Rivera (Kung Aagawin Mo Man Ang Lahat / GMA 7)

2007: Kim Chiu (Sana Maulit Muli / ABS-CBN 2) & Lovi Poe (Bakekang / GMA 7) [tied]

2008: Patricia Gayod (Maalaala Mo Kaya: Dagat / ABS-CBN 2) & Kylie Padilla (Joaquin Bordado / GMA 7) [tied]

2009: Maricar Reyes (Precious Hearts Romance Presents Presents: Bud Brothers / ABS-CBN 2)

2010: Carla Abellana (Rosalinda / GMA 7)

2011: Jillian Ward (Trudis Liit / GMA 7)

2012: Divine Lee (Extreme Makeover Home Edition / TV5)

2013: Janella Salvador (Be Careful with My Heart; ABS-CBN 2)

2014: Lyca Gairanod (Maalaala Mo Kaya: Red Envelope / ABS-CBN 2)

2015: Jana Agoncillo (Dream Dad / ABS-CBN 2)

2016: Ria Atayde (Maalaala Mo Kaya: Puno ng Mangga / ABS-CBN 2)

2017: Mikee Quintos (Encantadia / GMA 7)

2018: Heaven Peralejo (Wansapanataym Presents: Jasmin's Flower Power / ABS-CBN 2)

2019: Ivana Alawi (Sino ang Maysala?: Mea Culpa / ABS-CBN 2)

2020: Kaori Oinuma (Maalaala Mo Kaya: Mata / ABS-CBN 2)

2021: Catriona Gray (Sunday Noontime Live / TV5)

2023: Gela Atayde (Senior High / A2Z 11, TV5)

2024: Fyang Smith (Pinoy Big Brother: Gen 11 Big 4 Ever / A2Z 11, TV5)
