= Luna Blanca =

2012 Philippine television drama series

- Title card
- Genre: Fantasy drama
- Created by: R.J. Nuevas; Dode Cruz
- Developed by: Kit Villanueva-Langit
- Written by: Ma. Cristina Velasco; Luningning Ribay; Marlon Miguel
- Directed by: Dominic Zapata
- Creative director: Jun Lana
- Starring: Jillian Ward; Mona Louise Rey; Bea Binene; Barbie Forteza; Bianca King; Heart Evangelista
- Theme music composer: Willy Cruz and Baby Gil
- Opening theme: "Sana'y Maghintay ang Walang Hanggan" by Rachelle Ann Go
- Country of origin: Philippines
- Original language: Tagalog
- No. of episodes: 115

Production
- Executive producer: Mona Coles Mayuga
- Production locations: Manila, Philippines; Malabon, Philippines; Quezon City, Philippines; Cavite, Philippines; Tagaytay, Philippines
- Cinematography: Roman Theodossis
- Camera setup: Multiple-camera setup
- Running time: 20–38 minutes
- Production company: GMA Entertainment TV

Original release
- Network: GMA Network
- Release: May 21 – October 26, 2012

Related
- Luna Mystika

Luna Blanca is a 2012 Philippine television drama fantasy series broadcast by GMA Network. The series served as a sequel to the 2008 Philippine television series Luna Mystika. Directed by Dominic Zapata, it stars Jillian Ward, Mona Louise Rey, Bea Binene, Barbie Forteza, Bianca King and Heart Evangelista all in the title roles. It premiered on May 21, 2012 on the network's Telebabad line up. The series concluded on October 26, 2012, with a total of 115 episodes.

The series is streaming online on YouTube.

== Cast and characters ==
Cast

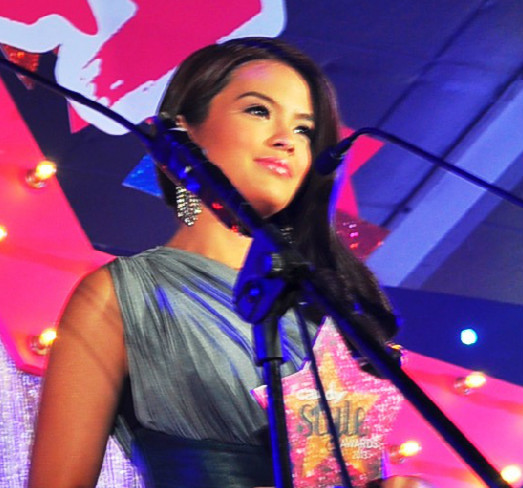
Bea Binene

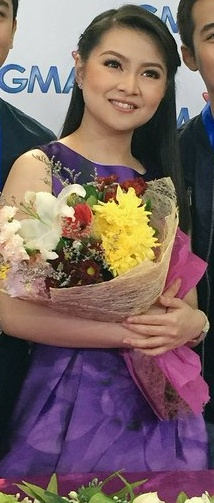
Barbie Forteza

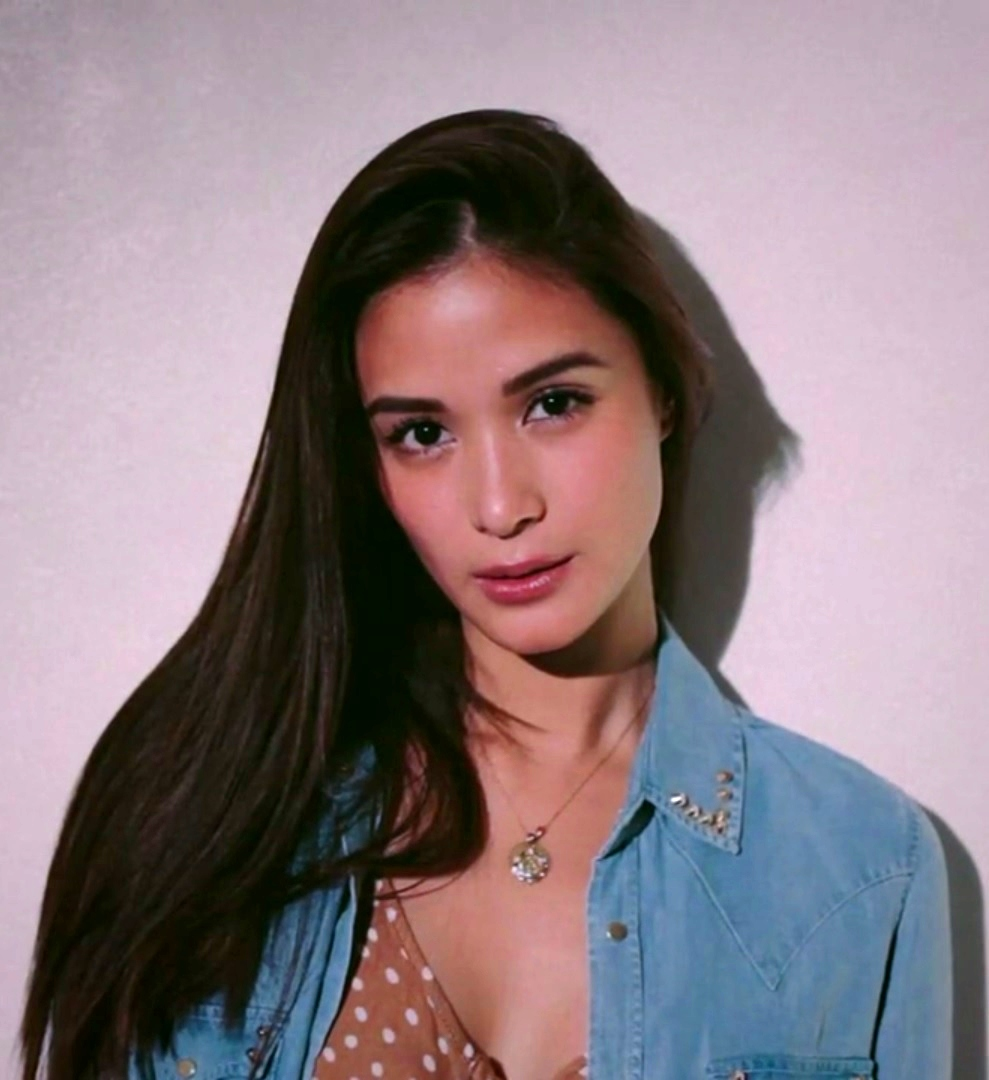
Heart Evangelista

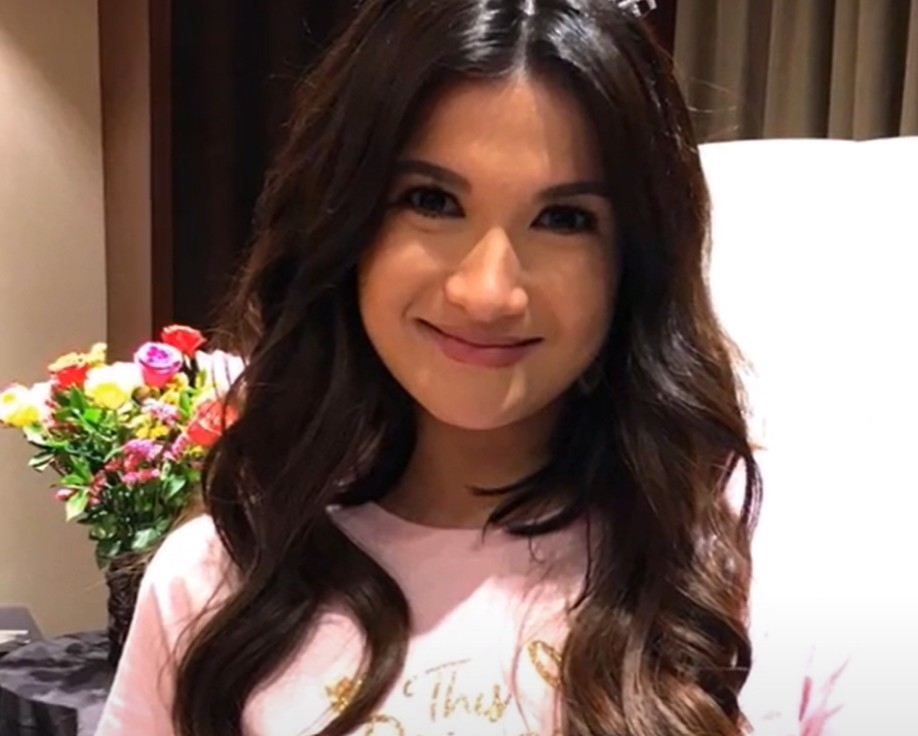
Camille Prats

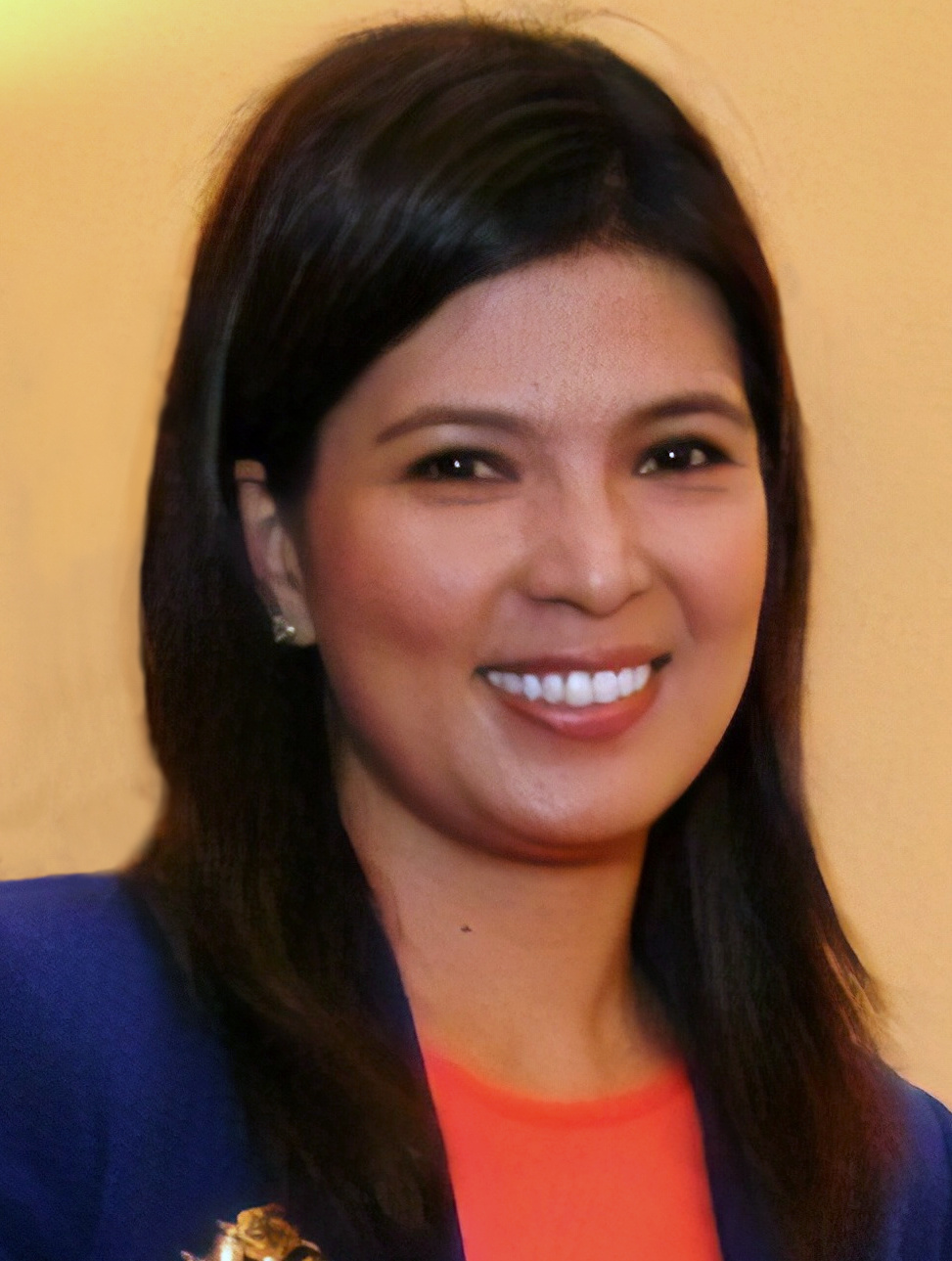
Lani Mercado

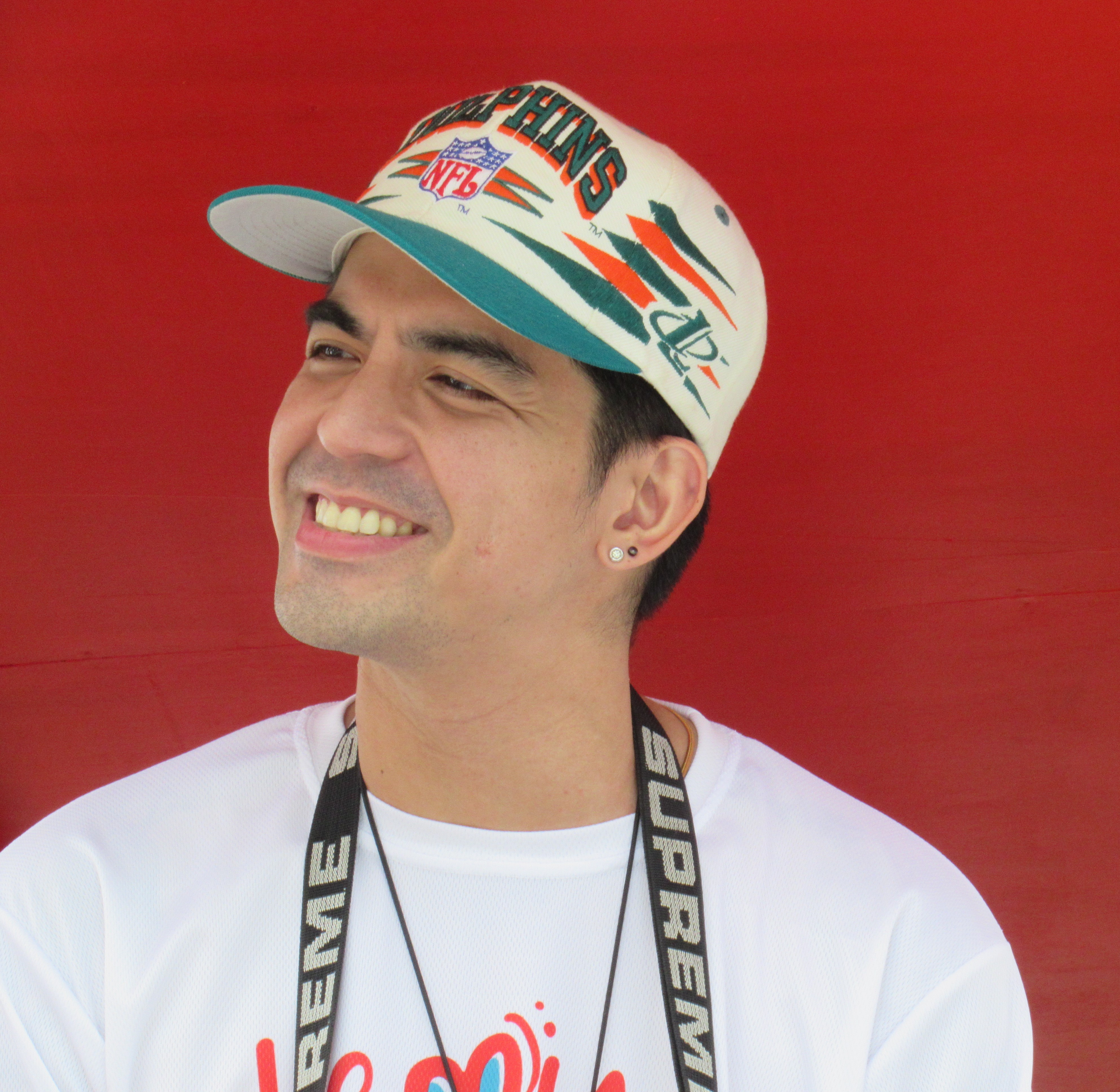
Mark Herras

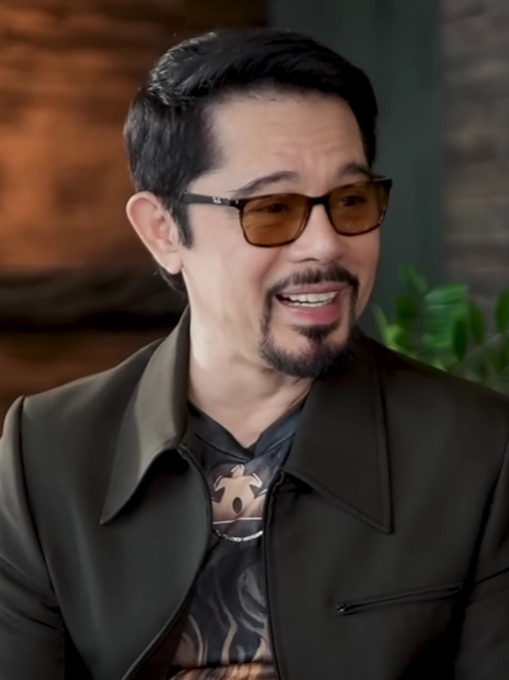
Christopher de Leon

Lead cast

- Jillian Ward as younger Luna Sandoval
- Mona Louise Rey as younger Blanca Sandoval
- Bea Binene as teenage Luna
- Barbie Forteza as teenage Blanca
- Bianca King as older Luna / Cara Amor Montecines
- Heart Evangelista as older Blanca

Supporting cast

- Raymart Santiago as younger Luis Buenaluz
- Camille Prats as younger Rowena Sandoval
- Chynna Ortaleza as younger Divine Alvarez
- Dante Rivero as Igme Sagrado
- Marissa Delgado as Consuelo Buenaluz
- Karen delos Reyes as Girlie
- Mercedes Cabral as Marietta Montecines
- Buboy Villar as Samuel "Samboy" De Jesus
- Arkin Magalona as Toti
- Gina Alajar as Linda De Jesus
- Allan Paule as Crispin De Jesus
- Kristoffer Martin as younger Joaquin "Aki" Alvarez
- Derrick Monasterio as older Kiko De Jesus
- Ryza Cenon as Ashley Alvarez
- Yassi Pressman as Kate
- Christopher de Leon as older Luis
- Lani Mercado as older Rowena
- Carmi Martin as older Divine
- Carlos Morales as Devolas / Diego Montecines
- Mark Herras as older Aki

Guest cast

- Marco Alcaraz as Alex
- Dexter Doria as Eloisa
- Jan Marini Alano as Belen
- Nicky Castro as younger Kiko
- Jade Lopez as Roma
- Luis Alandy as Teddy
- Bettina Carlos as Cherry

== Development ==
Associate producer, Jonathan Pachica, said that Luna Blanca is a sequel to Luna Mystika, GMA Network's 2008 drama series, which also starred Heart Evangelista. It premiered on November 17, 2008 and concluded on March 6, 2009.

The connection between these two series was presented during Luna Blanca's premiere episode on May 21, 2012, where selected clips from Luna Mystika was shown while Rowena, the character played by Camille Prats, narrating a story to a bunch of children about the Sagrado family and the engkanto-blooded twins Luna and Celestina and how the latter transforms into a monster every time the full moon shines brightly at night who intends to scare the children. Lolo Igme, Rowena's grandfather portrayed by Dante Rivero (who was also part of the prequel as Joaquin Sagrado), came and asked Rowena not to make fun of her origin again. In the story, Rowena is revealed to be the last descendant of Luna Mystika; one thing she does not believe because she thinks that the engkanto and other supernatural creatures are just myth or merely imagination. Her disbelief persists until she encounters a black, smoke-like creature known as the engkanto in the forest who raped her. Rowena's nightmares are far from over when she gives birth to an unusual twin, one with fair skin (Blanca) and the other one with very dark complexions (Luna). Unknown to Rowena, Luna also has a mystical twin shadow aside from Blanca. the same eerie creature first unveiled in Luna Mystika.

On May 2, 2012 at the story conference of the series, Cheryl Ching-Sy, the Senior Program Manager, explained that the series is a multi-generational drama. It ran for three chapters with a different line up of actors starring in each generation's story. The production targeted a 25-week run for the series.

Director Dominic Zapata was hired to direct the series.

=== Themes ===
Luna Blanca consists of three prominent themes: love, family and mysticism. In the first chapter of the series, the story focused more on family and mysticism. The first three episodes focuses on the ancestry of Rowena, her connection to Luna and Celestina, the mystery behind the sudden loss of her parents [which her grandfather blames on the engkantos], herself being a victim of sexual assault of a supernatural being [black engkanto], and the appearance of Luna's mystical shadow. Luna's mysterious persona is not revealed yet until the end of the first chapter. However, the story eventually develops into realistic drama that tells the sufferings of Rowena's family on raising the twins alone, alongside Luna's quest in conquering her mother's love, care, and acceptance despite the discrimination she faces. The unexpected, tragic death of Lolo Igme and the sisters' huge love for each other despite physical differences and ultimately, separation. Camille Prats, who is part of the series' main cast was quoted:

"The message of Luna Blanca is not all about social discrimination on the basis of skin color. It is rather the inner conflict, social stigma and the self-inflicted torment that a woman experienced after being raped by a supernatural being or an Engkanto. It was an Engkanto symbolic rape because the series is set within the paradigms of its preceding story, Luna Mystika."

—

"The series will eventually develop into a realistic high drama with a social message overriding the mysticism of its prequel", she added.

On the second and third chapter, romance and mysticism became the main core of the story. The "love" aspect takes place when the two protagonists enters their adolescence and young adult years, respectively. The characters Joaquin who was played by Kristofer Martin and Aki by Mark Herras in the second and third books serves as love interests (as well as the "intricator") of Luna and Blanca. Mystic themes take place when Luna's persona unveils itself alongside the return of her twin shadow Ani, the human form of Devolas with Diego entering the picture, and the transformation of Luna's unnatural appearance to that of a typical morena, as she wished.

=== Casting ===
At the series' press conference held on May 15, 2012, the producer presented six actresses to portray and breathe life to the characters of Luna and Blanca.

Chosen to play the lead roles in the first chapter are child stars Jillian Ward as Luna, and Mona Louise Rey as Blanca. Prior to casting, the two child actresses were popular in their previous hit drama series Trudis Liit and Munting Heredera respectively. Marissa Delgado, a veteran villainess who plays the children's grandmother in the show, compares Ward and Rey; saying that Ward reminds her of Niño Muhlach (a well-known mid-70's child star) for being witty, jolly, and restless; Rey on the other hand is described as "sweet, ladylike, and reserved type who flashes a wholesome personality on and off camera.

Portraying the teen characters in the second chapter are Barbie Forteza as Blanca and Bea Binene as Luna. Forteza said in one of her interviews that she finds her role very challenging, saying: "It is easier to play the Tweety Pie roles, but not when the role demands control and let your partner in a scene cower in fear and tears."

In the first and second chapter, Camille Prats, Raymart Santiago and Chynna Ortaleza were cast as Rowena, Luis and Divine, respectively, the three prominent characters in the series.

Although reluctant to play the role for the second chapter, fearing that she might not fit nor be credible enough to be a mother of teenagers, Prats [who's only in her late 20s] accepted the role after producers explained how significant her role was.

In the last installment of the series, Bianca King and Heart Evangelista played as the adult Luna and Blanca respectively.

Mark Herras taken over the role of Joaquin, the love interest of Blanca (Evangelista) and Luna (King), while, veteran actors Lani Mercado, Christopher de Leon and Carmi Martin taking over the aged characters of Rowena, Luis and Divine, respectively.

== Production ==
Principal photography commenced on May 4, 2012. Filming concluded in October 2012.

== Reception ==
=== Ratings ===
According to AGB Nielsen Philippines' Mega Manila household television ratings, the pilot episode of Luna Blanca earned a 26.3% rating. The final episode scored a 24% rating.

=== Critical response ===
Alfredo B. Severino of Negros Daily Bulletin said that the show is an "Epic literature in many ways. It was not written in poetic style but the extended narrative, its press release called multi-generational story, and the development of an old folk tale qualifies it to be epic-based."

== Accolades ==
Accolades received by Luna Blanca
Year	Award	Category	Recipient	Result	Ref.
2012	26th PMPC Star Awards for Television	Best Child Performer	Jillian Ward	Nominated	
