= Jake Ejercito =

Filipino actor (born 1990)

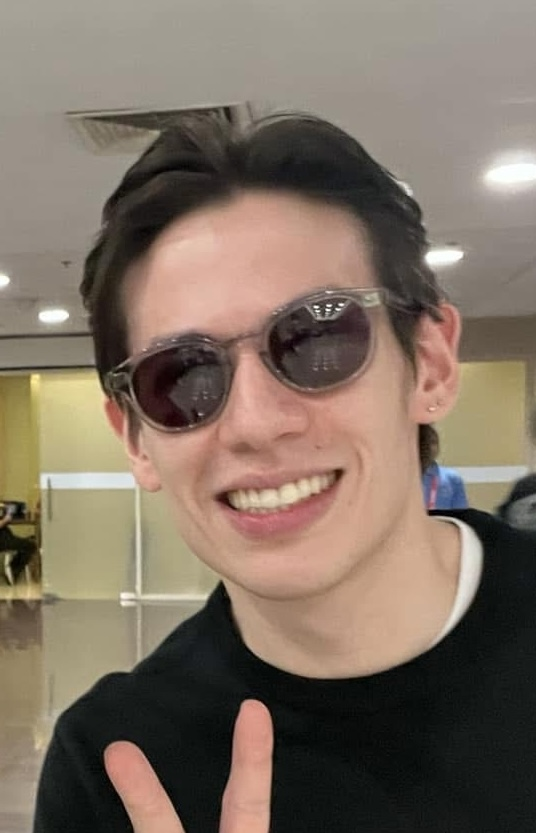
- Ejercito in 2023
- Born: Juan Emilio Enriquez Ejercito; March 27, 1990 (age 36); Metro Manila, Philippines
- Education: Queen Mary University of London; Northumbria University
- Occupations: Actor; model
- Years active: 2016–present
- Agent: Star Magic (2021–present)
- Height: 1.75 m (5 ft 9 in)
- Partner: Andi Eigenmann (2011–2014)
- Father: Joseph Estrada
- Family: Ejercito

Juan Emilio "Jake" Enriquez Ejercito (Tagalog pronunciation: [ʔɛˌhɛːɾ.sɪˈto]; born March 27, 1990) is a Filipino actor. He is the son of former actor and Philippine President Joseph Estrada and a half-brother to Senators Jinggoy Estrada and JV Ejercito.

== Education ==
Ejercito attended Xavier School in San Juan from grade school to high school. He studied politics at the Queen Mary University of London.

In 2018, Ejercito earned his master's degree in marketing from the Singapore campus of UK-based Northumbria University.

== Acting career ==
Ejercito made guest appearances as Jake, a classmate to Maine Mendoza's character Yaya Dub, in Eat Bulaga!'s "Kalyeserye" segment in 2016. In the same year, he later appeared in the said variety show's Lenten specials and was awarded Best New Male TV Personality in the 30th PMPC Star Awards for Television for his appearance in the episode "God Gave Me You".

In 2020, he hosted Sunday Noontime Live! and made his film debut in Coming Home.

From September 2021 to January 2022, he portrayed Cedric Banes on the television series Marry Me, Marry You.

== Personal life ==
Ejercito is one of three children of Joseph Estrada and Laarni Enriquez. Through his father, he has multiple half-siblings.

Ejercito fathers Ellie Eigenmann (born November 2011), from a relationship with actress Andi Eigenmann. He broke up with Eigenmann in 2014, but he continues to co-parent Ellie with her.

== Acting credits ==
=== Film ===
Key
†	Denotes films that have not yet been released

Jake Ejercito's film credits with year of release, film titles and roles
Year	Title	Role	Ref.
2020	Coming Home	Enji Librada	
2023	A Very Good Girl	Charles	
2024	GG: Good Game	Coach of Northstarz	

=== Television ===
†	Denotes shows that have not yet been aired

Jake Ejercito's television credits with year of release, title(s) and role
Year	Title	Role	Ref.
2016	Eat Bulaga: Kalyeserye	Yaya Dub's classmate	
2016	Eat Bulaga Lenten Special: God Gave Me You	Matthew	
2017	Eat Bulaga Lenten Special: Mansyon	Jeko Neruda	
2018	Eat Bulaga Lenten Special: Pamilya	Lester	
2020–2021	Sunday Noontime Live!	Himself / Host / Performer	
2021	ASAP	Himself / Performer	
2021–2022	Marry Me, Marry You	Cedric Banes	
2022	The Broken Marriage Vow	Gabby Gomez	
2022	A Family Affair	Seb Estrella	
2023	Fit Check	Chris	
2023	It's Showtime	Himself	
2023	Linlang	Lucas	
2023–2024	Can't Buy Me Love	Aldrich Co	
2025	Rainbow Rumble	Himself / Contestant	
2026	Someone, Someday	Kristoff	

== Accolades ==
Year	Work	Organization	Category	Result	Ref.
2016	"God Gave Me You" – Eat Bulaga! Lenten Drama Specials	PMPC Star Awards for Television	Best New Male TV Personality (Note: Tied with Simon Pineda.)	Won	
