= Aso ni San Roque =

Philippine television drama series

- Title card
- Also known as: San Roque's Pet
- Genre: Fantasy drama
- Created by: Jun Lana
- Developed by: Denoy Navarro-Punio
- Written by: Jules Katanyag; Des Garbes-Severino; Rona Lean Sales
- Directed by: Don Michael Perez
- Creative director: Jun Lana
- Starring: Mona Louise Rey
- Opening theme: "Itatawid Mo sa Landas" by Rocco Nacino
- Country of origin: Philippines
- Original language: Tagalog
- No. of episodes: 90

Production
- Executive producer: Winnie Hollis-Reyes
- Cinematography: Carlo S. Montano, Jr.
- Camera setup: Multiple-camera setup
- Running time: 20–31 minutes
- Production company: GMA Entertainment TV

Original release
- Network: GMA Network
- Release: September 10, 2012 – January 11, 2013

Aso ni San Roque (transl. dog of San Roque / international title: San Roque's Pet) is a Philippine television drama fantasy series broadcast by GMA Network. Directed by Don Michael Perez, it stars Mona Louise Rey. It premiered on September 10, 2012, on the network's Telebabad line up. The series concluded on January 11, 2013, with a total of 90 episodes.

The series is streaming online on YouTube.

== Premise ==
Separated from her birth parents at a young age, a blind girl–Fatima grows up under the protective wing of Ben, an old gay man under the control of a criminal syndicate. Ben has been her protector and uses Fatima's disability to help her escape hardships and mischief caused by the syndicate. Fatima is the daughter of a mortal man and a manananggal and the subject of a prophecy that spells the end of all evil beings on earth. As she reaches the age of seven, the search for her intensifies as witches, centaurs, mermaids and other malignant creatures join forces to prevent her from fulfilling the prophecy.

== Cast and characters ==
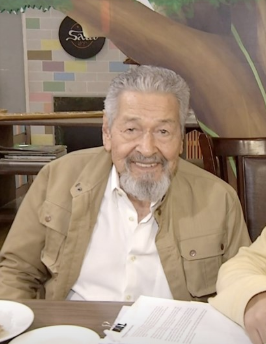
Eddie Garcia portrays Supremo.

=== Lead cast ===
- Mona Louise Rey as Fatima Salvador

A blind girl with a golden heart who is the offspring of a mortal and a manananggal. Behind her persona is a prophecy that destined her to end the dark forces that plaguing the human race. Because of this mission, her life is now in danger as the legions of darkness are lurking to kill her to prevent her from fulfilling the prophecy.

- Princess the dog as Anghel

=== Supporting cast ===
- LJ Reyes as Lualhati Salvador / Lourdes

Mateo's great love. Lourdes is a beautiful and kind-hearted young lady. But behind this beautiful persona concealed a dark secret—she belongs to a family of manananggal, but the reluctant one. This revelation altered the love Lourdes and Mateo hoped to share together for life. This dim chapter in Lourdes' life turns into a joy as she gives birth to Mateo's child—a beautiful baby girl she named Fatima. But another tragic twist of fate unwittingly leads Lourdes apart from her baby.

- TJ Trinidad as Mateo Salvador
- Pen Medina as Ben Asino

An old gay man who happens to be under the control of a syndicate. Loud and unconventional. He is a merry deviant in a cheerless world of misery and tears. He adopts Fatima and from then on, he became the sole protector of the poor, blind little girl.

- Eddie Garcia as Supremo
- Gardo Versoza as Kanlaon

The king of the "aswang ng hangin" or the winged-vampires, better known in Philippine mythology as manananggal. He goes to great lengths to find and kill Fatima to prevent her from fulfilling the prophecy.

- Angelika Dela Cruz as Bulan
- Gwen Zamora as Anaira
- Paolo Contis as Sento / Peter Silverio

The leader of the "aswang ng lupa" or the land-based aswangs. In his past life, he was Peter Silverio, a wealthy and popular equestrian who sold his soul to the devil to regain his strength and to have eternal life. Using his strength and fast ability, he preys on people that crosses his paths, most commonly virgin women and lost travelers.

- Rich Asuncion as Bernice Montemayor

An ambitious, aggressive and tough TV reporter/journalist. She is so focused and she would do everything to attain her goals and would do everything for the man she loves—Mateo. Although not intentionally she led Bulan and Sento to Fatima before she can get to Mateo and in the process, she became a mixture of aswang of lupa and apoy by them.

- Eddie Garcia as Danilo P. Aragon
- Boots Anson-Roa as Constancia Aragon
- Gene Padilla as Paul Andrade
- Nova Villa as Ofelia Sandoval
- Buboy Garovillo as Noah

A former clergyman who lost his mind after he witnessed the tragic death of his family.

=== Guest cast ===
- Rafael Rosell as Anton Martinez
- Diva Montelaba as Ruka
- Ehra Madrigal as Lena Martinez
- Sherilyn Reyes-Tan as Diga
- Gerard Pizarras as Iwak
- Raquel Montesa as Anton's mother
- Ervic Vijandre as Robert Tolentino
- Ryza Cenon as Grace Santos
- Mariz Ricketts as Rosa Santiago
- Djanin Cruz as Zita Dizon
- Kiel Rodriguez as Timo Magno
- Roldan Aquino as General
- Miguel Tanfelix as Onyok
- Julian Marcus Trono as Joem
- Chinggay Riego as Oryang
- Mary Joy Gula as Kiting
- Barbara Miguel as Didi
- Elvis Gutierrez as Marcus

== Development ==
Originally created/conceptualized by writer and director, Jun Lana for GMA Network, Aso ni San Roque is a drama-fantasy-adventure serial lies in the old "battle between good and evil" plot. Contrary to the first report published in entertainment news website, PEP, the series is not based from Lana's 2012 Cinemalaya Philippine Independent Film Festival entry, Bwakaw. Lana clarifies that the series is actually inspired from San Roque and his canine's moving story. San Roque, also known as Saint Roch or Saint Rocco, is the saint usually depicted in statue form in Catholic churches as the one with a walking stick on the left hand, while the other hand is pointing on to a wound on one of his knees with a dog sitting by his side. The Catholic Church named him patron of dogs, plague, pestilence and AIDS. He is also the patron saint of invalids. In the series, San Roque brought his dog come to life to save and be a guide to Fatima, the blessed child who prophesied to be the one who will end the existence of evil entities on earth.

The series also highlights Pinoy mythology by putting aswang, manananggal, tikbalang, bruha and sirena as part [villains] of the story. Series' director, Don Michael Perez stated that, the network is aiming to enrich Filipinos [especially the young ones] knowledge of the country's rich culture, beliefs and mythology by using this kind of concept, just like what the network did in their past television series, in the likes of Darna, Dyesebel, Joaquin Bordado and Luna Mystika. In the story, the aswangs are divided into four classes: Aswang ng Hangin, most commonly known as the manananggals or the winged-vampires. It headed by the dreadful Kanlaon which played by Gardo Versoza; the Aswang ng Lupa or the land-based evil entities, who ruled by Sento, played by Paolo Contis, the heartless half-human, half-horse creature popularly known as the tikbalang; Aswang ng Tubig or the sea-based evil creatures. It headed by Queen Anaira, an evil mermaid portrayed by Gwen Zamora; and the Aswang ng Apoy or the fire-powered witches ruled by Bulan, played by Angelika dela Cruz.

=== Casting ===
The cast was first presented during the series' story conference held on August 2, 2012, at GMA Network Center. Mona Louise Rey was chosen to play the role of Fatima, the protagonist. Rey, who rose in stardom after the drama series

Princess, a two-year-old half Golden Retriever and half Cocker Spaniel, was chosen to be part of the series as Anghel, San Roque's dog who defend and guide the main character through her adventures. Don Michael Perez said, "Princess, is definitely born to be a star," he says. The dog's trainer Ergie Estrella said that he did not encounter difficulty in training the star dog, saying that all it takes is positive reinforcement.

TJ Trinidad and LJ Reyes shared equally important roles in the series. Reyes considered this series as her biggest break ever. After being typecast in villain characters [she's associated in her villainous roles in Time of My Life and The Good Daughter, the network assigned her to play one of the main characters in the series, as birthmother of Mona Louise Rey's character. In one of her interviews, Reyes said that it's her first time to play a mother role on TV but she doesn't mind doing it as long as the story is good and the character, as well.

The dark forces or the main antagonists of the story are portrayed by Angelika dela Cruz, Gardo Versoza, Gwen Zamora and Paolo Contis. Dela Cruz was cast as Bulan, an evil witch and the leader of the syndicate; Versoza playing Kanlaon, the king of the manananggals; Zamora playing the role of Anaira, an evil mermaid; while Contis playing the role of Sento, the leader of the tikbalangs.

Rafael Rosell had a guest role in the series. He played Anton, the man who saved LJ Reyes' character from the wrath of manananggals. This served as his first project in GMA Network.

Pen Medina was cast as mother Ben, an elderly gay and the adoptive parent to the lead character. Originally, the role was offered to Eddie Garcia. Due to health concern, Garcia later requested the producers to give him a less time-demanding character. He portrayed the role of Supremo, instead.

== Ratings ==
According to AGB Nielsen Philippines' Mega Manila household television ratings, the pilot episode of Aso ni San Roque earned a 26.2% rating. The final episode scored a 24.2% rating.
