= Carmela: Ang Pinakamagandang Babae sa Mundong Ibabaw =

2014 Philippine television drama series

- Title card
- Also known as: Carmela
- Genre: Romantic drama
- Created by: Suzette Doctolero
- Written by: Suzette Doctolero; Paul Sta. Ana; Jason Lim; Angeli Delgado
- Directed by: Dominic Zapata
- Creative director: Jun Lana
- Starring: Marian Rivera; Alden Richards
- Theme music composer: Vehnee Saturno
- Opening theme: "Sana'y Ikaw" by James Wright
- Ending theme: "Naaalala Ka" by Alden Richards
- Composer: Tata Betita
- Country of origin: Philippines
- Original language: Tagalog
- No. of episodes: 83

Production
- Executive producer: Carolyn B. Galve
- Production locations: Bulacan, Philippines
- Camera setup: Multiple-camera setup
- Running time: 18–38 minutes
- Production company: GMA Entertainment TV

Original release
- Network: GMA Network
- Release: January 27 – May 23, 2014

Carmela: Ang Pinakamagandang Babae sa Mundong Ibabaw (transl. Carmela: the most beautiful girl in the world) is a 2014 Philippine television drama romance series broadcast by GMA Network. Conceptualized by writer Suzette Doctolero and directed by Dominic Zapata, it stars Marian Rivera in the title role and Alden Richards. It premiered on January 27, 2014 on the network's Telebabad line up. The series concluded on May 23, 2014, with a total of 83 episodes.

The series is streaming online on YouTube.

== Cast and characters ==
Cast

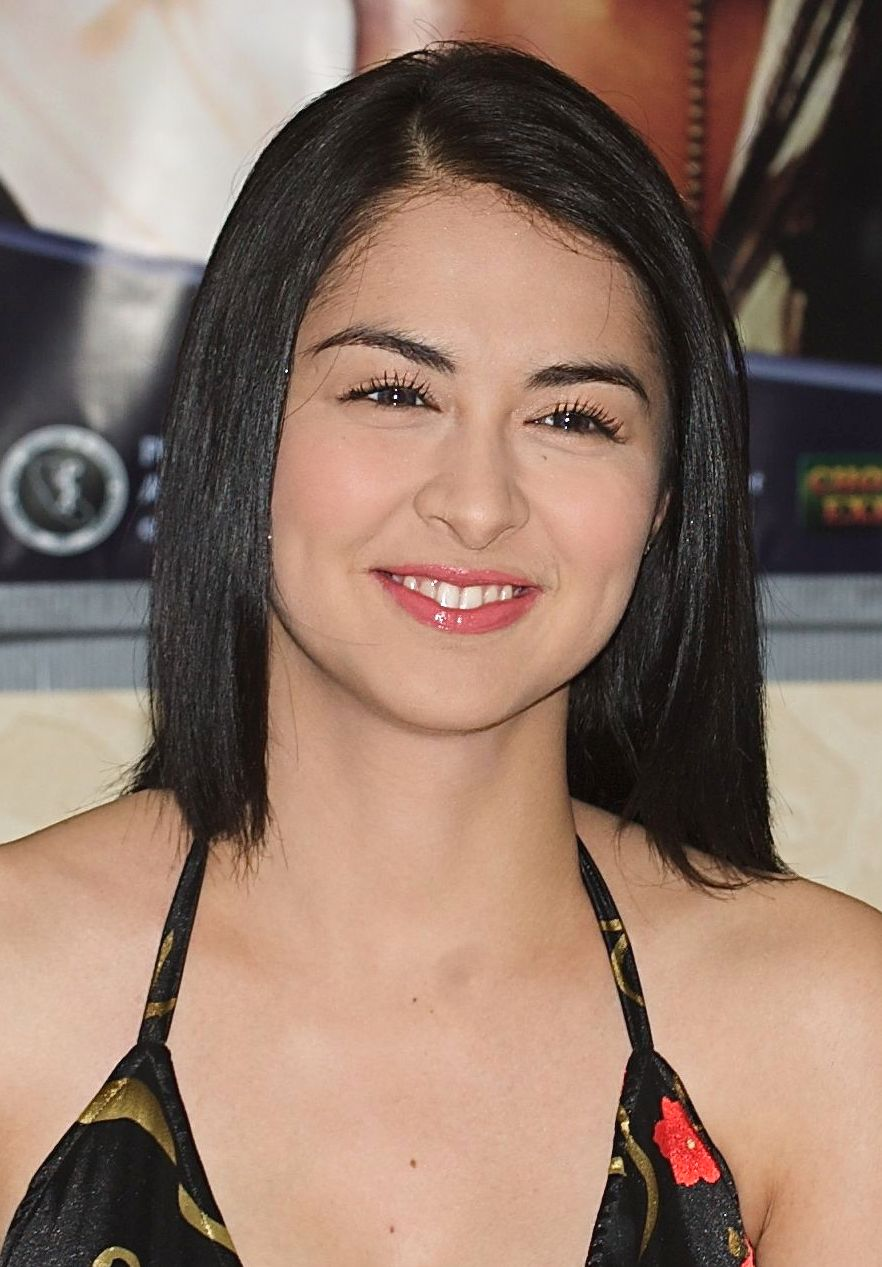
Marian Rivera

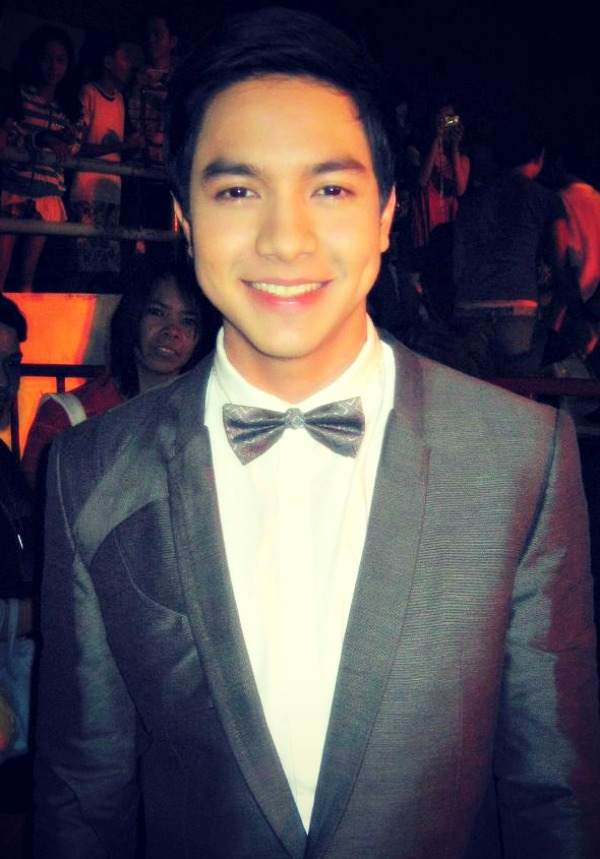
Alden Richards

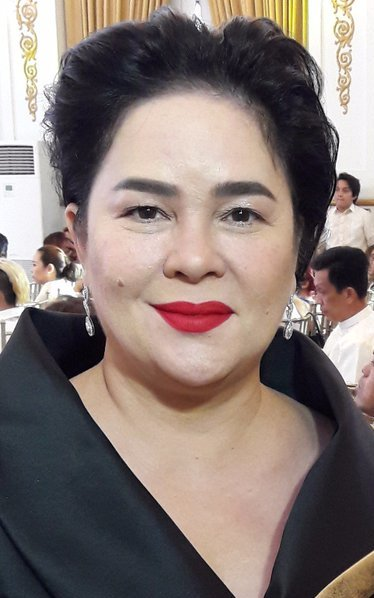
Jaclyn Jose

Lead cast

- Marian Rivera as Carmela Fernandez / Catarina Bulaong
- Alden Richards as Santiago "Yago" Torres Flores

Supporting cast

- Jaclyn Jose as Patricia "Trixie" Torres
- Laurice Guillen as Fides Hernando-Torres
- Agot Isidro as Amanda Fernandez
- Raymond Bagatsing as Dante Hernando
- Jennica Garcia as Alliyah Hernando
- Rochelle Pangilinan as Yolanda "Yolly" Montesilva
- Roi Vinzon as Fernando Torres
- Freddie Webb as Ramon Corpuz
- Krystal Reyes as Janine Torres
- Ana Feleo as Nida Torres
- RJ Padilla as JP
- Eva Darren as Wagay

Recurring cast

- Barbara Miguel as Linggit
- Mike Lloren as Zaldy
- Kenneth Paul Cruz as Wally
- Lloyd Samartino as Efren Flores

Guest cast

- Ricky Davao as Danilo "Dan" Fernandez
- Mona Louise Rey as younger Carmela
- Stephanie Sol as Mithi
- Shyr Valdez as Choleng
- Bea Binene as Eunice
- Bryan Benedict as Leo
- Giselle Toengi as Odette

== Casting ==
The role of Dante was initially offered to actor Gabby Concepcion, it was eventually given to Raymond Bagatsing.

== Production ==
Principal photography was held in Malolos, Bulacan and concluded on May 14, 2014. During an evening shoot on May 9, a scuffle broke out between the Carmela crew and a group of men when the latter attempted to enter a closed bar the crew was temporarily using as a set.

== Ratings ==
According to AGB Nielsen Philippines' Mega Manila household television ratings, the pilot episode of Carmela: Ang Pinakamagandang Babae sa Mundong Ibabaw earned an 18.1% rating. The final episode scored a 22.2% rating.
