= Magkano Ba ang Pag-ibig? =

Philippine television drama series

- Title card
- Also known as: Wealth and Passion
- Genre: Romantic drama
- Written by: Gilbeys Sardea; Rhoda Sulit; Michiko Yamamoto
- Directed by: Maryo J. de los Reyes
- Creative director: Jun Lana
- Starring: Heart Evangelista
- Theme music composer: Vehnee Saturno
- Opening theme: "Sa Aking Panaginip" by Kyla
- Country of origin: Philippines
- Original language: Tagalog
- No. of episodes: 100

Production
- Executive producer: Joseph T. Aleta
- Production locations: Quezon City, Philippines
- Camera setup: Multiple-camera setup
- Running time: 21–33 minutes
- Production company: GMA Entertainment TV

Original release
- Network: GMA Network
- Release: September 30, 2013 – February 14, 2014

Magkano Ba ang Pag-ibig? (transl. how much is the love? / international title: Wealth and Passion) is a Philippine television drama romance series broadcast by GMA Network. Directed by Maryo J. de los Reyes, it stars Heart Evangelista. It premiered on September 30, 2013, on the network's Afternoon Prime line up. The series concluded on February 14, 2014, with a total of 100 episodes.

The series is streaming online on YouTube.

== Cast and characters ==
Cast

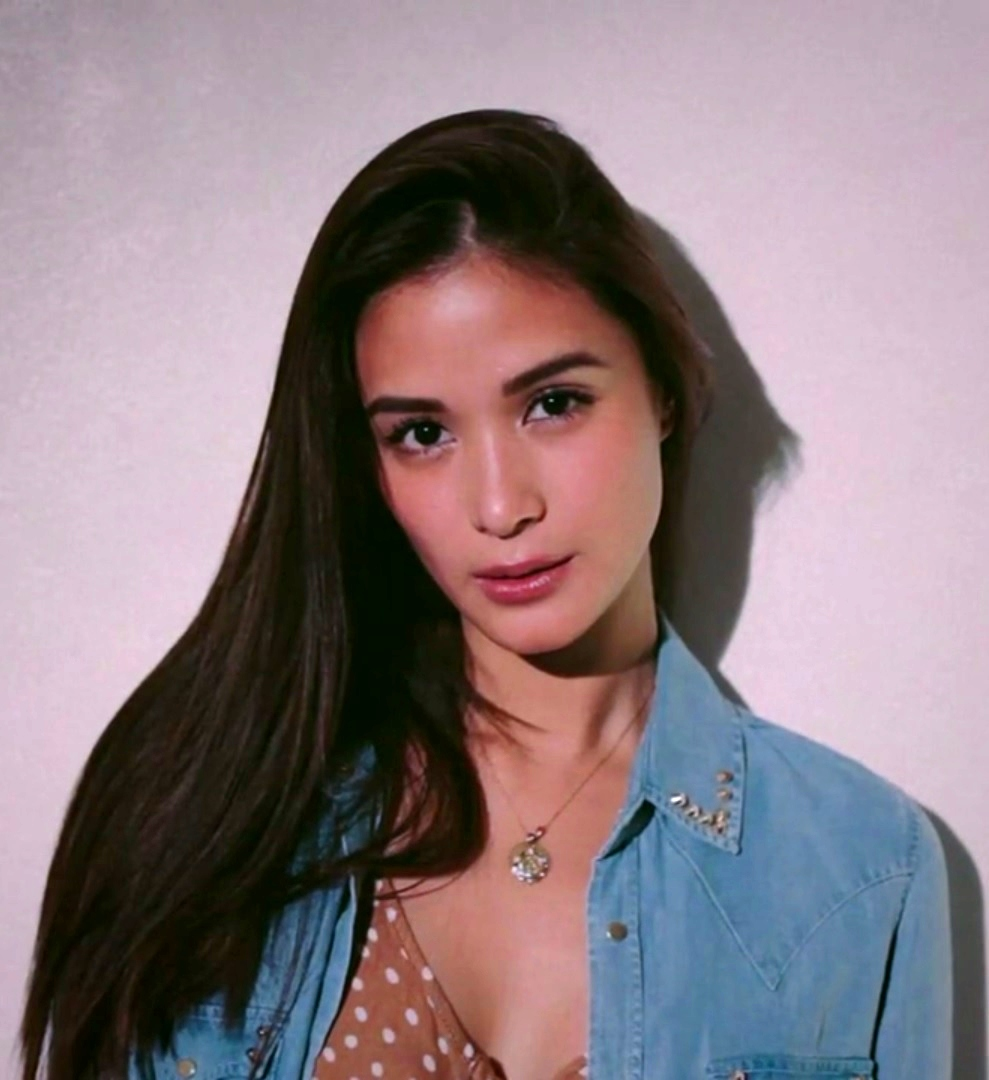
Heart Evangelista

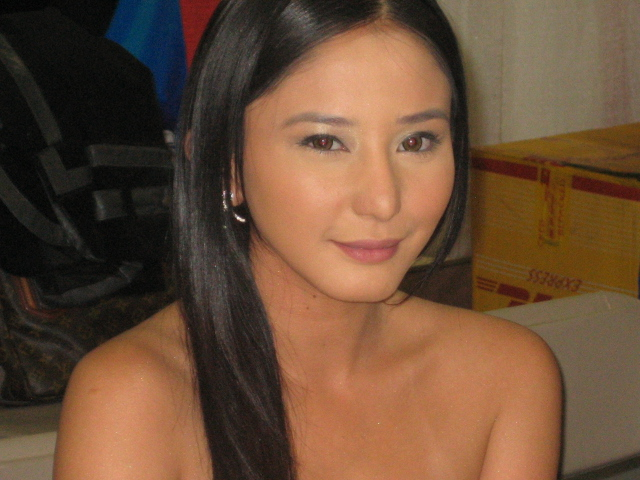
Katrina Halili

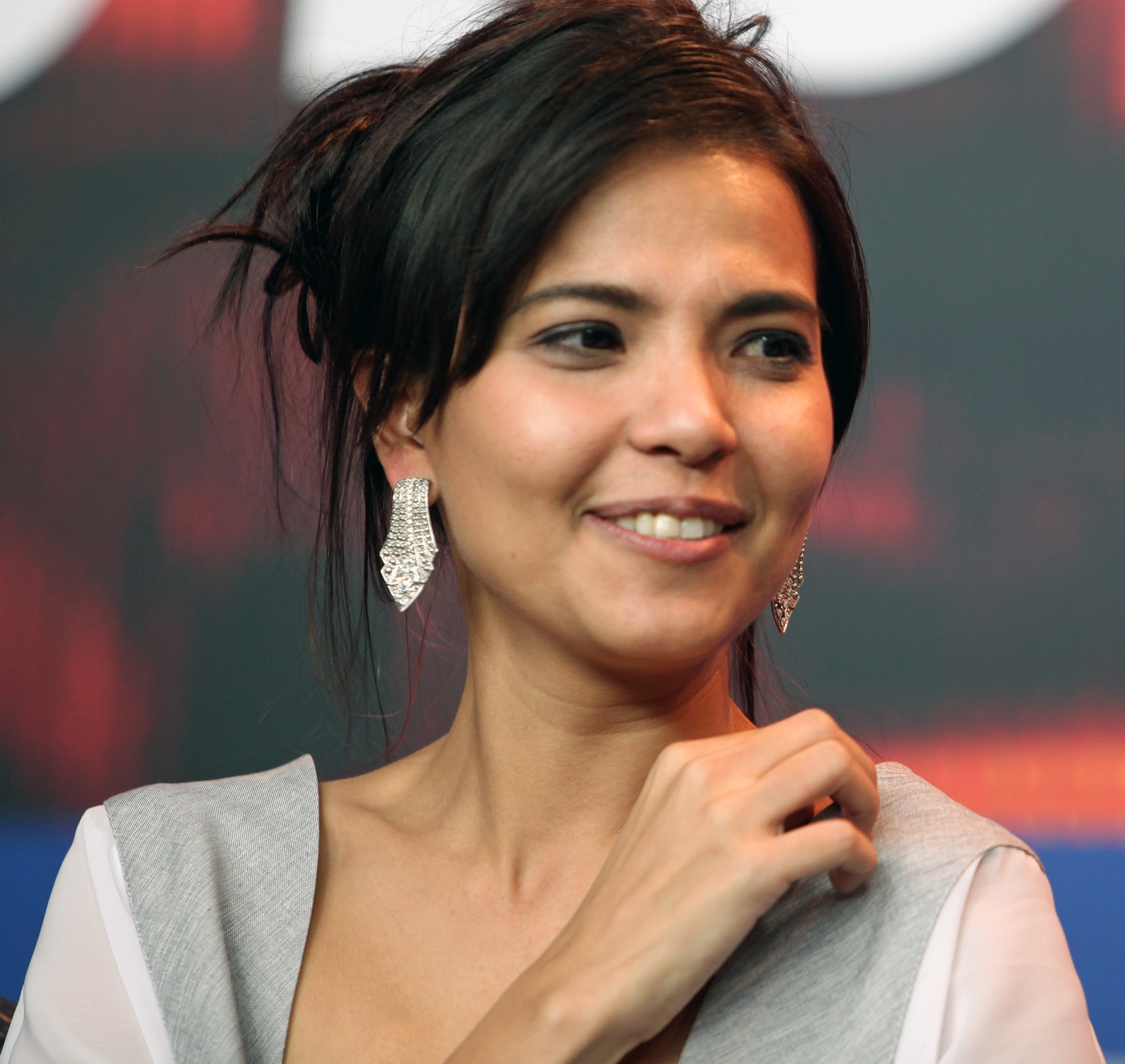
Alessandra De Rossi

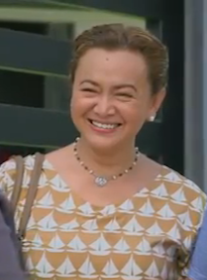
Sharmaine Buencamino

Lead cast

- Heart Evangelista as Eloisa Aguirre

Supporting cast

- Sid Lucero as Luciano "Lucio" Aragon / Chino Aguirre
- Dominic Roco as Bobby Buenaventura
- Katrina Halili as Margarita "Margot" Cruz
- Alessandra De Rossi as Geraldine "Gigi" Buenaventura
- Isabel Oli as Richelle Mangahas
- Ana Capri as Lualhati Macaraeg
- Pen Medina as Andoy Aguirre
- Shamaine Centenera-Buencamino as Loida Aguirre
- Mariel Pamintuan as Mila Aguirre
- Angelo Ilagan as Bryce
- Luz Valdez as Rosing Villasanta
- Vangie Labalan as Sonia Aguirre
- Tintin Ng as Liling
- Rommel Padilla as Oscar Ramos
- Celia Rodriguez as Hilaria Buenaventura

Guest cast

- Roseanne Magan as younger Eloisa
- Vincent Magbanua as younger Lucio
- Kiel Rodriguez as younger Chino
- Jhiz Deocareza as younger Bobby
- Mona Louise Rey as younger Margot
- Lauren Young as younger Lualhati
- Jillian Ward as younger Richelle

== Ratings ==
According to AGB Nielsen Philippines' Mega Manila household television ratings, the pilot episode of Magkano Ba ang Pag-ibig? earned a 12.4% rating. The final episode scored a 15.9% rating.

== Accolades ==
Accolades received by Magkano Ba ang Pag-ibig?
Year	Award	Category	Recipient	Result	Ref.
2014	28th PMPC Star Awards for Television	Best Daytime Drama Series	Magkano Ba ang Pag-ibig?	Nominated	
