= Luna Mystika =

Philippine television drama series

- Title card
- Genre: Fantasy drama
- Created by: R.J. Nuevas
- Written by: R.J. Nuevas
- Directed by: Mike Tuviera; Gil Tejada Jr.
- Starring: Heart Evangelista
- Theme music composer: Ogie Alcasid; Bobby Velasco
- Opening theme: "Tanging Ikaw" by Ogie Alcasid
- Country of origin: Philippines
- Original language: Tagalog
- No. of episodes: 80

Production
- Executive producer: Helen Rose S. Sese
- Production locations: Metro Manila, Philippines
- Camera setup: Multiple-camera setup
- Running time: 21–46 minutes
- Production company: GMA Entertainment TV

Original release
- Network: GMA Network
- Release: November 17, 2008 – March 6, 2009

Related
- Luna Blanca

Luna Mystika (transl. Luna mysticism) is a Philippine television drama fantasy series broadcast by GMA Network. Directed by Michael Tuviera and Gil Tejada Jr., it stars Heart Evangelista in the title role. It premiered on November 17, 2008, on the network's Telebabad line up. The series concluded on March 6, 2009, with a total of 80 episodes.

A sequel, Luna Blanca aired in 2012. The series is streaming online on YouTube.

== Cast and characters ==
Cast

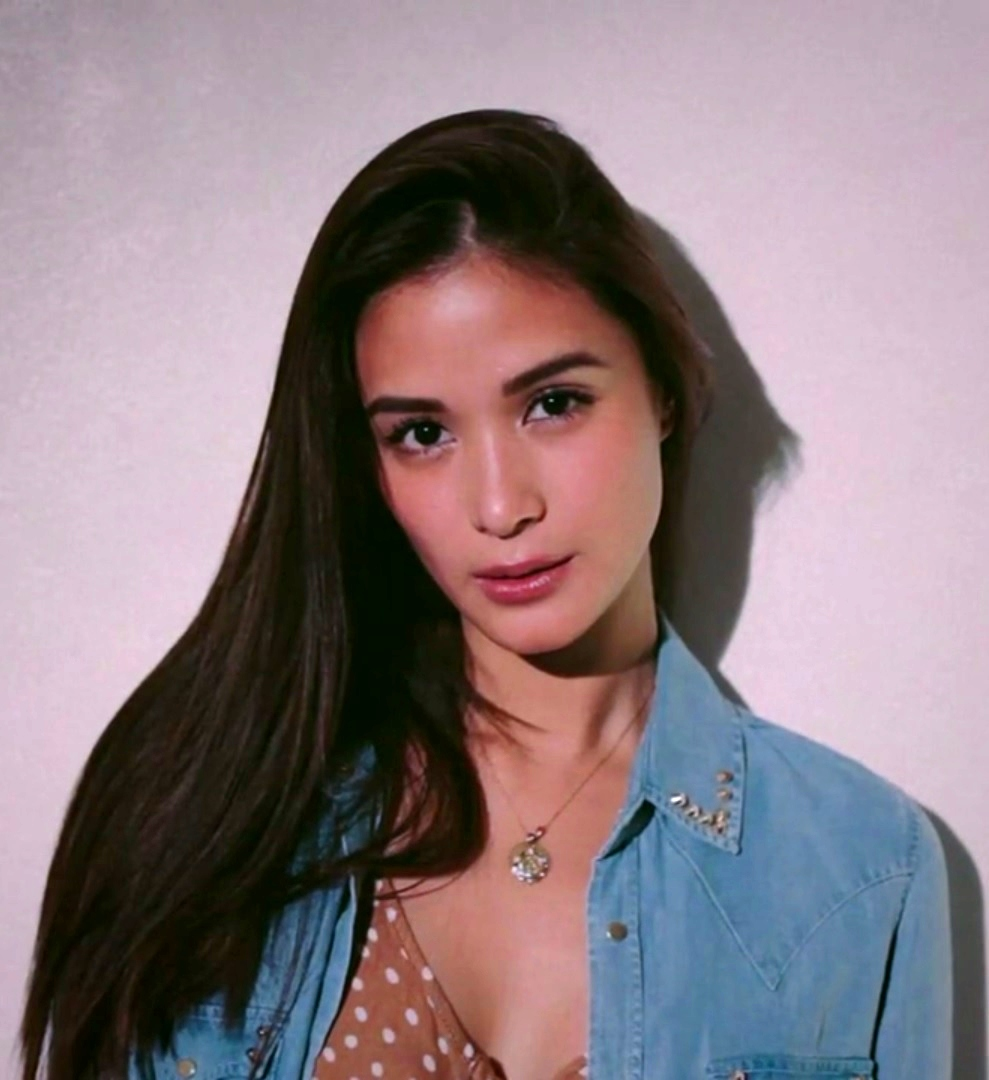
Heart Evangelista

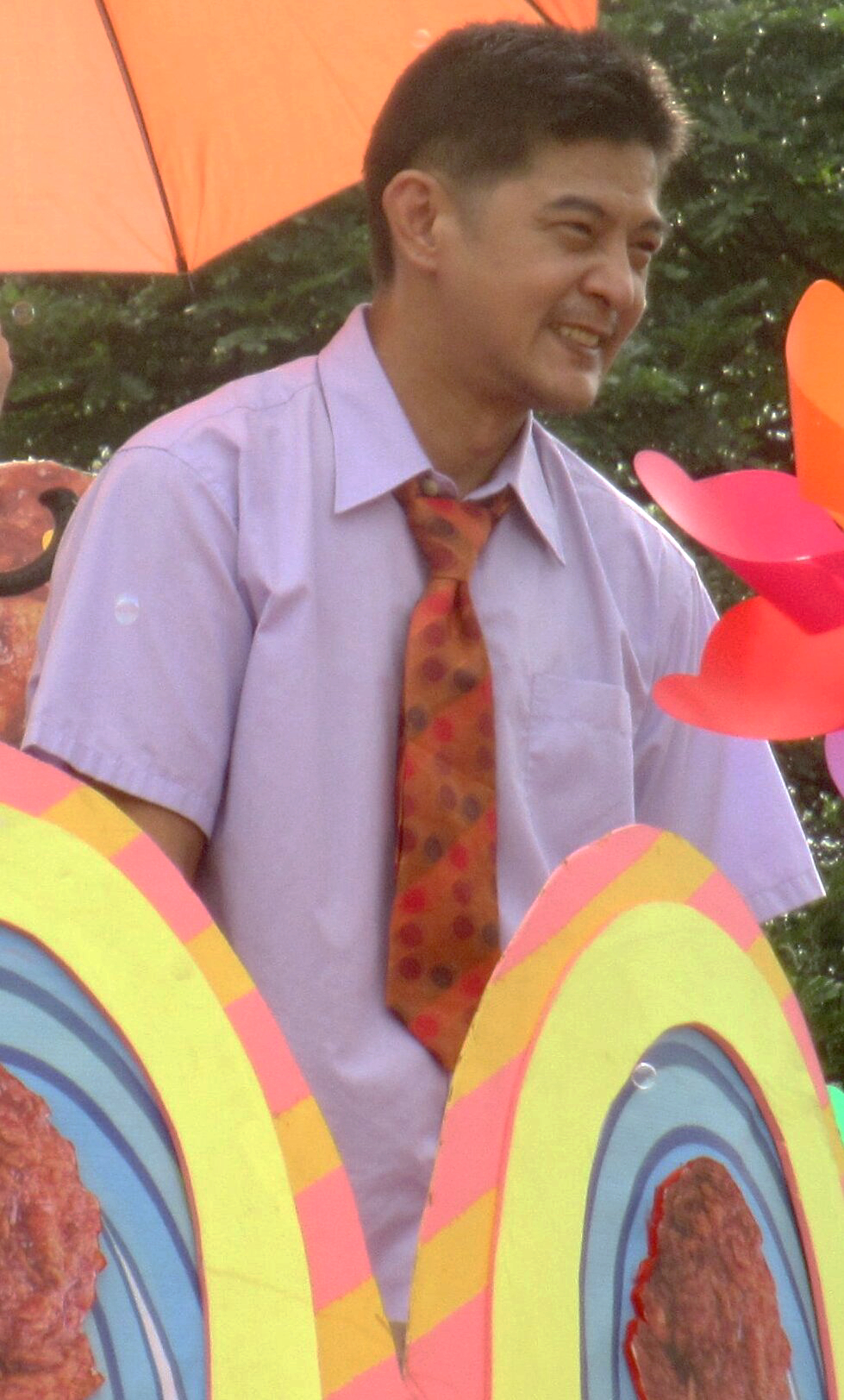
Romnick Sarmenta

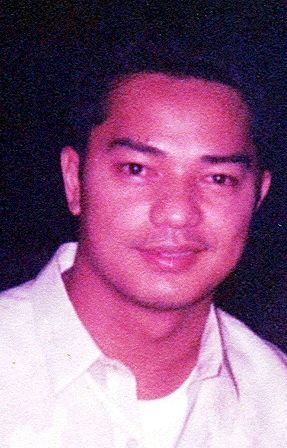
Ariel Rivera

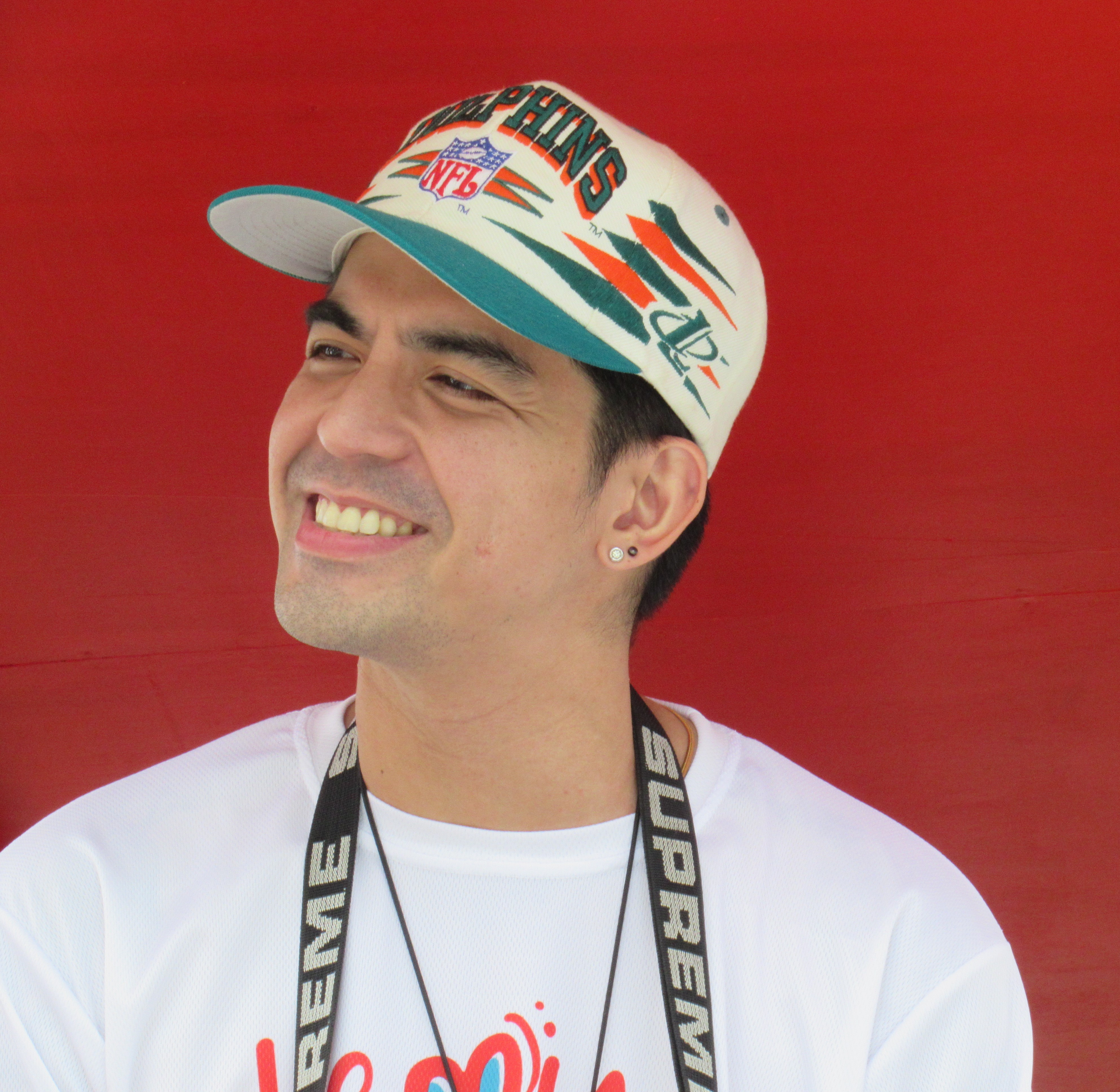
Mark Herras

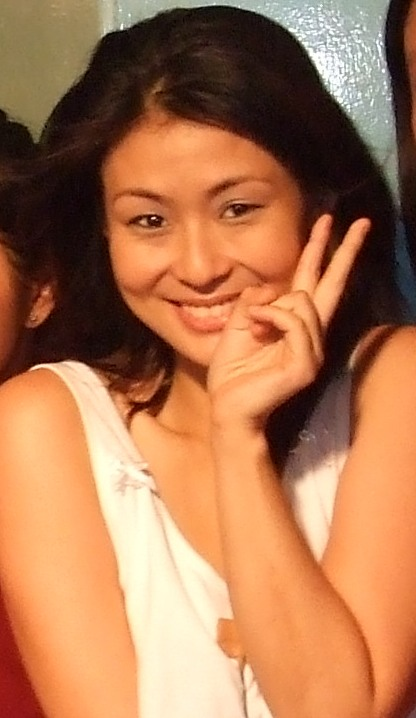
Iwa Moto

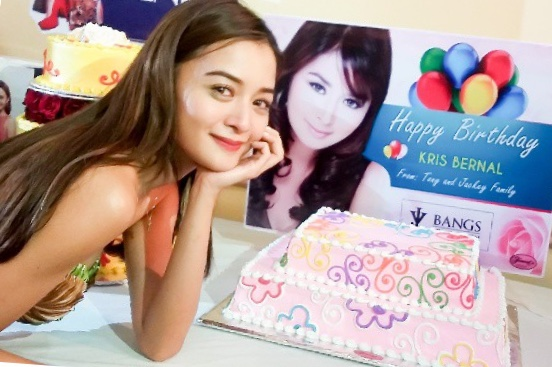
Kris Bernal

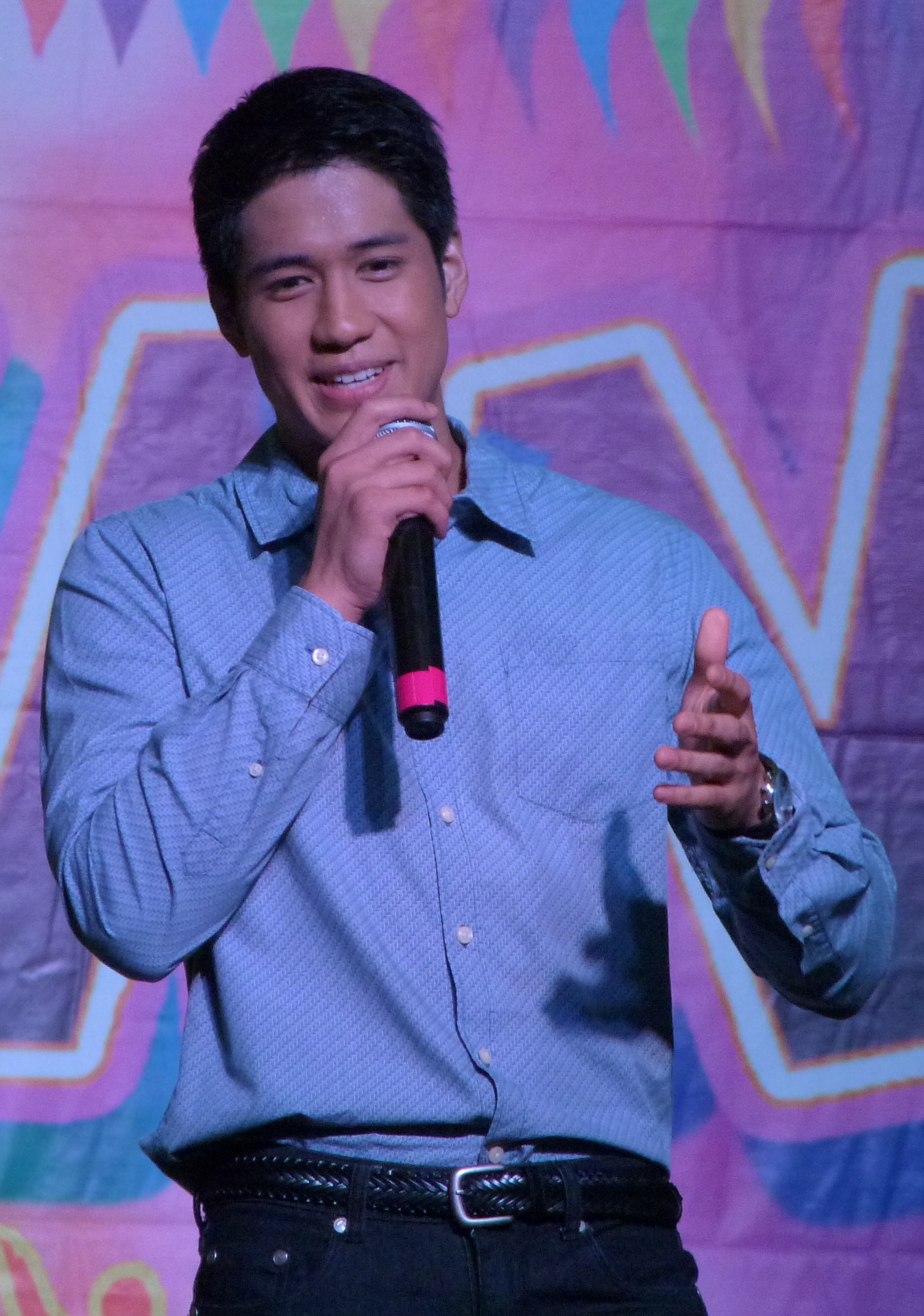
Aljur Abrenica

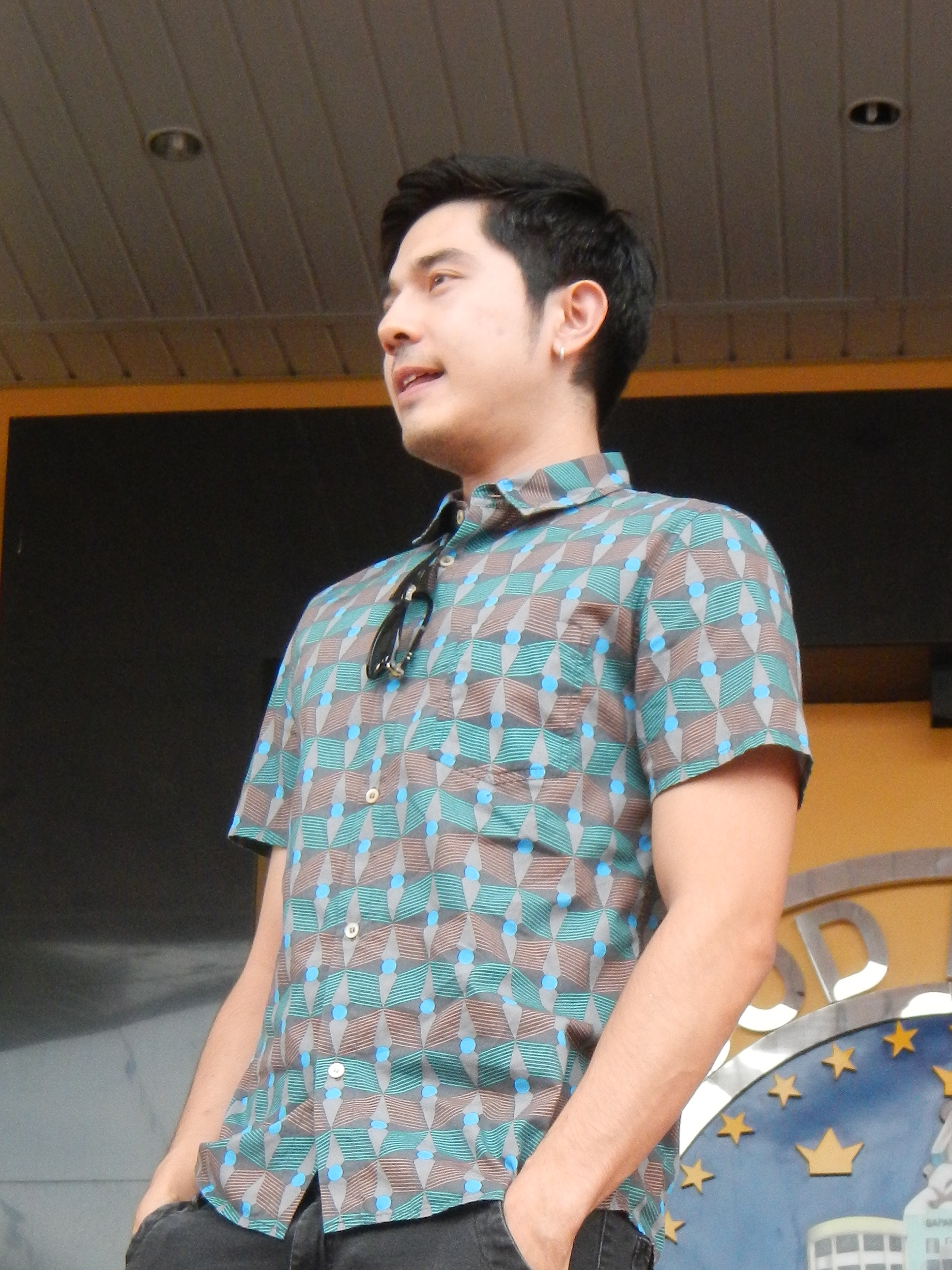
Paulo Avelino

Lead cast

- Heart Evangelista as Luna Sagrado-Samaniego / Celestina Sagrado

Supporting cast

- Mark Anthony Fernandez as Dexter Samaniego
- Dante Rivero as Joaquin Sagrado / Agnon
- Chanda Romero as Benita Sagrado
- Sheryl Cruz as Alice Sagrado
- Romnick Sarmenta as Dominic Samaniego
- Rita Avila as Diana Sagrado
- Gardo Versoza as Dante / Sikano
- Ariel Rivera as Simon Samaniego / Ybarra Montecillo
- Mark Herras as Kamilo
- Luis Alandy as Andoy
- Kris Bernal as Malou
- Aljur Abrenica as Libado
- Iwa Moto as Donita Sagrado
- John Lapus as Karya
- Beth Tamayo as Lanie Samaniego
- Pauleen Luna as Adita
- Michelle Madrigal as Anata
- Hero Angeles as Alguwas
- Ces Quesada as Gina
- Melissa Mendez as Bessie
- Mosang as Piryang
- Marky Lopez as Efren
- Bearwin Meily as Bikodong
- Jade Lopez as Susing
- Paulo Avelino as Johnny
- Prince Stefan as Henry
- Jace Flores as Lucas

Recurring cast

- Eagle Riggs as Agwas
- Sheree as Organa
- Jenny Miller as Aligwa
- Christian Vasquez as Milawon

Guest cast

- Sandy Talag as younger Luna

== Production ==
Principal photography commenced on October 24, 2008. Filming concluded in February 2009.

== Ratings ==
According to AGB Nielsen Philippines' Mega Manila household television ratings, the pilot episode of Luna Mystika earned a 38.9% rating. The final episode scored a 37.3% rating.

== Accolades ==
Accolades received by Luna Mystika
Year	Award	Category	Recipient	Result	Ref.
2009	23rd PMPC Star Awards for Television	Best Primetime Drama Series	Luna Mystika	Nominated	
