= Munting Heredera =

Philippine television drama series

- Title card
- Also known as: Little Heiress
- Genre: Drama
- Written by: Agnes Gagelonia-Uligan; Michiko Yamamoto; Maribel Ilag; Gilbeys Sardea
- Directed by: Maryo J. de los Reyes
- Creative director: Jun Lana
- Starring: Mona Louise Rey
- Theme music composer: Gary Valenciano; Joy Nilo
- Opening theme: "Ang Aking Munting Bituin" by La Diva
- Ending theme: "Sa Isip Ko" by Rachelle Ann Go
- Country of origin: Philippines
- Original language: Tagalog
- No. of episodes: 195

Production
- Executive producer: Nieva M. Sabit
- Production locations: Manila, Philippines
- Camera setup: Multiple-camera setup
- Running time: 17–36 minutes
- Production company: GMA Entertainment TV

Original release
- Network: GMA Network
- Release: May 9, 2011 – February 3, 2012

Munting Heredera (trans. / international title: Little Heiress) is a Philippine television drama series broadcast by GMA Network. Directed by Maryo J. de los Reyes, it stars Mona Louise Rey in the title role. It premiered on May 9, 2011 on the network's Telebabad line up. The series concluded on February 3, 2012, with a total of 195 episodes.

The series is streaming online on YouTube.

== Cast and characters ==
Cast

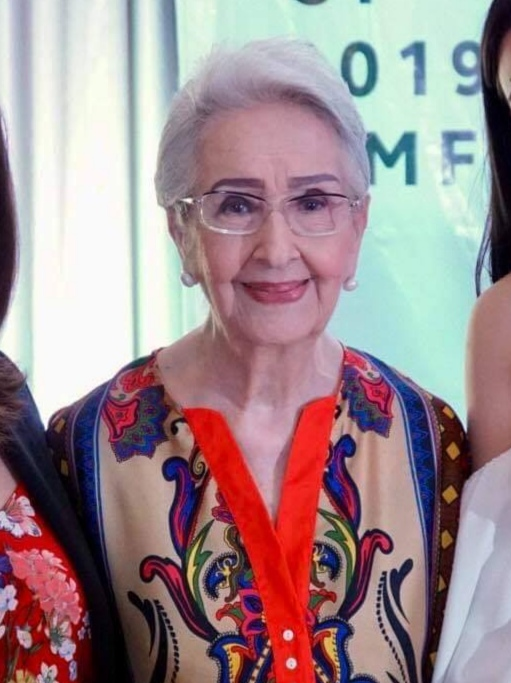
Gloria Romero

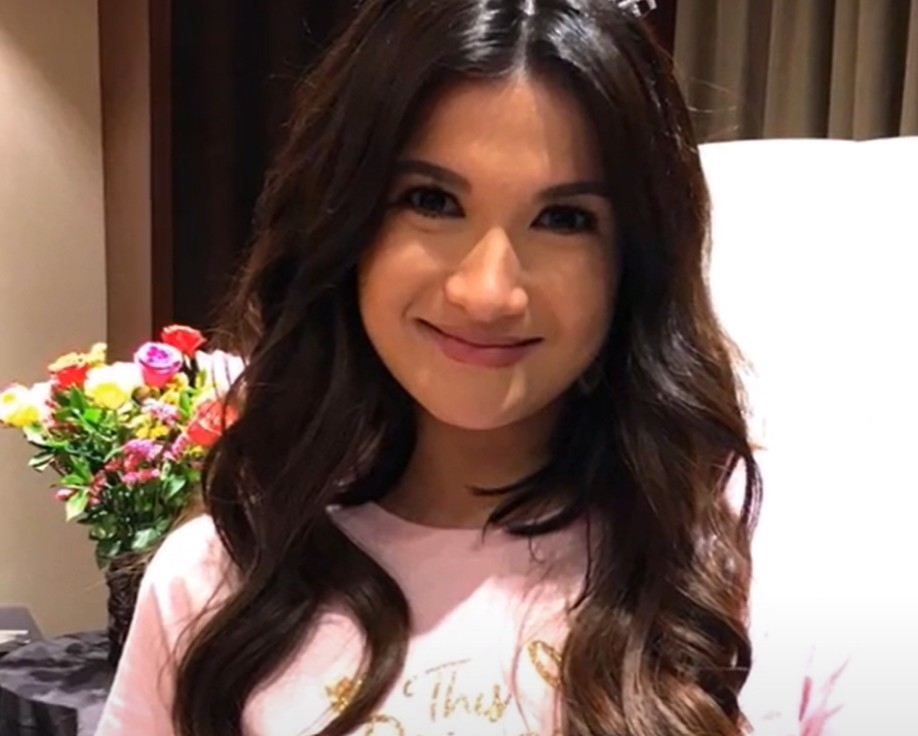
Camille Prats

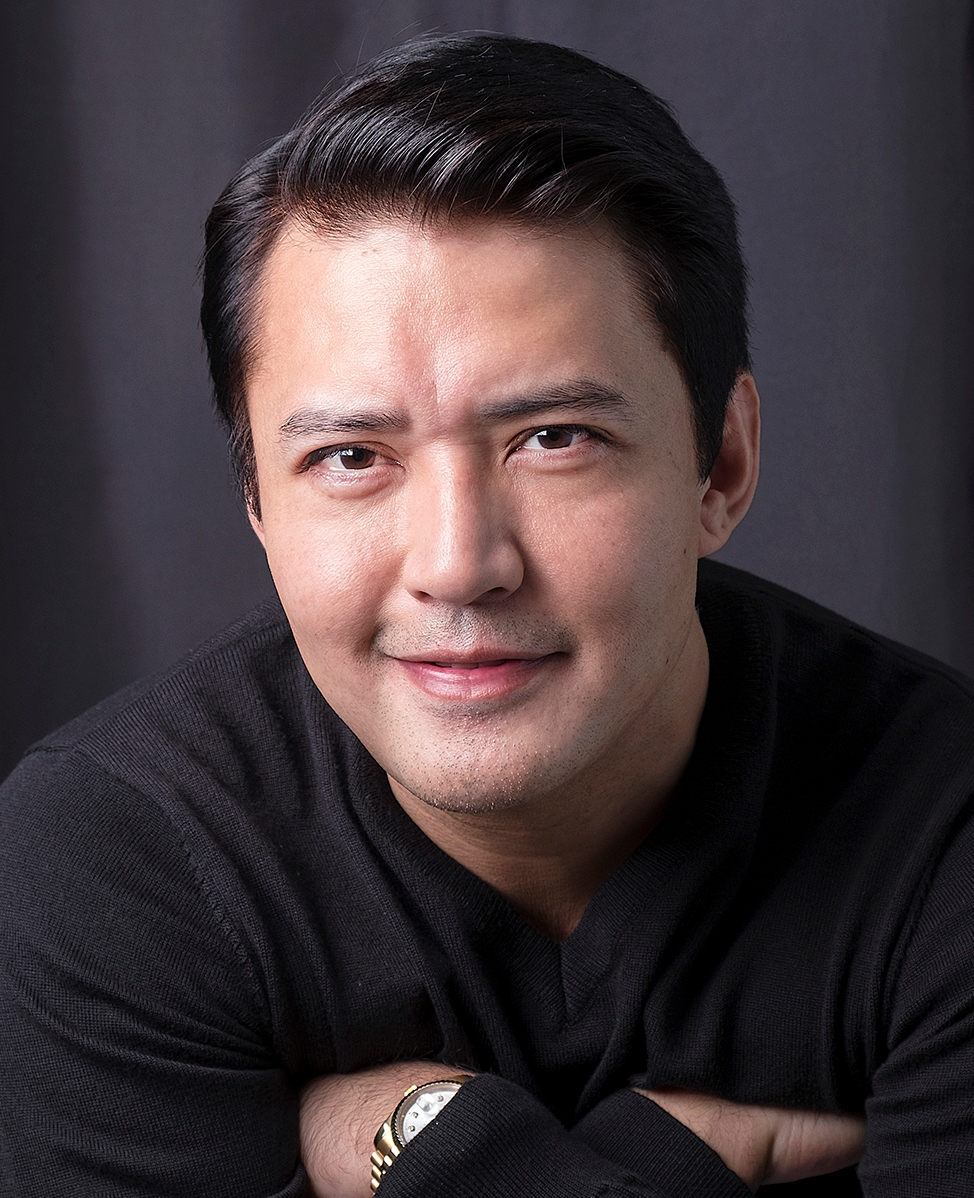
Mark Anthony Fernandez

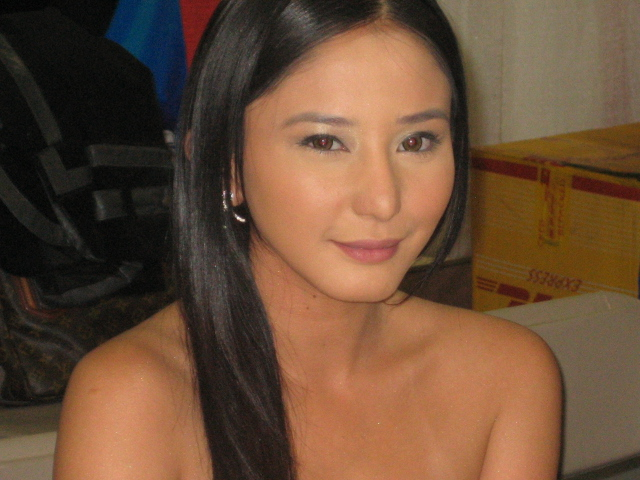
Katrina Halili

Lead cast

- Mona Louise Rey as Jennifer "Jenny" S. Montereal

Supporting cast

- Gloria Romero as Anastacia "Ana" Montereal-Lobregat
- Mark Anthony Fernandez as Jacob Montereal
- Camille Prats as Sandra Santiago-Montereal/Susan Velasco
- Katrina Halili as Lynette Sarmiento-Montereal
- Roderick Paulate as Emmanuel "Manny" Mejia
- Gabby Eigenmann as Desmond Montereal / Michael Sison
- Leandro Baldemor as Philip Arboleda
- Ynez Veneracion as Claire Montereal
- Neil Ryan Sese as Simeon Velasco
- Krystal Reyes as Gemmalyn "Gemma" Sarmiento
- Kristoffer Martin as Timothy James "TJ" Navarro-Arboleda
- Joyce Ching as Kyla Montereal
- Luz Valdez as Maria Montereal
- Barbara Miguel as Calilla S. Arboleda
- Kyle Ocampo as Michelle S. Velasco

Guest cast

- Robert Arevalo as Enrique Lobregat
- Boots Anson-Roa as Ingrid Spencer-Lobregat
- Bobby Andrews as Stanley Lobregat
- Andrea del Rosario as Kate Lobregat
- Jesus Ramon as Allen Lobregat
- Rammy Bitong as Marlon
- Miggs Cuaderno as Tonton
- Matet de Leon as Helen
- Orlando Dela Cruz as Emong
- Deborah Sun as Meding
- Sharmaine Arnaiz as Maritess / Lulu
- Elijah Alejo as Abigail
- Sue Prado as Nerissa
- Marita Zobel as Veronica
- Shiela Marie Rodriguez as Pipa
- Julio Diaz as Toto
- Kryshee Grengia as Nini
- Nathaniel Britt as Bugoy
- Madeleine Nicolas as Aurora

== Production ==
Principal photography commenced on April 16, 2011.

== Ratings ==
According to AGB Nielsen Philippines' Mega Manila household television ratings, the final episode scored a 27.7% rating.

== Accolades ==
Accolades received by Munting Heredera
Year	Award	Category	Recipient	Result	Ref.
2011	8th Golden Screen TV Awards	Outstanding Original Drama Series	Munting Heredera	Nominated	
2011	8th Golden Screen TV Awards	Outstanding Supporting Actor in a Drama Series	Gabby Eigenmann Roderick Paulate	Won	
2011	8th Golden Screen TV Awards	Outstanding Supporting Actor in a Drama Series	Gabby Eigenmann Roderick Paulate	Nominated	
2011	8th Golden Screen TV Awards	Outstanding Supporting Actress in a Drama Series	Gloria Romero	Nominated	
2012	17th Asian Television Awards	Best Actor in a Supporting Role	Gabby Eigenmann	Nominated	
2012	26th PMPC Star Awards for Television	Best Child Performer	Mona Louise Rey	Nominated	
2012	26th PMPC Star Awards for Television	Best Drama Series	Munting Heredera	Nominated	
2013	10th Golden Screen TV Awards	Outstanding Original Drama Series	Munting Heredera	Nominated	
2013	10th Golden Screen TV Awards	Outstanding Supporting Actor in a Drama Series	Neil Ryan Sese	Won	
2013	10th Golden Screen TV Awards	Outstanding Supporting Actor in a Drama Series	Gabby Eigenmann	Nominated	

== Remake ==
In 2016, Munting Heredera was slated to have an adaptation in Mexico, marking the first drama series by GMA Network to be adapted by a Latin country. It was to be produced by Telefilm Atlantico S.A.
