= Glaiza de Castro filmography =

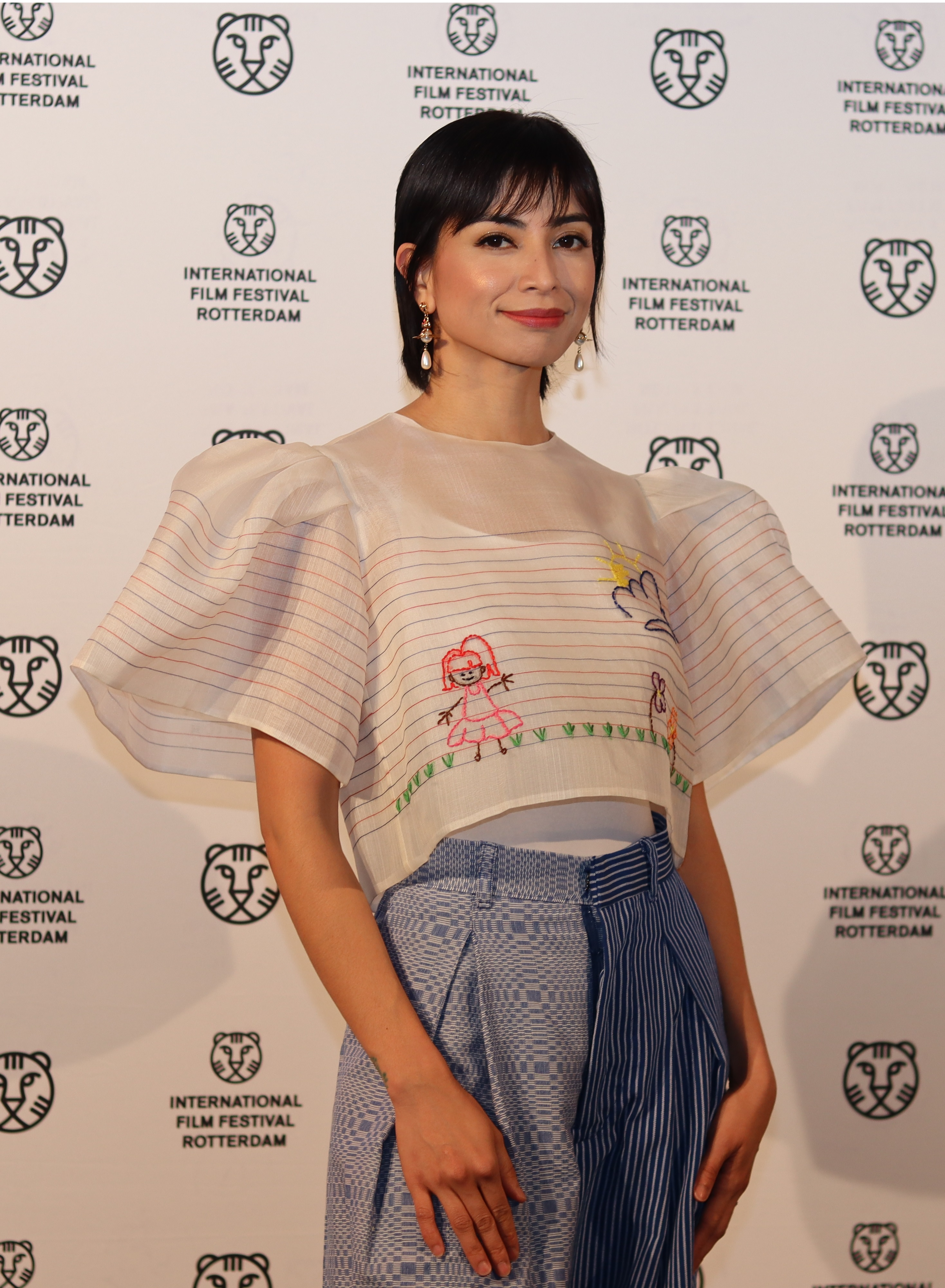
De Castro at the International Film Festival Rotterdam in 2026 for the premiere of 58th

Filipino actress and singer Glaiza de Castro has appeared in numerous film and television productions. Her screen debut was in the variety show Master Showman Presents in January 2001, while her film debut was in Cool Dudes 24/7 and her television acting debut was in the series Kasangga, both within the same year. Over the next five years, de Castro appeared in the television series Ikaw Lang ang Mamahalin (2001), Berks (2002–2004), Spirits (2004–2005), Ikaw ang Lahat sa Akin (2005) and Fantastikids (2006). During this period, she appeared in the Regal Entertainment-produced Singsing ni Lola (2002) and the independently-produced Miss-Pinoy (2005). In 2006, de Castro's film appearances included Manay Po, Pacquiao: The Movie, White Lady, Sukob, Twilight Dancers, as well as in Zsa Zsa Zaturnnah Ze Moveeh, which was an entry to that year's Metro Manila Film Festival. The following year, in 2007, de Castro played Clara in the adventure series Asian Treasures and Sari in the teen-oriented series Boys Nxt Door, afterwards starring as Emma in the Katskie Flores-directed Still Life for the Cinemalaya Philippine Independent Film Festival and co-starring with Ken Chu and Iza Calzado in the romance drama film Batanes: Sa Dulo ng Walang Hanggan.

Towards the end of the 2000s, de Castro had more starring and lead roles. In 2008, she played the lead role of Sarah Monteza in Kaputol ng Isang Awit, co-starring with Marky Cielo and Lovi Poe, and starred with Eula Valdez in the film Ang Manghuhula. After a supporting role in Gagambino (2008–2009), de Castro received the lead roles of Gladys Andrada in Kung Aagawin Mo ang Lahat sa Akin (2009) and Eunice in Stairway to Heaven (2009), the Philippine remake of the South Korean series of the same name. De Castro appeared in multiple films in 2009, which are the political thriller Bente, the Cinemalaya entry Astig, the horror film Tarot, and Mano Po 6: A Mother's Love, part of the Mano Po series and an entry to that year's Metro Manila Film Festival, where she played the young counterpart of Sharon Cuneta's character Melinda Uy.

After playing Tiffany in Diva (2010), de Castro starred in the drama fantasy television series Grazilda (2010–2011), a derivative of the Cinderella story, as the titular character. After this, she appeared as Binayaan in the epic drama series Amaya (2011–2012), starred in the rock music-themed film Rakenrol (2011) and appeared in the Cinemalaya entries I-Libings (2011) and Patikul (2011). In 2012, she starred in the musical series Biritera as Mikaela, appeared in the sitcom Tweets for My Sweet, the independent film Madaling Araw Mahabang Gabi and played Heidi Fernandez in the television series Temptation of Wife (2012–2013). Coming into the mid-2010s, de Castro appeared in the independent film Coming Soon (2013), played Vavavoom in the sitcom Vampire ang Daddy Ko from 2013 to 2016 and Gregoria de Jesús in the historical series Katipunan (2013), starred as Leah De Guzman in the independent film Cattleya: An OFW Story (2014) and co-starred with Gabby Eigenmann in the series Dading (2014).

De Castro played the lead role of Althea Guevarra in the lesbian-themed series The Rich Man's Daughter (2015) alongside Rhian Ramos and was later considered as one of the first such series in the Philippines. De Castro later starred as Gem in the QCinema Film Festival entry Sleepless (2015) before receiving another lead role the next year after being announced as the actor for Sang'gre Pirena in the 2016 edition or "requel" of the fantasy series Encantadia. De Castro won Best Actress at the Gawad Filipino Media People's Choice Awards in 2016 for her portrayal of the character, which she would subsequently reprise in the fantasy series Mulawin vs. Ravena (2017).

De Castro went on to star in the television series Contessa (2018) as Beatrice "Bea" Resureccion, later becoming Contessa as the plot progresses. This role has earned her a Best Actress in a TV Series award from the EdukCircle Awards in 2018, followed by a TV Actress of the Year (Daytime Drama) award from the Box Office Entertainment Awards and a Best Drama Actress for TV award from the Alta Media Icon Awards both in 2019; she was additionally nominated for Best Drama Actress at the 2018 PMPC Star Awards for Television. For de Castro's portrayal of Cecilia "Liway" Flores-Oebanda later in 2018 in the independent film and Cinemalaya entry Liway, directed by Kip Oebanda, she won Best Actress awards from the GEMS Hiyas ng Sining Awards under the Film category, the Luna Awards and the Platinum Stallion Media Awards and received nominations from the FAMAS Awards and the Gawad Urian Awards, all of which were granted in 2019; de Castro would further win another Best Actress award at the United States-based Facine Film Festival in 2022 for this role.

After Liway, de Castro appeared in the television series Victor Magtanggol (2018), Sahaya (2019), Prima Donnas (2019) and Beautiful Justice (2019) and the films My Letters to Happy (2019) and Midnight in a Perfect World (2020), which was an entry to that year's QCinema International Film Festival. Amidst the COVID-19 pandemic, in 2021, de Castro starred as Maita in Nagbabagang Luha, the television remake of the 1988 film of the same name, and in 2022, she starred with Xian Lim in the romantic comedy series False Positive. In 2023, de Castro starred in the film Kahel and as Eileen in the television series The Seed of Love, which revolves around in vitro fertilisation. She took on the lead role of V alongside Pokwang in the mystery thriller film Slay Zone (2024) and co-starred with Rayver Cruz, Matt Lozano, Arci Muñoz and Rhian Ramos in the music-themed Sinagtala (2025), playing the character Paola. Further into 2025, de Castro again reprised the character of Sang'gre Pirena in the Encantadia spinoff Encantadia Chronicles: Sang'gre and appeared as Jasmine Garcia in the Metro Manila Film Festival entry Bar Boys: After School, the sequel to the 2017 film Bar Boys; both films were directed by Kip Oebanda. De Castro portrayed Reynafe Castillo in the animated documentary film 58th, directed by Carl Joseph Papa, about the 2009 Maguindanao massacre, which premiered at the International Film Festival Rotterdam in 2026. Later in 2026, de Castro co-starred with Rhian Ramos in the girls' love film I Fell, It's Fine under the role of Anne and was announced to be part of the cast of the fantasy-drama film Amir, which will premiere at the year's Metro Manila Film Festival.

Besides acting, de Castro had been a regular in the variety shows SOP, Party Pilipinas, Sunday All Stars and in All-Out Sundays as of 2024, as well as a co-host of the TAPE Inc.-produced Eat Bulaga! from 2023 to 2024 when it was renamed to Tahanang Pinakamasaya and a contestant in the 2022 and 2024 editions of Running Man Philippines and the 2025 edition of Stars on the Floor.

== Film ==
Key
*	Denotes films that have not yet been released

Glaiza de Castro's film credits
Year	Title	Role	Notes	Ref(s)
2001	Cool Dudes 24/7	Madel		
2002	Singsing ni Lola	Tacion		
2005	Miss-Pinoy	—		
2006	Close to You	Lance's cousin		
2006	Manay Po!	Pauleen		
2006	Pacquiao: The Movie	Cecille		
2006	White Lady	Jowee		
2006	Sukob	Grace		
2006	Twilight Dancers	—		
2006	Zsazsa Zaturnnah Ze Moveeh	Dina B.		
2007	Still Life	Emma		
2007	Batanes: Sa Dulo ng Walang Hanggan	—		
2008	Ang Manghuhula	Claire		
2009	Bente	Rise		
2009	Astig	Elgine		
2009	Tarot	Young Lola Nena		
2009	Mano Po 6: A Mother's Love	Young Melinda	Special participation	
2011	Rakenrol	Irene		
2011	I-Libings	Isabel		
2011	Patikul	—		
2012	Madaling Araw Mahabang Gabi	—		
2013	Coming Soon	—		
2014	Cattleya: An OFW Story	Leah De Guzman		
2014	1st Ko Si 3rd	—	Special participation	
2015	Sleepless	Gem		
2016	Maria	—	Short film	
2018	Liway	Cecilia "Liway" Flores-Oebanda		
2019	My Letters to Happy	Happy		
2020	Midnight In A Perfect World	Jinka Trajano		
2023	Kahel	—		
2024	Slay Zone	V		
2025	Sinagtala	Paola	Main role	
2025	Bar Boys: After School	Jasmine Garcia		
2026	58th	Reynafe Castillo	Main role	
2026	I Fell, It's Fine	Anne	Main role	
2026	Amir*	—	Main role	

== Television ==
Glaiza de Castro's television credits
Year	Title	Role	Ref(s)
2001	Kasangga	—	
2001	Ikaw Lang ang Mamahalin	—	
2002–2004	Berks	—	
2004	Sarah the Teen Princess	—	
2004–2005	Spirits	—	
2005	Ikaw ang Lahat sa Akin	—	
2005–2006	Maalaala Mo Kaya	Various roles	
2006	Fantastikids	—	
2007	Asian Treasures	Clara	
2007	Mga Kuwento ni Lola Basyang: Akong Ikit	Prinsesa Zelma	
2007–2008	Boys Nxt Door	Sari	
2008	Sine Novela: Kaputol ng Isang Awit	Sarah Monteza	
2008–2009	Carlo J. Caparas' Gagambino	Leah	
2009	Sine Novela: Kung Aagawin Mo ang Lahat sa Akin	Gladys Andrada	
2009	SRO Cinemaserye: The Eva Castillo Story	Young Eva Castillo	
2009	Stairway to Heaven	Eunice	
2010	SOP	Herself	
2010	Laf En Rol	Herself	
2010	Diva	Tiffany	
2010–2013	Party Pilipinas	Herself	
2010–2011	Grazilda	Grazilda	
2011–2012	Amaya	Binayaan	
2012	Biritera	Mikaela	
2012	Tweets for My Sweet	—	
2012–2013	Temptation of Wife	Heidi Fernandez	
2013–2016	Vampire ang Daddy Ko	Vavavoom	
2013	Magpakailanman: The Susan Fuentes Story	Susan Fuentes	
2013; 2015	Wagas	Various roles	
2013	Magpakailanman: The Glaiza de Castro Story	Herself	
2013–2015	Sunday All Stars	Herself	
2013	Katipunan	Gregoria de Jesús	
2014	Magpakailanman: Kambal na Lihim	Aleli / Ayani	
2014	Rhodora X	—	
2014	Magpakailanman: Magkasalo sa Pugad	Francia	
2014	Dading	Beth	
2014	Elemento: Si Esperanza, ang Rebeldeng Manananggal	Esperanza	
2014	Magpakailanman: Ang Babaeng Ama: The Mark Marzo Story	—	
2015	The Rich Man's Daughter	Althea Guevarra	
2015	Alamat: Ang Unang Bahaghari	Voice of Liwliwa	
2015	Magpakailanman	Donna	
2016–2017	Encantadia	Sang'gre Pirena	
2017	Daig Kayo ng Lola Ko: Red Mildred and the Wolf	Red Mildred	
2017	Mulawin vs. Ravena	Sang'gre Pirena	
2018	Contessa	Beatrice "Bea" Resureccion / Contessa	
2018	Victor Magtanggol	—	
2019	Sahaya	Teacher Toni	
2019	Magpakailanman	Matet Craig	
2019	Prima Donnas	Maita Claveria	
2019	Beautiful Justice	Roxy	
2020–2024	All-Out Sundays	Herself	
2021	Nagbabagang Luha	Maita	
2022	Tadhana: The Wedding	Mariel	
2022	False Positive	Yannie Dela Guardia	
2022	First Lady	—	
2022	Daig Kayo ng Lola Ko: Bida Kontrabida	—	
2022; 2024	Running Man Philippines	Herself	
2023	Daig Kayo ng Lola Ko: InvisiBelle	Belle	
2023	The Seed of Love	Eileen	
2023–2024	Eat Bulaga!	Herself	
2023	Magpakailanman: Voice of Love: The Lani and Noli Misalucha Love Story	Lani Misalucha	
2024	Tahanang Pinakamasaya!	Herself	
2025–2026	Encantadia Chronicles: Sang'gre	Sang'gre Pirena / Hara Pirena	
2025	Stars on the Floor	Herself	
2026	Tadhana: My Husband's Wedding	Grace	
