= List of awards and nominations received by Glaiza de Castro =

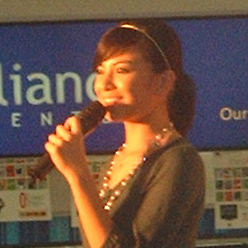
De Castro at a Regal Entertainment event at SM City Valenzuela in 2006

Filipino actress and singer Glaiza de Castro has received various awards and nominations for her film, television and music works. Her acting career began in 2001 with appearances in the television series Kasangga and the film Cool Dudes 24/7, and her career in music began the same year with the release of her first album, Magbalik Ka, under XAX Music Entertainment.

Her portrayal of Emma in the 2007 film Still Life, as her first Cinemalaya appearance, resulted in nominations for Best Performance by an Actress in a Leading Role (Drama) at the ENPRESS Golden Screen Awards and for Best Actress at the Gawad Urian Awards in 2008. De Castro was nominated by the same organisation two years later for Best Supporting Actress for her appearance in another Cinemalaya entry, Astig (2009), and ENPRESS would later nominate her in 2014 for Outstanding Supporting Actress in a Drama Program for her role of Heidi Fernandez in the television series Temptation of Wife (2012–2013). In 2016, de Castro was recognised as Teleserye Actress of the Year by the entertainment website Philippine Entertainment Portal for her role as Althea Guevarra in the 2015 lesbian-themed series The Rich Man's Daughter and won a Best Actress award from the Gawad Filipino Media People's Choice Awards for her portrayal of Sang'gre Pirena in the 2016 edition of the fantasy series Encantadia.

In 2018, for her portrayal of Beatrice "Bea" Resureccion or Contessa in the television series Contessa, de Castro was awarded Best Actress in a TV Series by the EdukCircle Awards and nominated for Best Drama Actress by the PMPC Star Awards for Television within the same year, and in 2019 was awarded Best Drama Actress for TV at the Alta Media Icon Awards and TV Actress of the Year (Daytime Drama) at the Box Office Entertainment Awards. Also in 2018, de Castro starred as Cecilia "Liway" Flores-Oebanda in the Cinemalaya entry Liway, which was directed by Kip Oebanda. This role has garnered her four awards for Best Actress, three in 2019 and one in 2022, which came from the GEMS Hiyas ng Sining Awards, the Luna Awards, the Platinum Stallion Media Awards and the Facine Film Festival; she has also received two nominations for the same category, both in 2019, from the FAMAS Awards and the Gawad Urian Awards. Five years later, in 2024, de Castro won Best Actress at the World Class Excellence Japan Awards after portraying Eileen in the series The Seed of Love (2023).

For her acting work as a whole, in 2017, de Castro was recognised by the city government of Valenzuela in Metro Manila, and in 2026, she was awarded Woman of Excellence in Acting by the Gawad Pilipino Babae Ka Awards. Outside of acting, she was awarded Female Rock Artist of the Year at the 7th PMPC Star Awards for Music for her album Synthesis (2015), which had been certified gold by the Philippine Association of the Record Industry (PARI), while a track from the album, "Dusk 'Til Dawn", was nominated for Best Rock/Alternative Recording at the 2016 Awit Awards. A song from her succeeding album Magandang Simulain (2017), "Sinta", would earn her a nomination for Female Recording Artist of the year at the 10th PMPC Star Awards for Music held in 2018.

== Awards and nominations ==
Awards and nominations received by Glaiza de Castro
| Organisation | Year | Recipient(s) and nominee(s) | Category | Result | Ref(s) |
|---|---|---|---|---|---|
| Alta Media Icon Awards | 2019 | Contessa | Best Drama Actress for TV | Won | |
| Awit Awards | 2016 | "Dusk 'Til Dawn" | Best Rock/Alternative Recording | Nominated | |
| Box Office Entertainment Awards | 2019 | Contessa | TV Actress of the Year (Daytime Drama) | Won | |
| EdukCircle Awards | 2018 | Contessa | Best Actress in a TV Series | Won | |
| ENPRESS Golden Screen Awards | 2008 | Still Life | Best Performance by an Actress in a Leading Role (Drama) | Nominated | |
| ENPRESS Golden Screen TV Awards | 2014 | Temptation of Wife | Outstanding Supporting Actress in a Drama Program | Nominated | |
| Facine Film Festival | 2022 | Liway | Best Actress | Won | |
| FAMAS Awards | 2019 | Liway | Best Actress | Nominated | |
| Gawad Dr. Pio Valenzuela | 2017 | Glaiza de Castro | Pagkilala sa Ambag sa Sining ng Pagganap | Won | |
| Gawad Filipino Media People's Choice Awards | 2016 | Encantadia | Best Actress | Won | |
| Gawad Pilipino Babae Ka Awards | 2026 | Glaiza de Castro | Woman of Excellence in Acting | Won | |
| Gawad Urian Awards | 2008 | Still Life | Best Actress | Nominated | |
| Gawad Urian Awards | 2010 | Astig | Best Supporting Actress | Nominated | |
| Gawad Urian Awards | 2019 | Liway | Best Actress | Nominated | |
| GEMS Hiyas ng Sining Awards | 2019 | Liway | Best Actress (Film) | Won | |
| Luna Awards | 2019 | Liway | Best Actress | Won | |
| Philippine Entertainment Portal | 2016 | The Rich Man's Daughter | Teleserye Actress of the Year | Won | |
| Platinum Stallion Media Awards | 2019 | Liway | Best Actress | Won | |
| PMPC Star Awards for Music | 2015 | Synthesis | Female Rock Artist of the Year | Won | |
| PMPC Star Awards for Music | 2018 | "Sinta" | Female Recording Artist of the Year | Nominated | |
| PMPC Star Awards for Television | 2018 | Contessa | Best Drama Actress | Nominated | |
| World Class Excellence Japan Awards | 2024 | The Seed of Love | Best Actress | Won | |
