= List of Contessa episodes =

Contessa (transl. Countess) is a 2018 Philippine revenge drama television series directed by Albert Langitan, starring Glaiza de Castro in the title role. The series premiered on GMA Network's GMA Afternoon Prime and Sabado Star Power sa Hapon block and worldwide on GMA Pinoy TV from March 19 to September 8, 2018, succeeding the 1-year run of Ika-6 na Utos.

NUTAM (Nationwide Urban Television Audience Measurement) People in Television Homes ratings are provided by AGB Nielsen Philippines. The series ended, but its the 24th-week run, and with 147 episodes. It was replaced by Ika-5 Utos.

== Series overview ==
Season	Episodes	Originally released	
Season	Episodes	First released	Last released
1	147	March 19, 2018	September 8, 2018

== Episodes ==
No.	Episode	Original air date	Social media hashtag	AGB Nielsen NUTAM People in Television Homes			Prod. Code	Ref.
No.	Episode	Original air date	Social media hashtag	Ratings	Timeslot rank	Whole day rank	Prod. Code	Ref.
1	"Pilot"	March 19, 2018	#Contessa	5.2%	#2		1001 - A	
2	"A Second Chance"	March 20, 2018	#ContessaASecondChance				1002 - B	
3	"I Do and Die"	March 21, 2018	#ContessaIDoAndDie				1004 - D	
4	"Suspect"	March 22, 2018	#ContessaSuspect				1003 - C	
5	"Bea vs. Daniella"	March 23, 2018	#ContessaBeaVsDaniella	5.2%	#2	#13	1005 - E	
6	"Paalam Marco" (Goodbye Marco)	March 24, 2018	#ContessaPaalamMarco	5.5%	#2	#12	1006 - F	
7	"Tulong ni Gabriel" (Gabriel's Help)	March 26, 2018	#ContessaTulongNiGabriel	5.7%	#1	#12	1007 - G	
8	"Bintang" (Imputation)	March 27, 2018	#ContessaBintang	5.9%	#2	#14	1008 - H	
9	"Resbak" (Fights Back)	March 28, 2018	#ContessaResbak	6.7%	#1		1010 - J	
Average								

=== April 2018 ===
No.	Episode	Original air date	Social media hashtag	AGB Nielsen NUTAM People in Television Homes			Prod. Code	Ref.
No.	Episode	Original air date	Social media hashtag	Ratings	Timeslot rank	Whole day rank	Prod. Code	Ref.
10	"Panganib" (Danger)	April 2, 2018	#ContessaPanganib		#2		1009 - I	
11	"Para sa Anak" (For Her Daughter)	April 3, 2018	#ContessaParaSaAnak		#2		1011 - K	
12	"Sumpa ni Bea" (Bea's Curse)	April 4, 2018	#ContessaSumpaNiBea		#2		1012 - L	
13	"Hiling ni Bea" (Bea's Request)	April 5, 2018	#ContessaHilingNiBea		#2		1013 - M	
14	"The Funeral"	April 6, 2018	#ContessaTheFuneral		#2		1014 - N	
15	"Ang Paghahatol" (The Judgement)	April 7, 2018	#ContessaAngPaghahatol		#2		1015 - O	
16	"Sino si Guada?" (Who is Guada?)	April 9, 2018	#ContessaSinoSiGuada		#2		1016 - P	
17	"Anak ni Bea" (Bea's Baby)	April 10, 2018	#ContessaAnakNiBea		#2		1017 - Q	
18	"Witness"	April 11, 2018	#ContessaWitness		#2		1018 - R	
19	"Danger"	April 12, 2018	#ContessaDanger	7.3%	#1		1019 - S	
20	"Laban Bea" (Fight, Bea)	April 13, 2018	#ContessaLabanBea		#2		1021 - U	
21	"Oras Na" (It's Time)	April 14, 2018	#ContessaOrasNa		#2		1022 - V	
22	"Vito vs. Bea"	April 16, 2018	#ContessaVitoVsBea		#2		1020 - T	
23	"Road to Revenge"	April 17, 2018	#ContessaRoadToRevenge	7.1%	#1		1023 - W	
24	"Bagong Simula" (New Beginning)	April 18, 2018	#ContessaBagongSimula	6.9%	#1		1024 - X	
25	"Unang Pasabog" (First Explosion)	April 19, 2018	#ContessaUnangPasabog	7.9%	#1		1026 - Z	
26	"Patikim kay Daniella" (Take this Daniella)	April 20, 2018	#ContessaPatikimKayDaniella	8.1%	#1		1027 - AA	
27	"Prepare for Contessa"	April 21, 2018	#PrepareForContessa	8.9%	#1		1028 - BB	
28	"Pagdududa" (Doubt)	April 23, 2018	#ContessaPagdududa	7.0%	#1		1025 - Y	
29	"Contessa Meets Ely"	April 24, 2018	#ContessaMeetsEly	7.8%	#1		1029 - CC	
30	"Contessa Targets Gabriel"	April 25, 2018	#ContessaTargetsGabriel	7.2%	#1		1030 - DD	
31	"Daniella's Gift"	April 26, 2018	#ContessaDaniellasGift	7.7%	#1		1032 - FF	
32	"Hinala ni Jong" (Jong's Suspicion)	April 27, 2018	#ContessaHinalaNiJong	7.5%	#1		1033 - GG	
33	"Bagong Kakampi" (New Ally)	April 28, 2018	#ContessaBagongKakampi	7.4%	#1		1031 - EE	
34	"Contessa in Danger"	April 30, 2018	#ContessaInDanger	6.7%	#1		1034 - HH	
Average								

=== May 2018 ===
No.	Episode	Original air date	Social media hashtag	AGB Nielsen NUTAM People in Television Homes			Prod. Code	Ref.
No.	Episode	Original air date	Social media hashtag	Ratings	Timeslot rank	Whole day rank	Prod. Code	Ref.
35	"The Confession"	May 1, 2018	#ContessaTheConfession	8.0%	#1		1035 - II	
36	"Pag-ibig ni Jong" (Jong's Love)	May 2, 2018	#ContessaPagIbigNiJong	7.4%	#1		1036 - JJ	
37	"Truth Hurts"	May 3, 2018	#ContessaTruthHurts	7.2%	#1		1037 - KK	
38	"Fight for Love"	May 4, 2018	#ContessaFightForLove	7.4%	#1		1038 - LL	
39	"Sagabal" (Hitch)	May 5, 2018	#ContessaSagabal	7.2%	#1		1039 - MM	
40	"Daniella's Training"	May 7, 2018	#ContessaDaniellasTraining	7.3%	#1		1040 - NN	
41	"The Kiss"	May 8, 2018	#ContessaTheKiss	7.6%	#1		1042 - PP	
42	"Charito vs. Queen V"	May 9, 2018	#ContessaCharitoVsQueenV	8.1%	#1		1043 - QQ	
43	"Galit ni Vito" (Vito's Anger)	May 10, 2018	#ContessaGalitNiVito	7.8%	#1		1041 - OO	
44	"Palabang Queen V" (Tough Queen V)	May 11, 2018	#ContessaPalabangQueenV	7.1%	#1		1044 - RR	
45	"The Decision"	May 12, 2018	#ContessaTheDecision	7.0%	#1		1045 - SS	
46	"Alaala ng Ina" (A Mother's Memory)	May 14, 2018	#ContessaAlaalaNgIna				1046 - TT	
47	"Ely in Danger"	May 15, 2018	#ContessaElyInDanger				1047 - UU	
48	"Search for Ely"	May 16, 2018	#ContessaSearchForEly	7.1%	#1		1048 - VV	
49	"Pagmamakaawa" (Supplication)	May 17, 2018	#ContessaPagmamakaawa	6.9%	#1		1051 - YY	
50	"Rescue Ely"	May 18, 2018	#ContessaRescueEly				1049 - WW	
51	"Para sa Kapatid" (For Her Brother)	May 19, 2018	#ContessaParaSaKapatid				1050 - XX	
52	"Hagupit ni Contessa" (Contessa's Anger)	May 21, 2018	#HagupitNiContessa	7.6%	#1		1052 - ZZ	
53	"Parusa kay Vito" (Vito's Punishment)	May 22, 2018	#ContessaParusaKayVito	6.7%	#2	#7	1054 - BBB	
54	"Destroy Daniella"	May 23, 2018	#ContessaDestroyDaniella				1053 - AAA	
55	"Hinanakit" (Resentment)	May 24, 2018	#ContessaHinanakit				1055 - CCC	
56	"Pagbaligtad" (Reversal)	May 25, 2018	#ContessaPagbaligtad				1056 - DDD	
57	"The Fake Drama"	May 26, 2018	#ContessaTheFakeDrama				1057 - EEE	
58	"Plano ni Gabriel" (Gabriel's Plan)	May 28, 2018	#ContessaPlanoNiGabriel				1058 - FFF	
59	"The Proposal"	May 29, 2018	#ContessaTheProposal				1059 - GGG	
60	"Daniella's Fiance"	May 30, 2018	#ContessaDaniellasFiance				1061 - III	
61	"Bride Wars"	May 31, 2018	#ContessaBrideWars				1060 - HHH	
Average								

=== June 2018 ===
No.	Episode	Original air date	Social media hashtag	AGB Nielsen NUTAM People in Television Homes			Prod. Code	Ref.
No.	Episode	Original air date	Social media hashtag	Ratings	Timeslot rank	Whole day rank	Prod. Code	Ref.
62	"Ang Motibo" (The Motive)	June 1, 2018	#ContessaAngMotibo				1062 - JJJ	
63	"The Evidence"	June 2, 2018	#ContessaTheEvidence				1063 - KKK	
64	"Pagsubok" (Trial)	June 4, 2018	#ContessaPagsubok				1064 - LLL	
65	"The Sabotage"	June 5, 2018	#ContessaTheSabotage	6.0%	#1		1066 - NNN	
66	"Pagdududa" (Doubt)	June 6, 2018	#ContessaPagdududa				1067 - OOO	
67	"Hiwalayan" (Separation)	June 7, 2018	#ContessaHiwalayan	6.3%	#1		1068 - PPP	
68	"Bagong Alas" (New Ace)	June 8, 2018	#ContessaBagongAlas	6.4%	#1		1065 - MMM	
69	"Banta ni Contessa" (Contessa's Threat)	June 9, 2018	#BantaNiContessa	8.2%	#1		1069 - QQQ	
70	"Trouble"	June 11, 2018	#ContessaTrouble	7.3%	#1		1070 - RRR	
71	"Ebidensya" (Evidence)	June 12, 2018	#ContessaEbidensya	8.3%	#1		1071 - SSS	
72	"Pagbagsak" (Falling)	June 13, 2018	#ContessaPagbagsak	7.1%	#1		1072 - TTT	
73	"Hulog" (Fall)	June 14, 2018	#ContessaHulog	7.8%	#1		1074 - VVV	
74	"Kuyog" (Horde)	June 15, 2018	#ContessaKuyog	8.1%	#1		1075 - WWW	
75	"Pagbabanta" (Threat)	June 16, 2018	#ContessaPagbabanta				1073 - UUU	
76	"Misteryoso" (Mysterious)	June 18, 2018	#ContessaMisteryoso	6.1%	#1		1076 - XXX	
77	"Contessa Meets Duquessa"	June 19, 2018	#ContessaMeetsDuquessa				1077 - YYY	
78	"Royal Harapan" (Royal Facade)	June 20, 2018	#ContessaRoyalHarapan				1078 - ZZZ	
79	"Tik Tok"	June 21, 2018	#ContessaTikTok				1079 - a	
80	"Hostage"	June 22, 2018	#ContessaHostage				1081 - c	
81	"Bingit" (Brink)	June 23, 2018	#ContessaBingit				1082 - d	
82	"Contessa vs. Duquessa"	June 25, 2018	#ContessaVsDuquessa	7.0%	#1		1080 - b	
83	"The Switch"	June 26, 2018	#ContessaTheSwitch	6.3%	#1		1083 - e	
84	"Survival"	June 27, 2018	#ContessaSurvival	6.1%	#1		1084 - f	
85	"Falling Empire"	June 28, 2018	#ContessaFallingEmpire	6.1%	#1		1085 - g	
86	"Contessa Meets Perfida"	June 29, 2018	#ContessaMeetsPerfida	6.9%	#1		1086 - h	
87	"The Fall Guy"	June 30, 2018	#ContessaTheFallGuy	7.9%	#1		1087 - i	
Average								

=== July 2018 ===
No.	Episode	Original air date	Social media hashtag	AGB Nielsen NUTAM People in Television Homes			Prod. Code	Ref.
No.	Episode	Original air date	Social media hashtag	Ratings	Timeslot rank	Whole day rank	Prod. Code	Ref.
88	"Lihim ni Perfida" (Perfida's Secret)	July 2, 2018	#ContessaLihimNiPerfida	5.6%	#1		1088 - j	
89	"Game Plan"	July 3, 2018	#ContessaGamePlan	5.7%	#1		1089 - k	
90	"Paniningil" (Payback)	July 4, 2018	#ContessaPaniningil	6.6%	#1		1091 - m	
91	"Bea is Back"	July 5, 2018	#ContessaBeaIsBack	6.4%	#1		1090 - l	
92	"Katotohanan" (Truth)	July 6, 2018	#ContessaKatotohanan	6.9%	#1		1092 - n	
93	"Back in Jail"	July 7, 2018	#ContessaBackInJail	8.4%	#1		1093 - o	
94	"Hustisya" (Justice)	July 9, 2018	#ContessaHustisya	6.9%	#1		1094 - p	
95	"Eskapo" (Escape)	July 10, 2018	#ContessaEskapo	6.0%	#1		1095 - q	
96	"Paalam" (Farewell)	July 11, 2018	#ContessaPaalam	6.7%	#1		1097 - s	
97	"Pagpapalayas" (Getting Out)	July 12, 2018	#ContessaPagpapalayas	7.2%	#1		1098 - t	
98	"Taste of Revenge"	July 13, 2018	#ContessaTasteOfRevenge	6.9%	#1		1096 - r	
99	"Imperials Downfall"	July 14, 2018	#ContessaImperialsDownfall	8.2%	#1		1099 - u	
100	"Revenge is Over"	July 16, 2018	#ContessaRevengeIsOver	6.9%	#1		1100 - v	
101	"Walang Katapusan" (Endless)	July 17, 2018	#ContessaWalangKatapusan	7.8%	#1		1101 - w	
102	"Get Even"	July 18, 2018	#ContessaGetEven	7.9%	#1		1102 - x	
103	"Contessa vs. Guada"	July 19, 2018	#ContessaVsGuada	6.0%	#1		1103 - y	
104	"Kapit sa Patalim" (Fitted with a Knife)	July 20, 2018	#ContessaKapitSaPatalim	7.0%	#1		1104 - z	
105	"Hindi Susuko" (Not Giving Up)	July 21, 2018	#ContessaHindiSusuko	7.2%	#1		1107 - cc	
106	"Walang Ligtas" (Unsafe)	July 23, 2018	#ContessaWalangLigtas	7.0%	#1		1105 - aa	
107	"Hulihin si Guada" (Capture Guada)	July 24, 2018	#ContessaHulihinSiGuada	5.9%	#1		1106 - bb	
108	"Sakripisyo" (Sacrifice)	July 25, 2018	#ContessaSakripisyo	5.9%	#1		1108 - dd	
109	"Chasing Contessa"	July 26, 2018	#ChasingContessa	5.8%	#1		1109 - ee	
110	"Vito is Back"	July 27, 2018	#ContessaVitoIsBack	6.8%	#1		1110 - ff	
111	"Wedding Explosion"	July 28, 2018	#ContessaWeddingExplosion	7.0%	#1		1111 - gg	
112	"Dark Plan"	July 30, 2018	#ContessaDarkPlan	5.3%	#1	#13	1112 - hh	
113	"Bloody Despedida" (Bloody Farewell)	July 31, 2018	#ContessaBloodyDespedida	6.3%	#1		1113 - ii	
Average								

=== August 2018 ===
No.	Episode	Original air date	Social media hashtag	AGB Nielsen NUTAM People in Television Homes			Prod. Code	Ref.
No.	Episode	Original air date	Social media hashtag	Ratings	Timeslot rank	Whole day rank	Prod. Code	Ref.
114	"Survivor"	August 1, 2018	#ContessaSurvivor	5.7%	#1		1114 - jj	
115	"The Big Lie"	August 2, 2018	#ContessaTheBigLie	6.0%	#1		1115 - kk	
116	"Prisoner of Love"	August 3, 2018	#ContessaPrisonerOfLove	6.4%	#1		1116 - ll	
117	"Target Contessa"	August 4, 2018	#TargetContessa	6.9%	#1		1117 - mm	
118	"Pagluluksa" (Mourning)	August 6, 2018	#ContessaPagluluksa	5.4%	#1		1118 - nn	
119	"Tuloy ang Laban" (The Battle Continues)	August 7, 2018	#ContessaTuloyAngLaban	5.8%	#1		1120 - pp	
120	"New Target"	August 8, 2018	#ContessaNewTarget	6.2%	#1		1119 - oo	
121	"Team Perfida"	August 9, 2018	#ContessaTeamPerfida	6.9%	#1		1121 - qq	
122	"Pagbabalik" (Comeback)	August 10, 2018	#ContessaPagbabalik	6.8%	#1		1122 - rr	
123	"Lihim ni Eric" (Eric's Secret)	August 11, 2018	#ContessaLihimNiEric	7.6%	#1		1123 - ss	
124	"Chase"	August 13, 2018	#ContessaChase	6.7%	#1		1124 - tt	
125	"Contessa Sees Gabriel"	August 14, 2018	#ContessaSeesGabriel	6.6%	#1		1126 - vv	
126	"Sabwatan" (Conspiracy)	August 15, 2018	#ContessaSabwatan	5.9%	#1		1127 - ww	
127	"Muling Pagkikita" (Meeting Again)	August 16, 2018	#ContessaMulingPagkikita	6.1%	#1		1125 - uu	
128	"Painful Truth"	August 17, 2018	#ContessaPainfulTruth	6.5%	#1		1128 - xx	
129	"Saving Perfida"	August 18, 2018	#ContessaSavingPerfida	6.6%	#1		1129 - yy	
130	"It's Over"	August 20, 2018	#ContessaItsOver	6.5%	#1		1130 - zz	
131	"Saltik ni Eric" (Eric's Insanity)	August 21, 2018	#ContessaSaltikNiEric	7.1%	#1	#13	1131 - aaa	
132	"The Truth"	August 22, 2018	#ContessaTheTruth	5.7%	#1	#15	1132 - bbb	
133	"Bistado" (Seen)	August 23, 2018	#ContessaBistado	5.9%	#1	#15	1133 - ccc	
134	"Contessa Finds Jong"	August 24, 2018	#ContessaFindsJong	6.4%	#1	#11	1134 - ddd	
135	"Secret Plan"	August 25, 2018	#ContessaSecretPlan	6.9%	#1	#9	1135 - eee	
136	"Reunited"	August 27, 2018	#ContessaReunited	7.0%	#1	#12	1136 - fff	
137	"Evil Bride"	August 28, 2018	#ContessaEvilBride	6.5%	#1	#13	1138 - hhh	
138	"Fake Truth"	August 29, 2018	#ContessaFakeTruth	6.7%	#1	#12	1139 - iii	
139	"Payback Time"	August 30, 2018	#ContessaPaybackTime	7.0%	#1	#12	1137 - ggg	
140	"Hagupit ni Guada" (Guada's Anger)	August 31, 2018	#ContessaHagupitNiGuada	7.0%	#1	#13	1140 - jjj	
Average								

=== September 2018 ===
No.	Episode	Original air date	Social media hashtag	AGB Nielsen NUTAM People in Television Homes			Prod. Code	Ref.
No.	Episode	Original air date	Social media hashtag	Ratings	Timeslot rank	Whole day rank	Prod. Code	Ref.
141	"Habilin ng Ina" (Mother's Will)	September 1, 2018	#ContessaHabilinNgIna	6.4%	#1		1141 - kkk	
142	"Fight for Guada"	September 3, 2018	#ContessaFightForGuada	6.5%	#1	#13	1142 - lll	
143	"The Grief"	September 4, 2018	#ContessaTheGrief	6.4%	#1		1143 - mmm	
144	"Matira Matibay" (Survival of the Fittest)	September 5, 2018	#ContessaMatiraMatibay	6.2%	#1		1144 - nnn	
145	"Buhay sa Buhay" (Life for Life)	September 6, 2018	#ContessaBuhaySaBuhay	6.7%	#1		1145 - ooo	
146	"Undying Revenge"	September 7, 2018	#ContessaUndyingRevenge	6.6%	#1		1146 - ppp	
147	"Ang Huling Pagbawi" (The Last Recovery)	September 8, 2018	#ContessaAngHulingPagbawi	6.8%	#1		1147 - qqq	
Average								
