= Dominic Roco =

Filipino television personality

- Born: Ricardo Dominic Artadi Roco; April 12, 1989 (age 37); Cebu, Philippines
- Occupation: Actor
- Years active: 2004–present
- Parent: Bembol Roco (father)
- Family: Felix Roco (brother)

Ricardo Dominic Artadi Roco (born April 12, 1989) is a Filipino actor.

== Personal life ==
Roco is a son of actor Bembol Roco and the twin brother of actor Felix Roco.

On October 1, 2022, Roco and four other persons were arrested in a buy-bust operation in Quezon City. His last television series was False Positive in GMA Network before he was arrested. Roco later returned to acting in ABS-CBN in the action-comedy drama series, FPJ's Batang Quiapo.

== Filmography ==
=== Film ===
Year	Title	Role
2004	Otso-Otso Pamela-Mela Wan	Mocky Cabangon
2009	Love on Line (LOL)	
2009	Shake, Rattle & Roll XI	Pong
2011	Dagaw	
2012	Ang Nawawala (What Isn't There)	Gibson Bonifacio
2013	Coming Soon	Darwin
2015	Sleepless	Barry
2017	I'm Drunk, I Love You	Jason Ty
2018	Liway	Ric / Commander Toto

=== Television ===
Year	Title	Role	Notes
2005	Qpids	Himself / Contestant	
2006–2007	Super Inggo	JP	
2006	Maynila: Heart Beat	Sam	
2006	Fantastikids	Bogz	
2007	Super Twins	Ian	
2007	Carlo J. Caparas' Kamandag	Pigo	
2008	Daisy Siete: Tinderella	Juan Raphael	
2009	Zorro	Daniel	
2009	Mars Ravelo's Darna	Hector	
2010	Sine Novela: Basahang Ginto	Aries	
2010	Grazilda	Vicente	
2011	Sisid	Siegfried Zaragoza	
2012	Legacy	Young Lucio	
2012	Broken Vow	Wilson Ocampo	
2012	Makapiling Kang Muli	Wesley Perez	
2013	Indio	Tuhay	
2013	Magkano Ba ang Pag-ibig?	Bobby Buenaventura	
2013	Katipunan	Pacquing	
2014	Ang Dalawang Mrs. Real	Daniel "Dado" Salazar	
2015	Healing Hearts	Stephen	
2015	Magpakailanman: Under1Roof	Rolly	
2015	Magpakailanman: SiyangNagingAkin	Jonathan	
2016	Juan Happy Love Story	Henry Agustin	
2017	Destined to be Yours	Jason	
2017	Wish Ko Lang: Mag-ina	Arnel	
2017	Imbestigador: Dormitoryo	Joshua Dale Perez	
2018	Contessa	Oliver Sta. Ana	
2018	My Special Tatay	Peter Ocampo	
2019	Dahil sa Pag-ibig	Roger	
2021	Ang Dalawang Ikaw	Greg Perez	
2022	False Positive	Froilan Siodora	
2023	FPJ's Batang Quiapo	young Augustus	
2024	Family Feud Philippines	Himself / Guest	
