= Sinagtala =

2025 Filipino musical drama film

- Theatrical release poster
- Directed by: Mike E. Sandejas
- Written by: Mike E. Sandejas
- Produced by: Rose Conde; Mavic Tagbo
- Starring: Glaiza de Castro; Rhian Ramos; Rayver Cruz; Arci Muñoz; Matt Lozano
- Cinematography: Dom Dycaico
- Edited by: Mikael Angelo Pestaño
- Music by: Francis Reyes
- Production company: Sinagtala Productions
- Distributed by: GMA Pictures
- Release date: 2 April 2025
- Country: Philippines
- Language: Filipino

Sinagtala is a 2025 Philippine musical drama film written and directed by Mike E. Sandejas. It stars Glaiza de Castro, Rhian Ramos, Rayver Cruz, Arci Muñoz and Matt Lozano. It was released on Philippine cinema on April 2, 2025

== Synopsis ==
Sinagtala is a formerly successful local band whose members drift apart as personal difficulties and unfulfilled ambitions affect the group. Despite following separate paths, they remain connected by their shared history and unresolved regrets. Paola, the band’s leader, remains central to the members’ relationship and their connection to music.

- Glaiza de Castro as Paola
- Rhian Ramos as June
- Rayver Cruz as Reggie
- Arci Muñoz as Carla
- Matt Lozano as Isko
- Benjie Paras
- Ricky Davao

== Release ==
The film was released on April 2, 2025, under the Sinagtala Productions.
