= List of The Rich Man's Daughter episodes =

The Rich Man's Daughter is a 2015 Philippine television drama romantic series broadcast by GMA Network. It premiered on the network's Telebabad line up and worldwide via GMA Pinoy TV from May 11, 2015 to August 7, 2015, replacing Second Chances.

Mega Manila ratings are provided by AGB Nielsen Philippines.

== Series overview ==
Month	Episodes	Monthly Averages
Month	Episodes	Mega Manila
May 2015	15	17.2%
June 2015	22	15.6%
July 2015	23	15.7%
August 2015	5	17.8%
Total	65	16.6%

== Episodes ==
=== May 2015 ===
Episode		Original air date	Social Media Hashtag	AGB Nielsen Mega Manila Households in Television Homes			Ref.
Episode		Original air date	Social Media Hashtag	Rating	Timeslot Rank	Primetime Rank	Ref.
1	Pilot	May 11, 2015	#TheRichMansDaughter	20.7%	#1	#3	
2	Sparks	May 12, 2015	#TRMDSparks	18.3%	#1	#6	
3	Dilemma	May 13, 2015	#TRMDDilemma	17.6%	#1	#6	
4	Confession	May 14, 2015	#TRMDConfession	18.2%	#1	#5	
5	Complicated	May 15, 2015	#TRMDComplicated	15.8%	#2	#7	
6	Runaway	May 18, 2015	#TRMDRunaway	17.4%	#1	#6	
7	Pressure	May 19, 2015	#TRMDPressure	18.3%	#1	#4	
8	Truth	May 20, 2015	#TRMDTruth	16.9%	#1	#6	
9	Hurt	May 21, 2015	#TRMDHurt	16.3%	#2	#7	
10	Courage	May 22, 2015	#TRMDCourage	16.4%	#1	#6	
11	Rival	May 25, 2015	#TRMDRival	16.1%	#1	#7	
12	Call Off	May 26, 2015	#TRMDCallOff	16.7%	#1	#5	
13	Goodbye	May 27, 2015	#TRMDGoodbye	17.8%	#1	#5	
14	Suicide	May 28, 2015	#TRMDSuicide	16.8%	#1	#5	
15	Caught	May 29, 2015	#TRMDCaught	15.1%	#2	#7	

=== June 2015 ===
Episode		Original air date	Social Media Hashtag	AGB Nielsen Mega Manila Households in Television Homes			Ref.
Episode		Original air date	Social Media Hashtag	Rating	Timeslot Rank	Primetime Rank	Ref.
16	Promise	June 1, 2015	#TRMDPromise	16.2%	#2	#7	
17	Exclusive	June 2, 2015	#TRMDExclusive	17.5%	#2	#6	
18	Request	June 3, 2015	#TRMDRequest	15.7%	#1	#7	
19	Scandal	June 4, 2015	#TRMDScandal	15.2%	#2	#8	
20	Choice	June 5, 2015	#TRMDChoice	16.9%	#1	#6	
21	Trials	June 8, 2015	#TRMDTrials	15.7%	#1	#7	
22	Revenge	June 9, 2015	#TRMDRevenge	15.4%	#2	#7	
23	Rescue	June 10, 2015	#TRMDRescue	15.1%	#2	#8	
24	Rejection	June 11, 2015	#TRMDRejection	15.7%	#2	#6	
25	100 Million	June 12, 2015	#TRMD100M	15.4%	#2	#7	
26	Visit	June 15, 2015	#TRMDVisit	14.9%	#2	#8	
27	Past	June 16, 2015	#TRMDPast	15.1%	#2	#8	
28	Plan	June 17, 2015	#TRMDPlan	15.5%	#2	#7	
29	Chaos	June 18, 2015	#TRMDChaos	14.5%	#2	#7	
30	Broken	June 19, 2015	#TRMDBroken	15.9%	#2	#8	
31	Danger	June 22, 2015	#TRMDDanger	14.8%	#2	#8	
32	Restart	June 23, 2015	#TRMDRestart	14.5%	#2	#8	
33	Guilt	June 24, 2015	#TRMDGuilt	14.1%	#2	#8	
34	Doubt	June 25, 2015	#TRMDDoubt	16.0%	#2	#6	
35	Wedding	June 26, 2015	#TRMDWedding	16.3%	#2	#7	
36	Denial	June 29, 2015	#TRMDDenial	16.7%	#2	#6	
37	Sacrifice	June 30, 2015	#TRMDSacrifice	16.9%	#2	#7	

=== July 2015 ===
Episode		Original air date	Social Media Hashtag	AGB Nielsen Mega Manila Households in Television Homes			Ref.
Episode		Original air date	Social Media Hashtag	Rating	Timeslot Rank	Primetime Rank	Ref.
38	Jealous	July 1, 2015	#TRMDJealous	16.8%	#2	#6	
39	Risk	July 2, 2015	#TRMDRisk	14.8%	#2	#8	
40	Trouble	July 3, 2015	#TRMDTrouble	16.4%	#2	#8	
41	Honeymoon	July 6, 2015	#TRMDHoneymoon	14.8%	#2	#8	
42	Torn	July 7, 2015	#TRMDTorn	15.5%	#2	#8	
43	Threat	July 8, 2015	#TRMDThreat	14.7%	#2	#10	
44	Breakup	July 9, 2015	#TRMDBreakup	15.7%	#2	#8	
45	Enough	July 10, 2015	#TRMDEnough	17.3%	#2	#8	
46	Together	July 13, 2015	#TRMDTogether	14.5%	#2	#7	
47	Blackmail	July 14, 2015	#TRMDBlackmail	17.4%	#2	#7	
48	Beaten	July 15, 2015	#TRMDBeaten	14.0%	#2	#9	
49	Hopeless	July 16, 2015	#TRMDHopeless	16.0%	#2	#8	
50	Helpless	July 17, 2015	#TRMDHelpless	14.2%	#2	#9	
51	Trauma	July 20, 2015	#TRMDTrauma	15.6%	#2	#8	
52	Realization	July 21, 2015	#TRMDRealization	15.4%	#2	#9	
53	Nightmare	July 22, 2015	#TRMDNightmare	15.2%	#2	#8	
54	Reputation	July 23, 2015	#TRMDReputation	15.8%	#2	#8	
55	Hesitant	July 24, 2015	#TRMDHesitant	16.4%	#2	#6	
56	Captive	July 27, 2015	#TRMDCaptive	15.3%	#2	#8	
57	Separation	July 28, 2015	#TRMDSeparation	15.2%	#2	#8	
58	Lost	July 29, 2015	#TRMDLost	17.1%	#2	#8	
59	Lie	July 30, 2015	#TRMDLie	16.6%	#2	#7	
60	Discovery	July 31, 2015	#TRMDDiscovery	16.5%	#2	#6	

=== August 2015 ===
Episode		Original air date	Social Media Hashtag	AGB Nielsen Mega Manila Households in Television Homes			Ref.
Episode		Original air date	Social Media Hashtag	Rating	Timeslot Rank	Primetime Rank	Ref.
61	Attempt	August 3, 2015	#TRMDAttempt	18.9%	#2	#6	
62	Fight	August 4, 2015	#TRMDFight	15.5%	#2	#7	
63	Closure	August 5, 2015	#TRMDClosure	17.8%	#2	#7	
64	Acceptance	August 6, 2015	#TRMDAcceptance	17.2%	#2	#7	
65	Finale	August 7, 2015	#TRMDFinale	19.8%	#2	#5	
