= Grazilda =

Philippine television drama series

- Title card
- Genre: Drama; Romantic fantasy
- Directed by: Dominic Zapata
- Starring: Glaiza de Castro
- Theme music composer: Tata Betita
- Opening theme: "Kapalaran" by Glaiza de Castro
- Country of origin: Philippines
- Original language: Tagalog
- No. of episodes: 85

Production
- Executive producer: Camille Gomba-Montaño
- Camera setup: Multiple-camera setup
- Running time: 17–39 minutes
- Production company: GMA Entertainment TV

Original release
- Network: GMA Network
- Release: September 13, 2010 – January 7, 2011

Grazilda is a Philippine television drama fantasy romance series broadcast by GMA Network. The series is a loose adaptation on Drizella, the stepsister of Cinderella. Directed by Dominic Zapata, it stars Glaiza de Castro in the title role. It premiered on September 13, 2010 on the network's Telebabad line up. The series concluded on January 7, 2011, with a total of 85 episodes.

The series is streaming online on YouTube.

== Cast and characters ==
Cast

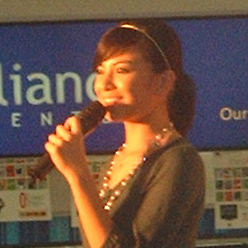
Glaiza de Castro

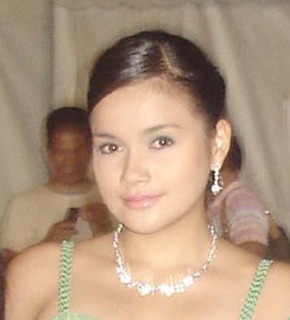
Yasmien Kurdi

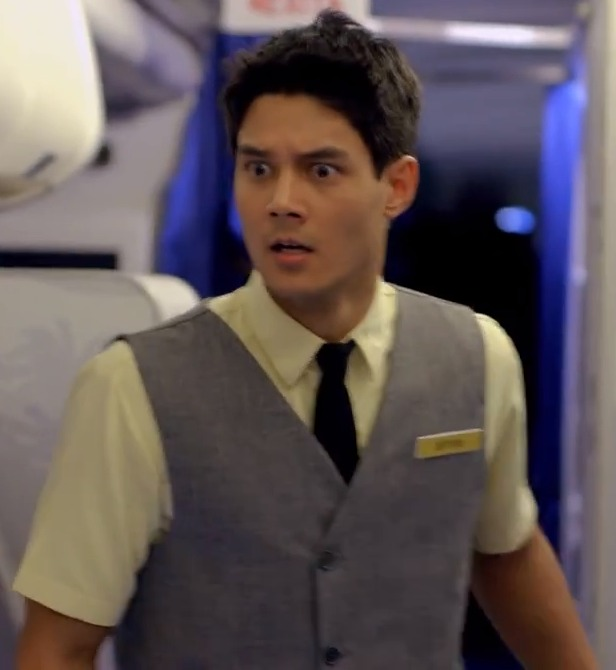
Daniel Matsunaga

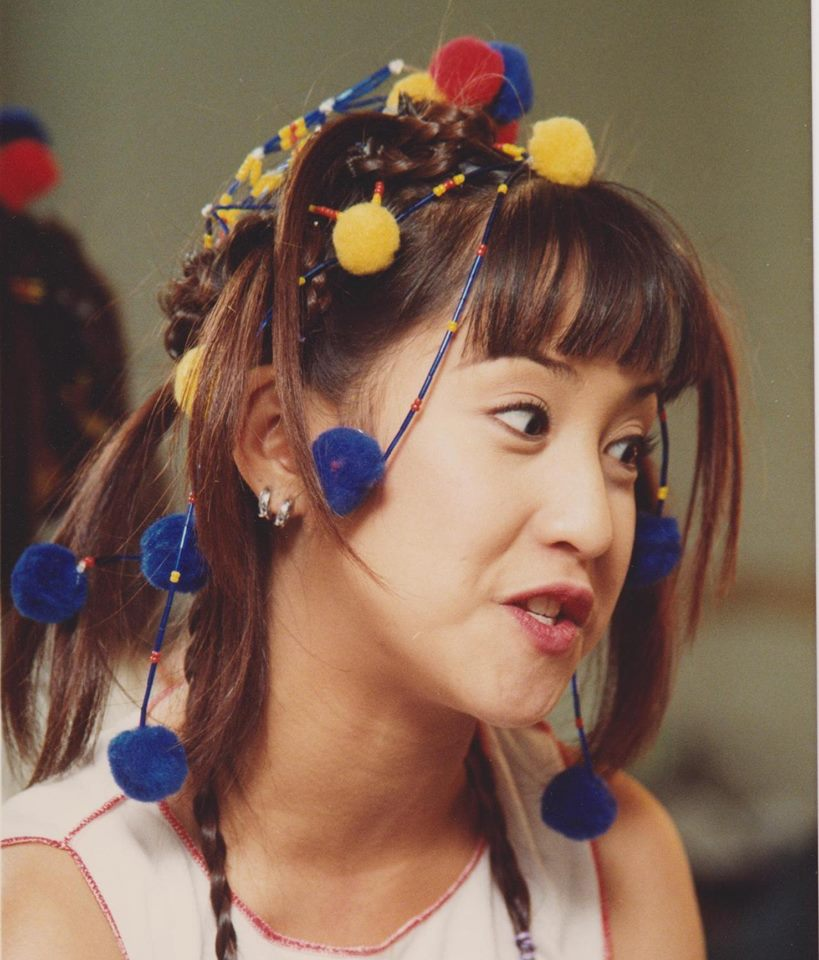
Jolina Magdangal

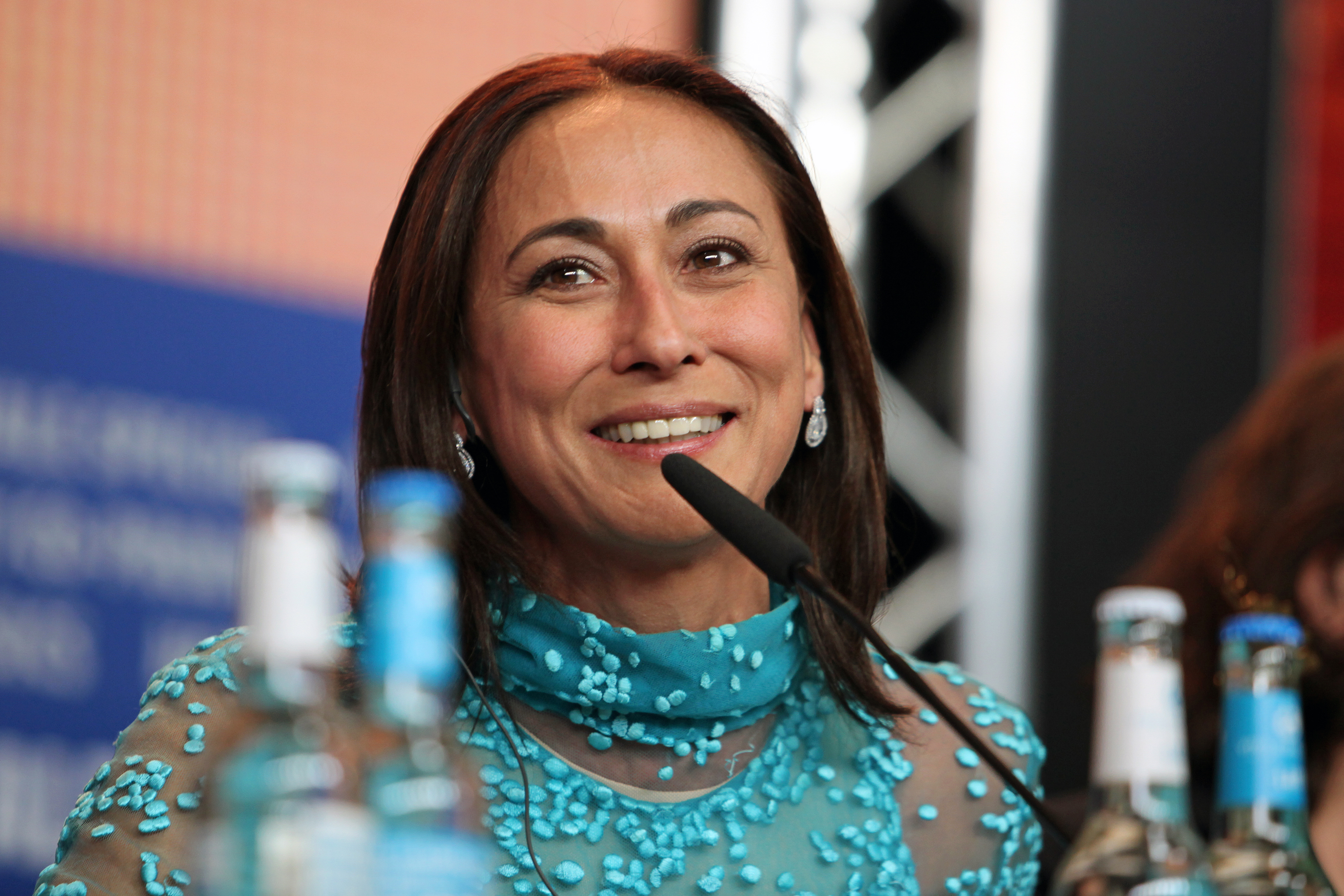
Cherie Gil

Lead cast

- Glaiza de Castro as Grazilda

Supporting cast

- Geoff Eigenmann as Eric
- Yasmien Kurdi as Cindy
- Daniel Matsunaga as Kasmir
- Jolina Magdangal as a fairy godmother
- Sheryl Cruz as Fabiola
- Cherie Gil as Veronne
- Rio Locsin as Matilda
- Joel Torre as Fernando
- Dominic Roco as Vicente
- Polo Ravales as Matthew
- Caridad Sanchez as Tisay
- Angeli Nicole Sanoy as Jik Jik

Guest cast

- Gwen Zamora as Cinderella
- Benedict Campos as Prince Charming
- Stef Prescott as Tonette
- Bodie Cruz as Ben
- Ernie Zarate as Leon
- Jobelle Salvador as Stella
- Gene Padilla as Elias
- Sherilyn Reyes as Weng
- Sarah Lahbati as Esmeralda
- Dang Cruz as Celia
- Sunshine Garcia as Precious
- Djanin Cruz as Anatalia

== Production ==
Principal photography commenced on August 26, 2010.

== Ratings ==
According to AGB Nielsen Philippines' Mega Manila People/Individual television ratings, the pilot episode of Grazilda earned a 14.5% rating.

== Accolades ==
Accolades received by Grazilda
Year	Award	Category	Recipient	Result	Ref.
2011	Golden Screen TV Awards	Outstanding Breakthrough Performance by an Actress	Djanin Cruz	Nominated	
