= 7th PMPC Star Awards for Music =

Annual Philippine music awards ceremony

- Date: November 10, 2015; November 29, 2015 (Delayed Telecast)
- Location: Kia Theatre
- Hosted by: Kim Chiu, Enchong Dee

Television/radio coverage
- Network: ABS-CBN
- Produced by: Airtime Marketing Philippines, Inc.

The Pamusikatan: 7th PMPC Star Awards for Music (organized by Philippine Movie Press Club headed by current president Joe Barrameda and produced by Airtime Marketing Philippines, Inc. headed by Tessie Celestino-Howard). It was held at the Kia Theatre in Quezon City on November 10, 2015, hosted by Kim Chiu and Enchong Dee with DJ Tom Taus, directed by Bert De Leon. It was aired on ABS-CBN's Sunday's Best on November 29 at 10:45pm.

== Nominees and winners ==
Winners are listed first and highlighted in bold.

=== Major categories ===
Album of the Year	Song of the Year
**"Celestine" – Toni Gonzaga (Star Music)**; "Expressions" – Yeng Constantino (Star Music); "Darren" – Darren Espanto (MCA Music); "Perfectly Imperfect" – Sarah Geronimo (Viva Records); "Deeper" – Julie Anne San Jose (GMA Records); "Haymabu" – Siakol (Independent); "Never Alone" – Jennylyn Mercado (GMA Records)	**"Ikaw" – Yeng Constantino (Star Music)**; **Yeng Constantino, composer**; "Mahal Ko o Mahal Ako" – KZ Tandingan (Star Music); Edwin Marollano, composer; "Akin Ka Na Lang" – Morissette (Star Music); Kiko Salazar, composer; "Mr. Right" – Kim Chiu (Star Music); Jonathan Manalo, composer; "Pare, Mahal Mo Ba Ako" – Michael Pangilinan (Star Music); Joven Tan, composer; "Mananatili" – Sheryl Cruz (Universal Records); Sheryl Cruz, composer
Male Recording Artist of the Year	Female Recording Artist of the Year
**Gloc-9 – "Biyahe ng Pangarap" (Universal Records)**; Christian Bautista – "Soundtrack" (Universal Records); Janno Gibbs – "Novela" (GMA Records); Martin Nievera – "Big Mouth, Big Band" (PolyEast Records); Noel Cabangon – "Throwback" (Universal Records); Richard Poon – "The Crooner Sings Baccarats" (Universal Records); Vice Ganda – "#Trending" (Star Music)	**Sarah Geronimo – "Perfectly Imperfect" (Viva Records)**; Jamie Rivera – "We Are All God's Children" (Star Music); Kuh Ledesma – "Memories" (Universal Records); Pilita Corrales – "Duets" (Viva Records); Sheryl Cruz – "Sa Puso Ko'y Ikaw Pa Rin" (Universal Records); Toni Gonzaga – "Celestine" (Star Music); Yeng Constantino – "All About Love" (Star Music)
New Male Recording Artist of the Year	New Female Recording Artist of the Year
**Edward Benosa – "Edward Benosa" (Star Music)**; Darren Espanto – "Darren" (MCA Music); Darryl Shy – "Darryl Shy" (Star Music); Enchong Dee – "Enchong Dee" (Star Music); Garth Garcia – "Garth Garcia" (GMA Records); Ken Chan – "Ken Chan" (PolyEast Records); Kito Romualdez – "Kito Romualdez" (Viva Records); Paolo Valenciano – "Silence/Noise" (Star Music)	**Hannah Nolasco – "Peksman" (The Rising Star-Outbox Media Production); and**; **Morissette – "Morissette" (Star Music) (tied)**; Alex Gonzaga – "I Am Alex G." (Star Music); Cherryz Mendoza – "Infatuation" (PolyEast Records); Kathryn Bernardo – "Kathryn Bernardo" (Star Music); Klarisse de Guzman – "Klarisse de Guzman" (MCA Music); Kylie Padilla – "Seasons" (GMA Records)
Duo/Group of the Year	Music Video of the Year
**The Company– "Lighthearted OPM 2" (Viva Records)**; Generation – "Generation" (Star Music); Gimme 5 – "Gimme 5" (Ivory Music); Harana – "Harana" (Star Music); Inner Voices – "Find Way" (Universal Records); Kean Cipriano and Eunice Jorge – "Happy Together" (Universal Records); Siakol – "Haymabu" (Synergy Music)	**"The Way We Were" – Christian Bautista and Rachelle Ann Go (Universal Records)**; **Christian Bautista and Joshua Bautista, directors**; "Di Man Lang Nagpaalam" – Edward Benosa (Star Music); Frank Lloyd Mamaril, director; "Ikaw" – Yeng Constantino (Star Music); Christian Escolano, director; "Impossible" – Gravity (Ivory Music); Mark Vincent Villaflor and Paolo Jaminola, directors; "Pare Mahal Mo Raw Ako" – Michael Pangilinan (Star Music); Joven Tan, director; "We Are All God's Children" – Jamie Rivera (Star Music); Eric Teotico, director

=== Rock and Acoustic category ===
Male Acoustic Artist of the Year	Female Acoustic Artist of the Year
**Noel Cabangon – "Throwback" (Universal Records)**; Darryl Shy – "Darryl Shy " (Star Music); Kito Romualdez – "Kito Romualdez " (Viva Records)	**Sabrina – "Love Acoustic 7" (PolyEast Records)**; Moira Dela Torre – "Moira" (Ivory Music)
Rock Album of the Year	Male Rock Artist of the Year
**"Haymabu" – Siakol (Synergy Music Group)**; "Frank" – Franco (MCA Music); "Langit Luha" – Silent Sanctuary (Ivory Music); "Reo Brothers of Tacloban" – Reo Brothers (Star Music); "Silence/Noise" – Paolo Valenciano (Star Music); "Synthesis" – Glaiza de Castro (Homeworks Entertainment)	**Kean Cipriano – "Happy Together" (Universal Records)**; Franco – "Frank" (MCA Music); Generation – "Generation" (Star Music); Paolo Valenciano – "Silence/Noise" (Star Music); Reo Brothers – "Reo Brothers of Tacloban" (Star Music); Siakol – "Haymabu" (Synergy Music Group); Silent Sanctuary – "Langit Luha" (Ivory Music)
Female Rock Artist of the Year	
**Glaiza de Castro – "Synthesis" (Homeworks Entertainment)**; "Eunice Jorge" – "Happy Together" (Universal Records); Yeng Constantino – Yeng Constantino (Star Music); "Wala Pang Titulo" – Ron Henley (Universal Records); "Ultrasound" – Loonie (Universal Records); "Last of a Dying Breed" – Blaze N Kane (Flipmusic Records); "Shehyee" – Shehyee (Flipmusic Records)	

=== Album category ===
Dance Album of the Year	Revival Album of the Year
**"AADA: The EDM Diva" – Ai-ai delas Alas (Star Music)**; "Enchong Dee" – Enchong Dee (Star Music); "Gimme 5" – Gimme 5 (Star Music); "#Trending" – Vice Ganda (Star Music)	**"Duets" – Pilita Corrales (Viva Records)**; "Big Mouth, Big Band" – Martin Nievera (PolyEast Records); "Mahal Pa Rin Kita" – Aljur Abrenica (MCA Music); "Memories" – Kuh Ledesma (Universal Records); "Soundtrack" – Christian Bautista (Universal Records); "The Crooner Sings Baccarats" – Richard Poon (Universal Records); "Thowback" – Noel Cabangon (Universal Records)
Compilation Album of the Year	Album Cover Design of the Year
**"Himig Handog P-pop Love Songs" – Various artists (Star Music)**; "Be Careful with My Heart : The Lullaby Album" – Various artists (Star Music); "OPM Fresh" – Various artists (Star Music); "Decades of OPM" – ABS-CBN Philharmonic Orchestra (Star Music); "PhilPop 2014" – Various artists (Universal Records); "The Love Collections from Today's Biggest Artist " – Various artists (Ivory Music)	**"Darren" – Darren Espanto (MCA Music)**; "All About Love" – Yeng Constantino (Star Music); "Journey (Kyla EP)" – Kyla (PolyEast Records); "Love Revisited" – Nikki Gil (Universal Records ); "Mahal Pa Rin Kita" – Aljur Abrenica (MCA Music); "Perfectly Imperfect" –Sarah Geronimo (Viva Records); "We Are All God's Children" – Jamie Rivera (Star Music)

=== Concert category ===
Concert of the Year	Male Concert Performer of the Year
**"Gandang-ganda sa Sarili sa Araneta" – Vice Ganda (ABS-CBN Events and Star Events)**; **Paul Basinilio, director**; "Celestine" – Toni Gonzaga (DSL Productions and Star Events); Pops Fernandez, producer; "La Nightingale" – Lani Misalucha; Paul Basinilio, director, Louie Ocampo musical director; "Most Wanted" – Daniel Padilla (ABS-CBN Events and Star Events); Johnny Manahan, director; "Musikatin" – Ogie Alcasid and Various artists; Paolo Valenciano, director; "The Company 30th Concert" – The Company (Stages Production Specialist Inc.); "Ultimate Concert" – Martin Nievera, Gary Valenciano, Regine Velasquez, and Lani Misalucha (StarMedia Entertainment and iMusic); Rowell Santiago, director; Ryan Cayabyab, musical director	**Vice Ganda – "Gandang-ganda sa Sarili sa Araneta"**; Daniel Padilla – "Most Wanted "; Gerald Santos – "It's Me"; Ogie Alcasid – "Ultimate Concert"; Martin Nievera – "Ultimate Concert"
Female Concert Performer of the Year	
**Lani Misalucha – "La Nightingale"; and**; **Regine Velasquez – "Ultimate Concert" (tied)**; Aicelle Santos – "Class A"; Alex Gonzaga – "Unexpected"; Julie Anne San Jose – "Hologram"; Morissette – "This is Me"; Toni Gonzaga – "Celestine "	

Note: There were no entries for Hip hop Album and Artist of the Year.

=== Special Awards ===
Pilita Corrales Lifetime Achievement Award: Rey Valera
Parangal Levi Celerio: Ogie Alcasid

== See also ==
- 29th PMPC Star Awards for Television
