= The Seed of Love =

2023 Philippine television drama series

- Title card
- Genre: Drama
- Created by: R.J. Nuevas
- Written by: R.J. Nuevas; Ken De Leon; Nehemiarey Dallego; Benjamin Benson Longronio
- Directed by: Ricky Davao
- Creative director: Aloy Adlawan
- Starring: Glaiza de Castro
- Opening theme: "Nang Ika'y Dumating" by Maricris Garcia
- Country of origin: Philippines
- Original language: Tagalog
- No. of episodes: 79

Production
- Executive producer: Michele Robles Borja
- Camera setup: Multiple-camera setup
- Running time: 19–27 minutes
- Production company: GMA Entertainment Group

Original release
- Network: GMA Network
- Release: May 8 – August 25, 2023

The Seed of Love is a 2023 Philippine television drama series broadcast by GMA Network. Directed by Ricky Davao, it stars Glaiza de Castro. It premiered on May 8, 2023 on the network's Afternoon Prime line up. The series concluded on August 25, 2023, with a total of 79 episodes.

The series is streaming online on YouTube.

== Premise ==
A husband and wife tackle the challenges of going through the process of an In-vitro fertilization.

== Cast and characters ==
Cast

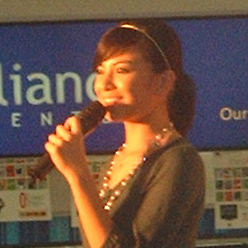
Glaiza de Castro

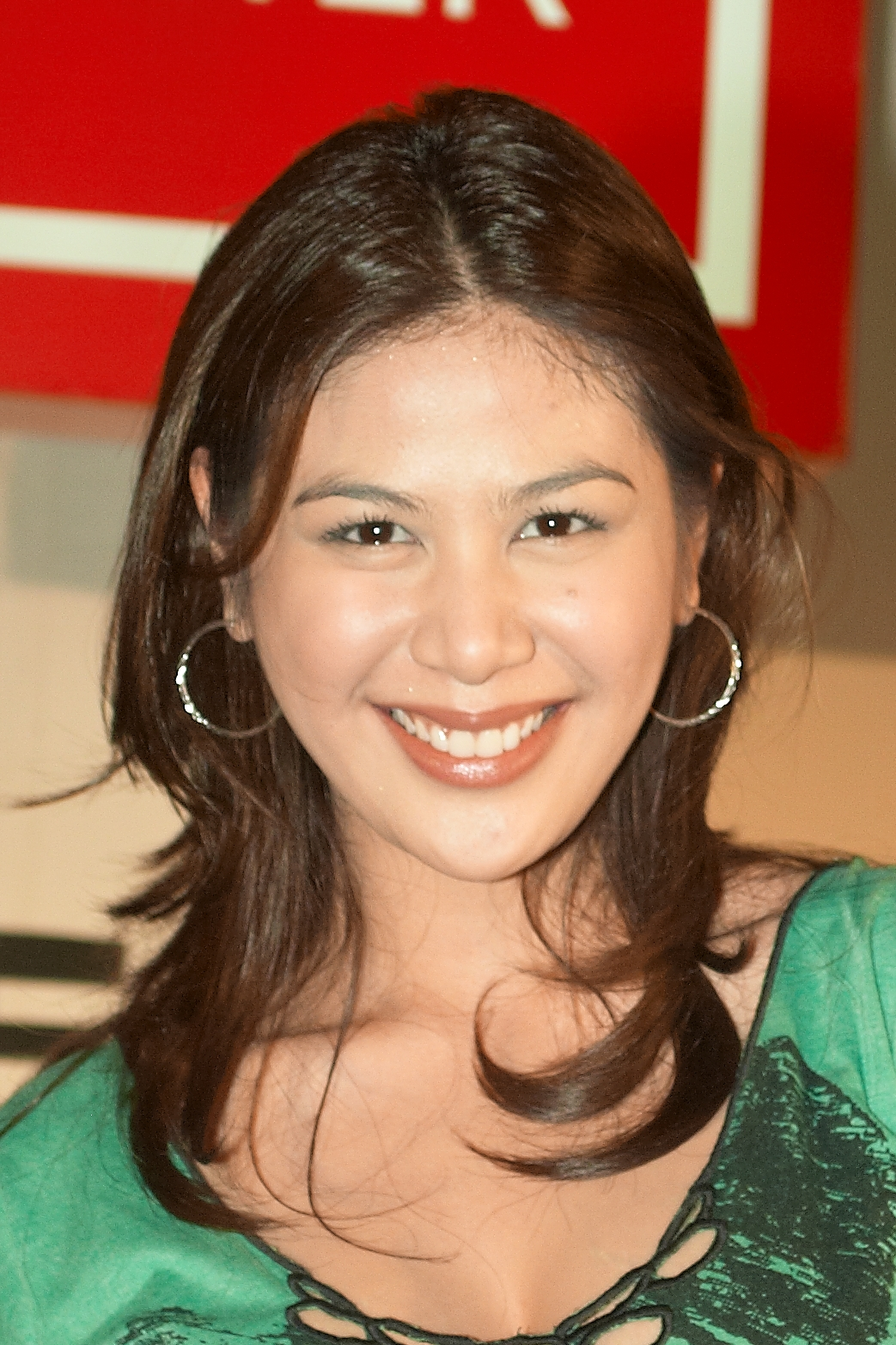
Valerie Concepcion

Lead cast

- Glaiza de Castro as Eileen Collantes-Jurado

Supporting cast

- Mike Tan as Robert Nelson "Bobby" P. Jurado Jr.
- Valerie Concepcion as Alexandra "Alexa" Cardinal
- Allan Paule as Robert "Nelson" Jurado Sr.
- Boy2 Quizon as Peter Castillano
- Tina Paner as Ludivina "Ludy" Collantes
- Bernadette Allyson-Estrada as Ginny Pelaez-Jurado
- Ervic Vijandre as Armando "Mandy" Cruzado
- Yana Asistio as Ramona "Mona" Barrientos
- Ashley Rivera as Frieda Pelayo
- Ethan Harriot as Robert Nelson "Thirdy" C. Jurado III

== Production ==
Principal photography commenced in March 2020 in Banaue, Ifugao. Filming was halted in March 2020 due to the enhanced community quarantine in Luzon caused by the COVID-19 pandemic. Filming was continued in September 2022.

== Ratings ==
According to AGB Nielsen Philippines' Nationwide Urban Television Audience Measurement People in television homes, the pilot episode of The Seed of Love earned a 7% rating.

== Accolades ==
Accolades received by The Seed of Love
Year	Award	Category	Recipient	Result	Ref.
2024	World Class Excellence Japan Awards	Best Actress	Glaiza de Castro	Won	
