= Synthesis (Glaiza de Castro album) =

2015 studio album by Glaiza de Castro

Studio album by Glaiza de Castro
- Released: April 18, 2015
- Genres: Pop, rock
- Length: 45:18
- Languages: English, Filipino
- Label: Homeworkz Services
- Producer: Glaiza de Castro

Glaiza de Castro chronology
Glaiza (2006)	Synthesis (2015)	Magandang Simulain (2017)

Synthesis (stylised as sýnthesis) is the third studio album by Filipino actress-singer Glaiza de Castro, released on April 18, 2015 by Homeworkz Services in the Philippines. The album is self-produced and was described by de Castro as a mixture of pop and rock.

Synthesis consists of eight tracks and was certified gold on September 29, 2015 by the Philippine Association of the Record Industry (PARI). For this album, de Castro earned the Female Rock Artist of the Year award at the 7th PMPC Star Awards for Music. A track from the album, "Dusk 'Til Dawn", was additionally nominated for Best Rock/Alternative Recording by the Awit Awards in 2016.

== Track listing ==
All tracks are written by Glaiza de Castro; other writers are listed below.

No.	Title	Writer(s)	Length
1.	"Country Tree"		4:49
2.	"Barcelona"	Angelica Panganiban	8:41
3.	"Waiting Shed"	Angelica Panganiban	5:29
4.	"Makataruok"	Noli Aurillo	3:53
5.	"Memo"		6:16
6.	"Sa'yo Parin"	Aimee Delgado, JP Verona, Rowel Roldan	5:28
7.	"Dusk 'Til Dawn"	Arkel Mendoza, Costa Palma Tantay	5:16
8.	"Pag-Ikot"		5:22

== Sales and certifications ==
Region	Certification	Certified units/sales
Philippines (PARI)	Gold	7,500^{*}
^{*} Sales figures based on certification alone.

== Release history ==
Country	Distributor	Release date	Format
Philippines	Homeworkz Services	April 18, 2015	Standard (CD)
Worldwide	Homeworkz Services	May 1, 2015	Digital download (via Spotify)
