= Kaputol ng Isang Awit =

2008 Philippine television drama series

- Title card
- Also known as: Unsung Melody
- Genre: Romantic drama; Musical
- Based on: Kaputol ng Isang Awit (1991) by Emmanuel H. Borlaza
- Developed by: Des Garbes-Severino
- Written by: Anna Aleta Nadela; Tina Velasco; Gilda Olvidado
- Directed by: Mike Tuviera
- Starring: Glaiza de Castro; Lovi Poe
- Theme music composer: Ogie Alcasid
- Opening theme: "Nais Ko" by Glaiza de Castro and Lovi Poe
- Country of origin: Philippines
- Original language: Tagalog
- No. of episodes: 73

Production
- Executive producer: Camille Gomba-Montaño
- Camera setup: Multiple-camera setup
- Running time: 25—35 minutes
- Production company: GMA Entertainment TV

Original release
- Network: GMA Network
- Release: March 3 – June 13, 2008

Kaputol ng Isang Awit (transl. fragment of one song / international title: Unsung Melody) is a 2008 Philippine television drama romance musical series broadcast by GMA Network. Based on a 1991 Philippine film of the same title, the series is the seventh instalment of Sine Novela. Directed by Mike Tuviera, it stars Glaiza de Castro and Lovi Poe. It premiered on March 3, 2008 on the network's Dramarama sa Hapon line up. The series concluded on June 13, 2008, with a total of 73 episodes.

== Cast and characters ==
Cast

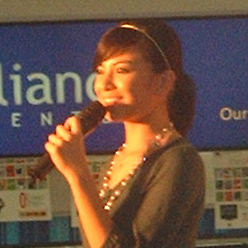
Glaiza de Castro

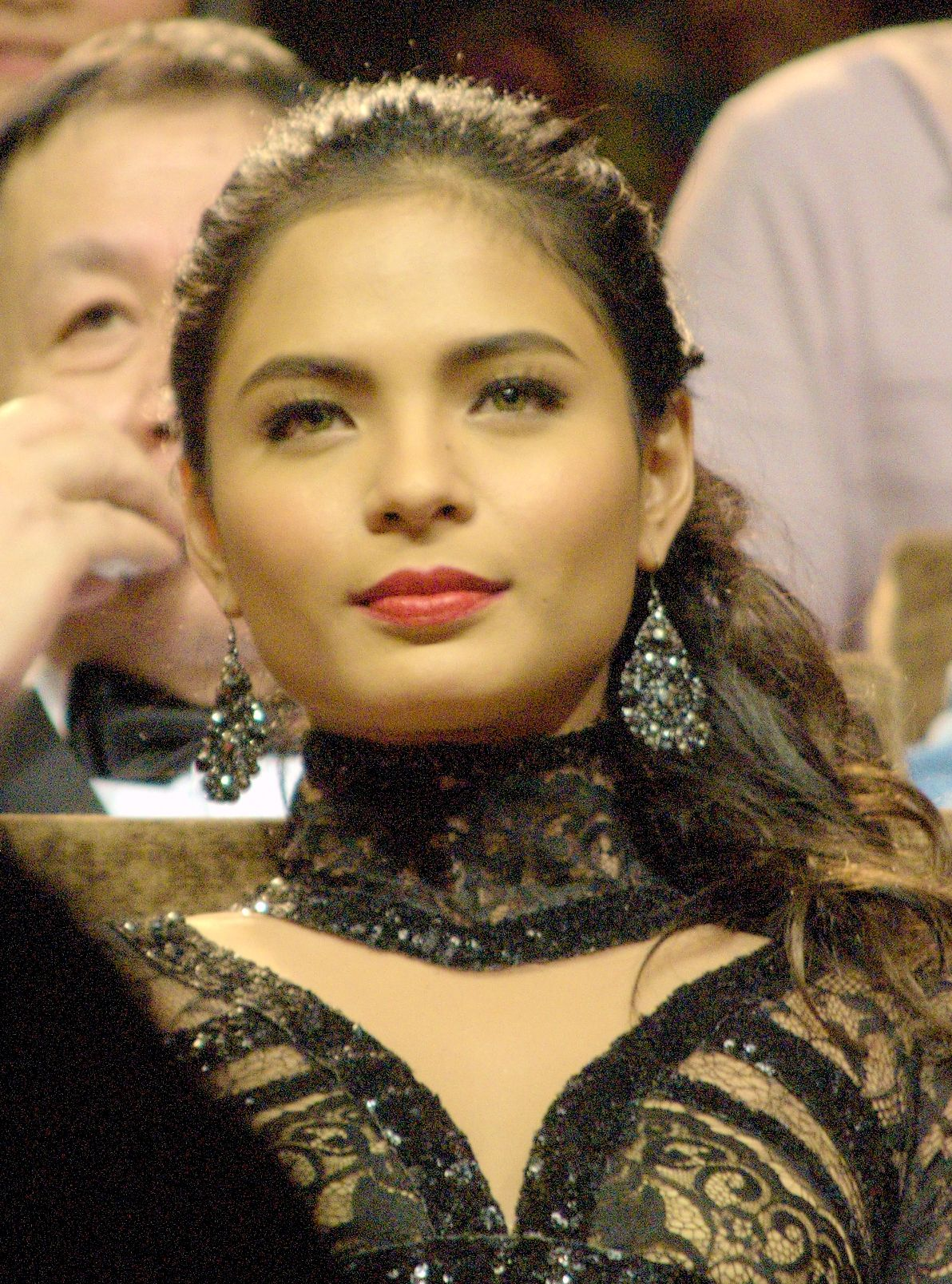
Lovi Poe

Lead cast

- Glaiza de Castro as Sarah Monteza-Rivera
- Lovi Poe as Joanna Ambrosio aka Joanna Rivera

Supporting cast

- Marky Cielo as Eric Valderama
- Jolo Revilla as Marco Salcedo
- Snooky Serna as Vina Monteza-Rivera
- Tirso Cruz III as Arsenio Rivera / Kidlat
- Gary Estrada as Julio Ambrosio
- Isabel Granada as Elena Valderama
- Leo Martinez as Ige Monteza
- Tuesday Vargas as Mimay Sison
- Jade Lopez as Daniella

Guest cast

- Jennylyn Mercado as Charmaine Ambrosio
- Rita Iringan as younger Sarah
- Bea Binene as younger Mimay
- Krystal Reyes as younger Joanna
- Tony Mabesa as Tatang Pastor

== Ratings ==
According to AGB Nielsen Philippines' Mega Manila household television ratings, the pilot episode of Kaputol ng Isang Awit earned a 20.2% rating. The final episode scored a 26.2% rating.

== Accolades ==
Accolades received by Kaputol ng Isang Awit
Year	Award	Category	Recipient	Result	Ref.
2008	22nd PMPC Star Awards for Television	Best Daytime Drama Series	Kaputol ng Isang Awit	Won	
2008	22nd PMPC Star Awards for Television	Best Drama Actor	Tirso Cruz III	Nominated	
2008	22nd PMPC Star Awards for Television	Best Drama Actress	Lovi Poe	Nominated	
