= 10th PMPC Star Awards for Music =

- Date: September 9, 2018
- Venue: Newport Performing Arts Theater, Pasay City
- Hosted by: Karylle; Kim Chiu; Christian Bautista; Aljur Abrenica; Xian Lim

The 10th PMPC Star Awards for Music by the Philippine Movie Press Club (PMPC), honored the best Filipino music of 2017. The ceremony took place on September 9, 2018 in Newport Performing Arts Theater, Pasay City.

The PMPC Star Awards for Music was hosted by Kim Chiu, Christian Bautista, Karylle, Aljur Abrenica and Xian Lim.

== Winners and nominees ==
The following are the nominations for the 10th PMPC Star Awards for Music, covering music released in 2017.

Winners are listed first and indicated in bold.

Note: the 9th and 10th PMPC Star Awards for Music was held on the same day, same venue and same hosts but the 9th Star Awards for Music was for songs in 2016, while the 10th Star Awards for Music was for songs in 2017.

=== Major categories ===
Album of the Year	Song of the Year
**"Malaya" – Moira Dela Torre (Star Music)**; "Kapit" – Christian Bautista (Universal Records); "Klarisse" – Klarisse de Guzman (Star Music); "Nakakalokal" – Ogie Alcasid (Star Music); "Palm Dreams" – James Reid (Viva Records); "Sa Kabila ng Lahat" – Rivermaya (Star Music); "This 15 Me" – Sarah Geronimo (Viva Records)	**"Hayaan Mo Sila" – Ex Battalion (Ex Battalion Music)**; "Cool Down" – James Reid (Viva Records); "Kapit" – Christian Bautista (Universal Records); "Nadarang" – Shanti Dope (Universal Records); "Nakakalokal" – Ogie Alcasid (Star Music); "Sampu" – Jona (Star Music); "Titibo-Tibo" – Moira Dela Torre (Star Music)
Male Recording Artist of the Year	Female Recording Artist of the Year
**Christian Bautista – "Kapit" (Universal Records)**; Dingdong Avanzado – "Jessa Zaragoza Hits Medley" (Star Music); Ebe Dancel – "Sa'yo" (Star Music); Janno Gibbs – "My Jagiya" (GMA Records); Ogie Alcasid – "Nakakalokal" (Star Music); Sam Milby – "Tunay Na Pag-ibig" (Star Music); Xian Lim – "Getting To Know Each Other Too Well" (Star Music)	**Moira Dela Torre – "Malaya" (Star Music)**; Glaiza De Castro – "Sinta" (PolyEast Records); Jessa Zaragoza – "Sa Ngalan Ng Pag-ibig" (Star Music); Jona – "Sampu" (Star Music); Kyla – "Only Gonna Love You" (Star Music); Laarni Lozada – "Ikaw Yun" (LST Music Production); Regine Velasquez – "Hugot" (Viva Records); Sarah Geronimo – "Ganito" (Viva Records)
New Male Recording Artist of the Year	New Female Recording Artist of the Year
**JC Santos – "Puwede Naman" (Star Music)**; Allen Cecilio – "Baby Ko" (FlipMusic Productions, Inc.); Arnold Reyes – "Sana May Forever" (LST Music Production); Erard – "Walang Forever" (Star Music); Migo Adecer – "I Long To Ask You" (GMA Records); "Neo "Kuya E" de Padua – "Ako’y Nangarap" (Big Eyes Events and Productions); Patrick Quiroz – "Ikaw Pa Rin" (Star Music); Pong Idusora – "'Di Kita Ipagpapalit" (Lodi Records); Tony Labrusca – "Tanging Ikaw" (Insight 360 Consultancy Services, Inc.)	**Kyline Alcantara – "Sundo" (GMA Records); and**; **Rayantha Leigh – "Laging Ikaw" (Ivory Music) (tied)**; Asian Juarez – "Maghihintay" (Asian Artist Agency, Inc.); Janah Zaplan – "Di Ko Na Kaya" (Ivory Music); Kisses Delavin – "Di Ko Lang Masabi" (Star Music); Leila Alcasid – "Completely In Love" (Star Music); Maymay Entrata – "Toinks" (Star Music); Regine Tolentino – "Moving To the Music" (Viva Records); Sofia Romualdez – "Thinkin' Of U" (Viva Records)
Duo/Group of the Year	Music Video of the Year
**The Company – "Lovely Day" (Universal Records)**; Agsunta – "Di Ba Halata" (Star Music); Ben&Ben – "Kathang Isip" (Warner Music Philippines); BoyBandPH – "Hanggang Kailan Kaya" (Star Music); Broadway Boys – "Nag-iisa" (TAPE Inc.); Clique 5 – "Teka Muna" (316 Records); Miko and Gab – "Hugot" (Star Music)	**Follow My Lead” – Ex Battalion (Frontrow International)**; **Titus Cee, director**; "Bounce" – Regine Tolentino (Viva Records); Nolan Bernardino and Dondi Narciso, directors; "Cool Down" – James Reid (Viva Records); Deej Fabian, director; "Huwag Ka Nang Umuwi" – Matteo Guidicelli (Star Music); Stephen Ngo, director; "Paulit-Ulit" – Kristoffer Martin (GMA Records); Miggy Tanchanco, director; "Pinipigil" – Yeng Constantino (Star Music); Paul Basinilio, director; "Sinta" – Glaiza de Castro (PolyEast Records); Alwyn Uytingco, director; "Tagpuan" – Moira Dela Torre (Star Music); John Prats, director

=== Pop category ===
Pop Album of the Year	Male Pop Artist of the Year
**"Palm Dreams" – James Reid (Viva Records)**; "Breakthrough" – Julie Anne San Jose (Universal Records); "Key Of X" – Xian Lim (Star Music); "Klarisse" – Klarisse de Guzman (Star Music); "Nagbabalik" – Janno Gibbs (GMA Records); "Sam: 12" – Sam Milby (Star Music); "This 15 Me" – Sarah Geronimo (Viva Records); "Touch of Your Love" – Kim Chiu (Star Music)	**James Reid –"Cool Down" (Viva Records); and**; **Xian Lim – "Download" (Star Music) (tied)**; Bryan Termulo – "Agwat" (Ivory Music); Chivas – "Hindi Ko Kaya" (LST Music Production); Juan Karlos Labajo – "Demonyo" (MCA Music, Inc.); Matteo Guidicelli – "Hey" (Star Music); Sam Milby – "Who’s That Girl" (Star Music)
Female Pop Artist of the Year	
**Kim Chiu – "Okay Na Ako" (Star Music)**; Julie Anne San Jose – "Tayong Dalawa" (Universal Records); Klarisse de Guzman – "Wala Na Talaga" (Star Music); Marion Aunor – "Akala" (Viva Records); Moira Dela Torre – "Tagpuan" (Star Music); Nadine Lustre – "Stay Up" (Viva Records); Sarah Geronimo – "Ganito" (Viva Records)	

=== Rock, Rap, RnB and Acoustic category ===
Rock Album of the Year	Rock Artist of the Year
**"Sa Kabila Ng Lahat" – Rivermaya (Star Music)**; "Flight" – Franco (MCA Music); "Strings Attached" – Moonstar88 (Alpha Music Corporation); "Synesthesia" – Yeng Constantino (Star Music); "Whatever That Was" – She's Only Sixteen (Cleverheads Media)	**Rivermaya – "Manila" (Star Music)**; Franco – "Last Word" (MCA Music); Moonstar88 – "Huwag Na Muna" (Alpha Music Corporation); She's Only Sixteen – "Leave Me Out of It" (Cleverheads Media); Yeng Constantino – "Pinipigil" (Star Music)
RnB Album of the Year	RnB Artist of the Year
**"BTTR" – Jensen and the Flips (Yellow Room Music Philippines)**; "Kamusta Ka" – Jay R (Homeworkz Entertainment Services); "The Queen of R&B" – Kyla (Star Music)	**Michael Pangilinan**; Franco – "Last Word" (MCA Music); Moonstar88 – "Huwag Na Muna" (Alpha Music Corporation); Rivermaya – "Manila" (Star Music); She's Only Sixteen – "Leave Me Out of It" (Cleverheads Media); Yeng Constantino – "Pinipigil" (Star Music)
Rap Album of the Year	Rap Artist of the Year
**"Materyal" – Shanti Dope (Universal Records)**; "Ating Panahon" – 727 Clique (Warner Music Philippines); "Realistick" – Stick Figgas (MCA Music); "Rap Heartist" – Abbadon (Thugszilla Productions); "Rotonda" – Gloc-9 (Universal Records)	**Ex Battalion – "Hayaan Mo Sila" (Ex Battalion Music)**; 727 Clique – "Ating Panahon" (Warner Music Philippines); Abbadon – "Dear Marcelo" (Thugszilla Productions); Abra –"Tirador" (Artifice Records); Franchize – "Sulong" (GMA Records); Gloc-9 – "Ice Tubig" (Universal Records); Shanti Dope – "Nadarang" (Universal Records); Stick Figgas – "Lamanloob" (MCA Music)
Acoustic Album of the Year	Male Acoustic Artist of the Year
**"Biyahe Pa Rin" – Noel Cabangon (Universal Records)**; "Biyaheng Langit" – Davey Langit (Star Music); "Even Such Is Time" – Cynthia Alexander (Cynthia Alexander Music); "This" – Migz Haleco (Star Music)	**Migz Haleco – "Bes" (Star Music)**; Davey Langit – "Idjay" (Star Music); Noel Cabangon – "Tadhana" (Universal Records)
Female Acoustic Artist of the Year	
**Jingle Buena – "Our Shadows Can’t Lie" (LST Music Production)**; Cynthia Alexander – "Even Such Is Time" (Cynthia Alexander Music); Keiko Necesario – "Panaginip" (Stages Sessions)	

=== Album category ===
Compilation Album of the Year	Revival Album of the Year
**"Sana May Forever... The Love Album" – Various artists (LST Music Production)**; "Feels" – Various Artists (Ivory Music); "Himig Handog" – Various artists (Star Music); "Hugot Sa Tag-Ulan" – Various artists (Insight 360 Consultancy Services Inc.); "Songs I Grew Up With" – RJ Jacinto (RJ Productions)	**"20/30" – Dingdong Avanzado and Jessa Zaragoza (Star Music)**; "Biyahe Pa Rin" – Noel Cabangon (Universal Records); "Nostalgia 2" – The Company (Universal Records); "R.30" – Regine Velasquez (Viva Records); "Songs I Grew Up With" – RJ Jacinto (RJ Productions)
Dance Album of the Year	Album Cover of the Year
**"Moving To The Music" – Regine Tolentino (Viva Records)**; "Clique 5" – Clique 5 (316 Records); "Electro Sitti" – Sitti (MCA Music); "Love, BoybandPH" – BoybandPH (Star Music)	**"Nakakalokal" – Ogie Alcasid (Star Music)**; "20/30" – Jessa Zaragoza and Dingdong Avanzado (Star Music); "Magandang Simulain" – Glaiza de Castro (PolyEast Records); "Malaya" – Moira Dela Torre (Star Music); "Queen Of R&B" – Kyla (Star Music); "Synesthesia" – Yeng Constantino (Star Music)

=== Concert category ===
Concert of the Year	Male Concert Performer of the Year
**#PaMore – Martin Nievera, Ogie Alcasid, Erik Santos, and Regine Velasquez (Starmedia Entertainment)**; All About Love – Jed Madela (Ang Mata’y Alagain Foundation, Inc.); Love in Motion – Gary Valenciano (GV Productions, Inc. and Manila Genesis Entertainment and Management); Morisette is Made – Morissette (Aldueza Events Productions); Timeless OPM – Rico J. Puno, Imelda Papin, Rey Valera, and Claire dela Fuente (Starmedia Entertainment); Prima Jona – Jona (Star Events, ABS-CBN Events and Creative Media Entertainment); R3.O – Regine Velasquez (iMusic Entertainment and Viva Live, Inc.); This 15 Me – Sarah Geronimo (Viva Live, Inc.)	**Jed Madela – All About Love (Ang Mata’y Alagain Foundation, Inc.)**; Erik Santos – #Pamore (Starmedia Entertainment); Gary Valenciano – Love in Motion (GV Productions, Inc. and Manila Genesis Entertainment and Management); James Reid – Revolution, JaDine Concert (Viva Live, Inc.); Martin Nievera – #Pamore (Starmedia Entertainment); Ogie Alcasid – Nakakalokal (World Vision and A-Team); Rico J. Puno – Timeless OPM (Starmedia Entertainment); Xian Lim – Songs In The Key Of X (KimXian Around The Globe, Inc.)
Female Concert Performer of the Year	
**Morisette, Morisette Is Made (Aldueza Events Productions)**; Ai-Ai Delas Alas – Ai Heart U (Starmedia Entertainment); Jona – Prima Jona (Star Events, ABS-CBN Events and Creative Media Entertainment); Maja Salvador – Maja on Stage (Four Lights Entertainment Productions); Manilyn Reynes – The Triplet Concert (Striking Star Productions); Regine Velasquez – R3.0 (iMusic Entertainment and Viva Live, Inc.); Sarah Geronimo – This 15 Me (Viva Live, Inc.)	

Note: There were no entries for Alternative Album of the Year and Novelty category

=== Special awards ===
Gawad Levi Celerio Lifetime Achievement Award: Gary Valenciano

Pilita Corrales Lifetime Achievement Award: Basil Valdez
