= False Positive (TV series) =

2022 Philippine television drama series

- Title card
- Genre: Romantic comedy; Fantasy drama
- Created by: Renato Custodio Jr.
- Directed by: Irene Villamor
- Starring: Glaiza de Castro; Xian Lim
- Theme music composer: Ann Margaret Figueroa
- Opening theme: "Iyo Hanggang Dulo" by Glaiza de Castro and Xian Lim
- Country of origin: Philippines
- Original language: Tagalog
- No. of episodes: 19

Production
- Executive producer: Mona Coles-Mayuga
- Camera setup: Multiple-camera setup
- Running time: 24–29 minutes
- Production company: GMA Entertainment Group

Original release
- Network: GMA Network
- Release: May 2 – May 27, 2022

False Positive is a 2022 Philippine television drama comedy fantasy series broadcast by GMA Network. Directed by Irene Emma Villamor, it stars Glaiza de Castro and Xian Lim. It premiered on May 2, 2022 on the network's Telebabad line up. The series concluded on May 27, 2022, with a total of 19 episodes.

The series is streaming online on YouTube.

== Cast and characters ==
Cast

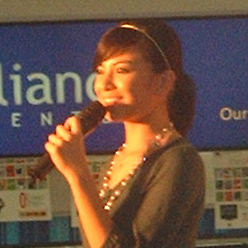
Glaiza de Castro

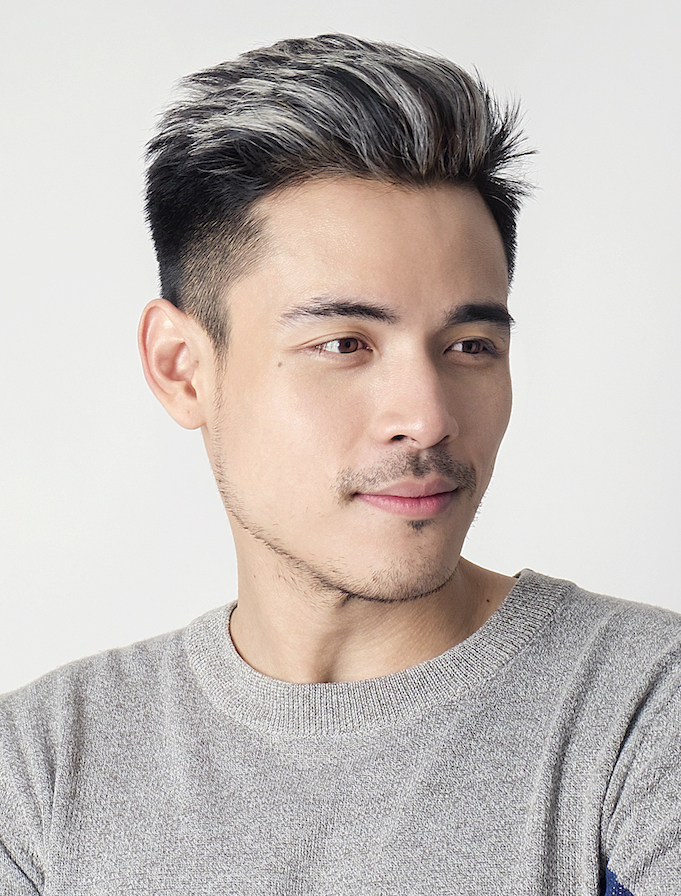
Xian Lim

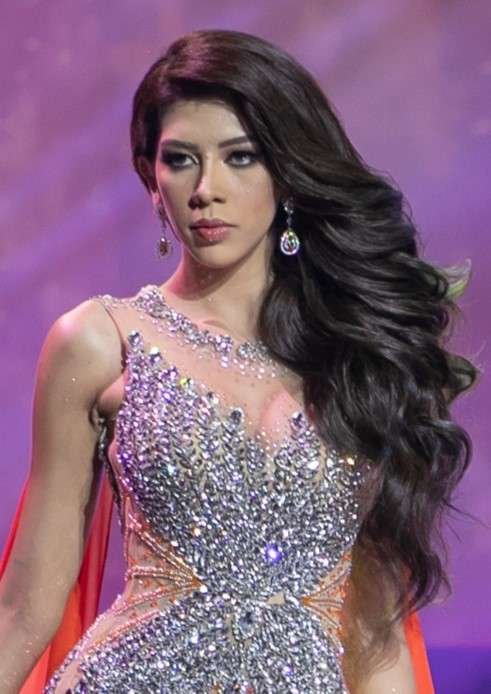
Herlene Budol

Lead cast

- Glaiza de Castro as Alyanna "Yannie" Ramirez-dela Guardia
- Xian Lim as Edward dela Guardia

Supporting cast

- Herlene Budol as Maganda
- Buboy Villar as Malakas
- Yvette Sanchez as Paulina Dare
- Dianne dela Fuente as Maritess Soto
- Rochelle Pangilinan as Bernice Siodora
- Dominic Roco as Froilan Siodora
- Luis Hontiveros as Devon Rosales
- Tonton Gutierrez as Rodrigo dela Guardia
- Alma Concepcion as Marla dela Guardia
- Nova Villa as Mamerta "Mema" Ramirez

== Production ==
Principal photography commenced on November 27, 2021. Filming resumed in January 2022.

== Ratings ==
According to AGB Nielsen Philippines' Nationwide Urban Television Audience Measurement People in television homes, the pilot episode of False Positive earned a 9.6% rating.
