= The Rich Man's Daughter =

2015 Philippine television drama series

- Title card
- Genre: Romantic drama
- Created by: Suzette Doctolero
- Written by: Suzette Doctolero; Geng Delgado; Jason Lim; Paul Sta. Ana
- Directed by: Dominic Zapata
- Creative director: Roy C. Iglesias
- Starring: Rhian Ramos; Glaiza de Castro
- Theme music composer: Pearlsha Abubakar
- Opening theme: "Be With You" by Aicelle Santos
- Ending theme: "Till It's Time" by Glaiza de Castro
- Country of origin: Philippines
- Original language: Tagalog
- No. of episodes: 65 (list of episodes)

Production
- Executive producer: Nieva M. Sabit
- Production locations: Quezon City, Philippines
- Editors: Dic Lavastida; Robert Reyes
- Camera setup: Multiple-camera setup
- Running time: 25–41 minutes
- Production company: GMA Entertainment TV

Original release
- Network: GMA Network
- Release: May 11 – August 7, 2015

The Rich Man's Daughter is a 2015 Philippine television drama romance series broadcast by GMA Network. Directed by Dominic Zapata, it stars Rhian Ramos in the title role and Glaiza de Castro. It premiered on May 11, 2015 on the network's Telebabad line up. The series concluded on August 7, 2015, with a total of 65 episodes.

The series is streaming online on YouTube.

== Premise ==
Jade Tanchingco is born into a wealthy and traditional Chinese-Filipino family. She always believed she would end up married to her boyfriend, David, until she falls in love with a woman, Althea Guevarra.

== Cast and characters ==
Cast

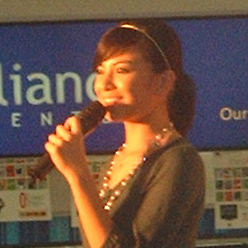
Glaiza de Castro

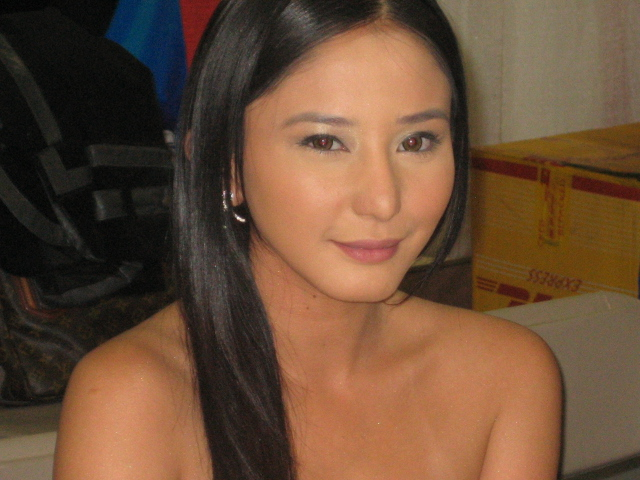
Katrina Halili

Lead cast

- Rhian Ramos as Jade Tanchingco
- Glaiza de Castro as Althea Guevarra

Supporting cast

- Luis Alandy as David Limjoco
- Katrina Halili as Louella "Wila" Mateo
- Mike Tan as Paul Tanchingco
- Chynna Ortaleza as Batchi Luna
- Sheena Halili as Sally Lim-Tanchingco
- Gloria Romero as Ama Cecilia Tanchingco
- Pauleen Luna as Pearl Sy-Tanchingco
- Paolo Contis as Tommy Alvaro
- TJ Trinidad as Gabriel Tanchingco
- Charee Pineda as Angeline "Angie" San Jose
- Stephanie Sol as Abby Reyes-Luna
- Al Tantay as Oscar "Oca" Tanchingco
- Glydel Mercado as Amanda Dionisio-Tanchingco
- Tony Mabesa as John Tanchingco

Guest cast

- Raquel Monteza as Julie Limjoco
- Bryan Benedict as Gerald Luna
- Eva Darren as Isabeli Tanchingco
- Bing Davao as Lucky Tanchingco
- Lito Legaspi as Felix Guevarra
- Marc Justine Alvarez as Miggy Alvaro
- Kariz Espinosa as Marinelle Luna
- Ken Alfonso as Lester
- Ken Chan as younger Angkong
- Jackie Rice as younger Ama
- Robert Arevalo as JunJun
- Andrew Schimmer as Jay
- Solenn Heussaff as Kathleen

== Casting ==
Actress Marian Rivera was originally cast for role of Jade Tanchingco. She later left the series in April 2015, due to her pregnancy. In the same month, actress Rhian Ramos was hired as replacement.

== Production ==
Principal photography commenced in April 2015.

== Ratings ==
According to AGB Nielsen Philippines' Mega Manila household television ratings, the pilot episode of The Rich Man's Daughter earned a 20.7% rating, which is the series' highest rating. The final episode scored a 19.8% rating.

== Accolades ==
Accolades received by The Rich Man's Daughter
Year	Award	Category	Recipient	Result	Ref.
2015	29th PMPC Star Awards for Television	Best Primetime Drama Series	The Rich Man's Daughter	Nominated	
2015	29th PMPC Star Awards for Television	Best Supporting Actor	Mike Tan	Nominated	
2015	4th Readers Choice Television	Best Primetime Drama Series	The Rich Man's Daughter	Won	
2015	4th Readers Choice Television	Best Primetime Drama Actress	Rhian Ramos	Won	
2015	4th Readers Choice Television	Best Primetime Drama Supporting Actor	Mike Tan	Won	
2015	4th Readers Choice Television	Best Primetime Drama Supporting Actress	Chynna Ortaleza	Won	
