= Contessa (TV series) =

2018 Philippine television drama series

- Title card
- Genre: Drama thriller
- Created by: Marlon Miguel
- Written by: Christine Novicio; Marlon Miguel; Renato Custodio; Rona Lean Sales
- Directed by: Albert Langitan
- Creative director: Roy Iglesias
- Starring: Glaiza de Castro
- Theme music composer: Vehnee Saturno
- Opening theme: "Dito sa Aking Mundo" by Glaiza de Castro
- Country of origin: Philippines
- Original language: Tagalog
- No. of episodes: 147 (list of episodes)

Production
- Executive producer: Rosie Lyn M. Atienza
- Editors: Maita Dator-Causapin; Lara Linsangan; Mike Donald Robles
- Camera setup: Multiple-camera setup
- Running time: 20–38 minutes
- Production company: GMA Entertainment Content Group

Original release
- Network: GMA Network
- Release: March 19 – September 8, 2018

Contessa (transl. countess) is a 2018 Philippine television drama thriller series broadcast by GMA Network. Directed by Albert Langitan, it stars Glaiza de Castro in the title role. It premiered on March 19, 2018, on the network's Afternoon Prime and Sabado Star Power sa Hapon line up. The series concluded on September 8, 2018, with a total of 147 episodes.

The series is streaming online on YouTube.

== Premise ==
Bea gets accused and imprisoned for a crime she did not commit, is determined to seek revenge on the people who took everything and everyone she loved away from her. She claims a new identity as Contessa and will seek for redemption and justice.

== Cast and characters ==
Cast

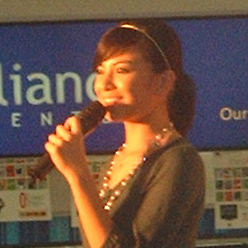
Glaiza de Castro

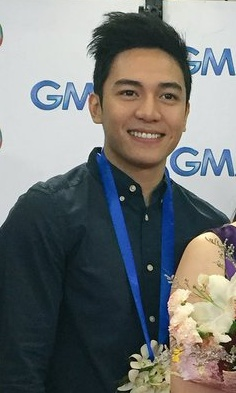
Jak Roberto

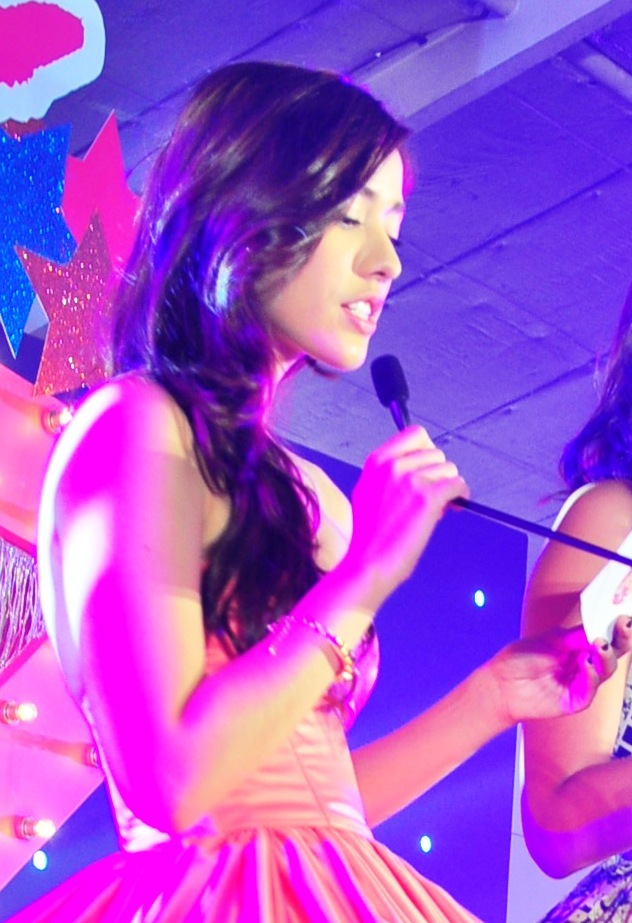
Lauren Young

Lead cast

- Glaiza de Castro as Beatrice "Bea" Resureccion-Caballero / Contessa Venganza

Supporting cast

- Geoff Eigenmann as Gabriel R. Caballero
- Jak Roberto as Santiago "Jong" Generoso Jr.
- Gabby Eigenmann as Victorino "Vito" C. Imperial Jr. / Duquessa Dolce Vita
- Lauren Young as Daniella "Dani" C. Imperial
- Chanda Romero as Charito Castillo vda. de Imperial / Black Scorpion
- Tetchie Agbayani as Guadalupe "Guada" Sarmiento vda. de Venganza / Dragona / Queen V.
- Leandro Baldemor as Santiago "Tiago" Generoso Sr.
- Dominic Roco as Oliver Sta. Ana
- Bernadette Allyson as Sarah Imperial
- Melissa Mendez as Helen Ramirez vda. de Caballero
- Mon Confiado as Armando "Arman" Wilwayco
- Tanya Gomez as Linda Resurreccion
- Karel Marquez as Virginia "Gigi" Palaroan
- Phytos Ramirez as Winston Mallari
- Denise Barbacena as Miadora Jimenez
- Will Ashley De Leon as Elijah "Ely" Resureccion Venganza

Guest cast

- Mark Herras as Marco R. Caballero
- Toby Alejar as Cordero
- Shermaine Santiago as a fortune teller
- J-mee Katanyag as Angela
- Antonette Garcia as Chunna
- Angeli Bayani as Yolly
- Andrea Torres as Contessa Venganza
- Al Tantay as Pablo Venganza
- Jay Arcilla as Jonas Zamora
- Patricia Tumulak as Marga Antonio
- Mike Magat as Lamberto "Berto" Zamora
- Divine Tetay as Misha Wilton
- Shaira Diaz as Ces Hidalgo
- Tyler Gatdula as Harold Villarama
- Philip Lazaro as Marusca
- Janice Hung as Mystie
- Nicole Donesa as Monique
- Stephanie Sol as Lara
- Roi Vinzon as Felipe
- Paolo Gumabao as Jigo
- Neil Ryan Sese as Eric
- Ervic Vijandre as Enzo
- Max Collins as Perfida Ledesma
- Joshua Zamora as Jimmy / Paul
- Elizabeth Oropesa as Rowena

== Production ==
Principal photography commenced in November 2017. Filming concluded on September 4, 2018.

== Ratings ==
According to AGB Nielsen Philippines' Nationwide Urban Television Audience Measurement People in television homes, the pilot episode of Contessa earned a 5.2% rating. The final episode scored a 6.8% rating.

== Accolades ==
Accolades received by Contessa
Year	Award	Category	Recipient	Result	Ref.
2018	32nd PMPC Star Awards for Television	Best Daytime Drama Series	Contessa	Won	
2018	32nd PMPC Star Awards for Television	Best Drama Actress	Glaiza de Castro	Nominated	
2018	32nd PMPC Star Awards for Television	Best Drama Supporting Actor	Gabby Eigenmann	Won	
2018	1st Asian Academy Creative Awards	Best Actor in a Supporting Role (National)	Gabby Eigenmann	Won	
2018	8th EdukCircle Awards	Best Actress (Drama Series)	Glaiza de Castro	Won	
