= Still Life (2007 film) =

2007 film

- Film poster
- Directed by: Katski Flores
- Screenplay by: Katski Flores
- Story by: Ron Capinding; Glaiza de Castro; Dimples Romana; Irma Adlawan
- Produced by: Katski Flores
- Cinematography: Dan Villegas
- Edited by: Maui Mauricio
- Music by: Wincy Aquino Ong
- Production companies: Cinemalaya Foundation; Cutting Edge Production; Sining Ko Ito Productions
- Distributed by: Cinemalaya
- Release date: July 21, 2007 (Philippines)
- Country: Philippines
- Languages: Tagalog; Filipino

Still Life is a 2007 Filipino film written, directed, and produced by Katski Flores and starring Glaiza de Castro with John Lloyd Cruz in a minor cameo role.

== Plot ==
James Masino is a gifted painter diagnosed with Guillain–Barré syndrome (GBS). His doctor tells him he will eventually become completely paralyzed. Facing a future where he can no longer paint, James packs up his life in the city and enters a self-imposed exile at a friend's isolated house on a deserted island. His goal is to paint his final masterpiece and then die.

His plans are thwarted when a girl shows up at the house, named Emma, who claims she has also been given access by the owner to spend a few days there. With no way to contact the outside world, James decides to let Emma stay at the house with him. At first, he is annoyed by disrupting his peace in the house. Slowly, he is drawn to Emma against his will. One night, Emma discovers in his secret room a wall filled with sketches of her. They become friends that evening and confide in each other their stories.

Emma learns of James' plan and tells him he is being a coward. They talk about the philosophy of suicide and why it cannot be a legitimate choice. Emma reminds James life is precious. She tells him her story, that she got pregnant by a lover who abandoned her, and she was forced to give the baby up for adoption to give it a better life.

Somehow, the friendship inspires James, and finally, after spending an afternoon in a nearby town, James finds the inspiration for his final piece. Emma is his mode. But just as he begins to paint, his disease strikes, and he collapses in a painful seizure.

He wakes up in a hospital with his mother crying. She tells him they found him at the house, with his hands bleeding. James remembers he attempted to kill himself on the first night he arrived at the house. But he thought he chickened out. It turns out he didn't, and the entire experience, including meeting Emma, was just a dream. His mother begs him not to do anything like that again. She reminds him that whatever happens, they will make it as a family. They will help him. There is life after art.

Sometime later, James returns to the house and finishes the painting. His parents are seen at the tomb of the woman who gave James to them to adopt. They are holding a small framed print of James' final masterpiece—a painting of her. The last scene shows James being interviewed by an actor, and he tells him he doesn't know what happened, nor can he explain it. He is just happy that he met her in his dream.

== Cast ==
- Ron Capinding as James
- Glaiza de Castro as Emma
- Dimples Romana
- Irma Adlawan
- Morny de Guzman
- Joseph Dela Cruz
- Alcris Galura

== Awards and nominations ==
Year	Award-giving body	Category	Recipient	Result
2007	Balanghai Trophy (Cinemalaya Independent Film Festival)	Best Film	Katski Flores	Nominated
2008	Philippines Golden Screen Awards	Best Visual Effects	August Lyle Espino	Won
2008	Philippines Golden Screen Awards	Best Cinematography	Dan Villegas	Nominated
2008	Philippines Golden Screen Awards	Best Editing	Maui Mauricio	Nominated
2008	Philippines Golden Screen Awards	Best Motion Picture (Drama)		Nominated
2008	Philippines Golden Screen Awards	Best Original Song	Cynthia Alexander ("Comfort In Your Strangeness")	Nominated
2008	Philippines Golden Screen Awards	Best Performance by an Actress in a Lead Role (Drama)	Glaiza de Castro	Nominated
2008	Philippines Golden Screen Awards	Best Production Design	Cris Silva	Nominated
2008	Philippines Golden Screen Awards	Best Sound	Joey Santos, Katski Flores	Nominated
2008	Philippines Golden Screen Awards	Breakthrough Performance by an Actor	Ron Capinding	Nominated
2008	FAMAS Awards	Best Cinematography	Dan Villegas	Nominated
2008	Gawad Urian Awards	Best Actress	Glaiza de Castro	Nominated
2008	Gawad Urian Awards	Best Cinematography	Dan Villegas	Nominated
2008	Star Awards	Digital Movie Cinematographer of the Year	Dan Villegas	Nominated
2008	YCC Awards (Young Critics Circle, Philippines)	Best Achievement in Cinematography and Visual Design	Dan Villegas, Cris Silva	Nominated
2008	YCC Awards (Young Critics Circle, Philippines)	Best Achievement in Sound and Aural Orchestration	Joey Santos, Wincy Aquino Ong	Nominated
2008	YCC Awards (Young Critics Circle, Philippines)	Best Performance by Male or Female, Adult or Child, Individual or Ensemble in Leading or Supporting Role	Ron Capinding	Nominated
