= Glaiza de Castro =

Filipino actress and singer (born 1988)

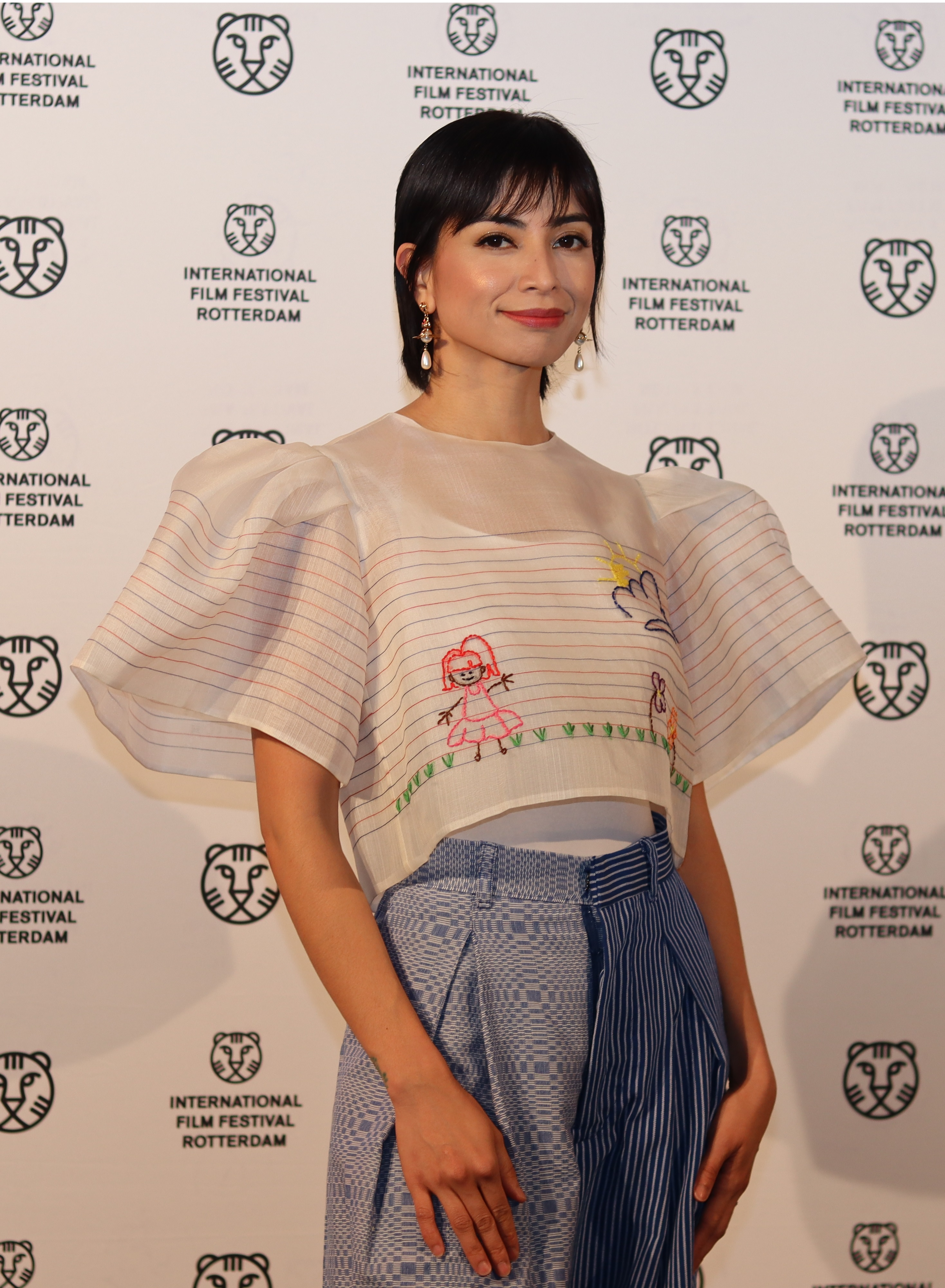
- De Castro at the 2026 International Film Festival Rotterdam
- Born: Glaiza Castro Galura; January 21, 1988 (age 38); Valenzuela, Philippines
- Occupations: Actress; singer
- Years active: 2001–present
- Works: Filmography
- Spouse: David Rainey (m. 2021)
- Awards: Full list

Glaiza Castro Galura-Rainey (/ˈɡlaɪzɑː/ GLY-zah; born January 21, 1988), professionally known by her stage name Glaiza de Castro, is a Filipina actress and singer. She is known for playing various roles in television and mainstream, independent, and sociopolitical films. Her performances have earned her accolades, including a Luna Award and a Facine Film Festival Award, as well as several FAMAS Awards and Gawad Urian Awards nominations.

At age 13, de Castro made her first screen appearance in the series Kasangga in 2001. She continued playing minor and supporting roles in the succeeding years and rose to fame after playing Eunice Aragon in the series Stairway to Heaven (2009). The following year, de Castro starred in her first titular role, Grazilda (2010), and played Binayaan in the historical epic series Amaya (2011). She gained further recognition as Heidi Fernandez in the series Temptation of Wife (2012). Her performance earned her a nomination at the Golden Screen TV Awards for Outstanding Supporting Actress in a Drama Series. In 2015, she starred alongside Rhian Ramos in the first lesbian series in the Philippines, The Rich Man's Daughter.

For her role as Pirena in the drama fantasy series Encantadia (2016), she won Best Actress at the Gawad Filipino Media People's Choice Awards and Television Actress of the Year at the PEPsters' Choice Awards. In 2018, de Castro starred in another titular role, Contessa, which earned her Best Actress wins at the EdukCircle Awards and the Alta Media Icon Awards. In 2022, she starred in the variety series Running Man Philippines with an ensemble cast. De Castro has also gained critical acclaim for her performances in the films Still Life (2007), Astig (2009), Liway (2018), and Midnight in a Perfect World (2020). As a recording artist, she has earned a gold record for her album Synthesis (2015) and was named Female Rock Artist of the Year at the PMPC Star Awards for Music.

== Early life and background ==
Glaiza Castro Galura was born on January 21, 1988, in Valenzuela, Metro Manila, to Cristina "Cristy" Galura and Alfred "Boy" Galura. Her father was a band member, while her mother was a contestant in the original iteration of the singing competition Tawag ng Tanghalan. In the early 1980s, they formed a band called The Alcris Duet. De Castro has a younger brother, Alchris Galura, who was recognized as Best Supporting Actor by the World Class Excellence Japan Awards (WCEJA) for his role in the drama series Abot-Kamay na Pangarap. Her uncle is Dan Alvaro, who has starred in action films.

De Castro studied at a Catholic private institution in Valenzuela. At age 12, she was discovered by a talent agent during a shoot in Valenzuela. Around the same time, she appeared in a fast food commercial. On January 27, 2001, de Castro made her entry into GMA Network, debuting on the television variety show Master Showman and subsequently becoming one of its regulars.

== Acting career ==
=== Early career: minor roles on television and in film (2001–2006) ===
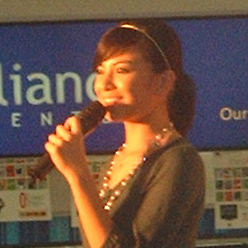
De Castro at a Regal Entertainment event held at SM Valenzuela on December 16, 2006

In 2001, de Castro began her acting career with a guest appearance in the television show Kasangga. Her first film appearance was around the same time in Cool Dudes 24/7, receiving one of its minor roles after having been unintentionally sent a text message for an audition. During this period, she would play further minor roles, including in the soap opera Ikaw Lang ang Mamahalin (2001), the horror-comedy film Singsing ni Lola (2002), the youth-oriented show Berks (2002–2004), the television series Ikaw ang Lahat sa Akin (2005) and the independent film Miss-Pinoy (2005).

By 2006, she began to appear in films more frequently, with minor parts in the horror films Sukob and White Lady and the Manny Pacquiao biographical film Pacquiao: The Movie. One of the most prominent roles during this point in her career was in the film adaptation of Carlo Vergara's graphic novel, Zsazsa Zaturnnah; the film was an entry to the 2006 Metro Manila Film Festival.

Also in 2006, de Castro played Honey on the GMA Network fantasy-adventure series Fantastikids, where she starred alongside Marky Cielo, Jackie Rice, and Ryza Cenon, as well as former child star Paolo Contis and former beauty queen Melanie Marquez. The reception to the show was positive; journalist Paul Daza of The Philippine Daily Inquirer compared it favorably to its counterpart on ABS-CBN, the fantasy-drama anthology Komiks, and commented that based on ratings, "it would seem like the new [GMA-7] stars are outshining the more established [ABS-CBN] performers."

=== Breakout roles (2007–2008) ===
In 2007, de Castro appeared in two television series. The first was the afternoon teen drama Boys Nxt Door, dubbed into Malay on the Malaysian channel 8TV and aired in South Korea via KBS2, becoming the first Filipino drama to air in the country. The second was the action-adventure series Asian Treasures. De Castro played Clara, an expert on history and geography who would use this knowledge to help the main characters find the titular treasures.

In 2007, she starred in the independent film Still Life, written and directed by Katski Flores. The film is about an artist diagnosed with a terminal illness who has traveled to an isolated island to paint his last work. De Castro played Emma, a woman who relates her past to the main character. Film critic Tito Valiente of Business Mirror noted her portrayal of Emma as "one reason the short life on that island becomes very real." Valiente noted that de Castro's character was "vulnerable but not whiny. Even in tears she conjures an image of a woman whose only way out of life is finding life in anything." The film was a finalist at that year's Cinemalaya Philippine Independent Film Festival, where de Castro received a Golden Screen Awards nomination in the Best Actress category. That same year, she also played a supporting role in the romantic film Batanes: Sa Dulo ng Walang Hanggan alongside Iza Calzado, Taiwanese singer-actor Ken Chu, and Marky Cielo.

In 2008, she started shooting another independent film, Rakenrol, based on director Quark Henares' views on growing up in the local rock scene and his personal experiences starting a band. De Castro described the film, which was still in production as of March 2009, as "a lighter version of Almost Famous" and "a fun, feel-good movie."

In 2008, she played the lead role in the television adaptation of the 1991 film Kaputol ng Isang Awit. In the series, de Castro played Sarah Monteza, a poor girl with a good voice but low self-esteem. De Castro would later say that the role was her "biggest break" thus far.

=== Career resurgence (2009–present) ===
After another supporting role in the television adaptation of comic-book writer Carlo J. Caparas' graphic novel Gagambino, de Castro once again landed a lead role in another television adaptation of a Filipino film, Kung Aagawin Mo ang Lahat sa Akin, opposite Patrick Garcia, Maxene Magalona, Jackie Rice, and JC Tiuseco. In the series, she played Gladys Andrada (a role originated by co-star Jackie Lou Blanco), the jealous only biological child of Gilbert (played by Nonie Buencamino) and Clara Andrada (played by Blanco). Regarding her portrayal, columnist Jason John Lim commented that while she knew she was breaking out of her comfort zone, "What she didn't know that she would also begin breaking the expectations of everybody."

Right after Kung Aagawin Mo ang Lahat sa Akin, she played another supporting role on an episode of the drama anthology SRO Cinemaserye, which chronicled the life story of singer Eva Castillo (portrayed in this episode by Manilyn Reynes). Shortly after, she landed another role in the Philippine remake of the Korean television series Stairway to Heaven alongside Dingdong Dantes, Rhian Ramos, and TJ Trinidad. De Castro portrayed Eunice, the counterpart of Han Yoori (played by Kim Tae-hee). De Castro watched the original series to attempt to get an idea of who her character was as a person in preparation for the role. She also commented on the relative complexity of her character in this series compared to her character in Kung Aagawin Mo Ang Lahat Sa Akin: "Unlike my previous role, you don't know what is going on inside the mind of Eunice. What's going inside her head is really devious. She is subtle in her approach and very scheming... Despite being evil, she still has a heart and there's a reason she became a bad person. If she is stepping down on people, she is also being stepped on by other people. She also has to fulfill her needs and wants and she will do everything for the person she loves." Critics received her portrayal well; Jerry Donato of The Philippine Star, in particular, said, "So far, Glaiza has given her Korean counterpart a run for her money."

In 2009, de Castro appeared in five films. The first was the independent political thriller Bente, where she replaced former StarStruck contestant and fellow GMA actress Jewel Mische when the latter refused to film a sex scene she considered "beyond [her] moral standards" as directed by Mel Chionglo. The film was released in June 2009 and received mixed reviews, with Rito Asilo of the Philippine Daily Inquirer citing its thematic substance and Gomez's and Calzado's "insightful performances" while also going on to blast the film's "disparate stories," "incohesive feel and style," and sudden ending "in a convenient anticlimax."

The second film was the horror movie Tarot, released on August 26. The film, directed by Jun Lana and top-billed by Marian Rivera and Dennis Trillo, is about a girl who can predict the future using tarot cards.

A third film, Ang Manghuhula, was released commercially in September (it had been shown at the Cinemanila International Film Festival the previous year). The film, directed by Paolo Herras, saw de Castro play the daughter of Messina (Eula Valdez), a seer. The production was received warmly, with Noelani Torre of the Philippine Daily Inquirer noting its "fascinating subject matter," "colorful cast," and "visual richness and clarity."

The fourth film de Castro starred in 2009 was the independently produced Astig (international title: Squalor) alongside Sid Lucero, Edgar Allan Guzman, Arnold Reyes, and Dennis Trillo (who also served as director). In Astig, de Castro played Elgine, a teenager afflicted with a sexually transmitted disease who eventually becomes the love interest of Trillo's character. Released in July of that year, it was a critical and financial success, topping the box office of that year's Cinemalaya Film Festival with a profit of ₱137,890.00. Darwin Chiong of GMA News called the film's cinematography "remarkable" and praised the cast as a whole, saying, "The movie gathers an ensemble of actors that deliver in the acting department, even those in supporting roles like Glaiza de Castro and Malou Crisologo." Her performance in this film earned her a Best Supporting Actress nomination at the 33rd Gawad Urian Awards.

The fifth film was the sixth installment of the Mano Po franchise, subtitled A Mother's Love. The film, directed by Joel Lamangan and top-billed by Sharon Cuneta, Zsa Zsa Padilla, Heart Evangelista, and Dennis Trillo, saw de Castro play the younger version of Cuneta's character, Melinda Uy. The film was released on December 25 and was an entry to that year's annual Metro Manila Film Festival.

Her first project on GMA for 2010 was in another villain role in Diva, billed as the Philippines' first musical comedy-drama series. It debuted on GMA Network on March 1, 2010, and ended on July 30, 2010. The show, which also starred Regine Velasquez, Mark Anthony Fernandez, TJ Trinidad, and singer Jaya, and is partly based on the American movie trilogy High School Musical and the American television series Glee, saw de Castro playing the ambitious Tiffany, who is Lady's (Rufa Mae Quinto) assistant and soon-to-be a villainess to singer-actress Regine Velasquez's heroine Melody.

After Diva, de Castro auditioned for and won the title role on the primetime fantasy series Grazilda. The show, a sequel to the Cinderella story, centers on Grazilda, who is, in turn, based on one of Cinderella's wicked stepsisters, Drizella. The plot revolves around Grazilda's banishment from her home world of Fantasia to the human world, where she suffers a fate similar to Cinderella's. The series, which premiered on September 13, 2010, also stars Geoff Eigenmann, Yasmien Kurdi, Jolina Magdangal, and Cherie Gil and marks de Castro's first lead role in a primetime series. Before the show's debut, de Castro said she could not believe her success; she had become accustomed to playing villainous roles and expected to do so for the remainder of her career. The show was a critical and commercial success, beating its rival, 1DOL, by five points in the AGB Mega Manila ratings. In light of the show's success, de Castro's manager, Manny Valera, has decided to turn down any further villain roles on behalf of his talent to build her up as a lead star.

On October 30, it was announced that de Castro would no longer be cast in the remake of the film Temptation Island and would instead be the lead star in the 2011 remake of the 1992 film Aswang, produced by Regal Films with film director Topel Lee. However, her lead role instead went to Lovi Poe. De Castro later played Binayaan in the epic drama Amaya, opposite Marian Rivera and Sid Lucero.

In 2012, de Castro appeared on the sitcom Tweets for My Sweet. In the third quarter of the year, she was chosen to play the role of Heidi Fernandez, which was originally intended for Alessandra de Rossi, in the Philippine adaptation of Temptation of Wife.

In 2013, de Castro co-starred in Vampire ang Daddy Ko, top-billed by Vic Sotto and Oyo Boy Sotto.

In 2015, de Castro played Althea Guevarra in the lesbian series The Rich Man's Daughter alongside Rhian Ramos.

In 2016, she played Pirena in the television drama fantasy series Encantadia. In 2017, she reprised the role in the series Mulawin vs. Ravena.

In 2018, she took on the title role in the revenge series Contessa.

== Music career ==
De Castro has released four albums so far. Her debut album, Magbalik Ka, was released in 2001 under XAX Music Entertainment. It contains six tracks described by the record label as "catchy bubblegum pop tunes."

In 2006, she released her second album, the self-titled Glaiza, under Dyna Records, which was officially launched in 2008. The eleven-track album, in production from December 2005, was described by de Castro herself as "more defined" compared to her first album, comprises pop and R&B songs and contains original content except for three tracks: a cover of Joey Albert's song "How Can I Make You See", a Tagalog version titled "Paano" and an English version of Dingdong Avanzado's "Basta't Kasama Kita", titled "As Long As I Am With You". When asked why it took her five years to release a second album, de Castro explained that after the first album's completion, she did not renew her contract with the record company and instead focused on her television career.

On April 18, 2015, de Castro released her third album, Synthesis, under Jay R's record label Homeworkz Music. Described by de Castro herself as indie and a mixture of pop and rock, the self-produced album has eight tracks. Additionally, of these tracks, "Barcelona" and "Waiting Shed" were written by Angelica Panganiban. Amidst the album's success, coming third in nationwide records sales in May 2015 and topping the iTunes Philippines charts as well as having been certified gold by the Philippine Association of the Record Industry (PARI) on September 29, de Castro held her first-ever major concert named "Dreams Never End" on October 3 at the Music Museum in San Juan, Metro Manila, alongside Regine Velasquez, Ice Seguerra, Kitchie Nadal, Rhian Ramos and Jay R; concert tickets sold out rapidly. De Castro subsequently performed at venues in Singapore, Japan and Canada to promote the album. She went on to be awarded Female Rock Artist of the Year at the 7th PMPC Star Awards for Music in 2015 while the track "Dusk 'Til Dawn" would be nominated for Best Rock/Alternative Recording at the 29th Awit Awards in 2016.

In 2017, she released her fourth album, Magandang Simulain, under PolyEast Records, containing eight tracks. Four of these tracks are covers of OPM classics, which include "Itanong Mo Sa Mga Bata" (originally by Asin), "Dukha" (originally by Aegis), "Bato sa Buhangin" (originally by Cinderella) and "Ang Himig Natin" (originally by the Juan de la Cruz Band). After having written two tracks in de Castro's previous album, Angelica Panganiban provided the lyrics for "Ganti", "London" and "Sinta" (which earned de Castro a Female Recording Artist of the Year nomination at the 10th PMPC Star Awards for Music held in 2018). The remaining track, "Magandang Simulain", was written by de Castro, dedicating it to her then-recently-deceased grandfather. The album topped the iTunes Philippines Top 100 albums chart in May 2017. On October 27, de Castro held a concert at the Music Museum, titled "kun[g]diman", to promote the album, with Mike Hanopol and Gloc-9 in attendance.

De Castro received critical acclaim for her acting and singing performance when she played anti-dictatorship activist Cecilia Flores-Oebanda in the 2018 film Liway; this includes her in-character covers of the Asin songs "Himig ng Pag-ibig" and "Pagbabalik".

De Castro has also provided the soundtracks to the television shows The Rich Man's Daughter, Contessa and Pamana: Saving Our Heritage as well as a cover of the Cinderella song "Bato sa Buhangin" for the film Goyo: Ang Batang Heneral alongside Ben&Ben member Miguel Benjamin.

== Public image ==
Despite gaining wider recognition for her roles as a villain in Kung Aagawin Mo Ang Lahat Sa Akin and Stairway to Heaven, de Castro has reportedly had qualms about portraying a villain again, commenting, "I don't want to be typecast as an antagonist forever because it's difficult to get rid of that sort of image." However, she has preferred antagonist roles over "sexy" roles. She later retracted this statement, saying that she "didn't think [she'd] get typecast because [she] plays different kinds of women each time" and explained this by saying, "The stories are different, so [her] characters' [motivations] are also different."

Although De Castro considered posing for magazines such as FHM "for instant fame and fortune," she eventually decided against it, instead opting to develop her skills as a serious actress, saying, "I just want to start on the right foot by focusing more on acting than diverting my attention to other interests. I want to become an actress and to show what I can do." She has also expressed interest in playing "out-of-the-box and extreme roles," such as Natalie Portman in V for Vendetta and Charlize Theron in Monster. In 2008, she spoke of her preference for independent film, commenting in Taglish, "As for me, I feel fulfilled in indie films. I'm given roles in indie projects that are heavier compared to the mainstream. And I'm rarely offered roles in mainstream [films] anyway."

=== Advocacy and political positions ===
In March 2016, de Castro participated in the UN Women Safe Cities Program, a program aiming to increase awareness and stop street harassment and sexual violence against women in public spaces. As part of the program, de Castro participated in Quezon City's campaign against sexual harassment.

De Castro is known as a women's rights and protection advocate.

After performing the role of anti-Marcos activist Cecilia Flores-Oebanda in 2018, de Castro has spoken against historical negationism regarding the Philippines' martial law era, which was the film's setting. She agreed it was a polarizing topic but said that Filipino youth must be "made more aware of it, because it's important to know history and learn from it. It's necessary for everyone's growth." In 2020, de Castro participated in activities denouncing the then-newly signed Anti-Terrorism Act of 2020, joining numerous artists in reciting Charlie Chaplin's final speech in the film The Great Dictator, translated into Filipino by writer Rody Vera.

=== Other ventures ===
In the mid-2010s, de Castro started to be involved as an entrepreneur, being the owner of the Valenzuela-based talent agency Galura Studio and a part-owner of the restaurant Runner's Kitchen in Quezon City.

In February 2023, de Castro and her husband David Rainey opened a café, Brewbox, in Baler, Aurora. This was followed a month later in March by a bed and breakfast named Casa Galura.

== Personal life ==
De Castro maintained a close friendship with consistent on-screen partner Marky Cielo for much of his career until his death in 2008. De Castro was in a relationship with Irish businessman David Rainey since 2018, after first meeting in Siargao. They became engaged in December 2020, and married in Dunluce Castle in Northern Ireland in October 2021. On January 23, 2023, they had a second wedding ceremony in Botolan, Zambales. In September 2026, de Castro announced that she and Rainey were expecting their first child.

De Castro was raised as a Christian and identifies as born again.

== Acting credits and awards ==
Some of de Castro's notable roles include the titular character in Grazilda (2010–2011), Althea Guevarra in The Rich Man's Daughter (2015) and Sang'gre Pirena in Encantadia (2016–2017), which she later reprised in Encantadia Chronicles: Sang'gre (2025–2026). For her acting work in Contessa (2018), she has received awards from the Alta Media Icon Awards, Box Office Entertainment Awards and EdukCircle Awards. For her portrayal of Cecilia "Liway" Flores-Oebanda in Liway (2018), de Castro won awards from the GEMS Hiyas ng Sining Awards, Luna Awards, Platinum Stallion Media Awards and Facine Film Festival in addition to nominations from the FAMAS Awards and Gawad Urian Awards.

== Discography ==
=== Albums ===
List of studio albums, with sales figures and certifications
Title	Album details	Sales	Certifications	Ref(s)
Magbalik Ka	Released: 2001; Label: XAX Music Entertainment; Formats: CD	—N/a	—N/a	
Glaiza	Released: 2006; Label: Dyna Music; Formats: CD	—N/a	—N/a	
Synthesis	Released: 2015; Label: Homeworkz Services; Formats: CD, digital download, streaming	PHL: 7,500^{*}	PARI: Gold	
Magandang Simulain	Released: 2017; Label: PolyEast Records; Formats: CD, digital download, streaming	—N/a	—N/a	
* Sales figures based on certification alone.

=== Singles ===
==== As lead artist ====
List of singles as lead artist, showing year released and originating album
Title	Year	Album	Ref(s)
"Christmas Medley"	2005	Non-album single	
"Sinta"	2017	Magandang Simulain	
"Bato sa Buhangin" (featuring Miguel Benjamin of Ben&Ben)	2018	Magandang Simulain	
"Kapalaran" (featuring Juan Miguel Severo)	2019	Non-album singles	
"Bank Holiday"	2021	Non-album singles	
"Tawid Dagat" (with Max Importunate)	2022	Non-album singles	

==== As featured artist ====
List of singles as featured artist, showing year released and originating album
Title	Year	Album	Ref(s)
"Christmas Medley (Medley)" (17:28 featuring Glaiza de Castro)	2010	Non-album singles	
"Have Yourself a Merry Christmas" (17:28 featuring Glaiza de Castro)	2011	Non-album singles	
"Dading" (Janno Gibbs featuring Glaiza de Castro)	2014	Novela	
"Bugso ng Damdamin" (Bendeatha featuring Serpientes and Glaiza de Castro)	2016	Musika ng Masa	

==== Soundtrack appearances ====
List of media in which Glaiza de Castro's songs have been used
Year	Film/series	Song(s)	Ref(s)
2008	Kaputol ng Isang Awit	"Nais Ko" with Lovi Poe	
2010	Grazilda	"Kapalaran"	
2010	Grazilda	"Nahuhulog Sa'Yo"	
2012	Madaling Araw Mahabang Gabi	"Barcelona"	
2012	Madaling Araw Mahabang Gabi	"Dusk til Dawn"	
2014	Dading	"Dading" Janno Gibbs featuring Glaiza de Castro	
2015	The Rich Man's Daughter	"Till It's Time"	
2018	Contessa	"Dito Sa Aking Mundo"	
2018	Goyo: Ang Batang Heneral	"Bato Sa Buhangin" featuring Miguel Benjamin of Ben&Ben	
2019	Pamana: Saving Our Heritage	"Pamana"	
2022	False Positive	"Iyo Hanggang Dulo" with Xian Lim	
2022	Running Man Philippines	"Running Man" with various artists	
