= List of Marimar (2007 TV series) characters =

This is a List of Marimar characters from the Marimar (2007 TV series), a Filipino drama television series created by Inés Rodena, developed by Dode Cruz and produced by GMA Network. The series premiered on August 13, 2007, on the network's prime time block and worldwide via GMA Pinoy TV. The series concluded on March 19, 2008, with a total of 155 episodes. The lead stars are Marian Rivera and Dingdong Dantes, and the villain Katrina Halili.

== Main characters ==
=== Marimar Perez-Santibañez / Bella Aldama / Marimar Aldama-Santibañez ===
Portrayed by Marian Rivera. Marimar is simple and innocent and was Angelika's former best friend. Her adoptive grandparents raised her well. Her life was happy until she met Sergio, the man who changed her life. She married Sergio but his jealous stepmother and arrogant father made Marimar's life miserable as hell. She was framed up and was shot by a gun but was able survived until she met a rich businessman and she agrees to work as a maid in Aldama Mansion and changed her name to Bella. Esperanza, the cruel and violent sister of Gustavo made Marimar's life in the mansion a living hell like what Sergio's stepmother did to Marimar. However, later, when Esperanza and Marimar became friends, another evil being named Natalia had stepped in the house of Aldama where she pretends the long lost daughter of Gustavo, however Esperanza is suspicious on her identity and didn't like her because of her cruel and bratty attitude, until Bella remembers that she is the real daughter of Gustavo, this made Natalia to become more evil and murderous as she hostages her and Cruzita until she got shot by the authorities. Gustavo died because of this incident and after few years, the simple Marimar turns into a heartless and scheming woman. She even planned to fool Angelika, Renato, and Sergio. The mosf famous scene is where Marimar made Angelika get the key in the mud by using her mouth and kicking her out like what Angelika did to her before. But Angelika will not let Marimar fool her again so she will stop at nothing to make her dead. In the finale, she survived all the latter's evil deeds and lived happily ever after. She is the main protagonist of the series.

=== Sergio Santibanez ===
Portrayed by Dingdong Dantes. A handsome and rich but a certified playboy. He uses Marimar and marries her to make his stepmother jealous. He goes to Macau to pursue his dream of becoming a professional racer, unfortunately he was clueless about Angelika's manipulation and ruthless torture to Marimar. After he heard the news of Marimar's death, he was devastated and dumped Kim. He attended a party and was shocked to see a girl named Bella Aldama's face and personality as well. He started to stalk Bella and will not stop to search the latter's identity. Until, the merciless Bella said the truth that she is Marimar and will stop at nothing to accomplish her revenge plans. At first Bella orders Innocencia to take Cruzita away from Sergio but was soon enough, Sergio and Marimar patched up things.

After Angelika, surrenders the things that killed Esperanza and frames Marimar again, Sergio helped her escape the cops and in the end after his jealous stepmother's death, he married Marimar again and lived happy with his family.

=== Angelika Santibañez ===
Portrayed by Katrina Halili. Angelika is the jealous stepmother of Sergio and the prime villainess character in the story. A tragic woman who was raised by her drunkard adoptive father. At first, she and Marimar are best friends but after they got into an accident, Marimar promises Angelika to call help and leaves her but she was clueless that Marimar returns to help her and after seeing her scars she blames her. After a few years, she and Sergio are almost getting married but she left him to marry Sergio's father because she knows that the latter's father is rich. This made Sergio to make her jealous when he proposes to Marimar. This made Angelika more vindictive and ruthless with no heart and soul. When Segio goes to Macau, she made Marimar's life in the resort a living hell with the help of Monica and Perfecta. Angelike becomes murderous as she is willing to kill her enemies. She framed Marimar as a thief and orders Natalia and Nicandro to burn Marimar's adoptive grandparents house. And the most famous and powerful scene is where Angelika orders the pregnant Marimar to get the bracelet in the mud with the use of her mouth and then kicks her out in the resort. Then, Angelika shot Marimar with a gun in her back but the latter was able to survived due to the amulet she wears. Marimar goes to her adoptive grandparents grave and swears that she will get revenge to those who made her life miserable. Angelika continues to reign in the resort like an "evil queen", she even turns her husband (Renato) into a psycho as revenge because Renato always being violent with her. Angelika got her karma when Marimar now Bella buys the resort and kicks her out in the resort like what she did before. Can't accept her fate, she continues to make plans to her. She loses money when she played in the casino.

Her diabolicalness is purely undesirable as when she met her real mother, she eventually killed her to take her money and uses it to get revenge at Marimar. Angelika confirmed that she is also Aldama and will not stop until she gets Marimar's trust again. After she planned to make Rodrigo shot her in her back, she gain Marimar's trust and continues her evil plan. She first blackmail and killed Esperanza (the former cruel aunt of Marimar), and frames up her again. After that, Marimar tells her that she wants see her, the two see each other in a cultural center then Angelika shows her gun and fires her many times, then Angelika confess all her evil deeds she did to her like when she orders Nicandro and Natalia to burn the house of her adoptive grandparents, and when she killed her own mother, Innocencia and Esperanza, then the authorities showed up and attempt to escape them, she and Marimar had a catfight but was able to knock her down, she drives a car and hit Marimar. Her car was shot by the police and was arrested. She was sent to a hospital along with Marimar, Monica betrays her and injects syringe to her to get blood to save Marimar which made Angelika woke up and turns into a berserk beast who attacks Monica. Now the court hearing said that she is guilty with several crimes such as parricide, attempted murder, kidnapping, and more as she was sentenced to life imprisonment or reclusión perpetua. Renato orders the female inmates to bully and bruise Angelika. After she teams up and created a plan with her violent adoptive father to escape the jail and kidnap Sergio and Cruzita which she succeeded. She planned to kill them all including Marimar but failed when she got her hand cut off and rides a helicopter, she was kicked by Marimar and fell, and got dragged into a pond, where she was eaten by a group of crocodiles, serving that as her ultimate fate.

=== Renato Santibanez ===
Portrayed by Richard Gomez. He is the arrogant and violent father of Sergio who married Angelika. Later on, he collaborated with Sergio and Marimar to bring down Angelika.

== Notable Characters ==
- Jestoni Alarcon as Gustavo Aldama - The good and wealthy father of Marimar and Angelika.
- Rita Avila as Lupita Aldama - The mother of Marimar.
- Franchesca Salcedo as Cruzita Aldama - Sergio and Marimar's daughter.
- Boboy Garovillo as Padre Porres - The priest friend of Marimar.
- Leo Martinez as Pancho Perez - The adoptive grandfather of Marimar who was killed by Natalia, Nicandro, and Angelika.
- Caridad Sanchez as Cruz Perez - The adoptive grandmother of Marimar who was killed by Natalia, Nicandro, and Angelika.
- Bing Loyzaga as Esperanza Aldama - The supportive cousin of Gustavo Aldama and became the guardian and supportive aunt of Marimar upon Gustavo's passing. She was killed by Angelika.
- Michael V. as Fulgoso's voice - Marimar's dog's voice.
- Nigel as Fulgoso - Marimar's dog.
- Manilyn Reynes as Corazon - Marimar's friend in Villa Santibañez, and later on, the nanny of Cruzita Aldama-Santibañez.
- Gabby Eigenmann as Nicandro Mejia - Angelika's right hand in Villa Santibañez who killed Marimar's adoptive grandparents.
- Sheena Halili as Monica - The dimwitted friend of Angelika. At first she hated Marimar and was glad that she died but in the end after learning Angelika's betrayal, she sides with Marimar.
- Arthur Solinap as Diego - The husband of Monica. He saved Renato and Marimar from being killed by Angelika.
- Bianca King as Natalia Montenegro - A worker in Villa Santibañez who was very jealous at Marimar. Her jealousy leads her to kill Marimar's adoptive grandparents. After that, she pretended to be Marimar, the long lost daughter of Gustavo Aldama. She was killed by the authorities when she held Marimar hostage and tried to kill baby Cruzita when her deception was discovered by Gustavo.
- Marky Lopez as Arturo - Sergio's driver and best friend. He has a crush in Sergio before.
- Dino Guevarra as Antonio - Sergio's business partner and trusted friend.
- Rufa Mae Quinto as Fifi's voice
- Nadine Samonte as Innocencia Arcega - Angelika's cousin who needs money to cure her mother's illness. Innocencia agrees to seduce Sergio to make Marimar jealous. After her face was scarred because of Angelika's madness, she became Marimar's friend and helps her to get revenge at Angelika. She was killed by Señora Angelika's henchman when she found out that Angelika is the one who killed Tia Esperanza.
- Mike Tan as Choi - Worker in Villa Santibañez. He later develops a crush for Marimar.
- Mel Kimura as Perfecta - Maid in Villa Santibañez. Perfecta, Monica, and Angelika will make the life of Marimar miserable as hell.

== Other characters ==
- Arthur Solinap as Diego – Monica's Husband. He doesn't like Monica's friendship with Angelika. He later aids Sergio and Marimar.
- Marvin Agustin as Rodolfo San Jinez – Marimar's ex fiancé. He only wants to marry Marimar for her money since his company is losing money. Later he is arrested after Sergio saved Bella from him.
- Francheska Salcedo as Cruzita Aldama–Santibañez – Daughter of Marimar and Sergio Santibañez. She tries to hook up Marimar and Sergio again.
- Dino Guevarra as Antonio – Sergio's friend. He has a crush on Innocencia.
- Carmina Villarroel as Dra. Rhia Concepcion – Renato's friend. She is the ex fiancée of Dr. Hayden.
- Lani Mercado as Vanessa Mae Cruz – Angelika's mother who revealed that she had a relationship with Gustavo Aldama. Angelika kills her although she also had cancer.
- Hayden Kho as Dr. Hayden Miranda – Dra. Rhia's ex fiancé.
- Paolo Paraiso as Carlitos Solis – Angelika's ally and bodyguard. Shot to death after he almost exposed Angelika's evil schemes.
- Shermaine Santiago as Brenda – one of Bella Aldama/Marimar's staff who worked for the Aldamas
- Victor Aliwalas as Atty. Adrian Alasco – Marimar's friend. He is one of the guys Sergio gets jealous of since he aids Marimar on earning her company back. He later became friends with Sergio and he arranges a legal marriage contract for both Marimar and Sergio towards the finale of this series.
- K Brosas as Rowena – Marimar's secretary. She is another ally of Angelika.
- Pocholo Montes as Inspector Vitug
- Raquel Montessa as Leonor Arcega – Mother of Innocencia. She tries to talk Innocencia out of her love for Sergio since she already knows Sergio loves Marimar.
- Joseph Ison as Rodrigo – One of the bodyguards to the Aldamas who revealed to be a spy for Angelika. Killed by Nicandro.
- Mike Gayoso as Angelika's bodyguard
- Jaime Fabregas as Don Augusto Aldama - He is against Lupita and Gustavo's relationship.
- Cristine Reyes as Kim Chan – Sergio's evil and obsessed ex-girlfriend who wants him and wants to make Marimar and Angelika's lives miserable but she back out.
- Irma Adlawan as Selva
- Soliman Cruz as Berto
- Bruno Folster as Bruno
- Gwen Garci as Olga
- Ailyn Luna as Cecilla
- Jan Marini as DSWD Officer
- Joanne Quintas as Jemma
- Ronnie Lazaro as Jose – Angelika's father-figurecrew
- Nicole Dulalia as Young Angelika
- Ella Cruz as Young MariMar
