= Don Michael Perez =

Filipino screenwriter and director

Don Michael Perez is a Filipino television writer, film writer, television director, film and television director. He is a resident writer and director for GMA Network.

His most famous works were Mulawin, Destiny Rose and Kambal, Karibal.

== Filmography ==
=== Film ===
==== As screenwriter ====
Year	Title	Notes	Ref.
2004	Kuya		
2005	Mulawin: The Movie		
2006	White Lady		

==== As director ====
Year	Title	Notes	Ref.
2009	Shake, Rattle & Roll XI	"Ukay-Ukay" segment	

=== Television ===
==== As director ====
Year	Title	Notes	Ref.
2007–2008	Zaido: Pulis Pangkalawakan	Also head writer	
2008	Dyesebel		
2008–2009	Gagambino		
2009	Totoy Bato		
2009–2010	Darna		
2010	Trudis Liit		
2014	Kambal Sirena	14 episodes	

- 1999 Pintados (as developer)
- 1999 Click (as head writer, developer)
- 2002–2003 Kahit Kailan (as creator)
- 2003 Twin Hearts (as creator)
- 2004–2005 Mulawin (as creator, head writer)
- 2005 Mukha (as developer)
- 2005 Darna (as creative consultant)
- 2005 Ganti (as developer)
- 2005–2006 Agos (as developer)
- 2006 Tinig (as developer)
- 2006 Majika (as creative consultant)
- 2006–2007 Captain Barbell (as head writer)
- 2006 Duyan (as developer)
- 2006 Linlang (as developer)
- 2006 Dangal (as developer)
- 2007 Asian Treasures (as head writer)
- 2007 Sinasamba Kita (as head writer)
- 2007–2008 MariMar (as creative consultant)
- 2007–2008 Zaido: Pulis Pangkalawakan (as head writer, co-director)
- 2007 Muli (as creator)
- 2008 Babangon Ako't Dudurugin Kita (as head writer)
- 2008 Gaano Kadalas ang Minsan (as developer)
- 2009 Dapat Ka Bang Mahalin? (as head writer)
- 2009 Zorro (as head writer)
- 2010 Diva (as developer)
- 2010–2011 Bantatay (as head director)
- 2011 Machete (as co-director)
- 2011 Sinner or Saint (as head director)
- 2011–2012 Daldalita (as head director)
- 2012 My Daddy Dearest (as head director)
- 2012–2013 Aso ni San Roque (as head director)
- 2013 Bukod Kang Pinagpala (as head director)
- 2013 Maghihintay Pa Rin (as head director)
- 2013 With a Smile (as head writer (episodes 1–7), creative consultant (episode 8-65))
- 2014 Innamorata (as head director)
- 2014–2015 Strawberry Lane (as head director)
- 2014–2015 Yagit (as additional co-director)
- 2015–2016 Destiny Rose (as head director)
- 2016 Once Again (as head director)
- 2016–2017 Hahamakin ang Lahat (as head director)
- 2017 Mulawin vs. Ravena (as creator, director)
- 2017–2018 Kambal, Karibal (as creator, director)
- 2018–2019 Cain at Abel (as co-director)
- 2020–2021 Love of My Life (as director)
- 2021 To Have & to Hold (as director)
- 2022 Little Princess (as director)
- 2022 Raising Mamay (as director)
- 2022 Return to Paradise (as director)
- 2023 Magandang Dilag (as director)
- TBA Muntik Nang Maabot Ang Langit (as director)

== Awards and nominations ==
Awards and nominations
Year	Award giving body	Category	Nominated work	Results
2006	Golden Screen Award	Best Adapted Screenplay	Mulawin: The Movie	Included
2009	Metro Manila Film Festival	Best Director	Shake Rattle & Roll XI	Included
