= Ayen Munji-Laurel =

Filipino actress

Maria Yllena Laurel
- Born: Maria Yllena Munji; November 21, 1971 (age 54); Manila, Philippines
- Occupation: Actress • singer
- Years active: 1989–present
- Spouses: Jefri Bolkiah (m. 1994; div. 2000) Franco Laurel (m. 2001)
- Children: 6

Maria Yllena Munji-Laurel, better known as Ayen Munji-Laurel (born November 21, 1971) is a Filipino actress and singer. Part of GMA Network from 2009, she transferred to ABS-CBN in late 2015; she later returned to GMA in 2022, where she appeared on Start-Up PH, the Philippine adaptation of the South Korean TV series Start Up.

Munji was previously married to Jefri Bolkiah, Prince of Brunei, with whom she had a son.

== Career ==
In 2007, she made her acting debut on GMA Network as a full-time actress in evening and primetime programs such as Amaya, co-starring Marian Rivera and an ensemble cast in 2011, 2012 as part of Hiram na Puso with Gina Alajar, Kris Bernal, and also Amaya co-star Gardo Versoza in the critically acclaimed series. She then later starred in the remake of the Korean turned Filipino adaptation of Temptation of Wife in 2012-2013 as Lady Armada with co-star Marian Rivera her second time in that same year. She had a short stint in the 2013 afternoon soap Maghihintay Pa Rin as Bianca King's protagonist mother in a short stint of the series she primarily exited out to star in the film Ang Huling Henya in the sci-fi comedy flick with award-winning comedian Rufa Mae Quinto. In 2014, she resumed her acting in primetime through the romantic-comedy family melodrama My Destiny. In 2015, she jumped to rival station, ABS-CBN, after doing Beautiful Strangers and appeared on various television dramas of the network in either villain or anti-hero roles. Later in 2022 She returned to her home network GMA Network after 7 years with ABS-CBN. And she is part of the Philippine adaptation of Start-Up PH.

== Discography ==
- 2002: Ayen
- 2004: Thankful

== Filmography ==
=== Television ===
Year	Title	Role	Notes
2009	Rosalinda	Berta Alvarez / Delia	
2011–2012	Amaya	Hara Lingayan	
2012	Hiram na Puso	Roxanne Saavedra	
2012–2013	Temptation of Wife	Yolanda Armada/Mrs. Valencia	
2013	Maghihintay Pa Rin	Catriona "Rio" De Villa	
2014	My Destiny	Ruth Perez	
2015	Second Chances	Norma Padilla	
2015	Beautiful Strangers	Lourdes De Jesus	
2016	Born for You	Margaret "Marge" Marquez-Sebastian	
2017	Ikaw Lang ang Iibigin	Victoria Quintana-Dela Vega	
2019	Sino ang May Sala?: Mea Culpa	Matilda Montelibano	
2022	Start-Up PH	Alice Cortez-Sison / Alice Cortez-Diaz	
2024	Can't Buy Me Love	Charry Tanhueco	
2025	Prinsesa ng City Jail	Leilani Bustamante	
2026	Never Say Die	Yvette Dizon-Limjoco	credited as Ayen Laurel

=== Films ===
Year	Title	Role	Notes
2010	Here Comes the Bride	Mom of Inaki	Support Role
2010	"SIGWA"	Support role	
2013	Ang Huling Henya	Miriam	Support Role
