= Maghihintay Pa Rin =

2013 Philippine television drama series

- Title card
- Also known as: Bitter Sweet Life
- Genre: Romantic drama
- Developed by: Dode Cruz
- Written by: Luningning Interio-Ribay; Geng Delgado
- Directed by: Don Michael Perez
- Creative director: Jun Lana
- Starring: Bianca King; Rafael Rosell; Dion Ignacio
- Theme music composer: Dingdong Avanzado
- Opening theme: "Maghihintay Sa'Yo" by Christian Bautista
- Country of origin: Philippines
- Original language: Tagalog
- No. of episodes: 79

Production
- Executive producer: Darling Pulido-Torres
- Production locations: Quezon City, Philippines; Singapore
- Cinematography: Carlo Montaño, Jr.
- Camera setup: Multiple-camera setup
- Running time: 30–45 minutes
- Production company: GMA Entertainment TV

Original release
- Network: GMA Network
- Release: June 10 – September 27, 2013

Maghihintay Pa Rin (transl. still waiting / international title: Bitter Sweet Life) is a 2013 Philippine television drama romance series broadcast by GMA Network. Directed by Don Michael Perez, it stars Bianca King, Rafael Rosell and Dion Ignacio. It premiered on June 10, 2013 on the network's Afternoon Prime line up. The series concluded on September 27, 2013, with a total of 79 episodes.

== Cast and characters ==
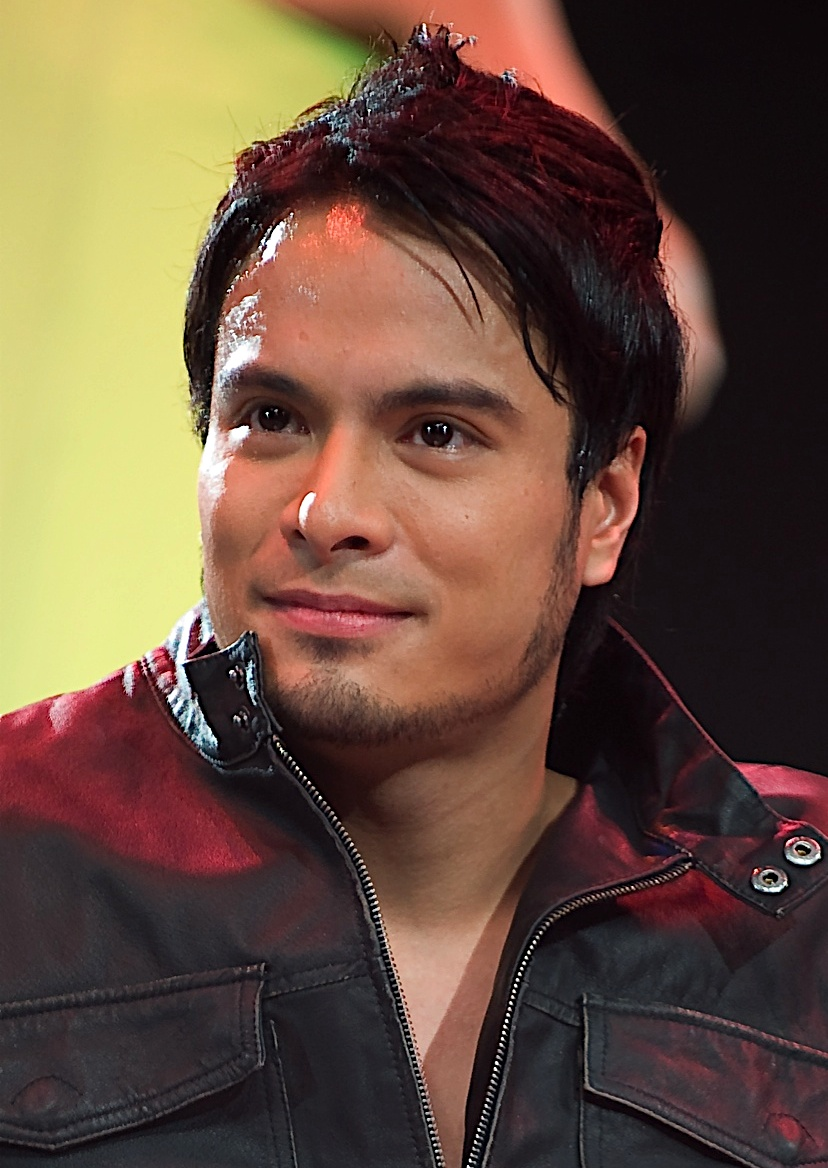
Rafael Rosell portrays Kiko Sebastian.

Lead cast

- Bianca King as Geneva "Gen" de Villa
- Rafael Rosell as Francisco "Kiko" Sebastian
- Dion Ignacio as Orlando "Orly" Ramirez

Supporting cast

- JC Tiuseco as Ricky Alvarado
- Tanya Gomez as Trinidad Sebastian
- Julie Lee as Grace Lim
- JM Reyes as Cholo Sebastian
- Daniella Amable as Lita Sebastian
- Sachi Manahan as Sebastian
- Diva Montelaba as Milan
- Lou Sison as Leni
- Bryan Pagala as Francisco "Franz" de Villa Sebastian Jr.
- Ynez Veneracion as Stella Ramirez
- Nathalie Hart as Yvette Chua-Villafuerte
- AJ Dee as Lance Villafuerte
- Ayen Munji-Laurel as Catriona "Rio" de Villa

== Development ==
Conceptualized by Richard Cruz and developed by Kit Villanueva-Langit, the project—which initially titled as Hindi Kita Iiwan was put on the fast track by the network for a second week of June 2013 premiere. On the mid-part of April 2013, a detailed breakdown of the script was released, containing information on the plot and characters which would be in the series. It also revealed the names of two of the three actors chosen for the lead roles. However, during the casting process of the show, several revisions were made.

=== Casting ===
Bianca King and Dion Ignacio were personally chosen by the network management to portray the lead characters and were the first two actors to be cast. King was signed on to play Geneva de Villa, a Richie-rich young lass "who will do everything in the name of love." King summarized her character as being intelligent, brave and compassionate – far from the usual "damsel in distress" roles she portrayed in her past projects.

== Production ==
Principal photography commenced in the middle of May 2013. Most of the scenes were shot on location in Quezon City. They also filmed scenes in Singapore. Filming locations were chosen by the series' director Don Michael Perez and by production designer Melvin Lacerna.

== Ratings ==
According to AGB Nielsen Philippines' Mega Manila household television ratings, the pilot episode of Maghihintay Pa Rin earned an 11.7% rating. The final episode scored a 14.4% rating.
