= Chanda Romero =

Filipino actress (born 1954)

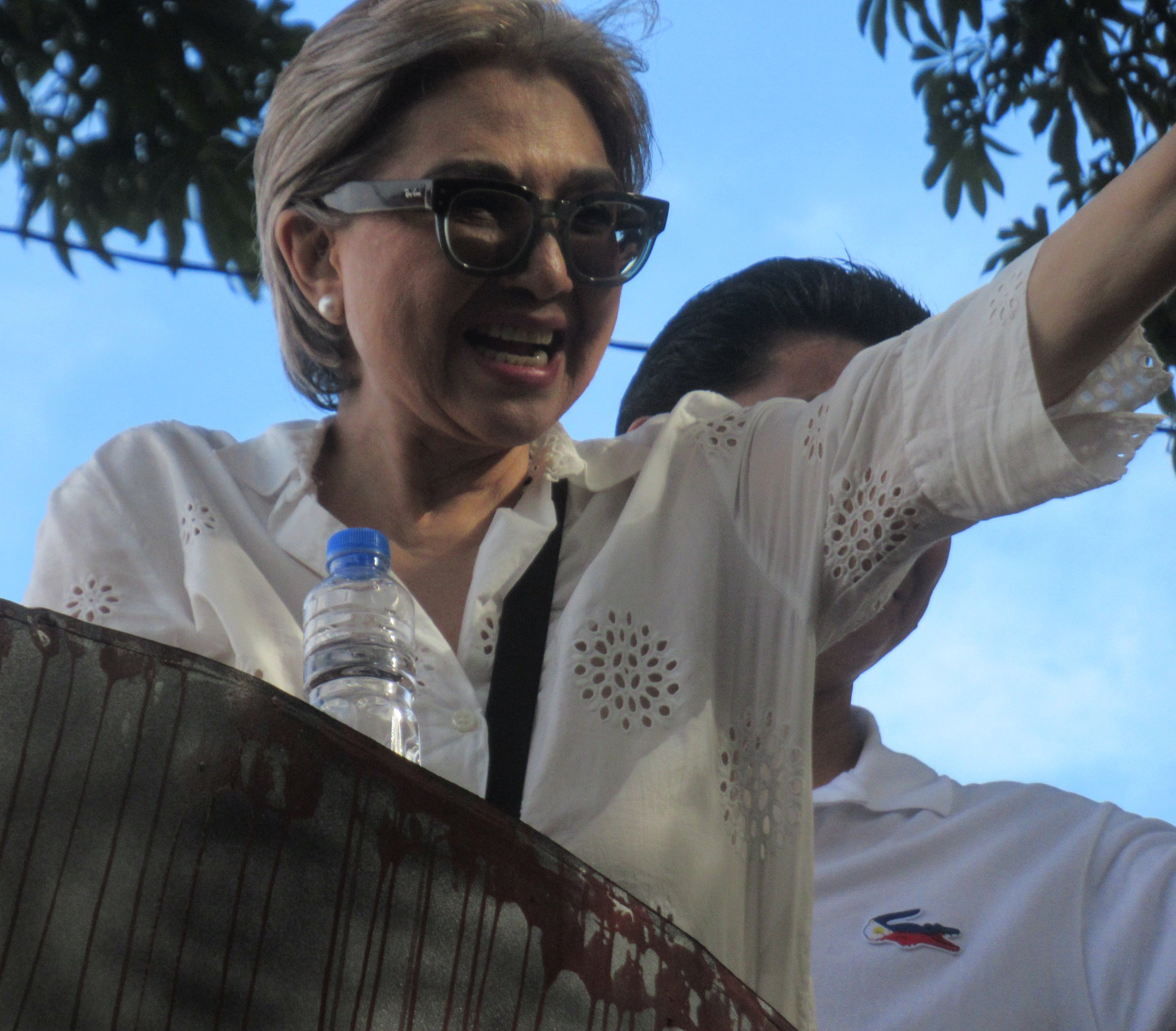
- Romero in 2024
- Born: María Josefa Romero y Valenzuela; February 26, 1954 (age 72); Cebu City, Philippines
- Occupations: Actress, Singer
- Years active: 1967–present
- Agent(s): Sparkle GMA Artist Center; Star Magic (2024–present)
- Known for: Working Girls, Contessa, Prima Donnas, Mananayaw, FPJ's Batang Quiapo
- Spouse: José Mári Alejandrino y Eusebio (m. 2013)
- Parents: Enrique Roberto Romero y Villanueva (father); María de los Remedios Valenzuela de la Victoria (mother)

Chanda Romero-Alejandrino (born February 26, 1954) is a Filipino actress. She started in 1967, and is still active today.

She first started in 1972 in the film Kundoktora with Vilma Santos, which was shown on the exact date of the declaration of Martial Law. During the 1970s, she became known as a sexy actress. Her prolific work in sexy films and dramas caught the attention of many directors, and in the 1980s, she showed her serious work as an actress in Ishmael Bernal's Working Girls and Dapat Ka Bang Mahalin? Both were released in 1984.

== Biography ==
Chanda Romero is the daughter of Enrique Romero, son of Francisco Exequiel Romero, Jr. and Gloria Villanueva y Baena of Negros Oriental, and Remedios Valenzuela, daughter of hispanofilipino Ramiro Valenzuela and Josefina de la Victoria y Burgos of Cebu.

== Career ==
In the 1970s and the 1980s, she had a staple of films in which she starred with award-winning actresses such as Elizabeth Oropesa, Hilda Koronel, Gloria Diaz and Daria Ramirez. As a result, she caught the attention of directors Celso Ad Castillo, Ishmael Bernal, Danny Zialcita and Lino Brocka. Her leading men include Philip Salvador, Eddie Garcia, Christopher de Leon, Dindo Fernando, Joel Torre, etc. In the 1990s, her work in television also brought her success. Shows such as Villa Quintana. She was also praised for her role in the 1997 movie Ligaya Ang Itawag Mo Sa Akin which was directed by Carlos Siguion-Reyna. Romero is a freelancer but does more projects in GMA Network. She has starred in ABS-CBN projects as well like the religious-centered drama series Kapalaran and the role of Vida Mojica in the Vietnamese-Filipino teleserye starring Maricel Soriano and John Estrada, Vietnam Rose. During 2012, she transferred to TV5 for the first time and became part of Kidlat as Minerva Megaton. In 2025, Romero became part of ABS-CBN's hit primetime action series FPJ's Batang Quiapo as one of the main villains as the scheming politician Olivia Guerrero-Torres.

== Personal life ==
She married Jose Mari "Mayi" Alejandrino on October 25, 2013. On May 17, 2014, Chanda and Mayi professed their vows in a commitment ceremony at the Tierra de Maria Chapel in Tagaytay.

Her mother died on July 6, 2020, as one of the casualties of COVID-19 in Cebu City.

Her father Enrique, also known as Bobby, was the paternal grandson of Francisco Domingo Romero Sr., presidente municipal of Tanjay, Negros Oriental from 1909 to 1916 and later a member of the Provincial Board of Negros Oriental, and Josefa Muñoz, daughter of Tanjay presidente municipal Don José Muñoz Teves and Alejandra Ines Calumpang . Her father was also the maternal grandson of Enrique Cayetano Villanueva, Sr., governor of Negros Oriental from 1916 to 1925 and later representative of the 2nd district of Negros Oriental from 1925 to 1931, and Francisca Baena Gómez, Negros Oriental Carnival Queen in 1905.

Other relations include her mother's sister Milagros Valenzuela de Urgello, Cebu Carnival Queen in 1937; her grandfather's brother José María Emeterio Romero, the first Philippine ambassador to the Court of St. James's and later Secretary of Education; Eddie Romero, National Artist for Film; Jose Romero, Jr., former Philippine ambassador to Italy; Hector R.R. Villanueva, Press Secretary of former Philippine President Fidel V. Ramos and later Postmaster-General of the Philippines during the Arroyo administration; among others.

== Filmography ==
Key
†	Denotes films or TV productions that have not yet been released

=== Film ===
Year	Title	Role
1967	Maruja	Aling Angie
1967	Ang Pangarap Ko'y Ikaw	
1967	All Over the World	
1967	Anong Ganda Mo!	
1967	Because of a Flower	Doña Ameila
1968	To Love Again	
1968	Buy One, and Take One	
1968	Doon Po sa Amin	
1968	Abdul Tapang	Analyn
1968	Summer Love	
1968	Tiririt ng Maya, Tiririt ng Ibon	
1968	Pablo S. Gomez' Triple	Brianna
1968	Ngitngit ng Pitong Whistle Bomb	
1974	Kundoktora	
1975	Alat!	
1976	Hindi Kami Damong Ligaw	
1977	Banta ng Kahapon	
1978	Mananayaw	
1978	Mercenario	
1979	Ang Agimat ni Pepe	
1979	Annie Batungbakal	
1980	Beach House	
1980	Aguila	Diwata
1980	Gabi ng Lagim Ngayon	
1980	The Last Reunion	Rita
1980	Taga ng Panahon	
1981	Kapitan Kidlat	
1981	Karma	Cristy
1982	My Only Love	Tiffany
1982	Batch '81	Jenny Estrada
1982	Gaano Kadalas ang Minsan?	Charley
1984	Bagets	Christine
1984	Dapat Ka Bang Mahalin?	Glacilda Gancayco
1984	Soltero	RJ Juan
1984	Working Girls	Anne
1984	Hindi Mo Ako Kayang Tapakan	Thelma
1985	Bituing Walang Ningning	Edith
1985	Bakit Manipis ang Ulap?	Jocelyn
1986	Yesterday, Today & Tomorrow	
1986	Sensual	
1986	Sobra Na... Tama Na... Asiong Aksaya!	
1986	Always & Forever	
1986	Agaw-Armas	Lucia
1987	Stolen Moments	
1987	Paano Kung Wala Ka Na	Connie
1987	Walang Karugtong ang Nakaraan	Tess
1987	Olongapo... The Great American Dream	Martha
1988	Rosa Mistica	Lucila
1988	Paano Tatakasan ang Bukas?	Paloma Aguilar
1988	Langit at Lupa	
1990	Kasalanan Bang Sambahin Ka?	Jenny
1993	Hindi Kita Malilimutan	Cita
1993	Inay	Prosecutor attorney
1994	Binibini ng Aking Panaginip	
1995	Campus Girls	Aling Pilar
1995	Bagong Bayani	Maga
1997	Ligaya ang Itawag Mo sa Akin	Lolay
2003	My First Romance	Josie
2004	Naglalayag	Maita
2005	Room Boy	
2007	Eddie Romero's Faces of Love	
2008	Love Me Again (Land Down Under)	Migo's mother
2009	When I Met U	Sylvia
2010	Rosario	Tenant
2014	Shake, Rattle & Roll XV	Aling Lina
2015	The Last Pinoy Action King	Herself
2022	Deception	
2023	Voltes V: Legacy – The Cinematic Experience	Contessa
2024	Espantaho	Adele
2025	Call Me Mother	Mutya Sidro

=== Television / digital series ===
Year	Title	Role	Notes	Source
1995–1997	Villa Quintana	Illuminada "Lumeng" Samonte	Episode Guest: "Abito"; Credited as "Chanda Romero"	
2000	Maalaala Mo Kaya	Charito		
2001–2002	Ikaw Lang ang Mamahalin	Amarra Luna	Supporting cast	
2002–2003	Kapalaran	Magda		
2003–2004	Narito ang Puso Ko	Clara Bautista		
2005–2006	Vietnam Rose	Vida Mojica		
2006	Now and Forever: Linlang	Gina Dimaano	Supporting cast / antagonist	
2007	Princess Charming	Doña Amparo Vda. de Saavedra	Episode Guest: "Black Jewel in the Palace" Credited as "Chanda Romero"	
2007	Magic Kamison	Maja	Supporting Cast / Protagonist	
2007	Impostora	Doña Anatella Vda. de Cayetano	Eps	
2007	Maalaala Mo Kaya	Estella		
2008	Mars Ravelo's Dyesebel	Doña Felicia Montemayor		
2008–2009	Luna Mystika	Doña Benita Sagrado		
2009	Zorro	Agida		
2009	Adik Sa'Yo	Doña Aurora Manansala		
2009	Sine Novela: Kaya Kong Abutin ang Langit	Doña Lucia Enriquez-Recto		
2010	The Last Prince	Dama Rosata		
2011	Dwarfina	Celia		
2011	Sisid	Mommy L		
2011	Sinner or Saint	Racquel	Episode Guest: "Ang Mama Kong Mamaw"; Credited as "Chanda Romero"	
2011	Spooky Nights	Mommy Glo		
2012	My Beloved	Elsa Quijano		
2012	Faithfully	Amanda Quillamor	Episode Guest: "Pulang Laso"Credited as "Chanda Romero"	
2012	Maalaala Mo Kaya	Mrs. Miranda		
2013	Kidlat	Minerva Megaton		
2013	My Husband's Lover	Soledad "Sol/Sinag" Del Mundo	Episode Guest: "Family Picture" Credited as "Chanda Romero"	
2013	Maalaala Mo Kaya	Fatima		
2014	Kambal Sirena	Doña Victorina Villanueva		
2014	Ismol Family	Mama China "Mommy C"		
2014–2015	Strawberry Lane	Ms. Digna Castro	Episode Guest: "Paano Mo Nagawa Ito?" Credited as "Chanda Romero"	
2015	Ipaglaban Mo!	Zeny		
2015	Pari 'Koy	Madam Martha Buenavista	Episode Guest: "Sa Ngalan ng Anak"; Credited as "Chanda Romero"	
2015	Magpakailanman	Mama		
2015	Princess in the Palace	Doña Pilar Buenaventura		
2015–2016	The Half Sisters	Cielo	15 episodes	
2016	Once Again	Carmen Mateo	Episode Guest: "Davao Bombing: Mga Kuwento Ng Pag-Asa" Part 1 and 2 Credited as "Chanda Romero"	
2016	Magpakailanman	Euphemia	Episode Guest: "Tungkod", credited as "Chanda Romero"	
2016	Maalaala Mo Kaya	Mrs. Pacita Piano		
2017	Legally Blind	Marissa Reyes-Evangelista	Episode Guest: "Batik: Ang Santa Claus Ng Tarlac"; Credited as "Chanda Romero"	
2017	Magpakailanman	Tess	Episode Guest: "Bagong Bahay, Bagong Away"; Credited as "Chanda Romero"	
2018	Dear Uge	Maui		
2018	Contessa	Charito Castillo vda. de Imperial / Black Scorpion	Episode Guest: "Mommy's Home"; Credited as "Chanda Romero"	
2018	Dear Uge	Remy		
2018–2019	Cain at Abel	Belenita "Belen" Castillo-Larrazabal / Fe Ledesma	Episode Guest: "Ang Halimaw na ng biyenan, at impaktong manugang" Credited as "Chanda Romero"	
2019	Dear Uge	Violy		
2019–2022	Prima Donnas	Lady Primarosa Claveria		
2023	Voltes V: Legacy	Contessa		
2023	Magandang Dilag	Sofia Veneracion vda. de Robles		
2024	Black Rider	Doña Salvacion Valerio vda. de Nadela (Romana's Mother)		
2024–2025	Forever Young	Guada		
2025–2026	FPJ's Batang Quiapo	Vice Mayor Olivia Montenegro/Guerrero-Torres†	Supporting Role / Antagonist	
2026–present	Sigabo	Deborah Zafra		

== Awards and nominations ==
Year	Film Award/Critics	Category	Work	Results
1978	Gawad Urian Awards	Best Supporting Actress (Pinakamahusay na Pangalawang Aktres)	Inay	Nominated
1979	Gawad Urian Awards	Best Supporting Actress (Pinakamahusay na Pangalawang Aktres)	Boy Pena	Won
1979	Gawad Urian Awards	Best Actress (Pinakamahusay na Pangunahing Aktres)	Mananayaw	Nominated
1982	FAMAS Awards	Best Supporting Actress	Karma	Won
1986	FAMAS Awards	Best Actress	Bakit Manipis ang Ulap?	Nominated
2014	40th Metro Manila Film Festival	Best Supporting Actress	Shake, Rattle & Roll XV	Nominated
2017	31st PMPC Star Awards for Television	Best Drama Supporting Actress	Legally Blind	Nominated
2024	50th Metro Manila Film Festival	Best Supporting Actress	Espantaho	Nominated
