= Sinner or Saint (TV series) =

2011 Philippine television drama series

- Title card
- Genre: Crime drama
- Created by: R.J. Nuevas
- Written by: R.J. Nuevas; Vienuell
- Directed by: Don Michael Perez
- Creative director: Jun Lana
- Starring: Dennis Trillo; Bianca King; Alessandra De Rossi; Polo Ravales
- Country of origin: Philippines
- Original language: Tagalog
- No. of episodes: 84

Production
- Executive producers: Mona Coles-Mayuga; Joy Lumboy-Pili
- Camera setup: Multiple-camera setup
- Running time: 30–45 minutes
- Production company: GMA Entertainment TV

Original release
- Network: GMA Network
- Release: June 13 – October 7, 2011

Sinner or Saint is a 2011 Philippine television drama crime series broadcast by GMA Network. Directed by Don Michael Perez, it stars Dennis Trillo, Bianca King, Alessandra De Rossi and Polo Ravales. It premiered on June 13, 2011 on the network's Afternoon Prime line up. The series concluded on October 7, 2011, with a total of 84 episodes.

== Cast and characters ==
Cast

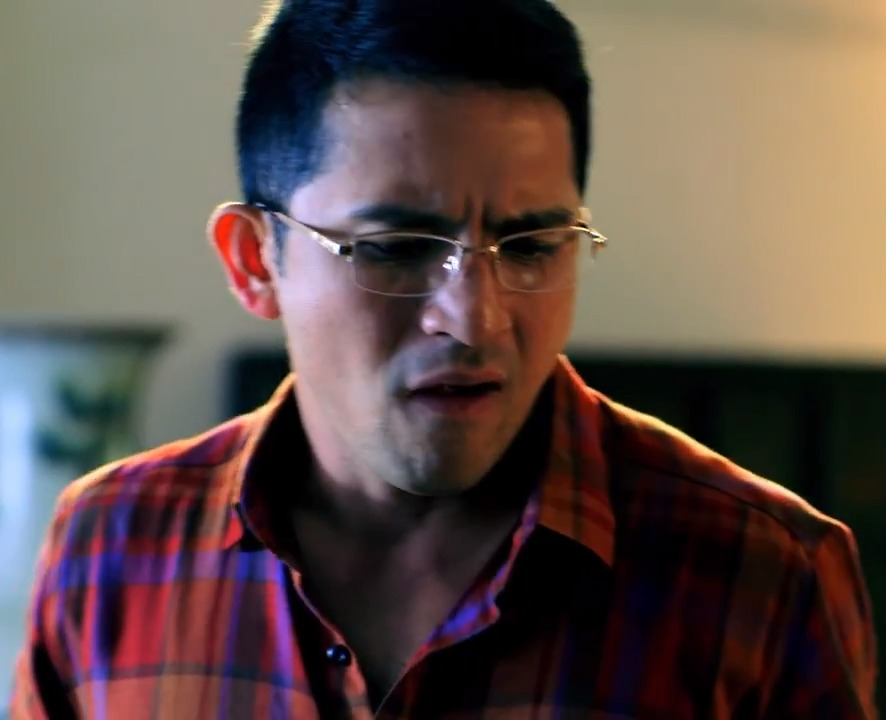
Dennis Trillo

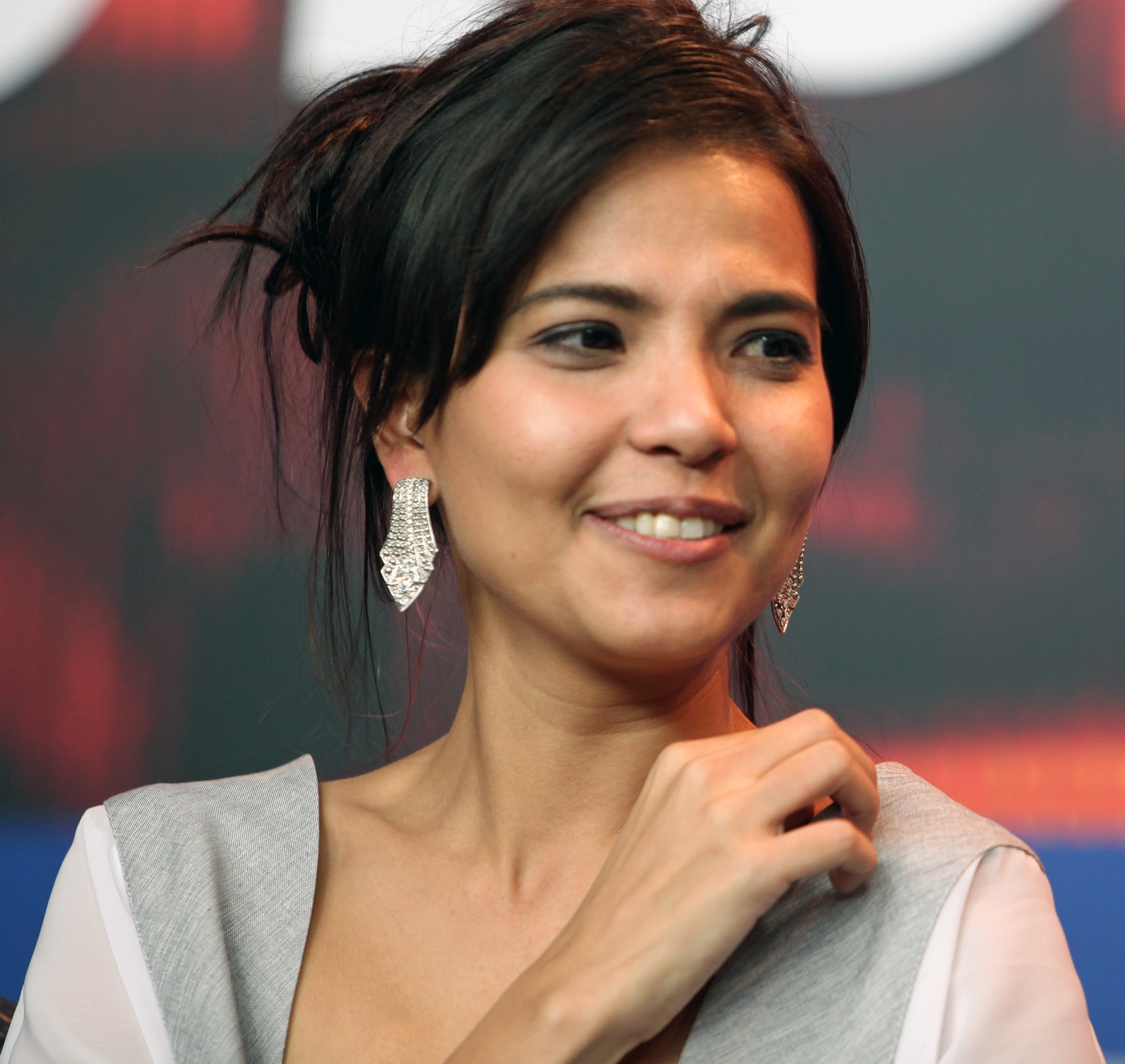
Alessandra De Rossi

Lead cast

- Dennis Trillo as Raul Marcelo
- Bianca King as Noemi Manansala
- Alessandra De Rossi as Corrine Quisumbing
- Polo Ravales as Alvin

Supporting cast

- Divina Valencia as Faustina
- Matthew Mendoza as Armand
- Timmy Cruz as Sally
- Jenine Desiderio as Celeste
- Derrick Monasterio as Santi
- Joey Paras as Gerdo "Gigi" Mana
- Kim Rodriguez as Lourdes
- Djanin Cruz as Ikang
- Glenda Garcia as Tiling
- Dexter Doria as Yvette
- Archie Adamos as Tiago
- Jay Gonzaga as Albert
- Gretchen Espina as Sarah
- Eunice Lagusad as Chona

Guest cast

- Daniella Amable as younger Noemi
- Miguel Tanfelix as younger Raul
- Chanda Romero as Racquel
- Lianne Valentin

== Casting ==
Actress Iza Calzado was initially hired for the series, for the role of Noemi Manansala. She was later replaced by Bianca King.

== Ratings ==
According to AGB Nielsen Philippines' Mega Manila household television ratings, the pilot episode of Sinner or Saint earned a 13.6% rating. The final episode scored a 21.6% rating.

== Accolades ==
Accolades received by Sinner or Saint
| Year | Award | Category | Recipient | Result | Ref. |
|---|---|---|---|---|---|
| 2011 | 8th Golden Screen TV Awards | Outstanding Performance by an Actor in a Drama Series | Dennis Trillo | Won | |
