= Showbiz Konek na Konek =

- Genre: Entertainment news, talk show
- Created by: TV5 Network, Inc.
- Presented by: IC Mendoza; MJ Marfori-Oida; Bianca King
- Country of origin: Philippines
- Original language: Filipino
- No. of seasons: 2
- No. of episodes: 130

Production
- Running time: 30 minutes

Original release
- Network: TV5
- Release: April 6 – October 2, 2015

Showbiz Konek na Konek (English: Showbiz Connect to Connect) is a Philippine television talk show broadcast by TV5. Hosted by IC Mendoza, MJ Marfori-Oida and Bianca King, it aired from April 6 to October 2, 2015. The show exempiflied unbiased showbiz reportage on artists from three big networks and giving exclusive interviews on the newsmakers in the showbiz industry.

== Hosts ==
- IC Mendoza
- MJ Marfori
- Bianca King
- Nicole Estrada (Kanto Girl)

== See also ==
- List of TV5 (Philippine TV network) original programming
