= Dyesebel (2008 TV series) =

2008 Philippine television drama series

- Title card
- Genre: Drama; Romantic fantasy
- Based on: Dyesebel by Mars Ravelo
- Developed by: Dode Cruz
- Directed by: Joyce E. Bernal; Don Michael Perez
- Starring: Marian Rivera
- Narrated by: Jean Garcia
- Theme music composer: Danny Tan
- Opening theme: "Ang Aking Mundo" by Julie Anne San Jose
- Ending theme: "Siya na Nga Kaya?" by Julie Anne San Jose
- Country of origin: Philippines
- Original language: Tagalog
- No. of episodes: 125 + 1 special

Production
- Executive producer: Helen Rose S. Sese
- Producer: Cheryl Ching-Sy
- Production locations: Coron, Palawan; Subic, Zambales; Metro Manila; Anilao, Batangas; Bolinao, Pangasinan
- Camera setup: Multiple-camera setup
- Running time: 30–45 minutes
- Production company: GMA Entertainment TV

Original release
- Network: GMA Network
- Release: April 28 – October 17, 2008

Related
- Dyesebel (2014)

Dyesebel is a 2008 Philippine television drama romance fantasy series broadcast by GMA Network. The series is based on a Philippine graphic novel of the same title by Mars Ravelo. Directed by Joyce E. Bernal and Don Michael Perez, it stars Marian Rivera in the title role. It premiered on April 28, 2008 on the network's Telebabad line up. The series concluded on October 17, 2008, with a total of 125 episodes.

== Premise ==
Dyesebel is a mermaid who will fall in love with Fredo. She must also stop the cruelties of her four adversaries: Ava, Berbola, Dyangga and Betty.

== Cast and characters ==
Cast

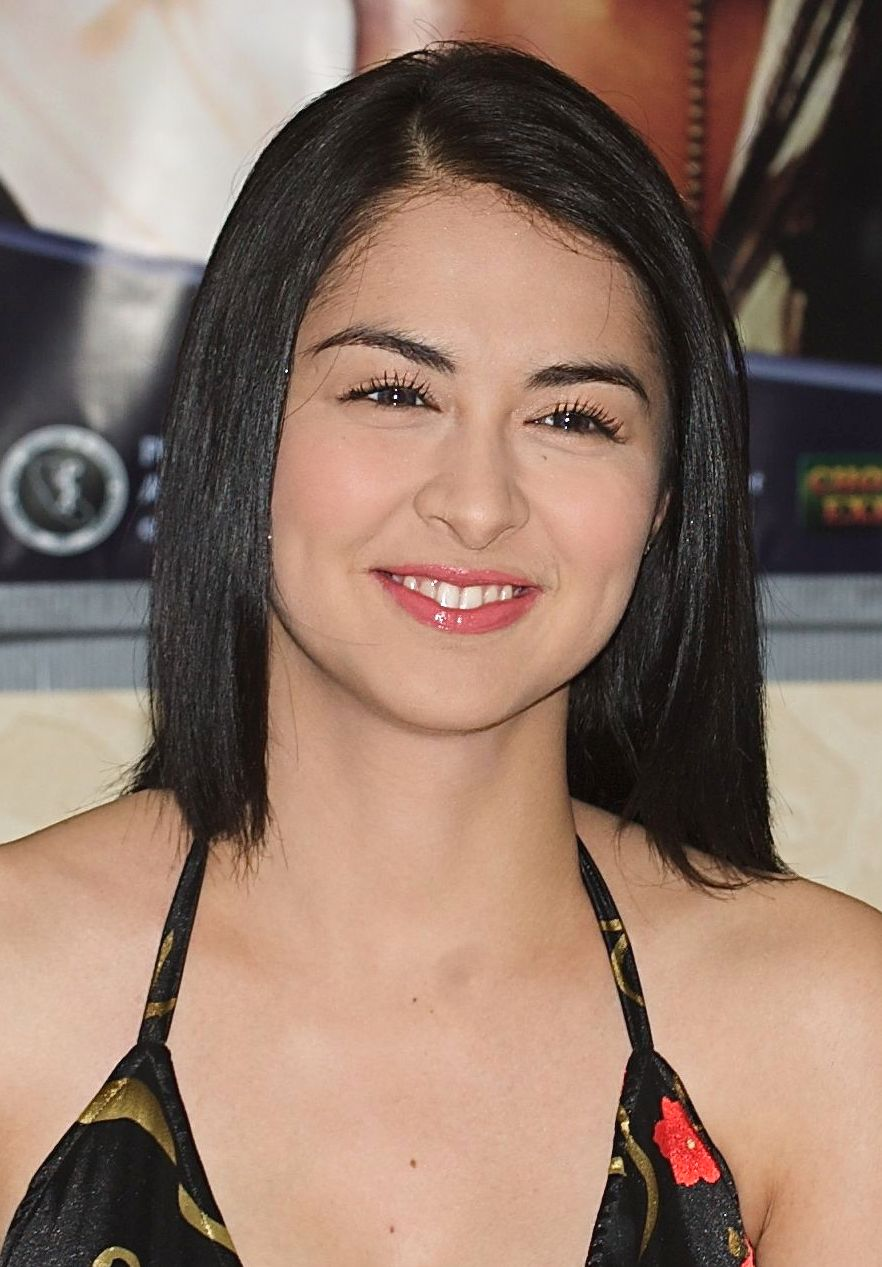
Marian Rivera

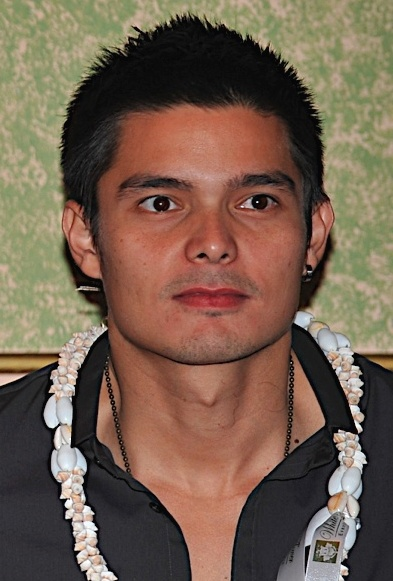
Dingdong Dantes

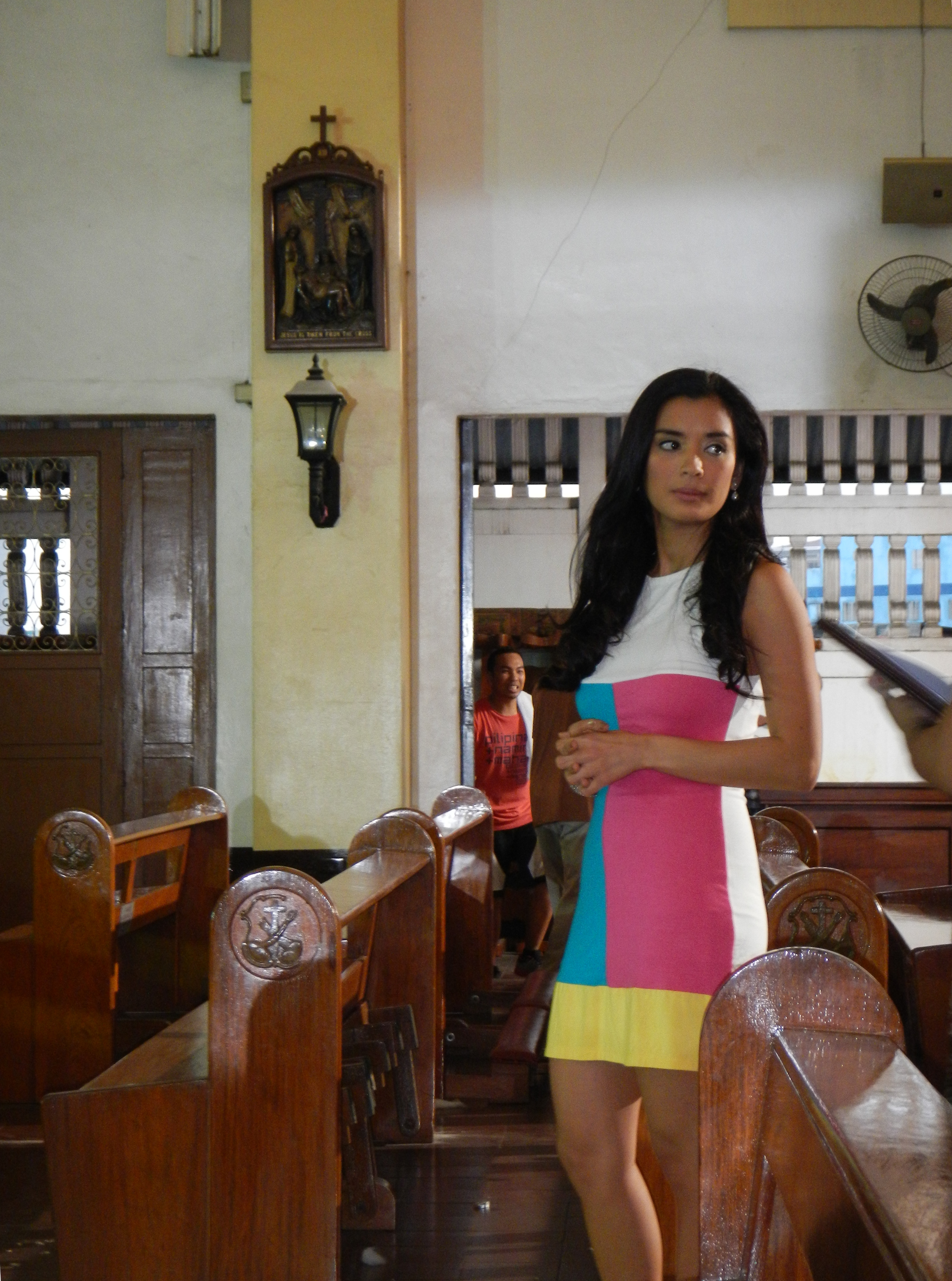
Michelle Madrigal

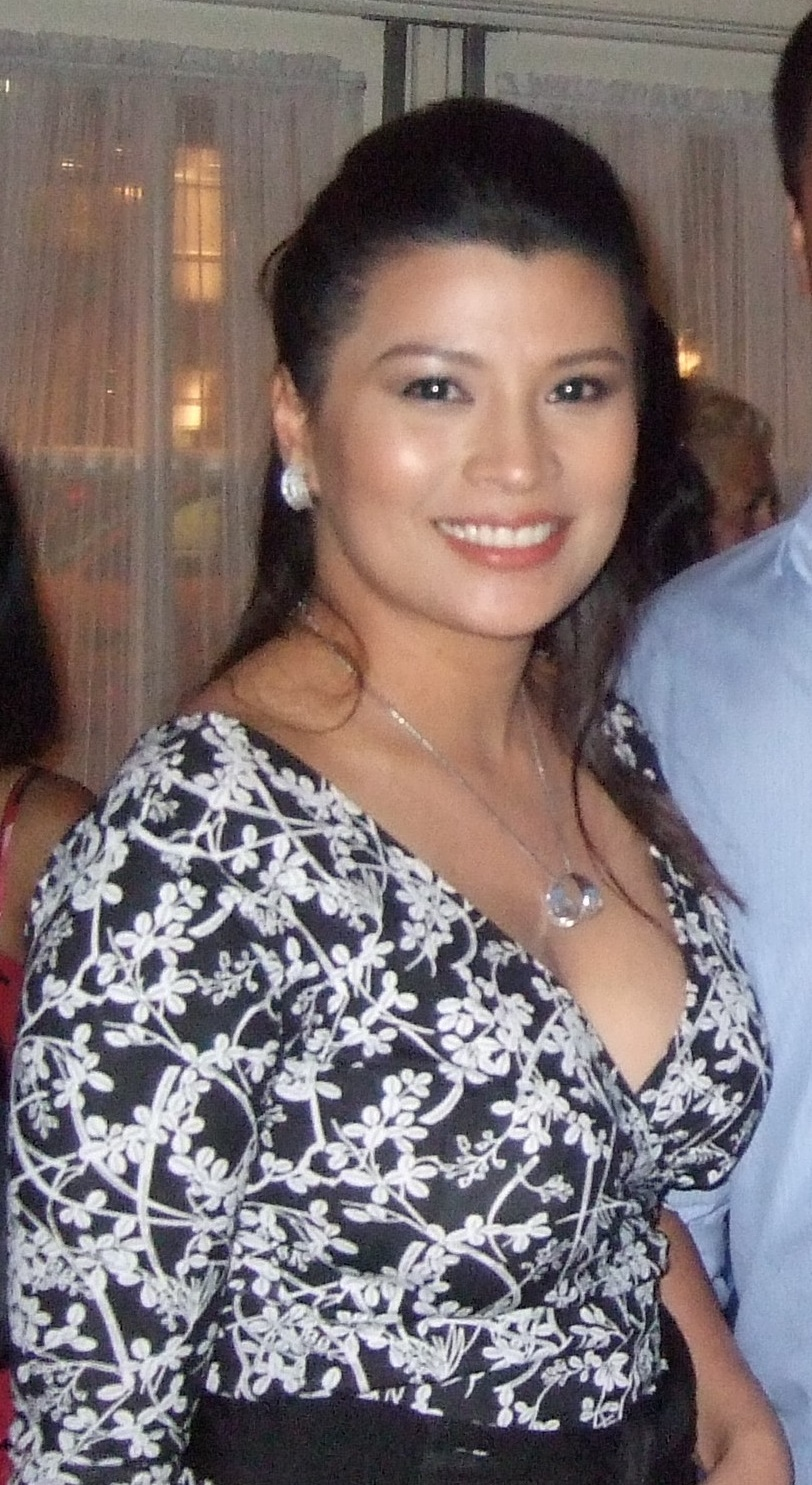
Mylene Dizon

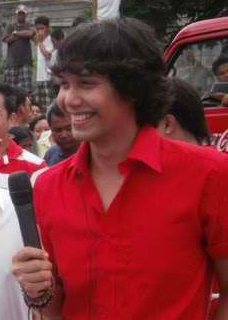
Paolo Ballesteros

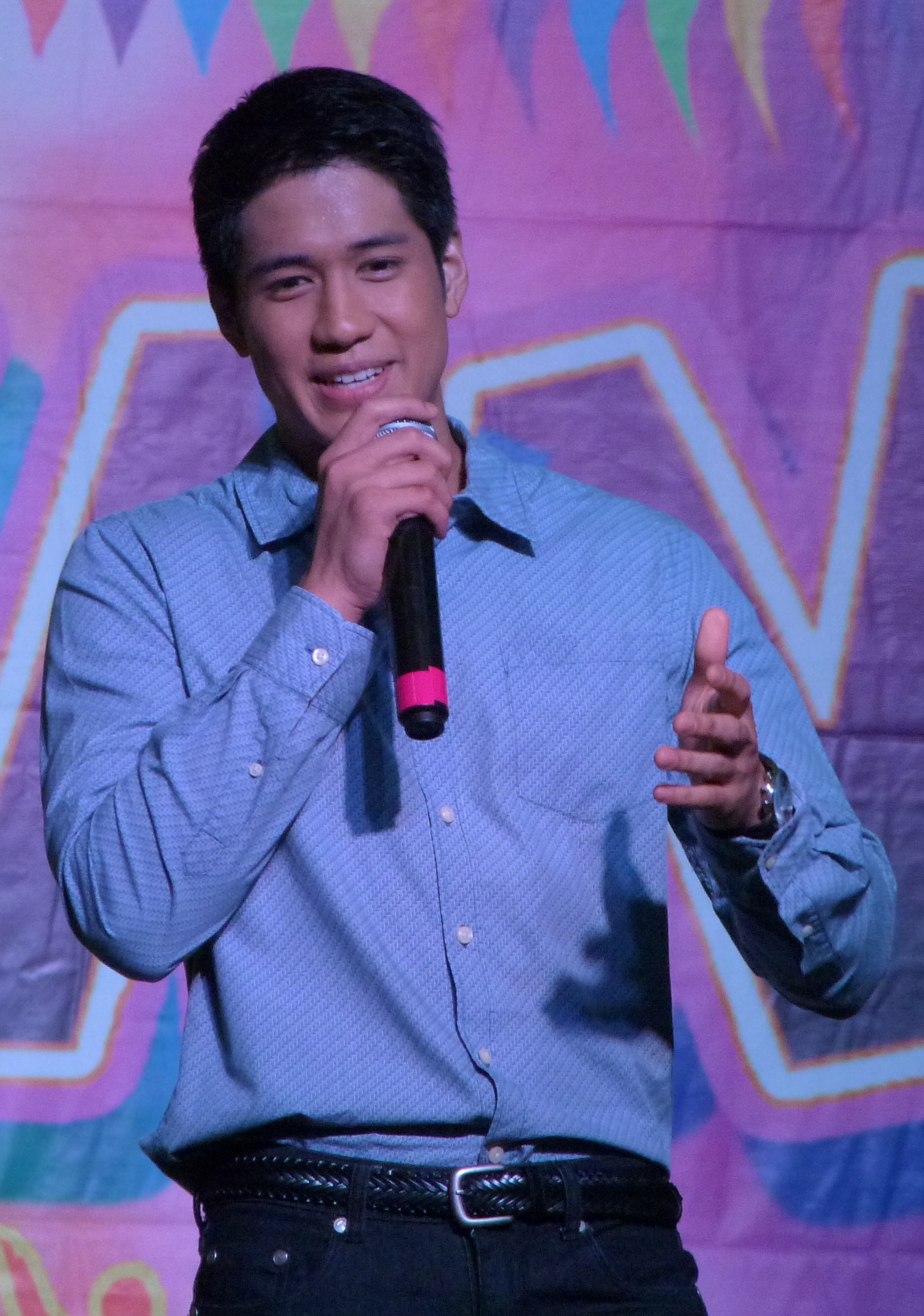
Aljur Abrenica

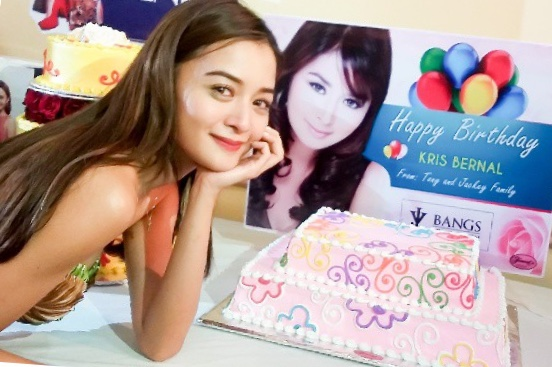
Kris Bernal

Lead cast

- Marian Rivera as Dyesebel Montemayor-Legaspi / Isabel / Cassandra

Supporting cast

- Dingdong Dantes as Fredo Legaspi
- Michelle Madrigal as Berbola / Cassandra
- Alfred Vargas as Erebus
- Rufa Mae Quinto as Amafura
- Jean Garcia as Lucia Montemayor / Ava Legaspi
- Bianca King as Betty Salcedo
- Mylene Dizon as Dyangga
- Ricky Davao as Juan Legaspi
- Lotlot de Leon as Banak
- Luis Alandy as Gildo Villarama
- Marco Alcaraz as Usaro
- Teri Onor as Akirang
- Paolo Ballesteros as Bukanding
- Aljur Abrenica as Paolo Legaspi
- Kris Bernal as Shiela Mae Legaspi / Shiela Mae Montemayor
- Hero Angeles as Mark
- Nanette Inventor as Guada
- Robert Villar as Buboy
- Chanda Romero as Felicia Montemayor

Guest cast

- Wendell Ramos as Florentino "Tino" Montemayor
- Vaness del Moral as Sosira
- Filiberto Nepomuceno as Butete
- Charlotte Hermoso as Jelay
- Ryan Yllana as Leo
- Philip Lazaro as Charity
- Mariz Ricketts as Melba
- Jackie Rice as Arana
- Fayatollah as Lady Dee
- KC Hollmann as Gildo's secretary
- Mang Enriquez as Mike
- Chinggoy Alonzo as Ernesto Montemayor
- Andrea del Rosario as Vivian Montemayor
- Kevin Santos as Fonsy
- Angel Estrada as Vicky
- Matt Ranillo III as Enrico Salcedo
- Jen Rosendahl as Vivian's friend
- Elizabeth Ramsey as Pearls' mother
- Joseph Marco as Joseph

== Production ==
Principal photography commenced on April 6, 2008 at Coron, Palawan. Filming concluded in October 2008. Filming also took place in Batanes.

== Ratings ==
According to AGB Nielsen Philippines' Mega Manila household television ratings, the pilot episode of Dyesebel earned a 44.9% rating. The final episode scored a 41.1% rating.

== Accolades ==
Year	Award	Category	Recipient	Result	Ref.
2009	GMMSF Box-Office Entertainment Awards	Most Popular Television Program	Dyesebel	Won	
2009	GMMSF Box-Office Entertainment Awards	Most Popular TV Director	Joyce Bernal	Won	
