= Once Again (Philippine TV series) =

2016 Philippine television drama series

- Title card
- Genre: Drama; Romantic fantasy
- Created by: Jonathan Cruz
- Written by: R.J. Nuevas; Des Garbes-Severino; Kit Villanueva-Langit; Suzette Doctolero
- Directed by: Don Michael Perez
- Creative director: Roy Iglesias
- Starring: Janine Gutierrez; Aljur Abrenica
- Theme music composer: Jon Vera-Perez
- Opening theme: "Iibigin Kang Muli" by Derrick Monasterio and Hannah Precillas
- Country of origin: Philippines
- Original language: Tagalog
- No. of episodes: 59

Production
- Executive producer: Joy Lumboy-Pili
- Production locations: Quezon City, Philippines; Batangas, Philippines
- Cinematography: Rhino Vidanes
- Editors: Benedict Lavastida; Noel Mauricio
- Camera setup: Multiple-camera setup
- Running time: 24–35 minutes
- Production company: GMA Entertainment TV

Original release
- Network: GMA Network
- Release: May 2 – July 22, 2016

Once Again is a 2016 Philippine television drama romantic fantasy series broadcast by GMA Network. Directed by Don Michael Perez, it stars Janine Gutierrez and Aljur Abrenica. It premiered on May 2, 2016 on the network's Telebabad line up. The series concluded on July 22, 2016, with a total of 59 episodes.

The series is streaming online on YouTube.

== Premise ==
Reign and Edgar loves each other. However, Reign's family will arrange her marriage to Lukas. As Edgar and Reign fight their way through the tussle, the two lovers lose their lives because of Lukas. They will meet each other again after twenty years in a different time and place as two different people as Des and Aldrin with the same love for each other.

== Cast and characters ==
Cast

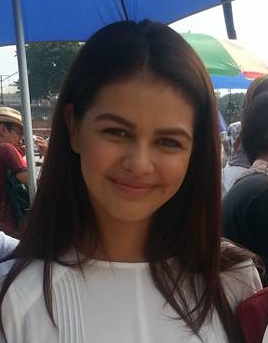
Janine Gutierrez

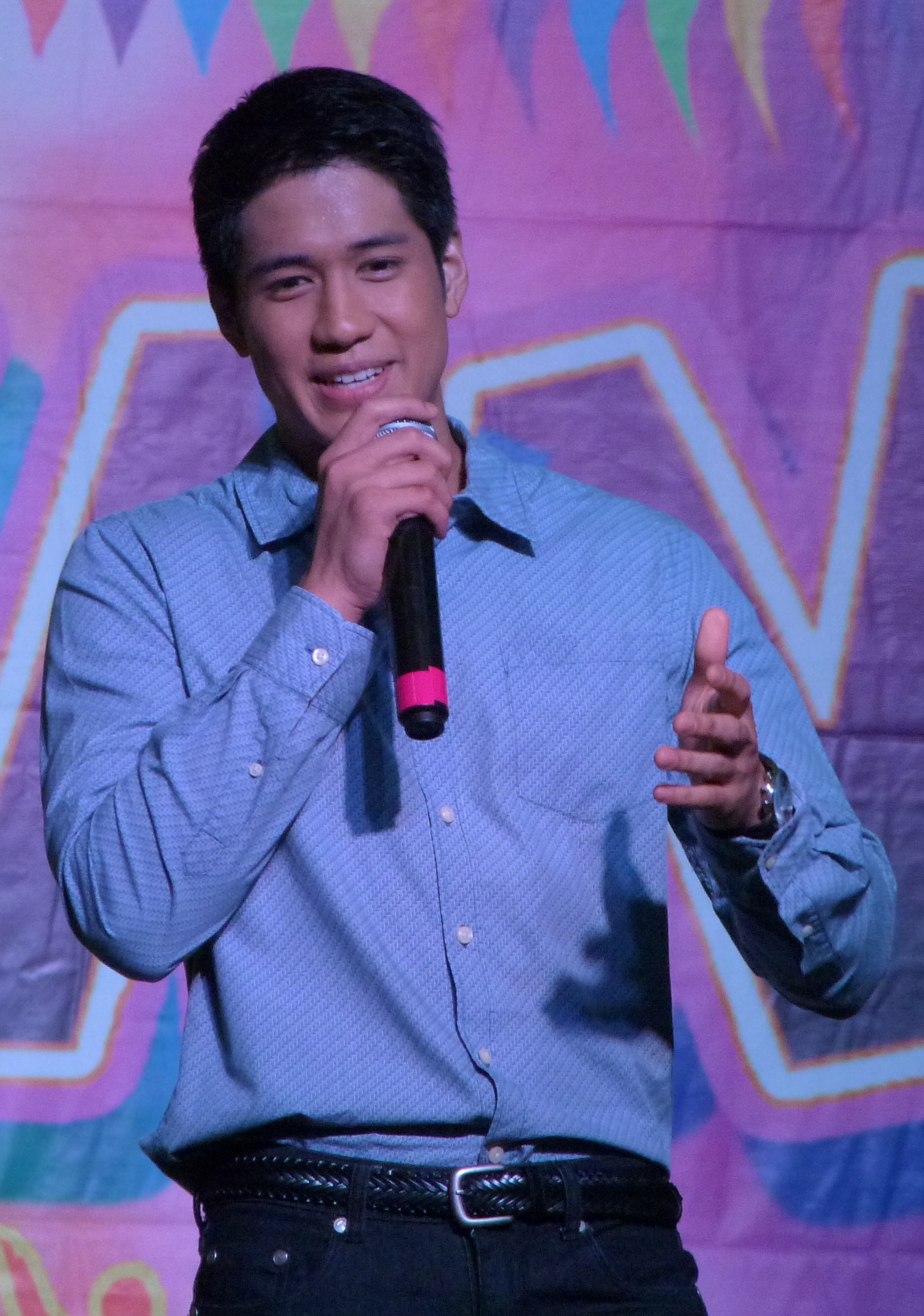
Aljur Abrenica

Lead cast

- Janine Gutierrez as Regina "Reign" Soriano / Desiree "Des" Mateo / Paula Carbonnel
- Aljur Abrenica as Edgardo "Edgar" del Mundo / Aldrin Sanchez

Supporting cast

- Jean Garcia as Madel Mateo
- Sheryl Cruz as Agnes Lacson-Carbonnel
- Chanda Romero as Carmen Mateo
- Joko Diaz as Lucas Carbonnel
- Emilio Garcia as Tony Sanchez
- Timmy Cruz as Nancy Sanchez
- Thea Tolentino as Celeste Lacson Carbonnel-Sanchez
- Jeric Gonzales as JV Sanchez

Recurring cast

- Lovely Rivero as Vicky Pineda
- Analyn Barro as Diana "Daday" Gonzalvo
- Yasser Marta as Eric Alfonso
- Mariam Al-Alawi as Joan Torres
- Shelly Hipolito as Phoebe Sanchez
- Gerald Madrid as Jason Gutierrez

Guest cast

- Christopher de Leon as Ricardo Soriano
- Sharmaine Arnaiz as Violeta Soriano
- Therese Malvar as Lynnel Soriano
- Bembol Roco as Romulo del Mundo
- Irma Adlawan as Cecilia del Mundo
- Faith da Silva as Carol del Mundo
- Ar Angel Aviles as Liza del Mundo
- Dayara Shane as younger Paula / Des
- Zarah Mae Deligero as younger Daday
- Will Ashley de Leon as younger Aldrin
- Phytos Ramirez as younger Lucas
- Lharby Policarpio as younger Jason
- Archie Adamos as Lando
- Prince Clemente as Gilbert
- Lilia Cuntapay as Impong Sula
- Sheila Marie Rodriguez as Patricia

== Ratings ==
Once Again ratings
No.	Original air date	AGB Nielsen Mega Manila Households Television Homes
1	May 2, 2016	17.3%
2	May 3, 2016	17.9%
3	May 4, 2016	16.6%
4	May 5, 2016	18.2%
5	May 6, 2016	16.8%
6	May 10, 2016	18.9%
7	May 11, 2016	17.6%
8	May 12, 2016	19.5%
9	May 13, 2016	17.2%
10	May 16, 2016	17.2%
11	May 17, 2016	18.3%
12	May 18, 2016	15.8%
13	May 19, 2016	17.5%
14	May 20, 2016	16.2%
15	May 23, 2016	18.6%
16	May 24, 2016	18.8%
17	May 25, 2016	18.8%
18	May 26, 2016	20.3%
19	May 27, 2016	19.2%
20	May 30, 2016	15.7%
21	May 31, 2016	17.8%
22	June 1, 2016	17.4%
23	June 2, 2016	18.9%
24	June 3, 2016	19.6%
25	June 6, 2016	17.9%
26	June 7, 2016	19.5%
27	June 8, 2016	18.4%
28	June 9, 2016	20.1%
29	June 10, 2016	19.1%
30	June 13, 2016	20.5%
31	June 14, 2016	21.1%
32	June 15, 2016	21.2%
33	June 16, 2016	20.4%
34	June 17, 2016	19.1%
35	June 20, 2016	18.9%
36	June 21, 2016	19.3%
37	June 22, 2016	19.9%
38	June 23, 2016	19.6%
39	June 24, 2016	19.2%
40	June 27, 2016	19.8%
41	June 28, 2016	19.6%
42	June 29, 2016	18.6%
43	June 30, 2016	19.4%
44	July 1, 2016	16.6%
45	July 4, 2016	17.2%
46	July 5, 2016	15.9%
47	July 6, 2016	15.9%
48	July 7, 2016	18.8%
49	July 8, 2016	19.0%
50	July 11, 2016	17.2%
51	July 12, 2016	17.4%
52	July 13, 2016	17.9%
53	July 14, 2016	18.4%
54	July 15, 2016	19.9%
55	July 18, 2016	21.7%
56	July 19, 2016	20.8%
57	July 20, 2016	19.6%
58	July 21, 2016	18.7%
59	July 22, 2016	19.8%

== Production ==
Principal photography commenced in April 2016.
