= Obsession (2014 TV series) =

- Title card
- Genre: Medical drama Melodrama; Psychological thriller Romance
- Developed by: Elmer L. Gatchalian
- Directed by: Jay Altarejos
- Starring: Bianca King; Neri Naig; Martin Escudero; Marvin Agustin
- Country of origin: Philippines
- Original language: Tagalog
- No. of episodes: 12

Production
- Production locations: Metro Manila, Philippines
- Running time: 60 minutes

Original release
- Network: TV5
- Release: January 23 – April 10, 2014

Obsession is a 2014 Philippine television medical drama series broadcast by TV5. Directed by Jay Altarejos, it stars Bianca King, Neri Naig, Martin Escudero and Marvin Agustin. It aired on the network's evening line up from January 23 to April 10, 2014, replacing For Love or Money and was replaced by Movie Max 5.

== Synopsis ==
Bernadette (Neri Naig) falls in love with James (Martin Escudero), but he never loved her. Her obsession to James turned her to Ramon (Marvin Agustin), a doctor similarly obsessed to a woman named Vanessa (Bianca King). He agreed to change her face according to her desire; unknown to her, the doctor fell madly in love with her that indulged them in dark tendencies.

== Cast ==
- Bianca King as Vanessa Villareal / Bernadette Cabrera
- Neri Naig as Bernadette Cabrera
- Martin Escudero as James Calderon
- Marvin Agustin as Ramon Mendoza
- Elizabeth Oropesa as Regina Mendoza
- Maureen Mauricio as Eliza Villareal
- Richard Quan as Jaime Calderon
- Shiela Marie Rodriguez as Irene Calderon
- Kerbie Zamora as Timothy Cabrera
- Franchesca Salcedo as Lucy Calderon
