= Zorro (Philippine TV series) =

2009 Philippine television drama series

- Title card
- Genre: Action drama
- Based on: Zorro by Johnston McCulley
- Developed by: Don Michael Perez
- Directed by: Mark A. Reyes V; Dominic Zapata
- Starring: Richard Gutierrez
- Theme music composer: Tats Faustino
- Ending theme: "Zorro" by Janno Gibbs
- Country of origin: Philippines
- Original languages: Tagalog; Spanish
- No. of episodes: 98

Production
- Executive producer: Angie C. Castrence
- Production locations: Las Casas Filipinas de Acuzar Heritage Village, Bagac, Bataan, Philippines
- Camera setup: Multiple-camera setup
- Running time: 18–41 minutes
- Production company: GMA Entertainment TV

Original release
- Network: GMA Network
- Release: March 23 – August 7, 2009

Zorro is a 2009 Philippine television drama action series broadcast by GMA Network. The series is based on the Zorro character created by Johnston McCulley. Directed by Mark A. Reyes V and Dominic Zapata, it stars Richard Gutierrez in the title role. It premiered on March 23, 2009, on the network's Telebabad line up. The series concluded on August 7, 2009, with a total of 98 episodes.

The series is streaming online on YouTube.

== Cast and characters ==
Cast

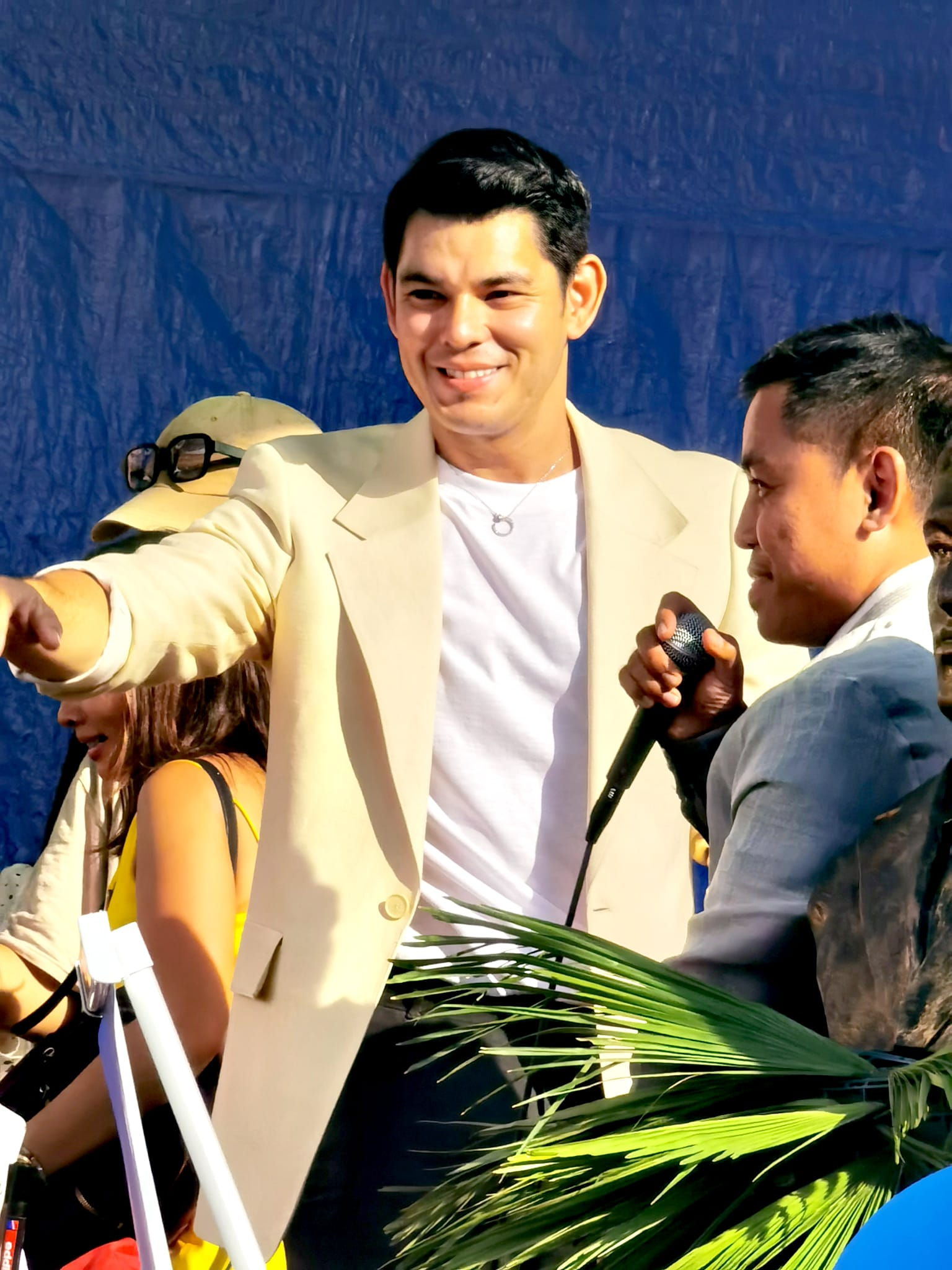
Richard Gutierrez

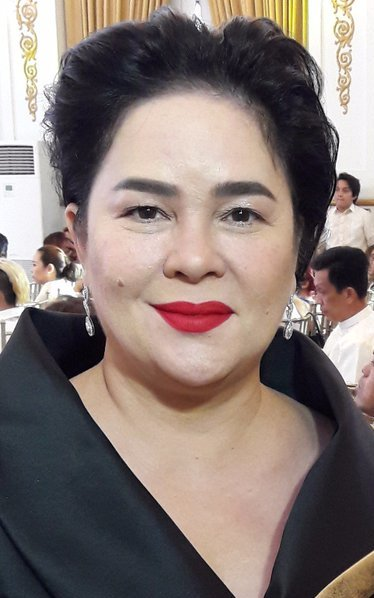
Jaclyn Jose

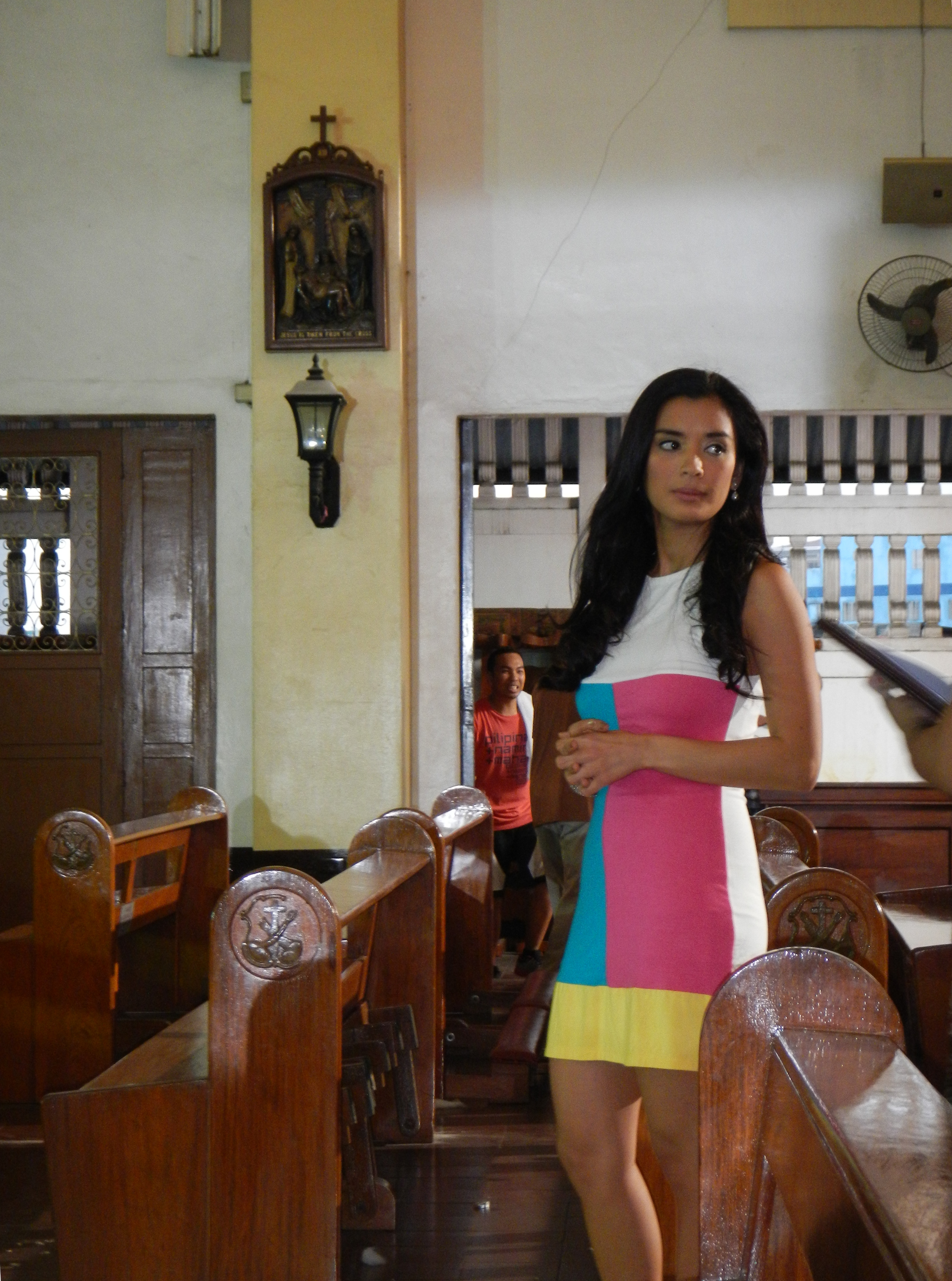
Michelle Madrigal

Lead cast

- Richard Gutierrez as Antonio de la Cruz Pelaez / Zorro

Supporting cast

- Rhian Ramos as Lolita Pulido
- Eddie Gutierrez as Luis Aragon
- Jaclyn Jose as Chiquita Pelaez
- Joel Torre as Roberto Pelaez / Rosso
- Sandy Andolong as Maria Manalo
- Ricky Davao as Felipe Gomez
- Gloria Sevilla as Zita
- TJ Trinidad as Ramon Pelaez
- Maureen Larrazabal as Bella de la Cruz
- Epy Quizon as Shihong / Tahong
- Leo Martinez as Carlos Pulido
- Pinky Marquez as Catalina Pulido
- Bianca King as Cara
- Michelle Madrigal as Juana Manalo / Caballera
- Bobby Andrews as Pedro Gonzales
- Antonio Aquitania as Bernardo
- Sheena Halili as Lena
- Bubbles Paraiso as Magda
- Buboy Villar
- Elvis Gutierrez as Silverio
- Bodie Cruz as Agustin Manalo
- Robert Villar as Pepe Alugbati
- Shiela Marie Rodriguez as Lisa
- Sugar Mercado as Anna

Guest cast

- Lani Mercado as Marcela de la Cruz
- Mark Gil as Horacio Pelaez
- Jomari Yllana as Diego de la Vega
- Jacob Rica as younger Antonio
- Gail Lardizabal as younger Lolita
- Dante Rivero as magistrate of Angeles
- Chanda Romero as Aguida
- Dick Israel as Jumal
- Jen Rosendahl as Jumal's assistant
- Isabel Granada as Minerva
- Edwin Reyes as Tomas
- Daria Ramirez as Aswang
- Yul Servo as Samurai
- Suzette Ranillo as Chiquita's assistant
- Nonie Buencamino as De los Reyes
- Richie Paul Gutierrez as Sebastian
- Rocky Gutierrez as Baltazar
- Alfred Vargas as Lima Wong
- Felix Roco as Diego
- Dominic Roco as Daniel
- Bearwin Meily as a pirate
- LJ Reyes as Sandy
- Paloma Esmeria as Paquita Pakwan

== Production ==
Principal photography commenced in February 2009. Filming concluded in July 2009.

== Ratings ==
According to AGB Nielsen Philippines' Mega Manila household television ratings, the pilot episode of Zorro earned a 35.8% rating. The final episode scored a 32% rating.
