= Tumbok =

- Theatrical Release Poster
- Directed by: Topel Lee
- Written by: Aloy Adlawan
- Starring: Cristine Reyes; Carlo Aquino; Ryan Eigenmann
- Distributed by: Viva Films
- Release date: May 4, 2011
- Country: Philippines
- Languages: Tagalog; English

Tumbok is a 2011 Filipino horror film starring Cristine Reyes and Carlo Aquino produced by Viva Films. Pre-release hype focused on the love scenes performed by the leads.

== Plot ==
A married couple inherits a condo unit, unknown to them the area resides in a negative energy convergence area, which made the inhabitants unlucky.

== Cast ==
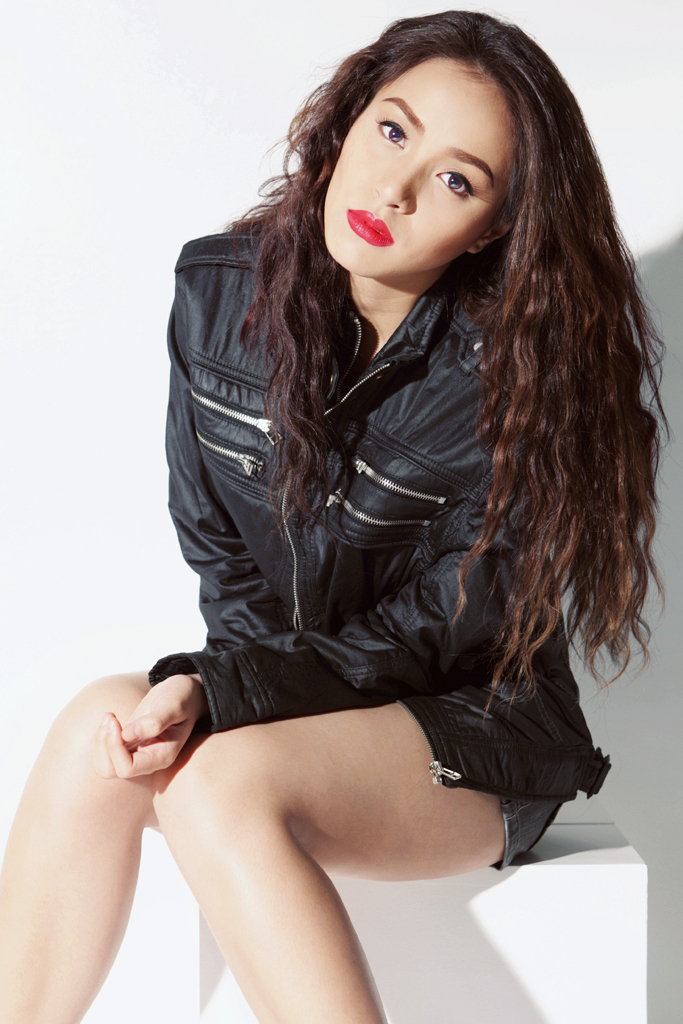
Cristine Reyes portrays Grace.

- Cristine Reyes as Grace
- Carlo Aquino as Ronnie
- Ryan Eigenmann as Mark
- Ara Mina as Rita
- Jao Mapa as Benjie
- DJ Durano as Ward
- LJ Moreno as Lumen
- Wendy Valdez as Lizet
- Malou de Guzman as Elsie
- Ana Capri as Idang
- Abby Bautista as Isay
- Dino Imperial as Gio
- Francheska Salcedo as Yumi

== Reception ==
Box Office: 10.53 million

== See also ==
- List of ghost films
