= Franchesca Salcedo =

Filipino actress

Chesca Salcedo
- Born: Franchesca Abanador Salcedo; March 16, 2002 (age 23); San Pablo, Laguna, Philippines
- Other names: Chesca; Fran
- Occupation: Actress
- Years active: 2007–present

Franchesca Abanador "Chesca" Salcedo (born March 16, 2002) is a Filipino actress. She plays the role of Cruzita Aldama Santibañez in MariMar, the legitimate daughter of Marimar Aldama and Sergio Santibañez. Although her nickname in real life is Cruzita, her acting roles in both MariMar and Claudine had her playing a character named Cruzita, which she was given after her stint on the former.

== Early life and career ==
Prior to acting in MariMar, Franchesca auditioned for the main role in Maria Flordeluna and was accepted. However, during the pre-photoshoot for Maria Flordeluna she was told on the spot that she was replaced by Eliza Pineda, her current co-star in Kambal, Karibal. Franchesca is currently attending home study program as a student in Angelicum College.

Franchesca portrayed the role of Cruzita Aldama Santibañez in MariMar that make her debut in big screen and made her first TV appearances. She then went back to big screen after a years in 2010 to portray the role of Marva in Panday Kids. Francheska mailed to Wish Ko Lang for his brother who has mental illness she only wants treatment for his brothers illness. In 2010, Francheska Salcedo played the role of Sugar Ferrer in the new installment of Sine Novela: Trudis Liit as a young villain of Trudis. She also take part of the movie titled "Dota o ako the movie".

In 2017, Franchesca Salcedo joins the cast of GMA Network hit primetime drama series Kambal, Karibal where she portrayed the role of Nori, a goth, good best friend of Crisan (played by Bianca Umali).

== Filmography ==
=== Television ===
Year	Title	Role
2021	The Lost Recipe	Liz
2018	Ika-5 Utos	Lara
2018	Inday Will Always Love You	Jing
2018	Tadhana: Hinog sa Pilit	Sarah
2017–2018	Kambal, Karibal	Norilyn "Nori" Salcedo / Frenny
2017	Maynila: The Wrong Mr. Right	Lelet's friend
2015	Baker King	Young Celine
2014	Obsession	Lucy Calderon
2013	Magpakailanman: The Alden Richards Story	Riza
2013	Istorifik: Bantay Ni Betchay	Perfidia
2013	Kakambal ni Eliana	Young Marga
2012	Enchanted Garden	Young Guia
2012	Pidol's Wonderland: Moomoo Mia	Serena
2012	Tween Hearts	Young Heidi
2011	Pidol's Wonderland: Kelly Kalat	Kelly
2011	Pidol's Wonderland: Ella Brathinella	Ella
2011	5 Girls and a Dad	Valerie
2011	Amaya	Young Binayaan
2011	Magic Palayok	Suyen
2010	Trudis Liit	Sugar Ferrer
2010	Panday Kids	Marva
2010	Claudine: Stage Mother	Cruzita
2009	Rosalinda	Young Fedra
2007	MariMar	Cruzita Aldama Santibañez

=== Film ===
Year	Title	Role
2011	Tumbok	Yumi
2019	Black Lipstick	
