= Bianca King =

Filipino actress

- Born: Bianca Charlotte King; 18 March 1986 (age 40); Germany
- Education: De La Salle–College of Saint Benilde
- Occupation: Actress
- Years active: 2004–present
- Agents: Sparkle GMA Artist Center (2004–2014; 2025–present) Talent5 (2014–2016) Star Magic (2017–2019); Cornerstone Entertainment (2024–present)
- Spouse: Ralph Wintle (m. 2021)
- Children: 1
- Relatives: Iza Calzado (sister-in-law)
- Website: biancaking.com

Bianca Charlotte King-Wintle (born 18 March 1986) is a German-born Filipino-Canadian comeback actress best known for playing the role as Betty in fantasy-drama series Dyesebel (2008), Noemi Manansala in the thriller drama series Sinner or Saint (2011), as Aviona in the hit fantaserye Mulawin (2004), as well as her first lead prime time soap, Luna Blanca (2012), where in she played the title role of black-skinned Luna.

King starred in the afternoon drama Maghihintay Pa Rin of GMA Network with Rafael Rosell and Dion Ignacio.

She went to San Beda College Alabang during her grade school and high school years. She then proceeded to take up AB Digital Filmmaking in De La Salle–College of Saint Benilde and is a music video director.

King's biggest breaks where Sinner or Saint in 2011 and Broken Vow in 2012. In 2014, she transferred to TV5 where she started in the Tuesday primetime drama Obsession with Marvin Agustin and Neri Naig and Elizabeth Oropesa and got another main role in comedy show Mac and Chiz and hosted TV5’s Showbiz Konek na Konek. In 2017, she came back to television on ABS-CBN's Pusong Ligaw as her first soap with the network since her transfer. According to King, she did not tell anyone about her transfer, but only to former co-star Iza Calzado, a former GMA Television artist and her now sister-in-law.

== Biography ==
=== Early life and career beginnings ===
Bianca Charlotte King was born on March 18, 1986, in Germany to a Filipino mother and Canadian father. Her career started at the age of 13, when she began modeling for print ads and TV commercials. She did ads for a deodorant, beverage and hotdogs brands, to name a few.

== Career ==
=== 2004–2014: Mulawin and supporting roles ===
In 2004, King was first cast as part of the last batch of Click, where she played the role of a golden-hearted balikbayan, Marnie. Her on-screen partner was Warren Austria, whose claim to fame is his shampoo commercial. Bianca was joined by then the winners of first season of StarStruck who were Mark Herras, Jennylyn Mercado, Yasmien Kurdi and Rainier Castillo. After her role on Click, King was cast in the telefantasya entitled Mulawin led by Richard Gutierrez as Aguiluz and Angel Locsin as Alwina. King played the role of Aviona, a female warrior who was secretly in love with Aguiluz. Before landing a lead role in 2011, Mulawin was considered to be her biggest break as she was one of the lead casts together with Gutierrez, Locsin and Dennis Trillo. According to her, she consider that moment the "turning point" of her career because she was "able to show off her talent purely in acting".

In 2005, King also tried her hosting skills via the gender-sensitive magazine show 3R together with Iza Calzado, Bettina Carlos and Chynna Ortaleza. King was also part of the sixth season of the youth-oriented romance-based show, Love to Love, entitled Wish Upon a Jar starring Yasmien Kurdi and Rainier Castillo. She also got her break in the silver screen via the independent film, Birhen ng Manaoag led by Jodi Sta. Maria. She played the role of Marie, the daughter of the character of Cherrie Pie Picache. She also got a role in the movie Hari ng Sablay led by Bearwin Meily as Monica. In December 2005, King was part of 2 of the 8 film entries in the 2005 Metro Manila Film Festival. She reprise her role of Aviona in the movie version of Mulawin wherein the film stood as the television series' sequel. Aside from her role as Aviona, King was also part in the fourth installment of one of Regal Films' most successful movie franchises, Mano Po 4: Ako Legal Wife. Aside from her Mano Po appearance, Regal Films also made King to be part of I Will Always Love You starred by Richard Gutierrez and Angel Locsin. She was also hand picked by Mark Meily to star in the short film, The Sugar Affair.

In 2006, King was signed up by Herbench to endorse their summer line. One of the leading men's magazine in the Philippines featured Bianca twice on their cover, the first through their September 2005 and again on the June 2006 issue. Bianca was voted as one of FHM's 100 sexiest women several times.

King was also chosen by Bench to be one of the main endorsers of the Bench Fever: Underwear Fashion Show 2006. Her billboards were scattered all over the metropolis and she wowed the crowd onstage that day at the Big Dome. She had a cameo role in Rufa Mae Quinto's Oh My Ghost! under OctoArts Films and was part of GMA Network's multi-million underwater fantasy series, Atlantika.

King was once again became a part of Love 2 Love opposite StarStruck winner, Mark Herras, in the series entitled My Darling Mermaid as Patty and in the last installment entitled Jass Got Lucky led by Lovi Poe and Cogie Domingo.

In 2007, she was part of the success of the phenomenal television hit, Marimar, where she played Natalia Montenegro. After her Marimar role, she landed a role in one of the casts of Sine Novela: My Only Love. The said remake was led by Rhian Ramos and Mark Herras. Bianca King also starred in GMA Network's telefantasya, Dyesebel, which she worked with Marian Rivera for the third time since Marimar and Super Twins.

=== 2009–2014: Breakthrough shows, directorial debut and further projects ===
In early 2009, King was cast as one of the leading ladies of Richard Gutierrez's character in the Philippine adaptation of Zorro together with Rhian Ramos and Michelle Madrigal. She was also part in the first story under SRO Cinemaserye series, Ganti. She co-starred with Marvin Agustin, Sheryl Cruz and Geoff Eigenmann. For the 2009 Metro Manila Film Festival, King was part of the film entry Wapakman led by the boxing champ, Manny Pacquiao.

The year 2009 marked Bianca King's directorial debut through Hale's first single in their fourth album, "Bahay Kubo". GMA Network also gave Bianca the director's job for Frencheska Farr's debut single, "Today I'll See The Sun". Both songs directed by King were able to be in the hit charts in the local music scenes.

During the first quarter of 2010, King was cast in The Last Prince. She portrayed the role of Bawana, the one who loved Prinsipe Almiro/Haring Almiro (Abrenica) but the latter chose to love Lara Fernandez (Bernal).

In 2013, she starred in her last project with the network, Maghihintay Pa Rin.

=== Move to TV5 (2014–2016): Failed projects, unrated shows ===
She signed an exclusive contract with TV5 after thirteen years being a Kapuso. She started getting main roles in Obsession and Mac and Chiz and started her hosting career in Showbiz Konek na Konek. She stayed with the Kapatid Network until 2016.

=== Transferring to ABS-CBN: Pusong Ligaw as an extra role and other supporting roles (2016–2019) ===
She left TV5 after two years and moved to ABS-CBN, she was cast in Pusong Ligaw as her first major project in the network and became a performer on ASAP. In 2018–2019, she starred as Aliyah Torres in an extended stint on Halik.

== Filmography ==
=== Film ===
Year	Title	Role
2005	Birhen ng Manaoag	Marie
2005	Mano Po 4: Ako Legal Wife	Trixia Sy
2005	Mulawin the Movie	Aviona
2005	Hari ng Sablay	Monica
2006	Oh My Ghost!	Jolina
2006	I Will Always Love You	Donna
2006	Gigil	Kit
2008	One True Love	Ara Mejares
2008	Iskul Bukol: 20 Years After	Girlie
2009	Wapakman	Mystika
2010	Working Girls	Dara Dela Vega
2011	San Lazaro	Cheska
2012	Sosy Problems	Danielle Alvarez

=== Television ===
Year	Title	Role
2004	Click	Marnie
2004–2005	Mulawin	Aviona
2005	Love to Love: Wish Upon a Jar	Miel
2006	Love to Love: My Darling Mermaid	Patty
2006	Love to Love: Jass Got Lucky	Paris
2006–2007	Atlantika	Xera
2007	Super Twins	Katrina Roces
2007–2008	Marimar	Natalia Montenegro
2007–2008	Sine Novela: My Only Love	Trixie
2008	Mars Ravelo's Dyesebel	Betty Salcedo
2009	SRO Cinemaserye: Ganti Ng Puso	Janelle Alcantara
2009	Zorro	Cara
2010	The Last Prince	Diwani Bawana
2011	Mars Ravelo's Captain Barbell	Lary Gempez
2011	Sinner or Saint	Noemi Manansala
2011	Spooky Nights: Parol	Carol
2012	Legacy	Young Isabel
2012	Broken Vow	Melissa Santiago
2012	Spooky Valentine: Maestra	Elena
2012	Spooky Nights: Kasambahay	Laura
2012	Luna Blanca	Adult Luna
2013	Maghihintay Pa Rin	Geneva "Gen" De Villa
2014	Obsession	Vanessa Villareal / Bernadette Cabrera
2015	Mac & Chiz	Candy
2015	Showbiz Konek na Konek	Host
2016–2019	ASAP	Herself / Performer
2017–2018	Pusong Ligaw	Margaret "Marga" Dimaawa
2018	Maalaala Mo Kaya: Kidney	Love
2018–2019	Halik	Aliyah Torres
2019	Maalaala Mo Kaya: Sinturon	Inna
2026	Cruz vs Cruz	Police Cpt. Antoinette Ferrer

== Accolades ==
=== Awards and nominations ===
Year	Award-giving body/Critics	Category	Results	Ref.
2012	38th Metro Manila Film Festival	SMDC Female Celebrity of the Night	Won	

== Personal ==
Bianca King is married to Ralph Wintle since 2021. She is now living in Australia as of 2022.
