= Marimar (2007 TV series) =

Philippine television drama series

- Title card
- Genre: Romantic drama
- Created by: Inés Rodena
- Based on: Marimar (1994) by Inés Rodena
- Developed by: Dode Cruz
- Written by: Benedict Miguel; Denoy Punio; Kit Villanueva-Langit
- Directed by: Joyce E. Bernal; Mac Alejandre
- Starring: Marian Rivera; Dingdong Dantes
- Voices of: Michael V. as Fulgoso; Rufa Mae Quinto as Fifi
- Theme music composer: Tata Betita
- Opening theme: "Marimar" by Regine Velasquez
- Ending theme: "Mahal Kita" by Maricris Garcia
- Country of origin: Philippines
- Original language: Tagalog
- No. of episodes: 155 + 4 specials

Production
- Executive producer: Wilma Galvante
- Production locations: Manila; Pampanga; Zambales
- Camera setup: Multiple-camera setup
- Running time: 30–45 minutes
- Production company: GMA Entertainment TV

Original release
- Network: GMA Network
- Release: August 13, 2007 – March 14, 2008

Related
- Marimar (2015)

Marimar is a Philippine television drama romance series broadcast by GMA Network. The series is based on a 1994 Mexican television series of the same title. Directed by Joyce E. Bernal and Mac Alejandre, it stars Marian Rivera in the title role and Dingdong Dantes. It premiered on August 13, 2007 on the network's Telebabad line up. The series concluded on March 14, 2008, with a total of 155 episodes.

== Cast and characters ==
Cast

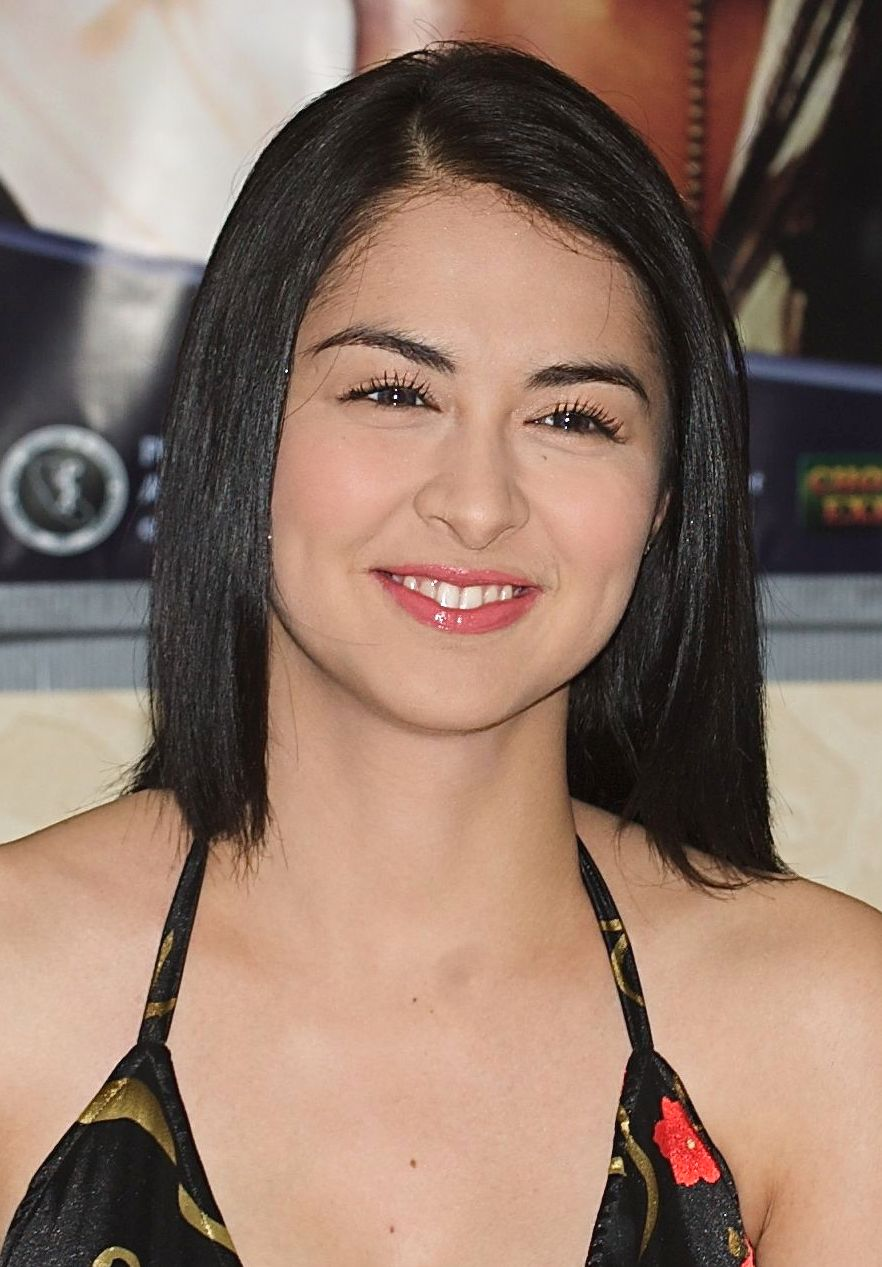
Marian Rivera

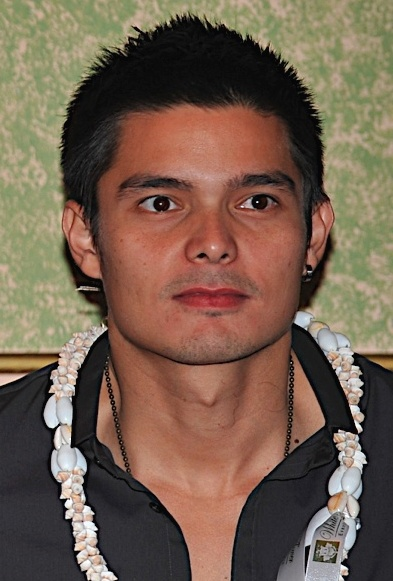
Dingdong Dantes

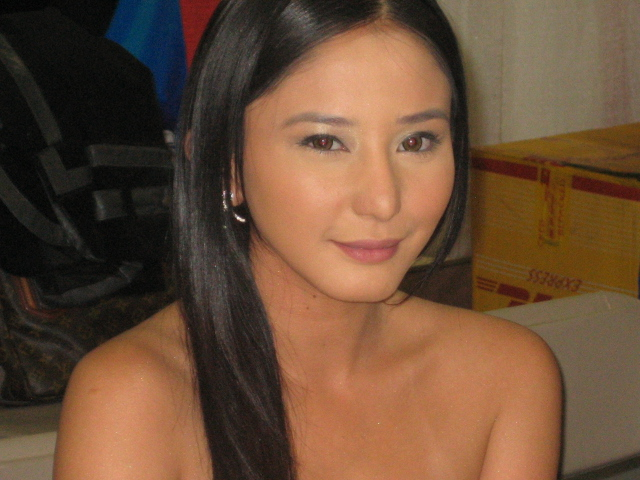
Katrina Halili

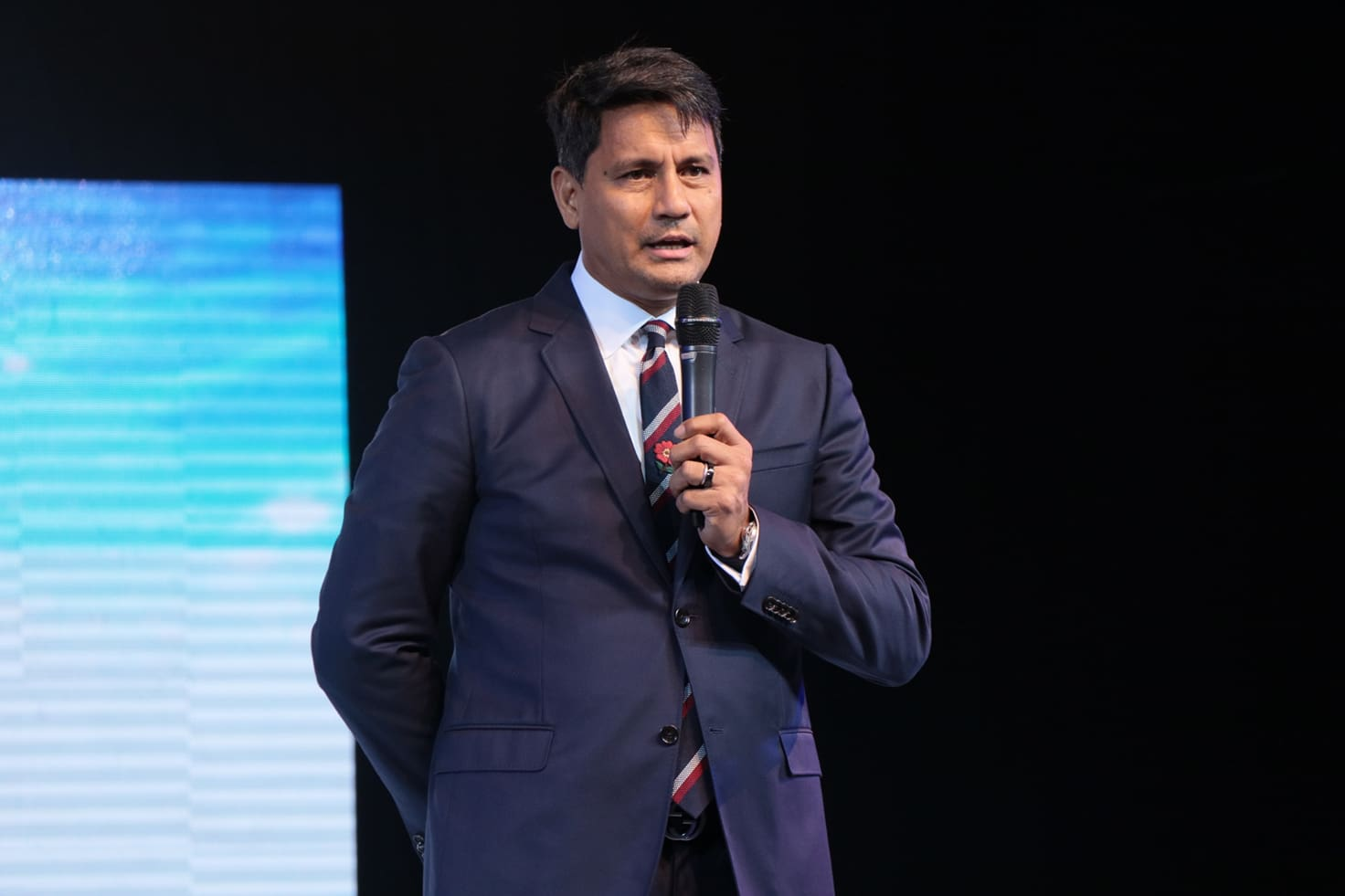
Richard Gomez

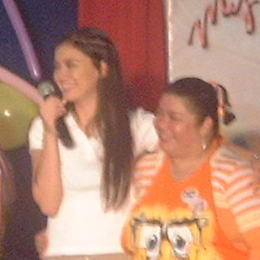
Nadine Samonte (left)

Lead cast

- Marian Rivera as Marimar Perez-Santibañez / Bella Aldama
- Dingdong Dantes as Sergio Santibañez

Supporting cast

- Katrina Halili as Angelika Santibañez / Angelika Aldama
- Richard Gomez as Renato Santibañez
- Jestoni Alarcon as Gustavo Aldama
- Rita Avila as Lupita Aldama
- Boboy Garovillo as Padre Porres
- Leo Martinez as Pancho Perez
- Caridad Sanchez as Cruz Perez
- Bing Loyzaga as Esperanza Aldama
- Michael V. as Fulgoso's voice
- Nigel as Fulgoso
- Manilyn Reynes as Corazon
- Gabby Eigenmann as Nicandro Mejia
- Sheena Halili as Monica
- Bianca King as Natalia Montenegro
- Marky Lopez as Arturo
- Rufa Mae Quinto as Fifi's voice / a wedding guest
- Nadine Samonte as Innocencia Arcega
- Mike Tan as Choi
- Mel Kimura as Perfecta

Recurring cast

- Arthur Solinap as Diego
- Marvin Agustin as Rodolfo San Jinez
- Francheska Salcedo as Cruzita Aldama–Santibañez
- Dino Guevarra as Antonio
- Carmina Villarroel as Rhia Concepcion
- Lani Mercado as Vanessa Mae Cruz
- Hayden Kho, Jr. as Hayden Miranda
- Paolo Paraiso as Carlitos Solis
- Shermaine Santiago as Brenda
- Victor Aliwalas as Adrian Alasco
- K Brosas as Rowena
- Pocholo Montes as Vitug
- Raquel Montessa as Leonor Arcega
- Joseph Ison as Rodrigo
- Mike Gayoso as Angelika's bodyguard

Guest cast

- Ella Cruz as younger Marimar
- Nicole Dulalia as younger Angelika
- Jaime Fabregas as Augusto Aldama
- Pilar Pilapil as Dolores Aldama
- Cristine Reyes as Kim Chan
- Irma Adlawan as Selva
- Soliman Cruz as Berto
- Bruno Folster as Bruno
- Gwen Garci as Olga
- Ailyn Luna as Cecilla
- Jan Marini as a DSWD officer
- Kirby de Jesus as a mental hospital patient
- Joanne Quintas as Jemma
- Ronnie Lazaro as Jose
- Chelsea Salcedo as Cruzita
- Wilma V. Galvante as a wedding guest
- Lily Monteverde as a wedding guest
- Consoliza Laguardia as a wedding guest
- German Moreno as a wedding guest
- Douglas Quijano as a wedding guest
- Ricky Reyes as a wedding guest
- Marky Cielo as a wedding guest
- LJ Reyes as a wedding guest
- Arci Muñoz as a wedding guest
- Annette Gozon-Abrogar as a wedding guest
- Tim Yap as a wedding guest
- Regine Velasquez as a wedding singer
- Ogie Alcasid as a wedding singer
- Dakila Cua (cameo)

== Development ==
Marimar is a 1994 Mexican television series starring Thalía, broadcast by Televisa. It later aired in the Philippines on March 11, 1996 through Radio Philippines Network. The network acquired the rights in 2007.

=== Casting ===
The lead role was first offered to actress Angel Locsin, which the actress rejected. The network was prompted to host auditions for the lead role. On March 13, 2008, a video of the fifteen actresses – Bianca King, Nadine Samonte, Jennylyn Mercado, Ryza Cenon, Jewel Mische, LJ Reyes, Rhian Ramos, Camille Prats, Pauleen Luna, Katrina Halili, Valerie Concepcion, Nancy Castiglione, Cheska Garcia and Karylle, all auditioned for the role of Marimar was leaked on YouTube. The role eventually went to Marian Rivera.

== Production ==
Principal photography commenced in July 2007. Filming took place in Manila, Pampanga and Zambales. Filming concluded in March 2008.

== Farewell special ==
A farewell special, "Marimar... Isang Pasasalamat" (transl. Marimar... one thank you) aired on March 9, 2008.

== Ratings ==
According to AGB Nielsen Philippines' Mega Manila household television ratings, the pilot episode of Marimar earned a 36.6% rating. The final episode scored a 52.6% rating which is the series' highest rating.

== Accolades ==
Accolades received by Marimar
Year	Award	Category	Recipient	Result	Ref.
2008	2008 Box Office Entertainment Awards	Most Popular TV Program	Marimar	Won	
2008	2008 Box Office Entertainment Awards	Most Popular TV Director	Mac Alejandre, Joyce E. Bernal	Won	
2008	2008 Box Office Entertainment Awards	Most Promising Female Star	Marian Rivera	Won	
2008	2008 Box Office Entertainment Awards	Phenomenal TV Star	Marian Rivera	Won	
2008	1st Filipino-American Visionary Awards	Favorite Television Actor	Dingdong Dantes	Won	
2008	1st Filipino-American Visionary Awards	Favorite Television Actress	Marian Rivera	Won	
2008	Nickelodeon Kids' Choice Awards Philippines	Favorite TV Show	Marimar	Won	
2008	4th USTv Students' Choice Awards	Most Popular Drama/Miniseries	Marimar	Won	
2008	4th USTv Students' Choice Awards	Most Popular Actor in a Drama/Miniseries	Dingdong Dantes	Won	
2008	4th USTv Students' Choice Awards	Most Popular Actress in a Drama/Miniseries	Marian Rivera	Won	
