= List of songs recorded by SexBomb Girls =

List of songs recorded by the Filipino pop group SexBomb Girls

This is a list of songs recorded by the Filipino pop group SexBomb Girls. The list includes tracks from studio albums, soundtrack contributions, singles, promotional recordings, and other officially released songs. Unless otherwise stated, all songs were recorded by SexBomb Girls as a group.

== Released songs ==
Song	Artist(s)	Writer(s)	Originating album	Year	Ref.
"Amoy ng Papa"	SexBomb Girls	Gigi Cordero; Roni Cordero	Bomb Thr3at	2004	
"Ang Gusto Namin"	SexBomb Girls	Lito Camo	Round 2	2003	
"Awitin Mo, Isasayaw Ko" (Note: "Awitin Mo, Isasayaw Ko" is a revival of the recording by VST & Company, originally released in 1978.)	SexBomb Girls	Vic Sotto; Joey de Leon	Sumayaw, Sumunod: The Best of Sexbomb Girls	2005	
"Baby, Ang Sarap"	SexBomb Girls	K. Hamaguchi; Lito Camo	Round 2	2003	
"Bakit Papa"	SexBomb Girls	Lito Camo; Erwin Dela Cruz	Unang Putok	2002	
"Choto Mate Kudasai" (Note: Choto Mate Kudasai is a translation of a single by the Japanese girl idol group S/mileage. It was released in Japan on February 1, 2012 and was translated in Tagalog by Raymund Ryan.)	SexBomb Girls	E. Carner; J. Nakashima	Round 2	2003	
"Chuvang Papa"	SexBomb Girls	Erwin Dela Cruz	Bomb Thr3at	2004	
"Crush Kita"	SexBomb Girls	Erwin Dela Cruz; Lito Camo	Unang Putok	2002	
"Daisy Siete" (Note: Daisy Siete is the sound track of a Philippine television drama anthology series broadcast by GMA Network of the same name starring the SexBomb Girls which run from 2003-2010 with a total of 26 seasons.)	SexBomb Girls	Lito Camo	Bomb Thr3at	2004	
"Dance Tayo 4Ever"	SexBomb Girls	Francis Magalona	Bomb Thr3at	2004	
"Dancing Queen" (Note: Dancing Queen is a cover of the famous ABBA song. It was originally written by ABBA members Benny Andersson, Björn Ulvaeus, and their manager Stig Anderson. The Sexbomb Girls recorded their popular version for the Philippine market.)	SexBomb Girls	Benny Andersson; Björn Ulvaeus; Stig Anderson	Unang Putok	2002	
"Di Ko Na Mapipigilan" (Note: "Di Ko Na Mapipigilan" is a Filipino cover of the Eurobeat song "Stop the Music," originally by Fun Factory. The writers of the original music are Claudio Accatino, Federico Rimonti, and Laurent Gelmetti, with the Filipino lyrics adapted by Lito Camo.)	SexBomb Girls	Lito Camo	Unang Putok	2002	
"Di Pwede Yan"	SexBomb Girls	Lito Camo	Round 2	2003	
"Echusa"	SexBomb Girls	Roni Cordero; Gigi Cordero	Bomb Thr3at	2004	
"Get Get Aw" (Note: "Get Get Aw" isn't an original composition; it's their catchy dance version and tribute to Tom Jones' hit song, "Sexbomb," with the core writers of the original Tom Jones track being Tom Jones and Mousse T.. The SexBomb Girls popularized their own rendition, incorporating their unique flair and the phrase "Get, Get, Aw!".)	SexBomb Girls	Tom Jones; Mousse T	Unang Putok	2002	
"Halukay Ube" (Note: "Get Get Aw" isn't an original composition; it's their catchy dance version and tribute to Tom Jones' hit song, "Sexbomb," with the core writers of the original Tom Jones track being Tom Jones and Mousse T.. The SexBomb Girls popularized their own rendition, incorporating their unique flair and the phrase "Get, Get, Aw!".)	SexBomb Girls	Lito Camo	Bomb Thr3at	2004	
"I'm Not That Girl"	SexBomb Girls	Lito Camo	Round 2	2003	
"Kahit Sino"	SexBomb Girls	Lito Camo	Round 2	2003	
"Kenkoy" (Note: "Kenkoy" is based on the iconic Philippine comic strip character Francisco "Kenkoy" Harabas, who was originally created in 1929 by writer Romualdo Ramos and illustrator Antonio "Tony" Velasquez.)	SexBomb Girls	Mike Hanopol	Round 2	2003	
"Kiss Sabay Hug"	SexBomb Girls	Erwin de la Cruz	Round 2	2003	
"Kung Ako'y Magkakajowa"	SexBomb Girls	Lito Camo	Round 2	2003	
"L.O.B."	SexBomb Girls	Lito Camo	Bomb Thr3at	2004	
"Lalaban Babawi"	SexBomb Girls	Raymund Ryan	Bomb Thr3at	2004	
"Lollipop"	SexBomb Girls	Barney Borja	Bomb Thr3at	2004	
"Loveless"	SexBomb Girls	Raymund Ryan	Round 2	2003	
"Lucky Girl"	SexBomb Girls	Lito Camo	Round 2	2003	
"Mama's Girl"	SexBomb Girls	Lito Camo	Round 2	2003	
"MAMA MAMA"	SexBomb Girls	Perry Lansigan	-	2026	
"Mickey" (Note: "Mickey" is a cover song adapted by Lito Camo & Papa V in the Philippines originally written by Mike Chapman & Nicky Chinn.)	SexBomb Girls	Mike Chapman; Nicky Chinn	Unang Putok	2002	
"Pretty Little Baby" (Note: "Pretty Little Baby" was written by a team including Lito Camo, Josephine Baker, Ben Bernie, Phil Baker, and Sid Silver, with Erwin de la Cruz as the arranger, though it's a popular Filipino version of a classic tune originally recorded by Connie Francis in 1962.)	SexBomb Girls	Lito Camo; Josephine Baker; Ben Bernie; Phil Baker; Sid Silver	Unang Putok	2002	
"Sex Bomb"	SexBomb Girls	Mousse T Errol Rennalls	Unang Putok	2002	
"Sige Sige"	SexBomb Girls featuring Janno Gibbs	Janno Gibbs	Round 2	2003	
"Sige Pa"	SexBomb Girls	Gigi Cordero; Roni Cordero	Bomb Thr3at	2004	
"Stupid Ka Rin"	SexBomb Girls	Lito Camo	Unang Putok	2002	
"Sumayaw Sumunod" (Note: "Sumayaw Sumunod" is a song by Filipino musical group Boyfriends, released on 1978, through Canary Records (now PolyEast Records). Written by Norman Caraan. The song was covered by The SexBomb Girls and released in 2005.)	SexBomb Girls	Norman Caraan	Sumayaw Sumunod: The Best of Sexbomb Girls	2005	
"Tequila"	SexBomb Girls	Norman Caraan	Unang Putok	2002	
"The Spageti Song"	SexBomb Girls featuring Joey de Leon	Lito Camo	Round 2	2003	
"Tong Song"	SexBomb Girls	Gigi Cordero; Roni Cordero	Bomb Thr3at	2004	
"Tulog Na Baby"	SexBomb Girls	Raymund Ryan	Unang Putok	2002	
"Upo Upo" (Note: “Upo Upo” draws on elements of the traditional Filipino folk song "Magtanim ay 'Di Biro" adapting its melody and theme into a modern novelty-pop context.)	SexBomb Girls	Francis Magalona	Bomb Thr3at	2004	
"Venus" (Note: "Venus" is a song by Dutch rock band Shocking Blue, released as a single in the Netherlands in 1969. Written by Robbie van Leeuwen, covered by SexBomb Girls in 2002 with additional Tagalog verses.)	SexBomb Girls	Robbie van Leeuwen	Unang Putok	2002	

== Daisy Siete Soundtrack ==
Season	Song	Singer	Writer(s)	Year	Ref.
1-6 Daisy Siete	"Daisy Siete"	SexBomb Girls	Lito Camo	2003	
7 - May Bukas Pa ang Kahapon	"Pangarap"	Danielle; Jovelle	Mark Guevarra	2004	
8 - Tahanan	"Tahanan"	Evette Pabalan; Nhiel Guillermo	Evette Pabalan	2005	
8 - Tahanan	"Kaibigan"	Danielle Ramirez; Jovelle Palomo; Jonathan Ong	Mark Guevarra	2005	
9 - Ang Pitong Maria	"Kaibigan"	Danielle Ramirez; Jovelle Palomo; Jonathan Ong	Mark Guevarra	2005	
8 - Ang Pitong Maria	"Magtatagpo Rin"	Rochelle Pangilinan; Jopay; Izzy Trazona; Evette Pabalan; Weng Ibarra; Jacque Estevez; Sunshine Garcia; Danielle Ramirez; Jovel Palomo	Mark Guevarra; Gloc-9; Jovel Palomo	2005	
10 - Sayaw ng Puso	"Sayaw ng Puso"	Evette Pabalan; Michael Cruz	Mark Guevarra	2006	
11 - Nasaan Ka?	"Nasaan Ka?" (Note: "Nasaan Ka?" is a cover, with the original classic Filipino kundiman song "Nasaan Ka Irog" composed by the Filipino composer Nicanor Abelardo, and its lyrics written by Narciso S. Asistio (Filipino) and Jesus Balmori (Spanish). The SexBomb Girls adapted this traditional piece into a pop version and released in 2006.)	Evette Pabalan; Jhorel Ramirez; Danielle Ramirez; Jovel Palomo	Nicanor Abelardo; Narciso S. Asistio; Jesus Balmori	2006	
12 - Landas	"Landas"	Rochelle Pangilinan; Jovelle Palomo	Mark Guevarra; Gloc-9	2006	
13 - Moshi Moshi Chikiyaki	"Moshi Moshi Chikiyaki"	SexBomb Girls; Jayne Iona Lim	Mark Guevarra	2006	
14 - Siete Siete, Mano Mano	"Ako"	Evette Pabalan	Lito Camo	2007	
15 - Isla Chikita	"Isla Chikita"	SexBomb Girls	Lito Camo	2007	
16 - Tabaching-ching	"Tabaching-ching"	Izzy Trazona	Lito Camo	2007	
17 - Ulingling	"Ulingling"	Rochelle Pangilinan; Mia Pangyarihan; Sunshine Garcia	Lito Camo	2007	
18 - Prince Charming and the Seven Maids	"Cha-cha"	Rochelle Pangilinan; Mia Pangyarihan; Sunshine Garcia; Weng Ibarra; Evette Pabalan; Mycah Bautista; Che-Che Tolentino	Lito Camo	2008	
19 - Vaklushii	"Vaklushii"	SexBomb Girls	Unknown	2008	
20 - Tinderella	"Tinderella"	SexBomb Girls	Unknown	2008	
21 - Tarzariray: Amasonang Kikay	"Tarzariray: Amasonang Kikay"	Evette Pabalan; Weng Ibarra; Jovel Palomo; Danielle Ramirez; Monic Icban; Izzy Trazona	Unknown	2009	
22 - Kambalilong	"Kambalilong"	Evette Pabalan; Weng Ibarra; Monic Icban; Izzy Trazona	Unknown	2009	
22 - Kambalilong	"Anyo ng Pag-ibig"	Evette Pabalan; Monic Icban	Unknown	2009	
24 - My Shuper Sweet Lover	"My Shuper Sweet Lover"	Jaja Barro	Lito Camo	2009	
25 - Bebeh and Me	"Bebe and Me"	Rochelle Pangilinan	Lito Camo	2010	
26 - Adam or Eve	"Adam or Eve"	Izzy Trazona	Unknown	2010	
