= Sumayaw, Sumunod (album) =

Sumayaw, Sumunod: The Best of the Sexbomb Girls

Compilation album by SexBomb Girls
- Released: April 18, 2005
- Recorded: 2002–2005
- Genre: Pop; Pinoy pop; novelty
- Length: 59:44
- Language: English; Tagalog
- Label: Sony BMG Music Entertainment; BMG Records (Pilipinas)
- Producer: Jonathan Ong; Robert Javier

SexBomb Girls chronology
Bomb Thr3at (2004)	Sumayaw, Sumunod: The Best of the Sexbomb Girls (2005)	Daisy Siete: V-Day (2006)

Sumayaw, Sumunod: The Best of the SexBomb Girls is a compilation album by Filipino girl group the SexBomb Girls, released on April 18, 2005, through Sony BMG Music Entertainment's Musiko Records imprint. The album features 17 tracks, including a selection of the group's popular songs from earlier studio albums as well as newly recorded versions of older songs. The album was certified platinum by the Philippine Association of the Record Industry (PARI).

== Background and release ==
The compilation was issued following the group's commercial success in the early to mid-2000s with their studio albums Unang Putok (2002), Round 2 (2003), and Bomb Thr3at (2004). It includes hits such as "The Spageti Song", "Bakit Papa", and "Pretty Little Baby" that had become staples of the group's repertoire. The album also features cover versions of the Manila sound songs "Sumayaw Sumunod" and "Awitin Mo at Isasayaw Ko".

The release of Sumayaw, Sumunod: The Best of the Sexbomb Girls coincided with a lineup change in the group's singing unit as Monic and Mariam left the group in 2004. This album introduced Che-Che Tolentino to the SexBomb Singers.

== Certification and reception ==
The album was certified platinum by the Philippine Association of the Record Industry (PARI).

== Track listing ==
Sumayaw, Sumunod: The Best of SexBomb Girls track listing
No.	Title	Writer(s)	Producer(s)	Length
1.	"Sumayaw, Sumunod (Note: "Sumayaw, Sumunod" is a dance-pop rendition by SexBomb Girls of the Manila sound song written by Norman Caraan, originally sung by Boyfriends and released in 1978.)"	Norman Caraan	Jonathan Ong; Robert Javier	2:58
2.	"Awitin Mo at Isasayaw Ko (Note: "Awitin Mo at Isasayaw Ko" is a Manila sound disco song by the Filipino group VST & Company, released in 1978.)"	Vic Sotto; Joey de Leon	Jonathan Ong; Robert Javier	2:59
3.	"The Spageti Song" (featuring Joey de Leon)	Lito Camo	Lito Camo	3:52
4.	"Bakit Papa?"	Lito Camo; Erwin Dela Cruz	Papa Zu	3:33
5.	"Pretty Little Baby"	Lito Camo; Bill Nauman; Don Stirling	Papa Zu	2:57
6.	"Crush Kita"	Erwin Dela Cruz; Lito Camo	Papa Zu	3:26
7.	"Di Ko Na Mapipigilan"	Lito Camo	Papa Zu	3:47
8.	"Tulog Na Baby"	Raymund Ryan	Papa Zu	3:31
9.	"Ang Gusto Namin"	Lito Camo	Lito Camo	3:23
10.	"Choto Mate Kudasai"	J. Nakashima; E. Carner; Raymund Ryan	Papa Zu	4:08
11.	"Loveless"	Raymund Ryan	Papa Zu	3:25
12.	"Kiss Sabay Hug"	Erwin Dela Cruz	Papa Zu	2:47
13.	"Halukay Ube (Note: "Halukay Ube" contains "Apir, Disapir, 1/2, 1/4", a popular Filipino children's hand-clapping game and chant, often performed as "Apir, disapir, 1/2, 1/4, 1/4, 1/2, disapir, apir". It is a rhythmic game involving alternating high-fives ("apir", from the English "up here") and hiding hands ("disapir" or disappear).)" (featuring Joey de Leon)	Lito Camo	Lito Camo	4:15
14.	"Tong Song"	Gigi Corder; Roni Cordero	Papa V	3:44
15.	"Daisy Siete"	Lito Camo	Lito Camo	4:13
16.	"Amoy ng Papa"	Gigi Corder; Roni Cordero	Papa V	3:26
17.	"Dance Tayo 4Ever"	Francis Magalona	Francis Magalona	4:36
Total length:				59:44

== Release history ==
Release dates and formats for Bomb Threat
Region	Date	Format	Label	Ref.
Philippines	April 18, 2005	CD	Sony BMG Music Entertainment	
Philippines	April 18, 2005	cassette	Sony BMG Music Entertainment	
