= Bomb Threat (SexBomb Girls album) =

Studio album by SexBomb Girls
- Released: May 18, 2004
- Recorded: 2004
- Genre: Pop; Pinoy pop; novelty
- Length: 43:19
- Language: English; Tagalog
- Label: BMG Records (Pilipinas)
- Producer: Rudy Y. Tee

SexBomb Girls chronology
Round 2 (2003)	Bomb Threat (2004)	Sumayaw, Sumunod: The Best of SexBomb Girls (2005)

Bomb Threat (stylized as Bomb Thr3at on the album cover) is the third studio album by Filipino girl group the SexBomb Girls, released on May 18, 2004 through BMG Records (Pilipinas) under its Musiko Records imprint. The album followed the group's earlier commercial successes with Unang Putok (2002) and Round 2 (2003). The album spawned the hit song "Halukay Ube" featuring Joey de Leon and received double platinum certification in the Philippines.

== Background and release ==
The album was announced and promoted in mid-2004, with a launch event featuring production performances and music video promotions on the noontime show Eat Bulaga!. BMG Records framed the release as a continuation of the group's novelty-pop direction, adding original tracks composed for the group. The album was produced by Rudy Y. Tee. The superhero-themed album cover was conceptualized by Arnold Arre and Cynthia Bauzon Arre. The album tracks were recorded at Freq Foundation, Pink Noise Studios, Prodigi Recording Studio and Winner Studio. The album was launched in a Quezon City bar with the group doing production numbers and a video to promote the album, which carries a superhero theme.

On the album, the SexBomb Girls explored a range of musical themes and styles, incorporating contemporary Filipino pop ("Dance Tayo 4ever"), ballads ("Daisy Siete"), and novelty tracks with rural and agricultural motifs ("Upo Upo"). The song "Upo Upo" draws on elements of the traditional Filipino folk song "Magtanim ay 'Di Biro" adapting its melody and theme into a modern novelty-pop context. These tracks reflected the group's use of familiar cultural references and everyday imagery to appeal to a broad Filipino audience.

== Track listing ==
Bomb Threat track listing
No.	Title	Writer(s)	Producer(s)	Length
1.	"Halukay Ube (Note: "Halukay Ube" contains "Apir, Disapir, 1/2, 1/4", a popular Filipino children's hand-clapping game and chant, often performed as "Apir, disapir, 1/2, 1/4, 1/4, 1/2, disapir, apir". It is a rhythmic game involving alternating high-fives ("apir," from English "up here") and hiding hands ("disapir" or disappear).)" (featuring Joey de Leon)	Lito Camo	Lito Camo	4:15
2.	"Tong Song"	Gigi Corder; Roni Cordero	Papa V	3:44
3.	"L.O.B. (Laban o Bawi)"	Lito Camo	Lito Camo	3:38
4.	"Amoy ng Papa"	Gigi Corder; Roni Cordero	Papa V	3:26
5.	"Sige Pa"	Gigi Corder; Roni Cordero	Papa Zu	3:22
6.	"Chuvang Papa"	Erwin de la Cruz	Papa V	3:19
7.	"Daisy Siete"	Lito Camo	Lito Camo	4:13
8.	"Dance Tayo 4Ever"	Francis Magalona	Francis Magalona	4:36
9.	"Lollipop"	Barney Borja	Papa V	3:24
10.	"Lalaban Babawi"	Raymund Ryan	Papa V	2:51
11.	"Upo Upo (Note: "Upo Upo" plays around the traditional Tagalog folk song "Magtanim ay 'Di Biro" ((transl. "Planting rice is not a joke") composed by Felipe de León.)"	Francis Magalona	Francis Magalona	3:03
12.	"Echusa"	Gigi Corder; Roni Cordero	Papa V	3:23
Total length:				43:19

== Commercial performance ==
Bomb Threat received a double platinum certification from the Philippine Association of the Record Industry (PARI), reflecting significant domestic sales.

== Release history ==
Release dates and formats for Bomb Threat
Region	Date	Format	Label	Ref.
Philippines	May 18, 2004	CD	BMG Records (Pilipinas)	
Philippines	May 18, 2004	cassette	BMG Records (Pilipinas)	
