= Round 2 =

Round 2 may refer to:

- Round 2 (J. Holiday album), 2009
- Round 2 (The Stylistics album), 1972
- Round 2 (company), a toy company based in Indiana, United States
- Round 2 (SexBomb Girls album), 2003
