= Pretty Little Baby (Connie Francis song) =

1962 song by Connie Francis

- French cover art

Single by Connie Francis

from the album Connie Francis Sings "Second Hand Love" & Other Hits
- A-side: "I'm Gonna Be Warm This Winter"
- Released: May 16, 2025 (single); 1962 (album)
- Recorded: 1961
- Genre: Easy listening
- Length: 2:22
- Label: MGM; Republic
- Songwriters: Don Stirling; Bill Nauman
- Producers: Jim Vienneau; Norro Wilson

Connie Francis singles chronology
"Heartbreak Hotel (re-recorded)" (2016)	"Pretty Little Baby" (2025)

Audio sample
- file; help

"Pretty Little Baby" is a song written by Don Stirling and Bill Nauman for American singer Connie Francis. Produced by Jim Vienneau and Norro Wilson, it was included in her 1962 MGM Records album Connie Francis Sings Second Hand Love & Other Hits. Following a viral moment by being featured in videos shared on social media websites such as TikTok, Instagram, and YouTube, it made its debut chart appearances in various regions around the world 63 years after its original release.

== Overview ==
"Pretty Little Baby" was one of the 40 songs Connie Francis had recorded during several recording sessions at MGM Records over four days in August 1961, eventually selected for inclusion in Connie Francis Sings "Second Hand Love". Released as the seventh and final single from Connie Francis Sings on May 16, 2025, it was originally included as a B-side on the UK release of her single "I'm Gonna Be Warm This Winter" (1962) to avoid competition with the single's performance.

"Pretty Little Baby" made its appearance in various charts after being featured in viral videos on social media platforms, such as TikTok, where it garnered over 10 billion cumulative streams as of May 2025. On the music platform Spotify, it has finally collected over 100 million streams as her most streamed song on the app. This has led Republic Records, MGM's successor, to reissue versions originally sung by Francis in languages such as French, German, Italian, Spanish, Swedish and Japanese, when MGM was hoping to make it a hit outside of the United States.

Francis was 24 when she had recorded the song, and was 87 years old when it went viral in 2025, after she retired from the music industry. Upon the chart debut of "Pretty Little Baby", she was surprised, as she was previously unfamiliar with social media, originally remarking "What's viral? What's that?" She and her publicist later enlisted her publicist's son to assist in creating an account for her. Francis had also initially forgotten the song's existence (she had only remembered it upon listening to it again), but nevertheless thanked her supporters, and was grateful that even kindergarteners had become familiar with her music, describing it as "thrilling". Francis subsequently died in July of the same year due to declining health, in the midst of the song's resurgence.

== International versions ==
All tracks are written by Bill Newman and Don Stirling, who were credited as the composers for the translated versions. Commissioned translators of the original lyrics were credited as its lyricists.

Title	Translator(s)	Length
"Pretty Little Baby"		2:22
Pretty Little Baby (La Seule qui t'aime) (French version)	Hubert Ithier & Pierre Amel	2:16
"Pretty Little Baby (可愛いベイビー)" (Japanese version)	Kenji Sazanami	2:21
"Pretty Little Baby (Linda muchachita)" (Spanish version)	Javier Valdés	2:18
"Pretty Little Baby (Alle jungen Leute)" (German version)	Fini Busch	2:17
"Pretty Little Baby (Baby)" (Italian version)	Umberto Bertini	2:16
"Pretty Little Baby (Sjunger på svenska)" (Swedish version)	Dan Ryde	2:15

== Charts ==
Chart performance for "Pretty Little Baby"
Chart (2025)	Peak position
Global 200 (Billboard)	132
India International (IMI)	5
Philippines Hot 100 (Billboard Philippines)	99
UK Singles Sales (OCC)	80
UK Singles Downloads (OCC)	76
US Bubbling Under Hot 100 (Billboard)	13

== Release history ==
List of releases of "Pretty Little Baby"
Region	Date	Format	Label	Catalog number	Ref.
Various	1962	B-side	MGM	45-MGM-1185	
Various	2025	International versions	Republic	USUM71120288	

== SexBomb Girls version ==
"Pretty Little Baby"

Song by SexBomb Girls

from the album Unang Putok
- Released: July 26, 2002
- Recorded: 2002
- Genre: Dance-pop, novelty
- Label: BMG Philippines
- Songwriters: Don Stirling, Bill Nauman, Lito Camo

Filipino girl group SexBomb Girls recorded their version of "Pretty Little Baby" in 2002 which was released as part of the group's debut studio album Unang Putok. The song forms part of the group's early novelty pop and dance repertoire produced during their rise in Philippine popular music.

=== Background and composition ===
The SexBomb Girls' adaptation of "Pretty Little Baby" contains new lyrics in Tagalog written by Filipino songwriter and producer Lito Camo, who served as the principal composer for the SexBomb Girls during their early career. The song incorporates dance-pop and novelty music elements, consistent with the group's recordings released in the early 2000s.

=== Release ===
The song was released commercially in the Philippines in 2002 through BMG Records (Pilipinas) as part of Unang Putok. It was distributed alongside other tracks from the album, including "Bakit Papa?".

"Pretty Little Baby" was later included on the group's compilation album Sumayaw, Sumunod: The Best of SexBomb Girls (2005).

=== Reception ===
The song has been cited in Philippine media retrospectives discussing the SexBomb Girls' recorded output, where it is listed among the group's recorded songs from their early releases. Rolling Stone Philippines described the song as one of the group's most notable recordings. The publication noted that the SexBomb Girls demonstrated how a Western pop standard could be localized through ad-libs, comedic banter, novelty elements, and contemporary pop culture references. It further highlighted the inclusion of the "Tom Cruise" line as an unexpected lyrical insertion that functioned as a punchline and contributed to distinguishing the group’s version from the original recording.

The song continues to appear in catalog listings, digital music platforms, and compilation albums featuring the SexBomb Girls' recordings from the early 2000s.

== Other versions ==
- Japanese singer Mie Nakao covered the song as "Kawaii Baby" (可愛いベイビー) in 1962.
