= Boyfriends (Filipino band) =

Filipino musical group

- Origin: Quezon City, Philippines
- Genres: Manila sound; disco
- Years active: 1978–1995; 1999–present
- Label: PolyEast Records
- Members: Bob Guzman; Gary Ariola; Lloyd Sale
- Past members: Joey Abando; Artie Ilacad

Boyfriends is a musical group from the Philippines. Their heyday was in the 1978 as one of the most prominent bands of the Manila sound, with pop and disco harmonies reminiscent of the Bee Gees. Several of their recordings are among the most popular Tagalog and English songs of the Philippines from the late 1970s and early 1980s, and have since been covered by a number of the Philippines' most popular singers, among others.

Drummer Art (Artie) Ilacad, who was later executive producer at OctoArts Films, founded by his brother Orly, died from heart surgery complications on July 30, 2023.

== Band members ==
=== Current members ===
- Bob Guzman - lead vocals, lead guitar (1978–1995, 1999–present)
- Gary Ariola - co-lead vocals, acoustic and rhythm guitars (1978–1995, 1999–present)
- Lloyd Sale - keyboards (1999–present)

=== Early members ===
- Joey Abando - lead vocals, acoustic (1978–1979, 1995 reunion)
- Artie Ilacad - drums, backing vocals (1978–1995, 1999–2023; his death)

== Discography ==
=== Albums ===
==== Studio albums ====
- Dahil Mahal Kita (1978, Canary Records)
- With Love (1978, Canary Records)
- 3 (1979, Canary Records)
- Forever (1981, Canary Records)
- First Love (1983, Canary Records)
- Unplugged Reunion Album (1995, OctoArts-EMI)
- Akustik (1999, OctoArts-EMI)

==== Compilation albums ====
- Best of the Boyfriends (1980, Canary Records)
- Greatest Hits (1981, Canary Records)
- The Story Of: Boyfriends (The Ultimate OPM Collection) (2001, EMI Philippines)
- Greatest Hits (2014, PolyEast Records)

== Notable songs ==
- "Bakit Labis Kitang Mahal"

Covered by Lea Salonga on her album Lea, as well as by Dingdong Avanzado and Martin Nievera.

- "Dahil Mahal Kita"

Listed by Ogie Alcasid as one of the ten "most memorable songs of his life". He recorded it as the theme song for the Vilma Santos movie Dolzura Cortez Story. It was also used as the theme song for the TV series Guns and Roses, in a recording by Jovit Baldivino. A notable cover version sung in the drama Be My Lady on ABS-CBN performed by the fictional Crisostomo family portrayed by Erich Gonzales, Al Tantay, Janice de Belen, Yves Flores, RK Bagatsing and Nonoy Frolian.

- "Nais Kong Malaman Mo"

Covers by Manilyn Reynes, Keempee de Leon, and, most recently, Ken Chan.

- "Sumayaw, Sumunod"

Anthologized in Bongga (The Biggest OPM Retro Hits). Covered by Ogie Alcasid., and also covered by Sexbomb Girls and all-Filipino global boy group, Hori7on.

- "Salawahan" written by Victorio "James" Guiwan

Covered by Ogie Alcasid feat. Urban Flow, from Alcasid's 10th Anniversary album (1998).

- "Sa Tuwing Ako'y Nag-iisa"
- "First Love Never Dies"

Covered by Filipino Jukebox Rock Band White Lies

- "Mamahalin Kita"
- "Dance With Me" (also covered by Dingdong Avanzado in 1992)
- "Pagtibok Ng Puso"
- "Bistado Na Kita"
- "Araw-Araw"
- "I Think I'm In Love"
- "Kay Ganda Palang Umibig"
- "Oras-Oras"
- "Bumalik Ka Lamang" written by Victorio "James" Guiwan
- "Paano Ko Sasabihin"
- "Umaapoy"
