= The Spageti Song =

Song by SexBomb Girls featuring Joey De Leon

from the album Round 2
- Released: August 2003
- Recorded: 2003
- Genre: Pop, dance, novelty
- Length: 3:51
- Label: Musiko, BMG Records (Philippines)
- Songwriter: Lito Camo
- Producer: Lito Camo

"The Spageti Song" is a song by the Filipino pop and dance group SexBomb Girls, featuring Filipino television host and entertainer Joey De Leon. It was released in August 2003 on their second studio album Round 2 and later on the compilation album Sumayaw, Sumunod: The Best of SexBomb Girls (2005). The song is an example of novelty dance music from Philippine television variety shows during the early 2000s.

== Background ==
The SexBomb Girls rose to prominence in the early 2000s after appearing as backup dancers on the long-running Philippine daytime variety show Eat Bulaga!. Their television exposure led to a recording career. Their music consists of dance-oriented and novelty tracks.

The entertainment publication Lifestyle Inquirer described the group as "the epitome of a P-pop girl group long before the term even became colloquial. They arguably set the foundation and have become the formula inspiration for many groups that followed: Viva Hot Babes, Mocha Girls, and EB Babes, to name a few." An article in Gaby Gloria also cites them in the origins of P-pop.

"The Spageti Song" was written and produced by Lito Camo.

== Cultural impact ==
Rolling Stone Philippines argued that the song was one which helped the group's rise to prominence during that period.

The song led to a nationwide dance craze. The song's hook and accompanying dance routine were adopted in public performances and social gatherings, including school events, office programs, and community celebrations.

The song has also been referenced in later television segments and reunion appearances involving former members of the group.

== Credits and personnel ==
- SexBomb Girls – lead performers
- Joey De Leon – featured performer
- Lito Camo – songwriter, producer
