= Sumayaw Sumunod =

Song by Boyfriends

from the album With Love
- Language: Filipino
- Released: January 6, 1978
- Genre: Manila sound
- Length: 3:17
- Label: Canary
- Songwriter: Norman Caraan

"Sumayaw Sumunod" is a song by Filipino musical group Boyfriends, released on January 6, 1978, through Canary Records (now PolyEast Records). Written by Norman Caraan, the song is the opening track of their second studio album With Love.

== Background and release ==
The song spawned various covers and renditions from artists such as Ogie Alcasid, Nyoy Volante, Sexbomb Girls, and Hori7on.

== Hori7on version ==
"Sumayaw Sumunod"
- Digital cover

Single by Hori7on

from the album Daytour 2
- Language: Filipino; Korean
- English title: "Dance and Follow"
- Released: August 13, 2024
- Length: 3:15
- Label: MLD
- Songwriters: Marcus Cabais; Norman Caraan; Jaejun; Jiseong; Kim Jun Tae

Hori7on singles chronology
"Lucky" (2024)	"Sumayaw Sumunod" (2024)

Music video
- "Sumayaw Sumunod" on YouTube

South Korea-based boy band Hori7on recorded a cover of "Sumayaw Sumunod" for their second single album Daytour 2 (2024). It was released on August 13, 2024, through MLD Entertainment.

=== Composition ===
The Hori7on rendition of "Sumayaw Sumunod" has a runtime of three minutes and 15 seconds. Composed by Kim Jun-tae, Jaejun, and Marcus, with an arrangement by Jiseong and Jaejun, the track is written the key of A major, with an average tempo of 63 beats per minute. In an interview with the Inquirer, leader Vinci recalled that covering the song allowed them to explore the nuances of the Filipino language with the company of Korean producers to create a naturally-sounding output. The cover includes rapped-through verses written by Marcus and Reyster.

=== Promotion and release ===
On August 4, 2024, Hori7on released graphics captioned with the text "Gusto niyo bang makisayaw?" (Do you want to dance with us?) and "Coming Soon" to announce their follow-up release to Daytour (2024). "Sumayaw Sumunod" was released as Hori7on's fourth single on August 13, with an accompanying music video. The single was supported by full Filipino-language and English-language versions of the track, as well as its instrumental.

Hori7on promoted the single on the variety show Eat Bulaga! on August 21.

=== Track listing ===
1. "Sumayaw Sumunod" – 3:15
2. "Sumayaw Sumunod" (Tagalog version) – 3:15
3. "Sumayaw Sumunod" (English version) – 3:15
4. "Sumayaw Sumunod" (instrumental) – 3:15

=== Credits and personnel ===
Credits are adapted from Apple Music.

- Hori7on – vocals
- Norman Caraan – lyrics
- Kim Jun-tae – lyrics
- Lee Jae-jun – lyrics, arrangement
- Marcus – lyrics

== Release history ==
Release history for "Sumayaw Sumunod"
Region	Artist	Date	Format	Version	Label
Various	Hori7on	August 13, 2024	Digital download; streaming	Original	MLD
Various	Hori7on	August 13, 2024	Digital download; streaming	Tagalog	MLD
Various	Hori7on	August 13, 2024	Digital download; streaming	English	MLD
Various	Hori7on	August 13, 2024	Digital download; streaming	Instrumental	MLD
