= Magtanim ay 'Di Biro =

Filipino folk song

- by Felipe de León
- English: "Planting rice is not a joke" (Note: lit. '"Planting rice is not a joke"')
- Language: Tagalog
- Dedication: Farmers

Magtanim ay 'Di Biro (transl. "Planting rice is not a joke", and known in its English title as Planting Rice) is a popular Tagalog folk song composed by Felipe de León. The song tells of the struggles of farmers, how one must twist and bend to plant rice in the muddy paddies all day, with no chance to sit nor stand.

== Lyrics ==
Magtanim ay 'di biro
Maghapong nakayuko
'Di naman makatayo
'Di naman makaupo

Braso ko'y namamanhid
Baywang ko'y nangangawit
Binti ko'y namimitig
Sa pagkababad sa tubig

Sa umagang paggising
Ang lahat iisipin
Kung saan may patanim
May masarap na pagkain

Braso ko'y namamanhid
Baywang ko'y nangangawit
Binti ko'y namimitig
Sa pagkababad sa tubig

Halina, halina, mga kaliyag
Tayo'y magsipag-unat-unat
Magpanibago tayo ng lakas
Para sa araw ng bukas
Para sa araw ng bukas

== In popular culture ==
The song was first recorded in mixed Tagalog and English by Katy de la Cruz in the United States in the 1920s. A Chinese version with the title Planting Rice was released in 1962 as part of Rebecca Pan's album Oriental Pearls. The version also included Tagalog and English lyrics.
