= Unang Putok =

Studio album by SexBomb Girls
- Released: July 26, 2002
- Recorded: 2002
- Genres: Pop; Pinoy pop; novelty
- Length: 36:55
- Languages: English; Tagalog
- Label: BMG Records (Pilipinas)
- Producers: Lito Camo; Papa V

SexBomb Girls chronology
Unang Putok (2002)	Round 2 (2003)

Unang Putok is the debut studio album of Filipino girl group the SexBomb Girls, released on July 26, 2002, through BMG Records (Pilipinas) Inc., under its Musiko Records imprint and produced by Lito Camo and Papa V. The album marked the group's transition from television dancers on the noontime show Eat Bulaga! to recording artists with widespread commercial success.

The album contains ten tracks, including the hit song "Bakit Papa?". The album was a commercial success in the Philippine market, achieving quadruple platinum certification (4× platinum) by the Philippine Association of the Record Industry (PARI).

== Background and release ==
Prior to the release of Unang Putok, the SexBomb Girls were primarily known as a troupe of backup dancers on the long-running Philippine noontime variety show Eat Bulaga! on GMA Network. Formed in 1999 by choreographer Joy Cancio, the group gained early attention for their high-energy routines and interactive chants such as "Get! Get! Aw!" and "Laban o Bawi", becoming regulars on the show's popular segments and gradually building a massive fan following among television audiences.

The first attempt of creating a singing compartment for SexBomb occurred in 2001 with Rochelle Pangilinan (the group leader), Jopay Paguia, Evette Pabalan, Weng Ibarra, Izzy Trazona, Sugar Mercado and Aibee Chiongson. However, due to Chiongson and Mercado's departure from the group, this first attempt dissolved quickly. In 2002, their management again attempted to form two groups separating the singers and dancers, hence, the SexBomb Singers and the SexBomb Dancers were formed. The SexBomb Dancers was headed by Aira Bermudez while the SexBomb Singers was headed by main leader Rochelle Pangilinan. The final singers consisted of Rochelle Pangilinan, Evette Pabalan, Jopay Paguia, Weng Ibarra, Monic Icban and Izzy Trazona. Collectively, the SexBomb Singers are still called the SexBomb Girls on all release and promotional materials.

As commentators noted, the group's move from background dancers to novelty recording artists was a key shift that amplified their cultural impact beyond Eat Bulaga! and laid the groundwork for their debut album. The album was produced by songwriter Lito Camo and Papa V and was released in the Philippines on July 26, 2002, with "Bakit Papa?" as the album's most well-known track.

"Bakit Papa?" was already being played and performed ahead of the full album and quickly gained traction through frequent exposure on Eat Bulaga!, where it was regularly performed with accompanying choreography. The song's repetitive hook and call-and-response structure made it particularly suited to mass participation, contributing to its rapid spread among television viewers and live audiences.

== Track listing ==
Unang Putok track listing
No.	Title	Writer(s)	Producer(s)	Length
1.	"Bakit Papa?"	Lito Camo; Erwin Dela Cruz	Papa Zu	3:33
2.	"Pretty Little Baby"	Don Stirling; Bill Nauman; Camo	Zu	2:57
3.	"Crush Kita"	Dela Cruz; Camo	Zu	3:26
4.	"Stupid Ka Rin"	Camo	Papa V; Camo	4:49
5.	"Dancing Queen"	Benny Andersson; Björn Ulvaeus; Stig Anderson	Rudy Y. Tee	3:49
6.	"Venus"	Robbie van Leeuwen; Camo	V; Camo	3:50
7.	"Di Ko Na Mapipigilan"	Claudio Accatino; Federico Rimonti; Laurent Gelmetti; Camo	Zu	3:47
8.	"Tulog Na Baby"	Raymund Ryan	Zu	3:31
9.	"Tequila"	Chuck Rio; Norman Caraan	V; Camo	3:01
10.	"Mickey"	Mike Chapman; Nicky Chinn	V; Camo	4:08
Total length:				36:55

=== Adaptations and cover versions ===
- "Pretty Little Baby" is a cover of the 1962 song originally recorded by American pop singer Connie Francis. The SexBomb Girls' rendition reinterprets the song in a dance-pop and novelty-pop style with the verses rewritten in Tagalog.
- "Venus" is a cover of the song originally recorded by the Dutch group Shocking Blue and later popularized internationally by English girl group Bananarama. The SexBomb Girls' rendition also showcases Tagalog lyrics.
- "Dancing Queen" is a cover of the 1970s disco hit by Swedish pop group ABBA.
- "Mickey" is a cover of the early 1980s pop/new wave hit originally recorded by Tony Basil, which in turn is a cover of the 1979 song "Kitty" by English band Racey.
- "Tequila" is a cover of the 1958 instrumental hit originally recorded by the Champs. The song was adapted into a dance-oriented novelty track, retaining the recognizable hook.
- "Di Ko Na Mapipigilan" is a Tagalog cover of the 1992 Eurobeat song "Stop the Music" by Italian singer Sophie.

== Commercial performance ==
Unang Putok itself was a major commercial success, earning quadruple platinum certification (4× platinum) from the Philippine Association of the Record Industry (PARI) or sales of over 120,000 units — a significant achievement for a debut pop album in the Philippines in the early 2000s. This achievement established the group as recording artists in their own right and signaled a successful transition from their origins as dancers to fully featured performers in the OPM scene.

== Release history ==
Release dates and formats for Unang Putok
Region	Date	Format	Label	Ref.
Philippines	July 26, 2002	CD	BMG Records (Pilipinas)	
Philippines	July 26, 2002	cassette	BMG Records (Pilipinas)	
