= Philippine folk music =

Music genre

- Stylistic origins: Folk music
- Cultural origins: Individual ethnic groups in the Philippines
- Typical instruments: Agung; gangsa; kulintang
- Derivative forms: Bodabil; kundiman; Manila Sound; Pinoy reggae; tagonggo

Other topics
- OPM; Kundiman

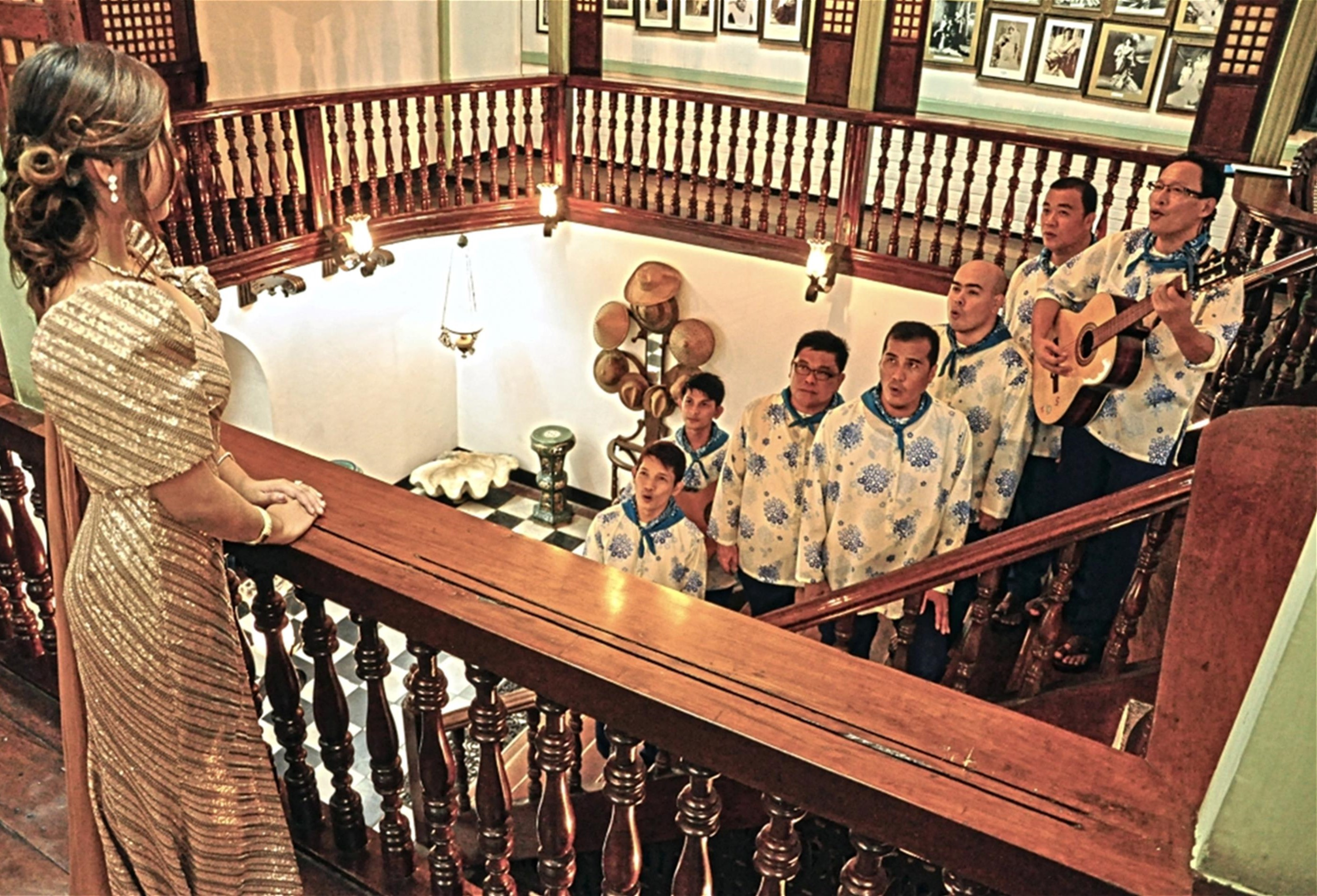
Harana band a traditional way of serenade in the Philippines.

The traditional music of the Philippines reflects the Philippines' diverse culture, originating from more than 100 ethnolinguistic groups and shaped by a widely varying historical and sociocultural milieu.

== Classification ==
Traditional Filipino music is reflective of the country's history as a melting pot of different cultures, both western and eastern. Among the dominant cultural strains noticeable today are Hispanic, American and to some extent Chinese, Indian and Islamic. It is thus difficult to strictly classify the whole corpus of Philippine music.

A frequently used system is to classify it according to ethno-linguistic or cultural divisions: for example, traditional Tagalog music, which is somewhat more Hispanic in flavour, differs from Ifugao music and Maranao kulintang music.

Ethnomusicologists such as Ramon Santos and Corazon Canave-Dioquino typically identify three distinct traditions or "repertoires" of traditional Filipino music:

1. Indigenous traditions, also referred to as "Asiatic traditions" and as "Indigenous Philippine music";
2. Spanish-European Influenced Traditions also referred to as "Westernized folk traditions" or "lowland Christianized folk traditions"; and
3. American Influenced Traditions, including western-influenced art and popular music, and semi classical music.

Forms

Traditional Filipino music is also sometimes categorized according to form, with one categorization being:

- Strophic/unitary form
- Binary form
- Ternary form
- Rondo form

== Indigenous Philippine music ==
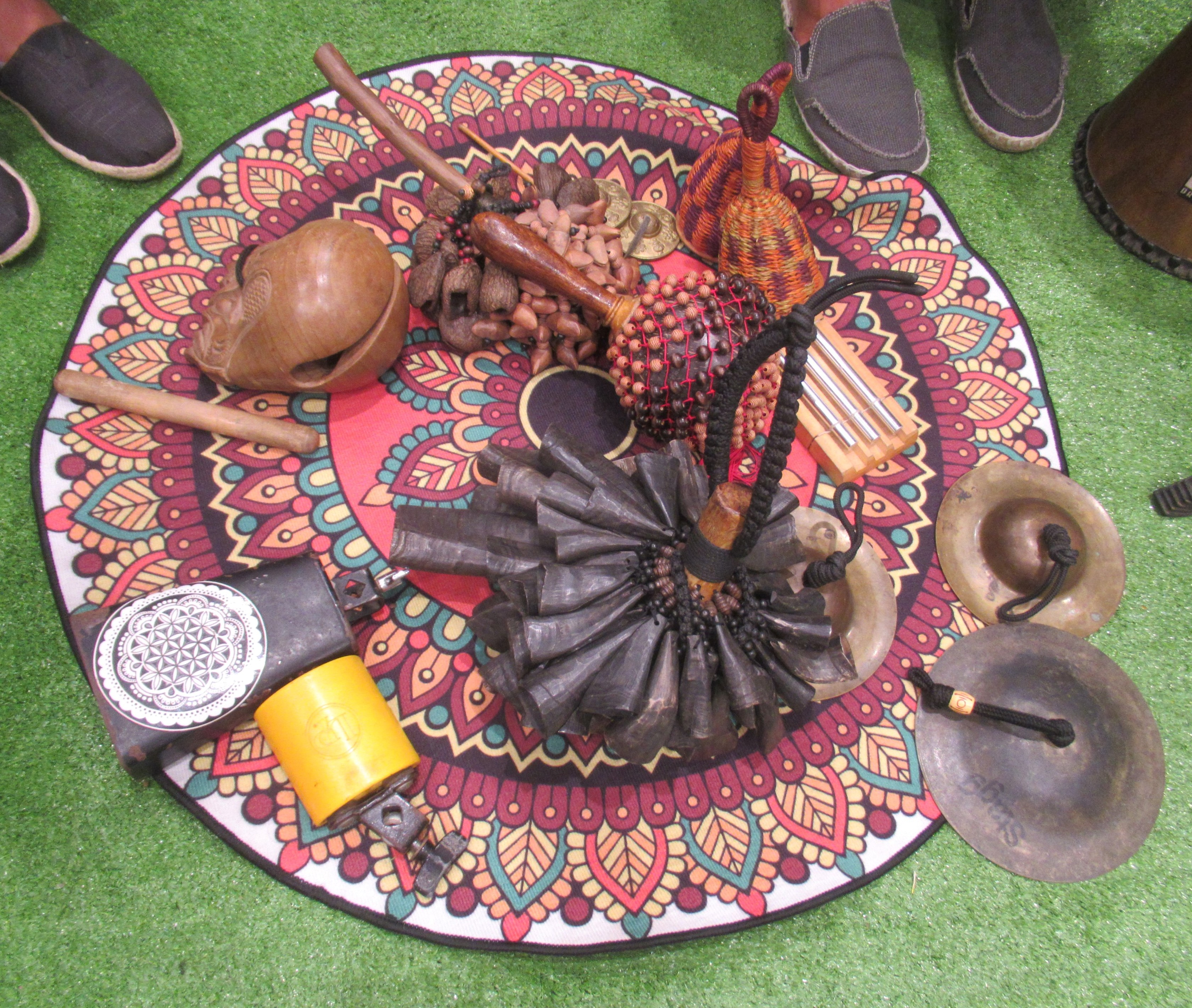
Folk music musical instruments

The music of the Philippines' many Indigenous peoples are associated with the various occasions that shape life in indigenous communities, including day-to-day activities as well as major life-events, which typically include "birth, initiation and graduation ceremonies; courtship and marriage; death and funeral rites; hunting, fishing, planting and harvest; healing and various forms of armed conflicts."

Ethnomusicologists such as Ramon Santos note that Indigenous Philippine music forms closely related to the cultural traditions of Southeast Asia. And since Indigenous Philippine music is typically transmitted orally within the community, Santos refers to the Indigenous Philippine music repertoire as part of "Asiatic oral traditions."

Santos also notes that the majority of these musical performances involve "the participation of the community or audience" and with "dancing and some form of physical movement." The notable exception is in instances of solo playing or small group singing, which do not necessarily involve much physical movement.

== Spanish-influenced traditional music ==
Aside from the music of Indigenous peoples, another major Philippine folk music tradition is the "Spanish influenced" tradition associated with the Philippines' lowland majority peoples.

Some of these musical forms, notably the metrical romances, were introduced during the Philippines' Spanish period of rule, and later adopted and adapted by local artists. Others are "syncretic and hybrid forms" - such as the subli and sanghiyang - which were assimilated from Western religious traditions. Yet others are westernized versions of tunes dating to the Philippine precolonial period, with notable examples including "planting songs, children's play songs, lullabies, love songs and serenades."

Due to the cultural dominance of the Philippines' lowland majority peoples, these westernized lowland traditions often monopolizes the label of "Philippine folk music."

== American-influenced traditional music ==
The Philippines' American colonial period, which lasted from 1898 to 1946, saw another period of transformation in Philippine music. Santos notes that much of Filipino art music, popular music, as well as semi-classical music predominantly fall under this repertoire.

Many of the developments during this period were influenced by the formal training received by musicians from music schools established in the early days of the American colonial regime. Earlier musical forms evolved further, as was the case of the Kundiman, which was widely adapted as an art song, further differentiating it from its predecessor, the Kumintang.

== Vocal music ==
A commonality is that vocal music is of significant import to every ethnic group in the country. Although there are some music intended for dance, the best-preserved form of traditional music is that intended for the voice, with chanting epic poetry as having been the earliest form and later augmented by instrumental accompaniment. Regarded to have a wide range, as most of them stretch more than an octave, they are still considered within the capacity of even an average singer.

== Dance music ==
Dance music is an important form of traditional Philippine music. The best form of preserved music are those with lyrics and for music intended to accompany a dance. According to Francisca Reyes-Aquino, known for her voluminous collection of folk dances, people watching the dance sing the songs in the same way that cheerers chant in a game. This is very evident especially in songs where interjections Ay!, Aruy-Aruy!, Uy! and Hmp! are present, such as Paru-parong Bukid.

Music falling under this category may be classified as those belonging to Christianized Groups, Muslim Groups, and the other Ethnic Groups.

=== Dance music among Christianized ethnicities ===
As Christianity was introduced to the Philippines, Dance Music classified as belonging to the Christianized Groups are somewhat related to Western music as well. Dance Music falling under this category may also be called Habanera, Jota, Fandango, Polka, Curacha, etc. and has the same characteristics as each namesakes in the Western Hemisphere.

However, there are also Indigenous forms like the Balitao, Tinikling and Cariñosa (the national dance). In a study by National Artist for Music Dr. Antonio Molina, the Balitao, famous in Tagalog and Visayan regions, employs a 3/4 time signature with a "crotchet-quaver-quaver-crotchet" beat. Others use the "crotchet-minim" scheme, while others use the "dotted quaver-semiquaver-crotchet-quaver-quaver" scheme.

This type of music is generally recreational and, like traditional music from the West, is used for socialising.

=== Dance music among southern Muslim ethnicities ===
The court and folk dance music of the Muslim-Filipino groups have preserved ancient Southeast Asian musical instruments, modes and repertoires lost to Hispanicized islands further north. Stricter interpretations of Islam do not condone musical entertainment, and thus the musical genres among the Muslimized Filipinos cannot be considered "Islamic".

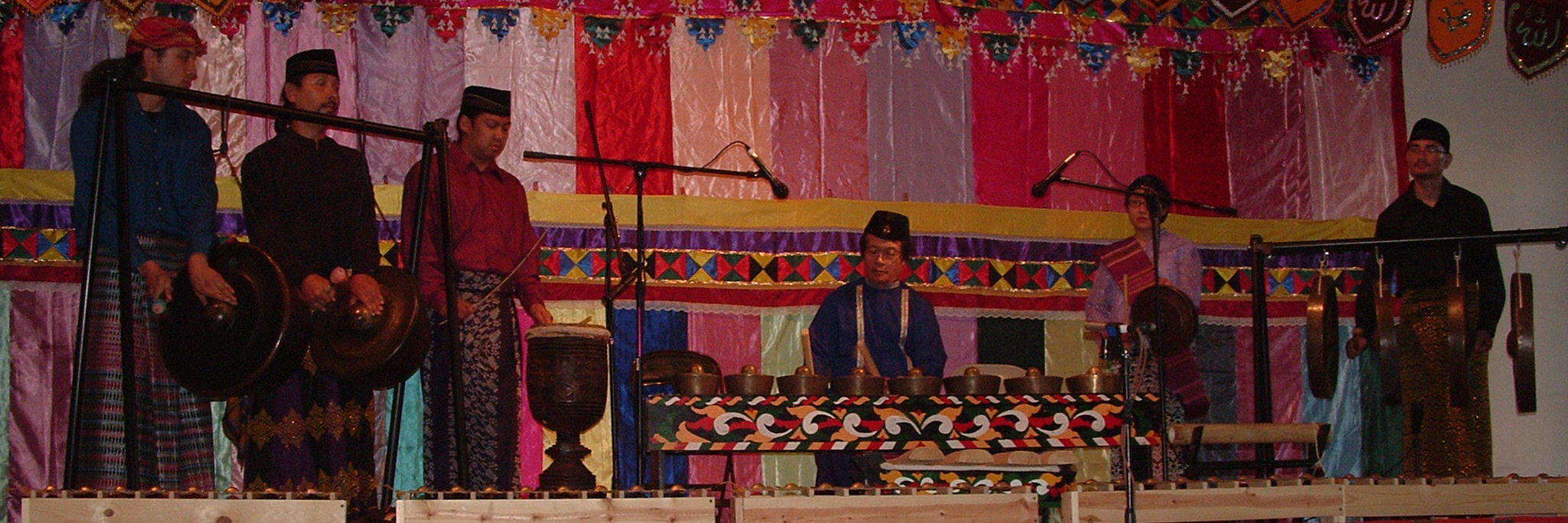
Kulintang ensemble of the Mindanao people

Genres shares characteristics with other Southeast-Asian court and folk music: Indonesian Gamelan, Thai Piphat, Malay Caklempong, Okinawan Min'yō and to a lesser extent, through cultural transference through the rest of Southeast Asia, is comparable even to the music of the remote Indian Sub-Continent.

Generally, music falling under this category tells a story. An example is the Singkil, which relates an episode from the Darangen (the Maranao version of the ancient Indian epic, the Ramayana). The dance recounts the story of Putri Gandingan (Sita) as she was saved by Rajahmuda Bantugan (Rama) from crashing rocks, represented by bamboo poles. The Singkil is considered the most famous in the Philippines under this category for its perceived elegance, and is also performed by Filipinos from other ethnic groups throughout the country.

Music is related in war in some regions in the country, as it is a way to show the emotions of victory and defeat, as well as the resolution of conflict. Philippine music also depends on the biographical factors: in cooler regions such as the Cordilleras, the beat of the music is so slower, while in warmer areas it is quite fast.

=== Dance music among other indigenous ethnicities ===
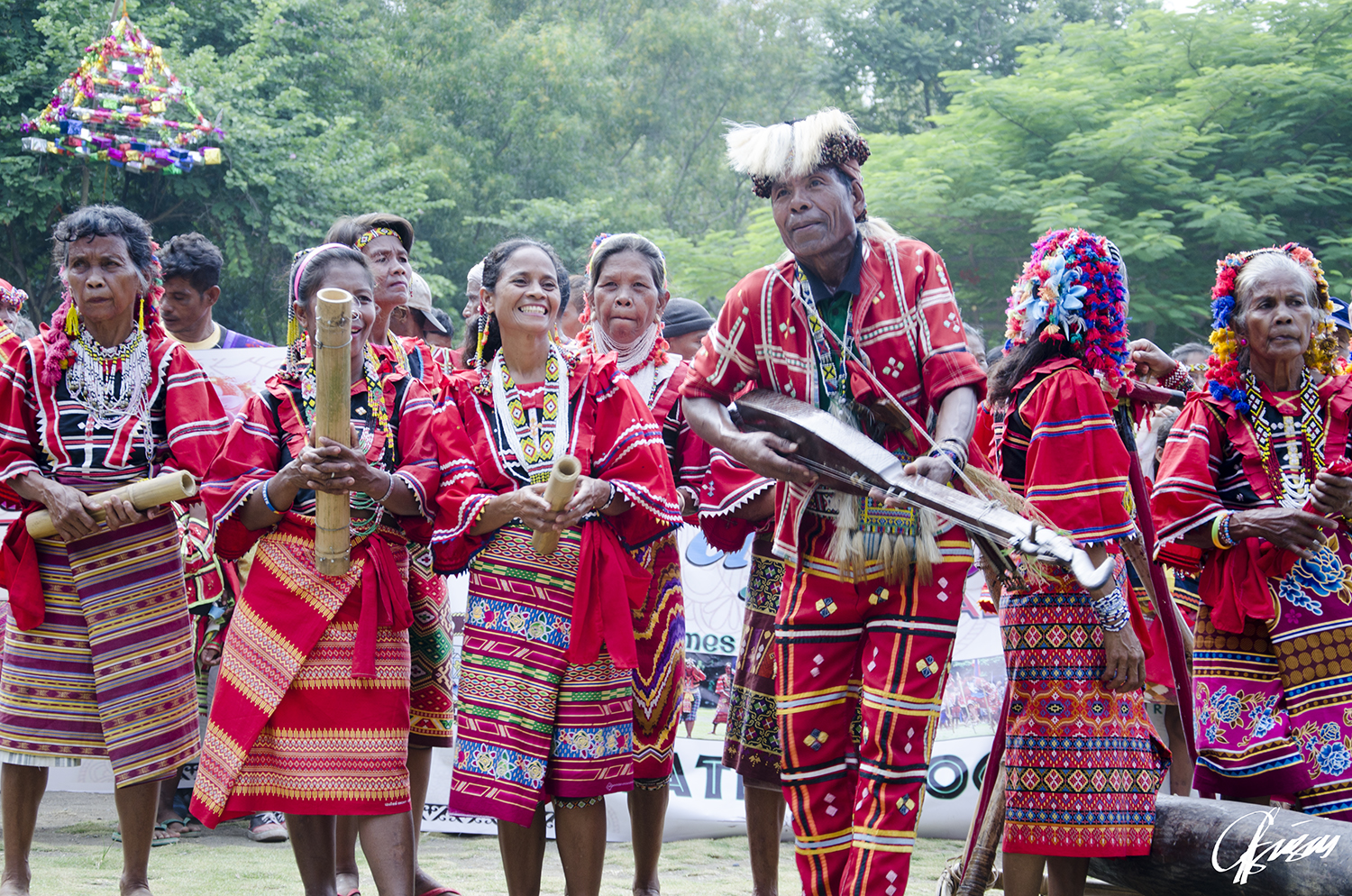
Bagobo people with their instruments at the Kadayawan Festival.

Like secular songs from the same group, this form of music has a sort of beat, even though it is hard to put it in a form of time signature. Percussions are mainly used for these types of music and sometimes, a gong is enough.

As closeness to Nature is a main feature of these ethnic groups, one can expect that dance steps falling under this category are a mimicry of the movements of plants and animals of a certain locality. Some music is simply called the 'Monkey Dance' or the 'Robin Dance' for identification.

Some of the music falling under this category is ritual music: thus there are dances used for marriage, worship, and even preparation for a war.

== Popularity ==
Video compact discs of some popular Ilocano folk songs.

Unlike folk music in Ireland, Hungary, the Czech Republic and neighbouring Malaysia, traditional music in the Philippines has never reached contemporary popularity. Perhaps, it is partly due to the fact every region of the Philippines has its own language, and several decades of Americanisation.

Though some groups tried to collect songs from the different ethnolinguistic groups, none has so far succeeded in making traditional music a part of the national identity, much more a national symbol. It is rarely taught in elementary school, as in Ireland, aside from children's songs. This results in a mentality that traditional songs are children's songs.

The decline was accelerated with the entry of television, making popular culture from Europe and the United States easily accessible to a common Filipino. Though most Europeans would say that Filipinos are music-loving people, traditional music is always at risk of being left in oblivion.

== Ethnomusicology ==
Attempts have been made to collect and preserve traditional Philippine music, though no collection of the traditional music was ever made. There are however studies made regarding this subject in the late 19th century, when the Romanticists of Europe began to find the value of folk songs.

Even during the American Era, attempts to collect traditional music came rather late. Perhaps the first collection was in 1919 by Fr. Morice Vanoverberg, which is focused on the traditional music of the Lepanto Igorots of the north. Unfortunately, only the words and not the tunes are included in the collection.

The collection entitled Filipino Folk Songs by Emilia Cavan is considered to be the earliest collection with tunes, published in 1924. Perhaps, the most important collection of folk songs is the Philippine Progressive Music Series by Norberto Romualdez, published in the late 1920s.

Unfortunately, the collectors who worked with Romualdez did not present the songs in their original languages but rather translated them into English and Filipino. This collection also included some songs aimed to promote national identity, like the national anthem of the Philippines, "Philippines Our Native Land" and even "Philippines the Beautiful" (an adaptation of "America the Beautiful"). The collection also included some folk songs from other countries.

For a period of time, Romualdez's collection became the textbook for teaching music in primary school. It also ensured that folk tunes from every part of the country was preserved to be passed to the next generation of Filipinos. Until now, this collection remains to be the most important collection of traditional music from the Philippines, since a copy of it is still available in major municipal and provincial libraries in the country.

Other collections like the Filipino Folk Songs by Emilia Reysio-Cruz caters to the so-called 'eight major languages' of the country and according to some, the collection is the best representation of the songs from these ethnolinguistic groups.

Dr. Jose Maceda, former chair of the Department of Asian Music Research of the College of Music of the University of the Philippines, also did some collections which began in 1953 and lasted until 1972. This was followed by collections from his students as well.

During the last years of the 20th century until the early 21st century, Raul Sunico, Dean of the Conservatory of Music of the University of Santo Tomas, published his own collection. He began with publishing a collection of lullabies, followed by love songs, then by work songs. Finally, he published a collection of songs about Filipino women, a major topic of traditional songs from all the ethnolinguistic groups. All these collections were arranged for the piano and the words are given in their original languages. A translation is also supplied, not to mention a brief backgrounder about the culture of the specific ethnic groups.

With regard to traditional dance music, the seven volume collection of Francisca Reyes-Aquino is still the most important collection. None has yet followed her lead until now.

== Linguistics of traditional music ==
Borromeo also noted that one interesting feature of Western-influenced traditional music is that a tune is not bound to a particular language or dialect.

Many songs in the different Philippine languages, however, share the same tune, such as the Tagalog Magtanim ay 'Di Biro, Kapampangan Deting Tanaman Pale and the Gaddang So Payao. Another example is the Visayan song Ako Ining Kailu, which has the same melody as the Ibanag Melogo y Aya and Kapampangan Ing Manai.

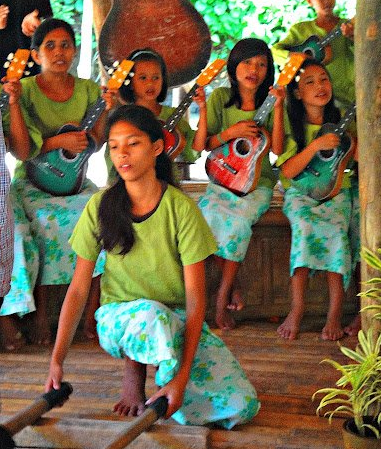
Filipina girls playing Philippine folk music

The largest body of songs are those using the various vernacular languages, especially the eight major languages in the country. Many of the collected traditional songs have a translation in Filipino, the national language.

Songs from the various minority languages rank second in recognition, while those in Spanish rank third. This does not include the closest local language to Spanish, called Chavacano, which has a degree of mutual intelligibility with Castilian. The most famous songs in this classification are perhaps No Te Vayas de Zamboanga and Viva! Señor Sto. Niño.

== Folk music in Philippine education ==
The curriculum of the Department of Education in the Philippines discusses the value of music and art in learning as a "means to celebrate Filipino cultural identity and diversity.” Philippine Art and Music Education is embedded in the curriculum. Students in their 7th grade have folk music integrated into their education. A teacher's guide released by the Department of Education Schools Division of Bataan details the lesson plan for Music in Grade 7. The guide lists objectives that include analyzing musical elements in Philippine folk music and identifying the relationship among the music, people and culture of a given region.

In May 2020, over 30 teachers, in the central part of Luzon, worked on a book entitled Revisiting the Folk Songs of Region III: a Kaleidoscope of Rich Cultural Heritage with the intention of “reviewing and reviving” 124 folk songs. According to the Department of Education director Nicolas Capulong, this book “helps students develop their sense of cultural identity.” Capulong mentions that the book makes classroom folk song tutorials easier because it includes chords, vocal guides, short videos, and an instrumental backing. Before this book, teachers relied on a collection of folk songs from 1983 that Department of Education Symphonic Band conductor Rafael Rubio says has limitations.

== Relationship with popular music ==
=== Folk rock in the Philippines ===
Some Philippine rock icons from the 1970s tried to record folk songs. Florante, Freddie Aguilar, Heber Bartolome, Joey Ayala and the group Asin propagated Filipino folk songs akin to the phenomenon in the United States.

Another popular music category, influenced by Traditional Filipino music but not rooted in the American folk rock tradition of the 70s, is that of "contemporary music using Filipino instruments," an example of which is UDD's song "Paagi," which was used as the theme song for the animated adaptation of the comic book series Trese.

=== Philippine contemporary folk (world) music ===
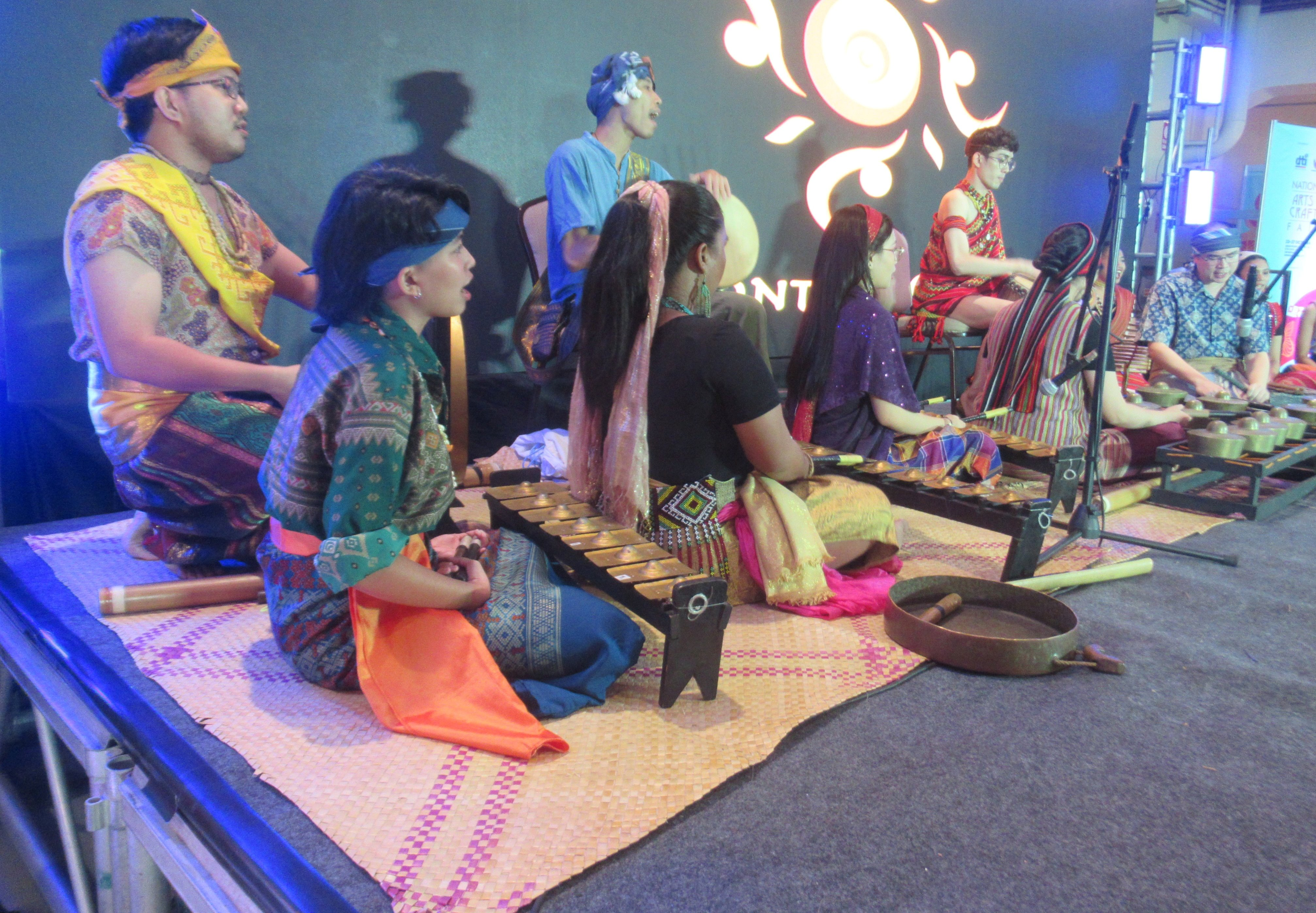
Kontra-Gapi, UP-CAL

The increasing commercial viability of Contemporary Folk Music in the 1980s created new opportunities for Philippine Artists to introduce Traditional Filipino musical concepts and instruments to a popular audience. Globally popularized under the label "world music" to distinguish it from folk rock, its most popular practitioners include University of the Philippines Professor Edru Abraham and group Kontra-Gapi (short for Kontemporaryong Gamelan Pilipino), Ethnomusicologist Grace Nono, and world music band Pinikpikan (since renamed Kalayo). In 2017, Kontra-GaPi created a folk cover rendition of Game of Thrones' theme music. In 2024, it performed the kulintang and Moro dances at the 12th Active Vista Human Rights Festival.

Musical acts incorporating other world music traditions while retaining Philippine folk music elements, sometimes labeled world fusion, include Humanfolk and Maquiling Ensemble, while the more prominently folk-focused Folk Rock acts, such as Pordalab, Bayang Barrios, Bullet Dumas, and Mijon are often also categorized as "Filipino world music" acts.

=== Philippine folk music as protest music ===
Because the global popularity of folk rock and of world music forms such as reggae coincided with the Vietnam War, and with the Marcos dictatorship in the Philippines, the 70s also saw the rise of protest music as a folk music tradition, with an increased interest in traditional nationalistic songs such as the kundiman "Bayan Ko", the rise of folk rock protest acts such as Heber Bartolome and Jess Santiago within the resistance against the Marcos dictatorship, and the infusion of nationalist themes, although more subdued, in mainstream musical acts such as Freddie Aguilar and the APO Hiking Society.

=== Adaptations of Filipino folk songs ===
Several Filipino artists have recorded adaptations of Filipino folk songs.

In 2014, artists Kitchie Nadal and Bullet Dumas collaborated on a contemporary recording of the traditional Waray language song "Idoy, Uday" as part of the relief effort for victims of Typhoon Haiyan the year before.

In October 2020, a Philippine beer brand Red Horse launched an ad campaign that focused on paying tribute to Philippine folk songs. The campaign was tagged as an “aim to show how rock can be used to bridge old music to the appreciation of today’s generation.” The campaign featured rock band Mayonnaise and heavy metal band Slapshock. They gave their own take on classical, folk songs entitled Alak and Ugoy sa Duyan. In July 2021, the band Debonair District released an EP Diyalogo that merges the genre of jazz and folk. Toma Cayabyab, their lead vocalist, said that they arranged the songs with the hopes of “making the younger generation appreciate and love Filipino music.”
