= Round 2 (SexBomb Girls album) =

Studio album by SexBomb Girls
- Released: August 2003
- Recorded: 2002–2003
- Genres: Pop; Pinoy pop; novelty
- Length: 41:40
- Languages: English; Tagalog
- Label: BMG Philippines
- Producer: Rudy Y. Tee

SexBomb Girls chronology
Unang Putok (2002)	Round 2 (2003)	Bomb Thr3at (2004)

Round 2 is the second studio album by Filipino girl group SexBomb Girls, released in 2003 through BMG Records Philippines, under its Musiko Records imprint. Building on the commercial success of their debut Unang Putok (2002), the album further cemented the group's status as leading figures in early-2000s Philippine novelty pop and television-driven dance music.

The album is best known for producing the hit song "The Spageti Song", which became a nationwide dance craze and one of the most recognizable novelty songs of the decade in the Philippines. The album was a massive commercial success and was awarded quintuple platinum (5x) certification by the Philippine Association of the Record Industry (PARI).

== Background and release ==
Following the commercial breakthrough of Unang Putok in 2002, the SexBomb Girls experienced increased demand for music releases alongside their continued dominance on the noontime variety show Eat Bulaga!. Their growing visibility on daily television translated into strong public recognition, prompting the group's management and record label to produce a sophomore album within a year of their debut. The album was produced by Rudy Y. Tee and the album concept was curated by Mario Joson. The album tracks were recorded at Freq Foundation, Pink Noise Studios, Prodigi Recording Studio and Winner Studio. Round 2 was released in August 2003 and promoted extensively through regular appearances in mall shows, on Eat Bulaga! and on other Philippine television programs.

By this period, the SexBomb Girls had transitioned from being primarily backup dancers into full-fledged recording artists, with their music frequently promoted through televised performances, live appearances, and choreography-driven segments.

== Track listing ==
Round 2 track listing
No.	Title	Writer(s)	Producer(s)	Length
1.	"The Spageti Song" (featuring Joey de Leon)	Lito Camo	Lito Camo	3:47
2.	"Kahit Sino"	Lito Camo	Lito Camo	4:29
3.	"Kiss Sabay Hug"	Erwin Dela Cruz	Papa Zu	2:47
4.	"Loveless"	Raymund Ryan	Papa Zu	3:25
5.	"Sige, Sige" (featuring Janno Gibbs)	Janno Gibbs	Janno Gibbs	3:21
6.	"Di Pwede Yan!"	Lito Camo; Harry Belafonte; Irving Burgie; William Attaway	Papa Zu	2:59
7.	"Baby, Ang Sarap"	Lito Camo; K. Hamaguchi	Papa Zu	2:38
8.	"Ang Gusto Namin"	Lito Camo	Lito Camo	3:23
9.	"I'm Not That Girl"	Lito Camo	Lito Camo	4:00
10.	"Choto Mate Kudasai"	J. Nakashima; E. Carner; Raymund Ryan	Papa Zu	4:08
11.	"Mama's Girl"	Lito Camo	Lito Camo	3:59
12.	"Kung Akoy Magkakajowa"	Lito Camo	Lito Camo	3:54
Total length:				41:40

== Commercial performance ==
Round 2 achieved quintuple platinum (5× platinum) certification from the Philippine Association of the Record Industry (PARI), making it one of the best-selling Filipino albums of the early 2000s. The album's commercial success further solidified the SexBomb Girls' position as the best-selling girl group in the Philippines during that period and catapulted SexBomb Girls as the best-selling girl group in Asia until they were dethroned in 2011 by the emergence of K-pop.

== Release history ==
Release dates and formats for Round 2
Region	Date	Format	Label	Ref.
Philippines	August 2003	CD	BMG Records (Pilipinas)	
Philippines	August 2003	cassette	BMG Records (Pilipinas)	
