= Bakit Papa =

"Bakit Papa?"

Song by SexBomb Girls

from the album Unang Putok
- Released: July 26, 2002
- Recorded: 2002
- Genre: Dance-pop, novelty
- Length: 3:33
- Label: BMG Records (Pilipinas)
- Songwriter: Lito Camo
- Producer: Lito Camo

Music video
- "Bakit Papa?" on YouTube

"Bakit Papa?" (trans. "Why, Papa?") is a 2002 novelty pop song by Filipino girl group the SexBomb Girls, from their debut studio album Unang Putok. Written and composed by Lito Camo, the track is characterized by its catchy hook, playful lyrics, and repetitive chant structure, which helped make it one of the group's earliest and most recognizable hits and played a key role in establishing them as recording artists beyond their variety show origins on Eat Bulaga!. The song's popularity led to a feature film adaptation of the same name starring the group and prominent Filipino actors, and it has endured as a cultural touchstone in Philippine pop music. Over two decades later, the song continues to influence artists, with a 2023 R&B-inflected version released by the P-Pop girl group YARA, illustrating its lasting appeal across generations.

== Background and composition ==
The song was written and composed by Lito Camo, a known Filipino novelty songwriter during the period. He penned several early hits for the SexBomb Girls. “Bakit Papa?” blends upbeat pop sensibilities with humorous, conversational lyrics that engage with themes of love and rejection in a light-hearted manner. Its repetitive chant-like structure and easy-to-learn melody contributed to its popularity in performance contexts and community dance events following its release.The song's repetitive hook "laban-laban" and "bawi-bawi", and call-and-response structure made it particularly suited to mass participation, contributing to its rapid spread among television viewers and live audiences.

== Film ==
Due to the song's popularity, the SexBomb Girls starred in a Philippine feature film titled "Bakit Papa?" released in 2002, which used the track as its soundtrack and narrative inspiration. The film featured the group alongside established actors such as Richard Gutierrez, Allan K., Chynna Ortaleza and Wendell Ramos. The film was directed by Uro Dela Cruz and was distributed in theaters in the Philippines under Regal Entertainment on December 4, 2002.

In 2026, the song is used as the official soundtrack of the film "Midnight Girls" that focuses on friendship, sisterhood and the lives of female entertainers, starring Jodi Sta. Maria, Sanya Lopez, Loisa Andalio and Jane Oineza.

== Live performances ==
"Bakit Papa?" has been performed by the SexBomb Girls in various live settings, both during the group's original run in the early 2000s and in later reunion events.In 2025, the song was performed by the group during the Howlers Manila Music Festival. The song was also included in the setlists of their Get, Get, Aw!: The SexBomb Concert series, a major reunion concert tour beginning in December 2025 and continuing into early 2026.

== Legacy and influence ==
"Bakit Papa?" is widely cited as one of the early singles that helped define the SexBomb Girls’ transition from television dancers to mainstream pop performers. Its influence has persisted decades after its initial release, with commentators noting that it remains emblematic of early-2000s Filipino pop music trends and novelty dance culture.

=== 2023 YARA revival ===
In 2023, the contemporary Filipino pop (P-Pop) girl group YARA released a modern R&B-inflected remake of “Bakit Papa?”, bringing the classic hit to a new generation of listeners and reaffirming its enduring cultural appeal within the Philippine pop scene. Compared to the high-energy and high-pitched melody of the original song, YARA's version has a more R&B take, where the original "Laban-laban o bawi-bawi? Laban-laban o bawi-bawi? Get, get, aw!" chant is sung with a slower tempo.

=== Parody and popular culture ===
The influence of “Bakit Papa?” and the broader SexBomb Girls phenomenon extended into Filipino comedy. On the long-running GMA Network sketch show Bubble Gang, a parody dance group called the Sexballs Dancers performed satirical versions of SexBomb Girls songs. One notable parody was titled "Bakit Mama?", a comedic take on the original "Bakit Papa?", performed by the Sexballs as part of the show's recurring sketches mocking popular dance acts of the time.
