= SexBomb Girls =

Filipino girl group

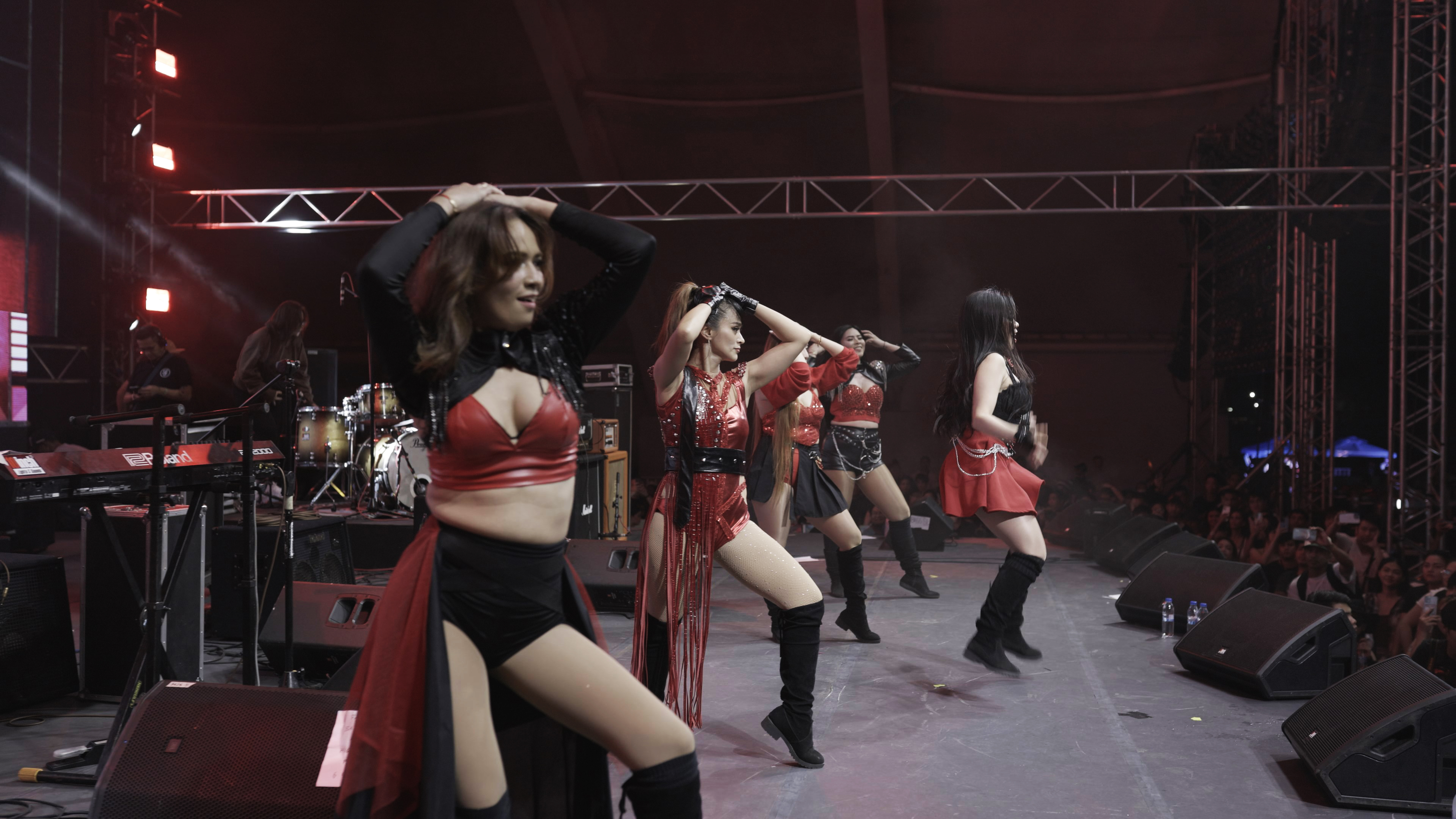
- Original SexBomb Girls performing at Howlers Manila Music Festival 2.0 in 2023

Background information
- Also known as: SB Girls; SB NewGen; SexBomb Dancers
- Origin: Quezon City, Philippines
- Genres: OPM; P-pop; pop; dance
- Works: Discography; filmography
- Years active: 1999–present
- Labels: DSI J Entertainment; Viva; Focus; Sony; Musiko
- Award: Box Office Entertainment Awards

The SexBomb Girls (also known as SB Girls, SBG, and SexBomb Dancers) is a Filipino girl group formed by dance guru Joy Cancio in 1999. Known for their novelty music and stage performances, they are credited as one of the leading figures of the Pinoy pop (P-pop) wave in the Philippines. They rose to fame as dancers of the noontime variety show Eat Bulaga! and eventually branched into singing and acting. The group achieved major commercial success in the early 2000s, releasing four studio albums, several of which earned multi-platinum certifications, becoming the best-selling girl group in Asia and in the Philippines in the 2000s, prior to the rise of K-pop. In 2007, they were elevated into the Hall of Fame of the Box Office Entertainment Awards after winning five consecutive times as the "Most Popular Dance Group". Beyond their commercial success, the SexBomb Girls became a defining presence in early-2000s Filipino popular culture, with their music, choreography, and catchphrases continuing to be referenced and revived in later media.

== History ==
=== 1999-2001: Formation ===
In November 1999, a group of four female dancers from a group Danz Focus Dancers was formed by dance coach Joy Cancio under the name Chicken Sandwich Dancers as background of a Filipino noon time show, Eat Bulaga!. These four members included Rochelle Pangilinan (as "Akang"), Debra Ignacio (as "Pepay"), Cheryl Genove (as "Menggay") and Janine Ramos (as "Kikay"), dancers for "Meron o Wala" segment eventually morphed into the hit "Laban o Bawi" in later years. Between 2000 and 2001, Ignacio, Genove and Ramos slowly departed from the group prompting Cancio to search for new dancers for the said show, thus the search for SexBomb Dancers was introduced, early members who were introduced include, Aira Bermudez, Jopay Paguia, Izzy Trazona, and Mia Pangyarihan. Cancio was a former member of the Vicor Dancers of the 1980s. The name "SexBomb" came from the 1999 hit song of Tom Jones, a hit during the period. Pangilinan was the only member who remained out of the original members, thus landing her the role and title as the group leader.

=== 2001-2002: Eat Bulaga!, The SexBomb Singers and Unang Putok ===
The searched for SexBomb Dancers continued until 2001, the finalists, Mae Acosta, Grace Nera, sisters, Sandy and Cheche Tolentino and Weng Ibarra were then added to group. The group continued their skit as background dancers in Eat Bulaga! in the segment "Laban o Bawi". They provided energetic dance numbers and lively chants during the game, encouraging contestants and the audience. Their fame exploded through this segment on Eat Bulaga!, transitioning from backup dancers to stars.

The first attempt of creating a singing compartment for SexBomb occurred in late 2001 with Rochelle Pangilinan (the group leader), Jopay Paguia, Evette Pabalan (discovered in 2001 Eat Bulaga! singing contest, impersonating Alanis Morissette), Weng Ibarra, Sugar Mercado and Aibee Chiongson. However, due to Chiongson and Mercado's departure from the group, this first attempt dissolved quickly. In 2002, their management again attempted to form two groups separating the singers and dancers, hence, The SexBomb Singers and The SexBomb Dancers were formed. The SexBomb Dancers was headed by Aira Bermudez while The SexBomb Singers was headed by main leader Rochelle Pangilinan, with Evette Pabalan as the lead vocalist. The final singers consist of Rochelle Pangilinan, Evette Pabalan, Jopay Paguia, Weng Ibarra, Monic Icban and Izzy Trazona. However, collectively the group is still called as The SexBomb Girls including all release and promotional materials and projects of The SexBomb Singers.

Mid 2002, The SexBomb Girls released their debut studio album, Unang Putok, led by its first single, "Bakit Papa?". The song quickly gained popularity, in part due to its incorporation of the "Laban o Bawi" and "Get! Get! Aww!" chant from the variety show Eat Bulaga!, which contributed to its widespread recognition among Filipino audiences. Their first studio album, Unang Putok was a massive hit and included the hit songs "Crush Kita", "Pretty Little Baby", "Di Ko Na Mapipigilan" ("I Can No Longer Stop") and "Tulog Na Baby" ("Sleep Now Baby"). The album received quadruple platinum certification (4x Platinum) from the Philippine Association of the Record Industry (PARI). Due to the massive success of Bakit Papa, the SexBomb Girls debuted in their own movie of the same title which was released in the Philippines in the same year. The Sexbomb Singers took the lead, with the SexBomb Dancers playing support. This was produced by Regal Entertainment, directed by Uro Q. Dela Cruz with casts include Allan K., Wendell Ramos, Epi Quizon, Chynna Ortaleza and Richard Gutierrez. Later that year, they released their first Christmas album Wish Ko Sa Pasko under BMG Records and was certified Gold in the Philippines and was nominated for Best Christmas Recording at the Awit Awards. By the end of the year, the group welcomed the addition of both Johlan Veluz and Sunshine Garcia.

=== 2003-2004: Daisy Siete, Round 2 and Bomb Thr3at ===
External videos
- SexBomb Girls performing The Spageti Song, published in 2003

In 2003, The SexBomb Girls released their sophomore album entitled Round 2 which marked a significant expansion of the group's mainstream popularity and commercial success. It was headlined by the novelty dance track "The Spageti Song" featuring Joey de Leon. This album catapulted SexBomb Girls into household name with The Spageti Song becoming a dance craze taking over Filipino audience of all ages and was frequently performed on television variety shows, community events, school programs, and public gatherings, contributing to its status as one of the most recognizable novelty songs in Philippine pop culture. Other songs released from this album were "Kiss Sabay Hug", "Loveless" and "Sige, Sige" featuring Janno Gibbs. This album received a more impressive quintuple platinum certification from the Philippine Association of the Record Industry (PARI). New members, Jacque Esteves, Aifha Medina, Cynthia Yapachingco, and Jhoana Orbeta were all added afterwards.

Due to their unexpected popularity, The SexBomb Girls debut on their own Philippine television drama Daisy Siete produced by Focus Entertainment which aired on GMA Network starting 2003 and ending in July 2010, extending to 26 seasons (a total of almost 7 years). From 2002 to 2003, the girls also became a cast of Daboy en Da Girl, with Rochelle as Britney, and the girls as Japayukis. The group also appeared on different guestings on the GMA Network including their own life stories in Magpakailanman. Aside from dancing, recording and acting, the group has performed in night shows and concerts at The Library in Malate, Manila, Joketime in Pasay City and Cavite, Oblivion Bar and Longue, Dutdutan Tattoo Conventions by Tribal Philippines, Yamaha Philippines, and at Zirkoh and Klownz in Quezon City every week, and also traveled across the country to host festivals, special occasions, and requested town event guest shows.

In late 2003, new set of auditions were done in the search of new and young members of SexBomb with Mariam Al-Obaidi added as one of the SexBomb Singers. May 2004, The SexBomb Girls released their third studio album titled as Bomb Thr3at with the lead single "Halukay Ube". The album also featured other hits such as "Tong Song", "Echusa" and "Amoy ng Papa". This album is also considered a massive hit receiving a double platinum certification from the Philippine Association of the Record Industry (PARI). However, Al-Obaidi left the group unannounced and was seen in the rival show Wowowee in ABS-CBN as the newest ASF Dancer. The group later saw new members, Danielle Ramirez and Jovel Palomo being added in the group to form a new singing unit known as "DJ Bomb", with younger members, Louise Bolton, Mycha Bautista and Cherry Ann Rufo all joining the dancers. Former member, Sugar Mercado also returned to the group this year.

In addition to their original recordings, the SexBomb Dancers also released a series of dance compilation albums in the early 2000s — Sexbomb’s Sexiest Hits (2002), Sexbomb’s Sexiest Hits: 2 (2003), and Sexbomb’s Sexiest Hits: 3 (2004) — which featured a selection of European Eurodance and pop tracks. The songs included in these compilations, performed mostly by international artists, were accompanied by choreography that the SexBomb Dancers popularized through mall shows and live performances held nationwide. The Sexiest Hits 3 received Platinum certification from the Philippine Association of the Record Industry (PARI). These albums helped bring global dance tunes into the Philippine mainstream, with the group's routines encouraging audiences to learn and perform the dances at school programs, parties, community events, and social gatherings. Some of the tracks associated with this era included dance hits such as Lou Bega’s "Angelina", DJ Bobo’s "Chihuahua" and "Step Into the Rhythm" and T-Rio's "(Choopeta) Mamãe eu quero".

=== 2005-2010: Sumayaw Sumunod album, dispute with Eat Bulaga & other ventures ===
Early 2005, SexBomb singer Monic left the group and was replaced by SexBomb Dancer, Che-Che. The group also launched a new show in QTV, "Let's Get Aww" with Aira, Cheche, and Johlan as the lead members of the said show. However, the show was short-lived.

The fourth studio album of SexBomb Girls was then recorded and titled as Sumayaw, Sumunod: The Best of Sexbomb Girls which included new songs as well as their all-time hits and was released in 2005. This compilation album was certified platinum by the Philippine Association of the Record Industry (PARI). The group's fame continued to permeate with the said album releases, constant national television show guests, live shows in political campaigns and comedy bars and the ongoing episodes of Daisy Siete. The SexBomb Girls has been credited as the best-selling girl group in Asia in the 2000s during this time. During this time, they were declared as the best-selling girl group in the Philippines of the 2000s by selling over 12 million records (4 studio albums, 4 compilation albums and Christmas singles).

In March 2006, The SexBomb Girls left Eat Bulaga! due to a management conflict, stemming from a misunderstanding and perceived unfair treatment after one member, Sugar Mercado, gained significant popularity, leading to a rift with the show's management (TAPE Inc./Malou Choa-Fagar) and the group's manager, Joy Cancio. As a sign of protest against how the girls were being treated (being made backups to Sugar), Joy Cancio pulled the entire group from the show, leading to their temporary departure and the creation of the EB Babes. The group would later return as regulars to Eat Bulaga! in March 2007.

In April 2007, The SexBomb Girls was inducted into the Box Office Entertainment Awards' Hall of Fame, after they won the "Most Popular Dance Group" award for five consecutive years. In the same year, Eat Bulaga! host Joey de Leon released a compilation album with the newest dance craze "Itaktak Mo" featuring The SexBomb Girls. The SexBomb Girls also became part of a television game show Tok! Tok! Tok! Isang Milyon Pasok alongside Paolo Bediones. During this period, leader Rochelle Pangilinan debut her first solo album "Roc-A-Holic", with the lead single "Baile" featuring Filipino rapper Gloc-9. The group also continued to appear on GMA-7 morning talk show, Sis, which held a segment similar to the Search for Sexbomb contest would be held on the show that would see the addition of four finalists that included Kristel Moreno and the ultimate grand-winner of the competition, Michelle Mercado. The album also features songs with Michael V. and fellow SexBomb members Evette and Jovel. Jopay also appeared in television series Etheria: Ang Ikalimang Kaharian ng Encantadia and Encantadia: Pag-ibig Hanggang Wakas and in the film Fantastic Man. Aira Bermudez also did solo projects through supporting roles for Enteng Kabisote: Okay Ka, Fairy Ko... The Legend and Iskul Bukol 20 Years After as well as in the reality show Survivor Philippines: Celebrity Showdown.

In 2008, Che-Che participated and won the Emerald Ball Dancesport Competition in Los Angeles, California in the Amateur Novice International Latin Division. Former SexBomb singer, Monic Icban returned to the group, with the release of "Vaklushii".

In 2010, Daisy Siete aired its last episode through "Adam or Eve". In honor of the noontime drama series, a singing sub-group named Daisies was formed with their debut single Take One for the soundtrack album of the last season of Daisy Siete, Adam or Eve. The Daisies composed of the five youngest members of SexBomb: Louise Bolton, Mhyca Bautista, Che-che Tolentino, Jomarie Gutierrez and Jaja Barro. The SexBomb Girls’ supposed 11-year streak as "Asia’s best-selling girl group" was broken in 2010, with the breakthrough of K-Pop acts like Girls' Generation and 2NE1 after the release of "Gee" and "Fire" respectively. In the same year, many members had officially left the group including prominent members like Evette, Izzy, Jopay, Jacky, Danielle, Jovel and Aifha leaving SexBomb Girls with only 17 members.

=== 2011-2022: Dismissal from Eat Bulaga and hiatus ===
Upon the group's dismissal from their house show Eat Bulaga! in 2011, the SexBomb Girls became freelance and appeared on GMA, ABS-CBN and TV5. With the final departure of the frontliners of the dance group such as Rochelle and Jopay in 2011, the grand champion of Danz Showdown: The Search for the Next SexBomb Girls Dona Veliganio was added to the Daisies. In 2012, the Daisies were no longer onset and an official set of vocalists named the New Generation SexBomb Singers composed of Louise, Jomarie, Jaja and Dona.

In December 2013, the original members of the dance group went their separate ways. This led to the formation of "SexBomb NewGen" or "SB NewGen" (Sexbomb New Generation).

=== 2023-present: Reunion projects and Get! Get! Aw!: The SexBomb Reunion concert ===
In 2023, the original SexBomb members Rochelle Pangilinan, Jopay Paguia, Che-Che Tolentino, Sunshine Garcia, Mia Pangyarihan, and Johlan Veluz reunited when online streaming giant Netflix announced their new subscription rate in a new advertisement. They reprised The Spaghetti Song with new lyrics. In the same year, Jopay, Che-Che, Jacky, Mhyca, and Sandy reunited for a performance as part of the official line-up of HOWLERS Manila Festival held in Circuit Makati Concert Grounds., performing The Spaghetti Song and Bakit Papa?.

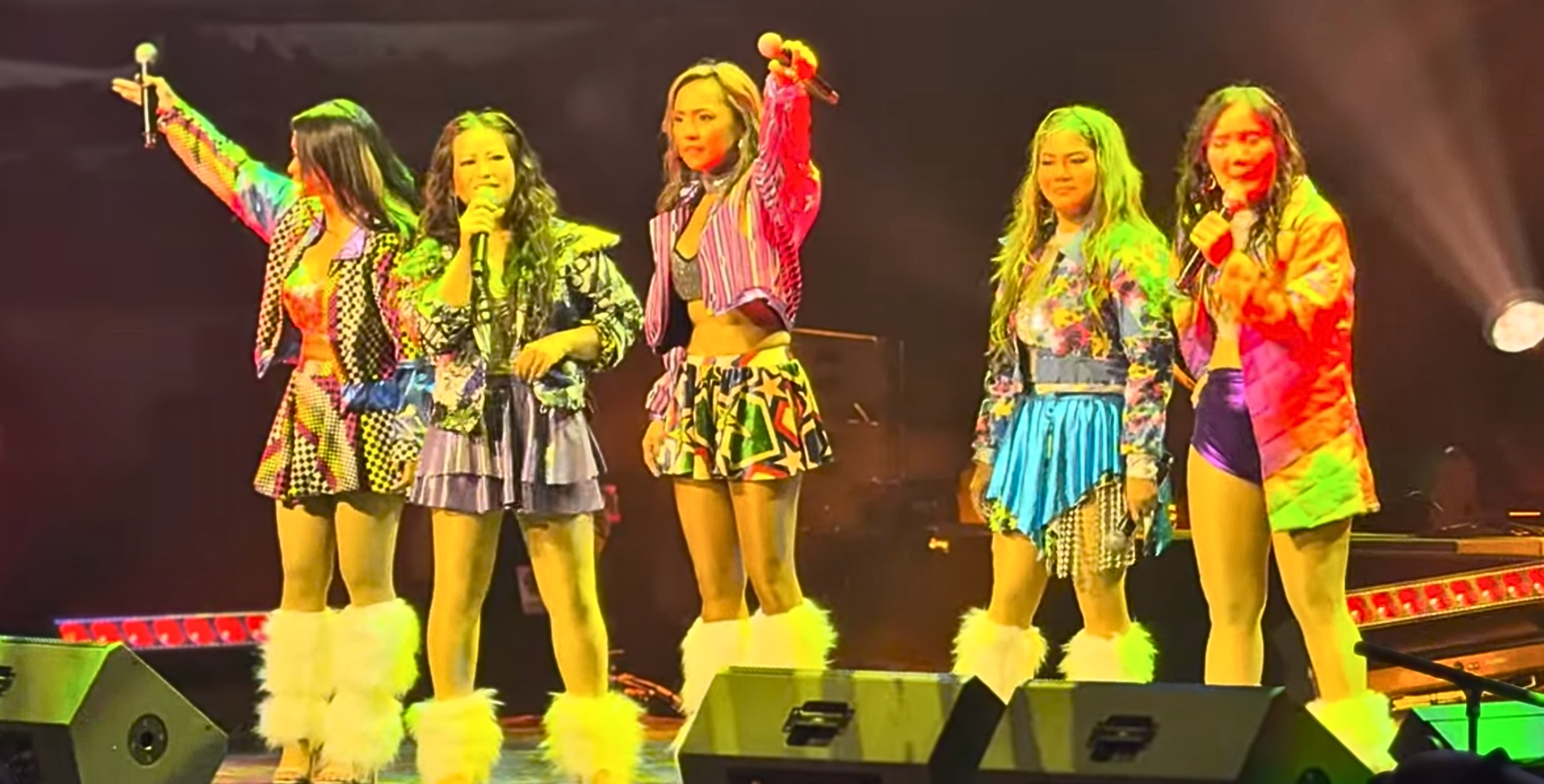
SexBomb Singers performing Echusa in 2025 at the Get! Get! Aw! concert

In 2025, Sexbomb announced their reunion concert titled as Get, Get, Aw! — The SexBomb Concert, their first reunion performance in decade. According to statements made by Pangilinan in post-concert interviews, the production initially faced financial and logistical challenges. Pangilinan said that she had approached multiple concert producers to stage the reunion, but none agreed to take on the project. As a result, five members of the group (Rochelle, Jopay, Mia, Sunshine and Aifha) reportedly contributed their own funds to independently finance the concert, with the help of NY Entourage Productions, in order for it to proceed as planned. The concert's first night took place at the Smart Araneta Coliseum on 4 December 2025, and due to strong demand, a second date (branded as rAWnd 2) was added for 9 December 2025 at the SM Mall of Asia Arena. During this performance, a third and final show, dubbed rAWnd 3, The Finale, was announced and scheduled on February 6, 2026, also at the SM Mall of Asia Arena on a 360-degree stage set-up. Due to overwhelming demand, 2 more shows were scheduled on February 7 and 8, 2026. The concert series has been noted for its commercial success, strong fan engagement, and nostalgic appeal, underscoring the group's continued cultural influence in the Philippine music and entertainment scene. SexBomb Girls was also awarded the "Distinguished Dance Troupe Award" at the 2025 Golden Pillar Awards held during the Aura Magic Ball Charity Gala at the Grand Ballroom of Okada Manila.

In January 2026, SexBomb Girls' members appear on multiple TV guestings and performances in GMA Network's All-Out Sundays and ABS-CBN's It's Showtime. Jopay and Shane also performed on TV5's Vibe to promote the 2026 leg of the reunion concert. SexBomb Girls also performed in multiple music festivals across the country, with Mhyca, Aira, Mia and Jopay in the Abel Music Festival in Abra; Jopay, Mia and Sunshine in the Tarlac Music Festival in Tarlac City; Jopay, Sandy, Cynthia and Mhaica at the Tupig Music Festival in Mangatarem, Pangasinan and Rochelle at the Dinagyang Festival in Iloilo City.

On February 6, 2026, they announced the "Get! Get! arAWnd The World Tour" during the 3rd show of their reunion concert, with initial confirmed shows in Dubai and Abu Dhabi, United Arab Emirates in March 2026, but rescheduled later on to a single show in Abu Dhabi on August 8, 2026. The world tour kicked off in Australia in April 2026 and continued to the United States of America

The regional tour of the reunion series also kicked-off in Tacloban City in March 2026. On February 8, 2026, they announced a 6th show in Manila dubbed as "rAWnd 6".

In March 2026, it was announced that the Get! Get! Aww concert broke records as the first Filipino act to sell out four shows at the SM Mall of Asia Arena surpassing record held by Gary Valenciano in 2024, and the first Filipino act to stage three consecutive sold-out show at the same venue with a 360-degree stage setup.

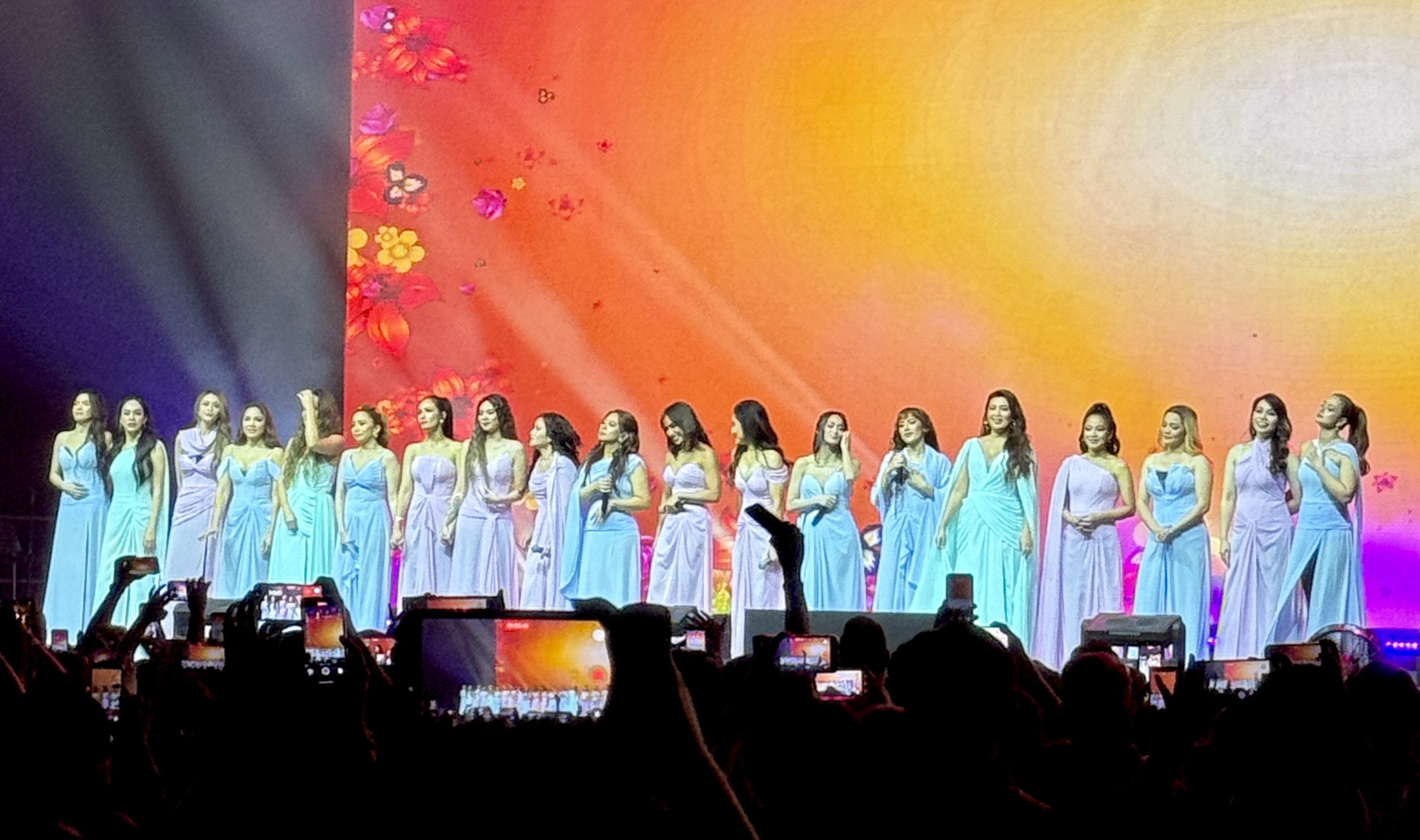
SexBomb Girls performing at the Etihad Arena in Abu Dhabi in 2026

In April 2026, the SexBomb Girls collaborated with Moonton for the Mobile Legends: Bang Bang Summer Break campaign, featuring members Aira Bermudez, Rochelle Pangilinan, and Mhyca Bautista. The collaboration included a re-imagined "Halukay Ube" music video and the release of an in-game "Get, Get, Aw!" Battle Emote.

On May 3, 2026, SexBomb Girls was one of the headlines for the 2026 Aurora Music Festival in Clark, Pampanga alongside SB19. On August 8, 2026, SexBomb Girls performed at the Etihad Arena in Abu Dhabi, and awarded with a plaque of recognition as the first ever Filipino artist to perform at the venue. During the show, they announced a Dubai show for December 19, 2026 and a rAWnd 2 of "Get! Get! Aww!" USA for September 2026.

On August 7, 2026, SexBomb Girls releases a brand new single called "MAMA MAMA" through PPL Professional People's Lab under exclusive license to ONErpm.The group was also honored with the "P-pop Icon of the Year" Award at the 11th P-Pop Music Awards.

== Artistry ==
=== Musical style ===
The SexBomb Girls developed an artistic identity centered on high-energy choreography, novelty-driven pop music, and performance concepts designed for audience participation, distinguishing them from other Filipino girl groups of their era. Cultural commentators have noted that the group's appeal lay not only in their songs, but in how these were presented visually and physically through synchronized routines and recurring chants. In a retrospective analysis of their influence, Spot Philippines described the group's style as one that emphasized "movement, repetition, and audience engagement," elements that contributed to the memorability of their performances on television and live stages.

"The Spageti Song" (2003)
Audio sample of "The Spageti Song," highlighting the chant-based novelty style associated with the SexBomb Girls’ cultural impact

Musically, the group's repertoire was rooted in dance-pop and novelty music, featuring simple, chant-like lyrics and repetitive melodic structures intended to complement choreography. Songs such as "Bakit Papa?", "The Spageti Song", and "Halukay Ube" were designed to be easily learned and performed by audiences, reinforcing what Rolling Stone Philippines described as the group's role in popularizing "performance-first pop music" in the country. The publication further observed that these tracks functioned as "cultural cues as much as songs," inseparable from their associated dance routines.

Beyond individual singles, the SexBomb Girls incorporated "thematic and conceptual elements" into their albums and stage presentations. Releases such as Round 2 and Bomb Thr3at adopted visual motifs—including boxing and superhero imagery—that reflected an effort to diversify their presentation while maintaining a cohesive group identity. Writing for Vantage Magazine, University of the Philippines publication, The GUIDON described the group's evolution as an "explosive influence" that showed how novelty and spectacle could coexist with sustained popularity in Filipino pop culture.

=== Influence ===
The success of the SexBomb Girls in the early 2000s helped shape the entertainment landscape for performance-oriented all-female groups in the Philippines. Their widespread popularity on noontime television and in music and dance performance created a model that other groups emulated or were compared with in mainstream media.

One of the most visible contemporaries during their peak were the EB Babes, a female dance group formed to perform regularly on Eat Bulaga! following the temporary departure of the SexBomb Girls from the show. Members of the EB Babes acknowledged the influence of the SexBomb Girls' tenure on the program, with one member stating that, "...compared to SexBomb, talaga pong hindi namin kayang tapatan ang nagawa nila for about five years or more" ("...compared to the SexBomb Girls, we really cannot match what they were able to accomplish over a span of five years or more"), highlighting how the earlier group set a high benchmark for television dance groups. The two groups were later featured together in performances at reunion events, demonstrating their linked history in Philippine variety entertainment.

Beyond television dance troupes, the mid-2000s saw the presence of other all-female entertainment ensembles that drew on the broader environment of performance and dance popularity that the SexBomb Girls helped cultivate. Their influence on later girl groups includes the formula of catchy, novelty-driven dance tracks, synchronized choreography, and a strong, accessible, and charismatic image, directly paving the way for acts like the Viva Hot Babes, Mocha Girls and Pop Girls. Groups such as the Baywalk Bodies were part of a wider wave of dance-centric acts that performed in clubs, live shows, and music releases during that period. Although members of the Baywalk Bodies stated they did not see themselves as "copying" the SexBomb Girls, their existence as a similarly formatted group reflected the broader popularity of all-female dance and music collectives in the Filipino entertainment industry.

== Cultural impact ==
"...The Sexbomb Girls are very identifiable, easy to remember...they are still recognized as such is a big indicator of how popular they are..."

— University of the Philippines sociologist Samuel Cabbuag on SexBomb Girls impact in Filipino pop culture

The SexBomb Girls had a significant impact on Filipino popular culture in the early 2000s, transcending their origins as backup dancers to become mainstream entertainment figures. Their presence on television, particularly through daily appearances on the noontime variety show Eat Bulaga!, helped popularize synchronized dance routines and catchphrases that became cultural touchstones among Filipino audiences such as "Laban o Bawi", "Get! Get! Aw!" and "Papa".

The phrase "Pinalaki ng SexBomb" ("raised by SexBomb") has been used by members of the group and their fans to describe the generation of Filipino audiences who grew up watching and participating in the music, dance routines, and television appearances of the SexBomb Girls in the early to mid-2000s. Members of the group referenced this sentiment on social media in promoting their 2025 reunion concerts, with Pangilinan writing "Para sa mga pinalaki ng SexBomb!" in a teaser post for their December 2025 performance, invoking nostalgia and acknowledging fans who grew up with their hits and choreography. In conjunction with the reunion tour, the group released a new song entitled "Pinalaki ng SexBomb" in late 2025, which capitalizes on the phrase and its association with the fans who helped popularize the group's music and dance culture. The song was first performed live during the Get, Get, Aw!: The SexBomb Concert series, and has been featured in promotional content distributed through the group's official social media channels.

Their transition into recording artists resulted in a series of novelty dance-pop hits, such as "Bakit Papa?", "The Spageti Song", and "Di Ko Na Mapipigilan", which became widely recognized across the Philippines and remain part of the country's musical memory. These songs were very popular and became embedded in community events, school programs, and social gatherings, often accompanied by signature choreography that encouraged mass participation.

Critics and commentators have noted that the group played a formative role in establishing a performance-driven model for Filipino pop acts, characterized by coordinated choreography, strong group branding, and cross-platform visibility. Their success demonstrated the commercial viability of all-female dance-centric groups in the Philippine entertainment industry and helped shape the foundations of what would later be described as Pinoy pop.

One of the most notable moments in the group's television history was a highly publicized performance showdown with the EB Babes on the noontime variety show Eat Bulaga!. At the time, the event drew significant attention from fans and media, sparking discussions about dance group rivalries and performance styles. The showdown remains widely remembered by audiences, highlighting the SexBomb Girls' influence on the competitive entertainment landscape of Philippine television.

In the digital era, their legacy has persisted through nostalgic revivals on social media platforms such as TikTok, where challenges and trend videos based on their music and choreography have engaged both original fans and younger generations, illustrating the group's ongoing influence on Filipino entertainment culture.

=== Impact on LGBTQ+ community ===
The SexBomb Girls have held enduring popularity among segments of the Filipino LGBTQ+ community, particularly during their peak in the early 2000s and in later nostalgia-driven revivals. Their energetic performances, bold choreography, and unapologetic stage presence resonated with audiences who appreciated assertive, expressive dance culture. Commentators have noted that the group's distinctive moves and catchphrases, such as "Get! Get! Aw!" and the "Spageti Song" routines, have been widely referenced and recreated in social media trends, including by diverse fan communities that include LGBTQ+ users on platforms such as TikTok, where challenges celebrating their songs have attracted millions of views.

Analyses of Filipino pop culture have highlighted that audiences often embrace female pop and dance acts as icons within queer communities, where expressive performance, bold aesthetics, and dance-driven music frequently intersect with LGBTQ+ celebration and identity construction. In this context, the SexBomb Girls are sometimes mentioned alongside other female pop performers as figures whose work provided a space for all gender identities to engage with traditionally effeminate dance performance and community enjoyment, contributing to a broader culture of inclusivity and expression in Philippine popular music.

== Public image ==
Although the SexBomb Girls enjoyed widespread popularity and became a defining presence in early 2000s Filipino pop culture, they were not without criticism and controversy regarding their public image. In the predominantly Catholicism in Philippines, some commentators and religious figures took issue with the group's performances and attire. Their involvement in a 2010 voter education campaign, in which they performed a rendition of the song "Bilog na Hugis Itlog," was described as "ominous" by the late Archbishop Oscar Cruz, though the Commission on Elections defended the campaign as "nothing immoral."

Members of the group themselves have acknowledged that they were sometimes perceived as a "bad influence" or faced discrimination early in their careers due to their image and performances. Rochelle Pangilinan responded to such criticisms by noting that standards of acceptable performance have evolved, and that the group's dancing and presence were rooted in talent and context rather than mere provocation.

Academic analysis of Ateneo de Manila University has examined the SexBomb Girls as a social phenomenon that shaped representations of women in Philippine media. In a semiotic study, Trina Leah Mendoza argued that the group's frequent broadcasts on Eat Bulaga! contributed to normalizing the presence of "sexy female background dancers" in noontime television, influencing audience perceptions of gender and performance in the cultural landscape of the Philippines.

== Philanthropy ==
The SexBomb Girls have engaged in a range of philanthropic and community-focused activities over the years, both during their initial run in the 2000s and in later reunions and public events.

One of the group's documented charity efforts occurred during the COVID-19 pandemic when several former members reunited in a group video call performance to raise funds for much-needed medical supplies for healthcare workers on the front lines of the crisis. The online event, which featured members such as Rochelle Pangilinan, Weng Ibarra, Evette Pabalan, Jopay Paguia, and Monic Icban, aimed to support pandemic relief efforts through entertainment and fan engagement.

In addition to digital fundraisers, the SexBomb Girls have taken part in live events that combine entertainment with opportunities for community support. During a four-day mall activation in December 2025 headlined by the group's reunion performance, the BingoPlus Foundation hosted a "Wall of Giving" and donation booth at the event. Attendees were encouraged to contribute in-kind donations and participate in point-to-donation conversions benefiting typhoon victims, blending entertainment with social giving.

Beyond formal charity structures, the group has been involved in dance workshops and community bonding activities. In 2009, they conducted a summer dance workshop titled "Let’s Get Aww! A Fun-Filled Summer Workshop with the SexBomb Girls," where participants could learn dance moves and interact with the performers, fostering community participation and arts engagement.

The group has also participated in public service initiatives. Notably, in the run-up to the 2010 Philippine general election, the SexBomb Girls performed in the "Bilog na Hugis Itlog"("egg-shaped circle") voter education campaign, a music video and outreach effort produced by GMA Network with the Commission on Elections and the Parish Pastoral Council for Responsible Voting to teach voters how to properly mark automated ballots. The campaign was widely aired and included live participatory events such as flash mobs with students to engage communities in fun and memorable voter instruction, and received official support from Comelec spokespeople. In an undergraduate thesis examining the campaign, the author analyzed the SexBomb Dancers’ performance and public reception of the advertisement through classic communication theories.

== Legacy ==
The SexBomb Girls’ influence on Filipino popular culture has extended beyond their initial run in the early 2000s. Regarded as a phenomenon, their songs remained relevant long after the members went their separate ways .

Several of the SexBomb Girls’ hits achieved widespread recognition in the Philippines and have maintained cultural visibility well beyond their original release. Their early novelty-dance singles helped establish the group as pop icons in the 2000s, blending catchy hooks and signature choreography that became embedded in Filipino social life and media. "Bakit Papa?," released in 2002 as the lead single from their debut album Unang Putok, became one of the group's defining early hits and helped establish them as recording artists beyond their variety show persona. Its popularity was such that it later inspired contemporary artists; in 2023, P-pop girl group YARA released an updated version of "Bakit Papa?" with a modern R&B inflection, demonstrating the track's enduring appeal and influence on newer Filipino pop acts decades after its initial release.

"The Spageti Song," released in 2003 and featured on later compilations, exemplified the group's knack for catchy, participatory performances. The track's repetitive hook—"Ispagheting pababa, pababa / Ispageting pataas, pataas"—and its corresponding dance routine were widely adopted at community events, school programs, and social gatherings, making it a national sensation and a touchstone of early-2000s Filipino pop culture. Retrospective commentary highlights the song as one of the most recognizable novelty dance tracks of the era. According to The Philippine Star, "Bakit Papa?" and "The Spageti Song" are the most iconic and still covered and played today.

One of the most notable legacies of the group is the song "Jopay" by Filipino alternative rock band Mayonnaise. Originally released in 2004 and named after SexBomb member Jopay, the track became a hit within the local music scene and has endured as a classic OPM anthem. According to band vocalist Monty Macalino, the song was written specifically for Jopay after he saw her on television, saying that the emotional connection he felt inspired him to compose the track. The band later performed "Jopay" live with Paguia-Zamora onstage at the SexBomb Girls’ reunion concert in 2025, where she danced and embraced the band, underscoring the song's personal and cultural significance. In recent years, "Jopay" experienced a resurgence through social media platforms such as TikTok, where its renewed popularity introduced the song and its connection to the group to younger generations.

The SexBomb Girls’ continued relevance was also evident in their nostalgic reunion concerts held in late 2025 at major venues such as the Smart Araneta Coliseum and the SM Mall of Asia Arena, where performances drew large crowds and widespread media coverage. Reviews and reports highlighted the enthusiastic fan response and the emotional resonance of revisiting classic songs like "Di Ko Na Mapipigilan" reinforcing the idea that the group's work has remained embedded in the collective memory of Filipino audiences.

As evidence of their widespread recognition in Philippine entertainment, the SexBomb Girls inspired parody acts in mainstream comedy. The long-running sketch show Bubble Gang from GMA Network created the all-male comedic dance group "Sexballs", whose routines and song parodies such as "Bakit Mama?" riffed on the SexBomb Girls’ iconic performances and music, demonstrating how the original group's style had become a recognizable reference point in local humor and satire. Members of the Sexballs—performers including Michael V., Ogie Alcasid, Wendell Ramos, and Antonio Aquitania—later appeared alongside the SexBomb Girls in reunion concert in 2025, reinforcing the interplay between tribute and original performance.

== Members ==
Original SexBomb Girls

- Rochelle Pangilinan (1999–2007, 2008–11)
- Debra "Debbie" Ignacio (1999–2001)
- Cheryl "Che-Che" Genove (1999–2000)
- Janine Ramos (1999–2000)
- Jopay Paguia (2000–10, 2012–14)
- Aira Bermudez (2000–06, 2007–17)
- Jayne Lao (2000–02)
- Cherrie Nhorren Ingal (2000)
- Nathalie "Babat" Imperial (2000–02)
- Michelle Reyes (2000–02)
- JB Cifra (2000–01)
- Mia Pangyarihan (2000–13)
- Izzy Trazona (2000–2001, 2002–2011)
- Yvette Lopez (2001)
- Mae Acosta (2001–05, 2007–13)
- Grace Nera (2001–13)
- Sandy Tolentino (2001–05, 2007–14)
- Che-Che Tolentino (2001–14)
- Weng Ibarra (2001–07, 2008–10)
- Evette Pabalan (2001–2010)
- Sugar Mercado (2001–02, 2004–06)
- Aibee Chiongson (2001–02)
- Jacky Rivas (2002–10, 2012, 2014–16)
- Monic Icban (2002–05, 2008–10)
- Johlan Veluz (2002–13)
- Sunshine Garcia (2002–2013)
- Cynthia "CY" Yapchingco (2002–2010)
- Jacquelline "Jacque" Esteves (2003–2006)
- Aifha Medina (2003–10)
- Jhoana Orbeta (2003–05, 2007–12)
- Mariam Al-Obaidi (2004)
- Rodellyn "Joice" Pecho (2004–05)
- Jovel Palomo (2004–09)
- Danielle Ramirez (2004–10)
- Louise Bolton (2004–16)
- Mhyca Bautista (2004–14)
- Cherry Ann Rufo (2004–07)
- Molly Baylon (2006)
- Hazel Taligatos (2006–07)
- Kate Sacay (2006–07)
- Danica Gulapa (2006–12)
- Kristel Moreno (2007)
- Charm Saldon (2007)
- Alice Almocera (2007)
- Michelle Mercado (2007–09)
- Shane Gonzales (2007–10)
- Sheena Flores (2008–11)
- Jomarie Gutierrez (2009–14)
- Stephanie Lantion (2009)
- Jaja Barro (2010–14)
- Dona Veliganio (2010–16)
- Julie Ann Septimo (2010–13)
- Yui Gutierrez (2010–11)
- June Nima Eltanal (2010-12)
- Trizia Ramis (2012–14)
- Krizia Ramis (2012–14)
- Joyce Camino (2012–16, 18–19)
- Camille Lazo (2012–2018)
- Kristine Saludo (2012–13)
- Kristine "Joyz" Decena (2012–13)
- Jane Albarracin (2012–13)

== Discography ==
=== Studio albums ===
- 2002: Unang Putok (Quadruple Platinum)
- 2003: Round 2 (Quintuple Platinum)
- 2004: Bomb Thr3at (Double Platinum)
- 2005: Sumayaw, Sumunod: The Best of the Sexbomb Girls (Platinum)
- 2007: Itaktak mo at iba pang Pasaway na Hits (With various artists)

=== Christmas albums and singles ===
- 2002: Wish Ko sa Pasko
- 2003: Spaghetti Sa Pasko (single)
- 2004: Busina Ng Pasko (Pik-piripik-pik and Silent Night Na Naman)
- 2026: MAMA MAMA

=== Dance compilation albums ===
The songs on these albums are performed mostly by European Eurodance artists. The choreography to the songs on these albums was popularized by the Sexbomb Dancers. Mall shows were held nationwide to promote these albums.

- 2002: Sexbomb's Sexiest Hits (Gold)
- 2002: Sexbomb: I Like & Other Hits (Gold)
- 2003: Sexbomb's Sexiest Hits: 2 (Gold)
- 2004: Sexbomb's Sexiest Hits: 3 (4× Platinum)
- 2006: Sexbomb Lips Don't Lie (From Shakira's Songs)

=== Compilation albums ===
- 2006: Daisy Siete: V-DAY Music from the TV Series
- 2007: Tabachingching: Daisy Siete Season 16 Soundtrack
- 2008: Vaklushii: Daisy Siete Season 19 Soundtrack
- 2008: Tinderella: Daisy Siete Season 20 Soundtrack
- 2010: Adam or Eve

=== Solo albums ===
- 2005: Jacque Estevez (Gold)
- 2007: ROC: Rocaholic (Gold)

== Filmography ==
=== Television ===
- 2002: Daboy en Da Girl (Aira, Jopay, Natalie, Rochelle, Jayne, Evette)
- 2003–2010: Daisy Siete
- 2004: Love to Love (Jacque, Jopay)
- 2005: Darna (Rochelle, Jacque)
- 2005: Etheria: Ang Ikalimang Kaharian ng Encantadia (Jopay)
- 2006: Encantadia: Pag-ibig Hanggang Wakas (Jopay)
- 2007–2008: Tok! Tok! Tok! Isang Milyon Pasok!
- 2009: Adik Sa'Yo (Rochelle)
- 2009: Show Me Da Manny (Rochelle)
- 2009: Darna (Rochelle, Cynthia, Mia, Sandy)
- 2010: Diva (Rochelle)
- 2010: Pilyang Kerubin (Sunshine)
- 2010: Smile TV (Cheche, Johlan)
- 2011: Amaya (Rochelle, Mia)
- 2012: Luv U (Trizia, Krizia, Camille)
- 2012: Broken Vow (Rochelle)
- 2013: Be Careful With My Heart (Jopay)
- 2013–present: Magpakailanman (Rochelle)
- 2013: My Husband's Lover (Mia)
- 2014: The Ryzza Mae Show (Rochelle, Jopay, Che-che)
- 2014: Marian (Rochelle, Johlan, Aira, Weng, Sandy, Mia, Louise, Che-Che, Evette)
- 2014: Carmela (Rochelle)
- 2014: Ang Lihim ni Annasandra (Rochelle)
- 2015: Luv U (Camille)
- 2015: Bridges of Love (Jopay, Janine, Angel)
- 2016: Kapuso Mo, Jessica Soho (Cheche)
- 2016: That's My Amboy (Mia)
- 2016: Tubig at Langis (Jopay)
- 2016: The Millionaire's Wife (Louise)
- 2016: The Story of Us (Kristel Moreno)
- 2016: Encantadia 2016 (Rochelle, Cheche, NewGen Jane, Camille)
- 2016: Banana Sundae Angelica Birthday (Jopay, Mia, Cheche, Louise)
- 2017: A Love to Last (NewGen Julie)
- 2017: Haplos (Mia, Cheche, Johlan, Cynthia, Aira, Louise)
- 2018: Lip Sync Battle Philippines (Joy Cancio, Rochelle, Aira, Cheche, NewGen)
- 2019: Inagaw na Bituin (Cheche, Sandy, Mia)
- 2019: Dragon Lady (Aira)
- 2019: World of Dance Philippines
- 2021: Wowowin (Aira)
- 2021-2022: The World Between Us (Mia)
- Various Year: Mars Pa More (Rochelle, Izzy, Mia, Sandy, Che-che, Aira, Mhyca, Johlan, Jopay)

=== Film ===
- 2001: Tusong Twesome (Debra)
- 2002: Bakit Papa (Sexbomb Girls)
- 2002: Bertud ng Putik (Rochelle)
- 2002: Lastikman (Jopay)
- 2004: Anak ka ng Tatay Mo (Cynthia) (Jomar)
- 2004: Fantastikman (Jopay, Grace, Rochelle, Jacky, Cynthia)
- 2004: Enteng Kabisote (Aira)
- 2005: Ispiritista (Aifha, Cynthia, Sugar, Danielle, Jovel)
- 2005: Enteng Kabisote 2 (Louise, Mhyca, Cherry Ann)
- 2008: Iskul Bukol 20 Years After (Ungasis and Escaleras Adventure) (Aira)
- 2011: Panday 2 (Jhoana, Jomarie)
- 2019: Indak (film) (SB NewGen)

=== Music videos ===
- 2013: Askal by Jose Manalo and Wally Bayola

=== Commercials ===
- 2002: Petron: Rev-X
- 2003: Avanti: Ballpen
- 2003: Speed Detergent
- 2004: Asahi Appliances
- 2005: Petron: Rev-X
- 2005: Simeco: Antacid
- 2023: Netflix
- 2024: Silver Swan: Wow Sarap Granules

=== Appearances ===
- 2023: Howlers Manila Music Festival 2.0 (Songs Performed Angelina, Bakit Papa and many more)

=== Concerts ===
- 2025- 2026: Get, Get, Aw! — The SexBomb Concert

== Awards and recognitions ==
=== Awards ===
Year (Note: Indicates the year of the ceremony. Each year is linked to the article about the awards held that year, wherever possible.)	Award	Category	Recipient(s)	Result	Ref.
2002	Box Office Entertainment Awards	Most Popular Dance Group	SexBomb Girls	Won	
2003	Box Office Entertainment Awards	Most Popular Dance Group	SexBomb Girls	Won	
2003	Awit Awards	Best Christmas Recording	Wish Ko Sa Pasko	Nominated	
2004	Box Office Entertainment Awards	Most Popular Dance Group	SexBomb Girls	Won	
2004	Box Office Entertainment Awards	Most Popular Group Singer	SexBomb Singers	Won	
2005	Box Office Entertainment Awards	Most Popular Dance Group	SexBomb Girls	Won	
2006	Box Office Entertainment Awards	Most Popular Dance Group	SexBomb Girls	Won	
2007	Box Office Entertainment Awards	Hall of Famer	SexBomb Girls	Won	
2007	Aliw Awards	Best Modern Dance Company	SexBomb Girls	Nominated	
2008	Aliw Awards	Best Modern Dance Company	SexBomb Girls	Nominated	
2008	38th Box Office Entertainment Awards	Most Popular Dance Group	SexBomb Girls	Nominated	
2025	Golden Pillar Award	Distinguished Dance Troupe Award	SexBomb Girls	Won	
2026	FAMAS Prestige Awards	Excellence Award for Dance and Entertainment Legacy	SexBomb Girls	Won	
2026	P-POP Music Awards	P-POP Icon of the Year	SexBomb Girls	Won	

YouTube:

- 2023: "Silver Play Button Award" - SB GIRLS PH (100,000 subscribers)
- 2018: "Silver Play Button Award" - SB NewGen (400,000 subscribers)

== SB NewGen ==
In 2013, when the original members of SexBomb Girls went their separate ways. Jara Cancio formed the SexBomb NewGen or SB NewGen (Sexbomb New Generation). The group is known to represent the new generation of the SexBomb Girls, producing all-female talents with expertise in dance genres such as hip-hop, contemporary and urban, as well as in singing, slowly deviating from the original group's main focus on novelty and jazz.

In 2014, SB NewGen were re-launched under a new company, J Entertainment, as the NewGen SexBomb Girls with three separate compartments: SexBomb NewGen (performed in national television), SexBomb Dancers (performed in outside shows), and SexBomb GKiss (the singers). SexBomb GKiss was initially composed of Louise Bolton, Dona Veliganio, and Joyce Canimo, but was later augmented in early 2015 with former original Mocha Girl: Hershey Delas Alas and with back-up SexBomb Dancers Jacky Rivas, Ynna Bayot, and Angel Gavilan. Upon the departure of Louise, Jacky, Dona, Joyce, Ynna, Angel, and Hershey in late 2015, the current line-up of the NewGen SexBomb Girls (now formally known as SexBomb NewGen) was established. Though no singing compartment is currently on the air, NewGen leader Jane Lumabi and hip-hopper Nerizza Germina stand as SB NewGen's singers in their shows in 2016.

With Germina leaving in 2017 for the Mocha Girls, Eunice Andrea was added to the SB NewGen roster in early 2017 to stand as the lead singer of the girl group in mall tours and daily shows. On August 4, 2017, SB NewGen is co-managed in unison by J Entertainment and Viva Artists Agency. In February 2019, SB NewGen released their first self-composed single in their music video entitled "Want U" featuring Michael "Cursebox" Negapatan under Viva Records and Cursebox Productions.

Members

- Lea Jane (2014–present)
- Julie May Aring (2016–present)
- Nikkie Millares (2016–present)
- Rei Young (2023–present)

=== Single ===
- 2019: Single Want U
- 2019: Single Newgen Shake
- 2020: Single Halo Halo
