= Lito Camo =

Filipino actor and singer-songwriter (born 1972)

- Born: December 25, 1972 (age 53); Bongabong, Oriental Mindoro, Philippines
- Genres: Novelty, pop, rock
- Occupations: Musician, singer, actor
- Instruments: Vocals, guitar
- Years active: 1997–present
- Formerly of: Calzada

Member of the Oriental Mindoro Provincial Board from the 2nd district
- In office June 30, 2019 – June 30, 2025

Carlito "Lito" Fadri Camo (born December 25, 1972) is a Filipino singer, songwriter, actor and politician. He is best known for composing numerous novelty songs for various artists such as "Bakit Papa? Tawag mo ako?", "The Spageti Song", "Bulaklak", "Wowowee", "Boom Tarat Tarat", and "Otso-Otso". Camo is a native of Bongabong, Oriental Mindoro. Camo also served as a Board Member of Oriental Mindoro's Second District from 2019-2025.

== Music career ==
In 1998, Camo released his debut studio album, entitled Sino Camo?, with the songs "Kung Ikaw" and "Hey Babe" being the lead singles. Four years later, in 2002, Camo released his second studio album, entitled Ano Camo?". Three years after the release of Ano Camo?, in 2005, he released his third studio album Ako Naman!. which is Camo's most recent studio album to date.

== Political career ==
Camo tried to run for Mayor Of Bongabong under the Liberal Party in 2016 but was defeated by Elgin Malaluan. He ran in 2019 as a Board Member for the Second District of Oriental Mindoro and won. He later won a second term in 2022.

Camo ran for Mayor Of Bongabong again but was defeated in the 2025 mayoral election in Bongabong, Oriental Mindoro.

== Discography ==
These are the songs composed, produced, and arranged by Camo (most are sung by other Filipino artists, and not necessarily sung by him, except as indicated).

- "Bestfriend"
- "Kung Ikaw" by Lito Camo (his first hit single)
- "Window Shopping" by himself
- "Miss Na Miss Na Kita" by himself
- "Pera o Bayong" by himself
- "Kakanta Ako, Sasayaw Kayo" by himself
- "Bakit Papa" by the Sexbomb Girls
- "Pretty Little Baby" by the SexBomb Girls
- "Halukay Ube" by the Sexbomb Girls featuring Joey de Leon
- "Eat Bulaga!" by the Sexbomb Girls
- "The Spageti Song" by Joey De Leon featuring the Sexbomb Girls
- "Sana Mama" by Masculados
- "Jumbo Hotdog" by Masculados
- "Ms. Flawless" by Angelica Jones
- "Ye Ye Vonnel" by April Boy Regino
- "Giling-Giling" by Willie Revillame
- "Bulaklak" by Viva Hot Babes
- "Anone?" by Yachang
- "Pandesal" by Viva Hot Men
- "Sunod Sa Galaw" by Jaboom Twins
- "Puppy Mo Ako" by Willie Revillame
- "Iyugyog Mo" by Willie Revillame
- "Otso-Otso" by Bayani Agbayani
- "In or Out" by Dara
- "Sasakyan Kita" by K and the Boxers
- "46" by Willie Revillame
- "Hep Hep Hooray (Happy Birthday)" by Willie Revillame
- "Papa Boogie" by Willie Revillame
- "Wowowee" by himself, later covered by Willie Revillame
- "Willing Willie" by Willie Revillame
- "Wil Time Bigtime" by Willie Revillame
- "Wowowillie" by Lito Camo
- "Wowowin" by Willie Revillame
- "Wil to Win" by Willie Revillame
- "Wilyonaryo" by Willie Revillame
- "Dododo Dadada" by Willie Revillame
- "Buksan Mo" by Willie Revillame
- "Tantaran" by Willie Revillame
- "Ganyan Ako" by Willie Revillame
- "Shake It Baby" by Willie Revillame
- "Sige Lang, Sige Lang" by Willie Revillame
- "Iiyak Na Lang" by Calzada
- "Araw-Araw ay Pasko" by Willie Revillame in Christmas Wish Album
- "Namamasko Po" by Willie Revillame (Christmas Wish album)
- "Boom Tarat Tarat" by Willie Revillame (Namamasko Po! album)
- "Boom Tarat Tarat (Tayo Na!)" by Willie Revillame (Dododo Dadada album)
- "Bow Wow Wow" by Willie Revillame
- "Baile" by Willie Revillame
- "Let's Party" by Willie Revillame
- "Sige Sige Sumayaw (Wowowillie & Wowowin)" by Willie Revillame
- "Sumayaw, Gumalaw, Tumaulon" by Willie Revillame
- "Bilog Ang Mundo" by Manny Pacquiao
- "Uuwi Ka Na Raw" by
- "Ibigay Mo Baby" by Willie Revillame
- "Pwede Ba" by Willie Revillame
- "Daisy Siete" by himself, later covered by the Sexbomb Girls
- "Happy Yipee Yehey" (theme song) by Randy Santiago, Rico J. Puno, John Estrada and others.
- "Sundo't Hatid" by
- "Nakaka..." by Masculados
- "Para Sa Iyo Ang Laban Na 'To" by Manny Pacquiao
- "Tawa" by Joey de Leon
- "Nanana" - won Best Novelty Recording in the 25th Awit Awards
- "Lalaban Ako Para sa Pilipino" by Manny Pacquiao
- "Talikodgenic Man Ako" by Herlene "Hipon" Budol
- "Laban" (2022 Manny Pacquiao presidential campaign jingle) by Ato Arman
- "MPBL na" by himself
- "Always Panalo sa Puregold" by Himself, later covered by Willie Revillame
- "Crush" (Luv U theme song) by Tweens of Pop

== Albums ==
- Sino Camo? (Viva Records, 1998)
- Ano Camo? (BMG Records, 2002)
- Ako Naman! (Star Records, 2005)
- Lito Camo - The 31 Ultimate Collection (2004)

== Filmography ==
=== Television ===
- Daisy Siete (GMA 7, 2003)
- Maynila (GMA 7, 2005–2020) - cameo appearance
- Yes, Yes Show! (ABS-CBN 2, 2004–2005)
- Wowowee (ABS-CBN 2, 2005–2010)
- Show Me Da Manny (GMA 7, 2009–2011)
- Willing Willie (TV5, 2010–2011)
- Wiltime Bigtime (TV5, 2011–2012)
- Wowowillie (TV5, 2013)
- Sabado Badoo (GMA 7, 2015) - cameo footage featured
- Wowowin (GMA 7/ALLTV2, 2015–2023)
- FPJ's Batang Quiapo (Kapamilya Channel/A2Z 11/TV5, 2023–2024)
- Wil To Win (TV5/RPTV 9, 2024–2025)
- Wilyonaryo (WilTV, 2026)
- Eat Bulaga! (TV5/RPTV 9/Kapatid Channel, 2026)
- Sigabo (Kapamilya Channel/A2Z 11/ALLTV2/TV5, 2026)
