= List of Midnight DJ episodes =

Midnight DJ is a Filipino reality drama horror television series starring Paolo Contis and Oyo Boy Sotto, who works as DJ at night and at the same time he works to find solutions to the action paranormal problems of his listeners. The series debuted in 2008 on TV5.

== Episode list ==
=== Season 1: August 11, 2008 - November 3, 2008 ===
Season 1 introduces us to the Midnight DJ team. Midnight DJ is a weekly radio show hosted by Patrick (Paolo Contis), the Midnight DJ who's got an open third eye. Other members of the Midnight DJ team include Andrea (Desiree del Valle), the show's producer and Bodjie (Joaqui Tupas), the team's driver and camera man. The Midnight crew is managed by Trixie (Jenny Miller).

Together the team solve cases submitted by avid listeners of the radio show. At the end of the season 1, Patrick dies while solving another mystery.

No.	Title	Original release date	Paranormal occurrence
1	"Rampage" "Pilot"	August 11, 2008	Ghost
A tragic event hits Rampage, one of the Metro's hippest clubs with hundreds of casualties. The victims were burned to death, while survivors were left with permanent scars physically and psychologically. The incident is a hot topic for discussion on the Metro's top-rated radio program, Midnight DJ, as halloween and the anniversary of the tragedy approaches. Midnight DJ, hosted by cool and cocky disc jockey/host, Patrick has his share of hauntings and refuses to acknowledge their presence at first, but their constant appearance can no longer be ignored. They show up for a reason, and for them, it is with Patricks help that their issues are unresolved. This is just the beginning of Patrick’s journey into the world of the unknown. How can he survive this web of mysterious events unscathed? Guests: CJ Ramos, Charee Pineda
2	"Zombie"	August 18, 2008	Zombie
Patrick, the Midnight DJ, has been receiving calls that a zombie has been sighted terrorizing the city. Incredulous of the news, he sends his researcher, Andrea, to investigate on the matter. Andrea does not need to search far, because the zombie too is looking for her. She recognizes the dead man walking as Billy (Lester Llansang), the cab driver she got into an accident with while riding his cab to work. She realizes that during the accident, Billy mysterious inhaled a substance from a vial left in his cab. The substance making him a zombie. The zombie, turns out to have some unresolved issues with his father that the team helps him fix the unfinished business with his father. And he seeks the help of Patrick and Andrea to bring him to his final resting place. Guests: Lester Llansang as Billy, Neil Ryan Sese as Billy's father, Nonie Buencamino as Patrick's father
3	"Hole In The Wall"	August 25, 2008	Ghost
Patrick and the team argue over who to hire as the new intern named Almira (Tess Bomb), a plus-sized dependable worker and an occult fanatic or Misty (Jade Lopez), a vivacious sexy self-absorbed girl Paolo met at a club. So as not to be blamed of judging books by their covers, the team decides to take on both the girls for a week, to see who is deserving of the job. Then, an earthquake hits the metro. A wall in Trixie's office collapses revealing the remains of a child (Ella Guevara) from within. Soon a series of poltergeist activities and killings ensue with Misty and Trixie becoming victims. Patrick has to find out what really happened to the child buried in the wall. Are the hauntings the child ghost's wrath? Guests: Tess Bomb as Almira, Jade Lopez as Misty, Ella Guevara as Alice (child ghost)
4	"Haunted House"	September 1, 2008	Haunted House/Doppelganger/Soul-snatching demons/Curse
A new intern applicant named Jasmin (Maui Taylor) invites the Midnight DJ crew to their ancestral house, claiming that there’s an interesting supernatural story there that would surely land her the job. Patrick being a sucker for anything super natural agreed to go instantly, bringing Andrea and Bodjie in tow. The house, as it turns out, hides a very dangerous secret – a cursed mirror that serves as a portal for soul-snatching demons. As soon as the Midnight DJ crew settle in, they immediately explore the house to unravel its mysteries. But as bad luck would have it, the mystery pounces on them first. Unbeknownst to Patrick, Andrea’s soul was snatched and her body was replaced by a doppelganger. Patrick, realizing their dilemma, must now muster all his wits to trick the doppelganger to open the portal, paving the way to finally save Andrea’s soul before it’s consumed by the demons. Guests: Maui Taylor as Jasmin, Hermie Concepcion as Nana Inez
5	"Vampires (Part I)"	September 8, 2008	Vampire
Patrick decides to investigate club Rojo, an underground club rumored to be a vampire hub. True to form he finds himself a lady who warms up to him, Nika (Margaret Wilson), who says she's a vampire. But much to Nika’s dismay, despite putting on a great 'interview with a vampire' on air, she is revealed to be a fraud by Andrea. As it turns out, she is Andrea’s delinquent cousin. Even though Nika is a faux-vampire, there is still some truth to her testimony because Rojo is indeed a venue for true-blue Vampires to propagate their culture while selling drugs on the side. When the vampires, behind club Rojo – Iñigo (Ryan Eigenmann), Sara (Dimples Romana), and Alex (Chubi del Rosario) — hear of Nika’s attempts to expose them, they quickly dispatched Alex, Nika’s lover, to hunt her down. Alex succeeds in kidnapping Nika, leaving Patrick and Andrea no choice but to rescue her. Patrick succeeds in saving Nika before the vampires put her up for sacrifice before their sacred feeding ritual. Patrick also succeeds in foiling the vampire’s drug dealing schemes. But all his success is accomplished not without a dire price: Patrick himself gets bitten as he successfully destroys his vampire foe. Patrick must now face the wrath of Alex’s surviving siblings, Iñigo and Sara, and at the same time find a way to stop from turning into a bloodthirsty vampire himself. Guests: Ryan Eigenmann as Iñigo, Dimples Romana as Sara, Chubi del Rosario as Alex, Margaret Wilson as Nika
6	"Vampires (Part II)"	September 15, 2008	Vampire
Patrick may be a headache for his team but this time it's reach unbearable levels. Ratings are dropping as he continues to pursue the vampire story. Andrea, his Producer is particularly affected with his scathing remarks. Unknown to the team, Patrick is slowly turning into a vampire as a result of Alex's (Chubi del Rosario) dying bite. He soon discovers that the only way he could stop from turning is to successfully destroy the bloodstone, a supernatural gem that holds all the powers of a vampire clan. This is not be an easy feat since the bloodstone is in the hands of Iñigo (Ryan Eigenmann) and Sara (Dimples Romana), two vampires keen on seeing Patrick turned into one of them. As the full moon approaches, marking Patrick’s full transformation into being a vampire, and his thirst for blood growing stronger every night, he must race against time to outwit his powerful adversaries before he becomes a bloodthirsty fiend himself. Guests: Ryan Eigenmann as Iñigo, Dimples Romana as Sara, Chubi del Rosario as Alex, Margaret Wilson as Nika
7	"Haunted Car"	September 22, 2008	Haunted Car
Bodjie buys a second-hand car and discovers that it is haunted. Patrick exchanges cars with him to attempt to solve the case. In the process discovering that the former owner Mylene (Say Alonzo), is haunting the car because of some unfinished business. Patrick discovers that Mylene accidentally run over a soldier one night. The soldier gave her a letter before he died but Mylene failed to deliver it. The soldier started haunting Mylene until she too died from a car accident. Since then, the soldier haunts the street where he died. Now, Patrick has to deliver the message to the soldier’s wife before the ghost of the soldier kills a motorist again. Guests: Jan Marini as Lydia, Gerard Pizarras as Oca, Say Alonzo as Mylene, Karla Estrada as Mylene's mother
8	"Possession"	September 29, 2008	Spirit possession
Patrick, accompanied by Andrea and Bodjie, goes to the house of Madame Vanda (Sylvia Sanchez) to convince the latter to guest on the Midnight DJ show. Patrick is bent on getting the middle-aged woman as a guest as she is considered among the young questors’ circle as the ‘rock star’ in exorcism. But Madame Vanda is not the least interested. On their way back to Manila, the group’s car breaks down in the middle of nowhere. They go to a nearby house to look for a mechanic and encounter something unexpected. A young woman is possessed by an evil spirit who wants to destroy her. With the help of Madame Vanda, the young woman is freed from its powerful oppressor. Or so they think. The lullaby that the possessed young woman sings haunts Patrick. He is quite sure that he has heard the same tune in the past. And he is right, it is not Patrick’s first encounter with the same evil spirit. In fact, it has haunted him since he was twelve. Guests: Sylvia Sanchez as Madame Vanda, Aiza Marquez as Lulay, Renz Valerio as young Patrick, Sandy Talag as young Pia
9	"Ukay-ukay" "Secondhand Clothes Store"	October 6, 2008	Ghost
Patrick, Andrea, Trixie and Bodjie go to a second-hand clothes store. All except Trixie get their own great finds - Andrea gets a blazer, Patrick gets a jacket and Bodjie a pair of sneakers. Trixie being the picky type is the only one who opts not to go for the bargain. What happens after are hauntings that seemingly bind them together. Patrick looks at his reflection in the mirror and sees an angry man when he wears his jacket. Bodjie suffers from mischievous pranks when he wears his sneakers. Andrea, clad in her blazer, reflexively goes to the edge of a rooftop with the intention of ending the pain and anguish she feels for a girl she does not even know. They trace the source of the hauntings to their ukay purchases. They trace the source of the ukay and discover that the three souls haunting them are still alive! There is a deeper reason why they feel the emotions or act out the thoughts of the man, the teenage boy and the young woman to whom the ukay-ukay clothes are originally intended for. Guests: Lovely Rivero as Luz Lauron, Allan Paule as Jose Lauron, Isabella de Leon as Jocelyn Lauron, Goyong as Junjun Lauron
10	"Polaroid"	October 13, 2008	Spirit photography
Cleo (Empress Schuck), an avid photographer, buys a secondhand Polaroid camera. A Polaroid camera with its own story. Cleo freaks out when she realizes that no matter where she points the camera, the pictures always show her wearing the same clothes but with different backgrounds. She asks the help of Patrick and in the process, they trace the camera to Carlo (Jason Abalos) who recognizes it as his gift to his invalid sister Celine (Roxanne Barcelo), who died just 2 months previous from a drowning accident. They discover that Celine is haunting his brother and is now using the Polaroid to give them clues about her death. Patrick and Andrea, with the help of Cleo, soon find out that Carmen, Cleo’s aunt (January Isaac), killed her and they have to stop her from killing again. Guests: Empress Schuck as Cleo, Jason Abalos as Carlo, Roxanne Barcelo as Celine, January Isaac as Auntie Karmen
11	"Pets"	October 20, 2008	TBA
12	"Eclipse"	October 27, 2008	Curse
13	"Isla" "Island"	November 3, 2008; November 8, 2008 (Replay)	Merman/Island/Monster
The 1st season finale.

=== Season 2: November 22, 2008 - February 21, 2009 ===
Six months have passed; LXFM ratings have gone down, and Trixie knows that the only way to bring them up is to revive their top rated program, Midnight DJ.

Andrea, still heartbroken over the loss of Midnight DJ's previous host, Patrick (Paolo Contis), has just been promoted from Producer to Programming Director, by Trixie, and her first task as the boss is to fill the shoes of Patrick.

No.	Title	Original release date	Paranormal occurrence
14	"Mga Nawawalang Bata" "The Missing Children"	November 22, 2008	Vengeful Spirit
With sidekick Bodjie and newly hired researcher, Samantha, the team sets off with their applicants for the Midnight DJ host, Andy (Baron Geisler), Samboy (Oyo Sotto) and Shugo (Paolo Paraiso), to solve the orphanage massacre haunting.
15	"May Demonyo sa Condo" "The Condemned Condominium"	November 29, 2008	Demon/Phantom/Witch
Trying to prove himself, Samboy takes on the case of a haunted Condotel where he meets Berna (Kristine Hermosa), his ex-girlfriend. Berna is making sure that the last family is gone before the building is turned over to the new owner. Knowing Berna as a fellow con artist, he tries to prove that it’s Berna who’s doing the fake hauntings to scare the family away. It’s Samantha who discovers that an angry spirit has been turned loose and will hurt or kill anybody on his way. In the end, Samboy helps Samantha get rid of the spirit but it doesn’t stop Samantha from starting to doubt Samboy’s ability as the Midnight DJ.
16	"Parola" "Lighthouse"	December 6, 2008	Ghost
A supposed getaway for the MDJ crew turns into mystery when the nearby lighthouse haunts the residents below it. The team investigates the lighthouse as well as Trixie's connections to the place. Guests: Ejay Falcon, Dionne Monsanto, Kier Legaspi, Richard Quan
17	"Aswang"	December 13, 2008	Aswang
18	"Multong Bakla" "The Gay Ghost"	December 20, 2008	Ghost
A gay ghost who has unfinished business returns to make sure that the man he loves is safe. Guests: RS Francisco, Joross Gamboa, Gio Alvarez as Bene
19	"Bloody Christmas Tree"	December 27, 2008	Ent
20	"High School Kulam" "High School Witchcraft"	January 3, 2009	Voodoo/Mangkukulam
A bullied student who practices witchcraft terrorizes her fellow students in their school. Guests: Niña Jose as Frey, Andi Eigenmann as Betty, Justin Rosana as Iris Acosta, Dang Amistad as Jovy, Erlinda Villalobos as Martha Paclibar, Tess Gonzales
21	"Padyak" "Pedicab"	January 10, 2009	Vengeful Spirit
A pedicab driver named Boyet, he was stabbed to death by those teenagers, and months later, the pedicab haunts the city and takes revenge on the teenagers who killed him. Guests: John James Uy as Boyet, Ace Mariano, Jesus Miguel Valdes, Lao Rodriguez, Joel Molina, Mach Duran, Vic Belaro, Ama Quiambao as Lola Fely
22	"Demon Cellphone Number"	January 17, 2009	Demon
A group of teenagers die after receiving a mysterious phone call. In the end, it is revealed that a demon comes to the receiver of the phone call.
23	"Killer Kubeta" "Killer Toilet"	January 24, 2009	Vengeful Spirit
Reported cases of missing people at a local park start piling up. Samantha thinks that paranormal activities are at play in this particular case, but Andrea and Bodie are doubtful. But with Samboy’s prodding, the whole team ultimately decides to go check out the park.
24	"Scary Retoke" "Scary Plastic Surgery"	January 31, 2009	Vengeful Spirit/Ghost
The Midnight DJ crew investigates the attacks of the patients in a cosmetic clinic. Guests: Jodi Sta. Maria as Dr. Carissa Leano, Rafael Rosell as Dr. Jared
25	"Tiyanak sa Squatter" "Tiyanak in the Slums"	February 7, 2009	Tiyanak
A series of killings lead the MDJ team deeper into mystery, and just when they think they have failed, they emerge victorious in a most unusual way. Guests: Robert "Buboy" Villar, Boy Salvador, Angel Estrada, Ketchup Eusebio, Gene Padilla, Eva Darren
26	"Bruhang Parlor" "Witch in the Parlor"	February 14, 2009	Bruha
A new beauty salon opens with a special offer — a make over. The beautician can turn an old woman to her teenage self, but the price of looking young is her soul. Guests: Thou Reyes as Helga, Nikki Bacolod as Florence, Flora Gasser as Aling Trining, Ama Quiambao as Lola Fely, Tiya Pusit as Lola Insyang
27	"Sisig... Sisig, Paano ka ginawa?" "Sisig... Sisig... How were you made?"	February 21, 2009	Cannibalism
The 2nd season finale. The Midnight Dj crew investigates a town where the people who has eaten sisig, turns into rabid human flesh-eaters. Guests: Gerry Acao, Mitoy Yonting, Jojo Bolado, Caloy Alde, Richie D'Horsie

=== Season 3: February 28, 2009 - May 30, 2009 ===
No.	Title	Original release date	Paranormal occurrence
28	"Halimaw sa Bayong" "Monster in a Bag"	February 28, 2009	Snake Demon
The team investigates the deaths of people instigated by a demon inside the "bayong". Guests: Baron Geisler as Andy, Mura (actor) as Snake Demon
29	"Pasada ng Kamatayan" "The Ride of Death"	March 7, 2009	Phantom hitchhiker
A phantom jeepney driver hitches a ride with the passing jeepneys. Guests: Arron Villaflor as RJ, Lao Rodriguez, Mon Confiado as Rod Vicente
30	"Tsinelas na Malas" "The Unfortunate Slipper."	March 14, 2009	Vengeful Spirit
A father kills his daughter accidentally when beating her. The girl's spirit haunts the slippers used by her father to beat her. The slippers eventually lead the abusive parents to their death.
31	"Babae Sa Batis" "Lady in the River"	March 21, 2009	Siren/White Lady/Nymph
A lady who haunts the river lures men and eat them afterwards. Guests: Josef Elizalde as Arthur / Alex, Beauty Gonzalez as Lorraine, JR de Guzman as Jepoy, Charles Christianson as Kiko, Bela Padilla as Erika, Precious Adona as a lady in river
32	"Kasal ng Tikbalang" "Wedding of the Tikbalang"	March 28, 2009	Tikbalang
A girl has a tikbalang for a secret admirer. Guests: Melissa Ricks as Lynette, PJ Valerio, Derek Viray, Mikan Ong, TJ Valderrama, Rolando Innocencio, Maritess Samson, Audie Gemora
33	"Higanti ng Kariton" "Revenge of the Cart"	April 4, 2009	Vengeful Spirit
The crew investigates the case of the mysterious Hit-and-runs. Guests: Aldred Gatchalian, John Alba, Menggie Cobarrubias, Ana Capri
34	"Nuno sa Punso" "The Dwarf of the Mound"	April 18, 2009	Nuno sa Punso
A dwarf or "nuno" haunts the family that disturbed its home. Guests: Joshua Dionisio, Leon Miguel as Badong, Jordan Herrera
35	"Atake... ng Videoke!" "Attack of the Karaoke"	April 25, 2009	Curse/Spirit
The Midnight DJ team investigates the mysterious murders perpetrated by a cursed Karaoke machine. Guests: Mica Roi Torre, Anna Melissa, Rolly Gallo, Bugoy Drilon as Estong, Makisig Morales as OX
36	"Payasong... Pasaway!" "The Troublesome Clown"	May 2, 2009	Evil clown
A disturbing clown with a tragic past abducts children who are celebrating their birthdays. Guests: Quintin Alianza, Kyle Balili, Sandy Talag, Dwight Gaston
37	"Babae sa Batis: Ang Pagbabalik" "The Comeback of the Lady in the River"	May 9, 2009	Siren/White Lady/Nymph
The lady in the river is back again to haunt and kill Arthur, the surviving twin of Alex. Guests: Josef Elizalde as Arthur / Alex, Chris Gutierrez, Wendy Valdez, Rolando Innocencio, John Medina as Xander, Precious Adona
38	"Killer... Boxing Gloves!"	May 16, 2009	Demon
A desperate boxer makes a pact with the devil – a pair of boxing gloves that beats or kills his opponent, in exchange of something he regrets to death. Guests: Nikki Bacolod, Dan Samson, Micah Muñoz, Hugo Linsangan, Amy Robles, Dick Israel, Sid Lucero
39	"Santa Cruzan... de Muerte!" "Santacruzan of Death"	May 23, 2009	Zombie
Seven beautiful but dead young ladies parade in their fabulous Santacruzan gowns to hunt and kill the male relatives of the men who broke their hearts. Guests: Nicole Uysiuseng, Benjamin Besa, Arvee Quizon, Christian Valleser, Rolando Innocencio, Cynthia Yapchingco, Sheena Flores, Shane Gonzales, Jacky Rivas
40	"Kambal Kuba" "Hunchbacked Twins"	May 30, 2009	Twin Demon
The 3rd season finale. A teenage hunchback girl, unwanted by everyone except by her mother, longs for acceptance, understanding, and love. She ends up killing people who regard her as a freak and even her own father because she has received none of what she has desired. Guests: Xian Lim as Chuck, Nikki Bagaporo, Marcos Pineda as Danny, Valeen Montenegro as Trish, Lauren Young as Kara (with her twin sister, Mara), Joanne Quintas as Linda

=== Season 4: June 6, 2009 - September 5, 2009 ===
No.	Title	Original release date	Paranormal occurrence
41	"High School Sapi" "High School Possession"	June 6, 2009	Spirit possession/Demonic possession
A demon terrorizes and simultaneously possesses a group of students at a local high school resulting in the death of a teacher.
42	"Killer... Washing Machine!"	June 13, 2009	Vengeful Spirit
The Midnight DJ crew investigates the case of a killer washing machine. Guests: Julio Pisk as Raffy Mapa, Bea Binene as Wendy Mapa, Joshua Dionisio as Dennis Mapa, Jan Marini as Mrs. Mapa, Gerard Pizarras as Mr. Mapa, Ruffa Mi as Girlie, Don Umali
43	"Lingkis ng Taong Ahas" "Encircling of the Human Snake"	June 20, 2009	Half-human/Half-snake demon
A teenage boy, with a human head and the body of a snake, avenges the murder of his beloved lola. Guests: AJ Dee as Sebastian / Basti (half-human, half-snake), Lao Rodriguez, Mach Duran, Jojo Bolado, Perla Bautista as Lola Martha
44	"Tiktik... Sa Maynila!" "Tiktik in Manila"	June 27, 2009	Tiktik
A tiktik is terrorizing a local hospital by killing pregnant women and eating their unborn babies. Guests: Niña Dolino as Nurse Linda Castro, Joann Y. Co, Joan Marie Bugcat
45	"Akin ka... Manekin!" "You're mine, Mannequin"	July 4, 2009	Spirit
A mannequin comes to life and wreaks havoc. Guests: Angel Estrada as Yvie, Red Anderson as a mannequin, Ron Morales as Robbie, Michelle Mercado as Terry, Charee Pineda as Carla
46	"Pabrika ng Multo" "Ghost Factory"	July 11, 2009	Vengeful Spirit
Angry ghosts haunt a factory to exact revenge on the person who orchestrated their death.
47	"Killer... Teddy Bear!"	July 18, 2009	Vengeful Spirit
The Midnight DJ crew investigate a series of mysterious infantile deaths. Guests: Carl Alexander Acosta, Angeli Nicole Sanoy as Nicole, Giovanni Baldisseri, Eile Velasco, Ida Pomarejos, Jessy Mendiola, Malou Martillo, Richard Cawed, Julian Trono as Rainier
48	"Oink! Oink!"	July 25, 2009	half-pig/half-human creature
The Midnight DJ crew, along with their new psychic, Max solve the mysterious disappearances of humans leaving behind only their clothes.
49	"Gayuma ng Panget" "Love Potion for the Ugly"	August 1, 2009	Curse/Potion
The Midnight DJ investigate cases of women getting ugly after breaking up with a cursed man. Guests: Andrew E., Aira Bermudez
50	"Manananggal... Sa Campus!" "The Manananggal on Campus"	August 8, 2009	Manananggal
While visiting the Polytechnic University of Panay, the Midnight DJ crew bumps into a trail of manananggal attacks. Guests: Helga Krapf as Criselda Garcia, Michelle Gallaga as Rosa Ibarra, Carlo Aquino as Ramon Ibarra, Yayo Aguila as Ms. Pilar Gatdula
51	"Payong... na Pumapatay!" "Killer Umbrella"	August 15, 2009	Vengeful Spirit
A woman who murdered her ex-lover with an umbrella now haunts her when his spirit possesses the same weapon that was used to kill him. Guests: Chase Vega, Andrew Schimmer, Alwyn Uytingco as Boom, Roxanne Guinoo as Kit
52	"Halimaw sa Puno ng Saging" "Monster in the Banana Tree"	August 22, 2009	Monster
The Midnight DJ crew investigates the death of a teenage boy and a young boy becoming linked when the 2 boys untie a rope of a banana tree which is said to be haunted by a monster. Guests: Philip Nolasco as Jonjon, Chris Gutierrez as Mark, Shiela Marie Rodriguez, Ces Aldaba as Mang Lando, Mike Magat, Mon Confiado, Michelle Madrigal, Liza Ranillo
53	"Higanti... ng Kamatayan!" "Death's Revenge"	August 29, 2009	Manananggal/Aswang
The 4th season finale. The mother of Ramon Ibarra who was a manananggal in the previous episode "Manananggal sa Campus" returns to take revenge on the Midnight DJ team for killing her son. Guests: Bella Padilla as Jenny Garcia, Michelle Gallaga as Rosa Ibarra, BJ Forbes as Junjun, Arlene Tolibas as Miss Garcia, Joonee Gamboa as Mr. Ibarra

=== Season 5: September 12, 2009 - December 12, 2009 ===
No.	Title	Original release date	Paranormal occurrence
54	"Sikreto ng Salamangkero" "The Magician's Secret"	September 12, 2009	Werewolf
The Midnight DJ crew looks for a cure to prevent Samboy from transforming into a werewolf-like creature.
55	"Taong Kandila" "Man of Wax"	September 19, 2009	Spontaneous Human Combustion
A creature who lives inside its victim bursts into life, leaving the unfortunate victims ripped apart. The team then finds a way to defeat the abomination. Guests: Froilan Sales as a doctor, Joel Molina as Fidel Garcia, Zeppi Borromeo as Ivan's brother, Joem Bascon as Ivan, Dimples Romana as Fidel's wife, Ama Quiambao as Lola Fely
56	"Kwintas ng Mangkukulam" "The Witch's Necklace"	October 3, 2009	Witchcraft/Voodoo/Mangkukulam
Samboy and crew track down a witch who allegedly murdered a married man. Guests: Lilia Cuntapay as old Rosanna, Regine Angeles as Amanda, Maricar Reyes as younger Rosanna, Eva Darren as Aling Tacing, Ida Pomarejos as Madam
57	"Lukalukang... Peluka!" "The Crazy Wig"	October 10, 2009	Vengeful Spirit
The Midnight DJ crew investigate a series of murders in a gay bar. Guests: Quins of the Library, Mel Martinez as Mother Mega, Paolo Ballesteros as Mauricio "Shine" Sandoval, Soxy Topacio as Kuya V
58	"Puppet... Na Malupet!" "The Awesome Puppet"	October 17, 2009	Vengeful Spirit/Spirit possession
The Midnight DJ crew investigates and confronts the puppet that controls humans when it is touched. Guests: Marvin Raymundo as a doctor, Lemuel Pelayo as Oliver, Carlo Lacana as Toto, Justin Rosana as a nurse, Wanlu as Luwan, Matet de Leon as Aling Inday
59	"Baha" "Flood"	October 24, 2009	Ghost/Spirit
A woman living in a condominium is haunted by victims of a flood that killed them. The team eventually finds out the truth wherein the woman in the condominium was also killed when the building flooded. Guests: Gian Sotto, Denise Laurel
60	"Bloody... Bride!"	October 31, 2009	Vengeful Spirit/Ghost
The Midnight DJ crew is called to fight the spirit of a broken-hearted woman who caused a series of accidents. Guests: Michelle Madrigal as Kath Carillo, Jon Avila as Boyet, Joan Marie Bugcat as Sam, Mimi Orara as Stephanie
61	"Ligaw... Na Sementeryo!" "The Lost Cemetery"	November 7, 2009	Witch/Zombie
A clan of "mangkukulam" (warlocks) haunt Santa Catalina to find those responsible for their deaths. Guests: Dwight Gaston as Captain Torres, Ian de Leon as Father Mariano, Perla Bautista
62	"Pamilyang...Aswang!" "The Aswang Family"	November 14, 2009	Aswang
A car trouble forces the Midnight DJ crew to find shelter in the house of a family of "Aswangs". Guests: Maxine Eigenmann, Ella Guevara, Vincent de Jesus, Jordan Herrera
63	"Karma... ng Killer Kama!" "Karma of the Killer Bed"	November 21, 2009	Vengeful Spirit/Ghost
A haunted bed kills the ones occupying it. Guests: AJ Dee, Izzy Trazona, Philip Nolasco, Louise Bolton, Jack Rodrigo, Cynthia Yapchingco
64	"Mambabarang" "Evil Sorceress"	November 28, 2009	Voodoo/Mambabarang
A "mambabarang" terrorizes the young man who broke her daughter's heart. Now the MDJ crew must find a way to stop her. Guests: Rodjun Cruz, Gina Alajar
65	"Campus Bampira" "Vampire Campus"	December 5, 2009	Vampire
The Midnight DJ crew travels to a University to investigate a series of vampire attacks. Guests: Joseph Bitangcol as Bryan Sanchez, Dino Imperial as Justin, Josef Elizalde as Jojo Santos, JR de Guzman as Mark Soriano
66	"Atake Ng Elemento" "Attack of the Elements"	December 12, 2009	Elementals/Demonic possession/Spirit possession
The 5th season finale. An elemental traps the Midnight DJ team with Andrea as its vessel that would lead to her eventual death. Guests: Ramon Christopher Gutierrez as Rod, Cherry Lou Agassi as Flor, Isabella de Leon as Grace

=== Season 6: December 19, 2009 - March 13, 2010 ===
No.	Title	Original release date	Paranormal occurrence
67	"Itim na Santa" "Black Santa"	December 19, 2009	Yule Lads
The Midnight DJ crew investigates the disappearances of little kids in a sleepy town during the Christmas season. Guests: BJ Forbes as Borgy, Julio Pisk as Marlon, Carlo Lacana as Franco, Franchesca Salcedo as Yay, Jinky Laurel as Yay's mother, Liza Ranillo as Franco's mother, Shamaine Buencamino as Borgy's mother, Jojit Lorenzo as Prince
68	"Lapida" "The Tombstone"	December 26, 2009	Ghost/Cemetery/Vengeful Spirit
A group of friends are dying one by one. The Midnight DJ crew soon finds out that a ghost whom the friends raped is the one responsible for their deaths. Guests: Vandolph, Empress Schuck as Aubrey, Boy 2 Quizon, Jubail Andres as Gordon, Rico Barrera
69	"Batang Puno" "The Young Tree"	January 2, 2010	Ent
The Midnight DJ crew investigates mysterious attacks caused by a small living child that had been sculpted from a tree. Guests: Manilyn Reynes as Esmeralda "Esme" Gonzalo, Lander Vera-Perez as Fernando "Fernan" Gonzalo
70	"Pangakong na-Usog" "The Warlock's Promise"	January 9, 2010	Voodoo/Mangkukulam
The Midnight DJ crew investigates the case of the actress who offended a mangkukulam. Guests: Ehra Madrigal as Roxanne Soriano, RS Francisco as Rocky, Angel Sy as Cacai Balagtas, Jan Marini as Flora Balagtas
71	"Sakla" "Gambit"	January 16, 2010	Spirit
The Midnight DJ crew investigates the mysterious deaths of gamblers who are beheaded by what appears to be the "King" of cards. Guests: Mitoy Yonting as Berting, Richie D'Horsie, Dennis Padilla, Joko Bolado as Caloy
72	"Hoy! Hoy! Siyokoy!" "Hey! Hey! Siyokoy!"	January 23, 2010	Siyokoy/Merman
The Midnight DJ crew gets a call from Ka Tokleng asking for assistance on the mysterious death of a fisherman. Guests: Vangie Labalan as Aling Tale, Leon Miguel as Berto, Carlon Matobato as Isko, Dang Amistad as Victim 1, Justin Rosana as Belen, Zyrus Desamparado as Victim 2, Joann Co as Tubeng, Patani Daño as Isko's wife
73	"Buhay na Wheel chair" "Weird Wheelchair"	January 30, 2010	Vengeful Spirit
An ordinary wheelchair haunts the young girl Daisa (Angeli Nicole Sanoy) and her family. The team finds out who is possessing the wheelchair and how to stop it from haunting the young girl and her family. Guests: Dang Cruz as Yaya Marie, Bettina Carlos as Tita Chona, Angeli Nicole Sanoy as Daisa, Ian de Leon as Tito Melchor
74	"JS Prom Nightmare"	February 6, 2010	Vengeful Spirit
A school outcast gets run over by a van when trying to get away from the people who pick on her. The man who ran her over, a mysterious man in black, offers her beauty and confidence. Two days later she goes to school with a new look. Along with her change in appearance is a change in her humanity. Guests: Xian Lim as Justin, Lauren Young as Linda San Juan / Lindsay, Arron Villaflor as Raffy, Cheska Ortega as Britney, Froilan Sales as Mr. Garcia, Beauty Gonzalez as Britney's friend, Christa Papa as Britney's friend
75	"Valentine Monsters"	February 13, 2010	Feral Monster
A trio of good-looking Brazilian guys (Thou Reyes, Will Devaughn, Adrian Policarpio) are actually monsters who absorb the souls of women they come across with. Guests: Priscilla Meirelles as Claudia, Max Collins (credited as Isabelle Abiera) as Sasha, Thou Reyes as Marcel, Will Devaughn as Elan, Adrian Policarpio as Benicio
76	"Multo...Sa ilalim Ng Tulay" "The Ghost Under the Bridge"	February 20, 2010	Ghost
What appears as a traversable and quiet bridge actually keeps a secret: under the bridge is the spirit of a young girl who seems to have connections with an elderly woman named Carmela. The team investigates the bridge's history and the elder woman's ties with the spirit in the bridge. Guests: Danica Sotto-Pingris as Pilar, Bong Regala as Engr. Ricardo Palisoc, Mariel Pamintuan as Leila, Crystal Jane Cristobal as young Carmela, Alicia Alonzo as Carmela Palisoc)
77	"Scare crow"	February 27, 2010	Scarecrow/Monster
A murdered farmer now seeks revenge for those who killed him in the form of a terrifying scarecrow. Guests: Gardo Versoza as Mr. dela Cruz, Julienne Mendoza as Franco Manicud, Lao Rodriguez, Maui Manalo
78	"Toga to Death"	March 6, 2010	Ghost
The spirit of a murdered graduating student now haunts his co-graduates.
79	"Zombie Massacre"	March 13, 2010	Zombie/Mummy
The 6th season finale. The Midnight DJ crew gets a call from a nurse named Kimberly "Kimchi" Chi about a doctor trying to attack her. The team thinks that there's a paranormal occurrence happening. They later discover that almost all of the patients in the hospital have turned into zombies. Guests: Lucia Cristobal as Kimberly "Nurse Kimchi" Chi, Empoy Marquez, Charee Pineda, Angel Estrada, Bembol Roco as Dr. Panlilio

=== Season 7: March 20, 2010 - June 18, 2010 ===
No.	Title	Original release date	Paranormal occurrence
80	"Bentilador na Matador" "The Killer Electric Fan"	March 20, 2010	Vengeful Spirit
A vintage electric fan (Bentilador), one of the seemingly living witness to a Satanic cult, haunts and kills innocent people, plugged or unplugged. Guests: Zoren Legaspi as Jack, Regine Angeles as Marta, Gabby Fernandez as Raul, Lao Rodriguez as Master Lucio, Molts Meneses as Allan, Borgy Dones as Wack, Diane Medina as Girl (offering)
81	"Biyernes Alas Tres" "Friday 3 o'clock"	March 27, 2010	Demon/Alien/Evil Spirit
As the team goes for a Holy Week vacation coincidentally scheduled on 3:00 pm of Good Friday, the team soon find themselves into trouble when the demons led by Lucerah (Wendy Valdez) roam the earth celebrating the Lord's death. Guests: Wendy Valdez as Lucerah, Lilia Cuntapay as old women, Novy Bereber as nilalang
82	"Bata, Langit, Impyerno" "Kids, Heaven & Hell"	April 9, 2010	Demon/Evil Spirit
Lucerah (Wendy Valdez) and her infernal armies return to haunt the Midnight DJ team when the human incarnations of the 3 archangels [Miguel (Jon Avila), Gabriel (AJ Dee), Rafael (Enrique Gil)] arrive and save the team along with their newfound teammate, Swit (Julia Chua). Guests: Wendy Valdez as Lucerah, AJ Dee as Archangel Gabriel, Jon Avila as Archangel Miguel, Enrique Gil as Archangel Rafael
83	"Halimaw sa Tuod" "Monster Stump"	April 16, 2010	Monster
A once dead man is revived by Lucera (Wendy Valdez) to exact his revenge on those who murdered him.
84	"Espiritu ng Alak" "Spirit of the Wine"	April 23, 2010	Evil Spirit
They say that alcohol has a spirit that intoxicates people. What if there is really a physical spirit in a bottle of alcohol that not only gets people drunk but also kills them? Such is the case of a mysterious bartender who serves a very potent wine that puts whoever drinks it in grave danger. When a person gets instantly drunk after seconds of drinking the wine, a monstrous-looking spirit appears before him, follows him and eventually kills him.
85	"Bagsik ng Bulalakaw" "The Ferocity of the Meteor"	April 30, 2010	Alien
As a meteor falls from the sky, the town is terrorized by sinister aliens, leaving the crew to stop their path of destruction. Guests: Jade Lopez as Sally, Hiyasmin Neri as Debbie, Helga Krapf as Maureen
86	"Sinapiang Skateboard" "Possessed Skateboard"	May 7, 2010	Vengeful Spirit
After the death of a boy, his skateboard was found by a handicapped boy, promising the boy that he will give him legs if he kills the boy's killers. Guests: Carlo Lacana as Enzo, Mon Confiado as Mang Gener, Alwyn Uytingco as Cedrix, Carlo Aquino as Reynold, Erika Padilla as Reynold's sister, Marvin Raymundo as Migz, Eduard Duallo as Johann
87	"Halimaw sa Hamog" "The Monster in the Mist"	May 14, 2010	Monster
A monster who appears in the mist kills the villagers below the mountain before being defeated with a special wood from the mountain.
88	"Sikreto ng Swing" "The Swing's Secret"	May 21, 2010	Ghost/Vengeful Spirit
A supposedly harmless swing kills its victims. The team finds out who is possessing the swing and prevents it from killing more victims. Guests: BJ Forbes as Harvey, Kimberly Fulgar as Michelle, Richard Quan as Jake, Charee Pineda as Yaya Dyna
89	"Sakmal ng Askal" "A Mutt's Bite"	May 28, 2010	Monster/Werewolf
An innocent askal (stray dog) turns out to be a demonic animal that the Midnight DJ crew must stop. Guests: Max Eigenmann as Miriam, Ron Morales as Manny, Dexter Doria as Lola Cedes, JP Mesde as Choc
90	"Monster Bag"	June 4, 2010	Monster/Vengeful Spirit
An old-fashioned and vintage bag kills its victims, nearly killing Trixie before the MDJ team stop it. Guests: Christian Vasquez as Antonio, Jade Lopez as Lucy
91	"Kilabot sa Kulambo" "Terror in the Kulambo"	June 11, 2010	Batibat
A huge monster living in the kulambo weighs down and possesses its victims to kill them. Guests: Joshua Zamora as Kael, Jopay Paguia as Frennie, Encar Benedicto
92	"Ugat ng Engkanto" "The Fairy's Root"	June 18, 2010	Engkanto
The 7th season finale. An engkanto exacts revenge on his former lover. At the same time Lucera (Wendy Valdez) returns as a snake and successfully kills Kimchi (Lucia Cristobal), much to the grief of the Midnight DJ crew. Guests: Ping Medina as Raffy, Assunta de Rossi as Maya, Dianne Medina as Esmeralda

=== Season 8: June 25, 2010 - September 18, 2010 ===
No.	Title	Original release date	Paranormal occurrence
93	"Wakwak" "The Acute Wakwak"	June 25, 2010	Wakwak
A University Belt boarding house is bustling with the intertwined lives of a bunch of boarders. Macho fratman boyfriend Ben (Prince Estefan) beats up Cupcake (IC Mendoza), his girlfriend Dottie (Chynna Ortaleza), flamboyant gay best friend. Ben is found dead the following day--his stomach flayed open, innards missing. Dottie thinks Cupcake killed Ben and has him arrested. It’s only the call center agent and fellow boarder Luigi (Sid Lucero) who believes Cupcake is innocent. But Cupcake and Dottie's friendship is over. When another man is found dead with his belly open and innards missing, rumors abound that a creature called “Wakwak” is roaming the University Belt’s dormitory row. Who did it? Was it Cupcake? Creepy dorm caretaker Kuya Tony? Or is it someone unsuspicious? Desperate and afraid they might be next, a mysterious boarder calls in the Midnight DJ crew to figure it out before everyone in the boarding house ends up dead. Guests: Chynna Ortaleza as Dottie, IC Mendoza as Cupcake, Prince Estefan as Ben, Sid Lucero as Luigi, Rubi Rubi as Aling Ason
94	"Demonyong Hunyango" "The Demonic Chameleon"	July 2, 2010	Demon/Monster/Spirit
A demonic chameleon replicates its victims, killing their own version until it is stopped by the team.
95	"Itim na Belo" "The Black-Veiled Lady"	July 9, 2010	Ghost/Vengeful Spirit
A tormented "nun" in a black veil takes her revenge on the man who betrayed her when she was still alive. Guests: Aiza Marquez as Anya, Rufa Mi as Luchi, Sugar Mercado as Elda, Angel Estrada as Ivy, Arron Villaflor as Julius Cabrera, Bobby Andrews as Norman
96	"Tatlo sa Litrato" "Three in the Picture"	July 16, 2010	Ghost/Vengeful Spirit
Three guys had their photo taken at the same time, despite their grandmother's warning that the person in the middle will die. They soon die one-by-one, not because of the superstition but because of a crime they committed in the past. Also starring: Lauren Young as Jessie Soriano Guests: Alessandra de Rossi as Charo, Chubi del Rosario as RJ, JB de Leon as Emir, Dino Imperial as Jim
97	"Kalye Kamatayan" "Street of Death"	July 23, 2010	Ghost/Spirit
Samboy's supposed death devastates the crew, making him the "12th" victim needed to revive the dark, sinister man who dwelt by a wall connecting the astral and mortal world. Now Samboy must save his soul and 12 others to prevent the man from crossing the mortal world. Guests: Tommy Abuel as Manong, Carlo Lacana as a basahan boy, Lao Rodriguez as a wallman, Xian Lim as Jake Isaac
98	"Kamison de Hapon" "The Japanese-style Petticoat"	July 30, 2010	Ghost/Vengeful Spirit
The team stays by an age-old house wherein the ghost of a white lady resides. Unknown to them, the ghost warns them to leave as the spirit of a high-ranking Japanese official remains with her in the house. Guests: Joaqui Tupas as Caloy, Maui Taylor as Isay, Ricardo Cepeda as Major Gen. Jin
99	"Kalbaryo sa Sementeryo" "The Calvary in the Cemetery"	August 6, 2010	Ghost/Spirit
In his quest to find his father's grave, Samboy is led to an old and creepy cemetery where he meets the mysterious Bugoy, a boy being haunted by several ghosts. Also starring: Lauren Young as Jessie Guests: Julian Trono as Arnulfo "Bugoy" Angeles, Francine Prieto as Erlinda Angeles / The Bride, Nonie Buencamino as Gardo Angeles
100	"Bangkay Nananalakay" "The Attacking Corpse!"	August 13, 2010	Monster/Mummies/Spirit/Ghost/Zombie
What should have been a stress-free vacation in Bodjie's ancestral home in Baguio turns into a nightmare for the Midnight DJ crew when the mummy known as Apo Iweg comes to life. Guests: Nikki Valdez as Cita, Jun Urbano as Apo Kuling
101	"Bulong ng Demonyo" "The Demon's Whisper"	August 20, 2010	Demonic possession/Spirit possession/Hypnosis
Ready to go home from their vacation in Bodjie’s ancestral home in Baguio, the Midnight DJ crew gets a call from Jake (Xian Lim). Jessie (Lauren Young) has disappeared in an Inn where an entire family had earlier killed each other mysteriously. The Midnight DJ crew spends the night in the Inn and find Jessie under the spell of a demon. They also find a girl, Eleanor (Angeli Nicole Sanoy), who may not be as innocent as she seems. Guests: Angeli Nicole Sanoy as Eleanor, Lui Manansala as Aling Hobeng
102	"Kampon ng Jejemon" "Jejemon's Henchman"	August 27, 2010	Vengeful Spirit/Ghost
A brother kills his victims to revive his dead brother. Now the team must find a way to stop the tormented brother from living. Guests: Carlos Agassi as Lando, Cynthia Yapchingco as Mara, Lester Llansang as Jago, Jeffrey Tam as DJ Domeng
103	"Poot ng Mangkukulam" "The Warlock's Hate"	September 3, 2010	Voodoo/Mangkukulam/Spirit
The MDJ team returns to an orphanage where Samboy grew up as a kid. The team eventually finds out that a room where Samboy was said to be burned as a child was caused by a witch who passed her powers to her son. Guests: Bembol Roco as Manong, Renz Valerio as young Samboy, Carlo Lacana as young Lando, Kalila Aguilos as Sioning, Jerould Goldie Aceron as Empoy, Gabby Reinoso as Father Barbatos, Ces Aldaba as Father Inocencio
104	"Ang Pagbabalik ng Babae sa Balete Drive" "The Return of the Lady of Balete Drive"	September 11, 2010	White Lady
After a long hiatus, the “White Lady Of Balete Drive” is back and out to exact revenge. But beware, because she is not the usual foggy image that scares motorists along the stretch of Balete Drive. Instead, she utilizes electronic gadgets to scare and kill her victims. Who is the reinvented White Lady? Will the Midnight DJ crew be able to uncover the mystery behind the rebirth of this urban legend? Guests: Princess Ryan as Sasha, Joseph Bitangcol as Peter, JB de Leon as Christian, Diane Medina as Tammy (the ghost)
105	"Dedbol in a Major, Major way!" "Suredeath in a Major, Major way!"	September 18, 2010	Ghost
The 8th season finale. The MDJ team investigate the old theater named Teatro Liwanag wherein a gay pageant is taking place. As they go further in their investigation, the ghosts of 4 construction workers haunt the place and supposedly kill the ones behind their deaths. Guests: Mel Martinez as Kuya Boy, Paolo Ballesteros as Vincent / Venus, IC Mendoza as Miriam, Red Anderson as Noel, Bekimon as Gloria, Novy Bereber as Ruffa, Phil Noble as Doreen / Turing

=== Season 9: September 25, 2010 - December 18, 2010 ===
No.	Title	Original release date	Paranormal occurrence
106	"Inday ng Ondoy" "Ondoy's Maid"	September 25, 2010	Ghost/Spirit
Warren (Ramon Christopher Gutierrez) and Amanda's (Yayo Aguila) house had been damaged last year by the Ondoy flood. Now the couple and their little boy, Nathan (BJ Forbes), are moving back into the renovated house. Nathan soon discovers that a scary woman named Inday (Jade Lopez), who had been a victim of the typhoon Ondoy is haunting the house. Later on, they discovered that Inday was pregnant and founds out drowning inside the room wherein Warren commands her to get the jewelry box but she trapped and failed to go out. Amanda knows the truth that her own husband kills Inday. Guest Casts: Ramon Christopher Gutierrez as Warren Salvador, BJ Forbes as Nathaniel "Nathan" Salvador, Jade Lopez as Yaya Inday, Yayo Aguila as Amanda Salvador
107	"Higanti ng Manika" "The Doll's Revenge"	October 2, 2010	Spirit
An old man wanting to be with his dead granddaughter traps her soul in a "manika" to torment those who killed her. Guests: Celine Lim as Grace, Khaycee Aboloc as Jaja, Steven Claude Goyong as Obet, Jaime Fabregas as Tatang Eli
108	"Tattoo ng Kulto" "Tattoo of the Cult"	October 9, 2010	Monster/Babaylan
When the Midnight DJ crew finally goes on a long-overdue vacation in a beach resort in a remote island called Isla de Eternidad, they did not expect that there would be a serial killer on the island. As they investigate, they run into a group of suspicious young men, as well as a mysterious and beautiful tattoo artist. They soon discover that the serial killer isn't human at all but a tattooed monster, the protector of a cult called Tintados.
109	"Call Center...Death Center"	October 16, 2010	Ghost
To investigate a series of disappearances in a call center company, the Midnight DJ crew goes undercover as quirky call center agents. They get to know a mysterious young woman named Janet, who seems to be connected to an angry female ghost. Guests: Kier Legaspi, Maggie Wilson as Janet / Janice, Max Collins (credited as Isabelle Abiera) as Anna, Kim Gantioqui as JC, Thou Reyes as James
110	"Mga Pamahiin sa Patay" "Superstitious Beliefs about the Dead"	October 23, 2010	Ghost/Spirit
The team visits the Mata Family’s big old house, the home of Andrea’s college sorority sister, Nimfa (Helga Krapf). The Midnight DJ crew are there to pay their respects to Nimfa’s recently deceased grandmother, Salome (Dexter Doria). As the corpse of the reputedly nasty old woman lies in its casket awaiting burial, freak accidents and other misfortunes befall the household. Will the Midnight DJ crew uncover the family’s horrifying secrets? Guests: Meryll Soriano as Emmanuelle Mata, Helga Krapf as Nimfa Mata, Eda Nolan as Lolita Mata, Dexter Doria as Salome Mata, Rhea Sol Hiballes as Mata family's maid
111	"Sikreto ng Salamin" "The Mirror's Secret"	October 30, 2010	Ghost/Spirit
Looking for costumes for a Halloween party, Samboy meets the charming and beautiful Rosa (Arci Muñoz) and love seems to be in the air. Rosa has just started working in a thrift shop owned by a mysterious old woman named Milagrosa (Perla Bautista). Samboy, Rosa, and the rest of the Midnight DJ crew starts investigating the case, as they find out its mysterious origins. Guests: Arci Muñoz as Rosa, Hiyasmin Neri as young Milagrosa, Ella Guevara as Blanca, Michelle Rufo-Lazatin as Annaliza, Perla Bautista as old Milagrosa, Oyo Boy Sotto as Solomon Magos, Joaquin Tupas as Botchok
112	"Terror sa Talyer" "Terror in the Garage"	November 6, 2010	Ghost
David is a taxi driver who roams the city at night. The taxi he drives was once the property of his older brother, Ruben. When the ghost of a sampaguita girl starts haunting the taxi, David seeks the help of the Midnight DJ crew. Guests: Diana Zubiri as Faith, Richard Quan as Gibo, Marc Solis as David, Jojo Bolado as Ruben, Maui Manalo as Simon, Sandy Talag as a sampaguita girl
113	"Barangay Aswang" "Village of the Aswangs"	November 13, 2010	Aswang
The Midnight DJ crew encounters a dying reporter who leads them to a small village called Sitio De La Magra, which cannot be found in any map. Upon investigating, our heroes discover that the inhabitants of the entire village are creatures of the night: Aswang. Guests: Precious Lara Quigaman as Mayora Carmela, Dianne Medina as Misha, Annaliza "Milagring" Baldonado as Milagring, Rovielyn "Mariposa" Cabigquez as Mariposa, Lao Rodriguez as Mang Domeng, Leon Miguel as Allen, Kiel Rodriguez as Rupert Legaspi, Gerard Pizarras as Rex
114	"Perya ng Katatakutan" "Fair of Frightfulness"	November 20, 2010	Monster/Cannibalism
A creepy carnival has just arrived in town. Everyone who works in that carnival are freaky social outcasts, including the albino owner, Lucy (Valerie Concepcion). Guests: Valerie Concepcion as Lucinda "Lucy" Baltazar, AJ Dee as Rigor, Julia Chua as Swit, Dang Amistad as Lilith Baltazar
115	"The Wedding Monster"	November 27, 2010	Monster
Samboy receives a call from his best friend Berna (Kristine Hermosa) inviting him for her wedding. A timawak is on the loose and starts feeding off at the resort owned by Berna's future husband. Will they be able to stop the monster from killing more people and will Samboy finally tell Berna how he truly feels? Guests: Kristine Hermosa as Berna, Ruben Gonzaga as Timawak, Ron Morales as Julian, Red Anderson as Marlon, Ces Aldaba as Uncle Miguel
116	"Baklitang Manananggal!" "The Gay Manananggal"	December 4, 2010	Manananggal
A dying manananggal is in search for a female human to inherit the Blackstone that she's carrying inside her mouth but it turns out that she gave it to the gay Shakira who she thought was a woman. Guests: Epy Quizon as Sheldon / Shakira, Kitkat as Lukring, Jade Lopez as Isay
117	"Doble Kara....Doble Karma!!!"	December 11, 2010	Curse/Vengeful Spirit
Guests: Chynna Ortaleza as Kara, Dino Imperial as Bernard Castillo, Hermie Concepcion as old Kara / Hukloban, Alex Castro as Joel, Rhen Escaño as Chona Legaspi, Derek Viray as Jimboy Mercado, Mark Espinosa
118	"Tagay ng Diablo" "Shot of the Devil"	December 18, 2010	Demonic possession/Spirit possession/Devil
The 9th season finale. Guests: Vandolph as Renato "Nato" Rodriguez, Jeffrey Tam as Gringo, Cynthia Yapchingco as Kyla, Biboy Ramirez as Barok Espero, Andrew Schimmer as Roel Sebastian

=== Season 10: December 25, 2010 - March 26, 2011 ===
No.	Title	Original release date	Paranormal occurrence
119	"Misteryo ng Parol" "Mystery of the Parol"	December 25, 2010	Vengeful Spirit
A family excitedly moves in to their new house somewhere in Tagaytay a day before Christmas. Unbeknownst to them, a family composed of a couple and two children, were mercilessly murdered in the same house five years ago. Now that the house has new occupants, the ghosts of Christmas past make their presence felt to warn the family of the same family crime. Guests: Ricardo Cepeda as Rafael Salazar, Joanne Quintas as Flor Salazar, Kristel Moreno as Regine Salazar, BJ Forbes as Ryan Salazar, Gabby Reinoso, Sugar Mercado as Yaya Elsie, Kris Martinez as Rocky, Jack Rodrigo
120	"Sinturon ni Hudas" "Judas' Belt"	January 1, 2011	Vengeful Spirit
A series of deaths occur in an ongoing construction site where the Midnight DJ crew is supposed to move in. But as the Midnight DJ crew enters the scene, they find out that a possessed belt wants to exact revenge against its victims. How will the team be able to stop the belt as it points its fury against Chief Arthur?
121	"Ang mga Diyosa ng Kamatayan" "The Goddesses of Death"	January 8, 2011	Ghost
Las Dyosas deal vengeance to every people who come to their death place. The Mayor was once a victim of Las Dyosas but Las Dyosas didn't take him because of his blindness. Only people who can see will be taken by Las Dyosas, Las Dyosas take revenge because they're once a victim of Japanese soldiers, the soldiers took advantage of them and then killed them. Samboy takes place of ending the show, at the end as they bury the bones of Las Dyosas and pray to be peaceful. Guests: Joonee Gamboa as Kapitan Damian, Wendy Valdez as Selena (Comfort women 1), Phil Noble as Nestor, Josef Elizalde as Jeremy Gomez, Jessa Mendoza as Aimee Cristobal, Dang Amistad as comfort women 2, Justin Rosana as comfort women 3
122	"Spirit of the Glass"	January 15, 2011	Spirit/Ghost
Arthur and Andrea promise not to tell secrets anymore but Arthur lied. He didn't tell Andrea about his partner who he was marrying.
123	"Sapot ng Gagambebot!" "The Spider's Web"	January 22, 2011	Monster
What appears as a group of young, beautiful ladies turn out to be monstrous arachnids that the MDJ team must stop.
124	"Pan De Monyo" "Pandemonium"	January 29, 2011	Demon/Vengeful Spirit
Amy (Ruby Rodriguez), the baker, is in trouble. Her son, Charlie (Jacob Rica), is gravely ill and needs expensive medicine. She’s now selling her bakery because she can’t compete with the superior bread of other shops. As Amy cooks her last batch of pandesal before she finally closes her bakery, a thief enters her house. She and her sister Miranda (Eda Nolan) accidentally kill him. Looking for a way to dispose of the body, they throw it into an old stone oven to cremate it. The pandesal that emerges from the oven is the best Amy’s made so far. Eventually, Amy and Miranda learn that to make these great-tasting bread, they must feed the oven with people. As people start disappearing from the neighborhood, the Midnight DJ Team investigates. They will discover the link between disappearances and Amy’s stone oven, and the sinister history of the oven. Guests: Ramon Christopher Gutierrez as Cristobal, Ruby Rodriguez as Amy, Jacob Rica as Charlie, Eda Nolan as Miranda, Sam YG as Bumbay
125	"Buhok ng Tikbalang" "The Tikbalang's Strand"	February 5, 2011	Tikbalang
Midnight DJ team investigates the mysterious death of a student in the school last night. They found out that the Tikbalang used his hooves to stomp her to death. Guests: Makisig Morales, Kathleen Hermosa, Lester Llansang, Leandro Baldemor
126	"Ang Diablo sa Pueblo Maligno" "The Devil of Pueblo Maligno"	February 12, 2011	Demon
Samboy is attacked and kidnapped by a pair of malignos and taken to their home, Pueblo Sombra. Samboy discovers that the malignos of Pueblo Sombra are being terrorized by a demon named Molok. Samboy is tasked by Medea (Joanne Quintas), the leader of Pueblo Sombra, to go and kill the demon. What Samboy doesn’t know is that the demon has a curse, and something terrible is going to happen to Samboy if he succeeds. Guests:Joanne Quintas as Medea, Helga Krapf as Lamia, Leon Miguel as Alejandro
127	"Bangungot sa Mental" "Nightmare in the Asylum"	February 19, 2011	Spirit
Mental hospital patient Joseph doesn’t want to go to sleep. Everytime he falls asleep, he dreams and when Joseph dreams, a patient gets murdered in real life. To investigate the hospital, the Midnight DJ crew decides to send Bodjie… as a patient. but it turns out that Joseph was actually dead and his wife turned out to be Dr. Aida who murders a patient through the 7 capital sins. Guests: Sid Lucero as Joseph Lazaro, Lao Rodriguez as Abel Abraham, Gladys Reyes as Dra. Aida Lazaro, Lilia Cuntapay as an old witch
128	"Multo sa Fezbuk" "Ghost on Fezbuk"	February 26, 2011	Spirit
Four Girls are haunted by their friend who's long dead (Shane) because they didn't keep their promise. They are terrified when their names are tagged in Shane's picture in Fezbuk. Guests: Danita Paner as Shane, Arci Muñoz as Eden, Eula Caballero as Rachel, Angel Estrada as Sophie, Justin Rosana as Audrey
129	"Si Kamatayan nang ha-hunting ng Graduate" "Death's search for the Graduates"	March 5, 2011	Ghost/Spirit
Suffering from a gunshot wound, Samboy is taken by Trixie, Bodjie, and QT into a rest house in the middle of nowhere one stormy night. Graduating students Joan, Marie, and Bugoy are vacationing in the rest house. When Midnight DJ crew discover that the house is haunted by the Grim Reaper, they suspect that the spirit wants the three students because of a superstitious belief that graduating students shouldn’t travel since Death is awaiting them. Guests: Karen delos Reyes as Joan, Beauty Gonzalez as Marie, Mariel Bitanga as Hannah, Felix Roco as Bugoy
130	"Hilakbot ng Chain Letter" "The Terrible Chain Letter"	March 19, 2011	Ghost/Spirit
Fashion photographer Agnes (Diane Medina) is looking for a fresh new face to shoot for her magazine's upcoming summer edition. Agnes sees QT and immediately knows that she is the face of summer. That night, in the building that houses the magazine's studio, Agnes receives an email she interprets as a chain message. As a joke, Agnes forwards the email to his model boyfriend, a fashion designer, and (just to piss him off) Bodjie. In panic, Bodjie forwards the chain letter to Samboy and QT. Because Bodjie forwarded the chain letter to Samboy and QT, the Midnight DJ Team is now in danger from the ghost. Yet our heroes cannot forward the chain letter because that would mean putting other people in danger. They must solve the mystery and stop the murderous ghost before it kills them too. Guests: Diane Medina as Agnes Estrella, Rodjun Cruz as Kyle Marquez, April Sun as Mikaela Ramirez, Bekimon as Dylan De La Vega
131	"Atake ng Kapre" "The Kapre's Attack"	March 26, 2011	Kapre
The 10th season finale. QT invites the Midnight DJ Team to her hometown of San Valentino to celebrate their town’s fiesta. There is a rumor that a kapre has been seen in the town. Samboy and Bodjie are invited by the town’s amateur basketball league to play in a game against another town’s team. The San Valentino team is led by Bruce (Joseph Bitangcol). The cheerleading team is led by Bruce’s sister, Becky (Valeen Montenegro). During the game, one of San Valentino’s players are injured, beaten to within an inch of his life by an unknown assailant. Guests: Joseph Bitangcol as Bruce, Valeen Montenegro as Becky, Chris Gutierrez as Baldo, Mike Magat as Emman, JB de Leon as Mark, Bong Regala as Mr. Salvador, Dang Amistad as Jen

=== Season 11: April 2, 2011 - May 14, 2011 ===
No.	Title	Original release date	Paranormal occurrence
132	"Ospital" "Hospital"	April 2, 2011	Ghost/Spirit
Hospitals are believed to house the most number of ghosts because it's where a lot of people meet their end. This episode consists of various tales of horror that take place in a hospital.
133	"Condo"	April 9, 2011	Ghost/Spirit
In the first story, "Rooftop", Lisa, an only child notices her parents to be drifting apart. When a mysterious ghost shows itself to Lisa, she uncovers a horrible sin that may have had something to do with her. In the second story, "Takbo!", Jomar is pressured by his girlfriend to produce an engagement ring so they can get married. He steals a ring from a resident of the building where he works, but little did he know that it belongs to the dead.
134	"Resort"	April 16, 2011	Ghost
In the first story "Bebot", geeky best friends Marco and Teban go to a resort to look for chicks. What they don’t know is that they are on a head-on collision with the world of the dead. The second story "Resort", is about Rizza, whose boyfriend Jeff died in a traumatic way. She is taken by Joy and her boyfriend Leo to a resort so Rizza can take her mind off of Jeff’s death. What began as a relaxing vacation turns into a nightmare when Rizza gets stalked by Jeff’s ghost.
135	"Sanib" "Possession"	April 30, 2011	Demonic possession/Ghost
In the Philippines, a lot of people still believe that spirits and demons can possess the bodies of people. These two stories are examples of possession.
136	"Flores de Mayo" "Flowers of May"	May 6, 2011	Ghost/Vengeful spirit
Flores de Mayo and Santacruzan are festive and colorful celebrations of thanksgiving in the Christian faith. In these two stories, strange mysteries will not be silenced by the flowers and the festivities.
137	"Banal na Bundok" "Holy Mountain"	May 14, 2011	Ghost/Vengeful spirit
Midnight DJ series finale. A nun is haunted by an apparition, a spirit is seeking for revenge, and Samboy and Bodjie find what they're looking for.
