= Magic Palayok =

2011 Philippine television drama series

- Title card
- Also known as: Magic Pot
- Genre: Comedy drama; Fantasy
- Written by: Kit Villanueva Langit; Marites Garbes Severino; Tina Samson Velasco; Anna Alleta Nadela
- Directed by: Joel Lamangan
- Creative director: Jun Lana
- Starring: Geoff Eigenmann; Carla Abellana; Angeli Nicole Sanoy
- Theme music composer: Jobart Bartolome; Tata Betita
- Opening theme: "Magic Palayok" by La Diva
- Country of origin: Philippines
- Original language: Tagalog
- No. of episodes: 88

Production
- Executive producer: Leilani Feliciano-Sandoval
- Camera setup: Multiple-camera setup
- Running time: 18–23 minutes
- Production company: GMA Entertainment TV

Original release
- Network: GMA Network
- Release: February 28 – July 1, 2011

Magic Palayok (trans. / international title: Magic Pot) is a 2011 Philippine television drama fantasy comedy series broadcast by GMA Network. Directed by Joel Lamangan, it stars Geoff Eigenmann, Carla Abellana and Angeli Nicole Sanoy. It premiered on February 28, 2011, on the network's Telebabad line up. The series concluded on July 1, 2011, with a total of 88 episodes.

== Cast and characters ==
Cast

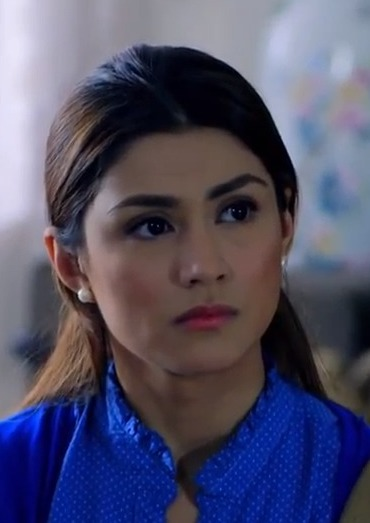
Carla Abellana

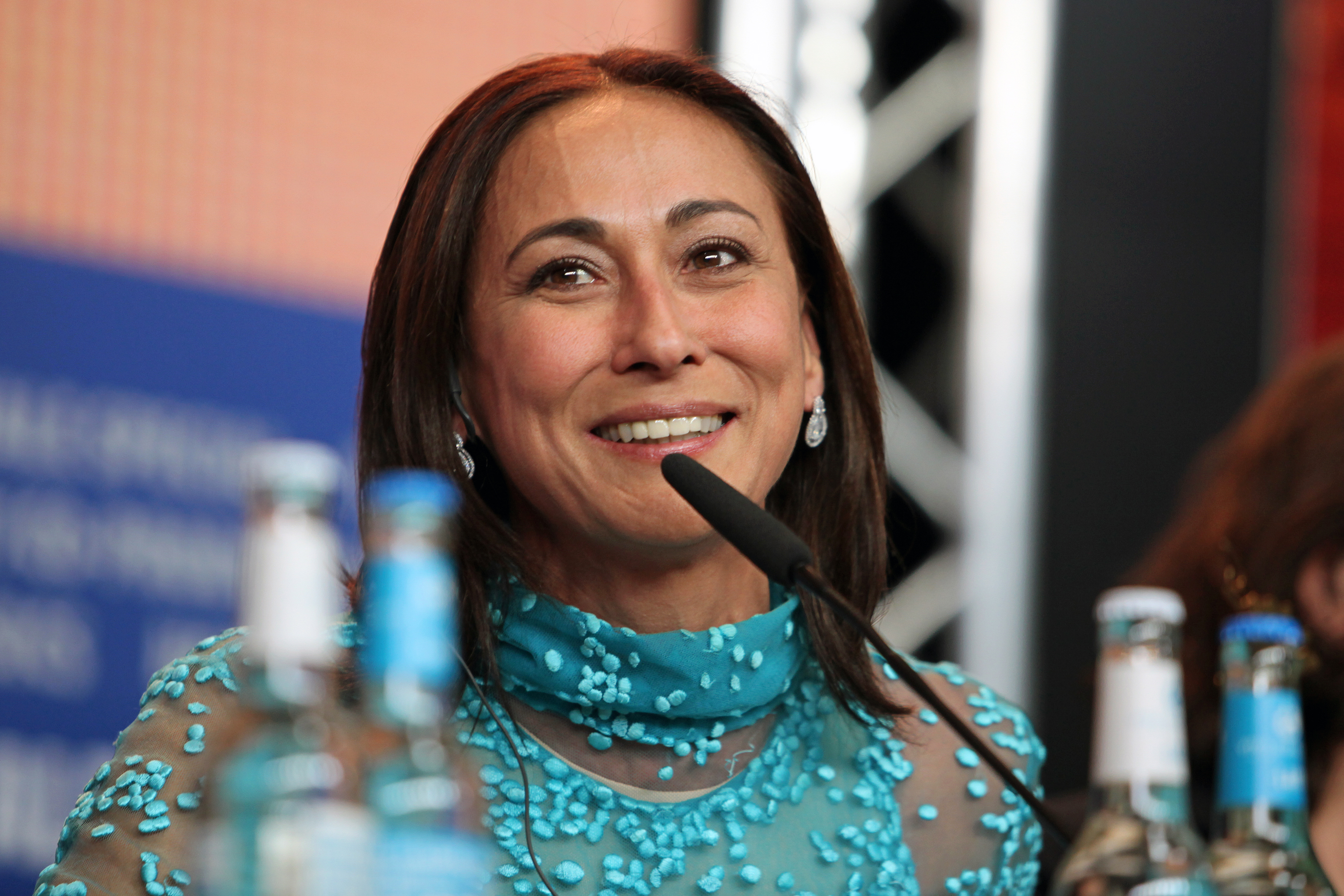
Cherie Gil

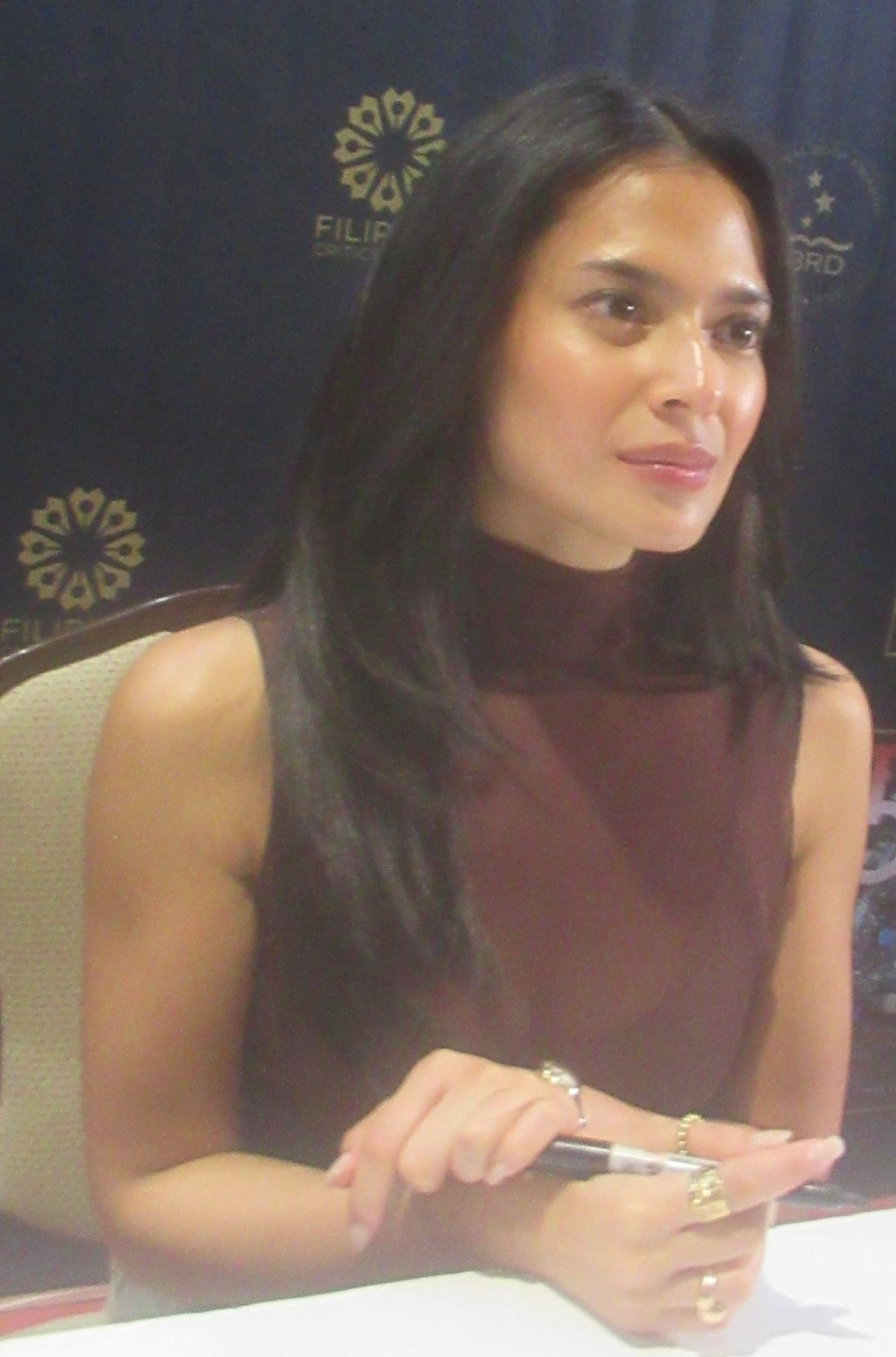
Bianca Umali

Lead cast

- Geoff Eigenmann as Richard "Jude" Cruz
- Carla Abellana as Pilar Sallave-Cruz
- Angeli Nicole Sanoy as Corazon "Cookie" De Leon

Supporting cast

- Chynna Ortaleza as Natasha Ledesma
- Cherie Gil as Yvonne Ledesma
- Manilyn Reynes as Magic Palayok
- Jay R as Nico
- Frank Garcia as Ricky
- Gino Dela Pena as Clifford
- Kyrshee Francesca Gregia as Yanyan
- Bianca Umali as Dina
- Nixon Castro as Macoy
- Francesca Salcedo as Suyen
- Lovely Rivero as Gemma Sallave
- Luigi Revilla as Kirby Sallave
- Edwin Reyes as Andong Sallave
- Vicky Ortega
- Ernie Zarate as Ipe Calevio
- Lou Sison as Noemi Santiago
- Pekto
- Maimai Davao
- Rubi Rubi as Rosa
- Moi Bien as Elma
- Cris Pasturan
- Ruby Ruiz

Guest cast

- Mikee Cojuangco as Isadora De Leon
- Tado Jimenez as Mac Enriquez
- Polo Ravales as Cardo
- Sunshine Garcia as Glenda
- Onyok Velasco
- Buboy Villar as Isko
- Vaness del Moral as Magic Sandok
- Isay Alvarez as Alicia Calevio
- Dexter Doria as Flor
- Janice de Belen as Magic Palayok
- Carme Sanchez
- Afi Africa as Manny
- Romnick Sarmenta as Richard "James" Cruz
- Pauleen Luna as Gloomera
- Carmi Martin as Alina Ledesma
- Jan Marini as Karina

== Production ==
Principal photography commenced on February 9, 2011.

== Ratings ==
According to AGB Nielsen Philippines' Mega Manila People/Individual television ratings, the pilot episode of Magic Palayok earned an 11.1% rating.
