= Behind Enemy Lines (1997 film) =

1997 film by Mark Griffiths

- Film poster
- Directed by: Mark Griffiths
- Written by: Andrew Osborne; Dennis Cooley; Andrew Osborne
- Produced by: Bradley Thomas; David Bixler; Brad Krevoy; Steven Stabler
- Starring: Thomas Ian Griffith; Chris Mulkey; Mark Carlton; Mushond Lee
- Cinematography: Blake T. Evans
- Edited by: Roderick Davis
- Music by: Arthur Kempel
- Distributed by: Orion Pictures
- Release date: May 23, 1997
- Running time: 89 minutes
- Country: United States
- Language: English

Behind Enemy Lines is a 1997 American action film directed by Mark Griffiths and starring Thomas Ian Griffith, Chris Mulkey, Mark Carlton, and Spanky Manikan. The film premiered in the United States on HBO on May 23, 1997, but it had already received a video release in some markets the year before, such as in Portugal by Prisvideo. Olive Films re-issued the film on DVD and Blu-ray on March 15, 2015.

== Plot ==
A Vietnamese military officer, General Nguy is purchasing nuclear triggers from the Chinese triads at the border. A two-man special operations US Marine Team thwarts the transaction and obtains the triggers. However, one of the Marines, Jones, is unavoidably left behind. Mike Weston thinks Jones is dead, but when he learns otherwise from Colonel Wolfe, he goes back for him. Once in Vietnam, he is picked up and General Nguy tries to get his nuclear triggers back. Weston almost escapes, but is eventually subdued and taken to prison so General Nguy can persuade Weston to tell him the location of the nuclear triggers. News of Mike’s arrest prompts Mike Weston’s sister, Katherine "Kat" Weston and several very loyal ex-Marine buddies go to Vietnam to help get him out. Weston’s sister and friends are eventually joined by an Embassy US Marine Sergeant Blakley. Eventually, Weston and Jones from inside the prison get the other prisoners to help them escape while Kat and Mike's friends stage a rescue from the outside. They finally overwhelm the prison guards. Unfortunately, Sergeant Blakley sacrifices himself to take out an armored car before it can reinforce the prison. With the nuclear triggers regained the team all make it to the rendezvous with Colonel Wolfe – except Jones. Jones is barricaded in a guard tower machine-gunning the remaining guards in a last stand. Wolfe refuses to go back for him, but Weston will have nothing of it. Jones, about to be overwhelmed, is plucked at the last second by helicopter from the guard tower. The entire team successfully escape Vietnam. In the end, Mike, Jones, the team, and their girlfriends sail off into the sunset headed to Hawaii aboard Mike's boat.

== Cast ==
- Thomas Ian Griffith as CIA Agent Mike Weston
- Chris Mulkey as CIA Agent 'Jonesy' Jones
- Mark Carlton as Colonel Wolfe
- Hillary Matthews as Katherine 'Kat' Weston
- Maury Sterling as Donny
- Mushond Lee as Luther
- Courtney Gains as Church
- Adam Gifford as Sergeant Blakely
- Mon Confiado as Phred
- Spanky Manikan as General Nguy
- Cris Daluz as Dr. Liu
- James Karen as TV Reporter
- Dale Gibson as 'Tex'
- Cris Aguilar as Cho
- Wilson Go as Police Chief
- Adriana Agcaoili as Chique
- Alex Cortez as Triad Boss
- Leon Miguel as Vietnamese Gangster Boss
- Don Carbonell as Police Sergeant
- Hazel Huelves as Boat Girl #1
- Kristine Witongco as Boat Girl #2
