= Bihag (TV series) =

2019 Philippine television drama series

- Title card
- Also known as: The Silent Thief
- Genre: Crime drama
- Created by: Suzette Doctolero
- Written by: Suzette Doctolero; Maria Zita S. Garganera; Jason John Lim; John Roque
- Directed by: Neal del Rosario
- Creative director: Aloy Adlawan
- Starring: Max Collins
- Theme music composer: Ann Margaret Figueroa
- Opening theme: "Walang Ganti" by Maricris Garcia
- Country of origin: Philippines
- Original language: Tagalog
- No. of episodes: 98 (list of episodes)

Production
- Executive producers: Darling Pulido; Kj Corpus
- Editors: Mark Anthony Valderrama; Ver Bertucio
- Camera setup: Multiple-camera setup
- Running time: 18–33 minutes
- Production company: GMA Entertainment Group

Original release
- Network: GMA Network
- Release: April 1 – August 16, 2019

Bihag (transl. captive / international title: The Silent Thief) is a 2019 Philippine television drama crime series broadcast by GMA Network. Directed by Neal del Rosario, it stars Max Collins. It premiered on April 1, 2019 on the network's Afternoon Prime line up. The series concluded on August 16, 2019, with a total of 98 episodes.

Originally titled as Ganti and later Stolen, it was later renamed to Bihag. The series is streaming online on YouTube.

== Premise ==
The lives of married couple, Jessie and Brylle will be disturbed after their son is abducted. Jessie is dissonant finding her son, because she cannot believe why someone would hurt her family.

== Cast and characters ==
Cast

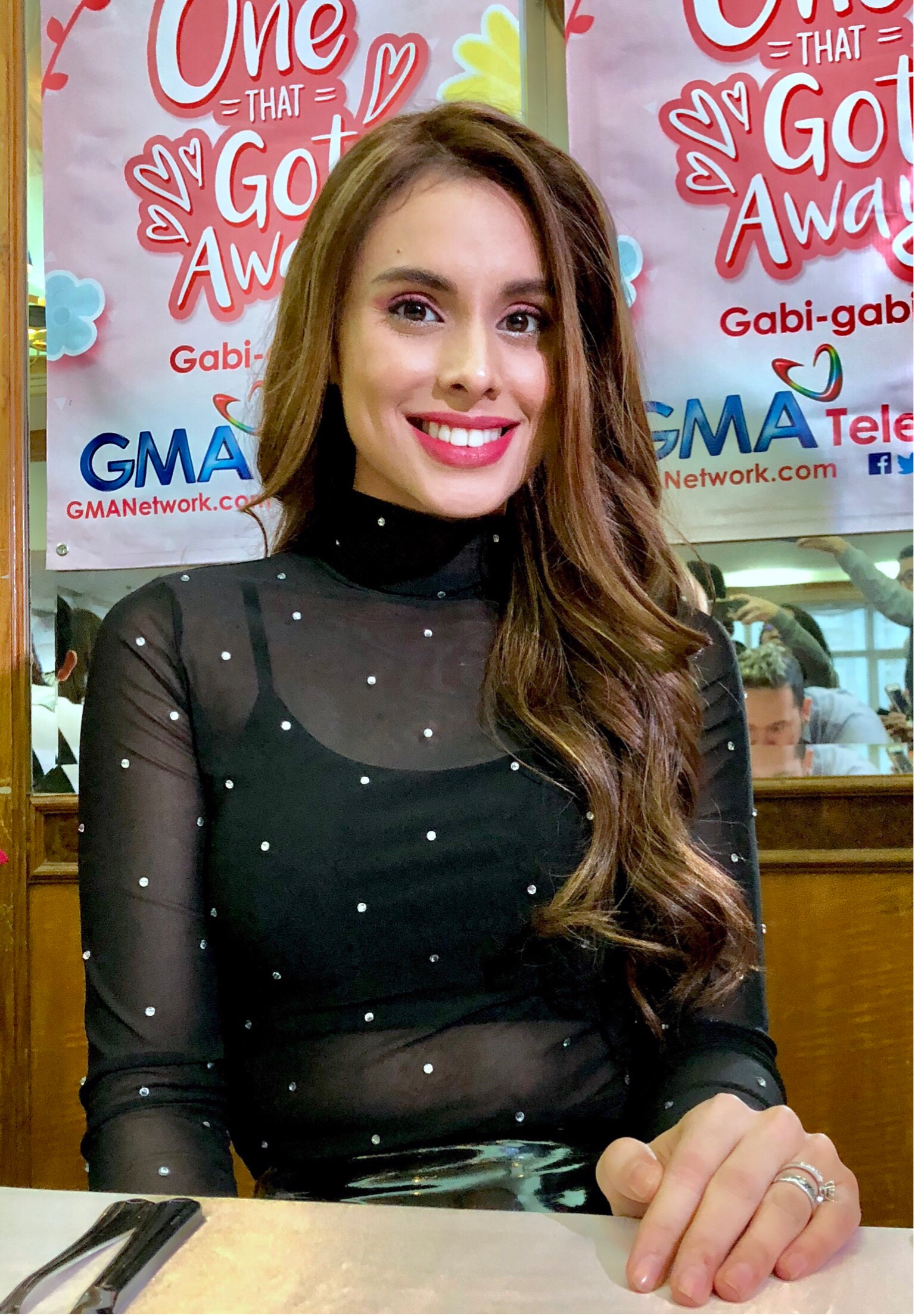
Max Collins

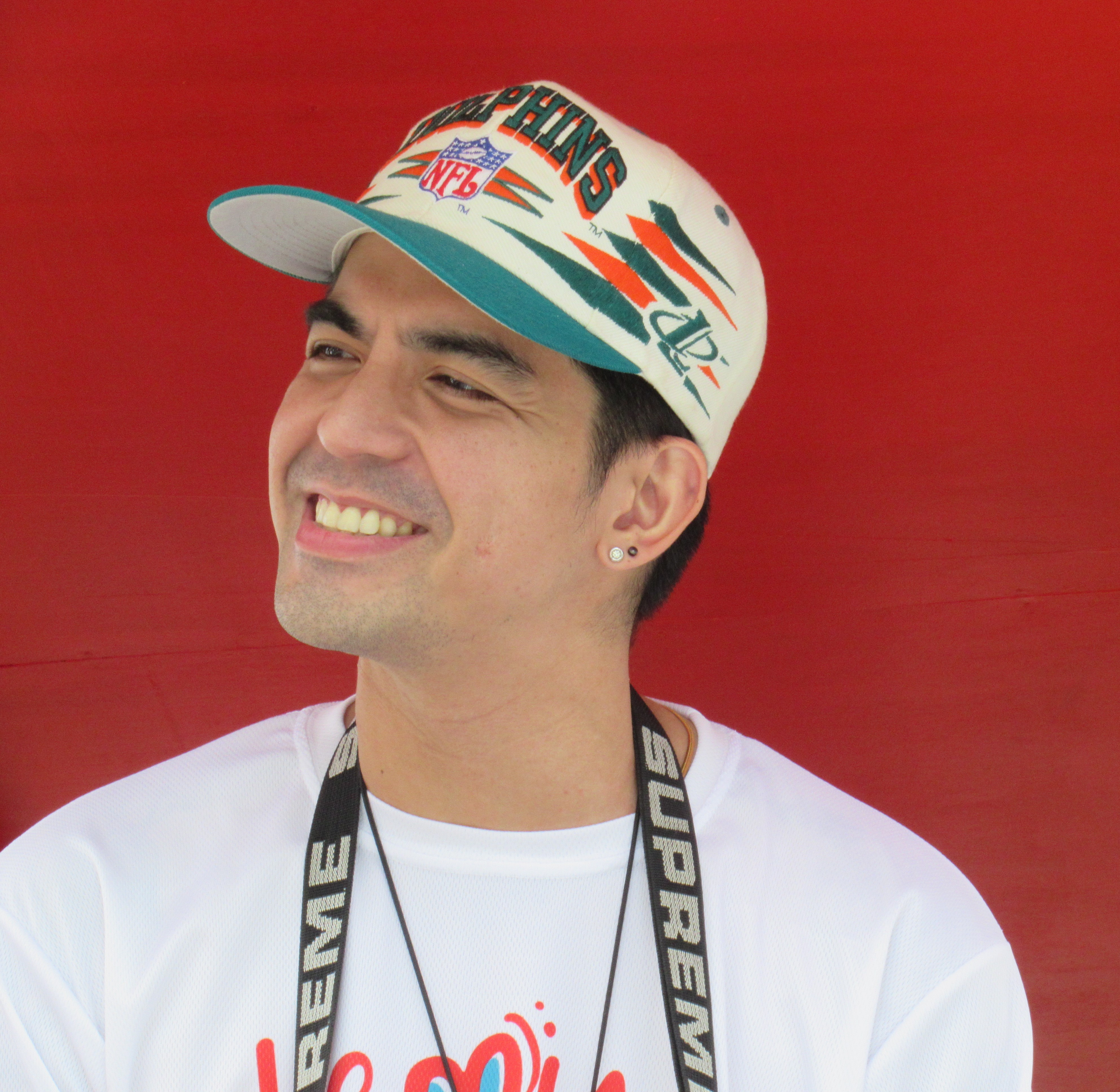
Mark Herras

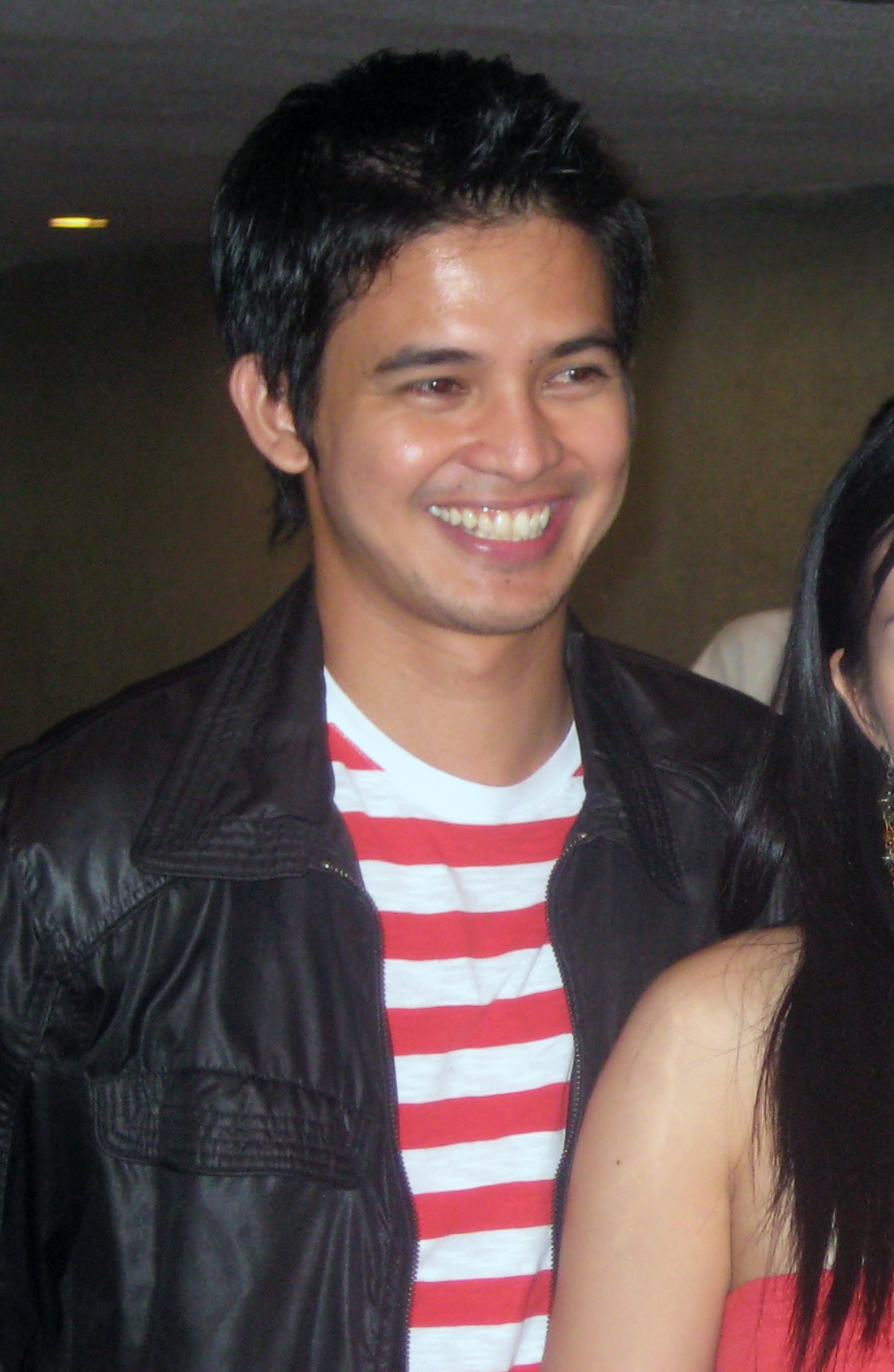
Jason Abalos

Lead cast

- Max Collins as Jessica "Jessie" Medina-Alejandro

Supporting cast

- Mark Herras as Larry Pineda
- Jason Abalos as Brylle Alejandro
- Neil Ryan Sese as Amado Anzures
- Sophie Albert as Regina Marie "Reign Marie" Sison
- Raphael Landicho as Ethan James M. Alejandro
- Glenda Garcia as Emilou Alejandro
- Nicole Kim Donesa as Martha Dampit
- Biboy Ramirez as Gino "Gene" Chavez
- Jade Lopez as Liza Chavez

Guest cast

- Celine Juan as Gigi
- Andrew Ferrer as Drew
- Joseph Izon as Reyes
- Luri Vincent Nalus as Boy
- Star Orjaliza as Marijoy
- Mike Agassi as Nico

== Casting ==
Actress Kim Domingo was initially hired for a role, and eventually backed out during pre-production due to the character's role. Actress Sophie Albert later took her role.

== Ratings ==
According to AGB Nielsen Philippines' Nationwide Urban Television Audience Measurement People in television homes, the pilot episode of Bihag earned a 5.2% rating.

== Accolades ==
Accolades received by Bihag
Year	Award	Category	Recipient	Result	Ref.
2019	33rd PMPC Star Awards for Television	Best Daytime TV Series	Bihag	Nominated	
2019	33rd PMPC Star Awards for Television	Best Drama Actress	Max Collins	Nominated	
2019	33rd PMPC Star Awards for Television	Best Child Performer	Raphael Landicho	Nominated	
