= Gangster Lolo =

2014 Filipino action film

- Directed by: William G. Mayo
- Screenplay by: Soxie Topacio
- Story by: William G. Mayo
- Produced by: Randolph I. Nonato; Rylan Flores; Marilou Monato
- Starring: Bembol Roco; Soxie Topacio; Pen Medina; Rez Cortez; Leo Martinez
- Cinematography: Edward G. Mayo
- Edited by: Edward G. Mayo
- Music by: Edward G. Mayo
- Production companies: Cosmic Raven Ventures; Philippine Motion Pictures Directors Association
- Distributed by: Cosmic Raven Ventures
- Release dates: October 25, 2014 (SM North EDSA); December 17, 2014
- Running time: 95 minutes
- Country: Philippines
- Language: Filipino

Gangster Lolo (lit. 'Gangster Grandpa') is a 2014 Filipino action comedy film directed by William G. Mayo from a script by actor Soxie Topacio. It is about five elderly ex-convicts who set out to look for hidden wealth using a map given to them by their fellow ex-convict. Produced by Cosmic Raven Ventures, the film was released on December 17, 2014.

== Cast ==
- Leo Martinez as Asiong Salonpas
- Bembol Roco
- Soxie Topacio
- Pen Medina
- Rez Cortez
- Isabel Granada
- Janice Jurado
- Richard Quan
- Boy Alano as Jack
- Archie Adamos as Jim
- Pamela Ortiz
- Vincent Dafalong
- Amay Bisaya
- Dinky Doo
- Hero Bautista
- Robert Miller
- Jess Sanches
- Rylan Flores as Bogart
- Jeric Raval
- Elyza Rivera
- Regine Mendieta
- Leon Miguel
- Stephanie Mananquil
- Ghen Gabriel
- Margaux Montano
- Allan Ortega
- Ramon Ramos
- Telly Babasa

== Release ==
Gangster Lolo premiered at The Block of SM North EDSA on October 25, 2014. Days after the film's premiere, director William Mayo suffered a mild stroke, but was able to recover after going to the Philippine Heart Center. The film was originally scheduled for nationwide release on November 19, 2014, but was delayed instead to December 17.
