= List of Bihag episodes =

Bihag (International title: The Silent Thief / transl. Captive) is a 2019 Philippine television drama series starring Max Collins, Jason Abalos, Sophie Albert, Mark Herras and Neil Ryan Sese. The series aired on GMA Network's Afternoon Prime block and worldwide via GMA Pinoy TV from April 1, 2019, to August 16, 2019, replacing My Special Tatay.

== Series overview ==
Month	Episodes	Monthly averages
Month	Episodes	NUTAM
April 2019	20	5.4%
May 2019	23	6.6%
June 2019	20	7.1%
July 2019	23	6.7%
August 2019	12	6.7%
Total	98	6.5%

== Episodes ==
=== April 2019 ===
Episode		Original air date	Social media hashtag	AGB Nielsen NUTAM People in Television Homes		ProdCode	Ref.
Episode		Original air date	Social media hashtag	Rating	Timeslot rank	ProdCode	Ref.
1	"Pilot"	April 1, 2019	#Bihag	5.2%	#2	1001 - A	
2	"Trahedya" (Tragedy)	April 2, 2019	#BihagTrahedya	5.2%	#2	1002 - B	
3	"Bihag ng Tukso" (Captive of Temptation)	April 3, 2019	#BihagNgTukso	5.4%	#2	1003 - C	
4	"Bihag ng Kasalanan" (Captive of Sin)	April 4, 2019	#BihagNgKasalanan	5.0%	#2	1004 - D	
5	"Bihag ng Galit" (Captive of Anger)	April 5, 2019	#BihagNgGalit	5.6%	#2	1005 - E	
6	"Kaibigan o Kaaway?" (Friend or Foe?)	April 8, 2019	#BihagKaibiganOKaaway	5.8%	#2	1006 - F	
7	"Bihag ng Ganti" (Captive of Revenge)	April 9, 2019	#BihagNgGanti	5.9%	#2	1007 - G	
8	"Hanapin si Ethan" (Find Ethan)	April 10, 2019	#BihagHanapinSiEthan	5.7%	#2	1008 - H	
9	"Bihag ng Takot" (Captive of Fear)	April 11, 2019	#BihagNgTakot	5.0%	#2	1009 - I	
10	"Pagbabanta" (Threatening)	April 12, 2019	#BihagPagbabanta	5.6%	#2	1010 - J	
11	"Mastermind"	April 15, 2019	#BihagMastermind	4.8%	#2	1012 - L	
12	"Bagong Suspect" (New Suspect)	April 16, 2019	#BihagBagongSuspect	5.3%	#2	1011 - K	
13	"Deny to Death"	April 17, 2019	#BihagDenyToDeath	6.0%	#2	1015 - O	
14	"Sabwatan" (Conspiracy)	April 22, 2019	#BihagSabwatan	5.2%	#2	1013 - M	
15	"Pagluluksa" (Mourn)	April 23, 2019	#BihagPagluluksa	5.8%	#2	1014 - N	
16	"Pagluluksa" (Mourn)	April 24, 2019	#BihagPagluluksa	5.6%	#2	1016 - P	
17	"Bihag ng Pagluluksa" (Captive of Mourning)	April 25, 2019	#BihagNgPagluluksa	5.3%	#2	1017 - Q	
18	"Paghahanap" (Searching)	April 26, 2019	#BihagPaghahanap	5.0%	#2	1018 - R	
19	"Jessie Hanap Ebidensya" (Jessie Finds Evidence)	April 29, 2019	#BihagJessieHanapEbidensya	5.0%	#2	1019 - S	
20	"Reign's Manipulation"	April 30, 2019	#BihagReignsManipulation	6.1%	#2	1020 - T	

=== May 2019 ===
Episode		Original air date	Social media hashtag	AGB Nielsen NUTAM;People in Television Homes		ProdCode	Ref.
Episode		Original air date	Social media hashtag	Rating	Timeslot rank	ProdCode	Ref.
21	"Pagdududa ni Jessie" (Jessie's Doubt)	May 1, 2019	#BihagPagdududaNiJessie	6.1%	#2	1021 - U	
22	"Muling Pagtataksil" (Another Betrayal)	May 2, 2019	#BihagMulingPagtatksil	6.0%	#2	1022 - V	
23	"Ahas Ka, Reign!" (You're a Snake, Reign!)	May 3, 2019	#BihagAhasKaReign	6.4%	#2	1023 - W	
24	"Video Scandal"	May 6, 2019	#BihagVideoScandal	5.7%	#2	1024 - X	
25	"Ang Kabit ni Brylle" (Brylle's Mistress)	May 7, 2019	#BihagAngKabitNiBrylle	5.4%	#2	1025 - Y	
26	"Hanapin si Reign" (Find Reign)	May 8, 2019	#BihagHanapinSiReign	6.1%	#2	1028 - BB	
27	"Buking" (Caught)	May 9, 2019	#BihagBuking	6.3%	#2	1026 - Z	
28	"Sugod, Jessie" (Go, Jessie!)	May 10, 2019	#BihagSugodJessie	5.7%	#2	1029 - CC	
29	"Willing Mistress"	May 13, 2019	#BihagWillingMistress			1030 - DD	
30	"Bistado Ka Na!" (You're Busted!)	May 14, 2019	#BihagBistadoKaNa	6.6%	#2	1031 - EE	
31	"Best Fake Friend"	May 15, 2019	#BihagBestFakeFriend	6.8%	#2	1027 - AA	
32	"Birthday Surprise"	May 16, 2019	#BihagBirthdaySurprise	6.7%	#2	1032 - FF	
33	"Ganti ng Asawa" (Wife's Revenge)	May 17, 2019	#BihagGantiNgAsawa	7.1%	#2	1033 - GG	
34	"Babaeng Hudas" (Judas Woman)	May 20, 2019	#BihagBabaengHudas	7.5%	#2	1034 - HH	
35	"Suka Para sa Kati" (Vinegar for Irritation)	May 21, 2019	#BihagSukaParaSaKati	6.9%	#2	1035 - II	
36	"Hindi Magpapatalo" (Not going to be Defeated)	May 22, 2019	#BihagHindiMagpapatalo	8.0%	#2	1036 - JJ	
37	"Asawa vs. Biyenan" (Wife vs. Mother-in-Law)	May 23, 2019	#BihagAsawaVsBiyenan	6.8%	#2	1037 - KK	
38	"Totoong Hudas" (The Real Judas)	May 24, 2019	#BihagTotoongHudas	6.7%	#2	1038 - LL	
39	"Sino Pumatay?" (Who Killed?)	May 27, 2019	#BihagSinoPumatay	7.1%	#2	1040 - NN	
40	"Liars go to Hell"	May 28, 2019	#BihagLiarsGoToHell	6.6%	#2	1039 - MM	
41	"Justice for Jessie"	May 29, 2019	#BihagJusticeForJessie	6.6%	#2	1041 - OO	
42	"Eskapo" (Escape)	May 30, 2019	#BihagEskapo	7.3%	#2	1042 - PP	
43	"Hindi Susuko" (Not Giving Up)	May 31, 2019	#BihagHindiSusuko	7.1%	#2	1043 - QQ	

=== June 2019 ===
Episode		Original air date	Social media hashtag	AGB Nielsen NUTAM People in Television Homes		ProdCode	Ref.
Episode		Original air date	Social media hashtag	Rating	Timeslot rank	ProdCode	Ref.
44	"Bangon, Jessie" (Rise, Jessie)	June 3, 2019	#BihagBangonJessie	7.3%	#2	1044 - RR	
45	"Witness"	June 4, 2019	#BihagWitness	6.9%	#2	1045 - SS	
46	"Katotohanan" (Truth)	June 5, 2019	#BihagKatotohanan	7.0%	#2	1046 - TT	
47	"Inosente" (Innocent)	June 6, 2019	#BihagInosente	6.1%	#2	1047 - UU	
48	"Desperadang Kabit Bahay" (Desperate House Mistress)	June 7, 2019	#BihagDesperadangKabitBahay	7.6%	#2	1048 - VV	
49	"Sunog Kama" (Bed Fire)	June 10, 2019	#BihagSunogKama	7.4%	#2	1051 - YY	
50	"Reign No Shame"	June 11, 2019	#BihagReignNoShame	7.7%	#2	1049 - WW	
51	"Reign Go Away"	June 12, 2019	#BihagReignGoAway	7.4%	#2	1050 - XX	
52	"Buhay si Ethan" (Ethan is Alive)	June 13, 2019	#BihagBuhaySiEthan	6.1%	#2	1052 - ZZ	
53	"Hanapin si Ethan" (Find Ethan)	June 14, 2019	#BihagHanapinSiEthan	5.9%	#2	1053 - AAA	
54	"Habulan" (Chase)	June 17, 2019	#BihagHabulan	7.3%	#2	1054 - BBB	
55	"Reign's Birthday Surprise"	June 18, 2019	#BihagReignBirthdaySurprise	7.0%	#2	1055 - CCC	
56	"Traydor" (Traitor)	June 19, 2019	#BihagTraydor	7.1%	#2	1056 - DDD	
57	"Takas" (Escape)	June 20, 2019	#BihagTakas	7.2%	#2	1057 - EEE	
58	"Kumpirmasyon" (Confirmation)	June 21, 2019	#BihagKumpirmasyon	7.7%	#2	1059 - GGG	
59	"Bihag ng Selos" (Captive of Envy)	June 24, 2019	#BihagNgSelos	7.1%	#2	1058 - FFF	
60	"Bad ka, Reign!" (You're bad, Reign)	June 25, 2019	#BihagBadKaReign	7.5%	#2	1060 - HHH	
61	"Bida-Bida" (Playing Hero)	June 26, 2019	#BihagBidaBida	7.0%	#2	1061 - III	
62	"Lagot Ka" (You're in Trouble)	June 27, 2019	#BihagLagotKa	6.9%	#2	1062 - JJJ	
63	"Santa Santita" (Unholy Saint)	June 28, 2019	#BihagSantaSantita	7.1%	#2	1063 - KKK	

=== July 2019 ===
Episode		Original air date	Social media hashtag	AGB Nielsen NUTAM People in Television Homes		ProdCode	Ref.
Episode		Original air date	Social media hashtag	Rating	Timeslot rank	ProdCode	Ref.
64	"Sundan si Reign" (Follow Reign)	July 1, 2019	#BihagSundanSiReign	7.5%	#2	1064 - LLL	
65	"Buti Nga Sa'yo" (Good For You)	July 2, 2019	#BihagButiNgaSaYo	7.4%	#2	1065 - MMM	
66	"Sabwatan" (Conspiracy)	July 3, 2019	#BihagSabwatan	6.3%	#2	1066 - NNN	
67	"Huli Ka" (You're Caught)	July 4, 2019	#BihagHuliKa	6.7%	#2	1067 - OOO	
68	"Pag-amin" (Confession)	July 5, 2019	#BihagPagAmin	5.6%	#2	1069 - QQQ	
69	"New Homeowner"	July 8, 2019	#BihagNewHomeowner	6.4%	#2	1070 - RRR	
70	"Reign Epal" (Reign the Jerk)	July 9, 2019	#BihagReignEpal	6.7%	#2	1071 - SSS	
71	"Feelingera"	July 10, 2019	#BihagFeelingera	6.3%	#2	1072 - TTT	
72	"Walang Bawian" (No Redempting)	July 11, 2019	#BihagWalangBawian	6.9%	#2	1068 - PPP	
73	"Lagot Ka, Amado" (You're in Trouble, Amado)	July 12, 2019	#BihagLagotKaAmado	6.5%	#2	1073 - UUU	
74	"Mommy Ko" (My Mommy)	July 15, 2019	#BihagMommyKo	6.7%	#2	1074 - VVV	
75	"Pagkikita" (Meeting)	July 16, 2019	#BihagPagkikita	7.5%	#2	1075 - WWW	
76	"Salisi" (Caught)	July 17, 2019	#BihagSalisi	7.6%	#2	1076 - XXX	
77	"Love Affair"	July 18, 2019	#BihagLoveAffair	7.0%	#2	1077 - YYY	
78	"Adultery"	July 19, 2019	#BihagAdultery	7.1%	#2	1078 - ZZZ	
79	"Legal Separation"	July 22, 2019	#BihagLegalSeparation	5.9%	#2	1079 - a	
80	"Umamin Ka Na" (Admit It)	July 23, 2019	#BihagUmaminKaNa	6.0%	#2	1081 - c	
81	"Ransom"	July 24, 2019	#BihagRansom	6.2%	#2	1082 - d	
82	"Pangamba" (Fear)	July 25, 2019	#BihagPangamba	7.1%	#2	1080 - b	
83	"Pinagtagpo" (Encounter)	July 26, 2019	#BihagPinagtagpo	6.8%	#2	1083 - e	
84	"Jessie-Ethan Reunion"	July 29, 2019	#BihagJessieEthanReunion	6.7%	#2	1084 - f	
85	"Happy Day"	July 30, 2019	#BihagHappyDay	6.4%	#2	1085 - g	
86	"Bruha ka, Reign!" (You're a Witch, Reign!)	July 31, 2019	#BihagBruhaKaReign	6.4%	#2	1086 - h	

=== August 2019 ===
Episode		Original air date	Social media hashtag	AGB Nielsen NUTAM People in Television Homes		ProdCode	Ref.
Episode		Original air date	Social media hashtag	Rating	Timeslot rank	ProdCode	Ref.
87	"Rebelasyon" (Revelation)	August 1, 2019	#BihagRebelasyon	7.2%	#2	1087 - i	
88	"Family Reunion"	August 2, 2019	#BihagFamilyReunion	6.4%	#2	1088 - j	
89	"Paglaya" (Freed)	August 5, 2019	#BihagPaglaya	6.4%	#2	1090 - l	
90	"Your Reign is Over"	August 6, 2019	#BihagYourReignIsOver	6.3%	#2	1091 - m	
91	"Gigil Much" (Annoyed Much)	August 7, 2019	#BihagGigilMuch	7.5%	#2	1092 - n	
92	"Agaw Buhay" (Dying)	August 8, 2019	#BihagAgawBuhay	7.1%	#2	1089 - k	
93	"Payback"	August 9, 2019	#BihagPayback	7.0%	#2	1093 - o	
94	"Guilty"	August 12, 2019	#BihagGulity	6.8%	#2	1094 - p	
95	"Evil Reign"	August 13, 2019	#BihagEvilReign	6.1%	#2	1095 - q	
96	"Pamilya Alejandro" (Alejandro Family)	August 14, 2019	#BihagPamilyaAlejandro	6.7%	#2	1096 - r	
97	"Katapusan Mo Na" (Your End)	August 15, 2019	#BihagKatapusanMoNa	6.2%	#2	1097 - s	
98	"Huling Ganti" (Final Revenge)	August 16, 2019	#BihagHulingGanti	7.2%	#2	1098 - t	
