= January Isaac =

Filipino actress

- Born: February 18, 1976 (age 50); Philippines
- Other names: Lumen; Sandra Gomez
- Occupation: Actress
- Years active: 1997–2013
- Spouse: Wade Bodlovic (m. 2010)
- Children: 2

January Isaac-Bodlovic (born February 18, 1976) is a Filipino-American actress.

== Career ==
Isaac, previously credited as Sandra Gomez, was one of the talents introduced by ABS-CBN's Talent Center, now Star Magic, in 1998.

She played the titular character of Surf's "Lumen—Wais na Misis" series of advertisements, which ran from 1998 to 2015.

Isaac previously fronted the short-lived acoustic band January Summer.

== Personal life ==
Isaac is married to Wade Bodlovic, together they have two children Hunter and Harley Jade.

Isaac is a practical shooter and a black belt in taekwondo and aikido.

== Filmography ==
=== Television ===
Year	Title	Role	Notes	Source
1999	Sa Sandaling Kailangan Mo Ako	Irene	Book 2	
1999	Marinella	Lory		
2005	Ang Mahiwagang Baul		Episode: "Ang Alamat ng Kawayan"	
2006	Captain Barbell	Kristiana/Admiral K		
2008	Daisy Siete: Prince Charming and The Seven Maids			
2008	Gagambino	Samara		
2008	Your Song Presents: Someone Like You			
2008	Midnight DJ		Guest, 1 episode	

=== Film ===
Year	Title	Role	Notes	Source
1998	Techno Warriors		Credited as "Sandra Gomez"	
2000	Minsan Minahal Kita	Trina		
2000	Burador			
2000	Doomsdayer	Dyna Castenada		
2003	Ngayong Nandito Ka	Tessa		
2003	Pakners	Vivian Suarez		
2004	Enteng Kabisote: Okay ka, Fairy Ko: The Legend	Malikmata		
2006	Blue Moon	Vivian		
2006	Saan Nagtatago si Happiness?	Martha		
2007	You Got Me!	Young Mom of Amor Santander		
