= Angeli Nicole Sanoy =

Filipino actress

Angellie Sanoy
- Born: Angellie Nicholle Sanoy
- Occupation: Actress
- Years active: 2009–2016; 2019–present
- Agent: GMA Artist Center (2009–2014)

Angellie Sanoy is a Filipino child actress.

She rose to stardom after playing the role of Narda (young Darna) in the 2009 TV series Darna along with Marian Rivera and Regine Velasquez. In 2011, she played her very first lead role in the TV series Magic Palayok as Corazon "Cookie" De Leon along with Carla Abellana and Geoff Eigenmann. She won Best Actress for “Bomba” at the 33rd Warsaw International Film Festival in Poland.

== Filmography ==
=== Television ===
- Midnight DJ: Killer Teddy Bear (2009) - Nicole
- Darna (2009) – young Narda
- Midnight DJ: Buhay na Wheel Chair (2010) - Daisa
- The Last Prince (2010) - Bambi
- Midnight DJ: Bulong ng Demonyo (2010) - Eleanor
- Grazilda (2010–2011) - Jik-jik
- Magic Palayok (2011) – Corazon "Cookie" de Leon
- The Good Daughter (2012) – Julia Alejandro Guevarra
- Love You Stranger (2022) – Bunny
- Pulang Araw (2024) – Lorena
- Apoy sa Dugo (2026) – Katkat
- Delivery Boi (2026–present) – Krystal Maniego

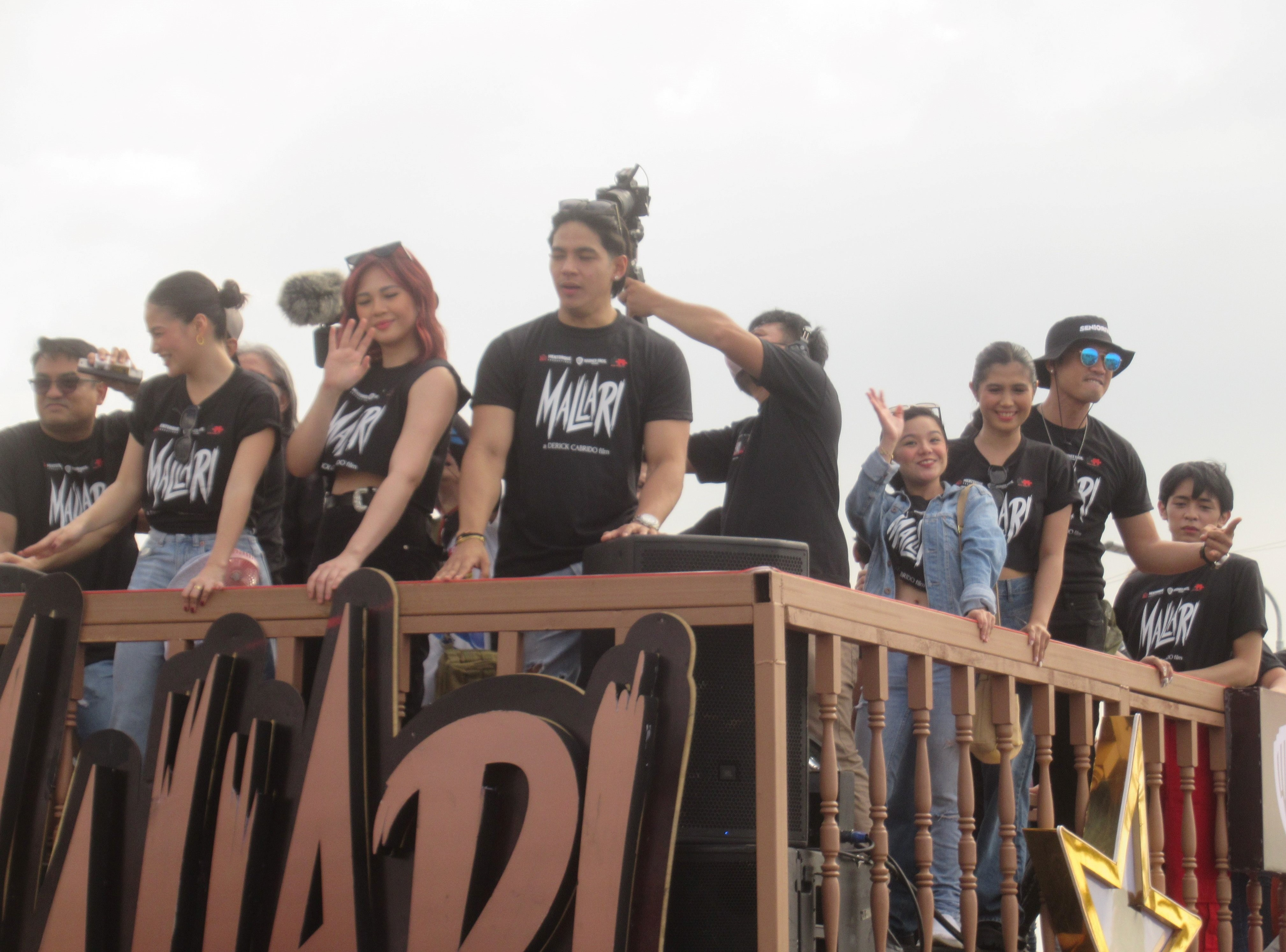
Sanoy in Mallari (film)

=== Movies ===
- Dalaw (2010) – Belle
- Patikul (2011)
- Guni-Guni (2012) – Hazel
- Homeless (2015)
- The Bomb (2017)
- Excuse Me Po (2018)
- Ang Babaeng Allergic sa WiFi (2018) – Laurie
- Mystery of the Night (2019)
- Black Lipstick (2019)
- Write About Love (2019) – Wendy
- Wild Little Love (2019) – Emily
- Lockdown (2021) – Jenny
- Ngayon Kaya (2022) – Rairai
- Mallari (2023) – Amal
- Sisa (2026) – Nena
