= Jade Lopez =

Filipino actress (born 1987)

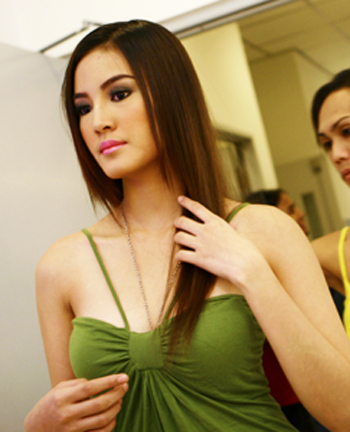
- Born: Jade Hanzel Dimapilis Lopez; October 22, 1987 (age 38); Tanauan, Batangas, Philippines
- Education: San Beda College
- Occupations: Actress, model
- Years active: 2003–present
- Agent: Sparkle GMA Artist Center
- Spouse: Rocky Siccion (m. 2018)
- Children: 2

Jade Hanzel Dimapilis Lopez-Siccion (born October 22, 1987) is a Filipino actress and businesswoman. A former Seventeen Best Female Model, she entered Philippine showbiz through the first wave of StarStruck and became a finalist.

== Personal life ==
In 2018, Lopez married her non-showbiz fiancé, Rocky Siccion at Manila Cathedral. She gave birth to a daughter, Rinoa Sapphire, on February 26, 2020. On September 13, 2021, GMA News announced that Lopez is pregnant with another child.

== Filmography ==
=== Film ===
Year	Title	Role	Note(s)	Ref(s).
2004	Forever My Love	Abby		
2005	Happily Ever After			
2005	Hari ng Sablay: Isang Tama, Sampung Mali	Maggie		
2006	Ina, Anak, Pamilya			
2009	The 12th of June	Eloisa		
2013	The Fighting Chefs			
2016	Die Beautiful	Diana		
2018	To Love Some Buddy	Mercy		
2019	Iska	Alabang social worker		

=== Television ===
Year	Title	Role	Note(s)	Ref(s).
2003	StarStruck	Herself (contestant)		
2004	Stage 1: The StarStruck Playhouse	Herself		
2004–2005	Forever in My Heart	Lily		
2004–2006	SOP/SOP Gigsters	Herself (performer)		
2005	Maynila	Various roles		
2005–2006	Fans Kita	Herself		
2005–2006	Ganda ng Lola Ko	Herself		
2006	Majika	Amyla		
2007	Princess Charming	Aleli Santos		
2008	Midnight DJ: Hole in the Wall	Misty		
2008	Sine Novela: Kaputol ng Isang Awit	Daniella		
2008	Ako si Kim Samsoon	Vicky Mara		
2008–2009	Luna Mystika	Susing		
2009	All My Life	Lindsay		
2009	SRO Cinemaserye: Reunion	Asheewari		
2010	Midnight DJ: Bagsik ng Bulalakaw	Sally		
2010	Midnight DJ: Monster Bag	Lucy		
2010	Midnight DJ: Inday ng Ondoy	Yaya Inday		
2010	Untold Stories Mula sa Face to Face	Herself		
2010	Midnight DJ: Baklitang Manananggal	Isay		
2011	Captain Barbell: Ang Pagbabalik	Irma		
2012	Luna Blanca Book 3	Roma		
2013	My Husband's Lover	Bek-bek		
2014	Rhodora X	Bianca		
2015	Karelasyon	N/A		
2015	My Faithful Husband	Doyee		
2016	The Millionaire's Wife	Carla		
2016	Magpakailanman: #LoloKongProsti	Elma		
2016	Usapang Real Love	Lily Anne Manalo		
2016	Alyas Robin Hood	Ariana Granade		
2017	Wish Ko Lang: Sa Kuweba ng Buhay	Elsi		
2017	Super Ma'am	Vicky Cortez		
2017	Impostora	Danica Santillan		
2018	Kapag Nahati ang Puso	Kat		
2018	Inday Will Always Love You	Wet market vendor		
2019	Bihag	Liza Chavez		
2019	Tadhana	various roles		
2020	Dear Uge	various roles		
2025	Mommy Dearest	Maristela		
2026	Born to Shine	Anya Bravo		
