= Leon Miguel =

Filipino actor and model (born 1968)

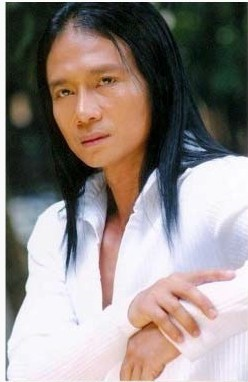
- Leon Miguel in 2015
- Born: Noel I. Aparilla; December 17, 1968 (age 57); Masbate, Philippines
- Citizenship: Filipino
- Occupations: Actor, model, engineer
- Years active: 1996–present

Noel I. Aparilla (born 17 December, 1968), known professionally as Leon Miguel, is a Filipino actor, model, and engineer. He won Best Actor (Short) at the Festival Manhattan (IFFM) in 2016 for his performance in the short film Redlights.

Earlier in his career, Miguel portrayed Visel, the primary antagonist in the crime thriller Graceland: A Life for Every Lie (2012), directed by Ron Morales. The film premiered at the Tribeca Film Festival where it was second place in the Audience Choice Award competition, and later won the Audience Award at the Gasparilla Film Festival in Tampa, Florida.

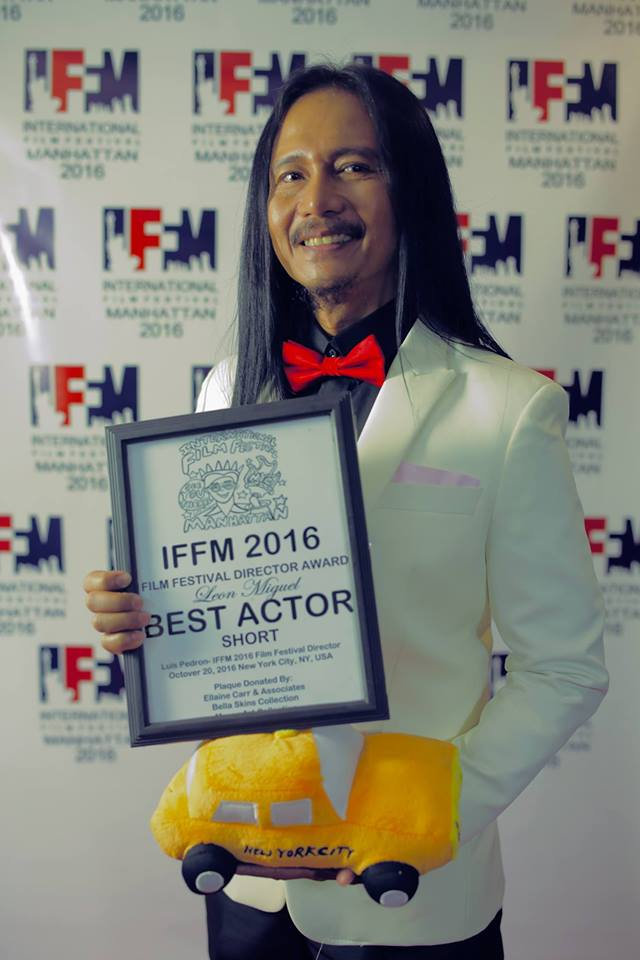
Leon Miguel, IFFM 2016 Best Actor (Short)

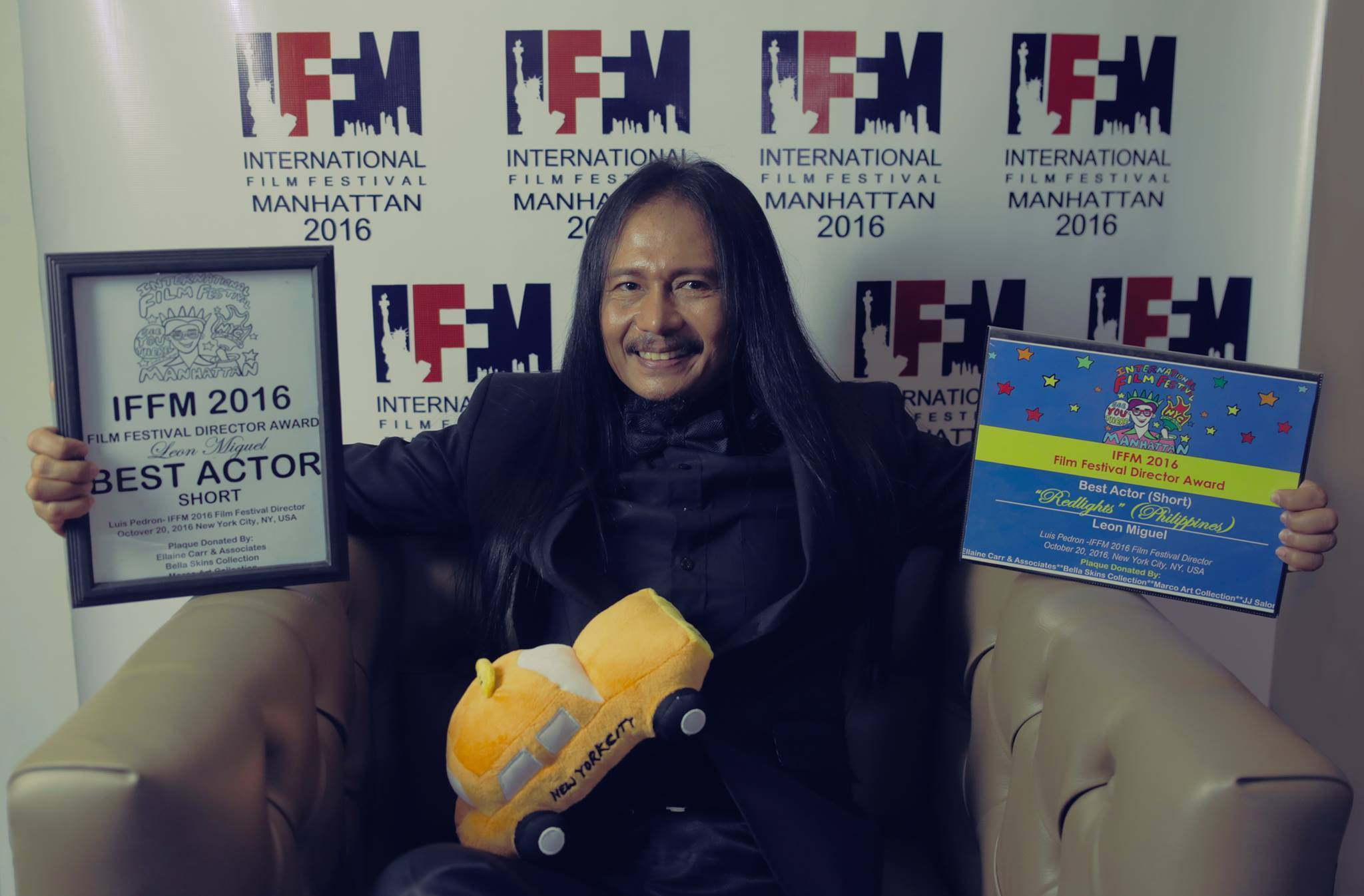
Leon Miguel IFFM 2016 Best Actor (Short)

Miguel was recognised for his role in Mang Abe's Ube, directed by Paolo Bitanga, a modern-day folktale about a Filipino ube farmer protecting his magical crop from corporate exploitation. His work includes EJK (Extra-Judicial Killing), a political drama produced by Red Carpet Philippines, which premiered at Greenbelt 1, Cinema 2, Ayala Center, Makati.

== Early career ==
Leon Miguel first gained international exposure through supporting roles in American, Japanese, and Italian movies shot on location in the Philippines. He appeared in minor roles in films such as In the Name of the Queen (1996), Behind Enemy Lines (1998), and Legacy (1998).

== Notable roles ==
Leon Miguel has appeared in various notable Filipino films, taking on roles such as Kanto boy (Street Toughie), siga (Toughie), syndicate member, school worker, youngster’s hoodlum, snatcher, hitman, rapist, banker (boatman), Katipunero (rebel), and Hukbalahap (rebel).

Miguel portrayed the guerilla Juan in Concerto (2008), a Cinemalaya finalist directed by Paul Alexander Morales. In Sean Lim's films, Panahon Na (2009) and Pendong (2010), he played a Lobo and a farmer. He appeared as a gangster in Third World Happy (2010) with Sam Milby as the lead actor, of CinemaOne/Brass Knuckles Inc., directed by Edward James Salcedo. Miguel also played a rebel in a CinemaOne Originals film Tsardyer (2010), directed by Sigfried Barros-Sanchez. Additionally, he took on the role of Baloy in Isda (Fable of the Fish), a 2011 Cinemalaya entry directed by Adolfo Alix Jr. He again appeared in a film directed with Alix in July 2012, portraying a guerrilla in Death March.

== Television commercials ==
Leon Miguel was in several television commercials as a Katipunero in KKK (Andres Bonifacio) (1998), and Isang Bandila (Emilio Aguinaldo) (1998) for the Philippine Centennial Celebration. He was the lead actor Katipunero in the Duty-Free Centennial Presentation (2010) directed by Raymond Red. He also appeared in San Miguel Beer (2004), SMB Vietnam Setting commercial, Metro Bank (2004), Blend 45 (2005), SMB Walang Kupas (2005), Oracle (2006) and Touch Mobile (2008). He also portrayed a Chavacano fisherman in an intrusion project of GMA Channel 7 and Globe Company, in the music video "Believe" which was used as a Station ID for the Peace and Unity information-dissemination drive.

He was also featured in a Talk & Text (Hati) (2010) commercial, Snitch Choco Bar (Rockers Dream) (2010), Head & Shoulders (2010), Project Building Medicine TVC (2010), and Ayos Dito Rocker TVC.

== Filmography ==
=== Film ===
Year	Title	Role
2017	Stateside	Kevin
2016	Fall Guy	Leon
2016	The Call of Our Forefathers	Sultan Kudarat
2016	Hangyo	Brando
2016	Katok ng Pagbabago	Drug dealer
2016	Haplos	Blind father
2016	Snake Eyes	Blind gambler
2016	Galit Na Aso	Homeless man
2015	Empasee	Bar owner
2015	Hawi	Boxer trainer
2015	Stranger Danger	The torturer
2015	Isla	Sindicate leader
2015	Redlights	Taxi Driver
2015	Fourth World	Trafficker
2015	Kid Kulafu	CHDF soldier
2015	Quira	Chief Euba
2014	Gangster Lolo	
2014	Maratabat	Fredo, the traitor
2013	El Peste Romansa	Ron, the rockstar
2013	Metro Manila	The white-eyed man
2013	Sabine	Manuelo
2012	Palitan	Leon
2012	Pantalan	Repair man
2012	GraceLand: A Life for Every Lie	Visel
2012	Paglaya sa Tanikala	Leon
2012	Captive	Abu Sayyaf
2011	Mami	Beggar
2011	Isda (Fable of the Fish)	Baloy
2011	Ang Panday 2	Taumbayan
2010	Third World Happy	Gangster
2010	Pendong	Farmer
2010	Emergency Call	Outlaw
2010	Regalo	Ron, Child Trafficker
2010	Tsardyer	Rebel
2010	Tulak (Short Film)	Second Lead
2010	Idlip	Tamaw
2009	Harang (Short Film)	Carjacker
2009	Panahon Na	Lobo
2008	Infected Island	The Islander Guy
2008	Subject: I Love You	Abu Sayaff, Man #1
2008	Disarmed/Special Ops	Tomagan
2008	Pedro (Short Film)	Pedro
2008	Concert	Juan
2005	Paraiso	Gangster
2004	The Passion of Love	Warrior Prince
2003	Land of Death	Native tribesman leader
2003	Operasyon Balikatan	NPA Leader
2002	Lapu-Lapu	Lapu-Lapu's man
2002	Bakat	Gasoline Boy
2002	Utang ni Tatang	Siga
2002	Lord of Creations/Midnight Festival	Tribesman
2002	Shattered Dreams	Thai Drug Pusher
2001	Bala Ko ang Bahala Sayo	Unknown
2001	Rosario 18	Kanto Boy
2000	Nag-aapoy Na Laman	Chupon
2000	Going Back	Vietnamese Thief
1998	Legacy	Cambodian Rebel Leader
1997	Behind Enemy Lines	Vietnamese Gangster Leader
1997	Kamada	Unknown
1996	Mulanay sa Pusod ng Paraiso	Unknown

Commercials

Year	Title	Role
2014	Dynamic Trio Voltplex KQ, Reload Plus & Respigen 15	Cock Fighter
2014	Ayos Dito	Rockstar
2014	Amtyl 500	Farm Owner
2014	BDO	DJ, Music Store Owner
2013	EQ Diaper	Lapu-Lapu, Lead Actor
2010	Project Building Medicine TVC - Saridon	Carpenter
2010	Head And Shoulders	Business man
2010	Snicth Choco Bar	Rockers Dream
2010	Talk And Text(Hati)	Store Owner
2008	Believe	Abu Sayaff
2006	Oracle	Hacker
2005	Blend 45	Farmer
2004	San Miguel Beer	Farmer
2004	Metro Bank	Businessman
1998	Isand Bandila (Philippine Centennial Celebration)	Katipunero
1998	KKK	Katipunero

Television

Year	Title	Role
2012	Broken Vow	Artemio
2011	Amaya	Balong
2011	Pueblo Sombra	Fisherman
2010	Panday Kids	Shaman
2010	Pidol’s Wonderland	Hector
2010	Midnight DJ's Barangay Aswang	Cameraman
2010	Midnight DJ's Halimaw sa Tuod	Unknown
2010	Nag-Simula sa Puso	Ben
2010	Daisy Syete – Bebe & Me	Roman
2010	Midnight DJ's Hoy!Hoy! Syokoy	Fisherman
2009	Tinderella	Unknown
2009	Zorro	Pirate
2009	Ang Babaeng Hinugot sa aking Tadyang	Car Dealer
2009	Midnight DJ's Multo Sa Pabrika	Shoemaker
2009	Midnight DJ's Nuno sa Punso	Constraction Foreman
2008	Daisy Syete – Ulingling (Season 18)	Hitman
2007	Fantastic Man	Robber
2007	Fantastic Kids	Shaman
2007	Kamandag	Tadik
2007	Maalaala mo kaya	Manobo Warrior
2006	Babangon ako’t dudurugin kita	Fredo
2005	Encantadia	Warrior
2005	NBI Files	Muslin
2004	Te Amo	Berto
2004	Philippine Most Wanted	Gangster
2003	Forever in My Heart	Fisherman
2003	Kabalikat	Fisherman
2002	GMA True Stories	Unknown
2001	Habang Kapiling Ka	Unknown
2000	Mother Studio Presents	NPA
2000	Diwa	Ermano Puli
2000	Hiraya Manawari	Kalikasan
2000	Twin Hearts	Kidnapper
2001	Kirara	Manoah
2000	Deltierro	Leon
1994	Bisperas ng Kasaysayan	Katipunero (Introducing)

Theater

Year	Title	Role
2009	Sakay	Sakay
2006	Lapu-Lapu	Lapu-Lapu
2005	No Exit	Kamatayan
2003	Indio Anakbanua	Indio
2002-2004	Noli Me Tangere	Elias
2001	Senakulo	Christ
1999	El Filibusterismo	Kabesang Tales
