= Midnight DJ =

- Title card
- Genre: Drama; Horror; Fantasy
- Directed by: Lore Reyes
- Starring: Paolo Contis (Season 1); Oyo Boy Sotto (Season 2); Desiree del Valle; Jenny Miller; Joaqui Tupas; Bangs Garcia; Erich Gonzales; Meg Imperial
- Opening theme: "Huhuhu Takot Ako" by Miko Pepito
- Country of origin: Philippines
- Original language: Filipino
- No. of seasons: 11
- No. of episodes: 137 (list of episodes)

Production
- Production location: Philippines
- Production companies: Bigtop Media Productions; Double Vision

Original release
- Network: TV5
- Release: August 11, 2008 – May 14, 2011

Midnight DJ is a Philippine drama horror television series about a Radio DJ who works at night and at the same time, together with his team, they work to find solutions to the paranormal problems of his listeners. The series aired on TV5 from August 11, 2008 to May 14, 2011, replacing Impact: Stories of Survival. One of the original Midnight DJ played by Paolo Contis (Season 1), Oyo Boy replaced him after Paolo's character died on the last episode of Season 1. The show ended on Season 11 in a different format than the previous seasons.

== Series overview ==
Midnight DJ is the name of a hit radio program that airs on LXFM or New City Radio. The show was originally hosted by Patrick (Paolo Contis). Six months after the original host's death, Samboy (Oyo Boy Sotto) takes over the position of Midnight DJ.

Joining Samboy are Andrea, the radio station's programming director; Trixie, the owner and station manager of LXFM; Samantha, the team’s researcher; and Bodjie, the team's radio technician.

After one season, when Samantha leaves for the States, she is replaced by Samboy's childhood friend, Chicklet.

Together, the team forges on to bridge the living and the dead, taking on unresolved deaths, ghosts and ghouls as they bring life to the stories that haunt the night.

Midnight DJ in its original format was directed by Lore Reyes for 10 seasons. In March 2011, Director Reyes bid farewell to the show after completing the last episode of Season 10, and is now back with his home network GMA-7.

The last season was known as Midnight DJ: Mga Tunay na Kwento ng Lagim (English: Midnight DJ: The True Story of Terror). The stories are based on real stories of horror in many parts of the Philippines.

== Cast ==
- Oyo Boy Sotto as Samboy - The current host of Midnight DJ. A street-smart lovable everyman with a shady past and a knack for native folklore. Though lacking the ability to communicate with spirits, Samboy auditioned for the position of Midnight DJ. After solving the orphanage haunting, he gets picked for the position after tricking everyone into believing that he was able to solve the case using his third eye. In Parola, his trickery was discovered by Samgirl and he eventually confesses to her. At the end of the 2nd season, he confesses to Andrea and the crew that he has no ability to communicate with ghosts in fear of the crew's end.
- Desiree del Valle as Andrea - LXFM's programming director. She originally worked as producer of Midnight DJ and was promoted to her current position in Season 2. At the start of the second season, she calls for auditions to find the new Midnight DJ. She picks Samboy over Andy and Shugo (Paolo Paraiso) after Samboy solves the orphanage haunting and believing that Samboy was able to solve the case using his third eye.
- Jenny Miller as Trixie - The owner and station manager of LXFM or New City Radio. Trixie revives the show, to recover the radio station's dwindling ratings, six months after the death of Patrick, the original host of Midnight DJ. She once left for the United States but had constant communication with Andrea. (Miller took a hiatus from the show to get married.)
- Joaqui Tupas as Bodjie - The radio program's cowardly resident radio technician. Bodjie also functions as the show's cameraman and driver.
- Meg Imperial as QT - The program's researcher as well as the resident psychic. QT's psychic powers first manifested in the episode Gayuma ng Panget during the absence of Max, the crew's former psychic. Her powers never manifested again during Sam's tenure with the team. She replaced Max when Sam Pinto left the show.
- John Medina as Arthur - The police chief and Andrea's boyfriend.
- Kristine Hermosa as Berna - The best friend and first love of Samboy. The last time she appeared was in the episode Wedding Monster.

=== Dismissals ===
- Paolo Contis as Patrick - The original Midnight DJ, who has an open third eye and is able to communicate with the spirits. He was killed off the show at the end of the first season. (Contis signed an exclusive contract with GMA Network prior to the end of Season 1. He was given an extension to finish the first season but was not allowed to appear in the second season.)
- Bangs Garcia as Samantha "Samgirl" - The team's researcher. She also has an open third eye. She joined the team at the start of the second season. She was the first to discover that the current Midnight DJ, Samboy, has no ability to see spirits. After one season, Samgirl leaves for the United States. (Garcia left the show due to her commitments to ABS-CBN's Magkano ang Iyong Dangal?.)
- Baron Geisler as Andy - A guy who can communicate with spirits. He first appeared in the first episode of the second season. He auditioned for the position of Midnight DJ along with Samboy and Shugo. He wasn't picked for the position, but he makes again an appearance in Halimaw sa Bayong when Andrea was planning to pick someone to replace Samboy as Midnight DJ. (Geisler and Del Valle were originally considered to replace Contis as the radio jock in the show. Eventually, the role went to Sotto.)
- Erich Gonzales as Chicklet - A close friend of Samboy. Like Samantha, she also has the ability to feel the presence of spirits. She first appeared in Killer Kubeta where she temporarily replaces Samgirl, who was absent at that time. She joins the team at the beginning of the third season replacing Samgirl, who left for the United States at the end of the second season. In Highschool Sapi and Pabrika ng Multo, it was revealed that she has known Samboy since they were kids. She lived in the same orphanage as Samboy. In the episode Killer Teddy Bear, she went to the states to look after her father. (Gonzales left the show due to her commitments to ABS-CBN's Katorse.)
- Jessy Mendiola as Gabby - She is also the program's researcher and photographer that was hired by Trixie, together with QT. She first appeared in the episode Pabrika ng Multo. (like Gonzales, she also left the show due to her commitments to ABS-CBN's Katorse.)
- Julia Joan Chua as Swit - She first appeared on the episode of Bata, Langit, Impyerno along with the three black angels fighting the white demon Lucera. During the Halimaw sa Tuod episode, it was discovered that she can help Kimchi to strengthen her psychic ability.
- Sam Pinto as Max - The team's resident psychic. She first appeared in the Season 4 episode, Oink! Oink!. (Pinto left the show due to joining Pinoy Big Brother: Double Up.)
- Don Umali as Chief Apollo - The MDJ team's partner police chief and brother of Chief Arturo/Arthur (played by John Medina). It was not clear if Chief Apollo and Andrea had a relationship but there are episodes wherein you may notice that the team usually tease them with each other (Ex. Payong na Pumapatay episode).
- Lucia Cristobal as Kimberly "Kimchi" Chi - A nurse and previous client of the Midnight DJ team. After the events of the Zombie Massacre, Andrea hired her so that she could use Kimchi's medical point of view. In the episode Bintilador na Matador, she accidentally absorbs QT's psychic powers. She took over QT's position in the team as psychic. She died because she protected Samboy from the control of the soul of Lucera in Kimchi's body. She was going to kill Samboy but she controlled herself and faced the ax at herself, Lucera controlled again and the ax hit her.
- Lauren Young as Jessica "Jessie" Soriano - A blogger and columnist who is writing about the paranormal. Samboy accused her of stealing their cases, saying that Jessie's blog is a copy of the radio show. (Young left the show for Juanita Banana.)
- Xian Lim as Jake - Like QT, he has a third eye. He first appeared in Kalye Kamatayan and helped the team get Samboy back from the world of the dead. He used a different technique to help them.

== Slogan ==
- Lumingon ka, di ka nag-iisa! (2008–2009; 2011)

== Awards ==
- Winner, Best Horror/Fantasy Show - 2009 PMPC Star Awards for TV
- Nominated, Best Horror/Fantasy Show - 2008 PMPC Star Awards for TV
