= Get, Get, Aw!: The SexBomb Concert =

2025 concert tour by SexBomb Girls

- Concert by SexBomb Girls
- Official poster
- Location: Philippines; United Arab Emirates; USA; Australia; Canada
- Start date: December 4, 2025
- End date: December 19, 2026
- No. of shows: 31
- Guests: Ogie Alcasid; Michael V.; Wendell Ramos; Jose Manalo; Wally Bayola; EB Babes; Dingdong Dantes; Arthur Solinap; Maxie Andreison; Elias J; Joshua Zamora; Monty Macalino; Gloc-9; Regine Velasquez; Bini; La Diva; Sam Concepcion; Apo Hiking Society; Jason Dy; Alamat; Gary Valenciano; Ice Seguerra; Apl.de.ap; Stell; Poppert Bernadas
- Attendance: 62,000

Get, Get, Aw!: The SexBomb Concert (stylized in all caps) is a reunion concert by the Filipino girl group SexBomb Girls, marking the group's first major live performances in over two decades. The series, celebrates the legacy of one of the Philippines' most popular girl groups of the early 2000s, began on December 4, 2025, at the Smart Araneta Coliseum in Quezon City, Philippines. Due to overwhelming public demand and ticket sell-outs, the show continued in February 2026 at the SM Mall of Asia Arena in Pasay City on a 360-degree stage set-up. The concert series has been noted for its commercial success, nostalgic appeal, underscoring the group's continued cultural influence in the Philippine music and entertainment scene. The concert broke records as the first Filipino act to sell out four shows at the SM Mall of Asia Arena, and the first Filipino act to stage three consecutive sold-out show at the same venue with a 360-degree stage setup.

The world tour of the concert series billed as "Get! Get! arAWd The World Tour" is supposed to kick-off in United Arab Emirates in March 2026 with shows in Dubai and Abu Dhabi, however, due to the regional conflict in the Middle East, it was postponed to a later date. The world tour kicked off in Australia, and continues to United States of America and Canada, and expected to end in the United Arab Emirates. The concert is also being staged for Philippines regional tour which started in Tacloban City and visiting cities such as Davao City and Cagayan de Oro City.

The concert is the first ever Filipino concert to ever staged at the Etihad Arena in Abu Dhabi.

== Background ==
The SexBomb Girls were formed in 1999, originally as a dance troupe appearing on the popular noontime variety show Eat Bulaga!. Over the early 2000s, they transitioned into recording artists and television stars, releasing novelty hits like The Spageti Song, Bakit Papa? and Halukay Ube, and headlining the afternoon drama series Daisy Siete, which ran from 2003 to 2010 for 26 seasons. With their catchy songs, distinctive dance choreography, and television presence, they became one of the most visible pop/dance acts in the Philippines in the 2000s, and remain a significant part of Filipino pop culture nostalgia. According to Philippine Association of the Record Industry, SexBomb Girls is the best selling girl group of the 2000s in the Philippines by selling over 12 million records (4 studio albums, 4 compilation albums and Christmas singles).

== Production ==
According to statements made by Rochelle Pangilinan in post-concert interviews, the production of "Get, Get, Aw!: The SexBomb Concert" initially faced financial and logistical challenges. Pangilinan said that she had approached multiple concert producers to stage the reunion, but none agreed to take on the project. Five members of the group contributed their own funds to independently finance the concert, with the help of NY Entourage Productions. The 2025 concert series was produced by NY Entourage Productions and directed by John Prats. The 2026 concert series was directed by Paolo Valenciano and Nico Faustino and featured a 360-degree stage design utilizing the full capacity of the arena. During video interludes, members expressed that rehearsals were filled with emotion and excitement, reflecting how meaningful the event was for them personally as much as for their fans.

=== Concert announcement ===
On September 14, 2025, a teaser video was posted on social media by members of the group, announcing a reunion concert slated for December 4, 2025, at the Smart Araneta Coliseum. The post was accompanied by the caption "Para sa mga pinalaki ng SexBomb!" (transl. For those who grew up with SexBomb). According to the interview of group leader Rochelle Pangilinan with entertainment host Boy Abunda, the concert was being conceptualized for a long time but due to scheduling challenges, it was never materialized. Promotional teasers showcased members performing signature dance moves, invoking nostalgia among longtime fans.

Due to unprecedented demand, a third show was announced and scheduled on February 6, 2026, at the SM Mall of Asia Arena. The announcement was made on January 2, 2026, through the official Facebook account of Rochelle Pangilinan. An official concert poster for a 3rd show with "the finale" crossed-out made the official announcement of a 4th show scheduled on February 7, 2026. A 5th show slated for February 9, 2026, labelled as rAWnd 5 was announced following ticket sell-out for the 4th show.

In the middle of the 3rd show, a promotional video announcing the "Get! Get! arAWnd The World Tour" was previewed, while a 6th domestic show dubbed as "rAWnd 6" was announced during the 5th show. In March 2026, the rAWnd 6 of the show was officially announced, originally taking place on April 30, 2026, at the SMDC Festival Grounds. On April 17, 2026, the 6th show at SMDC Festival Grounds was moved to SM Mall of Asia Arena due to public demand of an indoor venue.

=== Performances ===
The reunion concert featured a wide roster of original and former members of the SexBomb Girls, bringing together performers from both the SexBomb Singers and SexBomb Dancers. Press coverage noted the participation of founding member Rochelle Pangilinan, along with longtime performers Jopay Paguia, Aira Bermudez, Che-Che Tolentino, Mia Pangyarihan, Sunshine Garcia, and Weng Ibarra, among others. The concert's setlist drew heavily from the group's early-2000s catalogue, including performances of their most iconic hits such as "Di Ko Na Mapipigilan," "Bakit Papa?," and "The Spageti Song."

DZRH highlighted the precision and synchronicity displayed in the ensemble numbers, despite years away from large-scale touring. Some segments of the show were presented as throwbacks, incorporating recreated costumes, early-2000s styling, and large-screen backdrops displaying archival footage of the group's performances from Eat Bulaga! and Daisy Siete.

The concert also included collaborative performances, such as appearances by the EB Babes and the comedy-dance troupe SexBalls, in addition to guest performances from artists associated with the SexBomb era.

=== Impact ===
The concert was widely framed as both a commercial success and a cultural moment. It highlights the continuing influence of the SexBomb Girls' legacy on contemporary Filipino popular music, especially in the context of renewed interest in nostalgia-driven concerts and throwback events. Rolling Stones Philippines cited "The Spageti Song", alongside "Bakit Papa?" and "Di Ko Na Mapipigilan", as among the SexBomb Girls' recordings that became closely associated with Filipino pop culture in the early 2000s. The publication noted that references to the group have continued to appear in Philippine music, television, and film, and discussed how the group's popularity contributed to the visibility of dance-oriented female pop acts in the local music industry.

=== World tour ===
In interviews following the announcement of additional reunion shows in early 2026, SexBomb Girls leader Pangilinan discussed how the group was focusing first on completing their scheduled concert series, noting that plans of upcoming world tour were still being developed and not yet finalized.

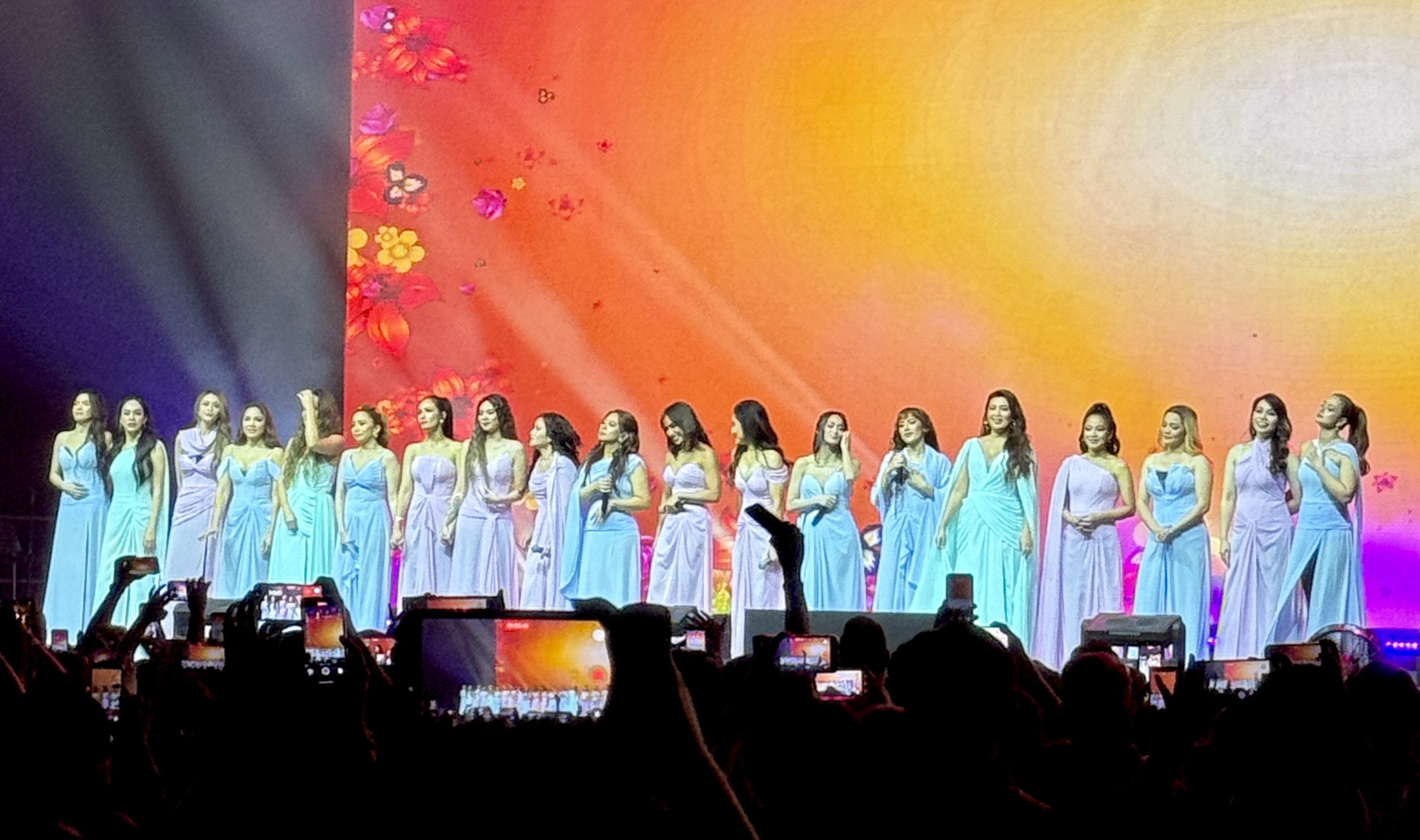
SexBomb Girls performing at the Etihad Arena in Abu Dhabi in 2026

A public petition has been launched urging organizers to bring SexBomb Girls to the United Arab Emirates in 2026, highlighting the large Filipino diaspora in the region. On February 6, 2026, during the finale of the concert, announcement was officially made regarding the world tour billed as "Get Get arAWnd The World Tour". At the same night, concert producer ProXperts UAE opens a pre-sale registration for tickets for an alleged Abu Dhabi, United Arab Emirates leg. Pangilinan formally announced in social media sites regarding the Dubai and Abu Dhabi shows, with ticket selling started on February 8, 2026. However, due to regional conflict in the Middle East, the two shows were recheduled for August 8 and August 9, 2026, for Abu Dhabi and Dubai respectively.

On February 13, 2026, SexBomb Girls announced the first show for the USA leg starting in Lincoln, California on May 16, 2026, followed by a show in Beverly Hills on May 23, 2026. The reunion concert also staged two shows in Australia, in Sydney and Melbourne particularly.

In December 2025, Evette teased a Canadian tour through social media site. In January 2026, Kolorete Canada — a brand that sponsor concerts posted a video on social media referencing planned concert dates in multiple Canadian cities, including Saskatoon, Edmonton, Toronto, Vancouver, Calgary, and Winnipeg, for summer 2026.

=== Regional tour ===
During the 3rd show, members of the group announced a Philippine-tour or regional tour of the reunion concert series, which kicked-off in Tacloban City, Leyte on March 14, 2026. The tour also visited Cagayan de Oro City and is set for Davao City on November 7, 2026. In September 2026, a concert for the newly built SM Seaside Cebu Arena in Cebu City was announced and is set for December 11, 2026.

=== Members ===
The overall Sexbomb Girls collective members comprised many individuals over the years, making it a large, evolving group rather than a fixed number. However, original sexbomb girls members are present in the show which consist mainly the original line up of Sexbomb since 1999.

- Rochelle Pangilinan
- Jopay Paguia
- Aira Bermudez
- Sunshine Garcia
- Mia Pangyarihan
- Aifha Medina
- Evette Pabalan
- Weng Ibarra
- Monic Icban
- Che-Che Tolentino
- Sandy Tolentino
- Mae Acosta
- Grace Nera
- Cynthia Yapchingco
- Jacky Rivas
- Jhoana Orbeta
- Mhyca Bautista
- Danielle Ramirez
- Jovel Palomo
- Shane Gonzales
- Sugar Mercado (2026 shows)
- Johlan Veluz (2026 shows)
- Cherry Ann Rufo (2026 shows)
- Jacque Esteves (2026 shows)
- Che-Che Genove (rAwnd 6)
- Debbie "Debra" Ignacio (rAwnd 6)
- Janine Ramos (rAwnd 6)

== Shows ==
List of concerts
Date	City	Country	Venue	Attendance
December 4, 2025	Quezon City	Philippines	Smart Araneta Coliseum	12,000/12,000
December 9, 2025	Pasay City	Philippines	SM Mall of Asia Arena	60,000/60,000
February 6, 2026	Pasay City	Philippines	SM Mall of Asia Arena	60,000/60,000
February 7, 2026	Pasay City	Philippines	SM Mall of Asia Arena	60,000/60,000
February 8, 2026	Pasay City	Philippines	SM Mall of Asia Arena	60,000/60,000
March 14, 2026	Tacloban City	Philippines	Tacloban City Convention Center	-
March 28, 2026	Cagayan de Oro City	Philippines	Aquilino Q. Pimentel International Convention Center	-
April 24, 2026	Sydney	Australia	Sydney Coliseum Theatre	
April 26, 2026	Melbourne	Australia	Westgate Indoor Sports	
April 30, 2026	Pasay City	Philippines	SM Mall of Asia Arena	
May 8, 2026	Honolulu	USA	Hilton Hawaiian Village	
May 14, 2026	Temecula	USA	Pechanga Resort Casino	
May 16, 2026	Lincoln	USA	Thunder Valley Casino Resort	
May 17, 2026	Lincoln	USA	Thunder Valley Casino Resort	
May 23, 2026	Beverly Hills	USA	Saban Theatre	
July 10, 2026	Edmonton	Canada	Edmonton EXPO Center	
July 11, 2026	Saskatoon	Canada	SaskTel Centre	
July 17, 2026	Toronto	Canada	Great Canadian Casino	
July 18, 2026	Steinbach	Canada	Southeast Event Center	
July 24, 2026	Vancouver	Canada	Queen Elizabeth Theatre	
July 25, 2026	Calgary	Canada	Grey Eagle Casino	
August 8, 2026	Abu Dhabi	United Arab Emirates	Etihad Arena	
September 25, 2026	Rohnert Park	USA	Graton Casino & Resort	
September 27, 2026	Beverly Hills	USA	Saban Theatre	
October 1, 2026	Washington DC	USA	Warner Theatre	
October 3, 2026	Lakeland	USA	Youkey Theater RP Funding Center	
October 4, 2026	New York City	USA	Colden Auditorium	
November 7, 2026	Davao City	Philippines	University of Southeastern Philippines Gymnasium	
November 15, 2026	Santa Rosa, Laguna	Philippines	Santa Rosa Sports Complex	
December 11, 2026	Cebu City	Philippines	SM Seaside Cebu Arena	
December 19, 2026	Dubai	United Arab Emirates	Dubai World Trade Centre	
Total				62,000 / 62,000 (100%)

=== Postponed shows ===
List of cancelled/postponed concerts, showing date, city, country, venue and reason for postponement or cancellation
Date	City	Country	Venue	Reason
March 27, 2026	Dubai	United Arab Emirates	Dubai World Trade Centre	Post-poned to a later date, due to the regional conflict in the Middle East.
March 28, 2026	Abu Dhabi	United Arab Emirates	321 Sports Open Grounds - Al Hudayriyat Island	Post-poned to a later date, due to the regional conflict in the Middle East.
June 27, 2026	Davao City	Philippines	University of Southeastern Philippines Gymnasium	Post-poned due to 2026 Mindanao earthquake aftershocks.
August 9, 2026	Dubai	United Arab Emirates	Dubai World Trade Centre	Merged into one show with Abu Dhabi leg
September 12, 2026	Houston	USA	Houston Bayou City Event Center	Logistics

== Setlist ==
=== 2025 ===
This setlist represents the opening night setlist performed on December 4, 2025, in Quezon City. Variations to the setlist over the course of the concert will be noted below.

Opening Act

1. "Sex Bomb"

The SexBomb Singers

2. "Sige Sige"
3. "Sumayaw Sumunod"
4. "Di Ko Na Mapipigilan"
5. "Pretty Little Baby"
6. "Crush Kita"
7. "Tulog Na Baby"
8. "Choto Mate Kudasai"
9. "Loveless"
10. "Echusa!"
11. "Tong Song"
12. "Awitin Mo, Isasayaw Ko"

The SexBomb Dancers

13. "I'm a Slave 4 U" (by Aira)
14. "Burlesque" (by Cynthia, Shane, Jacky & Aifha)
15. "It's All For You" (by Sandy, Grace, Joanna & Mae))
16. "Jenny from the Block" (by Che-Che)
17. "Get Right" (by Che-Che, Aira & Joanna)
18. "Whenever, Wherever" (by Mia & Mhyca)
19. "Where Have You Been" (by Sunshine)
20. "Beyoncé Medley" ("Baby Boy","Diva" & "Crazy in Love")

SexBomb vs EB Babes

21. "Itaktak Mo"

Daisy Siete OST

22. "Pangarap" (featuring Jovel & Danielle)
23. "Ako (Siete Siete Mano Mano)" (featuring Evette & Rochelle)
24. "Landas" (featuring Jovel & Rochelle)
25. "Magtatagpo Rin"
26. "Sayaw ng Puso" (featuring Evette & Mark Bautista)
27. "Moshi Moshi Chikiyaki"
28. "Tabachingching" (featuring Jovel, Danielle & Monic)
29. "Uling-ling" (featuring Rochelle, Mia & Sunshine)
30. "Isla Chikita"
31. "Daisy Siete"
32. "Tahanan (featuring Evette)

The Solo Prod

33. Jopay (featuring Jopay and Joshua Zamora)
34. "Baile" (featuring Rochelle & Elias TV)

Special Guests

35. "Tearin' Up My Heart" (featuring Rochelle, Aira, Jopay & The Abstract Dancers)
36. "Do You Really Want Me (Show Respect)" (featuring Dingdong Dantes & Arthur Solinap)

The Dance Hits

37. "Heaven Is A Place On Earth"
38. "Angelina"
39. "Chihuahua"
40. "Step Into The Rhythm"
41. "I Like..."
42. "Mamãe eu quero"

dance break

43. "Bakit Papa?"
44. "Bakit Mama?" / "Buy Me" (parody version from the SexBalls)- featuring elements of Baile
45. "Halukay Ube" (with the SexBalls)

The Christmas Hits

46. "Pikpiripikpik (Busina ng Pasko)"
47. "Feeling Christmas (Kung Ano Ang Nasa Puso Mo)"
48. "Silent Night Na Naman"
49. "Wish Ko Sa Pasko"

Encore

50. "The Spageti Song" (featuring University of the East PEP Squad)

=== 2026 ===
This setlist represents the setlist performed on February 6, 2026, in Pasay City. Variations to the setlist over the course of the concert will be noted below

Opening Act

1. "Sex Bomb"

The SexBomb Singers

2. "Sige Sige"
3. "Sumayaw Sumunod"
4. "Di Ko Na Mapipigilan"
5. "Pretty Little Baby"
6. "Crush Kita"
7. "Tulog Na Baby"
8. "Choto Mate Kudasai"
9. "Loveless"
10. "Echusa!"
11. "Tong Song"
12. "I'm Not That Girl"
13. "Lalaban Babawi"
14. "Chuvang Papa"
15. "Awitin Mo at Isasayaw Ko"

The SexBomb Dancers

16. "I'm a Slave 4 U" (by Aira)
17. "Buttons" (by Sandy, Jacky & Mae)
18. "On The Floor" (by Aifha & Cynthia)
19. "Spice Up Your Life" (by Sugar, Grace & Jhoana)
20. "Stop" (by Sugar, Grace, Jhoana, Shane & Cherry Ann)
21. "Dirrty" (by Mhyca)
22. "Whenever, Wherever" (by Mia)
23. "Where Have You Been" (by Sunshine)
24. "Beyoncé Medley" ("Baby Boy","Diva" & "Crazy in Love")

Daisy Siete OST

25. "Kaibigan" (featuring Jovel & Danielle)
26. "Pangarap" (featuring Jovel & Danielle)
27. "Ako (Siete Siete Mano Mano)" (featuring Evette & Rochelle)
28. "Landas" (featuring Jovel & Rochelle)
29. "Magtatagpo Rin"
30. "Tarzariray: Amazonang Kikay"
31. "Tahanan" (featuring Evette)
32. "Sayaw ng Puso" (featuring Evette)
33. "Moshi Moshi Chikiyaki"
34. "Tabachingching" (featuring Jovel, Danielle & Monic)
35. "Uling-ling" (featuring Rochelle, Mia & Sunshine)
36. "Isla Chikita"
37. "Daisy Siete"

Solo Prod

38. "Alarma/Gnarly remix" (featuring Aira)
39. "Jopay" (featuring Jopay & Monty)
40. "Baile" (featuring Rochelle & Gloc-9)
41. "Sumayaw Ka" (featuring Rochelle & Gloc-9)
42. "Sana Maulit Muli"/ "Dadalhin"/ "Araw Gabi" (featuring Evette, Monic & Regine Velasquez)

Mega Prod

43. "Only Girl in the World" / "Rude Boy" remix (SexBomb with Power Impact Dancers)

dance break

44. "Halukay Ube" (SexBomb with Bini)
45. "Salamin Salamin" (performed by Bini and SexBomb)
46. "Pantropiko" (performed by Bini and SexBomb)

The Dance Hits

37. "Heaven Is A Place On Earth"
38. "Chihuahua"
39. "Angelina"
40. "Step Into The Rhythm"
41. "I Like..."
42. "Mamãe eu quero"

interlude

43. "Bakit Papa?"

Encore

44. "The Spageti Song" (featuring University of the East PEP Squad)

=== Notes ===
- On December 4, 2025, show, SexBomb Girls gave tribute to their former manager Joy Cancio who graced up the stage from the audience. The group also gave tribute to the late director Pat Perez and to Eat Bulaga!, who played a pivotal role during their early years
- On December 5, 2025, show, "Baile" was performed by Rochelle with Maxie Andreison.
- On December 4, 2025, show, The SexBalls, a male parody dance group originally from the comedy-sketch show Bubble Gang composed of Michael V., Ogie Alcasid, Wendell Ramos, and Antonio Aquitania performed with SexBomb Girls after "Bakit Papa".
- On December 9, 2025 Wally Bayola and Jose Manalo accompanied the SexBomb Girls during "Bakit Papa?" instead of the SexBalls.
- On December 9, 2025, "Di Ko Na Mapipigilan" was performed in the audience section instead of the stage.
- "Forever" was added after "Tahanan", performed by Evette and Martin Nievera on December 9, 2025, show.
- Jopay performed "Jopay" with the original singer, Filipino band Mayonnaise on December 9, 2025, and February 6, 2026, shows.
- On December 9, 2025, SexBomb Girls launched and performed their brand new single "Pinalaki ng Sexbomb" after "Awitin Mo, Isasayaw Mo", "Sayaw ng Puso" was performed by Evette with Anthony Rosaldo instead of Mark Bautista and "Halukay Ube" was not performed after Bakit Papa.
- On February 6–8, 2026 shows, SexBomb members Cherry Ann, Sugar and Johlan performed in replacement of Che-Che.
- On February 6, 2026, "Baile" was performed by Rochelle with Gloc-9 while on February 7, 2026, it was performed with Sam Concepcion.
- On February 6, 2026, Regine Velasquez joined Evette and Monic during the Regine songs medley.
- On February 7, 2026, Regine medley was performed with La Diva and continued with "Bakit Nga Ba Mahal Kita" and "You Oughta Know".
- On February 6, 2026, show, SexBomb Girls performed "Halukay Ube", "Salamin, Salamin" and "Pantropiko" with girl group, Bini.
- On February 7, 2026, show, original SexBomb singer Izzy Trazona appeared as a surprised guest during the "Daisy Siete" segment.
- During the February 7, 2026 show, actor Joshua Zamora proposed on stage for a second marriage to Jopay.
- Members of Apo Hiking Society, Jim Paredes and Boboy Garovillo appeared on February 7, 2026, and performed "Panalangin" with SexBomb singers.
- On February 8, 2026, Ice Seguerra appeared during "Halukay Ube" segment and continued to perform "Pagdating ng Panahon"
- Gary Valenciano performed "Hataw Na" and "Shout For Joy" with the SexBomb dancers on February 8, 2026, show.
- On February 8, 2026, Monic and Evette performed "Sana Maulit Muli" and "Hiram" with Zsa Zsa Padilla, while Rochelle performed with Filipino boy band Alamat during "Baile" segment.
- On April 30, 2026, "Hombre", "Tequila" and "Venus" were performed for the first time during the SexBomb Singers segment.
- In Vancouver and Abu Dhabi shows, their newest single MAMA MAMA was performed after the opening segment.

== Concert synopsis ==
=== 2025 ===
The concert opened with a dramatic visual introduction as LED screens flashed the phrase "Get Get Aw!" accompanied by brief lyric references from the group's hit songs. The stage was filled with smoke while Power Impact Dancers entered waving flags, after which the SexBomb Girls appeared in silhouette on the main screen. Wearing silver, glitter-accented outfits and boots reminiscent of their iconic look, the group launched into "Sex Bomb" by Tom Jones, featuring extended dance breaks and ending with their signature tumbling-to-split pose as multicolored confetti filled the arena. The members then greeted the audience before a video montage introducing each performer played on the LED screens.

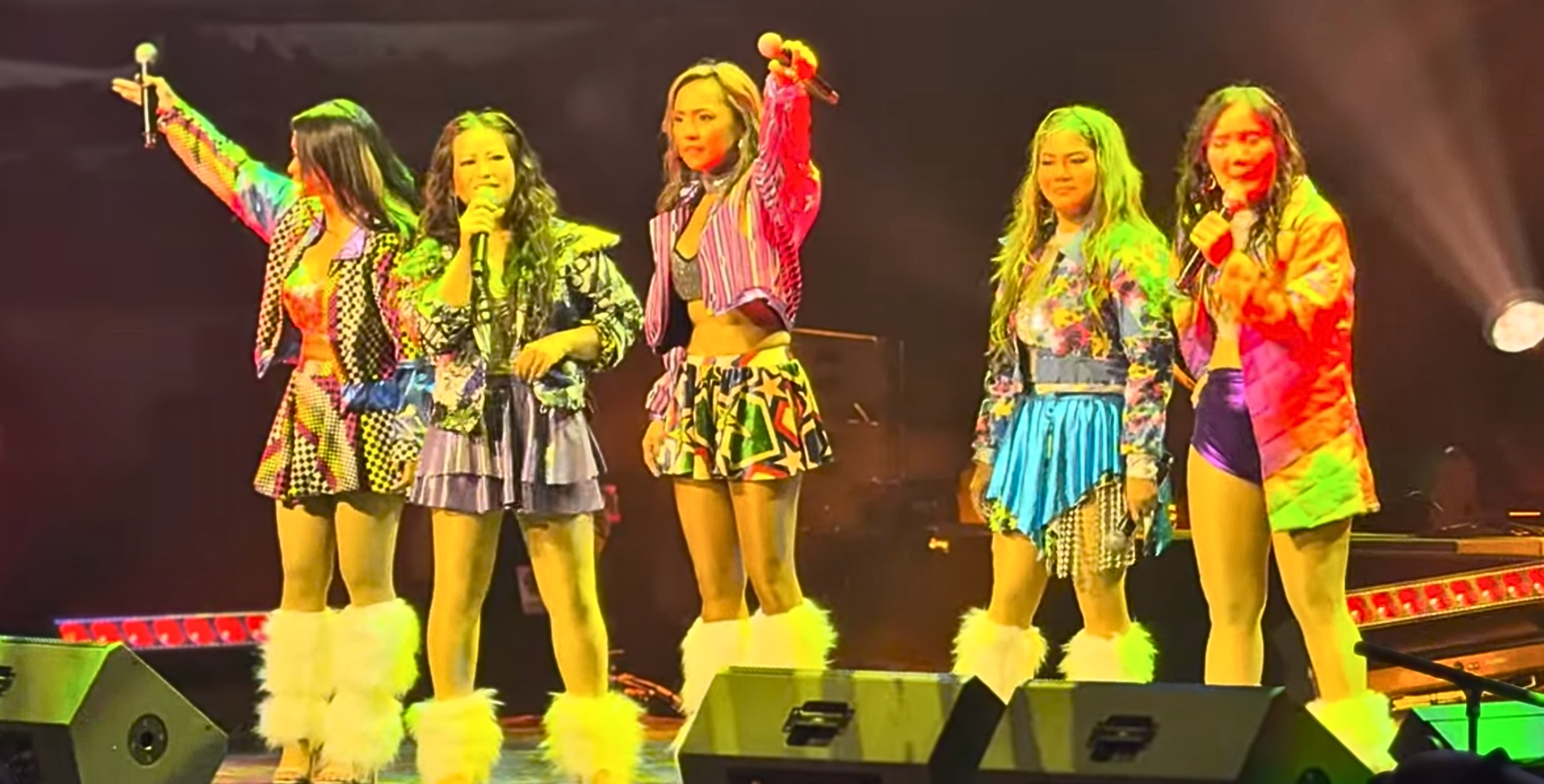
SexBomb Singers performing Echusa in 2025

The second act, billed as "The SexBomb Singers," focused on the group's vocal repertoire. The segment began with "Sige Sige" and continued with "Sumayaw Sumunod," "Di Ko Na Mapipigilan," and "Pretty Little Baby," the latter performed with individual standing microphones. The set proceeded with "Crush Kita," followed by a seated performance on a white couch of "Tulog Na Baby," "Chotto Mate Kudasai," and "Loveless." The group then moved to the stage extension (B-stage) to perform "Echusa!" and "Tong Song," closing the segment with "Awitin Mo, Isasayaw Ko."

Following another video interlude, the show transitioned into "The SexBomb Dancers" segment, highlighting individual and group dance productions. Aira Bermudez opened the set with a solo to "I'm a Slave 4 U," styled after Britney Spears 2001 MTV Video Music Awards performance. Subsequent numbers included "Burlesque" and "It's All for You," with Che-Che Tolentino performing "Jenny from the Block," later joined by other members for "Get Right." Mia Pangyarihan and Maica delivered coordinated belly-dance performances to Shakira's "Whenever, Wherever," while Sunshine Garcia performed a solo to "Where Have You Been" by Rihanna. The segment culminated in a Beyoncé medley featuring "Baby Boy," "Diva," and "Crazy in Love."

Archival footage of past Eat Bulaga! dance showdowns between the SexBomb Girls and EB Babes was then shown, followed by a joint onstage segment. After "Itaktak Mo," the EB Babes appeared in coordinated pink outfits, recreating their one-on-one dance showdown with the SexBomb Girls, with both groups addressing their long-standing friendship and dispelling earlier rivalry narratives.

The Daisy Siete segment opened with "Pangarap," followed by a series of songs associated with the television series, including "Ako (Siete Siete Mano Mano)," "Landas," "Magtatagpo Rin," "Moshi Moshi Chikiyaki," "Tabachingching," "Uling-ling," and "Isla Chikita." The ensemble performance of "Daisy Siete" became one of the evening's most emotional moments, followed by a solo rendition of "Tahanan." After the segment, the SexBomb Dancers brought former manager Joy Cancho onstage, where the group expressed gratitude to her and to their former Eat Bulaga! colleagues.

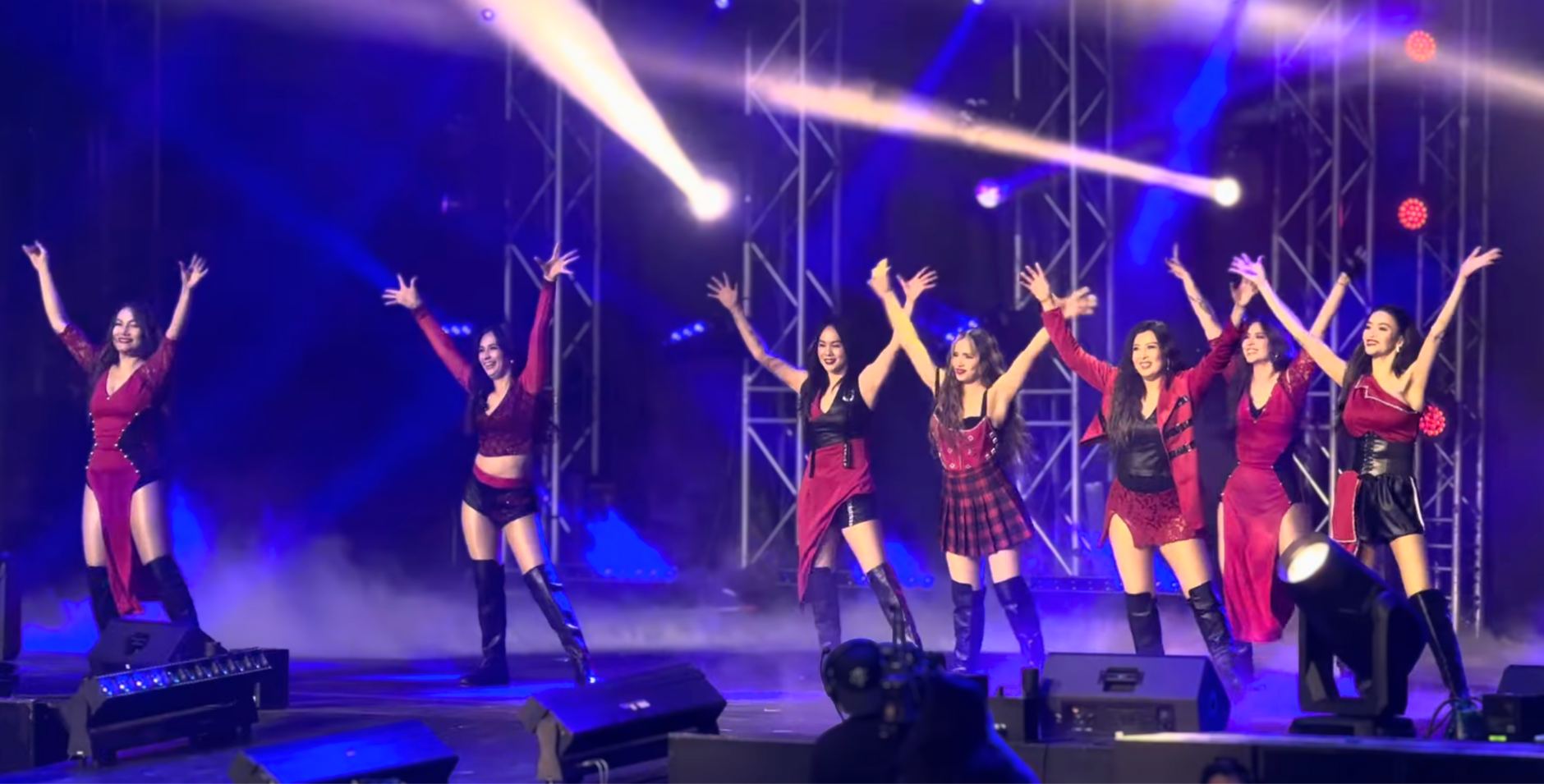
SexBomb Dancers performing Angelina in 2025

Later segments featured individual and collaborative performances, including a solo production by Jopay Paguia to "Jopay," joined by her husband Joshua Zamora. Rochelle Pangilinan performed "Baile" accompanied by a marching band entering from the audience, with the rap section originally by Gloc-9 performed live by Elias TV. Rochelle was later joined by Jopay, Aira, and Abstract Dancers for NSYNC's "Tearin' Up My Heart," followed by a dance collaboration featuring Dingdong Dantes and Arthur Solinap to "Do You Really Want Me (Show Respect)."

The SexBomb Dancers returned with a medley of dance hits previously performed by the group on television, including "Heaven Is a Place on Earth," "Angelina," "Chihuahua," "Step into the Rhythm," and "Mamãe Eu Quero." This led into the group's first single, "Bakit Papa?", which transitioned into a dance-battle-style segment with the comedy group SexBalls, followed by a joint performance of "Halukay Ube."

The concert's final acts included a Christmas-themed segment featuring "Pikpiripikpik (Busina ng Pasko)," "Feeling Christmas (Kung Ano Ang Nasa Puso Mo)," "Silent Night Na Naman," and "Wish Ko sa Pasko." The finale centered on "Spageti Song," introduced by a video montage of public performances of the dance, with the University of the East Pep Squad opening the number. The SexBomb Girls appeared in yellow cheer-inspired outfits for an extended performance, concluding the show with a grand confetti release before exiting as the LED screens descended.

=== 2026 ===
The concert was set-up on a 360 stage with two moving LED-screens above. The concert started with a video anthology as the LED screens descended and ascended revealing the SexBomb Girls on a harness and opened with an extended version of "SexBomb". The SexBomb Singers sang the same setlist with the addition of "I'm Not That Girl", "Lalaban o Babawi" and "Chuvang Papa" before "Awitin Mo, Isasayaw Ko". The SexBomb dancers segment opened with Aira on an elevated platform performing the same number from 2025 show. "Buttons" was performed by Sandy, Mae & Cherry Ann, followed by "On The Floor" by Aifha & Cynthia. Sugar, Grace and Jhoana performed "Spice Up Your Life" then everyone joined to perform the Spice Girls song "Stop". Mhayca and Mia did not perform in duo like the 2025 show, rather performed as solo with Mhayca dancing to "Dirrty" by Christina Aguilera while Mia retained to perform the same belly dancing segment for "Whenever, Wherever". The "Daisy Siete" segment followed the same setlist with the addition of "Tarzariray: Amazonang Kikay" before "Tahanan". In the solo production numbers, Aira performed "Alarma" with daredevil stunts while hanging by bamboo pole. Jopay followed wearing a Wonder Woman costume and ending her number with a hoop ring exhibition. During the February 7 show, Joshua Zamora proposed on stage to Jopay. Rochelle was then seen on circus ring routine for "Baile" and performed with guests Gloc-9 (February 6), Sam Concepcion (February 7) and Alamat (February 8). Evette and Monic duet was added singing with Regine Velasquez on February 6 with "Sana Maulit Muli", "Dadalhin" and "Araw-Gabi"; La Diva on February 7 with "Bakit Nga Ba Mahal Kita" and "You Oughta Know"; Zsa Zsa Padilla on February 8 with "Hiram". After the modified dance break by Power Impact Dancers with the SexBomb Girls, "Halukay Ube" was then performed with girl group Bini appearing in the middle of the production. Bini then performed Salamin, Salamin and Pantropiko with the SexBomb Girls. During the February 7 and 8 shows, Apo Hiking Society and Ice Seguerra joined them instead of Bini. The SexBomb Dancers followed with the same setlist performing "The Dance Hits" same with 2025, with Johlan's surprised appearance in the "Angelina" segment. The show continued with "Bakit Papa" and ended with the same song, "The Spageti Song".

== Commercial performance ==
Tickets went on sale on October 15, 2025, via TicketNet, the official ticketing system of Smart Araneta Coliseum. The ticket were sold-out on November 5, 2025. Due to overwhelming demand, the organisers announced a second show. On November 18, 2025, Pangilinan, confirmed on Instagram that a second date, labelled "rAWnd 2", would take place on December 9, 2025, at SM Mall of Asia Arena. After the first show, the group's performances were trending across social media platforms. Tickets for the second show were sold-out leading to SM Tickets opening more sections including General Admission. Additional tickets were completely sold out the following day. Due to the overwhelming demand, a 3rd show was officially announced after the concert at the SM Mall of Asia Arena billed as "rAWnd 3, The Finale" . On January 5, 2025, tickets selling started for the 3rd show through SM Tickets with more than 30,000 on queue. The tickets were sold out within 1 hour. Tickets for the 4th show has been released on January 8, 2026, with more than 100,000 people on queue at the SM tickets website - the tickets were also sold-out in less than an hour. To address concerns regarding ticket scalping and the use of automated purchasing bots, organizers of the fifth show introduced physical ticket sales for six hours prior to the opening of online sales. However, all tickets were sold out before online ticket sales commenced. The concert broke records as the first Filipino act to sell out four shows at the SM Mall of Asia Arena surpassing record by Gary Valenciano in 2024, and the first Filipino act to stage a three consecutive sold-out show at the same venue with a 360-degree stage setup.

In United Arab Emirates, 15,000 had registered for the pre-sale ticket selling in Abu Dhabi alone in less than 24 hours according to the producers. The show in Lincoln, California was quickly sold-out which prompted a second show.

=== Venue record ===
Venue records
Dates	Venue	Country	Description	Ref.
February 6–8, 2026	Mall of Asia Arena	Philippines	First four-day sold-out run by a Filipino act	
February 6–8, 2026	Mall of Asia Arena	Philippines	First four-day sold-out run by a Filipino act in a 360-degree stage set-up	
August 8, 2026	Etihad Arena	United Arab Emirates	First ever Filipino artist who performed at the venue	

== Critical reception ==
According to a post-concert article by a major news outlet, the show at the Smart Araneta Coliseum on December 4 was described as "a night of nonstop dancing and singing." GMA News noted that members including Rochelle Pangilinan, Jopay Paguia, Aira Bermudez, and Weng Ibarra — among others — "showcased their dance skills that come second to none." The show included performances of signature hits such as "'Di Ko Na Mapipigilan," and featured surprise appearances and guest performances by groups and artists including EB Babes and SexBalls (comprising, among others, Michael V., Ogie Alcasid, Wendell Ramos, and Antonio Aquitania), as well as actor-performers Dingdong Dantes and Arthur Solinap. Fans reportedly danced along from their seats, many described as the "pinalaki ng SexBomb."

Media reviews and social-media reactions praised the concert's effectiveness in invoking nostalgia: long-time fans reportedly felt transported back to the early 2000s — the era when SexBomb Girls dominated the local pop-dance scene. DZRH News described how the group "delivered every lyric with precision, even dancing to the original choreography that made them household names."

Fans reportedly commented that the performers "still look almost exactly the same as in their younger years," describing the concert as bittersweet and emotional.

Abante described the crowd as "overflowing with energy," noting that fans arrived in themed outfits and remained actively engaged for the duration of the event.Abante TNT documented how Pangilinan became visibly moved during the performance of the Daisy Siete theme song, with the moment resonating strongly with long-time followers of the group.

The 2nd show also earned praise for its standout moments, including when the Filipino alternative rock band Mayonnaise performed their hit song "Jopay," with Jopay joining onstage, a moment described as both nostalgic and emotionally touching by attendees and reports.

Billboard Philippines characterised the rAWnd 5 concert as a "living, breathing testament" noting the electric energy of the audience and detailed staging. The review highlighted the 360-degree stage and described the vibrant crowd, intricate choreography and strong vocal performances by individual members. The review further observed that surprise guest appearances — including performers such as Gary Valenciano, Zsa Zsa Padilla, and Ice Seguerra, as well as contemporary P-Pop group Alamat — added depth and cross-generational appeal to the concert.

After the February 2026 shows, Spot.ph highlighted the scale of the production, describing the concert as a structured spectacle rather than a simple reunion show. The publication noted the elaborate staging, coordinated costume changes, and tightly executed choreography, as well as strong audience participation throughout the evening. It further observed the intergenerational makeup of attendees, pointing to the group's continued cultural relevance.

== Docuseries ==
On February 26, 2026, the group released the first trailer for the "Get! Get! Aw!: The SexBomb Docuseries", a behind-the-scene documentary. The teaser featured behind-the-scenes footage from the group's reunion concerts and rehearsals.
