= List of Daisy Siete episodes =

Daisy Siete was a seasonal drama program broadcast by GMA Network and FOCUS Entertainment Inc. in the Philippines. The drama aired from September 1, 2003, to July 2, 2010.

== Daisy Siete episodes ==
=== Seasons 1 to 6 ===
Air-date	September 1, 2003 – December 3, 2004
Theme song	"Daisy Siete" by SexBomb Girls and Lito Camo (season 1) "Daisy Siete" (remix) by SexBomb Girls (seasons 2 to 6)
Director	Pat Perez
Cast	Main cast: Rochelle Pangilinan; Che-Che Tolentino; Jopay Paguia; Aira Bermudez; Johlan Veluz; Jacque Esteves; Monic Icban; Sunshine Garcia; Mae Acosta; Sandy Tolentino; Mia Pangyarihan; Aifha Medina; Cynthia Yapchingco; Evette Pabalan; Izzy Trazona; Weng Ibarra; Jhoana Orbeta; Grace Nera; Supporting cast: Joonee Gamboa; Amy Austria; Gina Alajar; Mark Solis; Jose Manalo

Season 7: May Bukas Pa ang Kahapon

Air-date
December 6, 2004 – May 27, 2005
123 episodes
Theme song
"Pangarap" by DJ Bomb Girls
"Kaibigan" by DJ Bomb Girls
Director
Pat Perez
Cast
- Rochelle Pangilinan
- Jopay Paguia
- Izzy Trazona
- Weng Ibarra
- Evette Pabalan
- Sunshine Garcia
- Jacque Estevez

=== Season 8: Tahanan ===
Air-date	May 30 – August 26, 2005	65 episodes	Theme song	"Tahanan" by Evette Pabalan and Nhiel Guillermo "Kaibigan" by DJ Bomb Girls
Director	Pat Perez			
Cast	Rochelle Pangilinan; Jopay Paguia; Izzy Trazona; Weng Ibarra; Evette Pabalan; Sunshine Garcia; Jacque Estevez			

=== Season 9: Ang Pitong Maria ===
Air-date	August 29, 2005 – January 13, 2006	100 episodes	Theme song	"Magtatagpo Rin" by Rochelle Pangilinan, Jopay, Izzy Trazona, Evette Pabalan, Weng Ibarra, Jacque, Sunshine Danielle, Jovel "Kaibigan" by DJ Bomb Girls
Director	Pat Perez			
Cast	Main cast: Rochelle Pangilinan as Maria Rosela; Jopay Paguia as Maria Josefa; Izzy Trazona as Maria Isadora; Weng Ibarra as Maria Florentina; Evette Pabalan as Maria Evita; Sunshine Garcia as Maria Susana; Jacque Estevez as Maria Jacoba; Supporting cast: Ana Capri as Elena; Ryan Eigenmann as Rafael; Angie Ferro as Lola; Kier Legaspi as Kevin; Glydel Mercado as Sofia Medel; Migui Moreno as Miguel; Richard Quan as Menandro Santiago III; Celia Rodriguez as Doña Asuncion Santiago; Jack Rodrigo as Bullet; Mely Tagasa as Tiya Magda			

=== Season 10: Sayaw ng Puso ===
Air-date	January 16 – March 31, 2006	55 episodes	Theme song	"Sayaw ng Puso" by Evette Pabalan and Michael Cruz
Director	Pat Perez			
Cast	Rochelle Pangilinan; Jopay Paguia; Izzy Trazona; Weng Ibarra; Evette Pabalan; Sunshine Garcia; Mhyca Bautista; Cherry Ann Rufo; Kier Legaspi; Danilo Barrios; Lyn Tamayo; Daddy Wowie Roxas			

=== Season 11: Nasaan Ka? ===
Air-date	April 3 – June 30, 2006	63 episodes	Theme song	"Nasaan Ka?" by Jhorel Ramirez, Evette, Danielle and Jovel
Director	Pat Perez			
Cast	Rochelle Pangilinan; Jopay Paguia; Alfred Cancio; Izzy Trazona; Weng Ibarra; Evette Pabalan; Danielle Ramirez; Jovel Palomo; Biboy Ramirez			

=== Season 12: Landas ===
Air-date	July 3 – October 20, 2006	80 episodes	Theme song	"Landas" by Rochelle Pangilinan and Jovel Palomo
Director	Pat Perez			
Cast	Main cast: Rochelle Pangilinan; Izzy Trazona; Evette Pabalan; Sunshine Garcia; Mia Pangyarihan; Danielle Ramirez; Jovel Palomo; Mhyca Bautista; Louise Bolton; Grace Nera; Johlan Veluz; Jacky Rivas; Cherry Ann Rufo; Cynthia Yapchingco; Supporting cast: Romnick Sarmenta as Julian; Reggie Curley as Alfred; Angie Ferro as Adora; Renz Joyce Juan as Ernestina; Juaquin Garcia as Andrew; Jordan Herrera as Copper; Jack Rodrigo as Jack; Jorel Ramirez as Jorel; Jabo Mones as Jabo; Pocholo Montes as Ernesto; Darius Razon as Miguel Vera-Perez			

=== Season 13: Moshi Moshi Chikiyaki ===
Air-date	October 23, 2006 – January 26, 2007	70 episodes	Theme song	"Moshi Moshi Chikiyaki" by SexBomb Girls feat. Jayne Iona Lim
Director	Pat Perez			
Cast	Main cast: Rochelle Pangilinan; Jopay Paguia; Izzy Trazona; Weng Ibarra; Evette Pabalan; Mia Pangyarihan; Louise Bolton; Cynthia Yapchingco; Molly Baylon; Supporting cast: Yayo Aguila as Lydia; William Martinez as Roger; Ricky Rivero; Natasha Ledesma; Anton Dela Paz; Jordan Herrera; Jack Rodrigo; Jorel Ramirez; Jabo Mones; Owen Rivera; Thai Tomoyoki			

=== Season 14: Siete Siete, Mano Mano ===
Air-date	January 29 – April 27, 2007	63 episodes	Theme song	"Ako" by Evette Pabalan
Director	Pat Perez			
Cast	Main cast: Jopay Paguia; Mhyca Bautista; Sunshine Garcia; Mia Pangyarihan; Supporting cast: Rochelle Pangilinan as Jenny; Izzy Trazona as Sabel; William Martinez as Mando; Emilio Garcia as Miguel; Marcus Madrigal as Darius; Jordan Herrera; Owen Rivera			

=== Season 15: Isla Chikita ===
Air-date	April 30 – July 26, 2007	65 episodes	Theme song	"Isla Chikita" by SexBomb Girls
Director	Jose Rowell Ikamen			
Cast	Main cast: Rochelle Pangilinan as Rosalyn; Arthur Solinap as Marco; Coco Martin as David; Supporting cast: Jopay Paguia; Weng Ibarra; Sunshine Garcia; Izzy Trazona; Evette Pabalan; Toby Alejar; Lovely Rivero; Archie Adamos; Carme Sanchez; Paolo Serrano; Marc Solis; Shyr Valdez; Aya Medel			

=== Season 16: Tabaching-ching ===
Air-date	July 30 – November 16, 2007	80 episodes	Theme song	"Tabaching-Ching" by Izzy Trazona "Aking Hiling" by 3rd Avenue
Director	Jose Rowell Ikamen			
Cast	Main cast: Rochelle Pangilinan; Jopay Paguia; Izzy Trazona; Weng Ibarra; Evette Pabalan; Sunshine Garcia; Mia Pangyarihan; Sandy Tolentino; Jacky Rivas; Grace Nera; Cynthia Yapchingco; Danica Gulapa; Shane Gonzales; Kristel Moreno; Supporting cast: Felix Roco as Jiro; JC Cuadrado as Ronald; Kier Legaspi; Juaquin Garcia; Patrick Dela Rosa; Lou Veloso; Sheree Javier; Angie Ferro; Marissa Sanchez; Jack Rodrigo; Jorel Ramirez; Jabo Mones; Sandy Talag			

=== Season 17: Ulingling ===
Air-date	November 19, 2007 – March 28, 2008
Theme song	"Uling-ling" by Rochelle, Mia, Sunshine
Director	Jose Rowell Ikamen
Cast	Main cast: Rochelle Pangilinan; Mia Pangyarihan; Sunshine Garcia; Supporting cast: Izzy Trazona; Louise Bolton; Karla Estrada as Nessa; Wilma Doesnt as Pitang; Kier Legaspi; JC Cuadrado as Billy; Dion Ignacio; Edgar Allan Guzman; Lisa Ranillo; Archie Adamos; Natasha Ledesma

=== Season 18: Prince Charming and the Seven Maids ===
Air-date	March 31 – July 18, 2008
Theme song	"Cha-cha" by Rochelle, Sunshine, Weng, Evette, CheChe, Mhyca, Mia "Hangga't Tayo'y Magkasama" by 3rd Avenue
Director	Jose Rowell Ikamen
Cast	Main cast: Rochelle Pangilinan; Mia Pangyarihan; Sunshine Garcia; Weng Ibarra; Evette Pabalan; Cheche Tolentino; Mhyca Bautista; Arthur Solinap; Edgar Allan Guzman; Felix Roco; Supporting cast: Izzy Trazona; Louise Bolton; Michelle Mercado; Danica Gulapa; Jhoana Marie Orbeta; Shane Gonzales; January Isaac; Alma Concepcion; Daniel Fernando; Lou Veloso; Joy Viado; Aaron Flores; Jack Rodrigo; Tariq; Sean Oh; Mark Alejandro

=== Season 19: Vaklushii ===
Air-date	July 21 – October 17, 2008
Theme song	"Vaklushii" by SexBomb Girls "Lov Na Lov Kita" by Gloc-9
Director	Jose Rowell Ikamen
Cast	Main cast: Mia Pangyarihan; Sunshine Garcia; Rochelle Pangilinan; Jopay Paguia; Weng Ibarra; Izzy Trazona; Evette Pabalan; Monic Icban; Supporting cast: Romnick Sarmenta; Felix Roco; Edgar Allan Guzman; Marc Solis; Joy Viado; Gene Padilla

=== Season 20: Tinderella ===
Air date	October 20, 2008 – January 16, 2009
Theme song	"Tinderella" by SexBomb Girls
Director	Jose Rowell Ikamen
Cast	Main cast: Rochelle Pangilinan; Mia Pangyarihan; Sunshine Garcia; Mhyca Bautista; Louise Bolton; Izzy Trazona; Jopay Paguia; Weng Ibarra; Cheche Tolentino; Danica Gulapa; Shane Gonzales; Grace Nera; Evette Pabalan; Michelle Mercado; Danielle Ramirez; Sheena Flores; Monic Icban; Sandy Tolentino; Jacqueline Rivas; Jovel Palomo; Johlan Veluz

=== Season 21: Tarzariray: Amasonang Kikay ===
Air-date	January 19 – April 17, 2009
Theme song	"Tarzariray: Amasonang Kikay" by Evette, Weng, Jovel, Danielle, Monic, Izzy
Director	Jose Rowell Ikamen
Cast	Main cast: Rochelle Pangilinan; Weng Ibarra; Mia Pangyarihan; Mhyca Bautista; Monic Icban; Cynthia Yapchingco; Cheche Tolentino; Sandy Tolentino; Sunshine Garcia; Jopay Paguia; Izzy Trazona; Danielle Ramirez; Jovel Palomo; Supporting cast: Aleck Bovick as Nana/Olive; Karla Estrada; Ramon Christopher; Edgar Allan Guzman; Tariq; Railey Valeroso

=== Season 22: Kambalilong ===
Air date	April 20 – July 17, 2009
Theme song	"Kambaliliong" by Evette, Weng, Izzy, Monic "Anyo ng Pag-ibig" by Evette and Monic
Director	Jose Rowell Ikamen
Cast	Main cast: Jopay Paguia; Sunshine Garcia; Rochelle Pangilinan; Mia Pangyarihan; Izzy Trazona; Mhyca Bautista; Louise Bolton; Aifha Medina; Evette Pabalan; Shane Gonzales; Danica Gulapa; Joanna Marie Orbeta; Monic Icban; Weng Ibarra; Cheche Tolentino; Jacqueline Rivas; Sheena Flores; Danielle Sheen Hartmann; Supporting cast: Mico Aytona; Arnell Ignacio; Jao Mapa; Gerard Salazar; JC Cuadrado; Gladys Reyes; Tariq; Garth Ramirez

=== Season 23: Chacha Muchacha ===
Air date	July 20 – October 16, 2009
Theme song	"In These Arms" by Bon Jovi
Director	Jose Rowell Ikamen
Cast	Main cast: Rochelle Pangilinan; Izzy Trazona; Jopay Paguia; Mia Pangyarihan; Sunshine Garcia; Cheche Tolentino; Johlan Veluz; Danica Gulapa; Mhyca Bautista; Louise Bolton; Weng Ibarra; Monic Icban; Shane Gonzales; Cynthia Yapchingco; Jomarie Ann Gutierrez; Stephanie Lantion; Supporting cast: Daniel Fernando; Lou Veloso; Irene Celebre; Camille Roxas; Dax Martin; JR de Guzman; Jack Rodrigo; Aaron Flores; Tariq; Jinri Park; Julian Trono; Kurt Dreo; Special participation: Daria Ramirez

=== Season 24: My Shuper Sweet Lover ===
Air date	October 19, 2009 – January 1, 2010
Theme song	"My Shuper Sweet Lover" by Jaja
Director	Jose Rowell Ikamen
Cast	Main cast: Jopay Paguia; Mia Pangyarihan; Sunshine Garcia; Izzy Trazona; Louise Bolton; Mhyca Bautista; Aifha Medina; Weng Ibarra; Evette Pabalan; Danica Gulapa; Danielle Ramirez; Jomarie Ann Gutierrez; Supporting cast: Aaron Flores; JR de Guzman; Felix Roco; Joshua Zamora; Tariq; Marissa Sanchez; Carme Sanchez; Janice Jurado; Dick Israel; Special participation: Rey "PJ" Abellana

=== Season 25: Bebeh and Me ===
Daisy Siete welcomes back Rochelle Pangilinan to the 25th season of the drama anthology—through Bebe and Me

Air-date	January 4 – March 31, 2010
Theme song	"Bebe and Me" by Rochelle Pangilinan
Director	Jose Rowell Ikamen
Cast	Main cast: Rochelle Pangilinan; Izzy Trazona; Mia Pangyarihan; Mhyca Bautista; Jacqueline Rivas; Johlan Veluz; Danica Gulapa; Shane Gonzales; Weng Ibarra; Evette Pabalan; Supporting cast: Jack Rodrigo; Mike Tan; Edward George; Edgar Allan Guzman; Joonee Gamboa; Lemuel Pelayo; Mel Kimura; Janice Jurado; Lou Veloso; Julian Trono

=== Season 26: Adam or Eve ===
Air-date	April 5 – July 2, 2010
Theme song	"Adam or Eve?" by Izzy Trazona "Take One" by The Daisies
Director	Jose Rowell Ikamen
Cast	Main cast: Rochelle Pangilinan; Geoff Taylor; Izzy Trazona; Weng Ibarra; Sunshine Garcia; Mia Pangyarihan; Aifha Medina; Cynthia Yapchingco; Aira Bermudez; Mhyca Bautista; Louise Bolton; Cheche Tolentino; Jomarie Ann Guiterrez; Angelene "Jaja" Barro; Supporting cast: Ian de Leon; Lito Calzado; Aaron Flores; JR de Guzman; Presley Bellini; Alvin Aragon

== See also ==
- Daisy Siete
