= Aira Bermudez =

Filipino actress and dancer (born 1983)

- Born: Aira Bermudez; September 6, 1983 (age 42); Tondo, Manila, Philippines
- Other name: Aira
- Years active: 2000–present
- Agent: GMA Artist Center (2010-2011)

Aira Bermudez (born September 6, 1983), is a Filipino dancer and actress. She is the former leader of Philippine dance group, the SexBomb Girls after the succession of Rochelle Pangilinan from 2011 to 2017, also she is head choreographer and co-manager. She can be seen in Daisy Siete and co-hosted a limited-run dance program on QTV-11, Let's Get Aww!. She has been a member of the SexBomb Girls from 2000 to 2017.

== Discography ==
=== Albums ===
- 2002: Sexbomb's Sexiest Hits (Gold)
- 2002: Sexbomb: I Like & Other Hits (Gold)
- 2003: Sexbomb's Sexiest Hits 2 (Gold)
- 2004: Sexbomb's Sexiest Hits 3 (4× Platinum)

== Personal life ==
Bermudez married Ronald Inovero on January 22, 2016, in Australia, after a month she had to return to Philippines for work. The couple was in a long-distance relationship during Covid pandemic. After three years of separation, she was reunited with her husband in Adelaide, Australia in 2022.

== Filmography ==
=== Films ===
| Year | Title | Role | Notes |
|---|---|---|---|
| 2002 | Bakit Papa? | Herself – dancer | Main Cast |
| 2004 | Enteng Kabisote | Cameo role | Supporting Cast |
| 2008 | Iskul Bukol: 20 Years After | as a dancer with the EB Babes | Supporting Cast |

=== Television ===
| Year | Title | Role |
|---|---|---|
| 2000–2006; 2007–2011 | Eat Bulaga! | Herself/Performer |
| 2002–2003 | Daboy en Da Girl | Caloy |
| 2003 | Magpakailanman: The Joy Cancio and SexBomb Story | Herself |
| 2003–2010 | Daisy Siete | Herself / Various Roles |
| 2005 | Let's Get Aww! | Herself / Co-host |
| 2009 | Midnight DJ: Gayuma ng Panget | Cameo |
| 2009 | Show Me Da Manny | Herself / Guest Dancer |
| 2010–2013 | Party Pilipinas | Herself / Performer |
| 2010 | Danz Showdown | Herself / Field Correspondent |
| 2010 | Survivor Philippines: Celebrity Showdown | Herself / Celebrity Castaway |
| 2011 | Captain Barbell | Ms. Patti |
| 2011 | Happy Yipee Yehey! | Herself / Performer |
| 2013 | It's Showtime! | Herself / Celebrity Judge |
| 2013–2014 | Sunday All Stars | Herself / Performer |
| 2014 | Trenderas | Herself / Performer |
| 2015 | Magpakailanman: SaveTheMaid | Mildred |
| 2016 | #Like | Herself / Celebrity Partner of UPGRADE |
| 2017 | Haplos | Bar Dancer |
| 2017 | Road Trip | Herself / Guest |
| 2018 | Ang Forever Ko'y Ikaw | Honey Darling |
| 2019 | Dragon Lady | Calista |
| 2019 | One of the Baes | Mimi O. Gacosta |
| 2021 | Pepito Manaloto: Ang Unang Kuwento | Tiyang Lilian |

== Statistics ==
- Height: 5'4"
- Weight: 105 lbs.
- Eye colour: brown
- 36-24-36
