= Mama Mama =

Single by SexBomb Girls
- Released: August 7, 2026
- Genre: Pop, Pinoy pop
- Length: 2:40
- Label: PPL Professional People's Lab
- Producer: Perry Lansigan

"Mama Mama" (stylized in all caps) is a song by Filipino girl group SexBomb Girls. It was released as a single on August 7, 2026, through PPL Professional People's Lab under exclusive license to ONErpm. It marked the group's first official single release in approximately two decades and was released during the group's reunion period and world tour.

The song was composed and produced by Perry Lansigan, with founding SexBomb Girls member Rochelle Pangilinan serving as co-producer. Musically, the song draws from the group's established novelty-pop and dance-oriented style, incorporating upbeat production and ensemble vocals reminiscent of their early-2000s recordings.

== Background and release ==
In July 2026, SexBomb Girls announced their return to recorded music with the upcoming single Mama Mama. Pangilinan shared a teaser on Instagram featuring herself and fellow members dancing and singing to the song in an empty arena. The teaser described the song as a message of encouragement, pride and confidence to a generation that had grown up with the group.

The group released Mama Mama on August 7, 2026 while the group was in Abu Dhabi for Get, Get, Aw!: The SexBomb Concert. The release followed a reunion period that began with the group's concerts in the Philippines and subsequently expanded into an international tour.

The single was released officially on August 7, 2026 digitally through PPL Professional People's Lab under exclusive license to ONErpm.

== Composition and themes ==
Mama Mama incorporates the upbeat novelty-pop sound associated with SexBomb Girls' earlier recordings. Billboard Philippines described the track as embracing the group's bright and catchy novelty-pop style, with ensemble vocals recalling songs such as "Bakit Papa" and "The Spageti Song".

The song's central theme is the relationship between SexBomb Girls and the generation of fans who grew up with the group. Its "pinalaki ng SexBomb" concept presents the group in a maternal role toward their longtime supporters, with the title phrase "Mama Mama" serving as a recurring expression of this relationship.

Pangilinan described the song as a gift to the group's longtime fans, connecting the release to the group's reunion and renewed performances.

== Release history ==
Region	Date	Format
Worldwide	August 7, 2026	Digital download, streaming
