= Bernadas =

Bernadas is a Spanish surname. Notable people with the surname include:

- José María Bernadas (1886–1933), Spanish businessman and sports leader
- Poppert Bernadas (born 1987), Filipino singer, songwriter and an actor for film and theater
- Cristian Bernadas (born 1971), Argentine former footballer and coach
- Teresa Lázaro Bernadas (1912–2004), Spanish painter and draftsman
- Teresa Bernadas (born 1994), Spanish roller hockey player
