= Ryan Cayabyab Singers =

Ryan Cayabyab Singers (RCS)
- Origin: Manila, Philippines
- Genres: Pop, R&B, Soul, Jazz, Classical, Broadway, Swing, Blues, Original Pilipino Music, World
- Years active: 2007–present
- Labels: Sony Music; Ivory Music and Video; Curve Entertainment, INC; management: Ryan Cayabyab
- Members: Poppert Bernadas; VJ Caber; Anthony Castillo; Nica Tupas; Celine Fabie; Erwin Lacsa; Katherine Tiuseco
- Past members: Irra Cenina; Jaime Barcelon
- Website: official site

Ryan Cayabyab Singers (RCS) is a 7-member musical group formed and mentored by Ryan Cayabyab. As of 2025, the group is composed of four men and three women. Their music is focused on original Pilipino music. Since the group's formation in 2007, they have released 3 full-length studio albums and have also made international tours.

== Career ==
Filipino musician Ryan Cayabyab formed the group following auditions in June of 2007. Around 170 auditioned to be part of the group. The initial members were Anezka Alvarez, Kaich Tiuseco, Kyla Rivera, Irra Cenina, Jaime Barcelon, Poppert Bernadas and Vincent Evangelista. The goal for this group, according to Cayabyab, was to be an outlet for his music and to see them launch solo careers.

Also in 2007, RCS released their first album, which was self-titled. It included the single "Let Me Love You Tonight", eight original songs, and four remakes. Off that album, they won two Awit Awards. In 2008, they had their first international concert in Singapore, then began a 30-city US tour to raise funds for Gawad Kalinga.

Five years after their ebut, RCS released their second album RCS Repackaged in 2012. Later that year, they celebrated their five-year anniversary with a concert on July 7.

Nine years after their debut, in 2016, RCS released their third album Sa Panaginip Lang. It contained tracks originally composed by Smokey Mountain and original works composed by both Cayabyab and the members of RCS.

In 2017, RCS went on a U.S. West Coast tour, including a performance celebrating Philippine independence in the Bay Area.

During the COVID-19 pandemic, RCS continued recording and performing music. They performed "Kapit Lahat" on a ABS-CBN telecast, then. In 2023, RCS held their Christmas concert "C is for Christmas", which was also their first live Christmas concert since before the pandemic.

In 2025, they performed in Cayabyab's "MaestroClass Concert Series".

== Discography ==
=== Studio albums ===
Album	Tracks	Year	Records
RCS	Call Me, Call Me; Ayoko Na; Let Me Love You Tonight; I'll Make You Smile Again; Pahamak; Hideaway; Ito Na Ang Pag-ibig; Ba't Di Mo Sinabi; Hibang Sa Awit; Hiling; Hello Joe, Goodbye; Paano Na 'To?	2007	Sony Music/Ivory Music and Video
RCS (Repackaged)	Hibang Sa Awit; Magbalik Ka Na Mahal; Kaya Mo; Nais Ko; Call Me, Call Me; Let Me Love You Tonight; I'll Make You Smile Again; Pahamak; Ayoko Na, Ayoko Na; Hiling; Hideaway; Ba't Di Mo Sinabi; Ito Na Nga Ang Pag-ibig	2011	Sony Music/Ivory Music and Video
Sa Panaginip Lang	Same Sad Song 'Di Kayang Aminin; Friends for so Long; Hihintayin Kita; If I Could; Ikaw Lang; Sa Panaginip; Nasaan Na? Summer; I Don't Know Why; Leave Me Forever; Masasaktan Lang Ako	2016	Curve Entertainment, INC.

== Awards ==
- Best Performance by a New Group, AWIT Awards 2008
- Best R&B Song for "Let Me Love You Tonight", AWIT Awards 2008

== Current members ==
- Poppert Bernadas - tenor
- VJ Caber
- Anthony Castillo
- Nica Tupas
- Celine Fabie - soprano
- Erwin Lacsa - tenor and baritone
- Kaye Tiuseco - alto

Anthony Castillo replaced Barcelon in 2015, and VJ Caber replaced Cenina in 2019.
