= La Diva (group) =

Filipino pop girl group

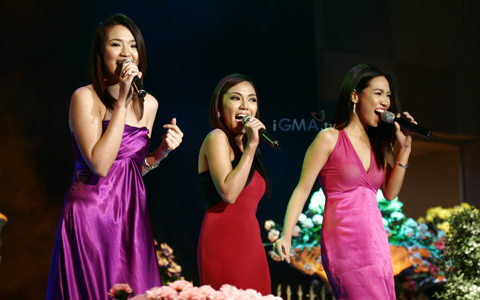
- From left to right: Maricris Garcia, Jona Viray and Aicelle Santos

Background information
- Origin: Manila, Philippines
- Genres: P-pop, R&B
- Instrument: Vocals
- Years active: 2008–2015, 2020, 2026 (Note: Reunited in Get, Get, Aw!: The SexBomb Concert)
- Labels: Sony Music; GMA Music
- Past members: Jona; Aicelle Santos; Maricris Garcia

La Diva was a Filipino pop girl group, first established for the now-defunct musical variety-show SOP. The group is composed of two winners and a runner-up of Pinoy Pop Superstar. The line-up was originally composed of Jona Viray, Aicelle Santos and Maricris Garcia. The group's final line-up included only Aicelle Santos and Maricris Garcia; Jona departed the group on December 15, 2013. La Diva has sold more than 20,000 albums in the Philippines, and earned several achievements including Awit Awards and two PMPC Star Awards for Music. These successes lead the group to being the fourth best-selling female group in the Philippines behind the Sexbomb Girls, Aegis and the Mocha Girls. They are known for the 2012 hit "I Know He's There," which was featured in the OST of Legacy. In 2009, they sang the Philippines National Anthem during the Manny Pacquiao against Miguel Cotto fight however, the NHI had bad reviews for them.

The group revealed that they officially retired on February 10, 2020 in their last performance at Zirkoh to pursue their solo careers.

== History ==
In May 2008, it was confirmed that the GMA Artist Center would be forming a female music trio called La Diva. With its "Three of a Kind" segment, the musical variety show was ready to introduce a new generation of "divas."

Member Jonalyn Viray noted that a meeting for the creation of La Diva was held as far back as January 2008, with the stipulation that each member of the group would maintain their own identity, conducive to their eventual solo careers. While the members of La Diva aren't exactly certain of how the group was formed, they did cite their past experience on the singing competition, Pinoy Pop Superstar, as their common link. Viray and Garcia were Grand Champions of the first and third seasons, respectively, and Santos was the runner-up of the second season.

From October 24–28, 2011, La Diva was invited to guest on three shows in Indonesia. They performed hits such as "I'm Yours" and "Empire State of Mind." On the now-defunct talk show, Showbiz Central, it was reported and confirmed that La Diva were going to begin working on an international album.

On February 7, 2026, La Diva reunited on SexBomb Girls' reunion concert, Get, Get, Aw!: The SexBomb Concert as guests, performing a medley with SexBomb members Evette and Monic.

== La Diva: self-titled debut album ==
The group's first self-titled debut album was released, and a promotional tour was made at major record bars across the Philippines in November 2009. The album contained 10 tracks, including covers of the songs "Apologize," "Angels Brought Me Here," "I'm Yours," "Best of My Love," "Stand Up For Love," and "Gaano Kadalas Ang Minsan," and original tracks including "Kasiping Ka" (the album's carrier single), "One Last Goodbye," and "Rosalinda."

== Members ==
- Aicelle Santos (2008-2015)

(born February 24, 1985) is a Filipino soul, R&B, pop and jazz singer, songwriter, actress, and pianist, who first emerged in the Philippine music scene as a contestant in a nationwide search for the Philippines' next big singer on the first season of ABS-CBN's Star in a Million. She has been dubbed the First Undefeated Pinoy Pop Superstar for achieving eight-straight wins on GMA 7's Pinoy Pop Superstar, and was hailed as the Philippines' "Ballad Princess." She is now known as the one and only "Soul Flair Songstress." She is the oldest member of the group.

- Maricris Garcia (2008-2015)

(born September 26, 1987, in Caloocan, Philippines) is a Filipino singer and actress best known for winning the third season of Pinoy Pop Superstar. She first auditioned for the premiere season of the same show, but did not emerge as a finalist. Two years later, she won the competition with her rendition of Barry Manilow's "One Voice" during the Grand Finale held at Araneta Coliseum. She was the 3rd Pinoy Pop Superstar champion. Her voice is distinctly similar to that of the Divine Diva Zsa Zsa Padilla, thus earning the title of "Divine Princess." She is the second oldest member of the group, and now the "Queen of GMA Teleserye Theme songs."

- Jona Viray (2008-2013)

(born November 15, 1989, in Marikina, Philippines) is a Filipino singer and occasional actress. She is the 1st Pinoy Pop Superstar Grand Champion, winning the competition with her soulful renditions of the classic "It Might Be You," and Whitney Houston's "Run To You." She also received five gold medals and three plaques at the 2006 World Championships of Performing Arts. She is known for her belting prowess. As the youngest member of the group, she had earned the title of the Philippines' "Soul Princess."

== Shows ==
=== Concerts ===
- Let's Celebrate (L.A. Concert with Marian Rivera and Dingdong Dantes - 2008)
- Katy Musical (MMFF Highlights - 2008)
- America's Finest (front act)
- One Journey Concert (Canada concert with Arnel Pineda)
- Only La Diva
- La Diva Unleashed
- Intimately La Diva

=== Tours ===
- La Diva Unleashed: US Tour (Hilton Hotel, Las Vegas, Nevada) - October 29 & 30, 2010

== Discography ==
=== Albums ===
- La Diva (2009, Sony Music/GMA Records)

=== Singles ===
- "Apologize" (originally by OneRepublic)
- "SiS" (remix) (SiS theme song)
- "Angels Brought Me Here" (originally by Guy Sebastian and used as the theme song for Queen Seon Deok in the Philippines)
- "Gaano Kadalas ang Minsan?" (Gaano Kadalas ang Minsan theme song - originally performed by Basil Valdez)
- "Ikaw ang Pag-Ibig" (Ang Babaeng Hinugot sa Aking Tadyang theme song)
- "Kung Mayrong Pangarap" (Basahang Ginto theme song)
- "Ay Amor" (theme song of Rosalinda which is based on the telenovela of the same name)
- "Rosalinda" (slow and fast version; from Rosalinda)
- "Stand Up for Love" (originally by Destiny's Child)
- "I'm Yours" (originally by Jason Mraz)
- Magic Palayok theme song
- "Ang Aking Munting Bituin" (Munting Heredera theme song - originally performed by Gary Valenciano)
- "I Know He's There" (Legacy theme song)
- "Pangarap Ko ang Ibigin Ka" (One True Love theme song - originally performed by Regine Velasquez)
- "Sana'y Wala ng Wakas" (Anna KareNina theme song - originally performed by Sharon Cuneta)

== Artistry and influences ==
=== Musical styles ===
La Diva's debut album produced a distinct mixed style of reggae, belting-pop, novelty and dance tracks. Thematically, La Diva's music highlights female independence and empowerment, specifically in such songs as "Angels Brought Me Here" and "Best of My Love." The trio offers a blending of vocal styles: Viray's soprano, Garcia's mezzo-soprano, and Santos' alto ranges respectively.

=== Image ===
La Diva was known for their "belting" vocals and "sexy" styling. Their label, Sony BMG Philippines, described the group as a "pop group characterized by bold, bright outfits, and big, catchy hooks punctuated by rap verses and an 'in-your-face swagger.'"

=== Styles and themes ===
La Diva has recorded R&B/novelty/pop tracks with styles encompassing urban, contemporary and dance-pop genres. They have named former R&B female group Destiny's Child and fellow Filipina singer Regine Velasquez as among their influences.

== Jona's departure, hiatus and disbandment ==
Though the group was experiencing a string of success, Jonalyn Viray decided to leave on December 15, 2013, to pursue growth opportunities as a solo artist. Her departure was announced via GMA Network 's Facebook page. Viray's departure left Aicelle Santos and Maricris Garcia as a duo.

After Viray's departure, the remaining members of the group, along with their management, took a year-long hiatus. Though initial plans for a follow-up album fell through, in late 2014 the duo continued to make guest appearances on various GMA Network shows. Julie Anne San Jose made occasional appearances with the duo, temporarily replacing Viray during guest appearances and performances in early 2015. Eventually, the group faced management issues leading to a failed album, eventually leading to the duo's disbandment on June 13, 2015.

At present, Aicelle Santos and Maricris Garcia are still artists of GMA Network, making cameo appearances in some of the network's programs. Jonalyn Viray eventually signed with Star Music, launching her career as a solo artist under the stage name, Jona.

== Awards ==
- People's Choice Favorite Group Recording Artists (22nd Awit Awards - January 2010)
- Best Group of the Year (2nd PMPC Star Awards for Music - October 2010)
- Best Music Video of the Year - "Kasiping Ka" (2nd PMPC Star Awards for Music - October 2010)
- Best Group Performance in a Concert (Only La Diva Concert) (23rd Aliw Awards - October 2010)

== See also ==
- Pinoy Pop Superstar
