= Bebe and Me =

Philippine television series

- Country of origin: Philippines
- Original language: Tagalog
- No. of episodes: 63

Production
- Camera setup: Multiple-camera setup
- Running time: 30-45 minutes

Original release
- Network: GMA Network
- Release: January 4 – March 31, 2010

Bebe and Me is the 25th season of Daisy Siete produced by Focus Entertainment and GMA Network. It aired on the network's Dramarama sa Hapon lineup from January 4 to March 31, 2010, replacing Daisy Siete: My Shuper Sweet Lover and was replaced by Daisy Siete: Adam or Eve.

Daisy Siete marked the return of Rochelle Pangilinan for its 25th season —through Bebe and Me.

== Cast and characters ==
- Rochelle Pangilinan as Rochelle Plaza
- Joonee Gamboa as Marcelo Plaza
- Izzy Trazona as Izzy
- Mike Tan as Daniel
- Edward George as Edward
- Lemuel Pelayo as Lemuel Morados
- Bobby Andrews
