= Jopay =

Filipino actress and singer-dancer (born 1983)

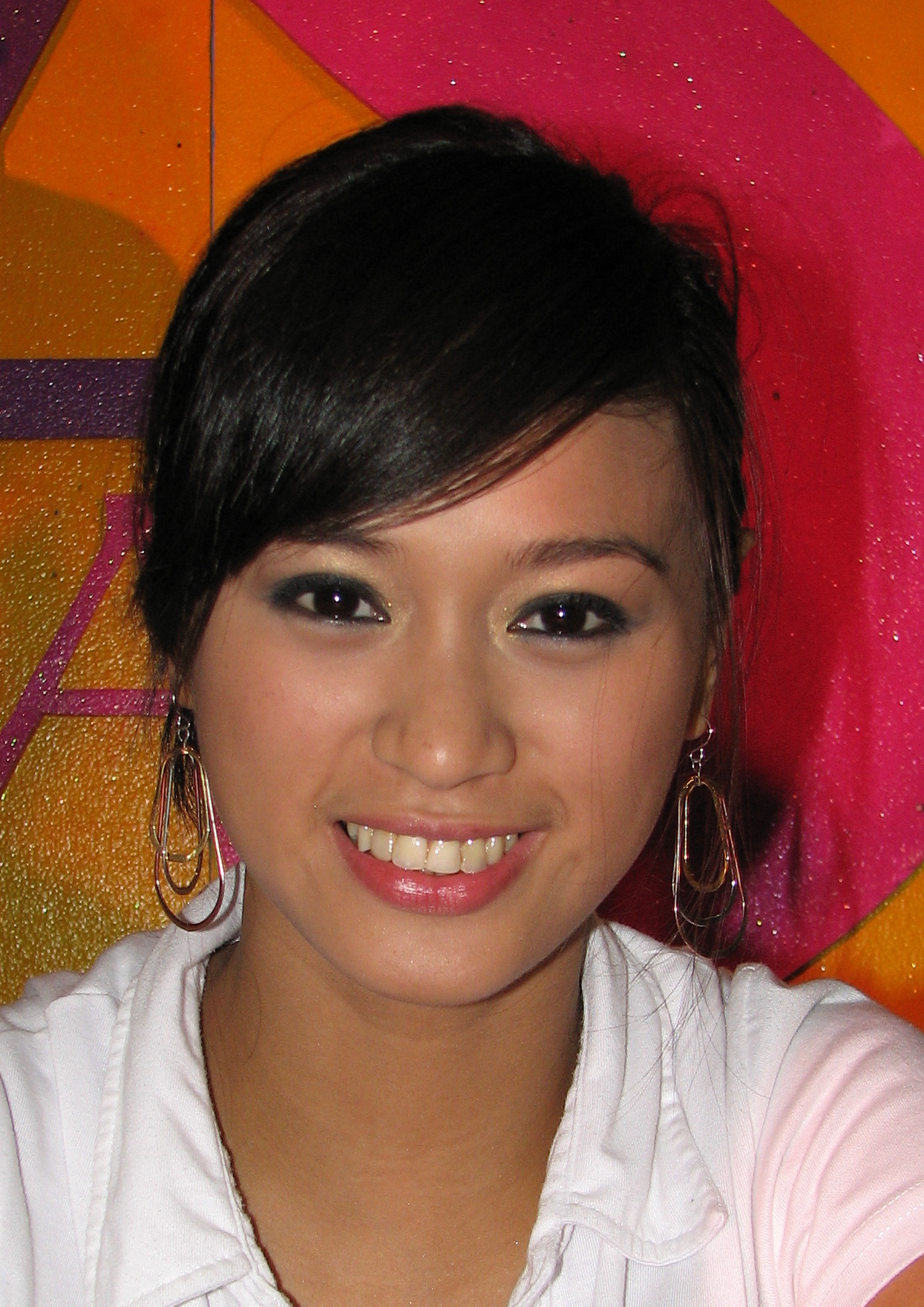
- Jopay in 2007
- Born: Diofanny Jane Paguia; January 3, 1983 (age 43); Manila, Philippines
- Other name: Jopay
- Years active: 2000–present
- Height: 1.57 m (5 ft 2 in)
- Spouse: Joshua Zamora (m. 2014)
- Relatives: Nadine Lustre (cousin)

Jopay (Tagalog pronunciation: [ˈdʒopaɪ]) (born Diofanny Jane Paguia-Zamora; January 3, 1983) is a Filipino singer, dancer and actress. She is a former Senior Member and original member of Sexbomb Singers, with Rochelle Pangilinan, Evette Pabalan, Weng Ibarra, Izzy Trazona-Aragon and Monic Icban of the SexBomb Girls. Jopay is also a cousin of singer-actress Nadine Lustre. A song entitled "Jopay" (composed and sang by Mayonnaise) was written about her.

== Discography ==
=== Albums ===
(with the SexBomb Girls)

- 2002: Unang Putok (4× Platinum)
- 2003: Round 2 (5× Platinum)
- 2004: Bomb Thr3at (2× Platinum)
- 2005: Sumayaw, Sumunod: The Best of the Sexbomb Girls (Platinum)
- 2006: Daisy Siete: V-DAY

=== Compilation albums ===
(billed with the SexBomb Dancers)

- 2002: Sexbomb's Sexiest Hits (Gold)

== Personal life ==
Paguia married Joshua Zamora, a former member of the dance troupe Maneuvers on June 6, 2014, in Fernwood Gardens in Quezon City. The couple have two daughters: Isabelle Alessa and Isabelle Ariana.

== Filmography ==
=== Television ===
Year	Title	Role
2000–10	Eat Bulaga!	Herself/Performer
2002–03	Daboy en Da Girl	Herself
2003–10	Daisy Siete	Various
2003	Magpakailanman	Mercy Sunot
2004	Love to Love: Love-an O Bawi	Gemmalyn
2005	Let's Get Aww!	Herself/host
2005–06	Etheria: Ang Ikalimang Kaharian ng Encantadia	Juvila
2006	Encantadia: Pag-Ibig Hanggang Wakas	Juvila
2007–08	Kung Ako Ikaw	Herself
2008–09	Tok! Tok! Tok! Isang Milyon Pasok!	Herself/Performer
2011	Time of My Life	Darleen
2012	It's Showtime	Herself/Guest Judge
2012	Wil Time Bigtime	Herself/Guest Performer
2013	Chef Boy Logro: Kusina Master	Herself/Dancer
2014	Be Careful With My Heart	Thea Lindsay Angeles
2015	Bridges of Love	Venus De Castro
2015	Buena Familia	Sylvia Montesado-Sebastian
2016	Tubig at Langis	Tonette
2020	Bawal na Game Show	Herself/Contestant
2021	Wish Ko Lang!: Kamandag	Bunny
2022	Family Feud	Herself/guest
2023	Kapuso Mo, Jessica Soho	Herself/featured guest
2026	Kapamilya, Deal or No Deal	Herself/Briefcase Number 19

=== Films ===
- 2002: Bakit Papa
- 2003: Lastikman
- 2007: Fantastic Man

== In popular culture ==
- Fino Herrera portrayed Jepoy, a gay version of Jopay in the latest episode of Oh My Dad!
- Mark Anthony Fernandez portrayed Jopay in the film Barumbadings, a gay character who's name is inspired in SexBomb Girls.
