= Daboy en Da Girl =

Philippine television sitcom series

- Title card
- Genre: Sitcom
- Written by: Jun Lana
- Directed by: Ipe Pelino; Soxie Topacio
- Starring: Rudy Fernandez; Rosanna Roces
- Theme music composer: Rico Blanco
- Opening theme: "Daboy en Da Girl" theme by Rivermaya featuring Rosanna Roces
- Country of origin: Philippines
- Original language: Tagalog

Production
- Executive producer: Winnie Hollis-Reyes
- Camera setup: Multiple-camera setup
- Running time: 40–59 minutes
- Production company: GMA Entertainment TV

Original release
- Network: GMA Network
- Release: 2002 – 2003

Daboy en Da Girl is a Philippine television sitcom series broadcast by GMA Network. Starring Rosanna Roces and Rudy Fernandez, it premiered in 2002. The series concluded in 2003.

The series is streaming online on YouTube.

== Cast and characters ==
Lead cast

- Rudy Fernandez as Daboy
- Rosanna Roces as Girly

Supporting cast

- Jeffrey Quizon as Emoks
- Alma Moreno as Brenda
- Sunshine Dizon as Baby
- Rochelle Pangilinan as Britney
- Isko "Brod Pete" Salvador as Chief Lobatt
- Lolit Solis as Manay Charing
- Rico J. Puno as Boy Brocha
- Robert Ortega as Moses
- Elizabeth Ramsey
- K Brosas
- Gene Padilla
- Pepita Smith
- Bembol Roco
- Eissen Bayubay
