= Mayonnaise (Mayonnaise album) =

Studio album by Mayonnaise
- Released: November 2004; November 2019 (Remastered)
- Recorded: 2004
- Studio: Wombworks Studios
- Genre: Alternative rock; pop punk; pop rock
- Label: VAMP Records (Independent); Sony Music Philippines; Yellow Room Music Philippines (Remastered)
- Producer: Rommel Sanchez

Mayonnaise is the debut album of the Filipino alternative rock band, Mayonnaise. The album was released in November 2004, under VAMP Records, an independent music label. It was manufactured and distributed nationwide in the Philippines by Sony Music.

== Background ==
Tracks of the album were all recorded at Wombworks Studios, owned by ace Razorback bassist Louie Talan. All songs were produced by Rommel Sanchez, accompanied by Kevin Roy (of Razorback) for vocal supervision. Mastering of the album was done in Tracks Studios in Pasig, by Angee Rozul.

In November 21, 2019, the band released a remastered version of the album to commemorate its 15th anniversary titled Mayonnaise - (15th Anniversary Remaster).

== Jopay's resurgence ==
In 2022, their 2004 hit song "Jopay" became popular for the second time because of the social media platform TikTok. A certain TikTok video which was inspired by the 2022 movie Ngayon Kaya entitled "Greatest What If", trended on social media. "Jopay" peaked Top 10 in Spotify's Top 50 Philippines, and it reached even Gen Z and Gen Alpha audiences.

Named after and dedicated to the former SexBomb dancer of the same name, the song was inspired by Jopay's crying scenes in an Eat Bulaga drama special during the Lenten season. "Jopay" was also the most requested song in 2022 whenever other bands or singers have gigs or busking. This led to the collaboration between Mayonnaise and its leader Monty Macalino with viral social media personality "Kosang Marlon" where they performed the latter's off-key version of the song, and Jopay Paguia-Zamora herself meeting the band on a live concert.

== Track listing ==
All songs were written by Monty Macalino except for tracks 9 and 10, which were written by both Macalino and Martin Rebong.

1. "The Only Thing"
2. "Tulog"
3. "Bakit Part 1"
4. "Punk You"
5. "Jopay"
6. "Pink White Blue"
7. "Dahil"
8. "Eddie Song"
9. "Home"
10. "Pseudo"
11. "Bakit Part 2"
12. "Aircon"
