= Monty Macalino =

Filipino musician

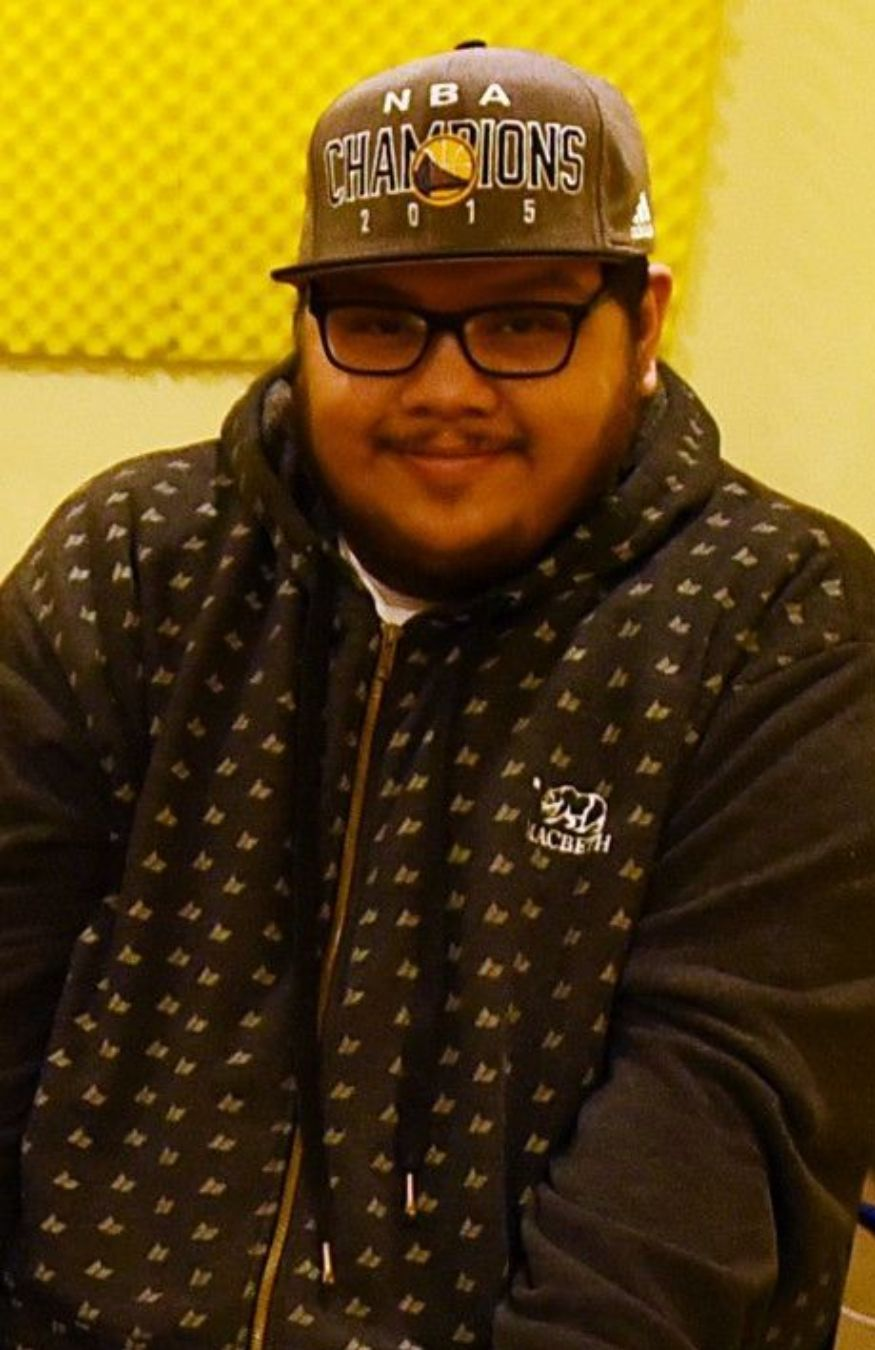
- Macalino in 2015

Background information
- Also known as: Monty
- Born: Florimon Carlo Becina Macalino
- Origin: Metro Manila, Philippines
- Genres: Alternative rock; pop rock; OPM
- Occupations: Singer; songwriter; guitarist; record producer
- Years active: 2002–present
- Label: Yellow Room Music
- Member of: Mayonnaise

Florimon Carlo Becina Macalino is a Filipino musician and record producer. He is best known as the vocalist, guitarist and chief songwriter of the alternative rock band Mayonnaise, formed in 2002. He has also worked with other artists as well, including rapper Gloc-9 on the song "Iba't Ibang Bangka" (2020), and the rock band Gracenote on their single "Kalituhan" (2022).

== Biography ==
=== Early life and career ===
Macalino grew up in a household where his parents regularly played records, which influenced his early interest in music. During his school years, he became involved with classmates who were active in bands. Although primarily a guitarist, he briefly played drums for the metal band Dahong Palay after graduating from high school.

He later recalled experiencing rejection when trying to join bands, including being told that he did not fit a particular image. He has cited these experiences as part of the reason he formed his own band.

=== Mayonnaise ===
Macalino formed the band Mayonnaise in 2002 and won the Muziklaban competition for emerging local bands in 2004. The band released its self-titled debut album in 2004 and became known for songs such as "Jopay", "Tayo Na Lang Dalawa", "Bakit Pt. 2", and "Synesthesia". Macalino said that during their early years, bands depended mainly on radio and television to promote songs. He noted that today, music is more often discovered through streaming platforms and social media.

In 2013, after several releases without signing to a major label, Mayonnaise produced their material independently. This led to the establishment of Yellow Room Music, which operates as a record label, rehearsal studio, and music school. Macalino has also supported younger acts in the local music and has spoken about the challenges faced by emerging bands.

In 2022, in an interview with Rolling Stone Philippines, Macalino said that when Mayonnaise started, they mostly relied on radio and TV to get their songs played. He said that now, musicians use streaming services and social media to share their music. He also remembered that the band got inspired by Leni Robredo's campaign rally to keep performing. During the pandemic, he said TikTok helped bands reach new listeners, and that it became part of the culture, not about politics or age.

=== Collaboration and other works ===
Macalino collaborated with rapper Gloc-9 on the song "Iba't Ibang Bangka", which addressed social inequality during the COVID-19 pandemic. In the same year, he recorded a cover version of "Circles" by American singer and rapper Post Malone.

In 2022, Macalino collaborated with the rock band Gracenote on their single "Kalituhan".

== Personal life ==
In December 2019, Macalino was hospitalized after returning from Toronto due to a medical condition involving his veins. He later discussed experiencing depression and anxiety following the incident.

== Musical style ==
Macalino has described his songwriting as rooted in guitar-based rock. He has cited local artist Rico Blanco and Ely Buendia as influences, particularly for their use of direct language and everyday themes. He has also mentioned being influenced by alternative rock and experimenting with electronic elements, referencing the English band Muse during that period.

== Discography ==
=== Collaborations ===
- "Iba't Ibang Bangka" – with Gloc-9 (2020)
- "Kalituhan" – with Gracenote (2022)

=== Covers ===
- "Circles" – originally by Post Malone (2020)
