= Mayonnaise (band) =

Filipino alternative rock band

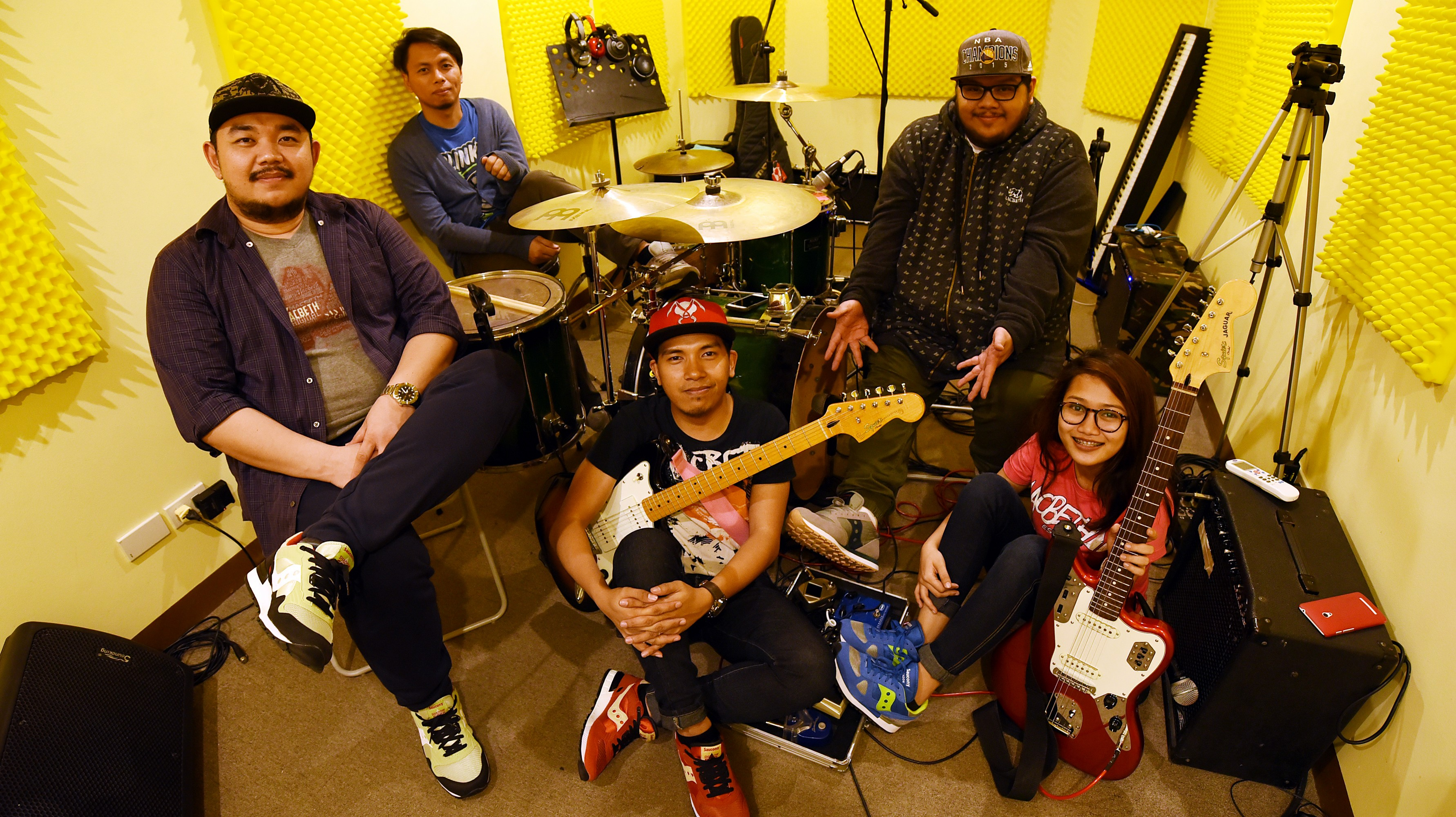
- Mayonnaise lineup from 2015 to 2017, from L-R: Tirona, Regalado, Servano, Macalino, Furio

Background information
- Origin: Metro Manila, Philippines
- Genres: Alternative rock; indie rock; pop rock; pop-punk; OPM
- Years active: 2002–present
- Labels: Sony Music Philippines/Vamp Records (2003–2007); Viva Records (2008–2011); Yellow Room Music Philippines (2011–present); Warner Music Philippines (2016–present)
- Members: Monty Macalino; Shan Regalado; Carlo Servano; Nikki Tirona; Keano Swing
- Past members: Lee Maningas; Paga Manikan; Poch Villalon; Jaztin Mercado; Aaron Brosoto; Maan Furio

Mayonnaise are a Filipino rock band, fronted by Monty Macalino and famous for winning the "Red Horse Muziklaban" contest in 2004.

== History ==
The band were named after the song "Mayonaise" by The Smashing Pumpkins and were formed in 2002 with a number of earlier former members until they settled with the four-piece lineup of Monty Macalino, Paga Manikan, Lee Maningas and Shan Regalado. They were launched into the mainstream in 2004 after winning the Grand Prize at the Red Horse Muziklaban 2004 composed of chief songwriter, vocalist, and guitarist Macalino, lead guitarist Manikan, bassist and backing vocalist Maningas, and drummer Regalado. Their debut self-titled album, Mayonnaise, was launched along with their 1st single, "Jopay", through Sony Music Philippines. The character Jopay in the single refers to a former member of the Sexbomb Dancers. Their next single, "Bakit Part 2", became a radio airplay hit. In 2008, bassist Lee Maningas left the band to emigrate to the United States and was replaced by Poch Villalon.

Their follow-up 2nd album, Pa'no Nangyari Yun?, was released on 2006, with their carrier single "Salamin". The same year, the band also covered the song "Ipagpatawad Mo", originally recorded by VST and Company. The song was included in their collaboration album, Hopia Mani Popcorn.

On March 21, 2008, Mayonnaise released their 3rd album, Tersera, which was launched with the singles "Singungaling", "Torres" and "Sakto". The band released their 4th album, Pula, in 2010 with the carrier single "Sa Pula, Sa Puti".

On May 10, 2011, the group also sang "Sabay Tayo", the TV theme song of ABS-CBN 2's reality show The Biggest Loser: Pinoy Edition.

In 2013, Paga Manikan left the group to concentrate on his own band, the Banat Boys. Popularly known as a 4-piece group, Mayonnaise announced its 3 new members shortly after Manikan's departure through their official social media accounts: Aaron Brosoto, Carlo Servano and Jaztin Mercado, who all used to play with them as session musicians on guitars and keyboards.

In 2014, keyboardist Jaztin Mercado left the band to move to Singapore. In the same year, the band recruited Maan Furio to play guitars, as well as do backing vocals. In late 2014, bassist and backing vocalist Poch Villalon also left the band to pursue other interests. Villalon has since been a session player for Rico Blanco and regular synth player and backing vocalist of Silent Sanctuary after departing and was replaced by Nikki Tirona to fill in his position as bassist and backing vocalist for the band. In mid-2015, lead guitarist Aaron Brosoto left the band to pursue other interests as well.

In November 2017, guitarist and backing vocalist Maan Furio amicably left the band to pursue a professional career in Dubai, UAE. Keano Swing later filled in her spot as replacement. However, later in 2020, Furio returned to the band as a session guitarist and backing vocalist.

In November 2019, a remastered version of the band's eponymous debut album was released in commemoration of their 15th anniversary.

The song "Jopay" experienced a resurgence in popularity after becoming viral on Tiktok in late 2022 and early 2023, attributed to its use as part of the soundtrack of the 2022 film Ngayon Kaya. The song entered the top 25 in Billboard's Philippines Songs chart, spending a total of 12 weeks and peaking at number 5. Mayonnaise acknowledged their 2004 song's popularity by performing it live together with Kosang Marlon, a social media personality who popularized a modified rendition of the song on Tiktok.

== Band members ==
=== Current members ===
- Monty Macalino – lead vocals, guitars, keyboard synthesizer (2002–present)
- Shan Regalado – drums, percussion (2002–present)
- Carlo Servano – guitars (2013–present); backing vocals (2017–present)
- Nikki Tirona – bass guitar, backing vocals (2014–present)
- Keano Swing – guitars, backing vocals (2017–present)

=== Touring members ===
- Jio Clavano – guitars, backing vocals (2017–present)

=== Former members ===
- Lee Maningas – bass guitar, backing vocals (2002–2008, occasional guesting 2022–present)
- Paga Manikan – guitars (2002–2013, occasional guesting 2021–present)
- Poch Villalon – bass guitar, backing vocals (2008–2014)
- Jaztin Mercado – keyboards, keytar (2013–2014)
- Aaron Brosoto – guitars, backing vocals (2013–2015)
- Maan Furio – acoustic guitar, guitars, backing vocals (2014–2017, touring 2020–present)

== Discography ==
=== Studio albums ===
Album	Tracks	Year	Records
Mayonnaise	The Only Thing; Tulog; Bakit Part 1 Punk You; Jopay; Pink White Blue; Dahil; Eddie Song; Home; Pseudo; Bakit Part 2 Aircon	2004	Sony Music / VAMP Records
Pa'no Nangyari Yun?	Pa'no Nangyari Yun? Bago; Panaginip; Salamin; Deeper Meaning of Love; Oreo; Patalim; Turn; Japan (Of Knives And Scissors); 5:03; Sana Kung (Ayaw Mo Na); Drama	2006	Sony Music / VAMP Records
Tersera	Ikaw; Sinungaling; Tersera; Sakto; Looking for Love; Bitin; Paalam; Voices; Binaliwala; Skipper; Sa Piling Mo; Ipagpatawad Mo; Torres	2008	Viva Records
Pula	L'ouverture in Resso; Talo; Sa Pula, Sa Puti; Tabla; Mahirap; Buhay (Paulit-Ulit); Dahil Ikaw (Ang Kailangan Ko); Kapag Lasing Malambing; Salamat I. Salamat II. Ang Gamot III. Dahil Ikaw (Reprise); Queresma; Awit sa mga Buhay Bente; Synesthesia	2010	Viva Records
Tayo Na Lang Dalawa	Bwelo; Tayo na Lang Dalawa; Parang; Pag Wala Ka; Paraan; Porta; Ayaw Mo Na Sa Akin; Malala; Susan; Dear Classmate	2014	Yellow Room Music Philippines
For the Rest of My Life	For the Rest of My Life; You Can't Be Right; Five Ever; Live Your Life; Lucky Star; Here in My Heart; Unconditionally; Kathryn; Los Angeles; Hopeless	2016	Yellow Room Music Philippines / Warner Music Philippines (Digital Release)
Mayonnaise - (15th Anniversary Remaster)	The Only Thing; Tulog; Bakit Part 1 Punk You; Jopay; Pink White Blue; Dahil; Eddie Song; Home; Pseudo; Bakit Part 2 Aircon	2019	Yellow Room Music Philippines
Gusto Ko Lang Kasama Ka Palagi Pero Hindi Pwede	Kumusta; Panimula; Gusto Ko Lang; Hindi Pwede; Kung Di Rin Ikaw; Magkalapit; Magkalayo; Tala At Tamis; Iisa Lang; Gulo; Bumalik Ka Na; Balimbing; Bangin; Kapitbahay; Oras; Hangin; Wag Mo Akong Iwan; Sayang, Pt. 1 Sayang, Pt. 2 Panapos	2018	Yellow Room Music Philippines
Thanks For Everything	Dragon; Buang (Album Version); Anything (Album Version); Iyakin; Safe; Red1; Tiger; Buang (XERXESBAKKER Remix)	2024	Yellow Room Music Philippines

=== Compilation albums ===
- Red Horse Muziklaban 2004 Compilation (Sony Music, 2004)
- Pinoy Blonde OST (Star Music, 2005)
- The Best Of Manila Sound: Hopia Mani Popcorn (Viva Records, 2007)
- Live! The Album: Music of the Level Up! Nation (Star Music, 2008)
- The Reunion: An Eraserheads Tribute Album (Star Music, 2012)

=== Live albums ===
- Live At The Social House (2018)
- Mayo20: The Finale (Live at QC Circle) (2023)

=== Extended Plays (EP) ===
- B-sides & Rarities (2012)
- Mayonnaise 2014 (2014)
- Pa'no Nangyari Yun (2016)

=== Singles and music videos ===
- Jopay
- Bakit Part 2
- Ipagpatawad Mo (originally by VST & Co., also covered by Janno Gibbs)
- Ligaya (originally by The Eraserheads, also covered by Kitchie Nadal)
- Sinungaling
- Tersera
- Torres
- Sa Pula, Sa Puti
- Kapag Lasing Malambing
- Sabay Tayo (theme from ABS-CBN 2's The Biggest Loser: Pinoy Edition)
- Dahil Ikaw (Ang Kailangan Ko)
- Synesthesia
- Sana Kung (2012 re-release)
- Paraan
- Parang
- Dear Classmate
- Porta
- Ayaw Mo Na Sa Akin
- Pag Wala Ka
- Tayo Na Lang Dalawa
- You Can't Be Right
- Five Ever
- Kumander
- Buang
- Anything
- Dragon

== Awards and nominations ==
Year	Award giving body	Category	Nominated work	Results
2007	MYX Music Awards	Favorite Indie Artist	—N/a	Nominated
