= Show Me Da Manny =

Philippine television sitcom series

- Title card
- Genre: Sitcom
- Starring: Manny Pacquiao; Marian Rivera
- Opening theme: "Show Me Da Manny"
- Country of origin: Philippines
- Original language: Tagalog
- No. of seasons: 2
- No. of episodes: 98

Production
- Executive producer: Wilma Galvante
- Camera setup: Multiple-camera setup
- Running time: 90 minutes
- Production company: GMA Entertainment TV

Original release
- Network: GMA Network
- Release: August 23, 2009 – July 10, 2011

Show Me Da Manny is a Philippine television sitcom series broadcast by GMA Network. Starring Manny Pacquiao and Marian Rivera, it premiered on August 23, 2009, on the network's Linggobingo sa Gabi line up. The series concluded on July 10, 2011, with a total of 98 episodes.

The series is streaming online on YouTube.

== Cast and characters ==
Cast

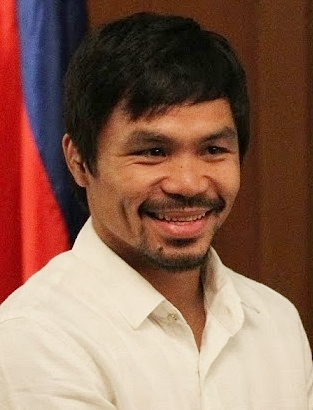
Manny Pacquiao

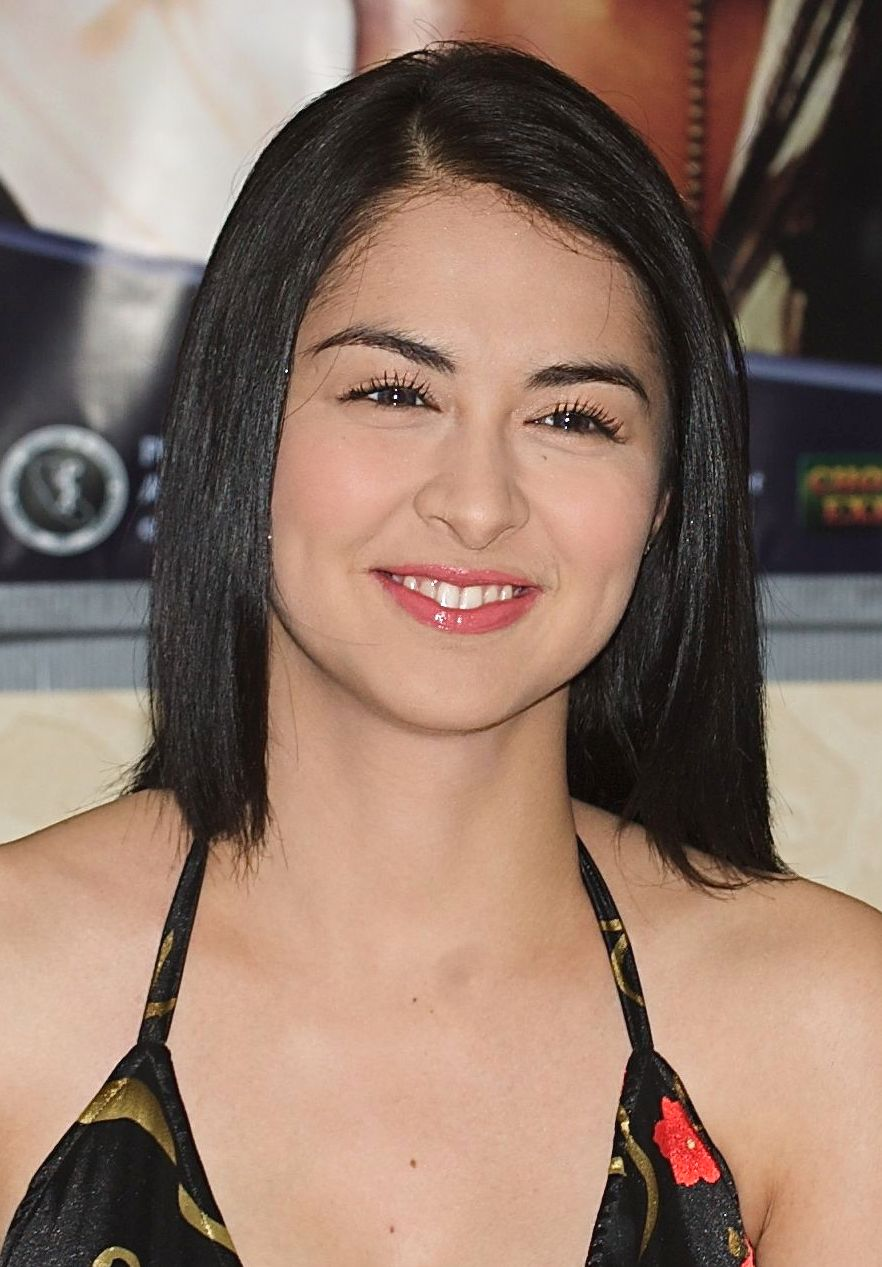
Marian Rivera

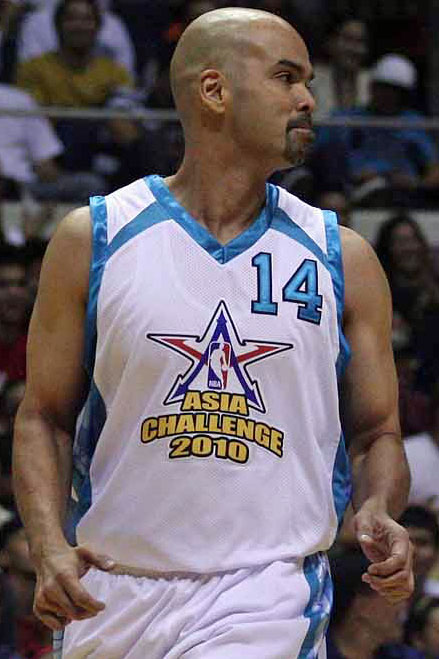
Benjie Paras

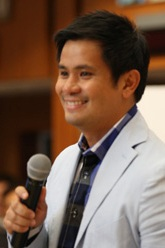
Ogie Alcasid

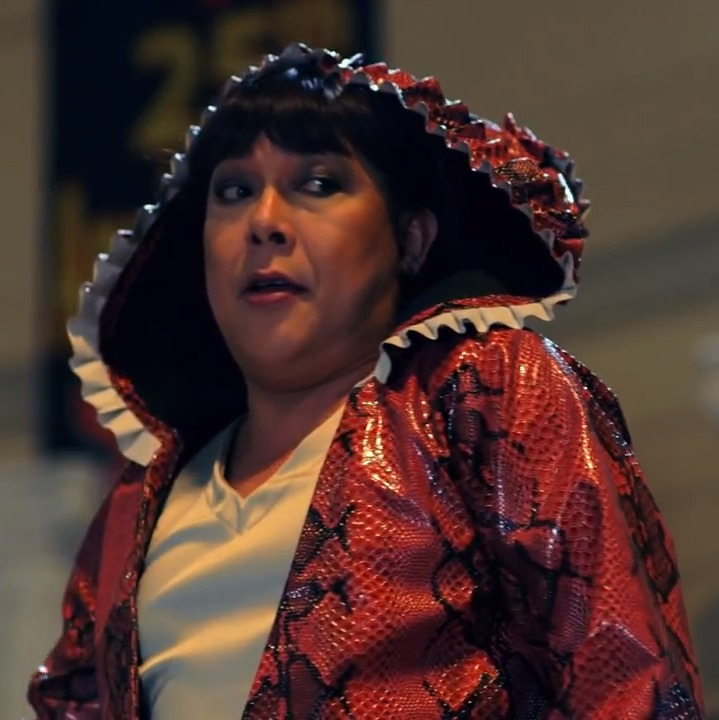
John Lapus

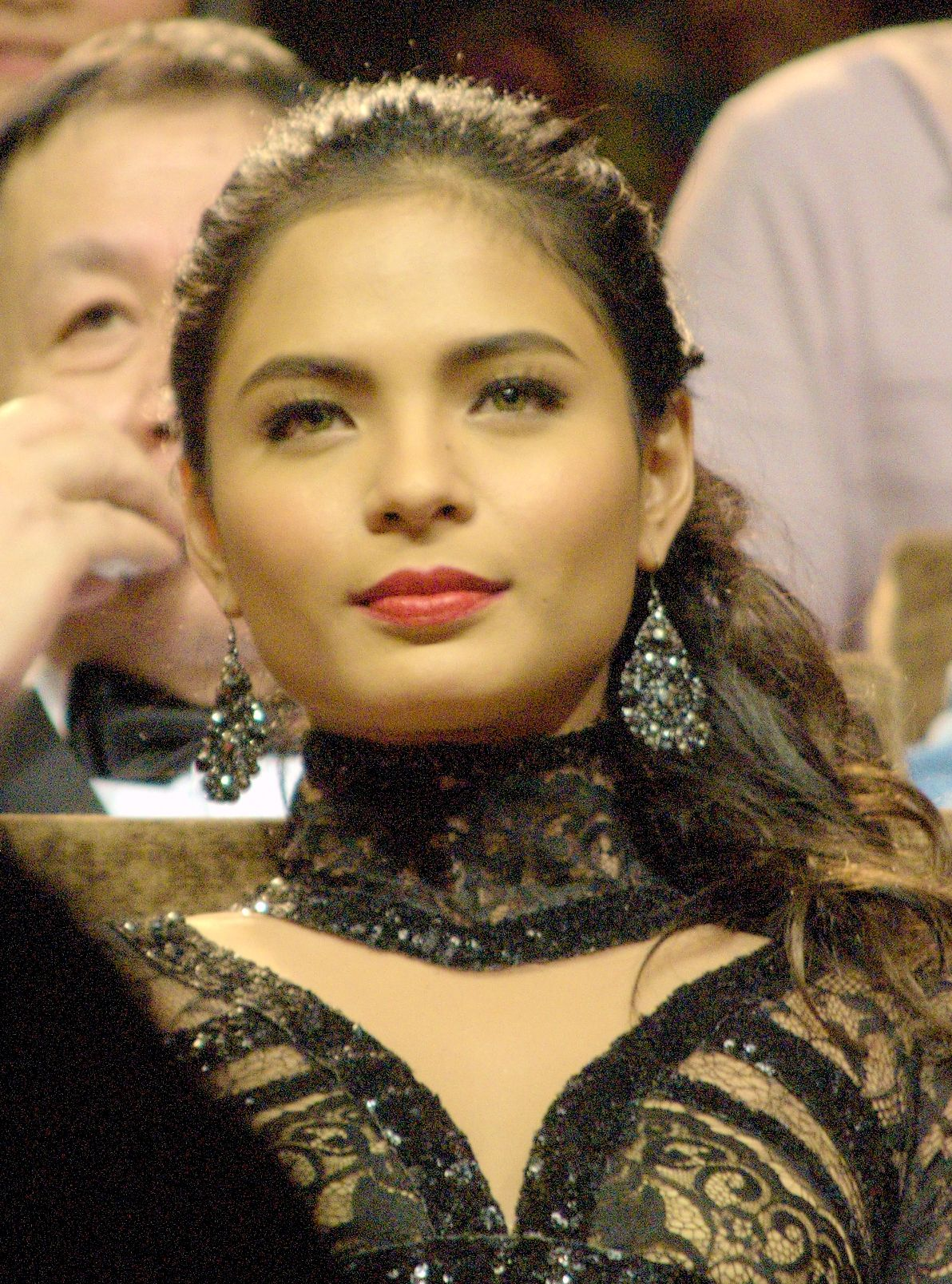
Lovi Poe

Lead cast

- Marian Rivera as Manuella "Ella/Manny" Paredes
- Manny Pacquiao as Manuel "Manny" Santos

Supporting cast

- Paolo Contis as Eric Paredes
- Benjie Paras as Oscar Paredes
- AJ Dee as Marco Antonio Barreiro
- Gladys Guevarra as Banig
- Onyok Velasco as J-R
- Jai Reyes as Jai
- Ogie Alcasid as Manny Pacute
- Rochelle Pangilinan as Maria Juana "Rihanna" Balbaqua
- John Lapus as Nicolas "Nicole" Ty
- Lovi Poe as Hannah Montano
- Kevin Santos as Chris Brawner
- Mike Nacua as Usher
- Lito Camo as Tolits
- Carl Acosta as Jonas
- Marvin Kiefer as Marvin
- Tuesday Vargas as Socorro "Shakira" Domingo

== Ratings ==
According to AGB Nielsen Philippines' Mega Manila household television ratings, the pilot episode of Show Me Da Manny earned a 23.3% rating. The final episode scored an 11.2% rating.

== Accolades ==
Accolades received by Show Me Da Manny
Year	Award	Category	Recipient	Result	Ref.
2010	2010 Catholic Mass Media Awards	Best Comedy Show	Show Me Da Manny	Nominated	
2010	24th PMPC Star Awards for Television	Best Comedy Show	Show Me Da Manny	Nominated	
2011	8th Golden Screen TV Awards	Outstanding Comedy Program	Show Me Da Manny	Nominated	
2011	8th Golden Screen TV Awards	Outstanding Supporting Actor in a Gag or Comedy Program	John Lapus	Won	
2011	8th Golden Screen TV Awards	Outstanding Supporting Actress in a Gag or Comedy Show	Gladys Guevarra	Nominated	
2011	25th PMPC Star Awards for Television	Best Comedy Show	Show Me Da Manny	Nominated	
2012	26th PMPC Star Awards for Television	Best Comedy/Gag Show	Show Me Da Manny	Nominated	
