= Poppert Bernadas =

- Born: Poppert A. Bernadas; March 23, 1987 (age 39)
- Origin: Davao City
- Genres: pop, ballad, pop-rock, musical theater
- Occupations: Singer, songwriter, film actor, theater actor
- Years active: 2007–present

Poppert Aparis Bernadas (born March 23, 1987) is a Filipino singer, songwriter and an actor for film and theater.

National Artist of the Philippines for Music Ryan Cayabyab described Poppert as " a unique Filipino talent...gifted with an extraordinary voice quality and range, and excellent artistry."

== Career ==
Poppert has been a member of the Ryan Cayabyab Singers (RCS) since 2007. The group has performed in concerts across Asia, Australia, Canada, Europe, and the United States.

Since 2010, he has performed in various musical productions, including Rak of Aegis, Magsimula Ka, Godspell, among others.

In 2015, he auditioned for The Voice of the Philippines Season 2 and advanced successfully.

In 2018, he was appointed as a board member of Film Development Council of the Philippines' (FDCP) Cinema Evaluation Board representing the arts, academe, business and other sectors.

In 2021, he collaborated with National Artist for Music Ryan Cayabyab for the song “Mama Ko,” a love letter dedicated to his late mother.

In 2023, he was appointed as Board of Director of Bataan Shipyard & Engineering Co. and Inc. (BASECO).

In 2023, he collaborated with asia's songbird Regine Velasquez for the song called Bitaw.

In 2025, he collaborated with Paolo Benjamin of Ben&Ben for the song ‘Kung Hindi Na Kaya’.

In December 2025, he launched his solo career after nearly two decades with the Ryan Cayabyab Singers, marking a new chapter focused on his own music and independent projects.

== Educational background ==
Poppert earned a Bachelor of Science degree in Tourism from the University of the Philippines Diliman. He later pursued graduate studies in Urban and Regional Planning at the same university.
