= Daisy Siete =

Philippine television drama series

- Title card
- Genre: Drama
- Starring: SexBomb Girls
- Theme music composer: Lito Camo
- Opening theme: "Daisy Siete" by the SexBomb Girls
- Country of origin: Philippines
- Original language: Tagalog
- No. of seasons: 26
- No. of episodes: (list of episodes)

Production
- Executive producer: Joy S. Cancio
- Camera setup: Multiple-camera setup
- Running time: 30–45 minutes
- Production companies: Focus Entertainment Inc.; TAPE Inc.

Original release
- Network: GMA Network
- Release: September 1, 2003 – July 2, 2010

Daisy Siete (transl. Daisy Seven) is a Philippine television drama anthology series broadcast by GMA Network. Starring the SexBomb Girls, it premiered on September 1, 2003 on the network's Dramarama sa Hapon line up. The series concluded on July 2, 2010, with a total of 26 seasons.

== Cast ==
- Rochelle Pangilinan
- Jopay
- Sunshine Garcia
- Mia Pangyarihan

== Seasons ==
Seasons 1 to 6 were weekly episodes, in which the story was not serial.

Season	Title
7	May Bukas Pa ang Kahapon
8	Tahanan
9	Ang Pitong Maria
10	Sayaw ng Puso
11	Nasaan Ka?
12	Landas
13	Moshi Moshi Chikiyaki
14	Siete Siete, Mano Mano
15	Isla Chikita
16	Tabaching-Ching
17	Ulingling
18	Prince Charming and the Seven Maids
19	Vaklushii
20	Tinderella
21	Tarzariray: Amasonang Kikay
22	Kambalilong
23	Cha Cha Muchacha
24	My Shuper Sweet Lover
25	Bebe and Me
26	Adam or Eve

== Ratings ==
According to AGB Nielsen Philippines' Mega Manila People ratings, the final episode of Daisy Siete scored a 5.2% rating.

== Accolades ==
Accolades received by Daisy Siete
Year	Award	Category	Recipient	Result	Ref.
2007	21st PMPC Star Awards for Television	Best Daytime Drama Series	Daisy Siete	Nominated	
