= Rochelle Pangilinan =

Filipino actress and dancer (born 1982)

- Born: Rochelle Pangilinan; May 23, 1982 (age 44); Malabon, Philippines
- Occupations: Actress; dancer; singer
- Years active: 1995–present
- Agent: Sparkle (2024–present)
- Spouse: Arthur Solinap (m. 2017)
- Children: 1
- Musical career
- Genres: P-pop; rap; dance
- Instrument: Vocals
- Label: Panacea
- Formerly of: SexBomb Girls

Rochelle Pangilinan-Solinap (born May 23, 1982) is a Filipino actress, dancer and singer. She began her career as one of the original members of the SexBomb Girls, who gained prominence through the variety show Eat Bulaga!. She later appeared in television programs, most notably in Daisy Siete, and portrayed Agane in the 2016 fantasy drama series Encantadia. In 2007, she briefly rebranded as a rap artist under the name RoC.

== Personal life ==
During her childhood, Pangilinan lived in Barangay Dampalit, Malabon, a flood-prone area in the Philippines. She did not attend college. Her father died of emphysema in 2007.

Pangilinan married actor Arthur Solinap on August 8, 2017. She gave birth to their daughter, Shiloh Jayne on February 24, 2019, by an emergency C-section.

== Career ==
=== Dancing career ===
Pangilinan was still a student when she began joining barangay dance contests and television competitions, such as Eat Bulaga!. There, Pangilinan met Joy Cancio, her cousin's trainer, who gave her a calling card and invited her to attend dance training sessions. Cancio personally trained Pangilinan and hired professional instructors to further develop their skills. After two to three years of training and performing in off-network shows, they became the official house dancers of Eat Bulaga! as the SexBomb Girls and she became the leader of the group. In 2003, they released their hit track, "The Spaghetti Song."

On June 3, 2007, Pangilinan introduced herself as RoC and launched her debut album Roc-A-Holic (released on June 8, 2007, by Panacea Music) on the weekly variety show, SOP Rules. The album consists of catchy rap, hip hop-flavored and Latin-inspired songs, with the carrier single "Baile".

=== Acting career ===
Pangilinan began her acting career with a main role in the television drama series Daisy Siete on GMA Network, alongside the SexBomb Girls. She later appeared in ABS-CBN's sitcom Home Along Da Airport with Dolphy. In 2005, Pangilinan played Corella, a mermaid ally of Darna, in the drama Darna. In 2009, she returned to the rebooted Darna as the antagonist Deborah, also known as Babaeng Manananggal. Pangilinan later portrayed Marikit, a lead character in the historical drama Amaya. In 2016, she played the villain Agane in the reboot of drama Encantadia, serving as the right hand of Hagorn, the king of Hathoria, portrayed by John Arcilla.

In 2024, Pangilinan was cast as a comfort woman in the war drama Pulang Araw. Her performance received acclaim and earned her the Best Primetime Supporting Actress award at the 10th Platinum Stallion National Media Awards, marking her first acting trophy. In 2025, she won the best supporting actress award at Cinemalaya for her role in Child No. 82: Anak ni Boy Kana.

In the following year, she replicated this by winning the same award for the same film during the 9th Entertainment Editors' Choice awards.

== Discography ==
=== Albums ===
with SexBomb Girls:

- 2002: Unang Putok (4× Platinum)
- 2003: Round 2 (5× Platinum)
- 2004: Bomb Thr3at (2× Platinum)
- 2005: Sumayaw, Sumunod: The Best of the Sexbomb Girls (Platinum)
- 2006: Daisy Siete V-Day
- 2008: Vaklushii

Solo albums:

- 2007: Roc-A-Holic

== Filmography ==
=== Film ===
Year	Title	Role
2002	Bakit Papa?	
2003	Bertud ng Putik	Karina Fernandez
2003	Fantastic Man	
2014	Asintado	Lirio
2015	Tandem	Cha
2016	Bumulakabataan...Bulalakaw Waves	Sexy Dancer at Bar
2016	Fruits N' Vegetables: Mga Bulakboleros	University Lady Guard
2017	Trip Ubusan: The Lolas vs. Zombies	Ivy
2022	Labyu with an Accent	Daisy Santos
2025	Child No. 82: Anak ni Boy Kana	Alicia Garcia

=== Television ===
Year	Title	Role	Note(s)
1997–1999	Esperanza	Eliza	
1999–2011	Eat Bulaga!	Herself (performer)	
2003–2010	Daisy Siete	Rochelle	
2003	Magpakailanman	Juliet Sunot	
2005	Darna	Corella	
2007–2010	SOP	Herself (performer)	
2008	Kung Ako Ikaw	Herself	
2009	Adik Sa'Yo	Herself	
2009–2010	Darna	Deborah Santos / Babaeng Manananggal	
2009–2011	Show Me Da Manny	Maria Juana "Rihanna" Balbaqua	
2010	Diva	Kelly Salvador / Fake Sampaguita "Sam" Fernandez	
2010	Ilumina	Elena	
2010–2013	Party Pilipinas	Herself (performer)	
2011–2012	Amaya	Bai Marikit	
2012	Broken Vow	Rebecca Sta. Maria	
2013–2023	Magpakailanman	Ivy Sese	Episode: "Kagat ng Asong Ulol"
2013–2023	Magpakailanman	Anna	Episode: "Misis vs Beki"
2013–2023	Magpakailanman	Elaine	Episode: "Isang Mister, Limang Asawa"
2013–2023	Magpakailanman	Lucy	Episode: "Pinay in the Happiest Place in the World"
2013–2023	Magpakailanman	Anjo	Episode: "Tatay ng Lansangan"
2013–2023	Magpakailanman	Emily	Episode: "Krimen ng Isang Ina"
2013–2023	Magpakailanman	Terry	Episode: "Reyna ng Tahanan"
2013–2023	Magpakailanman	Terry	Episode: "Ronda ng Kalsada"
2013	Sunday All Stars	Herself (performer)	
2013	Home Sweet Home	Wendy Del Valle	
2013	Anak Ko 'Yan	Herself / Dance Coach	
2014	Carmela	Yolanda "Yolly" Montesilva	
2014–2015	Ang Lihim ni Annasandra	Esmeralda Salvador	
2014	Elemento	Ma-yi	Episode: "Apoy ni Bambolito"
2015	Once Upon a Kiss	Rapunzel Pelaez-Almario	
2015	Maynila	Jasmine	Episode: "NoUTurn"
2015	The Half Sisters	Stella Antonio-Valdicañas	
2016	Wish I May	Audrey Ramos	
2016	Wagas	Patricia Javier	Episode role
2016–2017	Encantadia	Agane / Andora	
2017	Wish Ko Lang!	Jane	Episode role
2017	Road Trip	Herself (guest)	
2017–2020	Tadhana	Donna	Episode: "Dream House"
2017–2020	Tadhana	Aileen	Episode: "Pilit na Pag-ibig"
2017–2020	Tadhana	Evelyn	Episode: "Positive"
2017–2020	Tadhana	Daria	Episode: "Hindi Pa Huli Ang Umibig"
2017	Dear Uge	Various roles	Episode role
2017	Alyas Robin Hood	Diana dela Vega	
2018–2019	Onanay	Sally del Mundo	
2019–2020	The Gift	Francine Delgado	
2022	False Positive	Bernice Siodora	
2022; 2025	Lolong	Karina Marabe	
2023	Mga Lihim ni Urduja	Dayang Salaknib	
2023	Open 24/7	Konsihala	
2024	Pulang Araw	Amalia Dimalanta-Torres	
2024–2025	It's Showtime	Herself (guest performer)	
2025–2026	Encantadia Chronicles: Sang'gre	Agane	Reprising role

== Awards and nominations ==
Year	Award	Category	Nominated Work	Result
2012	26th PMPC Star Awards for TV	Best Drama Actress	Amaya	Nominated
2013	1st Sunday All Stars Awards	Stand Out Season Performer	None	Nominated
2013	1st Sunday All Stars Awards	Stand Out Dancer	None	Won
2015	2015 Metro Manila Film Festival	New Wave Best Supporting Actress	Tandem	Nominated
2016	32nd PMPC Star Awards for Movies	Movie Supporting Actress of the Year	Tandem	Nominated
2017	31st PMPC Star Awards for Television	Best Single Performance by an Actress	Karelasyon: My Brother's Dark Secret	Nominated
2025	10th Platinum Stallion National Media Awards	Best Primetime Supporting Actress	Pulang Araw	Won
2025	38th PMPC Star Awards for Television	Best Drama Supporting Actress	Pulang Araw	Nominated
2025	37th PMPC Star Awards for Television	Best Single Performance by an Actress	Magpakailanman: The Abused Teacher	Won
2025	2025 Cinemalaya	Best Supporting Actress	Child No. 82: Anak ni Boy Kana	Won

Preceded by Erika Padilla	FHM Cover Girl (July 2014)	Succeeded by Beauty Gonzalez
