= Isko Salvador =

Filipino comedy writer and actor

- Born: Herman Salvador Jr. May 21, 1958 (age 68); Calumpit, Bulacan, Philippines
- Other name: Brod Pete
- Occupations: Actor; comedian
- Years active: 1979–present
- Known for: Ang Dating Doon
- Website: Brod Pete's official Facebook fanpage

Herman "Isko" Salvador Jr. (born May 21, 1958), also known as Brod Pete, is a Filipino actor and comedian. He is known for his "Ang Dating Doon" parody segment in the comedy show Bubble Gang, as a host of Celebrity Bluff, and his frequent use of the word "alien".

== Early life and education ==
Herman Salvador was born in the municipality of Calumpit, Bulacan, Philippines. He graduated from the University of Santo Tomas in 1980 with a Bachelor of Communication Arts. He has mentioned that his idol is Dolphy, a Filipino comedian.

== Career ==
Salvador started his career as a scriptwriter. He began writing gags in the early 1980s. In the 1980s he was a comedy writer for the Philippine's longest-running comedy sitcom, John en Marsha, in which he also played a character named Iskô – giving rise to his stage name. After that sitcom ended, he wrote for other shows, including Plaza 1899, Home Along Da Riles, Champoy, Going Bananas, and Buddy en Sol.

=== Brod Pete ===
Salvador became a head writer for the Bubble Gang TV show in the 1990s. He achieved prominence for a segment he wrote for the show, "Ang Dating Doon", a parody religion based on the popular late-1990s Philippine religious program Ang Dating Daan (The Old Path). Salvador as Brod Pete would caricature televangelist Eliseo Soriano, as he with his co-actors Cesar Cosme (as Brother Willy) and Chito Francisco (as Brother Jocel) quoted English fairy tales and Tagalog nursery rhymes in place of religious scripture. The audience was promoted to join in a "fanatical chanting" of "Alien" instead of "Amen". Salvador's "Brod Pete" persona is a name pun on American actor Brad Pitt, as the latter's name is prone to mispronunciation with a thick Filipino accent.

In the 2007 version, the sketch was called "Doon Dati" or "Du'n Dati". In 2011 the sketch was renamed "Ang Bagong Dating Doon", focusing on questions or opinions from the other Bubble Gang cast members and fans on social media. The hosts answer the questions through song lyrics that are meanwhile being reinterpreted by Brod Pete in a more humorous way.

Salvador has also appeared as Brod Pete in various films and television shows, including Boy Pick-Up: The Movie, Pidol's Wonderland, Mr. Suave: Hoy! Hoy! Hoy! Hoy! Hoy! Hoy!, Nobody Nobody But Juan, and Klasmeyts. His Brod Pete character anchors a talk radio show, The Saturday 3 p.m. Habit with Brod Pete, on which he responds to call-in queries with wacky answers, and is a paid celebrity endorser for the Pollen-B line of health supplements.

=== Celebrity Bluff ===
Salvador is a former host of Celebrity Bluff, a Philippine game show. His role is the gangnam and his job is to help the contestants answer questions shown on the board.

=== Other credits ===
Salvador has also appeared in various sitcoms, gag shows, and films. His credits include the television shows Kapitan Awesome, John en Shirley, Love Spell, Daboy en da girl, Lastikman, Most Wanted, and the Yes! Yes! Show.

=== 5-Minute Brod Pete Show ===
In September 2015, Isko Salvador launched his own online show, the 5-Minute Brod Pete Show or stylized as #5MBPS. It runs 5 minutes from Monday to Friday, and features various segments such as Internet memes, phone callers, current events, commentary, spoofs, challenges, and Q&A.

=== #BASA ===
In 2016, PSICOM Publishing Inc. published Salvador's first book "#BASA". The book contained witty gags and jokes of the comedian himself. Spoofs and scenes from his online show 5-Minute Brod Pete Show are in the book as well.

== Filmography ==
=== Television ===
Year	Title	Role
1987–1991	John en Marsha	Isko
1998–2016	Bubble Gang	Himself
1999–2010	SOP	Himself / Guest
2000	GMA Telecine Specials	Himself
2000–2001	Kiss Muna	Kak
2001	Kakabakaba	
2002	Daboy en Da Girl	Chief Lobatt
2003	Daddy Di Do Du	Guest
2004	Maynila	Various
2004	Yes, Yes Show!	Various
2005	Quizon Avenue	Various
2006	John en Shirley	Various
2007	Love Spell Presents	Various
2007	Ispup	Various
2007	Ka-PETE Na!: Totally Outrageous Behavior	Himself / Host
2007–2008	Lastikman	
2008	Matanglawin	Himself / Guest
2009–2010	Lokomoko	Various
2009	Fulhaus	Various
2010	Show Me Da Manny	Himself / Guest
2010	Party Pilipinas	Himself / Guest
2010	Pepito Manaloto	Himself / Guest
2010	Pidol's Wonderland	Samson
2011	Star Confessions: The Richie Da Horsie Story	Bossing Vic Sotto
2012	Pidol's Wonderland	Various
2012	It's Showtime	Story Teller & Celebrity Judge
2012	Kapitan Awesome	SPO Toto
2013–present	The Saturday 3 p.m. Habit (Radio)	
2013–2016; 2017–2018	Celebrity Bluff	Himself / Gangnam
2013–2015	Sunday All Stars	Himself / Guest
2014	Vampire ang Daddy Ko	Various
2014	AHA!	Himself / Guest
2015	Ismol Family	Himself / Guest
2015	Sabado Badoo	Himself / Guest
2015	Juan Tamad	Guest
2016	Lip Sync Battle Philippines	Himself / Guest
2016	Tanods	Capt. Engelbert Murphy
	Sunday PinaSaya	Himself / Guest
2018	I Can See Your Voice	Himself / Guest Sing-vestigator
2019	Daddy's Gurl	Various
2019	Minute to Win It: Last Man Standing	Himself / Guest Player
2020	All-Out Sundays	Himself / Guest
2020	Mars Pa More	Himself / Guest
2023	Happy Together	Mang Mario
2024	I Luv Pets	Isko
2026	Bravo Executive Lounge	Guest

=== Film ===
Year	Title	Role	Note(s)	Ref(s).
1986	Cobrador	Himself		
1988	Ompong Galapong: May Ulo, Walang Tapon		Credited as "Isko"	
2000	Most Wanted	Santos		
2000	Kahit Pito ang Buhay Mo			
2000	Mr. Suave: Hoy! Hoy! Hoy! Hoy! Hoy! Hoy!	Mr. Tea		
2006	Lagot Ka sa Kuya Ko	Himself		
2012	Boy Pick-Up: The Movie	Himself		
2013	Boy Golden: Shoot to Kill	Gil		
2022	Tuloy... Bukas ang Pinto	Father Timothy		

=== Screenwriter ===
- 1 for 3 (1997)
