= List of Bubble Gang recurring characters and sketches =

The following describes many of the more noteworthy recurring segments and characters on GMA Network's gag show Bubble Gang.

== Recurring segments ==
Segment	Years aired	Description
Bubble Gags	1995–2022	A segment where various casts of the show throw jokes about a certain situation on each other. Each gag would end up with the surprised faces of the cast/s. This was replaced by Pak Pak Shorts in 2022.
Paksiw: GNA Headline Balita/Paksiw	1996-1998, 1999-2004	Parody of GMA Network's primetime newscast Saksi. The word paksiw refers to a Filipino dish.
Faxmimar de Amor	1996	Parody of the Mexican telenovela Marimar.
Bisperas de Color de Rosas (lit. 'Eve of the Color of Roses')	1996	Parody of the Mexican telenovela Agujetas de color de rosa (lit. 'Pink Shoe Laces'), the first Mexican telenovela to air on GMA on the same that year.
Commercial Spoofs	1996–2018, 2024–present	Parodies of commercial advertisements. The segment mostly features Michael V. and Diego Llorico. Ogie Alcasid was also a regular on this segment until his departure from the show in 2013.
MEV (Miyusik English Versiyon)	1997–2000	Michael V's parody of popular Tagalog songs translated to English in a literal way. The songs were later compiled into an album of the same name in 1997.
MTB (Miyusik Tagalog Bersiyon)	1997–2000	Michael V.'s parody of popular English songs translated to Tagalog in a literal and often humorous manner. The songs were later compiled into an album of the same name in 1998.
Ang Dating Doon (lit. 'What Used to be There')	1998–2002, 2007, 2011–2015, 2025–present	A parody of a popular religious program, Ang Dating Daan (lit. 'The Old Path'), interpreting fairy tales and children's literature instead of religious scriptures. The sketch was hosted by Isko Salvador as Brod Pete, Cesar Cosme as Bro. Willy and Chito Francisco as Bro. Jocel. In the 2007 version, the sketch was called "Doon Dati" or "Du'n Dati" (lit. 'Used to be There'), with Ara Mina as Kapatid (lit. 'Brother/Sister/Sibling') na Rosa, Wendell Ramos as Kapatid na Mel, Ogie Alcasid as Kapatid na Toto, and Michael V as Kapatid na Auring as hosts. "Du'n Dati" is a parody of Iglesia Ni Cristo's "Ang Mga Nagsi-alis sa Samahang Ang Dating Daan" (lit. 'Those Who Left the Old Path'). There is a running gag that Kapatid na Auring answers "wala" (lit. 'none') every time she is asked by Kapatid na Toto if there are any additional comments to the topic being discussed. (see below) From 2011 onwards, the sketch has been renamed "Ang Bagong Dating Doon" (lit. 'The New What Used to be There') (later "Ang Bagong Dating Doon International") (lit. 'The New What Used to be There International'), focusing on questions or opinions from the other Bubble Gang cast members (and later "foreign" guests) and through social media sites, answering them by the hosts through song lyrics, meanwhile being interpreted by Brod Pete in a more humorous way. The sketch incorporates new technologies by using MacBook laptops and iPads as reference materials, being shown using Facebook as references and sometimes playing games, most notably Temple Run. From 2025 onwards, the sketch returned with Cesar Cosme and Chito Francisco reprising their roles as Bro. Willy and Bro. Jocel, respectively. They were joined by Kokoy de Santos as Cong. Kikoy (a parody of Kiko Barzaga), who replaced Salvador.
Hayop Man ay Tao Rin (lit. 'Even Animals are also People')	1998–2004; 2015; 2020	A debate of two animals in the Chinese zodiac (most notably in Chinese New Year) whether if it is the Year of the Goat or the Year of the Sheep (2015 reincarnation). The skit briefly returned in 2020 with the appearance of a bat which made reference to the rumors of the origins of the COVID-19 pandemic.
Horrorscope	1998-2004	Michael V acts as Madam Rocha, a psychic who tells horoscopes, but with a ridiculously twist. She has two white crystal balls, instead of one, in front of her, and only stops making hand movements (like that of a real crystal ball) if "she" sees the viewer "face-to-face".
Lito's Night of Music	1998-2004	Lito (Michael V.) performs classical world songs with Ogie Alcasid playing the piano. The title is a parody of a defunct GMA musical show "A Little Night of Music."
Di Ba Ate with Mare at Panget (lit. 'Isn't it Right, Older Sister, with Sister and Ugly')	1998-2004	Parody of the network's debate show, Debate with Mare at Pare (lit. 'Debate with Sister and Brother'). It is hosted by Diego Llorico and Mykah.
Iskulto Finish	1998-2000	Ogie Alcasid acts as Prof. Ben in Black, who teaches bizarre word patterns.
Super Masa	1998-2000	A superhero loosely based on former President Joseph Estrada. His power comes from a bread he'd made. Masa is a Filipino word for the "masses" or the common people. The word was used in his presidential campaign in 1998 (Erap para sa Masa/Erap for the Masses). The word also means knead if used as a noun.
Remember Wen	1998–2005	Hosted by Evilyn Magpayo (Ate Ebs for short). Based on ABS-CBN's Maalaala Mo Kaya (lit. 'Do You Remember?') and GMA's Magpakailanman (lit. 'Forevermore'). It was replaced by the sketch Tita Herminigilda.
Tips Ahoy!	1998-2006	Ogie Alcasid hosts this segment, showing his viewers how to handle different situations from the mundane to the important, such as being late for work and preventing electrocution while in the shower.
Chinese Angels	1999-2003	Parody of the American crime drama franchise Charlie's Angels.
Taiko	1999	Parody of the famous workout Tae-Bo.
Rosaminda: Advanced Edition	2000	A parody of the Mexican telenovela Rosalinda.
Unang Sirit (lit. 'First Quitting')	2001	A parody of GMA Network's longtime morning show Unang Hirit (lit. 'First Strike'). Michael V plays Arnold Labyo (parody of Arnold Clavio), and it features his sidekick puppet, Arf-Arf (parody of Arn-Arn). In a February 9, 2001 episode, Arn-Arn was featured as a guest co-host, replacing the segment's host Arf-Arf.
Ortigas vs. Mendiola	2001-2003	
RAMPAGE: GUlat ni Bel Chionglo/Chiongco (lit. 'RAMPAGE: Shock by Bel Chionglo/Chiongco')	2001–2004	Spoof of GMA Network's defunct newscast, Frontpage: Ulat ni Mel Tiangco, Rufa Mae Quinto plays Bel Chionglo (parody of Mel Tiangco), among its running gags were Tiongco's opening line "Tsismis bukas, ngayon ang broadcast" (lit. 'Gossip tomorrow, broadcast now') and her expressing surprise after saying "Bel Chionglo po, nag-gugulat" (lit. 'Bel Chionglo, shocked'), a pun on the words ulat (lit. 'report') and gulat (lit. 'shock'). One of its logos in 2003 has a similar design to Frontpage since it was in use from 2002 to 2003.
JR ang Batang Kumag (later retitled as JR Kumag)	2001–02, 2006	A skit about a mischievous and hyperactive kid named Junior (Michael V.) who causes a lot of distress towards his parents (portrayed by Ogie Alcasid and Ara Mina) in different occasions. The word kumag means "idiot".
Pusoy Betty, La Kea (lit. 'Love Betty, a Guy')	2002–2003	A parody of a popular Colombian telenovela Yo soy Betty, la fea (lit. 'I am Betty, the ugly one'), originally aired on GMA. The character Betty/Berto, portrayed by Michael V., is a spoof of Beatriz ‘Betty’ Aurora Pinzón Solano. In this version, Betty/Berto is depicted as an unattractive gay employee hired as a manager at Yeko Moda, a parody of the fashion company Eco Moda. The sketch also introduces her love interest, Sir Armando (a parody of Armando Mendoza Sáenz), portrayed by Wendell Ramos. In the finale episode, Sir Armando and Betty are set to marry. However, Nicolas (portrayed by Antonio Aquitania) and Marcela (portrayed by Ara Mina), attempted to stop the wedding after presenting evidence that Betty is not a cisgender woman, arguing that the marriage should not proceed and he should marry Marcela instead. Sir Armando (later voiced by Rufa Mae Quinto), then reveals to Marcela that he is a transgender man. Despite the revelation, Sir Armando ultimately decides to continue their wedding with Betty.
Tsismis: Chanice and Chelli (lit. 'Gossip: Chanice and Chelli')	2002–2003	Parody of Sis: Janice & Gelli. Michael V. and Ogie Alcasid portray the sisters Chanice and Chelli, a parody of Janice and Gelli de Belen. The sketch typically features parodied versions of Kapuso actors and actresses as guests, with episodes often culminating in quarrels between the sisters and, at times, involving their guests as well.
Gabi ng Galing	2002–2003	
Baklitang K (lit. 'Gay News K')	2002	Parody of the news and current affairs magazine show Balitang K.
Sine Sinta Kita (lit. 'I Cinema Love You') (formerly Box Office Okray (BOO)) (lit. 'Box Office Critique')	2002	A sketch shown during or after the Metro Manila Film Festival in which they criticize all the film entries for that year.
Wish Ku Lang!	2002	A parody of Wish Ko Lang (lit. 'I Only Wish'). The title itself was also a pun word meaning "not much wishes granted!". Michael V played the role of Imbyernadette Soprano, a parody of Bernadette Sembrano, the original host of Wish Ko Lang from 2002 to 2004.
Imbentirador/Imbalsamador (lit. 'portmanteau of Inventor and Sharpshooter/Embalmer')	2002	A parody of the GMA Network documentary show Imbestigador (lit. 'Investigator'). Hosted by Michael Ricketts (played by Michael V., parody of Mike Enriquez).
Yours Truly, Junee Lee	2002–04	An interview segment hosted by Junee Lee (a fictional character played by Michael V.). The segment spun off a talk show entitled Celebrity Turns with Junee and Lani.
GNA Splash Report	2002–05	Spoof of GMA Network's hourly news update, GMA Flash Report. Before and after the segment, they splash water to the anchorman, Ivan Submarina, a parody of GMA newscaster Ivan Mayrina.
Yabang o Panget (lit. 'Pride or Ugly')	2002–06	Parody of Eat Bulaga's defunct game segment Laban o Bawi (lit. 'Fight or Flight'). Ogie Alcasid was the host of the sketch, but no one wins the question in the end.
Muchas Grasas (lit. 'Much Grease')	2003–05, 2007	This skit is about the family of Taong Grasa, a term describing homeless people living in abject poverty, in which they were "high-class" family by talking in English and they proved that the rich people are "low-class" and filthy (in contrast).
Magpa K Man Lang (lit. 'Even if it only reaches K')	2003	A parody of Magpakailanman (lit. 'Forevermore'). Rufa Mae Quinto portrayed as Bel Chiongco, a parody of Mel Tiangco. During the intro and outro of the first edition of the skit, Ogie Alcasid, portrayed as a parody of Wency Cornejo, is shown singing a parody of the theme song.
Ex-Men 3	2003	A parody of a movie X-Men 2.
Kung Mawawala Ka sa Bubble Gang (lit. 'If You Will Be Gone on Bubble Gang')	2003	A skit that parodies every GMA's primetime dramas at that time such as Kung Mawawala Ka and Sana ay Ikaw na Nga as well as Asian dramas that were aired on the same network such as Lavender. It features Ogie Alcasid and Michael V interacting to a character from the said shows in an actual footage of the episode, mostly talking to them over the phone.
Sana ay Ikaw Na Nga sa Bubble Gang (lit. 'It Might Be You on Bubble Gang')	2003	A skit that parodies every GMA's primetime dramas at that time such as Kung Mawawala Ka and Sana ay Ikaw na Nga as well as Asian dramas that were aired on the same network such as Lavender. It features Ogie Alcasid and Michael V interacting to a character from the said shows in an actual footage of the episode, mostly talking to them over the phone.
Lavender sa Bubble Gang (lit. 'Lavender on Bubble Gang')	2003	A skit that parodies every GMA's primetime dramas at that time such as Kung Mawawala Ka and Sana ay Ikaw na Nga as well as Asian dramas that were aired on the same network such as Lavender. It features Ogie Alcasid and Michael V interacting to a character from the said shows in an actual footage of the episode, mostly talking to them over the phone.
Diskubre Channel	2003	Parody of a cable channel, Discovery Channel.
Starsborn	2003	Parody of the GMA talent show StarStruck. There is a running gag that no one gets eliminated during the sketch and new contestants were added to the competition instead. Hence the slogan: Dream, Believe, Multiply which is a parody of the actual show's slogan, Dream, Believe, Survive. The sketch only aired during the original counterpart's first season. The sketch a pun on the phrase "A star is born".
4 Oras (lit. '4 Hours')	2004–2007, 2021	A parody of GMA Network's primetime newscast, 24 Oras (lit. '24 Hours'). Michael V plays Michael Ricketts (parody of Mike Enriquez), Rufa Mae Quinto plays Bel Tiongco (parody of Mel Tiangco), and Ogie Alcasid as Papaya Guano (parody of Pia Guanio). In 2006, 24 Oras anchor Mike Enriquez guest-starred in a sketch with Ricketts and Bahay Mo Ba 'To? character Mang Enriquez. Also in the same year, during its crossover episode with Extra Challenge, Paolo Bediones and Ethel Booba are guest-starred in the same sketch as both played Michael Ricketts and Bel Tiongco, while Ogie Alcasid portrayed Papaya Guano, respectively. In 2021, the skit was briefly revived. Denise Barbacena portrays Michael Ricketts, Bel Tiongco, Becky Corales (parody of Vicky Morales), and Iya Bilina-Arelleno (parody of Iya Villania-Arellano).
Pambansang Panggulo (lit. 'National Troublemaker')	2004	A recurring sketch focusing on Ongpong Dela Cruz's campaign for the 2004 Philippine presidential elections. The word panggulo is a pun on the word pangulo (lit. 'President').
Marilawin	2004–2005	A spoof combination of Marinara and Mulawin, both defunct telefantasy series of GMA Network, and Marina from ABS-CBN. It is about a gay half-mermaid, half-Mulawin named Marilawin who is a son of a mermaid and a Mulawin. He has his human form in which he has a male upper body and female lower body, thus, he has always seen dancing using his hips (due to the fact that the woman's movements were gentler and more graceful than that of a man, and that his lower body was from a woman).
Channel [B]	2004–2005	A parody of the now defunct 24-hour music channel Channel V. It features a video jockey named BJ San Pedro (portrayed by Ogie Alcasid), showcasing Top 3 parody music videos but with the use of an actual songs.
Ang Bagong "Diks" (lit. 'The New "Diks"', short for "Dictionary")	2004–2007; 2022–present	Features portmanteaus of English and Tagalog words applicable to everyday Filipino culture.
OPM Parodies	2005–09; 2017–2019; 2022–present	Music video parodies of popular Filipino artists and bands. The song lyrics are usually composed by Michael V. Some notable spoofs are: Mamaw (lit. 'Monster') by Kayo Kasi Eh! (Narda by Kamikazee) from Darna. Features Diego Llorico and it talks about an ugly man making advances to others.; Ulam (lit. 'Meal') by Douche (Ulan (lit. 'Rain') by Cueshe). Features leftovers.; Di Na Magigisa (lit. 'No More Sautéing') by "'Regine' (ang bilas ko (lit. 'wife of my brother-in-law'))" (Di Ka Nag-iisa (lit. 'You're Not Alone') by Regine Velasquez) from Darna. Talks about sautéing (gisa).; Chaka Nya (lit. 'He's Ugly') by 'Churang Cuneta (Sa Kanya (lit. 'To Him') by Sharon Cuneta) from Attic Cat. Talks about a person expressing frustration towards someone they find unattractive. Features Diego Llorico.; Wag Na Wag (lit. 'Don't Ever') by Kitchie Na Day (Wag na Wag Mong Sasabihin (lit. 'Don't Ever Say') by Kitchie Nadal) from ABS-CBN's hit acquired K-drama program Lovers in Paris. Set at band rehearsal, Kitchie is mauled by her backing band (along with one fan), at the end. Featured a doll keychain as a mock promotion.; Isaw Nga by Shout Boarders (Ikaw Nga by South Border) from Mulawin. Set in a barbecue stand, eating isaw (barbecued chicken intestines).; Don Don by Shame Rock (Hold On by Shamrock) from Jumong. Features Diego Llorico.; May BO Na Ako (lit. 'I Now Have BO') by Shame Rock (Nandito Lang Ako (lit. 'I'm Just Here') by Shamrock) from Captain Barbell. Talks about a person/superhero named Captain Gargle with body odor.; Mas Tanga 'ko Sa'yo (lit. 'I'm More Stupid Than You') by Rey Bolero (Pangako Sa'yo (lit. 'Promise To You') by Rey Valera) from ABS-CBN's drama with the same title of the song. Features about regrets after marriage. Features Diego Llorico. In an anniversary concert, Rey Valera sang this song together with Rey Bolero.; Kung Kailangan Mo Bato(?) (lit. 'If You Need a Rock(?)') by Rey Bolero (Kung Sa Sandaling Kailangan Mo Ako (lit. 'If Ever You Need Me'), also by Rey Valera). Talks about the struggles and consequences of drug addiction, using "bato" (a slang term for drugs) as a metaphor for escape and the destructive impact it has on relationships and well-being. In an anniversary concert, Rey Valera sang this song but beats Rey Bolero with his guitar due to the latter's interference.; Hala Pack-Up (lit. 'Oh, Pack-Up') by Eraseyourheads (Alapaap (lit. 'Cloud') by Eraserheads). It talks about a real-life incident during an Eraserheads reunion concert, where some former members were absent.; Takubets (lit. 'Toilet') by Eh Gago (Tara Let's (lit. 'Let's Go') by Imago). Talks about finding an unoccupied toilet room while feeling defecated in the middle of the area.; Sabog Sabog Tayo (lit. 'Explode Together') (Sabay Sabay Tayo (lit. 'Go Together') by Marian Rivera). Talks about loss of control and chaotic behavior after experimenting with substances due to peer pressure.; Walang Tulog Buong Gabi (lit. 'Sleepless All Night') by Rico J. Pasimuno and Some Girl (Magkasuyo Buong Gabi (lit. 'Making Love All Night') by Rico J. Puno and Elisa Chan). Talks about the struggles of an exhausted entertainer hustling through non-stop gigs all night, hoping for a chance to rest.; Most of the above songs are featured in Michael V.'s album, Michael V.: The Bubble G. Anthology.: Tinda (lit. 'Sell') by FUD (Sila (lit. 'Them') by SUD). Talks about poorly-prepared taho.; Gayahin Mo Sila (lit. 'Imitate Them') by Class B Tayo (lit. 'We're Class B') (Hayaan Mo Sila (lit. 'Leave Them Alone') by Ex Battalion). Talks about copycats. Features Sef Cadayona.; Naman (lit. 'Again') by JK Langpo (a pun of the phrase joke lang po (lit. 'Just a Joke')) (Buwan (lit. 'Moon') by Juan Karlos Labajo). Talks about making an inflammatory social media post about one's sexuality, and acceptance for the LGBT+ community. Features various GMA Network staff who are LGBT+.; Uh-Oh! by Ay Karma Yan! (lit. 'Oh That's Karma') (Oo by Up Dharma Down). Talks about cooking without a stove.; Gusto Ko Nang Bumigay (lit. 'I Want To Give Way') by Morichette (Gusto Ko Nang Bumitaw (lit. 'I Want to Quit') by Morissette) from The Broken Marriage Vow. Talks about a middle-aged man who had wanted to come out as gay/queer for a long time.; Oh Wow! by Hilaw (lit. 'Unripe') (Uhaw (lit. 'Thirsty') by Dilaw (lit. 'Yellow')). Talks about content creators and their content on social media. This parody is notable for being recognized by Dilaw, with them performing the song with Michael V. on the November 26, 2023 episode of Bubble Gang.; Waiting Here sa Pila (lit. 'Waiting Here in Line') by Lolo Kanor (Raining in Manila by Lola Amour). Talks about buying expensive coffee as status symbols even when the customer doesn't have much money for anything else. This parody is notable for being recognized by Lola Amour themselves, with them performing the song with Michael V. on the November 19, 2023 episode of Bubble Gang.; Sipilyo (lit. 'Toothbrush') by Sang Kiss Muna (lit. 'One Kiss First') (Pasilyo (lit. 'Aisle') by Sunkissed Lola). Talks about a woman in a wedding event with yellow teeth.; Padabog (lit. 'Angrily') by Disgusta Creep featuring Caddie Charanda (Lagabog (lit. 'Thump ') by Skusta Clee feat. Illest Morena). Talks about a golf player who is having bad luck with the game, and in his frustration, his caddie (portrayed by Chariz Solomon) also gets affected.; Salarin, Salarin (lit. 'Culprit, Culprit') by Bini-B10 (a pun of the word binibitin (lit. 'hanging')) (Salamin, Salamin (lit. 'Mirror, Mirror') by Bini). Talks about the perpetrator of a crime, instilling fear and paranoia as they navigate the uncertainty of being targeted.; Hilaw (lit. 'Unripe') by Yaki (Dilaw (lit. 'Yellow') by Maki). Talks about the proper use and pronunciation of the Filipino language.; Feeling by Tio Nilo feat. Jay-Cool (Sining (lit. 'Art') by Dionela feat. Jay R). Talks about the Titos of Manila. Tio Nilo is portrayed by Michael V., while Jay-Cool is played by Paolo Contis.
Estimador (lit. 'Estimator')	2005	Another parody of the GMA Network documentary show Imbestigador (lit. 'Investigator'). Hosted by Michael Ricketts, the segment is known for its motto, "Hindi namin kayo tatantyahin!" (lit. 'We will not estimate you!') (parody of Imbestigador's tagline, "Hindi namin kayo tatantanan!" (lit. 'We will not stop coming after you'))
Itsura Mo! (lit. 'Your Look')	2005–06	A sketch showing facial expressions on different situations.
Jowa in the Palace (lit. 'Lover in the Palace')	2005–06	Spoof of Korean drama Jewel in the Palace. The story revolves around Jang Kyu, Lady Han Dyob, Lady Pacho Choi, King Gung Gong, and other Dae Jang Geum character parodies.
Pinkantadia and Eateria	2005–06	Parody of GMA Network's Encantadia and Etheria: Ang Ikalimang Kaharian ng Encantadia.
Trip Ko Lang! (lit. 'Just My Trip')	2005–08	Another parody of Wish Ko Lang (lit. 'Just My Wish').
My Name is Kim Sam Son	2006	A parody of the Korean drama My Name is Kim Sam Soon.
Captain Gargle	2006	Parody of Captain Barbell by GMA Network. It features Michael Ricketts, a spoof of Mike Enriquez.
Hi Men Trio	2006	An acoustic duo composed of Ogie Alcasid and Boy2 Quizon. Their songs are composed of poorly-written lyrics either they composed or sent by viewers nationwide.
Baklantika	2006	Gay parody of Atlantika by GMA Network.
Okrah	2006	A parody of Oprah.
Bakokang	2006–07	A parody of GMA Network's Bakekang.
Iyo Tube (lit. 'You Tube')	2007	A parody of the video uploading website YouTube. The sketch features different videos uploaded by certain people, all wearing tube-tops. Regularly, one of five segments play: 1. Francine Prieto and Maureen Larrazabal play two large-chested women who flaunt their beauty, hyping themselves as perfect and unattainable 2. Wendell Ramos and Antonio Aquitania give political commentary in tube-tops where they raise or lower their tops accordingly if they say "upload" or "download" 3. Ogie Alcasid plays "Jun Tukmol" (lit. 'Jun Stupid'), a political activist 4. Diana Zubiri and Michael V. give various commentary, but as a couple with a disheveled appearance 5. Francine and Maureen continue their self-beauty-flaunting. Later replaced by Moymoy Palaboy's lip-synch music videos. In 2011, IyoTube began to spoof the "Talking Twin Babies" video, with Ogie Alcasid & Michael V. playing as the twin babies.
Buwang Jini (lit. 'Crazy Jini')	2007	A parody of KBS Drama Hwang Jin-Yi
Kung Mabawi Man ang Ulam (lit. 'If the Meal is Recovered')	2007	A parody of Sine Novela Presents Kung Mahawi Man Ang Ulap (lit. 'If the cloud dissipates') previously aired on GMA Network (only appeared once).
Sinasampal Kita (lit. 'I Slap You')	2007	A parody of Sine Novela Presents Sinasamba Kita (lit. 'I Worship you') previously aired on GMA Network (only appeared once). It showed cast members Diego Llorico, Valerie Concepcion (guest), and Wendell Ramos. Starts when Diego finds his eyeball partner played by Wendell Ramos, but he spotted Valerie and hugs her while slapping Diego while he mentions 'sinasamba kita' to Valerie while he says 'sinasampal kita' to Diego.
Kunsensya (lit. 'Conscience')	2007	Michael V. plays the conscience of characters leading to different circumstances. This sketch shows Michael V's ability to impersonate his fellow cast members. So far, Antonio Aquitania, Diego Llorico, Mykah, Rufa Mae Quinto, Keempee De Leon, and Ogie Alcasid have been parodied in this sketch.
Maika	2007	A spoof of Majika (only Appeared once).
Mga Tenga Ni Panghelita (lit. 'Panghelita's Ears')	2007	Spoof of primetime GMA Network teleserye Mga Mata ni Anghelita (lit. 'Anghelita's Eyes'). It shows Panghelita, (Michael V.) a deaf-mute. However, she can speak but cannot hear in return doing so.
Paningit (lit. 'Filler')	2007	Francine Prieto explains derivations of Tagalog and English words.
Idakdak Mo (lit. 'Blurt It Out')	2007	Parody of Eat Bulaga's game segment Itaktak Mo (lit. 'Shake It Out') (only appeared once).
Pulis Pang-kalokohan (lit. 'Troublesome Police')	2007	Parody of Zaido: Pulis Pangkalawakan (lit. 'Zaido: Space Police'). This skit is about the two policemen who have a plan to arrest anyone with comical jokes.
Kamandog	2007–08	A parody of GMA Telebabad's Kamandag (lit. 'Venom') and a portmanteau of kamandag and "dog".
Ang Huling El Video (lit. 'The Last El Video')	2008	A short sketch whose title is a parody of the Eraserheads song Ang Huling El Bimbo (lit. 'The Last El Bimbo') which involves a man, portrayed by Michael V. making a suicidal video which ends up in a failure, due to his camera's battery running low as well as interruptions during the video. Regardless, he still succeeded in committing suicide.
Lavandera in the Palace: Pulis Pangkalooban (lit. 'Laundrywoman in the Palace: Police on the Inside')	2008	Combined parody of Zaido: Pulis Pangkalawakan (lit. 'Zaido: Space Police'), La Vendetta, Jewel in the Palace, and Jumong.
Copy Princess	2008	Parody of GMA Network's K-drama program, Coffee Prince. Set in a xerox copy center.
Poor Factor	2008	Parody of American reality show Fear Factor in which the characters are from the Muchas Grasas (lit. 'Much Grease') segment. (Only appeared once)
Gagambala (lit. 'To Disturb')	2008	A parody of GMA's primetime drama Gagambino and Spider-Man. This skit is about a heroic "villain" named Gagambala who attempts to distract people or make mischievous ways on them using his own tambourine. Notable quote: "Ako si Gagambala at gagambalahin ko kayo." (lit. "I'm Gagambala and I'm gonna disturb you.")
Tsimoy Records	2008	A parody of Pinoy Records.
Tulis! Tulis! (lit. 'Sharp! Sharp!')	2008	A parody of TV5 show Pulis! Pulis! (lit. 'Police! Police!').
My Husband's a Woman	2008	A parody of the Korean drama My Husband's Woman, shown on GMA Network in 2008. (Only shown once)
Karton Karakters (lit. 'Cart Characters')	2008	A sketch of normal people living in a house made of carton boxes and personalities wearing carton boxes as their clothing.
Kwarta o Karton (lit. 'Money or Cart')	2008	A parody of the former game show Kwarta o Kahon (lit. 'Money or Box'). (Only shown once)
Family Few	2008	A parody of the game show Family Feud. (Only shown once)
Ang Spoiled (lit. 'The Spoiled')	2008–2009	A little brute named Angelina (Ogie Alcasid) who is bratty and asks different orders from her Yaya (lit. 'Nanny') (Michael V.) Her orders always bring her nanny to the worst. Angelina's notable quotes are "Yaya, you're such a loser!", "Big Deal" and "Whatever" in which she has her own finger gestures (that is, the L; Y, which resembles peace sign; and W finger gestures, which mean Loser, Yaya, and Whatever, respectively). Sketches show Angelina and her yaya in many places, such as in the mall, in school, and elsewhere, but most sketches show them both in Angelina's house, notably inside her room. Angelina's character was inspired by Angelica Pickles of the Nickelodeon TV series Rugrats, while the Yaya was inspired by The Nanny. Yaya's name is revealed in the movie "Yaya & Angelina: The Spoiled Brat Movie" as ChaCha Lucero.
Moymoy Palaboy (second Iyo Tube)	2008–2016	Moymoy Palaboy is a duo that does a webcam performance "singing" local and international hits using their lipsynch acts. The duo was discovered on YouTube, where they have uploaded their webcam videos of Filipino and foreign songs with lipsynch acts. In 2014, the segment was used for XIX 19 B.C. (19th Anniversary) featuring the milestones of the show's past 19 years.
Sumbong Sumbong kay Bonggang Bongbong (Mas Pinabongga) (lit. 'Complain Complain to Flamboyant Bongbong (Made Flamboyant Further)')	2008–2013; 2016–2018; 2022; 2023	A reality investigative program which is an obvious parody of Imbestigador and Bitag. The show is hosted by Bongbong, a gay parody of Ben Tulfo, producer, director, and host of Bitag, as well as his brothers Mon, Raffy and Erwin Tulfo. It focuses on the everyday mannerisms of society, like different people pushing the elevator button many times, calling on the cellular phone while on the escalator, balikbayans talking in exaggerated American English after having only gone for weeks, etc. In the end, they will be hit by a gavel. Even though the segment is a spoof of Bitag itself and its sister program Bitag Live!, it is also a parody of other programs of the Tulfo Brothers, such as Isumbong Mo Kay Tulfo, Wanted and Mission X (now Tutok Tulfo). Bongbong was derived from President Bongbong Marcos. It was succeeded by T3 Nyo! another Tulfo parody. The segment's second incarnation, known as Mas Pinabongga (lit. 'Made Flamboyant Further'), lasted from 2016 to 2018. In 2022, Bongbong came in the Patibong segment known as Patibong-Gang Bonggang Bongbong (lit. 'Flamboyant Bongbong's Flamboyant Trap'). In 2023, the segment was revived for Bente O-Chew (28th Anniversary) special with special guest Kim Atienza
Chikadora D'Exploiter	2008-2010	A parody of Dora the Explorer. Portrayed by Michael V. as Chikadora (spoof of Dora Marquez) and Diego Llorico.
Boxing Trainer/Ang Boxing Coach (lit. 'Boxing Trainer/The Boxing Coach')	2009	A two-part boxing sketch with Michael V as Johnny Santos and Ogie Alcasid as Benjo. In the first episode, Johnny was training for an amateur match in Wildbox Boxing Gym (an obvious parody of Wild Card Boxing Club, a Hollywood Boxing Gym owned by Manny Pacquiao's head trainer Coach Freddie Roach) until he met Benjo, his substitute trainer after finding out that the boxer's coach has flu. During the training, he says several words that Johnny cannot understand such as "himu jaba", which is in fact one of the boxing combination moves. Near the end of the training, Johnny gets upset when his trainer says lots of gibberish and beats Benjo up (which Johnny interpreted as the trainer's orders). In the second part, Ang Boxing Coach, the amateur match between Johnny Santos and Ricky Marcelo (Dennis Trillo) is about to begin. Before the start of the match, Benjo came and told about the bad news that Johnny's trainer has H1N1 (interpreted by Benjo as "Hini") and was hospitalized, and once again, Benjo substituted but Johnny disagreed because of his misunderstood words. Benjo said to forget about it and reconcile, focus on the match, and listen to every move he says. Johnny was doing pretty well until the trainer said: "himu jaba", one of the words Johnny cannot understand (the other two words were "himo dede boobi" and "katumachiku jumama poompoom") which causes the boxer to hold back and knock out by his opponent until he lost after the third knockout. After the fight, Ricky thanked Benjo for his "professional" coaching because of his "simple" words that Johnny cannot understand. In fact, he told Johnny one of the "moves"' real meaning (i.e. Katumachiku jumana poompoom which means Jab, straight, hook, uppercut). The second episode is in fact a parody of the fight between Ricky Hatton and Manny Pacquiao, in which Pacquiao knocked out the British fighter twice in the first round and KO'ed him in the second round. the second episode shows the exact opposite since Ricky Marcello (parody of Ricky Hatton) knocked out Johnny Santos (parody of Manny Pacquiao) in the same sequence in the original fight.
Tio Petto and Panopio	2009	A parody of Mister Geppetto and Pinocchio. As of July 10, 2009, it has shown 7 episodes.
D Moon New	2009	Parody of Twilight's sequel New Moon, starring Ogie Alcasid as Eduardo (a spoof of Edward Cullen), Rufa Mae Quinto as Mella (parody of Bella Swan), Antonio Aquitania as Jacol (parody of Jacob Black) and Michael V. as Daniel, Mella's new love interest who is later revealed to be a married womanizer. Thus, his wife calls him demonyo (demon/devil), hence, the title. Appeared only once and aired exactly one week before Christmas.
Dingga	2010	A parody of Darna with Michael V as Ading, a lame man who, whenever he chews a magical bubble gum, will transform him into a gay superhero named Dingga. The enemies shown in this spoof were also inspired by Darna's early foes as well as a character from Dark Horse Comics, the first of which is Baklang Impakta, which is a parody of Babaeng Impakta and Hellgay, which is the parody of Hellboy.
Haka Haka (Bukakabukaka) (lit. 'Guess (Wide Open)')	2010	A parody of Discovery Channel's science television program MythBusters. Starring Michael V. as Jamie Hyneman and Ogie Alcasid as Adam Savage, they test the validity of various superstitious beliefs of Filipinos.
Ay Witness (lit. 'Oh Witness')	2010	A parody of a GMA Public Affairs late night program, I-Witness.
Pinoy Gago and Pinoy Jenyo (lit. 'Pinoy Idiot')	2010	A parody of Eat Bulaga's most popular game segment, Pinoy Henyo (lit. 'Pinoy Genius').
Don't Etching Me	2010	Parody of Showbiz Central's Don't Lie To Me. It is hosted by Michael V. as Sweat (parody of John "Sweet" Lapus). On February 3, 2012, there is another parody called Don't Die To Me, where instead of using a lie detector, the guest is tortured in order to admit the rumors about him/her.
Padre and Sam (lit. 'Father and Sam')	2010	Parody of ABS-CBN's hit primetime religious drama, May Bukas Pa.
Queen Sang Joke (lit. 'Queen One Joke')	2010	Parody of GMA Koreanovela, Queen Seon Deok.
Rich Kids	2010	A sketch that involves four rich boys portrayed by Michael V., Ogie Alcasid, Boy2 Quizon, and Dennis Trillo, who discuss and complain about people providing needs for the poor and ignoring the rich. Running gag: At the end of each episode, they, along with their rich friends protest by saying "Let's make baka, don't be takot" (lit. 'Let's make cow, don't be afraid') which is a rich version as well as a parody of the protest cry Makibaka, huwag matakot! (lit. 'Join the struggle, don't be afraid!')
Misspelling Gee	2010-2012	A spelling game show (spelling bee) parody where the host gives an English word and mispronounces it, and two students misspell the given words.
TLC (Tender Loving Championship)	2010-2012	Parody of Ultimate Fighting Championship, and its slogan is "Dito Sa TLC, Walang Sakitan at Puro Sarap" (Here at TLC, No pain but Pure Relaxation.) Instead of wrestling, they gave each other Massages.
Bubble Gang Fliptop	2010-2012	Features the Filipino Rappers from Fliptop, the first Filipino Rap Battle League who do rap battles with each other along with the cast. It only has three episodes.
Pinoy Gago (lit. 'Pinoy Idiot')	2010-2012	Parody of Eat Bulaga's game segment Pinoy Henyo (lit. 'Pinoy Genius'). After a man (Michael V.) watched a game show, he decided to practice using a mirror & confetti, but he failed after the timer stopped.
CheChe Bureche	2010-2012	A comic sketch featuring Ogie Alcasid as the kind Cheche (nicknamed "Che") and Michael V. as the mean Bureche (nicknamed "Bure"). Cheche and Bureche are twin sisters living with their father (which was played by Antonio Aquitania). Whenever their father leaves for work, Bureche usually terrorizes Cheche with her vile antics, but usually becomes the victim of her own schemes. As a result, in a running gag, she screams "Aaarrrggghhhh!!!!!". Wendell Ramos plays their love interest, a boy next door with a Justin Bieber-inspired hairdo.
Balitang News	2011–2012	An inter-dialectical spoof newscast in which Tagalog words used are then related into English. The segment is a parody of GTV's noontime news program, Balitanghali. Eleuterio Ignacio (played by Ogie Alcasid), wearing a barong tagalog, is speaking in Tagalog while Electronic Ignition (played by Michael V.), wearing a suit, is speaking in English. These two personalities are both the same in translation (in a literal manner or paraphrases), including their names. They both wear black pants and glasses as well. During Bubble Gang's 16th anniversary, GMA anchors Mike Enriquez and Arnold Clavio guested on the show as the anchors of the skit. The skit's logo is similar to GMA News TV, but its font was Arial Black. For example: "Tatlong magkasunod na delubyo... ang tumama sa Babuyan Islands... Malakas na lindol, malakas na hangin at nasunog pa ang munisipyo (Translated as "Disaster, disaster, disaster...In the Piggery...Earth, Wind and Fire")
Pickup Lines	2011–2013	A reboot of Fliptop in which instead of a rap battle, it is a verbal battle using romantic puns commonly known to Filipinos as "pickup lines." Since this was originated from the Fliptop sketches, the characters still wear hip-hop attire. The Pickup Line Battle is composed of a preliminary round wherein two contestants will try to impress the woman moderator named Neneng Bakit, or simply Neneng B., played by Sam Pinto, using their pickup lines. The winner of the match will be determined by audience impact and moves on to face the "undefeated" Pickup Liner named Boy Pickup, played by Ogie Alcasid. In the end, Boy Pickup, who sometimes shows his trademark Zippo lighter, will remain undefeated, despite the fact that his pickup lines are so deep only a selected few can understand its true meaning. He is being cheered on by one of the audience named Boy Backup (played by Eri Neeman, who is also a writer for the show), which gives Boy Pickup enough audience impact to win the battle. Michael V., meanwhile, plays the role of M.C. Bits, the host of the sketch. Other characters include Bagwis (Dennis Trillo), Pushback (Boy-2 Quizon), Dahon [Antonio Aquitania, who always bring leaves in hand, hence the name. He is Boy Pickup's mortal competitor, and also has a backup guy named Kasuy (Baba-Gee), Sukli (Moymoy Obeso, who always brings coins, hence the name, meaning "change"), and Bagoong (Roadfill Obeso), who never wins even a single pickup battle, hence the name which is a reference to the word "balagoong" meaning always losing. Guest Pickup Liners include Bisugo (Betong Sumaya), who later became a regular; Boy Chicha (Chris Tiu), Reynang B (Regine Velasquez), who promoted her concert with Alcasid called Mr. and Mrs. A, and Pusoy (Paulo Avelino, who later moved to ABS-CBN).
Di Ako Bading (lit. 'I'm Not Gay')	2011	A three-part sketch involves a man portrayed by Michael V. who easily gets upset with people who treat him as gay. Near the end of each episode, he is restrained by his best friend, portrayed by Wendell Ramos.
Dish Ko Lang! (lit. 'Just My Dish')	2011	Another parody of GMA Network's public service program, Wish Ko Lang (lit. 'Just My Wish').
Dan and Serye	2011	Parody of GMA Network's Time of My Life where Michael V & Ogie Alcasid played as Dan & Serye.
D' Adventures of James Wang	2011–2014	An investigative crime sketch which is a parody of the James Bond series and Sherlock Holmes. Jacky Woo played the role as James Wang. There is a running gag that he is always the victim of the schemes he did not commit and often gets arrested for it.
Ba't Ganun? (later Ba't Ganern) (lit. 'Why is it?')	2011-2013; 2022–present	A short sketch involving asking questions about society as well as its mannerisms. For example, Ba't ganun? Hotcake ang tawag kahit malamig na ito? Ba't ganun? (Why is it called hotcake even if it is cold? Why is it?) The segment returned in 2022, now as "Ba't Ganern?".
Coach Calmado (lit. 'Coach Calm')	2012	Formerly known as "Mr. Calmado". A sketch about a disciplined yet overly irate basketball coach (despite his name, although he tries to be as calm as he can) portrayed by Michael V. He is short-tempered and semi-psychotic that he threatens students and other people at schools. At the end of each episode, he nearly strips off some of the faculty members such as referees, teachers, librarians, etc., and destroys the school's materials and facilities every time he compares "disrespectful" students to people who are stripping off other people. He is an obvious parody of MadTV's Coach Hines. It is revealed in the June 29, 2012, episode, Lamay (Wake) that his first name is Hector, which makes his name a play on the famous PBA player Hector Calma.
Daddy Dearest	2012	An obvious parody as well as a teaser for the then-upcoming drama-comedy My Daddy Dearest. The sketch tells about a father (Ogie Alcasid) telling a story to his son about what really happened to the latter's mother (i.e. the former's wife). In between the story-telling, several women kiss "Daddy Dearest" (Alcasid), and afterward "Daddy Dearest" clarifies who they really are.
Makapili Kang Muli (lit. 'To Select You Again')	2012	Parody of the GMA Network's Makapiling Kang Muli (lit. 'To Be With You Again'). Talks about a traitor, a pun for Makapili, Japanese collaborators and sympathizers during World War II.
Di Ka Na Maggigisa (lit. 'You Won't Be Screwed Anymore')	2012	Parody of the GMA Network's afternoon drama, Hindi Ka Na Mag-iisa (lit. 'You Won't Be Alone Anymore')
Lino Blanco	2012	Parody of the GMA Network's drama, Luna Blanca.
ProteJail	2012	Parody of GMA-7's talent show Protege. As the title says, the sketch is a talent show for prisoners. Prisoners may stay in jail if they lose. But if they win, they can be released.
Susi Problems (lit. 'Key Problems')	2012	A parody as well as a teaser for the film Sosy Problems. The cast of the sketch also included Bianca King who was part of the main cast of the said film. The sketch was only about keys. It was shown on December 21, 2012
Job Interview	2012–2019	A short segment that shows a typical initial interview for job applicants. It starts with a boss/interviewer portrayed by Michael V. supposed to conduct an initial interview/exam to an applicant named Mr. San Lazaro portrayed by Diego Llorico. However, a female recruiter shows a questionnaire that is not suitable for a job interview, which is actually a questionnaire of the Filipino culture as well as media references (e.g. What's the World's Number 2 Shampoo? which is a reference to the commercial of Head and Shoulders). So the boss tells the recruiter to change the questionnaire and instead, he (the boss) will ask personality questions for the applicant in essay form.
My Husband's Driver	2013	A parody of the GMA Network's controversial drama, My Husband's Lover.
Baklang Sisiw (lit. 'Gay Chick')	2013	A parody of the GMA-7 drama Mga Basang Sisiw (lit. 'Wet Chicks') which shows the eviction scene of the said drama. Another sketch with the same scene called "Batang Titiw" features Diego and Michael V. with the former having a speech difficulty similar to Cecilio Sasuman.
Adventures of Rufa Mae Kwento	2013	A short sketch about Rufa Mae Quinto sharing stories based on her experience, hence the name which is a parody of her own real name.
Eye Believe	2013	Parody of GMA Network's infotainment show iBilib. Appeared only once.
Rich Kid Poor Kid	2013	A sketch that involves a rich kid (Paolo Contis) and a poor kid (Michael V.) acting in certain situations. Their fathers are portrayed by Antonio Aquitania and Betong respectively.
The Sleep Over Show	2013	A parody of the GMA Network's defunct midnight talk show The Tim Yap Show
Atlit	2013–2022	A short sketch that showed Diego being proud of himself despite the criticisms of other people and always responded "atlit" (which is a parody of the phrase "at least") at the end of the sketch. It was revealed in GMA's documentary program Tunay na Buhay that Diego's segment was not fake and that it was actually a true story.
Ikaw at ang Ina (lit. 'You and the Mother')	2013–2019, 2025	A sketch about a mother named "Donya Ina Moran" (inspired by Mundo Mo'y Akin character Donya Charito) portrayed by Michael V. who dislikes the modern mannerisms and influences of young people, most notably regarding from a current trends in social media sites. She always criticizes her daughter, "Selphie Moran" (later known as Ella Moran in 2025 episode) who is played by Sef Cadayona for what she does. The famous line was "Paki-explain" (Taglish version for Please Explain), and ended with "Labyu" (Love You). In later episodes, Ina Moran has met her match, in the form of her sister named Ate Patty (guested and played by Jaclyn Jose, who previously played Donya Charito from Mundo Mo'y Akin). In the 30th anniversary episode, Ella (formerly known as Selphie) reunites with her best friend Olivia (portrayed by Kokoy de Santos) at a coffee shop. The sketch satirizes modern social media habits, including AI‑edited profile pictures, photographing café food, and eating with bare hands. Ina later arrives to criticize Ella and Olivia’s behavior, particularly Ella’s act of taking food photos despite having previously posted a ‘promise’ to pursue her fitness goals and lose weight. Ella is introduced as her new nickname, replacing the earlier moniker Selphie used in the skit’s initial iterations.
Istambay Sa Looban (lit. 'Loafer Inside')	2013–present	A situational sketch that takes place in a squatters' area (or barangay) which is narrated through song in the tune of Red River Valley. The singers are portrayed by Michael V. (vocals and guitar), Sef Cadayona, and Antonio Aquitania (in guitars). In a running gag, the song would be interrupted by people in the background. In September 2015, due to the popularity of Eat Bulaga's KalyeSerye and AlDub, producers of Bubble Gang decided to continue this sketch by adding a parody of KalyeSerye (lit. 'Street Series') called IstambaySerye (lit. 'Loafer Series'), which stars Juancho Trivino as Alfred and Denise Barbacena as Yaya Badel, forming a parody loveteam of AlDub called "AlBad", and Betong Sumaya as Lolo Nidoro.
Overtime	2014	A parody and a teaser for the then-upcoming 2014 Richard Gutierrez movie of the same title.
Mr. Matapobre (lit. 'Mr. Elitist')	2014	A sketch about a rich man with an Elvis Presley-inspired hairdo portrayed by Michael V. As his name implies, he hates the mannerisms of low-class people. He calls his two bodyguards, Ron and Jojo (portrayed by Paolo Contis and Antonio Aquitania) to investigate on low-class mannerisms involved in the rich man's house and blames his poor butler, Berto (portrayed by Betong). But at the end of the sketch, it is revealed that Mr. Matapobre's daughter, Jennifer (portrayed by Denise Barbacena) is the real culprit (sparing Berto in the process) in which her father cannot accept and tells the viewers that high-class people do not commit low-class mannerisms. One example is this line: Hindi maaring ikaw ang kumain ng cake, dahil... walang mayamang matakaw, magana lang kaming kumain ("You cannot be the one who ate this cake, because... no rich person is greedy, we are just zestful eaters") One exception is during the 19th anniversary special wherein Berto was not spared from being beaten by Ron and Jojo after the houseboy did not allow street children (from the GMA afternoon drama Yagit) who are later revealed to be Mr. Matapobre's nephews and nieces at the end of the special sketch.
Don Cantoni	2014–2021	A mafia-themed sketch which is an obvious parody of Scarface and The Godfather.
Pag-Ibig Hotline (lit. 'Love Hotline')	2014–2015	A scripted reality talk show which is a parody of Love Hotline hosted by Paolo Contis.
T3 Nyo (lit. 'Your T3')	2014–2015	Parody of the TV5 investigative show T3, where Michael V, Paolo Contis and Jan Manual play Daffy, Bearwin and Den Tolpu (reverse of Putol or [lit. 'Cut']), a parody of Raffy, Erwin and Ben Tulfo respectively.
Starpok (lit. 'Starbeat')	2014–2015	Parody of GMA's showbiz talk show, Startalk hosted by Angelo Santos (Antonio Aquitania) who dislikes showbiz-like answers to his questions (since he wants his guests to tell the truth behind the rumors) and beats them up when they answer so.
Tsugi o Chorva (lit. 'Dead or Whatever')	2015–2016	A sketch that involves several captives who intruded on an island where a group of gay cavemen (led by Betong and/or Michael V.) live. Each captive will be asked a riddle or a logical question. If answered correctly, the captive is spared from punishment and is set free. Otherwise, the captive will be asked whether "Tsugi" or "Chorva". If the captive chooses "chorva", the captive is forced to be taken fancy by the cave gay men and is then set free. If the captive chooses "tsugi", it follows the same condition as "chorva". This also happens during the opening or before the closing of the show wherein the segment is reformatted in a daring game format. The sketch then shows the entire cast (in their normal appearances), the game hosted by Michael V. will choose cast members to pick a name from a jar; then the chosen cast member will answer a very difficult question within 3 to 5 seconds. If answered correctly, s/he is safe, otherwise, the cast member will face a consequence with their most feared animals such as spiders, cockroaches, snakes, frogs, worms, etc. blindfolded. Starting October 2015, the questions are based on Bubble Gang's 20th Anniversary (i.e. questions regarding the former cast, sketches, and segments since its premiere in 1995).
May Araw Ka Rin (lit. 'Your Day Will Come')	2015–2016	
Let's Duet!	2015–2016	A situational sketch which involves two men, Rene and Jay portrayed by Michael V. and Betong Sumaya who speak in a form of speech choir. The title is a parody of the Department of Health's (DOH) slogan "Let's DOH it!" by former Secretary Juan Flavier, as well as Eat Bulaga's Just Duet segment, and the show's own slogan "Just Chew It!".
Expectation vs. Reality	2015–2016	A series of scenarios featuring a comparison illustrating an obvious discrepancy. The "Expectation" part shows a positive scenario. Whereas the "Reality" part shows the negative version of the same scenario.
Hugot (lit. 'Inspiration')	2015–2019	A situational sketch wherein either Michael V. or Chariz Solomon speaks in romantic analogies in a conversation, and during the end of each conversation, a group of dancers led by either of them dance to P.A.R.D.'s song, "Hugot".
AlDav	2015	The sketch is a parody of Karen Davila's controversial interview of Alma Moreno from the ANC show Headstart in a form of a game show. The sketch aired on Christmas of 2015. The title is also a pun of the phenomenal tandem AlDub (only shown once and two days before Christmas).
Wag Kang Judgemental (lit. 'Don't Be Judgemental')	2016	A sketch which is a parody of ABS-CBN's hit legal drama program, Ipaglaban Mo!, which shows several unfinished scenarios and what would really happen if the scenario was not judged by people immediately. Hosted by Judge Arturo Mental portrayed by Michael V.
Pool Señorita	2016	A parody of Poor Señorita. It is about a rich woman loitering by the nearby pool who always encounters her rivals.
Several MMA Parodies	2016	Several parodies of MMA matches, notably between the duel between Baron Geisler and Kiko Matos, with several twists and a post-fight interview.
Engkantodo	2016	Parody version of Encantadia and a portmanteau of engkanto and todo (maximum or more). About the four big and healthy Hang'gres (combined pun of Sang'gres and hungry) who will take the throne of Engkantodo. "Kaen ng Todo" (lit. "eat more") is an anagram of the titular segment.
Alyas Ruben Tagalog	2016	Parody version of Alyas Robin Hood and famous kundiman singer Ruben Tagalog. Played by Michael V.
Magtanong kay Mang Tañong (lit. 'Ask Mr. Tañong')	2016, 2019	This segment would usually involve a scenario in which the titular character Mang Tañong (Michael V.) would often interrupt a conversation between a group of drinking buddies (played by Paolo Contis, Boy-2 Quizon, and RJ Padilla) to tell stories of his past that is related to said conversation, albeit filled with inaccuracy and wrong information. To the dismay of the drinking buddies who would always try to correct him (Quizon's character, for instance, would cite Wikipedia articles related to the topic to prove the group's point), Mang Tañong would often insist that his erroneous stories are 100% real. To cite an example, Mang Tañong once claimed that he "jammed with the Eraserheads with its frontman, Chito Miranda", even though Miranda is actually the frontman of another band, Parokya ni Edgar. In another example, Mang Tañong claimed that he watched Pokémon where it is all about a cat-like robot who helps a young boy named Nobita who was bullied by his peers, even though his statement pertains to Doraemon.
Buhay ng Bakla (lit. 'Life of a Gay')	2016–2018	Sketches about gays/bisexuals/closet gays turning on music/poem combo to stress their grievances upon a bar. Features a local band named Onyx.
Balitang Ina (lit. 'Motherly News')	2016–2021	A parody of female-oriented talk shows like Mars and ABS-CBN's Magandang Buhay (currently Magandang Buhay is airing on Kapamilya Channel, A2Z, and ALLTV), this segment is hosted by Mommy Vicky (Valeen Montenegro) and Mommy Karen (Chariz Solomon) and would usually include several instances of wordplay and puns, specifically with the word "tangina" (son of a bitch).
Jungle Belles	2016-2017	
Basa Basa Pik (lit. 'Wet Wet Pick')	2016-2022	This is a segment that airs before the end of the broadcast where the cast members would participate in games and is often hosted by Michael V. himself.
Patikim ni Kim (lit. 'Kim's Sample')	2016-2022	A sketch segment about a cooking show hosted by Kim Domingo. The mini-show consists of her interaction with most of the audience members that are predominantly male fans whom she picks randomly to taste her newly cooked recipes. In the early episodes of the show, the running gag centers on her picking mostly male audience members who are married or in a relationship, much to the chagrin of their partners. Eventually, the running gag was scrapped and it only centered on Kim's recipes laced with double-meaning recipe names and innuendos.
Manyikas (lit. 'Dolls')	2017	
Go, Go Pareng Roger (lit. 'Go, Go Brother Roger')	2017	Parody Of Mighty Morphin Power Rangers
Hapitot (lit. 'Happy Thought')	2017–2022	
Ngetflix (lit. 'Uglyflix')	2017–2019	Parody of Netflix
Impracti-Karibal Pandesal (lit. 'Impracti-rival pan de sal')	2018	Parody of truTV's reality show Impractical Jokers and the GMA Network's primetime drama, Kambal, Karibal (lit. 'Twin, Rival')
Misis Communication	2018	
Ika-6 na Hulog (lit. 'The Sixth Deposit')	2018	Parody of GMA afternoon drama Ika-6 na Utos (lit. 'The Sixth Commandment').
Dear Uncle Jak	2018	Parody of Papa Jack's popular radio advice show "True Love Confessions" that formerly aired on MBC's FM station Love Radio. The recurring gag in the segment has Uncle Jak (Michael V.) engage female listeners in a small innuendo after he gives advice resulting in listeners hanging up on him.
TOTGAY: The One That Got Ahas... Yummy!	2018	Parody of Star Cinema film, DOTGA: Da One That Ghost Away and the GMA drama The One That Got Away. Ahas means "snake".
Prettina vs. Uglytta	2018	
Sundo't Balita (lit. 'Chaperone and News')	2018	
Peping Seksi (lit. 'Sexy Peping')	2018	
Familia Boses (lit. 'Voice Family')	2018	Parody of the GMA Network's drama, Pamilya Roces
Crazy Poor Asians	2018–2019	Parody of the 2018 film, Crazy Rich Asians. Features a poor family complaining about their hardships and livelihood.
Pik Pik Bato (lit. 'Pik Pik Rock')	2018–2019	
Dramakata	2018–2019	A musical segment and a portmanteau of drama and makata (poet) in which two sets of mothers, Pasing (played by Denise Barbacena) and Kristal (played by Chariz Solomon) engage in battle rapping alongside their sons Benjie and Daniel (played by Michael V. and Archie Alemania, respectively) in various dramatic situations. Usually, a third-party character (either played by Betong or Sef Cadayona) would rap and stop the battle and properly explain their circumstances.
Tonight with Arnold Kambiyo	2019	Parody of GMA News TV talk show Tonight with Arnold Clavio, with the word kambiyo meaning "change"
Diary of Marjorie	2019	
IncrediBakla (lit. 'IncrediGay')	2019	Parody of the Marvel character, Incredible Hulk.
Denggay	2019	A segment that parodies the now-popular vlogging "do it yourself" uploads. It centers on Denggay, a heartbroken fashionista vlogger who uses "hugot" words in her spiels.
Raf-Raf in Action	2019	A segment that parodies the Raffy Tulfo in Action program. In this segment, Michael V. portrays Raf-Raf (an obvious spoof of broadcaster and action man Raffy Tulfo) and Denise Barbacena as Cherry Ramon (a spoof of Sharee Roman, Tulfo's co-host). This segment solves complaints made by people, often in a hilarious manner.
What is the Meaning of This?	2020–present	A segment that features Analyn Barro as a sexy online teacher. On July 19, 2022 episode, it instead featured Dasuri Choi as a guest for a Korean version of the skit. Since 2024, she now wears proper clothing instead of sexy clothing from its previous iterations.
First Yoyo	2021	Parody of Telebabad series First Yaya. It features Analyn Barro who portrayed Gemrose in the original series, parodying Pilar Pilapil's character Blessilda in footage of the episode.
Prima Dugas (lit. 'Primary Cheats')	2021	Parody of Afternoon Prime series Prima Donnas. Betong Sumaya portrays Aiko Melendez's character Kendra in footage of the series.
Ang Madramang Drama Series (lit. 'The Dramatic Drama Series')	2022–2023	A segment that parodies most of dramatic scenes from typical soap operas, mostly from an Indian soap opera.
Praning Man Philippines (lit. 'Paranoid Man Philippines')	2022	Parody of GMA's reality competition show, Running Man Philippines.
Adexia	2023	Parody of Amazon Alexa. A cast member talks to the Adexia speaker (itself a parody of the Alexa speaker) and jokes about something.
Bortas V	2023	Parody of the hit anime series Voltes V, and its live-action adaptation on the network, Voltes V: Legacy. The "bortas" (a Filipino gay slang for a muscular man) are played by Buboy Villar, Paolo Contis, Betong Sumaya, Kokoy de Santos, and EA Guzman. Coincidentally, this is also the name of a segment of TV5's E.A.T., albeit spelled "Vortas 5", which also features a similar premise, but functions as a Mr. Pogi-like male talent contest instead of a comedy skit.
Waste	2023–2024	Parody of Wish 107.5 FM and its trademark Wish Bus, called Waste Truck. It would later appear again on the music video of parody song entitled Hilaw (lit. 'Unripe') by Yaki (Dilaw (lit. 'Yellow') by Maki) (see OPM Parodies).
Kulot en Kulet	2024–present	A recurring segment that follows Kulot (Kokoy de Santos) and Kulet (Buboy Villar), two mendicant street dwellers, and their day-to-day shenanigans.
Mr. and Mrs.	2024–present	A segment that shows Mr. (played by Michael V.) and Mrs. (played by Chariz Solomon). In each episode, Mrs. gets mad at Mr. for only one thing—Mr. is a womanizer who loves women.
Super Momshie	2024–present	A recurring segment that follows EA de Guzman as the titular superhero who solves problems concerning the gay community and/or the community.
Family Food	2024	Another parody of GMA's running game show, Family Feud with Dingdong Dantes in a cameo appearance from the studio of the said show. The special segment that is part of a special week is a crossover of the Best Time Ever timeslot.
My Gwardyang Alien (lit. 'My Security Guard Alien')	2024	Parody of GMA's primetime series, My Guardian Alien.
UnliFans	2024	Parody of an adult internet content subscription service, OnlyFans.
Widows' Ward	2024	Parody of GMA's running murder-mystery drama series, Widows' War.
Pulang Arrow (lit. 'Red Arrow')	2024	Parodies of GMA's running war drama series, Pulang Araw (lit. 'Red Sun').
Kulang Araw (lit. 'Insufficient Sun')	2024	Parodies of GMA's running war drama series, Pulang Araw (lit. 'Red Sun').
Walang Araw (lit. 'No Sun')	2024	Parodies of GMA's running war drama series, Pulang Araw (lit. 'Red Sun').
Palong Araw (lit. 'Extinguished Sun')	2024	Parodies of GMA's running war drama series, Pulang Araw (lit. 'Red Sun').
AFAMily Feud	2024	Another parody of GMA's running game show, Family Feud. The segment features two fictional clans—the Johnsons and the Smiths—whose members are humorously portrayed as Filipinos married to foreigners, or "AFAM" (a Taglish slang for "A Foreigner Around Manila"). Through exaggerated backstories and playful banter, the families compete in a mock survey game, culminating in a comedic twist when a contestant correctly guesses “92” as the typical age of foreigners marrying Filipinas, sparking a funny confrontation over a shared elderly boyfriend.
Windows War/Widows' Wart/Weirdos' War	2024	Parodies of GMA's running murder-mystery drama series, Widows' War.
Agresibo (lit. 'Aggressive')	2025–present	A parody of GMA's running public service program, Resibo: Walang Lusot ang May Atraso.
Ana-Logy	2025	A segment that stars Analyn Barro in her titular role. Her introduction is "Ang [Thing] ay parang...", then completes the analogy, and she ends it with "'di ba?".
Ang'gre (lit. 'Angry')	2025	A parody of GMA Telefantasya series, Encantadia Chronicles: Sang'gre. It is a continuation of Enkangtodo.
Jovanna Ala-Waist	2025	A segment that stars Matt Lozano in his titular role, where he dances in both the intro and outro, and says the benefits of being plus-sized (overweight or obese) after the intro. This character is an obvious parody of the actress, model, and social influencer Ivana Alawi.
Balita Para sa Bayan (lit. 'News for the Town')	2026–present	This segment features the original and new Bubble Gang members (known as the Bubble Gang ng Bayan) reporting news in three trios of two or three members each, such that the first trio will read its main details; the second trio, the additional details; and the third trio will end in a funny twist.
Kambyo (lit. 'Gear Shift')	2026–present	One of the most recent sketches in Bubble Gang. All of the members can be seen dancing in a fixed circular path. When the music stops, the first person will start his/her good thing/mood, and the second one will end with a laughable reason, which should rhyme with the last word said by him/her.

=== Ang Dating Doon ===
A screenshot of Ang Dating Doon featuring Brod Pete and Cesar Cosme

Ang Dating Doon (English: What Used to Be There) is a sketch that parodies the Members Church of God International's (MCGI) long-running religious program Ang Dating Daan, and in particular its sister program Itanong mo kay Soriano, Biblia ang Sasagot! The program's "hosts" are Brod Pete (Isko Salvador)—a caricature of now-former MCGI leader Eli Soriano with a name referencing American actor Brad Pitt, Brother Willy (Cesar Cosme), and Brother Jocel (Chito Francisco)—who is often seen reading the expositions in the Bible, playing games on his iPad (in later episodes) and also, occasionally sleeping through the show.

The sketch parodies the MCGI's "Bible expositions"; during each sketch, various members of the audience come up and present questions to Brod Pete to be answered by the panel. However, rather than scripture, Pete has Brother Willy read various extracts from nursery rhymes or song lyrics instead, and then interprets the "passage" to answer the question presented. Various exclamations such as "Alien!" or "Raise the Roof!" would also be used (as a parody of the common exclamations "Amen" and "Praise the Lord"). The word "Alien!" originated from Michael V. after the comedian portrayed El Shaddai Bro. Mike Velarde at a spoof segment in early 1998. At first, the nursery rhyme "Row Row Row Your Boat" was used as its theme song, but it later began to comedically use the Voltes V opening theme "Voltes V no Uta".

The sketch originally appeared on Bubble Gang from 1998 to 1999, and was briefly revived in 2001 and 2005. In 2011, the sketch was revived as Ang Bagong Dating Doon (The New Formerly There), with Brod Pete's red books replaced by laptops and an iPad (with Jocel sometimes seen checking his social networks or playing games rather than paying attention to the show), On the June 27, 2014 episode, the sketch was retitled Ang Bagong Dating Doon International, reflecting the new formats of Ang Dating Daan and Itanong mo kay Soriano wherein the MCGI's Mass Indoctrinations and Worldwide Bible Expositions, respectively, replaced the previous ones, after Soriano went into exile in 2010.

In a 1999 interview, Soriano himself stated that he didn't mind the parody, and credited the sketch for boosting the popularity of Ang Dating Daan.

Variations of the sketch have appeared on other Filipino comedy programs; when Salvador moved to ABS-CBN and became a regular on its show Klasmeyts, the sketch was brought to the show as Doon Dati with a similar premise and elements. As a satire of the MCGI's conflicts with the Iglesia ni Cristo (INC), the show featured a sister sketch—May Tama Kami (lit. "We Are Correct", but also "We Are Nuts")—a parody of the INC show Ang Tamang Daan where hosts played by Bayani Agbayani and Herbert Bautista rebuked Brod Pete's teachings through nursery rhymes and children's folk tales. The ABC sketch comedies Ispup and Teka Mona! also featured variations of Ang Dating Doon; the latter, Ang Daming Daan ("Many Paths" or "Many Hundreds"), featured Joey de Leon portraying Bro. Elvis Soriano—a composite of Soriano with singer Elvis Presley—and Mike "Pekto" Nacua as Brother Hud, Bro. Elvis' Judas-like assistant. It followed a similar premise to Ang Dating Doon;, except the audience members had to pay ₱100 to ask a question (a parody of one of the accusations to MCGI by INC wherein Bro. Eli allegedly charges his followers with a large sum of money).

Brod. Pete is also a segment host for the UNTV show Klasrum (formerly as Bread Tambayan). Ironically, UNTV is the current home of Ang Dating Daan, and UNTV is operated by Breakthrough and Milestones Productions International (led by its chairman and CEO "Kuya" Daniel Razon, nephew of Eli Soriano and the Assistant Overall Servant of MCGI) which is under the Broadcast ministry of MCGI.

=== Discography ===
Year of release	Title	Certification	Publisher
1999	Alien, Ang Dating Doon: The Album	Platinum	Warner Music Philippines

== Recurring characters ==
Segment	Description
Bel Tiongco (formerly Bel Chionglo and Bel Chiongco)	Parody of broadcaster Mel Tiangco, played by Rufa Mae Quinto (2001–2007), Ethel Booba (2006), and Denise Barbacena (2021)
Bryan Bryan	Parody of musician Ryan Cayabyab portrayed by Ogie Alcasid
Billy Kle	Parody of fitness instructor Billy Blanks. He invented the aerobic exercise Taiko (above)
Churang Cuneta	Parody of television host Sharon Cuneta, played by Michael V.
Edi Pil	Parody of controversial 2004 presidential candidate, Eddie Gil, who was later disqualified by the Philippine Commission on Elections.
Gay Abunda	Parody of television host Boy Abunda, played by Michael V.
GMHey	Parody of former President Gloria Macapagal Arroyo. Its name also references GMA, the network that airs Bubble Gang.
Jang-Kyu	Parody of the legendary Dae Jang Geum, seen in Jowa in the Palace
Junior	A mischievous and hyperactive kid portrayed by Michael V.
Madam Rocha	Parody of fortune-teller Madam Rosa and her rival, Madam Auring.
Mahalai	Parody of midget actress Mahal.
Rosaminda	Parody of Rosalinda, a titular protagonist played by Thalía. Seen in Rosaminda: Advanced Edition.
Sonny Patilla	Parody of Filipino boxing referee Sonny Padilla portrayed by Antonio Aquitania. He appeared only once in the sketch "Ang Boxing Coach"
Manny Gosh	A recurring musician character played by Ogie Alcasid from 1995 to 1998.
Michael Ricketts	Parody of broadcaster Mike Enriquez, infamous for his coughing on-air and the line, "Excuse me po!". The surname is also a reference to actor Ronnie Ricketts. It was played by Michael V. (1996–1998, 1999–2007), Paolo Bediones (2006), and Denise Barbacena (2021).
Nahatma Galvi	An Indian Dancer whose name is based on Indian activist Mahatma Gandhi.
Papaya Guano	Parody of 24 Oras's Chika Minute segment host Pia Guanio portrayed by Ogie Alcasid. With her hairy armpits raised high, hence her slogan "Hatid sa inyo ay kilikiling totoo" (lit. '"I'm bringing you true armpits"'). Papaya Guano was replaced by Iya Bilina-Arelleno (portrayed by Denise Barbacena) in a 2021 version of 4 Oras.
Sexballs Dancers	Parody of dance group SexBomb Girls. Cast member Antonio Aquitania created the Sexballs which the members are Michael V., Ogie Alcasid, Wendell Ramos, and Aquitania. Some of their notable songs are: "Bakit Mama?" (lit. 'Pride or Ugly') ("Bakit Papa?", by SexBomb Girls). Talks about someone's arrogance and ugliness.; "Si Mama" (lit. 'It's Mother') ("Chihuahua", by DJ BoBo).; "Halika Baby" (lit. 'Come On Baby') ("Halukay Ube", by SexBomb Girls).; "Buy Me" ("Baile" (lit. 'Dance'), by Rochelle Pangilinan). Talks about a boyfriend's dilemma about his girlfriend's buying antics, usually really expensive items.; "I-shoot Mo" (lit. 'Shoot It') ("Itsumo", by Dice & K9). Performed during a concert in Japan. While they were singing, female guests (usually old women), put yen on their pockets.; "Bacha" ("Patcha", by Mocha). Talks about a boyfriend's problem about his girlfriend's morbid obesity and her obsession about food. She exploded after the music ended.; "Sa Malate" (lit. 'In Malate') ("Chocolate", by Soul Control) Talks about their initial attraction to someone in Malate, Manila, only to learn that their assumed female identity was mistaken, leading to a dislike for the district.; "Donya" (lit. 'Madam') ("Don't Cha", by The Pussycat Dolls). Talks about a man and his obviously older but rich girlfriend (matrona).; "May Sipon si Anton" (lit. 'Anton Has a Cold') ("Boom She Boom", by T-Rio). Talks about Aquitania's common cold.; "Pagjulina" ("Angelina", by Lou Bega). Talks about a man's hesitation to undergo circumcision just to meet the conditions of his crush. Juli is a stylized Tagalog word tuli which means circumcision.; "Sasaktan Kita"(lit. 'Hurt You') ("Sasakyan Kita", by K and the Boxers). Talks about someone hurting another person if they ask for something too expensive.; "Nog-Nog" (lit. 'Dark-skinned') ("Low", by Flo Rida). Released during the summer season, it talks about a dark-skinned woman (pertaining to Myka Flores) whose skin was burned as she goes to the beach.; Also, they collaborated with SexBomb Girls to perform their song on the radio and other media for only a short period of time.
Sozimo Bakya	Recurring character portrayed by Ogie Alcasid who is always seen sitting on his table while drinking his morning coffee. He has occasional sketches which is a parody of the former ABS-CBN morning show Alas Singko Y Medya, which even has its own fake, funny news and horoscopes on the side, while Zosimo answers several, albeit out-of-this-world, phone-in questions from televiewers.
Bonggang Bongbong	Gay parody of the Tulfo Brothers (Mon, Ben, Raffy and Erwin). portrayed by Michael V. Acts tough, but with gay overtones. He is later replaced by the Tolpu Brothers (see below)
Angelina and her Yaya	Angelina - A spoiled brat who makes her yaya do things that make her look like a miserable fool, especially in front of her mother. Portrayed by Ogie Alcasid. Angelina's Yaya (nanny) - She cares about her alaga (charge), but is constantly outwitted by Angelina. Portrayed by Michael V. In "Yaya & Angelina: The Spoiled Brat Movie", her name was revealed as Chacha Lucero.
"The Geek"	An unnamed character portrayed by Ogie Alcasid who discusses the different contradicting situations of the Filipino society before and after. One example is this phrase: "Noon, ang mga babae, kapag nakakita ng Hapon, tumatakbo. Ngayon, ang mga babae, kapag nakakakita ng Hapon, lumalapit" (Before, when [Filipino] girls see Japanese men, they run away. Now, when [Filipino] girls see Japanese men, they come near them).
"Tio Petto and Panopio"	Parody of Geppetto and Pinocchio portrayed by Michael V. Tio Petto (Pepito) also provides the voice and actions of Panopio. Instead of being the puppet's father, Pepito is Panopio's uncle. Hence the title, Tio Petto. He always puts Geppetto in trouble and here are some of the puppet's vile antics; kissing the puppet's butt, putting on lipstick, mouth-to-mouth, wearing a bra, biting his toe (If Tio Petto's foot can reach his face), stripteasing on the street and even massaging. His mother was portrayed by Ogie Alcasid and his wife was portrayed by Francine Prieto
"Dingga"	A gay parody of Mars Ravelo's Darna portrayed by Michael V. His alter ego was a lame man named Ading, wherein his henshin device was magical bubble gum.
Sweat	"Ang host na laging pinagpapawisan ng malagkit dahil sa mga intrigang pagkainit-init (The host who always sweats sticky because of hot intrigues)" Parody of John Lapus.
Padre and Sam	Parody of May Bukas Pa's Fr. Anthony and Santino respectively.
Mr. Coco "Mr. Co" Cruz	A spoof of Hayden Kho appeared only once in the segment "Wastong Pagligo" (Correct way of taking a bath).
Jokman	Parody of Queen Seon Deok's Deokman. She likes to tell jokes and tells people that she's a "man". Hence the name, Jokman.
Michael	Parody of Michael Jackson portrayed by Michael V. He wanted peace and quiet to rest but ironically, his fans (including the angels after his death) screamed for him. Appeared once in the sketch "Star sa Langit", possibly as a tribute to the late king of pop.
Tom Yam	An obvious gay parody of Tim Yap, Michael Jackson, and Madonna, portrayed by Michael V. He appeared in the music video of the latter's song, "Hindi Ako Bakla" (I'm Not Gay).
Boy Pickup	The former undefeated Pickup Line Battle Champion in The Pickup Lines portrayed by Ogie Alcasid, who uses nonsensical pickup lines in his verbal battles. He is now defeated by a new Pickup Liner named Boy Basag (see below) who is also portrayed by Ogie Alcasid. Always wears caps, baggy clothing, a beard, and a mustache.
Boy Basag	The new Pickup Line Battle Champion in The Pickup Lines is portrayed by Ogie Alcasid, who uses insults as his pickup lines in his verbal battles (in contrast to the standard romantic puns). He is the only one who can defeat Boy Pick Up which shocked television viewers during his "historic" debut match. He was shown holding baseball bats or steel pipes and sometimes wears a reggae outfit, with a Bob Marley-inspired hairstyle.
Neneng Bakit (Neneng B.)	The moderator of The Pickup Lines sketch portrayed by Sam Pinto. Always questions "bakit?" (why?)
D Wonder Boys	A parody of K-Pop group Wonder Girls and British boy band One Direction. The group consists of Boy 2 Quizon as Chang Gee, Antonio Aquitania as Yee Saw, Michael V. as San Ban Yo, and Ogie Alcasid as Tang Ha Ko. Those names are derived from those other Filipino word sounds. The term "Chang Gee" means Tiangge (Market or Bazaar),"Yee Saw" means Isaw (Chicken's Intestine), "San Ban Yo" means San - Saan? (Where?) and Ban Yo - Banyo (Toilet) and Tang Ha Ko mean Tang Ha - Tanga (Stupid), Ha (What? or Ok), and Ko - Ako (I). This group replaced Sex Balls soon after Wendell Ramos was transferred to TV5.
Cheche & Bureche	The twin sisters with contradicting personalities, played by Ogie Alcasid and Michael V., respectively.
Gagang Lady	A parody of American singer Lady Gaga, portrayed by Michael V. The sketch features her performing Bathroom Dance, a spoof of Gaga’s hit single Bad Romance. The performance humorously depicts her frantic stomach pain and desperate search for a toilet, even to the absurd extent of considering a urinal. The name ‘Gagang Lady’ is a Tagalog pun meaning ‘Crazy Lady.’”
Mr. Aris Assimo	An overly irate man, played by Michael V., who deals with common sense. He hates people reiterating the words he commanded, as well as extremely courteous employees of certain establishments such as restaurants, spas, and convenience stores, which he thinks is "too obvious". He always uses reverse psychology. "Hiyang-hiya naman ako sa 'yo, 'no?!" was his catchphrase, which he usually says near the end of his skit after which he will look at the camera with a surprised look, his hands raised across his head and his name flashing at the bottom of the screen, though there have been some variations (E.g. in a drive-thru skit, he slumps his head on the steering wheel of his car right into its horn honking the car in the process right after saying his catchphrase and another episode shows the one holding a glass of wine and drinks it during a Valentine date.) One example is this dialogue: Mr. Assimo: Jorge, Ipa-print mo nga itong mga papers. Pakibilisan lang ha? (Jorge, please print these papers. Quickly.); Jorge: Sir, i-piprint ko po, di ba? (Sir, I will print it, right?); Mr. Assimo: Hindi. I-fafax mo, para may makatanggap na iba at sila ang mag-paprint para sakin! (No. You will fax it, so that other people may receive it and they will print it for me!); Jorge: Sorry po, sir. Ilang copies po ba? (I'm sorry sir. How many copies?); Mr. Assimo: Tatlo. Ay, apatin mo na. (Three. No, make it four.); Jorge: Sir, apat ho, di ba? (Sir, four copies, isn't it?); Mr. Assimo: Hindi! Walo. Dalawang daan pa nga eh. Ano Ba?! Kakasabi ko lang apat eh! Pambihira naman... (No! Eight. Even two hundred will do. Oh c'mon! I already said four!); Jorge: Sorry po. Ah, sir, kailangan na po ba ito ngayon? (I'm sorry. Uh, sir, do you need this now?); Mr. Assimo: AY HINDI! Hindi ko kailangan yan! Hindi naman yan importante eh! Kahit ipa-print mo pa bukas, sa isang linggo, o sa isang taon! BAHALA KA!!! Hiyang-hiya naman ako sa 'yo, 'no?! (NO! I don't need it! That's not even important! Even if you print that tomorrow, or next week, or next year! I DON'T CARE!!! I feel ashamed asking you, you know?!)
Tita Herminigilda	An obvious parody of Maalaala Mo Kaya host Ms. Charo Santos-Concio portrayed by Michael V. She makes the dialogues of the scenario written by the letter sender. She replaced Evelyn Magpayo who was also portrayed by Michael V. In the end, the letter sender seeks advice on whether it is right for him/her to do what he/she is thinking and Tita Herminigilda usually answers that it is the right to do it and the latter requests the staff to read the next letter and discards the letter she read recently. One example is this dialogue: Letter Sender: Tama po ba o mali na hiwalayan ko na si Efren? (lit. Is it right or wrong for Efren and I to separate?) Tita Herminigilda: Tama. Next letter, please (Right. Next letter, please)
Coach Hector Calmado	Parody of MadTV's Coach Sandy Hines.
Demo Demonyito	A devil who demonstrates to people how to do evil things but is usually the victim of his own schemes. He is portrayed by Michael V.
Zac Apron	Parody of American actor Zac Efron portrayed by Ogie Alcasid.
Tata Lino	An intelligent/wise hermit (hence the name, "Tata Lino" which means "Father Lino" or a play on the Filipino word meaning "gifted" or "become smarter") portrayed by Michael V. He usually answers or gives advice to other people by using figurative language. But always ignores insults and leaves Diego behind if his turn to ask, due to his ugliness. One example is this line: Tata Lino: Tandaan mo iha, ang pag-ibig ay parang Plants vs. Zombies. Binabakuran mo na nga, inaaswang ka pa rin (Remember, young lady, love is like (a game) of Plants vs. Zombies. How many times you plant, you are still haunted) Lino had a pet parrot named "Lolo Loro". He also has a cousin named Tata Moody portrayed by Paolo Contis who was introduced during Diego's return after the latter's absence in the sketch. However, in some episodes, Diego's part is skipped and is eventually replaced by special guests who ask for advice. Notable guests included Ramon Bautista, Lilia Cuntapay, Mike Hanopol, Mahal, Alden Richards, Maine Mendoza, Gina Alajar, Baron Geisler, Gabby Concepcion, Teri Onor, Philip Lazaro, Tetay, Sinon Loresca, Ryza Cenon, Sunshine Dizon and Andre Paras. Arnold Clavio, Herbert Bautista, Freddie Aguilar and Dennis Trillo as the special guests during the 19th-anniversary episode.
Gerry Gerinimo	An obvious parody of informative broadcaster and agriculturist Gerry Geronimo portrayed by Michael V. He shows newly discovered products such as vegetables, fruits, hygiene products, foods, grocery items, etc. produced by genetic engineering which are parodies of real-life products.
Jodie Mangga	Parody of radio host and love guru Joe D' Mango portrayed by Michael V. as a hold-upper but eventually gives his victims some love advice (similar to his original counterpart).
Aling Mary Assimo	A cruel political-like registrar (portrayed by Michael V) who signs forms and owns a small convenience store and treats customers badly, such as selling cheap items for expensive prices (E.g., One kilo of tocino worth P1000 and cafeteria food such as adobo and sinigang for 80 pesos and 50 pesos respectively). Fans regard her as Mr. Assimo's Mother due to their similar behavior. It is revealed in the June 14, 2014, episode that her business is run by the government and that she is a widowed mother who has worked for 20 years in her position.
Antonietta	An anti-heroine, dubbed as "Teleserye Evil Queen", (played by Betong) who overhears and oversees the schemes and the actions of her enemies and obviously thinks of their schemes and/or actions as an effective cause of watching soap operas, telenovelas or dramas just to make the televiewers see their "dramatic" actions. She can also roughly compare the differences between in real life or reality and in drama (in Gloria Romero's guesting case, horror films and Odette Khan's case, fictional superheroes, and creatures, in Jackie Lou Blanco's case, action films and fake weapons). Antonietta can also hear anyone's thoughts and even the narrator's voice in the climax before she reacts to it. She gives VIP treatments to special guests of Bubble Gang but mostly ends up losing to them, few also ended up befriended as well. Notable guests in this sketch are the following: Chanda Romero - known as Sol Del Mundo from My Husband's Lover and also villainous roles in soap operas. Chanda mauls Antonietta.; Roi Vinzon - known as Armando Soriano from My Husband's Lover and also villainous (sometimes protagonistic) roles in action films. Roi ignores and rejects Antonietta's advances.; Jaclyn Jose - known as Donya Charito Carbonel from Mundo Mo'y Akin. Jaclyn insults her and even predicted the appearance of Celia Rodriguez.; Celia Rodriguez - best known as the villainous Valentina from Lipad, Darna, Lipad!, Braguda Warrior from Darna, Doña Celia Rodriguez viuda de Ungasis from Eat Bulaga's: Kalyeserye and Feliza Salcedo from Because of You. Celia insults and slaps Antonietta and even removes her wig.; Odette Khan - known as Donya Trinidad Braganza from Valiente. Odette mauls Antonietta for insulting flying superheroes and her fictional pet.; Maricel Soriano - previously known as Milette Gonzales-Real from Ang Dalawang Mrs. Real. Maricel attacks and insults Antonietta at first but ends up befriending her.; Marian Rivera - known for her protagonist roles such as MariMar, Darna, Carmela. Marian fakes her kiss on Antonietta, who took Betong's character off into himself, but mauls him/her. Marian also promoted for her dance show Marian.; Gloria Romero - known for her part in the horror film Bahay Ni Lola. Gloria Romero sets poison on food intended only for Antonietta in which is successful.; Cherie Gil - known as Lavinia from Bituing Walang Ningning, Señora Miranda Salazar-Hidalgo from Ikaw Lamang and Helena Sanchez-Montenegro from Onanay. Cherie insults Antonietta and splashes a coffee with her signature line "You're nothing but a second-rate trying hard copycat" and later smashes Antonietta with two bottles to make her bleed.; Gladys Reyes - known as Clara from Mara Clara and also villainous roles in soap operas and movies. Gladys mauls and splashes Antonietta and even dares to complain to Vilma Santos about Antonietta.; Rez Cortez - known as Judas Iscariot from 1996 Lenten film Kristo and also villainous roles in action films. Rez Cortez mauls Antonietta and forces her to strip off her clothes akin to a hold-upper.; Eula Valdez - known as Amor Powers from Pangako Sa 'Yo, Violeta Jung/Violeta Salcedo from Koreana (TV series), Selina Pereira-Matias from Mula sa Puso (2011 TV series), Esmeralda from Forever Young and Avria of Encantadia. Eula slaps her and even threatens her with a gun, unless she leaves. Eula also tells the viewers that the taxi Antonietta is riding has a bomb implanted. But the latter survived at the end of the sketch, taking Betong's character off into himself, and ends up thanking Eula.; Mylene Dizon - known as Susan / Sara / Sally Concepción from Sa Dulo ng Walang Hanggan, Dra. Grace Maniego from Budoy and Giselle from Once Upon a Kiss. She slaps the "tied" Antonietta along with Badong (Paolo Contis) and later Mylene is contacted by a certain Senator Miriam Defensor Santiago.; Alessandra De Rossi - known as Valentina from Darna, Loretta Atienza Vergara-Villafuerte from Wish I May and Lulu from Yagit. While wearing her blue swimsuit, she slaps, strips and kicks Antonietta, revealing Antonietta's same swimsuit as Alessandra's. She is sister of former mainstay from the show Assunta de Rossi.; Jackie Lou Blanco - known as Violeta Antonino from Saan Ka Man Naroroon, Dahlia Flores from Destiny Rose and Divina Advincula from Owe My Love. Stabs Antonietta near the armpit with a fake knife and still bleeds and even predicts the appearance of Eddie Garcia.; Jean Garcia - known as Claudia Buenavista from Pangako Sa 'Yo, Miss Minchin from Sarah... Ang Munting Prinsesa, Maita Aragon-Reyes from Stairway to Heaven, Rina Mercado-Alcantara/Valdicañas from The Half Sisters, Teresa Bautista from Kambal, Karibal (which Umali, Tanfelix, Mendoza and Alcantara are guests), Eloisa Vallejo-Buenaventura from Ika-5 Utos and the host of the talk show Love Hotline. Jean slaps and insults Antonietta and shows a detonator when she kneels in front of her, begging for mercy. She even forces Antonietta to remove the latter's blouse which later reveals to have a bomb strapped on her. Jean later detonates the bomb strapped in Antonietta causing the latter and the bomb to explode in the process before the narrator hoped that this is Antonietta's final episode, however Antonietta's alive in the following episode.; Glaiza de Castro - known as the titular role of Grazilda, Heidi from Temptation of Wife, Althea from The Rich Man's Daughter, Sang'gre Pirena from Encantadia and Eunice from Stairway to Heaven. Glaiza slaps Antonietta after the latter mocking her, however her glasses accidentally dropped to make her "blind". Antonietta tells her that Glaiza, being "blinded" would be killed by a car accident, however the car bumps into Antonietta instead before the narrator hoped that Vivian Velez would appear in the future.; Dindo Arroyo - known for portraying henchman roles in action films during '90s. Despite saving Antonietta by fighting back his own henchmen, he later knocks Antonietta into an unconscious state after the latter insulted him and he viciously leaves the bar before the staff quickly checks on the unconscious Antonietta.; Ryan Eigenmann - known as Alfred Alcantara from The Half Sisters. Ryan, being a kidnapper, stabs Antonietta after her attempt to save Amnesia but she failed to save her.; Glydel Mercado - known for portraying antagonistic and supporting roles in drama television such as Amelia from Sa Dulo ng Walang Hanggan, Clara Soriano from Sana Maulit Muli (TV series) and Raquel Labangon-Aguirre from the TV remake Sinungaling Mong Puso. She slaps Antonietta for disturbing and insulting her comatose father in the hospital and even for insulting Glydel's real-life husband and she continues to slap Antonietta on the bed.; Michael de Mesa - known as Gardo Valiente from Valiente, Ravenum from Mulawin, Juancho Sanreal from Indio, Armani Vitto from Destiny Rose, and Moises Aguirre from Sinungaling Mong Puso. In a typical scene from a police undercover operation, his cover is blown by Antonietta's insults. Forces Antonietta to lie back and starts getting whipped with a belt.; Alden Richards and Maine Mendoza - known as the phenomenal loveteam AlDub. Maine, along with Alden, proclaims to Antonietta that she's the new owner of her mansion, however, Antonietta revokes them and she takes them out until Sprakenheit (parody of Adolf Hitler, played by Michael V.) intervenes to assault her. She had thought of him as the late Ramon Zamora, the original actor of Sprankenheit, at one point. They're both hosts from Eat Bulaga!, Alden's Drama Project from One True Love, Mundo Mo'y Akin, Carmela (which Marian Rivera as a guest in 2014) and The World Between Us, Maine's Comedy Project from Daddy's Gurl and they're both from drama series Destined to be Yours.; Bembol Roco - known as the various roles in film and on television. He husks to Antonietta at the bar.; Bianca Umali, Miguel Tanfelix, Kyline Alcantara and Pauline Mendoza - playing their respective roles (Crisanta, Diego, Cheska and Criselda) from Kambal, Karibal. Umali and Tanfelix are known for their loveteam BiGuel, while Alcantara is known for portraying Arlene Benedicto from ABS-CBN's Annaliza. Antonietta crashes Cheska's debut and criticizes the characters of Kambal, Karibal (notably Criselda), in which they get annoyed. However, in a plot twist, Crisanta, Diego, and Cheska reveal themselves as ghosts as the three, along with Criselda, possess Antonietta to hurt her and they scare her away. Criselda had thought of Antonietta as Black Lady (portrayed by Roence Santos in Kambal, Karibal) at one point.; Claire Castro - She is the daughter of 90s actors Raven Villanueva and Diego Castro known as Cielo in television adaptation Nagbabagang Luha (which Glaiza de Castro as a guest in 2016). She slaps Antonietta like Gina Alajar does in back-handed slap to Claire in the Scene. She grabs Antonietta at the Red Cake and Mikoy gives a vase of Rose with Water to Claire and splashes Antonietta.; Pinky Amador - best known as Moira Rutaquio-Tanyag from Abot-Kamay na Pangarap. Antonietta interrupts Pinky's performance as she expects that their special guest performer for their 29th anniversary episode was Moira Dela Torre but they brought Pinky as "Moira" instead. After getting insulted by Antonietta, Pinky slapped her for multiple times.; There are also instances at the end of each episode, Antonietta thanks the guests for being part of the show (most notably Marian Rivera, Maricel Soriano, Gladys Reyes, Rez Cortez, and Eula Valdez). Antonietta also appears in IstambaySerye (Istambay Sa Looban) when Betong switched his Lolo Nidoro role into the latter, being the "solution" to Nidoro's voice problems, and being another IstambaySerye version of Lola Nidora somehow, she becomes the antagonist to AlBad (Albert and Yaya Badel). Due to her popularity, Antonietta frequently appears in some shows outside Bubble Gang such as Celebrity Bluff (as a Celebrity Bluffer), CelebriTV, Sarap Diva and among others. Antonietta's back story has featured in Dear Uge.
Cecilio Sasuman	An elementary school student (portrayed by Michael V.) who suffers from a speech defect that pronounces "S" as "T" to make it appear that his declamation speeches sound obscene. "Titihin" was the word he always used in two declamations like "Sino ang Dapat Sisihin" & "Masisisi ba kita?"
Sec. De Anim	Parody of former Senator and DOJ Secretary Leila de Lima.
Phil-Ing	A charlatan portrayed by Michael V (which is a play on the slang term "Feeling"). who reacts to every compliment he feels to make it appear as if they were referring to him.
Ricardo "Ricky" Bernal	A television star portrayed by Paolo Contis whose name is an obvious parody of Richard Gutierrez and Kris Bernal. He is the celebrity crush of Aling Mary. He only appeared once in the sketch "Aling Mary".
Tina Pulez	Parody of alleged PDAF Scam mastermind Janet Napoles, played by Denise Barbacena. Wears handcuffs and a bulletproof vest emblazoned with "PULIS" in front.
Susie Luwalhati	A woman with large chests portrayed by Rufa Mae Quinto. Her character became controversial after the MTRCB summoned Rufa Mae Quinto and Michael V. after November 29, 2013, episode displays an alleged derogatory depiction of women on December 9, 2013. She always finds jobs, competing with men, but always gets the job by her exhibitionistic and erotic moves, like her bouncing breasts.
James Wang	A secret agent/detective from Japan portrayed by Jacky Woo. His character is an obvious parody of James Bond and Jackie Chan. Always gets arrested in the end.
Donya Ina Moran	A mother named "Donya Ina" (inspired by Mundo Mo'y Akin character Donya Charito) portrayed by Michael V. who dislikes modern mannerisms and influences of young people, most notably regarding from a current trends in social media sites. She always criticizes selfies. The famous lines were "Paki-explain" & ended with "Labyu". It is revealed in the January 31, 2014, episode that she has an older sister who is ironically portrayed by Jaclyn Jose herself.
Selphie Moran, later known as Ella Moran	Daughter of Ina, portrayed by Sef Cadayona, who is always addicted to social websites but she was being criticized and ashamed by her mother's complaints against modern mannerisms. Likes posting, "selfie" pictures and updating her status every time. On the 30th anniversary episode, it was revealed that she changed her nickname to Ella, based on her full name as Stella Sophie Moran.
Patty Moran	She is Donya Ina's older sister and Selphie's aunt portrayed by Jaclyn Jose, who previously played Donya Charito from Mundo Mo'y Akin. She scolded her younger sister for doing so with her niece in the January 31, 2014, episode.
San Pedro	The guardian of the Gates of Heaven portrayed by Wendell Ramos and later by Paolo Contis after the former transferred to TV5. His name is based on St. Peter, the loyal Apostle of Jesus Christ. Always holding a book, a key, and a rooster.
Lala Y Tera	A woman who likes to insult other people is portrayed by Chariz Solomon whose name is a pun on the word "laitera" meaning an insulting woman.
Bubble Shakers	Four sexy dancers which perform in-between sketches or before every commercial break portrayed by Andrea Torres, Max Collins, Sam Pinto, Arny Ross.
Tolpu Brothers	Den Tolpu (Jan Manual), Berwin Tolpu (Paolo Contis), and Daffy Tolpu (Michael V.). Hosts of the sketch T3 Nyo. They are an obvious parody of the Tulfo Brothers Ben, Erwin and Raffy, respectively. Their name is a pun on the phrase "putol" meaning "cut" or "amputated" As their surname implies, they have amputated parts of their body (except Daffy). Den has an amputated finger, Berwin has an amputated leg, while Daffy is complete.
P.A.R.D.	A boy band stand for its members Padilla for (RJ Padilla), A for Antonio (Aquitania), R for Roadfill, D for Dos (Boy2 Quizon). All of their songs are all about what they want like "Kwek Kwek" (featuring Gwen Zamora), "Hug", "Saging" (featuring Paolo Contis as Don Cantoni and Filipino rapper Dash Calzado), "Hugot" (featuring Michael V. as Tata Lino), "Huli Ka Balbon" (featuring Paolo Contis, Max Collins, Chariz Solomon, Jazhel Manabat and Kim Domingo). Padilla, is also known for his line in their songs "Ayoko n'yan" (lit. "I don't like it/that"). Later, Paolo Contis becomes the additional member of the band as P stands for Paolo.
Michael Five	Parody of Dubai-based fashion designer Michael Cinco portrayed by Michael V.
Soaperman, Batnaman, Sikatwoman and Thunder Woman	An obvious parody of Superman who uses dramatic acts as his powers portrayed by Paolo Contis. He has superhero sidekicks namely Batnaman (parody of Batman) portrayed by Michael V. who always asks "Ba't naman?" (a contraction of "bakit naman" meaning "Why so?"), Sikatwoman (parody of Catwoman) who is a sexy superhero portrayed by Sam Pinto, and Thunder Woman (parody of Wonder Woman) portrayed by Betong as an old lady which transforms as "The oldest superhero". The main villain, who is usually a robber, is portrayed by Antonio Aquitania.
Babaless and Redford Jr.	Parody of Babalu and Redford White portrayed by Roadfill Obeso and RJ Padilla respectively.
Albert and Yaya Badel or AlBad	Parody of KalyeSerye's loveteam AlDub. Albert, portrayed by Juancho Trivino, is the IstambaySerye's version of Bae Alden and Yaya Badel, portrayed by Denise Barbacena, is the IstambaySerye's version of Yaya Dub who is actually a male before changing into female and usually does lipsynching.
Lolo Nidoro	Parody of KalyeSerye's Lola Nidora, portrayed by Betong Sumaya. Like KalyeSerye's Lola Nidora, Nidoro also dislikes Alfred for Yaya Badel. And also he also does dubbing, like his yaya. But he is known to be foul-smelled by the bystanders. At the end of the sketch, Betong switched his Lolo Nidoro character into Antonietta (similar to Wally Bayola switching his role to another like Lola Nidora to either DuhRizz or Mayordoma Rihanna in KalyeSerye).
Karen Aguila	Parody of ABS-CBN newscaster Karen Davila portrayed by Michael V. Appeared in the sketch AlDav.
Thelma Moreno	Parody of actress-politician Alma Moreno portrayed by Betong. Also appeared in the sketch AlDav.
Judge Arturo Mental	Parody of former Chief Justice Artemio Panganiban and father-and-son lawyers Attys. Jose and Jopet Sison. Appeared in the sketch "Wag Kang Judgemental".
"Charot Man", "Kamot Man", and "Parrot Man"	Parodies of Jeyrick Sigmaton also known as "Carrot Man" the good-looking Igorot man with a basket of carrots who went viral on social media. Charot Man is portrayed by Sef Cadayona, Kamot Man by Dennis Trillo, and Parrot Man by Michael V.
Antonyms Santos, Apol Larson, and Andy Totoo	A group of reporters who sends opposite news to the viewers. Santos is portrayed by Paolo Contis, Larson is portrayed by Valeen Montenegro, while Totoo is portrayed by Betong. Santos' name is a pun on Anthony and Antonym, whereas Totoo's is a pun of the phrase Ang 'di totoo (lit. which is not true)
Tuderti	Parody of former President Rodrigo Duterte, portrayed by Michael V.
Taran Taro and Taran Tawoo	Play on 'tarantado' (lit. foolish/stupid); parody version of Piko-Taro, the stage name of Japanese comedian Daimaou Kosaka, famous for PPAP (Pen-Pineapple-Apple-Pen), portrayed by Michael V. and Jacky Woo, respectively.
Uncle Jak	Host of Dear Uncle Jak, who is an obvious parody of Papa Jackson and Jak Roberto, portrayed by Michael V.
Becky Corrales	Parody of GMA News anchor Vicky Morales, portrayed by Michael V. and Denise Barbacena.
Kuya Wowie	Parody of controversial host Willie Revillame portrayed by Michael V. Kuya Wowie also made a guest appearance in Wowowin, during the Shopee's 12.12 Christmas Sale segment on December 12, 2021, and then again in December 22 and 23 as a substitute to Willie Revillame himself.
Bea Bangenge	Parody of actress Bea Binene. Bea Bangenge somehow resembles and is named after Bebang from Michael V.'s past show Bitoy's World, in which her image appears at the intro of Bea Bangenge skit. Portrayed by Michael V.
Lebrown James	Parody of NBA superstar LeBron James, portrayed by Paolo Contis.
Mommy Vicky and Mommy Karen	Main anchors of the women-oriented parody talk show "Balitang Ina". The names of the anchors were derived from female newscasters/celebrity moms Vicky Morales and Karen Davila.
Piyaya Arcangel	Parody of GMA News reporter Pia Arcangel, portrayed by Lovely Abella.
Atty. Larry Gagon	Parody of then-lawyer Larry Gadon, portrayed by Michael V. Just like his real-life counterpart, he always says the word "bobo" (meaning "idiot"/"retard") at the end of his statements to the reporters whom he answered their questions.
Raf-Raf	A parody of broadcaster and action man Raffy Tulfo portrayed by Michael V. He hosts the show Raf-Raf in Action alongside Cherry Ramon (portrayed by Denise Barbacena), a parody of Tulfo's co-host, Sharee Roman. They act on complaints put forward by people, often in a hilarious way.
Aling Alicia	A sari-sari store owner who likes to tell gossips to those who will buy in her store. Portrayed by Liezel Lopez.
Mang Taning and Mang Nani	Parody of GMA News Weather Forecaster Nathaniel "Mang Tani" Cruz, played by Michael V. Mang Taning made a weather forecast on an x-ray image of a person's lungs while Mang Nani, a pun from a Japanese word Nani (What), will do mostly a TikTok dance challenge while he reports a weather forecast.
BTLG	Parody of South Korean boy band BTS, performing their song called "Ayoko Na Se’Yo" (I Don't Want You).
Glen Gatchalian	Host of the show's new segment, Patibong, portrayed by Paolo Contis. He is an obvious parody of Senator Sherwin Gatchalian.
Small Lodi	Parody of vlogger Small Laude, portrayed by Sef Cadayona. She always presents her subscribers tours of her house and favorite things.
Janice Go	Parody of a Philippine businesswoman and politician Alice Guo.
Bini-B10	Parody of a Filipino pop group Bini.
Emil Maangil	Parody of the anchor, broadcaster, journalist, and host Emil Sumangil. Played by Paolo Contis.
Pakelamarra	Parody of Sang'gre Flamarra, portrayed by Faith da Silva. Her name is also the pun of the word "pakialamera", meaning "a meddlesome or nosy person". Played by Chariz Solomon.
Adamot	Parody of Sang'gre Adamus, portrayed by Kelvin Miranda. His name is also the pun of the word "damot", meaning "selfishness" or "stinginess". Played by Kokoy de Santos.
Laiterra	Parody of Sang'gre Terra, portrayed by Bianca Umali. Her name is also the pun of the word "lait", meaning "insult". Played by Buboy Villar, who also played Wantuk in the Encantadia series.
Hindeia	Parody of Sang'gre Deia, portrayed by Angel Guardian. Her name is also the pun of the phrase "hindi ha", meaning "no huh". Played by Analyn Barro.
Ciala Dismaya	A parody of contractor Sarah Discaya, portrayed by Michael V. Her name is derived from the slang word "shala", meaning "fancy", and "dismaya", meaning "disappointment").
Sen. Jinggoy Espada	A parody of senator Jinggoy Estrada, portrayed by Matt Lozano.
Sen. Rodante Markolekta	A parody of senator Rodante Marcoleta, portrayed by Betong Sumaya.
Sen. Mimani	Depicted as a senator, her name is the pun of the phrase send me money. Played by Analyn Barro.
Sec. Kubra	A secretary played by Buboy Villar.
Cong. Kikoy	A parody of Cavite representative Kiko Barzaga, who is meowing while singing and holding his smartphone. He also appears as a host of Ang Dating Doon. Played by Kokoy de Santos.
Cornee Dismaya	A parody of contractor Curlee Discaya, portrayed by Edgar Allan Guzman.
Sen. Berwin Tolpu	A parody of senator Erwin Tulfo. He previously appeared as a host of T3 Nyo and a part of Tolpu Brothers. Played by Paolo Contis.

== Anniversary editions ==
- Bubble Gang Year 4 - 4th anniversary. The special, which took place in front of a live audience at Phenomena, Quezon City, featured the show's famous sketches at that time, such as Ang Dating Doon. (1999)
- 7 On 7 - 7th anniversary. A 2-part anniversary special, the first one featured an awarding event for some past commercial spoofs, with several commercial models as special guests. The second part featured a special concert held at the Music Museum. This special also introduced the show's first change in logo and new theme song. (2002)
- BG8 - 8th anniversary. The month-long special has the first part was Ocho Oras which is a parody of the popular series 24, the second part paying tribute to the past gag shows on Philippine television and the third part featured a special concert held at the Aliw Theater with Parokya Ni Edgar as a guest. (2003)
- Bubble Gang sa Japan - 9th anniversary. The special was filmed in Japan (2004).
- Bubble Gang X – 10th anniversary. X is a reference to 10 in Roman numerals. The special featured sketches joined by guests such as Paolo Bediones, Ethel Booba, Charee Padilla, Pekto and Bearwin Meily. The actual cast of Encantadia appeared and portrayed a comical face-off with their Pinkantadia (spoof on Encantadia) counterparts (2005).
- Bubble Gang 11 - 11th anniversary. The special featured guests such as Joey De Leon, Eddie Garcia, Janno Gibbs, Dennis Trillo, Richard Gutierrez, Angel Locsin, Sen. Bong Revilla and music icons, Regine Velasquez, Ryan Cayabyab and Parokya ni Edgar (2006).
- DO-SE-NA - 12th anniversary. 1st action-musical-comedy television film. A 2-part anniversary special, the high-definition (HD) film featured original songs composed by Michael V. The story revolves around 2 detectives (portrayed by Michael V. and Ogie Alcasid) who gets involved in different adventures ranging from serious to the most hilarious. The title refers to the Spanish "dozena" meaning a set of 12 (2007).
- Bubble Gang 13th Anniversary: A Musical Presentation - 13th anniversary. The special featured live performances in front of an audience at Center Stage, SM Mall of Asia, Pasay (2008).
- 14 Going Steady - 14th anniversary. A 2-part anniversary special, the first one featured a special interview with the former and present cast about the long history, best memories, trivia and behind-the-scene look on the show. The second part featured three television films: a horror-comedy film (Tya Ring), a sex comedy film (Dingdong Lang Ang Pagitan) and a Koreanovela spoof (Tim Song Ko). Dennis Trillo, Iza Calzado, Julia Clarete and Regine Velasquez were the celebrity guests (2009).
- Bubble Gang Sa Japan Katoru Sei Na - continuation of the show's 14th anniversary. As the name implies, the cast and crew shot two episodes in Japan, which they already visited before. Katoru Sei Na is a Romanized parody of the word "Katorse na" meaning "We are 14 years" (2009).
- Bungalow - 15th anniversary (Crystal year). This horror-comedy-musical special paid tribute to the King of OPM Novelty, singer, composer and comedian, Yoyoy Villame. A television film, its story was based on Villame's song Bungalow, which is about a young man's horrifying experience after inheriting a haunted bungalow from a deceased relative. The Halloween presentation, headlined by Michael V. and Ogie Alcasid, also featured its own version of other songs by Villame. The special introduced Jackie Rice, Gwen Zamora, Ellen Adarna and Sam Pinto as the new additions to the Bubble Gang cast. The four actresses were collectively known as Bubblets. (2010)
- Bubble Gang Kin-Z – continuation of the show's 15th anniversary. The show introduced a new intro, which parodied the anime Dragon Ball Z and also references both the Spanish word "quince" (15), as well as Gen Z. (2010)
- Bubble Gang 4x4 – 16th anniversary. The 2-part special featured, for the first time in its history, music videos based on the show's well-known sketches, characters, commercial spoofs and parodies through the years. The guests were Mike Enriquez, Arnold Clavio, Heart Evangelista and Dennis Trillo. The title is a reference to the 4x4 van and the multiplication factors resulting to 16 (2011).
- Bubble Gang Diz Is Siete – 17th anniversary. Instead of a standard gag show, it showcases a collection of "indie films" that consist of drama, action and horror (all of which, of course, has comedic elements). The title is a play on "Diz Iz It!", a former talent show from GMA Network, "This Is It", Michael Jackson's supposed concert residency in 2009, and the Spanish word "diecisiete", meaning 17. (2012)
- Bubble Gang Barely Legal – 18th anniversary. The 2-part special featured live performances in front of an audience and mimicked the concept of having a bar comedy show, pole-dancing performance, late-night party wherein only 18+ customers are allowed to watch. The phrase is a reference of the legal age of majority of a person. The special also introduced new additions to the cast, known as the Bagong Gang. (2013)
- Bubble Gang XIX 19 B.C. - 19th anniversary. The phrase is a pun on the Roman numeral for 19 and the phrase "19 B.C.". The title card, OBB and featured gags of the special are parodies of Ancient Greco-Roman-inspired historical war films such as "300" and "Gladiator". The special featured gags, spoofs, and sketches wherein the characters collaborated with the characters of other shows of GMA network. It was noted for having a lot of celebrities and personalities as special guests. (2014)
- IMBG 20 - 20th anniversary (Porcelain year). A documentary special, in coordination with GMA News and Public Affairs, which tackled Bubble Gang's long history in a span of two decades. The documentary was hosted by Mike Enriquez and Jessica Soho and also featured an interview with the present and former cast and crew. The show also celebrated its emerald anniversary by launching two commemorative books, a first in its history, at Gateway Cineplex while the documentary special is airing on different parts of the country. The documentary title, which means I AM Bubble Gang, is a pun of the movie website IMDb and the cast pictorial parodies Anonymous's famous pose, standing in unison in a circle, and also the acronym for Imbestigador. (2015).
- 21 Gang Salute - 21st anniversary. The phrase is a pun on 21-gun salute, a custom of military honor by firing ammunition. The two-part special honors 21 Filipino iconic comedians who inspired Bubble Gang and the Philippine's style of comedy through the years. It featured live performances of sketches in front of an audience. (2016).
- Parokya Bente Dos - 22nd anniversary. The show aired its first-ever romance-comedy-musical theater play which is based on songs from the OPM Rock band, Parokya Ni Edgar. (2017). The musical is about a man named Buloy, portrayed by Michael V. who has a crush on actress Birdie Aguila, portrayed by Kim Domingo and how Buloy got his dream girl in the end. Birdie's abusive boyfriend, Uno Suave, portrayed by Paolo Contis and his bodyguards portrayed by Antonio Aquitania, Boy2 Quizon, and Mikael Daez stand as the antagonists in the story. The anniversary special also aired an episode which featured behind-the-scene moments and how the cast and crew prepared on the musical stage play.
- Bente Tres Oras - 23rd anniversary. The show aired an action-comedy-adventure television film which is a crossover of different characters from different sketches of the show. The cast and crew shot the film in studio and on outside locations. The title is a parody of GMA's newscast 24 Oras.
- The Scavengers (24th anniversary) – It is a parody of the Avengers film series. In this two-part special, the Scavengers fight Allan Peter Kuya Thanos (Michael V.), a parody of Thanos and politician Alan Peter Cayetano, at different plots. It also featured guests, including Manila mayor Isko Moreno and Filipino-American actor Jacob Batalon.
- Ka-BUBBLE Mula Noon, 'GANG Ngayon - 25th Anniversary (Silver Year). Due to COVID-19 restrictions, the show opted to postpone its 25th-anniversary presentation by one year and merge 2 separate anniversary specials into a simple yet rare and emotional episode. The special episode technically celebrates 26 years of Bubble Gang, but it was marketed as the 25th anniversary to give more emphasis to its silver milestone. The presentation is a first in Bubble Gang history as it involved remakes of classic sketches, performed by the new cast and special guests, which were composed of some of the former cast and long-time fans of the show. Moreover, the fans, known as mga Ka-Bubble or Ka-Babol, were interviewed by the cast themselves and they also received 25 thousand pesos each from the show as a form of gratitude and to highlight the emotional tone of the episode, which is the first anniversary special during the COVID-19 pandemic era. Health protocols were followed and some of the sketches were shot in the studio and remote locations. Michael V also wrote and performed a special song to narrate the 25-year history of the show and to give warm tribute to the loyal fans who still watch the program. The silver presentation was also dedicated to the show's director, Bert De Leon, who died just a few days before the airing date.
- Venti 7 - 27th Anniversary. - The two-part special with the viral TikTok creators and vloggers as special guests. it was taped at Aqua Planet in Clark Freeport Zone, Pampanga. The title references the words Venti (a 24-ounce coffee from Starbucks), bente (Spanish word for twenty), and twenty itself (which rhymes with both Venti and bente), and the playable character from Genshin Impact.
- Bente O-Chew - 28th Anniversary. - A two-part special with special guests Boy Abunda, Herlene Budol, Kim Atienza, Cookie and Belli, Ninong Ry and Jillian Ward. It also featured musical guests Lola Amour and Dilaw, who came to sing parody songs written and sung by Michael V. The title, "Bente O-Chew", is a pun on "Bente ocho" (Spanish word for twenty-eight) and "chew", referring to bubble gum, which the show was named after.
- BaliSong Bente Nuebe - 29th Anniversary. - A two-part special with special guests Pinky Amador, Michael Sager, Angel Guardian, Rabiya Mateo and XOXO. The title references the word "bali" which means "break" (in Filipino), which "BaliSong" means a break between songs during the gags. it also that tite is pun to "balisong" (butterfly knife) refer standard balisong measures 29 centimeters when fully opened that perfectly matching the show's 29 years on the air
- BG30 - Batang Bubble Ako - 30th Anniversary (Pearl Year). - The two-part special celebrates the show's 30th anniversary and features guest appearances from past cast members, including Ogie Alcasid and Diana Zubiri, as well as guest stars Rhian Ramos, Esnyr, Ai-Ai delas Alas, Jillian Ward, Emil Sumangil and Vice Ganda.
- Trendta'y Uno - 31st Anniversary. - The two-part special with features guest appearances from past cast members are Wendell Ramos, Assunta de Rossi, Gwen Zamora, Eric Fructuoso and Dasuri Choi, as well as guest stars Jessica Soho, Sanya Lopez, Rayver Cruz, Gladys Reyes, Mikael Daez, Yumi (Zephanie, Olive May, Gaea Mischa, Naya Ambi and Mitzi Josh) and a very special guest is apl.de.ap. The title, "Trendta'y Uno" is a pun on "Trenta'y Uno" (Thirty-one in Fillpino) and "trend" that referring to various media outlets that keep pace with current trends

== See also ==
- List of GMA Network shows
