= Pidol's Wonderland =

- Title card
- Also known as: Istorifik: Pidol's Kuwentong Fantastik
- Genre: Comedy; Fantasy
- Created by: Associated Broadcasting Company
- Written by: Elmer L. Gatchalian
- Directed by: Enrico S. Quizon
- Starring: Dolphy
- Country of origin: Philippines
- Original language: Tagalog
- No. of episodes: 128

Production
- Executive producers: Shirley J. Fabella; Jenielle Enojo-Mauricio
- Running time: 60 minutes

Original release
- Network: TV5
- Release: April 4, 2010 – September 8, 2013

Istorifik: Pidol's Kuwentong Fantastik (formerly known as Pidol's Wonderland) is a Philippine television fantasy comedy series broadcast by TV5. Directed by Enrico S. Quizon, it stars Dolphy. It aired on the network's Sunday evening line up from April 4, 2010 to September 8, 2013, replacing the Sunday slot of Everybody Hapi and was replaced by Who Wants to Be a Millionaire?. The program aired every Sunday at 6:30 PM.

Pidol's Wonderland dramatizes, adapts, and retells folk tales and legends, as well as original tall tales and fantasy stories.

Due to the hospital confinement of Dolphy In 2011, until his death In 2012, Pidol's Wonderland was reformatted as a fantasy anthology.

== Plot ==
A curio shop owner in downtown Manila, Mang Pidol brings in the comedy together with his sons Bart (Vandolph Quizon) and Panyong (Epi Quizon), his daughter-in-law Jenny, and Baby VJ, his granddaughter.

The shop is where Mang Pidol's animated storytelling sessions are usually attended by a motley group of common folks in the neighborhood — the barbers Samson (Brod Pete) and Adonis (Long Mejia), the bakery owner Brigit (Joy Viado) and her assistant, Lyla (Arianna Barouk).

== Pilot episode ==
=== Summary ===
Mang Pidol, an antique shop owner, tells his family the story of twin brothers—one extremely dark and homely named Calderon, the other fair and attractive named Iñigo—whose Caucasian father William abandoned them and their mother Blanca due to doubtful parentage, leaving the family in dire financial straits. When the ruler of their realm, King Claudio, invites the male inhabitants of the kingdom to enter into contests of skill and strength for the hand of his daughter, the Princess Vanessa, the twins resolve to join. But even though he wins the contests hands-down, Calderon is forsaken because of his less-than-desirable looks. A mysterious stranger bequeaths to Calderon a magic lantern that transforms him into the dashing contender Calano, but questions about his identity put Calderon's possible victory and the love of the beautiful princess in jeopardy.

== Casts and characters ==
=== Main cast ===
- Dolphy as Mang Pidol
- Vandolph as Bart
- Epi Quizon as Panyong Epifanio
- Jenny Quizon as Jenny
- Long Mejia as Adonis
- Brod Pete as Samson
- Joy Viado as Brigit
- Mar Lopez as Mang Mar the Minstrel
- Elijah Alejo as Baby V
- Ariana Barouk as Lyla

=== Episode/guest cast ===
- Jay Aquitania
- Ritz Azul
- Ahron Villena
- Ara Mina
- Alex Gonzaga
- Karel Marquez
- Danita Paner
- Arci Muñoz
- Morissette
- Martin Escudero
- Jasmine Curtis-Smith
- Francis Magundayao
- Julian Marcus Trono
- Valeen Montenegro
- JC de Vera
- Andrea Brillantes

== TV specials ==
Date	Title	Director	Cast and Characters	Role	Synopsis
April 1 to 22, 2012	Moomoo Mia	Eric Quizon	Lorna Tolentino; Eric Quizon; Meg Imperial; Hideaki Torio; Iwa Moto; Wendell Ramos; Ruby Rodriguez Francheska Salcedo; Long Mejia; Bekimon	Mia; Gerry; Sofia; Ken; Annette; Eugene; Madame Luring; Serena; Kamatayan; Costumer	Gerry wants to inform his family about his death by the help of Madame Luring.
July 8 to August 5, 2012	Rod Santiago's Maria Carpa	Eric Quizon	Jasmine Curtis-Smith; Alwyn Uytingco; Angelie Nicole Sanoy; Jay Aquitania; Joross Gamboa; John Regala; Cai Cortez; Tiya Pusit; Rommel Padilla; Giselle Toengi	Ninay; Manuel; Prinsesa Nerva / Maria Carpa; Tolome; Tristan; Mang Antero; Aling Lina; Lola; Haring Syokoy; Reyna Nerida	Maria Carpa is set to be the next Queen of the Ocean but is prevented by Haring Syokoy, which made her to escape to the land of the mortals. She meets Ninay and Manuel who will keep her from Haring Syokoy.

On July 15, 2012, the day of Dolphy's funeral, a TV special of Pidol's Wonderland remembering the King of Comedy was aired, hosted by Vic Sotto.

== See also ==
- Bayani
- Wansapanataym
- Your Song
- Star Magic Presents
- Daig Kayo ng Lola Ko
- Regal Studio Presents
- List of TV5 (Philippine TV network) original programming
